= Tsuyako Yamashita =

Japanese figure skater

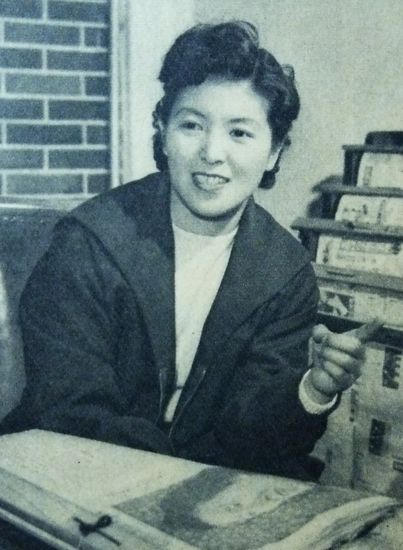
- Yamashita in 1955

Personal information
- Native name: 山下 艶子
- Full name: Tsuyako Yamashita
- Born: March 19, 1928 Osaka, Japan
- Died: February 12, 2021 (aged 92)

Figure skating career
- Country: Japan
- Discipline: Women's singles

Tsuyako Yamashita, (née Ikuta) (山下 艶子; 19 March, 1928 – 12 February, 2021) was a Japanese figure skater and coach. She was a two-time Japanese champion in 1953 and 1954.

== Early and personal life ==
Yamashita was born in Osaka. She had two elder brothers, both of whom died when she was young, as did her father. She began skating at 6 years old and was coached by Kōzō Nagai along with Etsuko Inada and Kinuko Ueno, the mother of Junko Hiramatsu.

She had two children. Her daughter, Kazumi Onishi, was also a figure skater, and she became a four-time Japanese national champion and two-time Olympian.

She died on 12 February, 2021, of heart failure.

== Career ==
Yamashita commonly practiced until 11 or 12 at night at a young age. She won the 1937 Japan Junior Figure Skating Championships and won again the next year.

She was the bronze medalist at the 1940 senior Japan Figure Skating Championships, after which the competition was halted due to World War II. She dreamed of skating in the 1940 Winter Olympics, but these were cancelled due to the war. Instead, she competed at the East Asian Games held in February 1943 in Manchuria. She recalled being scolded for mentioning the cold while waiting in her competition skirt and was told not to complain because the soldiers were cold. At the competition, she placed second behind her clubmate Yoshiko Tsukioka.

In late 1943, at age 15, she and Inada were ordered by Hideki Tojo to be sent to China and skate for injured soldiers. They spent two months there, during which they hid together from gunfire. They were treated well by the soldiers and given treats such as yōkan and zōni that were not available in Japan at the time.

After she returned, during the firebombing of Japan, she continued training after enclosing her rink in blackout curtains. Colorful costumes were also banned during the war, and she and the other skaters were only allowed to wear white dresses, with no short skirts. Her rink closed in mid-1943 due to a lack of electricity and being forced to give its freezers to the government. Yamashita did not skate for two years, and she was mobilized to a munitions factory to fill cartridges with gunpowder.

The Japanese championships resumed in 1946. Yamashita finished second that year as well as the next. After giving birth in 1948, she contemplated retiring, but she decided that she did not want to quit without winning the Japanese championships.

She won the Japanese championships in 1953 and 1954.

She finished her competitive career at the end of 1955 and became a coach. One of her students was her daughter, Kazumi Onishi. Her students also included skaters such as Nobuo Satō, Kumiko Sato, Midori Ito, Mao Asada, and Rika Kihira. She coached until her late 80s and retired in 2015 after falling on a step at the rink and breaking her neck, although she regained her ability to walk.
