= Prince Ice World =

Annual ice show

Prince Ice World プリンスアイスワールド
- Status: Ongoing
- Genre: Ice show
- Frequency: Annual
- Country: Japan
- Inaugurated: 1978
- Founder: Prince Hotels, Inc.
- Most recent: 2023
- Major events: Skating exhibitions
- Organizer: Seibu Group and Prince Hotels, Inc.
- Sponsor: Blue Muse Co., Ltd.
- Website: www.princeiceworld.com

Prince Ice World (プリンスアイスワールド) is the oldest ice show in Japan and was founded by Prince Hotels, Inc. in 1978. The show has a different theme each year and is known for its elaborately produced group numbers performed by the Prince Ice World company that consists of about thirty world-class skaters. National and international top skaters are invited as guests.

The show is produced by Seibu Group and Prince Hotels with Blue Muse Co., Ltd. as the official sponsor. Prince Hotels and Blue Muse are both subsidiaries of Seibu Group.

== History ==
Prince Ice World was the first ice show in Japan and was originally called "Viva! Ice World". It was founded by Prince Hotels, Inc. in 1978, and early performances took place at Shinagawa Skate Center. The show developed into an annual event, and the first five seasons included Japanese champions Miwa Fukuhara, Nobu Sato (father of Yuka Sato), and Minoru Sano. In 1985, "Viva! Ice World" expanded to other Japanese cities with shows in Kyoto, Fukuoka, Nagoya and Sapporo, and finally, in 1988 "Viva! Ice World" was renamed to "Prince Ice World."

In 1978 Shinobu Watanabe and Minoru Sano starred in the initial Prince Hotel Ice Shows. 1992 Olympic silver medalist Midori Ito starred in Prince Ice World in the 1990s with Yuka Sato and Junko Yaginuma. Fans bearing flowers and gifts flocked to see favorites Shizuka Awakawa, Takeshi Honda, Fumie Suguri, Miki Ando, Mao Asada, and Daisuke Takahashi. International guest stars through the years have included Ilia Kulik, Jozef Sabovcik, Elena Leanova Andrei Khvalko, Evgeni Pluschenko, and Alexei Yagudin.

== Concept ==
The shows run for about nine days each year, featuring solo performances by invited national guest stars and international stars from overseas. Each season has its own theme with specially crafted sets and the Prince Ice World company performing in intricately designed costumes. Past themes include Hello Kitty and titles such as "Let's Enjoy Skating" and "Pop Step Dance". The most recent theme in 2023 was "Broadway Classics."

== Audience and accessibility ==
The shows were televised on Fuji TV from 1993 till 2000 when Tokai Television Broadcasting purchased the media rights. In 2022, the performance in Yokohama was broadcast on TV Tokyo.

== Cast ==
National top skaters performing in Prince Ice World since the show was established include:

- (Japan) Shinobu Watanabe
- (Japan) Midori Ito
- (Japan) Yuka Sato
- (Japan) Junko Yaginuma
- (Japan) Shizuka Arakawa
- (Japan) Mao Asada
- (Japan) Yuzuru Hanyu
- (Japan) Takeshi Honda
- (Japan) Fumie Suguri
- (Japan) Miki Ando
- (Japan) Daisuke Takahashi
- (Japan) Shoma Uno
- (Japan) Miwa Fukuhara
- (Japan) Nobu Sato
- (Japan) Minoru Sano
- (Japan) Nobunari Oda
- (Japan) Keiji Tanaka
- (Japan) Kana Muramoto / Daisuke Takahashi
- (Japan) Yuma Kagiyama
- (Japan) Marin Honda
- (Japan) Wakaba Higuchi
- (Japan) Kazuki Tomono
- (Japan) Kao Miura
- (Japan) Rion Sumiyoshi
- (Japan) Ami Nakai

International guest skaters include:

- (Russia) Alexei Yagudin
- (Russia) Evgeni Plushenko
- (Czech Republic) Jozef Sabovcik
- (United States) Nathan Chen
- (Russia) Ilia Kulik
- (Russia) Elena Leanova / Andrei Khvalko

== Notes and references ==
=== External links ===
- Prince Ice World (Official Website)
- Prince Ice World on Twitter
- Prince Ice World on Instagram
