= 1936 European Figure Skating Championships =

Figure skating competition

1936 European Championships
- Type: ISU Championship
- Season: 1935–36
- Location: (Nazi Germany) Berlin, Germany

Champions
- Men's singles: (Austria) Karl Schäfer
- Ladies' singles: (Norway) Sonja Henie
- Pairs: (Nazi Germany) Maxi Herber / Ernst Baier
- Previous: 1935 European Championships
- Next: 1937 European Championships

The 1936 European Figure Skating Championships were held in Berlin, Germany. Elite senior-level figure skaters from European ISU member nations, as well as Japan, competed for the title of European Championin the disciplines of men's singles, ladies' singles, and pair skating.

== Results ==
=== Men ===
Rank	Name	Places
1	(Austria) Karl Schäfer	
2	(United Kingdom) Graham Sharp	
3	(Nazi Germany) Ernst Baier	
4	(Austria) Felix Kaspar	
5	(Kingdom of Hungary) Elemér Terták	30
6	(Finland) Marcus Nikkanen	
7	(Japan) Toshikazu Katayama	
8	(United Kingdom) Freddie Tomlins	
9	(Japan) Kazuyoshi Oimatsu	
10	(Belgium) Robert van Zeebroeck	
11	(Belgium) Freddy Mésot	
12	(France) Jean Henrion	
13	(Austria) Günther Lorenz	
14	(Nazi Germany) Herbert Haertel	
15	(Poland) Walter Grobert	
WD	(Japan) Tsugio Hasegawa	DNS

=== Ladies ===
Rank	Name	Places
1	(Norway) Sonja Henie	
2	(United Kingdom) Cecilia Colledge	
3	(United Kingdom) Megan Taylor	
4	(Austria) Liselotte Landbeck	
5	(Sweden) Vivi-Anne Hultén	
6	(Austria) Hedy Stenuf	
7	(Nazi Germany) Maxi Herber	
8	(Nazi Germany) Viktoria Lindpaitner	
9	(Japan) Etsuko Inada	
10	(United Kingdom) Gladys Jagger	
11	(United Kingdom) Mia Macklin	
12	(United Kingdom) Pamela Prior	
13	(Kingdom of Hungary) Györgyi Botond	
14	(Kingdom of Hungary) Éva Botond	
15	(Czechoslovakia) Věra Hrubá	
16	(France) Jacqueline Vaudecrane	
17	(Switzerland) Anita Wägeler	

=== Pairs ===
Rank	Name	Places
1	(Nazi Germany) Maxi Herber / Ernst Baier	
2	(United Kingdom) Violet Cliff / Leslie Cliff	
3	(Kingdom of Hungary) Piroska Szekrényessy / Attila Szekrényessy	19
4	(Nazi Germany) Eva Prawitz / Otto Weiß	
5	(Poland) Stephanie Kalusz / Erwin Kalusz	
6	(Belgium) Louise Contamine / Robert Verdun	
7	(Czechoslovakia) Věra Trejbalová / Josef Vosolsobě	
