= Japan Figure Skating Championships =

Annual national figure skating competition

- Status: Active
- Genre: National championships
- Frequency: Annual
- Country: Japan
- Inaugurated: 1930
- Previous event: 2025–26 Japan Championships
- Next event: 2026-27 Japan Championships
- Organizer: Japan Skating Federation

The Japan Figure Skating Championships (Japanese: 全日本フィギュアスケート選手権) are an annual figure skating competition organised by the Japan Skating Federation (Japanese: 日本スケート連盟) to crown the national champions of Japan. Medals are awarded in men's singles, women's singles, pair skating, and ice dance at the senior level, although not every discipline is held every year due to a lack of participants. Junior-level skaters compete at the Japan Junior Figure Skating Championships. Nobuo Satō currently holds the record for winning the most Japan Championship titles in men's singles (with ten), while Midori Ito holds the record in women's singles (with nine). Narumi Takahashi and Ryuichi Kihara are tied for winning the most championship titles in pair skating (with six each), and while two of those titles were won as partners with each other, the others were won with different partners. Chris Reed holds the record in ice dance (with ten), although those were also won with different partners.

== History ==
The Japanese Skating Association was formed by figure skating enthusiasts in the autumn of 1920. In the beginning, figure skating in Japan was dominated by men, as very few Japanese women skated. The first figure skating competition was planned to be held in February 1921 in Suwa, though because the competition rules were not yet clearly defined, only the speed skating portion of the competition was held. In February 1922, the first figure skating competition was carried out using a translation of the international rules. The winner was Masatomo Godai.

The first artificial ice rink in Japan was constructed in Osaka in 1923. Japan joined the International Skating Union (ISU) in 1926, and in 1929, the modern Japan Skating Federation was jointly formed by the Japanese Skating Association and the Japanese Collegiate Ice Sports Federation. Early the next year, the Federation began to hold combined national championships for speed skating, figure skating, and ice hockey. Five years later, in 1935, women began competing as well.

The Championships have been cancelled several times. They were not held from 1942 through 1946 due to World War II. In 1949, they were cancelled due to the weather being too warm, and in 1952, they were cancelled because only one man and no women registered. Initially held between January and March, from 1966, the championships have been held in November or December.

== Senior medalists ==
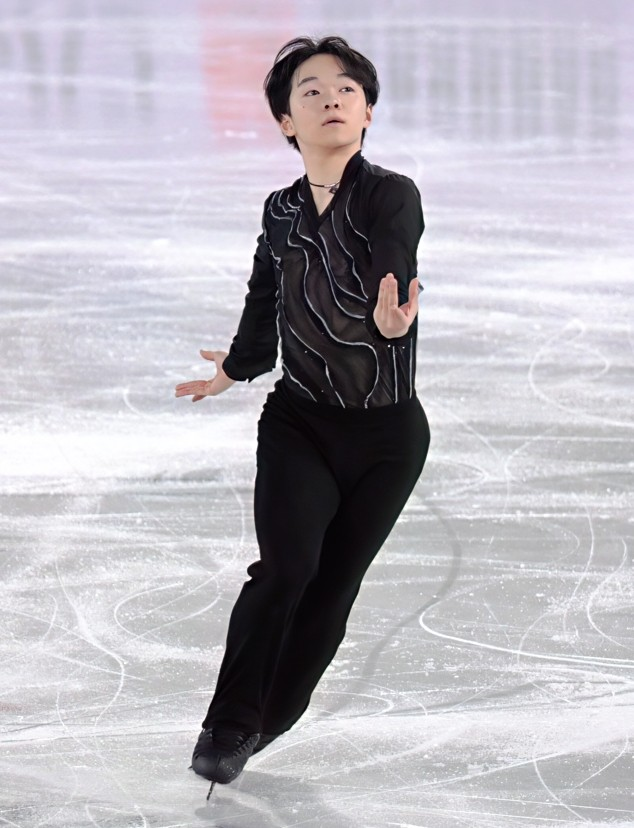
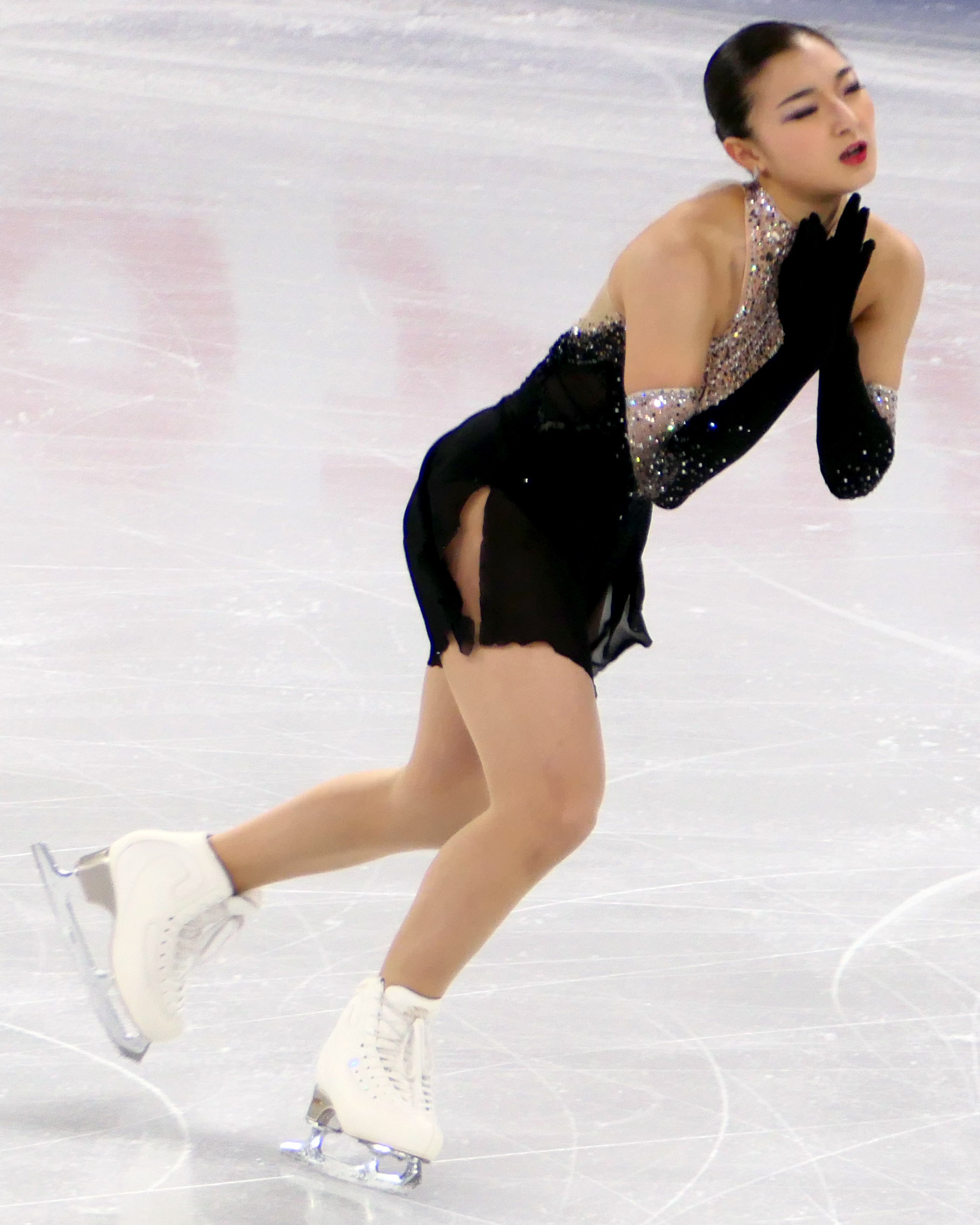
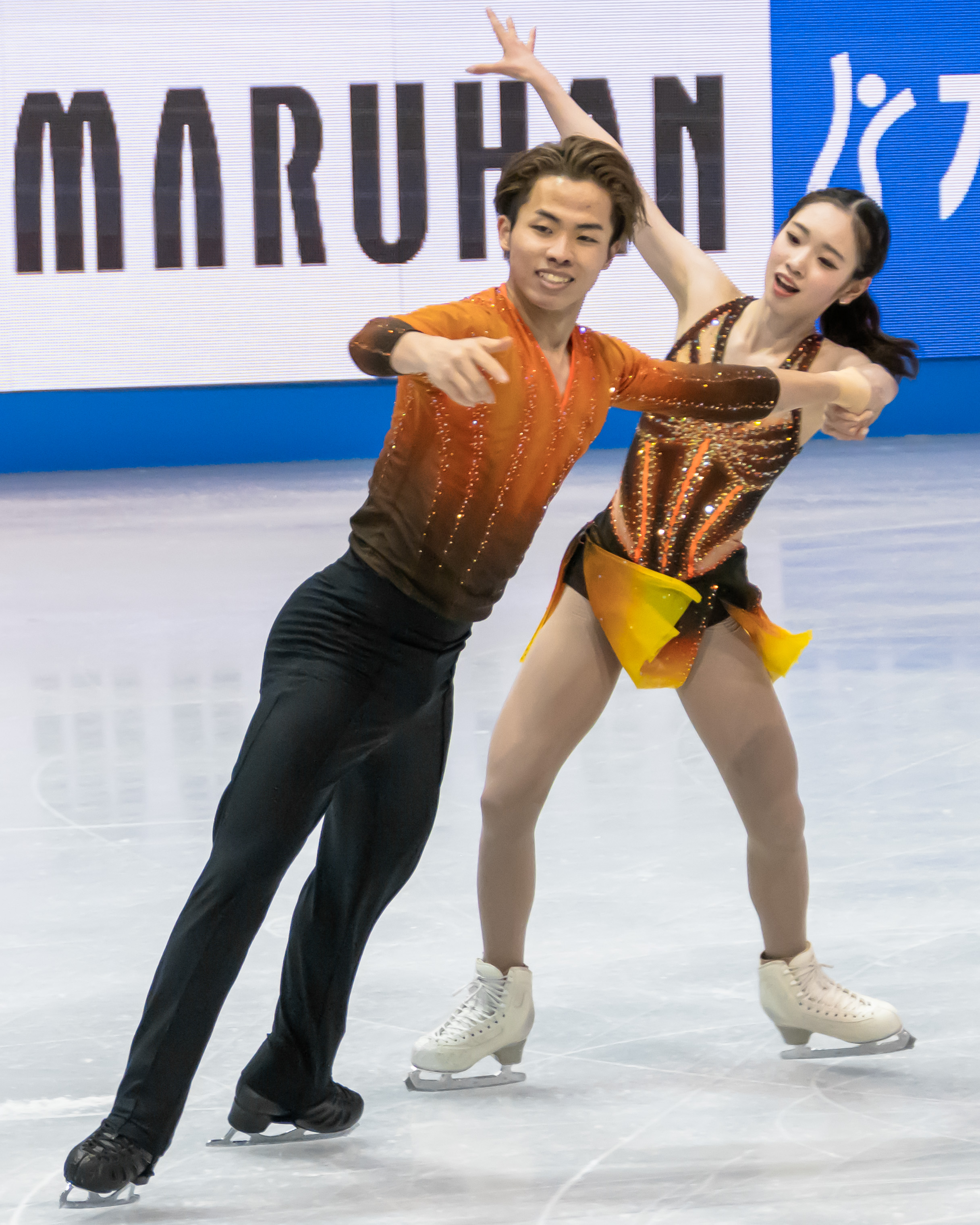
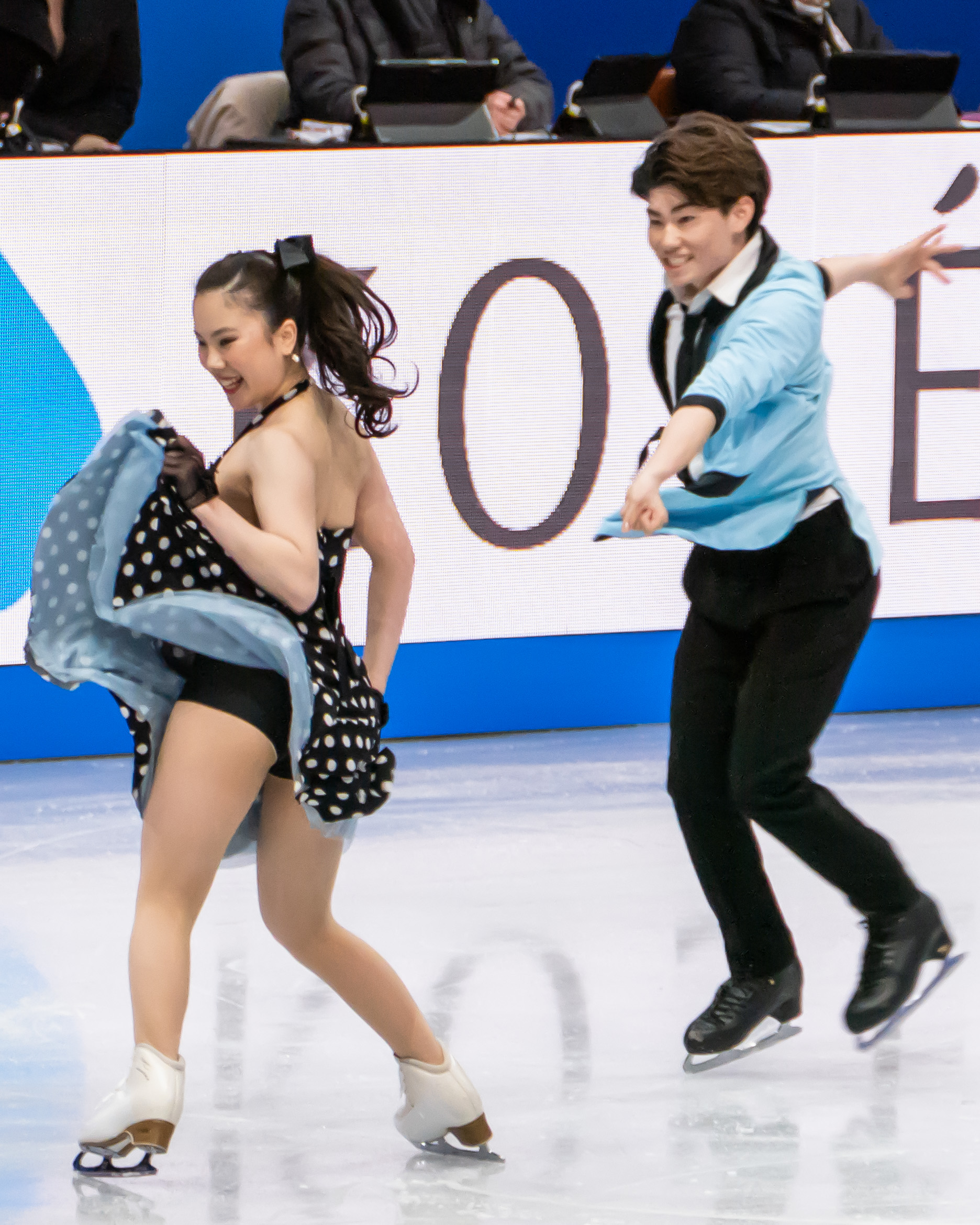
From left to right: The reigning Japanese figure skating champions: Yuma Kagiyama (men's singles); Kaori Sakamoto (women's singles); Yuna Nagaoka and Sumitada Moriguchi (pair skating); and Utana Yoshida and Masaya Morita (ice dance)

=== Men's singles ===
Men's event medalists
Season	Location	Gold	Silver	Bronze	Ref.
1929–30	Nikko	Makoto Kubo	Yukichi Kaneko	Susumu Kobayashi	
1930–31	Sendai	Kazuyoshi Oimatsu	Ryuichi Obitani	Susumu Kobayashi	
1931–32	Shimosuwa	Kingo Sato	Toshikazu Katayama	Yoshizo Wada	
1932–33	Tokyo	Toshikazu Katayama	Kazuyoshi Oimatsu	Tsugio Hasegawa	
1933–34	Osaka	Toshikazu Katayama	Zenjiro Watanabe	Tsugio Hasegawa	
1934–35	Tokyo	Toshikazu Katayama	Tsugio Hasegawa	Kazuyoshi Oimatsu	
1935–36	Tokyo	Shizuji Kitagawa	Katsutoshi Kobayashi	Shin Kurahashi	
1936–37	Tokyo	Toshikazu Katayama	Zenjiro Watanabe	Tsugio Hasegawa	
1937–38	Tokyo	Toshikazu Katayama	Hiroshi Kanda	Fujimaru Shodoshima	
1938–39	Tokyo	Hiroshi Kanda	Ryusuke Arisaka	Fujimaru Shodoshima	
1939–40	Tokyo	Ryusuke Arisaka	Hiroshi Kanda	Fujimaru Shodoshima	
1940–41	Tokyo	Ryusuke Arisaka	Katsuyuki Sakai	Fujimaru Shodoshima	
1941–46	No competitions due to World War II				
1946–47	Hachinohe	Ryusuke Arisaka	Tatsujiro Kawashima	Kiyoshi Iwasaki	
1947–48	Morioka	Ryusuke Arisaka	Naoshige Shiota	Suzuo Haraguchi	
1948–49	Suwa	Competition cancelled			
1949–50	Tomakomai	Katsuyuki Sakai	Masami Kobayashi	Suzuo Haraguchi	
1950–51	Nikko	Ryusuke Arisaka	Naoshige Shiota	Masami Kobayashi	
1951–52	Tokyo	Competition cancelled			
1952–53	Tokyo (Note: The compulsory figures were contested in Kanagawa.)	Jack B. Jost (United States) (Note: Pvt. Jack B. Jost was invited to compete in the Japanese Championships while he was stationed in Japan with the United States Army.)	Naoshige Shiota (Note: Neither Naoshige Shiota nor Masami Kobayashi achieved the minimum required score to receive a medal.)	Masami Kobayashi	
1953–54	Osaka	Masami Kobayashi (Note: None of the competitors achieved the minimum required score to be named the Japanese champion.)	Tetsutaro Tanaka	Shuichi Sugimoto	
1954–55	Tokyo	Kazuo Ohashi	Yukio Nishikura	Masami Kobayashi	
1955–56	Kyoto	Hideo Sugita	Kazuo Ohashi	Nobuo Satō	
1956–57	Tokyo	Nobuo Satō	Yukio Nishikura	Hideo Sugita	
1957–58	Tokyo	Nobuo Satō	Yukio Nishikura	Hideo Sugita	
1958–59	Osaka	Nobuo Satō	Yukio Nishikura	Hideo Sugita	
1959–60	Tokyo	Nobuo Satō	Yukio Nishikura	Hideo Sugita	
1960–61	Tokyo	Nobuo Satō	Hideo Sugita	Yutaka Doke	
1961–62	Osaka	Nobuo Satō	Hideo Sugita	Masato Tamura	
1962–63	Tokyo	Nobuo Satō	Yoshiyuki Koizumi	Yutaka Doke	
1963–64	Tokyo	Nobuo Satō	Yoshiyuki Koizumi	Masato Tamura	
1964–65	Osaka	Nobuo Satō	Tsuguhiko Kozuka	Masato Tamura	
1965–66	Tomakomai	Nobuo Satō	Tsuguhiko Kozuka	Yutaka Higuchi	
1966–67	Tokyo	Tsuguhiko Kozuka	Masato Tamura	Yutaka Higuchi	
1967–68	Tokyo	Tsuguhiko Kozuka	Yutaka Higuchi	Masato Tamura	
1968–69	Tokyo	Tsuguhiko Kozuka	Akira Yoshizawa	Tomomi Sato	
1969–70	Osaka	Yutaka Higuchi	Akira Yoshizawa	Tomomi Sato	
1970–71	Tokyo	Yutaka Higuchi	Tsuguhiko Kozuka	Minoru Sano	
1971–72	Sapporo	Yutaka Higuchi	Minoru Sano	Tsuguhiko Kozuka	
1972–73	Osaka	Minoru Sano	Tomomi Sato	Mitsuru Matsumura	
1973–74	Kyoto	Minoru Sano	Mitsuru Matsumura	Yoshinori Onishi	
1974–75	Hiroshima	Minoru Sano	Mitsuru Matsumura	Fumio Igarashi	
1975–76	Tokyo	Minoru Sano	Mitsuru Matsumura	Fumio Igarashi	
1976–77	Tokyo	Minoru Sano	Mitsuru Matsumura	Fumio Igarashi	
1977–78	Kyoto	Fumio Igarashi	Mitsuru Matsumura	Takashi Mura	
1978–79	Tokyo	Mitsuru Matsumura	Fumio Igarashi	Shinji Someya	
1979–80	Tokyo	Fumio Igarashi	Mitsuru Matsumura	Takashi Mura	
1980–81	Tokyo	Fumio Igarashi	Takashi Mura	Masaru Ogawa	
1981–82	Tokyo	Fumio Igarashi	Mitsuru Matsumura	Takashi Mura	
1982–83	Tokyo	Shinji Someya	Takashi Mura	Masaru Ogawa	
1983–84	Tokyo	Masaru Ogawa	Takashi Mura	Makoto Kano	
1984–85	Tokyo	Masaru Ogawa	Makoto Kano	Tatsuya Fujii	
1985–86	Tokyo	Masaru Ogawa	Makoto Kano	Tatsuya Fujii	
1986–87	Tokyo	Masaru Ogawa	Makoto Kano	Tatsuya Fujii	
1987–88	Tokyo	Makoto Kano	Tatsuya Fujii	Komyo Takeuchi	
1988–89	Tokyo	Makoto Kano	Mitsuhiro Murata	Tatsuya Fujii	
1989–90	Kitakyushu	Tatsuya Fujii	Masakazu Kagiyama	Mitsuhiro Murata	
1990–91	Yokohama	Masakazu Kagiyama	Mitsuhiro Murata	Daisuke Nishikawa	
1991–92	Kobe	Masakazu Kagiyama	Mitsuhiro Murata	Noyu Yariuchi	
1992–93	Nagoya	Masakazu Kagiyama	Tomoaki Koyama	Fumihiro Oikawa	
1993–94	Yokohama	Fumihiro Oikawa	Masakazu Kagiyama	Yoshiaki Takeuchi	
1994–95	Kobe	Shin Amano	Naoki Shigematsu	Seiichi Suzuki	
1995–96	Yokohama	Takeshi Honda	Naoki Shigematsu	Makoto Okazaki	
1996–97	Nagano	Takeshi Honda	Yamato Tamura	Makoto Okazaki	
1997–98	Kobe	Yamato Tamura	Naoki Shigematsu	Yosuke Takeuchi	
1998–99	Yokohama	Yosuke Takeuchi	Naoki Shigematsu	Yamato Tamura	
1999–2000	Fukuoka	Takeshi Honda	Yamato Tamura	Naoki Shigematsu	
2000–01	Nagano	Takeshi Honda	Yamato Tamura	Yosuke Takeuchi	
2001–02	Osaka	Yosuke Takeuchi	Yamato Tamura	Makoto Okazaki	
2002–03	Kyoto	Takeshi Honda	Yamato Tamura	Kensuke Nakaniwa	
2003–04	Nagano	Yamato Tamura	Kazumi Kishimoto	Daisuke Takahashi	
2004–05	Yokohama	Takeshi Honda	Kensuke Nakaniwa	Nobunari Oda	
2005–06	Tokyo	Daisuke Takahashi	Nobunari Oda	Kensuke Nakaniwa	
2006–07	Nagoya	Daisuke Takahashi	Nobunari Oda	Yasuharu Nanri	
2007–08	Osaka	Daisuke Takahashi	Takahiko Kozuka	Yasuharu Nanri	
2008–09	Nagano	Nobunari Oda	Takahiko Kozuka	Takahito Mura	
2009–10	Osaka	Daisuke Takahashi	Nobunari Oda	Takahiko Kozuka	
2010–11	Nagano	Takahiko Kozuka	Nobunari Oda	Daisuke Takahashi	
2011–12	Osaka	Daisuke Takahashi	Takahiko Kozuka	Yuzuru Hanyu	
2012–13	Sapporo	Yuzuru Hanyu	Daisuke Takahashi	Takahito Mura	
2013–14	Saitama	Yuzuru Hanyu	Tatsuki Machida	Takahiko Kozuka	
2014–15	Nagano	Yuzuru Hanyu	Shoma Uno	Takahiko Kozuka	
2015–16	Sapporo	Yuzuru Hanyu	Shoma Uno	Takahito Mura	
2016–17	Osaka	Shoma Uno	Keiji Tanaka	Takahito Mura	
2017–18	Tokyo	Shoma Uno	Keiji Tanaka	Takahito Mura	
2018–19	Osaka	Shoma Uno	Daisuke Takahashi	Keiji Tanaka	
2019–20	Tokyo	Shoma Uno	Yuzuru Hanyu	Yuma Kagiyama	
2020–21	Nagano	Yuzuru Hanyu	Shoma Uno	Yuma Kagiyama	
2021–22	Saitama	Yuzuru Hanyu	Shoma Uno	Yuma Kagiyama	
2022–23	Osaka	Shoma Uno	Koshiro Shimada	Kazuki Tomono	
2023–24	Nagano	Shoma Uno	Yuma Kagiyama	Sōta Yamamoto	
2024–25	Osaka	Yuma Kagiyama	Rio Nakata	Tatsuya Tsuboi	
2025–26	Tokyo	Yuma Kagiyama	Shun Sato	Kao Miura	

=== Women's singles ===
Women's event medalists
Season	Location	Gold	Silver	Bronze	Ref.
1934–35	Tokyo	Etsuko Inada	Tamako Togo	Mitsuko Tezuka	
1935–36	Tokyo	Tamako Togo	Yoshiko Tsukioka	Mitsuko Tezuka	
1936–37	Tokyo	Etsuko Inada	Yoshiko Tsukioka	Kinuko Nakamura	
1937–38	Tokyo	Etsuko Inada	Yoshiko Tsukioka	Kinuko Nakamura	
1938–39	Tokyo	Etsuko Inada	Kinuko Nakamura	Michiko Yano	
1939–40	Tokyo	Etsuko Inada	Yoshiko Tsukioka	Michiko Yano	
1940–41	Tokyo	Etsuko Inada	Yoshiko Tsukioka	Tsuyako Ikuta	
1941–46	No competitions due to World War II				
1946–47	Hachinohe	Yoshiko Tsukioka	Tsuyako Ikuta	Kyoko Tokue	
1947–48	Morioka	Yoshiko Niwa	Tsuyako Ikuta	Reiko Kato	
1948–49	Suwa	Competition cancelled			
1949–50	Tomakomai	No competitors			
1950–51	Nikko	Etsuko Inada	Yoshiko Niwa	Tsuyako Yamashita	
1951–52	Tokyo	Competition cancelled			
1952–53	Tokyo	Yoshiko Tsukioka	Reiko Kobayashi	Nana Aeba (Note: Nana Aeba did not achieve the minimum required score to receive a medal.)	
1953–54	Osaka	Tsuyako Yamashita	Reiko Kobayashi	No other competitors	
1954–55	Tokyo	Tsuyako Yamashita	Yoko Midoro	Hisako Honda	
1955–56	Kyoto	Junko Ueno	Yoko Midoro	Yuko Araki	
1956–57	Tokyo	Junko Ueno	Yuko Araki	Miwa Fukuhara	
1957–58	Tokyo	Junko Ueno	Miwa Fukuhara	Hitomi Kurahashi	
1958–59	Osaka	Junko Ueno	Miwa Fukuhara	Kumiko Okawa	
1959–60	Tokyo	Miwa Fukuhara	Junko Ueno	Kumiko Okawa	
1960–61	Tokyo	Junko Ueno	Miwa Fukuhara	Kumiko Okawa	
1961–62	Osaka	Miwa Fukuhara	Junko Ueno	Kumiko Okawa	
1962–63	Tokyo	Miwa Fukuhara	Kumiko Okawa	Junko Ueno	
1963–64	Tokyo	Miwa Fukuhara	Kumiko Okawa	Junko Ueno	
1964–65	Osaka	Miwa Fukuhara	Kumiko Okawa	Kazumi Yamashita	
1965–66	Tomakomai	Miwa Fukuhara	Kumiko Okawa	Haruko Ishida	
1966–67	Tokyo	Kumiko Okawa	Miwa Fukuhara	Kazumi Yamashita	
1967–68	Tokyo	Kumiko Okawa	Kazumi Yamashita	Haruko Ishida	
1968–69	Tokyo	Kazumi Yamashita	Keiko Miyagawa	Keiko Yuzawa	
1969–70	Osaka	Kazumi Yamashita	Keiko Miyagawa	Harumi Yoshizawa	
1970–71	Tokyo	Kazumi Yamashita	Shuko Takeyama	Harumi Yoshizawa	
1971–72	Sapporo	Kazumi Yamashita	Shuko Takeyama	Keiko Yuzawa	
1972–73	Osaka	Emi Watanabe	Miwako Ohashi	Keiko Yuzawa	
1973–74	Kyoto	Emi Watanabe	Miwako Ohashi	Shinobu Watanabe	
1974–75	Hiroshima	Emi Watanabe	Miwako Ohashi	Shinobu Watanabe	
1975–76	Tokyo	Emi Watanabe	Shinobu Watanabe	Reiko Kobayashi	
1976–77	Tokyo	Emi Watanabe	Reiko Kobayashi	Shinobu Watanabe	
1977–78	Kyoto	Emi Watanabe	Reiko Kobayashi	Mariko Yoshida	
1978–79	Tokyo	Emi Watanabe	Reiko Kobayashi	Mariko Yoshida	
1979–80	Tokyo	Emi Watanabe	Reiko Kobayashi	Yoko Yakushi	
1980–81	Tokyo	Reiko Kobayashi	Mariko Yoshida	Midori Ito	
1981–82	Tokyo	Mariko Yoshida	Masako Kato	Yukiko Okabe	
1982–83	Tokyo	Juri Ozawa	Megumi Aotani	Sachie Yuki	
1983–84	Tokyo	Masako Kato	Midori Ito	Yukari Yoshimori	
1984–85	Tokyo	Midori Ito	Masako Kato	Sachie Yuki	
1985–86	Tokyo	Midori Ito	Sachie Yuki	Juri Ozawa	
1986–87	Tokyo	Midori Ito	Masako Kato	Yukiko Kashihara	
1987–88	Tokyo	Midori Ito	Junko Yaginuma	Yuka Sato	
1988–89	Tokyo	Midori Ito	Junko Yaginuma	Yuka Sato	
1989–90	Kitakyushu	Midori Ito	Yuka Sato	Junko Yaginuma	
1990–91	Yokohama	Midori Ito	Mari Asanuma	Junko Yaginuma	
1991–92	Kobe	Midori Ito	Yuka Sato	Junko Yaginuma	
1992–93	Nagoya	Yuka Sato	Junko Yaginuma	Kumiko Koiwai	
1993–94	Yokohama	Yuka Sato	Rena Inoue	Kumiko Koiwai	
1994–95	Kobe	Hanae Yokoya	Junko Yaginuma	Kumiko Koiwai	
1995–96	Yokohama	Midori Ito	Hanae Yokoya	Yumi Sano	
1996–97	Nagano	Fumie Suguri	Shizuka Arakawa	Yuka Kanazawa	
1997–98	Kobe	Shizuka Arakawa	Fumie Suguri	Rena Inoue	
1998–99	Yokohama	Shizuka Arakawa	Fumie Suguri	Yuka Kanazawa	
1999–2000	Fukuoka	Chisato Shiina	Arisa Yamazaki	Fumie Suguri	
2000–01	Nagano	Fumie Suguri	Shizuka Arakawa	Yoshie Onda	
2001–02	Osaka	Fumie Suguri	Shizuka Arakawa	Miki Ando	
2002–03	Kyoto	Fumie Suguri	Yoshie Onda	Shizuka Arakawa	
2003–04	Nagano	Miki Ando	Fumie Suguri	Shizuka Arakawa	
2004–05	Yokohama	Miki Ando	Mao Asada	Fumie Suguri	
2005–06	Tokyo	Fumie Suguri	Mao Asada	Shizuka Arakawa	
2006–07	Nagoya	Mao Asada	Miki Ando	Yukari Nakano	
2007–08	Osaka	Mao Asada	Miki Ando	Yukari Nakano	
2008–09	Nagano	Mao Asada	Fumie Suguri	Miki Ando	
2009–10	Osaka	Mao Asada	Akiko Suzuki	Yukari Nakano	
2010–11	Nagano	Miki Ando	Mao Asada	Kanako Murakami	
2011–12	Osaka	Mao Asada	Akiko Suzuki	Kanako Murakami	
2012–13	Sapporo	Mao Asada	Kanako Murakami	Satoko Miyahara	
2013–14	Saitama	Akiko Suzuki	Kanako Murakami	Mao Asada	
2014–15	Nagano	Satoko Miyahara	Rika Hongo	Wakaba Higuchi	
2015–16	Sapporo	Satoko Miyahara	Wakaba Higuchi	Mao Asada	
2016–17	Osaka	Satoko Miyahara	Wakaba Higuchi	Mai Mihara	
2017–18	Tokyo	Satoko Miyahara	Kaori Sakamoto	Rika Kihira	
2018–19	Osaka	Kaori Sakamoto	Rika Kihira	Satoko Miyahara	
2019–20	Tokyo	Rika Kihira	Wakaba Higuchi	Tomoe Kawabata	
2020–21	Nagano	Rika Kihira	Kaori Sakamoto	Satoko Miyahara	
2021–22	Saitama	Kaori Sakamoto	Wakaba Higuchi	Mana Kawabe	
2022–23	Osaka	Kaori Sakamoto	Mai Mihara	Mao Shimada	
2023–24	Nagano	Kaori Sakamoto	Mone Chiba	Mao Shimada	
2024–25	Osaka	Kaori Sakamoto	Mao Shimada	Wakaba Higuchi	
2025–26	Tokyo	Kaori Sakamoto	Mao Shimada	Mone Chiba	

=== Pairs ===
Pairs event medalists
Season	Location	Gold	Silver	Bronze	Ref.
1955–56	Kyoto	Fumiko Nishimura; Kashio Takizawa	No other competitors		
1956–57	Tokyo	Sumiko Shimodaira; Masami Kobayashi	Tsuyako Takada; Kenzou Nishida	No other competitors	
1957–58	Tokyo	Sumiko Shimodaira; Masami Kobayashi	Tsuyako Takada; Kenzou Nishida	No other competitors	
1958–59	Osaka	Junko Kuwana; Takatsugu Hashiguchi	Sumiko Shimodaira; Masami Kobayashi	Junko Takada; Kenzo Nishida	
1959–60	Tokyo	Junko Onoda; Takatsugu Hashiguchi	No other competitors		
1960–61	Tokyo	Yoko Oiwa; Kazuhiko Kakita	Machiko Kinoshita; Takatsugu Hashiguchi	Mihoko Ogita; Koichi Kawamura	
1961–62	Osaka	Mieko Oiwa; Yutaka Doke	No other competitors		
1962–63	Tokyo	Mieko Oiwa; Yutaka Doke	No other competitors		
1963–64	Tokyo	Noriko Harada; Takatsugu Hashiguchi	No other competitors		
1964–66	No pairs competitors				
1966–67	Tokyo	Komako Iwadate; Masayasu Iguchi	No other competitors		
1967–68	Tokyo	Kotoe Nagasawa; Hiroshi Nagakubo	Sachiko Kobayashi; Koji Tanaka	No other competitors	
1968–69	Tokyo	Kotoe Nagasawa; Hiroshi Nagakubo	No other competitors		
1969–70	Osaka	Kotoe Nagasawa; Hiroshi Nagakubo	No other competitors		
1970–71	Tokyo	Kotoe Nagasawa; Hiroshi Nagakubo	No other competitors		
1971–72	Sapporo	Kotoe Nagasawa; Hiroshi Nagakubo	No other competitors		
1972–73	Osaka	Fujiko Seki; Toshimitsu Doke	No other competitors		
1973–75	No pairs competitors				
1975–76	Tokyo	Kyoko Hagiwara; Sumio Murata	Hamae Kato; Hiromichi Ogihara	Miko Maruyama; Shoki Shodoshima	
1976–77	Tokyo	Kyoko Hagiwara; Sumio Murata	Hamae Kato; Hiromichi Ogihara	Naoko Asano; Koji Okajima	
1977–78	Kyoto	Kyoko Hagiwara; Sumio Murata	Tomoko Tanaka; Hisao Ozaki	Hamae Kato; Hiromichi Ogihara	
1978–79	Tokyo	Kyoko Hagiwara; Hisao Ozaki	Kiyoko Matsumoto; Makoto Shiotani	Hamae Kato; Koji Okajima	
1979–80	Tokyo	Yukiko Okabe; Takashi Mura	Mutsumi Takezaki; Koji Okajima	Kiyoko Matsumoto; Makoto Shiotani	
1980–81	Tokyo	Toshimi Ito; Takashi Mura	No other competitors		
1981–86	Tokyo	No pairs competitors			
1986–87	Tokyo	Akiko Nogami; Youichi Yamasaki	Hikaru Dono; Takaya Utada	No other competitors	
1987–88	Tokyo	Akiko Nogami; Youichi Yamasaki	Hikaru Dono; Takaya Utada	No other competitors	
1988–89	Tokyo	Yuki Shoji; Takaya Usuda	No other competitors		
1989–90	Kitakyushu	No pairs competitors			
1990–91	Yokohama	Rena Inoue; Tomoaki Koyama	No other competitors		
1991–92	Kobe	Rena Inoue; Tomoaki Koyama	No other competitors		
1992–93	Nagoya	Yukiko Kawasaki; Alexei Tikhonov	No other competitors		
1993–94	Yokohama	Yukiko Kawasaki; Alexei Tikhonov	No other competitors		
1994–96	No pairs competitors				
1996–97	Nagano	Marie Arai; Taketo Tamura	Makiko Ogasawara; Takeo Ogasawara	Takako Kimura; Kenichi Miyo	
1997–98	Kobe	Marie Arai; Shin Amano	No other competitors		
1998–99	Yokohama	No pairs competitors			
1999–2000	Fukuoka	Makiko Ogasawara; Takeo Ogasawara	No other competitors		
2000–01	Nagano	Makiko Ogasawara; Takeo Ogasawara	No other competitors		
2001–02	Osaka	Yuko Kavaguti; Alexander Markuntsov	Makiko Ogasawara; Takeo Ogasawara	No other competitors	
2002–03	Kyoto	Yuko Kavaguti; Alexander Markuntsov	Makiko Ogasawara; Takeo Ogasawara	No other competitors	
2003–04	Nagano	No pairs competitors			
2004–05	Yokohama	Yuko Kavaguti; Devin Patrick	No other competitors		
2005–08	No pairs competitors				
2008–09	Nagano	Narumi Takahashi; Mervin Tran	No other competitors		
2009–10	Osaka	Narumi Takahashi; Mervin Tran	No other competitors		
2010–11	Nagano	Narumi Takahashi; Mervin Tran	No other competitors		
2011–12	Osaka	Narumi Takahashi; Mervin Tran	No other competitors		
2012–13	Sapporo	No pairs competitors			
2013–14	Saitama	Narumi Takahashi; Ryuichi Kihara	No other competitors		
2014–15	Nagano	Narumi Takahashi; Ryuichi Kihara	No other competitors		
2015–16	Sapporo	Sumire Suto; Francis Boudreau-Audet	Marin Ono; Wesley Killing	Miu Suzaki; Ryuichi Kihara	
2016–17	Osaka	Sumire Suto; Francis Boudreau-Audet	Miu Suzaki; Ryuichi Kihara	Marin Ono; Wesley Killing	
2017–18	Tokyo	Miu Suzaki; Ryuichi Kihara	Narumi Takahashi; Ryo Shibata	Riku Miura; Shoya Ichihashi	
2018–19	Osaka	Miu Suzaki; Ryuichi Kihara	No other competitors		
2019–20	Tokyo	Riku Miura; Ryuichi Kihara	No other competitors		
2020–21	Nagano	No pairs competitors			
2021–22	Saitama	Miyu Yunoki; Shoya Ichihashi	No other competitors		
2022–23	Osaka	Haruna Murakami; Sumitada Moriguchi	No other competitors		
2023–24	Nagano	Yuna Nagaoka; Sumitada Moriguchi	No other competitors		
2024–25	Osaka	Riku Miura; Ryuichi Kihara	Yuna Nagaoka; Sumitada Moriguchi	Sae Shimizu; Lucas Tsuyoshi Honda	
2025–26	Tokyo	Yuna Nagaoka; Sumitada Moriguchi	Ayumi Kagotani; Lucas Tsuyoshi Honda	No other competitors	

=== Ice dance ===
Ice dance event medalists
Season	Location	Gold	Silver	Bronze	Ref.
1956–57	Tokyo	Eiko Kaneko; Mikio Takeuchi	Toshiko Fuchioka; Masaharu Katayama	Yoshie Arai; Hisashi Yoshikawa	
1957–58	Tokyo	Eiko Kaneko; Mikio Takeuchi	Toshiko Fuchioka; Masaharu Katayama	Yoshie Arai; Hisashi Yoshikawa	
1958–59	Osaka	Eiko Kaneko; Mikio Takeuchi	Toshiko Fuchioka; Masaharu Katayama	Setsuko Yamauchi; Kenji Takeda	
1959–60	Tokyo	Eiko Kaneko; Mikio Takeuchi	Junko Idemitsu; Hiroshi Bessho	Mieko Oiwa; Nagahisa Ono	
1960–61	Tokyo	Eiko Kaneko; Mikio Takeuchi	Junko Idemitsu; Hiroshi Bessho	Mieko Oiwa; Yutaka Doke	
1961–62	Osaka	Eiko Kaneko; Mikio Takeuchi	No other competitors		
1962–63	Tokyo	Eiko Kaneko; Mikio Takeuchi	No other competitors		
1963–64	Tokyo	Eiko Kaneko; Mikio Takeuchi	Junko Bessho; Hiroshi Bessho	Noriko Yuzawa; Nobuhisa Matsumoto	
1964–65	Osaka	Junko Bessho; Hiroshi Bessho	Kiyoko Fujise; Katsutoshi Morinaga	No other competitors	
1965–66	Tomakomai	Noriko Yuzawa; Nobuhisa Matsumoto	Reiko Inoue; Akimitsu Hirose	No other competitors	
1966–67	Tokyo	Noriko Yuzawa; Nobuhisa Matsumoto	Reiko Inoue; Akimitsu Hirose	No other competitors	
1967–68	Tokyo	Mayumi Akahiro; Masato Tamura	No other competitors		
1968–69	Tokyo	Yoko Ishikawa; Naotoshi Nishihama	Noriko Harada; Joji Ohamazaki	Fumi Tsuyama; Hiroshi Kobayashi	
1969–70	Osaka	Toshie Sakurai; Motoyoshi Sakurai	Fumi Tsuyama; Hiroshi Kobayashi	No other competitors	
1970–71	Tokyo	Keiko Achiwa; Yasuhiro Noto	Toshie Sakurai; Motoyoshi Sakurai	No other competitors	
1971–72	Sapporo	Keiko Achiwa; Yasuhiro Noto	No other competitors		
1972–73	Osaka	Toshie Sakurai; Motoyoshi Sakurai	No other competitors		
1973–74	Kyoto	Yoshiko Nakata; Toshimitsu Doke	Tamami Abe; Hirohiko Komata	No other competitors	
1974–75	Hiroshima	Misa Kage; Masanori Takeda	Yasuko Ikejiri; Toshimitsu Doke	Naoko Kato; Akira Naito	
1975–76	Tokyo	Misa Kage; Masanori Takeda	Tamami Abe; Toshimitsu Doke	Tomoko Koide; Ryoichi Kobayashi	
1976–77	Tokyo	Misa Kage; Masanori Takeda	Sachiko Sakano; Tadayuki Takahashi	Yumiko Kage; Toshinori Fujizawa	
1977–78	Kyoto	Michiko Abe; Nozomi Sakai	Yumiko Kage; Tadayuki Takahashi	Sachiko Sakano; Sho Sekine	
1978–79	Tokyo	Yumiko Kage; Tadayuki Takahashi	Michiko Abe; Nozomi Sakai	Noriko Sato; Sho Sekine	
1979–80	Tokyo	Noriko Sato; Tadayuki Takahashi	Michiko Abe; Nozomi Sakai	Rumiko Michigami; Toshiyuki Tanaka	
1980–81	Tokyo	Noriko Sato; Tadayuki Takahashi	Yumiko Kakege; Yoshiki Nakajima	Akiko Okabe; Tamao Arai	
1981–82	Tokyo	Noriko Sato; Tadayuki Takahashi	Akiko Okabe; Tamao Arai	Tomoko Tanaka; Hiroyuki Suzuki	
1982–83	Tokyo	Noriko Sato; Tadayuki Takahashi	Yumiko Kakege; Yuki Nakajima	Tomoko Tanaka; Hiroyuki Suzuki	
1983–84	Tokyo	Noriko Sato; Tadayuki Takahashi	Tomoko Tanaka; Hiroyuki Suzuki	Yumiko Kakege; Yuki Nakajima	
1984–85	Tokyo	Noriko Sato; Tadayuki Takahashi	Tomoko Tanaka; Hiroyuki Suzuki	Junko Ito; Kinaki Tokita	
1985–86	Tokyo	Tomoko Tanaka; Hiroyuki Suzuki	Junko Ito; Kinaki Tokita	Kaoru Takino; Kenji Takino	
1986–87	Tokyo	Tomoko Tanaka; Hiroyuki Suzuki	Junko Ito; Kinaki Tokita	Kaoru Takino; Kenji Takino	
1987–88	Tokyo	Tomoko Tanaka; Hiroyuki Suzuki	Kaoru Takino; Kenji Takino	Junko Ito; Kinaki Tokita	
1988–89	Tokyo	Kaoru Takino; Kenji Takino	Akiko Higashino; Tatsuro Matsumura	Kayo Shirahata; Hiroshi Tanaka	
1989–90	Kitakyushu	Kaoru Takino; Kenji Takino	Akiko Higashino; Tatsuro Matsumura	Kayo Shirahata; Hiroshi Tanaka	
1990–91	Yokohama	Kaoru Takino; Kenji Takino	Akiko Higashino; Tatsuro Matsumura	Kayo Shirahata; Hiroshi Tanaka	
1991–92	Kobe	Kaoru Takino; Kenji Takino	Akiko Higashino; Tatsuro Matsumura	Nakako Tsuzuki; Kato Nakamura	
1992–93	Nagoya	Kayo Shirahata; Hiroshi Tanaka	Nakako Tsuzuki; Kato Nakamura	Manabu Sato; Tsuyoshi Sakai	
1993–94	Yokohama	Nakako Tsuzuki; Kato Nakamura	Yuki Habuki; Hitoshi Koizumi	Manabu Sato; Tsuyoshi Sakai	
1994–95	Kobe	Nakako Tsuzuki; Juris Razgulajevs	Aya Kawai; Hiroshi Tanaka	Yuki Habuki; Hitoshi Koizumi	
1995–96	Yokohama	Nakako Tsuzuki; Juris Razgulajevs	Aya Kawai; Hiroshi Tanaka	Akiko Kinoshita; Yosuke Moriwaki	
1996–97	Nagano	Aya Kawai; Hiroshi Tanaka	Akiko Kinoshita; Yosuke Moriwaki	Nozomi Watanabe; Akiyuki Kido	
1997–98	Kobe	Aya Kawai; Hiroshi Tanaka	Nozomi Watanabe; Akiyuki Kido	Aya Hatsuda; Koichi Suyama	
1998–99	Yokohama	Nakako Tsuzuki; Rinat Farkhoutdinov	Rie Arikawa; Kenji Miyamoto	Nozomi Watanabe; Akiyuki Kido	
1999–2000	Fukuoka	Nakako Tsuzuki; Rinat Farkhoutdinov	Nozomi Watanabe; Akiyuki Kido	Rie Arikawa; Kenji Miyamoto	
2000–01	Nagano	Nakako Tsuzuki; Rinat Farkhoutdinov	Nozomi Watanabe; Akiyuki Kido	Rie Arikawa; Kenji Miyamoto	
2001–02	Osaka	Rie Arikawa; Kenji Miyamoto	Nozomi Watanabe; Akiyuki Kido	Masumi Haruki; Hiroaki Tokita	
2002–03	Kyoto	Rie Arikawa; Kenji Miyamoto	Nozomi Watanabe; Akiyuki Kido	Masumi Haruki; Hiroaki Tokita	
2003–04	Nagano	Nozomi Watanabe; Akiyuki Kido	Nakako Tsuzuki; Kenji Miyamoto	Yurie Oda; Sho Kagayama	
2004–05	Yokohama	Nozomi Watanabe; Akiyuki Kido	Nakako Tsuzuki; Kenji Miyamoto	Minami Sakacho; Tatsuya Sakacho	
2005–06	Tokyo	Nozomi Watanabe; Akiyuki Kido	Nakako Tsuzuki; Kenji Miyamoto	Minami Sakacho; Tatsuya Sakacho	
2006–07	Nagoya	Nozomi Watanabe; Akiyuki Kido	Cathy Reed; Chris Reed	Minami Sakacho; Tatsuya Sakacho	
2007–08	Osaka	Cathy Reed; Chris Reed	No other competitors		
2008–09	Nagano	Cathy Reed; Chris Reed	Nana Sugiki; Taiyo Mizutani	Emi Hirai; Ayato Yuzawa	
2009–10	Osaka	Cathy Reed; Chris Reed	Emi Hirai; Taiyo Mizutani	No other competitors	
2010–11	Nagano	Cathy Reed; Chris Reed	Emi Hirai; Taiyo Mizutani	No other competitors	
2011–12	Osaka	Bryna Oi; Taiyo Mizutani	Emi Hirai; Marien de la Asuncion	Anna Takei; Yuya Tamada	
2012–13	Sapporo	Cathy Reed; Chris Reed	Emi Hirai; Marien de la Asuncion	Bryna Oi; Taiyo Mizutani	
2013–14	Saitama	Cathy Reed; Chris Reed	Emi Hirai; Marien de la Asuncion	Shizuru Agata; Kentaro Suzuki	
2014–15	Nagano	Cathy Reed; Chris Reed	Emi Hirai; Marien de la Asuncion	Kana Muramoto; Hiroichi Noguchi	
2015–16	Sapporo	Kana Muramoto; Chris Reed	Emi Hirai; Marien de la Asuncion	Ibuki Mori; Kentaro Suzuki	
2016–17	Osaka	Kana Muramoto; Chris Reed	Emi Hirai; Marien de la Asuncion	Misato Komatsubara; Tim Koleto	
2017–18	Tokyo	Kana Muramoto; Chris Reed	Misato Komatsubara; Tim Koleto	Rikako Fukase; Aru Tateno	
2018–19	Osaka	Misato Komatsubara; Tim Koleto	Kiria Hirayama; Axel Lamasse	Mio Iida; Kenta Ishibashi	
2019–20	Tokyo	Misato Komatsubara; Tim Koleto	Rikako Fukase; Eichu Cho	Kiria Hirayama; Kenta Ishibashi	
2020–21	Nagano	Misato Komatsubara; Tim Koleto	Kana Muramoto; Daisuke Takahashi	Rikako Fukase; Eichu Cho	
2021–22	Saitama	Misato Komatsubara; Tim Koleto	Kana Muramoto; Daisuke Takahashi	Ayumi Takanami; Shingo Nishiyama	
2022–23	Osaka	Kana Muramoto; Daisuke Takahashi	Misato Komatsubara; Tim Koleto	Nicole Takahashi; Shiloh Judd	
2023–24	Nagano	Misato Komatsubara; Tim Koleto	Azusa Tanaka; Shingo Nishiyama	Utana Yoshida; Masaya Morita	
2024–25	Osaka	Utana Yoshida; Masaya Morita	Azusa Tanaka; Shingo Nishiyama	Ayano Sasaki; Yoshimitsu Ikeda	
2025–26	Tokyo	Utana Yoshida; Masaya Morita	Ikura Kushida; Koshiro Shimada	Ayano Sasaki; Yoshimitsu Ikeda	

== Records ==
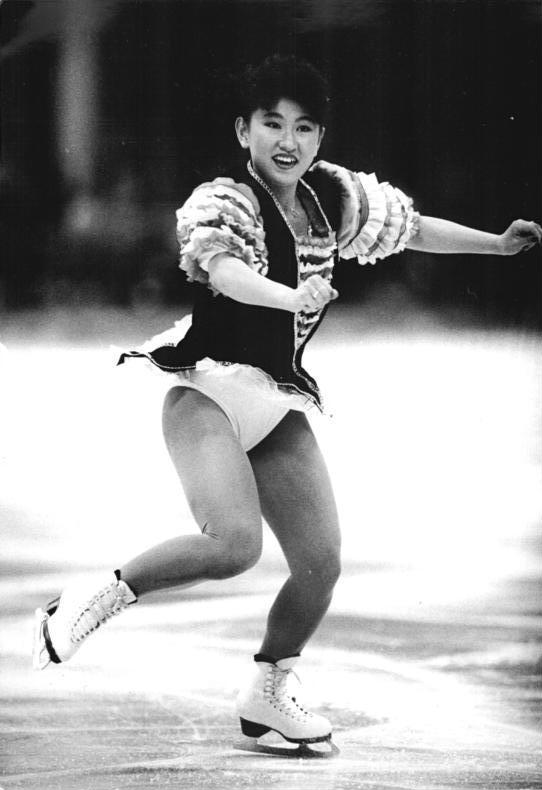
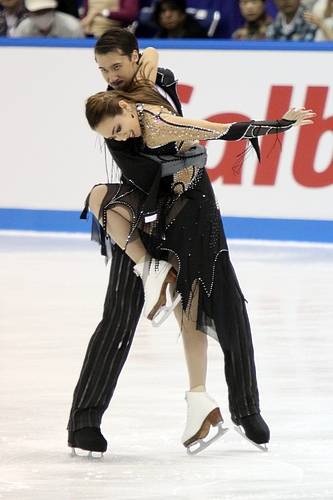
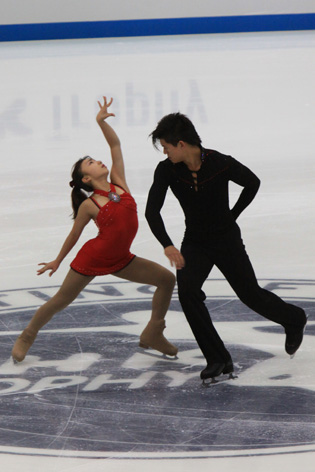
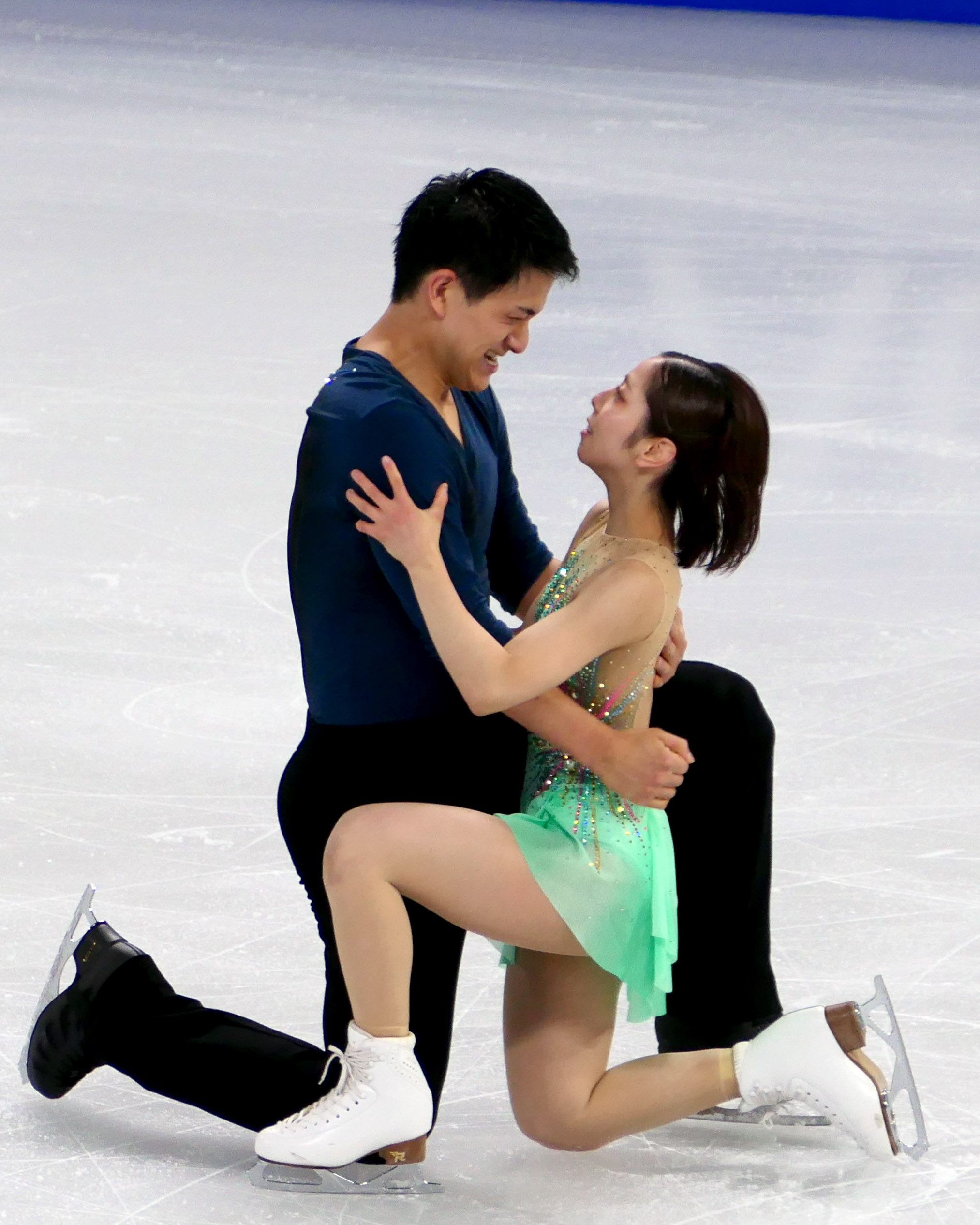
From left to right: Midori Ito won nine Japan Championship titles in women's singles; Chris Reed won ten Japan Championship titles in ice dance, seven of which were with his sister, Cathy Reed; Narumi Takahashi won six Japan Championship titles in pair skating, four of which were with Mervin Tran; and Ryuichi Kihara also won six Japan Championship titles in pair skating, two of which were with Riku Miura.

Records
Discipline	Most championship titles			
Discipline	Skater(s)	No.	Years	Ref.
Men's singles	Nobuo Satō	10	1956/57 – 1965/66	
Women's singles	Midori Ito	9	1984/85 – 1991/92; 1995/96	
Pairs	Ryuichi Kihara (Note: Ryuichi Kihara won two championship titles while partnered with Narumi Takahashi (2013/14–2014/15), two with Miu Suzaki (2017/18–2018/19), and two with Riku Miura (2019/20, 2024/25).)	6	2013/14 – 2014/15; 2017/18 – 2019/20; 2024/25	
Pairs	Narumi Takahashi (Note: Narumi Takahashi won four championship titles while partnered with Mervin Tran (2008/09–2011/12), and two with Ryuichi Kihara (2013/14–2014/15).)	6	2008/09 – 2011/12; 2013/14 – 2014/15	
Ice dance	Chris Reed (Note: Chris Reed won seven championship titles while partnered with Cathy Reed (2007/08–2010/11, 2012/13–2014/15), and three with Kana Muramoto (2015/16–2017/18).)	10	2007/08 – 2010/11; 2012/13 – 2017/18	

== See also ==
- Japan Junior Figure Skating Championships

== Works cited ==
- Japan Skating Federation (1981). 日本のスケート発達史: スピード・フィギュア・アイスホッケー [The Developmental History of Japanese Skating: Speed Skating, Figure Skating, Ice Hockey] (in Japanese). Tokyo: Bēsubōru Magajinsha.
