= Tomoe Kawabata =

Japanese figure skater

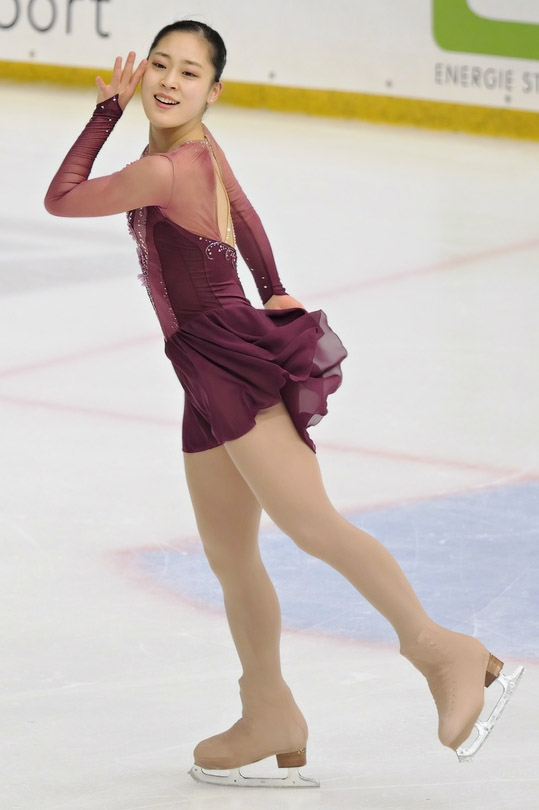
- Kawabata at the 2021 Cup of Austria

Personal information
- Native name: 川畑 和愛
- Born: January 12, 2002 (age 24) Nisshin, Aichi, Japan
- Home town: Tokyo, Japan
- Height: 1.57 m (5 ft 2 in)

Figure skating career
- Country: Japan
- Coach: Yutaka Higuchi; Yukina Ota
- Skating club: Waseda University
- Began skating: 2008
- Retired: 9 March, 2024
Japan Championships
Bronze medal – third place	2019–20 Tokyo	Singles

Tomoe Kawabata (川畑 和愛, Kawabata Tomoe; born January 12, 2002) is a retired Japanese figure skater. She is the 2019–20 Japanese national bronze medalist. She has represented Japan at two World Junior Championships.

== Career ==
=== Early years ===
Kawabata began learning to skate in 2008. Making her junior debut, she placed 15th at the 2015 Japan Championships. She competed as a senior at the 2018 Japan Championships and finished in 21st place. In January 2018, she won gold in the junior ladies' category at the Bavarian Open.

=== 2018–2019 season ===
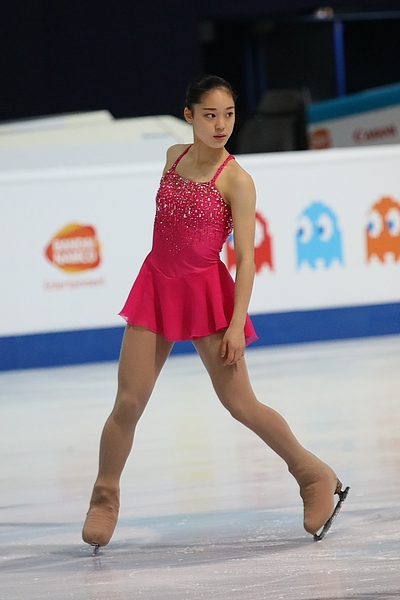
Kawabata at the 2019 World Junior Championships

Kawabata received two 2018–19 Junior Grand Prix (JGP) assignments. She placed fifth in the short program, sixth in the free skate, and fifth overall at JGP Slovakia, held in Bratislava, Slovakia, and had the same final result at JGP Slovenia held in Ljubljana, Slovenia.

She finished twelfth at the 2019 World Junior Championships. She was coached by former ice dancer Nakako Tsuzuki in Yokohama and Kanawaga.

=== 2019–2020 season ===
Kawabata made a coaching change in July 2019, joining Yukina Ota and Yutaka Higuchi at the Meiji Jingu rink in Tokyo. She again placed fifth at both of her JGP assignments. At the Japan Championships, she won silver in the junior event and then bronze in the senior event.

Finishing the season at the 2020 World Junior Championships, Kawabata placed fourteenth.

=== 2020–2021 season ===
Kawabata was invited to compete at the Japan Open as part of Team Red. She subsequently placed fifth at the domestic Eastern Sectionals Championship to qualify to the national championships. Kawabata made her senior debut on the Grand Prix at the 2020 NHK Trophy, where she was tenth. She placed eleventh at the 2020–21 Japan Championships.

== Programs ==
Season	Short program	Free skating	Exhibition
2021–2022	Les Parapluies de Cherbourg by Michel Legrand performed by Nana Mouskouri	Violin Concerto in D major, Op. 35 by Erich Korngold	
2020–2021	Tasogare no Waltz by Takashi Kako performed by Taro Hakase choreo. by David Wilson	Yumeji's Theme (from Yumeji) by Shigeru Umebayashi; Sikuriadas by Inti-Illimani choreo. by Stéphane Lambiel	The Blue Danube by Johann Strauss II choreo. by Stéphane Lambiel
2019–2020	The Blue Danube by Johann Strauss II choreo. by Stéphane Lambiel	Yumeji's Theme (from Yumeji) by Shigeru Umebayashi; Sikuriadas by Inti-Illimani choreo. by Stéphane Lambiel	La La Land by Justin Hurwitz
2018–2019	Scheherazade by Nikolai Rimsky-Korsakov choreo. by Nakako Tsuzuki	Concerto in F by George Gershwin performed by André Previn choreo. by Nakako Tsuzuki	Scheherazade by Nikolai Rimsky-Korsakov choreo. by Nakako Tsuzuki
2017–2018	The Swan (from The Carnival of the Animals) by Camille Saint-Saëns	La La Land by Justin Hurwitz	

== Competitive highlights ==
GP: Grand Prix; CS: Challenger Series; JGP: Junior Grand Prix

International
Event	14–15	15–16	16–17	17–18	18–19	19–20	20–21	21–22
GP NHK Trophy							10th	
CS Cup of Austria								9th
International: Junior
Junior Worlds					12th	14th		
JGP France						5th		
JGP Poland						5th		
JGP Slovakia					5th			
JGP Slovenia					5th			
Bavarian Open				1st				
Printemps						WD		
National
Japan Champ.				21st	10th	3rd	11th	WD
Japan Junior	15th	27th	27th	6th	3rd	2nd		
Team Events
Japan Open							2nd T 3rd P	

== Detailed results ==
Small medals for short and free programs awarded only at ISU Championships.

=== Senior results ===
2021–2022 season
Date	Event	SP	FS	Total
November 11–14, 2021	2021 CS Cup of Austria	6; 54.34	15; 95.62	9; 149.96
2020–2021 season
Date	Event	SP	FS	Total
December 24–27, 2020	2020–21 Japan Championships	9; 64.56	12; 121.62	11; 186.18
November 27–29, 2020	2020 NHK Trophy	8; 59.83	12; 102.41	10; 162.24
2019–2020 season
Date	Event	SP	FS	Total
December 18–22, 2019	2020 Japan Championships	7; 65.53	3; 128.43	3; 193.96
2018–2019 season
Date	Event	SP	FS	Total
December 20–24, 2018	2019 Japan Championships	7; 64.66	10; 118.45	10; 183.11
2017–2018 season
Date	Event	SP	FS	Total
December 20–24, 2017	2018 Japan Championships	22; 52.13	19; 106.03	21; 158.16

=== Junior results ===
2019–2020 season
Date	Event	SP	FS	Total
March 2–8, 2020	2020 World Junior Championships	10; 62.85	16; 96.62	14; 159.47
November 15–17, 2019	2020 Japan Junior Championships	2; 63.55	2; 115.40	2; 178.95
September 18–21, 2019	2019 JGP Poland	2; 67.70	7; 110.16	5; 177.86
August 21–24, 2019	2019 JGP France	6; 57.75	4; 113.92	5; 171.67
2018–2019 season
Date	Event	SP	FS	Total
March 4–10, 2019	2019 World Junior Championships	9; 57.65	13; 99.82	12; 157.47
November 23–25, 2018	2019 Japan Junior Championships	12; 52.05	3; 106.11	3; 158.16
October 3–10, 2018	2018 JGP Slovenia	1; 66.85	9; 100.64	5; 167.49
August 22–25, 2018	2018 JGP Slovakia	5; 58.89	6; 114.95	5; 173.84
2017–2018 season
Date	Event	SP	FS	Total
January 26–31, 2018	2018 Bavarian Open	1; 61.39	1; 107.66	1; 169.05
November 24–26, 2017	2018 Japan Junior Championships	3; 61.49	6; 106.03	6; 167.52
