= Junko Hiramatsu =

Japanese figure skater

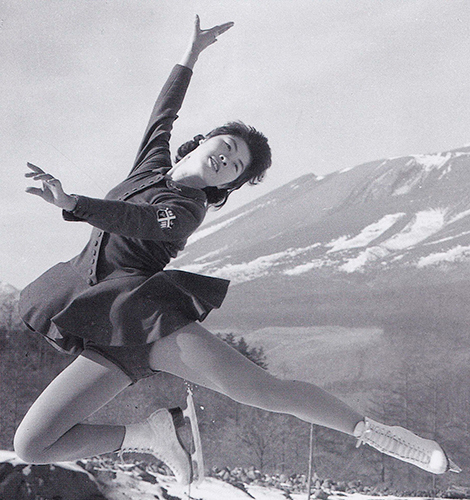
- Junko Hiramatsu in 1963

Personal information
- Other names: Junko Ueno
- Born: November 1, 1942 (age 84) Nishinomiya, Hyōgo, Japan
- Height: 1.64 m (5 ft 5 in)

Figure skating career
- Country: Japan
- Retired: 1964

Junko Hiramatsu, née: Ueno (平松 純子, Hiramatsu Junko; born November 1, 1942) is a Japanese former competitive figure skater who is now a coach and International Skating Union (ISU) official. She is a five-time Japanese national champion and represented Japan twice at the Winter Olympics, in 1960 and 1964, and she is the 1962 Winter Universiade champion.

Hiramatsu is an ISU referee and technical controller for Japan and was involved in creating the ISU Judging System. She took the Judge's Oath for the 1998 Winter Olympics in Nagano.

== Early life ==
Hiramatsu was born in Hyōgo Prefecture on November 1, 1942. Hiramatsu's mother, Kinuko Ueno, was a former competitive figure skater, and she decided to have her daughter skate as well. She started ballet lessons at age 6.

== Career ==
Hiramatsu in a lesson with her mother in 1953

Early in her career, Hiramatsu trained under Etsuko Inada a few times a month, and in summers, she traveled to Tokyo for lessons. Later, she was also coached by Tsuyako Yamashita. While she skated on lakes near Mount Rokkō several times as a child, there were no indoor rinks built in her area until she was 10 years old, at which point she began training, an age considered relatively late.

She was a four-time consecutive national champion from 1956 to 1959. She competed at her first World Championships in 1957, where she placed 17th. It was the first time she saw foreign skaters live in competition. The next was three years later, when she competed at the 1960 Winter Olympics. She was the flagbearer for Japan, the first woman to be selected for the role. She again placed 17th, and at the 1960 World Championships, she was 16th. A year later, she won a fifth national title.

In 1962, she competed at the 1962 Winter Universiade, which she won. The next year, she participated in her third 1963 World Championships and once more placed 17th.

Before the 1964 Winter Olympics, she spent her summer vacation training in Canada. She credited this experience with making her want to become a judge. During her time training, she noted that teenage athletes had already begun to judge advancement tests, meaning that they were educated on how to obtain higher scores by understanding the rules correctly. Another difference she noted was that rinks there had ice resurfacer machines, and figure skaters trained on private ice time; she and other Japanese skaters at the time skated during public hours on rinks resurfaced by hand. At the Olympics, she finished in 22nd place.

Hiramatsu competed at the 1964 Winter Universiade, where she won silver behind compatriot Miwa Fukuhara, then retired from competition.

== Post-competitive career ==
Hiramatsu obtained her international judging credentials in 1971. In 1973, she moved to New York in the United States with her husband. She judged US competitions, and her location also meant that she was able to travel to European competitions more easily.

She now works as a referee and technical controller for Japan; she performed this duty at the pairs event at the 2006 Winter Olympics. She has also been on the ISU's technical committee and was involved in creating and training judges in the International Judging System that replaced the 6.0 system. In addition, she was appointed a professor at Kobe Pharmaceutical University and has taught classes on sports. By 2017, she had retired from the university. At the 1998 Winter Olympics in Nagano, she took the Judge's Oath.

In 2006, she was elected a board member of the Japan Skating Federation.

She is an honorary committee member of the Japan Olympic Association. In 2017, she was awarded the Order of the Rising Sun, 4th class.

== Results ==
International
Event	1956	1957	1958	1959	1960	1961	1962	1963	1964
Winter Olympics					17th				22nd
World Champ.		17th			16th			17th	
National
Japan Champ.	1st	1st	1st	1st	2nd	1st	2nd	3rd	3rd
