= Haruko Okamoto =

Japanese figure skater and coach

Personal information
- Native name: 岡本 治子
- Born: November 16, 1945 (age 80) Ikeda, Osaka, Japan

Figure skating career
- Country: Japan
- Discipline: Women's singles

Japanese name
- Kanji: 岡本治子
- Kana: いしだ はるこ
Transcriptions
- Romanization: Okamoto Haruko

Haruko Okamoto (née Ishida) (岡本 治子, Okamoto Haruko; born November 16, 1945) is a Japanese figure skating coach and former competitor. She retired from competitive skating shortly after placing 26th in the 1968 Winter Olympic Games.

== Early and personal life ==
Okamoto was born in Ikeda, Osaka on November 16, 1945. She had three younger sisters; one was Ayumi Ishida, an actress, and another Yuri Ishida, a singer. Yuri married Rei Nakanishi, who wrote a novel inspired by the family, including Haruko. Her siblings also skated.

She graduated from Doshisha University. She has three children, two sons and a daughter.

== Career ==
Okamoto began skating in third grade. At first, she started skating because her mother ran a cafe at a rink, but she improved to the point where it was suggested she start professional training, though her father initially opposed it. She was coached by Etsuko Inada. Okamoto recalled that her mother was intensely focused on her career and that she was "scared" of both her and Inada. When Okamoto was younger, Inada would travel to coach her, but a year-round rink opened in Tokyo by the time Okamoto reached middle school, and she would travel there to take lessons from Inada.

She missed a season in middle school due to developing a liver condition that led to her spending three months in the hospital. Okamoto described the period when she first returned to skating as "aimless", but by her second or third year of high school, she made the personal decision to focus on training. Reflecting on her career, she said she found enjoyment in sport only in her university years.

In the 1965–1966 season, she won the bronze medal at the Japanese Championships. She competed at the 1966 Winter Universiade, where she placed 5th.

Okamoto won the bronze medal at the 1967 Japanese Championships. In January, at the 1968 Winter Universiade, she placed 4th. In February, she competed at the 1968 Winter Olympics, where she finished 26th. She later said of her Olympic experience, "I'm glad I was able to compete there at the end of my career. Maybe it was a reward for continuing for so long." At the 1968 World Championships, she came in 19th place.

She ended her competitive career after the 1967–1968 season when she finished university.

== Post-competitive career ==
Okamoto works as a coach in Osaka. Her students have included Reiko Kobayashi, Satoko Miyahara, and Yukiko Kashihara. Her focus as a coach is on basic skating skills. She currently works in a team headed by Mie Hamada.

She was the inspiration for a character in the asadora morning drama series "Teruteru Kazoku".

== Results ==
Event	1966	1967	1968
Winter Olympic Games			26th
World Championships			19th
Japanese Championships	3rd	4th	3rd
