= Yutaka Higuchi =

Yutaka Higuchi may refer to:

- Yutaka Higuchi (figure skater) (born 1949), figure skating coach and commentator, former Olympian
- Yutaka Higuchi (musician) (born 1967), rock musician, bassist of Buck-Tick
