= Shoko Ishikawa =

Japanese figure skater

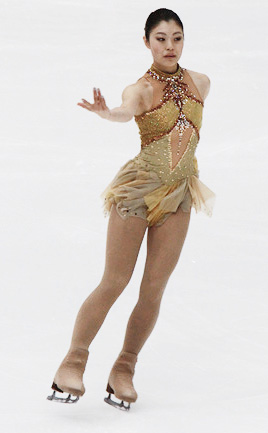
- Ishikawa in 2009.

Personal information
- Full name: Shoko Ishikawa
- Born: May 12, 1990 (age 36) Tokyo, Japan
- Height: 1.66 m (5 ft 5 in)

Figure skating career
- Country: Japan
- Coach: Nobuo Sato, Kumiko Sato
- Skating club: Shinyokohama Skate Center
- Began skating: 1998

Shoko Ishikawa (石川 翔子, Ishikawa Shōko; born May 12, 1990) is a Japanese former competitive figure skater. She is the 2010 NRW Trophy champion, 2011 Ondrej Nepela Memorial silver medalist, and 2008 Japanese junior bronze medalist.

== Programs ==
Season	Short program	Free skating
2011–12	La Rosa performed by Vale Tango choreo. by Kenji Miyamoto	Miss Saigon by Claude-Michel Schönberg choreo. by Shizuka Arakawa
2010–11	Ice Queen by Paul Dinletir	Violin Concerto in D major by Pyotr Tchaikovsky
2009–10	Incantation (from Cirque du Soleil's Quidam) by Benoît Jutras	Violin Concerto in D major by Pyotr Tchaikovsky
2007–08	Vamo Alla Flamenco	Titanic by James Horner

== Competitive highlights ==
GP: Grand Prix; JGP: Junior Grand Prix

International
Event	03–04	04–05	05–06	06–07	07–08	08–09	09–10	10–11	11–12	12–13	14–15
GP NHK Trophy							10th		10th		
Crystal Skate							3rd				
NRW Trophy								1st			
Nepela Memorial									2nd		
Universiade								5th			
International: Junior
JGP Czech Rep.						4th					
JGP Estonia					5th						
JGP Hungary				5th							
JGP South Africa						4th					
Challenge Cup					2nd J.						
National
Japan Champ.					8th		26th	9th	15th	26th	19th
Japan Junior	11th	22nd	6th	12th	3rd	6th					
J. = Junior level
