= Figure skating at the 1936 Winter Olympics – Men's singles =

Figure skating at the Olympics

Men's singles at the IV Olympic Winter Games
- Venue: Olympia-Kunsteisstadion
- Dates: 9–14 February 1936
- Competitors: 25 from 10 nations

Medalists
1st place, gold medalist(s)		Karl Schäfer	Austria
2nd place, silver medalist(s)		Ernst Baier	Germany
3rd place, bronze medalist(s)		Felix Kaspar	Austria

The men's individual skating event was held as part of the figure skating at the 1936 Winter Olympics. It was the sixth appearance of the event, which had previously been held twice at the Summer Olympics in 1908 and 1920 and at all three Winter Games from 1924 onward. The competition was held from Sunday, 9 February to Friday, 14 February 1936. Twenty-five figure skaters from twelve nations competed.

== Results ==
Karl Schäfer successfully defended his 1932 title.

Rank	Name	Nation	CF	FS	Total points	Places
1	Karl Schäfer	Austria	1	1	422.7	7
2	Ernst Baier	Germany	3	4	400.8	24
3	Felix Kaspar	Austria	5	2	400.1	24
4	Montgomery Wilson	Canada	4	5	394.5	30
5	Graham Sharp	Great Britain	2	6	394.1	34
6	Jack Dunn	Great Britain	8	3	387.7	42
7	Marcus Nikkanen	Finland	6	9	380.7	54
8	Elemér Terták	Hungary	9	8	379.0	56
9	Dénes Pataky	Hungary	7	11	374.8	60
10	Freddie Tomlins	Great Britain	11	10	364.2	77
11	Leopold Linhart	Austria	16	7	364.2	80
12	Robin Lee	United States	13	13	363.0	80
13	Erle Reiter	United States	12	17	352.9	95
14	Hellmut May	Austria	14	15	354.8	96
15	Toshiichi Katayama	Japan	17	16	347.4	108
16	Geoffrey Yates	Great Britain	10	20	348.7	110
17	Lucian Büeler	Switzerland	15	21	343.6	119
18	Günther Lorenz	Germany	19	12	343.5	119
19	Roman Turuşanco	Romania	21	14	337.8	128
20	Kazuyoshi Oimatsu	Japan	20	19	325.4	139
21	Zenjiro Watanabe	Japan	23	18	325.4	147
22	George Hill	United States	18	23	325.1	148
23	Tsugio Hasegawa	Japan	24	22	314.6	162
24	Jaroslav Sadílek	Czechoslovakia	22	24	305.0	161
25	Verners Auls	Latvia	25	25	222.6	175

Referee:

- (Sweden) Ulrich Salchow

Judges:

- (United States) Charles M. Rotch
- (United Kingdom) W. Ros Sharpe
- (Finland) Walter Jakobsson
- (Canada) John Z. Machado (CF only)
- (Germany) Fritz Schober (FS only)
- (Austria) Rudolf Kaler
- (Hungary) László von Orbán
- (Czechoslovakia) Jiří Sýkora
