= Koji Okajima =

Japanese figure skating coach

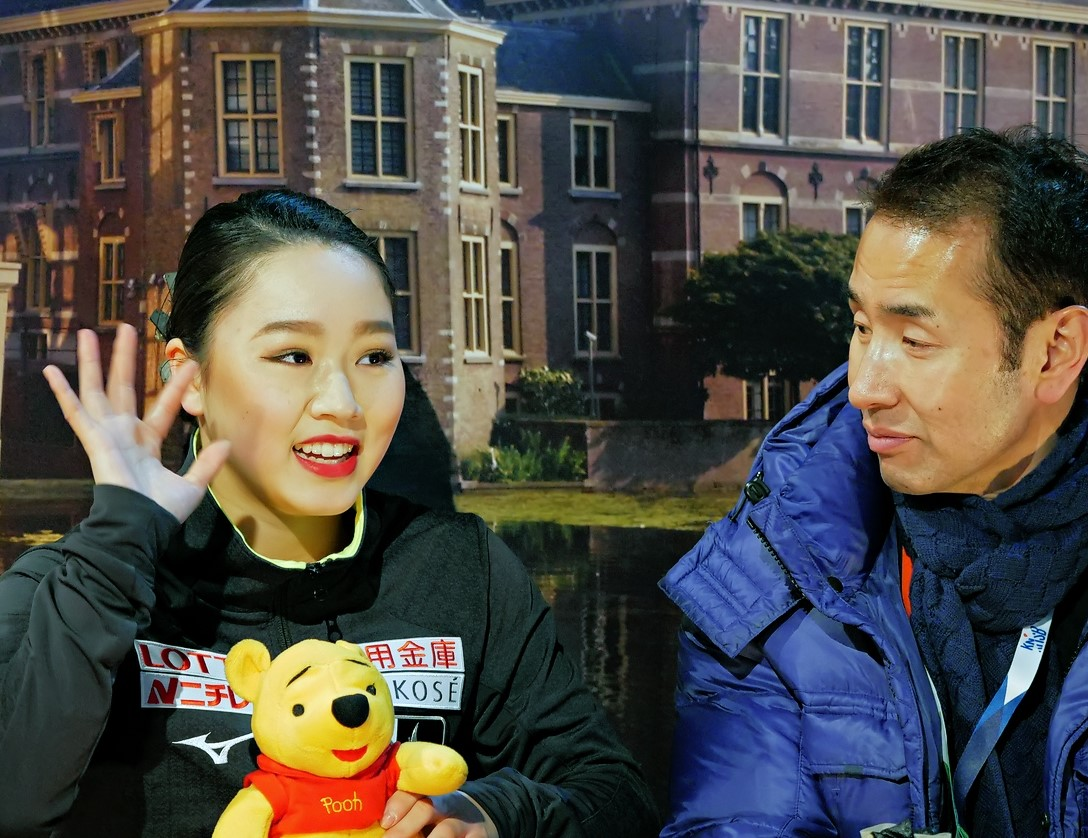
- Okajima (right) with longtime pupil, Wakaba Higuchi, at the 2018 Challenge Cup

Personal information
- Native name: 岡島功治
- Born: 23 March 1957 (age 69) Hokkaido, Japan

Figure skating career
- Country: Japan

Koji Okajima (岡島功治, Okajima Koji; born March 23, 1957) is a retired Japanese competitive pair skater and figure skating coach.

With pair partner, Naoko Asano, he is the 1976–77 Japanese National bronze medalist and with pair partner, Mutsumi Takezaki, he is the 1978–79 Japanese National silver medalist.

== Biography ==
Okajima was born on March 23, 1957, in Hokkaido, Japan.

As a pair skater, he competed at the 1976–77 Japanese Championships with pair partner, Naoko Asano, winning the bronze medal. He also competed at the 1978–79 Japanese National with Mutsumi Takezaki, winning the silver medal.

He became a figure skating coach following the end of his competitive career and graduated from Nihon University.

Okajima initially coached at the Shin-Matsudo Ice Arena in Matsudo, Chiba Prefecture before relocating to the Meiji Jingu Gaien Ice Skating Rink in Shinjuku City, Tokyo.

His current students include:

- Daiya Ebihara
- Wakaba Higuchi
- Kao Miura
- Rion Sumiyoshi

His former students include:

- Shoko Ishikawa
- Kazumi Kishimoto
- Akari Matsuoka
- Yuki Nishino
- Mao Shimada
- Nana Takeda
- Hirofumi Torii

== Competitive highlights ==
=== With Takezaki ===
National
Event	1978–79
Japan	2nd

=== With Asano ===
National
Event	1976–77
Japan	3rd
