= Takashi Mura =

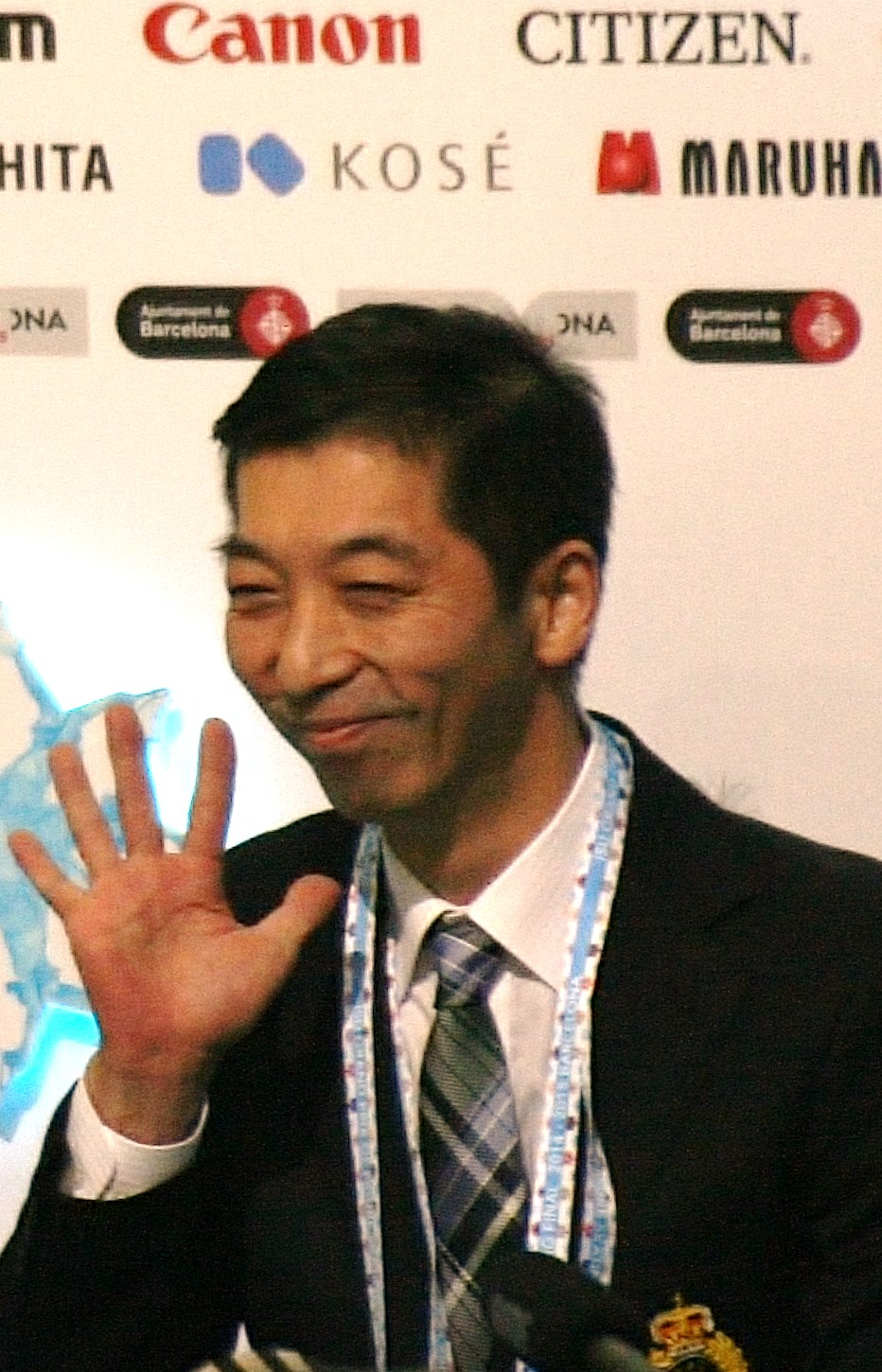

Personal information
- Born: November 11, 1960 (age 65) Tottori, Japan

Figure skating career
- Country: Japan
- Retired: 1984
Medal record
Figure skating: Men's singles
Representing Japan
World Junior Championships
Silver medal – second place	1976 Megève	Men's singles

Takashi Mura

Japanese name
- Kanji: 無良 隆志
- Kana: むら たかし
Transcriptions
- Romanization: Mura Takashi

Takashi Mura (無良 隆志, Mura Takashi; born November 11, 1960) is a Japanese figure skating coach and former competitor. He is the 1976 World Junior silver medalist, winning a medal at the inaugural event. He went on to win six medals in singles at the Japan Figure Skating Championships, and won it twice in pairs. His highest placement as a singles skater at the World Figure Skating Championships was 12th, in 1982. As a pair skater, he placed 12th with Yukiko Okabe in 1980, and 14th with Toshimi Ito in 1983.

He is the father and coach of Takahito Mura. He has also coached Yosuke Takeuchi to the Olympics and Mirai Nagasu.

== Results ==
=== Single skating ===
International
Event	75–76	77–78	78–79	79–80	80–81	81–82	82–83	83–84
Worlds					15th	12th		
NHK Trophy				6th	4th	7th	9th	
Prague Skate								1st
International: Junior
Junior Worlds	2nd							
National
Japan Champ.		3rd		3rd	2nd	3rd	2nd	2nd

=== Pair skating with Ito ===
International
Event	1980–81	1981–82	1982–83	1983–84
World Championships			14th	
NHK Trophy	3rd	6th		
Ennia Challenge Cup				6th
Prague Skate				3rd
National
Japan Championships	1st			

=== Pair skating with Okabe ===
International
Event	1979–80
World Championships	12th
NHK Trophy	5th
Ennia Challenge Cup	5th
National
Japan Championships	1st
