= Verners Auls =

Latvian figure skater

Personal information
- Nationality: Latvian
- Born: 5 August 1889 Riga, Latvia, Russian Empire

Sport
- Sport: Figure skating

Verners Auls (5 August 1889 - 23 November 1976) was a Latvian figure skater. He competed in the men's singles event at the 1936 Winter Olympics.
