= Hiroyuki Suzuki (figure skater) =

Japanese ice dancer

Japanese name
- Kanji: 鈴木弘幸
- Kana: すずき ひろゆき
Transcriptions
- Romanization: Suzuki Hiroyuki

Hiroyuki Suzuki (鈴木 弘幸, Suzuki Hiroyuki; born March 5, 1959 in Kagoshima, Japan) is a Japanese figure skater who is now a coach. He competed in ice dancing with Tomoko Tanaka (his wife). They placed 18th in the 1988 Winter Olympic Games. They are three-time Japanese National Champions.

== Competitive highlights ==
Event	1981-1982	1982-1983	1983-1984	1984-1985	1985-1986	1986-1987	1987-1988
Winter Olympic Games							18
World Championships					14	16	19
Japanese Championships	3	3	2	2	1	1	1

== See also ==
- Figure skating at the 1988 Winter Olympics
