= Yōsuke Takeuchi =

Japanese figure skater

Personal information
- Born: August 15, 1979 (age 47) Tokyo, Japan
- Height: 1.65 m (5 ft 5 in)

Figure skating career
- Country: Japan
- Skating club: Hosei University
- Began skating: 1983
- Retired: 2002

Japanese name
- Kanji: 竹内 洋輔
- Kana: たけうち ようすけ
Transcriptions
- Romanization: Takeuchi Yōsuke

Yōsuke Takeuchi (竹内 洋輔, Takeuchi Yōsuke; born August 15, 1979) is a former Japanese figure skater. He is the 1999 World Junior bronze medalist and the 1999 & 2002 Japanese national champion. He represented Japan at the 2002 Winter Olympics, placing 22nd. He was coached by Takashi Mura and his programs were choreographed by Tatiana Tarasova and Nikolai Morozov.

Currently he is the director of athlete development in figure skating branch of Japan Skating Federation.

== Programs ==
Season	Short program	Free skating
2001–2002	Night on Bald Mountain by Modest Mussorgsky	Tarzan by Mark Mancina
2000–2001	Night on Bald Mountain by Modest Mussorgsky	The 13th Warrior by Jerry Goldsmith

== Results ==
GP: Grand Prix; JGP: Junior Grand Prix

International
Event	95–96	96–97	97–98	98–99	99–00	00–01	01–02
Olympics							22nd
Worlds							27th
Four Continents				12th		10th	
GP Cup of Russia						8th	6th
GP NHK Trophy					11th		
GP Skate America					11th		
GP Skate Canada							8th
GP Sparkassen						8th	
Nebelhorn Trophy	3rd						
Universiade				11th			
International: Junior
Junior Worlds		5th		3rd			
JGP Final			5th	5th			
JGP Bulgaria			3rd				
JGP Hungary				2nd			
JGP Mexico				1st			
JGP Ukraine			3rd				
National
Japan Champ.	5th	4th	3rd	1st	4th	3rd	1st
Japan Junior	3rd	3rd	1st	1st			
