= Junko Yaginuma =

Japanese figure skater (born 1973)

Personal information
- Born: April 1, 1973 (age 53) Minato, Tokyo, Japan
- Height: 1.57 m (5 ft 2 in)

Figure skating career
- Country: Japan
- Discipline: Women's singles
- Retired: 1995

Japanese name
- Kanji: 八木沼純子
- Kana: やぎぬま じゅんこ
Transcriptions
- Romanization: Yaginuma Junko

Junko Yaginuma (八木沼 純子, Yaginuma Junko; born April 1, 1973) is a Japanese former figure skater. She is now a figure skating commentator and sports journalist as well as a coach. She is the 1993 Winter Universiade champion and a two-time consecutive World Junior silver medalist (1988–89), and she placed 14th at the 1988 Winter Olympics.

== Career ==
Yaginuma began skating at age 5 and was coached by Miwa Fukuhara. When she was in fourth grade, at around age 10, she transferred schools to make it easier to train.

In December 1987, she competed at the 1988 World Junior Championships, where she won the silver medal. Shortly after, at age 14, Yaginuma was selected for the 1988 Winter Olympics. This was the first time in nearly thirty years that a junior high school-aged skater was chosen, and she struggled to deal with the press attention. The media nicknamed her the "Gokumi of the Ice", referencing popular actress Kumiko Goto. At the Olympics, she finished in 14th place. The following season, she won a second consecutive World Junior silver medal.

In 1992, she won the silver medal in the special Interpretive Program event at Skate Canada International. The next year, she won the 1993 Winter Universiade.

In 1994, she won the bronze medal at the 1994 NHK Trophy. She finished her competitive career the next year, after the 1995 World Championships.

During her career, Yaginuma was particularly known for her spins.

== Post-competitive career ==
Yaginuma graduated from the School of Education at Waseda University. She went into sports journalism after retiring from competition and covered three Olympic Games for Fuji Television between 1995 and 1998. Due to her experience with the press during her time with an athlete, she initially had difficulty with the work; for example, she was reluctant to conduct interviews if she thought that athlete didn't want to speak with the media, and she felt she struggled to ask good questions. Writing in 2005, she expressed that contemporary athletes were much more skilled at interacting with media than she had been. She hosted the monthly show "Figure Skating TV!" for Fuji Television until it ended in 2025, and she became a figure skating commentator beginning with the 2010 Winter Olympics

She performed as a professional skater in the ice show Prince Ice World for 18 years. In 2019, she began teaching figure skating to students of a variety of ages at the suggestion of her own coach. In order to do so, she underwent surgery for bunions, which she had since elementary school and which had prevented her from wearing skates for long periods. She had previously dealt with the condition by periodically removing her skates during training, or at events, when she was not performing, but she could not do that as a coach.

Yaginuma guest-starred as herself in the fourth episode of Juken Sentai Gekiranger, teaching the Gekirangers how to ice skate.

== Results ==
International
Event	86–87	87–88	88–89	89–90	90–91	91–92	92–93	93–94	94–95
Olympics		14th							
Worlds		21st	15th	12th	11th	19th	25th		12th
Skate America				4th		8th			
Skate Canada					5th				
Inter. de Paris								8th	
NHK Trophy				6th	8th	5th	12th		3rd
Nebelhorn				3rd					
Universiade							1st		
International: Junior
Junior Worlds	7th	2nd	2nd						
National
Japan Champ.		2nd	2nd	3rd	3rd	3rd	2nd	4th	2nd
