= Kazumi Onishi =

Japanese figure skater

Personal information
- Native name: 大西 一美
- Other names: Kazumi Yamashita
- Born: October 18, 1948 (age 78) Osaka Prefecture, Japan

Figure skating career
- Country: Japan
- Retired: 1972

Japanese name
- Kanji: 大西一美
- Kana: おおにし かずみ
Transcriptions
- Romanization: Ōnishi Kazumi

Kazumi Onishi (née Yamashita) (大西 一美, Ōnishi Kazumi; born October 18, 1948) is a Japanese former competitive figure skater. She is a four-time Japanese national champion and competed twice at the Winter Olympics, placing 14th in 1968 and 10th in 1972. She is the 1968 Winter Universiade and 1971 Richmond Trophy bronze medalist.

== Career ==
Onishi's mother was figure skater Tsuyako Yamashita, who also coached her. They were the first mother-daughter pair to both win the Japan Championships. At the time, competitions were often held outdoors, and Onishi described the conditions at some as a "battle against nature".

Onishi won her first medal at the national championships, a bronze, in the 1964–1965 season. In 1965, she won the National Athletic Winter Games in the high school girls division as well as the Inter-High School Championships. In the 1966–1967 season, she won a second bronze national medal.

In 1967, Onishi began to be trained by Arnold Gerschwiler. The next year, she won silver at the national championships. She won bronze at the 1968 Winter Universiade, and she competed at the 1968 Winter Olympics, where she finished 14th. Onishi later reflected that Peggy Fleming's performance there left a deep impression on her and was one she used as an example to her students. After the Olympics, at her first World Championships, she finished in 18th.

Onishi won her first of four consecutive national titles in the 1968–1969 season. Speaking about her career later, she said that, "Those around me decided that naturally I would win, and because of things like that, I also thought that I needed to win, and it was a heavy mental burden. When I won, more than feeling happy, I was relieved. But it was satisfying to win new titles." She placed 11th at the 1969 World Championships.

In November 1969, Onishi became the first Japanese skater to compete in the United Kingdom when she competed at the Richmond Trophy. She placed 7th. At the 1970 World Championships in March, she placed 16th. The week after, she also competed at the Kennedy Memorial Winter Games in Lake Placid, New York. She placed second in the compulsory figures. She finished fourth after her free skate, set to Madama Butterfly. That year, she also won the national collegiate championships.

In 1971, a test event for the 1972 Winter Olympics was held. Onishi placed second behind Julie Lynn Holmes. She was 13th at the 1971 World Championships.

Onishi won bronze at the Richmond Trophy in late 1971. At the 1972 Olympics, she skated to music from The Red Poppy; Skating magazine noted she did not land a double Axel jump but praised her performance. She placed 10th.

== Post-competitive career ==
Onishi graduated from Kwansei Gakuin University. After her competitive career, she became a coach, including for her own daughter.

She was the inspiration for a character in the asadora morning drama series "Teruteru Kazoku".

== Competitive highlights ==
International
Event	64–65	66–67	67–68	68–69	69–70	70–71	71–72
Winter Olympics			14th				10th
World Champ.			18th	11th	16th	13th	
Kennedy Memorial					4th		
Richmond Trophy					7th		3rd
Winter Universiade			3rd				
National
Japanese Champ.	3rd	3rd	2nd	1st	1st	1st	1st
