= Ryuichi Obitani =

Japanese figure skater

Personal information
- Native name: 帯谷竜一
- Full name: Ryuichi Obitani
- Born: 4 September 1908
- Died: Unknown

Figure skating career
- Country: Japan
- Discipline: Men's singles

Ryuichi Obitani (帯谷 竜一; older form 帶谷 龍一, Obitani Ryūichi; born September 4, 1908, date of death unknown) was a Japanese figure skater. He represented Japan at the 1932 Winter Olympics and World Figure Skating Championships in 1932.

== Career ==
During Obitani's career, there were very few resources for figure skaters in Japan, with only one small, artificial rink available for training; he and other Japanese skaters typically trained on mountain lakes. They also had no coaches available and had never seen high-level skaters in person before traveling to compete in the 1932 Olympics and World championships. Instead, Obitani and other Japanese skaters taught themselves from books and photographs.

Obitani placed 4th at the first Japanese Figure Skating Championships in 1930, then won the silver medal at the second in 1931. He missed the next Championships due to the Olympics and was 4th again the next year.

At the 1932 Winter Olympics, Obitani placed 12th. While they were in New York for the Olympics, he and teammate Kazuyoshi Oimatsu took lessons from Willy Böckl. Obitani wrote that he was disheartened by his placement at the Olympics and couldn't sleep, but he ultimately decided to compete at the 1932 World Championships held shortly afterward. Though he spoke little English, he attempted to make friends with the other skaters, writing afterward that "international friendship is more important than the Olympic Games themselves." He also wrote that he decided to skate in the Japanese style at the World Championships rather than attempting to copy the best foreign skaters, which he felt helped him compete better. He finished in 8th place.

In 1949, it was reported in Skating magazine that he no longer skated. However, he went on to become a figure skating judge, and he judged at the 1972 Winter Olympics and 1977 World Championships.

== Results ==
Competition placements between the 1929–30 and 1932–33 season
Season	1929–30	1930–31	1931–32	1932–33
Winter Olympics			12th	
World Championships			8th	
Japan Figure Skating Championships	4th	2nd		4th
