= Toshikazu Katayama =

Japanese figure skater

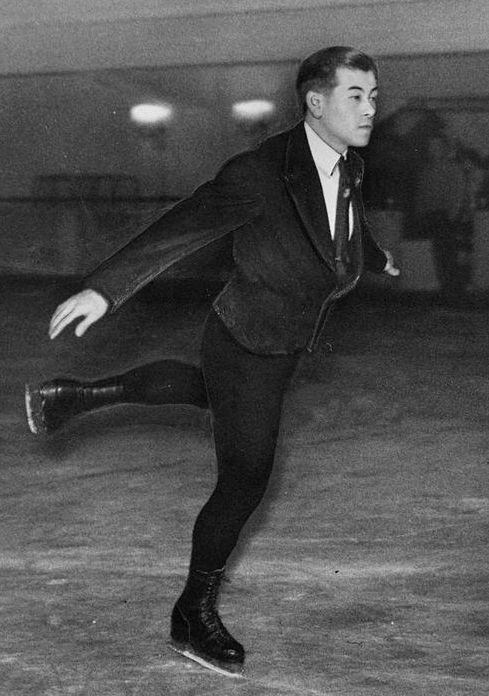
Katayama c. 1935

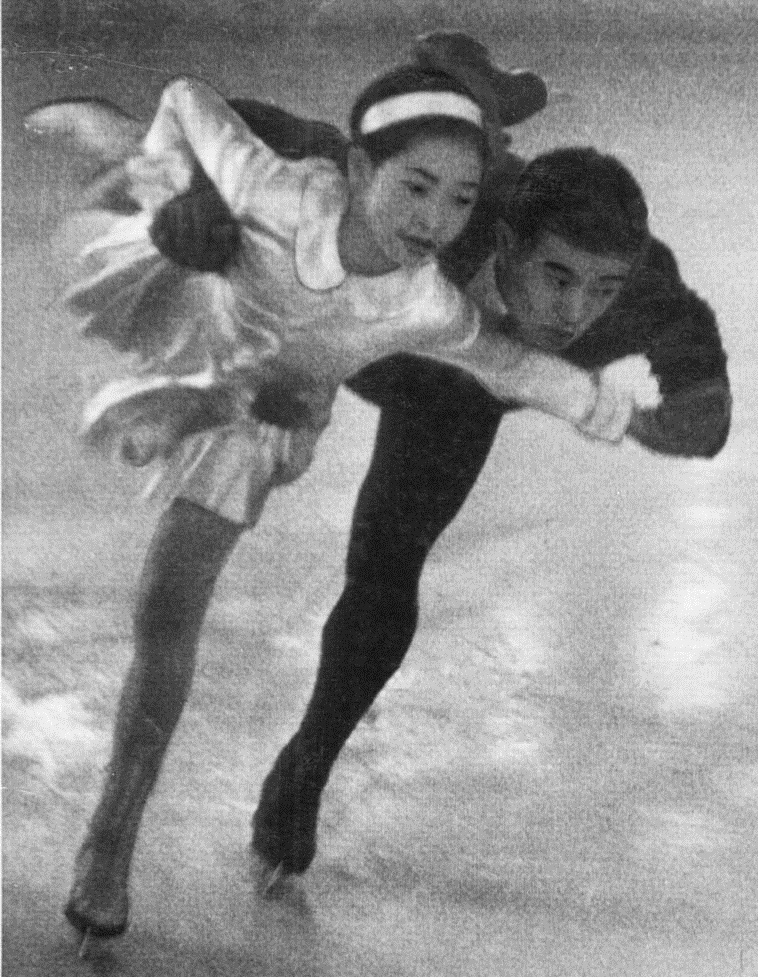
Katayama with Etsuko Inada at an exhibition gala in 1937

Toshikazu Katayama (片山 敏一, Katayama Toshiichi; born June 5, 1913) was a Japanese figure skater. He won the Japan Figure Skating Championships in 1933–1935, 1937 and 1938. In 1936, he represented Japan at the Winter Olympics, World Championships and European Championships. He studied and trained at Kwansei Gakuin University.

In 1949, Fritzi Burger reported to Skating magazine that he was married with two children and still skated occasionally, including with Burger in a show.

== Results ==
Event	1932	1933	1934	1935	1936	1937	1938
Winter Olympics					15th		
World Championships					13th		
European Championships					7th		
Japanese Championships	2nd	1st	1st	1st		1st	1st
