= Fumio Igarashi =

Japanese figure skater

Personal information
- Born: November 6, 1958 (age 68) Tokyo, Japan

Figure skating career
- Country: Japan
- Retired: 1982

Fumio Igarashi (五十嵐 文男, Igarashi Fumio; November 6, 1958) is a Japanese former figure skater. He is the 1977 and 1979-1981 Japanese national champion. His highest placement at the World Championships was fourth, in 1981. He placed ninth at the 1980 Winter Olympics. He was coached by Frank Carroll.

After retirement from competitive skating, he was employed by Dentsu, an advertising agency. In addition, he worked as a skating consultant for NHK until 2006.

== Results ==
Event	74–75	75–76	76–77	77–78	78–79	79–80	80–81	81–82
Winter Olympics						9th		
World Championships				7th	6th	8th	4th	9th
Skate Canada					1st			
NHK Trophy						2nd	1st	1st
Nebelhorn Trophy			1st					
St. Gervais			2nd					
Japan Championships	3rd	3rd	3rd	1st	2nd	1st	1st	1st
