= Tomoko Tanaka =

Japanese ice dancer

Japanese name
- Kanji: 田中智子
- Kana: たなか ともこ
Transcriptions
- Romanization: Tanaka Tomoko

Tomoko Tanaka (田中 智子, Tanaka Tomoko; born July 25, 1958 in Kagoshima, Japan) is a Japanese ice dancer. Competing with Hiroyuki Suzuki (her husband), she placed 18th in the 1988 Winter Olympic Games. She was a three-time Japanese National Champion.

== Competitive highlights ==
Event	1981-1982	1982-1983	1983-1984	1984-1985	1985-1986	1986-1987	1987-1988
Winter Olympic Games							18
World Championships					14	16	19
Japanese Championships	3	3	2	2	1	1	1

== See also ==
- Figure skating at the 1988 Winter Olympics
