= Sachie Yuki =

Japanese figure skater

Personal information
- Native name: 結城幸枝
- Born: March 23, 1968 (age 58)

Figure skating career
- Country: Japan
- Retired: c. 1988

Sachie Yuki (Japanese: 結城幸枝; born March 23, 1968) is a Japanese former competitive figure skater. She placed 5th at the 1983 World Junior Championships, held in December 1982 in Sarajevo, Yugoslavia. Competing internationally on the senior level, she won the bronze medal at the 1983 Ennia Challenge Cup, silver at the 1983 Prague Skate, silver at the 1985 Prague Skate and bronze at the 1985 Danubius Thermal Trophy. She became a three-time Japanese national medalist, winning silver in 1985–86 and bronze in 1982–83 and 1984–85.

== Competitive highlights ==
International
Event	79–80	80–81	81–82	82–83	83–84	84–85	85–86	86–87	87–88
Ennia Challenge					3rd				
NHK Trophy		5th	6th	6th		6th	4th	8th	
Danubius Trophy							3rd		
Prague Skate					2nd		2nd		
Skate America								7th	
Moscow News									9th
Universiade								11th	
International: Junior
Junior Worlds				5th					
National
Japan		6th		3rd		3rd	2nd		8th
Japan Junior	2nd				2nd				
