= Mitsuhiro Murata =

Japanese figure skater

Japanese name
- Kanji: 村田光弘
- Kana: むらた みつひろ
Transcriptions
- Romanization: Murata Mitsuhiro

Mitsuhiro Murata
Personal information
- Born: January 26, 1970 (age 56) Aomori, Japan
- Height: 1.73 m (5 ft 8 in)

Figure skating career
- Country: Japan
- Retired: 1992

Mitsuhiro Murata (村田 光弘, Murata Mitsuhiro; born January 26, 1970) is a Japanese former competitive figure skater who is now a coach. He placed 23rd in the 1992 Winter Olympics.

== Results ==
International
Event	1988–89	1989–90	1990–91	1991–92
Winter Olympics				23rd
World Championships				23rd
NHK Trophy		10th	10th	
Skate America		5th	15th	
Skate Canada		9th		
National
Japan Championships	2nd	3rd	2nd	2nd
