= Kazuyoshi Oimatsu =

Japanese figure skater

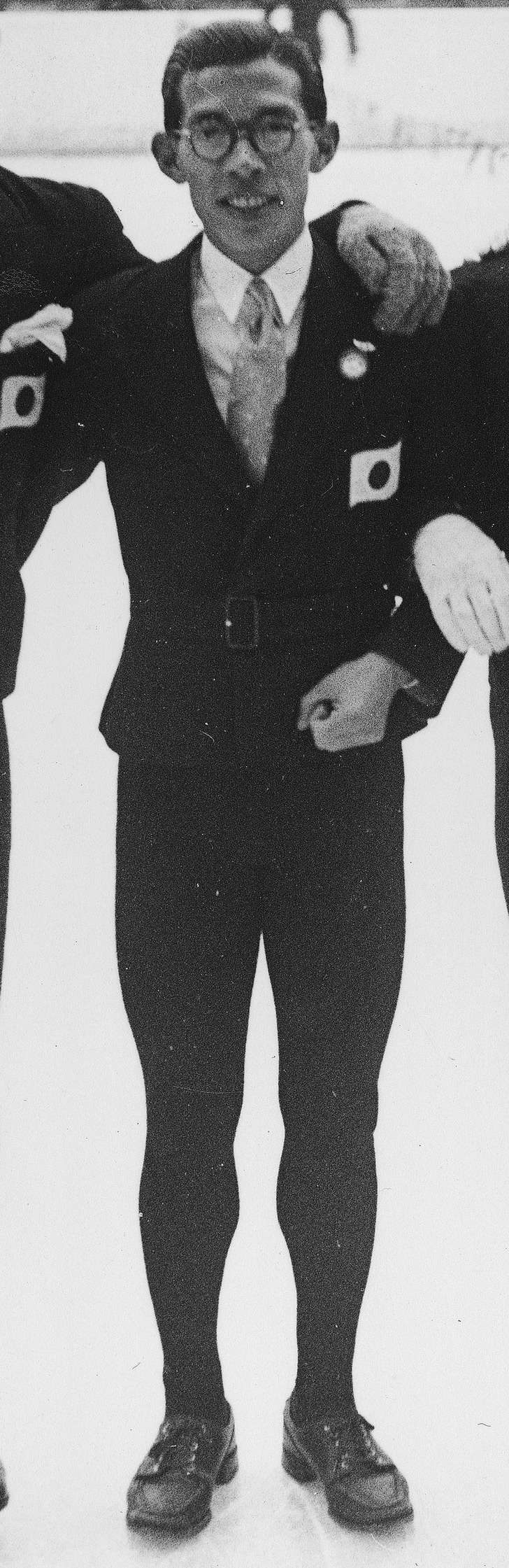
- Oimatsu at the 1936 Winter Olympics

Personal information
- Native name: 老松 一吉
- Born: 30 October 1911
- Died: 24 March 2001 (aged 89)

Figure skating career
- Country: Japan
- Discipline: Men's singles

Kazuyoshi Oimatsu (老松 一吉, Oimatsu Kazuyoshi; 30 October 1911 – 24 March 2001) was a Japanese figure skater who competed in men's singles and a coach. He was the Japanese champion in 1931 and represented Japan at both the 1932 Winter Olympics and the 1936 Winter Olympics.

== Early life ==
Oimatsu was born on 30 October 1911, in what is now Tonami, Toyama and raised in Osaka after being adopted by a family named Nakamura. His hobbies included photography, art, classical music appreciation, and particularly, writing haiku. He died at age 89 on 24 March 2001.

== Career ==
Oimatsu first ice skated in the second grade of middle school after a friend invited him to go to a rink for fun. At the time, there were very few resources for figure skaters in Japan, and Oimatsu taught himself from a book written by the Russian skater Nikolai Panin. There was only one, very small, artificial rink available for training, and he and other Japanese skaters typically trained on mountain lakes; they also had no coaches available. They used wooden skates based on geta.

He competed in the first edition of the Japan Figure Skating Championships in 1930 with only about one year of experience. The next year, he won the national title.

In 1932, Oimatsu was a member of the first Japanese team of figure skaters to compete at the Olympics in Lake Placid. He placed 9th. The next week, he also competed at the 1932 World Championships and placed 7th. Joel B Liberman, writing for Skating magazine, praised him and the other Japanese skaters for showing very good balance in their spins. While they were in New York for the Olympics, he and Ryuichi Obitani took lessons from Willy Böckl.

He went on to win two more medals at the Japanese championships, silver in 1933 and bronze in 1935. In 1936, he again competed abroad; he placed 15th at the European Championships, 20th at his second Winter Olympics, and then 15th two weeks later at the World Championships.

After World War II, Oimatsu was diagnosed with tuberculosis in 1948 and returned home to recover. By this time, three of the four male Japanese skaters who had gone to the Olympics with him in 1932 and 1936 no longer skated, and the last, Toshikazu Katayama, was reported to skate only occasionally. After he recovered, he turned professional and three years later, he began coaching at the Sports Center ice rink at the recommendation of the Osaka Skating Federation. He particularly enjoyed teaching children from the beginning and seeing their skills develop.

== Competitive highlights ==
Event	1930	1931	1932	1933	1934	1935	1936
Winter Olympics			9th				20th
World Championships			7th				15th
European Championships							9th
Japanese Championships	5th	1st		2nd		3rd	
