= Etsuko Inada =

Japanese figure skater

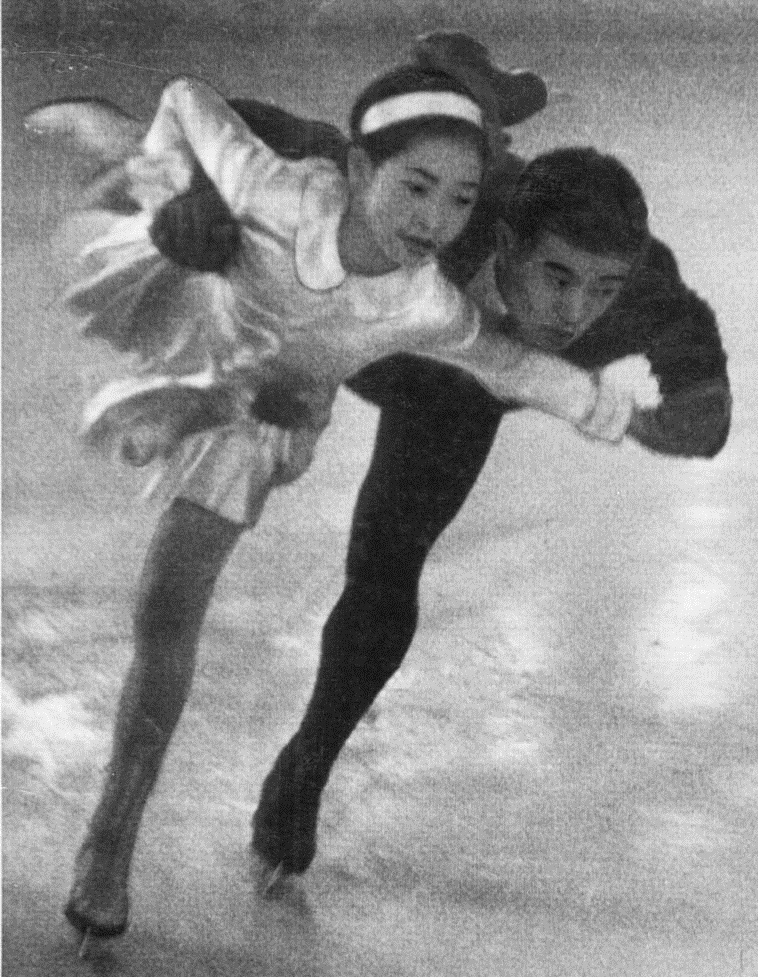
- Inada (left) during an exhibition gala in 1937

Personal information
- Native name: 稲田 悦子
- Born: February 8, 1924 Osaka, Japan
- Died: July 8, 2003 (aged 79) Chiba, Chiba, Japan

Figure skating career
- Country: Japan
- Began skating: 1932
- Retired: 1952

Etsuko Inada (稲田 悦子, Inada Etsuko; Hiragana: いなだ えつこ; February 8, 1924 – July 8, 2003) was a Japanese figure skater who mostly competed in singles. She was the first female athlete to represent Japan at the Winter Olympics.

== Early life ==
Inada was born on February 8, 1924 in Osaka. Her family ran a watch store, and she was the youngest of three sisters.

== Career ==
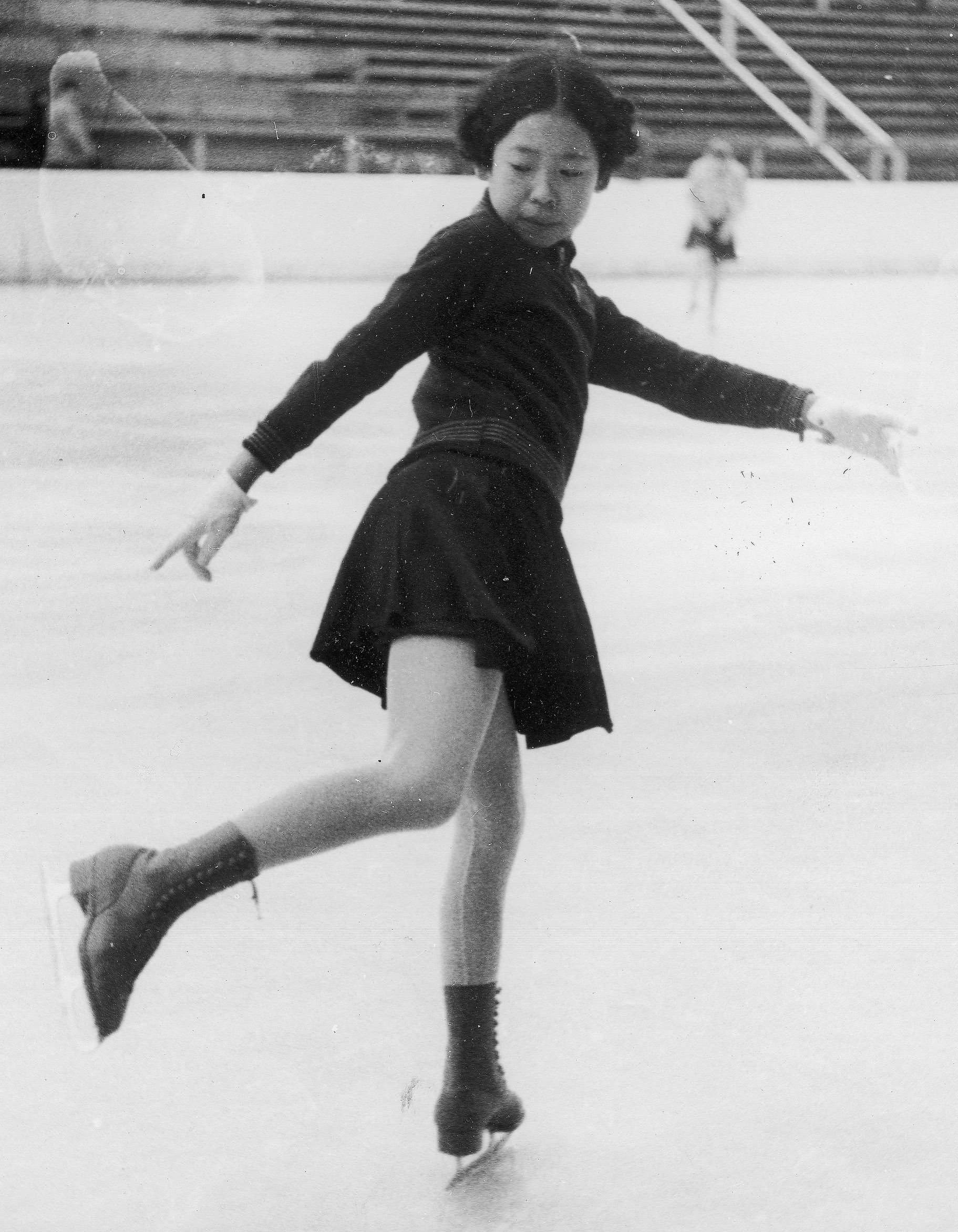
Inada training at the 1936 Winter Olympics

Inada began skating at eight years old after watching an ice show; her two older sisters also began skating for a short time. She was a seven-time Japanese national champion. She won the junior women's division at the Japanese Championships when it was trialed in 1935, then won the first senior women's championships the next season later that year.

Her coach was Kōzō Nagai. Nagai had no experience with skating himself, but he was an enthusiast of the sport and contributed to its spread in Japan.

After competing at the 1936 European Championships, at the age of 12, she was the first female athlete to represent Japan at the 1936 Winter Olympics. While competing there, she wore a costume given to her by the Japanese Women's Association of Berlin. Shortly after, she also competed at the 1936 World Championships and placed 10th. Theresa Weld, writing for Skating magazine, wrote that she was well-liked by the other skaters and that, "She can do almost every thing on both feet, which is most unusual", and she also praised her ability to learn new elements quickly.

Between 1937 and 1941, she won five consecutive Japanese national titles.

In late 1943, she and Tsuyako Yamashita were ordered by Hideki Tojo to be sent to China and skate for injured soldiers. They spent two months there, during which they hid together from gunfire. Yamashita recalled that they treated well by the soldiers and given treats such as yōkan and zōni that were not available in Japan at the time.

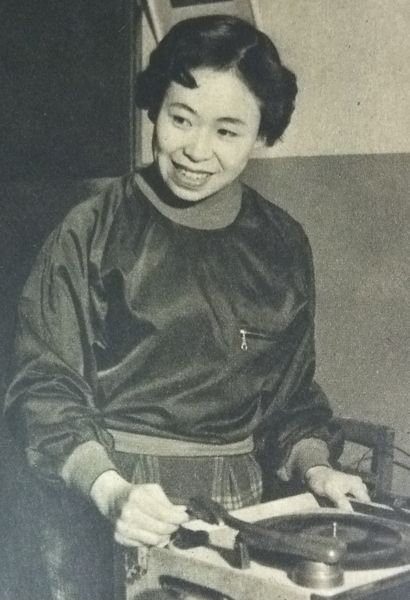
Inada in 1955

After the war, Inada married and had a son. She returned to competitive skating and won a competition shortly before the planned 1949 Japanese national championships, but the national championships were cancelled due to the weather becoming too warm. Her last competition was the 1951 World Figure Skating Championships, where she placed 21st of 23 skaters. In 1952, she turned professional.

Later in her life, she opened a store in Aoyama, Tokyo and coached at a rink in front of the Prince Chichibu Memorial Sports Museum, which holds her costume from the Olympics in its collection. Her students included Olympic skaters Miwa Fukuhara, Junko Hiramatsu, and Haruko Okamoto. She died in 2003 from stomach cancer.

== Competitive highlights ==
International
Event	1933–34	1934–35	1935–36	1936–37	1937–38	1938–39	1939–40	1940–41	1950–51
Olympics			10th						
Worlds			10th						21st
Europeans			9th						
National
Japan		1st		1st	1st	1st	1st	1st	1st
Japan Jr.	1st								
