= Zenjiro Watanabe =

Japanese figure skater (born 1914)

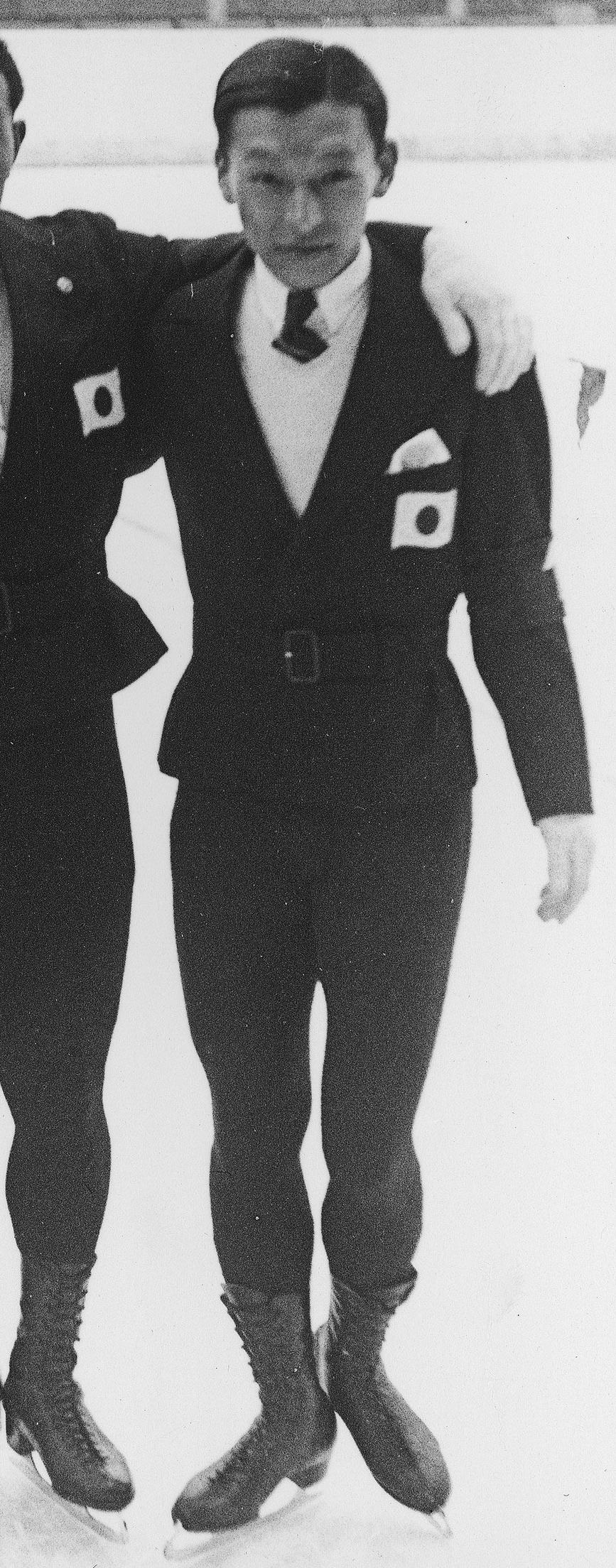

Personal information
- Nationality: Japanese
- Born: 11 February 1914 Tokyo, Japan
- Died: 22 June 1998 (aged 84)

Sport
- Sport: Figure skating

Zenjiro Watanabe (渡辺 善次郎, Watanabe Zenjirō; 11 February 1914 – 22 June 1998) was a Japanese figure skater. He competed in the men's singles event at the 1936 Winter Olympics.
