= Reiko Kobayashi =

Japanese figure skater and coach

Personal information
- Native name: 小川れい子
- Other names: Reiko Ogawa
- Born: January 15, 1961 (age 65)

Figure skating career
- Country: Japan
- Retired: c. 1982

Reiko Ogawa (小川れい子, Ogawa Reiko; born January 15, 1961), née Reiko Kobayashi (小林れい子), is a Japanese figure skating coach and former competitor. She won gold medals at the 1977 Nebelhorn Trophy, 1977 Grand Prix International St. Gervais, and 1980–81 Japan Championships.

Kobayashi has coached Mao Asada, Risa Shoji, and Haruna Suzuki.

== Competitive highlights ==
International
Event	72–73	75–76	76–77	77–78	78–79	79–80	80–81	81–82
Worlds					20th	21st	17th	
NHK Trophy						11th		
Skate Canada								8th
Nebelhorn				1st				
St. Gervais				1st				
National
Japan Champ.	2nd J	3rd	2nd	2nd	2nd	2nd	1st	
J = Junior level
