= Günther Lorenz =

German figure skater

Personal information
- Nationality: German
- Born: 17 September 1915
- Died: 1 February 1999 (aged 83)

Sport
- Sport: Figure skating

Günther Lorenz (17 September 1915 – 1 February 1999) was a German figure skater. He competed in the men's singles event at the 1936 Winter Olympics.
