= Tsugio Hasegawa =

Japanese figure skater

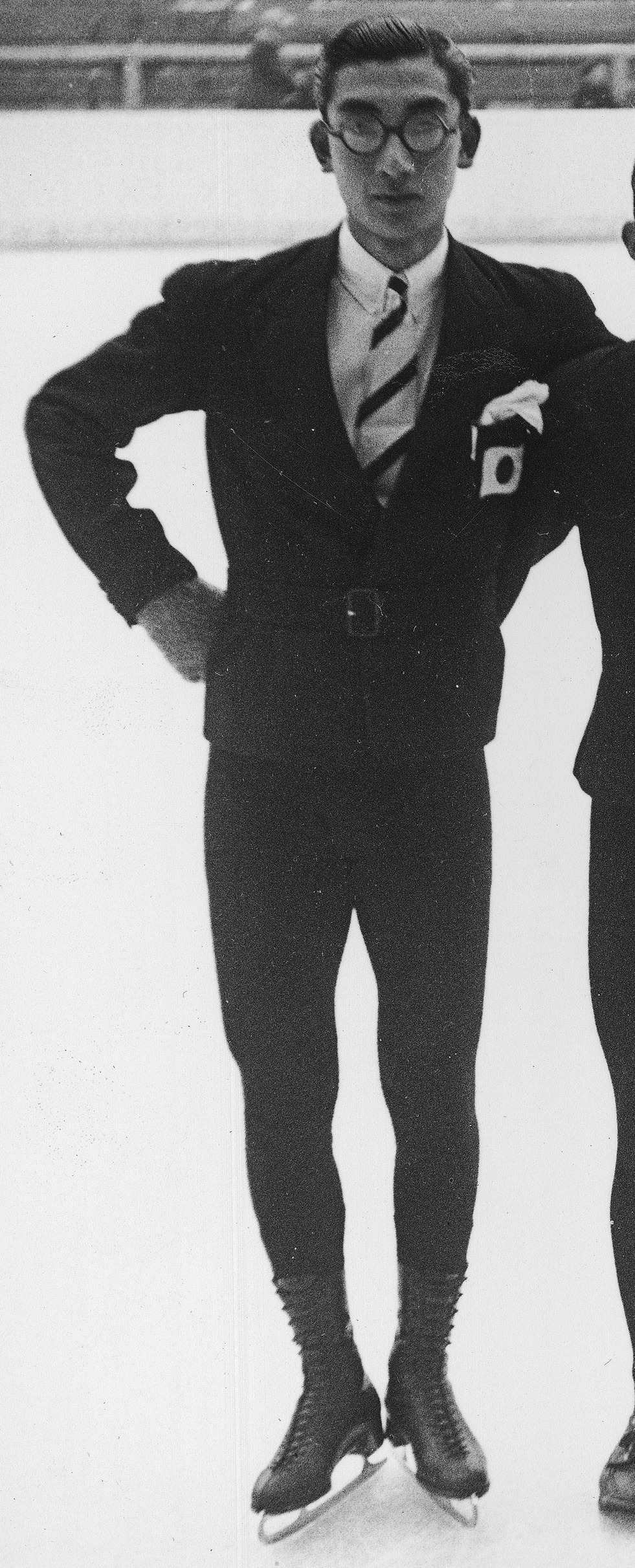
- Hasegawa at the 1936 Winter Olympics

Personal information
- Nationality: Japanese
- Born: 18 June 1913; Tokyo, Japan

Sport
- Sport: Figure skating

Tsugio Hasegawa (長谷川 次男, Hasegawa Tsugio, born 18 June 1913, date of death unknown) was a Japanese figure skater.

Hasegawa began figure skating in 1926 at a park in Kanagawa Prefecture. He competed in the men's singles event at the 1936 Winter Olympics. Later that month, he competed at the 1936 World Championships, where he placed last.
