= Kumiko Sato =

Japanese figure skater and coach

Personal information
- Other names: Kumiko Okawa
- Born: February 22, 1946 (age 80) Osaka, Japan

Figure skating career
- Country: Japan
- Skating club: Kansai University
- Retired: 1968

Kumiko Sato (佐藤 久美子, Satō Kumiko), née Kumiko Okawa (大川 久美子, Ōkawa Kumiko; born February 22, 1946) is a Japanese figure skating coach and former competitor. She is the 1968 Winter Universiade champion and a two-time (1966, 1967) Japan national champion. She represented Japan twice at the Winter Olympics, in 1964 and 1968. Her best finish at the World Championships was 5th, which she obtained in 1967 and 1968.

After retiring from competition, she became one of the more successful coaches in Japan. She is married to Nobuo Sato, with whom she has a daughter, Yuka Sato. As of 2011, the couple live near Yokohama.

== Results ==
International
Event	58–59	59–60	60–61	61–62	62–63	63–64	64–65	65–66	66–67	67–68
Olympics						13th				8th
Worlds						13th	12th	10th	5th	5th
Universiade								2nd		1st
National
Japanese	3rd	3rd	3rd	3rd	3rd	3rd	3rd	2nd	1st	1st
