= Yutaka Higuchi (figure skater) =

Japanese figure skater

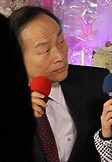
Yuzuru Hanyu and Mao Asada in Yutaka's room at the 2012 NHK Trophy (cropped)

Yutaka Higuchi (樋口 豊, Higuchi Yutaka; born September 20, 1949 in Tokyo, Japan) is a Japanese figure skater who is now a coach and figure skating commentator. He is a three-time Japanese national champion. He placed 25th in the 1968 Winter Olympic Games, and 16th in the 1972 Winter Olympic Games.

== Competitive highlights ==
International
Event	65–66	66–67	67–68	68–69	69–70	70–71	71–72
Winter Olympics			25th				16th
World Championships					20th	20th	15th
Prize of Moscow News							5th
National
Japan Championships	3rd	3rd	2nd		1st	1st	1st

== See also ==
- Figure skating at the 1968 Winter Olympics
- Figure skating at the 1972 Winter Olympics
