= Miwa Fukuhara =

Japanese figure skater

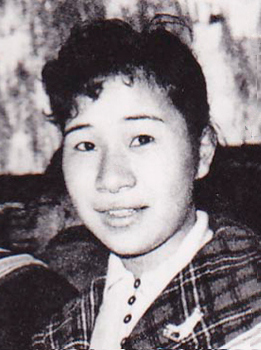
- Miwa Fukuhara at the 1960 Olympics

Personal information
- Native name: 福原 美和
- Born: December 13, 1944 (age 81) Tokyo, Japan
- Height: 1.56 m (5 ft 1 in)

Figure skating career
- Country: Japan
- Retired: 1967

Miwa Fukuhara (福原 美和, Fukuhara Miwa; born December 13, 1944) is a Japanese former competitive figure skater who now works as a coach. She is a two-time Winter Universiade champion and a six-time Japanese national champion. She finished 21st in the 1960 Winter Olympic Games and 5th in the 1964 Winter Olympic Games.

== Competitive career ==
Fukuhara began skating at age 8. She trained under Etsuko Inada.

She won her first medal at the Japan Championships, a bronze, in 1956. The next two years, she won silver, and in 1959, she won her first national title. The next February, she competed at her first Winter Olympics in 1960, where she placed 21st. She also competed at her first World Championships and placed 14th.

The next season, she placed second at the national championships, but she regained her title in 1961. She would go on to win four more consecutive national titles. She placed 9th at the 1962 World Championships and 6th at the 1963 World Championships.

Fukuhara won the Winter Universiade two consecutive times, in 1964 and 1966. She competed at the 1964 Winter Olympics, where she placed 5th. That year, she again placed 6th at the 1964 World Championships, and she did so once more the next year. She placed 8th at the 1966 World Championships.

Fukuhara was training in the United States in March 1966. The next season, she won silver at the Japan Championships. Although she was entered to compete at the 1967 World Championships, she withdrew.

== Coaching career ==
Fukuhara attended Waseda University, where her maternal grandfather was also an alumni.

After retiring from competition, Fukuhara skated in foreign ice shows. She performed in Europe as well as Holiday on Ice in the United States, and she also studied in the United Kingdom.

On returning to Japan, she became a coach. Her students have included Junko Yaginuma, who later coached with her. She encourages her students to take interest in a wide range of music as well as other forms of art.

== Competitive highlights ==
International
Event	56–57	57–58	58–59	59–60	60–61	61–62	62–63	63–64	64–65	65–66	66–67
Olympics				21st				5th			
Worlds				14th		9th	6th	6th	6th	8th	WD
Universiade								1st		1st	
National
Japanese	3rd	2nd	2nd	1st	2nd	1st	1st	1st	1st	1st	2nd
WD = Withdrew
