= Nobuo Satō =

Japanese figure skater and coach

Nobuo Sato
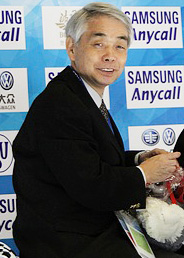
- Sato in 2010

Personal information
- Born: January 3, 1942 (age 84) Osaka, Japan

Figure skating career
- Country: Japan

Japanese name
- Kanji: 佐藤信夫
- Kana: さとう のぶお
Transcriptions
- Romanization: Satō Nobuo

Nobuo Satō (佐藤 信夫, Satō Nobuo; born January 3, 1942 in Osaka) is a Japanese figure skater and coach. He is a ten-time Japanese national champion. He represented Japan at the 1960 Winter Olympics, where he placed 14th, and at the 1964 Winter Olympics, where he placed 8th. His best finish at the World Championships was 4th in 1965.

He is married to Kumiko Okawa, and as of 2011 the couple lives near Yokohama. Their daughter is Yuka Sato, the 1994 World Champion.

Along with Machiko Yamada, he is one of the most successful coaches in Japan. His current and former students include Miki Ando, Mao Asada, Shoko Ishikawa, Hirokazu Kobayashi, Takahiko Kozuka, Yukari Nakano, Yuka Sato, Marin Honda, Kao Miura, Wun-Chang Shih, and Fumie Suguri.

In February 2010, he was elected to the World Figure Skating Hall of Fame.

== Competitive highlights ==
International
Event	55–56	56–57	57–58	58–59	59–60	60–61	61–62	62–63	63–64	64–65	65–66
Olympics					14th				8th		
Worlds					12th		10th	10th	8th	4th	5th
Universiade					2nd				2nd		1st
National
Japan	3rd	1st	1st	1st	1st	1st	1st	1st	1st	1st	1st
