= Figure skating at the 1999 Asian Winter Games – Ice dance =

Ice dance at the 1999 Asian Winter Games
- Venue: Yongpyong Dome
- Dates: 3–5 February 1999
- Competitors: 8 from 3 nations

Medalists
gold medal	Zhang Wei; Wang Rui	China
silver medal	Kenji Miyamoto; Rie Arikawa	Japan
bronze medal	Lee Chuen-gun; Yang Tae-hwa	South Korea

The mixed ice dancing figure skating at the 1999 Asian Winter Games was held on 3, 4 and 5 February 1999 at Yongpyong Indoor Ice Rink, South Korea.

== Schedule ==
All times are Korea Standard Time (UTC+09:00)

Date	Time	Event
Wednesday, 3 February 1999	18:15	Compulsory dance 1
Wednesday, 3 February 1999	18:55	Compulsory dance 2
Thursday, 4 February 1999	17:15	Original dance
Friday, 5 February 1999	16:30	Free dance

== Results ==
Rank	Team	CD1	CD2	OD	FD	Total
1st place, gold medalist(s)	China (CHN); Zhang Wei; Wang Rui	1	1	1	1	2.0
2nd place, silver medalist(s)	Japan (JPN); Kenji Miyamoto; Rie Arikawa	2	2	2	2	4.0
3rd place, bronze medalist(s)	South Korea (KOR); Lee Chuen-gun; Yang Tae-hwa	3	3	4	3	6.6
4	Japan (JPN); Akiyuki Kido; Nozomi Watanabe	4	4	3	4	7.4
