= You Young =

South Korean figure skater (born 2004)

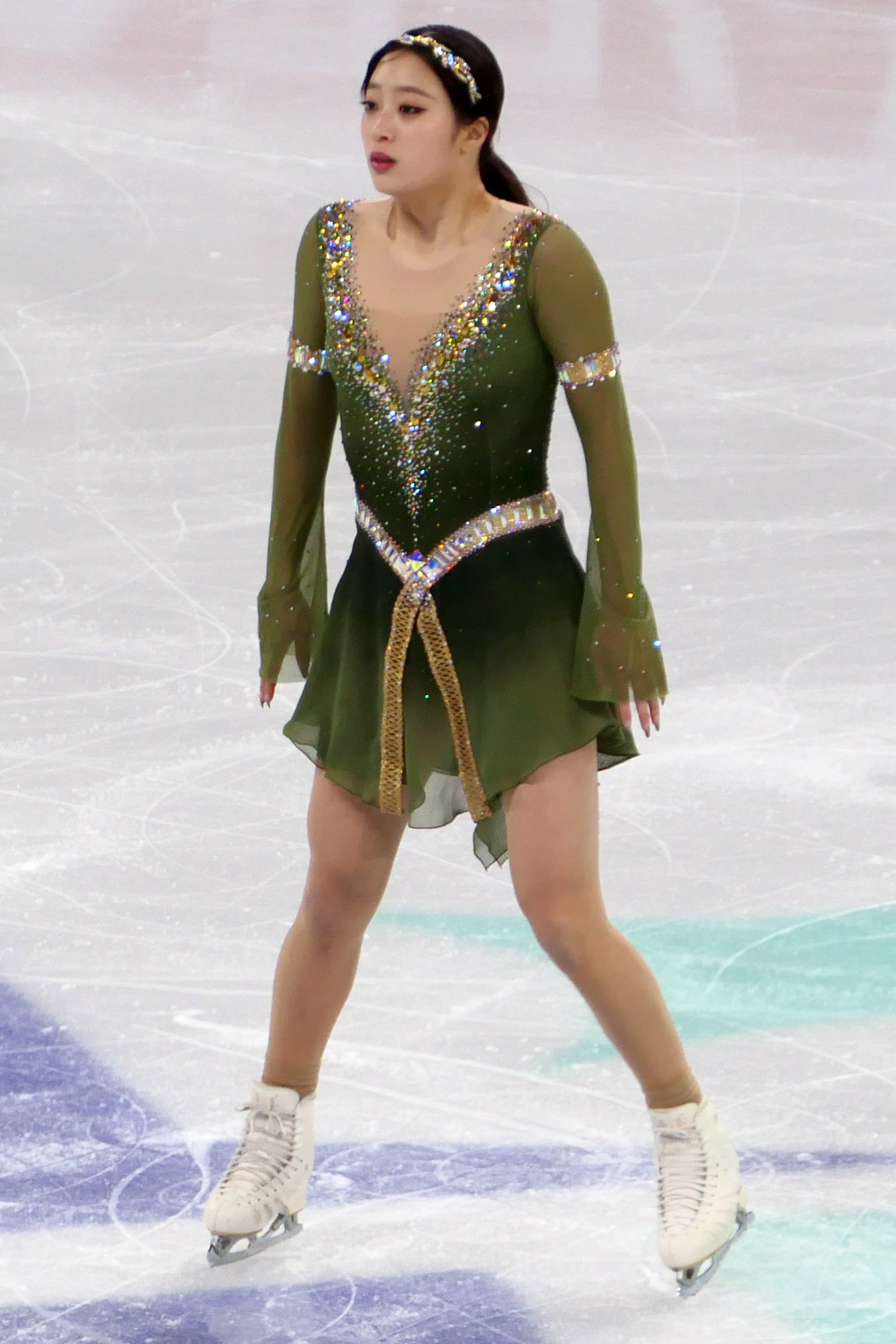
- You during her free skate at the 2024 World Championships

Personal information
- Native name: 유영
- Born: May 27, 2004 (age 22) Seoul, South Korea
- Height: 1.66 m (5 ft 5 in)

Figure skating career
- Country: South Korea
- Coach: Tammy Gambill; Choi Ji-eun
- Skating club: Korean Skating Union
- Began skating: 2010
- Highest WS: 4th (2021–2022)
Medal record
Representing South Korea
Figure skating: Ladies' singles
Four Continents Championships
Silver medal – second place	2020 Seoul	Ladies' Singles
South Korean Championships
Gold medal – first place	2016 Seoul	Ladies' Singles
Gold medal – first place	2018 Seoul	Ladies' Singles
Gold medal – first place	2019 Seoul	Ladies' Singles
Gold medal – first place	2020 Uijeongbu	Ladies' Singles
Gold medal – first place	2022 Uijeongbu	Ladies' Singles
Winter Youth Olympics
Gold medal – first place	2020 Lausanne	Ladies' singles

- You Young
- Hangul: 유영
- Hanja: 劉永
- RR: Yu Yeong
- MR: Yu Yŏng

You Young (Korean: 유영; born May 27, 2004) is a South Korean figure skater. She is the 2020 Four Continents silver medalist, a four-time Grand Prix bronze medalist, a four-time Challenger series medalist, and a five-time South Korean national champion (2016, 2018, 2019, 2020, 2022.)

On the junior level, she is the 2020 Youth Olympic champion, the 2018 JGP Slovakia bronze medalist, and the 2019 Winter Children of Asia International Sports Games champion.

You is the youngest ever national champion of South Korea at age 11 in 2016. She is also the first Korean woman to successfully land a triple Axel in an international competition and the first Asian woman to win the gold medal in Figure skating at the Winter Youth Olympics. She currently holds the fourth highest technical element score in the short program (45.54 at the 2019 Skate Canada) and the ninth highest technical element score in the free skate (79.94 at the 2020 Four Continents). She remains the first female skater to have landed the triple Axel at the Youth Olympics.

Competing in the 2022 Beijing Olympics, You placed 5th overall.

== Personal life ==
You Young is the third child and only daughter of her father, You Il-jin, who ran a business in Indonesia, and mother, Lee Sook-hee. She moved to Indonesia at age two because of her father's business and spent her youth in Singapore. She enrolled in Bukit Timah primary school and attended school for a year before she returned to South Korea.

You's father died in February 2022.

== Career ==
=== Early career ===
You Young began skating after watching Yuna Kim's victory at the 2010 Winter Olympic Games. Though maintaining South Korean nationality, she was raised in Singapore, trained under various coaches, and competed in the Singapore National Figure Skating Championships from 2011 to 2013.

One of her coaches was Singapore-based Zhang Wei, a former Chinese national ice dancer who won gold with partner Wang Rui at the 1999 Asian Winter Games, who she trained with for six months in 2012. Zhang said her talent was evident even then and told TODAY: "She's not the most talented athlete I've coached. But her jumps, explosive energy, flexibility and coordination were very good then, and it is very rare that you get all these qualities in one athlete, particularly at that age." He is confident that You has what it takes to become a future world and Olympic champion. On his advice, You returned to South Korea with her mother in March 2013 to further her development as the training environment is better.

=== 2015–2016 season: National title ===
In January 2016, You Young won the gold medal at the 2016 South Korean Figure Skating Championships, becoming the youngest-ever national champion of South Korea at age 11, surpassing the previous record set by Yuna Kim who won at age 12 in 2003.

In March, You won the gold medal at the novice level of the Cup of Tyrol.

=== 2016–2017 season ===
In November 2016, You won the silver medal at the novice level of the Tallinn Trophy behind Alena Kanysheva of Russia.

In January 2017, she finished fifth at the 2017 South Korean Figure Skating Championships mainly because of a fall in the short program.

=== 2017–2018 season: Junior international debut ===
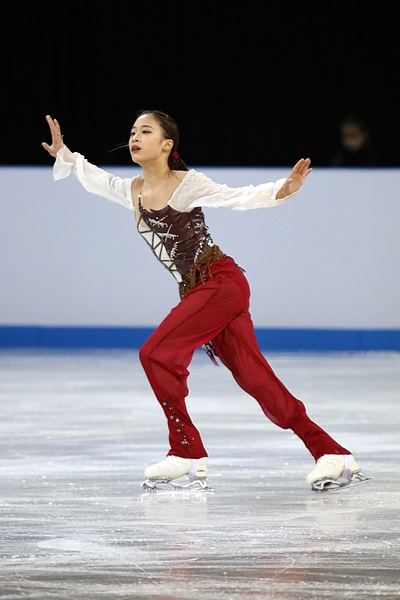
You at the 2018 World Junior Championships

You debuted on the Junior Grand Prix (JGP) series in September 2018, placing fourth at JGP Croatia in Zagreb. In October, she placed fifth at JGP Italy in Egna.

In January 2018, she won the gold medal at the 2018 South Korean Figure Skating Championships, earning her second national title.

In March, You finished ninth at the 2018 World Junior Championships.

=== 2018–2019 season: Third national title ===
In August 2018, You began competing on the JGP series, winning the bronze medal at JGP Slovakia in Bratislava, behind Russians Anna Shcherbakova and Anna Tarusina. It is currently her first and only JGP medal. She then placed fourth at JGP Canada in Richmond, British Columbia, Canada.

After earning her third national title, You was assigned to the 2019 World Junior Championships. In February 2019, she won gold at the 2019 Bavarian Open and the 2019 Winter Children of Asia ISG. After a poor short program at Junior Worlds that left her in eleventh place, You rose to sixth place overall with a stronger free skate.

=== 2019–2020 season: Senior international debut ===
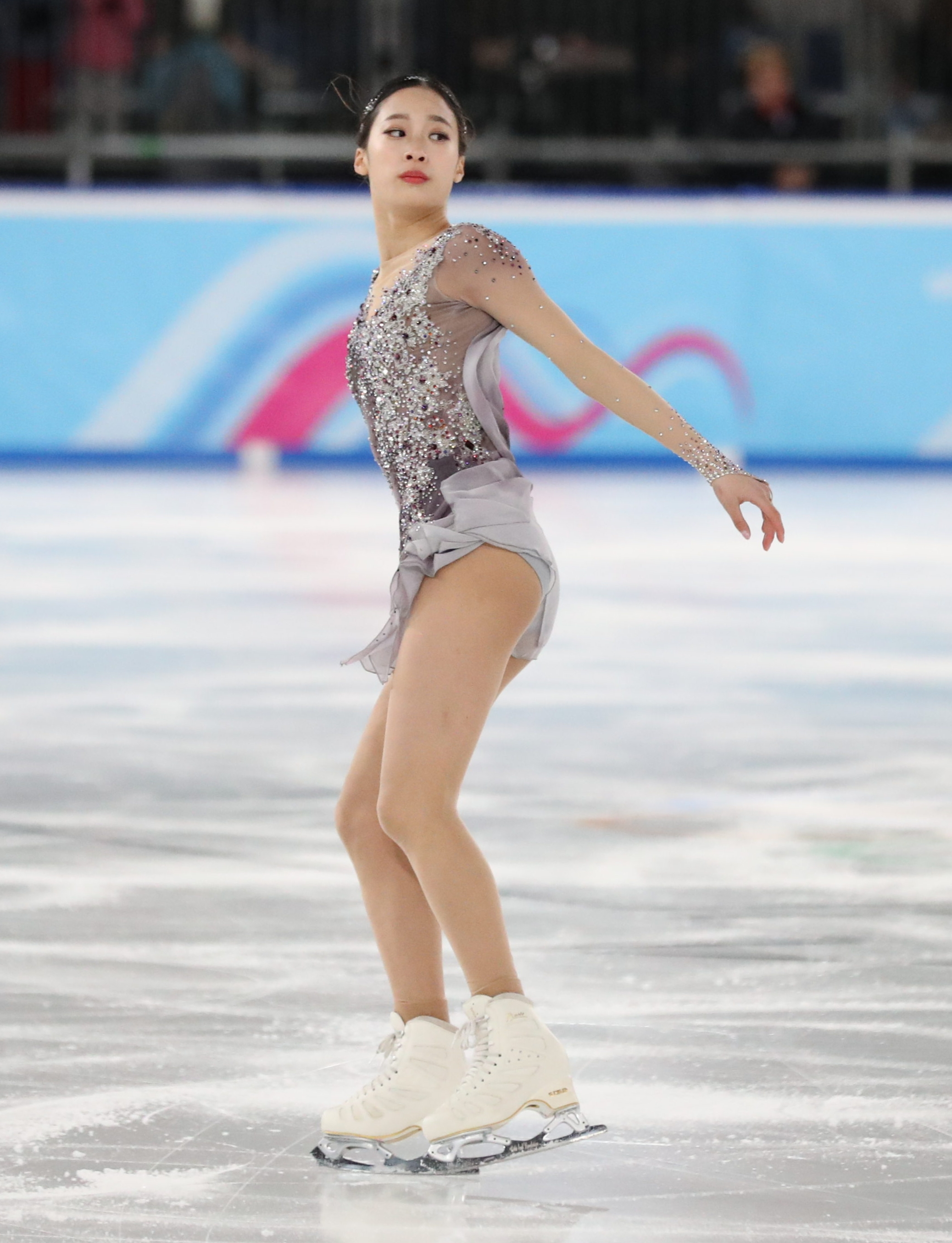
You performing her short program at the 2020 Winter Youth Olympics

You opened her season at the 2019 Philadelphia Summer International, where she won the gold medal. You debuted on the Challenger series, winning the bronze medal at the 2019 CS Lombardia Trophy behind Russians Anna Shcherbakova and Elizaveta Tuktamysheva after she placed second in the short program and third in the free program. At this competition, she scored over 70 points in the short program, 130 points in the free skate, and 200 points overall for the first time in an ISU-sanctioned competition. One week later, You won the silver medal at another Challenger, the 2019 CS U.S. Classic, winning the free skate by scoring over 140 points for the first time. During this period, it was reported that You made a coaching change, with Mie Hamada becoming her primary coach along with Tammy Gambill.

Making her senior Grand Prix debut at the 2019 Skate Canada International, You successfully landed a ratified triple Axel in the short program to place second behind new training mate Rika Kihira of Japan with a new personal best score (78.22). She noted that this was a moment she had been working toward for three years. In the free skate, she fell on another triple Axel attempt and placed fourth in the segment. Overall, her total score of 217.49 was enough for the bronze medal, after Alexandra Trusova and Kihira. You's success at Skate Canada led to her being given a second Grand Prix assignment, the 2019 Cup of China, where she placed fourth after mistakes in both programs.

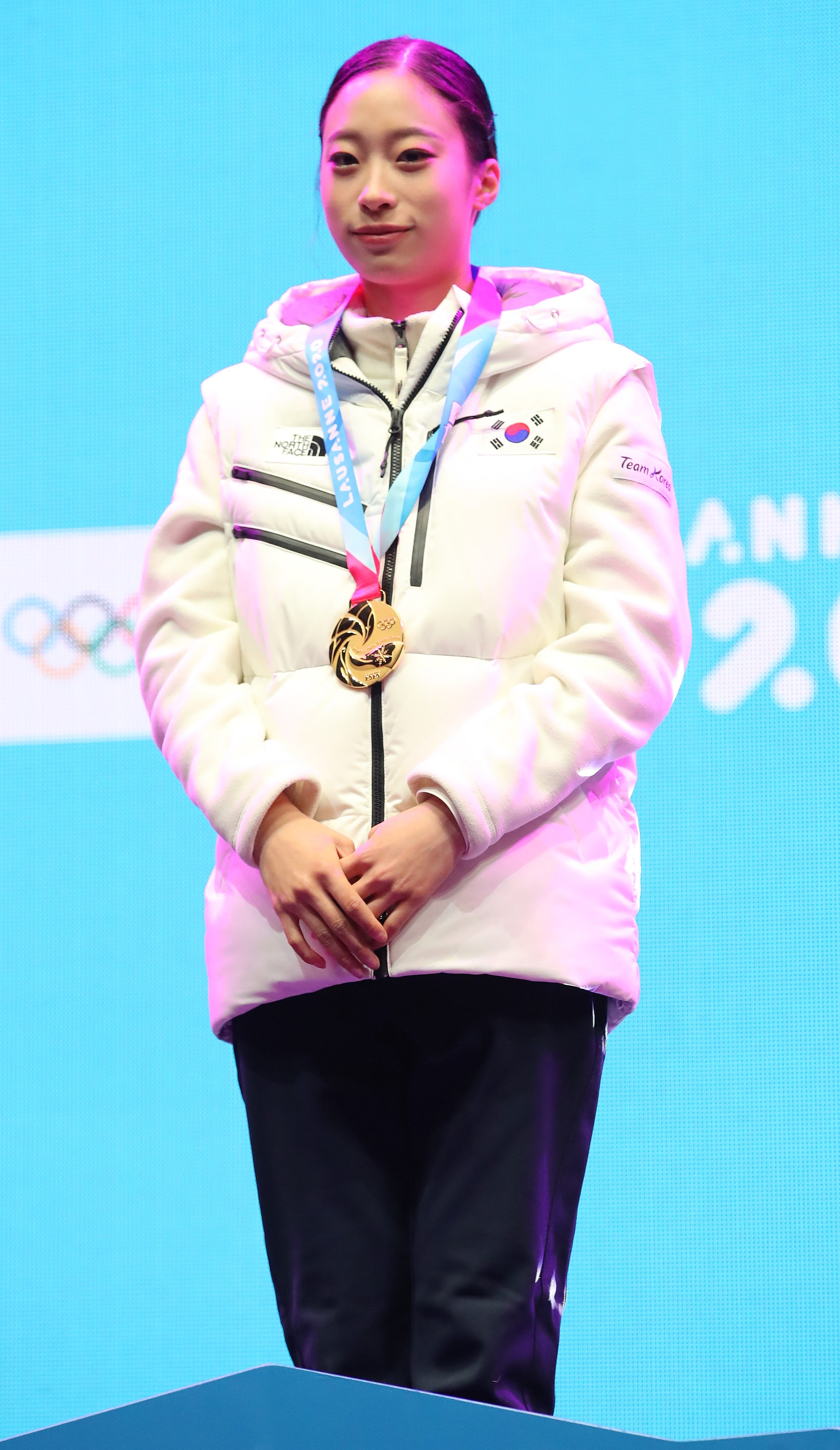
You at the 2020 Winter Youth Olympics

You entered the 2020 South Korean Championships as the defending champion and, given her success on the international circuit, was favored to repeat her title. After placing first in both segments, she won the gold medal ahead of Lee Hae-in and Kim Ye-lim. She was assigned to the Korean teams for the 2020 World Championships along with Kim, and the 2020 Four Continents Championships with Kim and Lim Eun-soo.

Two weeks later, at the 2020 Youth Olympics in Lausanne, she placed first in the short program, a little less than 2 points ahead of Ksenia Sinitsyna of Russia. Because of the different competition requirements at the junior level, she did not attempt a triple Axel in the short program. She then won the free skate by over 12 points and won the title overall, landing eight clean triples in the free skate for the first time, including a triple Axel and two triple Lutz combinations. By doing so, she ended Russia's winning streak in girls' singles at the Winter Youth Olympics, which included previous champions Elizaveta Tuktamysheva (2012) and Polina Tsurskaya (2016).

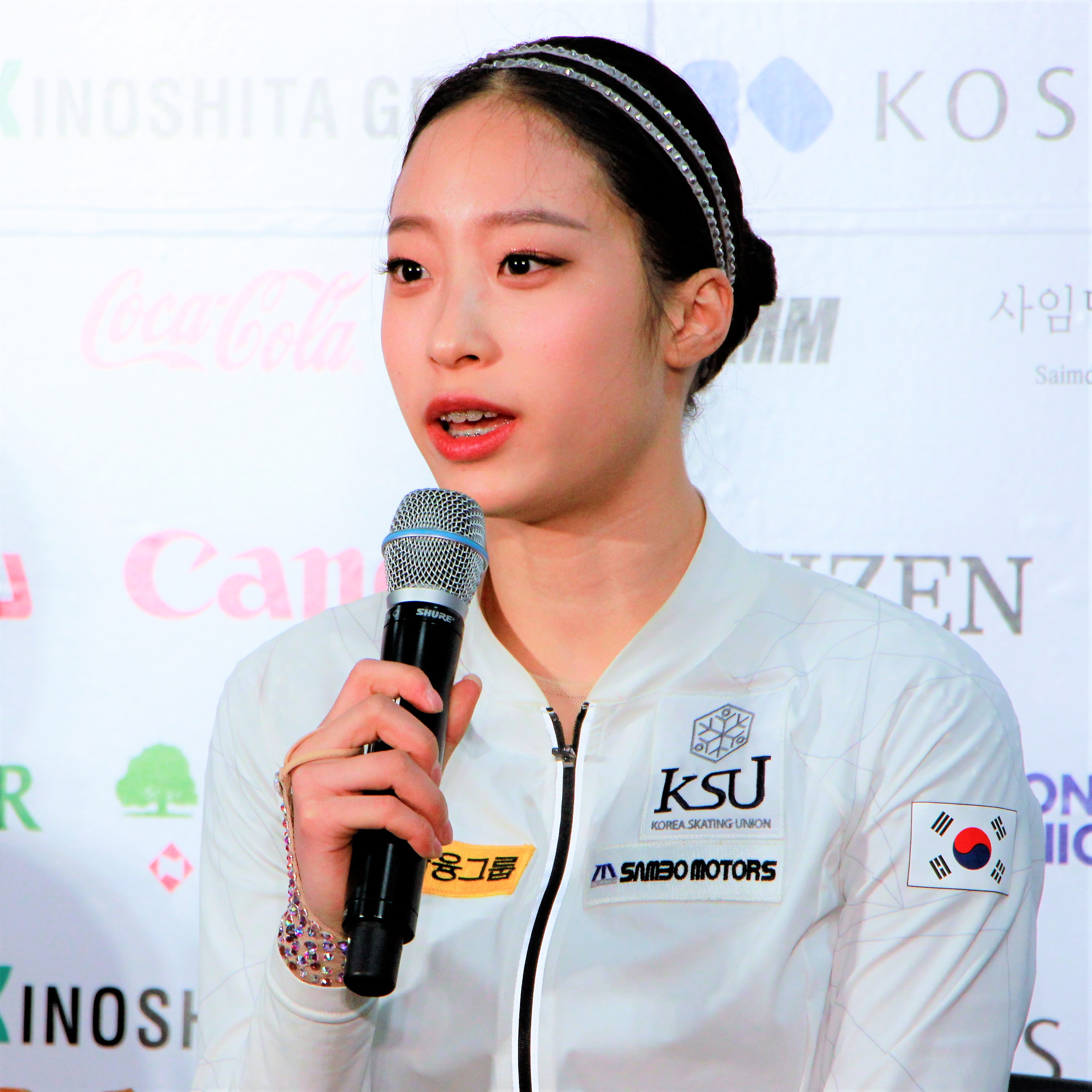
You during a press conference at the 2020 Four Continents Championships

In February, You returned to the senior level for the 2020 Four Continents Championships. She placed third in the short program behind Rika Kihira and Bradie Tennell after a mistake on her triple Axel and an unclear edge call on her triple flip. In the free skate, she delivered a strong performance to place second in the segment with a new personal best score (149.68). She landed all jumps cleanly, with the exception of one under rotation on her triple flip. Her combined total (223.23) was also a personal best, and she moved up to narrowly take the silver medal behind Kihira (232.34) and ahead of Tennell (222.97). This competition was the first time she landed all twelve triple jumps possible under the Zayak rule. She expressed satisfaction with her performance overall, for landing the triple Axel, and for overcoming the pressure of performing for a home crowd, remarking that she became the first Korean skater to medal at Four Continents since Olympic Champion Yuna Kim won the event in 2009. She was assigned to make her senior World Championship debut in Montreal, but these were cancelled as a result of the coronavirus pandemic.

=== 2020–2021 season ===
With the pandemic continuing to affect international travel, the ISU opted to assign the Grand Prix based primarily on geographic location. You was initially without a Grand Prix assignment but was subsequently added to the 2020 NHK Trophy roster once it was clear she could travel to Japan. She was the lone non-Japanese entrant at the NHK Trophy and the only South Korean skater to compete on the Grand Prix that season. Generally considered one of the frontrunners at the event, she had a poor showing in the short program, falling twice and underrotating three of her four triple jumps. As a result, she placed twelfth of twelve skaters in the segment. She called it "a really weird performance" and attributed it to a failure of nerves. You placed fifth in the free skate, landing the triple Axel this time, and rose to seventh place overall.

In February, You competed at the 2021 South Korean Championships. She placed narrowly first in the short program despite under-rotation calls but fell twice in the free skate, including on her triple Axel attempt, and dropped to fourth place overall. As a result, she was not named to Korea's team for the 2021 World Championships.

=== 2021–2022 season: Beijing Olympics ===
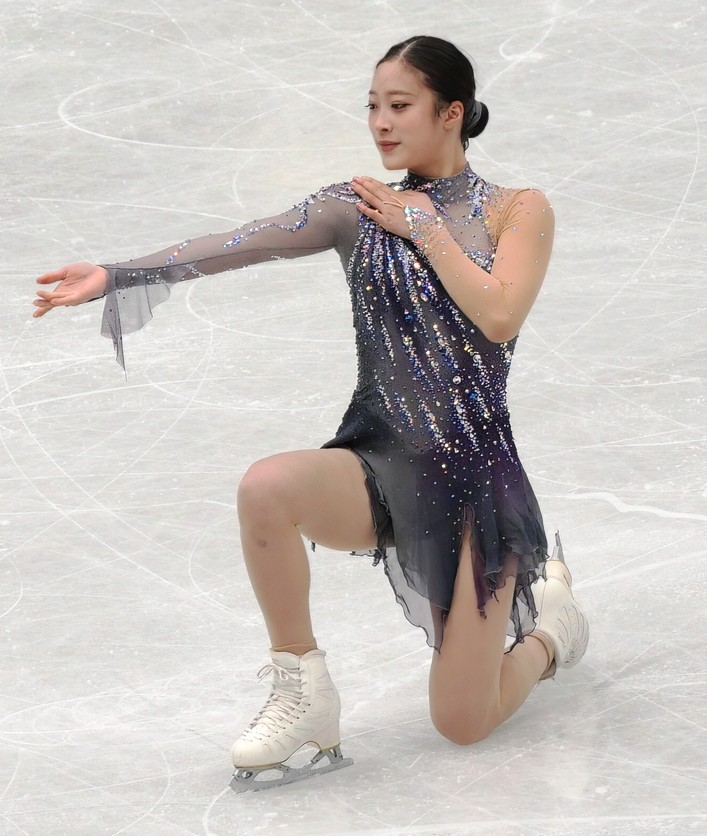
You performing her short program at the 2022 World Championships

You began the season at the Skating Club of Boston's Cranberry Cup event, where she won the silver medal, 30 points behind champion Alysa Liu. She next went on the Challenger series to compete at the 2021 CS Autumn Classic International, where she was considered by many to be the gold medal favourite but ultimately took silver behind surprise winner Marilena Kitromilis of Cyprus. She did not land a clean triple Axel at either event.

Beginning the Grand Prix at the 2021 Skate America, You placed fifth in the short program after falling on her triple Axel attempt. She landed her opening triple Axel in the free skate, albeit deemed a quarter short on rotation, and placed second in that segment despite a few other minor jump issues. She finished with the bronze medal overall, 0.34 behind silver medalist Daria Usacheva. At her second event, the 2021 NHK Trophy, You failed to land her triple Axel in either segment, but still placed third in the short program and second in the free skate to take her second bronze medal of the Grand Prix season. She said afterwards that her goal for the season was "to just get to nationals with no injuries and take care of my body and, if I will do well, make it to the Olympics."

You entered the 2022 South Korean Championships as the title favourite and placed first in both segments to win the gold medal. Her margin over the silver medalist Kim Ye-lim was 13.85 points. She and Kim were named to the South Korean Olympic team, and sent to compete at the 2022 Four Continents Championships alongside bronze medalist Lee Hae-in. You struggled at the event in Tallinn, botching the triple Axel attempt in both segments and finishing sixth overall, behind both Lee and Kim.

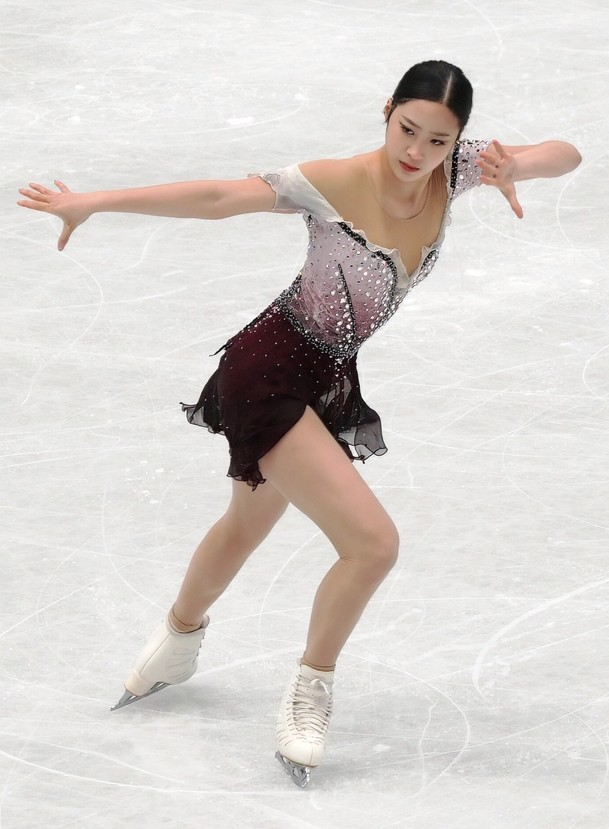
You performing her free program at the 2022 World Championships

Competing at the 2022 Winter Olympics in Beijing, You started the women's event sixth in the short program, having her triple Axel downgraded and receiving an edge call on her flip. In her view, "things were not perfectly done, but I think overall it's good." You placed fourth in the free skate despite underrotating her triple Axel but remained in sixth overall. She later revealed that her father had died while she was competing at these Olympics and, as a result, declined the invitation to skate in the Olympic Gala.

Shortly after the Olympics concluded, the International Skating Union banned all Russian and Belarusian athletes from competing at the 2022 World Championships due to the Russian invasion of Ukraine. This had a major impact on the women's field, which had been dominated by Russians for most of the preceding eight years, and You entered the championships as a serious podium contender. She opted not to attempt a triple Axel in the short program due to feeling uncertainty about it on the morning of, and performed a clean double Axel instead, albeit receiving quarter under rotation calls on two of her triple jumps. She finished fourth in the segment, 0.47 points behind third-place Mariah Bell of the United States. In the free skate, You underrotated some jumps, including her opening triple Axel, singled a planned triple loop, and fell on a triple flip attempt. She dropped to fifth overall.

=== 2022–2023 season ===
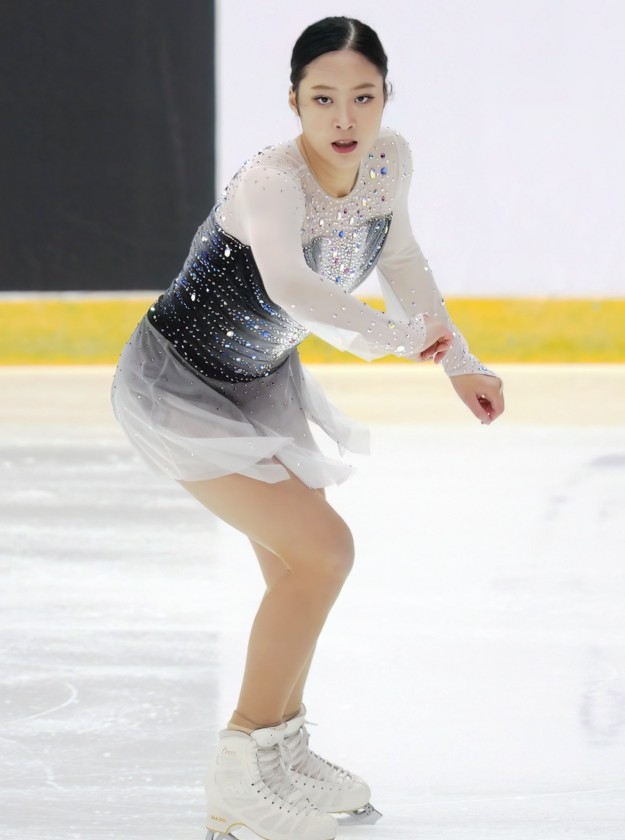
You during her free skate at the 2022 MK John Wilson Trophy

You began her season by winning a silver medal at the 2022 U.S. Classic behind teammate Kim Ye-lim. On the Grand Prix, she entered the 2022 Skate Canada International as one of the title favourites in the women's event, placing fourth in the short program after performing only a triple-double jump combination. She underrotated three jumps in the free skate, also placing fourth in that segment, but won the bronze medal. She said afterward, "I didn't expect a medal today because my competition was not as good as usual. When the coach told me I was third, I was really surprised, and I am thankful to the crowd that they cheer me up even though the performance was not the best."

During her second Grand Prix event, 2022 MK John Wilson Trophy, You came down with a high fever and considered withdrawing from the competition. Deciding to compete but not fully recovered, You placed sixth in the short program after performing a triple-double combination rather than a scheduled triple-triple. She managed to skate a solid free program, however, placing third in that segment of the competition after completing six clean triple jumps and moving up to fourth-place overall. For her exhibition program at the event, she skated to "Like My Father" by Jax, which was dedicated to her father, who had passed earlier that year.

In January, during the 2023 South Korean Championships, You suffered a back injury and finished the competition in eleventh-place after placing ninth in the short program but fifteenth in the free skate. Due to this result, Young was not named to the 2023 World Team but was assigned to compete at the 2023 International Challenge Cup.

At the 2023 Challenge Cup, You placed thirteenth in the short program after falling on a planned triple flip and failing to perform a jump combination. However, she managed to skate a clean free skate that included five triple jumps, placing fifth in that segment of the competition and moving up to sixth-place overall.

In April, You ended collaborations with two of her coaches, Hamada and Pfeifer, and listed Chi has her primary coach.

=== 2023–2024 season ===
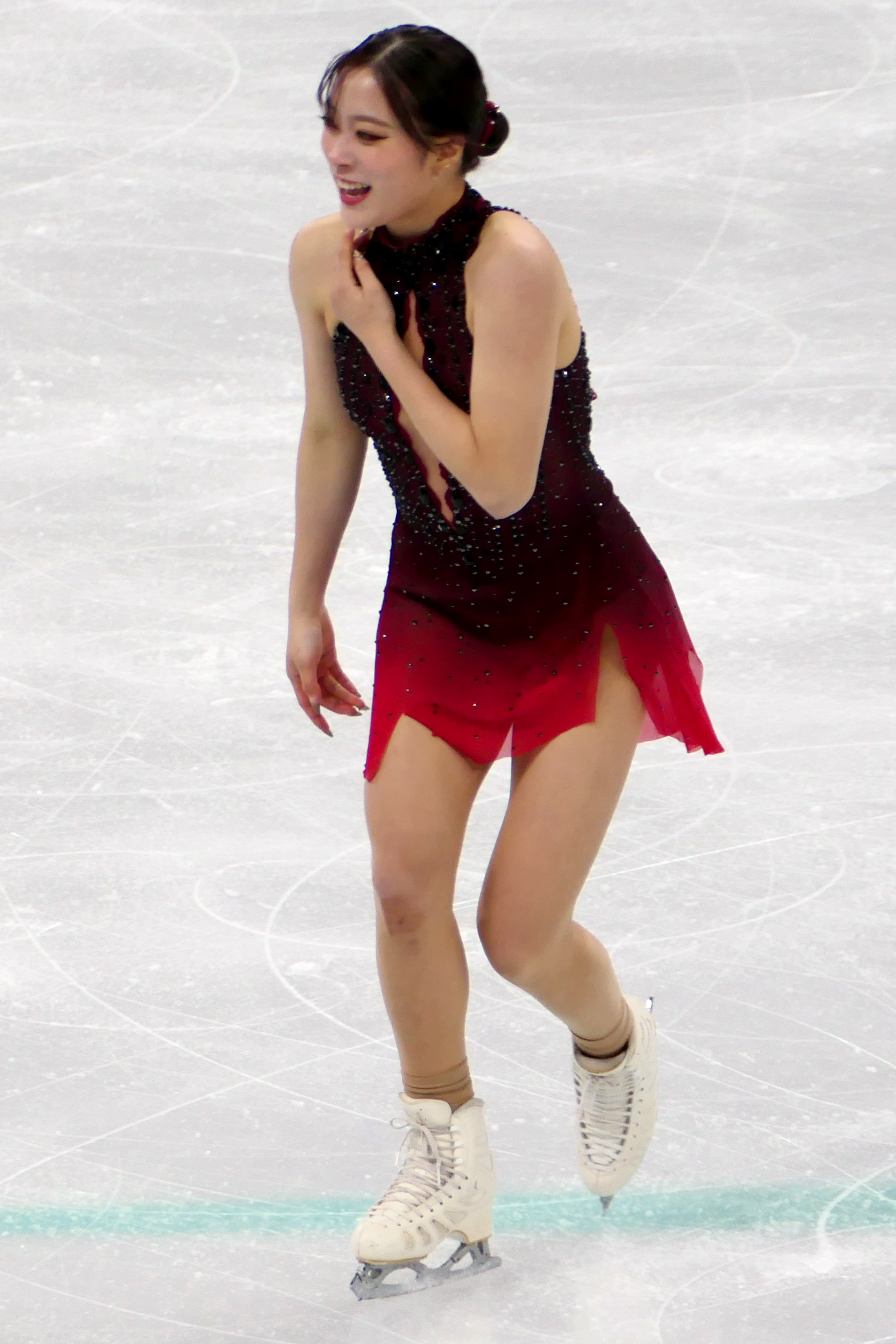
You performing her short program at the 2024 World Championships

You finished fifth at the 2023 CS Nepela Memorial to begin the season. Appearing on the 2023-24 ISU Grand Prix of Figure Skating, she was eleventh of twelve skaters at the 2023 Skate America. At her second assignment, the 2023 Grand Prix of Espoo, You placed eighth. She said afterward that she and her new coaches would be working to improve her jumps and stamina, and expressed thanks to "my fans that they are waiting for me to come back and are giving me all the time I need!" In mid-November, it was announced that You had made a coaching change, returning to childhood coach, Shin Hea-sook.

She would go on to finish eighth at the national ranking competition and seventh at the 2024 South Korean Championships.

You's championship result earned her a berth on the Korean team for the 2024 World Championships in Montreal, where she came fifth in the short program, her strongest result of the season. The free skate proved more difficult, and errors dropped her to twelfth overall. You reflected that it "was a little difficult and tiring at the beginning of the season, but I would like to praise myself for holding on until the end." She vowed to focus on fully recovering from an ankle injury before preparing for the next season. In an April interview, she talked about her season and plans going into 2024-25 "injury free."

=== 2024–2025 season: Suspension ===
In June 2024, You received a one-year suspension from the South Korean national team for both drinking alcohol with teammate, Lee Hae-in, and for allegedly taking illicit photographs of her teammate Lee Hae-in and sending them to Lee's underaged boyfriend without her consent during an overseas training camp held in Varese, Italy, from May 15–28, 2024. As a result, You missed the entirety of the 2024–25 figure skating season. Having initially been assigned to compete at 2024 Skate America and 2024 Finlandia Trophy, her name was later withdrawn from both events.

On June 27, You Young admitted to drinking alcohol, just like Lee Hae-in, but actively denied the sexual harassment allegations and publicly stated her intention to rectify the situation through a retrial. In particular, an official claimed that while it is true You Young took a photo of Lee, the situation was not one that would cause sexual discomfort, and the photo was never shown to male player. Furthermore, the official stated that although You Young testified during the federation's investigation that she had never shown the photo to anyone, it appears the Korea Skating Federation misunderstood the facts during the verification process.

On August 30, after deliberation, the Sports Ethics Committee upheld You Young's one-year suspension. It is reported that Lee Hae-in submitted a petition to the committee stating that she does not wish for You Young to be punished.

On March 26, the Seoul Eastern District Court granted You Young’s application for an injunction to suspend the effect of her disciplinary action. The court ruled that “it is difficult to conclude that the act of photographing Lee Hae-in’s body caused sexual humiliation or disgust,” and that “there is no evidence to support the claim that You Young showed or distributed Lee Hae-in’s photos to male athletes.” As a result, You Young has regained her athlete status and will be able to compete in the 2026 Milan-Cortina d'Ampezzo Winter Olympics qualifying trials.

Speaking out about her suspension period, You shared, "I was anxiously waiting for the court's decision. The moment I heard the news of the ruling, I was very grateful. Most importantly, I felt relieved at the fact that I could compete as an athlete again. I was also happy that I could challenge myself again on the stage I dreamed of... After struggling to return to the national team following the 2022 Beijing Olympics, it was extremely painful to be unable to compete as an athlete due to the suspension. Sponsorship support also came to a halt, and I managed to get by doing various part-time jobs. I think I was able to keep going thanks to the fans' support." Lee Hae-in’s petition stating that she had not been sexually harassed played a decisive role in the court ruling in You Young’s favor. Additionally, it is reported that Lee submitted a petition to the court stating that she did not wish for You Young to be punished. In a lengthy petition, she argued, “It is unfair for You Young to lose the opportunity to compete in the Olympics due to misunderstandings based on facts, and this will set a wrong precedent for all athletes.” She also introduced her legal representative, Attorney Kim Ga-ram, to You Young. You stated, “I am truly grateful to Lee Hae-in."

The Korea Skating Federation maintained its stance that the disciplinary actions against Lee Hae-in and You Young were justified even after the application for an injunction to suspend the effect of the disciplinary action was granted; however, the atmosphere changed following the inauguration of Lee Soo-kyung as the Federation's president. May 13, 2025, attorney Kim Ga-ram, Lee Hae-in's representative, explained, "With the election of a new president, discussions were held to resolve the matter amicably. The Korea Skating Federation accepted the results of the injunction case and agreed to the settlement proposal, taking into account the fact that both Lee Hae-in and You Young had already been suspended for more than four months and had shown great remorse." The Korea Skating Federation, which changed its stance after the election of a new president, has set a precedent by overturning its own decision through mediation.

=== 2025–2026 season ===
In October, it was announced that You had returned to former coach, Tammy Gambill and in addition, had added Choi Ji-eun to her coaching team. She opened the season by competing on the 2025–26 Grand Prix series, finishing ninth at the 2025 Grand Prix de France. A couple weeks later, at the 2025 NHK Trophy, You placed third in the short program and fourth in the free skate, finishing in fourth place overall, only 0.15 points behind bronze medalist, Loena Hendrickx.

In January, You competed at the 2026 South Korean Championships, where she finished in eighth place.

=== 2026–2027 season ===
For the 2026–27 ISU Grand Prix of Figure Skating, You was assigned to 2026 NHK Trophy initially. After the withdrawal of Lorine Schild, she was assigned to 2026 Skate America. You started the competitive season off by winning the selection competition for the 2027 Changchun Winter Universiade.

In November, she competed at the 2026 Skate America in Everett where in the short program, she singled out her intended triple Flip placing eighth. In the free progam she had a mistake on her triple Lutz triple Toe combination and an under rotation on her triple Flip in the sequence placing sixth in the free skate and seventh overall.

== Programs ==
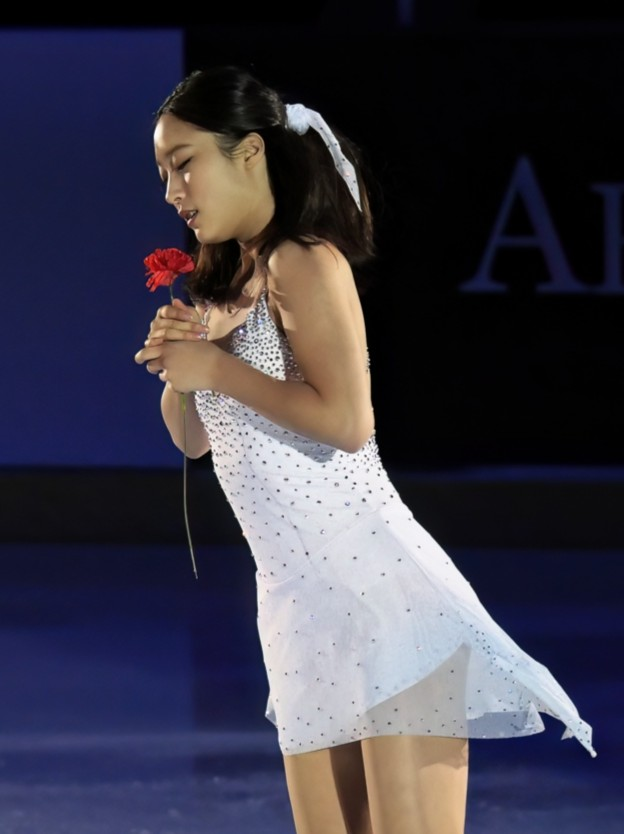
You during her exhibition program at the 2022 MK John Wilson Trophy

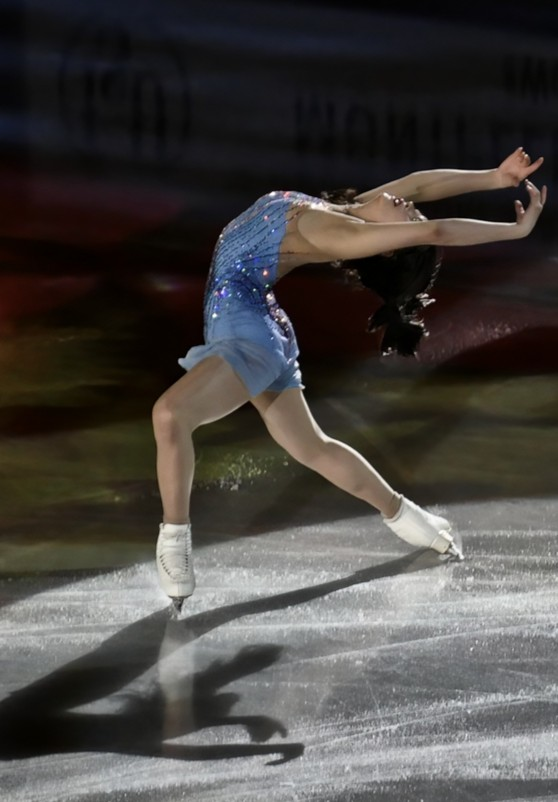
You performing an Ina Bauer during the gala at the 2022 World Championships

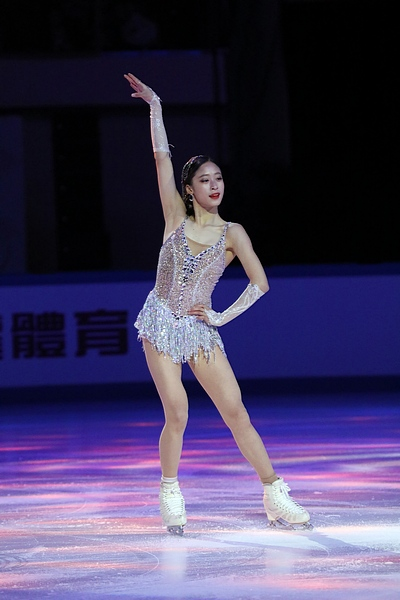
You performing her exhibition program at the 2019 Cup of China

Season	Short program	Free skating	Exhibition
2026–2027	Schindler’s List by John Williams choreo. by Rebeka Kim	Dangerous; Earth Song; Beat it by Michael Jackson choreo. by Rebeka Kim	
2025–2026	Mosaic by Billy Esteban, Ghenwa Nemnom, and Cafe de Anatolia choreo. by Misha Ge	Autumn Moon; True Love's Last Kiss; Yearning Hearts by Eternal Eclipse choreo. by Drew Meekins; Titanic Suite (from Titanic) by James Horner choreo. by You Young	My Love Mine All Mine by Mitski
2024–2025	Did not compete this season		
2023–2024	Otono Porteno by Astor Piazzolla choreo. by Shae-Lynn Bourne; Listen To Your Heart by Roxette performed by Cinematic Pop and Cosette Smith choreo. by Shin Yea-ji	Lord of the Rings by Howard Shore performed by The Piano Guys; May It Be (from The Fellowship of the Ring) by Enya and Roma Ryan choreo. by Lori Nichol; Autumn Moon; True Love's Last Kiss; Yearning Hearts by Eternal Eclipse choreo. by Drew Meekins	
2022–2023	Otono Porteno by Astor Piazzolla choreo. by Shae-Lynn Bourne	Look Down; I Dreamed a Dream; Do You Hear the People Sing? (from Les Misérables) by Claude-Michel Schönberg & Herbert Kretzmer choreo. by Shae-Lynn Bourne; The Four Seasons by Antonio Vivaldi arranged by Max Richter choreo. by Tom Dickson	Like My Father by Jax; When We Were Young by Adele
2021–2022	The Leftovers: Main Title by Max Richter; Whirling Winds by Ludovico Einaudi choreo. by Tom Dickson	Look Down; I Dreamed a Dream; Do You Hear the People Sing? (from Les Misérables) by Claude-Michel Schönberg & Herbert Kretzmer choreo. by Shae-Lynn Bourne	When We Were Young by Adele; Spring Day; Butter (holiday remix); Boy with Luv feat. Halsey by BTS
2020–2021	Istanbul Grooves by Yaşar Akpençe; Asterix & Obelix: Mission Cleopatra by Philippe Chany choreo. by Shin Yea-ji	Lord of the Rings by Howard Shore performed by The Piano Guys; May It Be (from The Fellowship of the Ring) by Enya and Roma Ryan choreo. by Lori Nichol	I Put a Spell on You performed by Annie Lennox
2019–2020	O Verona; Slow Movement; Morning (from Romeo + Juliet) by Nellee Hooper, Craig Armstrong, Marius de Vries choreo. by Tom Dickson	You Must Love Me; Buenos Aires; Don't Cry for Me Argentina (from Evita) performed by Madonna choreo. by Shae-Lynn Bourne	Roxie performed by Renée Zellweger; Overture / All That Jazz performed by Catherine Zeta-Jones (from Chicago) choreo. by Catarina Lindgren; I Can Hear the Bells; You Can't Stop the Beat (from Hairspray)
2018–2019	Tango de Amor (from The Addams Family) by Andrew Lippa choreo. by Shae-Lynn Bourne	Hoist the Colours; Up Is Down; Guilty of Being Innocent of Being Jack Sparrow; Dead Man's Chest: Davy Jones; One Day; He's a Pirate (from Pirates of the Caribbean) by Hans Zimmer & Klaus Badelt choreo. by Shae-Lynn Bourne; Overture by Frederick Loewe; I Could Have Danced All Night by Frederick Loewe, Alan Jay Lerner performed by Marni Nixon (from My Fair Lady) choreo. by Marina Zueva	Roxie performed by Renée Zellweger; Overture / All That Jazz performed by Catherine Zeta-Jones (from Chicago) choreo. by Catarina Lindgren
2017–2018	Don't Rain on My Parade by Jule Styne, Bob Merrill choreo. by Shae-Lynn Bourne	Hoist the Colours; Up Is Down; Guilty of Being Innocent of Being Jack Sparrow; Dead Man's Chest: Davy Jones; One Day; He's a Pirate (from Pirates of the Caribbean) by Hans Zimmer & Klaus Badelt choreo. by Shae-Lynn Bourne	Chicago (soundtrack) choreo. by Catarina Lindgren; Hello by Martin Solveig, Martina Sorbara (feat. Dragonette); I Am the Best by Teddy Park performed by 2NE1
2016–2017	Scott & Fran's Paso Doble (from Strictly Ballroom) performed by David Hirschfelder & The Bogo Pogo Orchestra	Black Swan by Clint Mansell choreo. by Shin Yea-ji	
2015–2016	Hava Nagila Jewish Folk Music by various artists	Meeting Krishna (from Life of Pi) by Mychael Danna; Don't You Worry Child by Swedish House Mafia performed by The Piano Guys choreo. by Shin Yea-ji	Puttin' On the Ritz by Robbie Williams
2014–2015	Hava Nagila Jewish Folk Music by various artists	Romeo and Juliet: The Young Juliet; Montagues and Capulets by Sergei Prokofiev	

== Records and achievements ==
- Was the first torch bearer in the South Korean stretch of the 2018 Winter Olympics torch relay
- Listed in Forbes's 30 under 30 - Asia 2018

== Competitive highlights ==
- GP – Event of the ISU Grand Prix Series
- JGP – Event of the ISU Junior Grand Prix Series
- CS – Event of the ISU Challenger Series
- TBD – Assigned
- WD – Withdrew from competition

Competition placements at senior level
Season	2014–15	2015–16	2016–17	2017–18	2018–19	2019–20	2020–21	2021–22	2022–23	2023–24	2025–26	2026–27
Winter Olympics								5th				
World Championships						C		5th		12th		
Four Continents Championships						2nd		6th				
South Korean Championships	6th	1st	5th	1st	1st	1st	4th	1st	11th	7th	8th	
GP Cup of China						4th						
GP Finland										8th		
GP France											9th	
GP NHK Trophy							7th	3rd			4th	TBD
GP Skate America								3rd		11th		7th
GP Skate Canada						3rd			3rd			
GP Wilson Trophy									4th			
CS Autumn Classic								2nd				
CS Lombardia Trophy						3rd						
CS Nepela Memorial										5th		
CS U.S. Classic						2nd			2nd			
Challenge Cup									6th			
Cranberry Cup								2nd				
Philadelphia Summer									6th			

Competition placements at junior level
Season	2017–18	2018–19	2019–20
Winter Youth Olympics			1st
World Junior Championships		9th	6th
JGP Canada		4th	
JGP Croatia	4th		
JGP Italy	5th		
JGP Slovakia		3rd	
Bavarian Open		1st	
Children of Asia Games		1st	
Tallinn Trophy		1st	

== Detailed results ==
ISU personal best scores in the +5/-5 GOE System
Segment	Type	Score	Event
Total	**TSS**	**223.23**	2020 Four Continents
Short program	**TSS**	**78.22**	2019 Skate Canada
Short program	TES	45.54	2019 Skate Canada
Short program	PCS	34.04	2022 World Championships
Free skating	**TSS**	**149.68**	2020 Four Continents
Free skating	TES	79.94	2020 Four Continents
Free skating	PCS	69.74	2020 Four Continents

=== Senior level ===
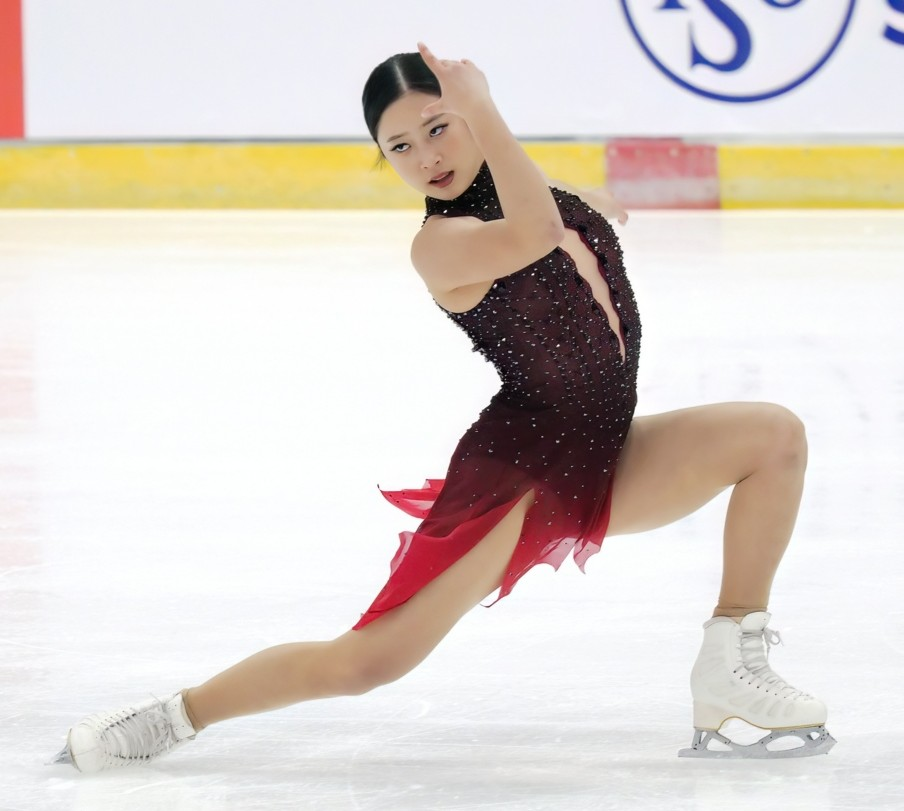
You during her short program at the 2022 MK John Wilson Trophy

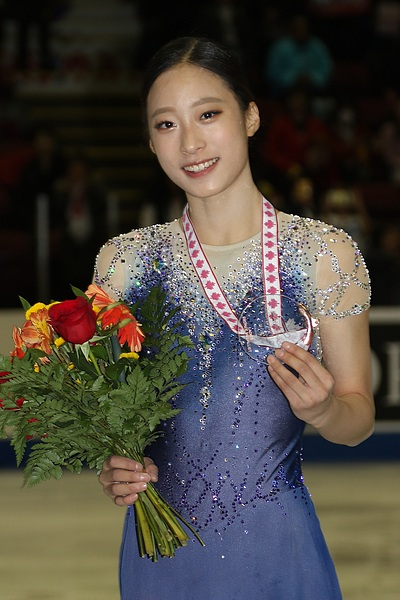
You during the medal ceremony at 2019 Skate Canada International

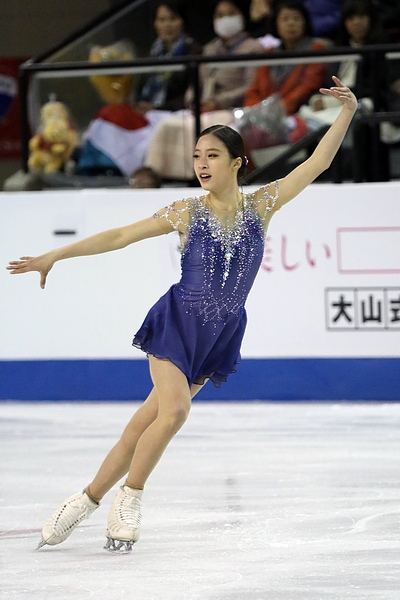
You performing her free skate at 2019 Skate Canada International

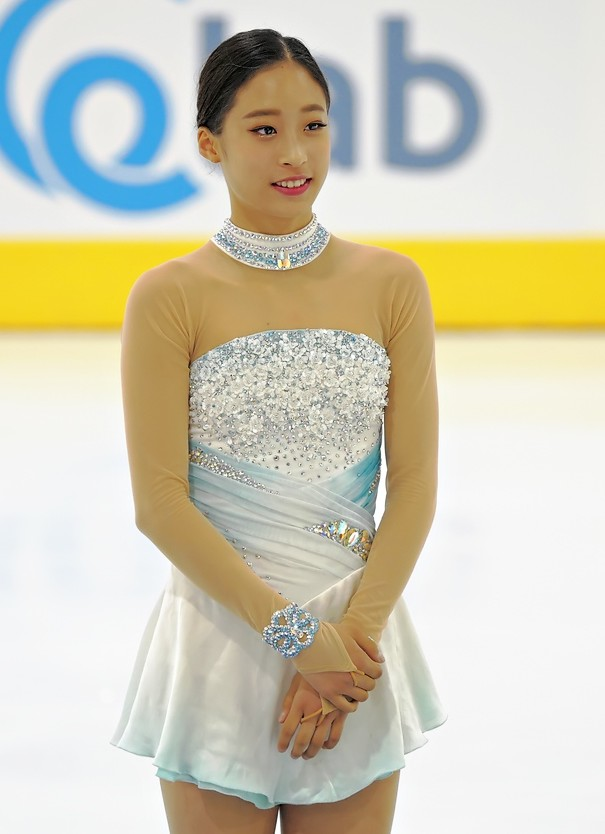
You during the medal ceremony at the 2019 CS Lombardia Trophy

- Small medals for the short program and free skating are only awarded at ISU Championships.
- ISU Personal Bests highlighted in **bold**.

Results in the 2019–20 season
Date	Event	SP		FS		Total	
Date	Event	P	Score	P	Score	P	Score
Jul 31 – Aug 3, 2019	(United States) 2019 Philadelphia Summer International	2	64.87	1	128.61	1	193.48
Sep 13 – 15, 2019	(Italy) 2019 CS Lombardia Trophy	2	70.47	3	130.42	3	200.89
Sep 17 – 22, 2019	(United States) 2019 CS U.S. Classic	4	58.04	1	141.25	2	199.29
Oct 25 – 27, 2019	2019 Skate Canada International	2	**78.22**	4	139.27	3	217.49
Nov 8 – 10, 2019	2019 Cup of China	7	61.49	4	130.32	4	191.81
Jan 3 – 5, 2020	(South Korea) 2020 South Korean Championships	1	76.53	1	143.67	1	220.20
Feb 4 – 9, 2020	(South Korea) 2020 Four Continents Championships	3	73.55	2	**149.68**	2	**223.23**

Results in the 2020–21 season
Date	Event	SP		FS		Total	
Date	Event	P	Score	P	Score	P	Score
Nov 27 – 29, 2020	(Japan) 2020 NHK Trophy	12	55.56	5	126.17	7	181.73
Feb 24 – 26, 2021	(South Korea) 2021 South Korean Championships	1	69.87	5	124.94	4	194.81

Results in the 2021–22 season
Date	Event	SP		FS		Total	
Date	Event	P	Score	P	Score	P	Score
Aug 12 – 15, 2021	(United States) 2021 Cranberry Cup International	5	59.74	2	123.14	2	182.88
Sep 16 – 18, 2021	(Canada) 2021 CS Autumn Classic International	3	60.66	1	119.59	2	180.25
Oct 22 – 24, 2021	(United States) 2021 Skate America	5	70.73	2	146.24	3	216.97
Nov 12 – 14, 2021	(Japan) 2021 NHK Trophy	3	68.08	2	135.52	3	203.60
Jan 7 – 9, 2022	(South Korea) 2022 South Korean Championships	1	76.55	1	144.94	1	221.49
Jan 18 – 23, 2022	(Estonia) 2022 Four Continents Championships	4	67.86	7	130.70	6	198.56
Feb 15 – 17, 2022	(China) 2022 Winter Olympics	5	70.34	4	142.75	5	213.09
Mar 21 – 27, 2022	(France) 2022 World Championships	4	72.08	6	132.83	5	204.91

Results in the 2022–23 season
Date	Event	SP		FS		Total	
Date	Event	P	Score	P	Score	P	Score
Sep 12 – 15, 2022	(United States) 2022 CS U.S. Classic	1	63.19	2	120.21	2	183.40
Oct 28 – 30, 2022	(France) 2022 Skate Canada International	2	68.93	4	125.83	2	194.76
Nov 11 – 13, 2022	(United Kingdom) 2022 MK John Wilson Trophy	6	61.21	3	130.15	4	191.36
Jan 5 – 8, 2023	(South Korea) 2023 South Korean Championships	9	64.06	15	108.90	11	172.96
Feb 23 – 26, 2023	(Netherlands) 2023 International Challenge Cup	13	52.59	5	123.21	6	175.80

Results in the 2023–24 season
Date	Event	SP		FS		Total	
Date	Event	P	Score	P	Score	P	Score
Sep 28 – 30, 2023	(Slovakia) 2023 CS Nepela Memorial	4	63.88	5	118.92	5	181.80
Oct 20 – 22, 2023	(United States) 2023 Skate America	12	56.21	11	101.15	11	157.36
Nov 17 – 19, 2023	(Finland) 2023 Grand Prix of Espoo	4	63.46	9	104.68	8	168.14
Jan 4 – 7, 2024	(South Korea) 2024 South Korean Championships	2	68.96	7	127.00	7	195.96
Mar 18 – 24, 2024	(Canada) 2024 World Championships	5	67.37	14	115.98	12	183.3

Results in the 2025–26 season
Date	Event	SP		FS		Total	
Date	Event	P	Score	P	Score	P	Score
Oct 17–19, 2025	2025 Grand Prix de France	10	54.40	8	117.42	9	171.82
Nov 7–9, 2025	(Japan) 2025 NHK Trophy	3	67.66	4	131.16	4	198.82
Jan 3–6, 2026	(South Korea) 2026 South Korean Championships	10	60.11	6	122.98	8	183.09

Results in the 2026–27 season
Date	Event	SP		FS		Total	
Date	Event	P	Score	P	Score	P	Score
Nov 13–15, 2026	(United States) 2026 Skate America	8	65.60	6	127.45	7	193.05

=== Junior level ===
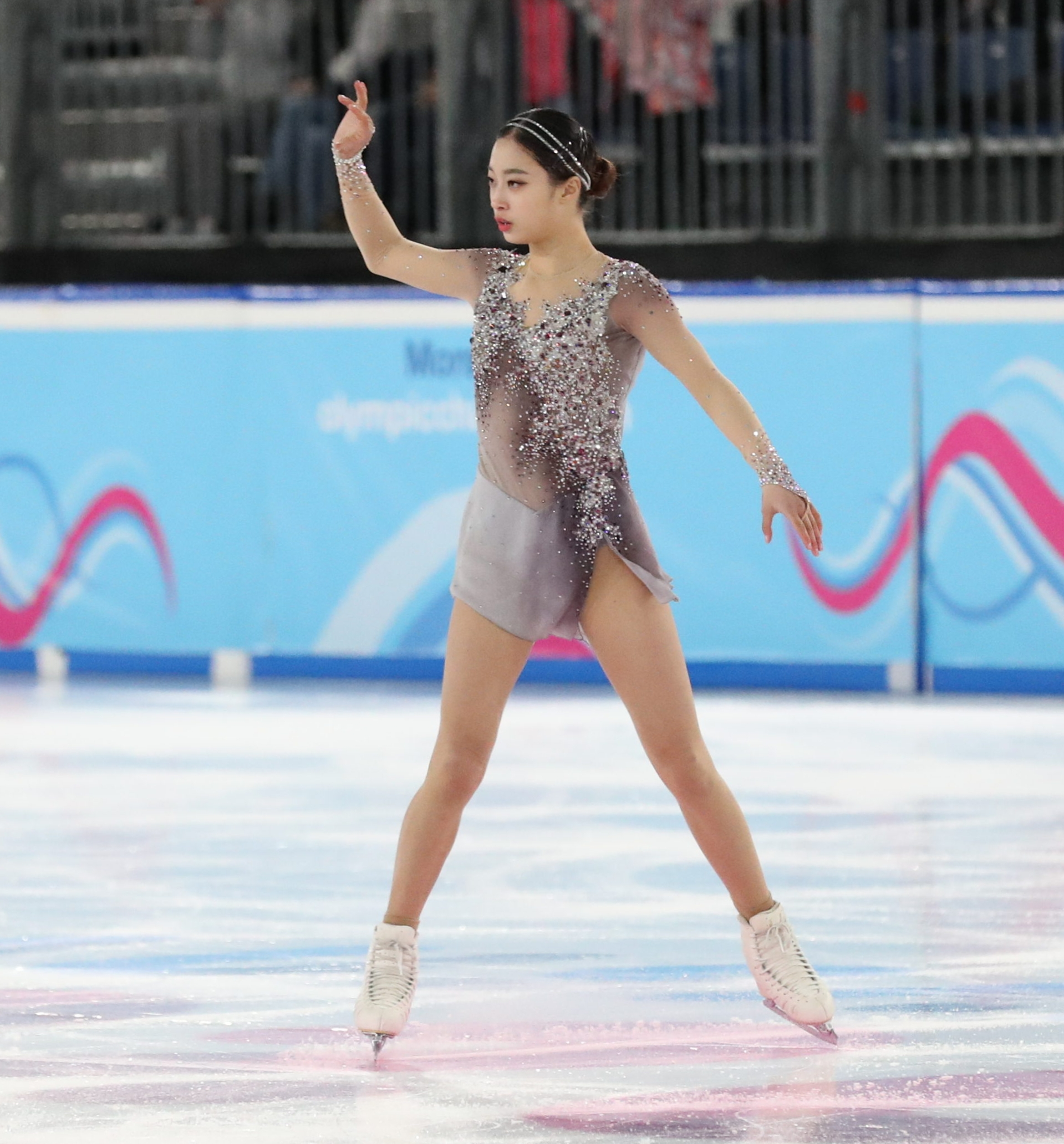
You at the 2020 Winter Youth Olympics

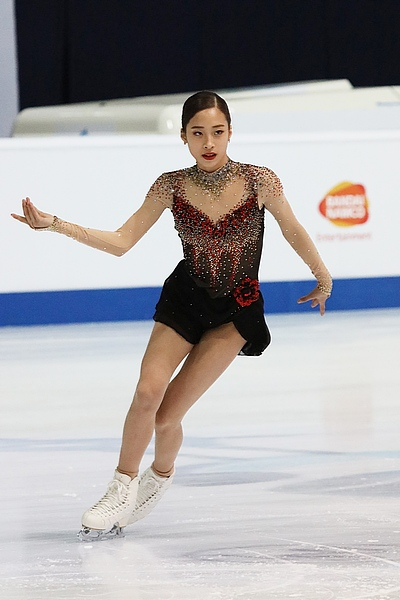
You at the 2019 World Junior Championships

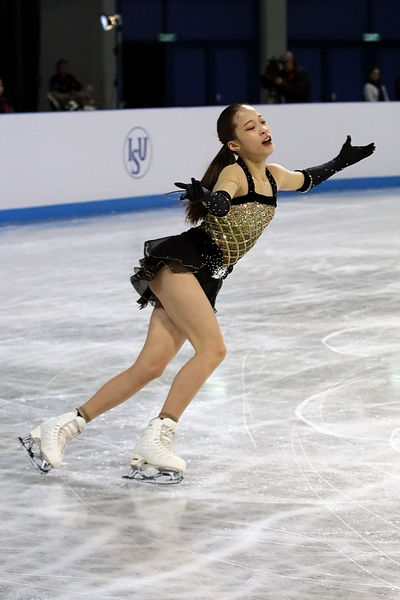
You at the 2018 World Junior Championships

Results in the 2014-15 season
Date	Event	SP		FS		Total	
Date	Event	P	Score	P	Score	P	Score
Jan 7 – 9, 2015	(South Korea) 2015 South Korean Championships (Senior)	6	52.15	7	97.14	6	149.29

Results in the 2015-16 season
Date	Event	SP		FS		Total	
Date	Event	P	Score	P	Score	P	Score
Jan 8 – 10, 2016	(South Korea) 2016 South Korean Championships (Senior)	1	61.09	1	122.66	1	183.75

Results in the 2016-17 season
Date	Event	SP		FS		Total	
Date	Event	P	Score	P	Score	P	Score
Jan 6 – 8, 2017	(South Korea) 2017 South Korean Championships (Senior)	6	58.71	2	122.17	5	180.88

Results in the 2017-18 season
Date	Event	SP		FS		Total	
Date	Event	P	Score	P	Score	P	Score
Sep 27 – 30, 2017	2017 JGP Croatia	5	53.81	3	109.61	4	163.42
Oct 11 – 14, 2017	2017 JGP Italy	5	60.42	4	117.28	5	177.70
Jan 5 – 7, 2018	(South Korea) 2018 South Korean Championships (Senior)	1	69.53	1	135.15	1	204.68
Mar 5 – 11, 2018	(Bulgaria) 2018 World Junior Championships	9	59.79	8	111.99	9	171.78

Results in the 2018-19 season
Date	Event	SP		FS		Total	
Date	Event	P	Score	P	Score	P	Score
Aug 22 – 25, 2018	(Slovenia) 2018 JGP Slovakia	3	64.45	4	119.53	3	183.98
Sep 12 – 15, 2018	2018 JGP Canada	4	60.66	4	111.19	4	171.85
Nov 30 – Dec 2, 2018	(Estonia) 2018 Tallinn Trophy	1	50.17	1	113.50	1	163.67
Jan 11 – 13, 2019	(South Korea) 2019 South Korean Championships (Senior)	1	67.68	1	130.95	1	198.63
Feb 5 – 10, 2019	(Germany) 2019 Bavarian Trophy	1	68.24	1	127.26	1	195.50
Feb 13 – 15, 2019	(Russia) 2019 Winter Children of Asia International Sports Games	1	71.39	3	134.43	1	205.82
Mar 4 – 10, 2019	(Croatia) 2019 World Junior Championships	11	55.62	5	123.20	6	178.82

Results in the 2019-20 season
Date	Event	SP		FS		Total	
Date	Event	P	Score	P	Score	P	Score
Jan 10 – 15, 2020	(South Korea) 2020 Winter Youth Olympics	1	73.51	1	140.49	1	214.00

== Awards and recognition ==
Year	Awards
2016	21st Coca-Cola Sports Awards: Rookie of the Year
2016	Korean Skating Union Merit Player Award Ceremony: Best Newcomer Award
2016	Sports Marketing Award Korea: Promising Female Athlete
2016	Gyeonggi Newspaper Sports Athlete Award: Most Valuable Player
2017	2018 Pyeongchang Olympics: the 1st torch bearer in South Korea
