= Yu Xiaoyu =

Chinese pair skater (born 1996)

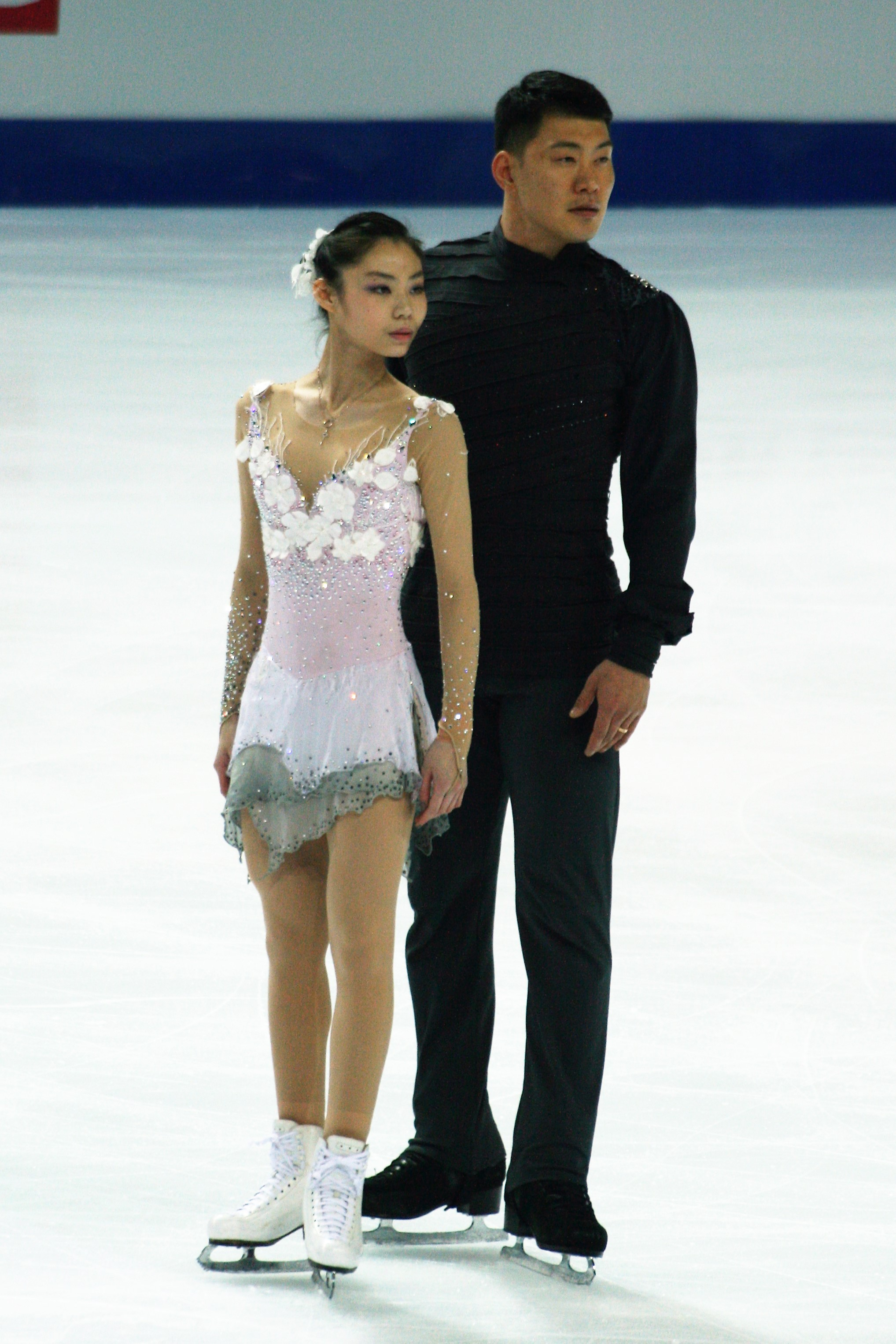
- Yu and Zhang in 2016

Personal information
- Born: 2 January 1998 (age 28) Beijing, China
- Home town: Beijing
- Height: 1.62 m (5 ft 4 in)

Figure skating career
- Country: China
- Coach: Hongbo Zhao, Bin Yao, Bing Han
- Skating club: Beijing Century Star FSC
- Retired: 2021
Medal record
Figure skating: Pairs
Representing China (with Zhang Hao)
Grand Prix Final
Silver medal – second place	2016–17 Marseille	Pairs
Asian Winter Games
Gold medal – first place	2017 Sapporo	Pairs
Representing China (with Jin Yang)
Four Continents Championships
Bronze medal – third place	2016 Taipei	Pairs
Winter Universiade
Gold medal – first place	2015 Granada	Pairs
Winter Youth Olympics
Gold medal – first place	2012 Innsbruck	Pairs
World Junior Championships
Gold medal – first place	2014 Sofia	Pairs
Gold medal – first place	2015 Tallinn	Pairs
Silver medal – second place	2012 Minsk	Pairs
Junior Grand Prix Final
Gold medal – first place	2013–14 Fukuoka	Pairs
Bronze medal – third place	2010–11 Beijing	Pairs

Yu Xiaoyu (Chinese: 于小雨; pinyin: Yú Xiǎoyǔ; Mandarin pronunciation: [y̌ ɕjàʊ ỳ]) is a former Chinese pair skater. With partner Zhang Hao, she is the 2016–17 Grand Prix Final silver medalist, 2017 Asian Winter Games champion and 2018 Chinese national champion. With partner Jin Yang, she is a two-time (2014, 2015) World Junior champion, the 2012 World Junior silver medalist, the 2012 Winter Youth Olympics champion, the 2013–2014 JGP Final champion, and the 2016 Four Continents bronze medalist. She was born in Beijing.

== Partnership with Jin Yang ==
Yu/Jin were paired together by their coaches in 2009. They did on- and off-ice training from eight in the morning to five in the afternoon with a break in the middle.

=== 2010–11 season ===
Yu/Jin won the silver medal at the 2010 Chinese Nationals. They made their international debut during the 2010–11 season. They won bronze at JGP Cup of Austria and then won gold at Czech Skate. At the Junior Grand Prix Final, they won the bronze medal.

=== 2011–12 season ===
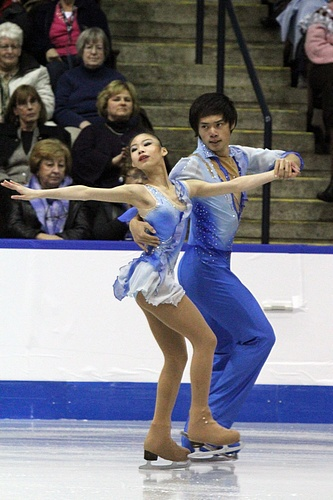
Yu and Jin at 2011 Skate Canada

The pair performed a quad twist at a national competition in 2011, when Yu was 15 and Jin was 17 years old (or 13 and 22). They finished 7th at the 2011 Skate Canada and 6th at the 2011 Cup of China. They then won the bronze medal at their national championships. Yu/Jin competed at the 2012 World Junior Championships and won the silver medal behind teammates and training partners Sui Wenjing/Han Cong.

=== 2012–13 season ===
In the 2012-13 season, Yu/Jin finished 4th in JGP Austria and 2nd in JGP Croatia in their JGP Events. They finished 5th at the JGP Final. Yu/Jin then competed at the 2013 World Junior Championships and finished 4th.

=== 2013–14 season ===
Prior to the 2013-14 season, Yu/Jin changed coaches, moving from Luan Bo to Olympic pairs champion Zhao Hongbo, Yao Bin, and Han Bing. They won the gold medals in their JGP events at the 2013 JGP Latvia and 2013 JGP Estonia qualifying them to their fourth JGP Final in Fukuoka, Japan where they won the gold medal. Yu/Jin finished their perfect season by winning gold at the 2014 World Junior Championships in Sofia, Bulgaria.

=== 2014–15 season ===
In the 2014-15 season, Yu/Jin made their official senior debut on the Grand Prix circuit. They won a silver medal at the 2014 Cup of China and a bronze medal at the 2014 NHK Trophy, qualifying them for their first senior Grand Prix Final in Barcelona, Spain. At the Grand Prix Final they set new personal bests in both the short program and free skate to finish in 5th place. They then went on to win their second national title. With the surprise comeback of Pang/Tong, Yu/Jin were not given a spot to compete at the Four Continents Championships in Seoul and the World Championships in Shanghai, China. Instead, they were sent to the 2015 Winter Universiade where they won the gold medal. It was later announced that they would compete at the 2015 World Junior Figure Skating Championships in Tallinn, Estonia. Despite training senior program layouts for much of the season, they managed to successfully defend their Junior World title, winning both segments of the competition.

=== 2015–16 season ===
Yu/Jin were assigned to Cup of China and NHK Trophy. They attempted their first throw quadruple salchow in competition at Cup of China and won a bronze medal. They then went on to win silver at 2015 NHK Trophy which helped qualify them for the 2015–16 Grand Prix Final in Barcelona. At the Final they placed 5th.

At the 2016 Four Continents Championships, Yu/Jin claimed the bronze.

== Partnership with Zhang Hao ==
=== 2016–17 season ===
On April 14, 2016, International Figure Skating magazine broke the news of Yu's new partnership with Zhang Hao. The Chinese Skating Association decided to switch partners between the two pairs of Peng/Zhang and Yu/Jin. They took the silver medal at the 2016 Skate Canada and won gold at the 2016 Cup of China. At the 2016–17 Grand Prix Final in Marseille they won the silver medal behind Evgenia Tarasova / Vladimir Morozov.

=== 2017–18 season ===
Yu/Zhang began their season at the 2017 Cup of Nice where they placed first. In their first Grand Prix event of the season, Yu/Zhang placed second at the 2017 Cup of China after ranking second in both the short program and free skate. In their second Grand Prix event at 2017 Skate America, Yu/Zhang again placed second after ranking second in both programs. Their scores in both Grand Prix events have qualified Yu/Zhang for the 2017-18 Grand Prix Final, where they placed sixth. They won the Chinese National Championship and were named to the Chinese Olympic and World teams. They placed eighth at the Olympics, and seventh at Worlds.

=== 2018-19 and 2019-20 seasons ===
Due to injury, they withdrew from both of their 2018-19 Grand Prix events and did not compete at Nationals. They did not compete again until the 2019-20 Nationals, where they placed fourth.

== Partner Change and Retirement ==
=== 2020-21 season ===
In September 2020, it was reported that Yu and Zhang had split, and that Yu was now paired with Wang Lei. Zhang would announce his retirement later in the season.

In April 2021, she announced her retirement.

== Age controversy ==
In February 2011, a group of Chinese skaters' ages became the subject of controversy as their birth dates published on the Chinese Skating Association's website did not match the ones listed on their bio pages in the ISU website. The controversy prompted a search for more discrepancies among Chinese figure skaters' dates of births. According to news articles published in February 2011, although Yu's birthday was listed as 2 January 1996 on ISU's website, the Chinese website suggested that she was born on that day in 1998. Her then partner Jin Yang did not seem to have a controversy. Officials from the State General Administration of Sports held a press conference where they attributed the discrepancies to erroneous information provided by the Chinese website.

== Programs ==
=== With Zhang Hao ===
Season	Short program	Free skating	Exhibition
2019–20	"Leave a Light On" by Tom Walker choreo. by Benoît Richaud	November by Max Richter choreo. by Benoît Richaud	
2018–19	Did not compete this season		
2017–18	Swan Lake by Pyotr Ilyich Tchaikovsky choreo. by Lori Nichol	Jyn Erso and Hope Suite (from Rogue One: A Star Wars Story) by Michael Giacchino; Princess Leia's Theme (from Star Wars: A New Hope) by John Williams choreo. by Lori Nichol	Endless Love by Lionel Richie performed by Luther Vandross and Mariah Carey
2016–17	Eternal Flame; Fearless by Brand X Music choreo. by David Wilson	Cavatina; Larghetto Amoroso by Emil von Sauer choreo. by Lori Nichol	Leon by Eric Serra

=== With Jin Yang ===
Season	Short program	Free skating	Exhibition
2015–16	Yulunga (Spirit Dance) by Dead Can Dance choreo. by David Wilson	Humility and Love (from "Creation" soundtrack) by Christopher Young choreo. by David Wilson	See You Again by Wiz Khalifa ft. Charlie Puth performed by Jeric T
2014–15	Yulunga (Spirit Dance) by Dead Can Dance choreo. by David Wilson	Humility and Love (from "Creation" soundtrack) by Christopher Young choreo. by David Wilson	Everyday I Miss You (from Nessun dorma) by Sun Nan; A Hundred Thousand Teardrops by Tanya Chua
2013–14	Méditation by Jules Massenet choreo. by Marina Zueva	The Phantom of the Opera by Andrew Lloyd Webber choreo. by Marina Zueva	All I Ask of You (from The Phantom of the Opera) by Andrew Lloyd Webber; You're Not From Here by Lara Fabian choreo. by Zhang Wei; Yue Guang Di Tan by Rachel Liang
2012–13	Violin Concerto in E minor, Op. 64 by Felix Mendelssohn choreo. by Marina Zueva	Die Fledermaus by Johann Strauss II choreo. by Marina Zueva	
2011–12	The Nutcracker by Pyotr Tchaikovsky choreo. by Zhang Wei	Requiem for a Dream by Clint Mansell choreo. by Marina Zueva	You're Not From Here by Lara Fabian choreo. by Zhang Wei
2010–11	I Allegro by Samuel Barber	Romeo and Juliet by Sergei Prokofiev	
2009–10	The Love of Death by Park Sei Joon	The Way We Were by Marvin Hamlisch	
2008–09	unknown	Sheeta's Decision (from Castle in the Sky) by Joe Hisaishi	

== Competitive highlights ==
- GP – Event of the ISU Grand Prix Series
- JGP – Event of the ISU Junior Grand Prix Series

=== With Zhang ===
International
Event	2016–17	2017–18	2019-20
Olympics		8th	
Worlds	4th	7th	
Four Continents	4th		
GP Final	2nd	6th	
GP Cup of China	1st	2nd	
GP Skate Canada	2nd		
GP Skate America		2nd	
Asian Games	1st		
Cup of Nice		1st	
National
Chinese Champ.		1st	4th
Team events
Olympics		6th T	

=== Pair skating with Jin Yang ===
Competition placements at senior level
Season	2008–09	2009–10	2010–11	2011–12	2012–13	2013–14	2014–15	2015–16
Four Continents Championships								3rd
Grand Prix Final							5th	5th
Chinese Championships	6th	4th	2nd	3rd	1st	3rd	1st	
GP Cup of China				6th			2nd	3rd
GP NHK Trophy							3rd	2nd
GP Skate Canada				7th				
Chinese National Games	7th			4th				
Winter Universiade							1st	

Competition placements at junior level
Season	2010–11	2011–12	2012–13	2013–14	2014–15
World Junior Championships		2nd	4th	1st	1st
Winter Youth Olympics		1st			
Junior Grand Prix Final	3rd	5th	5th	1st	
JGP Austria	3rd	2nd	4th		
JGP Croatia			2nd		
JGP Czech Republic	1st				
JGP Estonia				1st	
JGP Latvia		2nd		1st	
