= Figure skating at the 2011 Asian Winter Games – Pairs =

Pairs at the 2011 Asian Winter Games
- Venue: Saryarka Velodrome
- Dates: 3–5 February 2011
- Competitors: 8 from 3 nations

Medalists
gold medal	Tong Jian; Pang Qing	China
silver medal	Han Cong; Sui Wenjing	China
bronze medal	Thae Won-hyok; Ri Ji-hyang	North Korea

The pair skating event was held over two days. On February 3 at 17:00 the short program was held while the free skating took place on February 5 at 20:15.

== Schedule ==
All times are Almaty Time (UTC+06:00)

Date	Time	Event
Thursday, 3 February 2011	17:00	Short program
Saturday, 5 February 2011	20:15	Free skating

== Results ==
Legend

- WD — Withdrawn

Rank	Team	SP	FS	Total
1st place, gold medalist(s)	China (CHN); Tong Jian; Pang Qing	68.36	127.54	195.90
2nd place, silver medalist(s)	China (CHN); Han Cong; Sui Wenjing	59.22	118.32	177.54
3rd place, bronze medalist(s)	North Korea (PRK); Thae Won-hyok; Ri Ji-hyang	53.60	89.44	143.04
—	Kazakhstan (KAZ); Vladimir Rudi; Lidiya Voblenko			WD
