= Yang Jin =

Chinese painter

Yang Jin (simplified Chinese: 杨晋; traditional Chinese: 楊晉; pinyin: Yáng Jìn; Wade–Giles: Yang Chin); ca. (1644-1728) was a Chinese painter during the Qing Dynasty (1644–1912).

Yang was born in Changshu in the Jiangsu province. His style name was 'Zi He' (子鶴) and his pseudonym was 'Xi Ting' (西停). Yang's paintings were meticulous and exquisite, in the style of Wang Hui.
