= Zhang Wei (figure skater) =

Chinese figure skater

Personal information
- Full name: Zhang Wei

Figure skating career
- Country: China
- Retired: 2001
Medal record
Figure skating
Ice dancing
Representing China
Asian Winter Games
Gold medal – first place	1999 Gangwon	Ice dancing

Zhang Wei was a member of Chinese Figure Skating National Team, a Chinese ice dancer, and a Single skater. With partner Wang Rui, they won the gold medal in 1999 Asian Winter Games. They placed 4th at the 1998 Cup of China (ISU JGP). They placed 10th at the 2000 Four Continents Figure Skating Championships.

Following Zhang's retirement from competitive skating, Zhang has worked as a coach and choreographer. Among Zhang's current and former students and clients are World Championships Champion Sui Wenjing, Han Cong, Four Continents Champion Yu Xiaoyu, Jin Yang, and Peng Cheng, Zhang Hao; China National Championships Bronze Medalist Wang Jialei, Thai National Champion Amy Alisara Arirachakaran, and Phanyaluck Raisuksiri; and Singapore National Champion Anja Chong. Zhang also worked as a figure skating judge for China.

In 2017, Zhang worked together with Chinese famous film director Zhang Yimou, who was also the general director of 2008 Beijing Olympic Opening Ceremony, for figure skating TV show 'Kua Jin Bing Xue Wang (跨界冰雪王)'.

2017 Figure skating TV Show 'Kua Jie Bing Xue Wang (跨界冰雪王)' - Director and Choreographer

2016 Amazing On Ice - Director and Choreographer

2009 – present official choreographer of China National Junior Team

2008-2012 Manager of Heilongjiang Jun Yi Interior Design and Engineering Co., Ltd.

2006-2008 Figure skating Coach of Fuji Ice Palace, Singapore

2004-2006 Head coach of Thailand National Figure Skating Junior Team

2003-2006 General Manager and Head Coach of Bangkok International Figure Skating Co., Ltd.

2001-2003 Figure skating coach, Super Ice World Kallang, Singapore

== Results ==
(with Wang)

Event	1998-99	1999-00
Four Continents Championships		10th
Cup of China (ISU JPG)	4th	
Asian Winter Games	1st	

1997 the Paekdusan Prize (DPR Korea) - 7th Place

1996 Asian Figure Skating Championships – 7th Place

== Competitive highlights ==
(Sui Wenjing / Han Cong)

Event	2009–10	2010–11	2011–12
World Championships			9th
Four Continents Championships			1st
World Junior Championships	1st	1st	1st
Asian Winter Games		2nd	
Chinese Championships	1st	1st	2nd
Grand Prix Final		3rd	
Skate Canada			2nd
Cup of China		2nd	5th
Skate America		3rd	
Junior Grand Prix Final	1st		1st
Junior Grand Prix, Latvia			1st
Junior Grand Prix, Austria		2nd	1st
Junior Grand Prix, Germany	1st	1st	
Junior Grand Prix, Belarus	1st		

(Yu Xiaoyu / Jin Yang)

Event	2011–12
Winter Youth Olympics	1st
World Junior Championships	2nd
Chinese Championships	3rd
Chinese National Games	4th
Cup of China	6th
Skate Canada	7th
Junior Grand Prix Final	5th
JGP Austria	2nd
JGP Volvo Cup, Latvia	2nd

== Programs Choreographed ==
(Sui Wenjing / Han Cong)

Season	Short program	Free skating	Exhibition
2016			Angel* choreo. by Zhang Wei music edited by Zhang Wei *a special program for Amazing On Ice show
2012–2013			Painted on My Heart choreo. by Zhang Wei music edited by Zhang Wei music from: Soundtrack 'Gone in 60 seconds’ track no.1
2011–2012	Country Dance by Josh Turner choreo. by Zhang Wei music edited by Zhang Wei		Terracotta Warriors of Love choreo. by Zhang Wei music edited by Zhang Wei music from: Soundtrack 'House of Flying Daggers’ track no.2, Chinese Song "Dragon's Descendants", Soundtrack "House of Flying Daggers" track no.7, 1, Music CD "the Drums of Jiangzhou" track no.7, "House of Flying Daggers" track no.3, musical “Terracotta Warriors" track no.13 & 15
2010–2011	Country Dance by Josh Turner choreo. by Zhang Wei music edited by Zhang Wei	City Lights by Charlie Chaplin choreo. by Zhang Wei music edited by Zhang Wei	Puppetry choreo. by Zhang Wei music edited by Zhang Wei
2009–2010	Barynia (Russian folk music)	City Lights by Charlie Chaplin choreo. by Zhang Wei music edited by Zhang Wei	

(Yu XiaoYu /)

Season	Short program	Exhibition
2011–2012	The Nutcracker by Pyotr Ilyich Tchaikovsky choreo. by Zhang Wei music edited by Zhang Wei	You Are Not From Here by Lara Fabian choreo. by Zhang Wei music edited by Zhang Wei
2016-2017		Frankenstein choreo. by Zhang Wei music edited by Zhang Wei

(Yu XiaoYu / Zhang Hao)

Season	Short program	Exhibition
2016-2017		Leon choreo. by Zhang Wei music edited by Zhang Wei

(Wang Wenting / Zhang Yan)

Season	Short program	Free skating
2012–2013	Vampire choreo. by Zhang Wei music edited by Zhang Wei original music by Elliot Goldenthal & Two Steps from Hell	The Last Samurai choreo. by Zhang Wei music edited by Zhang Wei music from: Soundtrack 'The Last Samurai’ by Hans Zimmer

== Choreographed Ice Show & Group Number ==
Year	Venue	Name of the Show	Program	CAST
2017	Beijing TV Channel	Kua Jie Bing Xue Wang (跨界冰雪王)	all programs in the show (including solo program and Group Number)	Chinese Movie Stars and former Chinese National Team skaters
2016.7.15	Capital Indoor Stadium; Beijing, China	Amazing On Ice	Opening music: Mixed: Bee Gees 'Saturday Night Fever'; Nicky Romero & NERVO 'Like Home'	Johnny Weir; Evgeni Plushenko; Stephane Lambiel; Adelina Sotnikova; Joannie Rochette; Meryl Davis & Charlie White; Tatiana Volosozhar & Maxim Trankov; Jin Boyang; Yu Xiaoyu & Hao Zhang; Cheng Peng & Yang Jin
2016.7.15	Capital Indoor Stadium; Beijing, China	Amazing On Ice	Tango; 2nd Half Opening music: Mixed: Carlos Gardel 'Por Una Cabeza'; G.H.Rodriguez 'La Cumparsita'	Johnny Weir; Evgeni Plushenko; Stephane Lambiel; Adelina Sotnikova; Joannie Rochette; Meryl Davis & Charlie White; Tatiana Volosozhar & Maxim Trankov; Jin Boyang; Yu Xiaoyu & Hao Zhang; Cheng Peng & Yang Jin
2016.7.15	Capital Indoor Stadium; Beijing, China	Amazing On Ice	Finale music: Nicky Romero & NERVO 'Like Home'	Johnny Weir; Evgeni Plushenko; Stephane Lambiel; Adelina Sotnikova; Joannie Rochette; Meryl Davis & Charlie White; Tatiana Volosozhar & Maxim Trankov; Jin Boyang; Yu Xiaoyu & Hao Zhang; Cheng Peng & Yang Jin; Han Cong; Fang Shuai; Zhang Yixuan
2016.7.15	Capital Indoor Stadium; Beijing, China	Amazing On Ice	Say Something; Story of 2 Chinese Pair teams music: A Great Big World, Christina Aguilera 'Say Something'	Yu Xiaoyu & Hao Zhang; Cheng Peng & Yang Jin
2016.7.15	Capital Indoor Stadium; Beijing, China	Amazing On Ice	Angel; Story of Sui Wenjing & Han Cong music: Sarah McLachlan 'Angel'	Han Cong & Sui Wenjing
2012.1.3	Changchun Wuhuan Gymnasium; Changchun, China	2012 China Winter Games	Opening Ceremony music: '掌声响起来'	Zhao Hongbo & Shen Xue
2009.2.24	Harbin International Conference, Exhibition and Sports Center Gym; Harbin, China	2009 Winter Universiade	Finale music: 'Singin' in the rain', Maksim 'Hana's Eyes', High School Musical 'We're all in this together'	Top 4 in each events, including synchronized skating team Total over 80 skaters This was the first time, the Synchronized competition together with figure skating completion in world class competition. This also was the first time, Synchronized competitors and figure skating competitors together doing Finale program after competition.
2009.2.21	Harbin International Conference, Exhibition and Sports Center Gym; Harbin, China	2009 Winter Universiade	Figure Skating Competition Opening music: edited by Zhang Wei; Karunesh 'Earth Song'; Tim Wheater 'En Trance'; James Newton 'Fairy Dance' 'Mo Li Hua'; Shigeru Umebayashi 'Beauty Song'; Descendants of the Dragon'; China central Ballet Troupe Orchestra '白毛女' Wedding	Chinese Novice Levels skaters
