= Wang Rui (figure skater) =

Chinese ice dancer

Personal information
- Full name: Wang Rui

Figure skating career
- Country: China
Medal record
Figure skating
Ice dancing
Representing China
Asian Winter Games
Gold medal – first place	1999 Gangwon	Ice dancing

Wang Rui is a Chinese ice dancer. With partner Zhang Wei, she is the 1999 Asian Winter Games champion. They placed 10th at the 2000 Four Continents Figure Skating Championships.

Following her retirement from competitive skating, she works for the Chinese Athletes Educational Foundation as an English language teacher.

== Results ==
(with Zhang)

Event	1998–99	1999–00
Four Continents Championships		10th
Asian Winter Games	1st	
