= List of Asian Games medalists in figure skating =

This is the complete list of Asian Winter Games medalists in figure skating from 1986 to 2025.

== Events ==
=== Men's singles ===
Games	Gold	Silver	Bronze
1986 Sapporo	Makoto Kano (JPN)	Zhang Shubin (CHN)	Xu Zhaoxiao (CHN)
1996 Harbin	Guo Zhengxin (CHN)	Zhang Min (CHN)	Li Xia (CHN)
1999 Gangwon	Li Chengjiang (CHN)	Roman Skorniakov (UZB)	Guo Zhengxin (CHN)
2003 Aomori	Takeshi Honda (JPN)	Li Chengjiang (CHN)	Zhang Min (CHN)
2007 Changchun	Xu Ming (CHN)	Li Chengjiang (CHN)	Kensuke Nakaniwa (JPN)
2011 Astana–Almaty	Denis Ten (KAZ)	Takahito Mura (JPN)	Song Nan (CHN)
2017 Sapporo	Shoma Uno (JPN)	Jin Boyang (CHN)	Yan Han (CHN)
2025 Harbin	Cha Jun-hwan (KOR)	Yuma Kagiyama (JPN)	Mikhail Shaidorov (KAZ)

=== Women's singles ===
Games	Gold	Silver	Bronze
1986 Sapporo	Juri Ozawa (JPN)	Masako Kato (JPN)	Fu Caishu (CHN)
1996 Harbin	Chen Lu (CHN)	Tatiana Malinina (UZB)	Fumie Suguri (JPN)
1999 Gangwon	Tatiana Malinina (UZB)	Shizuka Arakawa (JPN)	Fumie Suguri (JPN)
2003 Aomori	Shizuka Arakawa (JPN)	Fumie Suguri (JPN)	Yukari Nakano (JPN)
2007 Changchun	Yukari Nakano (JPN)	Fumie Suguri (JPN)	Xu Binshu (CHN)
2011 Astana–Almaty	Kanako Murakami (JPN)	Haruka Imai (JPN)	Kwak Min-jeong (KOR)
2017 Sapporo	Choi Da-bin (KOR)	Li Zijun (CHN)	Elizabet Tursynbayeva (KAZ)
2025 Harbin	Kim Chae-yeon (KOR)	Kaori Sakamoto (JPN)	Hana Yoshida (JPN)

=== Pairs ===
Games	Gold	Silver	Bronze
1986 Sapporo	Kim Hyok and Nam Hye-yong (PRK)	Fan Jun and Sun Jihong (CHN)	Shang Zhenyuan and Sun Dan (CHN)
1996 Harbin	Zhao Hongbo and Shen Xue (CHN)	Andrey Kryukov and Marina Khalturina (KAZ)	Liu Bingyang and Sun Bao (CHN)
1999 Gangwon	Zhao Hongbo and Shen Xue (CHN)	Andrey Kryukov and Marina Khalturina (KAZ)	Evgeni Sviridov and Natalia Ponomareva (UZB)
2003 Aomori	Zhao Hongbo and Shen Xue (CHN)	Tong Jian and Pang Qing (CHN)	Artem Knyazev and Marina Aganina (UZB)
2007 Changchun	Zhao Hongbo and Shen Xue (CHN)	Tong Jian and Pang Qing (CHN)	Xu Jiankun and Li Jiaqi (CHN)
2007 Changchun	Zhao Hongbo and Shen Xue (CHN)	Tong Jian and Pang Qing (CHN)	Artem Knyazev and Marina Aganina (UZB)
2011 Astana–Almaty	Tong Jian and Pang Qing (CHN)	Han Cong and Sui Wenjing (CHN)	Thae Won-hyok and Ri Ji-hyang (PRK)
2017 Sapporo	Zhang Hao and Yu Xiaoyu (CHN)	Jin Yang and Peng Cheng (CHN)	Kim Ju-sik and Ryom Tae-ok (PRK)
2025 Harbin	Dmitrii Chigirev and Ekaterina Geynish (UZB)	Han Kum-chol and Ryom Tae-ok (PRK)	Sumitada Moriguchi and Yuna Nagaoka (JPN)

=== Ice dance ===
Games	Gold	Silver	Bronze
1986 Sapporo	Zhao Xiaolei and Liu Luyang (CHN)	Hiroaki Tokita and Junko Ito (JPN)	Kenji Takino and Kaoru Takino (JPN)
1996 Harbin	Dmitriy Kazarlyga and Elizaveta Stekolnikova (KAZ)	Hiroshi Tanaka and Aya Kawai (JPN)	Cao Xianming and Zhang Weina (CHN)
1999 Gangwon	Zhang Wei and Wang Rui (CHN)	Kenji Miyamoto and Rie Arikawa (JPN)	Lee Chuen-gun and Yang Tae-hwa (KOR)
2003 Aomori	Cao Xianming and Zhang Weina (CHN)	Akiyuki Kido and Nozomi Watanabe (JPN)	Kenji Miyamoto and Rie Arikawa (JPN)
2007 Changchun	Akiyuki Kido and Nozomi Watanabe (JPN)	Zheng Xun and Huang Xintong (CHN)	Wang Chen and Yu Xiaoyang (CHN)
2011 Astana–Almaty	Zheng Xun and Huang Xintong (CHN)	Chris Reed and Cathy Reed (JPN)	Wang Chen and Yu Xiaoyang (CHN)
2017 Sapporo	Liu Xinyu and Wang Shiyue (CHN)	Chris Reed and Kana Muramoto (JPN)	Zhao Yan and Chen Hong (CHN)
2025 Harbin	Masaya Morita and Utana Yoshida (JPN)	Xing Jianing and Ren Junfei (CHN)	Shingo Nishiyama and Azusa Tanaka (JPN)
