= China at the 1988 Winter Olympics =

- IOC code: CHN
- NOC: Chinese Olympic Committee
- Website: www.olympic.cn (in Chinese and English)

in Calgary
- Competitors: 13 (6 men and 7 women) in 3 sports
- Flag bearer: Zhang Zhubin
- Medals: Gold 0 Silver 0 Bronze 0 Total 0

Winter Olympics appearances (overview)
- 1980; 1984; 1988; 1992; 1994; 1998; 2002; 2006; 2010; 2014; 2018; 2022; 2026

The People's Republic of China competed at the 1988 Winter Olympics in Calgary, Alberta, Canada.

== Competitors ==
The following is the list of number of competitors in the Games.

Sport	Men	Women	Total
Cross-country skiing	1	2	3
Figure skating	3	3	6
Speed skating	2	2	4
Total	6	7	13

== Cross-country skiing ==
Men

Event	Athlete	Race	
Event	Athlete	Time	Rank
15 km C	Zhao Jun	50:55.2	74
30 km C	Zhao Jun	1'39:13.9	64

C = Classical style, F = Freestyle

Women

Event	Athlete	Race	
Event	Athlete	Time	Rank
5 km C	Wang Jinfen	DNF	–
10 km C	Wang Jinfen	38:47.7	51
20 km F	Tang Yuqin	1'06:50.1	47

C = Classical style, F = Freestyle

== Figure skating ==
Men

Athlete	CF	SP	FS	TFP	Rank
Zhang Shubin	22	18	19	39.4	20

Women

Athlete	CF	SP	FS	TFP	Rank
Jiang Yibing	23	28	DNQ	DNF	–

Pairs

Athletes	SP	FS	TFP	Rank
Mei Zhibin; Li Wei	15	14	24.5	14

Ice Dancing

Athletes	CD	OD	FD	TFP	Rank
Liu Luyang; Zhao Xiaolei	19	19	19	38.0	19

== Speed skating ==
Men

Event	Athlete	Race	
Event	Athlete	Time	Rank
1500 m	Liu Yanfei	1:57.38	31
10,000 m	Lu Shuhai	14:49.52	29

Women

Event	Athlete	Race	
Event	Athlete	Time	Rank
3000 m	Zhang Qing	4:30.19	21
5000 m	Wang Xiaoyan	7:46.30	16
