= Chen Yudong =

Chinese figure skater

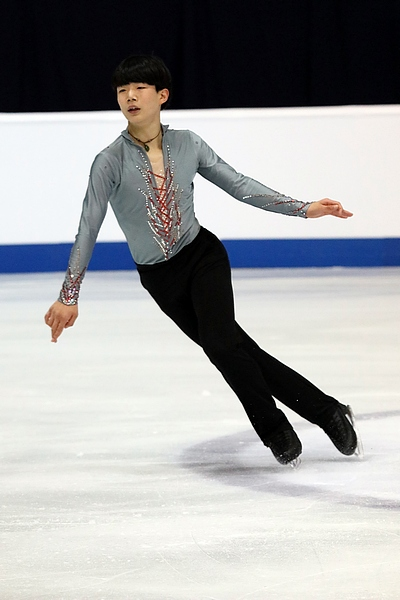
- Chen Yudong at the 2019 World Junior Championships

Personal information
- Native name: 陈昱东 (Chinese)
- Born: 28 September 2004 (age 22) Qiqihar, China
- Height: 1.79 m (5 ft 10 1/2 in)

Figure skating career
- Country: China
- Discipline: Men's singles
- Coach: Fang Dan; Rafael Arutyunyan
- Skating club: Qiqihar Winter Sports Center
- Began skating: 2007

Medal record
Chinese Championships
Gold medal – first place	2022 Chengde	Singles
Gold medal – first place	2023 Chengde	Singles
Gold medal – first place	2024 Chengde	Singles
Silver medal – second place	2025 Harbin	Singles

Chen Yudong (simplified Chinese: 陈昱东; traditional Chinese: 陳昱東; pinyin: Chén Yùdōng; born 28 September 2004) is a Chinese figure skater. He is the 2020 Cup of China bronze medalist, a three-time Chinese national champion (2022–24), and a two-time Chinese junior national champion (2020, 2022).

== Personal life ==
Chen was born on September 28, 2004 in Qiqihar, Heilongjiang, China. In addition to figure skating, he also enjoys singing and dancing.

== Career ==
=== Early career ===
Chen began figure skating in 2007. His first coach was Zhang Chunling.

He debuted at the 2016 Chinese Championships, where he finished thirteenth. Chen would go on to finish fourth at nationals in 2017 and 2018.

Before debuting internationally, Chen would move to Beijing, where Li Wei became his coach.

=== Junior career ===
==== 2018–19 season: First Junior Worlds ====
For the 2018–19 figure skating season, Chen was sent to California to temporarily train under Rafael Arutyunyan.

Making his international debut at the 2018 Golden Spin of Zagreb, Chen won the silver medal on the junior level. He then went on to take bronze at the 2019 Russian–Chinese Youth Games.

He was ultimately assigned to the 2019 Junior World Championships where he finished in twenty-fifth place after the short program and did not advance to the free skate.

==== 2019–20 season: Junior Grand Prix debut ====
Chen debuted in the Junior Grand Prix circuit and was assigned to the Courchevel and Egna/Neumkart, where he finished in ninth and sixth place, respectively. He also took gold at the 2020 Chinese Junior Championships.

He was then assigned to compete at the 2020 Winter Youth Olympics in Lausanne, where he finished in sixth place.

=== Senior career ===
==== 2020–21 season: Senior debut ====
With the 2020–21 figure skating season having to deal with the COVID-19 pandemic, senior skaters were invited to a maximum of one Grand Prix event, based largely on geographic location. Chen was invited to the 2020 Cup of China, where he finished in third place behind Jin Boyang and Yan Han.

==== 2021–22 season: Senior international debut ====
Chen began the season by competing at the 2021 Asian Open Trophy, where he finished ninth.

Although assigned to compete at the 2021 Cup of China as his Grand Prix event of the season, the event was cancelled. He would ultimately be reassigned to its replacement event, the 2021 Gran Premio d'Italia, where he finished in tenth place.

==== 2022–23 season: First Chinese national title ====
Chen, still being age-eligible for the junior grand prix circuit, was assigned to the Solidarity Cup 2022, where he finished in second place. Chen was assigned to compete in the junior and senior levels in the 2022 Asian Open Figure Skating Trophy. He finished first at both levels. Having met the minimum technical score requirements, Chen was entered to compete at the 2023 Four Continents Championships.

After winning his first national title at the 2023 Chinese Championships, he went on to compete at the 2023 Four Continents Championships, where he finished fifteenth. At the 2023 World Junior Championships, he placed fourteenth after the short program, but had a strong free skate, finishing fifth in the segment and eighth overall.

==== 2023–24 season ====
Chen started the season by competing on the 2023–24 ISU Junior Grand Prix circuit, placing seventh at 2023 JGP Hungary. Going on to compete at 2023 JGP Poland, Chen placed fourth in the short program. During the free skate, Chen had a hard fall on the opening triple axel, seemingly injuring himself as he began limping after getting up. Despite this, Chen continued his free skate, making several mistakes throughout the program. He would place twenty-second in that competition segment and would drop to seventeenth place overall.

At the 2024 Chinese Junior Championships, Chen won the silver medal behind Tian Tonghe but would go on to win gold at the senior-level championships. Going on to compete on the junior level of the 2024 Chinese National Winter Games.

He would then close his season by finishing ninth at the 2024 Four Continents Championships in Shanghai.

==== 2024–25 season ====
In early October 2024, it was announced that Chen had left longtime coach, Li Wei and had started training under Dan Fang. He went on to start the season by finishing sixth at the 2024 Shanghai Trophy and eleventh at the 2024 Cup of China. One week later, Chen would win his third consecutive national title at the 2025 Chinese Championships.

In February, Chen competed at the 2025 Asian Winter Games in Harbin, where he finished in seventh place. One week later, he placed seventeenth at the 2025 Four Continents Championships in Seoul, South Korea.

==== 2025–26 season ====
Chen opened the season by finishing fourth at the 2025 Asian Open Trophy and fifth at the 2025 CS Denis Ten Memorial Challenge.

In December, he won the silver medal at the 2026 Chinese Championships behind Jin Boyang.

In January, Chen competed at the 2026 Four Continents Championships held in Beijing. He placed tenth in the short program with a new personal best of 79.66 points and thirteenth in the free skate with 144.02 points, finishing eleventh overall.

In March, Chen completed his season at the 2026 World Championships. He placed twenty-second in the short program and seventeenth in the free skate, finishing sixteenth overall.

== Programs ==
Season	Short program	Free skating	Exhibition
2026–2027	Devil May Cry by Apashe & Sofiane Pamart choreo. by Misha Ge	Evolving Sound by Chris Davey; Selection by Joni Fuller and Power-Haus; Music by Eternal Eclipse choreo. by Shae-Lynn Bourne	
2025–2026	Devil May Cry by Apashe & Sofiane Pamart choreo. by Misha Ge	Dynasties Clash by Or Chausha & Yaniv Barmeli; Oogway Ascends (from Kung Fu Panda) by Hans Zimmer; Roman Boots by Or Chausha choreo. by Shae-Lynn Bourne	
2024–2025	Lose Control by Teddy Swims choreo. by Nadia Kanaeva	Dynasties Clash by Or Chausha & Yaniv Barmeli; Oogway Ascends (from Kung Fu Panda) by Hans Zimmer; Roman Boots by Or Chausha choreo. by Shae-Lynn Bourne	No Man No Cry (Jimmy Sax version) by Oliver Koletzki & Jimmy Sax choreo. by Nadia Kanaeva
2023–2024	Hope by NF choreo. by Nadia Kanaeva	Merry Christmas, Mr. Lawrence (from Merry Christmas, Mr. Lawrence); The Last Emperor; Where is Armo?; Rain (from The Last Emperor) by Ryuichi Sakamoto choreo. by Shae-Lynn Bourne	No Man No Cry (Jimmy Sax version) by Oliver Koletzki & Jimmy Sax choreo. by Nadia Kanaeva
2022–2023	Yearning for Peace; Swift Sword (from Hero) by Tan Dun choreo. by Shae-Lynn Bourne	Micmacs; Du Plomb Dans La Cervelle; Et Eustache; Droit de Cite; Ca Deroule by Raphaël Beau and Max Steiner choreo. by Elvin Wong	
2021–2022	Yearning for Peace; Swift Sword (from Hero) by Tan Dun choreo. by Shae-Lynn Bourne	The Grand Budapest Hotel; The Family Desgoffe Und Taxis; Last Will and Testament; Canto at Gabelmeister's Peak; Moonshine by Alexandre Desplat choreo. by Shae-Lynn Bourne	
2020–2021	Canned Heat by Jamiroquai choreo. by Elvin Wong	Micmacs; Du Plomb Dans La Cervelle; Et Eustache; Droit de Cite; Ca Deroule by Raphaël Beau and Max Steiner choreo. by Elvin Wong	
2019–2020	No Man No Cry (Jimmy Sax version) by Oliver Koletzki & Jimmy Sax choreo. by Nadia Kanaeva	Tristan & Iseult by Maxime Rodriguez choreo. by Nadia Kanaeva	
2018–2019	No Man No Cry (Jimmy Sax version) by Oliver Koletzki & Jimmy Sax choreo. by Nadia Kanaeva	Rhapsody in Blue by George Gershwin choreo. by Nadia Kanaeva	

== Competitive highlights ==
- GP – Event of the ISU Grand Prix Series
- JGP – Event of the ISU Junior Grand Prix Series
- CS – Event of the ISU Challenger Series
- TBD – Assigned
- WD – Withdrew from competition

Competition placements at senior level
Season	2020–21	2021–22	2022–23	2023–24	2024–25	2025–26	2026-27
World Championships						16th	
Four Continents Championships			15th	9th	17th	11th	
Chinese Championships			1st	1st	1st	2nd	
GP Cup of China	3rd				11th		9th
GP Italy		10th					
CS Denis Ten Memorial						5th	6th
Asian Games					7th		
Asian Open Trophy		9th	1st			4th	
Shanghai Trophy					6th		

Competition placements at junior level
Season	2015–16	2016–17	2017–18	2018–19	2019–20	2022–23	2023–24
Winter Youth Olympics					6th		
World Junior Championships				25th		8th	
Chinese Championships (Senior)	13th	4th	4th				
Chinese Championships (Junior)					1st	1st	2nd
JGP France					9th		
JGP Hungary							7th
JGP Italy					6th		
JGP Poland						2nd	18th
Alpen Trophy				2nd			
Asian Open Trophy					1st	1st	
Golden Spin of Zagreb				2nd			
National Winter Games							1st
Russian–Chinese Winter Youth Games				3rd			

== Detailed results ==
ISU personal best scores in the +5/-5 GOE System
Segment	Type	Score	Event
Total	TSS	237.70	2025 CS Denis Ten Memorial Challenge
Short program	TSS	80.74	2026 Cup of China
Short program	TES	44.54	2026 Cup of China
Short program	PCS	36.20	2026 Cup of China
Free skating	TSS	161.29	2025 CS Denis Ten Memorial Challenge
Free skating	TES	86.53	2025 CS Denis Ten Memorial Challenge
Free skating	PCS	74.76	2025 CS Denis Ten Memorial Challenge

=== Senior level ===
Results in the 2015–16 season
Date	Event	SP		FS		Total	
Date	Event	P	Score	P	Score	P	Score
Dec 26–27, 2015	(China) 2016 Chinese Championships	11	52.23	13	107.40	13	159.63

Results in the 2016–17 season
Date	Event	SP		FS		Total	
Date	Event	P	Score	P	Score	P	Score
Dec 24–25, 2016	(China) 2017 Chinese Championships	4	57.69	4	120.81	4	178.50

Results in the 2017–18 season
Date	Event	SP		FS		Total	
Date	Event	P	Score	P	Score	P	Score
Dec 23–24, 2017	(China) 2018 Chinese Championships	2	67.38	4	133.89	4	201.27

Results in the 2020–21 season
Date	Event	SP		FS		Total	
Date	Event	P	Score	P	Score	P	Score
Nov 6–8, 2020	2020 Cup of China	3	75.74	3	150.47	3	226.21

Results in the 2021–22 season
Date	Event	SP		FS		Total	
Date	Event	P	Score	P	Score	P	Score
Oct 13–17, 2021	(China) 2021 Asian Open Trophy	7	66.37	10	81.98	9	148.35
Nov 5–7, 2021	(Italy) 2021 Gran Premio d'Italia	8	78.79	10	122.17	10	200.96

Results in the 2022–23 season
Date	Event	SP		FS		Total	
Date	Event	P	Score	P	Score	P	Score
Sep 7–9, 2022	(Indonesia) 2022 Asian Open Trophy	1	66.19	1	139.52	1	204.82
Jan 11–13, 2023	(China) 2023 Chinese Championships	2	68.77	1	124.23	1	193.00
Feb 7–12, 2023	(United States) 2023 Four Continents Championships	15	67.93	16	116.48	15	184.41

Results in the 2023–24 season
Date	Event	SP		FS		Total	
Date	Event	P	Score	P	Score	P	Score
Dec 22–24, 2023	(China) 2024 Chinese Championships	1	79.03	1	141.03	1	220.06
Jan 30 – Feb 4, 2024	(China) 2024 Four Continents Championships	9	78.74	13	139.92	9	218.66

Results in the 2024–25 season
Date	Event	SP		FS		Total	
Date	Event	P	Score	P	Score	P	Score
Oct 3–5, 2024	(China) 2024 Shanghai Trophy	5	77.97	6	144.36	6	222.33
Nov 22–24, 2024	2024 Cup of China	8	77.73	11	104.87	11	182.60
Nov 28 – Dec 1, 2024	(China) 2025 Chinese Championships	3	71.94	1	155.53	1	227.47
Feb 11–13, 2025	(China) 2025 Asian Winter Games	7	67.52	7	135.80	7	203.32
Feb 19–23, 2025	(South Korea) 2025 Four Continents Championships	14	67.45	18	116.21	17	183.66

Results in the 2025–26 season
Date	Event	SP		FS		Total	
Date	Event	P	Score	P	Score	P	Score
Aug 1–5, 2025	(Philippines) 2025 Asian Open Trophy	3	64.30	4	127.62	4	191.92
Oct 1–4, 2025	(Kazakhstan) 2025 CS Denis Ten Memorial Challenge	8	76.41	5	161.29	5	237.70
Dec 25–28, 2025	(China) 2026 Chinese Championships	3	78.11	2	178.32	2	256.43
Jan 21-25, 2026	(China) 2026 Four Continents Championships	10	79.66	13	144.02	11	223.68
Mar 24–29, 2026	(Czech Republic) 2026 World Championships	22	74.36	17	150.66	16	225.02

Results in the 2026–27 season
Date	Event	SP		FS		Total	
Date	Event	P	Score	P	Score	P	Score
October 8–11 2026	(Kazakhstan) 2026 CS Denis Ten Memorial Challenge	8	64.19	6	132.41	6	196.60

=== Junior level ===
Results in the 2018–19 season
Date	Event	SP		FS		Total	
Date	Event	P	Score	P	Score	P	Score
Nov 12–18, 2018	(Austria) 2018 Alpen Trophy	1	63.94	2	115.26	2	179.20
Dec 5–8, 2018	(Croatia) 2018 Golden Spin of Zagreb	2	60.63	2	105.62	2	166.25
Dec 14–18, 2018	(Russia) 2018 Russian–Chinese Winter Youth Games	3	68.61	3	127.13	3	195.74
Mar 4–10, 2019	(Croatia) 2019 World Junior Championships	25	60.06	–	–	25	60.06

Results in the 2019–20 season
Date	Event	SP		FS		Total	
Date	Event	P	Score	P	Score	P	Score
Aug 21–24, 2019	2019 JGP France	7	62.79	9	112.88	9	175.67
Sep 10–15, 2019	(China) 2020 Chinese Championships (Junior)	1	66.67	1	113.52	1	180.19
Oct 2–5, 2019	2019 JGP Italy	9	64.93	5	140.23	6	205.16
Oct 30 – Nov 1, 2019	(China) 2019 Asian Open Trophy	1	58.48	1	109.31	1	167.79
Jan 10–15, 2020	(Switzerland) 2020 Winter Youth Olympics	10	57.31	6	127.29	6	184.60

Results in the 2022–23 season
Date	Event	SP		FS		Total	
Date	Event	P	Score	P	Score	P	Score
Sep 28 – Oct 1, 2022	2022 JGP Poland I	16	53.76	1	148.08	2	201.84
Dec 7–9, 2022	(Indonesia) 2022 Asian Open Trophy	1	65.30	1	139.52	1	204.82
Dec 25–31, 2022	(China) 2022 Chinese Championships (Junior)	1	66.60	1	124.14	1	190.74
Feb 27 – Mar 5, 2023	(Canada) 2023 World Junior Championships	14	65.93	5	139.19	8	205.12

Results in the 2023–24 season
Date	Event	SP		FS		Total	
Date	Event	P	Score	P	Score	P	Score
Sep 20–23, 2023	2023 JGP Hungary	6	62.03	7	116.85	7	178.88
Sep 27–30, 2023	2023 JGP Poland	4	63.51	22	71.41	18	134.92
Nov 25–26, 2023	(China) 2023 Chinese Championships (Junior)	3	68.61	2	139.37	2	207.98
Jan 18–19, 2024	(China) 14th Chinese National Winter Games	1	68.08	1	144.90	1	212.98
