= Jiang Yibing =

Chinese figure skater

Personal information
- Full name: Jiang Yibing
- Other names: Jennifer Jiang
- Born: February 17, 1970 (age 56)

Figure skating career
- Country: China

Jiang Yibing (born February 17, 1970) is a Chinese figure skater. She represented China at the 1988 Winter Olympics, where she placed 25th. She also competed at the 1985 World Figure Skating Championships, where she placed 23rd. Following her retirement from competitive skating, she served as an international and ISU Judge, and as an ISU Technical Specialist for China.

After coaching for many years in China, she moved to Canada and began coaching there in March 2007 under the name Jennifer Jiang. She began coaching Mira Leung in 2008. Jiang started coaching at Sunset Skating Club in Vancouver, BC, Canada in 2008, and became the Skating Director at the club since 2014.

== Results ==
Event	1984-85	1985-86	1986-87	1987-88
Winter Olympic Games				25th
World Championships	23rd			
NHK Trophy		10th	6th	9th
Chinese Championships		2nd		
