= Juri Osada =

Japanese figure skater

Personal information
- Other names: Juri Ozawa

Figure skating career
- Country: Japan
Medal record
Ladies' figure skating
Representing Japan
Asian Winter Games
Gold medal – first place	1986 Sapporo	Ladies' singles

Juri Osada (長田 樹里, Osada Juri) (née Ozawa) is a Japanese figure skater who is now a coach. She won the 1983 Japan Figure Skating Championships and 1986 Winter Asian Games, 1985 Winter Universiade.

== Early career ==
Osada showed much promise as a young skater in her mid-teen years. Osada participated in her first international competition as an alternate for another skater, Megumi Aotani, at 1980 Enia Challenge Cup in the Netherlands at the age of 15. There, she landed three triples, a Salchow, a toe loop, and a loop in her free skate, which equaled or exceeded the difficulty of the top male skaters back then. Although her poor standings in compulsories caused her to place 6th overall, she received the special Rookie Award alongside Poland's 14-year-old Grzegorz Filipowski. Then, in October 1982, Osada placed a close 2nd behind Midori Ito at All Japan Free Championships in Kobe, which was followed by a surprise 4th-place finish at the NHK Trophy in Tokyo, where she placed behind Katarina Witt, Rosalynn Sumners, and Tiffany Chin while finishing ahead of world medalists such as Claudia Leistner and Elizabeth Manley.

After winning the All Japan Figure Skating Championships in January 1983, Osada was sent to the World Championships in Helsinki in March 1983. There, she made a series of errors in compulsories, in which she placed a disappointing 24th. In her short program, she missed the triple loop jump in her combination, which only allowed her to pull up to 21st after this segment of the competition. Due to the new rule instituted in the 1982–1983 season (which, incidentally, was abolished after that season), Osada was unable to skate her free program in "Group A," or the main competition consisting of those who placed 15th or above after short program. Instead, she was placed in "Group B" and won the free skate, which resulted in the 3rd-place finish in "Group B"--or 18th overall.

Osada's placement there was noted in ISU's decision not to continue this dual-grouping policy, because her scores in free skating would have placed her 7th in "Group A" in that segment, which would have placed her significantly higher overall. However, she was never given the opportunity to place above 16th in free skate, due to her placement in "Group B." By contrast, many strong compulsory figure skaters who were poor free skaters ended up placing high in the end, because they were guaranteed at least a 15th-place finish in free skating, as long as they placed in the top 15 after short program.

== Later career ==
Given the way Osada skated in the 1982–1983 season, many expected her to continue to progress in the world ranks. However, she placed poorly in compulsories at 1983–1984 All Japan Championships, where she finished 4th, costing her the opportunity to compete at the Sarajevo Olympics in 1984. Around this time, Osada experienced a growth spurt, which made her triple jumps less consistent and less dynamic. Although she won a couple of bronze medals at NHK Trophy, she was never able to regain her national title, nor was she able to make the Japanese world or Olympics team. By 1986, she was no longer training seriously, as she shifted her focus to her studies at Hosei University. She retired quietly after the 1989 season.

== Competitive highlights ==
International
Event	81–82	82–83	83–84	84–85	85–86	86–87	87–88
World Champ.		13th					
NHK Trophy		4th		3rd	3rd	3rd	4th
Prague Skate	2nd						
Asian Games					1st		
Universiade				1st			
National
Japan Champ.		1st			3rd		
