= Ho Kang =

North Korean figure skater

Personal information
- Nationality: North Korean
- Born: 8 April 1975 (age 49)

Sport
- Sport: Figure skating

Ho Kang (born 8 April 1975) is a North Korean figure skater. He competed in the men's singles event at the 1988 Winter Olympics.
