= Masako Kato =

Japanese figure skater

Personal information
- Born: August 6, 1965 (age 61) Tokyo, Japan
- Height: 1.59 m (5 ft 2 1/2 in)

Figure skating career
- Country: Japan
- Retired: 1987
Medal record
Ladies' figure skating
Representing Japan
Asian Winter Games
Silver medal – second place	1986 Sapporo	Ladies' singles

Japanese name
- Kanji: 加藤雅子
- Kana: かとう まさこ
Transcriptions
- Romanization: Katō Masako

Masako Kato (加藤 雅子, Katō Masako; born August 6, 1965) is a Japanese former competitive figure skater. She is the 1986 Asian Winter Games silver medalist and 1984 Japanese national champion. She placed 19th at the 1984 Winter Olympics.

== Results ==
International
Event	79–80	80–81	81–82	82–83	83–84	84–85	85–86	86–87
Olympics					19th			
Worlds		21st				18th		
NHK Trophy	8th		13th	10th		8th	8th	
Asian Games							2nd	
Prague Skate								5th
National
Japan			2nd		1st	2nd		2nd
