= Zhao Jun (skier) =

Chinese cross-country skier

Personal information
- Nationality: Chinese
- Born: 21 February 1967 (age 58)

Sport
- Sport: Cross-country skiing

Zhao Jun (born 21 February 1967) is a Chinese cross-country skier. He competed in the men's 15 kilometre classical event at the 1988 Winter Olympics.
