= Fu Caishu =

Chinese figure skater

Fu Caishu (born 12 November 1967) is a Chinese former competitive figure skater. She is the 1986 Fujifilm Trophy silver medalist and 1986 Asian Winter Games bronze medalist. She competed at the 1982 and 1983 World Junior Championships. After retiring from competition, she became a skating coach. She taught Zhu Qiuying and Yang Zhixue in Harbin. She has also coached Jin Boyang.

== Competitive highlights ==
International
Event	81–82	82–83	83–84	84–85	85–86	86–87
Asian Games					3rd	
Fujifilm Trophy						2nd
NHK Trophy				11th		
International: Junior
Junior Worlds	23rd	19th				
National
Chinese Champ.					1st	
