= Elizaveta Stekolnikova =

Kazakhstani ice dancer (born 1974)

Personal information
- Born: April 20, 1974 (age 52) Moscow, Russian SFSR, Soviet Union

Figure skating career
- Country: Kazakhstan
- Retired: 1999
Medal record
Figure skating: Ice dancing
Representing Kazakhstan
Asian Winter Games
Gold medal – first place	1996 Harbin	Ice dancing

Elizaveta Stekolnikova (Елизавета Юрьевна Стекольникова, born April 20, 1974) is a former ice dancer who competed internationally for the Soviet Union with Oleg Ovsyannikov for one season and then for Kazakhstan. With partner Dmitri Kazarlyga, she is the 1994 Skate America bronze medalist, 1995 Winter Universiade bronze medalist, and 1996 Asian Winter Games champion. They placed 18th at the 1994 Winter Olympics and 22nd at the 1998 Winter Olympics.

Stekolnikova teamed up with Kazarlyga in Moscow and trained with him in the United States under Natalia Dubova. Their partnership ended in 1998.

Stekolnikova teamed up with American skater Mark Fitzgerald for one season. They competed at both the Four Continents and the World Championships. After retiring from competition, she began working as a coach in Ontario, Canada.

== Results ==
GP: Champions Series (Grand Prix)

=== With Ovsyannikov ===
Event	1989–90
Golden Spin of Zagreb	1st

=== With Kazarlyga ===
International
Event	92–93	93–94	94–95	95–96	96–97	97–98
Winter Olympics		18th				22nd
World Champ.	19th	14th	13th	12th	15th	22nd
GP Skate America				4th	WD	
GP Skate Canada				5th		6th
GP Nations Cup					6th	
GP NHK Trophy				4th		6th
Asian Winter Games				1st		
NHK Trophy		6th	7th			
Schäfer Memorial						7th
Skate America			3rd			
Skate Israel				3rd		
Winter Universiade			3rd			

=== With Fitzgerald ===
International
Event	1998–99
World Championships	27th
Four Continents Championships	8th
