= Dmitri Kazarlyga =

Kazakhstani-American figure skater (born 1971)

Personal information
- Born: July 12, 1971 (age 55)

Figure skating career
- Country: Kazakhstan
- Retired: 1998
Medal record
Figure skating: Ice dancing
Representing Kazakhstan
Asian Winter Games
Gold medal – first place	1996 Harbin	Ice dancing

Dmitri Kazarlyga (born July 12, 1971) is a former ice dancer who competed internationally for Kazakhstan. With partner Elizaveta Stekolnikova, he is the 1994 Skate America bronze medalist, 1995 Winter Universiade bronze medalist, and 1996 Asian Winter Games champion. They placed 18th at the 1994 Winter Olympics and 22nd at the 1998 Winter Olympics.

Early in his career, Kazarlyga skated with Kuralai Tilebaldinova (Uzurova) in Almaty. He teamed up with Stekolnikova after moving to Moscow and trained with her in the United States under Natalia Dubova. Their partnership ended in 1998.

Kazarlyga has worked as a coach in Massachusetts. He coached Jessica Huot / Juha Valkama.

== Results ==
GP: Champions Series (Grand Prix)

with Stekolnikova

International
Event	92–93	93–94	94–95	95–96	96–97	97–98
Winter Olympics		18th				22nd
World Champ.	19th	14th	13th	12th	15th	22nd
GP Skate America				4th	WD	
GP Skate Canada				5th		6th
GP Nations Cup					6th	
GP NHK Trophy				4th		6th
Asian Winter Games				1st		
NHK Trophy		6th	7th			
Schäfer Memorial						7th
Skate America			3rd			
Skate Israel				3rd		
Winter Universiade			3rd			
WD = Withdrew
