= Figure skating at the 1996 Asian Winter Games =

- Venue: Heilongjiang Multifunctional Hall

Figure skating at the 1996 Winter Asian Games took place in the city of Harbin, China with four events contested. This edition of the Winter Asiad marks the return of the sport after a ten-year absence. The previous Asian Winter Games were held in Sapporo, Japan.

== Medalists ==
Event	Gold	Silver	Bronze
Men's singles	Guo Zhengxin; China	Zhang Min; China	Li Xia; China
Women's singles	Chen Lu; China	Tatiana Malinina; Uzbekistan	Fumie Suguri; Japan
Pairs	China; Zhao Hongbo; Shen Xue	Kazakhstan; Andrey Kryukov; Marina Khalturina	China; Liu Bingyang; Sun Bao
Ice dance	Kazakhstan; Dmitriy Kazarlyga; Elizaveta Stekolnikova	Japan; Hiroshi Tanaka; Aya Kawai	China; Cao Xianming; Zhang Weina

== Medal table ==
Rank	Nation	Gold	Silver	Bronze	Total
1	China (CHN)	3	1	3	7
2	Kazakhstan (KAZ)	1	1	0	2
3	Japan (JPN)	0	1	1	2
4	Uzbekistan (UZB)	0	1	0	1
Totals (4 entries)		4	4	4	12
