= Hiroshi Tanaka (figure skater) =

Japanese figure skater and coach

Personal information
- Born: May 29, 1972 (age 54) Tokyo, Japan

Figure skating career
- Country: Japan
- Retired: 1998
Medal record
Figure skating
Ice dancing
Representing Japan
Asian Winter Games
Silver medal – second place	1996 Harbin	Ice dancing

Japanese name
- Kanji: 田中 衆史
- Kana: たなか ひろし
Transcriptions
- Romanization: Tanaka Hiroshi

Hiroshi Tanaka (田中 衆史, Tanaka Hiroshi; born May 29, 1972 in Yokohama, Japan) is a Japanese figure skating coach and former competitor. He competed in Ice Dancing with Aya Kawai and Kayo Shirahata. Tanaka and Kawai placed 23rd in the 1998 Winter Olympic Games. They were two-time Japanese national champions.

== Results ==
GP: Champions Series / Grand Prix

=== With Kawai ===
International
Event	94–95	95–96	96–97	97–98
Winter Olympics				23rd
World Championships	26th		22nd	28th
GP Nations Cup			12th	10th
GP NHK Trophy		8th	10th	10th
GP Trophée Lalique			12th	
Asian Winter Games		2nd		
NHK Trophy	9th			
National
Japan Championships	2nd	2nd	1st	1st

=== With Shirahata ===
International
Event	88–89	89–90	90–91	91–92	92–93
World Championships					25th
NHK Trophy					10th
National
Japan Championships	3rd	3rd	3rd		1st
