= Makoto Kano (figure skater) =

Japanese figure skater

Personal information
- Born: October 16, 1966 (age 60) Osaka Prefecture, Japan
- Height: 1.76 m (5 ft 9 1/2 in)

Figure skating career
- Country: Japan
- Retired: 1989
Medal record
Men's figure skating
Representing Japan
Asian Winter Games
Gold medal – first place	1986 Sapporo	Men's singles

Japanese name
- Kanji: 加納誠
- Kana: かのう まこと
Transcriptions
- Romanization: Makoto Kanō

Makoto Kano (加納 誠, Kano Makoto; born October 16, 1966) is a Japanese former figure skater. He is the 1986 Asian Winter Games champion, the 1989 Winter Universiade champion, and a two-time Japanese national champion. He placed 17th at the 1988 Winter Olympics.

== Results ==
International
Event	81–82	82–83	83–84	84–85	85–86	86–87	87–88	88–89
Olympics							17th	
Worlds						11th	WD	11th
Skate America								9th
Fujifilm Trophy							3rd	
Int. de Paris								4th
NHK Trophy	8th	7th		7th	8th	2nd	3rd	5th
Prague Skate		3rd						
Golden Spin			3rd					
Universiade								1st
Asian Games					1st			
National
Japan Champ.			3rd	2nd	2nd	2nd	1st	1st
WD = Withdrew
