= Jin Boyang =

Chinese figure skater (born 1997)

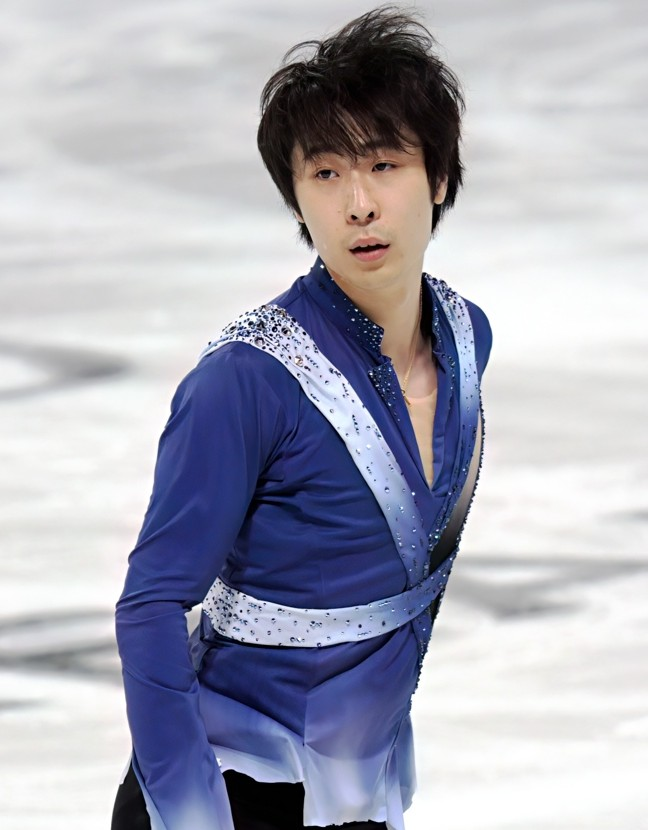
- Jin Boyang at the 2024 Grand Prix de France

Personal information
- Native name: 金博洋
- Full name: Jin Boyang
- Born: 3 October 1997 (age 29) Harbin, China
- Home town: Beijing, China
- Height: 1.71 m (5 ft 7 in)

Figure skating career
- Country: China
- Discipline: Men's singles
- Coach: Brian Orser; Tracy Wilson; Xu Zhaoxiao
- Began skating: 2003
- Competitive: 2010–present
- Highest WS: 7th (2016–17)

Medal record
| Event | Gold medal – first place | Silver medal – second place | Bronze medal – third place |
| World Championships | 0 | 0 | 2 |
| Four Continents Championships | 1 | 2 | 0 |
| Chinese Championships | 6 | 0 | 1 |
| World Junior Championships | 0 | 1 | 0 |
| Junior Grand Prix Final | 1 | 0 | 0 |
Medal list
World Championships
| Bronze medal – third place | 2016 Boston | Singles |
| Bronze medal – third place | 2017 Helsinki | Singles |
Four Continents Championships
| Gold medal – first place | 2018 Taipei | Singles |
| Silver medal – second place | 2016 Taipei | Singles |
| Silver medal – second place | 2019 Anaheim | Singles |
Chinese Championships
| Gold medal – first place | 2014 Changchun | Singles |
| Gold medal – first place | 2015 Changchun | Singles |
| Gold medal – first place | 2016 Harbin | Singles |
| Gold medal – first place | 2017 Jilin City | Singles |
| Gold medal – first place | 2019 Harbin | Singles |
| Gold medal – first place | 2025 Harbin | Singles |
| Bronze medal – third place | 2013 Harbin | Singles |
World Junior Championships
| Silver medal – second place | 2015 Tallinn | Singles |
Junior Grand Prix Final
| Gold medal – first place | 2013–14 Fukuoka | Singles |

Jin Boyang (Chinese: 金博洋; pinyin: Jīn Bóyáng; Mandarin pronunciation: [tɕín pwǒ jǎŋ]; born 3 October 1997) is a Chinese figure skater. He is a two-time World bronze medalist (2016–2017), the 2018 Four Continents champion, a two-time Four Continents silver medalist (2016, 2019), the 2017 Asian Winter Games silver medalist, a six-time Chinese national champion (2014–2017, 2019, 2025) and a two-time (2016, 2024) Chinese national winter games champion. On the junior level, he is the 2015 World Junior silver medalist and the 2013 JGP Final champion. He is the first Chinese skater to medal in the men's singles event at a World Championships.

Jin is the first skater ever to land a quad Lutz-triple toe loop combination in competition, the first skater to ever have landed three different types of quads in a single competition, the first skater to have landed four quad jumps in a single program in international competition, and the first skater to have landed six quads in international competition. He is credited as being one of the people who fueled the "revolution" based around quadruple jumps in figure skating.

He also represented China at the 2018, 2022, and 2026 Winter Olympics.

== Personal life ==
Jin was born on 3 October 1997, in Harbin, China. His parents formerly competed in middle to long-distance running. Jin enrolled at the Harbin Institute of Physical Education in 2013. In 2019, he enrolled for a Master's Degree at Beijing Sport University. His family name Jin (金) means "gold", and he is called "Golden Boy" by some media sources.

He likes pets, electronics, music, the internet, remote-controlled cars, car racing, and collecting shoes. He enjoys go-karting, motorcycling, and skiing but avoids them to prevent injury.

== Career ==
=== Early years ===
Jin started skating at age seven and a half, having become interested in the activity when he attended one of Shen Xue and Zhao Hongbo's ice shows. His first coach was Wang Junxiang. He took ballet, Latin dances, jazz, and street dance classes before he started focusing on competitive skating. At first, his parents opposed the idea of a career in figure skating, because he was good at school at the time. However, he began to demonstrate his talents in skating, especially with dance movements, during his second year of primary school, and his parents started to support him.

At the age of 11, he started focusing on jumps, and by 2009–10, at the age of 12 or 13, he had landed five triple jumps. He landed his first triple Axel in May 2010. He landed his first quadruple toe loop at the age of 14, and his first quadruple Salchow at the age of 15. The first time he succeeded in jumping the quadruple Lutz in practice was in 2013.

=== Junior career ===
==== 2011–12 season ====
Jin won the junior division of the Asian Open Trophy 2011 by "a landslide". He earned a total of 177.17 points; if he were competing in the senior men's division, he would have come in second place. His feet were so small that he had to wear girls' skates with black boot covers because there were no men's skating boots in his size.

==== 2012–2013 season: Junior Grand Prix debut ====
Jin debuted on the Junior Grand Prix (JGP) series in the 2012–2013 season. After taking gold in France and silver in Slovenia, he finished fifth at the JGP Final, held in Sochi, Russia. He won a bronze medal at the 2013 Chinese Championships, and placed fourth at the 2013 World Junior Championships in Milan, Italy.

==== 2013–2014 season: Junior Grand Prix Final gold and first senior National title ====
In the 2013–14 JGP series, Jin won his assignments in Latvia and Estonia. He qualified for the JGP Final in Fukuoka, Japan, where he placed fifth in the short program but rebounded in the free skate with three quads and six clean triples. He won the gold overall and stated he was "very happy" to skate well. Jin won his first senior national title at the 2014 Chinese Championships. He finished sixth at the 2014 World Junior Championships in Sofia, Bulgaria.

==== 2014–2015 season: Silver medal at Junior Worlds ====
Jin won both of his Junior Grand Prix events in Slovenia and Japan, and was the top qualifier for the Junior Grand Prix Final held in Barcelona, Spain, as the only skater to win both of his events. He placed second after the short program. However, a fifth-place free skate left him in fourth overall. He won his second national title at the 2015 Chinese Championships. Jin concluded his season with a silver medal at the 2015 World Junior Championships in Tallinn, Estonia, having placed fifth in the short program and first in the free skate.

=== Senior career ===
==== 2015–2016 season: Senior international debut and bronze medal at Worlds ====
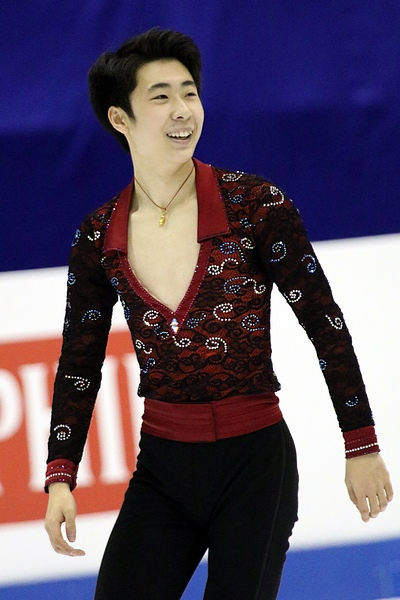
Jin at the 2016 Four Continents Championships

A video of Jin landing a quadruple Lutz-triple toe loop combination in practice circulated during the summer. At a national event early in the season, Jin completed this jumping pass in his short program and landed four quadruple jumps in his free skate, although with a step-out on the quad Lutz. He landed a total of six quadruple jumps during the competition.

Jin received two 2015 Grand Prix assignments. At the 2015 Cup of China, he won the silver medal behind reigning World champion Javier Fernández. He became the first person to ever land a quad Lutz-triple toe combination in competition and also the first to land a quad lutz with a positive grade of execution (GOE) in international competition. Jin was also the first person to attempt four quadruple jumps in one program. He set a record for the most points scored on one element, with the jump combination in the short program scoring 19.19 points.

At the 2015 NHK Trophy, Jin took silver behind reigning Olympic champion Yuzuru Hanyu. Hanyu stated after the competition "When I look at the future of figure skating (and quads), I see Boyang". Jin thus qualified for the 2015 Grand Prix Final in Barcelona, where he finished fifth. At the 13th National Winter Games of China, he represented the city of Harbin and finished first in both short program and free skate, completing all of his planned quadruple jumps.

Making his Four Continents debut in Taipei, Jin landed a total of six quadruple jumps in his programs and achieved new personal bests in his short program, free skate, and combined total scores. With a quad Lutz, quad Salchow, and two quad toe loops in his free skate, he also became the first skater to land three kinds of quads in a single program as well as becoming the first person to land four quads in a single program in international competition, and he ultimately placed second overall behind Canada's Patrick Chan by a narrow difference of 0.38 points.

At the 2016 World Championships in Boston, Jin won the bronze medal and became the first Chinese man to medal in men's singles at the World Championships.

==== 2016–2017 season: Second bronze at Worlds ====
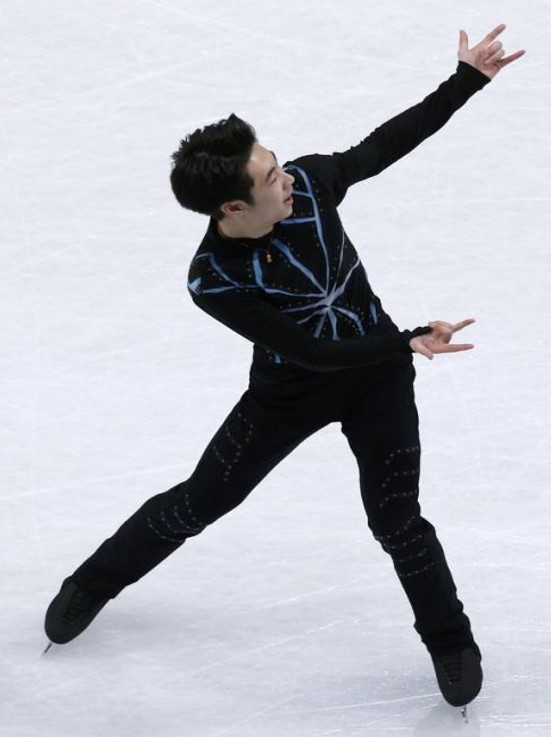
Jin at the 2017 World Championships

After the 2016 World Championships, Jin went to the United States to take footwork classes. He said about these classes "The footwork class was very tiring. During training, I had to squat with a shot put and control the balance of the body with my hands".

Jin placed fifth at the 2016 Skate America and won silver at the 2016 Cup of China. He ranked seventh in the series standings and thus did not qualify for the 2016–2017 Grand Prix Final. Later in the season, at the Chinese National Championships, Jin placed second in the short program but rebounded in the free and was able to win his fourth straight national title. He was assigned to both the 2017 Four Continents Championships and the 2017 Asian Winter Games, where he finished 5th and 2nd, respectively. At the Four Continents Championships, he attempted a quad loop in competition for the first time.

Jin repeated as world bronze medalist at the 2017 World Championships in Helsinki, achieving new personal bests for his short program, free skate, and total score. He received 2.57 GOE for his quad Lutz attempt in the free skate and surpassed a total of 300 points for the first time. Finishing behind Hanyu and Shoma Uno, Jin was a part of the first all-Asian men’s podium at a World Championship. He said that he was "very satisfied" with his performance, calling his repeat bronze medal a "real bronze medal" because he won it based on his own abilities instead of by relying on other skaters making mistakes. Jin's program components score improved by ten points compared to the previous world championships, and he obtained a score of 8.71 in skating skills.

==== 2017–2018 season: First senior international gold and Olympic debut ====
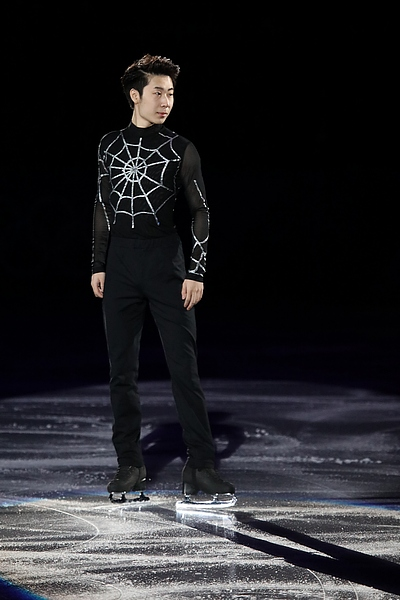
Jin at the 2018 Winter Olympics

Jin had a car accident in August 2017, resulting in left thigh injuries. He started his season at the 2017 CS Finlandia Trophy, where he placed second in the short program and third in the free skate and won the gold medal overall. His Grand Prix assignments for this season were the 2017 Cup of China and 2017 Skate America. Jin said that he had sprained both of his ankles due to loose boot laces, which was confirmed by Zhao Hongbo as having happened before the Cup of China. He placed second at the Cup of China and fourth at Skate America, thereby qualifying for the 2017–18 Grand Prix Final. However, he withdrew from the Grand Prix Final and the Chinese Championships due to the injuries.

At the 2018 Four Continents Championships, Jin surpassed 100 points in the short program, earning a new personal best of 100.17. In the free skate he scored 200.78 points, for an overall score of 300.95, winning his first senior international gold medal at an ISU Championship. His quad Lutz in the free skate received 2.71 GOE, with six judges awarding it maximum GOE, for a total element score of 16.31. He said that he had worked hard on both recovery and training after withdrawing from the Grand Prix Final. Jin added that the result gave him confidence to challenge himself to give two perfect performances in Pyeongchang.

Jin placed fourth at the 2018 Winter Olympics with a new personal best of 103.32 points in the short program, and a total score of 297.77. His placement was the highest of any Chinese athlete competing in men's single skating in Olympic history. At the 2018 World Championships, he placed fourth in the short program but dropped to nineteenth overall after ranking twenty-third in the free skate.

==== 2018–2019 season ====
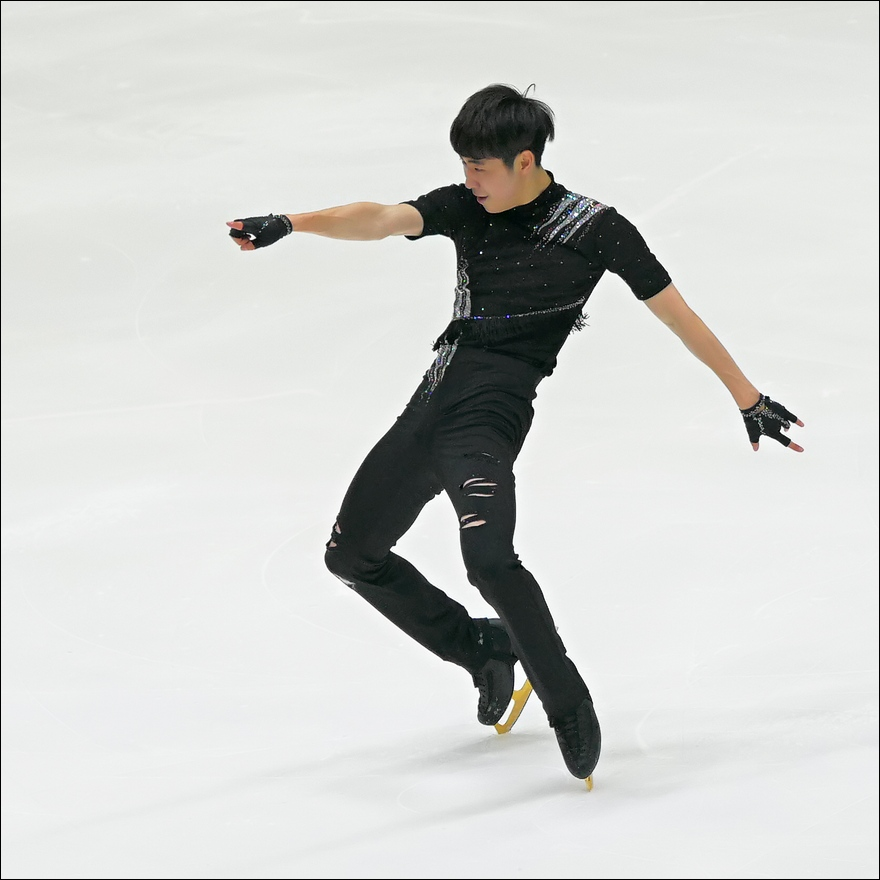
Jin Boyang at the 2018 Grand Prix of Helsinki

Over the summer, it was initially announced that Jin would be moving to train with Brian Orser and Tracy Wilson at the Toronto Cricket, Skating & Curling Club in preparation for the 2022 Winter Olympics in Beijing. However, these plans were subsequently called off, with Shen Xue stating on behalf of the Chinese Skating Association that Jin was "more familiar with the training environment and methods in China." Debuting on the Grand Prix series for the season, Jin placed fifth at the 2018 Grand Prix of Helsinki and ninth at the 2018 Internationaux de France.

In an interview after both of his Grand Prix assignments had concluded, Jin revealed that he had experienced travel-associated difficulties and arrived at both his assignments later than expected. He further stated that he was training at a rink in Beijing, separate from the national team, and that he traveled between Beijing and Harbin whenever he "felt stagnant" and had also hired his own dance teacher. Jin said that he felt more confident after the Olympics and that he and choreographer Lori Nichol worked together to choreograph his programs, with Jin contributing some of his own ideas for the choreography.

After winning the Chinese national title again, he competed at the 2019 Four Continents Championships, where he placed third in the short program and second in the free skate, winning the silver medal overall. Jin stated that he had adjusted himself mentally a little bit.

Finishing the season at the 2019 World Championships in Saitama, Jin placed ninth in the short program after falling on his quad Lutz attempt but rose to fifth overall after a strong free skate. Jin remarked that he needed to continue improving in things like speed, technique, and style. He summarized that his takeaway from the season was he had "finally gained a good feeling in the last few competitions", and that he had tried to skate his best. He added, "I just needed to skate better in my next competition".

==== 2019–2020 season: First senior Grand Prix gold ====
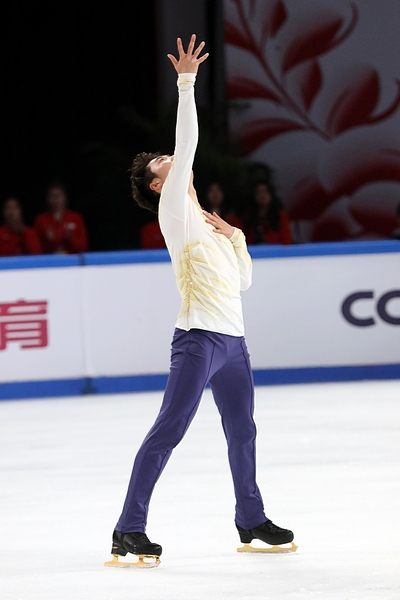
Jin at the 2019 Cup of China

Jin opened his season with a win at the 2019 CS Lombardia Trophy, surpassing 100 points in the short program with 101.09 points and setting a new personal best. He was less successful at the 2019 Shanghai Trophy, placing third with a strong free skate after a weak showing in the short.

At his first Grand Prix assignment, 2019 Skate America, Jin placed ninth in the short program after doubling a planned quad Lutz and falling on his triple Axel. He placed fifth with a stronger free skate and moved up to sixth place overall. At his second Grand Prix, the 2019 Cup of China, Jin again fell on his quad Lutz in the short program and narrowly placed second behind a returning Yan Han. He then won the free skate, landing two quads but doubling a planned quad toe loop. Jin rose to first place overall to win the Cup of China and claim his first ever Grand Prix gold medal.

His performances were enough to qualify for the 2019–20 Grand Prix of Figure Skating Final for the third time in his career, and he was able to attend for the first time since the 2015–16 Grand Prix Final. At the Final, he popped his opening quad Lutz and finished sixth in the short program. He remarked that he went into the quad with too much force, but "not on the right point", and that he had skated quite "tight". Jin fell twice in the free skate but rose to fifth overall. He stated that he had not expected to qualify for the Final and had not adjusted his training properly after the Cup of China. Jin also noted that he was adjusting his skates, which had affected his ability to train. He said that he hoped to learn from the experience and "be more matured mentally" to deliver a stronger performance at his next competition.

At the 2020 Four Continents Championships, Jin landed all his jumps to place second after the short program. In the free skate, he doubled two of his attempted quads, though he successfully landed the quad Lutz again, and dropped to fourth overall. He remarked that, except for the two popped quad jumps, he felt that the rest of his performance was good. Although Jin was assigned to compete at the World Championships in Montreal, these were cancelled as a result of the coronavirus pandemic.

==== 2020–2021 season ====
With the 2020–21 figure skating season having to deal with the COVID-19 pandemic, senior skaters were invited to a maximum of one Grand Prix event, based largely on geographic location. Jin was invited to the 2020 Cup of China. He won the competition with a clean short program and a long program that had the highest technical difficulty of the competitors despite some errors. He challenged himself technically as well as artistically, choosing short program music that had a slower tempo than his previous programs.

Before the 2021 World Championships, Jin's biography was updated to reflect the addition of Brian Orser and Tracy Wilson to his coaching team. Jin finished in twenty-second place at the World Championships. The combined placement of Yan Han and Jin was not enough to qualify more than one spot for the 2022 Winter Olympics.

==== 2021–2022 season: Beijing Olympics ====
During the closed-loop training due to the ongoing pandemic, Jin began to train by himself, because his coach, who suffered from diabetes, was not able to be with him every day. He was assigned to the 2021 Cup of China as his only Grand Prix event of the season. He was noted to be increasing his physical fitness and doing special training according to the "program arranged by the coaching staff and outside experts". After the 2021 Cup of China was cancelled, he was reassigned to its replacement event, the 2021 Gran Premio d'Italia.

He was assigned to participate in the Olympic test event, the 2021 Asian Open Trophy, which took place in mid-October. In early October, before the competition, he contracted appendicitis and decided to put off surgery in favor of conservative treatment so he could compete. At the Asian Open Trophy, Jin won the bronze medal. In November, at the Gran Premio d'Italia, he placed first in the short program in but dropped to seventh place after a problematic free skate.

It was announced that China's competitor in the men's discipline at the Olympics would be decided based on the results of five trials. Jin maintained a lead over Chen Yudong in all five rounds and accumulated enough points to be announced as the Olympic entry for China.

Jin began the Olympic games as the Chinese entry in the men's short program of the Olympic team event. He placed sixth in the segment, securing five points for the Chinese team. After the short programs concluded, Team China qualified for the long program segment with an accumulated 22 points. Jin placed fourth with his free skate, taking another seven points. Team China finished fifth overall after the long programs concluded, with 50 points total.

For the men's event, Jin scored a total of 90.98 points in the short program, finishing in 11th place. He remarked that his team leaders had helped him adjust internally and that it was "great" to skate at such a technical level. In the free skate, Jin set a new personal best technical score of 97.23. He earned a score of 179.45, and a total of 270.43, for an overall finish of 9th place. He finished ninth overall. Jin said that he felt relieved and encouraged for having overcome the ups and downs of the previous four years and that he was in a relaxed state during the competition. He added that he felt he had achieved his goals and shown his best side, which was memorable as an athlete from the host country.

==== 2022–2023 season: Coaching change ====
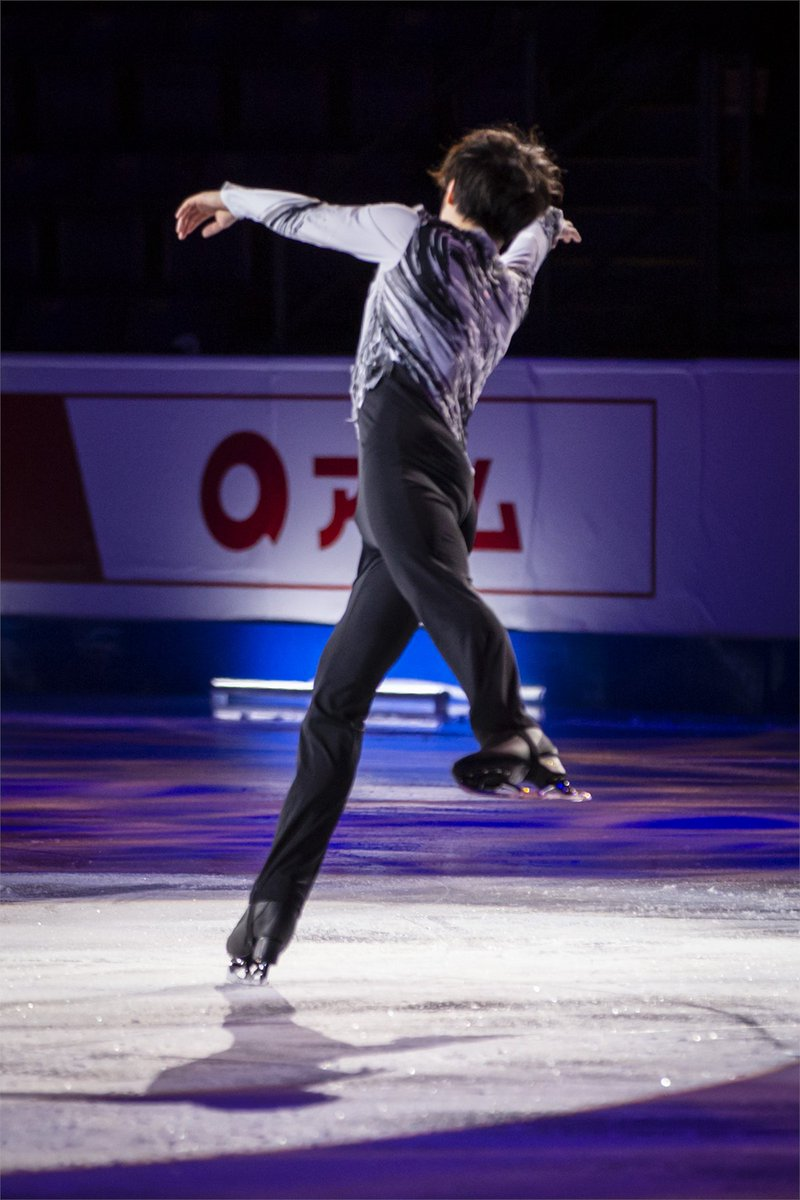
Jin at the 2023 Four Continents Championships

After the Beijing Olympics, Jin's parents wanted him to stop skating, but he personally wanted to continue competing. He said in an interview that he wished to "represent China and let everyone know that there is still a person fighting in men's singles" for "the next four years". He also felt the responsibility to encourage more children to participate in figure skating and make more people love the sport. It was announced that Jin's new coaches would be Brian Orser and Tracy Wilson, after he had been unable to go to Canada for face-to-face coaching with them previously. He was assigned to the 2022 Skate Canada International and 2022 NHK Trophy as his Grand Prix events of the season; however, he withdrew from both events, citing injury.

Jin was unable to complete many jumps in practice during his first months with his new coaching team due to a lack of strength, and his programs were not finished until December. He competed at the 2023 Four Continents Championships, placing fourth in the short program. He revealed that he had continued to struggle with injury and health concerns, including two bouts of COVID in recent months, but that he was enthusiastic about how his new coaching team was managing the situation, calling this "a brand new start." His fast-paced short program to Seven Nation Army had been changed twice because of his condition and recovery, and he started doing full run-throughs only two weeks prior to the competition. He dropped to seventh place after the free skate; he afterward indicated that he had been dealing with pain while at the event that limited his jump practice. The high altitude of Colorado Springs, where the Championships had taken place, also affected him. While Jin had trained at high altitude before, he stated that his stamina had reduced because of the two bouts of COVID.

In an interview after the 2023 Four Continents Championships, he commented that his long program was constructed with the aim of expressing his feelings after moving to Canada for training. David Wilson had recommended several pieces of music before they settled on "This" by Ed Sheeran. Jin said they gradually filled the program with improvised movement, and that unconscious movements he did during training was added to the program later on.

Jin was assigned to skate at the 2023 World Championships, where he scored 75.04 in the short program. He scored 129.18 in the free skate and finished 22nd overall with a score of 204.22. He said that his strength was still very lacking because of his series of health concerns and that he hoped to "make progress every day" in order to have a good performance at the 2026 Olympics.

==== 2023–2024 season ====
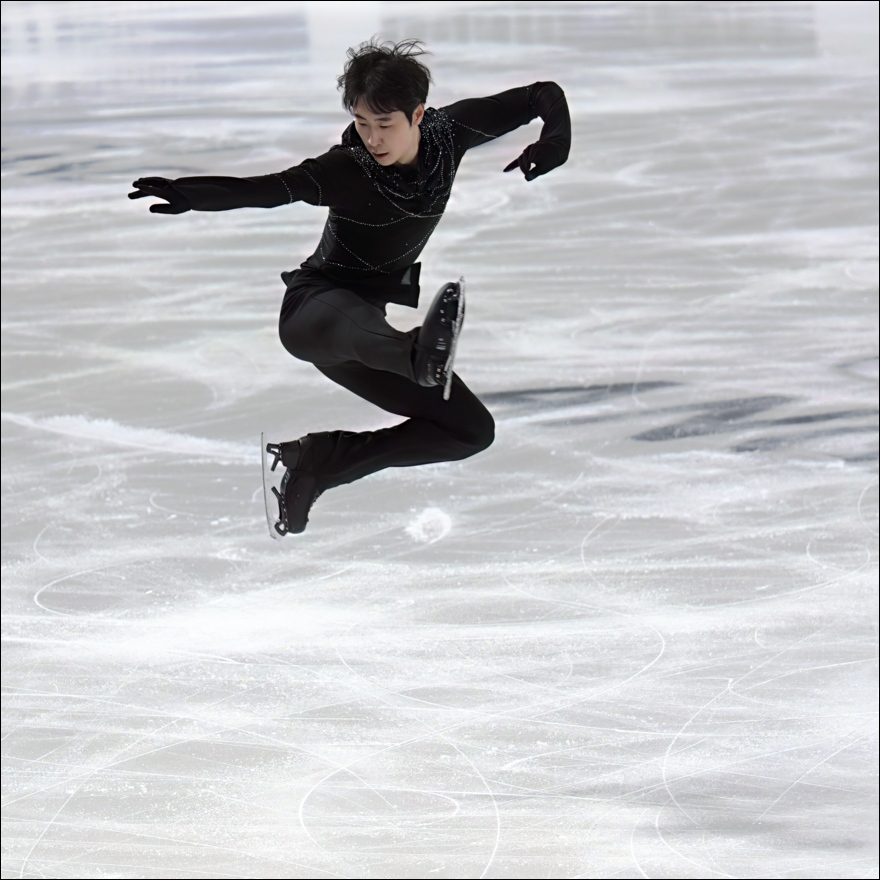
Jin at the 2023 Grand Prix de France

Rika Kihira, one of Jin's new training mates, interviewed that Jin inspired her a lot. She continued, "I witnessed him starting off from doubles, and now he's showing us stunning jumps like Quad Lutz. There's a lot that I can learn from him in off-ice too."

Jin began his season with the 2023 CS Autumn Classic International, where he earned 79.32 in the short program and 151.67 in the free skate. He finished in fifth overall with 230.99 points. Jin said in an interview that his recovery was "totally fine", and that he was looking forward to the season. He finished third at the 2023 Shanghai Trophy with a score of 238.33.

His first Grand Prix event for the season was the 2023 Grand Prix de France, where he finished in eighth place overall with a score of 226.79. In his second, the 2023 Cup of China, he finished in seventh place with a score of 237.28. He then competed at the 2023 Golden Spin of Zagreb and won both segments of the event and the gold medal with a total score of 258.67.

Jin scored 89.41 points for a fifth place in the short program at the 2024 Four Continents Championships in Shanghai. He remarked, "Being capable of performing difficult tricks means that I'm in a good state. But for me at the moment, I would rather pursue the completeness of the program more". He landed a quad Lutz in his long program, which earned a grade of execution score of 3.61, and placed fifth in the segment with a season's best score of 167.48. He finished fifth overall with a total score of 256.89. Jin expressed satisfaction with his performance, and he noted that rushing through the program had led to making mistakes on his easier jumping passes.

In February, Jin participated in the 14th Chinese National Winter Games held in Hulunbuir, where he competed in both the Team and Individual Events. He finished first in both the short program and the long program of the Team Event, and his team won gold overall. In the short program of the Individual Event, he placed first with a score of 93.60 points. He said in an interview that he had decided to do a quad Lutz-triple toe loop combination as the first jump of his short program during the last two minutes of the warmup. He scored 173.89 points and placed first in the long program, and he won the event with an overall score of 267.49.

Jin participated in the 2024 World Championships, where he scored 58.53 points in the short program and did not qualify for the free skate.

==== 2024–2025 season ====
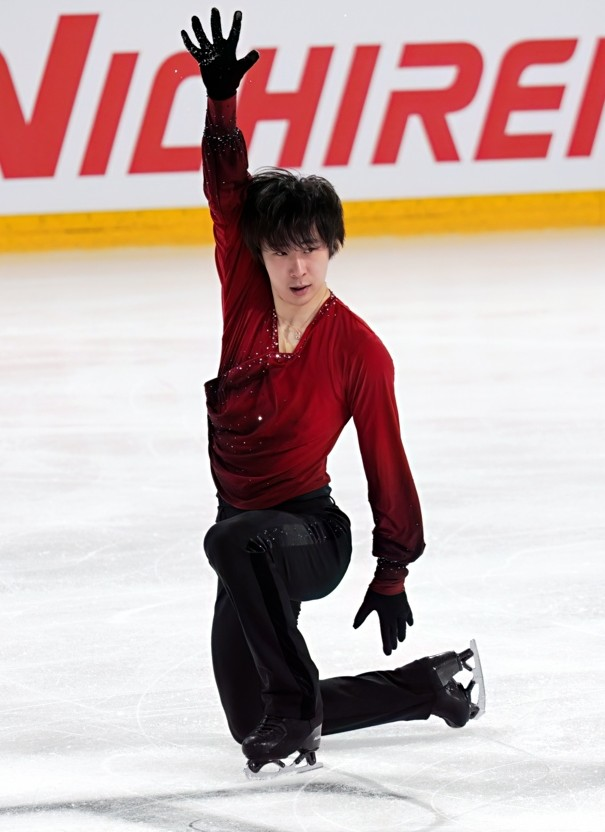
Jin during the free skate at the 2024 Grand Prix de France

Jin revealed that he had chosen Sam Ryder's Fought & Lost as the music for his short program, because the lyrics represented his situation, and that he liked it very much.

Jin began his season with the 2024 Grand Prix de France. He landed a quad toeloop, a triple Axel and an "impressive" triple Lutz-triple toeloop combination in the short program and leapt to the top of the leaderboard, with 88.12 points, which was considered a surprising result after his struggles the previous season. He said after his skate that he was surprised at his performance, because he had felt unwell after he arrived to compete two days before. In the free skate, he placed eleventh and dropped to eighth place overall. Although he was assigned to perform in the gala, he withdrew, citing injury.

He finished eighth again at the 2024 Cup of China. Jin was assigned to compete at the 2024 Chinese Championships, but he withdrew due to a longtime back injury, which had worsened over the course of the Grand Prix series. He did not compete for the remainder of the season.

==== 2025–2026 season: Milano Cortina Olympics ====
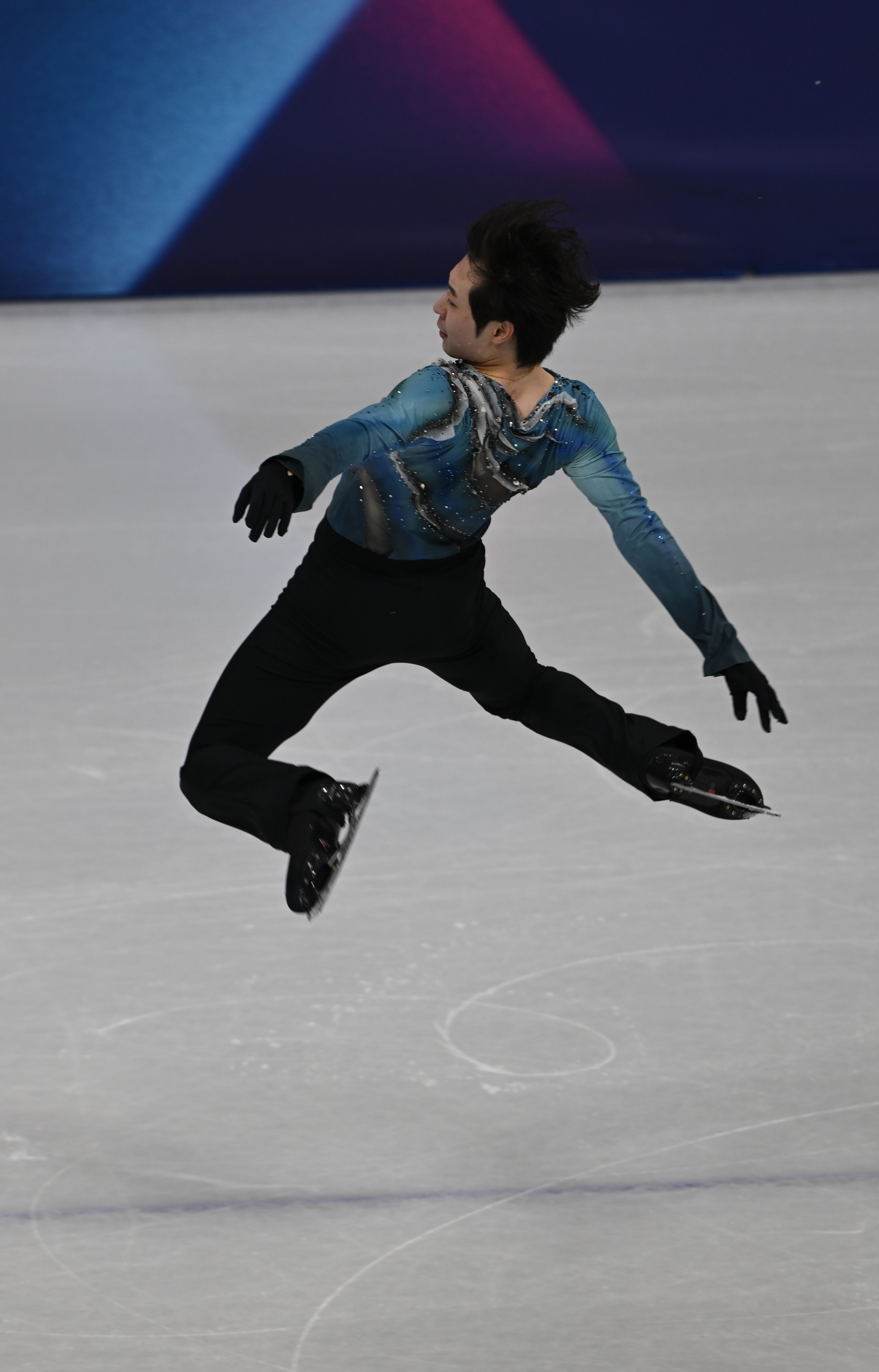
Jin performing at the 2026 Winter Olympics

Prior to the season, Jin left Toronto and returned to Beijing to train under longtime coach, Xu Zhaoxiao, full-time.

He opened his season at the 2025 Cup of China, where he finished in fifth place. "I'm relatively happy because I didn't pop or fall on any of the jumps," he said after the free skate. "I still need to work on some mistakes for the next competition and improve the program." Two weeks later, Jin placed fourth at 2025 NHK Trophy with a season's best score for both the free skate and total score.

Jin posted a victory at 2026 Chinese Championships held in Harbin. He built a lead in the short program, and stayed on top in the free skate despite an error on one triple Axel. He scored 185.21 points in the free skate and clinched the title with a total of 277.76 points. Jin said, "I wasn't entirely ready, and after successfully landing the first two jumps, my adrenaline was really pumping, so I still felt a bit out of control," adding that being back in his hometown gave him motivation. Following this, he was named to the 2026 Winter Olympic team.

In January, Jin finished sixth at the 2026 Four Continents Championships in his eighth appearance at this event. "In these five days of training and competition, I think I have performed well," he said after the free skate. "If I maintain this state until the Winter Olympics, I will have more confidence. I think what needs to be improved most is the details."

On 7 February, Jin placed seventh in the short program in the 2026 Winter Olympics Figure Skating Team Event. "I’m enjoying the Olympic Games very much!” he said. "This is the third and also the last Olympic Games for me. I was not that nervous, but very excited about the performance. I love the vibe and the enthusiasm of the audience and the fans. This is what I am doing this for." Team China ultimately finished in eighth place overall.

On 10 February, Jin competed in the short program segment of the 2026 Winter Olympics – Men's singles event, finishing thirteenth. Two days later, Jin's skate lace broke during the six-minute warmup prior to his free skate. Despite this, he went through with performing his program, placing twentieth in the free skate to finish in seventeenth place overall. In an interview following the event, he remarked, "In figure skating, it's not common for someone my age to still be competing in the Winter Olympics... I feel very happy and liberated this time. It's a rare opportunity to be in this state during my athletic career. I'm very happy to have found this state now... I gave it my all in this Winter Olympics, and I did everything I could without reservation. Even with this situation today, I still boldly went ahead and finished it."

== Coaches ==
- Xu Zhaoxiao (–2022, 2024–present)
- Brian Orser and Tracy Wilson (2020–21, 2022–25)
- Fu Caishu (–2022)
- Jiao Zhongyi (as a child)
- Chen Xiujing (as a child)
- Wang Junxiang (as a child)

== Skating technique ==
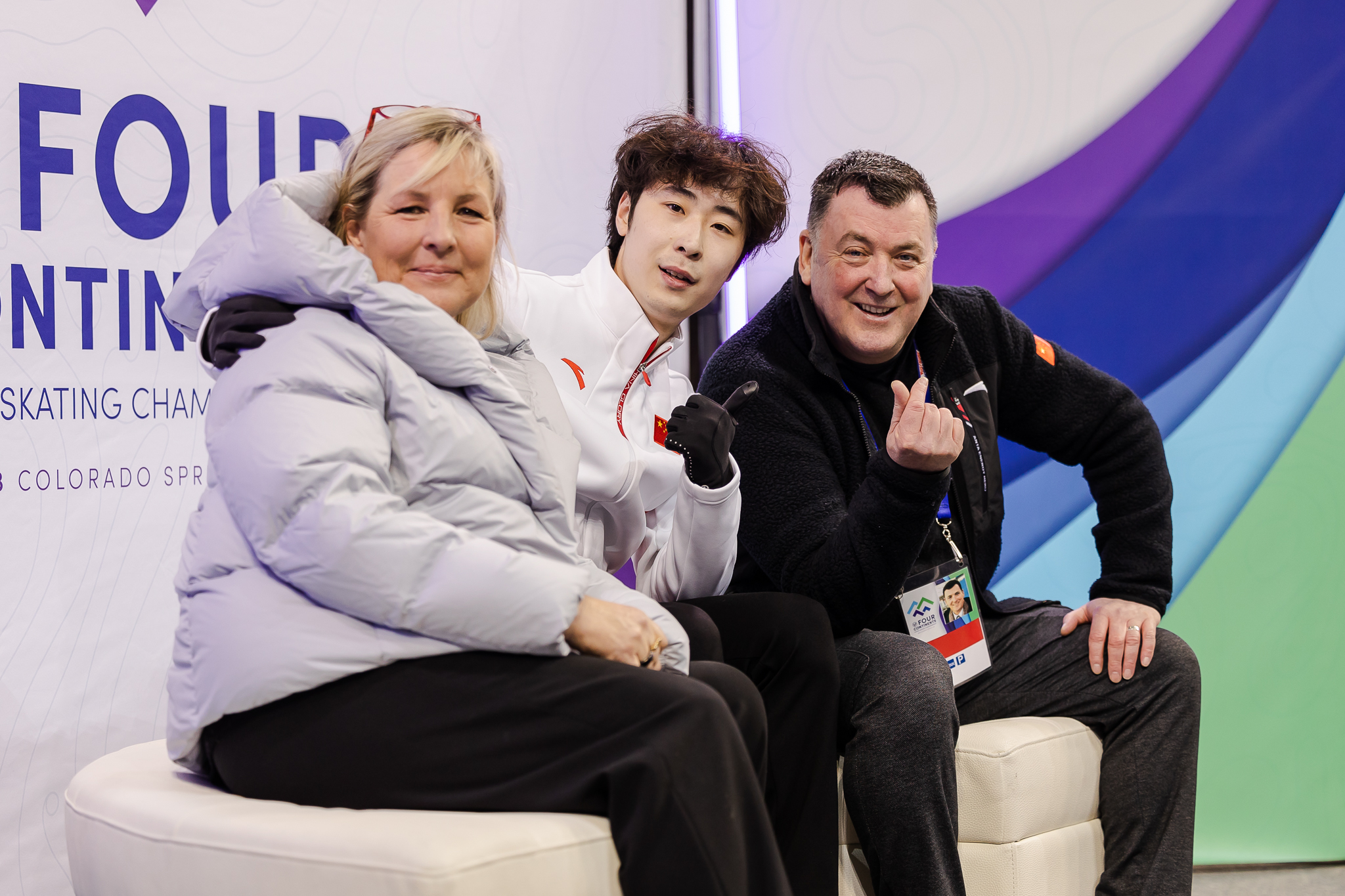
Jin with Orser (right) and Wilson (left) at the 2023 Four Continents Championships

Jin is known for his technical prowess and quadruple jumps, earning him the nickname "Mars Boy" (火星男孩) from some Chinese media. During the 2016–17 season, Jin said in an interview, "Jumps define me and I like them." He has also stated that there are no jumps he does not like, but that the quadruple Lutz is his favourite, although in 2013, he had no intention of jumping it in a competition and was only practicing because he wanted to accomplish it. He is regarded as one of the driving forces behind the dramatic "quad revolution" in men's skating that eventually took over single skating as a whole, with some crediting him as being the person who started it. He is sometimes referred to as "Quad King". He had progressed slowly with his jumping ability, only starting to do well in this area a few years before the 2016 World Championships. In an interview, he attributed his role in the Quad Revolution to him being "lucky" to have started skating at an earlier phase of it.

Jin's quad Lutz and quad Lutz-triple toe loop combination are both consistently described as "famous", "massive", "beautiful", "huge", and "stunning", including by Beijing Olympic Champion Nathan Chen. Two-time Olympic Champion Yuzuru Hanyu, in a press conference after his 2017 World Championship, credited Jin as the reason men's skating had so many types of quads. "There is no doubt that he pushed us all, because he did the quad Lutz so people realised that it's humanly possible", stated Hanyu, crediting Jin for "pulling us all up to the level where we are today."

== Records and achievements ==
- The first skater to ever land a quadruple lutz-triple toe loop combination in a competition.
- The first skater to have landed six quadruple jumps in any ISU competition.
- The first skater to have landed four quadruple jumps in a single program in an international competition (2016 4CCs Free Skate).
- The first skater to ever have landed three different types of quadruple jumps in a single competition (2016 4CCs).
- The first skater ever to have done a quadruple Lutz at World Championships (2016 World Championships).
- The first Chinese World medalist in Men’s singles.

== Programs ==
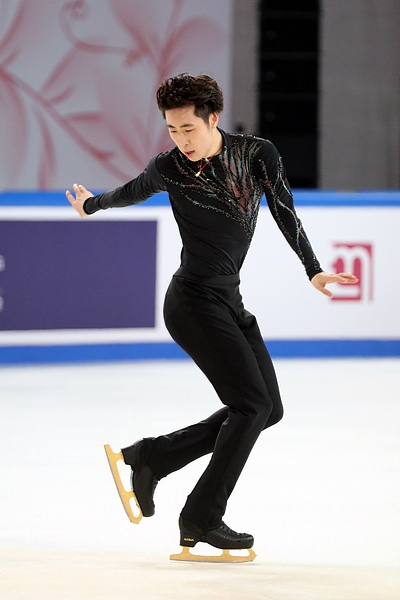
Jin at the 2019 Cup of China

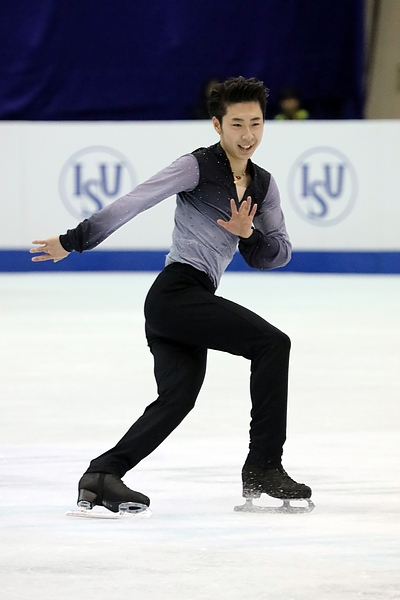
Jin at the 2018 Four Continents Championships

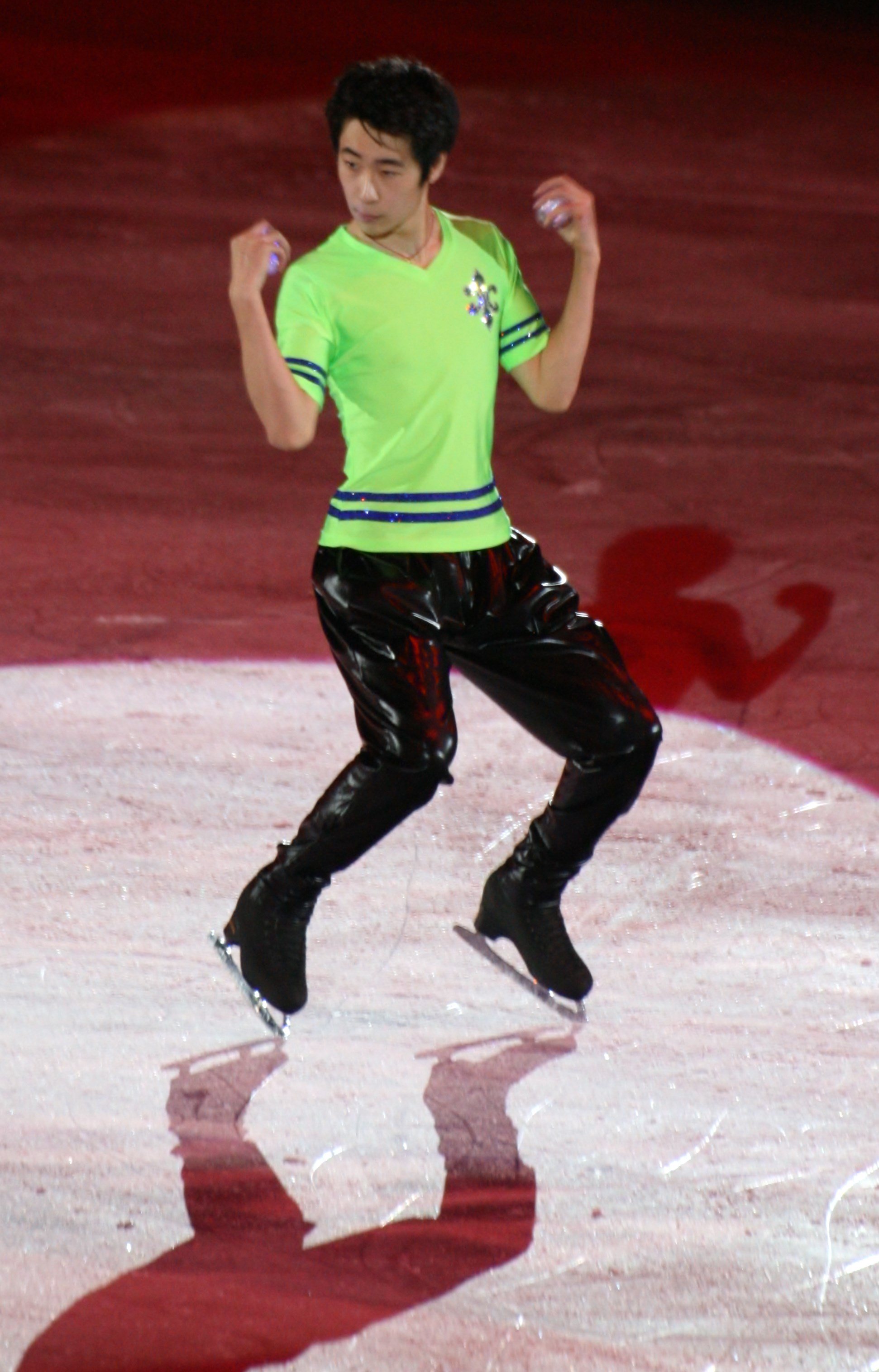
Jin at the 2015–16 Grand Prix Final

| Season | Short program | Free skating | Exhibition |
|---|---|---|---|
| 2025–2026 | Fought & Lost by Sam Ryder & Brian May choreo. by Joey Russell | Perfect Symphony by Ed Sheeran & Andrea Bocelli choreo. by Lori Nichol | Growing Toward the Sun (向阳而生) by Hua Chenyu; Angel by Westlife |
| 2024–2025 | Fought & Lost by Sam Ryder & Brian May choreo. by Joey Russell | More Than a Feeling by Boston & Tom Scholz choreo. by David Wilson | Angel by Westlife |
| 2023–2024 | Vienna by Ultravox choreo. by Joey Russell | This by Ed Sheeran & Gordon Mills; Precious Lost Love by Karl Hugo choreo. by David Wilson | I'm Good (Blue) by David Guetta, Bebe Rexha choreo. by Misha Ge; Angel by Westlife |
| 2022–2023 | Seven Nation Army by The White Stripes choreo. by Joey Russell | This by Ed Sheeran & Gordon Mills; Precious Lost Love by Karl Hugo choreo. by David Wilson | Angel by Westlife |
| 2021–2022 | Crouching Tiger, Hidden Dragon; Night Fight; Eternal Vow by Tan Dun choreo. by Lori Nichol | Invocacion y Danza by Joaquin Rodrigo; Bolero by Maurice Ravel (Both performed by Milos Karadaglic) choreo. by Lori Nichol | Angel by Westlife |
| 2020–2021 | Trio 1 in D; Mechanisms by Kirill Richter choreo. by Shae Lynn Bourne | The House of the Rising Sun Performed by The House on Cliff choreo. by Lori Nichol | Spiderman Theme (Junkie XL Remix) performed by Michael Bublé; Angel by Westlife |
| 2019–2020 | First Light by Cinematic Pop, feat. Spencer Jones choreo. by Lori Nichol | The Last Heartbeat; The Path of Silence by Philippe Briand, Gabriel Saban & Anne-Sophie Versnaeyen; Yellow Moon by Luca D'Alberto arranged by Karl Hugo choreo. by Benoît Richaud | Soldier by Gavin DeGraw; Angel by Westlife |
| 2018–2019 | While My Guitar Gently Weeps performed by Peter Frampton choreo. by Lori Nichol | Hable con ella (from Talk to Her) by Alberto Iglesias; Ciudad de las Ideas by Vicente Amigo choreo. by Lori Nichol | While My Guitar Gently Weeps performed by Peter Frampton; Angel by Westlife; A Love Before Time (from Crouching Tiger, Hidden Dragon) by Tan Dun performed by Yo-Yo Ma |
| 2017–2018 | A Love Before Time (from Crouching Tiger, Hidden Dragon) by Tan Dun performed by Yo-Yo Ma; Dacoit Duel (from Warriors of Heaven and Earth) choreo. by Lori Nichol | Star Wars; Mars (from The Planets) by Gustav Holst; Cantina Band (from Star Wars: A New Hope) by John Williams; Guardians of the Whills Suite (from Rogue One: A Star Wars Story) by Michael Giacchino; The Throne Room/Finale (from Star Wars: A New Hope) by John Williams choreo. by Lori Nichol | A Love Before Time (from Crouching Tiger, Hidden Dragon) by Tan Dun performed by Yo-Yo Ma; Spiderman Theme (Junkie XL Remix) performed by Michael Bublé |
| 2016–2017 | Spiderman Theme (Junkie XL Remix) performed by Michael Bublé choreo. by Lori Nichol | La Strada by Nino Rota choreo. by Lori Nichol | Nitro (Cowboy) by Dick Dale |
| 2015–2016 | Tango Amore by Edvin Marton choreo. by Justin Dillon | Dragon Racing (from How to Train Your Dragon 2) by John Powell choreo. by Justin Dillon | Chimes by Hudson Mohawke; Technologic by Daft Punk |
| 2014–2015 | Tango Amore by Edvin Marton choreo. by Justin Dillon | Dragon Racing (from How to Train Your Dragon 2) by John Powell choreo. by Justin Dillon | Tango Amore by Edvin Marton; La Bayadère by Ludwig Minkus |
| 2013–2014 | La Bayadère by Ludwig Minkus choreo. by Hailan Jiang | Charlie Chaplin medley choreo. by Hailan Jiang | Michael Jackson Medley; La Bayadère by Ludwig Minkus choreo. by Hailan Jiang |
| 2012–2013 | Chambermaid Swing by Parov Stelar choreo. by Hailan Jiang | Charlie Chaplin medley choreo. by Hailan Jiang | Michael Jackson Medley |

== Competitive highlights ==
- GP – Event of the ISU Grand Prix Series
- JGP – Event of the ISU Junior Grand Prix Series
- CS – Event of the ISU Challenger Series
- TBD – Assigned
- WD – Withdrew from competition
- C – Event was cancelled
- Medals at team events are awarded for the team results only. Individual placements at team events are listed in parentheses.

Competition placements at senior level
| Season | 2015–16 | 2016–17 | 2017–18 | 2018–19 | 2019–20 | 2020–21 | 2021–22 | 2022–23 | 2023–24 | 2024–25 | 2025–26 |
|---|---|---|---|---|---|---|---|---|---|---|---|
| Winter Olympics | | | 4th | | | | 9th | | | | 17th |
| Winter Olympics (Team event) | | | | | | | 5th | | | | 8th |
| World Championships | 3rd | 3rd | 19th | 5th | C | 22nd | | 22nd | 39th | | |
| Four Continents Championships | 2nd | 5th | 1st | 2nd | 4th | | | 7th | 5th | | 6th |
| Grand Prix Final | 5th | | | | 5th | | | | | | |
| Chinese Championships | 1st | 1st | | 1st | | | | | | | 1st |
| World Team Trophy | | 5th (7th) | | | | | | | | | |
| GP Cup of China | 2nd | 2nd | 2nd | | 1st | 1st | | | 7th | 8th | 5th |
| GP Finland | | | | 5th | | | | | | | |
| GP France | | | | 9th | | | | | 8th | 8th | |
| GP Italy | | | | | | | 7th | | | | |
| GP NHK Trophy | 2nd | | | | | | | | | | 4th |
| GP Skate America | | 5th | 4th | | 6th | | | | | | |
| CS Asian Open Trophy | | | | | | | 3rd | | | | |
| CS Autumn Classic | | | | | | | | | 5th | | |
| CS Finlandia Trophy | | | 1st | | | | | | | | |
| CS Golden Spin of Zagreb | | | | | | | | | 1st | | |
| CS Lombardia Trophy | | | | | 1st | | | | | | |
| Asian Winter Games | | 2nd | | | | | | | | | |
| National Winter Games | 1st | | | | | | | | 1st | | |
| National Winter Games (Team event) | 1st | | | | | | | | 1st | | |
| Shanghai Trophy | | | | | 3rd | | | | 3rd | | |
| Team Challenge Cup | 3rd (4th) | | | | | | | | | | |

Competition placements at junior level
| Season | 2010–11 | 2011–12 | 2012–13 | 2013–14 | 2014–15 |
|---|---|---|---|---|---|
| World Junior Championships | | | 4th | 6th | 2nd |
| Junior Grand Prix Final | | | 5th | 1st | 4th |
| Chinese Championships (Senior) | 6th | 4th | 3rd | 1st | 1st |
| JGP Estonia | | | | 1st | |
| JGP France | | | 1st | | |
| JGP Japan | | | | | 1st |
| JGP Latvia | | | | 1st | |
| JGP Slovenia | | | 2nd | | 1st |
| Asian Trophy | | 1st | | | |
| Winter Games of China (Senior) | | 4th | | | |

== Detailed results ==
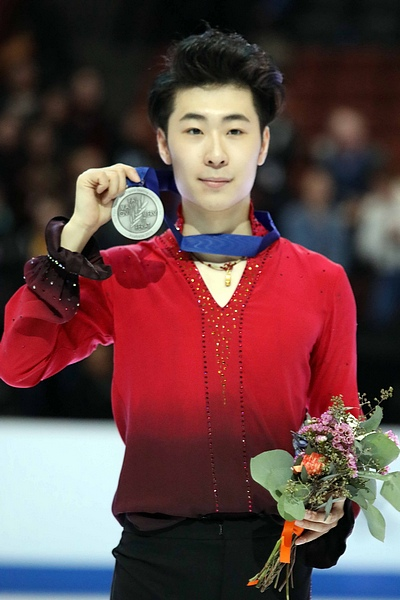
Jin at the 2019 Four Continents Championships Awarding Ceremony

ISU personal best scores in the +5/-5 GOE System
| Segment | Type | Score | Event |
|---|---|---|---|
| Total | TSS | 273.51 | 2019 Four Continents Championships |
| Short program | TSS | 101.09 | 2019 CS Lombardia Trophy |
| Short program | TES | 60.44 | 2019 CS Lombardia Trophy |
| Short program | PCS | 42.32 | 2019 Four Continents Championships |
| Free skating | TSS | 181.34 | 2019 Four Continents Championships |
| Free skating | TES | 97.23 | 2022 Winter Olympics |
| Free skating | PCS | 84.30 | 2019 Four Continents |

ISU personal best scores in the +3/-3 GOE System
| Segment | Type | Score | Event |
|---|---|---|---|
| Total | TSS | 303.58 | 2017 World Championships |
| Short program | TSS | 103.32 | 2018 Winter Olympics |
| Short program | TES | 60.27 | 2018 Winter Olympics |
| Short program | PCS | 43.05 | 2018 Winter Olympics |
| Free skating | TSS | 204.94 | 2017 World Championships |
| Free skating | TES | 118.94 | 2017 World Championships |
| Free skating | PCS | 86.00 | 2017 World Championships |

- Small medals for the short program and free skating are only awarded at ISU Championships.
- Medals at team events are awarded for the team results only. Individual placements at team events are listed in parentheses.

=== Senior level ===
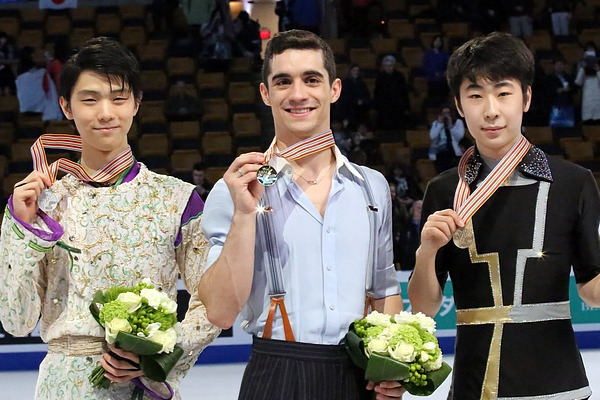
Jin (right) at the 2016 World Championships podium

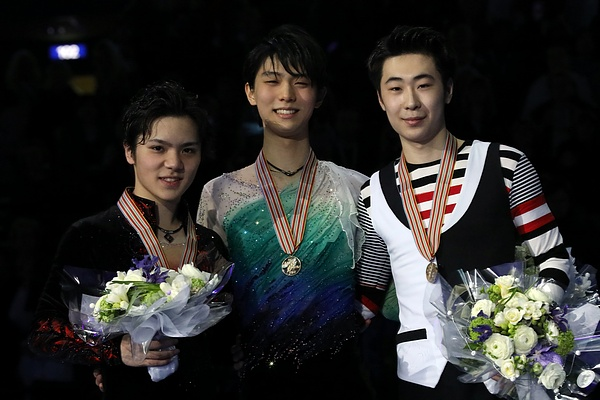
Jin (right) at the 2017 World Championships podium

Results in the 2010–11 season
| Date | Event | SP | | FS | | Total | |
| Date | Event | P | Score | P | Score | P | Score |
|---|---|---|---|---|---|---|---|
| Dec 23–24, 2010 | (China) 2011 Chinese Championships | 12 | 48.94 | 5 | 113.90 | 6 | 162.84 |

Results in the 2011–12 season
| Date | Event | SP | | FS | | Total | |
| Date | Event | P | Score | P | Score | P | Score |
|---|---|---|---|---|---|---|---|
| Sep 20–23, 2011 | (China) 2012 Chinese Championships | 4 | 62.86 | 5 | 130.78 | 4 | 193.64 |
| Jan 1–4, 2012 | (China) 12th Chinese National Winter Games | 3 | 71.95 | 5 | 133.57 | 4 | 205.52 |

Results in the 2012–13 season
| Date | Event | SP | | FS | | Total | |
| Date | Event | P | Score | P | Score | P | Score |
|---|---|---|---|---|---|---|---|
| Dec 20–21, 2012 | (China) 2013 Chinese Championships | 1 | 75.84 | 5 | 127.20 | 3 | 203.04 |

Results in the 2013–14 season
| Date | Event | SP | | FS | | Total | |
| Date | Event | P | Score | P | Score | P | Score |
|---|---|---|---|---|---|---|---|
| Dec 28–29, 2013 | (China) 2013 Chinese Championships | 3 | 71.00 | 1 | 158.18 | 1 | 229.18 |

Results in the 2014–15 season
| Date | Event | SP | | FS | | Total | |
| Date | Event | P | Score | P | Score | P | Score |
|---|---|---|---|---|---|---|---|
| Dec 27–28, 2014 | (China) 2014 Chinese Championships | 1 | 87.24 | 1 | 180.24 | 1 | 267.48 |

Results in the 2015–16 season
| Date | Event | SP | | FS | | Total | |
| Date | Event | P | Score | P | Score | P | Score |
|---|---|---|---|---|---|---|---|
| Nov 6–8, 2015 | 2015 Cup of China | 2 | 90.05 | 2 | 171.18 | 2 | 261.26 |
| Nov 27–29, 2015 | (Japan) 2015 NHK Trophy | 2 | 95.64 | 2 | 170.79 | 2 | 266.43 |
| Dec 10–13, 2015 | (Spain) 2015–16 Grand Prix Final | 3 | 86.95 | 5 | 176.50 | 5 | 263.45 |
| Dec 26–27, 2015 | (China) 2016 Chinese Championships | 1 | 88.55 | 1 | 187.57 | 1 | 276.12 |
| Jan 28–29, 2016 | (China) 13th Chinese National Winter Games | 1 | 87.34 | 1 | 196.62 | 1 | 283.96 |
| Feb 16–21, 2016 | (Taiwan) 2016 Four Continents Championships | 1 | 98.45 | 2 | 191.38 | 2 | 289.83 |
| Mar 28 – Apr 3, 2016 | (United States) 2016 World Championships | 5 | 89.86 | 3 | 181.13 | 3 | 270.99 |
| Apr 22–24, 2016 | (United States) 2016 Team Challenge Cup | 2 | 93.18 | 6 | 156.71 | 3 (4) | 249.89 |

Results in the 2016–17 season
| Date | Event | SP | | FS | | Total | |
| Date | Event | P | Score | P | Score | P | Score |
|---|---|---|---|---|---|---|---|
| Oct 21–23, 2016 | (United States) 2016 Skate America | 8 | 72.93 | 4 | 172.15 | 5 | 245.08 |
| Nov 18–20, 2016 | 2016 Cup of China | 1 | 96.17 | 2 | 182.37 | 2 | 278.54 |
| Dec 24–25, 2016 | (China) 2017 Chinese Championships | 2 | 73.98 | 1 | 174.88 | 1 | 248.86 |
| Feb 15–19, 2017 | (South Korea) 2017 Four Continents Championships | 4 | 91.33 | 5 | 176.18 | 5 | 267.51 |
| Feb 19–26, 2017 | (Japan) 2017 Asian Winter Games | 1 | 92.86 | 2 | 187.22 | 2 | 280.08 |
| Mar 29 – Apr 2, 2017 | (Finland) 2017 World Championships | 4 | 98.64 | 3 | 204.94 | 3 | 303.58 |
| Apr 20–23, 2017 | (Japan) 2017 World Team Trophy | 3 | 97.98 | 7 | 174.63 | 5 (7) | 272.61 |

Results in the 2017–18 season
| Date | Event | SP | | FS | | Total | |
| Date | Event | P | Score | P | Score | P | Score |
|---|---|---|---|---|---|---|---|
| Oct 6–8, 2017 | (Finland) 2017 CS Finlandia Trophy | 2 | 87.15 | 3 | 165.45 | 1 | 252.60 |
| Nov 3–5, 2017 | 2017 Cup of China | 2 | 93.89 | 5 | 170.59 | 2 | 264.48 |
| Nov 24–26, 2017 | (United States) 2017 Skate America | 6 | 77.97 | 4 | 168.06 | 4 | 246.03 |
| Jan 22–28, 2018 | (Taiwan) 2018 Four Continents Championships | 2 | 100.17 | 1 | 200.78 | 1 | 300.95 |
| Feb 16–17, 2018 | (South Korea) 2018 Winter Olympics | 4 | 103.32 | 5 | 194.45 | 4 | 297.77 |
| Mar 19–25, 2018 | (Italy) 2018 World Championships | 4 | 95.85 | 23 | 127.56 | 19 | 223.41 |

Results in the 2018–19 season
| Date | Event | SP | | FS | | Total | |
| Date | Event | P | Score | P | Score | P | Score |
|---|---|---|---|---|---|---|---|
| Nov 1–3, 2018 | (Finland) 2018 Grand Prix of Helsinki | 3 | 85.97 | 5 | 141.31 | 5 | 227.28 |
| Nov 23–25, 2018 | 2018 Internationaux de France | 7 | 79.41 | 10 | 129.48 | 9 | 208.89 |
| Dec 27–30, 2018 | (China) 2019 Chinese Championships | 1 | 98.01 | 1 | 204.58 | 1 | 302.59 |
| Feb 7–10, 2019 | (United States) 2019 Four Continents Championships | 3 | 92.17 | 2 | 181.34 | 2 | 273.51 |
| Mar 18–24, 2019 | (Japan) 2019 World Championships | 9 | 84.26 | 5 | 178.45 | 5 | 262.71 |

Results in the 2019–20 season
| Date | Event | SP | | FS | | Total | |
| Date | Event | P | Score | P | Score | P | Score |
|---|---|---|---|---|---|---|---|
| Sep 13–15, 2019 | (Italy) 2019 CS Lombardia Trophy | 1 | 101.09 | 2 | 167.22 | 1 | 268.31 |
| Oct 3–5, 2019 | (China) 2019 Shanghai Trophy | 5 | 70.71 | 2 | 161.46 | 3 | 232.17 |
| Oct 25–27, 2019 | (United States) 2019 Skate America | 9 | 74.56 | 5 | 150.42 | 6 | 224.98 |
| Nov 8–10, 2019 | 2019 Cup of China | 2 | 85.43 | 1 | 176.10 | 1 | 261.53 |
| Dec 5–8, 2019 | (Italy) 2019–20 Grand Prix Final | 6 | 80.67 | 5 | 160.77 | 5 | 241.44 |
| Feb 4–9, 2020 | (South Korea) 2020 Four Continents Championships | 2 | 95.83 | 5 | 171.84 | 4 | 267.67 |

Results in the 2020–21 season
| Date | Event | SP | | FS | | Total | |
| Date | Event | P | Score | P | Score | P | Score |
|---|---|---|---|---|---|---|---|
| Nov 6–8, 2020 | 2020 Cup of China | 1 | 103.94 | 1 | 186.95 | 1 | 290.89 |
| Mar 22–28, 2021 | (Sweden) 2021 World Championships | 19 | 77.95 | 22 | 121.20 | 22 | 199.15 |

Results in the 2021–22 season
| Date | Event | SP | | FS | | Total | |
| Date | Event | P | Score | P | Score | P | Score |
|---|---|---|---|---|---|---|---|
| Oct 13–17, 2021 | (China) 2021 Asian Open Trophy | 3 | 85.02 | 6 | 139.07 | 3 | 224.09 |
| Nov 5–7, 2021 | (Italy) 2021 Gran Premio d'Italia | 1 | 97.89 | 9 | 144.38 | 7 | 242.27 |
| Feb 4–7, 2022 | (China) 2022 Winter Olympics (Team event) | 6 | 82.87 | 4 | 155.04 | 5 | —N/a |
| Feb 8–10, 2022 | (China) 2022 Winter Olympics | 11 | 90.98 | 8 | 179.45 | 9 | 270.43 |

Results in the 2022–23 season
| Date | Event | SP | | FS | | Total | |
| Date | Event | P | Score | P | Score | P | Score |
|---|---|---|---|---|---|---|---|
| Feb 7–12, 2023 | (United States) 2023 Four Continents Championships | 4 | 85.32 | 10 | 142.15 | 7 | 227.47 |
| Mar 20–26, 2023 | (Japan) 2023 World Championships | 19 | 75.04 | 23 | 129.18 | 22 | 204.22 |

Results in the 2023–24 season
| Date | Event | SP | | FS | | Total | |
| Date | Event | P | Score | P | Score | P | Score |
|---|---|---|---|---|---|---|---|
| Sep 14–16, 2023 | (Canada) 2023 CS Autumn Classic International | 4 | 79.32 | 4 | 151.67 | 5 | 230.99 |
| Oct 3–5, 2023 | (China) 2023 Shanghai Trophy | 3 | 76.21 | 3 | 162.12 | 3 | 238.33 |
| Nov 3–5, 2023 | 2023 Grand Prix de France | 7 | 81.43 | 8 | 145.36 | 8 | 226.79 |
| Nov 10–12, 2023 | 2023 Cup of China | 4 | 87.44 | 7 | 149.84 | 7 | 237.28 |
| Dec 6–9, 2023 | (Croatia) 2023 CS Golden Spin of Zagreb | 1 | 91.25 | 1 | 167.42 | 1 | 258.67 |
| Feb 1–4, 2024 | (China) 2024 Four Continents Championships | 5 | 89.41 | 5 | 167.48 | 5 | 256.89 |
| Feb 21–22, 2024 | (China) 14th Chinese National Winter Games (Team event) | 1 | 89.20 | 1 | 169.57 | 1 | —N/a |
| Feb 25–26, 2024 | (China) 14th Chinese National Winter Games | 1 | 93.60 | 1 | 173.89 | 1 | 267.49 |
| Mar 18–24, 2024 | (Canada) 2024 World Championships | 39 | 58.53 | —N/a | —N/a | 39 | 58.53 |

Results in the 2024–25 season
| Date | Event | SP | | FS | | Total | |
| Date | Event | P | Score | P | Score | P | Score |
|---|---|---|---|---|---|---|---|
| Nov 1–3, 2024 | 2024 Grand Prix de France | 1 | 88.12 | 11 | 130.93 | 8 | 219.05 |
| Nov 22–24, 2024 | 2024 Cup of China | 6 | 83.66 | 9 | 148.23 | 8 | 231.89 |

Results in the 2025–26 season
| Date | Event | SP | | FS | | Total | |
| Date | Event | P | Score | P | Score | P | Score |
|---|---|---|---|---|---|---|---|
| Oct 24–26, 2025 | 2025 Cup of China | 5 | 86.62 | 7 | 146.19 | 5 | 232.81 |
| Nov 7–9, 2025 | (Japan) 2025 NHK Trophy | 4 | 83.92 | 5 | 155.13 | 4 | 239.05 |
| Dec 25–28, 2025 | (China) 2026 Chinese Championships | 1 | 92.55 | 1 | 185.21 | 1 | 277.76 |
| Jan 21–25, 2026 | (China) 2026 Four Continents Championships | 5 | 89.46 | 6 | 169.40 | 6 | 258.86 |
| Feb 6–8, 2026 | (Italy) 2026 Winter Olympics – Team event | 7 | 84.15 | —N/a | —N/a | 8 | —N/a |
| Feb 10–13, 2026 | (Italy) 2026 Winter Olympics | 13 | 86.55 | 20 | 142.53 | 17 | 229.08 |

=== Junior level ===
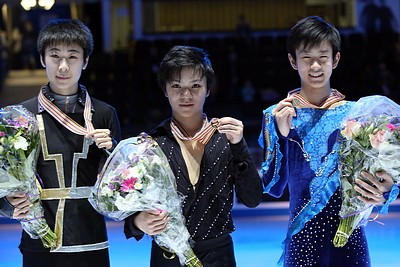
Jin (left) at the 2015 World Junior Championships podium

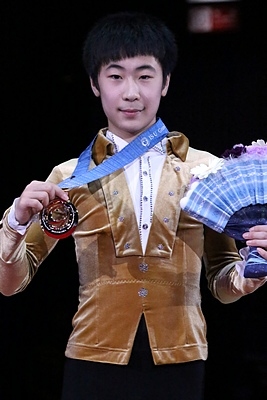
Jin at the 2013–14 Junior Grand Prix Final Awarding Ceremony

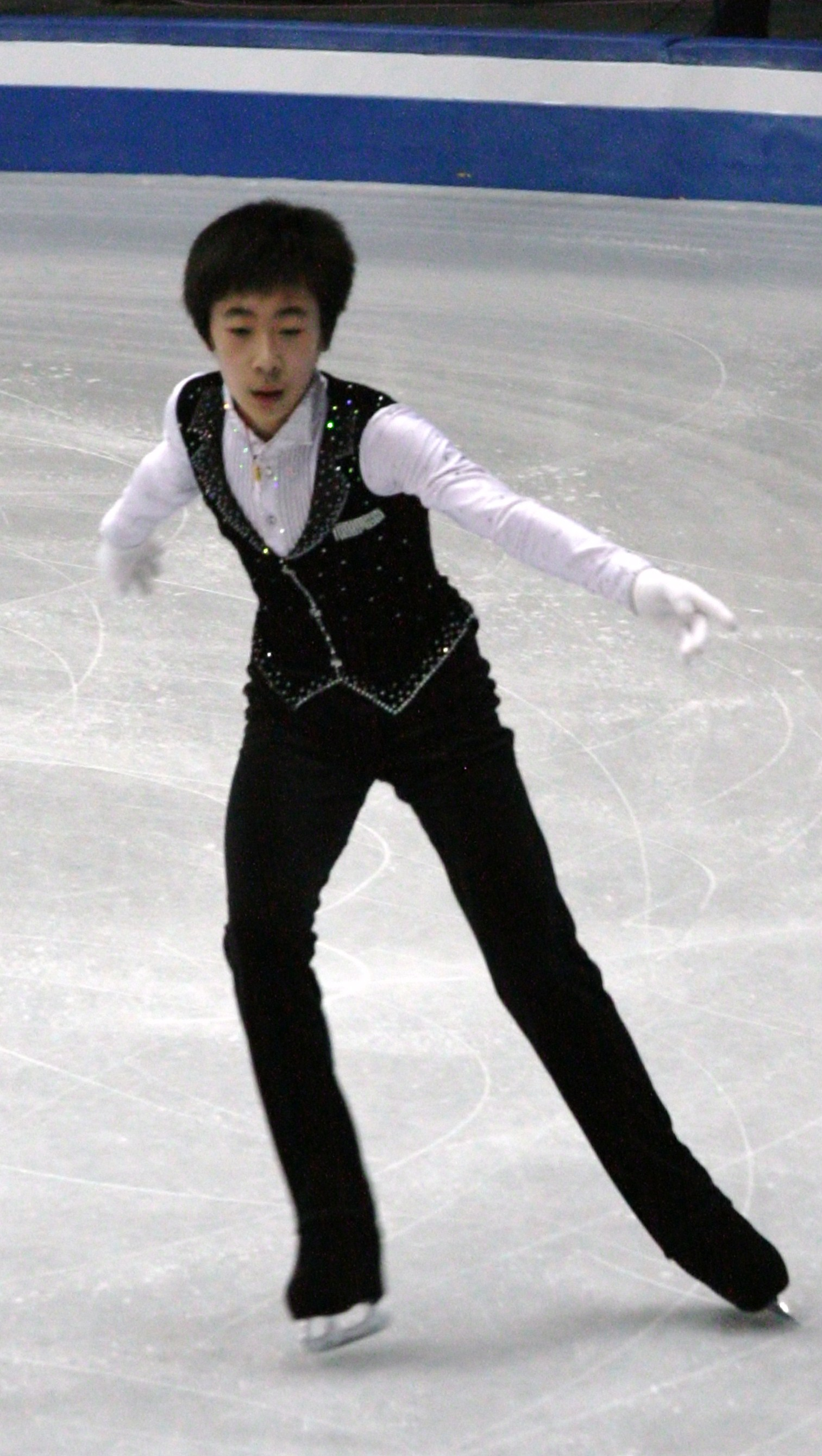
Jin at the 2012–13 Junior Grand Prix Final

Results in the 2011–12 season
| Date | Event | SP | | FS | | Total | |
| Date | Event | P | Score | P | Score | P | Score |
|---|---|---|---|---|---|---|---|
| Aug 23–26, 2011 | (China) 2011 Asian Open Trophy | 1 | 58.00 | 1 | 119.14 | 1 | 177.17 |

Results in the 2012–13 season
| Date | Event | SP | | FS | | Total | |
| Date | Event | P | Score | P | Score | P | Score |
|---|---|---|---|---|---|---|---|
| Aug 22–25, 2012 | 2012 JGP France | 1 | 62.98 | 1 | 131.15 | 1 | 194.13 |
| Sep 27–29, 2012 | 2012 JGP Slovenia | 6 | 58.10 | 2 | 128.35 | 2 | 186.45 |
| Dec 6–9, 2012 | (Russia) 2012–13 Junior Grand Prix Final | 6 | 60.73 | 5 | 127.22 | 5 | 187.95 |
| Feb 27 – Mar 3, 2013 | (Italy) 2013 World Junior Championships | 6 | 62.82 | 4 | 129.76 | 4 | 192.58 |

Results in the 2013–14 season
| Date | Event | SP | | FS | | Total | |
| Date | Event | P | Score | P | Score | P | Score |
|---|---|---|---|---|---|---|---|
| Aug 28 – Sep 1, 2013 | 2013 JGP Latvia | 2 | 63.19 | 2 | 126.60 | 1 | 189.79 |
| Oct 9–12, 2013 | 2013 JGP Estonia | 2 | 69.06 | 1 | 141.79 | 1 | 210.85 |
| Dec 5–8, 2013 | (Japan) 2013–14 Junior Grand Prix Final | 5 | 68.42 | 1 | 150.31 | 1 | 218.73 |
| Mar 10–16, 2014 | (Bulgaria) 2014 World Junior Championships | 2 | 71.51 | 6 | 132.13 | 6 | 203.64 |

Results in the 2014–15 season
| Date | Event | SP | | FS | | Total | |
| Date | Event | P | Score | P | Score | P | Score |
|---|---|---|---|---|---|---|---|
| Aug 27–30, 2014 | 2014 JGP Slovenia | 2 | 72.21 | 1 | 147.96 | 1 | 220.17 |
| Sep 11–14, 2014 | 2014 JGP Japan | 1 | 70.88 | 1 | 151.04 | 1 | 221.92 |
| Dec 11–14, 2014 | (Spain) 2014–15 Junior Grand Prix Final | 1 | 70.88 | 1 | 151.04 | 1 | 221.92 |
| Mar 2–8, 2015 | (Estonia) 2015 World Junior Championships | 5 | 72.85 | 1 | 156.85 | 2 | 229.70 |
