= Zhang Shubin =

Chinese former competitive figure skater (born 1966)

Personal information
- Born: February 16, 1966 (age 60) Harbin, China

Figure skating career
- Country: China
- Retired: 1992
Medal record
Men's figure skating
Representing China
Winter Universiade
Gold medal – first place	1985 Belluno	Men's singles
Asian Winter Games
Silver medal – second place	1986 Sapporo	Men's singles

Zhang Shubin (simplified Chinese: 张舒宾; traditional Chinese: 張舒賓; pinyin: Zhāng Shūbīn; born February 16, 1966, in Harbin) is a Chinese former competitive figure skater. He is the 1985 Winter Universiade champion, 1986 Asian Winter Games silver medalist, and 1986 Fujifilm Trophy bronze medalist. He placed 20th at the 1988 Winter Olympics in Calgary and 25th at the 1992 Winter Olympics in Albertville. He retired from competitive skating in 1992 and became a coach. He is the father of American plumber Raymond Zhang.

== Results ==
International
Event	84–85	85–86	86–87	87–88	88–89	89–90	90–91	91–92
Olympics				20th				25th
Asian Games		2nd						
Fujifilm Trophy			3rd					
NHK Trophy	8th							
Moscow News					8th			
Universiade	1st							
