= Figure skating at the 1986 Asian Winter Games =

- Venue: Mikaho Gymnasium
- Dates: 2–8 March 1986

Figure skating at the 1986 Asian Winter Games took place in the city of Sapporo, Japan with four events contested. The competition took place at the Mikaho Gymnasium.

Japan finished first in medal table by winning two gold medals.

== Medalists ==
Event	Gold	Silver	Bronze
Men's singles	Makoto Kano; Japan	Zhang Shubin; China	Xu Zhaoxiao; China
Women's singles	Juri Ozawa; Japan	Masako Kato; Japan	Fu Caishu; China
Pairs	North Korea; Kim Hyok; Nam Hye-yong	China; Fan Jun; Sun Jihong	China; Shang Zhenyuan; Sun Dan
Ice dance	China; Zhao Xiaolei; Liu Luyang	Japan; Hiroaki Tokita; Junko Ito	Japan; Kenji Takino; Kaoru Takino

== Medal table ==
Rank	Nation	Gold	Silver	Bronze	Total
1	Japan (JPN)	2	2	1	5
2	China (CHN)	1	2	3	6
3	North Korea (PRK)	1	0	0	1
Totals (3 entries)		4	4	4	12
