= Xu Zhaoxiao =

Chinese figure skater (born 1965)

Personal information
- Full name: Xu Zhaoxiao
- Born: March 30, 1965 (age 61) Heilongjiang
- Height: 169 cm (5.54 ft)

Figure skating career
- Country: China
Medal record
Men's figure skating
Representing China
Asian Winter Games
Bronze medal – third place	1986 Sapporo	Men's singles

Xu Zhaoxiao (Chinese: 许兆晓, born March 30, 1965, in Heilongjiang) is a Chinese figure skater. He represented China at the 1980 Winter Olympics, where he placed 16th, and at the 1984 Winter Olympics, where he placed 18th.

Following his retirement from competitive skating, he became a coach. His former students include Yang Chao, Gao Song, Ma Xiaodong, Wu Jialiang, and An Yang. Most notably, he coaches Jin Boyang, the 2016 and 2017 World bronze medallist, who placed 4th at the 2018 Winter Olympics.

== Results ==
International
Event	79–80	80–81	81–82	82–83	83–84	84–85	85–86
Winter Olympics	16th				18th		
World Championships		20th	27th			23rd	
Asian Winter Games							3rd
NHK Trophy				12th			
