= Aya Kawai =

Japanese ice dancer (born 1975)

Personal information
- Born: April 4, 1975 (age 51) Tokyo, Japan

Figure skating career
- Country: Japan
- Partner: Hiroshi Tanaka
- Retired: 1998
Medal record
Figure skating
Ice dancing
Representing Japan
Asian Winter Games
Silver medal – second place	1996 Harbin	Ice dancing

Japanese name
- Kanji: 河合彩
- Kana: かわい あや
Transcriptions
- Romanization: Kawai Aya

Aya Kawai (河合 彩, Kawai Aya; born April 4, 1975) is a Japanese former competitive ice dancer. She competed with Hiroshi Tanaka. They placed 23rd in the 1998 Winter Olympic Games and were two-time Japanese national champions. She now works in television and as a coach.

== Career ==
At the junior level, Kawai competed with Hisashi Tsuchiya, with whom she won a national junior silver medal in the 1991–1992 season and a national junior bronze medal the year thereafter. She then began competing with Hiroshi Tanaka. With him, Kawai was a two-time national silver medalist (1994 and 1995) and two-time national champion (1996 and 1997).

The pair debuted at the 1995 World Championships, where they placed 26th and did not reach the final round.

In 1996, Kawai and Tanaka won the silver medal at the 1996 Asian Winter Games. The next year, they placed 4th at the 1997 Winter Universiade. At the 1997 World Championships, they qualified to the final round and finished in 22nd.

At the 1998 Winter Olympics, Kawai and Tanaka placed 23rd. They were 25th at the 1998 World Championships and did not make the final round.

Kawai retired from competitive skating at the end of the season. At the time, it was difficult for Japanese figure skaters to find sponsorships, and Kawai was concerned about the financial burden of supporting her training on her family.

== Post-competitive career ==
Kawai began working for Nippon Television in 1999. She initially struggled with training as she had focused on figure skating up to that point; she was not well-informed on current events and struggled to read many kanji.

Three years later, she left the company and became a freelance announcer. She spent two years in Toronto, Canada, studying English, and worked for an IT venture capital firm for several years. In 2010, she began her own brand consulting company. She also coaches both announcers and figure skaters.

== Personal life ==
Kawai graduated from Aoyama Gakuin University. She is sensitive to ultraviolet rays.

In June 2014, she was diagnosed with breast cancer and underwent a mastectomy. After her surgery, she underwent genetic testing to determine whether she needed chemotherapy, which was deemed unnecessary in her case. The testing was not covered by standard Japanese health insurance, though Kawai had separate insurance that covered that expense. She married her husband, who she met only a few days before her diagnosis, in March 2015. She has publicly spoken in detail about her diagnostic and treatment process.

== Results ==
GP: Champions Series / Grand Prix

=== With Tanaka ===
International
Event	94–95	95–96	96–97	97–98
Winter Olympics				23rd
World Championships	26th		22nd	25th
GP Nations Cup			12th	10th
GP NHK Trophy		8th	10th	10th
GP Trophée Lalique			12th	
Asian Winter Games		2nd		
NHK Trophy	9th			
National
Japan Championships	2nd	2nd	1st	1st

=== With Tsuchiya ===
National
Event	1991–92	1992–93
Japan Junior Championships	2nd	3rd
