= Mei Zhibin =

Chinese figure skater

Mei Zhibin (Chinese: 梅志滨, born 27 April 1963) is a former Chinese figure skater who competed at the 1988 Winter Olympics with her partner Li Wei. They finished last among the 14 pair skaters.
