= Zhao Xiaolei =

Chinese ice dancer

Personal information
- Born: August 3, 1966 (age 59) Heilongjiang, China

Figure skating career
- Country: China
Medal record
Figure skating: Ice dancing
Representing China
Asian Winter Games
Gold medal – first place	1986 Sapporo	Ice dancing

Zhao Xiaolei (born August 3, 1966, in Heilongjiang) is a Chinese ice dancer. He competed at two Winter Olympic Games with two different partners. With partner Liu Luyang, he is the 1986 Asian Winter Games champion. Liu & Zhao placed 19th at the 1988 Winter Olympics. With partner Xi Hongyan, he placed 19th at the 1984 Winter Olympics. He was 19 at the time.

== Results ==
(with Liu)

Event	1984–85	1985–86	1986–87	1987–88	1988–89	1989–90	1990–91
Winter Olympic Games				19th			
World Championship	18th						
Asian Winter Games		1st					
NHK Trophy			10th		8th	7th	9th
