= Liu Luyang =

Chinese figure skater

Personal information
- Born: June 10, 1976 (age 50)

Figure skating career
- Country: China
Medal record
Figure skating: Ice dancing
Representing China
Asian Winter Games
Gold medal – first place	1986 Sapporo	Ice dancing

Liu Luyang (born June 10, 1976) is a Chinese ice dancer. With partner Zhao Xiaolei, she is the 1986 Asian Winter Games champion. They placed 19th at the 1988 Winter Olympics and Liu was 11 years old at the time. Before teaming up with Zhao, she competed with Li Xiangdong. They placed 15th at the 1984 World Junior Figure Skating Championships which makes her date of birth highly dubious as she would have been only 7 years old if this was accurate.

== Results ==
(with Zhao)

Event	1984–85	1985–86	1986–87	1987–88	1988–89	1989–90	1990–91
Winter Olympic Games				19th			
World Championship	18th						
Asian Winter Games		1st					
NHK Trophy			10th		8th	7th	9th
