= Li Wei (figure skater) =

Chinese figure skater

Li Wei (Chinese: 李为, born 9 September 1969) is a former Chinese figure skater who competed at the 1988 Winter Olympics with his partner Mei Zhibin. They finished last among the 14 pair skaters.
