= 1985 Winter Universiade =

Multi-sport event in Belluno, Italy

XII Winter Universiade XXI Universiade invernale
- Host city: Belluno, Italy
- Events: 9 sports
- Opening: February 16, 1985
- Closing: February 24, 1985
- Opened by: Sandro Pertini
- Main venue: Piazza dei Martiri

The 1985 Winter Universiade, the XII Winter Universiade, took place in Belluno, Italy. The Soviet Union led in the medal standings.

== Medal table ==
* Host nation (Italy)

Rank	Nation	Gold	Silver	Bronze	Total
1	Soviet Union (URS)	7	3	4	14
2	Canada (CAN)	3	5	8	16
3	Italy (ITA)*	3	5	2	10
4	United States (USA)	3	4	2	9
5	Czechoslovakia (TCH)	3	4	1	8
6	China (CHN)	2	0	0	2
7	Yugoslavia (YUG)	1	1	1	3
8	Australia (AUS)	1	1	0	2
8	West Germany (FRG)	1	1	0	2
10	Spain (ESP)	1	0	2	3
11	France (FRA)	1	0	1	2
11	Japan (JPN)	1	0	1	2
11	Netherlands (NED)	1	0	1	2
14	Poland (POL)	0	2	1	3
15	East Germany (GDR)	0	1	1	2
16	Bulgaria (BUL)	0	1	0	1
17	Finland (FIN)	0	0	2	2
18	Austria (AUT)	0	0	1	1
Totals (18 entries)		28	28	28	84

=== Sports ===
- Alpine skiing (8)
- Cross-country skiing (6)
- Figure skating (4)
- Ice hockey (1)
- Nordic combined (1)
- Short track speed skating (8)
- Ski jumping (1)
