= Figure skating at the 2007 Asian Winter Games =

- Venue: Wuhuan Gymnasium
- Dates: 1–3 February 2007
- Competitors: 46 from 9 nations

Figure skating was featured as part of the 2007 Asian Winter Games at the Changchun Wuhuan Gymnasium in Changchun, China. Events were held from 1 February to 3 February 2007. Skaters competed in four disciplines: men's singles, ladies singles, pairs, and ice dance.

== Schedule ==
S	Short program	F	Free skating

Event↓/Date →	1st Thu	2nd Fri	3rd Sat
Men's singles	S		F
Women's singles	S	F	
Pairs		S	F
Ice dance	S	S	F

== Medalists ==
Event	Gold	Silver	Bronze
Men's singles	Xu Ming; China	Li Chengjiang; China	Kensuke Nakaniwa; Japan
Women's singles	Yukari Nakano; Japan	Fumie Suguri; Japan	Xu Binshu; China
Pairs	China; Zhao Hongbo; Shen Xue	China; Tong Jian; Pang Qing	China; Xu Jiankun; Li Jiaqi
Pairs	China; Zhao Hongbo; Shen Xue	China; Tong Jian; Pang Qing	Uzbekistan; Artem Knyazev; Marina Aganina
Ice dance	Japan; Akiyuki Kido; Nozomi Watanabe	China; Zheng Xun; Huang Xintong	China; Wang Chen; Yu Xiaoyang

== Medal table ==
Rank	Nation	Gold	Silver	Bronze	Total
1	China (CHN)	2	3	3	8
2	Japan (JPN)	2	1	1	4
3	Uzbekistan (UZB)	0	0	1	1
Totals (3 entries)		4	4	5	13

== Participating nations ==
A total of 46 athletes from 9 nations competed in figure skating at the 2007 Asian Winter Games:

- China (18)
- Chinese Taipei (1)
- Hong Kong (1)
- Japan (7)
- North Korea (6)
- Philippines (5)
- South Korea (4)
- Thailand (1)
- Uzbekistan (3)
