= Figure skating at the 1999 Asian Winter Games =

Figure skating at the 1996 Asian Winter Games
- Venue: Yongpyong Dome
- Dates: 3–5 February 1999
- Competitors: 38 from 7 nations

Figure skating at the 1999 Winter Asian Games took place in the Yongpyong Indoor Ice Rink, Yongpyong, Gangwon, South Korea with four events contested.

The competition took place from 3 to 5 February 1999.

== Schedule ==
S	Short program	F	Free skating

Event↓/Date →	3rd Wed		4th Thu	5th Fri
Men's singles	S		F	
Women's singles			S	F
Pairs	S			F
Ice dance	S	S	S	F

== Medalists ==
Event	Gold	Silver	Bronze
Men's singles	Li Chengjiang; China	Roman Skorniakov; Uzbekistan	Guo Zhengxin; China
Women's singles	Tatiana Malinina; Uzbekistan	Shizuka Arakawa; Japan	Fumie Suguri; Japan
Pairs	China; Zhao Hongbo; Shen Xue	Kazakhstan; Andrey Kryukov; Marina Khalturina	Uzbekistan; Evgeni Sviridov; Natalia Ponomareva
Ice dance	China; Zhang Wei; Wang Rui	Japan; Kenji Miyamoto; Rie Arikawa	South Korea; Lee Chuen-gun; Yang Tae-hwa

== Medal table ==
Rank	Nation	Gold	Silver	Bronze	Total
1	China (CHN)	3	0	1	4
2	Uzbekistan (UZB)	1	1	1	3
3	Japan (JPN)	0	2	1	3
4	Kazakhstan (KAZ)	0	1	0	1
5	South Korea (KOR)	0	0	1	1
Totals (5 entries)		4	4	4	12

== Participating nations ==
A total of 38 athletes from 7 nations competed in figure skating at the 1999 Asian Winter Games:

- China (8)
- Chinese Taipei (4)
- Hong Kong (2)
- Japan (10)
- Kazakhstan (3)
- South Korea (6)
- Uzbekistan (5)
