= Farkhutdinov =

Farkhutdinov or Farkhoutdinov (Russian: Фархутдинов) is a Russian masculine surname of Tatar origin, its feminine counterpart is Farkhutdinova or Farkhoutdinova. It may refer to

- Bakir Farkhutdinov (1925–2008), Russian weightlifter
- Igor Farkhutdinov (1950–2003), Russian statesman, governor of Sakhalin Oblast
- Rinat Farkhoutdinov (born 1975), Russian ice dancer
