= Philippines at the Asian Games =

- IOC code: PHI
- NOC: Philippine Olympic Committee
- Website: www.olympic.ph (in English)
- Medals Ranked 13th: Gold 75 Silver 125 Bronze 257 Total 457

Summer appearances
- 1951; 1954; 1958; 1962; 1966; 1970; 1974; 1978; 1982; 1986; 1990; 1994; 1998; 2002; 2006; 2010; 2014; 2018; 2022; 2026

Winter appearances
- 1990; 1996–2003; 2007; 2011; 2017; 2025; 2029

The Philippines is a member of the South East Asian Zone of the Olympic Council of Asia (OCA), and has participated in the Asian Games since their inception in 1951. The Philippine Olympic Committee, established in 1911, and recognized in 1929 by the International Olympic Committee, is the National Olympic Committee for Philippines.

The Philippines was one of the first five founding members of the Asian Games Federation on February 13, 1949, in New Delhi, the organization which was disbanded on November 26, 1981, and replaced by the Olympic Council of Asia.

== Membership of Olympic Council of Asia ==
The Philippines is a member of the South East Asian Zone of the Olympic Council of Asia (OCA), the continental association recognized by the International Olympic Committee.^{[a]} Being a member of the Southeast Asian Zone, the Philippines also participates in the Southeast Asian Games, a regional games for Southeast Asian nations.

The OCA organizes five major continental-level multi-sport events: the Asian Summer Games (more commonly known as the Asian Games), Asian Winter Games, Asian Indoor-Martial Arts Games, Asian Beach Games, and Asian Youth Games. Before 2009, Indoor and Martial Arts were two separate events, specialised for indoor and martial arts sports respectively. However, the two events was merged to form a single event known as the Asian Indoor-Martial Arts Games, which debuted in 2013 in Incheon, South Korea. As a member of OCA, the Philippines is privileged to participate in all these multi-sport events.

Games	Year	Host city	Opened by	Date	Sports	Events	Nations	Competitors	Top-ranked team	Rank	Ref
Asian Games
2	1954	Manila	Ramon Magsaysay (President)	1–9 May 1954	8	76	18	970	Japan (JPN)	2nd Place	

== Asian Games Results ==
Philippines is one of the only seven countries that have competed in all editions of the Asian Games. The other six are Indonesia, Japan, India, Sri Lanka, Singapore and Thailand. With a total of 457 medals, Philippines is currently ranked 13th at the all-time Asian Games medal table.

Asian Games
Games	Athletes	Gold	Silver	Bronze	Total	Medal Rank	Rank
(India) 1951 New Delhi	59	5	6	8	19	-	5
(Philippines) 1954 Manila	166	14	14	17	45	↑	2
(Japan) 1958 Tokyo	152	8	19	20	47	↓	2
(Indonesia) 1962 Jakarta	173	7	6	24	37	↓	5
(Thailand) 1966 Bangkok	173	2	15	25	42	↓	10
(Thailand) 1970 Bangkok	302	1	9	12	22	↓	11
(Iran) 1974 Tehran	47	0	2	12	14	↓	16
(Thailand) 1978 Bangkok	316	4	4	6	14	↑	9
(India) 1982 New Delhi	184	2	3	9	14	↓	10
(South Korea) 1986 Seoul	93	4	5	9	18	↑	6
(China) 1990 Beijing	285	1	2	7	10	↓	13
(Japan) 1994 Hiroshima	524	3	2	8	13	↑	14
(Thailand) 1998 Bangkok	386	1	5	12	18	↓	21
(South Korea) 2002 Busan	220	3	7	16	26	↑	18
(Qatar) 2006 Doha	233	4	6	9	19	↑	18
(China) 2010 Guangzhou	188	3	4	9	16	↓	19
(South Korea) 2014 Incheon	150	1	3	11	15	↓	22
(Indonesia) 2018 Jakarta-Palembang	271	4	2	15	21	↑	19
(China) 2022 Hangzhou	391	4	2	12	18	↑	17
(Japan) 2026 Aichi-Nagoya	440	4	9	16	29	-	17
(Qatar) 2030 Doha	Future event						
(Saudi Arabia) 2034 Riyadh	Future event						
Total	-	75	125	257	457	-	13

- Gold
- Silver
- Bronze

=== Medalists by sport ===
Updated after the 2026 Asian Games

Sport	Gold	Silver	Bronze	Total	Rank
Archery	0	1	1	2	11
Athletics	13	10	31	51	13
Basketball	5	2	2	9	3
Beach volleyball	0	0	1	1	7
Bowling	7	8	8	23	5
Boxing	15	11	31	57	5
Chess	0	1	0	1	7
Cue sports	4	4	1	9	4
Cycling	1	2	10	13	12
Dancesport	0	0	2	2	4
Diving	0	0	1	1	13
Equestrian	1	1	1	3	9
Esports	0	0	2	2	13
Golf	3	4	8	15	4
Gymnastics	2	0	1	3	8
Ju-jitsu	2	1	3	6	4
Judo	0	1	0	1	11
Karate	0	1	7	8	16
Mixed martial arts	0	1	1	2	7
Pencak silat	0	0	4	4	7
Roller sports	1	0	0	1	5
Rowing	0	0	1	1	16
Sailing	0	1	0	1	13
Sepak takraw	0	1	3	4	10
Shooting	5	12	15	32	10
Swimming	10	31	54	95	5
Taekwondo	1	7	26	34	10
Tennis	3	9	17	29	8
Volleyball	0	0	1	1	10
Weightlifting	1	5	4	10	15
Wrestling	0	2	2	4	16
Wushu	1	8	14	23	11
Total	75	125	257	457	13

== Asian Para Games Results ==
=== Medals by edition ===
Ranking is based on the Total Gold medals earned.

Asian Para Games
Games	Athletes	Gold	Silver	Bronze	Total	Rank
(China) Guangzhou 2010	35	0	4	3	7	21
(South Korea) Incheon 2014	40	0	5	5	10	24
(Indonesia) Jakarta 2018	57	10	8	11	29	11
(China) Hangzhou 2022	72	10	4	5	19	9
Total	204	20	21	24	65	14

=== Medalists by sport ===
Sport	Gold	Silver	Bronze	Total	Rank
Blind Chess	13	5	8	26	2
Para Athletics	1	3	2	6	22
Para Cycling	1	0	3	4	6
Powerlifting	0	5	1	6	17
Para Swimming	4	3	9	16	14
Para Table Tennis	0	2	1	3	13
Ten Pin Para Bowling	1	2	0	3	4
Wheelchair Dance sport	0	1	0	1	5
Total	20	21	24	65	14

== Asian Winter Games Results ==
The Philippines won its first Asian Winter Games medal; a gold in curling on February 14.

=== Medals by edition ===
Asian Winter Games
Games	Athletes	Gold	Silver	Bronze	Total	Rank
(Japan) Sapporo 1990	1	0	0	0	0	−
(China) Harbin 1996	Did not participate					
(South Korea) Gangwon 1999	Did not participate					
(Japan) Aomori 2003	Did not participate					
(China) Changchun 2007	5	0	0	0	0	−
(Kazakhstan) Astana−Almaty 2011	3	0	0	0	0	−
(Japan) Sapporo 2017	29	0	0	0	0	−
(China) Harbin 2025	19	1	0	0	1	5
(Kazakhstan) Almaty 2029	Future event					
Total	57	1	0	0	1	8

=== Medalists by sport ===
Sport	Gold	Silver	Bronze	Total	Rank
Curling	1	0	0	0	4
Total	1	0	0	0	14

== Asian Beach Games Results ==
The Philippines has sent its delegations to both editions of the Asian Beach Games—a biennial multi-sport event which features sporting events played on seaside beach. At the 2008 Games in Bali, the Philippines won a total of 10 medals, leading to the country finishing 21st in the medal table. The Philippines sent a delegation composed of 23 athletes for the 2010 Asian Beach Games held in Muscat, Oman from December 8 to 16, 2010. The Philippines was one of the 18 National Olympic Committees that did not win any medal in the Games.

=== Medals by edition ===
Ranking is based on the Total Gold medals earned.

Games	Athletes	Gold	Silver	Bronze	Total	Rank
(Indonesia) Bali 2008	-	0	2	8	10	21
(Oman) Muscat 2010	24	0	0	0	0	-
(China) Haiyang 2012	33	0	2	2	4	11
(Thailand) Phuket 2014	80	3	2	7	12	13
(Vietnam) Danang 2016	65	2	4	15	21	17
(China) Sanya 2026	101	3	4	2	9	5
Total	303	8	14	34	56	14

== Asian Indoor and Martial Arts Games Results ==
The Philippines has sent athletes to all editions of the Asian Indoor Games. In the 2005 Asian Indoor Games, held in Bangkok, Thailand, from November 12 to 19, 2005, the Philippines won total four medals, including a gold. Total six medals were won by Filipino athletes during the 2007 Games in Macau, held from October 26 to November 3, 2007. Filipino contingents gave the best performance, in terms of the total number of medals earned, during the 2009 Games held in Hanoi, Vietnam, from October 30 to November 8, winning 10 medals overall.

The Philippines competed in the First Asian Martial Arts Games held in Bangkok, Thailand, from August 1 to 9, 2009. The Philippines won total 18 medals (with two gold), and finished in the 12th spot. Jeffrey Figueroa won a gold in the bantamweight class of taekwondo after defeating Rezai Hasan of Afghanistan by 10–7 in the final. Another gold was won by Mary Jane Estimar in the sanshou 52 kg event of wushu. Estimar defeated Si Si Sein of Myanmar in the final by two to nil points difference.

=== Medals by edition ===
Ranking is based on the Total Gold medals earned.

Games	Athletes	Gold	Silver	Bronze	Total	Rank
Asian Indoor Games
(Thailand) Bangkok 2005	-	1	0	2	3	15
Macau 2007	-	1	2	3	6	19
(Vietnam) Hanoi 2009	23	1	4	5	10	20
Asian Martial Arts Games
(Thailand) Bangkok 2009	-	2	6	10	18	12
Asian Indoor and Martial Arts Games
(South Korea) Seoul 2013	40	1	0	2	3	18
(Turkmenistan) Ashgabat 2017	121	2	14	14	30	19
(Thailand) Bangkok/Chonburi 2021	Cancelled					
(Saudi Arabia) Riyadh 2025	Future event					
Total	-	8	26	35	69	18

== Afro-Asian Games Results ==
=== Medals by editions ===
Games	Athletes	Gold	Silver	Bronze	Total	Rank
(India) Hyderabad 2003	-	1	4	10	15	15
ALG Algiers 2007	Cancelled					
Total	-	1	4	10	15	15

== Asian Youth Games Results ==
The Philippines participated in the 2009 Asian Youth Games held in Singapore from June 29 to July 7, 2009. The Philippines earned two medals in the Games, but no gold, and finished in the 18th spot in the medal table.

=== Medals by editions ===
Games	Athletes	Gold	Silver	Bronze	Total	Rank
Singapore 2009	59	0	1	1	2	18
(China) Nanjing 2013	55	2	3	0	5	12
(Indonesia) Jakarta 2017	Cancelled					
(China) Shantou 2021	Cancelled					
Bahrain 2025	143	7	7	10	24	12
(Uzbekistan) Tashkent 2029	Future event					
Total	-	9	11	11	31	14

== Asian Youth Para Games Results ==
=== Medals by editions ===
Games	Athletes	Gold	Silver	Bronze	Total	Rank
(Japan) Tokyo 2009	Did not participate					
(Malaysia) Kuala Lumpur 2013	-	1	1	5	7	18
(United Arab Emirates) Dubai 2017	17	0	0	1	1	21
(Bahrain) Manama 2021	20	1	6	2	9	17
(United Arab Emirates) Dubai 2025	49	8	13	10	41	13
Total	-	10	20	18	38	14

== See also ==
- Philippines at the Olympics
- Philippines at the Southeast Asian Games

== Notes and references ==
Notes

- ^{a} The National Olympic Committees are all members of the Association of National Olympic Committees (ANOC), which is also split among five continental associations: Association of National Olympic Committees of Africa, Pan American Sports Organization, Olympic Council of Asia, European Olympic Committees, and Oceania National Olympic Committees.
