= Chuen-Gun Lee =

South Korean ice dancer (born 1980)

Personal information
- Born: October 26, 1980 (age 45) Seoul, Spouth Korea
- Height: 5 ft 10 in (1.78 m)

Figure skating career
- Country: South Korea; United States
- Retired: 2007
Medal record
Figure skating: Ice dance
Representing South Korea
Asian Winter Games
| Bronze medal – third place | 1999 Gangwon | Ice dancing |

Chuen-Gun "C.G." Lee (Korean: 이천군; RR: I Cheongun; born October 26, 1980) is a South Korean ice dancer who competed internationally for the United States. He was born in Seoul, South Korea. He competed for South Korea with Yang Tae-hwa. The two competed together from 1996 to 2002, placing 24th at the 2002 Winter Olympics. They were the first ice dancers from South Korea to compete in the Olympics.

Lee and Yang trained in the United States. Following that partnership, Lee partnered with American Kate Slattery, with whom he competed internationally for the United States. They were coached by Gennady Karponosov, Natalia Linichuk, and Vitaly Popkov. They announced their split on March 28, 2007. Lee now works as a coach, with both couples competing at Nationals and adult learners.

== Competitive highlights ==
=== For the United States ===
(with Kate Slattery for the United States)

| Event | 2004–05 | 2005–06 | 2006–07 |
|---|---|---|---|
| Bofrost Cup on Ice | 7th | | |
| Nebelhorn Trophy | | | 8th |
| U.S. Championships | 7th | WD | 11th |

- WD = Withdrew

=== For South Korea ===
(with Yang for South Korea)

| Event | 1995–96 | 1996–97 | 1997–98 | 1998–99 | 1999–00 | 2000–01 | 2001–02 |
|---|---|---|---|---|---|---|---|
| Winter Olympic Games | | | | | | | 24th |
| World Championships | | | | 31st | | 31st | 23rd |
| Four Continents Championships | | | | | | | 7th |
| World Junior Championships | 23rd | 25th | 21st | 28th | 20th | | |
| Asian Winter Games | | | | 3rd | | | |
| Winter Universiade | | | | | | 12th | |
| Golden Spin of Zagreb | | | | | | | 9th |
| Junior Grand Prix, Japan | | | | | 9th | | |
| Junior Grand Prix, Norway | | | | | 15th | | |
| South Korean Championships | | | 2nd | 1st | 1st | 1st | 1st |
