= Yang Tae-hwa =

South Korean ice dancer (born 1982)

Personal information
- Born: January 13, 1982 (age 44) Seoul
- Height: 155 cm (5.09 ft)

Figure skating career
- Country: South Korea
- Partner: Lee Chuen-gun
- Skating club: Dong Chun Winter Ice Academy
- Retired: 2002
Medal record
Figure skating
Representing South Korea
Asian Winter Games
Bronze medal – third place	1999 Gangwon	Ice dancing

- Yang Tae-hwa
- Hangul: 양태화
- RR: Yang Taehwa
- MR: Yang T'aehwa

Yang Tae-hwa (Korean: 양태화; born January 13, 1982) is a South Korean retired ice dancer. She was born in Seoul, South Korea. With partner Chuen-Gun Lee, she was the 1999–2002 South Korean national champion. They represented South Korea at the 2002 Winter Olympics, where they placed 24th. Their highest placement at an ISU Championship was 7th at the 2002 Four Continents Championships. Following the 2002 Olympic season, Yang retired from competitive skating.

She is an International Technical Specialist for South Korea.

== Competitive highlights ==
(with Lee)

Event	1995–96	1996–97	1997–98	1998–99	1999–2000	2000–01	2001–02
Winter Olympic Games							24th
World Championships				31st		31st	23rd
Four Continents Championships							7th
World Junior Championships	23rd	25th	21st	28th	20th		
Asian Winter Games				3rd			
Winter Universiade						12th	
Golden Spin of Zagreb							9th
Junior Grand Prix, Japan					9th		
Junior Grand Prix, Norway					15th		
South Korean Championships			1st	1st	1st	1st	1st
