= Xu Ming (figure skater) =

Chinese figure skater

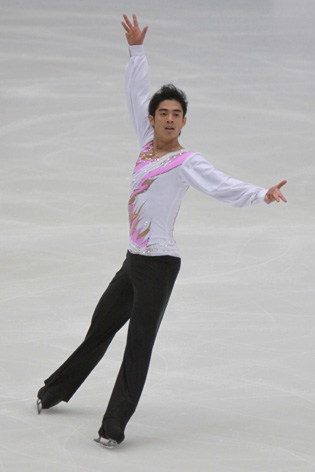
- Xu Ming in 2009.

Personal information
- Full name: Xu Ming
- Born: January 18, 1981 (age 45) Qiqihar
- Height: 1.74 m (5 ft 9 in)

Figure skating career
- Country: China
- Coach: Yu Lijie
- Skating club: Harbin Club
Medal record
Men's Figure skating
Representing China
Asian Winter Games
Gold medal – first place	2007 Changchun	Men's singles
Winter Universiade
Gold medal – first place	2009 Harbin	Men's singles
Bronze medal – third place	2007 Turin	Men's singles

Xu Ming (simplified Chinese: 徐铭; traditional Chinese: 徐銘; pinyin: Xú Míng; born January 18, 1981, in Qiqihar, Heilongjiang) is a Chinese former competitive figure skater. He is the 2009 Winter Universiade champion, the 2007 Asian Winter Games champion, and a four-time Chinese national silver medalist.

== Programs ==
Season	Short program	Free skating
2008–10	Crossfire by the Scorpions and the Berlin Philharmonic Orchestra	Warsaw Concerto by Richard Addinsell
2007–08	Tanguera by Mariano Mores	Warsaw Concerto by Richard Addinsell
2006–07	Kung Fu Hustle by Raymond Wong; Art on Ice by Edvin Marton	2046 by various composers

== Competitive highlights ==
GP: Grand Prix

International
Event	2005–06	2006–07	2007–08	2008–09	2009–10
Worlds		26th			
Four Continents		10th	11th		
GP Cup of China			10th	10th	12th
GP Cup of Russia			11th		
Universiade		3rd		1st	
Asian Games		1st			
National
Chinese Champ	2nd	2nd	2nd	4th	2nd
