= Figure skating at the 2007 Asian Winter Games – Ice dance =

Ice dance at the 2007 Asian Winter Games
- Venue: Wuhuan Gymnasium
- Dates: 1–3 February 2007
- Competitors: 8 from 2 nations

Medalists
| gold medal | Akiyuki Kido; Nozomi Watanabe | Japan |
| silver medal | Zheng Xun; Huang Xintong | China |
| bronze medal | Wang Chen; Yu Xiaoyang | China |

The mixed ice dancing figure skating at the 2007 Asian Winter Games was held on 1, 2 and 3 February 2007 at Changchun Wuhuan Gymnasium, China.

== Schedule ==
All times are China Standard Time (UTC+08:00)

| Date | Time | Event |
|---|---|---|
| Thursday, 1 February 2007 | 18:30 | Compulsory dance |
| Friday, 2 February 2007 | 19:35 | Original dance |
| Saturday, 3 February 2007 | 20:15 | Free dance |

== Results ==
| Rank | Team | CD | OD | FD | Total |
|---|---|---|---|---|---|
| 1st place, gold medalist(s) | Japan (JPN); Akiyuki Kido; Nozomi Watanabe | 28.16 | 46.80 | 76.97 | 151.93 |
| 2nd place, silver medalist(s) | China (CHN); Zheng Xun; Huang Xintong | 27.03 | 46.37 | 76.66 | 150.06 |
| 3rd place, bronze medalist(s) | China (CHN); Wang Chen; Yu Xiaoyang | 24.09 | 43.70 | 70.57 | 138.36 |
| 4 | China (CHN); Suo Bin; Liu Lu | 19.36 | 33.94 | 55.27 | 108.57 |
