= Figure skating at the 2007 Asian Winter Games – Men's singles =

Men's singles at the 2007 Asian Winter Games
- Venue: Wuhuan Gymnasium
- Dates: 1–3 February 2007
- Competitors: 10 from 6 nations

Medalists
gold medal	Xu Ming	China
silver medal	Li Chengjiang	China
bronze medal	Kensuke Nakaniwa	Japan

The men's singles figure skating at the 2007 Asian Winter Games was held on 1 and 3 February 2007 at Changchun Wuhuan Gymnasium, China.

== Schedule ==
All times are China Standard Time (UTC+08:00)

Date	Time	Event
Thursday, 1 February 2007	21:35	Short program
Saturday, 3 February 2007	18:30	Free skating

== Results ==
Rank	Athlete	SP	FS	Total
1st place, gold medalist(s)	Xu Ming (CHN)	66.00	128.19	194.19
2nd place, silver medalist(s)	Li Chengjiang (CHN)	62.64	121.56	184.20
3rd place, bronze medalist(s)	Kensuke Nakaniwa (JPN)	59.03	120.10	179.13
4	Takahiko Kozuka (JPN)	58.73	118.38	177.11
5	Wu Jialiang (CHN)	59.20	112.80	172.00
6	Ri Song-chol (PRK)	49.53	93.31	142.84
7	Lee Dong-whun (KOR)	43.22	96.70	139.92
8	Michael Novales (PHI)	36.40	71.82	108.22
9	Tatsuya Tanaka (HKG)	31.14	64.56	95.70
10	Jerico Lim (PHI)	29.15	61.53	90.68
