= Figure skating at the Asian Winter Games =

- Governing bodies: ISU (World) / ASU (Asia)
- Events: 4 (men: 1; women: 1; mixed: 2)

Games
- 1986; 1990; 1996; 1999; 2003; 2007; 2011; 2017; 2025
- Medalists

Figure skating has been contested at the Asian Winter Games since 1986. It was not included in 1990 because of conflicting with the 1990 World Figure Skating Championships.

== Editions ==
Games	Year	Host city	Best nation
I	1986	Sapporo, Japan	Japan
III	1996	Harbin, China	China
IV	1999	Gangwon, South Korea	China
V	2003	Aomori, Japan	Japan
VI	2007	Changchun, China	China
VII	2011	Astana–Almaty, Kazakhstan	China
VIII	2017	Sapporo, Japan	China
IX	2025	Harbin, China	South Korea

== Events ==
Event	86	96	99	03	07	11	17	25	Years
Men's singles	X	X	X	X	X	X	X	X	7
Women's singles	X	X	X	X	X	X	X	X	7
Pairs	X	X	X	X	X	X	X	X	7
Ice dance	X	X	X	X	X	X	X	X	7
Total	4	4	4	4	4	4	4	4	

== Medal table ==
Rank	Nation	Gold	Silver	Bronze	Total
1	China (CHN)	15	13	15	43
2	Japan (JPN)	9	14	9	32
3	South Korea (KOR)	3	0	2	5
4	Uzbekistan (UZB)	2	2	3	7
5	Kazakhstan (KAZ)	2	2	2	6
6	North Korea (PRK)	1	1	2	4
Totals (6 entries)		32	32	33	97

== Participating nations ==
Nation	86	96	99	03	07	11	17	25	Years
Australia							6		1
China	X	X	8	14	18	12	12	10	8
Chinese Taipei			4	1	1	3	3	1	6
Hong Kong			2		1	1	4	4	5
India							3	2	2
Indonesia							4	3	2
Japan	X	X	10	12	7	6	11	12	8
Kazakhstan		X	3			8	4	6	5
Kyrgyzstan							2	1	2
Malaysia						2	4	4	3
Mongolia						1		2	2
North Korea	X			4	6	5	2	3	6
Philippines					5	3	4	5	4
Singapore							2		1
South Korea	X	X	6	7	4	3	10	4	8
Thailand				4	1	3	2	2	5
Turkmenistan								2	1
United Arab Emirates							1		1
Uzbekistan		X	5	3	3	2	1	4	7
Number of nations			7	7	9	12	17	16	
Number of athletes			38	45	46	49	75	65	
