= Naoki Shigematsu =

Japanese figure skater (born 1977)

Personal information
- Born: December 24, 1977 (age 48) Kanagawa, Japan
- Height: 1.70 m (5 ft 7 in)

Figure skating career
- Country: Japan
- Skating club: Shinmatsudo D.O.S.C.
- Began skating: 1982
- Retired: 2000

Japanese name
- Kanji: 重松直樹
- Kana: しげまつ なおき
Transcriptions
- Romanization: Shigematsu Naoki

Naoki Shigematsu (重松 直樹, Shigematsu Naoki; born December 24, 1977) is a Japanese former competitive figure skater. He is the 1994 World Junior silver medalist and placed 23rd at the 1995 World Championships. He retired from competitive skating following the 2000 Four Continents Championships.

Shigematsu is a coach and choreographer who has worked with Takahito Mura, Rumi Suizu, Kento Nakamura, Risa Shoji, and Hirofumi Torii.

== Results ==
GP: Champions Series/Grand Prix

International
Event	93–94	94–95	95–96	96–97	97–98	98–99	99–00
Worlds		23rd					
Four Continents							14th
GP Cup of Russia				5th			
GP Lalique							11th
GP NHK Trophy						12th	
GP Skate Canada			14th				
GP Sparkassen						4th	
Asian Games						7th	
Universiade				9th			
International: Junior
Junior Worlds	2nd	8th	12th				
National
Japan Champ.		2nd	2nd	6th	2nd	2nd	3rd
Japan Junior	2nd	1st					
