= Figure skating at the 2007 Asian Winter Games – Pairs =

Pairs at the 2007 Asian Winter Games
- Venue: Wuhuan Gymnasium
- Dates: 2–3 February 2007
- Competitors: 12 from 3 nations

Medalists
gold medal	Zhao Hongbo; Shen Xue	China
silver medal	Tong Jian; Pang Qing	China
bronze medal	Xu Jiankun; Li Jiaqi	China
bronze medal	Artem Knyazev; Marina Aganina	Uzbekistan

The mixed pairs figure skating at the 2007 Asian Winter Games was held on 2 and 3 February 2007 at the Changchun Wuhuan Gymnasium, China.

== Schedule ==
All times are China Standard Time (UTC+08:00)

Date	Time	Event
Friday, 2 February 2007	18:30	Short program
Saturday, 3 February 2007	21:05	Free skating

== Results ==
Rank	Team	SP	FS	Total
1st place, gold medalist(s)	China (CHN); Zhao Hongbo; Shen Xue	69.49	126.06	195.55
2nd place, silver medalist(s)	China (CHN); Tong Jian; Pang Qing	65.65	115.82	181.47
3rd place, bronze medalist(s)	China (CHN); Xu Jiankun; Li Jiaqi	54.99	89.21	144.20
3rd place, bronze medalist(s)	Uzbekistan (UZB); Artem Knyazev; Marina Aganina	45.02	81.18	126.20
5	North Korea (PRK); Jong Yong-hyok; Sung Mi-hyang	45.09	78.04	123.13
6	North Korea (PRK); Sin Kwang-mun; Choe Ryon	41.55	70.90	112.45

- Uzbekistan was awarded bronze because of no three-medal sweep per country rule.
