= Yukiko Kawasaki =

Japanese figure skater

Personal information
- Other names: Yukiko Sedlmajer
- Born: 31 July 1977 (age 49)

Figure skating career
- Country: Japan
- Partner: Alexei Tikhonov
- Retired: 2000

Japanese name
- Kanji: 川崎 由紀子
- Kana: かわさき ゆきこ

Yukiko Sedlmajer, formerly Yukiko Kawasaki (川崎 由紀子, Kawasaki Yukiko; born July 31, 1977) is a Japanese former competitive figure skater who competed in both singles and pair skating. As a pair skater, she competed with Alexei Tikhonov for Japan. They are two-time Japanese national champions and won the bronze medal at the 1993 NHK Trophy. As a single skater, she competed internationally on the junior and senior levels.

Kawasaki turned professional in 2000. She performed in shows as a single skater and in an adagio team with her husband, Czech pair skater Marek Sedlmajer. After coaching at SKK Ostrov, Sporting Ghiaccio Artistico Pinzolo (Italy), Cristal Sapporo (Japan) and ASK Lovosice, she joined the coaching staff at Stadion Brno, in 2019.

== Competitive highlights ==
=== Single skating ===
International
Event	90–91	91–92	92–93	93–94	94–95	95–96	96–97	97–98	98–99	99–00
Asian Games									7th	
International: Junior
Junior Worlds	11th									
National
Japan						7th	12th	9th	11th	11th
Japan Junior	2nd	3rd		3rd	2nd					

=== Pair skating ===
(with Alexei Tikhonov for Japan)

International
Event	1992–1993	1993–1994
World Championships		15th
Nations Cup		4th
NHK Trophy		3rd
Piruetten		6th
National
Japan Championships	1st	1st
