= Nozomi Watanabe =

Japanese ice dancer

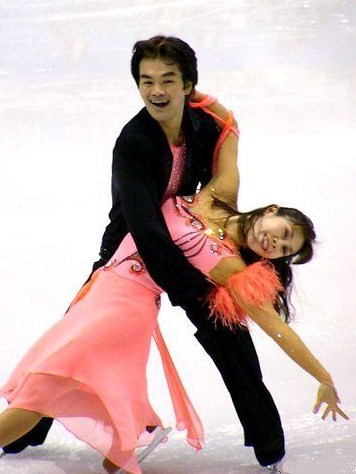
- Watanabe and Kido at the 2004 NHK Trophy

Personal information
- Native name: 渡辺 心
- Full name: Nozomi Watanabe
- Born: February 18, 1971 (age 55) Ōta, Tokyo
- Height: 1.58 m (5 ft 2 in)

Figure skating career
- Country: Japan
- Partner: Akiyuki Kido
- Skating club: Shinyokohama FSC
Medal record
Figure skating
Ice dancing
Representing Japan
Asian Winter Games
Gold medal – first place	2007 Changchun	Ice dancing
Silver medal – second place	2003 Aomori	Ice dancing

Japanese name
- Kanji: 渡辺 心
- Kana: わなたべ のぞみ
Transcriptions
- Romanization: Watanabe Nozomi

Nozomi Watanabe (渡辺 心, Watanabe Nozomi; born February 18, 1971 in Ōta, Tokyo) is a Japanese former ice dancer whose partner was Akiyuki Kido. They are the four-time Japanese national champions (2003–2006) and placed 15th at the 2006 Winter Olympics. They are also the 2003 Asian Winter Games silver medalists and 2007 Asian Winter Games champions. She now works as a coach.

== Career ==
Watanabe was born in Ōta, Tokyo and began skating at age 6. She began to train primarily in the United States at age 10, and at age 15, she began ice dance with Akiyuki Kido. They trained under Natalia Linichuk, Gennadi Karponosov, and J. Idemitsu in Newark, Delaware. She named Hungarian ice dancers Nóra Hoffmann and Attila Elek as a pair she was both friends and rivals with.

Watanabe and Kido debuted on the ISU Grand Prix series in 1997, placing 10th at the 1997 Skate Canada International and 11th at the 1997 NHK Trophy.

They won four consecutive titles at the Japan Championships from 2003 to 2006. In 2003, they competed at the Asian Winter Games and finished in second.

The pair competed at the 2006 Winter Olympics, where they placed 15th. The next month, at the 2006 World Championships, she and Kido collided with Hoffman and Elek while performing a lift, and Watanabe's blade struck Hoffman in the back; the collision also left her bleeding from the elbow. Watanabe said that they were unable to see the pair at the time of the collision and that she would apologize to them.

At the 2007 Asian Winter Games, they won the ice dancing event after leading in all competition segments; another Japanese pair would not do so until Utana Yoshida and Masaya Morita won the 2025 edition. Watanabe retired after the 2007 World Championships, held in her hometown of Tokyo, where the pair finished in 15th.

== Post-competitive career ==
Watanabe works as a coach at the Shin-Yokohama Skate Center. She has also commented on ice dance in the media.

== Results ==
GP: Champions Series / Grand Prix

with Kido

International
Event	95–96	96–97	97–98	98–99	99–00	00–01	01–02	02–03	03–04	04–05	05–06	06–07
Olympics											15th	
Worlds								20th	17th	16th	17th	15th
Four Continents				10th	8th	9th	9th	9th	5th	4th		
GP Cup of Russia										8th		
GP NHK Trophy			11th	10th	8th	12th	10th	10th	8th	8th	5th	5th
GP Skate America					8th			8th				7th
GP Skate Canada			10th	12th					8th			
GP Sparkassen						11th	9th					
Schäfer Memorial											4th	
Asian Games				4th				2nd				1st
National
Japan Champ.	4th	3rd	2nd	3rd	2nd	2nd	2nd	2nd	1st	1st	1st	1st
