= Tomoaki Koyama =

Japanese pair skater

Japanese name
- Kanji: 小山 朋昭
- Kana: こやま ともあき

Tomoaki Koyama (小山 朋昭, Koyama Tomoaki; born October 4, 1971 in Tokyo, Japan) is a Japanese pair skater who now works as an ISU Technical Specialist. Competing with Rena Inoue, he placed 14th in the 1992 Winter Olympic Games. They are two-time Japanese National Champions. He also competed as a single skater.

== Competitive highlights ==
=== Men's singles ===
International
Event	84–85	85–86	86–87	87–88	88–89	89–90	90–91	91–92	92–93	93–94
Nations Cup										12th
NHK Trophy										6th
International: Junior
Junior Worlds	12th	10th	12th		11th	10th				
National
Japan									2nd	
Japan Junior	3rd	1st	2nd	2nd	2nd	1st				

=== Pairs with Inoue ===
International
Event	1989–90	1990–91	1991–92
Winter Olympics			14th
World Championships		15th	
International de Paris			7th
NHK Trophy			7th
International: Junior
World Junior Championships	7th		
National
Japan Championships		1st	1st
