= Japan Junior Figure Skating Championships =

Annual figure skating competition

The Japan Junior Figure Skating Championships (Japanese: 全日本フィギュアスケートジュニア選手権) is a figure skating competition held annually to crown the national champions on the Junior level for Japan. It is the junior level equivalent of the Japan Figure Skating Championships. Skaters who place high enough at this competition can earn invitations to compete at the senior championships.

== History ==
The competition has been held since at least 1932; some medalist records have been lost. It was held in tandem with the senior-level Japan Figure Skating Championships through 1972, when it became a separate event. For much of the event's history, pairs and ice dance events were frequently not held.

== Junior medalists ==
=== Singles ===
Season	Location	Gold	Silver	Bronze	Ref.
1931–32	Shimosuwa	Akio Hasegawa	Tsuyuko Hiraoka	Tokudaiji	

In the 1931—1932 season, junior men and women competed in the same event.

=== Men ===
Season	Location	Gold	Silver	Bronze	Ref.
1930–31	Sendai	Toshikazu Katayama	Tsugio Hasegawa	Akio Hasegawa	
1932–33	Tokyo	Nagayoshi Kuroda	Shozo Hoshino	Shunji Togo	
1933–34	Osaka	Shozo Hoshino	Shunji Togo	Kenzo Hirose	
1934–35	Tokyo	Shozo Hoshino	Shunji Togo	Yoshinari Yamamoto	
1935–36	Tokyo	Ryusuke Arisaka	Fujimaru Shodoshima	Hideo Hada	
1936–37	Tokyo	Hiroshi Shimakawa	Tetsutaro Tanaka	Fujimaru Shodoshima	
1937–38	Tokyo	Tatsuo Kobayashi	Tetsutaro Tanaka	Yorio Iga	
1938–39	Tokyo	Tsukasa Kimura	Sakai Katsuyuki	Naoshige Shiota	
1939–40	Tokyo	Hachiro Ito	Genji Kondo	Naoshige Shiota	
1940–41	Tokyo	Eiichi Sato	Hideo Matsuoka	Shigeo Yasuda	
1941–46	No competitions due to World War II				
1946–47	Hachinohe	Not recorded			
1947–48	Morioka	Masami Kobayashi	Kashio Takizawa	Takayoshi Asanuma	
1948–49	Suwa	Competition cancelled			
1949–50	Tomakomai	Tatsujiro Kawashima	Sadao Okimoto	Hiroshi Tokue	
1950–51	Nikkō	Hiroshi Tokue	Not recorded		
1951–52	Tokyo	Hiroshi Okamoto	Masahiro Kobayashi	Yutaka Nakamura	
1952–53	Tokyo	Masayuki Unno	Hiroshi Tokue	Katsuicihro Hisanaga	
1953–54	Osaka	Kazuo Ohashi	Mikio Takeuchi	Hiroshi Kobayashi	
1954–55	Tokyo	Hisashi Kuchiki	Hisashi Murakami	Yutaka Doke	
1955–56	Kyoto	Yutaka Doke	Yasuhiro Iwata	Makoto Ito	
1956–57	Tokyo	Toshihiko Iwata	Naozo Wada	Yoshihiro Ichii	
1957–58	Tokyo	Tadashi Maeyama	Naozo Wada	Makoto Ito	
1958–59	Osaka	Kazuaki Konno	Kazuhiko Kakita	Shoichiro Tsuzuki	
1959–60	Tokyo	Shoichiro Tsuzuki	Kazuhiko Kakita	Hiroshi Bessho	
1960–61	Tokyo	Shimanji Usui	Hiroshi Bessho	Akio Takahashi	
1961–62	Osaka	Nobuhisa Matsumoto	Masakuni Terano	Yoshiaki Hattori	
1962–63	Tokyo	Yoshiaki Hattori	Nobuhisa Matsumoto	Yasuhiko Takahashi	
1963–64	Tokyo	Toshimitsu Doke	So Nagai	Nobuo Moriyama	
1964–65	Osaka	Katsutoshi Morinaga	Teruo Murase	Hiroshi Nagakubo	
1965–66	Tomakomai	Hiroshi Nagakubo	Masayasu Iguchi	Not recorded	
1966–67	Tokyo	Masayasu Iguchi	Osamu Takeuchi	Akio Murase	
1967–68	Tokyo	Yasusuke Sakai	Takashi Maruo	Teruki Okegawa	
1968–69	Tokyo	Teruki Okegawa	Takashi Maruo	Osamu Tanaka	
1969–70	Osaka	Yasuhiro Noto	Kazuo Naganuma	Hideo Yokoi	
1970–71	Tokyo	Mitsuru Matsumura	Yoshiteru Kagomoto	Takehiko Ibuki	
1971–72	Kyoto	Takehiko Ibuki	Fumio Igarashi	Shinji Someya	
1972–73	Mito	Shuho Kiyokawa	Hikotaro Kita	Hisao Ozaki	
1973–74	Kiryū	Hisao Ozaki	Takashi Mura	Morio Seki	
1974–75	Tokyo	Morio Seki	Nagao Kobayashi	Hiroshi Ishizawa	
1975–76	Kyoto	Ichiro Kondo	Atsushi Yamagawa	Akira Matsumoto	
1976–77	Toyohashi	Makoto Shiotani	Masaru Ogawa	Takehito Kozuka	
1977–78	Tokyo	Hiroyuki Oike	Masaaki Masuda	Takashi Yanagida	
1978–79	Chiba	Kenji Tanaka	Takashi Yanagida	Atsushi Oshima	
1979–80	Tokyo	Makoto Kano	Tatsuya Fuji	Hisao Otsuka	
1980–81	Nagano	Hiroshi Sugiyama	Kiyoshi Shintani	Mitsuaki Takeuchi	
1981–82	Ikaho	Atsushi Tezuka	Tetsuo Abe	Mitsuhiro Murata	
1982–83	Kobe	Mitsuhiro Murata	Mitsuaki Takeuchi	Masakazu Kabata	
1983–84	Kyoto	Hiroshi Sugiyama	Noritomo Taniuchi	Yoichi Yamazaki	
1984–85	Kobe	Hiroshi Sugiyama	Masakazu Kabata	Tomoaki Koyama	
1985–86	Kyoto	Tomoaki Koyama	Mitsuhiro Murata	Daisuke Nishikawa	
1986–87	Tokyo	Daisuke Nishikawa	Tomoaki Koyama	Yoshiaki Takeuchi	
1987–88	Kobe	Masakazu Kagiyama	Tomoaki Koyama	Kenta Iso	
1988–89	Chiba	Masakazu Kagiyama	Tomoaki Koyama	Fumihiro Oikawa	
1989–90	Tokyo	Tomoaki Koyama	Fumihiro Oikawa	Gaku Aiyoshi	
1990–91	Osaka	Fumihiro Oikawa	Gaku Aiyoshi	Shin Amano	
1991–92	Nagoya	Fumihiro Oikawa	Shin Amano	Gaku Aiyoshi	
1992–93	Maebashi	Gaku Aiyoshi	Seiichi Suzuki	Makoto Okazaki	
1993–94	Hiroshima	Makoto Okazaki	Naoki Shigematsu	Seiichi Suzuki	
1994–95	Kobe	Naoki Shigematsu	Seiichi Suzuki	Takashi Yamamoto	
1995–96	Kyoto	Takeshi Honda	Yamato Tamura	Yosuke Takeuchi	
1996–97	Yokohama	Yamato Tamura	Taijin Hiraike	Yosuke Takeuchi	
1997–98	Nagoya	Yosuke Takeuchi	Taijin Hiraike	Soshi Tanaka	
1998–99	Tomakomai	Yosuke Takeuchi	Kensuke Nakaniwa	Soshi Tanaka	
1999–00	Osaka	Eiji Iwamoto	Kensuke Nakaniwa	Daisuke Takahashi	
2000–01	Nagoya	Soshi Tanaka	Kazumi Kishimoto	Kensuke Nakaniwa	
2001–02	Tokyo	Daisuke Takahashi	Ryosuke Sasaki	Makoto Nakata	
2002–03	Nagoya	Ryo Shibata	Hirokazu Kobayashi	Nobunari Oda	
2003–04	Kyoto	Kazumi Kishimoto	Nobunari Oda	Yasuharu Nanri	
2004–05	Osaka	Nobunari Oda	Kazumi Kishimoto	Yasuharu Nanri	
2005–06	Nagano	Takahiko Kozuka	Takahito Mura	Ryo Shibata	
2006–07	Hiroshima	Tatsuki Machida	Takahito Mura	Hirofumi Torii	
2007–08	Sendai	Takahito Mura	Akio Sasaki	Yuzuru Hanyu	
2008–09	Nagoya	Yuzuru Hanyu	Tatsuki Machida	Daisuke Murakami	
2009–10	Yokohama	Yuzuru Hanyu	Kento Nakamura	Shoma Uno	
2010–11	Hitachinaka	Kento Nakamura	Ryuichi Kihara	Ryuju Hino	
2011–12	Hachinohe	Ryuju Hino	Keiji Tanaka	Ryuichi Kihara	
2012–13	Nishitōkyō, Tokyo	Ryuju Hino	Shoma Uno	Keiji Tanaka	
2013–14	Nagoya	Keiji Tanaka	Shoma Uno	Ryuju Hino	
2014–15	Niigata	Shoma Uno	Sota Yamamoto	Shu Nakamura	
2015–16	Hitachinaka	Sota Yamamoto	Kazuki Tomono	Daichi Miyata	
2016–17	Sapporo	Kazuki Tomono	Koshiro Shimada	Mitsuki Sumoto	
2017–18	Maebashi	Mitsuki Sumoto	Sena Miyake	Tatsuya Tsuboi	
2018–19	Fukuoka	Tatsuya Tsuboi	Shun Sato	Koshiro Shimada	
2019–20	Yokohama	Yuma Kagiyama	Shun Sato	Lucas Tsuyoshi Honda	
2020–21	Hachinohe	Lucas Tsuyoshi Honda	Kao Miura	Sena Miyake	
2021–22	Nagoya	Kao Miura	Tatsuya Tsuboi	Nozomu Yoshioka	
2022–23	Hitachinaka	Nozomu Yoshioka	Takeru Amine Kataise	Haruya Sasaki	
2023–24	Ōtsu	Shunsuke Nakamura	Rio Nakata	Tsudoi Suto	
2024–25	Hiroshima	Rio Nakata	Sena Takahashi	Taiga Nishino	
2025–26	Tokyo	Rio Nakata	Taiga Nishino	Daiya Ebihara	

=== Women ===
Season	Location	Gold	Silver	Bronze	Ref.
1932–33	Tokyo	Tsuyuko Hiraoka	Tamako Togo	Utako Mutsu	
1933–34	Osaka	Etsuko Inada	Tamako Togo	Mitsuko Tezuka	
1934–35	Tokyo	Kinuko Ueno	Yoshiko Tsukioka	Reiko Yorioka	
1935–36	Tokyo	Reiko Yorioka	Mitsuko Machida	Misako Shachi	
1936–37	Tokyo	Misako Shachi	Michiko Yano	Not recorded	
1937–38	Tokyo	Tsuyako Yamashita	Hifuko Nozawa	Fusae Fukutani	
1938–39	Tokyo	Tsuyako Yamashita	Tomiyo Sato	Yoshiko Kato	
1939–40	Tokyo	Tomiyo Sato	Reiko Kato	Yoshiko Kato	
1940–41	Tokyo	Not recorded			
1941–46	No competitions due to World War II				
1946–47	Hachinohe	Not recorded			
1947–48	Morioka	Nana Aeba	Sakiko Nomura	Not recorded	
1948–49	Suwa	Competition cancelled			
1949–50	Tomakomai	Yoshiko Kato	Not recorded		
1950–51	Nikkō	Kyoko Tokue	Not recorded		
1951–52	Tokyo	Not recorded			
1952–53	Tokyo	Hisako Honda	Emi Torio	Setsuko Hayasaki	
1953–54	Osaka	Yoko Midoro	Setsuko Hayasaki	Hisako Kudo	
1954–55	Tokyo	Hisako Kudo	Kazue Takahashi	Taeko Ishino	
1955–56	Kyoto	Yuri Mushiake	Taeko Ishino	Junko Onoda	
1956–57	Tokyo	Eiko Kaneko	Taeko Ishino	Emiko Oiwa	
1957–58	Tokyo	Tokiko Yoshihara	Kazue Takahashi	Emiko Oiwa	
1958–59	Osaka	Yoko Oiwa	Kiyoko Akiba	Yukiko Murakami	
1959–60	Tokyo	Yukiko Murakami	Kiyoko Akiba	Emiko Tanaka	
1960–61	Tokyo	Naoko Tamura	Ritsuko Tanaka	Not recorded	
1961–62	Osaka	Noriko Nakajima	Michiko Kasuya	Yukiko Murakami	
1962–63	Tokyo	Noriko Nakajima	Sanae Minematsu	Not recorded	
1963–64	Tokyo	Sanae Minematsu	Setsuko Miyairi	Noriko Shirota	
1964–65	Osaka	Yoko Ishikawa	Reiko Shimizu	Machiko Kitahara	
1965–66	Tomakomai	Machiko Kitahara	Sachiko Kobayashi	Noriko Harada	
1966–67	Tokyo	Utako Nagamitsu	Sachiko Kobayashi	Kotoe Nagasawa	
1967–68	Tokyo	Masako Sakai	Sachiko Kobayashi	Tomoko Nakanishi	
1968–69	Tokyo	Sachiko Kobayashi	Chikako Kasahara	Yukiko Harada	
1969–70	Osaka	Kuniko Kiyose	Keiko Achiwa	Kyoko Onoda	
1970–71	Tokyo	Miwako Ohashi	Shinobu Wataname	Hiromi Ueno	
1971–72	Kyoto	Emi Watanabe	Reiko Kobayashi	Mayumi Nakajima	
1972–73	Mito	Hisayo Fujiki	Eiko Azuchi	Yasuko Fujimura	
1973–74	Kiryū	Eiko Azuchi	Yoko Asaka	Yukimi Matsuo	
1974–75	Tokyo	Iguchi Eri	Ayumi Yamaguchi	Kyoko Hagiwara	
1975–76	Kyoto	Taemi Seo	Megumi Aotani	Eri Inada	
1976–77	Toyohashi	Junko Ito	Tomi Takayama	Masako Kato	
1977–78	Tokyo	Ikuko Tobimatsu	Megumi Yanagihara	Chiemi Tsuru	
1978–79	Chiba	Hiromi Mizuhara	Masae Miwa	Nobuko Hosokawa	
1979–80	Tokyo	Midori Ito	Sachie Yuki	Izumi Aotani	
1980–81	Nagano	Tomoko Kawakami	Mihoko Higuchi	Masako Kawai	
1981–82	Ikaho	Mari Asanuma	Kinuko Ohira	Miki Ohata	
1982–83	Kobe	Hisano Horibayashi	Emi Suzuki	Yukiko Kashihara	
1983–84	Kyoto	Midori Ito	Sachie Yuki	Izumi Aotani	
1984–85	Kobe	Izumi Aotani	Yukiko Kashihara	Masako Kawai	
1985–86	Kyoto	Mari Asanuma	Masako Kawai	Yukiko Kashihara	
1986–87	Tokyo	Kyoko Ina	Junko Yaginuma	Junko Suda	
1987–88	Kobe	Yukiko Kashihara	Junko Yaginuma	Mari Kobayashi	
1988–89	Chiba	Yuka Sato	Junko Yaginuma	Mari Kobayashi	
1989–90	Tokyo	Yuka Sato	Mari Kobayashi	Tomoko Kawabata	
1990–91	Osaka	Rena Inoue	Yukiko Kawasaki	Mari Kobayashi	
1991–92	Nagoya	Kumiko Koiwai	Rena Inoue	Yukiko Kawasaki	
1992–93	Maebashi	Rena Inoue	Kumiko Koiwai	Hanae Yokoya	
1993–94	Hiroshima	Hanae Yokoya	Rena Inoue	Yukiko Kawasaki	
1994–95	Kobe	Shizuka Arakawa	Yukiko Kawasaki	Lucinda Ruh	
1995–96	Kyoto	Shizuka Arakawa	Fumie Suguri	Kumiko Taneda	
1996–97	Yokohama	Shizuka Arakawa	Fumie Suguri	Yuka Kanazawa	
1997–98	Nagoya	Yuka Kanazawa	Yoshie Onda	Yuko Kawaguchi	
1998–99	Tomakomai	Chisato Shiina	Yoshie Onda	Akiko Suzuki	
1999–00	Osaka	Chisato Shiina	Yoshie Onda	Arisa Yamazaki	
2000–01	Nagoya	Yukari Nakano	Akiko Suzuki	Miki Ando	
2001–02	Tokyo	Miki Ando	Yukari Nakano	Yukina Ota	
2002–03	Nagoya	Miki Ando	Mai Asada	Yukina Ota	
2003–04	Kyoto	Miki Ando	Mai Asada	Aki Sawada	
2004–05	Osaka	Mao Asada	Mai Asada	Aki Sawada	
2005–06	Nagano	Aki Sawada	Nana Takeda	Akiko Kitamura	
2006–07	Hiroshima	Nana Takeda	Rumi Suizu	Satsuki Muramoto	
2007–08	Sendai	Rumi Suizu	Yuki Nishino	Shoko Ishikawa	
2008–09	Nagoya	Haruka Imai	Mari Suzuki	Kanako Murakami	
2009–10	Yokohama	Kanako Murakami	Haruka Imai	Yukiko Fujisawa	
2010–11	Hitachinaka	Risa Shoji	Kako Tomotaki	Miyabi Ohba	
2011–12	Hachinohe	Satoko Miyahara	Kako Tomotaki	Risa Shoji	
2012–13	Nishitōkyō, Tokyo	Satoko Miyahara	Riona Kato	Rika Hongo	
2013–14	Nagoya	Rika Hongo	Mai Mihara	Yura Matsuda	
2014–15	Niigata	Wakaba Higuchi	Kaori Sakamoto	Yuka Nagai	
2015–16	Hitachinaka	Wakaba Higuchi	Yuna Shiraiwa	Yuhana Yokoi	
2016–17	Sapporo	Kaori Sakamoto	Yuna Shiraiwa	Marin Honda	
2017–18	Maebashi	Rika Kihira	Mako Yamashita	Nana Araki	
2018–19	Fukuoka	Yuhana Yokoi	Nana Araki	Tomoe Kawabata	
2019–20	Yokohama	Mana Kawabe	Tomoe Kawabata	Hana Yoshida	
2020–21	Hachinohe	Rino Matsuike	Hana Yoshida	Mao Shimada	
2021–22	Nagoya	Mao Shimada	Rion Sumiyoshi	Mone Chiba	
2022–23	Hitachinaka	Mao Shimada	Mone Chiba	Ami Nakai	
2023–24	Ōtsu	Mao Shimada	Ikura Kushida	Rena Uezono	
2024–25	Hiroshima	Mao Shimada	Kaoruko Wada	Ikura Kushida	
2025–26	Tokyo	Mao Shimada	Mayuko Oka	Mei Okada	

=== Pairs ===
Season	Location	Gold	Silver	Bronze	Ref.
1959–60	Tokyo	Yukiko Murakami; Nagahisa Ono	No other competitors		
1960–61	Tokyo	Yoko Oiwa; Kazuhiko Kakita	Machiko Kinoshita; Takatsugu Hashiguchi	Mihoko Ogita; Koichi Kawamura	
1961–63	No pairs competitors				
1963–64	Tokyo	Komako Iwadate; Masayasu Iguchi	No other competitors		
1964–65	Osaka	Reiko Shimizu; Teruo Murase	No other competitors		
1965–70	No pairs competitors				
1970–71	Tokyo	Miko Maruyama; Hirokuni Ichijo	No other competitors		
1971–72	Kyoto	Natsuko Iwasaki; Etsuo Washino	No other competitors		
1972–74	No pairs competitors				
1974–75	Tokyo	Kyoko Hagiwara; Sumio Murata	Hamae Kato; Hiromichi Ogihara	Makoto Ishikawa; Masahiro Suga	
1975–79	No pairs competitors				
1979–80	Tokyo	Sakiko Seno; Nagao Kobayashi	No other competitors		
1980–85	No pairs competitors				
1986—87	Tokyo	Hikaru Tsuchino; Takaya Usuda	No other competitors		
1987–88	Kobe	Rena Inoue; Tomoaki Koyama	Hikaru Tsuchino; Takaya Usuda	No other competitors	
1988–89	Chiba	Yuki Shoji; Takaya Usuda	No other competitors		
1989–90	Tokyo	Rena Inoue; Tomoaki Koyama	No other competitors		
1990–91– 1997–98	No pairs competitors				
1998–99	Tomakomai	Makiko Ogasawara; Takeo Ogasawara	No other competitors		
1999–00	Osaka	Yuko Kawaguchi; Alexander Markuntsov	No other competitors		
2000–01– 2005–06	No pairs competitors				
2006–07	Hiroshima	Narumi Takahashi; Komei Yamada	No other competitors		
2007–08	Sendai	Narumi Takahashi; Mervin Tran	No other competitors		
2008–13	No pairs competitors				
2013–14	Saitama	Sumire Suto; Konstantin Chizhikov	Ami Koga; Francis Boudreau Audet	No other competitors	
2014–15	Nagano	Ami Koga; Francis Boudreau Audet	No other competitors		
2015–16	Hitachinaka	Riku Miura; Shoya Ichihashi	Yoshino Sekiguchi; Shunsuke Sekiguchi	No other competitors	
2016–17	Osaka	Riku Miura; Shoya Ichihashi	No other competitors		
2017–18	Maebashi	Riku Miura; Shoya Ichihashi	Marin Ono; Kurtis Kazuki Schreiber	No other competitors	
2018–22	No pairs competitors				
2022–23	Hitachinaka	Haruna Murakami; Sumitada Moriguchi	No other competitors		
2023–24	Ōtsu	Sae Shimizu; Lucas Tsuyoshi Honda	No other competitors		
2024–25	Hiroshima	Sae Shimizu; Lucas Tsuyoshi Honda	No other competitors		

=== Ice dancing ===
Season	Location	Gold	Silver	Bronze	Ref.
1959–60	Tokyo	Yukiko Murakami; Kozo Fujimori	No other competitors		
1960–61	Tokyo	Yoko Oiwa; Haruki Nakamura	Reiko Makino; Nobuhisa Matsumoto	Kiyomi Hosaka; Seinosuke Tobari	
1961–62	No ice dance competitors				
1962–63	Tokyo	Noriko Yuzawa; Nobuhisa Matsumoto	No other competitors		
1963–64	No ice dance competitors				
1964–65	Osaka	Reiko Inoue; Akimitsu Hirose	Michiko Kasuya; Teruo Kato	No other competitors	
1965–66	No ice dance competitors				
1966–67	Tokyo	Sachiko Kobayashi; Masao Ando	Aki Nanbu; Makiyuki Otake	Megumi Uchida; Toyoshi Koyama	
1967–68	Tokyo	Megumi Uchida; Toyoshi Koyama	Noriko Harada; Naotoshi Nishihama	Nobuko Rokkaku; Yasumasa Inokuma	
1968–69	Tokyo	Michiyo Yamada; Yasumasa Inokuma	Michiko Hosoya; Sakae Ishii	Tomoko Sekine; Teruki Hikawa	
1969–70	Osaka	Keiko Achiwa; Yasuhiro Noto	Taeko Hirose; Tadashi Kashiyama	Tomiko Naito; Hidetoshi Tsuyama	
1970–71	No ice dance competitors				
1971–72	Kyoto	Yoshiko Nakata; Hirohiko Komata	No other competitors		
1972–73	No ice dance competitors				
1973–74	Kiryū	Tomoko Koide; Chikara Hase	Misa Kage; Masanori Takeda	Miyuki Ishikawa; Hirofumi Kanekiyo	
1974–75	Tokyo	Michiko Kitakawa; Jun Nanbu	Sakiko Seno; Nozomu Sakai	Hisako Fujimoto; Yasushi Fujimoto	
1975–78	No ice dance competitors				
1978–79	Chiba	Sakiko Seno; Koji Inokuchi	Rumiko Michigami; Tanaka	Naoko Hoshino; Nobuhiko Yoshioka	
1979–80	Tokyo	Michie Yuki; Masao Kobayashi	No other competitors		
1980–81	Nagano	Etsuko Naito; Hiroaki Tokita	Hikako Tsuchida; Masaya Sato	No other competitors	
1981–82	Gunma	Aya Nakayama; Nagao Kobayashi	Kyoko Takei; Hirohisa Motoki	No other competitors	
1982–83	Kobe	Kaoru Takino; Kenji Takino	Kyoko Takei; Hirohisa Motoki	Hisaka Hasegawa; Hiroshi Kamiyama	
1983–87	No ice dance competitors				
1987–88	Kobe	Nakako Tsuzuki; Akiyuki Kido	No other competitors		
1988–89	Chiba	Nakako Tsuzuki; Akiyuki Kido	No other competitors		
1989–90	Tokyo	Nakako Tsuzuki; Akiyuki Kido	No other competitors		
1990–91	Osaka	Mari Kato; Daisuke Watanabe	Yuka Ishihara; Yosuke Moriwaki	No other competitors	
1991–92	Nagoya	Yuki Habuki; Akiyuki Kido	Aya Kawai; Hisashi Tsuchiya	Akiko Kinoshita; Hitoshi Koizumi	
1992–93	Maebashi	Yuki Habuki; Akiyuki Kido	Akiko Kinoshita; Hitoshi Koizumi	Aya Kawai; Hisashi Tsuchiya	
1993–94	Hiroshima	Akiko Kinoshita; Yosuke Moriwaki	Yukie Nogami; Daisuke Watanabe	No other competitors	
1994–95	Kobe	Akiko Kinoshita; Yosuke Moriwaki	Yukie Nogami; Daisuke Watanabe	No other competitors	
1995–96	Kyoto	Rie Arikawa; Kenji Miyamoto	Yukie Nogami; Daisuke Watanabe	Chizu Ogawa; Yasuo Ogawa	
1996–97	Yokohama	Chizu Ogawa; Yasuo Ogawa	Rie Arikawa; Kenji Miyamoto	Yukie Nogami; Daisuke Watanabe	
1997–98	Nagoya	Rie Arikawa; Kenji Miyamoto	Chizu Ogawa; Yasuo Ogawa	No other competitors	
1998–99	Tomakomai	Akiko Fukuzawa; Fumiaki Shimokawa	No other competitors		
1999–00	Osaka	Minami Sakacho; Tatsuya Sakacho	No other competitors		
2000–01	Nagoya	Minami Sakacho; Tatsuya Sakacho	Ikuko Chida; Atsushi Funabashi	No other competitors	
2001–02	Tokyo	Minami Sakacho; Tatsuya Sakacho	No other competitors		
2002–03	Nagoya	Minami Sakacho; Tatsuya Sakacho	No other competitors		
2003–04	Kyoto	Ikuko Chida; Ayato Yuzawa	No other competitors		
2004–05	Osaka	Rina Sawayama; Taiyo Mizutani	Miki Nakamura; Takahito Niwa	No other competitors	
2005–06	Nagano	Rina Sawayama; Taiyo Mizutani	Tamaho Sugimoto; Aran Ono	No other competitors	
2006–07	Hiroshima	Rina Sawayama; Taiyo Mizutani	No other competitors		
2007–08	Sendai	Haruka Maeda; Taiyo Mizutani	Nana Sugiki; Ayato Yuzawa	Kaede Hara; Kokoro Mizutani	
2008–09	Nagoya	Nana Sugiki; Taiyo Mizutani	Kaede Hara; Kokoro Mizutani	No other competitors	
2009–10	Yokohama	Misato Komatsubara; Kokoro Mizutani	No other competitors		
2010–11	Hitachinaka	Misato Komatsubara; Kokoro Mizutani	No other competitors		
2011–12	Kadoma, Osaka	Misato Komatsubara; Kaoru Tsuji	No other competitors		
2012–13	Nishitōkyō, Tokyo	Nana Sugiki; Hiroichi Noguchi	No other competitors		
2013–14	Nagoya	Shizuru Agata; Kentaro Suzuki	Kumiko Maeda; Aru Tateno	No other competitors	
2014–15	Niigata	Rikako Fukase; Aru Tateno	Ayumi Takanami; Daiki Shimazaki	No other competitors	
2015–16	Hitachinaka	Rikako Fukase; Aru Tateno	Kumiko Maeda; Junya Watanaba	Himesato Hirayama; Kenta Azuma	
2016–17	Sapporo	Rikako Fukase; Aru Tateno	Yuka Orihara; Kanata Mori	Haruno Yajima; Daiki Shimazaki	
2017–18	Maebashi	Haruno Yajima; Daiki Shimazaki	Kiria Hirayama; Kenta Higashi	Ayumi Takanami; Yoshimitsu Ikeda	
2018–19	Fukuoka	Ayumi Takanami; Yoshimitsu Ikeda	Mai Kashino; Yuhi Kashino	No other competitors	
2019–20	Yokohama	Utana Yoshida; Shingo Nishiyama	Ayumi Takanami; Yoshimitsu Ikeda	No other competitors	
2020–21	Hachinohe	Utana Yoshida; Shingo Nishiyama	Ayano Sasaki; Atsuhiko Tamura	Kaho Yamashita; Yuto Nagata	
2021–22	Nagoya	Nao Kida; Masaya Morita	Ayano Sasaki; Atsuhiko Tamura	Kaho Yamashita; Yuto Nagata	
2022–23	Hitachinaka	Nao Kida; Masaya Morita	Sara Kishimoto; Atsuhiko Tamura	Kaho Yamashita; Yuto Nagata	
2023–24	Ōtsu	Sara Kishimoto; Atsuhiko Tamura	Kaho Yamashita; Yuto Nagata	No other competitors	
2024–25	Hiroshima	Sara Kishimoto; Atsuhiko Tamura	Sumire Yoshida; Ibuki Ogahara	Kaho Yamashita; Yuto Nagata	
2025–26	Tokyo	Kaho Yamashita; Yuto Nagata	Ayumi Shibayama; Tomoki Kimura	Sumire Yoshida; Ibuki Ogahara	

== See also ==
- Japan Figure Skating Championships
