= Akiyuki Kido =

Japanese ice dancer

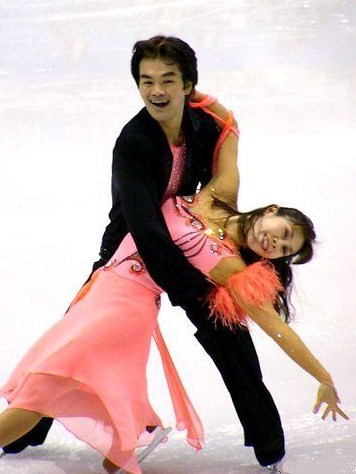
- Watanabe and Kido at the 2004 NHK Trophy

Personal information
- Full name: Akiyuki Kido
- Born: August 28, 1975 (age 51) Matsudo, Chiba, Japan
- Height: 1.74 m (5 ft 9 in)

Figure skating career
- Country: Japan
- Partner: Nozomi Watanabe; Nakako Tsuzuki (formerly)
- Coach: Natalia Linichuk (formerly); Gennadi Karponossov (formerly); Natalia Linichuk (former choreographer)
- Skating club: Shinyokohama FSC
Medal record
Figure skating
Ice dancing
Representing Japan
Asian Winter Games
Gold medal – first place	2007 Changchun	Ice dancing
Silver medal – second place	2003 Aomori	Ice dancing

Japanese name
- Kanji: 木戸 章之
- Kana: きど あきゆき
Transcriptions
- Romanization: Kido Akiyuki

Akiyuki Kido (木戸 章之, Kido Akiyuki; born August 28, 1975) is a Japanese former ice dancer. He competed with Nozomi Watanabe. They are the four-time Japanese national champions (2003–2006) and placed 15th at the 2006 Winter Olympics. They are also the 2003 Asian Winter Games silver medalists and 2007 Asian Winter Games champions. He now works as a coach.

== Career ==
Kido began skating around age 8 or 9, an age typically considered late for the sport, in his hometown of Matsudo. He spent most of his time indoors reading books, so his parents decided to enroll him in sports. Kido said that while swimming was popular at the time, he wanted to take up a different sport, which led him to ice skating.

Around age 11, it was suggested he try ice dance because his coach's daughter was also training in the sport. Through middle school, he competed in both ice dance and single skating. A knee injury forced him to stop training for some time, and when he resumed skating in high school, he focused only on ice dance.

Kido won three consecutive national junior titles from 1987 to 1989 with Nakako Tsuzuki. With his next parter, Yuki Habuki, he won the 1991 and 1992 junior national titles. He then partnered with Nozomi Watanabe while he was in university. They trained under Natalia Linichuk, Gennadi Karponosov, and J. Idemitsu in Newark, Delaware.

Watanabe and Kido debuted on the ISU Grand Prix series in 1997, placing 10th at the 1997 Skate Canada International and 11th at the 1997 NHK Trophy.

They won four consecutive titles at the Japan Championships from 2003 to 2006. In 2003, they competed at the Asian Winter Games and finished in second.

The pair competed at the 2006 Winter Olympics, where they placed 15th. The next month, at the 2006 World Championships, he and Watanabe collided with Nóra Hoffmann and Attila Elek while performing a lift, and Watanabe's blade struck Hoffman in the back; the collision also left her bleeding from the elbow. Watanabe said that they were unable to see the pair at the time of the collision and that she would apologize to them.

At the 2007 Asian Winter Games, they won the ice dancing event after leading in all competition segments; another Japanese pair would not do so until Utana Yoshida and Masaya Morita won the 2025 edition. Kido retired after the 2007 World Championships, where the pair finished in 15th.

== Career ==
Kido graduated from the University of Tsukuba. He now works as a coach in Shin-Yokohama. He has also commented on ice dance for the media.

== Results ==
GP: Champions Series / Grand Prix

=== With Watanabe ===
International
Event	95–96	96–97	97–98	98–99	99–00	00–01	01–02	02–03	03–04	04–05	05–06	06–07
Olympics											15th	
Worlds								20th	17th	16th	17th	15th
Four Continents				10th	8th	9th	9th	9th	5th	4th		
GP Cup of Russia										8th		
GP NHK Trophy			11th	10th	8th	12th	10th	10th	8th	8th	5th	5th
GP Skate America					8th			8th				7th
GP Skate Canada			10th	12th					8th			
GP Sparkassen						11th	9th					
Schäfer Memorial											4th	
Asian Games				4th				2nd				1st
National
Japan Champ.	4th	3rd	2nd	3rd	2nd	2nd	2nd	2nd	1st	1st	1st	1st

=== With Habuki ===
International
Event	1991–92	1992–93
World Junior Championships	18th	15th
National
Japan Junior Championships	1st	1st

=== With Tsuzuki ===
National
Event	1987–88	1988–89	1989–90
Japan Junior Championships	1st	1st	1st
