= Nakako Tsuzuki =

Japanese ice dancer (born 1975)

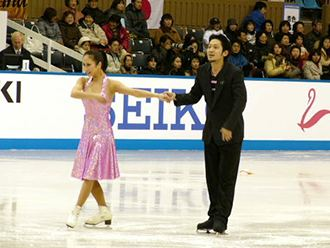
- Tsuzuki and Miyamoto in 2003.

Personal information
- Born: October 3, 1975 (age 51) Tokyo, Japan
- Height: 1.62 m (5 ft 4 in)

Figure skating career
- Country: Japan
- Partner: Kenji Miyamoto, Rinat Farkhoutinov, Juris Razgulajevs, Kazu Nakamura, Akiyuki Kido
- Coach: Muriel Zazoui, Romain Haguenauer, Tatiana Tarasova, Nikolai Morozov, Natalia Dubova, Viktor Ryzhkin
- Skating club: Kyoto Aqua Club
- Began skating: 1982
- Retired: 2006

Japanese name
- Kanji: 都築 奈加子
- Kana: つづき なかこ
Transcriptions
- Romanization: Tsuzuki Nakako

Nakako Tsuzuki (都築 奈加子, Tsuzuki Nakako; born October 3, 1975) is a Japanese former competitive ice dancer. A six-time Japanese national champion, she competed at five World Championships and six Four Continents Championships. Her father, Shoichiro Tsuzuki, is a figure skating coach.

== Career ==
=== Early years ===
Tsuzuki began learning to skate in 1982. She skated at least three seasons with Akiyuki Kido, competing on the junior level. They ended their partnership c. 1990.

=== Partnership with Nakamura ===
By 1991, Tsuzuki had teamed up with Kazu Nakamura to compete in the senior ranks. The duo won the Japanese national title in 1993–1994 and placed 24th at the 1994 World Championships in Chiba, Japan. They parted ways at the end of the season.

=== Partnership with Razgulajevs ===
Later in 1994, Tsuzuki formed a partnership with Juris Razgulajevs. Winners of two Japanese national titles, they placed 5th at the 1995 NHK Trophy and 16th at the 1996 World Championships in Edmonton, Alberta, Canada.

=== Partnership with Farkhoutdinov ===
Tsuzuki teamed up with Rinat Farkhoutdinov around 1998. Early in their partnership, they were coached by Natalia Dubova and Viktor Ryzhkin.

After winning the Japanese national title, Tsuzuki/Farkhoutdinov placed 6th at the 1999 Four Continents Championships in Halifax, Nova Scotia, Canada, and 20th at the 1999 World Championships in Helsinki, Finland.

They repeated as national champions the following season. The two placed 7th at the 2000 Four Continents Championships in Osaka, Japan, and then 18th at the 2000 World Championships in Nice, France.

By the 2000–2001 season, Tsuzuki/Farkhoutdinov had changed coaches to Tatiana Tarasova and Nikolai Morozov in Newington, Connecticut. After competing at their first Grand Prix assignments, they finished 7th at the 2001 Four Continents Championships in Salt Lake City, Utah, United States, and 24th at the 2001 World Championships in Vancouver, British Columbia, Canada.

The duo appeared at two more Grand Prix events. The Skate Canada International in November 2001 was their final competition together.

=== Partnership with Miyamoto ===
In mid-2003, Tsuzuki teamed up with Kenji Miyamoto. During their three-season partnership, they competed together at six Grand Prix events and placed in the top ten at three Four Continents Championships. They were coached by Muriel Zazoui in Lyon, France.

Tsuzuki retired from competitive skating following the 2005–2006 season.

== Programs ==
=== With Miyamoto ===
Season	Original dance	Free dance
2005–2006	Samba; Rhumba; Mambo	House of Flying Daggers by Shigeru Umebayashi
2004–2005	Charleston; Slow foxtrot; Quickstep	Tango; Quidam (from Cirque du Soleil)
2003–2004	Boogie-woogie; Blues; Boogie-woogie	The Prince of Egypt by Hans Zimmer

=== With Farkhoutdinov ===
Season	Original dance	Free dance
2001–2002	Tango; Spanish waltz	The Prince of Egypt by Hans Zimmer
2000–2001	Quickstep: Dancin' Fool by Frank Zappa; Foxtrot: Fever by Otis Blackwell, Eddie Cooley	Swan Lake by Pyotr Ilyich Tchaikovsky

== Results ==
GP: Champions Series / Grand Prix

=== With Miyamoto ===
International
Event	03–04	04–05	05–06
Four Continents Championships	9th	8th	8th
GP Cup of Russia	11th		11th
GP NHK Trophy	10th	9th	11th
GP Trophée Éric Bompard		11th	
National
Japan Championships	2nd	2nd	2nd

=== With Farkhoutdinov ===
International
Event	98–99	99–00	00–01	01–02
World Championships	20th	18th	24th	
Four Continents Champ.	6th	7th	7th	
GP NHK Trophy			10th	
GP Skate America			10th	10th
GP Skate Canada				10th
Japan Open		3rd	3rd	
National
Japan Championships	1st	1st	1st	

=== With Razgulajevs ===
International
Event	1994–95	1995–96
World Championships		16th
GP NHK Trophy		5th
National
Japan Championships	1st	1st

=== With Nakamura ===
International
Event	1991–92	1992–93	1993–94
World Championships			24th
Nations Cup			10th
NHK Trophy			9th
National
Japan Championships	3rd	2nd	1st

=== With Kido ===
National
Event	1987–88	1988–89	1989–90
Japan Junior Championships	1st	1st	1st
