= Figure skating at the 1999 Asian Winter Games – Men's singles =

Men's singles at the 1999 Asian Winter Games
- Venue: Yongpyong Dome
- Dates: 3–4 February 1999
- Competitors: 12 from 7 nations

Medalists
gold medal	Li Chengjiang	China
silver medal	Roman Skorniakov	Uzbekistan
bronze medal	Guo Zhengxin	China

The men's singles figure skating at the 1999 Asian Winter Games was held on 3 and 4 February 1999 at the Yongpyong Indoor Ice Rink, South Korea.

== Schedule ==
All times are Korea Standard Time (UTC+09:00)

Date	Time	Event
Wednesday, 3 February 1999	15:00	Short program
Thursday, 4 February 1999	18:30	Free skating

== Results ==
Rank	Athlete	SP	FS	Total
1st place, gold medalist(s)	Li Chengjiang (CHN)	1	1	1.5
2nd place, silver medalist(s)	Roman Skorniakov (UZB)	3	2	3.5
3rd place, bronze medalist(s)	Guo Zhengxin (CHN)	2	3	4.0
4	Lee Kyu-hyun (KOR)	5	5	7.5
5	Seiichi Suzuki (JPN)	8	4	8.0
6	Yuriy Litvinov (KAZ)	6	6	9.0
7	Naoki Shigematsu (JPN)	4	7	9.0
8	Taijin Hiraike (JPN)	7	8	11.5
9	David Liu (TPE)	9	9	13.5
10	Park Joon-ho (KOR)	10	10	15.0
11	Derek Leung (HKG)	11	11	16.5
12	Cheng Chung Shing (HKG)	12	12	18.0
