= Shoya Ichihashi =

Japanese pair skater (born 1997)

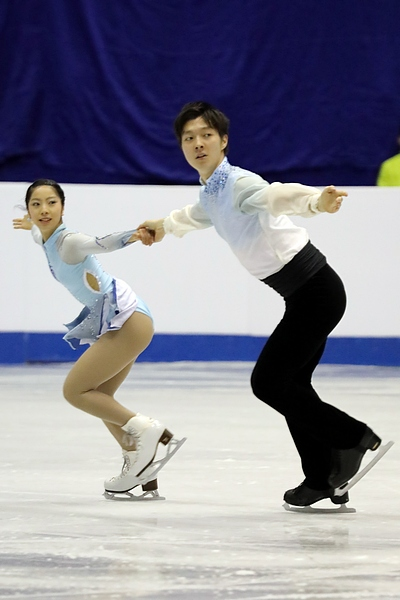
- Ichihashi with Miura at the 2017 World Junior Championships

Personal information
- Native name: 市橋 翔哉
- Born: November 5, 1997 (age 29) Hiroshima, Japan
- Home town: Takatsuki, Osaka, Japan
- Height: 1.75 m (5 ft 9 in)

Figure skating career
- Country: Japan
- Partner: Miyu Yunoki
- Coach: Narumi Takahashi
- Skating club: Kansai University
- Began skating: 2007
Medal record
Pairs' figure skating
Representing Japan (with Miura)
World Team Trophy
Silver medal – second place	2019 Fukuoka	Team

Shoya Ichihashi (Japanese: 市橋 翔哉; born November 5, 1997) is a Japanese pair skater. With his skating partner, Miyu Yunoki, he was the 2022 Japanese national champion.

With his former partner, Riku Miura, he represented Japan at four ISU Championships. The two finished tenth at the 2018 Four Continents Championships in Taipei, Taiwan, and at the 2018 World Junior Championships in Sofia, Bulgaria.

== Programs ==
(with Yunoki)

Season	Short program	Free skating
2021–2022	Black Car by Leon Else	Exogenesis: Symphony Part 3 (Redemption) by Muse

(with Miura)

Season	Short program	Free skating
2018–2019	Cry Me a River choreo. by Julie Marcotte	Warsaw Concerto by Richard Addinsell choreo. by Valérie Saurette
2017–2018	Miss Saigon by Claude-Michel Schönberg	Warsaw Concerto by Richard Addinsell choreo. by Valérie Saurette
2016–2017	Miss Saigon by Claude-Michel Schönberg	Charlie Chaplin films

== Competitive highlights ==
CS: Challenger Series; JGP: Junior Grand Prix

=== Pairs with Yunoki ===
International
Event	21–22	22–23
CS Nebelhorn		10th
National
Japan Champ.	1st	
Western Sect.	1st	
TBD = Assigned; WD = Withdrew

=== Pairs with Miura ===
International
Event	15–16	16–17	17–18	18–19
Four Continents			10th	
CS Golden Spin			6th	
International: Junior
Junior Worlds		13th	10th	14th
JGP Austria				7th
JGP Canada				4th
JGP Latvia			10th	
JGP Poland			10th	
Bavarian Open	7th			
Toruń Cup		1st		
National
Japan Champ.			3rd	WD
Japan Jr. Champ.	1st	1st		
Western Sect.	1st J	1st J	1st J	1st J
Team events
World Team Trophy				2nd T 6th P
J = Junior level

=== Men's singles ===
National
Event	08–09	09–10	10–11	11–12	12–13	13–14	14–15	15–16	16–17	20–21
Japan Junior Champ.			26th			24th		WD	25th	
Japan Novice Champ.	9th B	12th A	4th A							
Western Sect.						14th J	15th J	14th J	15th J	13th
Kinki Reg.						6th J	6th J	5th J	4th J	8th
Levels: A = Novice A; B = Novice B; J = Junior. WD = Withdrew
