= Kensuke Nakaniwa =

Japanese figure skater

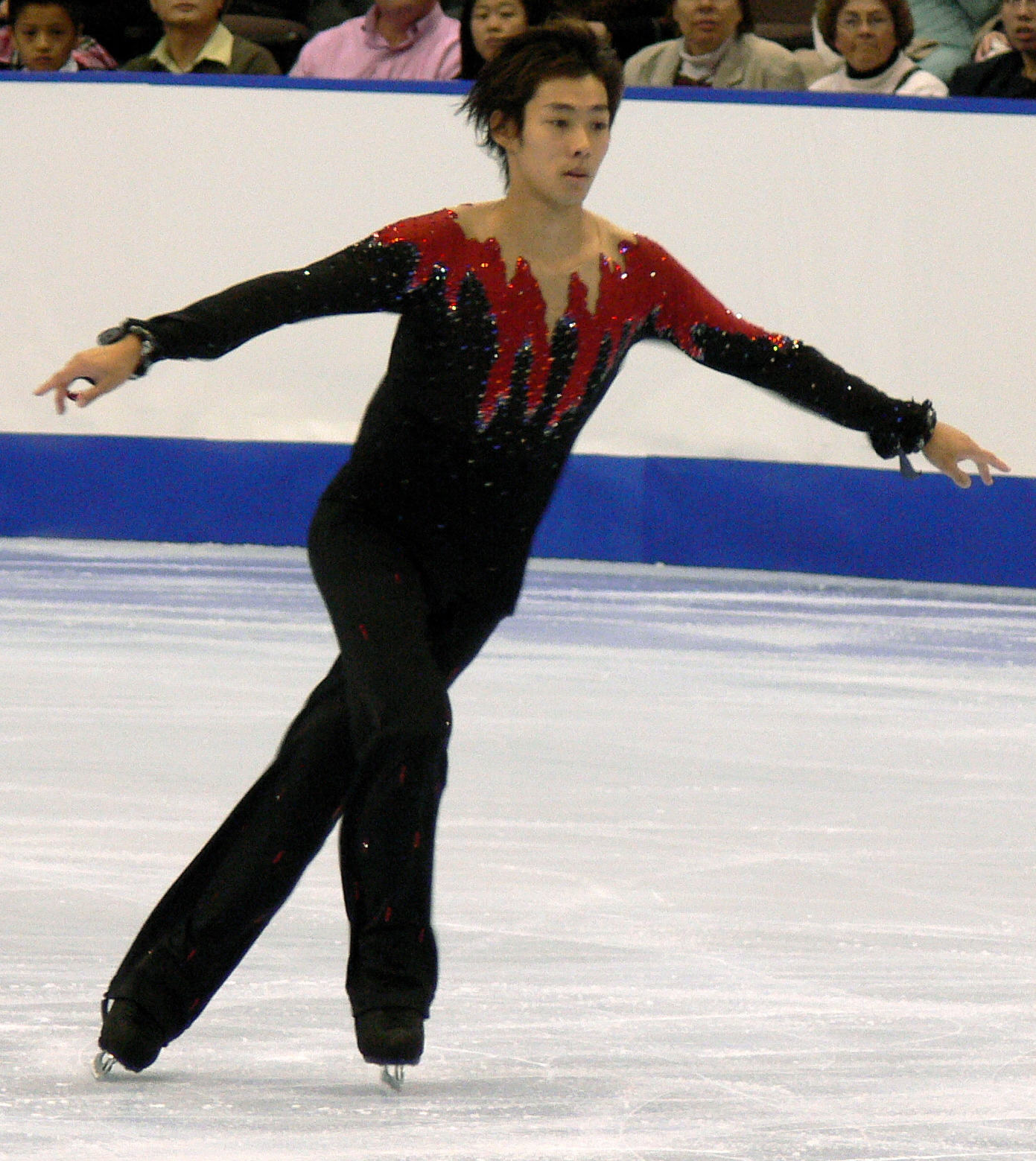
- Nakaniwa at the 2006 U.S. Figure Skating Campbell's Cup

Personal information
- Native name: 中庭 健介
- Born: October 15, 1981 (age 45) Fukuoka, Japan
- Height: 1.70 m (5 ft 7 in)

Figure skating career
- Country: Japan
- Skating club: Papio Fukuoka; Fukuoka University; Kashii Fukuoka
- Began skating: 1990
- Retired: 2011
Medal record
Men's figure skating
Representing Japan
Asian Winter Games
Bronze medal – third place	2007 Changchun	Men's singles

Kensuke Nakaniwa (中庭 健介, Nakaniwa Kensuke; born October 15, 1981) is a Japanese figure skating coach and former competitive singles skater. He is a two-time Ondrej Nepela Memorial champion, the 2003 Winter Universiade bronze medalist, the 2007 Asian Winter Games bronze medalist, and a three-time Japan national medalist. He finished in the top ten at three Four Continents Championships.

== Early life ==
Nakaniwa was born on October 15, 1981, in Fukuoka, Japan.

== Competitive career ==
Nakaniwa began skating around age 8, in his second year of elementary school, and started training seriously the next year. He also played softball, baseball, and soccer.

Around the first year of junior high school, he asked if he was quit, and he was told that he could do so once he qualified to the Japan Junior Championships. He did not accomplish this in his first junior season but did in his second; he finished 13th. However, at the Championships, he asked another skater how he could get a national team jersey and was told that if he placed at least 6th, he would be given one and would be allowed to compete in overseas events. Nakaniwa said that the conversation motivated him to continue training and improving rather than quitting as he had planned. The next year, in the 1996–1997 season, he placed 6th at the national junior championships.

In the 1999–2000 season, Nakaniwa won a bronze medal on the ISU Junior Grand Prix series and placed 13th at the 2000 World Junior Championships.

During the 2001–02 season, Nakaniwa made his Grand Prix debut at 2001 Skate America, where he landed his first quadruple jump in competition. The next season, he spent a month training in Canada, where he worked with choreographer David Wilson on improving his ability to understand music. He also won a bronze medal at the 2003 Winter Universiade and competed at his first senior ISU Championship, the 2003 Four Continents, where he finished 11th.

In the 2004–2005 season, he was the silver medalist at the Japan Championships, his best placement there during his career.

In February 2007, he competed at the 2007 Asian Winter Games, where he won the bronze medal. Later that year, at the 2007 Japan Championships, he placed 3rd in the short program but fell to fourth after the free skate. He missed earning a berth to the World Championships, at which he never competed, by less than a point. Nakaniwa later blamed himself for lacking drive, which he saw as holding him back from medaling at major competitions or winning berths to the World Championships or Winter Olympics.

Nakaniwa retired from competitive figure skating in January 2011, having spent his last season acting as an assistant coach and experimenting with training techniques for his future coaching career.

== Coaching career ==
Following his competitive career, Nakaniwa became a figure skating coach. Initially, he coached at his hometown rink in Fukuoka before relocating to Chiba in 2021 when he became the head coach of the newly established MF Figure Skating Academy. Nakaniwa has described his coaching style as one of maintaining a conversation with his students rather than ordering them, after he spent his first year of coaching using a harsher approach, which he found was counterproductive. He also focuses on helping skaters improve their ability to practice independently when not in lessons.

Nakaniwa's current and former students include:

- Yuna Aoki
- Hana Bath
- Maria Egawa
- Sei Kawahara
- Karin Miyazaki
- Ryoto Mori
- Ami Nakai
- Rio Nakata
- Shin Ji-a
- Tsudoi Suto
- Yo Takagi
- Rinka Watanabe

== Programs ==
Season	Short program	Free skating	Exhibition
2008–09	Cinema Paradiso by Ennio Morricone, Andrea Morricone	Braveheart by James Horner	You Are So Beautiful
2007–08	Sarabande (modern arrangement) by George Frideric Handel	Braveheart by James Horner	
2006–07	Concierto de Aranjuez by Joaquín Rodrigo	Slow Dancing in the Big City by Bill Conti	
2005–06	Sarabande by George Frideric Handel	The Lord of the Rings: The Fellowship of the Ring; The Return of the King by Howard Shore	
2004–05	Summer (from The Four Seasons) by Antonio Vivaldi	The Lord of the Rings: The Fellowship of the Ring; The Return of the King by Howard Shore	
2003–04	Romeo and Juliet	The Lord of the Rings by Howard Shore	
2002–03	The Four Seasons by Antonio Vivaldi	Cornish Rhapsody by Hubert Bath	
2001–02	Romeo and Juliet by Pyotr Ilyich Tchaikovsky	Gettysburg by Randy Edelman	

== Competitive highlights ==
GP: Grand Prix; JGP: Junior Grand Prix

International
Event	96–97	97–98	98–99	99–00	00–01	01–02	02–03	03–04	04–05	05–06	06–07	07–08	08–09	09–10	10–11
Four Continents							11th		8th	6th	8th	12th			
GP Bompard												7th			
GP Cup of China											5th		10th		
GP Cup of Russia							8th	10th							
GP NHK Trophy								11th	8th			8th			
GP Skate America						12th	10th								
Universiade					9th		3rd		4th						
Asian Games											3rd				
Golden Spin										7th					
Merano Cup														7th	
Nepela Memorial													1st	1st	
NRW Trophy													5th		6th
International: Junior
Junior Worlds				13th											
JGP Bulgaria			10th												
JGP Canada				3rd											
JGP China			10th												
JGP Germany		13th													
JGP Japan				8th											
JGP Mexico					10th										
JGP Norway					13th										
National
Japan				9th	5th	4th	3rd	6th	2nd	3rd	5th	4th	6th	12th	9th
Japan Junior	6th	5th	2nd	2nd	3rd										
J. = Junior level
