= Luan Bo =

Chinese figure skater

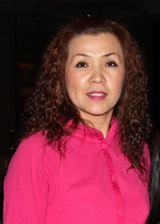

Personal information
- Full name: Luan Bo
- Born: April 16, 1965 (age 61) Harbin
- Height: 1.62 m (5 ft 4 in)

Figure skating career
- Country: China
- Partner: Yao Bin
- Retired: 1984

Luan Bo
- Traditional Chinese: 欒波
- Simplified Chinese: 栾波
Transcriptions
Standard Mandarin
- Hanyu Pinyin: Luán Bō

Luan Bo (born April 16, 1965 in Harbin, Heilongjiang) is a Chinese figure skating coach and former competitive pair skater. With partner Yao Bin, she was the first pair skater to represent China at the World Figure Skating Championships.

In the closed society of mid-20th century China, Luan and Yao had only photographs from which to learn their moves. At the 1980 World Figure Skating Championships in Dortmund, West Germany, they finished 15th, in last place. They competed at the World Championships twice more in 1981 and 1982, finishing last both times. They represented China at the 1984 Winter Olympics and placed 15th.

She works as a coach. Her current and former students include Ding Yang & Ren Zhongfei, Sui Wenjing & Han Cong, and Zhu Qiuying.

== Competitive highlights ==
(with Yao Bin)

Event	1979–1980	1980–1981	1981–1982	1982–1983	1983–1984
Winter Olympic Games					15th
World Championships	15th	11th	13th		
Winter Universiade				3rd	
