= Kazumi Kishimoto =

Japanese figure skater

Personal information
- Born: June 29, 1986 (age 40) Yokohama, Japan
- Height: 1.66 m (5 ft 5 1/2 in)

Figure skating career
- Country: Japan
- Began skating: 1993
- Retired: 2006

Japanese name
- Kanji: 岸本一美
- Kana: きしもと かずみ
Transcriptions
- Romanization: Kishimoto Kazumi

Kazumi Kishimoto (岸本 一美, Kishimoto Kazumi; born June 29, 1986) is a Japanese former competitive figure skater. He won two medals on the ISU Junior Grand Prix series and placed as high as fourth at the World Junior Championships. He finished tenth at the 2005 Four Continents Championships.

== Programs ==
Season	Short program	Free skating
2005–06	Zatōichi by Keiichi Suzuki	Arabian music
2004–05	Zatōichi by Keiichi Suzuki	Arabian music
2003–04	All That Jazz (from Chicago) by Kander and Ebb	Ketushi
2002–03	All That Jazz (from Chicago) by Kander and Ebb	The Mission by Ennio Morricone
2000–01	Dragonheart by Randy Edelman	Gettysburg by Randy Edelman

== Results ==
GP: Grand Prix; JGP: Junior Grand Prix

International
Event	98–99	99–00	00–01	01–02	02–03	03–04	04–05	05–06
Four Continents							10th	
GP Cup of China								11th
International: Junior
Junior Worlds			14th		4th	6th		
JGP Bulgaria						4th		
JGP China							3rd	
JGP Japan						2nd		
JGP Romania							4th	
JGP Serbia					8th			
Mladost Trophy				1st J				
National
Japan Champ.			13th		16th	2nd	5th	
Japan Junior		10th	2nd	5th	4th	1st	2nd	
Japan Novice	3rd A							
J: Junior level
