= Yukiko Kashihara =

Japanese figure skater

Personal information
- Born: September 8, 1971 (age 55) Kobe, Hyōgo Prefecture

Figure skating career
- Country: Japan
- Retired: 1990

Japanese name
- Kanji: 柏原由紀子
- Kana: かしはら ゆきこ
Transcriptions
- Romanization: Kashihara Yukiko

Yukiko Kashihara (柏原 由紀子, Kashihara Yukiko; born September 8, 1971) is a Japanese retired competitive figure skater. She is the 1988 World Junior bronze medalist and the 1988 Japanese national bronze medalist.

== Results ==
International
Event	82–83	83–84	84–85	85–86	86–87	87–88	88–89	89–90
NHK Trophy							6th	
Skate Canada						6th	5th	
International: Junior
Junior Worlds			10th			3rd		
National
Japan Champ.				5th	3rd	6th	5th	5th
Japan Jr. Champ.	3rd		2nd	3rd		1st		
