= Guo Zhengxin =

Chinese figure skater (born 1979)

Personal information
- Born: August 1, 1979 (age 46) Harbin, China
- Height: 1.74 m (5 ft 8 1/2 in)

Figure skating career
- Country: China
- Skating club: Harbin Skating Club
- Began skating: 1985
- Retired: 2002
Medal record
Figure skating: Men's singles
Representing China
Asian Winter Games
Gold medal – first place	1996 Harbin	Singles
Bronze medal – third place	1999 Ganwon	Singles

Guo Zhengxin (Chinese: 郭政新, born August 1, 1979) is a Chinese former competitive figure skater who competed in men's singles. He finished 8th at the 1998 Winter Olympics and 7th at the World Figure Skating Championships the following year. He was the first skater to land two quadruple toe loops in the free skate.

== Programs ==
Season	Short program	Free skating
2001–02	Children of Captain Grant by Isaak Dunayevsky	Blue Turban by Fateema; Mighty Guack; Egyptian Acoustics

== Results ==
GP: Champions Series/Grand Prix

International
Event	95–96	96–97	97–98	98–99	99–00	00–01	01–02
Olympics			8th				
Worlds	26th	19th	12th	7th	8th		
Four Continents				8th			12th
GP Final					5th		
GP Cup of Russia					3rd	WD	
GP Lalique			8th				
GP NHK Trophy		6th	3rd				
GP Skate America						WD	
GP Sparkassen					2nd		
Asian Games	1st			3rd			
International: Junior
Junior Worlds	3rd	3rd					
National
Chinese Champ.				3rd			
WD: Withdrew
