= Rumi Suizu =

Japanese figure skater

Japanese name
- Kanji: 水津 瑠美
- Kana: すいづ るみ

Rumi Suizu
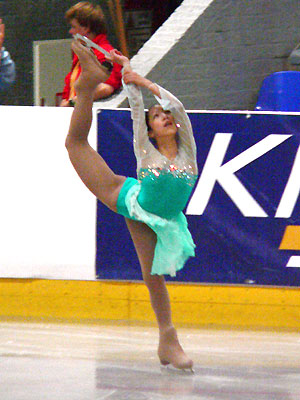
- Suizu in 2006.

Personal information
- Full name: Rumi Suizu
- Born: December 7, 1990 (age 35) London, England
- Home town: Tokyo, Japan
- Height: 1.59 m (5 ft 3 in)

Figure skating career
- Country: Japan
- Coach: Naoki Shigematsu
- Skating club: Komaba Gakuen High School
- Began skating: 1993
- Retired: 2010

Rumi Suizu (水津 瑠美, Suizu Rumi; born December 7, 1990 in London, England) is a Japanese former competitive figure skater. She is the 2007 Japan Junior champion and placed 5th at the 2007 World Junior Championships. She won five ISU Junior Grand Prix medals.

== Programs ==
Season	Short program	Free skating	Exhibition
2008–09	Spanish Caravan by Isaac Albéniz	Malagueña by Ernesto Lecuona	
2007–08	Spanish Caravan by Isaac Albéniz	Strange Paradise (after Borodin) by Magnus Fiennes performed by Bond; Kismet by Bond	
2006–07	Liebestraum by Franz Liszt	Mission: Impossible by Hans Zimmer	Dreaming of You by Celine Dion

== Competitive highlights ==
International
Event	01–02	02–03	03–04	04–05	05–06	06–07	07–08	08–09	09–10	10–11
Junior Worlds						5th	16th			
JGP Final						8th				
JGP Bulgaria					5th					
JGP Germany							3rd			
JGP Hungary						2nd				
JGP Italy								2nd		
JGP Japan					5th					
JGP Netherlands						3rd				
JGP Romania							3rd			
JGP South Africa								10th		
JGP USA				4th						
Gardena					2nd J					
Mladost Trophy		1st N								
National
Japan Champ.						11th	11th		23rd	27th
Japan Junior			13th	6th	4th	2nd	1st	23rd		
Japan Novice	3rd B	5th A	4th A							
Levels – J: Junior; N: Novice; JGP: Junior Grand Prix
