= Figure skating at the 2007 Asian Winter Games – Women's singles =

Women's singles at the 2007 Asian Winter Games
- Venue: Wuhuan Gymnasium
- Dates: 1–2 February 2007
- Competitors: 16 from 8 nations

Medalists
gold medal	Yukari Nakano	Japan
silver medal	Fumie Suguri	Japan
bronze medal	Xu Binshu	China

The women's singles figure skating at the 2007 Asian Winter Games was held on 1 and 2 February 2007 at Changchun Wuhuan Gymnasium, China.

== Schedule ==
All times are China Standard Time (UTC+08:00)

Date	Time	Event
Thursday, 1 February 2007	19:05	Short program
Friday, 2 February 2007	20:20	Free skating

== Results ==
Legend

- WD — Withdrawn

Rank	Athlete	SP	FS	Total
1st place, gold medalist(s)	Yukari Nakano (JPN)	57.36	105.22	162.38
2nd place, silver medalist(s)	Fumie Suguri (JPN)	58.50	103.55	162.05
3rd place, bronze medalist(s)	Xu Binshu (CHN)	55.22	103.80	159.02
4	Fang Dan (CHN)	51.65	93.81	145.46
5	Aki Sawada (JPN)	47.43	91.55	138.98
6	Anastasia Gimazetdinova (UZB)	47.67	83.04	130.71
7	Liu Yan (CHN)	42.20	87.96	130.16
8	Shin Yea-ji (KOR)	41.02	84.56	125.58
9	Choi Ji-eun (KOR)	43.30	71.34	114.64
10	Sin Na-hee (KOR)	43.72	70.52	114.24
11	Charissa Tansomboon (THA)	25.10	54.82	79.92
12	Gracielle Tan (PHI)	26.28	46.20	72.48
13	Tsai Hsin-hui (TPE)	20.92	39.03	59.95
14	Anne Clarisse Roman (PHI)	17.36	41.51	58.87
15	Ramina Palaca (PHI)	15.38	31.43	46.81
—	Kim Yong-suk (PRK)			WD
