= Figure skating at the 1999 Asian Winter Games – Women's singles =

Women's singles at the 1999 Asian Winter Games
- Venue: Yongpyong Dome
- Dates: 4–5 February 1999
- Competitors: 12 from 5 nations

Medalists
gold medal	Tatiana Malinina	Uzbekistan
silver medal	Shizuka Arakawa	Japan
bronze medal	Fumie Suguri	Japan

The women's singles figure skating at the 1999 Asian Winter Games was held on 4 and 5 February 1999 at Yongpyong Indoor Ice Rink, South Korea.

== Schedule ==
All times are Korea Standard Time (UTC+09:00)

Date	Time	Event
Thursday, 4 February 1999	15:00	Short program
Friday, 5 February 1999	18:00	Free skating

== Results ==
Rank	Athlete	SP	FS	Total
1st place, gold medalist(s)	Tatiana Malinina (UZB)	2	1	2.0
2nd place, silver medalist(s)	Shizuka Arakawa (JPN)	1	2	2.5
3rd place, bronze medalist(s)	Fumie Suguri (JPN)	3	3	4.5
4	Jung Min-ju (KOR)	6	4	7.0
5	Anastasia Gimazetdinova (UZB)	4	5	7.0
6	Wang Huan (CHN)	7	6	9.5
7	Yukiko Kawasaki (JPN)	5	7	9.5
8	Shin Yea-ji (KOR)	8	8	12.0
9	Wang Qingyun (CHN)	9	9	13.5
10	Dow-Jane Chi (TPE)	10	10	15.0
11	Guinevere Chang (TPE)	11	11	16.5
12	Anny Hou (TPE)	12	12	18.0
