= Philippines at the 2011 Asian Winter Games =

- IOC code: PHI
- NOC: Philippine Olympic Committee
- Website: www.olympic.ph (in English)

in Astana and Almaty
- Competitors: 3 in 1 sport
- Flag bearer: Zhaira Costiniano
- Medals: Gold 0 Silver 0 Bronze 0 Total 0

Asian Winter Games appearances
- 1990; 1996–2003; 2007; 2011; 2017; 2025; 2029

The Philippines participated in the 2011 Asian Winter Games in Almaty and Astana, Kazakhstan from January 30, 2011, to February 6, 2011. The nation sent 3 athletes

== Figure skating ==
Men

Athlete(s)	Event	SP/SP		FS/LP		Total	
Athlete(s)	Event	Points	Rank	Points	Rank	Points	Rank
Clint Eguia	Men's	33.43	13	74.89	12	108.32	12

Women

Athlete(s)	Event	SP/SP		FS/LP		Total	
Athlete(s)	Event	Points	Rank	Points	Rank	Points	Rank
Zhaira Costiniano	Ladies'	41.27	7	80.83	7	122.10	7
Mericien Venzon	Ladies'	31.95	12	61.69	12	93.64	11
