= Kento Nakamura =

Japanese figure skater (born 1991)

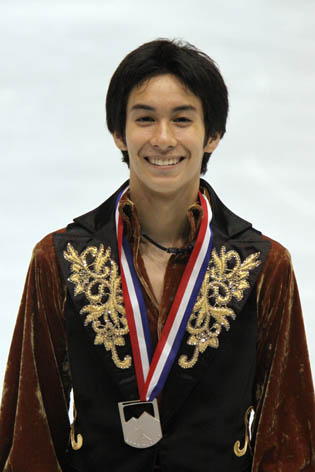
- Nakamura at the 2009 JGP Lake Placid

Personal information
- Born: October 16, 1991 (age 35) Matsudo, Chiba, Japan
- Height: 1.74 m (5 ft 8 1/2 in)

Figure skating career
- Country: Japan
- Coach: Yutaka Higuchi
- Skating club: Rikkyo University (St. Paul's University)
- Began skating: 1998

Kento Nakamura (中村健人, Nakamura Kento; born October 16, 1991) is a Japanese former competitive figure skater. He is the 2011 NRW Trophy bronze medalist, the 2013 Bavarian Open silver medalist, a two-time medalist on the ISU Junior Grand Prix series, and the 2011 Japan junior national champion.

== Career ==
Nakamura began skating at age 7. He debuted on the ISU Junior Grand Prix (JGP) series in 2007. In 2009, he won medals at both of his JGP assignments — silver in the United States and bronze in Turkey. His results qualified him for the ISU Junior Grand Prix Final, where he finished eighth. After ranking seventh on the senior level at the Japan Championships, he was assigned to the 2010 Four Continents Championships and placed 15th.

In the 2010–11 season, Nakamura finished off the podium at his JGP events but won the Japan Junior Championships. He was sent to the 2011 World Junior Championships and finished 14th.

Nakamura won bronze at the 2011 NRW Trophy and silver at the 2013 Bavarian Open.

== Programs ==
Season	Short program	Free skating
2013–14	Vizir (from "Gypsy Fashion")	Piano Concerto No.5 by Ludwig van Beethoven
2012–13	Vizir (from "Gypsy Fashion")	Symphony No. 3 in C minor op. 78 "Organ" by Camille Saint-Saëns
2011–12	Tango Fugata by Astor Piazzolla	Symphony No. 3 in C minor op. 78 "Organ" by Camille Saint-Saëns
2010–11	Bugle Call Rag	Malagueña by Ernesto Lecuona
2009–10	The Mission by Ennio Morricone	Poeta by Vicente Amigo; Intermezzo from Carmen by Georges Bizet
2007–08	Symphony No. 3 "Organ" by Camille Saint-Saëns	Pirates of the Caribbean by Klaus Badelt

== Competitive highlights ==
JGP: Junior Grand Prix

International
Event	04–05	05–06	06–07	07–08	08–09	09–10	10–11	11–12	12–13	13–14
Four Continents						15th				
Finlandia									7th	8th
NRW Trophy								3rd		
Ondrej Nepela								6th		
Bavarian Open									2nd	
International: Junior
Junior Worlds							14th			
JGP Final						8th				
JGP Czech Rep.							8th			
JGP Japan							9th			
JGP Romania				10th						
JGP Turkey						3rd				
JGP USA						2nd				
Mladost Trophy										
National
Japan Champ.					11th	7th	8th	8th	6th	11th
Japan Junior	27th	19th	8th	14th	4th	2nd	1st			
