= Kung Fu Hustle (soundtrack) =

2004–5 soundtrack releases

The soundtrack to the film Kung Fu Hustle was released in 2004 and 2005 in conjunction with the 2004 Hong Kong-Chinese martial arts film directed by and starring Stephen Chow. The majority of the film's original score was composed by Raymond Wong and performed by the Hong Kong Chinese Orchestra. The score imitates traditional Chinese music in 1940s swordplay films. Along with Wong's compositions and various traditional Chinese songs, classical compositions are featured in the score, including excerpts from Zigeunerweisen by Pablo de Sarasate and "Sabre Dance" by Aram Khachaturian.

One of Wong's works, "Nothing Ventured, Nothing Gained" provides a stark contrast between the villainous Axe Gang and the peaceful neighbourhood of Pig Sty Alley, depicted by a Chinese folk song, "Fisherman’s Song of the East China Sea".

A song is sung in the background by Huang Shengyi at the end of the film. The song, "Zhi Yao Wei Ni Huo Yi Tian" (只要為你活一天; Only Want to Live One Day for You) was written by Liu Chia-Chang in the 1970s. It tells of a girl's memories of a loved one, and her desire to live for him again.

Kung Fu Hustle was nominated for the Best Original Film Score in the 24th Hong Kong Film Awards.

The Japanese version uses "Shiwase Nara Te wo Tatakou" by Nobodyknows as the theme song.

Asian and American versions of the soundtrack have been released. The Asian version of the soundtrack was released on 17 December 2004 by Sony Music and has 33 tracks. The American version of the soundtrack was released on 29 March 2005 by Varèse Sarabande and has 19 tracks.

== Track listings ==
Unless otherwise noted, the tracks are performed by the Hong Kong Chinese Orchestra.

=== Asian version ===
Music from and Inspired by the Motion Picture Kung Fu Hustle

Soundtrack album by various artists
- Released: December 17, 2004
- Genre: Classical
- Label: Sony Music Entertainment

1. "Like The Old Saying"
2. "Kung Fu 1"
3. "Nothing Ventured, Nothing Gained"
4. "Pay the Rent"
5. "Fisherman's Song of the East China Sea"
6. "No More Soccer"
7. "Ambush From All Sides"
8. "Come On"
9. "Allegro Molto Vivace" from Zigeunerweisen, Op. 20 (Pablo de Sarasate)
10. "I'm Not Scared"
11. "Moderato" from Zigeunerweisen, Op. 20
12. "Decree of the Sichuan General"
13. "Not Guilty Of Kung Fu"
14. "Midnight Assassin"
15. "Blade of Gu Qin"
16. "No Manners"
17. "Zhi Yao Wei Ni Huo Yi Tian"
18. "Night Club Band"
19. "Seize Any Opportunity"
20. "Sabre Dance" (Aram Khachaturian)
21. "Daring General"
22. "Casino Fight"
23. "Realization"
24. "Prejudiced to Four Eyes"
25. "Ying Xiong Men Zhan Sheng Le Da Du He"
26. "Dagger Society Suite"
27. "Fisherman's Song of the East China Sea"
28. "Buddhist Palm"
29. "Numb Nut"
30. "Zhi Yao Wei Ni Huo Yi Tian" (Huang Sheng Yi)
31. "Nothing Ventured, Nothing Gained" (Huang Sheng Yi)
32. "Kung Fu Fighting" (Carl Douglas)
33. "Hustle" (Van McCoy & The Soul City Symphony)

=== U.S. version ===
Music from the Motion Picture Kung Fu Hustle

Soundtrack album by various artists
- Released: April 29, 2005
- Genre: Classical
- Length: 37:47
- Label: Varèse Sarabande

1. "Kung Fu 1" (0:52)
2. "Nothing Ventured, Nothing Gained" (2:33)
3. "Fisherman's Song of the East China Sea" (3:03)
4. "Ambush from All Sides" (0:44)
5. "Allegro Molto Vivace" from Zigeunerweisen, Op. 20, performed by Akiko Suwanai and the Budapest Festival Orchestra (1:02)
6. "Moderato" from Zigeunerweisen, Op. 20, performed by Akiko Suwanai and the Budapest Festival Orchestra (1:24)
7. "Decree of the Sichuan General" (4:07)
8. "Midnight Assassin" (0:55)
9. "The Blade of Gu Qin" (1:22)
10. "Night Club Band" (1:02)
11. "Sabre Dance" (1:26)
12. "Daring General" (2:55)
13. "Casino Fight" (2:08)
14. "Realization" (1:30)
15. "Ying Xiong Men Zhan Sheng Le Da Du He"
16. "Dagger Society Suite" (2:42)
17. "Fisherman's Song of the East China Sea" (3:13)
18. "Buddhist Palm" (1:31)
19. "Nothing Ventured, Nothing Gained (Huang Sheng Yi) (3:27)

==== Missing US tracks ====
In the US version, 14 tracks that were featured in the original Asian release are missing and listed below.

- 01. "Like The Old Saying"
- 04. "Pay the Rent"
- 06 "No More Soccer"
- 08. "Come On"
- 10. "I'm Not Scared"
- 12. "Decree of the Sichuan General"
- 16. "No Manners"
- 17."Zhi Yao Wei Ni Huo Yi Tian"
- 19. "Seize Any Opportunity"
- 24. "Prejudiced to Four Eyes"
- 29. "Numb Nut"
- 30. "Zhi Yao Wei Ni Huo Yi Tian" (Huang Sheng Yi)
- 32. "Kung Fu Fighting" (Carl Douglas)
- 33. "Hustle" (Van McCoy & The Soul City Symphony)
