= Bakir Farkhutdinov =

Soviet weightlifter

Personal information
- Born: 15 May 1925 Nizhnie Chershily, Tatarstan, Russia
- Died: 2008 (aged 82–83) Moscow, Russia

Sport
- Sport: Weightlifting
Medal record
Representing the Soviet Union
World Weightlifting Championships
Gold medal – first place	1954 Vienna	Bantamweight
European Weightlifting Championships
Gold medal – first place	1954 Vienna	Bantamweight

Bakir Farrakhovich Farkhutdinov (Russian: Бакир Фаррахович Фархутдинов; 15 May 1925 – 2008) was a Russian bantamweight weightlifter who was active in the 1950s–60s. In 1954 he won the Soviet, European and world titles.

Farkhutdinov took up weightlifting aged 24, while serving in the Soviet Army, and retired at 41. After that for about 30 years he worked as a masseur with the Moscow football clubs Spartak and Dynamo. He had a son and a daughter.
