= Rinat Farkhoutdinov =

Russian-born ice dancer (born 1975)

Personal information
- Born: December 13, 1975 (age 50) Perm, Russian SFSR, Soviet Union
- Height: 1.82 m (5 ft 11 1/2 in)

Figure skating career
- Country: Russia; Japan
- Skating club: The Skating Center, L.L.C.
- Retired: 2002

Rinat Farkhoutdinov (born December 13, 1975) is a Russian-born ice dancer who competed internationally for Japan. With partner Nakako Tsuzuki, he is a three-time Japanese national champion and competed three times at the Four Continents and World Championships. They were unable to compete during the latter half of the 2001/2002 Olympic season due to an injury to Tsuzuki. Their partnership ended following that season. Farkhoutdinov moved to Euless, Texas, where he began working as a coach and choreographer. He has coached Julia Golovina / Oleg Voiko, among others.
