= Philippines at the 1990 Asian Winter Games =

- IOC code: PHI
- NOC: Philippine Olympic Committee

in Sapporo
- Competitors: 1 in 1 sport
- Medals: Gold 0 Silver 0 Bronze 0 Total 0

Asian Winter Games appearances
- 1990; 1996–2003; 2007; 2011; 2017; 2025; 2029

The Philippines competed in the 1990 Asian Winter Games which were held in Sapporo, Japan from March 9, 1990 to March 14, 1990.

== Alpine skiing ==
The Philippines had one male athlete in alpine skiing.

Athlete	Event	Run 1		Run 2		Total	
Athlete	Event	Time	Rank	Time	Rank	Time	Rank
Michael Teruel	Men's giant slalom	No information available					15
Michael Teruel	Men's slalom	No information available					11
