= Figure skating at the 2003 Asian Winter Games – Pairs =

Pairs at the 2003 Asian Winter Games
- Venue: Aomori Prefectural Skating Rink
- Dates: 2–4 February 2003
- Competitors: 8 from 3 nations

Medalists
gold medal	Zhao Hongbo; Shen Xue	China
silver medal	Tong Jian; Pang Qing	China
bronze medal	Artem Knyazev; Marina Aganina	Uzbekistan

The mixed pairs figure skating at the 2003 Asian Winter Games was held on 2 and 4 February 2003 at Aomori Prefectural Skating Rink, Japan.

== Schedule ==
All times are Japan Standard Time (UTC+09:00)

Date	Time	Event
Sunday, 2 February 2003	17:00	Short program
Tuesday, 4 February 2003	16:45	Free skating

== Results ==
Rank	Team	SP	FS	Total
1st place, gold medalist(s)	China (CHN); Zhao Hongbo; Shen Xue	1	1	1.5
2nd place, silver medalist(s)	China (CHN); Tong Jian; Pang Qing	2	2	3.0
3rd place, bronze medalist(s)	Uzbekistan (UZB); Artem Knyazev; Marina Aganina	3	3	4.5
4	Japan (JPN); Takeo Ogasawara; Makiko Ogasawara	4	4	6.0
