= Li Jiaqi (figure skater) =

Chinese pairs figure skater (born 1990)

Personal information
- Born: May 30, 1990 (age 36)
- Height: 153 cm (5 ft 0 in)

Figure skating career
- Country: China
- Partner: Xu Jiankun
- Coach: Yao Bin
Medal record
Representing China
Pairs' Figure skating
Asian Winter Games
Bronze medal – third place	2003 Aomori	Pairs

Li Jiaqi (Chinese: 李佳祺; pinyin: Lǐ Jiaqí; born May 30, 1990, in Changchun, Jilin) is a Chinese pairs figure skater. She competes with Xu Jiankun. The two are the 2006 Chinese national bronze medalists. They placed seventh at the 2006 Four Continents Championships.

== Competitive highlights ==
(with Xu)

Event	2004-05	2005-06	2006-07	2007-08	2008-09
World Junior Championships			10th		
Four Continents Championships		7th		6th	
Asian Winter Games			3rd		
Chinese Championships	5th	3rd	2nd	3rd	
Cup of China			7th	5th	
NHK Trophy				6th	
Trophée Eric Bompard			5th		
Winter Universiade					4th
