= Xu Jiankun =

Chinese pair skater (born 1986)

Personal information
- Born: October 8, 1986 (age 39)
- Height: 183 cm (6 ft 0 in)

Figure skating career
- Country: China
- Partner: Li Jiaqi
- Coach: Yao Bin
Medal record
Representing China
Pairs' Figure skating
Asian Winter Games
Bronze medal – third place	2003 Aomori	Pairs

Xu Jiankun (Chinese: 徐健焜; pinyin: Xú Jiànkūn; born October 8, 1986, in Changchun, Jilin) is a Chinese pair skater. His partner is Li Jiaqi and the two are the 2006 Chinese national bronze medalists. They placed seventh at the 2006 Four Continents Championships.

== Competitive highlights (with Li Jiaqi) ==
Event	2004-05	2005-06	2006-07	2007-08	2008-09
World Junior Championships			10th		
Four Continents Championships		7th		6th	
Chinese Championships	5th	3rd	2nd	3rd	
Asian Winter Games			3rd		
Cup of China			7th	5th	
NHK Trophy				6th	
Trophée Eric Bompard			5th		
Winter Universiade					4th
