= Figure skating at the 1999 Asian Winter Games – Pairs =

Pairs at the 1999 Asian Winter Games
- Venue: Yongpyong Dome
- Dates: 3–5 February 1999
- Competitors: 6 from 3 nations

Medalists
gold medal	Zhao Hongbo; Shen Xue	China
silver medal	Andrey Kryukov; Marina Khalturina	Kazakhstan
bronze medal	Evgeni Sviridov; Natalia Ponomareva	Uzbekistan

The mixed pairs figure skating at the 1999 Asian Winter Games was held on 3 and 5 February 1999 at Yongpyong Indoor Ice Rink, South Korea.

== Schedule ==
All times are Korea Standard Time (UTC+09:00)

Date	Time	Event
Wednesday, 3 February 1999	17:00	Short program
Friday, 5 February 1999	15:00	Free skating

== Results ==
Rank	Team	SP	FS	Total
1st place, gold medalist(s)	China (CHN); Zhao Hongbo; Shen Xue	1	1	1.5
2nd place, silver medalist(s)	Kazakhstan (KAZ); Andrey Kryukov; Marina Khalturina	2	2	3.0
3rd place, bronze medalist(s)	Uzbekistan (UZB); Evgeni Sviridov; Natalia Ponomareva	3	3	4.5
