= Philippines at the 2007 Asian Winter Games =

- IOC code: PHI
- NOC: Philippine Olympic Committee
- Website: www.olympic.ph (in English)

in Changchun
- Competitors: 5 in 1 sport
- Medals: Gold 0 Silver 0 Bronze 0 Total 0

Asian Winter Games appearances
- 1990; 1996–2003; 2007; 2011; 2017; 2025; 2029

The Philippines participated in the 2007 Asian Winter Games which was held in Changchun, China from January 28 to February 4, 2007.

== Participation details ==
=== Figure skating ===
This country was represented by 5 skaters followin the Philippine Skating Union's then recent full membership in the International Skating Union.

| Athlete | Event | Rank | Base Value | TES | PCS | TD | TSS |
|---|---|---|---|---|---|---|---|
| Jerico Lim | Men Single; Short Program | 10 | 15.20 | 12.16 | 16.99 | 0.00 | 29.15 |
| Michael Gregory Novales | Men Single; Short Program | 8 | 26.50 | 17.90 | 21.50 | 3.00 | 36.40 |
| Ramina Palaca | Ladies Single; Short Program | 15 | 9.10 | 6.10 | 10.28 | 1.00 | 15.38 |
| Anne Clarisse Roman | Ladies Single; Short Program | 14 | 11.40 | 7.90 | 10.46 | 1.00 | 17.36 |
| Gracielle Jean Tan | Ladies Single; Short Program | 11 | 19.20 | 14.40 | 12.88 | 1.00 | 26.28 |
