= Football at the 1940 East Asian Games =

Tournament details
- Host country: Japan
- Teams: 4
- Venue: 2 (in at least 2 host cities)

Final positions
- Champions: Japan
- Runners-up: Manchukuo
- Third place: Philippines
- Fourth place: Republic of China

Tournament statistics
- Matches played: 6
- Goals scored: 21 (3.5 per match)

Football was among the sports contested at the 1940 East Asian Games, a multi-sport event organised by the Japan Association of Athletics Federations (JAAA) as part of the 2600th Anniversary Celebrations of the Japanese Empire Since Kigen celebrations commemorating the establishment of the Japanese Empire by Emperor Jimmu.

== Results ==
Team	Pld	W	D	L	GF	GA	GD	Pts
Japan	3	3	0	0	14	0	14	6
Manchukuo	3	1	1	1	2	8	–6	3
Philippines	3	0	2	1	3	4	–1	2
Republic of China	3	0	1	2	2	9	–7	1

7 June 1940

Japan	7–0	Manchukuo
	Report

Meiji Jingu Gaien Stadium, Tokyo
8 June 1940

Republic of China	2–2	Philippines
	Report

Meiji Jingu Gaien Stadium, Tokyo
9 June 1940

Japan	6–0	Republic of China
	Report

Meiji Jingu Gaien Stadium, Tokyo
16 June 1940

Manchukuo	1–1	Philippines
	Report

16 June 1940

Japan	1–0	Philippines
	Report

Koshien South Ground, Nishinomiya
19 June 1940

Manchukuo	1–0	Republic of China
	Report
