= Asian Development Games =

The East Asian Games (Japanese: 東亜競技大会, romanized: Tōa Kyōgi Taikai), also known as the Asian Development Games (Japanese: 興亜競技大会, romanized: Kōa Kyōgi Taikai) were multi-sport events organized by the Japan Association of Athletics Federations (JAAA). The games were meant to be a replacement to the cancelled 1938 Far Eastern Championship Games and 1940 Summer Olympics originally to be hosted by Japan, and also served as a propaganda tool for Japan.

== Background ==
Japan had been a participant in the Far Eastern Championship Games since its inception and a member of its Far Eastern Athletic Association (FEAA) since 1917. While the aim of the organization was for every East Asian country to join, the attempts made by Japan for Manchukuo to join were rejected by China, who was also a member of the FEAA, leading to the organization's dissolution. Japan and the Philippines established the Oriental Sports Association (Japanese: 東洋体育協会, Tōyō Taiiku Kyōkai, OSA), which planned two tournaments, now known as the Oriental Games (Japanese: 東洋選手権, Tōyō Senshuken): one in Tokyo (1938) and Manila (1942). Both were cancelled as a result of the Second Sino–Japanese War.

The Philippines and Manchukuo were drawn back by these series of actions by Japan. Manchukuo formally joined the OSA and the Manchukuo Athletic Association (Japanese: 大満州国体育連盟) was created. The Philippines felt resentment for establishing the Oriental Association with the aim of "peace in the East". During negotiations with the government, which had promised independence by 1944, it was thought that getting involved in the Oriental Games, which was problematic from an international perspective, would be disadvantageous in future negotiations. On the other hand, Japan was aiming to bid for the 1940 Summer Olympics, and the existence of the OSA would have a disadvantageous effect on the bid for the Olympics. In addition, although there was a movement to allow China into the OSA, no specific offer was made.

Even after the Tokyo Olympics were officially decided in July 1936, there was no progress toward holding the Olympic Games, such as the difference in interest among sports groups toward the Oriental Games in Japan, China's refusal to join the Oriental Association, and the Philippines' declaration of non-participation in the first Games. On top of this, Manchuria requested participation in the Tokyo Olympics, but was rejected by the Japanese side as it would develop into a political problem.

When the Second Sino-Japanese War broke out on July 7, 1937, Ichirō Kōno, a member of the Imperial Diet, immediately requested that the Olympics be forfeited. Also cancelled were the 1938 Tokyo games, which led to the planning of a new competition. This would culminate in the 1939 tournament between Japan, Manchukuo and China (Nanjing).

At that time, Manchukuo and China had a positive view that sports could be effectively used as a diplomatic tool, thus showing enthusiasm for the idea, but since China could not organize a team that could participate in all competitions, it was decided that it would be held as an invitational tournament. The event was to be hosted in Xinjing, with various stadiums being built as part of a National Sports Complex as a result.

== Japan–Manchuria–China Friendship Games ==
Japan–Manchuria–China Friendship Games
- Host city: Xinjing
- Nations: 3
- Events: 4
- Opening: 31 August 1939
- Closing: 3 September 1939
- Main venue: National Sports Complex

The Japan–Manchuria–China Friendship Games (Japanese: 日満華交歓競技大会, Nichiman Hana Kōkan Kyōgi Taikai) began with an opening ceremony on August 31, although weather conditions meant that the competition began the next day. Despite this gesture, the event was marked by terrible weather conditions, as rain poured throughout the tournament.

There were four sports: track and field, basketball, volleyball, and soccer. Swimming, baseball, martial arts, gymnastics, and other sports which were popular in Japan, were not implemented. The Manchurian team was particularly excited over baseball, but due to the Tokyo Big6 Baseball League's refusal to participate, the sport did not take place. China did not participate in volleyball, leaving Japan and Manchukuo to play against each other, with the remaining three sports being the only ones to feature all three teams.

The focus of this tournament was how well Manchukuo and China could compete against Japan. Soccer was the highlight of the tournament due to North China being a place where soccer flourished. Not only had China won nine consecutive victories in the Far Eastern Championship Games, but in Manchukuo soccer was the national sport, and Japan had strengthened its team by defeating the Swedish team at the Berlin Olympics. As a result, a tough fight was expected.

Starting date	Venue	Name
August 19	Keijō	Manchu–Korean Competition
August 26	Dairen	Welcome Games for the Japanese Athletes
August 31	Japan–Manchuria–China Friendship Games	
September 5	Mukden	Japan–Manchuria–China Mukden Games
September 9	Keijō	Korean–Chinese Competitive General Tournament

In the end, Japan won both games (being the only scoring team), and there was a brawl in the match between Japan and China. Japan won all the basketball and volleyball games. In track and field, despite the unexpected performance of China, Japan finished first and Manchukuo finished second.

Manchuria was based on the founding principle of "Five Races Under One Union" (similar to the Chinese principle), but in this tournament, the Manchurian, Korean, and Caucasian groups were not harmonious as a team, and the Manchurian audience found itself rooting for the Chinese team instead of the Manchurian one. Despite the political use of this tournament, such as the fact that the team was made up of only Chinese players, the results revealed a different reality among the Mainland Chinese.

In addition, before and after this tournament, tournaments in which Korea participated in addition to Manchuria and China were held, and from the athletes' side, this tournament was just a part of a series of competitions.

=== Prelude to the 1940 Games ===
In November 1939, the OSA was dissolved and the "Greater East Asia Athletic Association" was newly established with the membership of Japan, Manchukuo, the Philippines, China, Thailand, and Burma. Then, in June 1940, it was decided that the "East Asian Games" would be held in Japan as a substitute for the cancelled Tokyo Olympics and as part of the celebrations commemorating the 2,600th anniversary of the ascension of Emperor Jimmu and thus, the establishment of the Japanese Empire. Japan is promoted as "a new position in the East Asia sports system." Some sources suggest that this tournament is an advanced version of the 1939 games, being the de facto Second East Asian Games as a result. It was the first time in ten years since the 9th Far Eastern Championship Games that an international competition was held in Japan.

Of all the countries that participated in this tournament, which was held twice, Manchukuo, China, and Mengjiang had strong ties with Japan. The Philippines and Hawaii were territories of the United States, but nevertheless Japanese immigrants in Hawaii participated in the tournament.

== 1940 East Asian Games ==
East Asian Games of the Year 2600
- Host city: Tokyo, Japan; Kansai Region, Japan
- Nations: 6
- Athletes: 700+
- Opening: 5 June 1940 (Tokyo); 13 June 1940 (Kansai)
- Closing: 9 June 1940 (Tokyo); 16 June 1940 (Kansai)
- Opened by: Yasuhito, Prince Chichibu
- Main venue: Meiji Jingu Gaien Stadium

The 1940 East Asian Games (Japanese: 1940東亜競技大会), officially the East Asian Games of the Year 2600 (Japanese: 紀元二千六百年奉祝東亜競技大会), were held from 5 to 16 June 1940. 6 different countries participated in the event, with over 700 athletes attending. Besides the participating countries, foreigners residing in Japan (excluding Manchus, Koreans and Chinese) were allowed to participate as "foreign residents".

The games were divided between two tournaments: one in Tokyo held from June 5 to 9, 1940, and a second one in Kansai Region, held from June 13 to 16. Besides the regular sports events, demonstrations of archery and Mongolian Sumo were also held. The games were officially declared open by Yasuhito, a younger brother of Hirohito, on June 9, 1940, during the opening ceremony in Meiji Jingu Gaien Stadium in Tokyo.

Similar to the games in Berlin, the event was reportedly used by Japan to strengthen inter-Asian relations and to promote its war effort, as seen in articles published at the time, such as one in Issue 121 of the Shashin Shūhō, which referred to the Second Sino–Japanese War as a "Holy War" (Japanese: 聖戦, seisen).

An emblem (and a flag which featured it) was designed for the event, which featured a figure with the numbers "2600" overlaid on top of it. The numbers represented the celebration of Emperor Jimmu, but also alluded to the cancelled Olympic event, as the digits' design was reminiscent of that of the Olympic rings.

Japanese athletes won 10 out of 18 individual track and field events, and Japan took first place in most of the team events. Baseball was described as the most popular sport of the event by Asahi Sports and Sunday Mainichi. Also highlighted was the rivalry between the Japanese and Philippine teams, who ended first and second place in the tournament, respectively.

The Japan national team featured one Korean player, Kim Won-Kwon (Japanese: 金源権), and the Manchuria national team featured players of Japanese and Russian descent.

=== Venues ===
==== Tokyo ====
- Meiji Shrine Outer Garden
  - Meiji Jingu Gaien Stadium - Opening and closing ceremonies, performance competitions, athletics, cycling (track), football, rugby, hockey
  - Meiji Jingu Gaien Sumo Hall - basketball, volleyball,
  - Meiji Jingu Stadium - Baseball
  - Nippon Seinenkan - Wrestling
- Denen Coliseum - Tennis
- Ōmiya Velodrome - Bicycle (Track)
- Kyoritsu Auditorium - table tennis
- Hibiya Park - Soft Tennis
- Yokohama - Kominato - Yacht
- Katase - Ōiso - Odawara - Bicycle (Road)

==== Kansai ====
- Kashihara
  - Kashihara Jingu Gaien Outdoor Public Hall - Opening ceremony, closing ceremony, Soft Tennis, Basketball
  - Kashihara Stadium - Athletics, handball, volleyball
  - Construction Hall - Table Tennis
- Koshien
  - Koshien - Bicycle
  - Koshien International Club - Tennis
  - Koshien Stadium - Baseball
  - Minami Koshien - Football
  - Kōshienhama - Yacht
- Hanazono Rugby Stadium
- Sanadayama Park

=== Participants ===
- Japan
- China (Nanking)
- Hawaii
- Manchukuo
- Mengjiang
- Philippines
- ~~Thailand~~ (withdrew)

=== Schedule ===
The following table shows the original schedule, as the baseball and tennis competitions of the Kansai tournament were cancelled due to rain.

●	Opening ceremony	Tournament day	●	Closing ceremony

	Tokyo					Kansai			
Date	5 Wed	6 Thu	7 Fri	8 Sat	9 Sun	13 Thu	14 Fri	15 Sat	16 Sun
Cycling									
Basketball									
Athletics									
Volleyball									
Baseball									
Tennis									
Table tennis									
Football									
Sailing									
Wrestling									
Boxing									
Rugby union									
Soft tennis									
Field hockey									
Handball									
Equestrian									
Swimming									
Opening and closing ceremonies	●				●	●			●

=== Sports ===
- Athletics
- Baseball
- Basketball
- Boxing
- Cycling
- Equestrian
- Field hockey
- Football
- Handball
- Rugby union
- Sailing
- Soft tennis
- Swimming
- Table tennis
- Tennis
- Volleyball
- Wrestling

== 1942 East Asian Games ==
East Asian Games of the 10th Anniversary of Manchukuo Celebration
- Host city: Xinjing
- Nations: 4
- Athletes: ≅680 (Summer); 70+ (Winter)
- Opening: 8 August 1942 (Summer); 7/8 February 1943 (Winter)
- Closing: 11 August 1942 (Summer); 20/21 February 1943 (Winter)
- Opened by: Pu Yi
- Main venue: National Sports Complex

The 1942 East Asian Games (Japanese: 1942東亜競技大会), officially the East Asian Games of the 10th Anniversary of Manchukuo Celebration (Japanese: 満州国建国十周年慶祝東亜競技大会), were held in Xinjing from August 8–11, 1942 to commemorate the 10th anniversary of the establishment of Manchukuo. Four countries and around 680 athletes participated in the event. A football match between Japan and Korea was played in Keijō on August 16, although this match's relation to the tournament is disputed.

A winter tournament was also held on February 7–8, 1943, in which Japan and Manchukuo participated with over 70 athletes. A ski competition was held on February 20 and 21 of the same year and was combined with the Kwantung Army's Winter Training Tournament.

Compared to past competitions, the Manchurian team (although actually Japanese) was more prominent in this competition. The opening ceremony was held in the presence of Emperor Kangde. This tournament was held after the outbreak of the Pacific War.

=== Venues ===
==== Summer ====
- National Sports Complex (Xinjing)

==== Winter ====
- Shinkyo Kodama Park ice slide - ice sports
- Tonghua Nanshan Ski Resort - Ski Competition

=== Participants ===
- Japan
- China (Nanking)
- Manchukuo
- Mengjiang

=== Sports ===
Summer
- Archery
- Athletics
- Baseball
- Basketball
- Bayonet
- Cycling
- Equestrian
- Football
- Gymnastics
- Judo
- Kendo
- Rugby union
- Soft tennis
- Sumo
- Swimming
- Table tennis
- Tennis
- Volleyball
- Water polo

Winter
- Ice Competition
  - Ice hockey
  - Figure skating
  - Speed skating
- Ski Competition
  - Alpine skiing
  - Nordic skiing
  - Ski jumping
- Army
  - Long-distance running
  - Messenger race
  - Scout race
  - Troop maneuver race

== See also ==
- Far Eastern Championship Games
- Greater East Asia Co-Prosperity Sphere
- 1934 FIFA World Cup
- 1936 Summer Olympics
- Games of the New Emerging Forces

== Bibliography ==
- Irie, Katsumi (1994). 近代日本における植民地体育政策の研究(第3報) —帝政への移行と日満ファシズム体育体制の強化— [A Study of Colonial Sports Policy in Modern Japan (Part 3): The Transition to the Empire and Strengthening of the Japanese-Manchurian Fascist Sports System] (PDF). Vol. 36. Tottori University Faculty of Education.
- Takashima, Wataru (2010). 戦時下の平和の祭典 - 幻の東京オリンピックと極東スポーツ界 [Festival of Peace in Wartime-The Illusory Tokyo Olympics and the Far East Sports World] (PDF) (in Japanese). Kyoto University.
- Sasazima, Kousuke (1965). 旧満州国の体育とスポーツ [Physical Education and Sports in Old Manchukuo] (in Japanese). Vol. 5. Keio Institute of Physical Education.
- 運動年鑑. 昭和16年度 [Athletic Yearbook. Shōwa 16] (in Japanese). Asahi Shimbun Physical Fitness Department. 1941.
- 運動年鑑. 昭和18年度 [Athletic Yearbook. Shōwa 18] (in Japanese). Asahi Shimbun Physical Fitness Department. 1943.
