= Japan national football team records and statistics =

The following is a list of the Japan national football team's competitive records and statistics.

== Player records ==
As of 5 December 2022
Players in bold are still active with Japan.

=== Most capped players ===
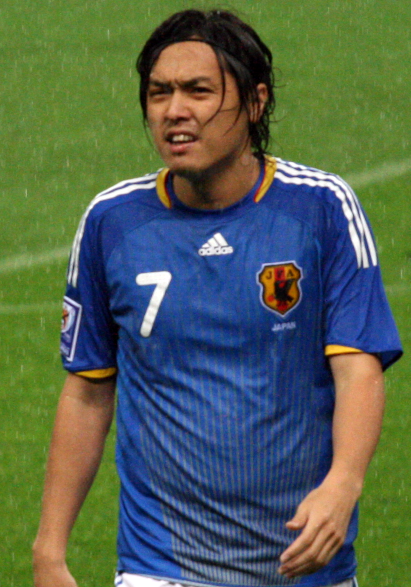
Yasuhito Endō is Japan's most capped player with 152 appearances

Rank	Player	Caps	Goals	Position	Career
1	Yasuhito Endō	152	15	MF	2002–2015
2	**Yuto Nagatomo**	142	4	DF	2008–present
3	Maya Yoshida	125	12	DF	2010–2022
4	Masami Ihara	122	5	DF	1988–1999
5	Shinji Okazaki	119	50	FW	2008–2019
6	Yoshikatsu Kawaguchi	116	0	GK	1997–2010
7	Makoto Hasebe	114	2	MF	2006–2018
8	Yuji Nakazawa	110	17	DF	1999–2010
9	Shunsuke Nakamura	98	24	MF	2000–2010
9	Keisuke Honda	98	37	MF	2008–2018

=== Top goalscorers ===
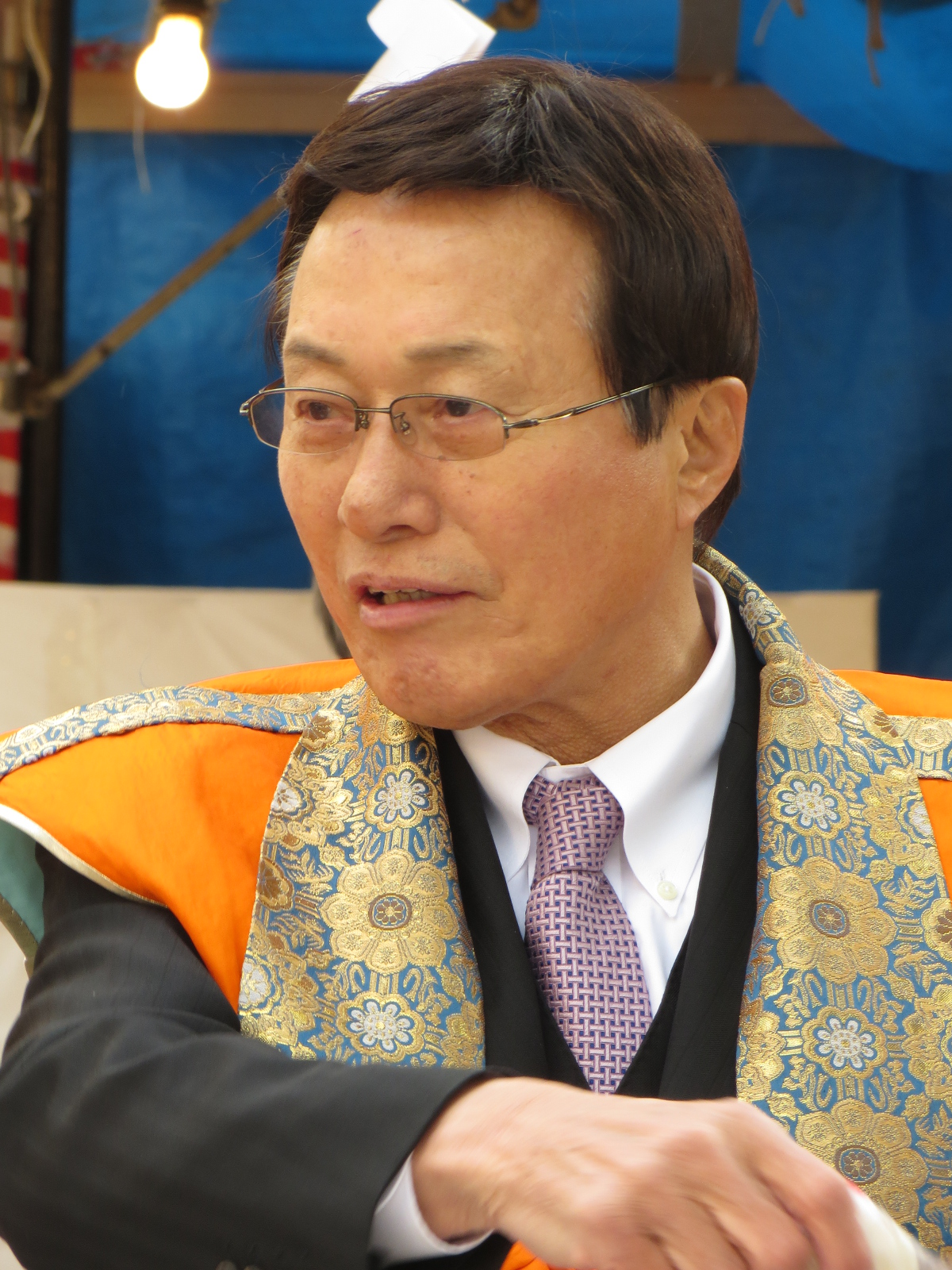
Kunishige Kamamoto is Japan's top goal scorer with 75 goals

Rank	Player	Goals	Caps	Ratio	Career
1	Kunishige Kamamoto	75	76	0.99	1964–1977
2	Kazuyoshi Miura	55	89	0.62	1990–2000
3	Shinji Okazaki	50	119	0.42	2008–2019
4	Hiromi Hara	37	75	0.49	1978–1988
4	Keisuke Honda	37	98	0.38	2008–2018
6	Shinji Kagawa	31	97	0.32	2008–2019
7	Takuya Takagi	27	44	0.61	1992–1997
8	Kazushi Kimura	26	54	0.48	1979–1986
9	Yuya Osako	25	57	0.44	2013–2022
10	Shunsuke Nakamura	24	98	0.24	2000–2010

=== Other records ===
Updated 29 March 2022

- **Youngest player**

Daisuke Ichikawa, 17 years and 322 days old, 1 April 1998 against South Korea

- **Youngest goalscorer**

Shinji Kagawa, 19 years and 206 days old, 9 October 2008 against United Arab Emirates

- **Youngest captain**

Gen Shoji, 24 years and 363 days old, 9 December 2017 EAFF E-1 Championship

- **Oldest player**

Eiji Kawashima, 39 years and 9 days old, 29 March 2022 against Vietnam

- **Oldest goalscorer**

Masashi Nakayama, 33 years and 326 days old, 15 August 2001 against Australia

- **Oldest captain**

Shigeo Yaegashi, 35 years and 203 days old, 13 October 1968 Summer Olympics

- **Most hat-trick**

8, Kunishige Kamamoto

- **Most goal in one match**

6, Kunishige Kamamoto, 27 September 1967 against Philippines
6, Kazuyoshi Miura, 22 June 1997 against Macau

- **Most goal in calendar year**

18, Kazuyoshi Miura, 1997

== Manager records ==
=== Most appearances ===
Rank	Manager	Apps	Wins	Tenure
1	(Brazil) Zico	71	37	2002–2006
2	(Italy) Alberto Zaccheroni	55	30	2010–2014
3	(France) Philippe Troussier	50	23	1998–2002
3	(Japan) Takeshi Okada	50	26	2007–2010
5	(Japan) Hajime Moriyasu	50	36	2018–
6	(Japan) Shu Kamo	46	23	1994–1997
7	(Japan) Takaji Mori	43	23	1981–1985
8	(Japan) Ken Naganuma (2nd)	42	16	1972–1976
9	(Bosnia and Herzegovina) Vahid Halilhodžić	38	21	2015–2018
10	(Japan) Ken Naganuma (1st)	31	18	1963–1969

=== Manager achievements ===
Manager	Tournament
Zico	AFC Asian Cup Winners (2004); EAFF Championship Runners-up (2003, 2005)
Philippe Troussier	FIFA Confederations Cup Runners-up (2001); AFC Asian Cup Winners (2000)
Alberto Zaccheroni	AFC Asian Cup Winners (2011); EAFF Championship Winners (2013)
Ken Naganuma	Summer Olympics Third place (1968); Asian Games Third place (1966)
Hajime Moriyasu	AFC Asian Cup Runners-up (2019); EAFF Championship Runners-up (2019), Winners (2022)
Hans Ooft	AFC Asian Cup Winners (1992)
Hirokazu Ninomiya	Asian Games Third place (1951)
Takeshi Okada	EAFF Championship Runners-up (2008), Third place (2010)
Vahid Halilhodžić	EAFF Championship Runners-up (2017)

== Team records ==
Updated 19 January 2024

Biggest victory
15–0 vs Philippines, 27 September 1967
Heaviest defeat
15–2 vs Philippines, 10 May 1917
Most consecutive victories
11, 15 June 2023 vs. El Salvador – 14 January 2024 vs. Vietnam
Most consecutive matches without defeat
20, 24 June 2010 vs. Denmark – 11 November 2011 vs. Tajikistan
Most consecutive defeats
6, 10 June 1956 vs. South Korea – 28 December 1958 vs. Malaya
Most consecutive matches without victory
11, 13 August 1976 vs. Burma – 15 June 1976 vs. South Korea
Most consecutive draws
4, 13 August 1976 vs. Burma – 20 August 1976 vs. Malaysia
Most consecutive matches scoring
17, 1 December 2022 vs. Spain – 24 January 2024 vs. Indonesia
Most consecutive matches without scoring
6, 18 June 1989 vs. Hong Kong – 31 July 1990 vs. North Korea
Most consecutive matches conceding a goal
28, 6 November 1960 vs. South Korea – 11 December 1966 vs. Iran
Most consecutive matches without conceding a goal
7, 19 November 2003 vs. Cameroon – 18 February 2004 vs. Oman

== Competitive record ==
Champions Runners-up Third place Fourth place

*Denotes draws includes knockout matches decided via penalty shoot-out. Red border indicates that the tournament was hosted on home soil. Gold, silver, bronze backgrounds indicate 1st, 2nd and 3rd finishes respectively. Bold text indicates best finish in tournament.

=== FIFA World Cup ===
FIFA World Cup record									Qualification record					
Year	Result	Position	Pld	W	D*	L	GF	GA	Pld	W	D	L	GF	GA
(Uruguay) 1930	Did not enter								No qualification					
(Italy) 1934	Did not enter								Did not enter					
(France) 1938	Withdrew								Withdrew					
(Brazil) 1950	Suspended from FIFA								Suspended from FIFA					
(Switzerland) 1954	Did not qualify								2	0	1	1	3	7
(Sweden) 1958	Did not enter								Did not enter					
(Chile) 1962	Did not qualify								2	0	0	2	1	4
(England) 1966	Did not enter								Did not enter					
(Mexico) 1970	Did not qualify								4	0	2	2	4	8
(West Germany) 1974	Did not qualify								4	1	0	3	5	4
(Argentina) 1978	Did not qualify								4	0	1	3	0	5
(Spain) 1982	Did not qualify								4	2	0	2	4	2
(Mexico) 1986	Did not qualify								8	5	1	2	15	5
(Italy) 1990	Did not qualify								6	2	3	1	7	3
(United States) 1994	Did not qualify								13	9	3	1	35	6
(France) 1998	Group stage	31st	3	0	0	3	1	4	15	9	5	1	51	12
(South Korea) (Japan) 2002	Round of 16	9th	4	2	1	1	5	3	Qualified as hosts					
(Germany) 2006	Group stage	28th	3	0	1	2	2	7	12	11	0	1	25	5
(South Africa) 2010	Round of 16	9th	4	2	1	1	4	2	14	8	4	2	23	9
(Brazil) 2014	Group stage	29th	3	0	1	2	2	6	14	8	3	3	30	8
(Russia) 2018	Round of 16	15th	4	1	1	2	6	7	18	13	3	2	44	7
(Qatar) 2022	Round of 16	9th	4	2	1	1	5	4	18	15	1	2	58	6
(Canada) (Mexico) (United States) 2026	Round of 32	21st	4	1	2	1	8	5	14	12	2	0	48	2
**Total**	**Round of 16**	**8/23**	**29**	**8**	**8**	**13**	**33**	**38**	**152**	**95**	**29**	**28**	**353**	**93**

=== AFC Asian Cup ===
AFC Asian Cup record									Qualification record					
Year	Result	Position	Pld	W	D	L	GF	GA	Pld	W	D	L	GF	GA
(Hong Kong) 1956	Withdrew								Withdrew					
(South Korea) 1960	Withdrew								Withdrew					
(Israel) 1964	Withdrew								Withdrew					
(Iran) 1968	Did not qualify								4	3	1	0	8	4
(Thailand) 1972	Withdrew								Withdrew					
(Iran) 1976	Did not qualify								5	2	1	2	4	4
(Kuwait) 1980	Withdrew								Withdrew					
(Singapore) 1984	Withdrew								Withdrew					
(Qatar) 1988	Group stage	10th	4	0	1	3	0	6	4	2	1	1	6	3
(Japan) 1992	**Champions**	**1st**	**5**	**3**	**2**	**0**	**6**	**3**	Qualified as hosts					
(United Arab Emirates) 1996	Quarter-finals	5th	4	3	0	1	7	3	Qualified as champions					
(Lebanon) 2000	**Champions**	**1st**	**6**	**5**	**1**	**0**	**21**	**6**	3	3	0	0	15	0
(China) 2004	**Champions**	**1st**	**6**	**4**	**2**	**0**	**13**	**6**	Qualified as champions					
(Indonesia) (Malaysia) (Thailand) (Vietnam) 2007	**Fourth place**	**4th**	**6**	**2**	**3**	**1**	**11**	**7**	6	5	0	1	15	2
(Qatar) 2011	**Champions**	**1st**	**6**	**4**	**2**	**0**	**14**	**6**	6	5	0	1	17	4
(Australia) 2015	Quarter-finals	5th	4	3	1	0	8	1	Qualified as champions					
(United Arab Emirates) 2019	**Runners-up**	**2nd**	**7**	**6**	**0**	**1**	**12**	**6**	8	7	1	0	27	0
(Qatar) 2023	Quarter-finals	7th	5	3	0	2	12	8	8	8	0	0	46	2
(Saudi Arabia) 2027	Qualified								6	6	0	0	24	0
Total	4 Titles	11/19	53	33	12	8	104	52	50	41	4	5	162	19

=== Copa América ===
Japan is the first team from outside the Americas to participate in the Copa América, having been invited to the 1999 Copa América. Japan was also invited to the 2011 tournament and initially accepted the invitation. However, following the 2011 Tōhoku earthquake and tsunami, the JFA later withdrew on 16 May 2011, citing the difficulty of releasing some Japanese players from European teams to play as replacements. On the next day, CONMEBOL invited Costa Rica to replace Japan in the competition.

On 16 August 2013, CONMEBOL president Eugenio Figueredo announced that Japan was invited to the 2015 Copa América. However, Japan later declined the invitation due to scheduling problems.

On 14 May 2018, CONMEBOL announced that Japan, alongside Qatar, would be the two invited teams for the 2019 Copa América.

Copa América record
Year	Result	Position	Pld	W	D	L	GF	GA
(Paraguay) 1999	Group stage	10th	3	0	1	2	3	8
(Argentina) 2011	Withdrew							
(Chile) 2015	Withdrew							
(Brazil) 2019	Group stage	9th	3	0	2	1	3	7
Total	Group stage	2/47	6	0	3	3	6	15

CONMEBOL Copa América history
Year	Round	Date	Opponent	Result	Stadium
(Paraguay) 1999	Group stage	29 June	Peru	**L** 2–3	Estadio Defensores del Chaco, Asunción
(Paraguay) 1999	Group stage	2 July	Paraguay	**L** 0–4	Estadio Defensores del Chaco, Asunción
(Paraguay) 1999	Group stage	5 July	Bolivia	**D** 1–1	Monumental Rio Parapiti, Pedro Juan Caballero
(Brazil) 2019	Group stage	17 June	Chile	**L** 0–4	Estádio do Morumbi, São Paulo
(Brazil) 2019	Group stage	20 June	Uruguay	**D** 2–2	Arena do Grêmio, Porto Alegre
(Brazil) 2019	Group stage	24 June	Ecuador	**D** 1–1	Estádio Mineirão, Belo Horizonte

=== FIFA Confederations Cup ===
FIFA Confederations Cup record
Year	Result	Position	Pld	W	D	L	GF	GA	Squad
(Saudi Arabia) 1992	Did not qualify								
(Saudi Arabia) 1995	Group stage	6th	2	0	0	2	1	8	Squad
(Saudi Arabia) 1997	Did not qualify								
(Mexico) 1999	Did not qualify								
(South Korea) (Japan) 2001	**Runners-up**	**2nd**	**5**	**3**	**1**	**1**	**6**	**1**	Squad
(France) 2003	Group stage	6th	3	1	0	2	4	3	Squad
(Germany) 2005	Group stage	5th	3	1	1	1	4	4	Squad
(South Africa) 2009	Did not qualify								
(Brazil) 2013	Group stage	7th	3	0	0	3	4	9	Squad
(Russia) 2017	Did not qualify								
Total	Runners-up	5/10	16	5	2	9	19	25	–

=== Olympic Games ===
Since 1992, the Olympic team has been drawn from a squad with a maximum of three players over 23 years age, and the achievements of this team are not generally regarded as part of the national team's records, nor are the statistics credited to the players' international records.

Summer Olympics record									Qualification record					
Year	Result	Position	Pld	W	D	L	GF	GA	Pld	W	D	L	GF	GA
(United Kingdom) 1908	Did not enter								0	0	0	0	0	0
(Sweden) 1912	Did not enter								0	0	0	0	0	0
(Belgium) 1920	Did not enter								0	0	0	0	0	0
(France) 1924	Did not enter								0	0	0	0	0	0
(Netherlands) 1928	Did not enter								0	0	0	0	0	0
(Germany) 1936	Quarter-finals	8th	2	1	0	1	3	10	0	0	0	0	0	0
(United Kingdom) 1948	Did not enter								0	0	0	0	0	0
(Finland) 1952	Did not enter								0	0	0	0	0	0
(Australia) 1956	First round	10th	1	0	0	1	0	2	0	0	0	0	0	0
(Italy) 1960	Did not qualify								0	0	0	0	0	0
(Japan) 1964	Quarter-finals	8th	3	1	0	2	5	9	Qualified as hosts					
(Mexico) 1968	**Bronze medalists**	**3rd**	**6**	**3**	**2**	**1**	**9**	**8**	0	0	0	0	0	0
(West Germany) 1972	Did not enter								0	0	0	0	0	0
(Canada) 1976	Did not qualify								0	0	0	0	0	0
(Soviet Union) 1980	Did not enter								0	0	0	0	0	0
(United States) 1984	Did not qualify								0	0	0	0	0	0
(South Korea) 1988	Did not qualify								0	0	0	0	0	0
1992–present	See Japan national under-23 team								0	0	0	0	0	0
Total	Bronze medalists	4/17	12	5	2	5	17	29	0	0	0	0	0	0

Summer Olympics history
Year	Round	Score	Result
1936	First round	Japan **3–2** Sweden	Win
1936	Quarter-finals	Japan **0–8** Italy	Loss
1956	First round	Japan **0–2** Australia	Loss
1964	Group stage	Japan **3–2** Argentina	Win
1964	Group stage	Japan **2–3** Ghana	Loss
1964	Quarter-finals	Japan **0–4** Czechoslovakia	Loss
1968	Group stage	Japan **3–1** Nigeria	Win
1968	Group stage	Japan **1–1** Brazil	Draw
1968	Group stage	Japan **0–0** Spain	Draw
1968	Quarter-finals	Japan **3–1** France	Win
1968	Semi-finals	Japan **0–5** Hungary	Loss
1968	Bronze medal match	Japan **2–0** Mexico	Win

=== Asian Games ===
Football at the Asian Games has been an under-23 tournament since 2002.

Asian Games record
Year	Result	Pld	W	D	L	GF	GA
(India) 1951	**Third place**	3	1	1	1	4	3
(Philippines) 1954	10th	2	0	0	2	5	8
(Japan) 1958	12th	2	0	0	2	0	3
(Indonesia) 1962	6th	3	1	0	2	3	4
(Thailand) 1966	**Third place**	7	6	0	1	18	5
(Thailand) 1970	**Fourth place**	7	5	0	2	8	5
(Iran) 1974	9th	3	1	1	1	5	4
(Thailand) 1978	9th	3	1	0	2	5	5
(India) 1982	5th	4	3	0	1	6	3
(South Korea) 1986	9th	4	2	0	2	9	4
(China) 1990	8th	3	1	0	2	3	3
(Japan) 1994	7th	4	1	2	1	9	5
(Thailand) 1998	9th	5	3	0	2	8	4
2002–present	See Japan national under-23 football team						
Total	13/13	50	25	4	21	83	56

== Head-to-head record ==
The list shown below shows the Japan national football team head-to-head record. As of 14 June 2026.

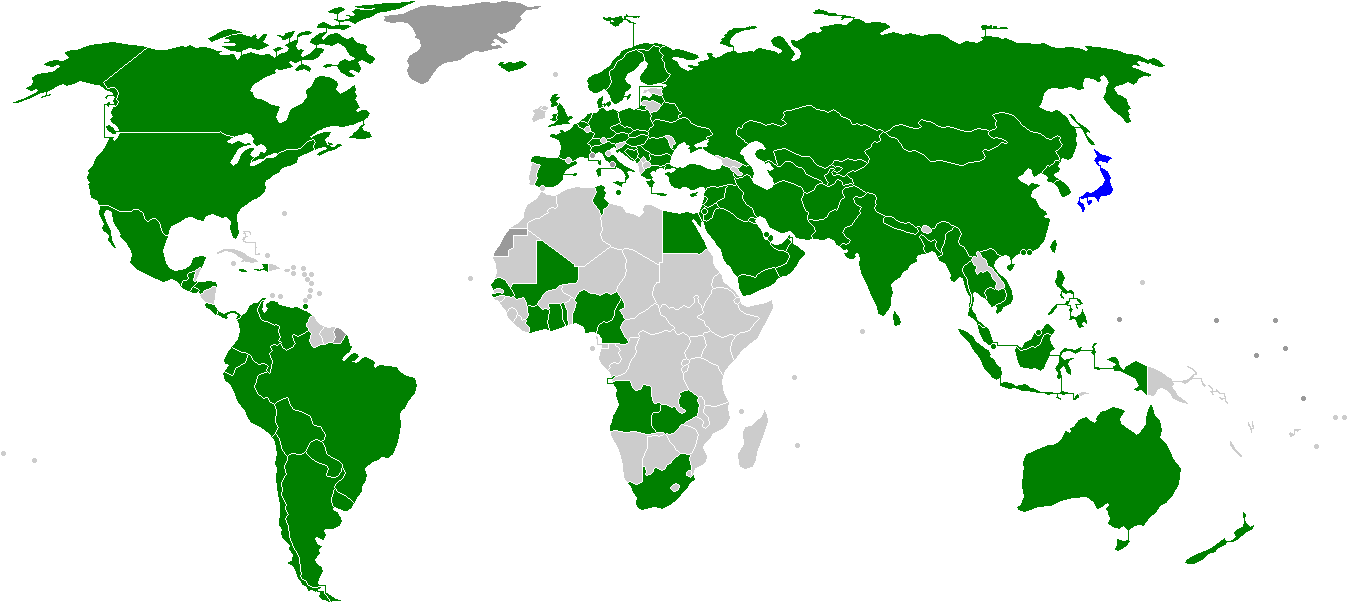
Japan national football team all-time opponents highlighted in green.

=== Summary ===
As of 5 October 2026

Confederation	Pld	W	D	L	GF	GA	GD
AFC	539	291	112	137	1,094	555	+539
CAF	40	24	7	9	69	39	+30
CONCACAF	37	21	6	10	76	38	+38
CONMEBOL	77	20	24	33	87	122	–35
OFC	9	6	0	3	16	10	+6
UEFA	123	41	26	56	157	200	–43
Total	824	403	174	247	1,487	965	+522

=== AFC ===
As of 15 July 2025

Opponent	First meeting	Last meeting	Pld	W	D	L	GF	GA	GD
Afghanistan	1951	2015	3	3	0	0	13	0	+13
Australia	1956	2025	26	9	11	7	36	33	+3
Bahrain	1978	2025	14	11	1	2	28	11	+17
Bangladesh	1975	1993	5	5	0	0	22	1	+21
Brunei	1980	2000	3	3	0	0	18	2	+16
Cambodia	1970	2015	4	4	0	0	10	1	+9
China	1917	2025	39	18	9	12	57	53	+4
Chinese Taipei	1963	1983	7	4	2	1	17	8	+9
Hong Kong	1958	2025	25	14	5	6	54	22	+34
India	1954	2006	12	9	0	3	36	11	+25
Indonesia	1934	2025	21	13	2	6	52	26	+26
Iran	1951	2019	18	6	6	6	21	19	+2
Iraq	1978	2024	14	7	3	4	20	12	+8
Jordan	1988	2024	7	3	3	1	18	6	+12
Kuwait	1978	1996	5	1	0	4	2	8	−6
Kyrgyzstan	2018	2019	2	2	0	0	6	0	+6
Lebanon	1967	1967	1	1	0	0	3	1	+2
Macau	1980	2000	4	4	0	0	26	0	+26
Malaysia	1958	2004	26	9	7	10	40	43	−3
Mongolia	2019	2021	2	2	0	0	20	0	+20
Myanmar	1955	2024	16	9	5	2	39	12	+27
Nepal	1986	1997	5	5	0	0	28	0	+28
North Korea	1975	2024	20	9	4	7	20	14	+6
Oman	1988	2021	13	9	3	1	20	5	+15
Pakistan	1962	1988	2	1	1	0	5	2	+3
Palestine	2015	2015	1	1	0	0	4	0	+4
Philippines	1915	1983	20	15	0	5	88	35	+53
Qatar	1983	2019	10	2	4	4	12	15	−3
Saudi Arabia	1990	2025	18	11	2	5	27	13	+14
Singapore	1959	2015	26	21	2	3	58	18	+40
South Korea	1954	2025	79	16	23	40	75	119	−44
South Vietnam	1961	1973	5	4	0	1	14	5	+9
South Yemen	1982	1982	1	1	0	0	3	1	+2
Sri Lanka	1972	1993	3	3	0	0	16	0	+16
Syria	1978	2024	13	11	2	0	37	9	+28
Tajikistan	2011	2021	4	4	0	0	19	1	+18
Thailand	1962	2024	23	17	4	2	57	16	+41
Turkmenistan	2019	2019	1	1	0	0	3	2	+1
United Arab Emirates	1981	2017	19	6	9	4	22	17	+5
Uzbekistan	1996	2019	11	7	3	1	30	10	+20
Vietnam	2007	2024	6	5	1	0	12	4	+8
Yemen	2006	2010	4	4	0	0	8	3	+5
Total	1917	2025	536	289	110	138	1,086	559	+527

=== CAF ===
As of 20 June 2026

Opponent	From	To	Pld	W	D	L	GF	GA	GD
Angola	2005	2005	1	1	0	0	1	0	+1
Cameroon	2001	2020	5	3	2	0	5	0	+5
Egypt	1998	2007	2	2	0	0	5	1	+4
Ghana	1964	2025	9	6	0	3	20	14	+6
Ivory Coast	1993	2020	5	3	0	2	4	4	0
Mali	2018	2018	1	0	1	0	1	1	0
Nigeria	1968	2003	4	2	1	1	8	6	+2
Senegal	1987	2018	4	0	2	2	4	7	−3
South Africa	2009	2009	1	0	1	0	0	0	0
Togo	2009	2009	1	1	0	0	5	0	+5
Tunisia	1996	2026	7	6	0	1	12	3	+9
Zambia	2014	2014	1	1	0	0	4	3	+1
Total	1964	2026	39	24	7	8	65	35	+30

=== CONCACAF ===
As of 9 September 2025

Opponent	From	To	Pld	W	D	L	GF	GA	GD
Canada	2001	2023	4	3	0	1	10	4	+6
Costa Rica	1995	2022	5	3	1	1	10	3	+7
El Salvador	2019	2023	2	2	0	0	8	0	+8
Guatemala	2010	2013	2	2	0	0	5	1	+4
Haiti	2017	2017	1	0	1	0	3	3	0
Honduras	2002	2014	3	2	1	0	14	7	+7
Jamaica	1998	2014	4	2	1	1	7	3	+4
Mexico	1996	2025	7	1	1	5	6	11	−5
Panama	2018	2020	2	2	0	0	4	0	+4
Trinidad and Tobago	2006	2019	2	1	1	0	2	0	+2
United States	1993	2025	4	2	0	2	7	6	+1
Total	1993	2025	34	19	6	9	74	36	+38

=== CONMEBOL ===
As of 1 October 2026

Opponent	From	To	Pld	W	D	L	GF	GA	GD
Argentina	1992	2010	7	1	0	6	4	15	−11
Bolivia	1999	2025	4	3	1	0	7	1	+6
Brazil	1989	2026	15	1	2	12	10	40	−30
Chile	2008	2019	3	1	1	1	4	4	0
Colombia	2003	2023	6	1	1	4	4	9	−5
Ecuador	1995	2026	5	2	3	0	5	1	+4
Paraguay	1995	2025	12	5	5	2	17	12	+5
Peru	1967	2023	8	2	3	3	8	6	+2
Uruguay	1985	2026	11	3	4	4	23	27	−4
Venezuela	2010	2026	6	1	4	1	7	9	−2
Total	1967	2026	73	21	21	31	83	117	−34

=== OFC ===
As of 5 October 2026

Opponent	From	To	Pld	W	D	L	GF	GA	GD
New Zealand	1981	2026	7	4	0	3	12	9	+3
Australia	2021	2021	1	1	0	0	2	1	+1
Total	1981	2026	8	5	0	3	14	10	+4

=== UEFA ===
As of 25 June 2026

Opponent	From	To	Pld	W	D	L	GF	GA	GD
Austria	2007	2007	1	0	1	0	0	0	0
Azerbaijan	2012	2012	1	1	0	0	2	0	+2
Belarus	2013	2013	1	0	0	1	0	1	−1
Belgium	1999	2018	6	2	2	2	11	8	+3
Bosnia and Herzegovina	2006	2016	3	1	1	1	6	4	+2
Bulgaria	1976	2016	6	1	1	4	10	13	−3
Croatia	1997	2022	4	1	2	1	5	5	0
Cyprus	2014	2014	1	1	0	0	1	0	+1
Czech Republic	1998	2011	3	1	2	0	1	0	+1
Denmark	1971	2010	2	1	0	1	5	4	+1
England	1995	2026	4	1	1	2	4	5	−1
Finland	2006	2009	2	2	0	0	7	1	+6
France	1994	2012	6	1	1	4	5	14	−9
Germany	2004	2023	4	2	1	1	8	7	+1
Greece	2005	2014	2	1	1	0	1	0	+1
Hungary	1993	2004	2	0	0	2	2	4	−2
Iceland	1971	2026	4	4	0	0	9	3	+6
Israel	1973	1977	7	0	0	7	2	17	−15
Italy	1936	2013	3	0	1	2	4	13	−9
Kazakhstan	1997	2005	3	2	1	0	10	2	+8
Latvia	2005	2013	2	1	1	0	5	2	+3
Malta	2006	2006	1	1	0	0	1	0	+1
Montenegro	2007	2007	1	1	0	0	2	0	+2
Netherlands	2009	2026	4	0	2	2	4	8	−4
Norway	2002	2002	1	0	0	1	0	3	−3
Poland	1981	2018	7	2	0	5	10	14	−4
Romania	1974	2003	4	0	1	3	3	12	−9
Russia	1978	2002	4	1	0	3	3	11	−8
Scotland	1995	2026	4	2	2	0	3	0	+3
Serbia	1961	2013	9	3	0	6	6	20	−14
Slovakia	2000	2004	3	2	1	0	5	2	+3
Spain	2001	2022	2	1	0	1	2	2	0
Sweden	1936	2026	7	1	4	2	9	13	−4
Switzerland	2007	2018	2	1	0	1	4	5	−1
Turkey	1997	2023	3	2	0	1	5	3	+2
Ukraine	2002	2018	3	1	0	2	2	3	−1
Wales	1992	1992	1	0	0	1	0	1	−1
Total	1936	2026	120	39	25	56	152	197	−45

== FIFA World Ranking ==
As of 20 February 2022, after the match against Saudi Arabia.

Best Ranking Best Mover Worst Ranking Worst Mover

Japan's FIFA World Ranking History
Rank	Year	Games Played	Won	Lost	Drawn	Best		Worst	
Rank	Year	Games Played	Won	Lost	Drawn	Rank	Move	Rank	Move
17 (7 October 2026)	2022	2		0		23 (February)	▲3	26	Steady
26	2021	12	10	2	0	26 (November)	▲2	28	▼1
27	2020	4	2	1	1	27	▲1	28	▼0
28	2019	23	15	3	5	26	▲29	33	▼7
50	2018	14	6	3	5	41	▲7	61	▼5
57	2017	13	6	3	4	40	▲7	57	▼11
45	2016	10	7	1	2	45	▲8	58	▼7
53	2015	17	11	5	1	50	▲5	58	▼8
54	2014	13	7	2	4	54	▲2	44	▼4
47	2013	19	8	3	8	21	▲2	48	▼7
22	2012	12	8	2	2	19	▲7	33	▼11
19	2011	15	9	5	1	13	▲12	29	▼2
29	2010	18	8	4	6	29	▲13	46	▼6
43	2009	17	11	3	3	31	▲4	43	▼9
35	2008	19	10	7	2	32	▲4	38	▼6
34	2007	13	7	5	1	30	▲7	46	▼5
47	2006	19	9	4	6	15	▲1	49	▼13
15	2005	20	11	3	6	13	▲5	19	▼4
17	2004	22	17	2	3	17	▲4	29	▼1
29	2003	16	6	5	5	22	▲2	29	▼3
22	2002	13	5	5	3	22	▲8	38	▼4
34	2001	13	6	3	4	26	▲11	44	▼9
38	2000	18	10	6	2	34	▲15	62	▼6
57	1999	7	0	4	3	33	▲0	57	▼13
20	1998	18	7	2	8	9	▲10	30	▼10
14	1997	22	11	7	4	14	▲4	20	▼2
21	1996	13	10	1	2	20	▲6	30	▼2
31	1995	17	6	4	7	31	▲7	41	▼8
36	1994	9	3	4	2	36	▲14	54	▼12
43	1993	16	11	3	2	43	▲23	44	▼1
66	1992						▲		▼

== See also ==
Japan
Men's

- International footballers
- National football team (Results (2020–present))
- National under-23 football team
- National under-20 football team
- National under-17 football team
- National futsal team
- National under-20 futsal team
- National beach soccer team

Women's

- International footballers
- National football team (Results)
- National under-20 football team
- National under-17 football team
- National futsal team
