= Manchukuo national football team =

National association football team in China

Manchukuo
1939–1942
- Association: Football Association of Manchukuo
First colours	Second colours

First international
- Manchukuo 0–6 Japan (Xinjing, Manchukuo; 3 September 1939)

Last international
- Manchukuo 3–1 R.N.G. of China (Xinjing, Manchukuo; 10 August 1942)

Biggest win
- Manchukuo 10–1 Mengjiang (Xinjing, Manchukuo, 8 August 1942)

Biggest defeat
- Japan 7–0 Manchukuo (Tokyo, Japan; 7 June 1940)

The Manchukuo national football team (Chinese: 滿洲國國家足球隊; pinyin: Mǎnzhōuguó Guójiā Zúqiú Duì) was an international football team from Manchukuo and Japanese-occupied eastern Inner Mongolia, created by former Qing Dynasty officials with help from Imperial Japan in 1932. Due to the non-recognition by most countries, Manchukuo was not permitted to join FIFA, and was therefore not eligible to enter the World Cup. Manchuria played three international matches all against Japan during the late 1930s, losing each one of them, conceding 16 goals and scoring no goals.

The first two matches were held in September 1939 as part of the "Championship Games of Amity with Japan, Manchukuo, and China" ( Nichi-Man-Ka Kokan Kyogikai ), a Japanese-organized successor to the Far Eastern Championship Games which had fallen into dysfunction with the outbreak of the Second Sino-Japanese War. The third match took place at the East Asian Games (Toa Taikai), which were held to both celebrate the 2600th Anniversary of the Japanese Empire, but also to celebrate the start of the Greater East Asia Co-Prosperity Sphere.

== List of games played by Manchukuo ==
All scores list Manchuria's goal tally first

Manchukuo's score is shown first in each case.

Manchukuo national football team results
No.	Date	Venue	Opponents	Score	Competition	Manchukuo scorers	Att.	Ref.
1	3 September 1939	National Sports Complex, Xinjing (H)	Japan	0–6	3 Nations Games		—	
2	September 1939	National Sports Complex, Xinjing (H)	P.G. of Republic of China		3 Nations Games		—	
3	7 June 1940	Meiji Jingu Gaien Stadium, Tokyo (A)	Japan	0–7	1940 East Asian Games		—	
4	16 June 1940	Koshien South Ground, Nishinomiya (N)	Philippines	1–1	1940 East Asian Games	Unknown	—	
5	19 June 1940	Osaka (N)	R.N.G. of China	1–0	1940 East Asian Games	Unknown	—	
6	8 August 1942	National Sports Complex, Xinjing (H)	Mengjiang	10–1	Manchukuo 10th Anniversary Tournament	Unknown	—	
7	9 August 1942	National Sports Complex, Xinjing (H)	Japan	1–3	Manchukuo 10th Anniversary Tournament	Unknown	—	
8	10 August 1942	National Sports Complex, Xinjing (H)	R.N.G. of China	3–1	Manchukuo 10th Anniversary Tournament	Unknown	—	
