= Japan national football team results =

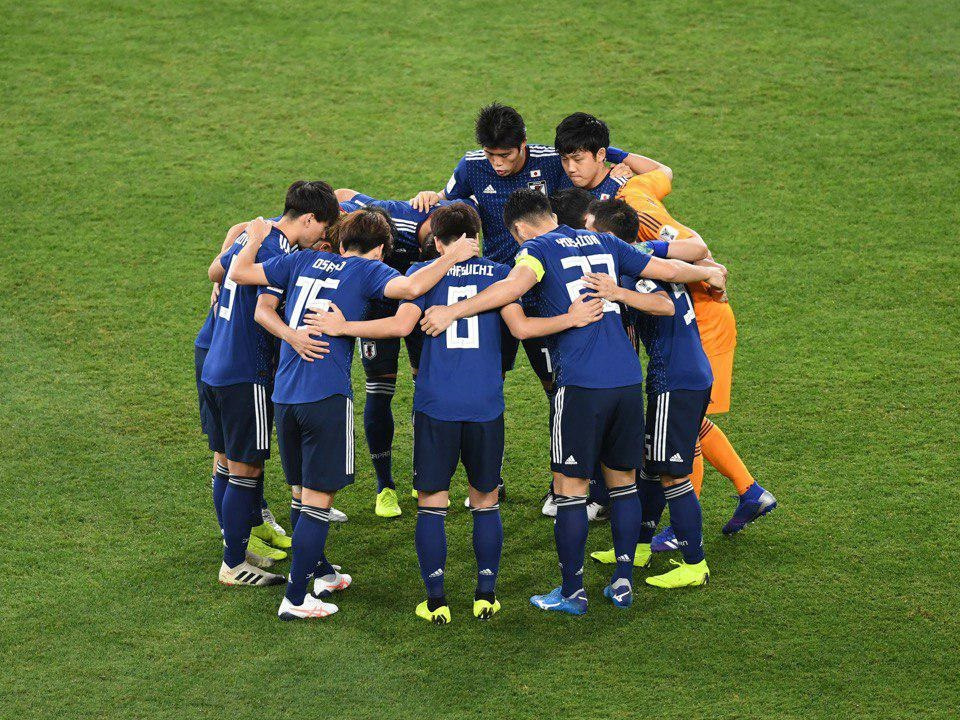
Japanese players before match with Iran at 2019 AFC Asian Cup

This article details the results and fixtures of the Japan national football team.

== Head-to-head ==
- The following table shows Japan's all-time international record, correct as of 13 October 2020.

Confederation	Pld	W	D	L	GF	GA	GD
AFC	498	261	104	133	960	539	+421
CAF	36	21	7	8	56	35	+21
CONCACAF	27	16	5	6	62	30	+32
CONMEBOL	63	16	18	29	63	105	–42
OFC	6	3	0	3	10	8	+2
UEFA	112	34	23	55	137	186	–49
Total	740	350	156	234	1,288	903	+385

On June 15, 2007 Japan Football Association announced, it had checked Japan matches, and changed the count and recognition. According to this decision, Japan has played in these times, till the game, on 2007/06/05, against Colombia:

- Japan National Team's Matches - 1017 games
- Its International A-Matches - 517 games

== Best / Worst Results ==
=== Best ===
As of 15 June 2023

No	Year	Opponent	Result
1	1967	Philippines	15 – 0
2	2021	Mongolia	14 – 0
3	1942	Mengjiang	12 – 0
4	1997	Macau	10 – 0
4	1997	Macau	10 – 0
4	1980	Philippines	10 – 0
4	2021	Myanmar	10 – 0
8	1983	Philippines	10 – 1
8	1987	Nepal	9 – 0
8	2000	Brunei	9 – 0
11	1993	Bangladesh	8 – 0
11	2011	Tajikistan	8 – 0
13	2000	Uzbekistan	8 – 1
13	1971	Philippines	8 – 1
13	1940	Manchukuo	7 – 0
13	1983	Philippines	7 – 0
13	2004	India	7 – 0
18	1984	Brunei	7 – 1
18	1939	Manchukuo	6 – 0
18	1940	China	6 – 0
18	1976	Indonesia	6 – 0
18	1993	Sri Lanka	6 – 0
18	1997	Nepal	6 – 0
18	2006	India	6 – 0
18	2009	Hong Kong	6 – 0
18	2012	Jordan	6 – 0
18	2014	Honduras	6 – 0
18	2015	Afghanistan	6 – 0
18	2019	Mongolia	6 – 0
18	2023	El Salvador	6 – 0

=== Worst ===
As of 1 July 2021

No	Year	Opponent	Result
1	1917	Philippines	2 – 15
2	1936	Italy	0 – 8
3	1934	Dutch East Indies	1 – 7
4	1956	Yugoslavia	2 – 7
4	1964	Yugoslavia	1 – 6
4	1966	Yugoslavia	1 – 6
4	1917	China	0 – 5
4	1942	(Japan) Korea	0 – 5
4	1968	Hungary	0 – 5
4	2001	France	0 – 5
11	1958	Malaya	2 – 6
11	1923	China	1 – 5
11	1927	China	1 – 5
11	1954	South Korea	1 – 5
11	1995	Argentina	1 – 5
11	1995	Brazil	1 – 5
11	1921	China	0 – 4
11	1925	Philippines	0 – 4
11	1964	Czechoslovakia	0 – 4
11	1965	Taiwan	0 – 4
11	1968	Mexico	0 – 4
11	1978	South Korea	0 – 4
11	1982	Romania	0 – 4
11	1999	Uruguay	0 – 4
11	2012	Brazil	0 – 4
11	2014	Brazil	0 – 4
11	2019	Chile	0 – 4

== Japan teams ==
Japan
Men's

- International footballers
- National football team (Results (2020–present))
- National under-23 football team
- National under-20 football team
- National under-17 football team
- National futsal team
- National under-20 futsal team
- National beach soccer team

Women's

- International footballers
- National football team (Results)
- National under-20 football team
- National under-17 football team
- National futsal team

== See also ==
- Japan national football team head-to-head record
- Japan women's national football team results
