= 1938 Far Eastern Championship Games =

The 1938 Far Eastern Games were scheduled to be held in Osaka, Japan, although they were cancelled due to the outbreak of Second Sino-Japanese War. After the cancellation of these 1938 Games the Far Eastern Games ceased to exist and they have been replaced by the Asian Games after World War II.
