= Meiji Jingu Gaien Stadium =

Former stadium in Tokyo

Coordinates: 35°40′41″N 139°42′53″E

- Meiji Jingu Gaien Stadium
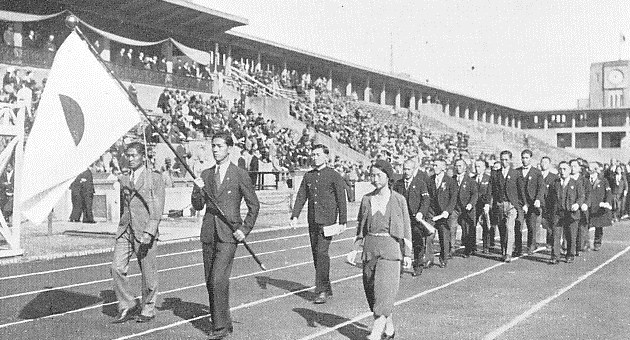
- Meiji Jingu Gaien Stadium in 1933
- Interactive map of Meiji Jingu Gaien Stadium
- Full name: Meiji Jingu Gaien Stadium
- Former names: Nile Kinnick Stadium
- Location: Tokyo, Japan
- Owner: Meiji Shrine
- Operator: Meiji Shrine
- Capacity: 65,000

Construction
- Groundbreaking: 1 March 1922
- Opened: 1 January 1924
- Closed: 31 December 1956
- Demolished: 31 December 1956

Tenant
- 1930 Far Eastern Games

Meiji Jingu Gaien Stadium (明治神宮外苑競技場) was a multi-use stadium in Tokyo, Japan, that could hold up to 65,000 spectators. It was the main venue for the 1930 Far Eastern Games. During the Allied occupation of Japan, from 1945 to 1952, it was renamed Nile Kinnick Stadium by the Eighth Army in honor of the winner of the 1939 Heisman Trophy who died as a naval aviator in 1943. The stadium was demolished to make room for Tokyo Olympic Stadium in 1956.

| Preceded by Tokyo Koto-shihan ground Tokyo | Emperor's Cup; Final Venue; 1924–1929 | Succeeded by Koshien Stadium; Nishinomiya |
| Preceded by Koshien Stadium; Nishinomiya | Emperor's Cup; Final Venue; 1931 | Succeeded by Koshien Stadium; Nishinomiya |
| Preceded by Koshien Stadium; Nishinomiya | Emperor's Cup; Final Venue; 1933–1935 | Succeeded by Toyama Army ground Tokyo |
| Preceded by Toyama Army ground Tokyo | Emperor's Cup; Final Venue; 1937–1940 | Succeeded by Univ. of Tokyo Stadium; Tokyo |
