= Japan at the 1992 Winter Olympics =

- IOC code: JPN
- NOC: Japanese Olympic Committee
- Website: www.joc.or.jp (in Japanese and English)

in Albertville, France 8–23 February 1992
- Competitors: 60 in 11 sports
- Flag bearer: Tsutomu Kawasaki
- Medals Ranked 11th: Gold 1 Silver 2 Bronze 4 Total 7

Winter Olympics appearances (overview)
- 1928; 1932; 1936; 1948; 1952; 1956; 1960; 1964; 1968; 1972; 1976; 1980; 1984; 1988; 1992; 1994; 1998; 2002; 2006; 2010; 2014; 2018; 2022; 2026

Japan was represented at the 1992 Winter Olympics in Albertville, France by the Japanese Olympic Committee.

In total, 60 athletes including 40 men and 20 women represented Japan in 11 different sports including alpine skiing, biathlon, bobsleigh, cross-country skiing, figure skating, freestyle skiing, luge, Nordic combined, short track speed skating, ski jumping and speed skating.

Japan won seven medals at the games including one gold, two silver and four bronze across four different sports including one in figure skating, one in Nordic combined, four in speed skating and one in short track speed skating.

== Competitors ==
In total, 60 athletes represented Japan at the 1992 Winter Olympics in Albertville, France across 11 different sports.

Sport	Men	Women	Total
Alpine skiing	4	2	6
Biathlon	2	1	3
Bobsleigh	4	–	4
Cross-country skiing	2	4	6
Figure skating	3	3	6
Freestyle skiing	1	0	1
Luge	3	0	3
Nordic combined	4	–	4
Short track speed skating	4	4	8
Ski jumping	4	–	4
Speed skating	9	6	15
Total	40	20	60

== Medalists ==
Japan won a total of seven medals at the games including one gold, two silver and four bronze.

Medal	Name	Sport	Event	Date
Gold	Reiichi Mikata; Takanori Kono; Kenji Ogiwara	Nordic combined	Men's team	17 February
Silver	Toshiyuki Kuroiwa	Speed skating	Men's 500 metres	15 February
Silver	Midori Ito	Figure skating	Ladies' singles	21 February
Bronze	Seiko Hashimoto	Speed skating	Women's 1500 metres	12 February
Bronze	Junichi Inoue	Speed skating	Men's 500 metres	15 February
Bronze	Yukinori Miyabe	Speed skating	Men's 1000 metres	18 February
Bronze	Yuichi Akasaka; Tatsuyoshi Ishihara; Toshinobu Kawai; Tsutomu Kawasaki	Short track speed skating	Men's 5000 metre relay	22 February

== Alpine skiing ==
In total, six Japanese athletes participated in the alpine skiing events – Takuya Ishioka, Emi Kawabata, Kiminobu Kimura, Tetsuya Okabe, Tsuyoshi Tomii and Sachiko Yamamoto.

Men

Athlete	Event	Race 1	Race 2	Total	
Athlete	Event	Time	Time	Time	Rank
Tsuyoshi Tomii	Downhill			1:54.23	25
Tsuyoshi Tomii	Super-G			DNF	–
Takuya Ishioka	Super-G			1:17.81	41
Kiminobu Kimura	Super-G			1:17.06	33
Tsuyoshi Tomii	Giant slalom	1:13.36	DNF	DNF	–
Takuya Ishioka	Giant slalom	1:09.28	1:06.64	2:15.92	29
Kiminobu Kimura	Giant slalom	1:07.20	1:04.90	2:12.10	21
Takuya Ishioka	Slalom	DNF	–	DNF	–
Kiminobu Kimura	Slalom	DNF	–	DNF	–
Tetsuya Okabe	Slalom	54.99	54.49	1:49.48	18

Men's combined

Athlete	Downhill	Slalom		Total	
Athlete	Time	Time 1	Time 2	Points	Rank
Kiminobu Kimura	1:50.98	49.47	52.08	64.14	15
Takuya Ishioka	1:49.29	49.48	52.94	51.83	9

Women

Athlete	Event	Race 1	Race 2	Total	
Athlete	Event	Time	Time	Time	Rank
Sachiko Yamamoto	Downhill			1:58.52	26
Emi Kawabata	Downhill			1:54.52	11
Sachiko Yamamoto	Super-G			1:27.54	33
Emi Kawabata	Super-G			1:27.31	31
Emi Kawabata	Giant slalom	1:10.44	DSQ	DSQ	–
Sachiko Yamamoto	Slalom	DNF	–	DNF	–

Women's combined

Athlete	Downhill	Slalom		Total	
Athlete	Time	Time 1	Time 2	Points	Rank
Sachiko Yamamoto	1:30.70	36.56	DNF	DNF	–
Emi Kawabata	1:27.13	37.56	37.81	66.10	13

== Biathlon ==
In total, three Japanese athletes participated in the biathlon events – Yoshiko Honda-Mikami, Atsushi Kazama and Misao Kodate.

Men

Event	Athlete	Misses ^{1}	Time	Rank
10 km Sprint	Atsushi Kazama	6	30:34.7	78
10 km Sprint	Misao Kodate	3	28:07.0	36

Event	Athlete	Time	Misses	Adjusted time ^{2}	Rank
20 km	Atsushi Kazama	58:32.8	6	1'04:32.8	63
20 km	Misao Kodate	58:53.1	2	1'00:53.1	28

Women

Event	Athlete	Misses ^{1}	Time	Rank
7.5 km Sprint	Yoshiko Honda-Mikami	2	26:57.3	22

Event	Athlete	Time	Misses	Adjusted time ^{2}	Rank
15 km	Yoshiko Honda-Mikami	54:55.8	3	57:55.8	35

^{1} A penalty loop of 150 metres had to be skied per missed target.
^{2} One minute added per missed target.

== Bobsleigh ==
In total, four Japanese athletes participated in the bobsleigh events – Naomi Takewaki, Fuminori Tsushima, Toshio Wakita and Ryoji Yamazaki.

Sled	Athletes	Event	Run 1		Run 2		Run 3		Run 4		Total	
Sled	Athletes	Event	Time	Rank	Time	Rank	Time	Rank	Time	Rank	Time	Rank
JPN-1	Naomi Takewaki; Fuminori Tsushima	Two-man	1:01.74	26	1:01.99	22	1:01.77	16	1:01.95	19	4:07.45	21
JPN-2	Toshio Wakita; Ryoji Yamazaki	Two-man	1:01.22	19	1:01.65	18	1:02.03	19	1:01.96	20	4:06.86	19

Sled	Athletes	Event	Run 1		Run 2		Run 3		Run 4		Total	
Sled	Athletes	Event	Time	Rank	Time	Rank	Time	Rank	Time	Rank	Time	Rank
JPN-1	Toshio Wakita; Ryoji Yamazaki; Fuminori Tsushima; Naomi Takewaki	Four-man	59.23	21	59.30	18	59.33	17	59.38	17	3:57.24	17

== Cross-country skiing ==
In total, six Japanese athletes participated in the cross-country skiing events – Fumiko Aoki, Naomi Hoshikawa, Hiroyuki Imai, Yumi Inomata, Miwa Ota and Kazunari Sasaki.

Men

Event	Athlete	Race	
Event	Athlete	Time	Rank
10 km C	Kazunari Sasaki	31:31.4	46
10 km C	Hiroyuki Imai	30:17.3	27
15 km pursuit^{1} F	Kazunari Sasaki	43:08.6	35
15 km pursuit^{1} F	Hiroyuki Imai	42:32.8	29
30 km C	Kazunari Sasaki	1'30:35.9	40
30 km C	Hiroyuki Imai	1'29:35.6	32
50 km F	Kazunari Sasaki	2'17:20.1	40
50 km F	Hiroyuki Imai	2'13:33.0	25

^{1} Starting delay based on 10 km results.
C = Classical style, F = Freestyle

Women

Event	Athlete	Race	
Event	Athlete	Time	Rank
5 km C	Yumi Inomata	16:49.4	54
5 km C	Naomi Hoshikawa	16:13.2	48
5 km C	Miwa Ota	16:03.1	43
5 km C	Fumiko Aoki	15:33.0	30
10 km pursuit^{2} F	Yumi Inomata	31:58.6	47
10 km pursuit^{2} F	Miwa Ota	31:17.3	43
10 km pursuit^{2} F	Naomi Hoshikawa	30:10.8	34
10 km pursuit^{2} F	Fumiko Aoki	28:44.4	19
15 km C	Miwa Ota	DNF	–
15 km C	Naomi Hoshikawa	49:46.2	42
15 km C	Fumiko Aoki	48:30.2	37
30 km F	Fumiko Aoki	1'36:21.9	44
30 km F	Naomi Hoshikawa	1'35:29.4	42
30 km F	Miwa Ota	1'35:19.4	41

^{2} Starting delay based on 5 km results.
C = Classical style, F = Freestyle

Women's 4 × 5 km relay

Athletes	Race	
Athletes	Time	Rank
Miwa Ota; Fumiko Aoki; Naomi Hoshikawa; Yumi Inomata	1'04:09.3	12

== Figure skating ==
In total, six Japanese athletes participated in the Yfigure skating events – Rena Inoue, Midori Ito, Masakazu Kagiyama, Tomoaki Koyama, Mitsuhiro Murata and Yuka Sato.

Men

Athlete	SP	FS	TFP	Rank
Mitsuhiro Murata	22	23	34.0	23
Masakazu Kagiyama	11	15	20.5	13

Women

Athlete	SP	FS	TFP	Rank
Yuka Sato	7	7	10.5	7
Midori Ito	4	2	4.0	2nd place, silver medalist(s)

Pairs

Athletes	SP	FS	TFP	Rank
Rena Inoue; Tomoaki Koyama	14	14	21.0	14

== Freestyle skiing ==
In total, one Japanese athlete participated in the freestyle skiing events – Osamu Yamazaki.

Men

Athlete	Event	Qualification			Final		
Athlete	Event	Time	Points	Rank	Time	Points	Rank
Osamu Yamazaki	Moguls	35.31	14.49	40	did not advance		

== Luge ==
In total, three Japanese athletes participated in the luge events – Atsushi Sasaki, Yuji Sasaki and Kazuhiko Takamatsu.

Men

Athlete	Run 1		Run 2		Run 3		Run 4		Total	
Athlete	Time	Rank	Time	Rank	Time	Rank	Time	Rank	Time	Rank
Kazuhiko Takamatsu	46.283	20	46.065	17	46.838	18	46.614	17	3:05.800	17

(Men's) Doubles

Athletes	Run 1		Run 2		Total	
Athletes	Time	Rank	Time	Rank	Time	Rank
Atsushi Sasaki; Yuji Sasaki	47.776	19	47.566	18	1:35.342	18

== Nordic combined ==
In total, four Japanese athletes participated in the Nordic combined events – Masashi Abe, Takanori Kono, Reiichi Mikata and Kenji Ogiwara.

Men's individual

Events:

- normal hill ski jumping (Best two out of three jumps)
- 15 km cross-country skiing (start delay, based on ski jumping results)

Athlete	Event	Ski jumping		Cross-country		Total
Athlete	Event	Points	Rank	Start at	Time	Rank
Takanori Kono	Individual	197.4	25	+3:27.4	48:46.3	19
Masashi Abe	Individual	197.9	24	+3:24.0	51:08.5	30
Kenji Ogiwara	Individual	215.3	6	+1:28.0	46:25.5	7
Reiichi Mikata	Individual	226.1	2	+16.0	52:09.1	34

Men's team

Events:

- normal hill ski jumping (Best two out of three jumps per team member were counted.)
- 10 km cross-country skiing (start delay, based on ski jumping results)

Athletes	Ski jumping		Cross-country		Total
Athletes	Points	Rank	Start at	Time	Rank
Reiichi Mikata; Takanori Kono; Kenji Ogiwara	645.1	1	+0.0	1'23:36.5	1st place, gold medalist(s)

== Short track speed skating ==
In total, eight Japanese athletes participated in the short track speed skating events – Yuichi Akasaka, Tatsuyoshi Ishihara, Toshinobu Kawai, Tsutomu Kawasaki, Mie Naito, Rie Sato, Hiromi Takeuchi and Nobuko Yamada.

Men

Athlete	Event	Round one		Quarterfinals		Semifinals		Finals	
Athlete	Event	Time	Rank	Time	Rank	Time	Rank	Time	Final rank
Tsutomu Kawasaki	1000 m	1:38.75	2 Q	1:35.66	4	did not advance			
Toshinobu Kawai	1000 m	1:42.28	3	did not advance					
Tatsuyoshi Ishihara	1000 m	1:34.11	2 Q	1:34.86	4	did not advance			
Yuichi Akasaka; Tatsuyoshi Ishihara; Toshinobu Kawai; Tsutomu Kawasaki	5000 m relay			7:22.43	2 Q	7:22.84	1 QA	7:18.18	3rd place, bronze medalist(s)

Women

Athlete	Event	Round one		Quarterfinals		Semifinals		Finals	
Athlete	Event	Time	Rank	Time	Rank	Time	Rank	Time	Final rank
Nobuko Yamada	500 m	48.79	1 Q	57.69	3	did not advance			
Mie Naito; Rie Sato; Hiromi Takeuchi; Nobuko Yamada	3000 m relay					4:37.08	1 Q	4:44.50	4

== Ski jumping ==
In total, four Japanese athletes participated in the ski jumping events – Masahiko Harada, Jiro Kamiharako, Noriaki Kasai and Kenji Suda.

Athlete	Event	Jump 1		Jump 2		Total	
Athlete	Event	Distance	Points	Distance	Points	Points	Rank
Noriaki Kasai	Normal hill	77.5	89.0	83.5	98.1	187.1	31
Kenji Suda	Normal hill	80.0	93.5	79.5	91.2	184.7	39
Jiro Kamiharako	Normal hill	80.0	94.0	80.5	94.8	188.8	28
Masahiko Harada	Normal hill	83.5	98.6	84.0	102.4	201.0	14
Jiro Kamiharako	Large hill	100.0	79.5	97.5	76.0	155.5	25
Noriaki Kasai	Large hill	101.5	82.1	84.5	72.3	154.4	26
Kenji Suda	Large hill	106.5	91.1	97.5	77.0	168.1	17
Masahiko Harada	Large hill	113.5	102.4	116.0	108.9	211.3	4

Men's team large hill

Athletes	Result	
Athletes	Points ^{1}	Rank
Masahiko Harada; Kenji Suda; Jiro Kamiharako; Noriaki Kasai	571.0	4

^{1} Four teams members performed two jumps each. The best three were counted.

== Speed skating ==
In total, 15 Japanese athletes participated in the speed skating events – Toru Aoyanagi, Yuji Fujimoto, Yoko Fukazawa, Seiko Hashimoto, Junichi Inoue, Toshihiko Itokawa, Yumi Kaeriyama, Seiko Krohn, Toshiyuki Kuroiwa, Yasunori Miyabe, Yukinori Miyabe, Kazuhiro Sato, Kyoko Shimazaki, Keiji Shirahata, Noriko Toda and Mie Uehara.

Men

Event	Athlete	Race	
Event	Athlete	Time	Rank
500 m	Yukinori Miyabe	38.12	18
500 m	Yasunori Miyabe	37.49	5
500 m	Junichi Inoue	37.26	3rd place, bronze medalist(s)
500 m	Toshiyuki Kuroiwa	37.18	2nd place, silver medalist(s)
1000 m	Yasunori Miyabe	1:16.52	19
1000 m	Yuji Fujimoto	1:15.78	11
1000 m	Toshiyuki Kuroiwa	1:15.56	9
1000 m	Yukinori Miyabe	1:14.92	3rd place, bronze medalist(s)
1500 m	Keiji Shirahata	2:05.47	44
1500 m	Kazuhiro Sato	2:00.51	28
1500 m	Toru Aoyanagi	1:57.36	12
1500 m	Yukinori Miyabe	1:56.99	9
5000 m	Keiji Shirahata	7:24.95	22
5000 m	Toshihiko Itokawa	7:20.50	18
5000 m	Kazuhiro Sato	7:19.69	17
10,000 m	Keiji Shirahata	14:47.56	18
10,000 m	Toshihiko Itokawa	14:42.35	13
10,000 m	Kazuhiro Sato	14:28.30	5

Women

Event	Athlete	Race	
Event	Athlete	Time	Rank
500 m	Yoko Fukazawa	42.18	24
500 m	Noriko Toda	41.97	23
500 m	Seiko Hashimoto	41.32	12
500 m	Kyoko Shimazaki	40.98	7
1000 m	Yoko Fukazawa	1:25.00	24
1000 m	Noriko Toda	1:24.96	23
1000 m	Kyoko Shimazaki	1:24.28	18
1000 m	Seiko Hashimoto	1:22.63	5
1500 m	Yumi Kaeriyama	2:10.75	19
1500 m	Mie Uehara	2:09.33	11
1500 m	Seiko Hashimoto	2:06.88	3rd place, bronze medalist(s)
3000 m	Mie Uehara	4:37.54	17
3000 m	Yumi Kaeriyama	4:33.53	13
3000 m	Seiko Krohn	4:32.12	12
5000 m	Mie Uehara	7:54.15	14
5000 m	Yumi Kaeriyama	7:50.77	12
5000 m	Seiko Hashimoto	7:47.65	9
