= Japan at the 1994 Winter Olympics =

- IOC code: JPN
- NOC: Japanese Olympic Committee
- Website: www.joc.or.jp (in Japanese and English)

in Lillehammer
- Competitors: 65 in 11 sports
- Flag bearer: Reiichi Mikata
- Medals Ranked 11th: Gold 1 Silver 2 Bronze 2 Total 5

Winter Olympics appearances (overview)
- 1928; 1932; 1936; 1948; 1952; 1956; 1960; 1964; 1968; 1972; 1976; 1980; 1984; 1988; 1992; 1994; 1998; 2002; 2006; 2010; 2014; 2018; 2022; 2026

Japan competed at the 1994 Winter Olympics in Lillehammer, Norway, from February 12 to February 27, 1994. A total of 65 athletes competed with 45 officers. The flag bearer is Nordic combined skier Reiichi Mikata, while the captain of the delegation is speed skater Seiko Hashimoto.

The Nordic combined team was able to retain the gold medal from the same previous achievement in Albertville 1992. Overall the Japanese team won 1 gold, 2 silver and 2 bronze, and managed to finish in eleventh place on the medal table.

As Nagano would be the host city for the following Winter Olympics, a traditional Japanese segment was performed at the end of the closing ceremony.

== Medalists ==
Medal	Name	Sport	Event	Date
Gold	Takanori Kono; Masashi Abe; Kenji Ogiwara	Nordic combined	Men's team	February 24
Silver	Takanori Kono	Nordic combined	Men's individual	February 19
Silver	Jinya Nishikata; Takanobu Okabe; Noriaki Kasai; Masahiko Harada	Ski jumping	Men's team large hill	February 22
Bronze	Manabu Horii	Speed skating	Men's 500 m	February 14
Bronze	Hiromi Yamamoto	Speed skating	Women's 5000 m	February 25

Medals by sport
Sport	1st place, gold medalist(s)	2nd place, silver medalist(s)	3rd place, bronze medalist(s)	Total
Nordic combined	1	1	0	2
Ski jumping	0	1	0	1
Speed skating	0	0	2	2
Total	1	2	2	5

== Competitors ==
The following is the list of number of competitors in the Games.

Sport	Men	Women	Total
Alpine skiing	4	1	5
Biathlon	1	1	2
Bobsleigh	5	–	5
Cross-country skiing	5	2	7
Figure skating	2	2	4
Freestyle skiing	2	1	3
Luge	3	0	3
Nordic combined	4	–	4
Short track speed skating	4	1	5
Ski jumping	4	–	4
Speed skating	9	8	17
Total	43	16	59

== Alpine skiing ==
Men

Athlete	Event	Race 1	Race 2	Total	
Athlete	Event	Time	Time	Time	Rank
Kiminobu Kimura	Super-G			1:36.38	33
Kiminobu Kimura	Giant Slalom	1:31.86	1:26.64	2:58.50	26
Gaku Hirasawa	Slalom	DNF	–	DNF	–
Takuya Ishioka	Slalom	1:05.94	1:04.40	2:10.34	19
Kiminobu Kimura	Slalom	1:05.26	1:02.71	2:07.97	18
Tetsuya Okabe	Slalom	1:03.98	DNF	DNF	–

Men's combined

Athlete	Downhill	Slalom		Total	
Athlete	Time	Time 1	Time 2	Total time	Rank
Kiminobu Kimura	1:41.73	51.45	DNF	DNF	–
Takuya Ishioka	1:40.55	DNF	–	DNF	–

Women

Athlete	Event	Race 1	Race 2	Total	
Athlete	Event	Time	Time	Time	Rank
Emi Kawabata	Downhill			1:38.29	21
Emi Kawabata	Super-G			1:23.90	24

Women's combined

Athlete	Downhill	Slalom		Total	
Athlete	Time	Time 1	Time 2	Total time	Rank
Emi Kawabata	1:29.00	56.50	52.72	3:18.22	17

== Biathlon ==
Men

Event	Athlete	Misses ^{1}	Time	Rank
10 km Sprint	Misao Kodate	3	31:40.2	42

Event	Athlete	Time	Misses	Adjusted time ^{2}	Rank
20 km	Misao Kodate	58:34.6	7	1'05:34.6	62

Women

Event	Athlete	Misses ^{1}	Time	Rank
7.5 km Sprint	Yoshiko Honda-Mikami	2	28:37.3	44

Event	Athlete	Time	Misses	Adjusted time ^{2}	Rank
15 km	Yoshiko Honda-Mikami	54:00.5	6	1'00:00.5	54

^{1} A penalty loop of 150 metres had to be skied per missed target.
^{2} One minute added per missed target.

== Bobsleigh ==
Sled	Athletes	Event	Run 1		Run 2		Run 3		Run 4		Total	
Sled	Athletes	Event	Time	Rank	Time	Rank	Time	Rank	Time	Rank	Time	Rank
JPN-1	Toshio Wakita; Takashi Ohori	Two-man	53.43	20	53.51	16	53.47	18	53.69	18	3:34.10	19
JPN-2	Naomi Takewaki; Hiroshi Suzuki	Two-man	53.08	16	53.72	22	53.47	18	53.73	19	3:34.00	18

Sled	Athletes	Event	Run 1		Run 2		Run 3		Run 4		Total	
Sled	Athletes	Event	Time	Rank	Time	Rank	Time	Rank	Time	Rank	Time	Rank
JPN-1	Naomi Takewaki; Hiroyuki Oshima; Hiroshi Suzuki; Takashi Ohori	Four-man	52.56	21	52.83	23	52.55	12	52.73	16	3:30.67	18

== Cross-country skiing ==
Men

Event	Athlete	Race	
Event	Athlete	Time	Rank
10 km C	Masaaki Kozu	28:20.2	72
10 km C	Hiroyuki Imai	26:48.8	40
10 km C	Mitsuo Horigome	26:36.2	31
10 km C	Kazunari Sasaki	26:12.1	25
15 km pursuit^{1} F	Masaaki Kozu	43:30.1	54
15 km pursuit^{1} F	Hiroyuki Imai	41:59.8	42
15 km pursuit^{1} F	Mitsuo Horigome	40:47.0	27
15 km pursuit^{1} F	Kazunari Sasaki	39:40.5	18
30 km F	Kazutoshi Nagahama	1'22:24.9	48
30 km F	Kazunari Sasaki	1'20:52.1	39
30 km F	Hiroyuki Imai	1'18:03.7	20
30 km F	Mitsuo Horigome	1'17:49.4	19
50 km C	Kazutoshi Nagahama	2'22:30.2	48
50 km C	Hiroyuki Imai	2'17:55.2	28
50 km C	Kazunari Sasaki	2'16:51.7	24

^{1} Starting delay based on 10 km results.
C = Classical style, F = Freestyle

Men's 4 × 10 km relay

Athletes	Race	
Athletes	Time	Rank
Hiroyuki Imai; Kazutoshi Nagahama; Kazunari Sasaki; Masaaki Kozu	1'49:42.1	14

Women

Event	Athlete	Race	
Event	Athlete	Time	Rank
5 km C	Sumiko Yokoyama	16:30.5	50
5 km C	Fumiko Aoki	15:41.9	26
10 km pursuit^{2} F	Sumiko Yokoyama	32:48.0	36
10 km pursuit^{2} F	Fumiko Aoki	30:00.4	16
15 km F	Sumiko Yokoyama	46:00.4	36
15 km F	Fumiko Aoki	43:01.4	11
30 km C	Sumiko Yokoyama	1'37:14.7	45
30 km C	Fumiko Aoki	1'32:22.3	26

^{2} Starting delay based on 5 km results.
C = Classical style, F = Freestyle

== Figure skating ==
Men

Athlete	SP	FS	TFP	Rank
Fumihiro Oikawa	21	22	32.5	22
Masakazu Kagiyama	11	11	16.5	12

Women

Athlete	SP	FS	TFP	Rank
Rena Inoue	19	18	27.0	18
Yuka Sato	7	5	8.5	5

== Freestyle skiing ==
Men

Athlete	Event	Qualification			Final		
Athlete	Event	Time	Points	Rank	Time	Points	Rank
Gota Miura	Moguls	26.49	20.15	27	did not advance		
Hiroshi Machii	Aerials		153.53	20	did not advance		

Women

Athlete	Event	Qualification			Final		
Athlete	Event	Time	Points	Rank	Time	Points	Rank
Tae Satoya	Moguls	30.42	23.32	10 Q	30.06	23.18	11

== Luge ==
Men

Athlete	Run 1		Run 2		Run 3		Run 4		Total	
Athlete	Time	Rank	Time	Rank	Time	Rank	Time	Rank	Time	Rank
Atsushi Sasaki	52.460	29	52.661	30	52.241	27	52.434	27	3:29.796	28
Yuji Sasaki	51.970	24	52.279	26	52.286	28	51.943	24	3:28.478	25
Kazuhiko Takamatsu	51.658	22	51.471	19	51.782	23	52.192	25	3:27.103	22

(Men's) Doubles

Athletes	Run 1		Run 2		Total	
Athletes	Time	Rank	Time	Rank	Time	Rank
Atsushi Sasaki; Yuji Sasaki	50.782	18	49.342	15	1:40.124	18

== Nordic combined ==
Men's individual

Events:

- normal hill ski jumping
- 15 km cross-country skiing (Start delay, based on ski jumping results.)

Athlete	Event	Ski Jumping		Cross-country time	Total rank
Athlete	Event	Points	Rank	Cross-country time	Total rank
Masashi Abe	Individual	207.0	14	43:21.7	10
Junichi Kogawa	Individual	220.5	8	45:33.8	19
Kenji Ogiwara	Individual	231.0	6	41:16.7	4
Takanori Kono	Individual	239.5	4	40:25.4	2nd place, silver medalist(s)

Men's Team

Three participants per team.

Events:

- normal hill ski jumping
- 10 km cross-country skiing (Start delay, based on ski jumping results.)

Athletes	Ski jumping		Cross-country time	Total rank
Athletes	Points	Rank	Cross-country time	Total rank
Takanori Kono; Kenji Ogiwara; Masashi Abe	733.5	1	1'22:51.8	1st place, gold medalist(s)

== Short track speed skating ==
Men

Athlete	Event	Round one		Quarter finals		Semi finals		Finals	
Athlete	Event	Time	Rank	Time	Rank	Time	Rank	Time	Final rank
Jun Uematsu	500 m	44.50	2 Q	44.20	4	did not advance			
Satoru Terao	500 m	44.88	2 Q	44.27	3	did not advance			
Satoru Terao	1000 m	1:31.11	1 Q	1:29.64	2 Q	1:43.58	4 QB	1:33.39	4
Jun Uematsu	1000 m	1:32.67	3	did not advance					
Yuichi Akasaka; Tatsuyoshi Ishihara; Satoru Terao; Jun Uematsu	5000 m relay					7:15.85	3 QB	7:19.11	5

Women

Athlete	Event	Round one		Quarter finals		Semi finals		Finals	
Athlete	Event	Time	Rank	Time	Rank	Time	Rank	Time	Final rank
Ayako Tsubaki	500 m	48.49	1 Q	47.51	3	did not advance			
Ayako Tsubaki	1000 m	1:39.31	1 Q	1:39.12	3	did not advance			

== Ski jumping ==
Athlete	Event	Jump 1		Jump 2		Total	
Athlete	Event	Distance	Points	Distance	Points	Points	Rank
Masahiko Harada	Normal hill	92.0	120.5	54.5	5.0	125.5	55
Takanobu Okabe	Normal hill	95.0	125.5	95.5	126.5	252.0	9
Jinya Nishikata	Normal hill	99.0	130.0	94.0	123.0	253.0	8
Noriaki Kasai	Normal hill	98.0	134.5	93.0	124.5	259.0	5
Noriaki Kasai	Large hill	110.0	99.0	109.5	97.1	196.1	14
Takanobu Okabe	Large hill	117.0	110.6	128.0	132.9	243.5	4
Jinya Nishikata	Large hill	123.5	120.8	110.0	97.5	218.3	8
Masahiko Harada	Large hill	122.0	121.1	101.0	78.8	199.9	13

Men's team large hill

Athletes	Result	
Athletes	Points ^{1}	Rank
Takanobu Okabe; Jinya Nishikata; Noriaki Kasai; Masahiko Harada	956.9	2nd place, silver medalist(s)

^{1} Four teams members performed two jumps each.

== Speed skating ==
Men

Event	Athlete	Race	
Event	Athlete	Time	Rank
500 m	Yasunori Miyabe	36.72	9
500 m	Junichi Inoue	36.63	6
500 m	Hiroyasu Shimizu	36.60	5
500 m	Manabu Horii	36.53	3rd place, bronze medalist(s)
1000 m	Hiroyasu Shimizu	1:15.01	19
1000 m	Yukinori Miyabe	1:14.28	14
1000 m	Toshiyuki Kuroiwa	1:13.95	11
1000 m	Junichi Inoue	1:13.75	8
1500 m	Toshihiko Itokawa	1:56.67	27
1500 m	Yukinori Miyabe	1:55.56	21
1500 m	Toru Aoyanagi	1:54.85	15
5000 m	Toru Aoyanagi	6:59.88	24
5000 m	Kazuhiro Sato	6:54.83	13
5000 m	Toshihiko Itokawa	6:49.36	6
10,000 m	Kazuhiro Sato	14:18.44	13
10,000 m	Toshihiko Itokawa	14:17.00	11

Women

Event	Athlete	Race	
Event	Athlete	Time	Rank
500 m	Mayumi Yamamoto	41.20	25
500 m	Shiho Kusunose	40.94	18
500 m	Tomomi Okazaki	40.55	14
500 m	Kyoko Shimazaki	40.26	10
1000 m	Mayumi Yamamoto	1:23.15	27
1000 m	Seiko Hashimoto	1:22.31	21
1000 m	Kyoko Shimazaki	1:21.96	18
1000 m	Shiho Kusunose	1:20.37	6
1500 m	Maki Tabata	2:06.79	16
1500 m	Hiromi Yamamoto	2:06.54	15
1500 m	Shiho Kusunose	2:06.20	13
1500 m	Seiko Hashimoto	2:04.98	9
3000 m	Miki Ogasawara	4:25.27	10
3000 m	Hiromi Yamamoto	4:22.37	7
3000 m	Seiko Hashimoto	4:21.07	6
5000 m	Miki Ogasawara	7:30.47	9
5000 m	Seiko Hashimoto	7:29.79	8
5000 m	Hiromi Yamamoto	7:19.68	3rd place, bronze medalist(s)
