= Speed skating at the 1992 Winter Olympics – Women's 500 metres =

Women's 500 metres at the XVI Olympic Winter Games
- Pictogram for speed skating
- Venue: L'anneau de vitesse
- Dates: February 10, 1992
- Competitors: 34 from 12 nations
- Winning time: 40.33

Medalists
1st place, gold medalist(s)		Bonnie Blair; United States
2nd place, silver medalist(s)		Ye Qiaobo; China
3rd place, bronze medalist(s)		Christa Luding-R. Germany

The women's 500 metres in speed skating at the 1992 Winter Olympics took place on 10 February, at the L'anneau de vitesse.

== Records ==
Prior to this competition, the existing world and Olympic records were as follows:

World record	Bonnie Blair (USA)	39.10	Calgary, Canada	22 February 1988
Olympic record	Bonnie Blair (USA)	39.10	Calgary, Canada	22 February 1988

== Results ==
Rank	Pair	Lane	Name	Country	Time	Difference
1st place, gold medalist(s)	5	I	Bonnie Blair	United States	40.33	-
2nd place, silver medalist(s)	2	O	Ye Qiaobo	China	40.51	+0.18
3rd place, bronze medalist(s)	4	I	Christa Luding-Rothenburger	Germany	40.57	+0.24
4	3	I	Monique Garbrecht	Germany	40.63	+0.30
5	1	O	Christine Aaftink	Netherlands	40.66	+0.33
6	6	O	Susan Auch	Canada	40.83	+0.50
7	4	O	Kyoko Shimazaki	Japan	40.98	+0.65
8	5	O	Angela Stahnke	Germany	41.10	+0.77
9	1	I	Yoo Seon-Hee	South Korea	41.28	+0.95
10	14	O	Anke Baier	Germany	41.30	+0.97
11	7	I	Herma Meijer	Netherlands	41.31	+0.98
12	6	I	Seiko Hashimoto	Japan	41.32	+0.99
13	17	I	Xue Ruihong	China	41.47	+1.14
14	8	I	Catriona Le May Doan	Canada	41.59	+1.26
15	8	O	Nataliya Polozkova	Unified Team	41.61	+1.28
16	15	I	Oksana Ravilova	Unified Team	41.73	+1.40
17	12	I	Kristen Talbot	United States	41.77	+1.44
18	9	I	Shelley Rhead-Skarvan	Canada	41.83	+1.50
19	13	I	Liu Yuexi	China	41.85	+1.52
20	10	I	Edel Therese Høiseth	Norway	41.89	+1.56
21	10	O	Mihaela Dascălu	Romania	41.90	+1.57
22	9	O	Peggy Clasen	United States	41.95	+1.62
23	16	O	Noriko Toda	Japan	41.97	+1.64
24	17	O	Yoko Fukazawa	Japan	42.18	+ 1.85
25	13	O	Song Hwa-son	North Korea	42.23	+1.90
26	15	O	Michelle Kline	United States	42.41	+2.08
27	16	I	Chong Chang-suk	North Korea	42.45	+2.12
28	11	O	Kim Chun-wol	North Korea	42.47	+2.14
29	2	I	Yelena Tyushnyakova	Unified Team	42.65	+2.32
30	14	I	Cerasela Hordobețiu	Romania	42.68	+2.35
31	7	O	Lyudmila Prokasheva	Unified Team	43.19	+2.86
32	11	I	Krisztina Egyed	Hungary	43.39	+3.06
-	3	O	Sandra Voetelink	Netherlands	DNF	
-	12	Wang Xiuli	China	DNF		
