= Speed skating at the 1992 Winter Olympics – Women's 1000 metres =

Women's 1000 metres at the XVI Olympic Winter Games
- Pictogram for speed skating
- Venue: L'anneau de vitesse
- Dates: February 14, 1992
- Competitors: 36 from 14 nations
- Winning time: 1:21.90

Medalists
| 1st place, gold medalist(s) | | Bonnie Blair | United States |
| 2nd place, silver medalist(s) | | Ye Qiaobo | China |
| 3rd place, bronze medalist(s) | | Monique Garbrecht | Germany |

The women's 1000 metres in speed skating at the 1992 Winter Olympics took place on 14 February, at the L'anneau de vitesse.

== Records ==
Prior to this competition, the existing world and Olympic records were as follows:

| World record | Christa Rothenburger (GDR) | 1:17.65 | Calgary, Canada | 26 February 1988 |
| Olympic record | Christa Rothenburger (GDR) | 1:17.65 | Calgary, Canada | 26 February 1988 |

== Results ==
| Rank | Pair | Lane | Name | Country | Time | Behind |
|---|---|---|---|---|---|---|
| 1st place, gold medalist(s) | 3 | O | Bonnie Blair | United States | 1:21.90 | - |
| 2nd place, silver medalist(s) | 6 | I | Ye Qiaobo | China | 1:21.92 | +0.02 |
| 3rd place, bronze medalist(s) | 6 | O | Monique Garbrecht | Germany | 1:22.10 | +0.20 |
| 4 | 1 | O | Christine Aaftink | Netherlands | 1:22.60 | +0.70 |
| 5 | 2 | O | Seiko Hashimoto | Japan | 1:22.63 | +0.73 |
| 6 | 10 | O | Mihaela Dascălu | Romania | 1:22.85 | +0.95 |
| 7 | 16 | O | Yelena Tyushnyakova | Unified Team | 1:22.97 | +1.07 |
| 8 | 13 | O | Christa Luding-Rothenburger | Germany | 1:23.06 | +1.16 |
| 9 | 4 | I | Anke Baier | Germany | 1:23.31 | +1.41 |
| 10 | 4 | O | Emese Hunyady | Austria | 1:23.40 | +1.50 |
| 11 | 5 | O | Yoo Seon-hee | South Korea | 1:23.49 | +1.59 |
| 12 | 7 | I | Herma Meijer | Netherlands | 1:23.50 | +1.60 |
| 13 | 10 | I | Edel Therese Høiseth | Norway | 1:23.85 | +1.95 |
| 14 | 3 | I | Angela Stahnke | Germany | 1:24.11 | +2.21 |
| 15 | 9 | O | Oksana Ravilova | Unified Team | 1:24.14 | +2.24 |
| 16 | 2 | I | Sandra Voetelink | Netherlands | 1:24.21 | +2.31 |
| 17 | 11 | O | Susan Auch | Canada | 1:24.27 | +2.37 |
| 18 | 12 | I | Kyoko Shimazaki | Japan | 1:24.28 | +2.38 |
| 18 | 11 | I | Ewa Wasilewska | Poland | 1:24.28 | +2.38 |
| 20 | 7 | O | Nataliya Polozkova | Unified Team | 1:24.30 | +2.40 |
| 21 | 14 | I | Else Ragni Yttredal | Norway | 1:24.54 | +2.64 |
| 22 | 18 | I | Liu Yuexi | China | 1:24.71 | +2.81 |
| 23 | 5 | I | Noriko Toda | Japan | 1:24.96 | +3.06 |
| 24 | 15 | I | Yoko Fukazawa | Japan | 1:25.00 | +3.10 |
| 25 | 9 | I | Shelley Rhead-Skarvan | Canada | 1:25.04 | +3.14 |
| 26 | 18 | O | Chong Chang-suk | North Korea | 1:25.10 | +3.20 |
| 27 | 13 | I | Xue Ruihong | China | 1:25.11 | +3.21 |
| 28 | 1 | I | Yelena Lapuga | Unified Team | 1:25.21 | +3.31 |
| 29 | 12 | O | Peggy Clasen | United States | 1:25.31 | +3.41 |
| 30 | 14 | O | Song Hwa-son | North Korea | 1:25.80 | +3.90 |
| 31 | 8 | O | Catriona Le May Doan | Canada | 1:25.91 | +4.01 |
| 32 | 8 | I | Moira D'Andrea | United States | 1:26.13 | +4.23 |
| 33 | 17 | I | Kim Chun-wol | North Korea | 1:26.49 | +4.59 |
| 34 | 17 | O | Krisztina Egyed | Hungary | 1:27.81 | +5.91 |
| - | 15 | O | Cerasela Hordobețiu | Romania | DNF | |
| - | 16 | I | Michelle Kline | United States | DQ | |
