= Speed skating at the 1990 Asian Winter Games =

- Venue: Makomanai Open Stadium
- Dates: 10–13 March 1990
- Competitors: 58 from 5 nations

Speed skating at the 1990 Winter Asian Games took place in Makomanai Skating Centre Sapporo in the city of Sapporo, Japan with nine events contested — five for men and four for women.

== Schedule ==
F	Final

Event↓/Date →	10th Sat	11th Sun	12th Mon	13th Tue
Men's 500 m	F			
Men's 1000 m			F	
Men's 1500 m		F		
Men's 5000 m	F			
Men's 10000 m				F
Women's 500 m	F			
Women's 1000 m			F	
Women's 1500 m		F		
Women's 3000 m			F	

== Medalists ==
=== Men ===
Event	Gold	Silver	Bronze
500 m	Song Chen; China	Bae Ki-tae; South Korea	Yasushi Kuroiwa; Japan
500 m	Song Chen; China	Bae Ki-tae; South Korea	Yasunori Miyabe; Japan
1000 m	Bae Ki-tae; South Korea	Song Chen; China	Hozumi Moriyama; Japan
1500 m	Bae Ki-tae; South Korea	Toru Aoyanagi; Japan	Lee In-hoon; South Korea
5000 m	Kazuhiro Sato; Japan	Lü Shuhai; China	Oh Yong-seok; South Korea
10000 m	Kazuhiro Sato; Japan	Lü Shuhai; China	Toru Aoyanagi; Japan

=== Women ===
Event	Gold	Silver	Bronze
500 m	Seiko Hashimoto; Japan	Kyoko Shimazaki; Japan	Yoo Sun-hee; South Korea
1000 m	Seiko Hashimoto; Japan	Ye Qiaobo; China	Wang Xiuli; China
1500 m	Seiko Hashimoto; Japan	Wang Xiuli; China	Chong Chang-suk; North Korea
3000 m	Seiko Hashimoto; Japan	Natsue Seki; Japan	Zhang Qing; China

== Medal table ==
Rank	Nation	Gold	Silver	Bronze	Total
1	Japan (JPN)	6	3	4	13
2	South Korea (KOR)	2	1	3	6
3	China (CHN)	1	5	2	8
4	North Korea (PRK)	0	0	1	1
Totals (4 entries)		9	9	10	28

== Participating nations ==
A total of 58 athletes from 5 nations competed in speed skating at the 1990 Asian Winter Games:

- China (16)
- Japan (18)
- Mongolia (2)
- North Korea (12)
- South Korea (10)
