= Speed skating at the 1990 Asian Winter Games – Women's 500 metres =

Women's 500 metres at the 1990 Asian Winter Games
- Venue: Makomanai Open Stadium
- Dates: 10 March 1990
- Competitors: 14 from 4 nations

Medalists
gold medal	Seiko Hashimoto	Japan
silver medal	Kyoko Shimazaki	Japan
bronze medal	Yoo Sun-hee	South Korea

The women's 500 metres at the 1990 Asian Winter Games was held on 10 March 1990 in Sapporo, Japan.

== Records ==
Prior to this competition, the existing world and Games records were as follows.

World Record	Bonnie Blair (USA)	39.10	Calgary, Canada	22 February 1988
Games Record	Seiko Hashimoto (JPN)	41.68	Sapporo, Japan	1 March 1986

== Results ==
Rank	Athlete	Time	Notes
1st place, gold medalist(s)	Seiko Hashimoto (JPN)	41.85	
2nd place, silver medalist(s)	Kyoko Shimazaki (JPN)	42.08	
3rd place, bronze medalist(s)	Yoo Sun-hee (KOR)	42.22	
4	Ye Qiaobo (CHN)	42.31	
5	Xue Ruihong (CHN)	42.34	
6	Wang Xiuli (CHN)	42.44	
7	Yoko Fukazawa (JPN)	42.68	
8	Liang Linhua (CHN)	43.00	
9	Yeon Son-yu (PRK)	43.05	
10	Chihaya Tanaka (JPN)	43.07	
11	Kim Chun-wol (PRK)	43.27	
12	Chong Chang-suk (PRK)	43.27	
13	Kang Sun-ae (PRK)	44.92	
14	Jeong Bae-yeong (KOR)	45.08	
