= Speed skating at the 1990 Asian Winter Games – Women's 1000 metres =

Women's 1000 metres at the 1990 Asian Winter Games
- Venue: Makomanai Open Stadium
- Dates: 12 March 1990
- Competitors: 14 from 4 nations

Medalists
gold medal	Seiko Hashimoto	Japan
silver medal	Ye Qiaobo	China
bronze medal	Wang Xiuli	China

The women's 1000 metres at the 1990 Asian Winter Games was held on 12 March 1990 in Sapporo, Japan.

== Records ==
Prior to this competition, the existing world and Games records were as follows.

World Record	Christa Rothenburger (GDR)	1:17.65	Calgary, Canada	26 February 1988
Games Record	Wang Xiuli (CHN)	1:27.56	Sapporo, Japan	3 March 1986

== Results ==
Rank	Athlete	Time	Notes
1st place, gold medalist(s)	Seiko Hashimoto (JPN)	1:24.46	GR
2nd place, silver medalist(s)	Ye Qiaobo (CHN)	1:25.43	
3rd place, bronze medalist(s)	Wang Xiuli (CHN)	1:25.65	
4	Kyoko Shimazaki (JPN)	1:25.90	
5	Xue Ruihong (CHN)	1:25.91	
6	Yoo Sun-hee (KOR)	1:26.11	
7	Ri Kang-ok (PRK)	1:26.30	
8	Chong Chang-suk (PRK)	1:27.01	
9	Shiho Kusunose (JPN)	1:27.29	
10	Yeon Son-yu (PRK)	1:27.56	
11	Chihaya Tanaka (JPN)	1:27.87	
12	Liu Yuexi (CHN)	1:28.67	
13	Kim Chun-wol (PRK)	1:29.48	
14	Jeong Bae-yeong (KOR)	1:32.24	
