= Speed skating at the 1992 Winter Olympics – Men's 500 metres =

Speed skating at the Olympics

Men's 500 metres at the XVI Olympic Winter Games
- Pictogram for speed skating
- Venue: L'anneau de vitesse
- Dates: 15 February 1992
- Competitors: 43 from 17 nations
- Winning time: 37.14

Medalists
1st place, gold medalist(s)		Uwe-Jens Mey; Germany
2nd place, silver medalist(s)		Toshiyuki Kuroiwa; Japan
3rd place, bronze medalist(s)		Junichi Inoue; Japan

The men's 500 metres in speed skating at the 1992 Winter Olympics took place on 15 February, at the L'anneau de vitesse.

== Records ==
Prior to this competition, the existing world and Olympic records were as follows:

World record	Dan Jansen (USA)	36.41	Davos, Switzerland	25 January 1992
Olympic record	Uwe-Jens Mey (GDR)	36.45	Calgary, Canada	14 February 1988

== Results ==
Rank	Pair	Lane	Name	Country	Time	Difference
1st place, gold medalist(s)	4	O	Uwe-Jens Mey	Germany	37.14	-
2nd place, silver medalist(s)	6	I	Toshiyuki Kuroiwa	Japan	37.18	+0.04
3rd place, bronze medalist(s)	3	I	Junichi Inoue	Japan	37.26	+0.12
4	2	O	Dan Jansen	United States	37.46	+0.32
5	4	I	Yasunori Miyabe	Japan	37.49	+0.35
5	11	O	Gerard van Velde	Netherlands	37.49	+0.35
7	1	O	Aleksandr Golubev	Unified Team	37.51	+0.37
8	5	I	Igor Zhelezovski	Unified Team	37.57	+0.43
9	16	O	Song Chen	China	37.58	+0.44
10	9	O	Kim Yoon-man	South Korea	37.60	+0.46
11	15	I	Liu Hongbo	China	37.66	+0.52
12	10	O	Jaegal Sung-yeol	South Korea	37.71	+0.57
13	1	I	Nick Thometz	United States	37.83	+0.69
14	11	I	Robert Dubreuil	Canada	37.86	+0.72
14	6	I	Vadim Shakshakbayev	Unified Team	37.86	+0.72
16	3	O	Guy Thibault	Canada	37.89	+0.75
17	12	I	Kevin Scott	Canada	38.02	+0.88
18	21	I	Yukinori Miyabe	Japan	38.12	+0.98
19	8	I	Marty Pierce	United States	38.15	+1.01
20	9	I	Björn Forslund	Sweden	38.24	+1.10
21	2	I	Sergey Klevchenya	Unified Team	38.26	+1.12
22	10	I	Dave Cruikshank	United States	38.28	+1.14
23	5	O	Peter Adeberg	Germany	38.33	+1.19
24	15	O	Li Yong-chol	North Korea	38.38	+1.24
25	18	O	Olaf Zinke	Germany	38.40	+1.26
26	14	I	Harri Ilkka	Finland	38.48	+1.34
27	17	I	Dai Jun	China	38.51	+1.37
27	13	O	Rintje Ritsma	Netherlands	38.51	+1.37
29	20	O	Arie Loef	Netherlands	38.61	+1.47
30	7	I	Sean Ireland	Canada	38.70	+1.56
31	21	O	Paweł Abratkiewicz	Poland	38.74	+1.60
31	12	O	Lee In-hun	South Korea	38.74	+1.60
33	7	O	Hans Markström	Sweden	38.89	+1.75
34	20	I	Bo König	Sweden	39.06	+1.92
35	14	O	Choi In-chol	North Korea	39.59	+2.45
36	19	I	Zsolt Baló	Romania	39.70	+2.56
37	18	I	Csaba Madarász	Hungary	40.41	+3.27
38	22	O	Joakim Karlberg	Sweden	40.71	+3.57
39	16	I	Jiří Kyncl	Czechoslovakia	40.92	+3.78
40	8	O	Roland Brunner	Austria	42.18	+5.04
41	19	O	Jiří Musil	Czechoslovakia	42.20	+5.06
42	13	I	Bajro Čenanović	Yugoslavia	43.09	+5.95
43	17	O	Slavenko Likić	Yugoslavia	43.81	+6.67
