= Speed skating at the 1992 Winter Olympics – Men's 1000 metres =

Speed skating at the Olympics

Men's 1000 metres at the XVI Olympic Winter Games
- Pictogram for speed skating
- Venue: L'anneau de vitesse
- Dates: 18 February 1992
- Competitors: 46 from 21 nations
- Winning time: 1:14.85

Medalists
1st place, gold medalist(s)		Olaf Zinke; Germany
2nd place, silver medalist(s)		Kim Yoon-man; South Korea
3rd place, bronze medalist(s)		Yukinori Miyabe; Japan

The men's 1000 metres in speed skating at the 1992 Winter Olympics took place on 18 February, at the L'anneau de vitesse.

== Records ==
Prior to this competition, the existing world and Olympic records were as follows:

World record	Pavel Pegov (URS); Igor Zhelezovski (URS)	1:12.58; 1:12.58 E	Alma Ata, Kazakh SSR, Soviet Union; Heerenveen, Netherlands	25 March 1983; 25 February 1989
Olympic record	Nikolay Gulyayev (URS)	1:13.03	Calgary, Canada	18 February 1988

== Results ==
Rank	Pair	Lane	Name	Country	Time	Time behind
1st place, gold medalist(s)	5	I	Olaf Zinke	Germany	1:14.85	-
2nd place, silver medalist(s)	9	I	Kim Yoon-man	South Korea	1:14.86	+0.01
3rd place, bronze medalist(s)	3	O	Yukinori Miyabe	Japan	1:14.92	+0.07
4	9	O	Gerard van Velde	Netherlands	1:14.93	+0.08
5	4	O	Peter Adeberg	Germany	1:15.04	+0.19
6	6	I	Igor Zhelezovski	Unified Team	1:15.05	+0.20
7	3	I	Guy Thibault	Canada	1:15.36	+0.51
8	4	I	Nikolay Gulyayev	Unified Team	1:15.46	+0.61
9	2	I	Toshiyuki Kuroiwa	Japan	1:15.56	+0.71
10	17	I	Falko Zandstra	Netherlands	1:15.57	+0.72
11	18	I	Yuji Fujimoto	Japan	1:15.78	+0.93
12	23	I	Rintje Ritsma	Netherlands	1:15.96	+1.11
13	2	O	Aleksandr Klimov	Unified Team	1:16.05	+1.20
14	18	O	Arie Loef	Netherlands	1:16.18	+1.33
15	11	I	Nick Thometz	United States	1:16.19	+1.34
16	5	O	Eric Flaim	United States	1:16.47	+1.62
16	10	I	Kevin Scott	Canada	1:16.47	+1.62
18	20	O	Choi In-Chol	North Korea	1:16.50	+1.65
19	1	O	Yasunori Miyabe	Japan	1:16.52	+1.67
20	6	O	Dave Besteman	United States	1:16.57	+1.72
21	15	I	Song Chen	China	1:16.74	+1.89
22	7	O	Roland Brunner	Austria	1:16.76	+1.91
23	7	I	Sean Ireland	Canada	1:17.03	+2.18
24	13	I	Michael Hadschieff	Austria	1:17.17	+2.32
25	1	I	Andrey Bakhvalov	Unified Team	1:17.21	+2.36
26	8	O	Dan Jansen	United States	1:17.34	+2.49
26	12	I	Jaegal Sung-yeol	South Korea	1:17.34	+2.49
28	13	O	Paweł Abratkiewicz	Poland	1:17.40	+2.55
29	10	O	Ådne Søndrål	Norway	1:17.56	+2.71
30	12	O	Liu Yanfei	China	1:17.59	+2.74
31	16	I	Björn Forslund	Sweden	1:17.71	+2.86
32	15	O	Paweł Jaroszek	Poland	1:17.82	+2.97
33	17	O	Craig McNicoll	Great Britain	1:17.95	+3.10
34	22	I	Harri Ilkka	Finland	1:17.96	+3.11
34	14	I	Danny Kah	Australia	1:17.96	+3.11
36	20	I	Zsolt Baló	Romania	1:18.12	+3.27
37	19	I	Li Yong-Chol	North Korea	1:18.17	+3.32
38	22	O	Phillip Tahmindjis	Australia	1:18.77	+3.92
39	21	I	Lee In-Hun	South Korea	1:19.08	+4.23
40	19	O	Dai Jun	China	1:19.21	+4.36
41	21	O	Csaba Madarász	Hungary	1:20.58	+5.73
42	14	O	Altangadasyn Sodnomdarjaa	Mongolia	1:21.40	+6.55
43	16	O	Slavenko Likić	Yugoslavia	1:28.57	+13.72
44	23	O	Thierry Lamberton	France	1:31.64	+16.79
45	8	I	Pat Kelly	Canada	1:36.62	+21.77
-	11	O	Bo König	Sweden	DNF	
