= Speed skating at the 1990 Asian Winter Games – Women's 1500 metres =

Women's 1500 metres at the 1990 Asian Winter Games
- Venue: Makomanai Open Stadium
- Dates: 11 March 1990
- Competitors: 13 from 4 nations

Medalists
gold medal	Seiko Hashimoto	Japan
silver medal	Wang Xiuli	China
bronze medal	Chong Chang-suk	North Korea

The women's 1500 metres at the 1990 Asian Winter Games was held on 11 March 1990 in Sapporo, Japan.

== Records ==
Prior to this competition, the existing world and Games records were as follows.

World Record	Karin Kania (GDR)	1:59.30	Alma-Ata, Soviet Union	22 March 1986
Games Record	Seiko Hashimoto (JPN)	2:10.43	Sapporo, Japan	2 March 1986

== Results ==
Rank	Athlete	Time	Notes
1st place, gold medalist(s)	Seiko Hashimoto (JPN)	2:11.23	
2nd place, silver medalist(s)	Wang Xiuli (CHN)	2:13.05	
3rd place, bronze medalist(s)	Chong Chang-suk (PRK)	2:14.22	
4	Chieko Yoda (JPN)	2:14.37	
5	Natsue Seki (JPN)	2:15.58	
6	Hong Ok-nam (PRK)	2:15.75	
7	Shiho Kusunose (JPN)	2:16.18	
8	Liu Yuexi (CHN)	2:16.19	
9	Wang Xiaoyan (CHN)	2:17.06	
10	Ri Kang-ok (PRK)	2:17.07	
11	Dong Haiyan (CHN)	2:19.10	
12	Park Jeong-eon (KOR)	2:23.09	
13	Jeong Bae-yeong (KOR)	2:24.10	
