= Speed skating at the 1990 Asian Winter Games – Men's 5000 metres =

Men's 5000 metres at the 1990 Asian Winter Games
- Venue: Makomanai Open Stadium
- Dates: 10 March 1990
- Competitors: 15 from 5 nations

Medalists
gold medal	Kazuhiro Sato	Japan
silver medal	Lü Shuhai	China
bronze medal	Oh Yong-seok	South Korea

The men's 5000 metres at the 1990 Asian Winter Games was held on 10 March 1990 in Sapporo, Japan.

== Records ==
Prior to this competition, the existing world and Games records were as follows.

World Record	Geir Karlstad (NOR)	6:43.59	Calgary, Canada	4 December 1987
Games Record	Masahito Shinohara (JPN)	7:20.83	Sapporo, Japan	2 March 1986

== Results ==
Rank	Athlete	Time	Notes
1st place, gold medalist(s)	Kazuhiro Sato (JPN)	7:16.98	GR
2nd place, silver medalist(s)	Lü Shuhai (CHN)	7:22.61	
3rd place, bronze medalist(s)	Oh Yong-seok (KOR)	7:22.66	
4	Naoki Kotake (JPN)	7:23.36	
5	Hidehiko Ichikawa (JPN)	7:25.22	
6	Toru Aoyanagi (JPN)	7:25.77	
7	Song Yong-hun (PRK)	7:27.59	
8	Lee In-hoon (KOR)	7:28.31	
9	Liu Yanfei (CHN)	7:35.68	
10	Chi Song-guk (PRK)	7:38.00	
11	Feng Qingbo (CHN)	7:42.50	
12	Shin Jong-bok (KOR)	7:45.40	
13	Altangadasyn Sodnomdarjaa (MGL)	7:46.52	
14	Mendbayaryn Chimeddorj (MGL)	7:52.53	
15	Wang Lianjun (CHN)	7:54.09	
