= Speed skating at the 1990 Asian Winter Games – Women's 3000 metres =

Women's 3000 metres at the 1990 Asian Winter Games
- Venue: Makomanai Open Stadium
- Dates: 12 March 1990
- Competitors: 12 from 4 nations

Medalists
gold medal	Seiko Hashimoto	Japan
silver medal	Natsue Seki	Japan
bronze medal	Zhang Qing	China

The women's 3000 metres at the 1990 Asian Winter Games was held on 12 March 1990 in Sapporo, Japan.

== Records ==
Prior to this competition, the existing world and Games records were as follows.

World Record	Yvonne van Gennip (NED)	4:11.94	Calgary, Canada	23 February 1988
Games Record	Keiko Asao (JPN)	4:44.98	Sapporo, Japan	4 March 1986

== Results ==
Legend

- DSQ — Disqualified

Rank	Athlete	Time	Notes
1st place, gold medalist(s)	Seiko Hashimoto (JPN)	4:39.05	GR
2nd place, silver medalist(s)	Natsue Seki (JPN)	4:43.62	
3rd place, bronze medalist(s)	Zhang Qing (CHN)	4:44.67	
4	Hiromi Yamamoto (JPN)	4:45.89	
5	Ri Kang-ok (PRK)	4:50.35	
6	Wang Xiaoyan (CHN)	4:52.28	
7	Hong Ok-nam (PRK)	4:53.61	
8	Park Jeong-eon (KOR)	4:55.82	
9	Dong Haiyan (CHN)	4:58.92	
10	Chong Chang-suk (PRK)	5:00.77	
11	Chieko Yoda (JPN)	5:04.99	
—	Wang Xiuli (CHN)	DSQ	
