= Yōko Fukazawa =

Japanese speed skater (born 1967)

Personal information
- Born: August 10, 1967 (age 58) Hokkaido, Japan

Sport
- Country: Japan
- Sport: Speed skating

Yōko Fukazawa (深澤 洋子, Fukazawa Yōko; born 10 August 1967) is a former Japanese woman speed skater. She represented Japan in the 1992 Winter Olympics and competed in the women's 500 metres and in the women's 1000 metres. She also went onto participate at the 1990 Asian Winter Games in the speed skating event.
