= Sapporo Asian Winter Games =

Sapporo Asian Winter Games may refer to three different Asian Winter Games held in Sapporo:

- 1986 Asian Winter Games
- 1990 Asian Winter Games
- 2017 Asian Winter Games
