= Kaeriyama =

Kaeriyama (written: 帰山) is a Japanese surname. Notable people with the surname include:

- Norimasa Kaeriyama (帰山 教正, 1893–1964), Japanese film director and film theorist
- Yumi Kaeriyama (帰山 由美, born 1967), Japanese speed skater
