= Björn Forslund (speed skater) =

Swedish speed skater

Personal information
- Born: 11 May 1962 (age 62); Sundsvall, Västernorrland, Sweden

Sport
- Sport: Speed skating

Björn Forslund (born 11 May 1962) is a Swedish male speed skater. He competed at the 1992 Winter Olympics and participated in the Men's 500 metres speed skating event and in the Men's 1000 metres speed skating event.
