= Krisztina Egyed =

Hungarian speed skater

Personal information
- Born: 26 August 1976 (age 49) Budapest, Hungary
- Height: 180 cm (5 ft 11 in)
- Weight: 75 kg (165 lb)

Sport
- Country: Hungary
- Sport: Speed skating

Krisztina Egyed (born 26 August 1976) is a Hungarian speed skater who competed at the 1992, 1994, 1998 and 2002 Winter Olympics representing Hungary. She specializes in the women's 500 metres, women's 1000 metres and women's 1500 metres speed skating events. She was also the flag bearer for Hungary at the 1998 and 2002 Winter Olympics.

Besides competing in the Winter Olympics, Krisztina competed in the World Sprint Speed Skating Championships and the European Speed Skating Championships numerous times.
