= Slavenko Likić =

Bosnia and Herzegovina speed skater

Personal information
- Nationality: Bosnia and Herzegovina
- Born: 25 December 1974 (age 50); Sarajevo, Yugoslavia

Sport
- Sport: Speed skating

Slavenko Likić (born 25 December 1974) is a Bosnia and Herzegovina speed skater. He competed for Yugoslavia in two events at the 1992 Winter Olympics.
