= Yuji Fujimoto (speed skater) =

Japanese speed skater (born 1970)

Personal information
- Nationality: Japanese
- Born: 7 October 1970 (age 54); Hokkaido, Japan

Sport
- Sport: Speed skating

Yuji Fujimoto (born 7 October 1970) is a Japanese speed skater. He competed in the men's 1000 metres event at the 1992 Winter Olympics.
