= Kiminobu Kimura =

Japanese alpine skier (born 1970)

Medal record

Men's alpine skiing

Representing Japan

Asian Winter Games
Gold medal – first place	1990 Sapporo	Giant slalom
Gold medal – first place	2003 Aomori	Slalom

Kiminobu Kimura (木村 公宣, Kimura Kiminobu, born 24 October 1970 in Aomori Prefecture) is a Japanese alpine skier. He competed in slalom and giant slalom at the 1992, 1994, 1998, and 2002 Winter Olympics.
