= Sean Ireland =

Canadian speed skater

Sean Ireland (born 14 November 1969) is a retired Canadian speed skater, who as of the early 2000s was a coach.

At the 1992 Olympics, he competed in the men's 500 metres and men's 1000 metres, and at the 1994 Olympics, the men's 500 metres and men's 1000 metres.

As of 2001, he was living in Winnipeg, training Canadian speedskaters including Catriona LeMay Doan, Jeremy Wotherspoon, Dustin Molicki, and Mike Ireland at the Olympic Oval in Calgary. He was born in Mississauga, Ontario.
