= Csaba Madarász =

Hungarian speed skater

Personal information
- Nationality: Hungarian
- Born: 20 April 1968 (age 56); Târgu Mureș, Romania

Sport
- Sport: Speed skating

Csaba Madarász (born 20 April 1968) is a Hungarian speed skater. He competed in three events at the 1992 Winter Olympics.
