= Atsushi Kazama =

Japanese biathlete (born 1964)

Personal information
- Nationality: Japanese
- Born: 3 March 1964 (age 61); Niigata, Japan

Sport
- Sport: Biathlon

Atsushi Kazama (born 3 March 1964) is a Japanese biathlete. He competed at the 1992 Winter Olympics and the 1998 Winter Olympics.
