= Yumi Inomata =

Japanese cross-country skier (born 1968)

Personal information
- Nationality: Japanese
- Born: 5 September 1968 (age 56); Nagano, Japan

Sport
- Sport: Cross-country skiing

Yumi Inomata (猪又 由美, Inomata Yumi; born 5 September 1968) is a Japanese cross-country skier. She competed in three events at the 1992 Winter Olympics.
