= Tsuyoshi Tomii =

Japanese alpine skier (born 1971)

Tsuyoshi Tomii (富井 剛志, Tomii Tsuyoshi; born 3 August 1971, in Nagano Prefecture) is a Japanese alpine skier. He competed at the 1992 Winter Olympics in Albertville and at the 1998 Winter Olympics in Nagano.
