= Harri Ilkka =

Finnish speed skater

Personal information
- Nationality: Finnish
- Born: 23 August 1970 (age 54); Lapua, Finland

Sport
- Sport: Speed skating

Harri Ilkka (born 23 August 1970) is a Finnish speed skater. He competed in two events at the 1992 Winter Olympics.
