= Théâtre des Cérémonies =

Former stadium at Albertville, France

Coordinates: 45.6616°N 6.3694°E

Ceremonies Theatre
- Théâtre des Cérémonies
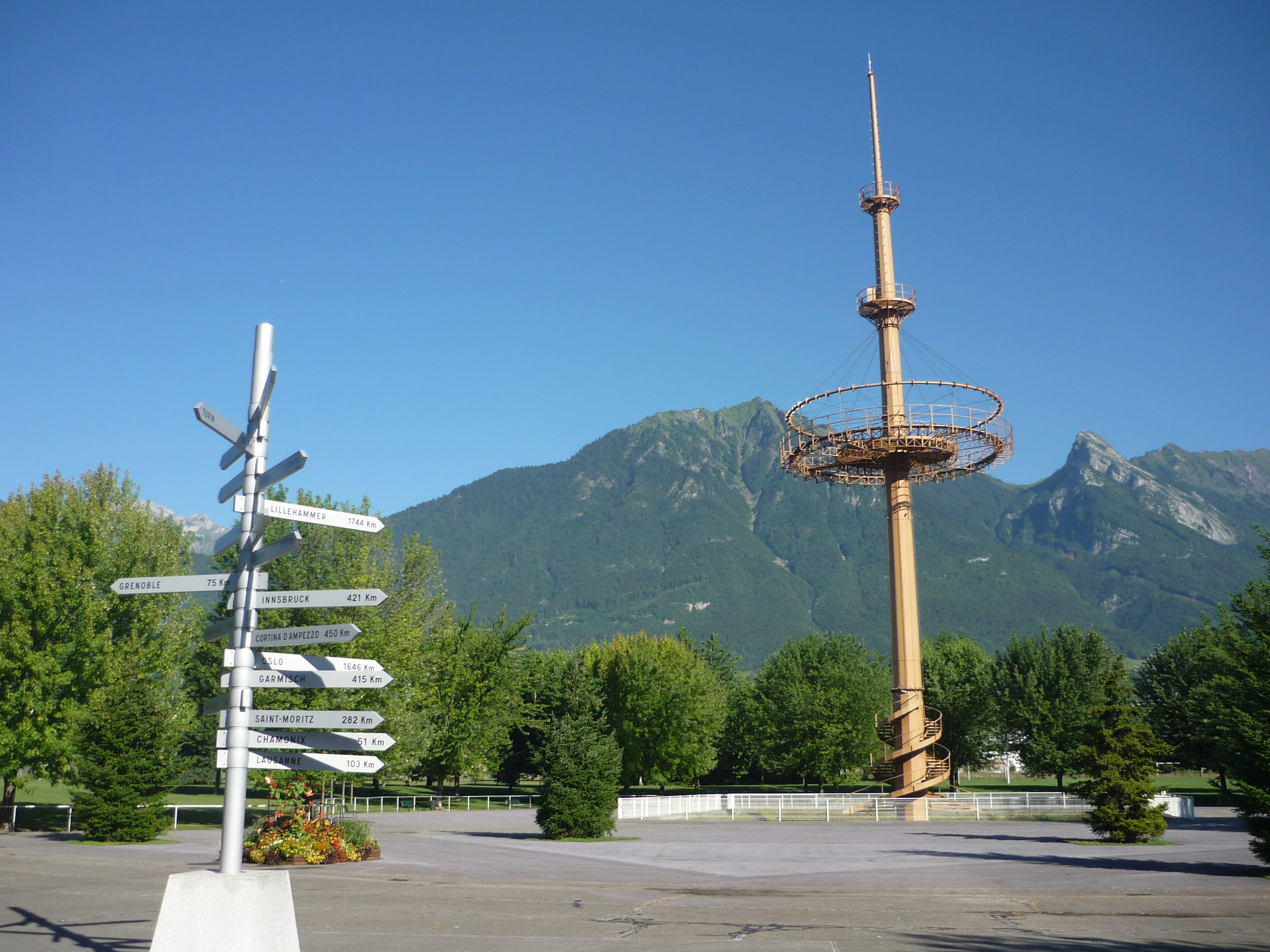
- Central spire of the former Théâtre des Cérémonies (right), pictured in 2013.
- Interactive map of Ceremonies Theatre
- Location: Albertville, France
- Capacity: 35,000
- Surface: Ice and Asphalt

Construction
- Built: 5 August 1989; 37 years ago
- Opened: 29 December 1991; 34 years ago
- Demolished: 24 February 1992; 34 years ago

Théâtre des Cérémonies was a temporary stadium in Albertville, France. Built to only host the opening and closing ceremonies for the 1992 Winter Olympics, the circular shape stadium was immediately disassembled following the games. The stadium held 35,000 and was built as a circus sphere. Part of the stadium was shipped to Barcelona and used during the 1992 Summer Olympics. During its existence, it was the largest such temporary structure ever built. The site is now a public and open park.

== See also ==
- Pyeongchang Olympic Stadium, a similar temporary facility for the 2018 Winter Olympics.
