= Osamu Yamazaki =

Japanese freestyle skier (born 1964)

Personal information
- Nationality: Japanese
- Born: 25 December 1964 (age 60); Takikawa, Japan

Sport
- Sport: Freestyle skiing

Osamu Yamazaki (山崎 修, Yamazaki Osamu, born 25 December 1964) is a Japanese freestyle skier. He competed in the men's moguls event at the 1992 Winter Olympics.
