= Yumi Kaeriyama =

Japanese speed skater (born 1967)

Personal information
- Nationality: Japanese
- Born: 31 May 1967 (age 59) Hokkaido, Japan

Sport
- Sport: Speed skating

Yumi Kaeriyama (帰山 由美, Kaeriyama Yumi; born 31 May 1967) is a Japanese speed skater. She competed in three events at the 1992 Winter Olympics.
