= Jiro Kamiharako =

Japanese ski jumper

Personal information
- Born: March 19, 1966 (age 60) Sapporo, Japan

Sport
- Sport: Skiing

World Cup career
- Seasons: 1991–1992
- Indiv. podiums: 0
- Indiv. wins: 0

Jiro Kamiharako (上原子 次郎, Kamiharako Jirō; born March 19, 1966) is a Japanese former ski jumper.

In the World Cup his highest place was number 16 from December 1991 in Sapporo.

He participated in the 1992 Winter Olympics in Albertville, where he finished 28th in the normal hill, 25th in the large hill and 4th in the team event.
