= Tokyo Organising Committee of the Olympic and Paralympic Games =

Committee for 2020 Olympic and Paralympic Games

- Type: Company limited by guarantee
- Headquarters: Tokyo
- President: Seiko Hashimoto
- Website: tokyo2020.org/en/

The Tokyo Organising Committee of the Olympic and Paralympic Games (公益財団法人東京オリンピック・パラリンピック競技大会組織委員会, Koueki Zaidanhōjin Tōkyō Orinpikku Pararinpikku Kyōgitaikai Soshiki Iinkai) (TOCOG) was the organisation responsible for overseeing the planning and development of the 2020 Summer Olympic and Paralympic Games.

== History ==
The Organising Committee was launched on 24 January 2014, and is composed of members of the Japanese Olympic Committee, the Japanese Paralympic Committee, the Tokyo Metropolitan Government, the Japanese government, as well as members of various other organisations and individuals from various fields. It was spearheaded by former Prime Minister Yoshirō Mori until his resignation in 2021, with Toshirō Mutō as Director General (CEO) and former Prime Minister Shinzō Abe as its Supreme Advisor.

Mori offered his resignation as head of the committee on 12 February 2021 following remarks he made during a meeting the previous week that were regarded as sexist. On 18 February, seven-time Olympian and LDP lawmaker Seiko Hashimoto was introduced as the committee's new president. Hashimoto is the first woman to head the TOCOG and second woman to lead the Olympic Committee after Athens 2004 Olympic Committee chairperson Gianna Angelopoulos-Daskalaki.

Prior to assuming the post of committee president, Hashimoto served on the Japanese Cabinet as Minister of State for the Tokyo Olympic and Paralympic Games. LDP lawmaker Tamayo Marukawa was selected to succeed Hashimoto in the Cabinet role.

The committee dissolved in June 2022.

== Post-Games investigations ==
After the committee dissolved, Japanese prosecutors continued investigations into contracts connected to the Tokyo 2020 Games. In 2023, former TOCOG official Yasuo Mori and several company executives were arrested in an investigation into suspected bid-rigging involving contracts for Olympic test events and the Games. Prosecutors later indicted six companies, including Dentsu, and seven individuals over the suspected rigging of bids worth approximately US$320 million.

A separate bribery case centered on Haruyuki Takahashi, a former TOCOG board member and former Dentsu executive, who was charged with accepting payments in connection with Olympic contracts. Takahashi pleaded not guilty, stating that the payments were legitimate business transactions.

== See also ==
- Concerns and controversies at the 2020 Summer Olympics about TOCOG bribery and corruption concerns
