= Susan Massitti =

Canadian speed skater

Personal information
- Nationality: Canadian
- Born: 14 December 1963 (age 62) or February 1962 (age 63–64) Vermilion, Alberta, Canada

Sport
- Sport: Speed skating

Susan Massitti-Stewart (born 14 December 1963 or February 1962) is a Canadian speed skater. She competed in the women's 3000 metres at the 1998 Winter Olympics. She participated at the World Allround Speed Skating Championships for Women in 1991, finishing 30th overall.

== Records ==
=== Personal records ===
Personal records
Women's speed skating
Event	Result	Date	Location	Notes
500 m	41,21	22.01.1998	Calgary	
1000 m	1.21,54	08.11.1997	Calgary	
1500 m	2.02,56	07.01.1998	Calgary	
3000 m	4.19,83	15.11.1997	Calgary	
5000 m	7.38,96	03.03.1996	Calgary	
