= Kenji Suda =

Japanese ski jumper

Personal information
- Born: 26 February 1966 (age 60)

Sport
- Sport: Skiing

World Cup career
- Seasons: 1990-1992; 1994-1998
- Indiv. podiums: 1
- Indiv. wins: 0

Kenji Suda (須田 健仁, Suda Kenji) (born 26 February 1966) is a Japanese former ski jumper.

In the World Cup, he finished twelve times among the top 10, his best result being a second place from Örnsköldsvik in March 1994.

He participated in the 1992 Winter Olympics in Albertville, where he finished 39th in the normal hill, 17th in the large hill and 4th in the team event.
