= Song Chen (speed skater) =

Chinese speed skater

Personal information
- Nationality: Chinese
- Born: 3 June 1967 (age 57)

Sport
- Sport: Speed skating

Song Chen (born 3 June 1967) is a Chinese speed skater. He competed in two events at the 1992 Winter Olympics.
