= Kazuhiko Takamatsu =

Japanese luger (born 1964)

Personal information
- Nationality: Japanese
- Born: 11 August 1964 (age 62) Hokkaido, Japan

Sport
- Sport: Luge

Kazuhiko Takamatsu (born 11 August 1964) is a Japanese luger. He competed at the 1988 Winter Olympics, the 1992 Winter Olympics and the 1994 Winter Olympics.
