= Takuya Ishioka =

Japanese alpine skier (born 1971)

Takuya Ishioka (石岡 拓也, Ishioka Takuya, born 16 December 1971 in Aomori Prefecture) is a Japanese alpine skier. He competed at the 1992, 1994, and 1998 Winter Olympics.
