= Takashi Ohori =

Japanese bobsledder (born 1969)

Personal information
- Nationality: Japanese
- Born: 13 November 1969 (age 55); Watari, Japan

Sport
- Sport: Bobsleigh

Takashi Ohori (大堀 孝, Ōhori Takashi, born 13 November 1969) is a Japanese bobsledder. He competed at the 1994 Winter Olympics and the 1998 Winter Olympics.
