= Peggy Clasen =

American speed skater

Personal information
- Full name: Peggy Ann Clasen
- Nationality: American
- Born: April 7, 1969 (age 57) Saint Paul, Minnesota, United States

Sport
- Country: United States
- Sport: Speed skating

Peggy Ann Clasen (born 7 April 1969) is a former American female speed skater. She was primarily a sprint speed skater, and competed at the World Sprint speed skating Championships from 1990 to 1993.

Peggy also competed at the 1992 Winter Olympics and 1994 Winter Olympics representing the United States.
