= Yuji Sasaki =

Japanese luger (born 1972)

Personal information
- Nationality: Japanese
- Born: 31 January 1972 (age 53); Hokkaido, Japan

Sport
- Sport: Luge

Yuji Sasaki (Japanese: ゆうじ 佐々木) (born 31 January 1972) is a Japanese luger. He competed at the 1992 Winter Olympics and the 1994 Winter Olympics.
