= Reiichi Mikata =

Japanese Nordic combined skier

Reiichi Mikata 河野 孝典
Personal information
- Nationality: Japan
- Born: 7 March 1969 (age 57) Ashiro, Iwate, Japan (now Hachimantai)

Sport
- Sport: Skiing
Medal record
Men's Nordic combined
Representing Japan
Olympic Games
Gold medal – first place	1992 Albertville	3 x 10 km team
World Championships
Bronze medal – third place	1991 Val di Fiemme	3 x 10 km team

Reiichi Mikata (三ヶ田 礼一, Mikata Reiichi) (born January 14, 1967) is a Japanese Nordic combined skier who competed during the early 1990s. He won the 3 x 10 km team event at the 1992 Winter Olympics in Albertville.

== Early life ==
Mikata was born in Ashiro, Iwate. He started skiing at the age of three, and joined a ski sports youth club as a fourth year elementary school student. As a fifth grade student he met ski jumping gold medalist Yukio Kasaya, who encouraged him to take the sport seriously.

For his three years at junior high school, Mikata played for his school's baseball club in the summer, and represented his school's ski club in the winter. In his second year of junior high school, he won second place in the Iwate Prefectural Nordic Jumping Championships.

For high school, Mikata chose to attend Toō Gijuku High School, a school with a long history of producing Olympic athletes. While there, Mikata won the Japanese national Inter High School Championships in Ski jumping.

Mikata attended Tokyo's Meiji University, graduating from the Department of Business Affairs. After his graduation in 1989 he went to work at Recruit Holdings Co., Ltd.

== Winter sports career ==
=== Domestic career ===
In March 1990, Mikata won the Sapporo Miyasama International Tournament. The next year, he was selected as one of the five members of the Nordic Combined All Japan A Team, and was then selected to go to the Olympics along with three teammates.

=== Olympic career ===
Mikata represented Japan at the 1992 Winter Olympics, held in Albertville, France. He competed in both the individual and team men's Nordic combined events. In the individual event, he was placed second after the first day's jumping section, but did poorly on the cross country section on the second day, and finished in 34th place overall.

In the team event, competing alongside his teammates Takanori Kono and Kenji Ogiwari, Mikata once again jumped well, and the Japanese team led by 2 minutes and 30 seconds over Austria going into the second day's skiing stage. Despite a strong finish by the Norwegian team, Japan held on to win gold.

=== World Championships ===
Mikata also won a bronze medal in the 3 x 10 km team event at the 1991 FIS Nordic World Ski Championships in Val di Fiemme, competing with his teammates Masashi Abe and Kazuoki Kondama.

== Post sports career ==
After retiring from winter sports, Mikita worked as the chief of the Sports Promotion Division of Iwate Prefecture's Culture and Sports Department.
