= Atsushi Sasaki =

Japanese luger (born 1971)

Personal information
- Nationality: Japanese
- Born: 7 September 1971 (age 53); Sapporo, Japan

Sport
- Sport: Luge

Atsushi Sasaki (born 7 September 1971) is a Japanese luger. He competed at the 1992 Winter Olympics, the 1994 Winter Olympics and the 1998 Winter Olympics.
