= Naomi Takewaki =

Japanese bobsledder (born 1964)

Personal information
- Nationality: Japanese
- Born: 18 May 1964 (age 60); Takashima District, Japan

Sport
- Sport: Bobsleigh

Naomi Takewaki (竹脇 直巳, Takewaki Naomi, born 18 May 1964) is a Japanese bobsledder. He competed at the 1988, 1992, 1994 and the 1998 Winter Olympics.
