= Jun Uematsu =

Japanese speed skater (born 1972)

Personal information
- Nationality: Japanese
- Born: 23 April 1972 (age 52); Gifu, Japan

Sport
- Sport: Short track speed skating

Jun Uematsu (植松 純, Uematsu Jun, born 23 April 1972) is a Japanese short track speed skater. He competed in three events at the 1994 Winter Olympics.
