= Sandra Voetelink =

Dutch speed skater

Personal information
- Nationality: Netherlands
- Born: 7 August 1970 (age 55) Heerhugowaard, the Netherlands
- Height: 1.76 m (5 ft 9 in)
- Weight: 61 kg (134 lb)
- Spouse: Leo Visser

Sport
- Sport: Speed skating
- Club: Alkmaarsche IJsclub

Sandra Voetelink (born 7 August 1970) is a retired speed skater from the Netherlands who was active between 1988 and 1994. In 1992, she won a national title in the 1500 m and finished second in the 500 m and 1000 m. She competed in these three events at the 1992 Winter Olympics with the best achievement of 16th place in the 1000 m.

She married Leo Visser, also an Olympic speed skater.

Sandra was also briefly known in the UK as Kisha (The Starburst) in ITV's action/entertainment television show Ice Warriors (game show) in 1998. The series only lasted for one season but pitted various ice teams across the UK against Kisha and the rest of the Ice Warriors.

Personal bests:

- 500 m – 41.00 (1992)
- 1000 – 1:22.85 (1992)
- 1500 – 2:07.04 (1991)
- 3000 – 4:29.23 (1990)
- 5000 – 7:54.42 (1992)
