= Natsue Seki =

Japanese speed skater

Personal information
- Born: 10 June 1966 (age 60) Mukawa, Hokkaido, Japan

Sport
- Country: Japan
- Sport: Speed skating, cycling
Medal record
Women's speed skating
Representing Japan
Asian Winter Games
Silver medal – second place	1986 Sapporo	3000 m
Silver medal – second place	1990 Sapporo	3000 m

Natsue Seki (関 ナツエ, Seki Natsue; born 10 June 1966) is a Japanese former athlete. She competed in the cycling at the 1988 Summer Olympics and the speed skating at the 1988 Winter Olympics.
