= Yoshiko Honda-Mikami =

Japanese biathlete (born 1966)

Personal information
- Nationality: Japanese
- Born: 23 May 1966 (age 58)

Sport
- Sport: Biathlon

Yoshiko Honda-Mikami (born 23 May 1966) is a Japanese biathlete. She competed at the 1992 Winter Olympics and the 1994 Winter Olympics.
