= Olaf Zinke =

German speed skater

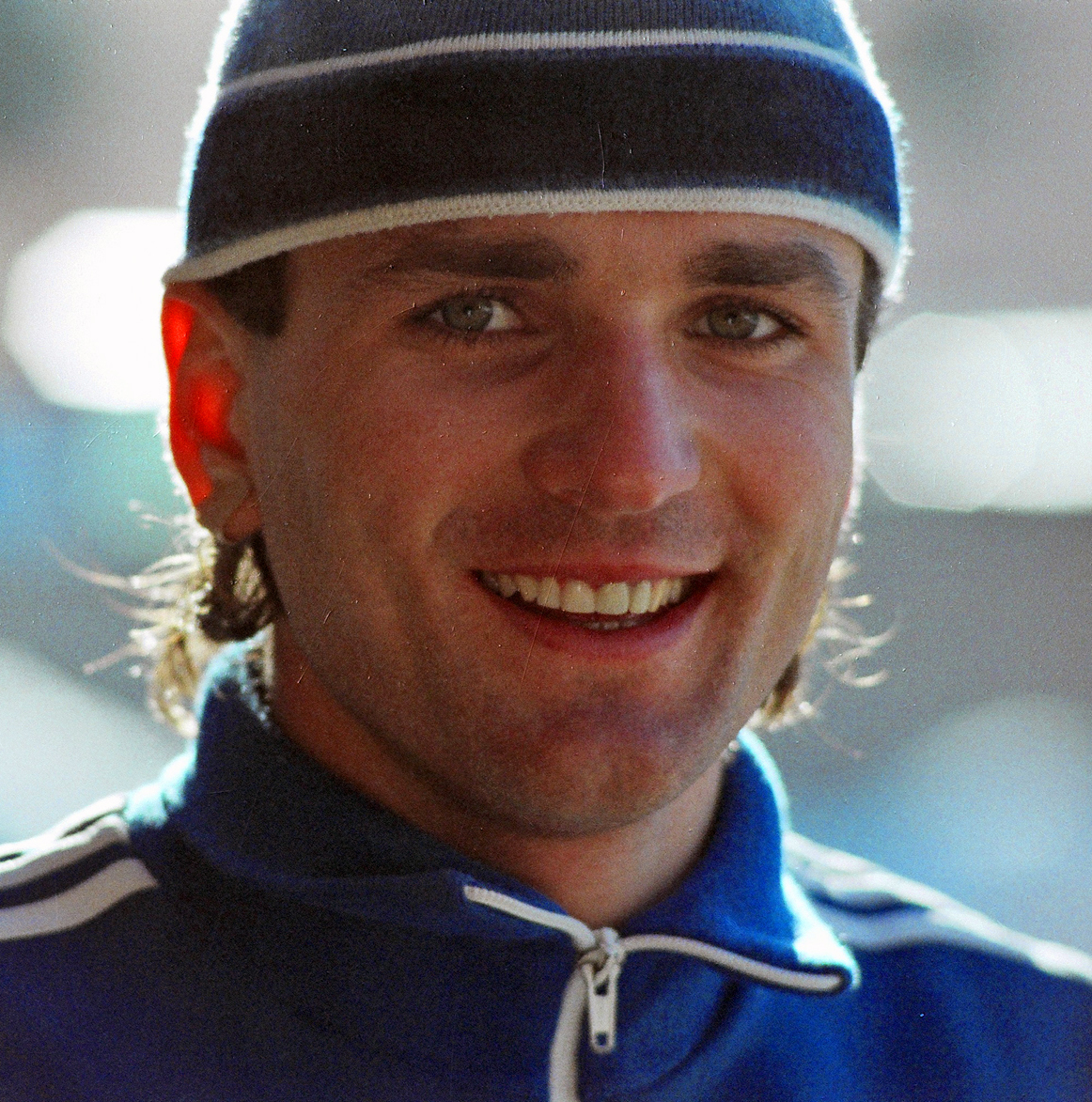
- Zinke in 2010

Personal information
- Nationality: German
- Born: 9 October 1966 (age 59) Bad Muskau, East Germany
- Height: 182 cm (6 ft 0 in)
- Weight: 80 kg (176 lb)

Sport
- Country: East Germany; Germany
- Sport: Speed skating
- Club: SC Dynamo Berlin
- Turned pro: 1983
- Retired: 1994

Achievements and titles
- Personal best(s): 500 m: 37.74 (1990); 1000 m: 1:14.53 (1990); 1500 m: 1:53.64 (1993); 3000 m: 4:06.71 (1992); 5000 m: 7:04.23 (1988); 10 000 m: 15:00.6 (1988)
Medal record
Men's speed skating
Representing Germany
Olympic games
Gold medal – first place	1992 Albertville	1000 m

Olaf Zinke (born 9 October 1966) is a former speed skater.

Zinke specialised in the 1,000 metres and 1,500 metres distances. In 1990, at a World Cup race in Helsinki he proved his skill at top level for the first time, finishing first in the 1,500 metres leaving Johann Olav Koss and Michael Hadschieff behind him, and the next day he won the 1,000 metres by outpacing Dan Jansen and Eric Flaim. He peaked again at the 1992 Winter Olympics in Albertville. Leaving the South Korean Kim Yoon-man behind by 0.01 seconds, Zinke won the 1,000 metres race and thereby the Olympic gold medal.

== Personal records ==
Distance	Result	Date	Location
500 m	37.74	10 March 1990	Heerenveen
1,000 m	1:14.53	11 March 1990	Heerenveen
1,500 m	1:53.64	5 December 1993	Hamar
3,000 m	4:06.71	18 January 1992	Davos
5,000 m	7:04.23	25 March 1988	Medeo
10,000 m	15:00.6	26 March 1988	Medeo
Big combination	165.219	26 March 1988	Medeo
Small combination	165.248	25 March 1988	Medeo
Sprint combination	151.880	17 March 1990	Inzell

Zinke has an Adelskalender score of 163.073 points.
