= Misao Kodate =

Japanese biathlete (born 1961)

Personal information
- Nationality: Japanese
- Born: 16 November 1961 (age 64) Iwate, Japan

Sport
- Sport: Biathlon

Misao Kodate (小舘 操, Kodate Misao; born 16 November 1961) is a Japanese biathlete. He competed at the 1988 Winter Olympics, the 1992 Winter Olympics and the 1994 Winter Olympics.
