= Kazutoshi Nagahama =

Japanese cross-country skier (born 1969)

Kazutoshi Nagahama (長浜 一年, Nagahama Kazutoshi, born April 29, 1969) was a Japanese cross-country skier who competed from 1993 to 1998. Competing in two Winter Olympics, he earned his best career and individual finishes at Nagano in 1998 with a seventh in the 4 x 10 km relay and 33rd in the 50 km event, respectively.

Nagahama's best finish at the FIS Nordic World Ski Championships was 33rd in the 10 km + 15 km combined pursuit at Thunder Bay, Ontario in 1995. His best World Cup finish was 31st twice at various distances in 1995.

Nagahama's best individual career finish was fourth in a 30 km FIS Race event in Finland in 1996.
