= Toshio Wakita =

Japanese bobsledder (born 1965)

Personal information
- Nationality: Japanese
- Born: 19 February 1965 (age 60); Kamitonda, Japan

Sport
- Sport: Bobsleigh

Toshio Wakita (脇田 寿雄, Wakita Toshio, born 19 February 1965) is a Japanese bobsledder. He competed at the 1988, 1992, 1994 and the 1998 Winter Olympics.
