= Toru Aoyanagi =

Japanese speed skater (born 1968)

Medal record

Men's speed skating

Representing Japan

Asian Games
Silver medal – second place	1990 Sapporo	1500 m
Bronze medal – third place	1990 Sapporo	10000 m

Toru Aoyanagi (青柳 徹, Aoyanagi Tōru, born 12 April 1968 in Kushiro, Hokkaidō) is a former speed skater from Japan, who represented his native country in four consecutive Winter Olympics, starting in 1988 in Calgary, Alberta, Canada.
