= Hiromi Yamamoto =

Japanese speed skater (born 1970)

Olympic medal record

Women's speed skating

Representing Japan

Olympic Games
Bronze medal – third place	1994 Lillehammer	5000 m

Hiromi Yamamoto (later Yamanaka, 山本 宏美 later 山中, Yamamoto Hiromi, later Yamanaka, born 21 April 1970) is a Japanese speed skater who competed in the 1994 Winter Olympics.

She was born in Shiraoi, Hokkaido and is the wife of Takeshi Yamanaka.

In 1994 she won the bronze medal in the 5000 metres event. In the 3000 metres competition she finished seventh and in the 1500 metres contest she finished 15th.
