= Ye Qiaobo =

Chinese speed skater

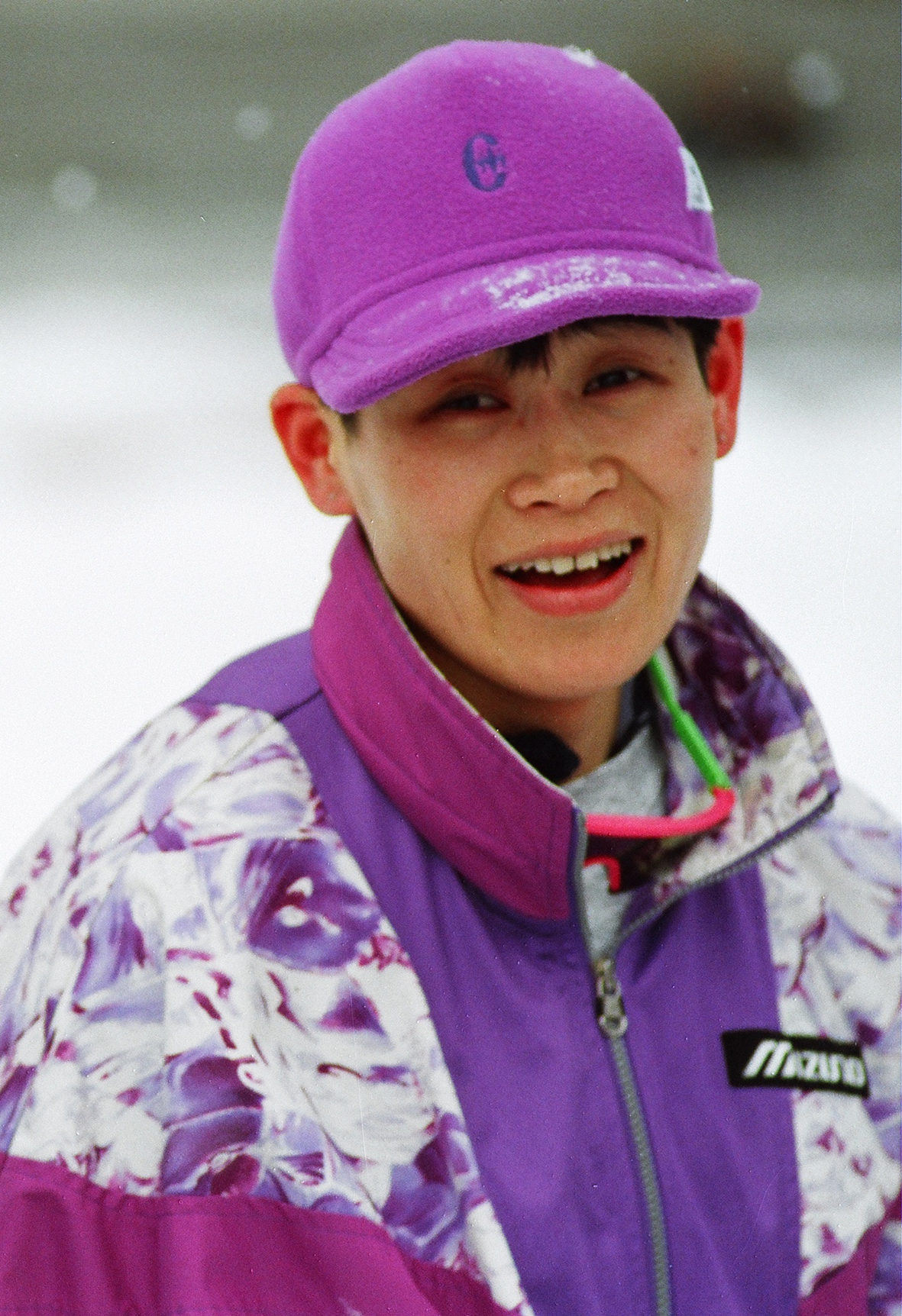
- Ye in an unknown date

Personal information
- Born: June 3, 1964 (age 62) Changchun, Jilin

Sport
- Country: China
- Sport: Speed skating
Medal record
Olympic Games
Silver medal – second place	1992 Albertville	500 m
Silver medal – second place	1992 Albertville	1000 m
Bronze medal – third place	1994 Lillehammer	1000 m
Asian Winter Games
Silver medal – second place	1990 Sapporo	1000 m
Bronze medal – third place	1986 Sapporo	500 m
Bronze medal – third place	1986 Sapporo	1500 m

Ye Qiaobo
- Traditional Chinese: 葉喬波
- Simplified Chinese: 叶乔波
Transcriptions
Standard Mandarin
- Hanyu Pinyin: Yè Qiáobō
- Wade–Giles: Yeh Ch'iao-po
- IPA: [jê tɕʰjǎʊpwó]

Ye Qiaobo (born June 3, 1964) is a Chinese speed skater. She was born in Changchun, Jilin. She competed in the 1992 Winter Olympics and in the 1994 Winter Olympics.

In the 1988 Winter Olympics in Calgary, Ye tested positive for steroids and was banned from international competition for 15 months. She maintained that she had followed the instructions of the team physician, but was nonetheless reviled in the Chinese press for bringing disgrace to her country and family. Officials later admitted that the team physician bore responsibility.

In 1992, she competed against U.S. speed skater Bonnie Blair and won the silver medal in the 500 metres event with a time of 40.51. She also won a silver medal in the 1000 metres competition. Her silver in the 500m was the first medal for a Chinese athlete at the Winter Olympics. Two years later she won the bronze medal in the 1000 metres contest and finished 13th in the 500 metres event. She was the winner for World Sprint Speed Skating Championships for Women in 1992 and 1993.
