= Liu Yuexi =

Chinese speed skater

Personal information
- Nationality: Chinese
- Born: 10 November 1968 (age 56); Heilongjiang, China

Sport
- Sport: Speed skating

Liu Yuexi (born 10 November 1968) is a Chinese speed skater. She competed in two events at the 1992 Winter Olympics.
