= Yukinori Miyabe =

Japanese speed skater (1968–2017)

Personal information
- Nationality: Japanese
- Born: 18 July 1968 Tokyo, Japan
- Died: 7 March 2017 (aged 48) Tokyo

Sport
- Country: Japan
- Sport: Speed skating
- Retired: 2000

Achievements and titles
- Personal best(s): 500 m: 35.49 (1999); 1000 m: 1:10.28 (1999); 1500 m: 1:49.67 (1998); 3000 m: 4:31.39 (1990); 5000 m: 6:56.28 (1999)
Medal record
Representing Japan
Event	1st	2nd	3rd
Olympic Games	0	0	1
Total	0	0	1
Men's Speed Skating
Olympic Games
Bronze medal – third place	1992 Albertville	1000 m

Yukinori Miyabe (宮部 行範, Miyabe Yukinori; 18 July 1968 – 7 March 2017) was a Japanese speed skater who competed in the 1992 Winter Olympics and the 1994 Winter Olympics.

== Speedskating career ==
Born in Katsushika, Tokyo, Miyabe moved to Kushiro when he was 5 years old, and started speedskating. He then moved to Saitama prefecture in the first year of Junior High school and joined Sankyo Seiki.

At the 1992 Winter Olympics, he won the bronze medal in the 1000 metres event. In the 1500 m competition he finished ninth and in the 500 m contest he finished 18th.

Two years later he finished 14th in the 1000 metres event and 21st in the 1500 metres competition.

He ended up winning the overall classification of the ISU Speed Skating World Cup 1000 m in the 1994/1995 season.

== Retirement ==
After retiring from the 1999/2000 season, he retired at Ohio State University postgraduate school by JOC's overseas dispatch business and majored in sports management. In 2005 he returned to JOC staff.

== Personal life ==
He was the younger brother of Yasunori Miyabe. Yukinori died of cancer in March 2017.
