= Kim Chun-wol =

North Korean speed skater (born 1974)

Personal information
- Nationality: North Korean
- Born: 24 August 1974 (age 51)

Sport
- Sport: Speed skating

Kim Chun-wol (born 24 August 1974) is a North Korean speed skater. She competed in three events at the 1992 Winter Olympics.
