= Junichi Inoue =

Japanese speed skater (born 1971)

Personal information
- Born: 26 December 1971 (age 54) Arakawa, Saitama, Japan

Sport
- Sport: Speed skating
Medal record
Men's speed skating
Representing Japan
Olympic Games
Bronze medal – third place	1992 Albertville	500 m
World Sprint Championships
Bronze medal – third place	1994 Calgary	Sprint

Junichi Inoue (井上純一, Inoue Junichi; born 26 December 1971) is a Japanese speed skater who competed in the 1992 and 1994 Winter Olympics. He was born in Arakawa, Saitama.

In 1992 he won the bronze medal in the 500 metres event. Two years later he finished sixth in the 500 metres competition and eighth in the 1000 metres contest.
