= Noriko Toda =

Japanese speed skater (born 1965)

Personal information
- Born: June 3, 1965 (age 59); Hokkaido, Japan

Sport
- Country: Japan
- Sport: Speed skating

Noriko Toda (戸田 則子, Toda Noriko, born 3 June 1965) is a former Japanese female speed skater. She competed at the 1988 Winter Olympics and in the 1992 Winter Olympics representing Japan.
