= Shiho Kusunose =

Japanese speed skater (born 1969)

Personal information
- Nationality: Japanese
- Born: 23 October 1969 (age 55); Bekkai, Hokkaido, Japan

Sport
- Sport: Speed skating

Shiho Kusunose (楠瀬 志保, Kusunose Shiho, born 23 October 1969) is a Japanese speed skater. She competed at the 1994 Winter Olympics and the 1998 Winter Olympics.
