= Toshiyuki Kuroiwa =

Japanese speed skater (born 1969)

Personal information
- Born: 27 February 1969 (age 57) Tsumagoi, Gunma, Japan

Sport
- Country: Japan
- Sport: Speed skating
Medal record
Men's speed skating
Representing Japan
Olympic Games
Silver medal – second place	1992 Albertville	500 metres
World Sprint Championships
Bronze medal – third place	1991 Inzell	Sprint
Bronze medal – third place	1992 Oslo	Sprint

Toshiyuki Kuroiwa (黒岩敏幸, Kuroiwa Toshiyuki; born 27 February 1969 in Tsumagoi, Gunma, Japan) is a former speed skater from Japan, who represented his native country in three consecutive Winter Olympics in 1992, 1994 and 1998. At Albertville, France, in 1992, he won the silver medal in the men's 500 metres.
