= Yoo Sun-hee =

South Korean speed skater

Yoo Seon-Hee
Personal information
- Born: May 20, 1967 (age 59) Yanggu, South Korea

Sport
- Country: South Korea
- Sport: Women's speed skating
- College team: Korea National Sport University
- Retired: 1995

Achievements and titles
- Personal bests: 500 m: 39.46; 1000 m: 1:19.71; 1500 m: 2:07.50; 3000 m: 4:53.47; 5000 m: 9:14.04
Medal record
Women's speed skating
Representing South Korea
Winter Universiade
Gold medal – first place	1991 Sapporo	500 m
Silver medal – second place	1991 Sapporo	1000 m
Asian Winter Games
Bronze medal – third place	1990 Sapporo	500 m

Yoo Seon-Hee (Korean: 유선희; Hanja: 劉仙姫, born 20 May 1967) is a retired South Korean female speed skater. She represented her country at the 1988, 1992 and 1994 Winter Olympics. At the 1994 games, she was a favourite leading up to the competition and had set the track record at the venue, but finished only fifth.
