= Yasunori Miyabe =

Japanese speed skater (born 1966)

Personal information
- Born: 5 November 1966 (age 59) Tokyo, Japan

Sport
- Country: Japan
- Sport: Speed skating
Medal record
Men's speed skating
World Sprint Championships
Silver medal – second place	1993 Ikaho	Sprint
Bronze medal – third place	1995 Milwaukee	Sprint
Asian Games
Bronze medal – third place	1990 Sapporo	500 m

Yasunori Miyabe (宮部 保範, Miyabe Yasunori; born 5 November 1966 in Tokyo, Japan) is a speed skater, and he is the older brother of late speed skater Yukinori Miyabe.

== World records ==
Event	Time	Date	Venue
1000 m	1:12.37	26 March 1994	Olympic Oval, Calgary
Sprint combination	144.445	26 March 1994	Olympic Oval, Calgary

Source: SpeedSkatingStats.com
