= Jeong Bae-yeong =

South Korean speed skater

Personal information
- Nationality: South Korean
- Born: 15 April 1976 (age 48); Gangwon, South Korea

Sport
- Sport: Speed skating

Jeong Bae-yeong (born 15 April 1976) is a South Korean speed skater. She competed in two events at the 1994 Winter Olympics.
