= Kazuhiro Sato (speed skater) =

Japanese speed skater (born 1967)

Personal information
- Nationality: Japanese
- Born: 6 April 1967 (age 59) Hokkaido, Japan

Sport
- Sport: Speed skating

Kazuhiro Sato (佐藤 和弘, Satō Kazuhiro; born 6 April 1967) is a Japanese speed skater. He competed at the 1992 Winter Olympics and the 1994 Winter Olympics.
