= Speed skating at the 1992 Winter Olympics =

Speed skating at the XVI Olympic Winter Games
- Pictogram for speed skating
- Venue: L'anneau de vitesse
- Dates: 9–20 February 1992
- No. of events: 10
- Competitors: 154 from 23 nations

Speed skating at the 1992 Winter Olympics, was held from 9 to 20 February. Ten events were contested at L'anneau de vitesse. It was the last time in Winter Olympics in which speed skating events were contested in an outdoor ice rink.

== Medal summary ==
=== Medal table ===
| Rank | Nation | Gold | Silver | Bronze | Total |
|---|---|---|---|---|---|
| 1 | Germany | 5 | 3 | 3 | 11 |
| 2 | Norway | 2 | 2 | 1 | 5 |
| 3 | United States | 2 | 0 | 0 | 2 |
| 4 | Netherlands | 1 | 1 | 2 | 4 |
| 5 | China | 0 | 2 | 0 | 2 |
| 6 | Japan | 0 | 1 | 3 | 4 |
| 7 | South Korea | 0 | 1 | 0 | 1 |
| 8 | Austria | 0 | 0 | 1 | 1 |
| Totals (8 entries) | | 10 | 10 | 10 | 30 |

Germany, in its first Olympics since reunification, topped the medal table with five gold medals, and eleven total medals. All the medals were won by athletes from the former East Germany. Germany's Gunda Niemann led the individual medal table with two golds and a silver, and Norway's Johan Olav Koss was the most successful male skater, with one gold and one silver.

South Korea's Kim Yoon-Man and China's Ye Qiaobo became the first ever medalists for their countries at the Winter Olympics. Bonnie Blair collected two gold medals to become the second most successful female speed skater of the games.

=== Men's events ===
| Event | Gold | | Silver | | Bronze | |
|---|---|---|---|---|---|---|
| 500 metres | Uwe-Jens Mey; Germany | 37.14 | Toshiyuki Kuroiwa; Japan | 37.18 | Junichi Inoue; Japan | 37.26 |
| 1000 metres | Olaf Zinke; Germany | 1:14.85 | Kim Yoon-man; South Korea | 1:14.86 | Yukinori Miyabe; Japan | 1:14.92 |
| 1500 metres | Johann Olav Koss; Norway | 1:54.81 | Ådne Søndrål; Norway | 1:54.85 | Leo Visser; Netherlands | 1:54.90 |
| 5000 metres | Geir Karlstad; Norway | 6:59.97 | Falko Zandstra; Netherlands | 7:02.28 | Leo Visser; Netherlands | 7:04.96 |
| 10,000 metres | Bart Veldkamp; Netherlands | 14:12.12 | Johann Olav Koss; Norway | 14:14.58 | Geir Karlstad; Norway | 14:18.13 |

=== Women's events ===
| Event | Gold | | Silver | | Bronze | |
|---|---|---|---|---|---|---|
| 500 metres | Bonnie Blair; United States | 40.33 | Ye Qiaobo; China | 40.51 | Christa Luding; Germany | 40.57 |
| 1000 metres | Bonnie Blair; United States | 1:21.90 | Ye Qiaobo; China | 1:21.92 | Monique Garbrecht; Germany | 1:22.10 |
| 1500 metres | Jacqueline Börner; Germany | 2:05.87 | Gunda Niemann; Germany | 2:05.92 | Seiko Hashimoto; Japan | 2:06.88 |
| 3000 metres | Gunda Niemann; Germany | 4:19.90 | Heike Warnicke; Germany | 4:22.88 | Emese Hunyady; Austria | 4:24.64 |
| 5000 metres | Gunda Niemann; Germany | 7:31.57 | Heike Warnicke; Germany | 7:37.59 | Claudia Pechstein; Germany | 7:39.80 |

== Records ==
There were no Olympic or World records set at the 1992 Games, as the outdoor rink in Albertville (as of today the last speed skating outdoor rink in Winter Games history) was not conducive to fast times.

== Participating NOCs ==
Twenty-three nations competed in the speed skating events at Albertville. The Unified Team was in essence a Soviet team under a different name as the USSR collapsed several months prior to the Games' start.

- Australia (2)
- Austria (3)
- Canada (9)
- China (10)
- Unified Team (19)
- Finland (2)
- France (1)
- Great Britain (1)
- Germany (14)
- Hungary (2)
- Italy (4)
- Japan (15)
- South Korea (5)
- Mongolia (2)
- Netherlands (14)
- Norway (8)
- Poland (4)
- North Korea (5)
- Romania (3)
- Sweden (8)
- Czechoslovakia (2)
- United States (19)
- Yugoslavia (2)
