= L'anneau de vitesse =

French Sporting Venue

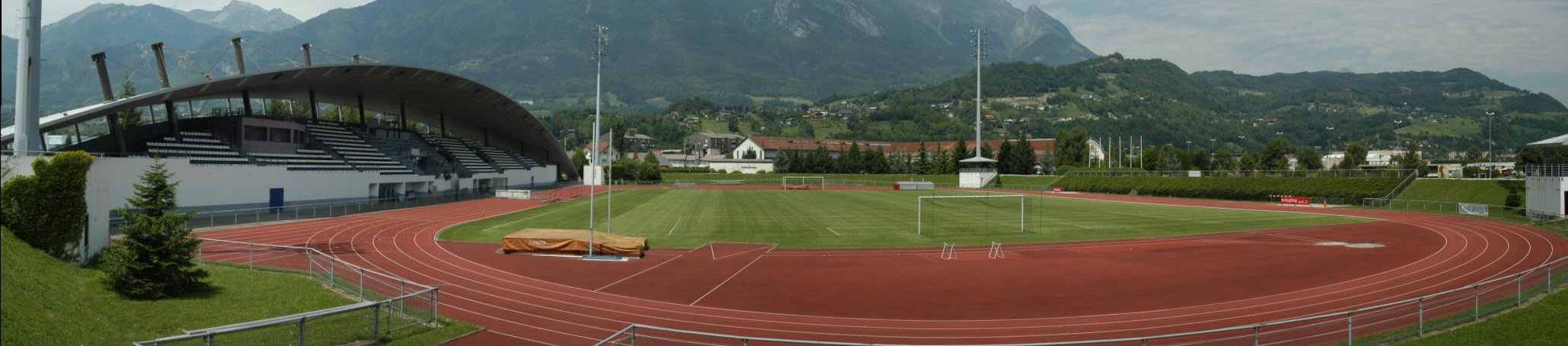
- Interactive map of L'anneau de vitesse
- Full name: Anneau de Vitesse du Sauvay
- Coordinates: 45°39′50.52″N 6°22′15.23″E

Construction
- Opened: 1991

L'anneau de vitesse (French for 'speed oval') is an outdoor sports venue in Albertville, France. It hosted speed skating events at the 1992 Winter Olympics.

The stands, which remain present, were constructed as an airfoil from aerospace designs. The ice was made using 70 km (43 mi) of piping using R32 and brine refrigeration to cool the track to between −5 and −8 °C (23 and 18 °F) with 4 cm-thick (1.6 in) ice. Before this the surface was covered with 1.20 m (3 ft 11 in) of base sand in order to lay down the piping.

The track serves nowadays as a multipurpose stadium used for athletics and football events.
