= Seiko Hashimoto =

Japanese politician and sportswoman (born 1964)

- 橋本 聖子
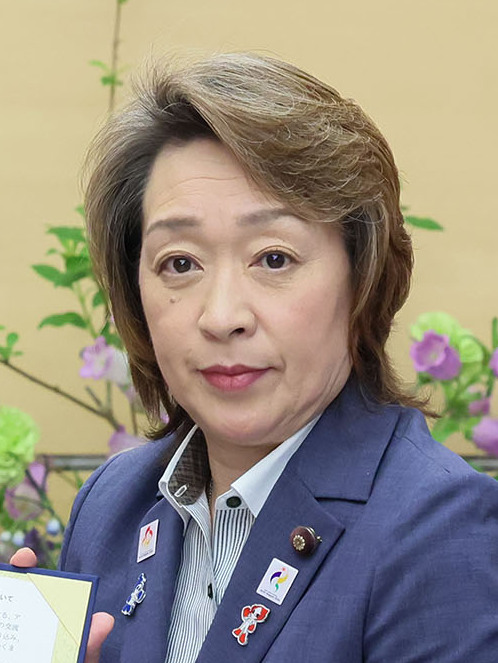
- Hashimoto in 2025

President of the Tokyo Organising Committee of the Olympic and Paralympic Games
- In office 18 February 2021 – 8 August 2021
- IOC President: Thomas Bach
- Preceded by: Yoshirō Mori
- Succeeded by: Tony Estanguet (Paris 2024)

Chair of the Tokyo Organising Committee of the Olympic and Paralympic Games
- In office 18 February 2021 – 30 June 2022
- Preceded by: Yoshirō Mori
- Succeeded by: Committee dissolved

Minister of State for Tokyo Olympic and Paralympic Games
- In office 11 September 2019 – 18 February 2021
- Prime Minister: Shinzo Abe; Yoshihide Suga
- Preceded by: Shun'ichi Suzuki
- Succeeded by: Tamayo Marukawa

Member of the House of Councillors
- Incumbent
- Assumed office 23 July 1995
- Constituency: National PR

Personal details
- Born: 5 October 1964 (age 62) Hayakita, Hokkaido, Japan
- Party: Liberal Democratic
- Spouse: Katsuhiko Ishizaki (m. 1998)
- Children: 6
- Relatives: Tatsuo Takahashi (brother-in-law)
- Education: Komazawa University

Seiko Hashimoto (Japanese: 橋本 聖子, Hepburn: Hashimoto Seiko; born 5 October 1964) is a Japanese politician, former speed skater and track cyclist. She has the most Olympic appearances of any Japanese athlete except Noriaki Kasai, representing her native country in four consecutive Winter Olympics from 1984 to 1994 and in three consecutive Summer Olympics from 1988 to 1996, making her a seven time Olympian. On top of her Olympic career, she is the mother of six children while working in politics and other leadership positions. She is currently a member of the House of Councillors from the Liberal Democratic Party, and served as the President of the Japan Skating Federation from 2006 to 2019.

She served on the Japanese Cabinet as Minister of State for the Tokyo Olympic and Paralympic Games from September 2019 until February 2021, when she became the President of the Tokyo 2020 Organizing Committee. She is only the second female in Olympic history to become president of a games' organizing committee after Gianna Angelopoulos-Daskalaki, President of the Athens 2004 organizing committee.

== Early life ==
Hashimoto was born in Hayakita, Hokkaido, in 1964, the youngest of four siblings. There is a pond on the ranch of her parents' house, which freezes in the winter to make skating rink for her and her siblings to skate on. She skated on that frozen farm pond with their friends from elementary school. She was active as a top female skater for a long time amongst her peers. Her first skating coach was Akira Otani, who worked at the Hayakita Town Office and volunteered to teach children living in the neighborhood to skate. Otani instructed her on skating from kindergarten to her first year of junior high school.

She graduated from a high school affiliated with Komazawa University in 1983 and joined the Fuji Kyuko railway company.

=== Father's influence ===
Her father gave her the name Seiko after the Olympic Flame (聖火, seika), inspired by the 1964 Tokyo Olympics that year. Her father's name is Zenkichi Hashimoto (Japanese: 橋本善吉, Hepburn: Hashimoto Zenkichi, died on 19 October 2020 at the age of 96). She started speed skating by her father's parental influence. He wished her to be an Olympian. She grew up hearing from him that she was born to participate in the Olympics. Her father was a strict person in everything on sports and housework, and he taught her skating and horseback riding. Under his influence, she began speed skating at the age of three and became the best speed skater in Japan in her second year of high school.

Medal record

Representing Japan

Women's speed skating

Olympic Games
Bronze medal – third place	1992 Albertville	1500 m

World Sprint Championships
Bronze medal – third place	1989 Heerenveen	Sprint

World Allround Championships
Silver medal – second place	1990 Calgary	Allround
Bronze medal – third place	1992 Heerenveen	Allround

Asian Winter Games
Gold medal – first place	1986 Sapporo	500 m
Gold medal – first place	1986 Sapporo	1500 m
Gold medal – first place	1990 Sapporo	500 m
Gold medal – first place	1990 Sapporo	1000 m
Gold medal – first place	1990 Sapporo	1500 m
Gold medal – first place	1990 Sapporo	3000 m

Women's track cycling

Asian Games
Bronze medal – third place	1994 Hiroshima	Individual pursuit

Asian Championships
Silver medal – second place	1995 Quezon City	Sprint

== Athletic career ==
She appeared in her first Olympics in 1984 in Sarajevo, competing in 500, 1000, 1500 and 3000 m speed skating events. In the 1988 Winter Olympics in Calgary, she placed fifth in both the 500 and 1000 m speed skating events. She won the bronze medal in the 1500 m speed skating event in her third Winter Olympic appearance at the 1992 Winter Olympics in Albertville, France, and also competed in the 1994 Winter Olympics in Lillehammer, placing sixth in the 3000 m speed skating event.

Her first Summer Olympics appearance as a cycling sprinter was at the 1988 Summer Olympics in Seoul, where she placed fifth in the women's sprint. She placed eleventh in the 3000 m individual pursuit at the 1992 Summer Olympics in Barcelona, and ninth in the point race at the 1996 Summer Olympics in Atlanta.

== Family life ==
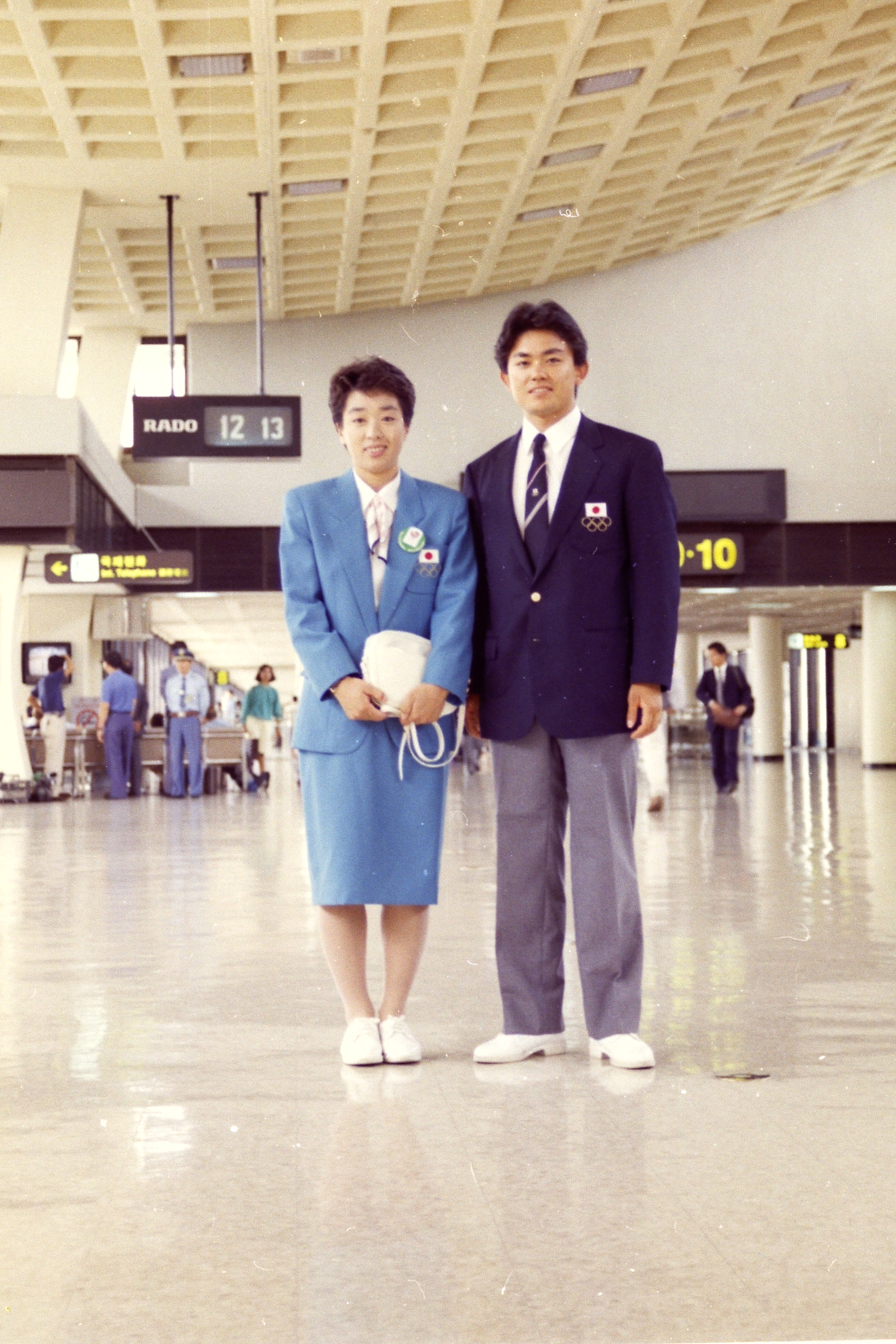
Seiko Hashimoto and Yoshihiro Tsumuraya, Seoul 1988 Summer Olympics at Gimpo International Airport

Hashimoto married Katsuhiko Ishizaki, a widowed police officer from the Diet of Japan in 1998, who brought three children into the marriage. Seiko Hashimoto kept her maiden name when she entered the House of Councilors, and her Husband changed his family name to Hashimoto as well, because in Japan, married couples must have the same last name.

She was the first lawmaker in Japan to give birth to her a child while in office in 2000, and later had 2 more children, becoming the mother of 6. Seiko Hashimoto gave birth to her three biological children after fertility treatments, and Seiko noted that (and advocated for) fertility treatment facilities gradually increasing access for fertility treatments compared to when she conceived her first biological daughter in 2000. She initially entrusted employees of her political office with the care of her children while at work but led an initiative to establish a childcare facility at the Diet of Japan, which opened in 2010.

== Political career ==
Seiko deals with health issues in politics and a decline in birth rate, and she is the Minister in Charge of Women's Empowerment. She hopes that young women participate in politics and that their voices should be directly reflected in it. As of 2020, the National Diet of Japan is 10.2% women.

Hashimoto resigned from Fuji Kyuko in 1993 and was elected to the House of Councilors in 1995, winning re-election in three subsequent elections. She competed in the Olympics while serving as a lawmaker in 1996. She served as Vice-Minister for Hokkaido Development from 2000 to 2001, as chair of the Education Committee from 2001 to 2003, as deputy secretary-general of the LDP from 2003, and as state secretary (senior vice-minister) for foreign affairs under the Taro Aso administration (2008–2009).

Following the resignation of Tokyo governor Naoki Inose on 19 December 2013, she was rumored to be a potential candidate for the gubernatorial election expected to be held in February 2014, along with Yuriko Koike, Hakubun Shimomura, Hideo Higashikokubaru and Yoichi Masuzoe. The LDP excluded her name from consideration in a 20 December telephone poll due to her responsibilities as head of the Japanese competitor delegation to the 2014 Winter Olympics. Seiko had to leave her position as one of two women in Prime Minister Yoshihide Suga's cabinet to accept her role in the 2020 Tokyo Olympics committee.

In April 2024, Hashimoto was given 12-month suspension from the party office because of the slush funds scandal. It has been revealed that Hashimoto received 20.57 million yen in kickbacks from Liberal Democratic Party and Abe faction, which was not recorded in the income and expenditure report.

== Olympic leadership ==
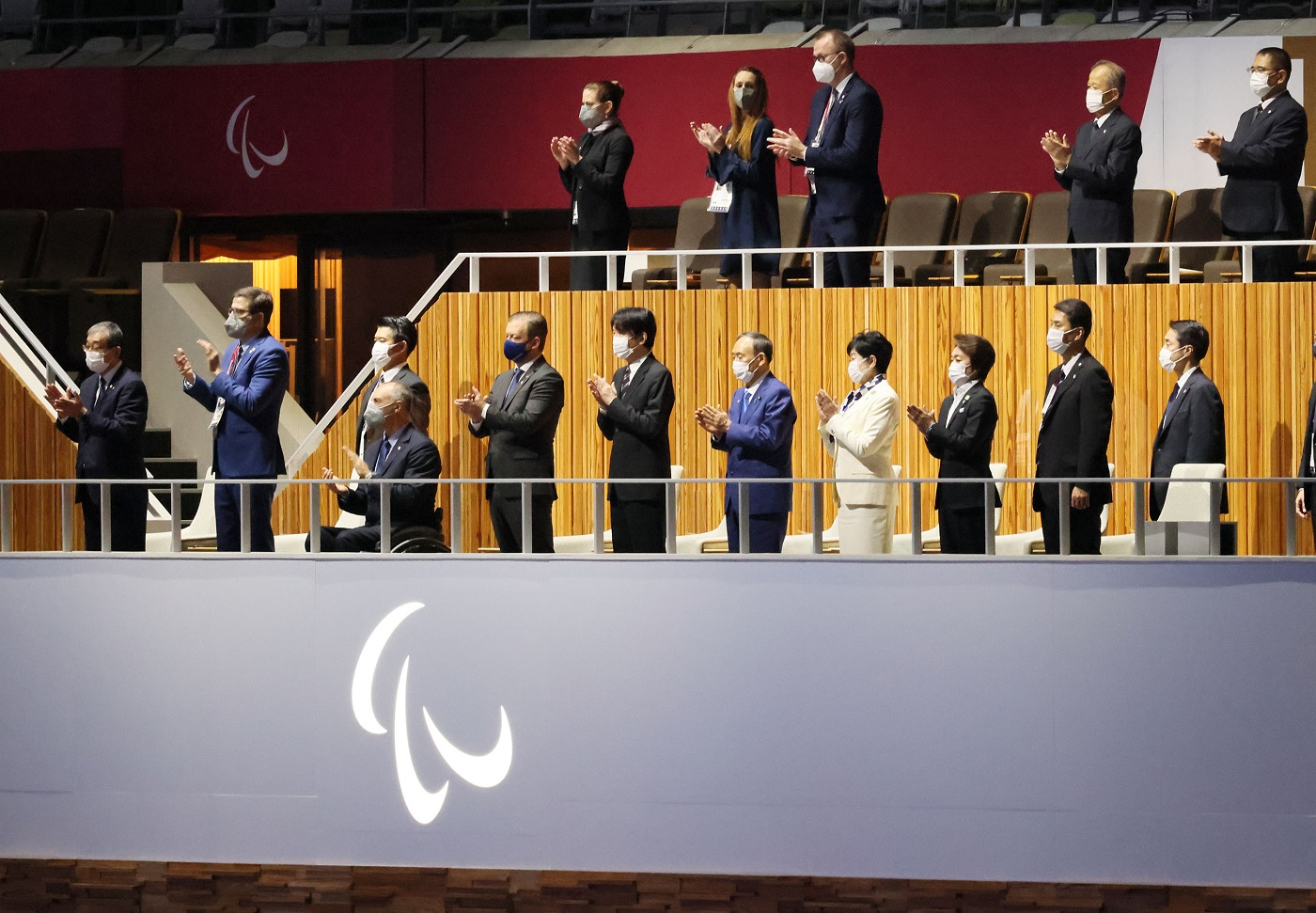
Andrew Parsons Crown Prince Fumihito Yoshihide Suga Yuriko Koike and Seiko Hashimoto cropped Yoshihide Suga 20210905 1.jpg

In August 2014, Hashimoto became embroiled in accusations of sexual harassment of Japanese male figure skater Daisuke Takahashi. Weekly magazine Shukan Bunshun published a story with several photographs showing Hashimoto and Takahashi dancing at a party following the closing of the Sochi Winter Olympics. Several magazines said that she hugged and kissed him due to their unequal power dynamics, because she was on the Olympic committee, a politician, and a former Olympian herself. In contrast, Takahashi, known as the prince on ice in Japan, objected to the magazine's article and did not think that her behaviors are connected to sexual or power harassment. The story alleged that Hashimoto had kissed Takahashi several times despite the latter's obvious attempts to resist. Hashimoto denied the allegations. Takahashi's management also said that the popular skater had not been harassed.

In September 2019, Hashimoto became the Minister of State for Tokyo Olympic and Paralympic Games. On 18 February 2021, she stepped down from that role in order to take over as President of the Tokyo 2020 Organizing Committee. Hashimoto replaced former Prime Minister Yoshirō Mori, who had earlier offered his resignation following comments he made at a committee meeting that were regarded as sexist. Mori claims to have received criticism from his wife, daughter, and granddaughter for his statements. In response to his comments, many women lawmakers, as well as some men, wore white as a means protesting to express their disagreement with his comments A few of Seiko Hashimoto's colleagues in the Diet of Japan made a petition for Mori's resignation.

In February 2022, she received the 2021 IOC Women and Sport Awards, which was presented to individuals or a group who has contributed to give opportunity, recognition, and empowerment foe women in sports. She was evaluated to promote gender equality, increasing the ratio of the female directors by roughly 40% in the Olympic Organizing Committee (OOC).

A nonpartisan sports all-party parliamentary group decided to launch an all-party parliamentary federation to invite the 2030 Sapporo Winter Olympics/ Paralympics. Seiko Hashimoto, The Tokyo Organizing Committee of the Olympic and Paralympic Games serves as chairman again.

On 26 June 2025, Hashimoto became the first woman to be elected president of the Japanese Olympic Committee.

== See also ==
- Maruzensky - Thoroughbred racehorse owned by Seiko Hashimoto's father

Sporting positions
Preceded by (Brazil) Carlos Arthur Nuzman	President of Organizing Committee for Summer Olympic Games; 2020	Succeeded by (France) Tony Estanguet
