= South Korea at the 1990 Asian Winter Games =

- IOC code: KOR
- NOC: Korean Olympic Committee

in Sapporo
- Competitors: 63
- Medals Ranked 3rd: Gold 6 Silver 7 Bronze 8 Total 21

Asian Winter Games appearances (overview)
- 1986; 1990; 1996; 1999; 2003; 2007; 2011; 2017; 2025; 2029

South Korea (IOC designation:Korea) participated in the 1990 Asian Winter Games held in Sapporo, Japan from March 9, 1990 to March 14, 1990.

== Medal summary ==
=== Medal table ===
| Sport | Gold | Silver | Bronze | Total |
|---|---|---|---|---|
| Short track speed skating | 4 | 5 | 2 | 11 |
| Speed skating | 2 | 1 | 3 | 6 |
| Cross-country skiing | 0 | 1 | 0 | 1 |
| Alpine skiing | 0 | 0 | 1 | 1 |
| Biathlon | 0 | 0 | 1 | 1 |
| Ice hockey | 0 | 0 | 1 | 1 |
| Totals (6 entries) | 6 | 7 | 8 | 21 |

=== Medalists ===
| Medal | Name | Sport | Event |
|---|---|---|---|
| Gold | Kim Ki-hoon | Short track speed skating | Men's 1000 m |
| Gold | Kim Ki-hoon | Short track speed skating | Men's 1500 m |
| Gold | Team Korea | Short track speed skating | Men's 5000 m relay |
| Gold | Kim So-hee | Short track speed skating | Women's 1500 m |
| Gold | Bae Ki-tae | Speed skating | Men's 1000 m |
| Gold | Bae Ki-tae | Speed skating | Men's 1500 m |
| Silver | Team Korea | Cross-country skiing | Men's 4 x 10 km Relay |
| Silver | Kim Ki-hoon | Short track speed skating | Men's 500 m |
| Silver | Lee Joon-ho | Short track speed skating | Men's 1500 m |
| Silver | Lee Joon-ho | Short track speed skating | Men's 3000 m |
| Silver | Lee Hyun-jung | Short track speed skating | Women's 1000 m |
| Silver | Team Korea | Short track speed skating | Women's 3000 m Relay |
| Silver | Bae Ki-tae | Speed skating | Men's 500 m |
| Bronze | Hur Seung-wook | Alpine skiing | Men's Slalom |
| Bronze | Team Korea | Biathlon | 4 x 7.5 km Relay |
| Bronze | Team Korea | Ice hockey | Men's competition |
| Bronze | Kwon Young-chul | Short track speed skating | Men's 1000 m |
| Bronze | Chun Lee-kyung | Short track speed skating | Women's 1000 m |
| Bronze | Lee In-hoon | Speed skating | Men's 1500 m |
| Bronze | Oh Yong-seok | Speed skating | Men's 5000 m |
| Bronze | Yoo Seon-hee | Speed skating | Women's 1500 m |
