= Chong Chang-suk =

North Korean speed skater (born 1974)

Personal information
- Nationality: North Korean
- Born: 29 November 1974 (age 50)

Sport
- Sport: Speed skating

Chong Chang-suk (born 29 November 1974) is a North Korean speed skater. She competed in three events at the 1992 Winter Olympics.
