= Kyoko Shimazaki =

Japanese speed skater (born 1972)

Personal information
- Nationality: Japanese
- Born: 7 January 1972 (age 53); Otofuke, Hokkaido, Japan

Sport
- Sport: Speed skating

Kyoko Shimazaki (島崎 京子, Shimazaki Kyōko, born 7 January 1972) is a Japanese speed skater. She competed at the 1992, 1994 and the 1998 Winter Olympics.
