= China at the 1990 Asian Winter Games =

- IOC code: CHN
- NOC: Chinese Olympic Committee external link (in Chinese and English)

in Sapporo
- Medals Ranked 2nd: Gold 9 Silver 9 Bronze 8 Total 26

Asian Winter Games appearances
- 1986; 1990; 1996; 1999; 2003; 2007; 2011; 2017; 2025; 2029

China competed in the 1990 Asian Winter Games which were held in Sapporo, Japan from March 9, 1990 to March 14, 1990. It won 9 gold, 9 silver and 8 bronze medals.

== See also ==
- China at the Asian Games
- China at the Olympics
- Sports in China
