= 1990 Asian Winter Games =

Multi-sport event in Sapporo, Japan

II Asian Winter Games
- Host city: Sapporo, Hokkaidō, Japan
- Nations: 9
- Athletes: 310
- Events: 33 in 4 sports
- Opening: March 9, 1990
- Closing: March 14, 1990
- Opened by: Akihito; Emperor of Japan
- Athlete's Oath: Seiko Hashimoto
- Main venue: Makomanai Indoor Stadium

Summer

Winter

The 2nd Asian Winter Games (Japanese: 第2回アジア冬季競技大会, romanized: Dai 2-kai Ajia tōkikyōgitaikai), also known as Sapporo 1990 (Japanese: 札幌1990), were held from March 9 to 14, 1990, in Sapporo, Hokkaidō, Japan. India was originally scheduled to host the second edition of the games, but due to technical and financial difficulties it gave up its hosting rights to Japan in 1989. The 2nd Winter Asiad saw three NOCs participating in the games for the first time: Chinese Taipei, Iran and the Philippines.

== Sports ==
Events from only six sports were held in the Second Winter Asiad. Figure skating was temporarily out due to conflict with the 1990 World Figure Skating Championships, while Large-hill (90m) Ski Jumping was again a demonstration sport.

- Alpine skiing (4) ()
- Biathlon (3) ()
- Cross-country skiing (6) ()
- Ice hockey (1) ()
- Short-track speed skating (10) ()
- Speed skating (9) ()

Demonstration sports

- Ski jumping (1) ()

== Participating nations ==
Teams from Iran, Chinese Taipei and the Philippines made their debut at the event, which had a total of over three hundred athletes entering from nine nations.

- China (73)
- Chinese Taipei (5)
- India (12)
- Iran (10)
- Japan (80)
- Mongolia (7)
- North Korea (54)
- Philippines (1)
- South Korea (63)

Non-competing nations

Hong Kong, which had sent a delegation of figure skaters to the last games, this time sent only officials.

- Hong Kong

== Medal table ==
* Host nation (Japan)

Rank	Nation	Gold	Silver	Bronze	Total
1	Japan*	18	16	13	47
2	China	9	9	8	26
3	South Korea	6	7	8	21
4	North Korea	0	1	4	5
5	Mongolia	0	0	1	1
Totals (5 entries)		33	33	34	100

Preceded by Sapporo	Asian Winter Games; Sapporo; II Asian Winter Games (1990)	Succeeded by Harbin
