= 1992 Winter Olympics =

Multi-sport event in Albertville, France

XVI Olympic Winter Games
- Emblem of the 1992 Winter Olympics (Note: The emblem is the flag of Savoy region in the shape of the Olympic flame, dancing above stripes representing the flag of France.)
- Location: Albertville, France
- Motto: Savoie en Fête (English: Party in Savoie)
- Nations: 64
- Athletes: 1,802 (1,314 men, 488 women)
- Events: 57 in 6 sports (12 disciplines)
- Opening: 8 February 1992
- Closing: 23 February 1992
- Opened by: President François Mitterrand
- Closed by: IOC president Juan Antonio Samaranch
- Cauldron: François-Cyrille Grange; Michel Platini
- Stadium: Théâtre des Cérémonies

The 1992 Winter Olympics, officially known as the XVI Olympic Winter Games (French: XVI^{es} Jeux Olympiques d'hiver) and commonly known as Albertville '92 (Arpitan: Arbèrtvile '92), were a winter multi-sport event held from 8 to 23 February 1992 in and around Albertville, France. Albertville won the bid to host the Winter Olympics in 1986, beating Sofia, Falun, Lillehammer, Cortina d'Ampezzo, Anchorage, and Berchtesgaden. The 1992 Winter Olympics were the last winter games held in the same year as the Summer Olympics. The next Winter Olympics were held two years after this one instead of the usual four, which allowed the Olympic Games to take place on every even-numbered year instead of every four years. The Games were the fifth Olympic Games held in France and the country's third Winter Olympics, after the 1924 Winter Games in Chamonix and the 1968 Winter Games in Grenoble. This games was the first of two consecutive Olympic games to be held in Western Europe, preceding the 1992 Summer Olympics in Barcelona, Spain.

18 events in Figure skating, short track speed skating, speed skating, and the opening and closing ceremonies took place in Albertville. The 39 other events were held in the nearby 9 villages and resorts around Savoie: Courchevel, La Plagne, Les Arcs, Les Menuires, Les Saisies, Méribel, Pralognan-la-Vanoise, Tignes, and Val d'Isère. Sixty-four National Olympic Committees and 1,801 athletes participated in six sports and fifty-seven events. This included both the Unified Team, representing the non-Baltic former Soviet republics, and Germany, newly consolidated again as a team following the reunification of the former East and West Germany in 1990. The event also saw the debut of eight nations in the Winter Olympics. The Winter Olympic program has grown this time with the addition of 11 new events. While sports that were already on the program received 5 new events (2 new events in cross-country skiing, at the same time women were allowed to compete in biathlon for the first time and won 3 events exclusive to them.) Another 6 events were added with the implementation of 2 sports that were demonstrated 4 years earlier (freestyle skiing and short track speed skating). These were the last Winter Olympics to include demonstration sports, consisting of curling, aerials and ski ballet, and speed skiing. Due to a rule change implemented in 1986, this was the last edition in the history of the Winter Olympic Games in which all speed skating events were held in an open-air venue.

== Host city selection ==
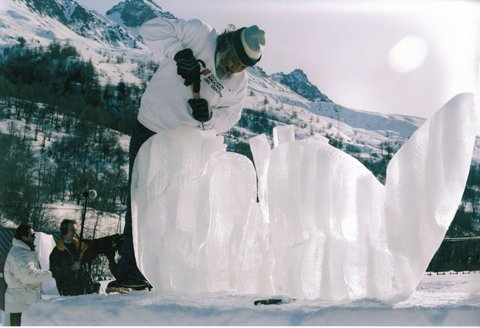
Mexican sculptor Abel Ramírez Águilar working on his gold medal piece in snow sculpture competition related to the Games

A record-breaking seven locations bid for the games. The non-winning bids were from Anchorage, Berchtesgaden, Cortina d'Ampezzo, Falun, Lillehammer, and Sofia. The 91st IOC Session, held in Lausanne on 17 October 1986, voted Albertville the host of the Games.

1992 Winter Olympics bidding results
City	Country	Round					
City	Country	1	2	3	4	Run-off	5
Albertville	France	19	26	29	42	—	51
Sofia	Bulgaria	25	25	28	24	—	25
Falun	Sweden	10	11	11	11	41	9
Lillehammer	Norway	10	11	9	11	40	—
Cortina d'Ampezzo	Italy	7	6	7	—	—	—
Anchorage	United States	7	5	—	—	—	—
Berchtesgaden	West Germany	6	—	—	—	—	—

== Highlights ==
Bjørn Dæhlie and Vegard Ulvang dominated the men's cross-country skiing races, both taking home three gold medals with Norway taking a medal sweep in the event. 16-year-old Ski jumper Toni Nieminen became the youngest male gold medalist in a Winter Olympic event until 2002. Petra Kronberger won both the combined event and the slalom of alpine skiing, while Bonnie Blair won both the 500 m and 1000 m speed skating events, and Gunda Niemann took both of the longest races.

Three National Olympic Committees in Asia-Pacific region won their first medals at the Winter Olympics, one in a sport making its debut at the Games (short track speed skating.) Kim Ki-hoon's gold medal in 1000 m short track speed skating signified South Korea's first medal in the Winter Olympics, while Ye Qiaobo's silver medal in women's 500 m speed skating represented China's first Winter Olympics medal. Annelise Coberger from New Zealand became the first Oceanian athlete to win a medal in women's alpine skiing slalom, making her the first athlete from the southern hemisphere to mount the podium at the Winter Games.

Swiss speed skier Nicolas Bochatay died on the penultimate day of the Games when he crashed into a snow-grooming vehicle during a training run.

== Legacy ==
The 1992 Olympic Winter Games marked the last time both the Winter and Summer games were held in the same year. The 1992 Winter Olympics also marked the last time France hosted the Olympics until 2024, when Paris became the second city to host the Summer Olympics three times. France is set to host the Winter Games in 2030 in the French Alps, 38 years after Albertville played host and will host it again in 2030.

=== Cost and cost overrun ===
The Oxford Olympics Study established the outturn cost of the Albertville 1992 Winter Olympics at US$2.0 billion (in 2015-dollars) and cost overrun at 137% in real terms. This includes sports-related costs only, that is: (i) operational costs incurred by the organizing committee to stage the Games, e.g., expenditures for technology, transportation, workforce, administration, security, catering, ceremonies, and medical services; and (ii) direct capital costs incurred by the host city and country or private investors to build, e.g., the competition venues, the Olympic village, international broadcast center, and media and press center, which are required to host the Games. Indirect capital costs were not included, e.g. road, rail, or airport infrastructure, or hotel upgrades or other business investment incurred in preparation for the Games but not directly related to their staging. In comparison, the cost and cost overrun of the 2010 Vancouver Winter Olympics were US$2.5 billion and 13%, respectively, while the 2014 Sochi Winter Olympics (the most costly Olympics to date) had costs and cost overrun at US$51 billion and 289%, respectively. The average cost for the Winter Games since 1960 is US$3.1 billion, while the average cost overrun is 142%.

== Mascot ==
The 1992 Winter Games mascot, Magique (Magic), was a small imp in the shape of a star and a cube. The mascot was created by Philippe Mairesse and replaced the bid mascot, which was a mountain goat. The star shape symbolized dreams and imagination, while the mascot's red and blue colors originated from the French flag.

== Sports ==
There were 57 events contested in 6 sports (12 disciplines). See the medal winners, ordered by sport:

- Alpine skiing (10)
- Biathlon (6)
- Bobsleigh (2)
- Cross-country skiing (10)
- Figure skating (4)
- Freestyle skiing (2)
- Ice hockey (1)
- Luge (3)
- Nordic combined (2)
- Ski jumping (3)
- Short track speed skating (4)
- Speed skating (10)

=== Demonstration sports ===
This was the last time demonstration events were included in the Winter Olympics program. Of the 8 events that were under evaluation, 4 received the endorsement to be included in an official form in future editions of the Games (Curling tournaments and the aerials events on the freestyle skiing). The other four events (speed skiing and skiing ballet events on the freestyle skiing) were rejected and have not since returned.

- Curling – Was an official sport in the Olympic program in 1924, after which it was a demonstration sport twice, in 1932 and 1988. There was a possibility of re-inclusion in Lillehammer 1994, but in 1990 the IOC Executive Committee rejected its return as an official sport. The IOC accepted its return in Nagano 1998.
- Freestyle skiing – Like curling, it was a demonstration sport four years previously before becoming part of the official program. Only moguls skiing received this status, while aerials and ballet remained demonstration events. Aerials became an official event two years later, while ballet skiing appeared in the games for the last time, going into a progressive decline and losing its status as a competitive discipline by the International Ski Federation (FIS) in 2000.
- Speed skiing – Considered one of the most dangerous events in the sporting world, the discipline won a chance to be evaluated by the International Olympic Committee and the FIS for possible inclusion in a future program. The event, hosted at Les Arcs, was a success, pushing the world record to 229.299 km/h (142mph). Tragically, after qualifying for the final, Swiss skier Nicolas Bochatay ran into a snow-grooming vehicle while skiing on an adjacent public slope with a teammate, dying instantly. According to reports, Bochatay crested a small hill and crashed into the machine which he had not seen. The discipline has not been featured on an Olympic Games program since then.

== Participating nations ==
Sixty-four nations sent competitors to the 1992 Olympics, including seven nations making their first appearance at a Winter Olympics. Following the collapse of the Soviet Union in 1991, six former-Soviet bloc nations chose to form a Unified Team, while the Baltic states of Estonia, Latvia and Lithuania competed as independent nations for the first time since 1936. Czechoslovakia made its last appearance in the Winter Olympics before its dissolution at the end of 1992. United Nations Security Council Resolution 757 took effect on 30 May 1992 (97 days after the closing ceremonies), and Yugoslav athletes were able to participate under their country's national symbols. It also suspended the activities of the Yugoslav Olympic Committee, making the country's athletes ineligible to compete on the 1992 Summer Olympics. Despite this, some of their athletes classified in individual sports and gained authorization to compete as Independent Olympic Participants (which also happened at the 1992 Summer Paralympics). A team under the name Yugoslavia returned to the Olympic Games in the 1996 Summer Olympics, when only Serbia, Montenegro and Kosovo were still part of the country. The 1992 Winter Olympics were the first time since the 1964 Summer Olympics that Germany competed with a unified team. Seven National Olympic Committees sent their first delegations to the Winter Olympics: Algeria, Bermuda, Brazil, Honduras, Ireland, Swaziland, Croatia, and Slovenia (the last two making their first appearances at any Olympics, just a few months after their respective declarations of independence from Yugoslavia). Through the 2022 Winter Olympics, this has been the only participation of Swaziland (now Eswatini) and Honduras in an edition of the Winter Olympics.

Participating National Olympic Committees
- Algeria (4)
- Andorra (5)
- Argentina (20)
- Australia (23)
- Austria (58)
- Belgium (5)
- Bermuda (1)
- Bolivia (5)
- Brazil (7)
- Bulgaria (30)
- Canada (108)
- Chile (5)
- China (32)
- Chinese Taipei (8)
- Costa Rica (4)
- Croatia (4)
- Cyprus (4)
- Czechoslovakia (74)
- Denmark (6)
- Estonia (19)
- Finland (62)
- France (109) (host)
- Germany (111)
- Great Britain (49)
- Greece (8)
- Honduras (1)
- Hungary (24)
- Iceland (5)
- India (2)
- Ireland (4)
- Italy (107)
- Jamaica (5)
- Japan (60)
- Latvia (23)
- Lebanon (4)
- Liechtenstein (7)
- Lithuania (6)
- Luxembourg (1)
- Mexico (20)
- Monaco (5)
- Mongolia (4)
- Morocco (12)
- Netherlands (19)
- Netherlands Antilles (2)
- New Zealand (6)
- North Korea (20)
- Norway (80)
- Philippines (1)
- Poland (53)
- Puerto Rico (6)
- Romania (23)
- San Marino (3)
- Senegal (2)
- Slovenia (27)
- South Korea (23)
- Spain (17)
- Swaziland (1)
- Sweden (73)
- Switzerland (74)
- Turkey (8)
- Unified Team (129)
- United States (147)
- Virgin Islands (12)
- Yugoslavia (25)

=== Number of athletes by National Olympic Committees ===
IOC Letter Code	Country	Athletes
USA	United States	147
EUN	Unified Team	129
GER	Germany	111
FRA	France	109
CAN	Canada	108
ITA	Italy	107
NOR	Norway	80
TCH	Czechoslovakia	74
SUI	Switzerland	74
SWE	Sweden	73
FIN	Finland	62
JPN	Japan	60
AUT	Austria	58
POL	Poland	53
GBR	Great Britain	49
CHN	China	32
BUL	Bulgaria	30
SLO	Slovenia	27
YUG	Yugoslavia	25
HUN	Hungary	24
AUS	Australia	23
KOR	South Korea	23
LAT	Latvia	23
ROU	Romania	23
ARG	Argentina	20
PRK	North Korea	20
MEX	Mexico	20
EST	Estonia	19
NED	Netherlands	19
ESP	Spain	17
MAR	Morocco	12
ISV	Virgin Islands	12
GRE	Greece	8
TPE	Chinese Taipei	8
TUR	Turkey	8
BRA	Brazil	7
LIE	Liechtenstein	7
DEN	Denmark	6
LTU	Lithuania	6
NZL	New Zealand	6
PUR	Puerto Rico	6
AND	Andorra	5
BEL	Belgium	5
CHI	Chile	5
ISL	Iceland	5
JAM	Jamaica	5
MON	Monaco	5
ALG	Algeria	4
BOL	Bolivia	4
CRC	Costa Rica	4
CRO	Croatia	4
CYP	Cyprus	4
IRL	Ireland	4
LIB	Lebanon	4
MGL	Mongolia	4
SMR	San Marino	3
IND	India	2
AHO	Netherlands Antilles	2
SEN	Senegal	2
BER	Bermuda	1
HON	Honduras	1
LUX	Luxembourg	1
PHI	Philippines	1
SWZ	Swaziland	1
Total		1,801

== Venues ==
The 1992 Games are the last in which the speed skating venue was outdoors.

- Albertville Olympic Park
  - Halle Olympique – Figure skating and short-track speed skating
  - L'anneau de vitesse – Speed skating
  - Théâtre des Cérémonies – Ceremonies (opening & closing)
- Bourg-Saint-Maurice
  - Les Arcs – Speed skiing
- Saint-Bon-Tarentaise
  - Courchevel – Ski jumping and Nordic combined
- Saint-Martin-de-Belleville
  - Les Ménuires – Alpine skiing (slalom men)
- Les Allues
  - Méribel – Alpine skiing (women)
  - Méribel Ice Palace – Ice hockey
- La Plagne – Bobsleigh and luge
- Pralognan-la-Vanoise – Curling
- Hauteluce
  - Les Saisies – Biathlon, cross-country skiing
- Tignes – Freestyle skiing
- Val d'Isère – Alpine skiing (men combined, downhill, giant slalom, and super-giant slalom)

== Medal table ==
(Host nation is highlighted.)

* Host nation (France)

Rank	Nation	Gold	Silver	Bronze	Total
1	Germany	10	10	6	26
2	Unified Team^{1}	9	6	8	23
3	Norway	9	6	5	20
4	Austria	6	7	8	21
5	United States	5	4	2	11
6	Italy	4	6	4	14
7	France*	3	5	1	9
8	Finland	3	1	3	7
9	Canada	2	3	2	7
10	South Korea	2	1	1	4
Totals (10 entries)		53	49	40	142

(^{1} combined team with athletes from 6 nations of the Commonwealth of Independent States; the team only appeared in these Winter Olympics)

=== Podium sweeps ===
Date	Sport	Event	NOC	Gold	Silver	Bronze
10 February	Cross-country skiing	Men's 30 kilometre classical	Norway	Vegard Ulvang	Bjørn Dæhlie	Terje Langli
17 February	Speed skating	Women's 5000 metres	Germany	Gunda Niemann-Kleemann	Heike Warnicke	Claudia Pechstein

== Schedule ==
OC	Opening ceremony	●	Event competitions	1	Event finals	CC	Closing ceremony

February 1992	8th Sat	9th Sun	10th Mon	11th Tue	12th Wed	13th Thu	14th Fri	15th Sat	16th Sun	17st Mon	18th Tue	19th Wed	20th Thu	21st Fri	22nd Sat	23rd Sun	Events
Ceremonies	OC															CC	—N/a
Alpine skiing		1	●	1	●	1		1	1		2	1	1		1		10
Biathlon				1	1		1		1			1	1				6
Bobsleigh								●	1					●	1		2
Cross country skiing		1	1			2		2		1	1			1	1		10
Figure skating		●		1		●	●	1	●	1		●		1			4
Freestyle skiing					●	2											2
Ice hockey	●	●	●	●	●	●	●	●	●	●	●	●	●	●	●	1	1
Luge		●	1	●	1		1										3
Nordic combined				●	1				●	1							2
Short track											●		3		1		4
Ski jumping		1					1		1								3
Speed skating		1	1		1	1	1	1	1	1	1		1				10
Daily medal events		4	3	3	4	6	4	5	5	4	4	2	6	2	4	1	57
Cumulative total		4	7	10	14	20	24	29	34	38	42	44	50	52	56	57	57
February 1992	8th Sat	9th Sun	10th Mon	11th Tue	12th Wed	13th Thu	14th Fri	15th Sat	16th Sun	17st Mon	18th Tue	19th Wed	20th Thu	21st Fri	22nd Sat	23rd Sun	Total events

== See also ==
- 1992 Winter Paralympics
- 1992 Summer Paralympics
- 1992 Summer Olympics
- Olympic Games held in France
  - 1900 Summer Olympics – Paris
  - 1924 Summer Olympics – Paris
  - 1924 Winter Olympics – Chamonix
  - 1968 Winter Olympics – Grenoble
  - 1992 Winter Olympics – Albertville
  - 2024 Summer Olympics – Paris
  - 2030 Winter Olympics – French Alps
- List of IOC country codes

Winter Olympics
Preceded by Calgary	XVI Olympic Winter Games; Albertville; 1992	Succeeded by Lillehammer
