= Speed skating at the 2007 Asian Winter Games – Women's 500 metres =

Women's 500 metres at the 2007 Asian Winter Games
- Venue: Jilin Provincial Speed Skating Rink
- Dates: 30 January 2007
- Competitors: 16 from 6 nations

Medalists
| gold medal | Wang Beixing | China |
| silver medal | Lee Sang-hwa | South Korea |
| bronze medal | Zhang Shuang | China |

The women's 500 metres at the 2007 Asian Winter Games was held on 30 January 2007 in Changchun, China.

== Schedule ==
All times are China Standard Time (UTC+08:00)

| Date | Time | Event |
|---|---|---|
| Tuesday, 30 January 2007 | 16:00 | 1st race |
| Tuesday, 30 January 2007 | 17:30 | 2nd race |

== Records ==
=== 500 meters ===
Prior to this competition, the existing world and Games records were as follows.

| World Record | Catriona Le May Doan (CAN) | 37.22 | Calgary, Canada | 9 December 2001 |
| Games Record | Wang Manli (CHN) | 39.20 | Hachinohe, Japan | 2 February 2003 |

=== 500 meters × 2 ===
Prior to this competition, the existing world and Games records were as follows.

| World Record | Catriona Le May Doan (CAN) | 1:14.72 | Salt Lake City, United States | 9 March 2001 |
| Games Record | Wang Manli (CHN) | 1:18.41 | Hachinohe, Japan | 3 February 2003 |

== Results ==
Legend

- DNF — Did not finish
- DNS — Did not start

| Rank | Athlete | 1st race | | 2nd race | | Total | Notes |
| Rank | Athlete | Pair | Time | Pair | Time | Total | Notes |
|---|---|---|---|---|---|---|---|
| 1st place, gold medalist(s) | Wang Beixing (CHN) | 6 | 38.02 GR | 8 | 38.08 | 1:16.10 | GR |
| 2nd place, silver medalist(s) | Lee Sang-hwa (KOR) | 8 | 38.53 | 8 | 38.42 | 1:16.95 | |
| 3rd place, bronze medalist(s) | Zhang Shuang (CHN) | 5 | 38.83 | 6 | 38.76 | 1:17.59 | |
| 4 | Shihomi Shinya (JPN) | 6 | 38.71 | 7 | 38.92 | 1:17.63 | |
| 5 | Sayuri Osuga (JPN) | 7 | 38.82 | 7 | 38.85 | 1:17.67 | |
| 6 | Ren Hui (CHN) | 5 | 38.90 | 6 | 39.04 | 1:17.94 | |
| 7 | Tomomi Okazaki (JPN) | 8 | 39.91 | 5 | 39.56 | 1:19.47 | |
| 8 | Choi Seung-yong (KOR) | 2 | 39.96 | 4 | 39.95 | 1:19.91 | |
| 9 | Kim Yoo-rim (KOR) | 3 | 40.22 | 5 | 39.84 | 1:20.06 | |
| 10 | Ko Hyon-suk (PRK) | 1 | 39.96 | 3 | 40.23 | 1:20.19 | |
| 11 | Lee Bo-ra (KOR) | 4 | 40.26 | 2 | 40.52 | 1:20.78 | |
| 12 | Mariya Ivanova (KAZ) | 1 | 43.63 | 4 | 43.73 | 1:27.36 | |
| 13 | Yelena Obaturova (KAZ) | 3 | 45.04 | 1 | 45.26 | 1:30.30 | |
| 14 | Bat-Erdeniin Urgaatsetseg (MGL) | 4 | 48.65 | 2 | 46.93 | 1:35.58 | |
| 15 | Narangereliin Odtsetseg (MGL) | 2 | 47.99 | 3 | 47.81 | 1:35.80 | |
| — | Xing Aihua (CHN) | 7 | 39.54 | | DNS | DNF | |
