= Speed skating at the 2007 Asian Winter Games – Women's 1000 metres =

Women's 1000 metres at the 2007 Asian Winter Games
- Venue: Jilin Provincial Speed Skating Rink
- Dates: 1 February 2007
- Competitors: 19 from 6 nations

Medalists
gold medal	Wang Beixing	China
silver medal	Wang Fei	China
bronze medal	Ren Hui	China
bronze medal	Kim Yoo-rim	South Korea

The women's 1000 metres at the 2007 Asian Winter Games was held on 1 February 2007 in Changchun, China.

== Schedule ==
All times are China Standard Time (UTC+08:00)

Date	Time	Event
Thursday, 1 February 2007	16:00	Final

== Records ==
Prior to this competition, the existing world and Games records were as follows.

World Record	Cindy Klassen (CAN)	1:13.11	Calgary, Canada	25 March 2006
Games Record	Aki Tonoike (JPN)	1:21.01	Hachinohe, Japan	5 February 2003

== Results ==
Rank	Pair	Athlete	Time	Notes
1st place, gold medalist(s)	7	Wang Beixing (CHN)	1:17.35	GR
2nd place, silver medalist(s)	8	Wang Fei (CHN)	1:17.54	
3rd place, bronze medalist(s)	7	Ren Hui (CHN)	1:18.84	
3rd place, bronze medalist(s)	10	Kim Yoo-rim (KOR)	1:18.96	
5	9	Lee Sang-hwa (KOR)	1:19.24	
6	10	Tomomi Okazaki (JPN)	1:19.47	
7	8	Shihomi Shinya (JPN)	1:19.88	
8	9	Zhang Shuang (CHN)	1:19.99	
9	6	Maki Tabata (JPN)	1:20.11	
10	3	Ko Hyon-suk (PRK)	1:20.35	
11	6	Wang Hee-jee (KOR)	1:20.52	
12	4	Choi Seung-yong (KOR)	1:20.92	
13	3	Natalya Rybakova (KAZ)	1:21.47	
14	5	Anzhelika Gavrilova (KAZ)	1:23.42	
15	4	O Hyon-sun (PRK)	1:25.95	
16	2	Mariya Ivanova (KAZ)	1:27.21	
17	5	Yelena Obaturova (KAZ)	1:29.82	
18	1	Bat-Erdeniin Urgaatsetseg (MGL)	1:37.30	
19	2	Narangereliin Odtsetseg (MGL)	2:01.63	

- Kim Yoo-rim was awarded bronze because of no three-medal sweep per country rule.
