= Speed skating at the 2007 Asian Winter Games – Men's 1000 metres =

Men's 1000 metres at the 2007 Asian Winter Games
- Venue: Jilin Provincial Speed Skating Rink
- Dates: 1 February 2007
- Competitors: 19 from 5 nations

Medalists
gold medal	Lee Kyou-hyuk	South Korea
silver medal	Mun Jun	South Korea
bronze medal	Choi Jae-bong	South Korea
bronze medal	Takaharu Nakajima	Japan

The men's 1000 metres at the 2007 Asian Winter Games was held on 1 February 2007 in Changchun, China.

== Schedule ==
All times are China Standard Time (UTC+08:00)

Date	Time	Event
Thursday, 1 February 2007	16:48	Final

== Records ==
Prior to this competition, the existing world and Games records were as follows.

World Record	Shani Davis (USA)	1:07.03	Salt Lake City, United States	20 November 2005
Games Record	Lee Kyou-hyuk (KOR)	1:13.96	Hachinohe, Japan	5 February 2003

== Results ==
Rank	Pair	Athlete	Time	Notes
1st place, gold medalist(s)	7	Lee Kyou-hyuk (KOR)	1:09.86	GR
2nd place, silver medalist(s)	8	Mun Jun (KOR)	1:10.45	
3rd place, bronze medalist(s)	7	Choi Jae-bong (KOR)	1:10.92	
3rd place, bronze medalist(s)	8	Takaharu Nakajima (JPN)	1:11.35	
5	4	Yu Fengtong (CHN)	1:11.53	
6	9	Gao Xuefeng (CHN)	1:11.86	
6	5	Lee Jong-woo (KOR)	1:11.86	
8	3	An Weijiang (CHN)	1:11.94	
9	4	Zhang Zhongqi (CHN)	1:12.18	
10	10	Hiroyasu Shimizu (JPN)	1:12.68	
11	9	Keiichiro Nagashima (JPN)	1:13.34	
12	6	Vladimir Sherstyuk (KAZ)	1:13.65	
13	10	Alexandr Zhigin (KAZ)	1:13.66	
14	6	Vladimir Kostin (KAZ)	1:14.34	
15	2	Dmitriy Bogdanov (KAZ)	1:16.85	
16	5	Luvsandorjiin Baasan (MGL)	1:23.26	
17	2	Galbaataryn Uuganbaatar (MGL)	1:24.70	
18	3	Oyuundorjiin Enkhbold (MGL)	1:25.27	
19	1	Batsuuriin Bazarsad (MGL)	1:26.08	

- Takaharu Nakajima was awarded bronze because of no three-medal sweep per country rule.
