= Speed skating at the 2007 Asian Winter Games =

- Venue: Jilin Provincial Speed Skating Rink
- Dates: 29 January – 1 February 2007
- Competitors: 71 from 6 nations

Speed skating featured as part of the 2007 Asian Winter Games in the newly constructed Jilin Provincial Speed Skating Rink in Changchun. Ten medal events were contested, with the men's 10000 metres, a part of the Games since 1986, replaced by 100 metres for both genders. Events were held from 29 January to 1 February.

China won the most gold medals, taking five of the ten on offer, by sweeping the women's events. Wang Fei won two gold medals and one silver medal in the three longest distances, while Wang Beixing two gold medals and a silver medal in the three shortest. Japan won the shortest and the longest distance for men, through Yuya Oikawa and Hiroki Hirako, while Lee Kyou-hyuk and Lee Kang-seok of South Korea won the three middle distances.

== Schedule ==
H	Heats	S	Semifinals	F	Finals

Event↓/Date →	29th Mon	30th Tue	31st Wed		1st Thu
Men's 100 m	H		S	F	
Men's 500 m		F			
Men's 1000 m					F
Men's 1500 m			F		
Men's 5000 m	F				
Women's 100 m	H		S	F	
Women's 500 m		F			
Women's 1000 m					F
Women's 1500 m			F		
Women's 3000 m	F				

== Medalists ==
=== Men ===
Event	Gold	Silver	Bronze
100 m	Yuya Oikawa; Japan	Yu Fengtong; China	Lee Kang-seok; South Korea
500 m	Lee Kang-seok; South Korea	Lee Kyou-hyuk; South Korea	Yuya Oikawa; Japan
1000 m	Lee Kyou-hyuk; South Korea	Mun Jun; South Korea	Choi Jae-bong; South Korea
1000 m	Lee Kyou-hyuk; South Korea	Mun Jun; South Korea	Takaharu Nakajima; Japan
1500 m	Lee Kyou-hyuk; South Korea	Gao Xuefeng; China	Mun Jun; South Korea
5000 m	Hiroki Hirako; Japan	Yeo Sang-yeop; South Korea	Dmitriy Babenko; Kazakhstan

=== Women ===
Event	Gold	Silver	Bronze
100 m	Xing Aihua; China	Wang Beixing; China	Lee Sang-hwa; South Korea
500 m	Wang Beixing; China	Lee Sang-hwa; South Korea	Zhang Shuang; China
1000 m	Wang Beixing; China	Wang Fei; China	Ren Hui; China
1000 m	Wang Beixing; China	Wang Fei; China	Kim Yoo-rim; South Korea
1500 m	Wang Fei; China	Lee Ju-yeon; South Korea	Ji Jia; China
3000 m	Wang Fei; China	Masako Hozumi; Japan	Maki Tabata; Japan

== Medal table ==
Rank	Nation	Gold	Silver	Bronze	Total
1	China (CHN)	5	4	3	12
2	South Korea (KOR)	3	5	5	13
3	Japan (JPN)	2	1	3	6
4	Kazakhstan (KAZ)	0	0	1	1
Totals (4 entries)		10	10	12	32

== Participating nations ==
A total of 71 athletes from 6 nations competed in speed skating at the 2007 Asian Winter Games:

- China (17)
- Japan (14)
- Kazakhstan (12)
- Mongolia (6)
- North Korea (2)
- South Korea (20)
