= Speed skating at the 2007 Asian Winter Games – Men's 500 metres =

Men's 500 metres at the 2007 Asian Winter Games
- Venue: Jilin Provincial Speed Skating Rink
- Dates: 30 January 2007
- Competitors: 18 from 5 nations

Medalists
gold medal	Lee Kang-seok	South Korea
silver medal	Lee Kyou-hyuk	South Korea
bronze medal	Yuya Oikawa	Japan

The men's 500 metres at the 2007 Asian Winter Games was held on 30 January 2007 in Changchun, China.

== Schedule ==
All times are China Standard Time (UTC+08:00)

Date	Time	Event
Tuesday, 30 January 2007	16:30	1st race
Tuesday, 30 January 2007	18:15	2nd race

== Records ==
=== 500 meters ===
Prior to this competition, the existing world and Games records were as follows.

World Record	Joji Kato (JPN)	34.30	Salt Lake City, United States	19 November 2005
Games Record	Hiroyasu Shimizu (JPN)	35.56	Hachinohe, Japan	2 February 2003

=== 500 meters × 2 ===
Prior to this competition, the existing world and Games records were as follows.

World Record	Hiroyasu Shimizu (JPN)	1:08.96	Salt Lake City, United States	10 March 2001
Games Record	Hiroyasu Shimizu (JPN)	1:11.37	Hachinohe, Japan	3 February 2003

== Results ==
Legend

- DSQ — Disqualified

Rank	Athlete	1st race		2nd race		Total	Notes
Rank	Athlete	Pair	Time	Pair	Time	Total	Notes
1st place, gold medalist(s)	Lee Kang-seok (KOR)	6	35.11 GR	9	35.19	1:10.30	GR
2nd place, silver medalist(s)	Lee Kyou-hyuk (KOR)	9	35.19	8	35.31	1:10.50	
3rd place, bronze medalist(s)	Yuya Oikawa (JPN)	8	35.52	8	35.36	1:10.88	
4	Joji Kato (JPN)	4	35.36	7	35.64	1:11.00	
5	An Weijiang (CHN)	4	35.49	9	35.58	1:11.07	
6	Lee Ki-ho (KOR)	6	35.62	5	35.49	1:11.11	
7	Yu Fengtong (CHN)	7	35.56	6	35.57	1:11.13	
8	Hiroyasu Shimizu (JPN)	7	35.61	6	35.66	1:11.27	
9	Keiichiro Nagashima (JPN)	9	35.73	4	35.70	1:11.43	
10	Zhang Zhongqi (CHN)	8	36.01	5	35.61	1:11.62	
11	Jiao Yunlong (CHN)	3	35.52	7	36.21	1:11.73	
12	Choi Jae-bong (KOR)	2	36.17	4	35.94	1:12.11	
13	Vladimir Sherstyuk (KAZ)	2	37.35	3	37.17	1:14.52	
14	Sergey Andreyev (KAZ)	3	38.11	3	38.07	1:16.18	
15	Oyuundorjiin Enkhbold (MGL)	5	41.84	2	41.81	1:23.65	
16	Batsuuriin Bazarsad (MGL)	1	42.10	2	41.76	1:23.86	
17	Galbaataryn Uuganbaatar (MGL)	1	42.20	1	42.82	1:25.02	
—	Dmitriy Bogdanov (KAZ)	5	DSQ			DSQ	
