= Speed skating at the 2007 Asian Winter Games – Men's 1500 metres =

Men's 1500 metres at the 2007 Asian Winter Games
- Venue: Jilin Provincial Speed Skating Rink
- Dates: 31 January 2007
- Competitors: 15 from 5 nations

Medalists
gold medal	Lee Kyou-hyuk	South Korea
silver medal	Gao Xuefeng	China
bronze medal	Mun Jun	South Korea

The men's 1500 metres at the 2007 Asian Winter Games was held on 31 January 2007 in Changchun, China.

== Schedule ==
All times are China Standard Time (UTC+08:00)

Date	Time	Event
Wednesday, 31 January 2007	16:55	Final

== Records ==
Prior to this competition, the existing world and Games records were as follows.

World Record	Shani Davis (USA)	1:42.68	Calgary, Canada	19 March 2006
Games Record	Lee Kyou-hyuk (KOR)	1:54.65	Hachinohe, Japan	3 February 2003

== Results ==
Rank	Pair	Athlete	Time	Notes
1st place, gold medalist(s)	7	Lee Kyou-hyuk (KOR)	1:49.13	GR
2nd place, silver medalist(s)	5	Gao Xuefeng (CHN)	1:49.24	
3rd place, bronze medalist(s)	8	Mun Jun (KOR)	1:49.79	
4	8	Choi Jae-bong (KOR)	1:50.21	
5	3	Takaharu Nakajima (JPN)	1:52.20	
6	7	Vladimir Kostin (KAZ)	1:53.08	
7	4	Dmitriy Babenko (KAZ)	1:53.24	
8	1	Chang Rui (CHN)	1:53.76	
9	6	Alexandr Zhigin (KAZ)	1:54.20	
10	2	Zheng Jinze (CHN)	1:55.74	
11	4	Sergey Andreyev (KAZ)	1:57.57	
12	6	Cheng Yue (CHN)	1:58.00	
13	2	Luvsandorjiin Baasan (MGL)	2:07.82	
14	3	Galbaataryn Uuganbaatar (MGL)	2:09.14	
15	5	Lee Jong-woo (KOR)	3:00.22	
