= Speed skating at the 2007 Asian Winter Games – Men's 100 metres =

Men's 100 metres at the 2007 Asian Winter Games
- Venue: Jilin Provincial Speed Skating Rink
- Dates: 29–31 January 2007
- Competitors: 12 from 5 nations

Medalists
gold medal	Yuya Oikawa	Japan
silver medal	Yu Fengtong	China
bronze medal	Lee Kang-seok	South Korea

The men's 100 metres at the 2007 Asian Winter Games was held on 29 and 31 January 2007 in Changchun, China.

== Schedule ==
All times are China Standard Time (UTC+08:00)

Date	Time	Event
Monday, 29 January 2007	12:55	Preliminary
Wednesday, 31 January 2007	18:06	Semifinals
Wednesday, 31 January 2007	18:30	Finals

== Records ==
Prior to this competition, the existing world and Games records were as follows.

World Record	Hiroyasu Shimizu (JPN)	9.43	Salt Lake City, United States	13 December 2003
Games Record	—	—	—	—

== Results ==
Legend

- DSQ — Disqualified

=== Preliminary ===
Rank	Athlete	Time	Notes
1	Lee Kang-seok (KOR)	9.64	GR
2	Yuya Oikawa (JPN)	9.71	
3	Jiao Yunlong (CHN)	9.76	
3	Yu Fengtong (CHN)	9.76	
5	An Weijiang (CHN)	9.78	
6	Joji Kato (JPN)	9.82	
7	Zhang Zhongqi (CHN)	9.95	
8	Lee Ki-ho (KOR)	10.09	
9	Kwon Soon-chun (KOR)	10.11	
10	Vladimir Sherstyuk (KAZ)	10.16	
11	Batsuuriin Bazarsad (MGL)	11.34	
—	Oyuundorjiin Enkhbold (MGL)	DSQ	

=== Semifinals ===
==== Heat 1 ====
Rank	Athlete	Time	Notes
1	Lee Kang-seok (KOR)	9.67	
2	Zhang Zhongqi (CHN)	9.89	
3	Joji Kato (JPN)	9.94	

==== Heat 2 ====
Rank	Athlete	Time	Notes
1	Yuya Oikawa (JPN)	9.66	
2	An Weijiang (CHN)	9.68	
3	Lee Ki-ho (KOR)	9.69	

==== Heat 3 ====
Rank	Athlete	Time	Notes
1	Yu Fengtong (CHN)	9.68	
2	Jiao Yunlong (CHN)	9.90	
3	Kwon Soon-chun (KOR)	10.13	

=== Finals ===
==== Final C ====
Rank	Athlete	Time	Notes
1	Joji Kato (JPN)	10.00	
2	Lee Ki-ho (KOR)	10.30	
3	Kwon Soon-chun (KOR)	10.50	

==== Final B ====
Rank	Athlete	Time	Notes
1	Zhang Zhongqi (CHN)	9.82	
2	An Weijiang (CHN)	9.84	
3	Jiao Yunlong (CHN)	9.99	

==== Final A ====
Rank	Athlete	Time	Notes
1st place, gold medalist(s)	Yuya Oikawa (JPN)	9.59	GR
2nd place, silver medalist(s)	Yu Fengtong (CHN)	9.68	
3rd place, bronze medalist(s)	Lee Kang-seok (KOR)	9.69	
