= Speed skating at the 2007 Asian Winter Games – Men's 5000 metres =

Men's 5000 metres at the 2007 Asian Winter Games
- Venue: Jilin Provincial Speed Skating Rink
- Dates: 29 January 2007
- Competitors: 12 from 5 nations

Medalists
gold medal	Hiroki Hirako	Japan
silver medal	Yeo Sang-yeop	South Korea
bronze medal	Dmitriy Babenko	Kazakhstan

The men's 5000 metres at the 2007 Asian Winter Games was held on 29 January 2007 in Changchun, China.

== Schedule ==
All times are China Standard Time (UTC+08:00)

Date	Time	Event
Monday, 29 January 2007	11:00	Final

== Records ==
Prior to this competition, the existing world and Games records were as follows.

World Record	Sven Kramer (NED)	6:08.78	Salt Lake City, United States	19 November 2005
Games Record	Mitsuru Watanabe (JPN)	7:03.99	Harbin, China	5 February 1996

== Results ==
Rank	Pair	Athlete	Time	Notes
1st place, gold medalist(s)	6	Hiroki Hirako (JPN)	6:39.71	GR
2nd place, silver medalist(s)	4	Yeo Sang-yeop (KOR)	6:43.34	
3rd place, bronze medalist(s)	6	Dmitriy Babenko (KAZ)	6:43.40	
4	3	Choi Kwun-won (KOR)	6:43.86	
5	5	Gao Xuefeng (CHN)	6:44.13	
6	3	Song Xingyu (CHN)	6:47.37	
7	4	Kesato Miyazaki (JPN)	6:47.90	
8	2	Ko Byung-wook (KOR)	6:54.23	
9	1	Dmitriy Obaturov (KAZ)	7:00.77	
10	5	Alexey Belyayev (KAZ)	7:08.67	
11	2	Galbaataryn Uuganbaatar (MGL)	7:39.94	
12	1	Luvsandorjiin Baasan (MGL)	7:43.25	
