= Speed skating at the 2007 Asian Winter Games – Women's 100 metres =

Olympic event, one of the many games, are held as sporting events every 4 years

Women's 100 metres at the 2007 Asian Winter Games
- Venue: Jilin Provincial Speed Skating Rink
- Dates: 29–31 January 2007
- Competitors: 11 from 4 nations

Medalists
gold medal	Xing Aihua	China
silver medal	Wang Beixing	China
bronze medal	Lee Sang-hwa	South Korea

The women's 100 metres at the 2007 Asian Winter Games was held on 29 and 31 January 2007 in Changchun, China.

== Schedule ==
All times are China Standard Time (UTC+08:00)

Date	Time	Event
Monday, 29 January 2007	12:40	Preliminary
Wednesday, 31 January 2007	18:00	Semifinals
Wednesday, 31 January 2007	18:30	Finals

== Records ==
Prior to this competition, the existing world and Games records were as follows.

World Record	Svetlana Zhurova (RUS)	10.31	Salt Lake City, United States	10 January 2003
Games Record	—	—	—	—

== Results ==
=== Preliminary ===
Rank	Athlete	Time	Notes
1	Wang Beixing (CHN)	10.41	GR
2	Xing Aihua (CHN)	10.49	
2	Sayuri Osuga (JPN)	10.49	
4	Lee Sang-hwa (KOR)	10.55	
5	Shihomi Shinya (JPN)	10.57	
6	Zhang Shuang (CHN)	10.62	
7	Ren Hui (CHN)	10.77	
8	Choi Seung-yong (KOR)	10.89	
9	Ko Hyon-suk (PRK)	10.95	
10	Oh Min-ji (KOR)	11.00	
11	Lee Bo-ra (KOR)	11.03	

=== Semifinals ===
==== Heat 1 ====
Rank	Athlete	Time	Notes
1	Wang Beixing (CHN)	10.39	GR
2	Zhang Shuang (CHN)	10.76	
3	Ren Hui (CHN)	11.05	

==== Heat 2 ====
Rank	Athlete	Time	Notes
1	Xing Aihua (CHN)	10.38	GR
2	Shihomi Shinya (JPN)	10.44	
3	Choi Seung-yong (KOR)	10.95	

==== Heat 3 ====
Rank	Athlete	Time	Notes
1	Lee Sang-hwa (KOR)	10.40	
2	Sayuri Osuga (JPN)	10.45	
3	Ko Hyon-suk (PRK)	11.37	

=== Finals ===
==== Final C ====
Rank	Athlete	Time	Notes
1	Ren Hui (CHN)	10.95	
2	Choi Seung-yong (KOR)	10.96	
3	Ko Hyon-suk (PRK)	11.16	

==== Final B ====
Rank	Athlete	Time	Notes
1	Shihomi Shinya (JPN)	10.56	
2	Sayuri Osuga (JPN)	10.70	
3	Zhang Shuang (CHN)	10.74	

==== Final A ====
Rank	Athlete	Time	Notes
1st place, gold medalist(s)	Xing Aihua (CHN)	10.41	
2nd place, silver medalist(s)	Wang Beixing (CHN)	10.44	
3rd place, bronze medalist(s)	Lee Sang-hwa (KOR)	10.59	
