= Speed skating at the 2007 Asian Winter Games – Women's 3000 metres =

Women's 3000 metres at the 2007 Asian Winter Games
- Venue: Jilin Provincial Speed Skating Rink
- Dates: 29 January 2007
- Competitors: 12 from 4 nations

Medalists
gold medal	Wang Fei	China
silver medal	Masako Hozumi	Japan
bronze medal	Maki Tabata	Japan

The women's 3000 metres at the 2007 Asian Winter Games was held on 29 January 2007 in Changchun, China.

== Schedule ==
All times are China Standard Time (UTC+08:00)

Date	Time	Event
Monday, 29 January 2007	10:00	Final

== Records ==
Prior to this competition, the existing world and Games records were as follows.

World Record	Cindy Klassen (CAN)	3:53.34	Calgary, Canada	18 March 2006
Games Record	Lyudmila Prokasheva (KAZ)	4:25.98	Harbin, China	5 February 1996

== Results ==
Rank	Pair	Athlete	Time	Notes
1st place, gold medalist(s)	6	Wang Fei (CHN)	4:13.08	GR
2nd place, silver medalist(s)	3	Masako Hozumi (JPN)	4:15.42	
3rd place, bronze medalist(s)	4	Maki Tabata (JPN)	4:17.00	
4	4	Lee Ju-yeon (KOR)	4:18.05	
5	5	Noh Seon-yeong (KOR)	4:18.57	
6	3	Eriko Ishino (JPN)	4:19.02	
7	5	Ji Jia (CHN)	4:19.44	
8	6	Gao Yang (CHN)	4:24.29	
9	2	Lee So-yeon (KOR)	4:27.81	
10	1	Natalya Rybakova (KAZ)	4:28.40	
11	2	Anzhelika Gavrilova (KAZ)	4:38.44	
12	1	Yelena Obaturova (KAZ)	4:40.36	
