= 2010 World Sprint Speed Skating Championships =

International speed skating competition

World Sprint Speed Skating Championships
- Speedskating rink
- Venue: Meiji Hokkaido-Tokachi Oval (Obihiro, Hokkaidō)
- Dates: 16 and 17 January 2010

Medalist men
1st place, gold medalist(s)		Lee Kyou-hyuk	KOR
2nd place, silver medalist(s)		Lee Kang-seok	KOR
3rd place, bronze medalist(s)		Keiichiro Nagashima	JPN

Medalist women
1st place, gold medalist(s)		Lee Sang-hwa	KOR
2nd place, silver medalist(s)		Sayuri Yoshii	JPN
3rd place, bronze medalist(s)		Jenny Wolf	GER

The 2010 World Sprint Speed Skating Championships was held between 16 January and 17 January 2010 at the Meiji Hokkaido-Tokachi Oval in Obihiro, Hokkaidō.

== Men championships ==
=== Results ===
Rank	Name	Nation	500 m (1)	1000 m (1)	500 m (2)	1000 m (2)	Total	Behind
1st place, gold medalist(s)	Lee Kyou-hyuk	South Korea	35.22	1:09.44	35.17	1:09.60	139.910	
2nd place, silver medalist(s)	Lee Kang-seok	South Korea	35.15	1:10.85	35.11	1:10.39	140.880	+0.97
3rd place, bronze medalist(s)	Keiichiro Nagashima	Japan	35.01	1:10.99	35.19	1:10.73	141.060	+1.15
4	Ronald Mulder	Netherlands	35.24	1:10.48	35.55	1:10.36	141.210	+1.30
5	Dmitry Lobkov	Russia	35.50	1:10.23	35.56	1:10.57	141.460	+1.55
6	Mika Poutala	Finland	35.26	1:11.04	35.32	1:10.84	141.520	+1.61
7	Beorn Nijenhuis	Netherlands	35.66	1:09.73	35.74	1:10.56	141.545	+1.64
8	Lars Elgersma	Netherlands	35.75	1:10.81	35.70	1:09.73	141.720	+1.81
9	Tadashi Obara	Japan	35.44	1:11.46	35.57	1:10.64	142.060	+2.15
10	Ryohei Haga	Japan	35.68	1:11.01	35.61	1:12.13	142.860	+2.95
11	Maciej Ustynowicz	Poland	35.71	1:11.95	35.68	1:11.06	142.895	+2.99
12	Aleksey Yesin	Russia	35.97	1:11.04	36.11	1:10.82	143.010	+3.10
13	Nico Ihle	Germany	35.66	1:11.47	35.88	1:11.51	143.030	+3.12
14	Joey Lindsey	United States	35.79	1:11.59	35.82	1:11.61	143.210	+3.30
15	Zhang Zhongqi	China	35.52	1:12.40	35.55	1:12.06	143.300	+3.39
16	Samuel Schwarz	Germany	35.75	1:10.20	35.78	1:13.74	143.500	+3.59
17	Tyler Derraugh	Canada	36.05	1:11.63	36.17	1:11.39	143.730	+3.82
18	Dag-Erik Kleven	Norway	35.84	1:12.51	36.17	1:11.44	143.985	+4.08
19	Ermanno Ioriatti	Italy	35.96	1:11.97	36.14	1:11.82	143.995	+4.09
20	Christoffer Fagerli Rukke	Norway	36.29	1:10.62	37.03	1:11.14	144.200	+4.29
21	Parker Vance	United States	35.62	1:13.15	35.90	1:12.57	144.380	+4.47
22	Yu Fengtong	China	36.07	1:12.96	35.41	1:12.87	144.395	+4.49
23	Jörg Dallmann	Germany	36.69	1:12.06	36.77	1:12.01	145.495	+5.59
24	Denis Kuzin	Kazakhstan	37.03	1:11.44	36.88	1:12.03	145.645	+5.74
NQ25	Aleksandr Lebedev	Russia	36.10	1:11.83	36.12			
NQ26	Roman Krech	Kazakhstan	36.13	1:12.10	36.04			
NQ27	Vincent Labrie	Canada	36.10	1:13.32	36.12			
NQ28	Tuomas Nieminen	Finland	36.48	1:12.41	36.22			
NQ29	James-Clay Cholewinski	United States	36.42	1:12.30	36.57			
NQ30	Maciej Biega	Poland	36.39	1:13.05	36.42			
NQ31	Espen-Aarnes Hvammen	Norway	36.55	1:12.72	36.53			
NQ32	Pascal Briand	France	37.50	1:12.59	37.34			
NQ33	Daniel Greig	Australia	37.16	1:13.66	37.57			
NQ34	Marius Paraschivoiu	Romania	37.14	1:14.59	37.59			
NQ35	Jose Ignacio Fazio	Argentina	37.72	1:15.33	37.97			
NQ36	Matthew McLean	Canada	1:11.21	1:12.13	36.01			
NQ37	Pekka Koskela	Finland	36.15	1:13.19	RET			
NQ38	William Dutton	Canada	36.08	DQ	36.29			
NQ39	Mun Jun	South Korea	35.86	1:17.50	NS			

NQ = Not qualified for the second 1000 m (only the best 24 are qualified)
DQ = disqualified
NS = Not Started
RET = Retreted

== Women championships ==
=== Results ===
Rank	Name	Nation	500 m (1)	1000 m (1)	500 m (2)	1000 m (2)	Total	Behind
1st place, gold medalist(s)	Lee Sang-hwa	South Korea	38.19	1:17.84	38.37	1:18.26	154.580	
2nd place, silver medalist(s)	Sayuri Yoshii	Japan	38.74	1:17.26	38.92	1:17.08	154.830	+0.25
3rd place, bronze medalist(s)	Jenny Wolf	Germany	38.31	1:18.32	38.24	1:18.80	155.110	+0.53
4	Nao Kodaira	Japan	38.75	1:17.64	39.11	1:17.99	155.675	+1.10
5	Yekaterina Malysheva	Russia	39.02	1:18.31	39.49	1:17.50	156.415	+1.84
6	Yu Jing	China	38.84	1:18.67	39.18	1:18.38	156.545	+1.97
6	Jin Peiyu	China	39.15	1:18.37	38.94	1:18.54	156.545	+1.97
8	Olga Fatkulina	Russia	39.20	1:18.40	39.15	1:18.20	156.650	+2.07
9	Tomomi Okazaki	Japan	38.99	1:19.31	38.88	1:18.82	156.935	+2.36
10	Shihomi Shinya	Japan	39.02	1:18.47	39.31	1:19.02	157.075	+2.50
11	Yuliya Nemaya	Russia	39.08	1:19.90	38.79	1:18.55	157.095	+2.52
12	Zhang Shuang	China	39.54	1:19.08	38.68	1:19.37	157.445	+2.87
13	Sophie Nijman	Netherlands	39.64	1:18.11	39.66	1:18.36	157.535	+2.96
14	Sanne van der Star	Netherlands	39.43	1:18.65	39.68	1:18.71	157.790	+3.21
15	Lotte van Beek	Netherlands	39.80	1:17.83	39.98	1:18.24	157.815	+3.24
16	Ren Hui	China	39.33	1:19.07	39.32	1:19.42	157.895	+3.32
17	Chiara Simionato	Italy	39.71	1:19.31	39.85	1:18.55	158.490	+3.91
18	Lee Bo-ra	South Korea	39.46	1:19.81	39.35	1:19.84	158.680	+4.10
19	Tamara Oudenaarden	Canada	39.21	1:19.42	40.23	1:19.60	158.950	+4.37
20	Sophie Muir	Australia	39.78	1:19.81	39.74	1:19.27	159.060	+4.48
21	Ingeborg Kroon	Netherlands	39.99	1:18.89	40.20	1:19.17	159.220	+4.64
22	Heike Hartmann	Germany	39.80	1:19.18	40.01	1:19.84	159.320	+4.74
23	Anastasia Bucsis	Canada	39.53	1:20.19	39.97	1:19.95	159.570	+4.99
24	Daniela Dumitru	Romania	41.18	1:21.73	41.12	1:22.56	164.445	+9.87
NQ25	Jennifer Alexa Caicedo	Argentina	41.53	1:24.17	41.88			
NQ26	Olena Myahkikh	Ukraine	42.49	1:23.85	42.01			
NQ27	Monique Angermüller	Germany	DQ	1:17.59	39.46			
NQ28	Judith Hesse	Germany	39.65	1:19.66				

NQ = Not qualified for the second 1000 m (only the best 24 are qualified)
DQ = disqualified

== Rules ==
All participating skaters are allowed to skate the two 500 meters and one 1000 meters; 24 skaters may take part on the second 1000 meters. These 24 skaters are determined by the samalog standings after the three skated distances, and comparing these lists as follows:

1. Skaters among the top 24 on both lists are qualified.
2. To make up a total of 24, skaters are then added in order of their best rank on either list.
