= China at the 2010 Winter Olympics =

- IOC code: CHN
- NOC: Chinese Olympic Committee
- Website: www.olympic.cn (in Chinese and English)

in Vancouver
- Competitors: 94 in 10 sports
- Flag bearers: Han Xiaopeng (opening); Shen Xue, Zhao Hongbo (closing)
- Medals Ranked 7th: Gold 5 Silver 2 Bronze 4 Total 11

Winter Olympics appearances (overview)
- 1980; 1984; 1988; 1992; 1994; 1998; 2002; 2006; 2010; 2014; 2018; 2022; 2026

China participated at the 2010 Winter Olympics in Vancouver, British Columbia, Canada, sending its largest delegation at a Winter Olympics with 94 athletes. China had its best ever Winter Olympics medal finish, winning five gold medals and eleven in total, finishing seventh in the medal standings.

China won its first ever gold medal in figure skating when Shen Xue and Zhao Hongbo set a new world record for the overall combined score in pair figure skating. It was the first time since 1960 that a Russian, Soviet, or Unified Team flagged team did not win the gold medal. China also won its first ever team Winter Olympic medal in the women's curling event with a bronze. The women's short track speed skating team swept the gold medals in all four events. China also won three medals in freestyle skiing aerials.

Wang Meng won three gold medals in short track speed skating and became the most decorated Chinese Winter Olympics athlete ever. Zhou Yang won two gold medals at these Games.

Xiao Tian, deputy chef de mission of the Chinese delegation, described the outcome as an "important breakthrough" for China in winter sports.

== Target ==
At the 2006 Winter Olympics in Turin, 76 athletes competed in 48 events within nine disciplines and won two gold, four silver and five bronze medals. In an attempt to surpass that achievement, China sent 94 athletes to Vancouver, its largest delegation ever (record broken by the Chinese delegation at their home olympics - Beijing 2022).

According to He Zhenliang, China's senior International Olympic Committee member and the honorary president of the Chinese Olympic Committee, the insufficient participation in Winter Olympic sports by "ordinary [Chinese] people" is still limiting the country's success in the Winter Games and is also discouraging any attempt to bid to host a future Winter Olympics.

They've got an endless supply of money and endless supply of bodies, and that's a pretty good thing to have in any sport.

— U.S. aerials coach Matt Christensen, on the Chinese aerials team

The Chinese Olympic Committee had high expectations in particular for the country's men's and women's aerials teams; in 2003 they hired two coaches, American Peter Judge and Canadian Dustin Wilson, to lead an effort to revamp China's aerial training program, and by January 2010, the top four women and five of the top seven men in the sport were Chinese. Only two teams—those from China and the United States—qualified four male and four female skiers in the event. Aerials skier Han Xiaopeng, winner of the gold medal in his sport at the 2006 Olympics in Turin, was chosen as China's national flag bearer for the 2010 opening ceremony.

One potential competitor, speed skater Wang Manli, the 2006 silver medal winner at 500 metres, vowed in January 2007 to win gold in 2010, however, a chronic knee injury forced her to announce retirement in early 2008.

== Records ==
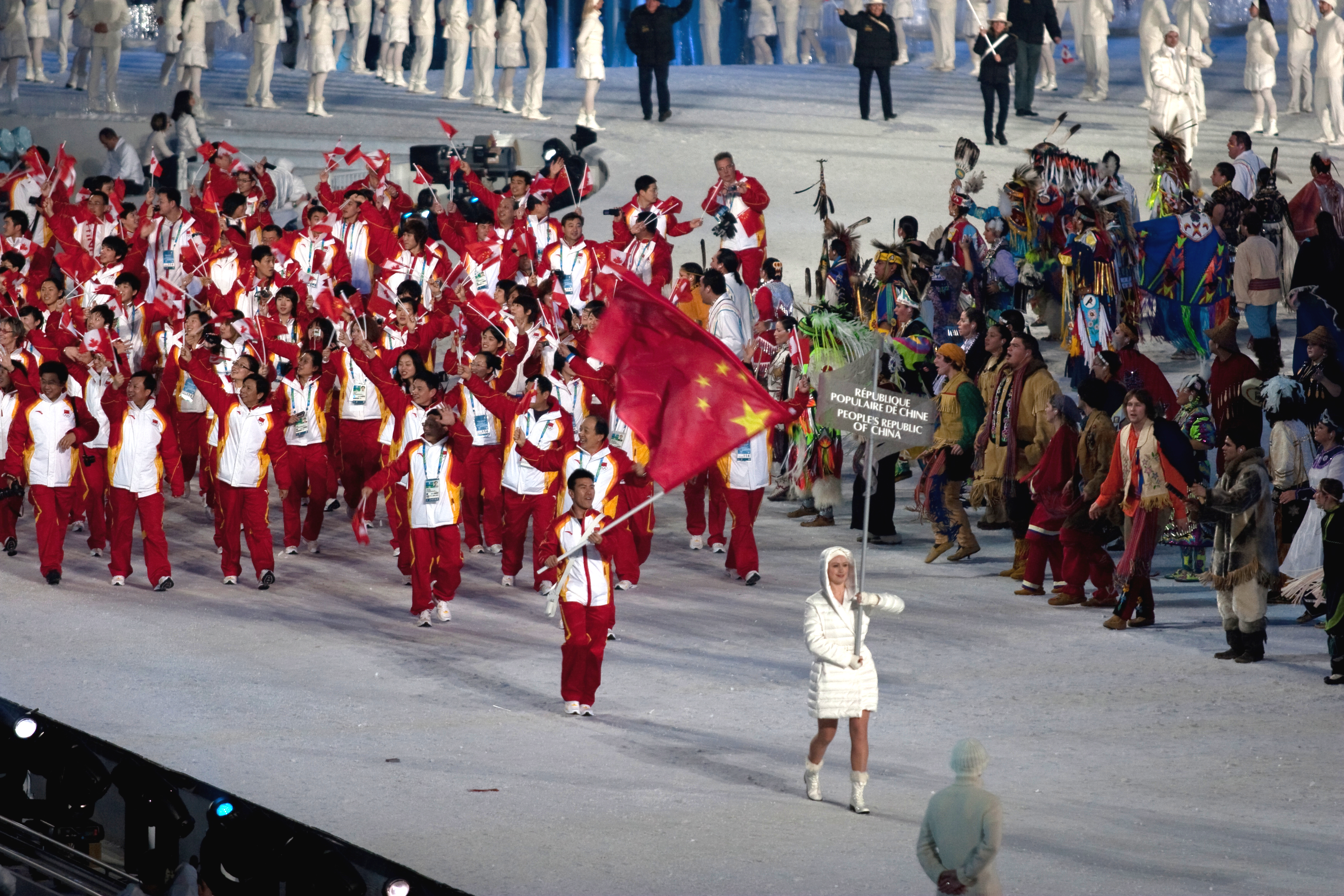
The athletes entering the stadium during the opening ceremonies.

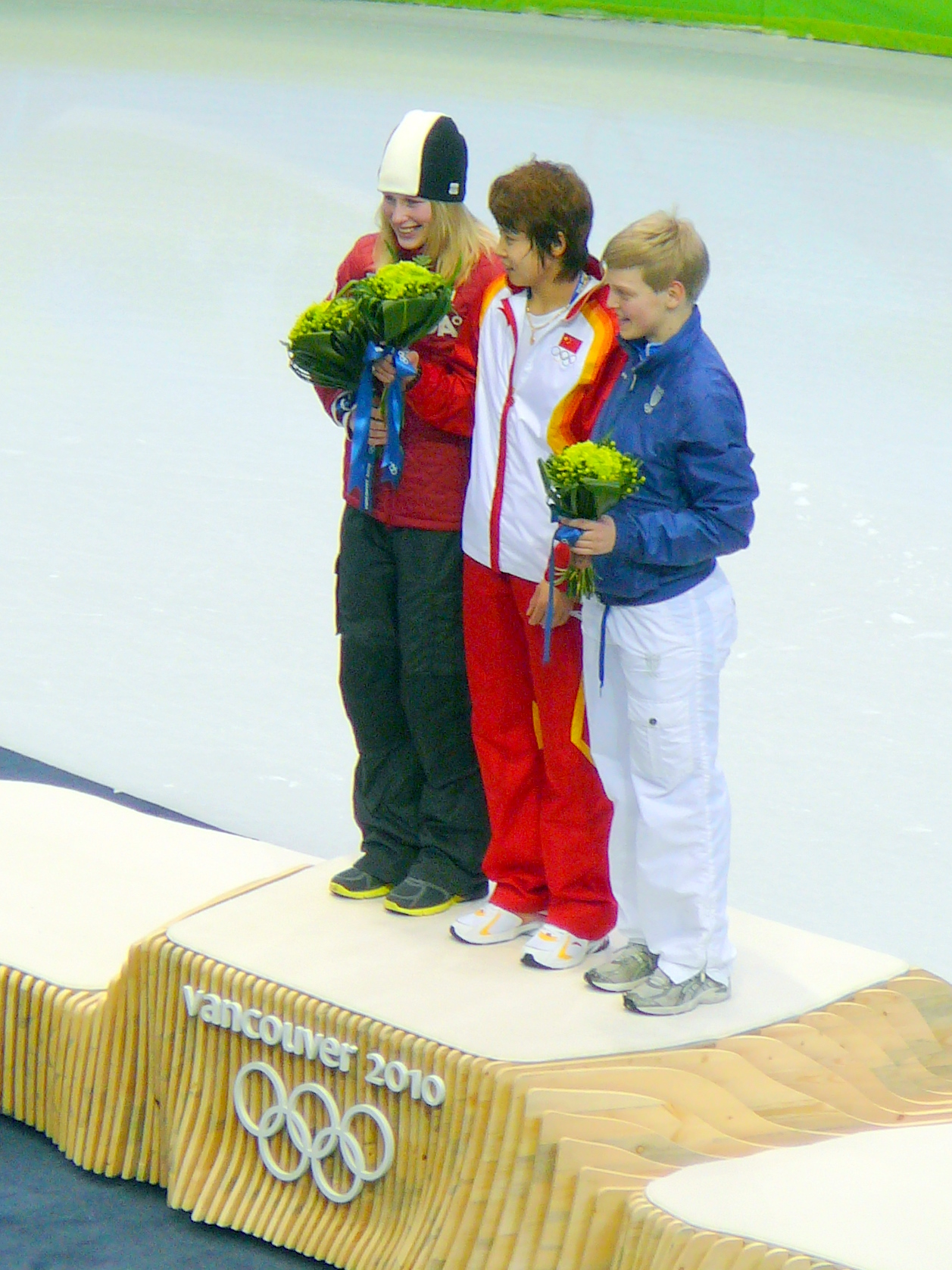
Wang Meng (centre) at the medal presentation for the 500 metres.

In the sport of figure skating, Shen Xue and Zhao Hongbo set a new world record for the overall combined score of 216.57 points in pair figure skating. It was the first time since 1960 that a Russian, Soviet, or Unified Team flagged team did not win the gold medal. Shen and Zhao set a new world record for the short program with 76.66 points. Meanwhile, in the same event, the pair skating team of Pang Qing and Tong Jian set a new world record for the free skate with a score of 141.81 points.

Wang Meng and Zhou Yang set Olympic records in the 500 m and 1,500 m short track speed skating events. China set a new world record in the 3000 metre relay race. Zhou Yang also set a new world record in the 1,000 m event.

== Medalists ==
The following Chinese athletes won medals at the games:

Medal	Name	Sport	Event	Date
Gold	Shen Xue / Zhao Hongbo	Figure skating	Pair skating	Feb 15
Gold	Wang Meng	Short track speed skating	Women's 500 metres	Feb 17
Gold	Zhou Yang	Short track speed skating	Women's 1500 metres	Feb 20
Gold	Sun Linlin / Wang Meng / Zhang Hui / Zhou Yang	Short track speed skating	Women's 3000 metre relay	Feb 24
Gold	Wang Meng	Short track speed skating	Women's 1000 metres	Feb 26
Silver	Pang Qing / Tong Jian	Figure skating	Pair skating	Feb 15
Silver	Li Nina	Freestyle skiing	Women's aerials	Feb 24
Bronze	Wang Beixing	Speed skating	Women's 500 metres	Feb 16
Bronze	Guo Xinxin	Freestyle skiing	Women's aerials	Feb 24
Bronze	Liu Zhongqing	Freestyle skiing	Men's aerials	Feb 25
Bronze	Wang Bingyu / Liu Yin / Yue Qingshuang / Zhou Yan / Liu Jinli	Curling	Women's	Feb 26

Medals by sport
Sport	Gold medal	Silver medal	Bronze medal	Total
Short track speed skating	4	0	0	4
Figure skating	1	1	0	2
Freestyle skiing	0	1	2	3
Curling	0	0	1	1
Speed skating	0	0	1	1
Total	5	2	4	11

Medals by date						Cumulative			
Day	Date	Gold medal	Silver medal	Bronze medal	Total	Gold medal	Silver medal	Bronze medal	Total
Day 1	13th	0	0	0	0	0	0	0	0
Day 2	14th	0	0	0	0	0	0	0	0
Day 3	15th	1	1	0	2	1	1	0	2
Day 4	16th	0	0	1	1	1	1	1	3
Day 5	17th	1	0	0	1	2	1	1	4
Day 6	18th	0	0	0	0	2	1	1	4
Day 7	19th	0	0	0	0	2	1	1	4
Day 8	20th	1	0	0	1	3	1	1	5
Day 9	21st	0	0	0	0	3	1	1	5
Day 10	22nd	0	0	0	0	3	1	1	5
Day 11	23rd	0	0	0	0	3	1	1	5
Day 12	24th	1	1	1	3	4	2	2	8
Day 13	25th	0	0	1	1	4	2	3	9
Day 14	26th	1	0	1	2	5	2	4	11
Day 15	27th	0	0	0	0	5	2	4	11
Day 16	28th	0	0	0	0	5	2	4	11
Total		5	2	4	11	5	2	4	11

Multiple medalists
Name	Sport	Gold medal	Silver medal	Bronze medal	Total
Wang Meng	Short track speed skating	3	0	0	3
Zhou Yang	Short track speed skating	2	0	0	2

== Alpine skiing ==
Men

Athlete	Event	Run 1	Run 2	Total	Rank
Li Lei	Giant slalom	1:30.36	1:36.90	3:07.26	75
Li Lei	Slalom	59.43	1:01.43	2:00.86	43

Women

Athlete	Event	Run 1	Run 2	Total	Rank
Xia Lina	Giant slalom	1:30.41	1:28.48	2:58.89	59
Xia Lina	Slalom	1:10.60	Did not finish		

== Biathlon ==
Men

Athlete	Event	Time	Rank
Zhang Chengye	20 km individual	51:31.0	19
Zhang Chengye	10 km sprint	26:19.9	32
Zhang Chengye	12.5 km pursuit	36:28.7	35

Women

Athlete	Event	Time	Rank
Song Chaoqing	15 km individual	46:30.3	53
Song Chaoqing	7.5 km sprint	21:38.2	32
Song Chaoqing	10 km pursuit	34:46.6	43
Wang Chunli	15 km individual	44:18.0	33
Wang Chunli	7.5 km sprint	22:13.4	50
Wang Chunli	10 km pursuit	34:01.8	35
Liu Xianying	15 km individual	43:16.2	20
Liu Xianying	7.5 km sprint	22:14.6	51
Liu Xianying	10 km pursuit	33:41.2	30
Kong Yingchao	15 km individual	46:46.2	58
Kong Yingchao	7.5 km sprint	22:30.9	61
Wang Chunli; Liu Xianying; Kong Yingchao; Song Chaoqing	4 x 6 km relay	1:12:16.9	9
Liu Yuanyuan	No show		

== Cross-country skiing ==
Men

Athlete	Event	Qualifying		Quarterfinals		Semifinals		Final	
Athlete	Event	Time	Rank	Time	Rank	Time	Rank	Time	Rank
Xu Wenlong	15 km freestyle							37:39.5	68
Sun Qinghai	Sprint classic	3:38.52	12	3:43.1	5	Did not advance			
Sun Qinghai; Xu Wenlong	Team sprint free	19:43.6	10	Did not advance					

Women

Athlete	Event	Qualifying		Quarterfinals		Semifinals		Final	
Athlete	Event	Time	Rank	Time	Rank	Time	Rank	Time	Rank
Li Hongxue	10 km freestyle							27:05.7	35
Li Hongxue	15 km pursuit							43:24.3	37
Li Xin	10 km freestyle							29:38.5	65
Man Dandan	Sprint classic	4:08.55	51	Did not advance					
Man Dandan; Li Hongxue	Team sprint free	20:02.7	9	Did not advance					

== Curling ==
=== Men's tournament ===
Standings

Final round robin standings
Team	Skip	Pld	W	L	PF	PA	EW	EL	BE	SE	S%	Qualification
Canada	Kevin Martin	9	9	0	75	36	36	28	14	2	85%	Playoffs
Norway	Thomas Ulsrud	9	7	2	64	43	40	32	15	7	84%	Playoffs
Switzerland	Ralph Stöckli	9	6	3	53	44	35	33	20	8	81%	Playoffs
Sweden	Niklas Edin	9	5	4	50	52	34	36	20	6	82%	Tiebreaker
Great Britain	David Murdoch	9	5	4	57	44	35	29	20	9	81%	Tiebreaker
Germany	Andy Kapp	9	4	5	48	60	35	38	11	9	75%	
France	Thomas Dufour	9	3	6	37	63	22	34	16	7	73%	
China	Wang Fengchun	9	2	7	52	60	37	37	9	7	77%	
Denmark	Ulrik Schmidt	9	2	7	45	63	31	29	12	6	78%	
United States	John Shuster	9	2	7	43	59	32	41	18	9	76%	

Team

Name	Position
Wang Fengchun*	Skip
Liu Rui	Fourth
Xu Xiaoming	Second
Li Hongchen	Lead
Zang Jialiang	Alternate

*Throws third rocks

Round-robin

Draw 2

Sheet B	1	2	3	4	5	6	7	8	9	10	Final
China (Wang) 🔨	0	0	0	1	0	0	3	0	1	0	5
France (Dufour)	1	0	0	0	1	2	0	0	0	2	6

Draw 3

Sheet C	1	2	3	4	5	6	7	8	9	10	Final
Denmark (Schmidt) 🔨	0	1	0	0	0	0	0	x	x	x	1
China (Wang)	1	0	3	2	1	0	1	x	x	x	8

Draw 5

Sheet A	1	2	3	4	5	6	7	8	9	10	11	Final
Sweden (Edin)	0	1	0	0	0	2	0	1	1	0	1	6
China (Wang) 🔨	1	0	1	1	0	0	1	0	0	1	0	5

Draw 6

Sheet D	1	2	3	4	5	6	7	8	9	10	Final
Norway (Ulsrud) 🔨	1	0	1	0	0	1	0	2	0	2	7
China (Wang)	0	1	0	1	0	0	1	0	2	0	5

Draw 7

Sheet C	1	2	3	4	5	6	7	8	9	10	Final
China (Wang)	0	0	1	0	1	0	0	2	0	x	4
Great Britain (Murdoch) 🔨	1	0	0	2	0	3	2	0	1	x	9

Draw 8

Sheet B	1	2	3	4	5	6	7	8	9	10	Final
Switzerland (Stöckli)	0	0	2	0	3	0	2	0	2	x	9
China (Wang) 🔨	0	1	0	2	0	1	0	1	0	x	5

Draw 10

Sheet C	1	2	3	4	5	6	7	8	9	10	Final
Germany (Kapp) 🔨	0	0	1	0	2	1	0	2	0	1	7
China (Wang)	2	1	0	1	0	0	1	0	1	0	6

Draw 11

Sheet D	1	2	3	4	5	6	7	8	9	10	Final
China (Li) 🔨	3	0	1	1	0	0	3	0	3	x	11
United States (Shuster)	0	2	0	0	1	1	0	1	0	x	5

Draw 12

Sheet A	1	2	3	4	5	6	7	8	9	10	Final
China (Li)	0	1	0	1	0	1	0	x	x	x	3
Canada (Martin) 🔨	4	0	1	0	1	0	4	x	x	x	10

=== Women's tournament ===
Standings

Final round robin standings
Team	Skip	Pld	W	L	PF	PA	EW	EL	BE	SE	S%	Qualification
Canada	Cheryl Bernard	9	8	1	56	37	40	29	20	13	81%	Playoffs
Sweden	Anette Norberg	9	7	2	56	52	36	36	13	5	79%	Playoffs
China	Wang Bingyu	9	6	3	61	47	39	37	12	7	74%	Playoffs
Switzerland	Mirjam Ott	9	6	3	67	48	40	36	7	12	76%	Playoffs
Denmark	Angelina Jensen	9	4	5	49	61	31	40	15	5	74%	
Germany	Andrea Schöpp	9	3	6	52	56	35	40	15	4	75%	
Great Britain	Eve Muirhead	9	3	6	54	59	36	41	11	10	75%	
Japan	Moe Meguro	9	3	6	64	70	36	37	13	5	73%	
Russia	Liudmila Privivkova	9	3	6	53	60	36	40	14	13	77%	
United States	Debbie McCormick	9	2	7	43	65	36	36	12	12	77%	

Team

Name	Position
Wang Bingyu	Skip
Liu Yin	Third
Yue Qingshuang	Second
Zhou Yan	Lead
Liu Jinli	Alternate

Round-robin

Draw 2

Sheet A	1	2	3	4	5	6	7	8	9	10	11	Final
China (Wang)	0	1	0	0	0	0	0	1	0	2	0	4
Great Britain (Muirhead) 🔨	0	0	0	1	2	0	0	0	1	0	1	5

Draw 3

Sheet D	1	2	3	4	5	6	7	8	9	10	Final
China (Wang)	0	1	0	0	4	0	1	1	0	1	8
Switzerland (Ott) 🔨	2	0	0	1	0	1	0	0	2	0	6

Draw 4

Sheet B	1	2	3	4	5	6	7	8	9	10	Final
China (Wang) 🔨	2	0	0	0	2	0	2	0	0	3	9
Japan (Meguro)	0	1	0	1	0	1	0	2	0	0	5

Draw 5

Sheet C	1	2	3	4	5	6	7	8	9	10	Final
China (Wang) 🔨	1	2	1	2	0	5	x	x	x	x	11
Denmark (Jensen)	0	0	0	0	1	0	x	x	x	x	1

Draw 6

Sheet B	1	2	3	4	5	6	7	8	9	10	Final
Sweden (Norberg) 🔨	1	0	1	0	2	0	0	1	0	1	6
China (Wang)	0	0	0	1	0	0	1	0	2	0	4

Draw 7

Sheet D	1	2	3	4	5	6	7	8	9	10	11	Final
Germany (Schöpp)	0	1	0	2	0	2	0	1	0	1	0	7
China (Wang) 🔨	1	0	1	0	2	0	2	0	1	0	2	9

Draw 9

Sheet B	1	2	3	4	5	6	7	8	9	10	11	Final
China (Wang) 🔨	2	1	0	1	0	0	0	1	0	0	1	6
Canada (Bernard)	0	0	1	0	1	1	1	0	0	1	0	5

Draw 10

Sheet A	1	2	3	4	5	6	7	8	9	10	Final
Russia (Sidorova)	0	0	3	0	1	0	1	1	1	x	7
China (Wang) 🔨	1	0	0	1	0	2	0	0	0	x	4

Draw 11

Sheet C	1	2	3	4	5	6	7	8	9	10	Final
United States (McCormick)	0	1	1	0	0	2	0	1	0	0	5
China (Wang) 🔨	1	0	0	2	1	0	1	0	0	1	6

Semifinal

Team	1	2	3	4	5	6	7	8	9	10	Final
China (Wang)	0	0	0	1	0	1	1	0	1	x	4
Sweden (Norberg) 🔨	1	1	1	0	3	0	0	3	0	x	9

Bronze medal final

Team	1	2	3	4	5	6	7	8	9	10	Final
China (Wang) 🔨	3	0	2	0	1	0	2	4	x	x	12
Switzerland (Ott)	0	1	0	3	0	2	0	0	x	x	6

== Figure skating ==
China has qualified one entrant in ladies singles, three in pair skating, and one in ice dancing for a total of nine athletes. Shen Xue and Zhao Hongbo set a new world record in both the overall combined score and the short program while teammates Pang Qing and Tong Jian set a new world record in the free skate.

Athlete	Event	CD		SP/OD		FS/FD		Total	
Athlete	Event	Points	Rank	Points	Rank	Points	Rank	Points	Rank
Liu Yan	Ladies'			51.74	19	91.73	18	143.47	19
Shen Xue, Zhao Hongbo	Pairs			76.66 WR	1	139.91	2	216.57 WR	1st place, gold medalist(s)
Pang Qing, Tong Jian	Pairs			71.50	4	141.81 WR	1	213.31	2nd place, silver medalist(s)
Zhang Dan, Zhang Hao	Pairs			71.28	5	123.06	4	194.34	5
Huang Xintong, Zheng Xun	Ice dancing	29.22	19	45.03	20	71.27	20	145.52	19

== Freestyle skiing ==
Men

Event	Athlete	Qualifying		Final	
Event	Athlete	Points	Rank	Points	Rank
Aerials	Han Xiaopeng	192.52	21	Did not advance	
Aerials	Jia Zongyang	242.52	1 Q	237.57	6
Aerials	Liu Zhongqing	229.67	11 Q	242.53	3rd place, bronze medalist(s)
Aerials	Qi Guangpu	230.28	10 Q	234.85	7

Women

Event	Athlete	Qualifying		Final	
Event	Athlete	Points	Rank	Points	Rank
Aerials	Cheng Shuang	180.91	4 Q	187.87	7
Aerials	Guo Xinxin	189.16	3 Q	205.22	Bronze medal
Aerials	Li Nina	192.10	2 Q	207.23	Silver medal
Aerials	Xu Mengtao	168.55	8 Q	191.61	6

== Ice hockey ==
=== Women's tournament ===
See also China women's national ice hockey team

Roster

The following is the Chinese roster in the women's ice hockey tournament of the 2010 Winter Olympics.

Position	Name	Height	Weight	Birthdate	Birthplace	2009–10 team
G	Han Danni	165	58	9 January 1991	Harbin	Qiqihar
G	Jia Dandan	163	55	5 May 1982	Harbin	Harbin
G	Shi Yao	178	70	13 January 1987	Harbin	Harbin
D	Jiang Na	174	75	18 October 1988	Harbin	Harbin
D	Liu Zhixin	174	68	25 April 1993	Qiqihar	Qiqihar
D	Lou Yue	160	60	22 April 1987	Harbin	Harbin
D	Qi Xueting	158	58	7 November 1986	Harbin	Harbin
D	Tan Anqi	175	67	10 June 1986	Harbin	Harbin
D	Wang Nan	164	67	22 April 1988	Harbin	Harbin
D	Yu Baiwei	166	68	17 July 1988	Harbin	Harbin
D	Zhang Shuang	162	58	7 March 1987	Harbin	Harbin
F	Cui Shanshan	177	67	8 May 1987	Harbin	Harbin
F	Gao Fujin	162	65	15 July 1984	Harbin	Harbin
F	Huang Haijing	172	72	3 July 1988	Harbin	Harbin
F	Huo Cui	160	54	13 September 1988	Harbin	Harbin
F	Jin Fengling – A	166	56	20 November 1982	Harbin	Harbin
F	Ma Rui	172	69	29 March 1989	Harbin	Harbin
F	Su Ziwei	162	65	9 December 1984	Harbin	Harbin
F	Sun Rui – A	169	60	14 May 1982	Harbin	Harbin
F	Tang Liang	163	54	26 August 1985	Harbin	Harbin
F	Wang Linuo – C	160	57	28 August 1979	Harbin	Harbin
F	Zhang Ben	170	61	22 July 1985	Harbin	Harbin
F	Zhang Mengying	166	55	22 December 1993	Qiqihar	Qiqihar

==== Group play ====
China played in Group B.

Round-robin

All times are local (UTC-8).

14 February 2010; 12:00	United States	12–1 (5–0, 3–0, 4–1)	China	UBC Winter Sports Centre, Vancouver; Attendance: 5,278

Game reference

Molly Schaus (out 52:00) / Brianne McLaughlin (in 52:00)
Goalies
Shi Yao
Referee:
Ulla Sipilä (Finland)

Ruggiero – 2:50	1–0
Stack (Chu) – 9:56	2–0
Potter (M. Lamoureux) – 14:22	3–0
Duggan (Stack, Darwitz) (PP) – 17:40	4–0
Potter (Knight, M. Lamoureux) – 18:01	5–0
Potter (Engstrom, Chesson) (PP) – 21:18	6–0
Chesson (Marvin, Chu) – 23:46	7–0
J. Lamoureux (Thatcher) – 39:39	8–0
Duggan (Marvin, Potter) – 43:59	9–0
Engstrom (Potter, M. Lamoureux) – 50:43	10–0
Darwitz (M. Lamoureux, Weiland) – 54:43	11–0
	11–1	57:39 – Jin (Ma, Sun) (PP)
Chu (Darwitz) – 59:21	12–1

8 min
Penalties
12 min
61
Shots
7

16 February 2010; 19:00	Finland	2–1 (0–1, 2–0, 0–0)	China	UBC Winter Sports Centre, Vancouver; Attendance: 5,317

Game reference

Noora Räty
Goalies
Shi Yao
Referee:
Joy Tottman (Great Britain)

	0–1	18:10 – Wang L. (SH)
Rantamäki (Pelttari, Lindstedt) (PP) – 29:13	1–1
Hovi – 34:02	2–1

10 min
Penalties
20 min
43
Shots
5

18 February 2010; 19:00	China	1–2 (0–0, 1–2, 0–0)	Russia	UBC Winter Sports Centre, Vancouver; Attendance: 5,391

Game reference

Shi Yao
Goalies
Irina Gashennikova
Referee:
Mary Anne Gage (Canada)
Linesmen:
Meghan Margaret Hishmeh (United States)
Anna Majapuro (Finland)

	0–1	24:23 – Smolentseva (Kapustina, Khomich)
	0–2	36:02 – Sergina (Burina, Permyakova) (PP)
Jin (Sun) – 37:38	1–2

4 min
Penalties
12 min
22
Shots
39

Standings

Team	Pld	W	OTW	OTL	L	GF	GA	GD	Pts	Qualification
United States	3	3	0	0	0	31	1	+30	9	Semifinals
Finland	3	2	0	0	1	7	8	−1	6	Semifinals
Russia	3	1	0	0	2	3	19	−16	3	5–8th classification
China	3	0	0	0	3	3	16	−13	0	5–8th classification

Source: ESPN

==== Classification round ====
Fifth place semifinal

20 February 2010; 14:30	Switzerland	6–0 (2–0, 2–0, 2–0)	China	UBC Winter Sports Centre, Vancouver; Attendance: 5,454

Game reference

Florence Schelling
Goalies
Shi Yao (out 7:53)
Jia Dandan (in 7:53)
Referee:
Leah Wrazidlo (United States)

Lehmann (S. Marty) – 7:02	1–0
S. Marty – 7:53	2–0
Nussbaum (J. Marty, Lehmann) (PP) – 37:12	3–0
S. Marty (Lehmann, Leimgruber) – 39:44	4–0
S. Marty (Lehmann, Meier) – 54:54	5–0
S. Marty (Leimgruber, Benz) – 58:48	6–0

16 min
Penalties
6 min
49
Shots
21

Seventh place game

22 February 2010; 14:00	China	3–1 (0–1, 1–0, 2–0)	Slovakia	UBC Winter Sports Centre, Vancouver; Attendance: 5,284

Game reference

Shi Yao
Goalies
Zuzana Tomčíková
Referee:
Joy Tottman (Great Britain)

	0–1	10:37 – Pravlíková (Jurčová, Veličková)
Wang L. (Yu, Jiang) – 37:15	1–1
Sun (Zhang S., Jin) – 45:04	2–1
Wang L. (Zhang B.) – 51:44	3–1

4 min
Penalties
6 min
32
Shots
21

== Short track speed skating ==
China has 10 qualified teams to this sporting event.

Men

Event	Athlete	Heat		Quarterfinal		Semifinal		Final	
Event	Athlete	Time	Position	Time	Position	Time	Position	Time	Position
500 m	Han Jialiang	41.869	1 Q	41.443	3	did not advance			
500 m	Liang Wenhao	DSQ							
500 m	Ma Yunfeng	41.954	3	did not advance					
1000 m	Han Jialiang	1:26.479	1 Q	1:25.856	2 Q	1:25.462	4 QB	1:32.023	6
1000 m	Liang Wenhao	1:26.249	2 Q	1:25.060	3	did not advance			
1000 m	Ma Yunfeng	1:25.814	4	did not advance					
1500 m	Liu Xianwei	2:14.354	3 Q			2:14.500	5 Q	did not advance	
1500 m	Liang Wenhao	2:16.152	1 Q			2:15.453	2 Q	2:48.192	6
1500 m	Song Weilong	2:20.095	6	did not advance					
5000 m relay	Han Jialiang; Liu Xianwei; Ma Yunfeng; Song Weilong					6:43.601	1 QA	6:44.630	4

Women

- Liu Qiuhong
- Zhang Hui

Event	Athlete	Heat		Quarterfinal		Semifinal		Final	
Event	Athlete	Time	Position	Time	Position	Time	Position	Time	Position
500 m	Wang Meng	43.926	1 Q	43.284	1 Q	42.985	1 QA OR	43.048	1st place, gold medalist(s)
500 m	Zhou Yang	44.115	1 Q	44.106	1 Q	43.992	3 QB	44.725	5
500 m	Zhao Nannan	1:02.132	4	did not advance					
1000 m	Wang Meng	1:30.958	1 Q	1:32.267	1 Q	1:30.573	2 QA	1:29.213	1st place, gold medalist(s)
1000 m	Zhou Yang	1:30.781	1 Q	1:29.849	1 Q	1:29.049	1 QA	DSQ	
1000 m	Sun Linlin	1:30.629	2 Q	1:30.589	3	did not advance			
1500 m	Wang Meng	2:29.199	1 Q			DSQ			
1500 m	Zhou Yang	2:24.246	1 Q			2:21.049	2 QA	2:16.993	1st place, gold medalist(s)
1500 m	Sun Linlin	2:24.031	2 Q			2:24.777	3 QB	2:42.960	10
3000 m relay	Sun Linlin; Wang Meng; Zhang Hui; Zhou Yang					4:08.797	1 Q	4:06.610	(gold) WR

== Snowboarding ==
Men

Event	Athlete	Qualification			Semifinal			Finals		
Event	Athlete	Run 1	Run 2	Rank	Run 1	Run 2	Rank	Run 1	Run 2	Rank
Halfpipe	Shi Wancheng	15.8	18.0	19	did not advance					
Halfpipe	Zeng Xiaoye	14.0	32.8	5 Q	32.9	16.2	10	did not advance		

Women

Event	Athlete	Qualification			Semifinal			Finals		
Event	Athlete	Run 1	Run 2	Rank	Run 1	Run 2	Rank	Run 1	Run 2	Rank
Halfpipe	Cai Xuetong	14.1	19.3	23	did not advance					
Halfpipe	Liu Jiayu	26.3	33.3	12 Q	41.1	36.2	2 Q	39.3	34.9	4
Halfpipe	Sun Zhifeng	38.2	39.9	6 QF	n/a			29.8	33.0	7

Key: Q=Qualified for next round, QF=Qualified directly for the final

== Speed skating ==
Men

Event	Athlete	Race 1		Race 2		Final	
Event	Athlete	Time	Rank	Time	Rank	Time	Rank
500 metres	Wang Nan	35.915	26	35.928	25	71.84	25
500 metres	Yu Fengtong	35.116	7	35.120	7	70.23	7
500 metres	Zhang Zhongqi	35.175	14	35.113	6	70.288	10
500 metres	Liu Fangyi	36.193	34	36.047	27	72.24	28
1000 metres	Wang Nan					1:11.82	31
1500 metres	Sun Longjiang					1:51.30	35
1500 metres	Gao Xuefeng					1:50.78	34

Women

Event	Athlete	Race 1		Race 2		Final	
Event	Athlete	Time	Rank	Time	Rank	Time	Rank
500 metres	Jin Peiyu	38.68	6	38.771	11	77.45	8
500 metres	Wang Beixing	38.48	3	38.144	3	76.63	3rd place, bronze medalist(s)
500 metres	Xing Aihua	38.79	11	38.849	16	77.64	13
500 metres	Zhang Shuang	38.53	5	38.807	13	77.33	7
1000 metres	Jin Peiyu					1:17.97	18
1000 metres	Ren Hui					1:19.18	33
1000 metres	Wang Beixing					1:18.30	24
1000 metres	Yu Jing					1:19.13	32
1500 metres	Wang Fei					2:00.65	20
3000 metres	Fu Chunyan					4:20.62	25
3000 metres	Wang Fei					4:18.42	22

== Related teams ==
Athletes from the Hong Kong Special Administrative Region compete separately as "Hong Kong, China".

== See also ==
- China at the 2010 Winter Paralympics
