= Speed skating at the 2011 Asian Winter Games – Men's 1500 metres =

Men's 1500 metres at the 2011 Asian Winter Games
- Venue: Alau Ice Palace
- Dates: 4 February 2011
- Competitors: 12 from 6 nations

Medalists
| gold medal | Denis Kuzin | Kazakhstan |
| silver medal | Mo Tae-bum | South Korea |
| bronze medal | Lee Kyou-hyuk | South Korea |

The Men's 1500 metres event was held on 4 February 2011. 12 athletes participated.

== Schedule ==
All times are Almaty Time (UTC+06:00)

| Date | Time | Event |
|---|---|---|
| Friday, 4 February 2011 | 16:05 | Final |

== Records ==
Prior to this competition, the existing world and Games records were as follows.

| World Record | Shani Davis (USA) | 1:41.04 | Salt Lake City, United States | 11 December 2009 |
| Games Record | Lee Kyou-hyuk (KOR) | 1:49.13 | Changchun, China | 31 January 2007 |

== Results ==
| Rank | Pair | Athlete | Time | Notes |
|---|---|---|---|---|
| 1st place, gold medalist(s) | 3 | Denis Kuzin (KAZ) | 1:47.37 | GR |
| 2nd place, silver medalist(s) | 3 | Mo Tae-bum (KOR) | 1:47.71 | |
| 3rd place, bronze medalist(s) | 6 | Lee Kyou-hyuk (KOR) | 1:48.66 | |
| 4 | 4 | Gao Xuefeng (CHN) | 1:48.86 | |
| 5 | 4 | Alexandr Zhigin (KAZ) | 1:49.09 | |
| 6 | 5 | Sun Longjiang (CHN) | 1:50.35 | |
| 7 | 6 | Taro Kondo (JPN) | 1:51.85 | |
| 8 | 5 | Daiki Wakabayashi (JPN) | 1:51.96 | |
| 9 | 1 | Galbaataryn Uuganbaatar (MGL) | 1:59.46 | |
| 10 | 2 | Galbaataryn Belgutei (MGL) | 2:06.42 | |
| 11 | 1 | Abdulla Al-Sulaiti (QAT) | 2:33.04 | |
| 12 | 2 | Hassan Farhan (QAT) | 3:18.36 | |
