= Speed skating at the 2011 Asian Winter Games – Women's 500 metres =

Women's 500 metres at the 2011 Asian Winter Games
- Venue: Alau Ice Palace
- Dates: 1 February 2011
- Competitors: 10 from 6 nations

Medalists
gold medal	Yu Jing	China
silver medal	Wang Beixing	China
bronze medal	Lee Sang-hwa	South Korea

The Women's 500 metres event was held on February 1. 10 athletes participated.

== Schedule ==
All times are Almaty Time (UTC+06:00)

Date	Time	Event
Tuesday, 1 February 2011	15:00	Race 1
Tuesday, 1 February 2011	16:07	Race 2

== Records ==
=== 500 meters ===
Prior to this competition, the existing world and Games records were as follows.

World Record	Jenny Wolf (GER)	37.00	Salt Lake City, United States	11 December 2009
Games Record	Wang Beixing (CHN)	38.02	Changchun, China	1 February 2007

=== 500 meters × 2 ===
Prior to this competition, the existing world and Games records were as follows.

World Record	Jenny Wolf (GER)	1:14.42	Salt Lake City, United States	10 March 2007
Games Record	Wang Beixing (CHN)	1:16.10	Changchun, China	1 February 2007

== Results ==
Rank	Athlete	Race 1		Race 2		Total	Notes
Rank	Athlete	Pair	Time	Pair	Time	Total	Notes
1st place, gold medalist(s)	Yu Jing (CHN)	4	37.856 GR	5	38.235	1:16.09	GR
2nd place, silver medalist(s)	Wang Beixing (CHN)	3	38.305	5	38.228	1:16.53	
3rd place, bronze medalist(s)	Lee Sang-hwa (KOR)	3	38.311	4	38.269	1:16.58	
4	Maki Tsuji (JPN)	5	38.771	2	38.508	1:17.27	
5	Nao Kodaira (JPN)	2	38.724	3	39.004	1:17.72	
6	Yekaterina Aydova (KAZ)	5	38.946	4	38.849	1:17.79	
7	Lee Bo-ra (KOR)	2	39.182	2	39.168	1:18.35	
8	Tatyana Sokirko (KAZ)	4	41.090	1	41.082	1:22.16	
9	Dalanbayaryn Delgermaa (MGL)	1	45.808	1	45.367	1:31.17	
10	Ko Hyon-suk (PRK)	1	38.948	3	57.294	1:36.24	
