= Speed skating at the 2011 Asian Winter Games – Men's 500 metres =

Men's 500 metres at the 2011 Asian Winter Games
- Venue: Alau Ice Palace
- Dates: 1 February 2011
- Competitors: 12 from 6 nations

Medalists
gold medal	Joji Kato	Japan
silver medal	Lee Kang-seok	South Korea
bronze medal	Keiichiro Nagashima	Japan

The men's 500 metres event was held February 1. 12 athletes participated.

== Schedule ==
All times are Almaty Time (UTC+06:00)

Date	Time	Event
Tuesday, 1 February 2011	15:30	Race 1
Tuesday, 1 February 2011	16:32	Race 2

== Records ==
=== 500 meters ===
Prior to this competition, the existing world and Games records were as follows.

World Record	Jeremy Wotherspoon (CAN)	34.03	Salt Lake City, United States	9 November 2007
Games Record	Lee Kang-seok (KOR)	35.11	Changchun, China	30 January 2007

=== 500 meters × 2 ===
Prior to this competition, the existing world and Games records were as follows.

World Record	Jeremy Wotherspoon (CAN)	1:08.31	Calgary, Canada	15 March 2008
Games Record	Lee Kang-seok (KOR)	1:10.30	Changchun, China	30 January 2007

== Results ==
Legend

- DNF — Did not finish
- DNS — Did not start

Rank	Athlete	Race 1		Race 2		Total	Notes
Rank	Athlete	Pair	Time	Pair	Time	Total	Notes
1st place, gold medalist(s)	Joji Kato (JPN)	3	35.026 GR	6	34.983 GR	1:10.00	GR
2nd place, silver medalist(s)	Lee Kang-seok (KOR)	4	35.298	6	35.060	1:10.35	
3rd place, bronze medalist(s)	Keiichiro Nagashima (JPN)	6	35.151	5	35.279	1:10.43	
4	Zhang Zhongqi (CHN)	6	35.336	5	35.439	1:10.77	
5	Mo Tae-bum (KOR)	5	35.512	4	35.466	1:10.97	
6	Wang Nan (CHN)	4	36.069	4	35.611	1:11.68	
7	Alexey Bondarchuk (KAZ)	3	36.025	3	35.944	1:11.96	
8	Viktor Glushchenko (KAZ)	5	36.952	3	36.073	1:13.02	
9	Galbaataryn Uuganbaatar (MGL)	2	39.621	2	39.545	1:19.16	
10	Galbaataryn Belgutei (MGL)	1	40.398	2	40.606	1:21.00	
11	Thamer Al-Mohannadi (QAT)	2	56.629	1	55.281	1:51.91	
—	Mohammed Al-Obaildy (QAT)	1	82.214	1	DNS	DNF	
