= Korea at the 2010 Winter Olympics =

Korea at the 2010 Winter Olympics may refer to:

- North Korea at the 2010 Winter Olympics
- South Korea at the 2010 Winter Olympics
