= Yoon Hee-jun =

Yoon Hee-jun may refer to:

- Yoon Hee-jun (footballer) (born 1972), South Korean footballer
- Yoon Hee-jun (speed skater) (born 1985), South Korean speed skater
