= Qatar at the 2011 Asian Winter Games =

- IOC code: QAT
- NOC: Qatar Olympic Committee

in Astana and Almaty
- Competitors: 4 in 1 sport
- Flag bearer: Thamer Al-Mohannadi
- Medals: Gold 0 Silver 0 Bronze 0 Total 0

Asian Winter Games appearances
- 2011; 2017; 2025; 2029

Qatar participated in the 2011 Asian Winter Games in Almaty and Astana, Kazakhstan, from January 30, 2011, to February 6, 2011. This was Qatar's debut at a major winter sporting event. Qatar was originally also scheduled to send a men's hockey team, but it later withdrew.

== Speed skating ==
Qatar will send 4 speed skaters.

Men

Athlete	Event	Race 1		Race 2		Final	
Athlete	Event	Time	Rank	Time	Rank	Time	Rank
Thamer Al-Mohannadi	500 m	56.62	11	55.28	11	111.91	11
Hassan Farhan	1500 m					3:18.36	12
Abdulla Al Sulaiti	1500 m					2:33.04	11
Mohammed Ahmed Al-Obaidly	500 m	82.21	12	DNS			
