= Yeo Sang-yeop =

South Korean speed skater

Yeo Sang-Yeop
Personal information
- Born: July 22, 1984 (age 41) South Korea
- Height: 1.70 m (5 ft 7 in)
- Weight: 65 kg (143 lb; 10.2 st)

Sport
- Country: South Korea
- Sport: Speed skating
Medal record
Men's speed skating
Representing South Korea
World Junior Championships
Bronze medal – third place	2001 Groningen	All Around
Bronze medal – third place	2004 Roseville	All Around
Winter Universiade
Silver medal – second place	2007 Turin	1500 m
Silver medal – second place	2009 Harbin	Team Pursuit
Asian Winter Games
Silver medal – second place	2007 Changchun	5000 m
Bronze medal – third place	2003 Aomori	1500 m

Yeo Sang-Yeop (Korean: 여상엽; born 22 July 1984) is a South Korean speed skater. He represented his country at the 2002 Winter Olympics in Salt Lake City. In Salt Lake City where he finished in 42nd position at the 1500m. In his second Winter Olympics, 2006 Winter Olympics in Turin, he competed at 5000m. He finished 28th at the 5000m.

He won the bronze medal in 2003 Asian Winter Games at the 1500m, and won the silver medal in 2007 Asian Winter Games at the 5000m.

== Personal records ==
- 500m — 37.35 (17 November 2002, Erfurt)
- 1000m — 1:15.86 (27 December 2000, Seoul)
- 1500m — 1:50.60 (8 November 2008, Berlin)
- 3000m — 3:55.03 (17 November 2002, Erfurt)
- 5000m — 6:28.49 (19 November 2005, Salt Lake City)
- 10000m — 13:55.11 (4 December 2005, Heerenveen)
