= Malaysia at the 2007 Asian Winter Games =

- IOC code: MAS
- NOC: Olympic Council of Malaysia
- Website: www.olympic.org.my (in English)

in Changchun
- Competitors: 21
- Medals: Gold 0 Silver 0 Bronze 0 Total 0

Asian Winter Games appearances
- 2007; 2011; 2017; 2025; 2029

Malaysia participated in the 2007 Asian Winter Games held in Changchun, China from 28 January 2007 to 4 February 2007.

== Ice hockey ==
=== Men's tournament ===
Group D

Team	Pld	W	D	L	GF	GA	GD	Pts
South Korea	2	2	0	0	25	1	+24	6
Malaysia	2	1	0	1	8	17	–9	3
Hong Kong	2	0	0	2	3	18	–15	0

26 January; 20:30	Malaysia	7 – 3 (3–3, 1–0, 3–0)	Hong Kong	Fuao Ice Hockey Rink, Changchun; Attendance: 710

Game reference

Abdul Hakim Ismail
Goalies
Samuel Wong
Referee:
Sergey Khalikov (KAZ)

Razali Chee) – 02:43	1–0
Teh T.T. (Khoo S.C.) – 11:05	2–0
	2–1	13:59 – Cheung (PP)
Tan K.P. (Teh T.T.) (PP) – 15:39	3–1
	3–2	18:04 – Cheung (T. Wong) (PP)
	3–3	18:25 – Ng C.M. (Suen C.F.)
Khoo S.C. – 37:10	4–3
David – 42:35	5–3
Chee – 49:17	6–3
Tan K.P. (Teh T.T.) – 49:49	7–3

18 min
Penalties
14 min
36
Shots
21

29 January; 20:30	Malaysia	1 – 14 (0–3, 0–4, 1–7)	South Korea	Fuao Ice Hockey Rink, Changchun; Attendance: 340

Game reference

Tengku Mohd Azlly (51:02)
Abdul Hakim Ismail (8:58)
Goalies
Son Ho-Sung (30:35)
Eum Hyun-Seung (29:25)
Referee:
Keith Fong (HKG)

	0–1	00:49 – Kim H.I. (Kim K.T.)
	0–2	01:23 – Park W.S. (Kim K.S., Park S.M.)
	0–3	02:17 – Lee K.Ja. (Choi J.S., Lee M.W.)
	0–4	21:31 – Kim K.H. (Park W.S., Park S.M.)
	0–5	30:23 – Choi J.S. (Lee Y.J.)
	0–6	31:23 – Kim H.I. (Kim K.T.) (SH)
	0–7	33:56 – Jeon J.H. (Lee K.Jo.)
	0–8	42:18 – Lee K.Ja. (Lee Y.J., Choi J.S.)
	0–9	44:10 – Park W.S. (Kim K.H., Kim K.S.)
	0–10	47:13 – Kim K.S. (Kim K.H., Lee M.W.)
	0–11	50:19 – Lee K.Jo. (Kim H.I., Suh S.I.) (PP)
	0–12	51:10 – Lee M.W. (Lee Y.J., Hwang B.W.)
	0–13	51:43 – Lee M.W. (Lee K.Ja., Hwang B.W.)
	0–14	55:36 – Kim K.T. (Lee K.Jo., Kim H.I.)
Razali (Tan K.P.) – 58:39	1–14

10 min
Penalties
22 min
4
Shots
39

Fifth to eighth place classification

30 January; 17:00	North Korea	15 – 0 (8–0, 3–0, 4–0)	Malaysia	Fuao Ice Hockey Rink, Changchun; Attendance: 350

Game reference

Ri Song-Chol (20:00)
Pak Kun-Hyok (40:00)
Goalies
Abdul Hakim Ismail (40:00)
Tengku Mohd Azlly (20:00)
Referee:
Christer Larking (SWE)

Song C.S. (Ri S.I., Kim H.C.) – 02:09	1–0
Song C.S. (SH) – 03:26	2–0
Song C.S. (Ri S.I., Ri K.S.) – 07:44	3–0
Kim K.I. (Mun C.) – 08:31	4–0
Jang M.J. (Ri S.G.) – 10:20	5–0
Ho K.C. (Ri K.S., Ri S.I.) (PP) – 16:29	6–0
Mun C. (Kim K.I., Ri P.I.) – 16:55	7–0
Ri P.I. (Kim K.H., Mun C.) – 18:09	8–0
Kim K.H. (Kim K.I., Ri P.I.) – 21:15	9–0
Pak S.C. (Jang M.J., Ri S.G.) – 21:46	10–0
Kim K.H. (Han J.U.) – 34:32	11–0
Kim K.I. (Han J.U., Mun C.) – 54:35	12–0
Kim C.M. – 55:27	13–0
Kim K.H. – 55:58	14–0
Ri C.M. (Jang M.J.) – 57:51	15–0

8 min
Penalties
6 min
48
Shots
7

Seventh and eighth place classification

2 February; 17:00	Malaysia	2 – 10 (1–2, 1–5, 0–3)	Kuwait	Fuao Ice Hockey Rink, Changchun; Attendance: 350

Game reference

Abdul Hakim Ismail (30:48)
Tengku Mohd Azlly (28:43)
Goalies
Jasem Al-Sarraf
Referee:
Wang Zhanyong (CHN)

Beh (Razali) – 01:02	1–0
	1–1	08:45 – Al-Kandari (Mo. Al-Ajmi) (PP)
	1–2	12:31 – Mo. Al-Ajmi
	1–3	24:33 – Mo. Al-Ajmi
	1–4	24:52 – Me. Al-Ajmi (A. Al-Ajmi)
	1–5	30:48 – Mo. Al-Ajmi (Abdulrahim)
Chee (Khoo S.C., Bazli) (PP) – 36:24	2–5
	2–6	37:57 – Al-Saberi (Al-Maragi)
	2–7	38:22 – Me. Al-Ajmi (A. Al-Ajmi)
	2–8	40:24 – Mo. Al-Ajmi (A. Al-Ajmi)
	2–9	49:44 – Mo. Al-Ajmi
	2–10	55:49 – S. Al-Ajmi (PP)

45 min
Penalties
49 min
25
Shots
34

Ranked 8th in final standings
