= Kim Yoo-rim =

South Korean speed skater

Kim Yoo-rim (김유림)
Personal information
- Born: 3 February 1990 (age 36) South Korea
- Height: 1.60 m (5 ft 3 in)
- Weight: 57 kg (126 lb)

Sport
- Country: South Korea
- Sport: Speed skating
Medal record
Representing South Korea
Women's speed skating
World Junior Championships
Gold medal – first place	2006 Erfurt	All Around
Asian Winter Games
Bronze medal – third place	2007 Changchun	1000 m

Kim Yoo-rim (Korean: 김유림, sometimes rendered Kim Yu-rim or Kim Yu-lim; born 3 February 1990) is a South Korean speed skater. She competed at the 2006 Winter Olympics in Torino, women's speed skating 500 m and 100 m. She finished in 20th position at the 500 m, 28th at the 1000 m. She competed in the 1000 m at the 2010 Winter Olympics in Vancouver, but she did not finish the race.
