= North Korea at the 2010 Winter Olympics =

- IOC code: PRK
- NOC: Olympic Committee of the Democratic People's Republic of Korea

in Vancouver
- Competitors: 2 in 2 sports
- Flag bearers: Ri Song-chol (Opening and Closing)
- Medals: Gold 0 Silver 0 Bronze 0 Total 0

Winter Olympics appearances (overview)
- 1964; 1968; 1972; 1976–1980; 1984; 1988; 1992; 1994; 1998; 2002; 2006; 2010; 2014; 2018; 2022; 2026; 2030

Other related appearances
- Korea (2018)

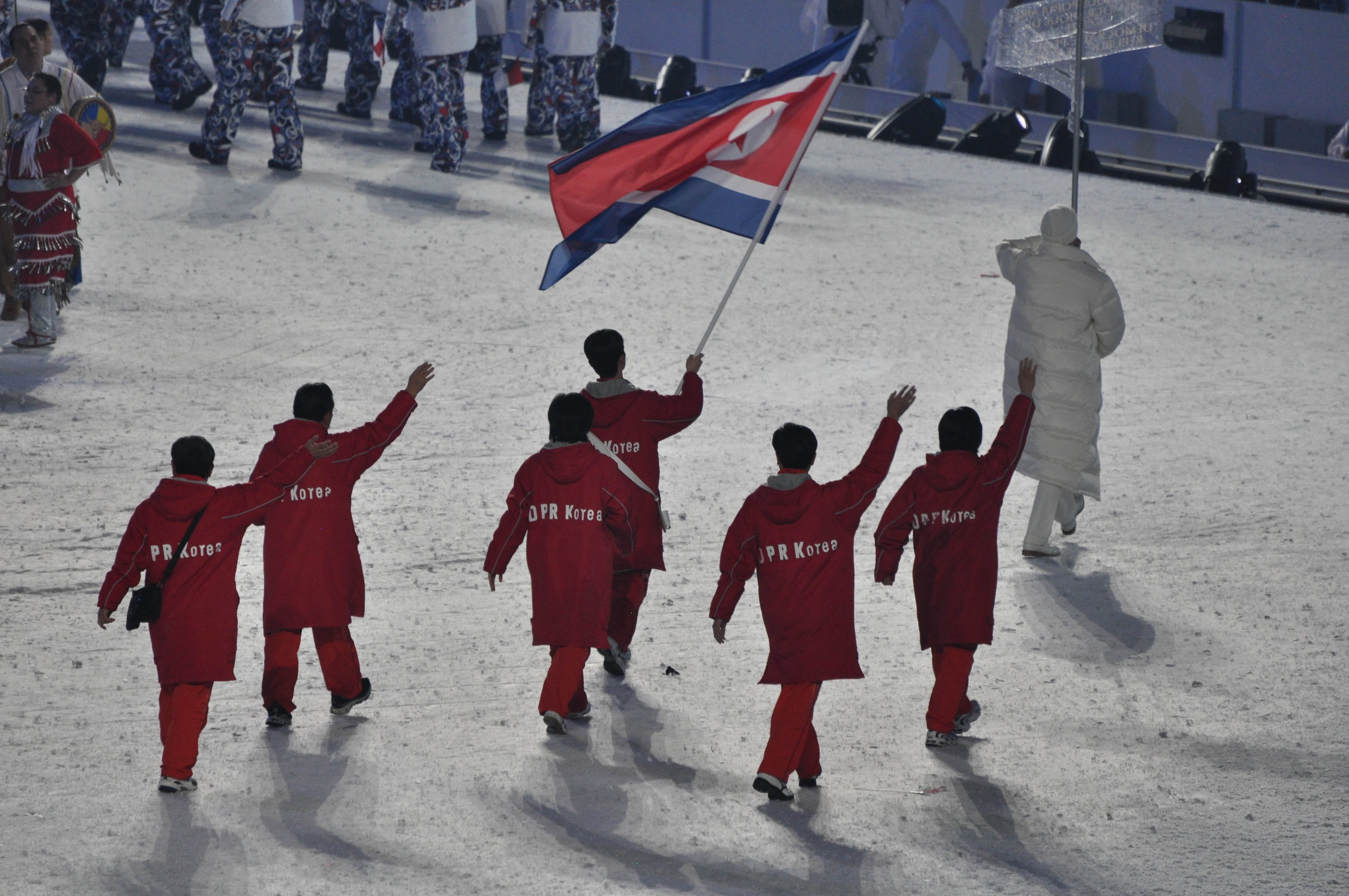
North Korea at the Opening Ceremony

North Korea (Democratic People's Republic of Korea) participated at the 2010 Winter Olympics in Vancouver, British Columbia, Canada. The team consisted of two athletes in two sports. They did not medal at these Olympics.

== Figure skating ==
Athlete(s)	Event	CD		SP/OD		FS/FD		Total	
Athlete(s)	Event	Points	Rank	Points	Rank	Points	Rank	Points	Rank
Ri Song-chol	Men			56.60	25	Did not advance to free skate			

== Speed skating ==
Ko Hyon-suk finished 13th in the 1000 meter race.

She finished ninth in the 500 meter race.

Women

Event	Athlete	Race 1		Race 2		Final	
Event	Athlete	Time	Rank	Time	Rank	Time	Rank
500 m	Ko Hyon-suk	38.893	15	38.577	7	1:17.47	9
1000 m	Ko Hyon-suk					1:17.63	13
