= Lee Kang-seok =

South Korean speed skater

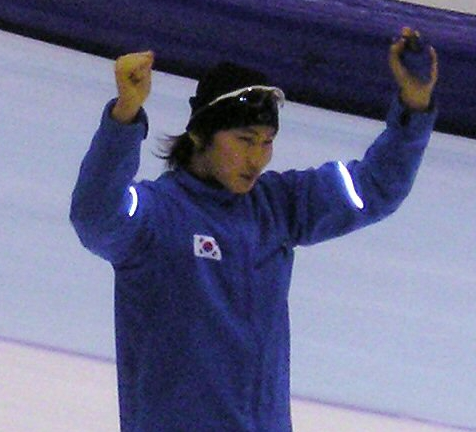
- Lee Kang-seok at the 2006 World Cup

Personal information
- Born: 28 February 1985 (age 41) Uijeongbu, South Korea
- Height: 1.78 m (5 ft 10 in)
- Weight: 71 kg (157 lb)

Sport
- Country: South Korea
- Sport: Speed skating

Achievements and titles
- World finals: 2006 (500 m); 2009 (100 m)
Medal record
Men's speed skating
Representing South Korea
Olympic Games
Bronze medal – third place	2006 Turin	500 m
World Sprint Championships
Silver medal – second place	2010 Obihiro	Sprint
World Single Distance Championships
Gold medal – first place	2007 Salt Lake City	500 m
Gold medal – first place	2009 Vancouver	500 m
Winter Universiade
Gold medal – first place	2007 Torino	500 m
Gold medal – first place	2009 Harbin	100 m
Gold medal – first place	2009 Harbin	500 m
Silver medal – second place	2007 Torino	1000 m
Bronze medal – third place	2005 Innsbruck	500 m
Bronze medal – third place	2009 Harbin	1000 m
Asian Winter Games
Gold medal – first place	2007 Changchun	500 m
Silver medal – second place	2011 Astana-Almaty	500 m
Bronze medal – third place	2007 Changchun	100 m

Lee Kang-seok (Korean: 이강석; Hanja: 李康奭, born 28 February 1985) is a South Korean speed skater. He is the 2007 and 2009 World Champion for 500 m. At the 2006 Winter Olympics, he won a bronze medal in the 500 m. He is the second South Korean person to win a medal in an event outside of short track speedskating, and he has become a representative to show that South Korea is expanding towards cultivating their athletes to excel in sports other than short track speed skating.

On 5 March 2006, Lee won his first World Cup title, winning the 2005–06 World Cup on the 500 m. A year later, Lee won gold at the World Single Distance Championships in the Utah Olympic Oval, setting a world record time of 34.25 seconds in the second race. The record has been broken since then by Jeremy Wotherspoon on 9 November 2007, with a time of 34.03 seconds. At the 2009 Winter Universiade in Harbin, China, Lee won the 500 m, beating Yu Fengtong with times of 35.00 and 34.82.

== Controversies ==
Lee had his South Korean driving license revoked for driving while intoxicated on 16 June 2012. He had a blood alcohol content of 0.12%.

== World record ==
Event	Time	Date	Venue
500 m	34.25	9 March 2007	Utah Olympic Oval, Salt Lake City

Source: SpeedSkatingStats.com
