= Lee Kyou-hyuk =

South Korean speed skater (born 1978)

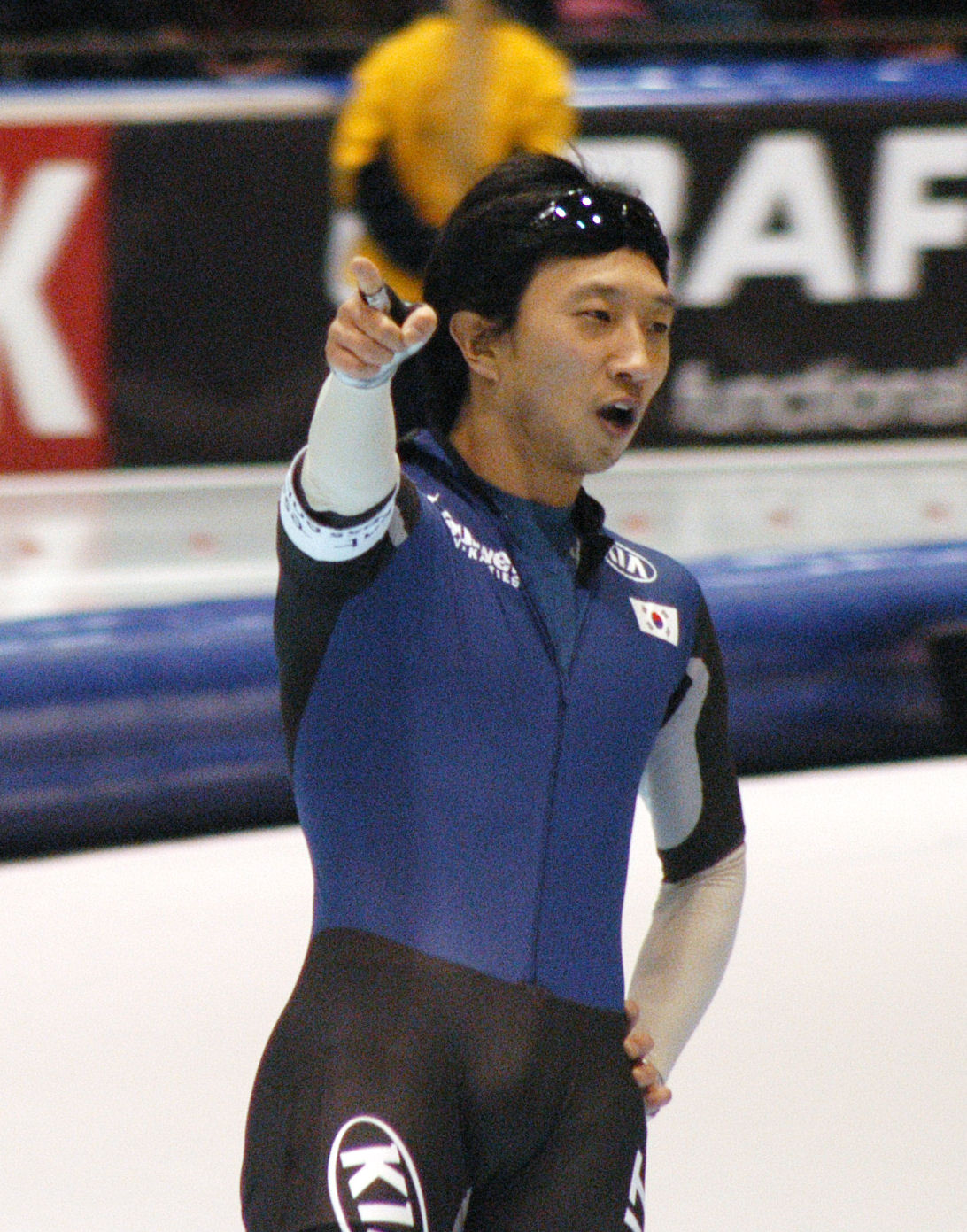
- Lee Kyou-hyuk, 2007

Personal information
- Born: 16 March 1978 (age 48) South Korea
- Height: 1.75 m (5 ft 9 in)
- Weight: 75 kg (165 lb)
- Spouse: Son Dam-bi (m. 2022)
- Children: 1

Sport
- Country: South Korea
- Sport: Speed skating
Medal record
Men's speed skating
Representing South Korea
World Sprint Championships
Gold medal – first place	2007 Hamar	Sprint
Gold medal – first place	2008 Heerenveen	Sprint
Gold medal – first place	2010 Obihiro	Sprint
Gold medal – first place	2011 Heerenveen	Sprint
Silver medal – second place	2012 Calgary	Sprint
World Single Distance Championships
Gold medal – first place	2011 Inzell	500 m
Silver medal – second place	2008 Nagano	500 m
Silver medal – second place	2009 Richmond	500 m
Bronze medal – third place	2007 Salt Lake City	1000 m
Winter Universiade
Silver medal – second place	1997 Muju-Jeonju	500 m
Bronze medal – third place	1997 Muju-Jeonju	1500 m
Asian Winter Games
Gold medal – first place	2003 Aomori	1000 m
Gold medal – first place	2003 Aomori	1500 m
Gold medal – first place	2007 Changchun	1000 m
Gold medal – first place	2007 Changchun	1500 m
Silver medal – second place	1999 Gangwon	1000 m
Silver medal – second place	2007 Changchun	500 m
Silver medal – second place	2011 Astana-Almaty	Team pursuit
Bronze medal – third place	2011 Astana-Almaty	1500 m

Korean name
- Hangul: 이규혁
- Hanja: 李奎爀
- RR: I Gyuhyeok
- MR: I Kyuhyŏk

Lee Kyou-hyuk (Korean: 이규혁; born 16 March 1978) is a South Korean retired long track speed skater who specializes in the 500 and 1,000 meters. He was the 2007, 2008, 2010 and 2011 World Sprint Speed Skating Champion and the 2011 World Champion for 500 m. He is one of four men to have won the World Sprint Speed Skating Championships four times.

His first world sprint championship, in 2007, was his first International Championships medal after a 13-year top-level career. As well as his success in the World Sprint Championships, Lee has fourteen wins in individual World Cup races, a gold medal, two silver and one bronze from the World Single Distance Championships and four gold medals from the Asian Winter Games as well as numerous South Korean titles, including 10 successive National Sprint Speed Skating Championships (2001–2010). He has set two world records during his career.

== Career ==
=== Junior ===
Lee made his debut in ISU events in 1992 at age 13, when he competed at the World Junior Championships in Warsaw. He did not qualify for the final distance, but his samalog total ranked him as 21st of 49 competitors and the second best from South Korea. He returned the following year but again failed to qualify, though he improved two places and was the best Korean after Bong Ju-hyeon got disqualified in the 1,500 meters.

In the 1994 season, Lee was sent to the first four World Cup races of the season as warm-up to the 1994 Winter Olympics at age 15. His best place came in Davos, where he was 21st of 36 on the 500 meters, but he earned no World Cup points. At the Olympics, Lee finished 36th at the 500 meters and 32nd at the 1,000 meters. At the World Junior Championships in Calgary, however, Lee qualified for the final distance for the first time and finished fourth overall, 0.098 points behind the bronze medalist.

Lee also finished fourth at the Junior Championships in 1995 and 1996, losing his lead after the opening three distances to long-distance specialists Bob de Jong and Mark Knoll. Nevertheless, he was selected to represent South Korea at the 1995 World Championships all round, where he finished fourth on the 500 meters but still failed to qualify for the final distance, ending as 20th. In the 1996 championship, however, he lowered the junior world record in the 500 meters to 36.59 seconds, though Jeremy Wotherspoon bettered it by 0.01 seconds two weeks later.

His World Cup placings improved little until 1996, when he got his first top ten placing of eighth at a World Cup meet in Medeo, though he still failed to place in the top 20 overall.

In his fourth international season as junior, Lee finished 21st in the World Allround after winning the 500 meters, and in eight World Cup appearances in 1997, Lee finished in the top ten three times, all on the 1,000 meters. He even made the podium 0.15 seconds behind winner Gerard van Velde at a race in Jeonju. This brought him up to 15th place overall in the 1,000 meter World Cup, though he did not skate in World Cup races in Europe or the world junior championships.

=== 1998 to 2001 ===
Over this period of his career, Lee was an out-and-out sprinter who only participated in the 500 and 1,000 meter races. Though he set a world record in the 1,500 meters, he never competed in World Cup races in that distance until 2002.

In the 1997–98 World Cup, Lee improved to 11th in the 1,000 meters and 16th in the 500 and won a World Cup race in Calgary with a world-record time of 1:10.42, his first world record. Over that weekend, the world record was cut 1.15 seconds. The record stood for a month until Jeremy Wotherspoon beat it in a domestic Canadian race. Lee missed the final two World Cup meets, before and after the Olympics, but after four of eight sprint events he was placed fifth in the 1,000 meters World Cup and tenth in the 500 meters World Cup. While still a world record holder, he won silver at the Asian Single Distance Championships in Obihiro, only beaten by fellow Korean Kim Yun-Man. Lee finished 12th at the World Sprint Championships in Berlin two weeks before the Olympics, and registered 8th (2 × 500) and 13th place (1,000) in his two Olympic appearances.

The following season was poor for Lee. He was relegated to the B group in the World Cup following finishes of between 25 and 38 in the opening race in Nagano, and did not figure in the top eight of the B group either. At the Asian Winter Games, he won silver on the 1,000 meters, but that tournament lacked the participation of the best Japanese skaters such as Hiroyasu Shimizu, Junichi Inoue and Yukinori Miyabe, who all beat Lee at the World Cup in Nagano.

Lee bounced back in 2000. In the first World Cup race of the season, Lee won the B group in the first 500-meter race, and finished third in the second 0.19 seconds behind winner Jeremy Wotherspoon. His B group appearances in the 1,000 meters was also good enough for promotion, and though he got no further podium places, he finished 11th overall in the 500-meter World Cup, his best placing to date. He also qualified for the World Single Distance Championships for the first time, taking 12th place on the 1,000 meters as his best result, and went below 1:10 for the first time in a World Cup race.

The 2001 season was even more consistent. Lee finished on the podium twice in a World Cup race, in Seoul (1,000) and Calgary (500), and in 20 World Cup starts he never finished out of the top 11 (though he took 11th place five times). He finished fourth in the overall World Cup standings in the 1,000 meters and sixth in the 500 meters, his best records in the overall World Cup. In the major championships, Lee took part in the World Sprint Championships for the first time in three years, finishing ninth just over a samalog point behind Mike Ireland.

In March, he rounded off the season with fourth and fifth place at the World Single Distance Championships in the Utah Olympic Oval. Times were significantly faster this season, and in March Lee registered 34.84 in the 500 meters (in Calgary and Salt Lake City, which was 0.85 better than his last season's time in Calgary) and 1:08.61 in the 1,000 meters (more than a second better than last season's World Cup final effort).

A week after the World Cup final event, Lee competed in an international race in Calgary, which he won with a new world record time of 1:45.20. The record stood for almost a year until Derek Parra beat it at the 2002 Winter Olympics in Salt Lake City.

=== 2002 to 2005 ===
Lee began the Olympic season with fifth place during a 500-meter race in the Utah Olympic Oval, but also finished 19th on a 1,000 meter race that weekend. In Heerenveen in January, however, he won his first World Cup race in four years, sharing the win with Gerard van Velde, whose last-pair effort was good enough to tie with Lee's time. He also won a B group race during that World Cup event, and finished third on the 1,000 meters behind two Dutchmen. A week later, Lee recorded his best placing at a World Sprint championship, though he finished sixth and further behind the winner than he had been the previous year. His best placing in an individual race was fifth on the first 500 meters.

With those results, Lee went into the Olympics, and started on three distances, 500, 1,000 and 1,500 meters. On the 500, Lee finished the first run in fifth, setting a personal best of 34.74 and finishing 0.13 seconds behind leader Hiroyasu Shimizu, but could only register the 10th-best time the following day and finished in fifth place. He finished in eighth place on both the 1,000 meters and the 1,500 meters, though on the latter he was within half a second of a medal. Lee finished off the season with three top-ten placings at the World Cup finals in Inzell, which secured eighth place in the overall 500 metre World Cup.

In 2003, Lee again put in consistent placings between 4 and 11 in the World Cup, except for the 100 metre event in Inzell where he finished 24th. His only showing on the 1500 metres in the World Cup ended with 1:48.78 and fourth place in Heerenveen in March; however, in Berlin a week later, he finished 24th and last on the distance during the World Single Distance Championships. In January, he had repeated last season's sixth place in the World Sprint Championships, though the distance to winner Wotherspoon grew to 1.8 points, and at the Asian Winter Games in Aomori, he won gold on both the 1000 and 1500 metre event, pipping Hiroyasu Shimizu by 0.05 seconds on the 1000 metres.

2004 was another weak season for Lee. In November, he skated trial races in Calgary, and finished with times above 36 seconds on 500 metres and 1:11 on 1000 metres, well behind his personal bests. On the 500 metres he was relegated into the B group of the World Cup, despite skating better times than in the test races (around 35.8 seconds), and at the Sprint World Championships he finished 20th, though he was still the best Korean. The Single Distance Championships was slightly better, with 13th (500) and 15th place (1000), but he was well behind the leaders.

The 2005 season started in a similar vein: he finished 19th during the first 1000-metre World Cup race in Nagano, though he was 11th on the 500 metres. However, the following day, he improved by 1.8 seconds on his first 1000-metre time, and then watched seven pairs of skaters fail to beat his time, though Dutchman Beorn Nijenhuis in the last pair came within 0.01 seconds of beating it. He could not repeat the performance in the remainder of the season, with two ninth-placings in Calgary as best, and finished 15th in the overall 1000 metre World Cup. He improved to 11th in the World Sprint Championships, but during the World Single Distance Championships he failed to place in the top 20 of 24 skaters on any distance.

=== 2006 and beyond ===
Lee took part in his fourth Olympic Games in Turin, and showed strength by winning a 1000-metre test race in Calgary in 1:08.77, close to his personal best. He later lowered it during the World Cup in Salt Lake City, skating a new personal best of 1:08.16 to finish fifth, and he also came fourth in a race in Turin two months before the Games, 0.14 behind winner Dmitry Dorofeyev, though in a race without world record holder Shani Davis. In January, Lee used strong 1000 metre times to finish fourth overall at the World Sprint Championships, despite 13th and 14th places on the 500 metre races, and another fourth place came at the Turin Olympics. Lee skated in the penultimate pair, and had the bronze when he finished, but Dutchman Erben Wennemars finished 0.05 ahead to beat the Korean.

The 2007 season, his 14th in international speed skating, became Lee's best. At the first World Cup meet of the season in Thialf, Lee won the first 1000 metres and placed second and third in the 500 metre races, and led the 1000 metre World Cup after one weekend. He then won a 500-metre race in Berlin Sportforum, thus taking the lead in both sprint distance cups before the sprinters travelled to Asia.

In Harbin, China, Lee stretched his run of podium places in 500 and 1000 metre races to 11, and won three of the four races – both 1000 metres, in the absence of World Cup third and Olympic gold medallist Shani Davis, as well as a 500-metre race tied with Keiichiro Nagashima. Lee remained in the lead in both sprint World Cups, but after fourth and sixth places in M-Wave, Nagano, he had to give the 500 metre lead over to Japanese skater Nagashima. Lee was runner-up in both 1000 metre races, though, and led the 1000 metre World Cup by 80 points before the six-week World Cup break.

Lee's next international meet was the 2007 World Sprint Championship in Vikingskipet, Hamar, five weeks after the Nagano World Cup meet. NRC Handelsblad named him as one of the favourites along with Shani Davis, Pekka Koskela and Erben Wennemars. After the first day, Lee trailed Koskela by 0.075 points, having lost 0.31 seconds on the 500 metres. However, Lee lost less on the second day's 500 metre race, and set Koskela the challenge of repeating his time from Saturday to become World Sprint Champion. Koskela arrived 0.13 seconds too late, leaving Lee as the third South Korean world sprint champion, despite not winning a single distance. His placings were fourth, second, third and second.

Lee then travelled to Changchun for the 2007 Winter Asian Games, missing a coinciding World Cup meet in Heerenveen to fall down to fourth place in the 500 metre standings and second place in the 1000 metre standings. In Changchun he enjoyed success, however, winning the 1000 metres by half a second and the 1500 metres by 0.11 seconds as well as taking silver in the 500 metres. He thus became the most-winning male speed skater at the Games.

The return to competitive speed skating in March, for the World Cup final and the World Single Distance Championships, saw Lee's worst placings on the 500 metres in the whole season, with seventh and tenth place at the World Cup final in Calgary causing him to fall to fifth place. He did set a personal best on the 1000 metres, going under 1:08 for the first time in his career, but finished in fourth place, finishing a tenth of a second too late to beat Erben Wennemars in the overall World Cup. This placed him ninth on the distance all-time list. Lee, however, had three wins in the 2007 World Cup season, compared to Wennemars' one, and had a 9–1 record against Wennemars in top level meets, also including the World Sprint Championships. Shani Davis, who finished third in the World Cup standings after skipping four of nine meets, also had three wins and beat Lee in four of six races in the season.

Lee finished off the season with two appearances at the World Single Distance Championships in Utah Olympic Oval. He bettered his personal bests by nearly 0.3 seconds on the 500 metres and 0.4 on the 1000, but still missed the medal in the 500 metres by 0.01 seconds, finishing fourth after a tie with Tucker Fredricks was split on the time in the second race. Lee came back to win bronze in the 1000 metre event, again beaten by Davis as well as Denny Morrison.

Lee continued to be among the top world skaters on the shorter distances in the 2008 season. In the first World Cup race of the season, at the Utah Olympic Oval, Lee skated a new personal best mark with 34.31 seconds, just 0.01 seconds behind the world record before that race, yet was beaten both by compatriot Lee Kang-seok, who thus took the Korean national record, and Jeremy Wotherspoon, who had returned after a 365-day absence. Lee then missed out on Sunday's 1000 metre victory by 0.04 seconds, and despite lowering his personal best to 1:07.07, he ended in third place, advancing to fourth on the all-time list and a Korean record. Fourth places on the other 500 and 1000 metre events of the weekend resulted in third place on aggregate in both World Cup classifications.

Lee picked up podium spots on the 500 m in Heerenveen and Erfurt, and had three successive third-place appearances on the 1000 m, starting with the race in Calgary. However, in Erfurt he fell on Saturday's 1000 m, and on Sunday he placed sixth, his worst finish in an international 1000 m for three seasons.

In the new year, Lee came back strongly. He became world sprint champion despite trailing Jeremy Wotherspoon by 0.365 points after the first day, by winning both distances on the final day. Lee beat Wotherspoon on the 500 m, his only win over Wotherspoon in twelve races, and then faced off with Wotherspoon in the final pair of the 1000 m, with Lee needing to win by 0.53 seconds. With one lap to go, the two were neck and neck, but Lee came from the last inner lane to win the distance by 0.72 seconds and take the overall title.

Lee only got two further podium appearances in the remainder of the season; a third place in the final meet at Heerenveen on the 500 m secured the fourth place overall, and on 1000 m he ended sixth, falling from a second spot overall before the New Year. Like the rest of the Korean squad, though, he skipped the meet in Inzell. The second podium appearance was at the World Single Distance Championships in Japan, two weeks after the World Cup finals, where he took silver on the 2 × 500 metres, half a second behind Wotherspoon.

Lee enjoyed another season near the world top in 2009, finishing on the podium in 9 of 22 international starts, and winning two 500 m races and one 1000 m race. However, he fell in the final race in the world sprint championships, ruining his chance of third successive world sprint title, and was found in fifth in the World Cup standings on both the shorter distances after missing nearly one-third of the season. At the 500 m in the World Single Distance Championship, Lee beat every race winner from earlier in the season, only to be pipped to the title by Lee Kang-seok.

The Olympic 2009–10 season began with two podium appearances on the 500 m in the opening races in Berlin, and in the third World Cup meet of the season, Lee won the Saturday race on the 500 metres with a new personal best of 34.28 seconds. He also finished second on the 1000 metres, though well behind both his personal best and the winner Davis. Two more 500 m race wins in the Utah Olympic Oval, shaving another 0.02 seconds off his personal best, propelled him into second in the overall World Cup standings after 8 of 12 races. In January 2010, Lee was one of the few top skaters who entered the World Sprint Championships in Obihiro, Japan. Lee won both 1000 m races and finished on the podium in the 500 m races, winning the overall title by a margin of nearly one point after four races, the largest margin of victory for eighteen years. He thus became the fourth male skater to win three world sprint titles.

However, Lee was unable to back up his good form in the four pre-Olympic years at the Vancouver Olympics; 9th place on 1000 m and 15th place on 500 m meant that the veteran had his worst Olympic performance since his 1994 debut. He was one of few disappointments in a strong Korean team, which topped the medal table in speed skating; teammate Mo Tae-bum, who had skipped the Obihiro championship, won the 500 m gold.

In December 2010, Lee won his 10th consecutive National Sprint Speed Skating Championships. On January 23, 2011, he won his fourth World Sprint Speed Skating Championships, joining Igor Zhelezovski (six-time World Champion), Eric Heiden (consecutive four times) and Jeremy Wotherspoon among men to win four.

In 2021, Lee signed a contract with IHQ.

== Personal life ==
Lee married actress Son Dam-bi on May 13, 2022, in a private ceremony. Their romantic relationship started in September 2021. On September 26, 2024, Son announced her pregnancy. The couple welcomed a daughter on April 11, 2025.

== Filmography ==
=== Television shows ===
Year	Title	Role	Notes	Ref.
2022	Same Bed, Different Dreams 2: You Are My Destiny	Cast	with Son Dam-bi	

== Records ==
=== Personal records ===
Personal best speedskating results of Lee Kyou-hyuk, data from
Distance	Time	Venue	Date	Note
500 m	34.26	Utah Olympic Oval, Salt Lake City	11 December 2009	
1000 m	1:07.51	Utah Olympic Oval, Salt Lake City	10 March 2007	World Single Distance Championships
1500 m	1:45.20	Olympic Oval, Calgary	15 March 2001	former world record
3000 m	3:54.30	Olympic Oval, Calgary	27 October 2001	
5000 m	7:07.61	Olympic Oval, Calgary	10 March 1996	1996 World Junior Championships
10,000 m	15:32.67	Chichibu Muse-Park, Chichibu	19 December 1992	aged 14

Source: SpeedskatingResults.com

=== World records ===
Event	Time	Date	Venue
1000 m	1:10.42	23 November 1997	Olympic Oval, Calgary
1500 m	1:45.20	16 March 2001	Olympic Oval, Calgary

Source: SpeedSkatingStats.com

== Achievements overview ==
Speedskating achievements of Lee Kyou-hyuk, data from
Year	Winter Olympics	Single Distance WCh	Allround WCh	Sprint WCh	World Cup
1994	36th 500m 32nd 1000m				
1995			NC20	-	36th 1000m
1996					24th 500m 21st 1000m
1997		-	NC21	-	29th 500m 15th 1000m 1 third
1998	8th 500m 13th 1000m	-	-	12th	16th 500m 11th 1000m 1 win
1999		-	-	-	49th 500m 49th 1000m
2000		15th 500m 12th 1000m	-	-	11th 500m 12th 1000m 1 third
2001		5th 500m 4th 1000m	-	9th	6th 500m 4th 1000m 1 second, 1 third
2002	5th 500m 8th 1000m 8th 1500m		-	6th	8th 500m 12th 1000m 27th 1500m 1 win, 1 third
2003		10th 1000m 24th 1500m	-	6th	8th 500m 14th 1000m 22nd 1500m
2004		13th 500m 15th 1000m	-	20th	40th 500m 31st 1000m
2005		21st 500m 22nd 1000m	-	11th	16th 500m 15th 1000m 1 win
2006	4th 1000m 17th 500m		-	4th	17th 500m 17th 1000m 39th 1500m
2007		(bronze) 1000m 4th 500m	-	(gold) Gold	5th 500m 2nd 1000m 5 wins, 4 second, 4 third
2008		(silver) 500m 6th 1000m	-	(gold) Gold	4th 500m 6th 1000m 1 second, 5 third
2009		(silver) 500m 7th 1000m	-	Disqualification	5th 500m 5th 1000m 2 wins, 2 second, 3 third
2010	15th 500m 9th 1000m	-		(gold) Gold	7th 500m 10th 1000m 3 wins, 3 second, 1 third
2011		(gold) 500m 4th 1000m	-	(gold) Gold	(silver) 500m (silver) 1000m 1 win, 5 second, 4 third

- = did not take part
NC# = not qualified for the final distance

Olympic Games
Preceded by Kang Kwang-bae	Flagbearer for South Korea; Sochi 2014	Succeeded by Won Yun-jong (for Korea)
