= Mun Jun =

South Korean speed skater

Personal information
- Born: 14 July 1982 (age 44) South Korea
- Height: 1.83 m (6 ft 0 in)
- Weight: 82 kg (181 lb)

Sport
- Country: South Korea
- Sport: Speed skating
Medal record
Men's speed skating
Representing South Korea
World Sprint Championships
Bronze medal – third place	2008 Heerenveen	Sprint
World Junior Championships
Silver medal – second place	2001 Groningen	All Around
Asian Winter Games
Silver medal – second place	1999 Gangwon	5000 m
Silver medal – second place	2003 Aomori	1500 m
Silver medal – second place	2007 Changchun	1000 m
Bronze medal – third place	1999 Gangwon	10000 m
Bronze medal – third place	2007 Changchun	1500 m

Mun Jun (Korean: 문준; Hanja: 文俊, born 14 July 1982) is a South Korean speed skater. He represented his country at the 2002 Winter Olympics in Salt Lake City. In Salt Lake City where he finished in 19th position that he broke his own record to a new best time of 1.48.58.

In his second Winter Olympics, 2006 Winter Olympics in Turin, he competed at 1000m and 1500m. He finished 24th at the 1000m and 16th at the 1500m.

== Personal records ==
- 500m — 34.43 (16 November 2007, Calgary)
- 1000m — 1:07.11 (11 November 2007, Salt Lake City)
- 1500m — 1:45.58 (16 November 2007, Calgary)
- 3000m — 4:00.07 (3 March 2002, Ritten)
- 5000m — 6:44.93 (17 November 2002, Erfurt)
- 10000m — 14:42.76 (3 December 2000, Harbin)
