= Ko Hyon-suk =

North Korean speed skater (born 1985)

Personal information
- Born: 21 March 1985 (age 40) North Korea
- Height: 157 cm (5 ft 2 in)
- Weight: 56 kg (123 lb)

Korean name
- Hangul: 고현숙
- RR: Go Hyeonsuk
- MR: Ko Hyŏnsuk

Sport
- Country: North Korea
- Sport: Speed skating
- Event: 2010 Winter Olympics

Ko Hyon-suk (Korean: 고현숙; born 21 March 1985) is a speed skater who competed for North Korea at the 2010 Winter Olympics as well as at the 2007 and 2011 Asian Winter Games.
