= An Weijiang =

Chinese speed skater

An Weijiang (also Weijiang An) (born 27 August 1983) is a speed skater. He has participated in the 2006 Olympics for China.

== Achievements ==
- World Sprint Speed Skating Championships for Men (2 participations):
  - 2006, 2008
    - Best result 11th in 2008

== Personal records ==
Personal records
Men's Speed skating
Event	Result	Date	Location	Notes
500 m	34.67	2007-11-16	Calgary	
1,000 m	1:09.44	2007-11-11	Salt Lake City	
1,500 m	1:49.83	2007-08-12	Calgary	
