= Choi Seung-yong (speed skater) =

South Korean speed skater (born 1980)

Choi Seung-yong (최승용)
Personal information
- Born: 6 February 1980 (age 46) Seoul, South Korea
- Height: 1.60 m (5 ft 3 in)
- Weight: 58 kg (128 lb)

Sport
- Country: South Korea
- Sport: Speed skating

Achievements and titles
- Personal bests: 500 m - 38.21; 1000 m - 1:17.50; 1500 m - 2:05.90; 3000 m - 4:41.33

Choi Seung-yong (Korean: 최승용, born 6 February 1980) is a South Korean female speed skater. She competed at the 1998, 2002 and 2006 edition of Winter Olympics. She qualified for the Olympic in 1998, in which she placed both 24th in 500 m and 1000 m. She again qualified for the Olympics in 2002, and placed 18th in the 500 m and 32nd in the 1000 m. Her last Olympic ended up 18th in 500m.

== Personal Records ==
Personal records
Women's Speed skating
Event	Result	Date	Location	Notes
500 m	38.21	November 20, 2005	(United States); Salt Lake City	
1,000 m	1:17.50	November 16, 2002	(Canada); Calgary	
1,500 m	2:05.90	November 1, 2003	(Canada); Calgary	
3,000 m	4.41.33	October 21, 2003	(Canada); Calgary	
