= Wang Beixing =

Chinese speed skater

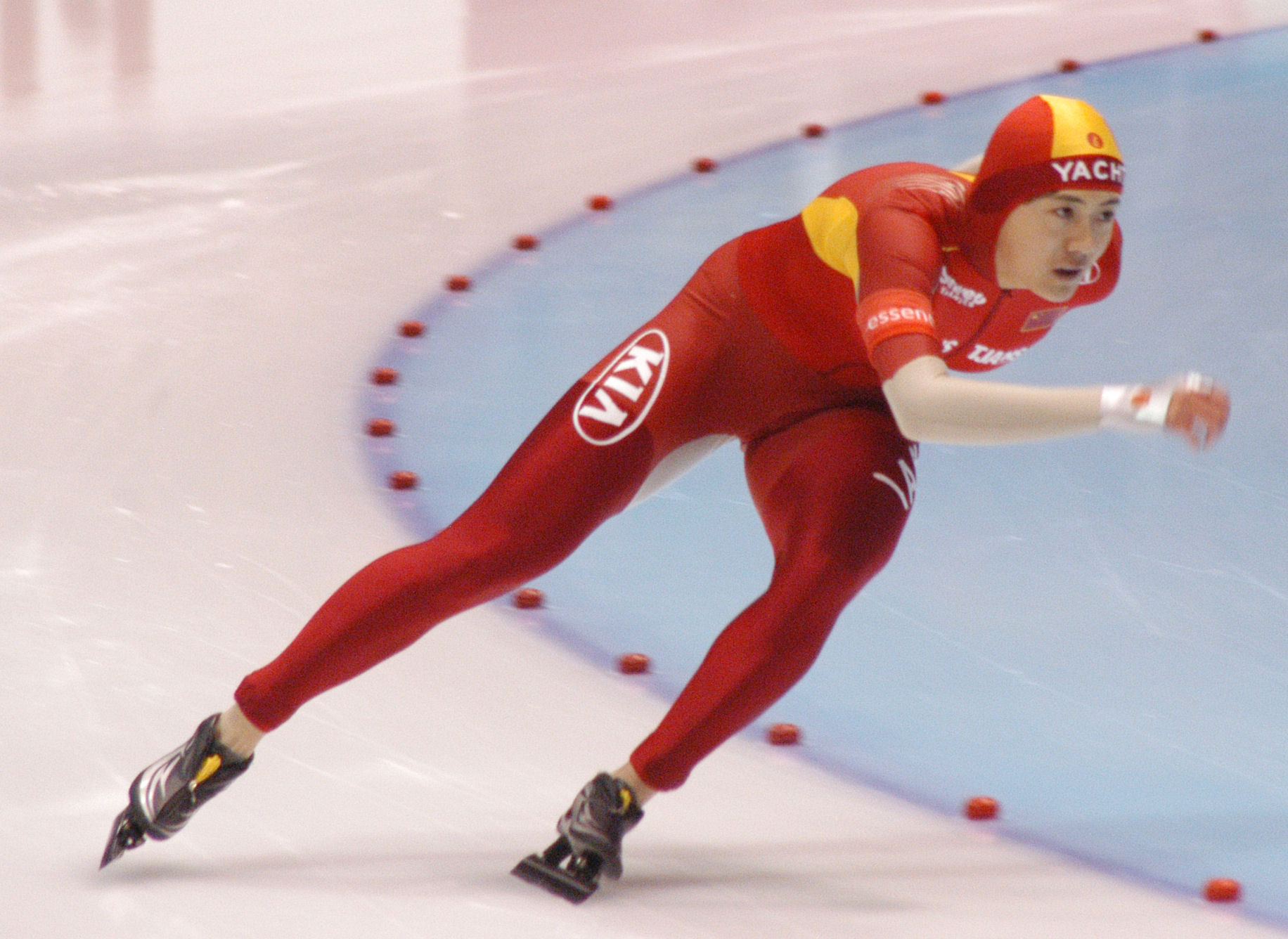
- Wang in 2007

Personal information
- Born: 10 March 1985 (age 41) Heilongjiang
- Height: 1.74 m (5 ft 9 in)
- Weight: 66 kg (146 lb)

Sport
- Sport: Speed skating
Medal record
Women's speed skating
Representing China
Olympic Games
Bronze medal – third place	2010 Vancouver	500 m
World Championships
Gold medal – first place	2009 Moscow	Sprint
Silver medal – second place	2005 Inzell	500 m
Silver medal – second place	2007 Salt Lake City	500 m
Silver medal – second place	2008 Nagano	500 m
Silver medal – second place	2009 Vancouver	500 m
Silver medal – second place	2013 Sochi	500 m
Bronze medal – third place	2011 Inzell	500 m
Asian Winter Games
Gold medal – first place	2007 Changchun	500 m
Gold medal – first place	2007 Changchun	1000 m
Silver medal – second place	2007 Changchun	100 m
Silver medal – second place	2011 Astana-Almaty	500 m
- Updated on 11 February 2014

Wang Beixing (Chinese: 王北星; pinyin: Wáng Běixīng; born 10 March 1985) is a Chinese long track speed skater, specializing in short distances (500 m and 1000 m).

Wang first competed in 2003. Her breakthrough came in the 2004–05 season, winning several times in the World Cup B-group and competing in the A-group. At the World Single Distance Championships she won silver. She appeared to be a medal candidate at the 2006 Winter Olympics in Turin. She got a 7th place in the 500 m and a 29th in the 1000 m.

In January 2009, she won the World Sprint Championships, the first Chinese woman to do so since Ye Qiaobo in 1993. She won the bronze medal in the 500 m sprint at the 2010 Vancouver Winter Olympics.

She was formerly coached by retired Canadian Olympic medallist and former world record holder Kevin Overland.

== Personal records ==
Personal records
Women's speed skating
Event	Result	Date	Location	Notes
500 m	36.85	15 November 2013	Utah Olympic Oval, Salt Lake City	
1000 m	1:13.98	11 November 2007	Utah Olympic Oval, Salt Lake City	
1500 m	1:59.76	29 September 2007	Olympic Oval, Calgary	
3000 m	4:33.08	25 October 2003	Olympic Oval, Calgary	
