= Zhang Shuang (speed skater) =

Chinese speed skater

Personal information
- Born: 10 September 1986 (age 39) Heilongjiang
- Height: 171 cm (5 ft 7 in)
- Weight: 70 kg (154 lb)

Sport
- Sport: Speed skating
Medal record
Women's speed skating
Representing China
Asian Winter Games
Bronze medal – third place	2007 Changchun	500 m
Winter Universiade
Silver medal – second place	2009 Harbin	100 m
Bronze medal – third place	2009 Harbin	500 m
- Updated on 11 February 2014

Zhang Shuang (born 10 September 1986) is a Chinese long-track speed skater. She competed for China at the 2010 Winter Olympics in the women's 500 m.

== Personal records ==
Personal records
Women's speed skating
Event	Result	Date	Location	Notes
500 m	38.04	17 November 2007	Olympic Oval, Calgary	
1000 m	1:15.86	18 November 2007	Olympic Oval, Calgary	
1500 m	2:02.98	1 November 2003	Olympic Oval, Calgary	
3000 m	4:41.74	25 October 2003	Olympic Oval, Calgary	
