= Shihomi Shinya =

Japanese speed skater (born 1979)

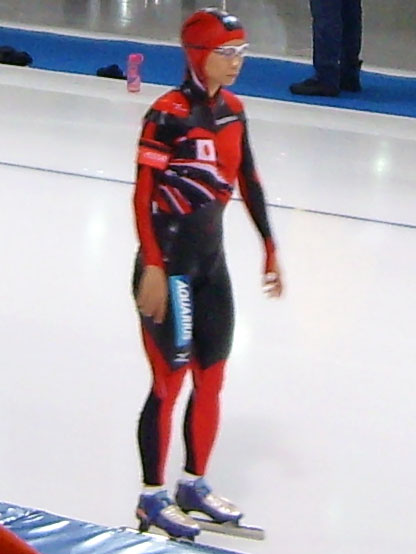
- Shihomi Shinya in 2008

Personal information
- Nationality: Japanese
- Born: 10 August 1979 (age 45); Miyada, Nagano, Japan

Sport
- Sport: Speed skating

Shihomi Shinya (新谷 志保美, Shin'ya Shihomi, born 10 August 1979) is a Japanese speed skater. She competed in the women's 500 metres at the 2010 Winter Olympics.
