= Gao Xuefeng =

Chinese speed skater (born 1980)

Personal information
- Born: March 22, 1980 (age 46) Harbin
- Height: 180 cm (5 ft 11 in)
Medal record
Men's speed skating
Representing China
Asian Games
Silver medal – second place	2007 Changchun	1500 m

Gao Xuefeng (Chinese: 高雪峰, born March 22, 1980) is a Chinese speed skater who competed in the 2006 Winter Olympics in Turin.
