= Zhang Zhongqi =

Chinese speed skater

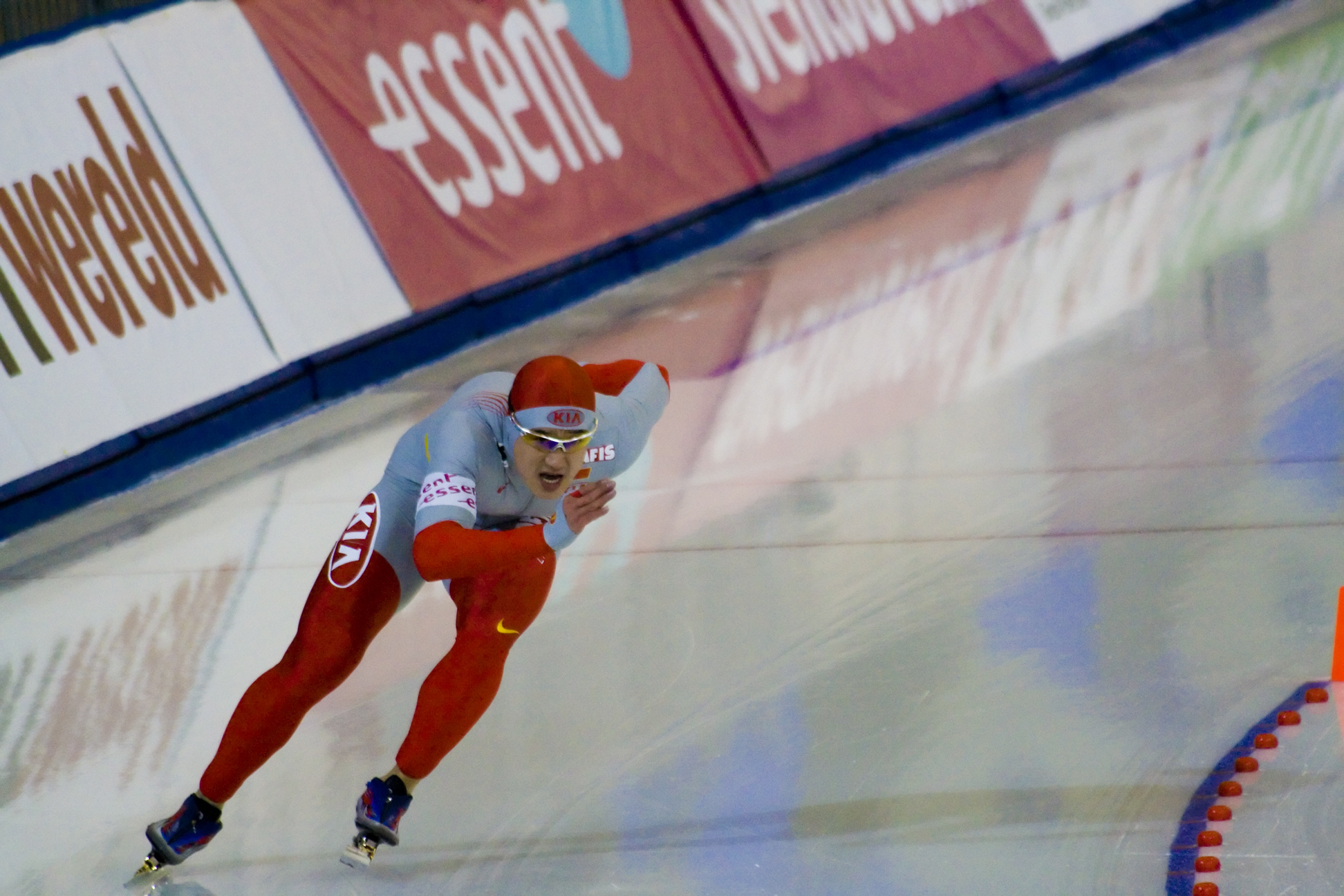
Zhang Zhongqi in 2009.

Zhang Zhongqi (Chinese: 張忠奇, born November 2, 1982) is a long-track speed-skater who represented China at the 2010 Winter Olympics in the Men's 500m.
