= List of Asian Games records in speed skating =

This is the list of Asian Winter Games records in speed skating, current after the 2025 Asian Winter Games.

== Men ==
Event	Time	Athlete	Nation	Games	Date	Ref
100 metres	9.35	Gao Tingyu	China	2025 Harbin	8 February 2025	
500 metres	34.69	Gao Tingyu	China	2017 Sapporo	20 February 2017	
500 metres × 2	1:10.00	Joji Kato	Japan	2011 Astana–Almaty	1 February 2011	
1000 metres	1:08.81	Ning Zhongyan	China	2025 Harbin	11 February 2025	
1500 metres	1:45.85	Ning Zhongyan	China	2025 Harbin	8 February 2025	
5000 metres	6:24.32	Lee Seung-hoon	South Korea	2017 Sapporo	20 February 2017	
10000 metres	13:09.74	Lee Seung-hoon	South Korea	2011 Astana–Almaty	5 February 2011	
Team sprint	1:19.22	Gao Tingyu; Lian Ziwen; Ning Zhongyan	China	2025 Harbin	10 February 2025	
Team pursuit	3:44.32	Joo Hyong-jun; Kim Min-seok; Lee Seung-hoon	South Korea	2017 Sapporo	22 February 2017	

== Women ==
Event	Time	Athlete	Nation	Games	Date	Ref
100 metres	10.38	Xing Aihua	China	2007 Changchun	31 January 2007	
500 metres	37.39	Nao Kodaira	Japan	2017 Sapporo	21 February 2017	
500 metres × 2	1:16.09	Yu Jing	China	2011 Astana–Almaty	1 February 2011	
1000 metres	1:15.19	Nao Kodaira	Japan	2017 Sapporo	20 February 2017	
1500 metres	1:56.07	Miho Takagi	Japan	2017 Sapporo	21 February 2017	
3000 metres	4:05.75	Miho Takagi	Japan	2017 Sapporo	20 February 2017	
5000 metres	7:09.23	Masako Hozumi	Japan	2011 Astana–Almaty	5 February 2011	
Team sprint	1:28.62	Kim Min-ji; Lee Na-hyun; Kim Min-sun	South Korea	2025 Harbin	9 February 2025	
Team pursuit	3:00.08	Misaki Oshigiri; Nana Takagi; Ayano Sato	Japan	2017 Sapporo	21 February 2017	
