= Kazakhstan at the 2007 Asian Winter Games =

- IOC code: KAZ
- NOC: National Olympic Committee of the Republic of Kazakhstan

in Changchun
- Competitors: 104 in 7 sports
- Medals Ranked 4th: Gold 6 Silver 6 Bronze 6 Total 18

Asian Winter Games appearances
- 1996; 1999; 2003; 2007; 2011; 2017; 2025; 2029

Kazakhstan participated in the 2007 Asian Winter Games held in Changchun, China from January 28, 2007, to February 4, 2007.

== Medal summary ==
=== Medal table ===
Medals as of January 29, 2007

Sport	Gold	Silver	Bronze	Total
Cross-country skiing	4	4	2	10
Biathlon	1	1	3	5
Ice Hockey	1	1	0	2
Speed skating	0	0	1	1
Totals (4 entries)	6	6	6	18
