= Mongolia at the 2007 Asian Winter Games =

- IOC code: MGL
- NOC: Mongolian National Olympic Committee

in Changchun
- Competitors: 22
- Medals Ranked 5th: Gold 0 Silver 0 Bronze 1 Total 1

Asian Winter Games appearances
- 1986; 1990; 1996; 1999; 2003; 2007; 2011; 2017; 2025; 2029

Mongolia participated in the 2007 Asian Winter Games, held in Changchun, China from January 28, 2007 to February 4, 2007.

== Medal summary ==
=== Medal table ===
Medals as of January 30, 2007

Sport	Gold	Silver	Bronze	Total
Freestyle skiing	0	0	1	1
Totals (1 entries)	0	0	1	1
