= Japan at the 2007 Asian Winter Games =

- IOC code: JPN
- NOC: Japanese Olympic Committee

in Changchun
- Competitors: 100
- Medals Ranked 2nd: Gold 13 Silver 9 Bronze 14 Total 36

Asian Winter Games appearances
- 1986; 1990; 1996; 1999; 2003; 2007; 2011; 2017; 2025; 2029

Japan participated in the 2007 Asian Winter Games held in Changchun, China from January 28, 2007 to February 4, 2007.

== Medal summary ==
=== Medal table ===
Medals as of January 30, 2007

Sport	Gold	Silver	Bronze	Total
Figure skating	2	1	1	4
Snowboarding	2	1	1	4
Speed skating	1	1	2	4
Cross-country skiing	1	1	0	2
Biathlon	1	0	0	1
Totals (5 entries)	7	4	4	15
