= China at the 2007 Asian Winter Games =

- IOC code: CHN
- NOC: Chinese Olympic Committee external link (in Chinese and English)

in Changchun
- Competitors: 159 in 10 sports
- Medals Ranked 1st: Gold 19 Silver 19 Bronze 23 Total 61

Asian Winter Games appearances
- 1986; 1990; 1996; 1999; 2003; 2007; 2011; 2017; 2025; 2029

China hosted the 2007 Asian Winter Games which were held in Changchun from January 28, 2007, to February 4, 2007.

== Medal summary ==
=== Medal table ===
Sport	Gold	Silver	Bronze	Total
Biathlon	5	5	3	13
Speed skating	5	4	3	12
Short track speed skating	4	3	5	12
Figure skating	2	3	3	8
Freestyle skiing	2	2	2	6
Cross country skiing	1	1	3	5
Snowboarding	0	1	1	2
Curling	0	0	2	2
Ice hockey	0	0	1	1
Totals (9 entries)	19	19	23	61

== Participation details ==
The host country is sending a delegation of 159 athletes competing in all the scheduled events.

=== Results by event ===
==== Alpine skiing ====
===== Entry list =====
- Cang Song
- Dong Jinzhi
- Li Guangxu
- Li Lei
- Liu Jing
- Liu Peihua
- Liu Rui
- Li Yang
- Miao Liyan
- Qin Xiuye
- Ren Zhipeng
- Tian Yuheng
- Xia Lina
- Yin Hhuanhuan
- Zhang Honglei
- Zheng Min

==== Biathlon ====
===== Entry list =====
- Chen Haibin
- Dong Xue
- Kong Yingchao
- Liu Xianying
- Ren Long
- Tian Ye
- Wang Chunli
- Yin Qiao
- Zhang Chengye
- Zhang Qing

==== Cross country skiing ====
===== Entry list =====
- Wang Chunli
- Wang Songtao
- Xia Wan
- Zhang Chengye
- Zhang Qing
- Bian Wenyou
- Han Dawei
- Hou Yuxia
- Huo Li
- Li Geliang
- Li Hongxue
- Liu Yuanyuan
- Ma Dandan
- Song Bo
- Sun Qinghai

==== Figure skating ====
===== Entry list =====
- Zhao Hongbo
- Shen Xue
- Li Jiaqi
- Xu Jiankun
- Suo Bin
- Liu Lu

==== Freestyle skiing ====
===== Entry list =====
- Li Ke
- Qiu Sen
- Guo Xinxin
- Li Nina
- Han Xiaopeng
