= 2007 Asian Winter Games =

Multi-sport event in Changchun, China

VI Asian Winter Games
- Host city: Changchun, Jilin, China
- Motto: Charming Changchun
- Nations: 25
- Athletes: 796 estimated
- Events: 47 in 5 sports
- Opening: January 28, 2007
- Closing: February 4, 2007
- Opened by: Hu Jintao; President of China (Note: OCA states Hu Jintao opened the Games as "President", de jure head of state. Though Hu Jintao was also de facto ruler as General Secretary of the Chinese Communist Party, that title is not reflected in OCA records.)
- Athlete's Oath: Li Ye
- Judge's Oath: Yang Jiasheng
- Torch lighter: Li Jiajun
- Main venue: Changchun Wuhuan Gymnasium
- Website: changchun2007.org (archived)

Summer

Winter

The 6th Asian Winter Games (第六届亚洲冬季运动会), also known as Changchun 2007 (长春2007), were held in Changchun, Jilin, China from January 28 to February 4, 2007. The Winter Games are a celebration of Winter sports in Asia. This was the second time that China hosted the Asian Winter Games; the first was in Harbin, Heilongjiang in 1996.

== Preparation ==
Preparation for the games began four years before the event. In the months leading up to the games the preparation was led by the Acting Governor of Jilin, Han Changbin.

== Mascot ==
Lulu, the mascot

The 2007 Winter Asiad mascot was Lulu, a deer seen around Changchun commonly. It is a species of the sika deer, a native of East Asia. In the Chinese culture, this deer is considered to be a symbol of good luck and fortune. It is said to feature a mild temper, a sporty spirit and quick response. Lulu was expected to represent the welcoming smile of the Changchunans.

== Emblem ==
Combining the movements of a ski jumper and a short-track speed skater, the emblem of the 2007 Asian Winter Games consisted of two Chinese calligraphy strokes. The blue C-shaped stroke called to mind the first letter of Changchun and represented the city's characteristic as the "city of ice and snow" and "city of science and technology". The bottom green stroke symbolized peace ("friendship first, competition second") and represented the city's characteristic as the "city of everlasting spring" and "city of the forest". The emblem presented an image of "change with each passing day" and "the hawk takes to the vast sky."

== Sports ==
A total of 47 medal events in ten sports and disciplines were in contention in the Sixth Winter Asian Games.

- Alpine skiing (4)
- Biathlon (7)
- Cross-country skiing (6)
- Curling (2)
- Figure skating (4)
- Freestyle skiing (2)
- Ice hockey (2)
- Short-track speed skating (8)
- Snowboarding (2)
- Speed skating (10)

== Participating nations ==
The sixth edition marked the first time that all members of the Olympic Council of Asia sent delegations to the Winter Asiad. The following are the 25 National Olympic Committees which competed, with the number of competitors they fielded:

Seven figure skaters from Kuwait, Malaysia, Macau and a speed skater from Turkmenistan were not allowed to compete as their respective nations were not members of the International Skating Union. However, competitors were later allowed to compete, but their results were not allowed to count towards the official rankings.

- Afghanistan (3)
- China (159)
- Chinese Taipei (14)
- Hong Kong (26)
- India (5)
- Iran (14)
- Japan (112)
- Jordan (3)
- Kazakhstan (104)
- Kuwait (22)
- Kyrgyzstan (5)
- Lebanon (3)
- Macau (26)
- Malaysia (21)
- Mongolia (23)
- Nepal (2)
- North Korea (66)
- Pakistan (7)
- Palestine (1)
- Philippines (5)
- South Korea (118)
- Tajikistan (3)
- Thailand (23)
- United Arab Emirates (19)
- Uzbekistan (11)

Non-competing nations

The following only sent non-competing delegations:

- Bahrain
- Bangladesh
- Bhutan
- Brunei
- Cambodia
- Indonesia
- Iraq
- Laos
- Maldives
- Myanmar
- Oman
- Qatar
- Saudi Arabia
- Singapore
- Sri Lanka
- Syria
- Timor-Leste
- Turkmenistan
- Vietnam
- Yemen

== Venues ==
There were six main venues for 47 contested events:

- Beida Lake Skiing Resort - Alpine skiing, biathlon, freestyle skiing, snowboarding
- Changchun Wuhuan Gymnasium - Opening ceremonies, closing ceremonies, figure skating, short-track speed skating
- Changchun Municipal Skating Rink - Curling
- Fu'ao Ice Skating Rink - Ice hockey (men's)
- Jilin Province Skating Gymnasium - Ice hockey (women's)
- Jilin Province Speed Skating Gymnasium - Speed skating

== Calendar ==
| ● | Opening ceremony | Event competitions | ● | Event finals | ● | Closing ceremony |

| January / February 2007 | 26th Fri | 27th Sat | 28th Sun | 29th Mon | 30th Tue | 31st Wed | 1st Thu | 2nd Fri | 3rd Sat | 4th Sun | Gold medals |
|---|---|---|---|---|---|---|---|---|---|---|---|
| Alpine skiing | | | | | | 1 | 1 | 1 | 1 | | 4 |
| Biathlon | | | | 2 | 1 | | 2 | 2 | | | 7 |
| Cross-country skiing | | | | | 2 | 2 | | | 2 | | 6 |
| Curling | | | | | | | 2 | | | | 2 |
| Figure Skating | | | | | | | | 1 | 3 | | 4 |
| Freestyle skiing | | | | | | 1 | 1 | | | | 2 |
| Ice hockey | | | | | | | | | 2 | | 2 |
| Short-track speed skating | | | | 2 | 2 | 4 | | | | | 8 |
| Snowboarding | | | | 1 | 1 | | | | | | 2 |
| Speed skating | | | | 2 | 2 | 4 | 2 | | | | 10 |
| Total gold medals | | | | 7 | 8 | 12 | 8 | 4 | 8 | | 47 |
| Ceremonies | | | ● | | | | | | | ● | |
| January / February 2007 | 26th Fri | 27th Sat | 28th Sun | 29th Mon | 30th Tue | 31st Wed | 1st Thu | 2nd Fri | 3rd Sat | 4th Sun | Gold medals |

== Medal table ==
* Host nation (China)

| Rank | Nation | Gold | Silver | Bronze | Total |
|---|---|---|---|---|---|
| 1 | China* | 19 | 19 | 23 | 61 |
| 2 | Japan | 13 | 9 | 14 | 36 |
| 3 | South Korea | 9 | 13 | 11 | 33 |
| 4 | Kazakhstan | 6 | 6 | 6 | 18 |
| 5 | Mongolia | 0 | 0 | 1 | 1 |
| 5 | Uzbekistan | 0 | 0 | 1 | 1 |
| Totals (6 entries) | | 47 | 47 | 56 | 150 |

== Controversies ==
- At the women's 3000-meter short-track speed skating relay award ceremony on January 31, the runner-up South Korean athletes and fans displayed the slogan "Changbai Mountain is Korean territory." The next day, the OCA issued a serious warning to the South Korean delegation. The head of the Asian Department of the Chinese Ministry of Foreign Affairs met with officials of the South Korean Embassy in China to negotiate the matter, after which the officials of the South Korean delegation apologized to China.

== Notes ==
| Preceded by Aomori | Asian Winter Games; Changchun; VI Asian Winter Games (2007) | Succeeded by Astana and Almaty |
