= 1992 World Allround Speed Skating Championships for women =

International speed skating competition

1992 World Allround Speed Skating Championships for Women
- Venue: Thialf, Heerenveen, Netherlands
- Dates: 7–8 March
- Competitors: 32 from 14 nations

Medalist women
1st place, gold medalist(s)		Gunda Kleemann	GER
2nd place, silver medalist(s)		Emese Hunyady	AUT
3rd place, bronze medalist(s)		Seiko Hashimoto	JPN

The 53rd edition of the World Allround Speed Skating Championships for Women took place on 7 and 8 March 1992 in Heerenveen at the Thialf ice rink.

Title holder was Gunda Kleemann from Germany.

== Distance medalists ==
Event	Gold (gold)	Silver (silver)	Bronze (bronze)
500m	Ye Qiaobo	Seiko Hashimoto	Sandra Voetelink
3000m	Gunda Kleemann	Emese Hunyady	Svetlana Boyko
1500m	Emese Hunyady	Gunda Kleemann	Seiko Hashimoto
5000m	Gunda Kleemann	Svetlana Boyko	Carla Zijlstra

== Classification ==
Rank	Skater	Country	Points Samalog	500m	3000m	1500m	5000m
1st place, gold medalist(s)	Gunda Kleemann	Germany	171.651	41.90 (7)	4:22.30 (gold)	2:05.02 (2)	7:23.62 (gold)
2nd place, silver medalist(s)	Emese Hunyady	Austria	172.621	41.54 (4)	4:22.64 (2)	2:04.48 (gold)	7:38.15 (7)
3rd place, bronze medalist(s)	Seiko Hashimoto	Japan	174.489	40.90 (2)	4:30.96 (12)	2:06.34 (3)	7:43.16 (11)
4	Lyudmila Prokasheva	CIS	174.608	42.26 (9)	4:27.73 (8)	2:07.36 (6)	7:32.74 (4)
5	Heike Warnicke-Schalling	Germany	175.684	42.94 (19)	4:24.96 (4)	2:09.06 (14)	7:36.09 (6)
6	Claudia Pechstein	Germany	175.749	43.14 (21)	4:25.93 (6)	2:08.79 (11)	7:33.58 (5)
7	Svetlana Boyko	CIS	176.060	43.96 (31)	4:23.59 (3)	2:10.10 (21)	7:28.03 (2)
8	Lia van Schie	Netherlands	176.139	42.88 (17)	4:27.33 (7)	2:08.24 (9)	7:39.58 (9)
9	Svetlana Bazhanova	CIS	176.201	42.93 (18)	4:30.23 (10)	2:06.57 (4)	7:40.43 (10)
10	Carla Zijlstra	Netherlands	176.387	43.88 (28)	4:24.89 (5)	2:09.97 (19)	7:30.36 (3)
11	Mary Docter	United States	177.316	43.55 (26)	4:29.32 (9)	2:08.85 (12)	7:39.30 (8)
12	Sandra Voetelink	Netherlands	177.364	41.48 (3)	4:34.24 (16)	2:08.21 (8)	7:54.42 (14)
13	Jasmin Krohn	Sweden	178.351	43.16 (22)	4:30.82 (11)	2:09.51 (17)	7:48.85 (12)
14	Ewa Borkowska-Wasilewska	Poland	178.414	42.50 (14)	4:33.86 (14)	2:08.06 (7)	7:55.85 (15)
15	Elena Belci	Italy	179.057	43.06 (20)	4:33.28 (13)	2:10.62 (23)	7:49.11 (13)
16	Ye Qiaobo	China	179.311	40.09 (gold)	4:43.01 (29)	2:06.76 (5)	8:18.00 (16)
NC17	Mihaela Dascălu	Romania	130.893	41.84 (6)	4:34.50 (17)	2:09.91 (18)	–
NC18	Chieko Yoda	Japan	131.759	42.08 (8)	4:37.96 (24)	2:10.06 (20)	–
NC19	Else Ragni Yttredal	Norway	131.861	42.49 (13)	4:37.29 (23)	2:09.47 (16)	–
NC20	Michelle Kline	United States	131.871	42.26 (9)	4:39.03 (27)	2:09.32 (15)	–
NC21	Cerasela Hordobețiu	Romania	131.918	42.30 (11)	4:36.17 (21)	2:10.77 (24)	–
NC22	Yumi Kaeriyama	Japan	132.204	43.17 (23)	4:36.13 (20)	2:09.04 (13)	–
NC23	Mie Uehara	Japan	132.289	43.20 (24)	4:34.06 (15)	2:10.24 (22)	–
NC24	Elke Felicetti	Italy	133.173	43.42 (25)	4:35.72 (19)	2:11.40 (25)	–
NC25	Hanneke de Vries	Netherlands	133.667	43.89 (29)	4:35.17 (18)	2:11.75 (26)	–
NC26	Tara Laszlo	United States	133.993	42.62 (15)	4:44.36 (30)	2:11.94 (27)	–
NC27	Anette Tønsberg	Norway	134.708	43.74 (27)	4:38.87 (26)	2:13.47 (29)	–
NC28	Outi Aunula-Ylä-Sulkava	Finland	134.744	43.90 (30)	4:39.41 (28)	2:12.83 (28)	–
NC29	Marie-France van Helden-Vives	France	136.829	44.46 (32)	4:45.50 (31)	2:14.36 (30)	–
NC30	Natalya Polozkova-Kozlova	CIS	139.578	41.63 (5)	5:30.77 * (32)	2:08.46 (10)	–
NC	Jacqueline Börner	Germany	88.823	42.65 (16)	4:37.04 (22)	DNS	–
NC	Emese Antal	Austria	88.853	42.46 (12)	4:38.36 (25)	DNS	–

DNS = Did not start
* Fell

== Attribution ==
In Dutch
