= Speed skating at the 1992 Winter Olympics – Women's 3000 metres =

Women's 3000 metres at the XVI Olympic Winter Games
- Pictogram for speed skating
- Venue: L'anneau de vitesse
- Dates: February 9, 1992
- Competitors: 26 from 12 nations
- Winning time: 4:19.90

Medalists
1st place, gold medalist(s)		Gunda Niemann-Kleemann; Germany
2nd place, silver medalist(s)		Heike Warnicke; Germany
3rd place, bronze medalist(s)		Emese Hunyady; Austria

The women's 3000 metres in speed skating at the 1992 Winter Olympics took place on 9 February, at the L'anneau de vitesse.

== Records ==
Prior to this competition, the existing world and Olympic records were as follows:

World record	Gunda Niemann-Kleemann (GER)	4:10.80	Calgary, Canada	9 December 1990
Olympic record	Yvonne van Gennip (NED)	4:11.94	Calgary, Canada	23 February 1988

== Results ==
Rank	Pair	Lane	Name	Country	Time	Behind
1st place, gold medalist(s)	6	O	Gunda Niemann-Kleemann	Germany	4:19.90	-
2nd place, silver medalist(s)	1	O	Heike Warnicke	Germany	4:22.88	+2.98
3rd place, bronze medalist(s)	1	I	Emese Hunyady	Austria	4:24.64	+4.74
4	3	I	Carla Zijlstra	Netherlands	4:27.18	+7.28
5	6	I	Svetlana Boyko	Unified Team	4:28.00	+8.10
6	5	O	Yvonne van Gennip	Netherlands	4:28.10	+8.20
7	4	I	Svetlana Bazhanova	Unified Team	4:28.19	+8.29
8	5	I	Jacqueline Börner	Germany	4:28.52	+8.62
9	2	I	Lia van Schie	Netherlands	4:30.57	+10.67
10	11	I	Lyudmila Prokasheva	Unified Team	4:30.76	+10.86
11	8	O	Jasmin Krohn	Sweden	4:31.98	+12.08
12	9	O	Seiko Hashimoto	Japan	4:32.12	+12.22
13	7	I	Yumi Kaeriyama	Japan	4:33.53	+13.63
14	8	I	Elena Belci	Italy	4:34.28	+14.38
15	11	O	Mary Docter	United States	4:34.51	+14.61
16	12	I	Else Ragni Yttredal	Norway	4:36.98	+17.08
17	10	O	Mie Uehara	Japan	4:37.54	+17.61
18	13	I	Cerasela Hordobețiu	Romania	4:38.08	+18.18
19	3	O	Mihaela Dascălu	Romania	4:38.39	+18.48
20	2	O	Anette Tønsberg	Norway	4:38.66	+18.76
21	9	I	Zhang Qing	China	4:39.46	+19.56
22	7	O	Angela Zuckerman	United States	4:41.88	+21.98
23	4	O	Elke Felicetti	Italy	4:44.14	+24.24
24	10	I	Ewa Wasilewska	Poland	4:44.56	+24.66
25	12	O	Michelle Kline	United States	4:45.65	+25.75
26	13	O	Liu Junhong	China	4:49.13	+29.23
