= Speed skating at the 1992 Winter Olympics – Women's 5000 metres =

Women's 5000 metres at the XVI Olympic Winter Games
- Pictogram for speed skating
- Venue: L'anneau de vitesse
- Dates: February 17, 1992
- Competitors: 24 from 11 nations
- Winning time: 7:31.57

Medalists
1st place, gold medalist(s)		Gunda Niemann-Kleemann; Germany
2nd place, silver medalist(s)		Heike Warnicke; Germany
3rd place, bronze medalist(s)		Claudia Pechstein; Germany

The women's 5000 metres in speed skating at the 1992 Winter Olympics took place on 17 February, at the L'anneau de vitesse.

== Records ==
Prior to this competition, the existing world and Olympic records were as follows:

World record	Yvonne van Gennip (NED)	7:14.13	Calgary, Canada	28 February 1988
Olympic record	Yvonne van Gennip (NED)	7:14.13	Calgary, Canada	28 February 1988

== Results ==
Rank	Pair	Lane	Name	Country	Time	Behind
1st place, gold medalist(s)	4	I	Gunda Niemann-Kleemann	Germany	7:31.57	-
2nd place, silver medalist(s)	3	I	Heike Warnicke	Germany	7:37.59	+6.02
3rd place, bronze medalist(s)	5	I	Claudia Pechstein	Germany	7:39.80	+8.23
4	3	O	Carla Zijlstra	Netherlands	7:41.10	+9.53
5	6	I	Lyudmila Prokasheva	Unified Team	7:41.65	+10.08
6	2	O	Svetlana Boyko	Unified Team	7:44.19	+12.62
7	7	I	Svetlana Bazhanova	Unified Team	7:45.55	+13.98
8	5	O	Lia van Schie	Netherlands	7:46.94	+15.37
9	9	O	Seiko Hashimoto	Japan	7:47.65	+16.08
10	6	O	Elena Belci-Dal Farra	Italy	7:50.42	+18.85
11	11	O	Jasmin Krohn	Sweden	7:50.64	+19.07
12	8	I	Yumi Kaeriyama	Japan	7:50.77	+19.20
13	4	O	Mihaela Dascălu	Romania	7:54.03	+22.46
14	10	I	Mie Uehara	Japan	7:54.15	+22.57
15	1	I	Emese Hunyady	Austria	7:56.48	+24.91
16	12	I	Liu Junhong	China	8:04.31	+32.74
17	8	O	Mary Docter	United States	8:04.42	+32.85
18	10	O	Zhang Qing	China	8:04.71	+33.14
19	13	I	Cerasela Hordobețiu	Romania	8:07.16	+35.59
20	7	O	Elke Felicetti	Italy	8:08.44	+36.87
21	2	I	Anette Tønsberg	Norway	8:09.68	+38.11
22	12	O	Else Ragni Yttredal	Norway	8:09.69	+38.12
23	13	O	Tara Laszlo	United States	8:15.00	+43.43
24	9	I	Michelle Kline	United States	8:20.88	+49.31
