= 1991 World Allround Speed Skating Championships for women =

International speed skating competition

1991 World Allround Speed Skating Championships for Women
- Venue: Hamar Stadion, Hamar, Norway
- Dates: 2–3 February
- Competitors: 31 from 15 nations

Medalist women
1st place, gold medalist(s)		Gunda Kleemann	GER
2nd place, silver medalist(s)		Heike Warnicke-Schalling	GER
3rd place, bronze medalist(s)		Lia van Schie	NED

The 52nd edition of the World Allround Speed Skating Championships for Women took place on 2 and 3 February 1991 in Hamar at the Hamar Stadion ice rink.

Title holder was Jacqueline Börner from East Germany.

== Distance medalists ==
Event	Gold (gold)	Silver (silver)	Bronze (bronze)
500m	Ye Qiaobo	Seiko Hashimoto	Yoo Sun-hee
3000m	Gunda Kleemann	Heike Warnicke-Schalling	Lia van Schie
1500m	Gunda Kleemann	Emese Hunyady	Heike Warnicke-Schalling
5000m	Gunda Kleemann	Heike Warnicke-Schalling	Svetlana Boyko

== Classification ==
Rank	Skater	Country	Points Samalog	500m	3000m	1500m	5000m
1st place, gold medalist(s)	Gunda Kleemann	Germany	177.263	42.47 (4)	4:32.00 (gold)	2:09.45 (gold)	7:43.10 (gold)
2nd place, silver medalist(s)	Heike Warnicke-Schalling	Germany	182.324	44.37 (17)	4:38.70 (2)	2:12.42 (3)	7:53.64 (2)
3rd place, bronze medalist(s)	Lia van Schie	Netherlands	183.278	44.27 (16)	4:40.62 (3)	2:13.01 (6)	7:59.02 (5)
4	Seiko Hashimoto	Japan	183.363	41.95 (2)	4:50.81 (17)	2:12.68 (5)	8:07.19 (8)
5	Yvonne van Gennip	Netherlands	183.817	44.62 (21)	4:43.45 (6)	2:12.50 (4)	7:57.90 (4)
6	Svetlana Boyko	Soviet Union	184.372	45.15 (26)	4:41.60 (4)	2:14.55 (7)	7:54.39 (3)
7	Ulrike Adeberg	Germany	184.499	44.14 (13)	4:42.48 (5)	2:14.85 (9)	8:03.29 (6)
8	Natalja Polozkova-Kozlova	Soviet Union	185.449	42.73 (6)	4:47.84 (11)	2:14.56 (8)	8:18.93 (14)
9	Carla Zijlstra	Netherlands	186.059	45.12 (25)	4:44.24 (7)	2:15.08 (10)	8:05.40 (7)
10	Else Ragni Yttredal	Norway	186.079	43.86 (10)	4:45.22 (9)	2:15.22 (11)	8:16.10 (12)
11	Mihaela Dascălu	Romania	186.816	44.22 (15)	4:48.15 (12)	2:15.25 (12)	8:14.88 (10)
12	Yumi Kaeriyama	Japan	187.447	44.45 (18)	4:49.05 (13)	2:15.80 (15)	8:15.56 (11)
13	Elena Belci	Italy	187.689	44.54 (19)	4:46.98 (10)	2:16.96 (18)	8:16.66 (13)
14	Yelena Banadysenko-Mamayeva	Soviet Union	188.619	44.58 (20)	4:49.97 (16)	2:16.31 (16)	8:23.25 (15)
15	Ye Qiaobo	China	190.692	41.85 (gold)	4:54.95 (20)	2:15.34 (13)	9:05.71 (16)
16	Emese Hunyady	Austria	192.091	52.09 * (31)	4:44.51 (8)	2:11.52 (2)	8:07.43 (9)
NC17	Mie Uehara	Japan	137.549	44.03 (11)	4:49.88 (15)	2:15.62 (14)	–
NC18	Michelle Kline	United States	138.794	43.81 (9)	4:55.07 (21)	2:17.42 (19)	–
NC19	Wang Xiuli	China	139.141	42.72 (5)	5:04.20 (30)	2:16.91 (17)	–
NC20	Moira d'Andrea	United States	139.141	44.06 (12)	4:54.03 (19)	2:18.23 (20)	–
NC21	Yoo Sun-hee	South Korea	139.421	42.39 (3)	5:03.03 (28)	2:19.58 (25)	–
NC22	Ewa Borkowska	Poland	139.741	45.15 (26)	4:50.09 (16)	2:18.73 (22)	–
NC23	Sandra Voetelink	Netherlands	140.300	43.64 (7)	5:02.28 * (26)	2:18.84 (23)	–
NC24	Chong Chang-suk	North Korea	140.355	43.69 (8)	5:02.61 (27)	2:18.69 (21)	–
NC25	Jasmin Krohn	Sweden	140.431	45.02 (23)	4:53.97 (18)	2:19.25 (24)	–
NC26	Tama Sundstrom	United States	141.171	44.14 (13)	5:00.55 (25)	2:20.82 (27)	–
NC27	Caroline Maheux	Canada	142.373	44.95 (22)	4:58.88 (23)	2:22.83 (28)	–
NC28	Elke Felicetti	Italy	142.633	45.89 (28)	4:48.94 (24)	2:20.76 (26)	–
NC29	Aneta Rekas	Poland	143.378	45.09 (24)	5:03.53 (29)	2:23.10 (29)	–
NC30	Susan Stewart	Canada	144.330	46.78 (29)	4:57.00 (22)	2:24.15 (30)	–
NC	Petra Becker	Germany	48.230	48.23 (30)	DNS	–	–

DNS = Did not start
* Fell
