= Speed skating at the 1992 Winter Olympics – Women's 1500 metres =

Women's 1500 metres at the XVI Olympic Winter Games
- Pictogram for speed skating
- Venue: L'anneau de vitesse
- Dates: February 12, 1992
- Competitors: 33 from 14 nations
- Winning time: 2:05.87

Medalists
1st place, gold medalist(s)		Jacqueline Börner; Germany
2nd place, silver medalist(s)		Gunda Niemann-Kleemann; Germany
3rd place, bronze medalist(s)		Seiko Hashimoto; Japan

The women's 1500 metres in speed skating at the 1992 Winter Olympics took place on February 12, at the L'anneau de vitesse.

== Records ==
Prior to this competition, the existing world and Olympic records were as follows:

World record	Karin Enke (GDR)	1:59.30	Alma-Ata, Kazakh SSR, Soviet Union	22 March 1986
Olympic record	Yvonne van Gennip (NED)	2:00.68	Calgary, Canada	27 February 1988

== Results ==
Rank	Pair	Lane	Name	Country	Time	Behind
1st place, gold medalist(s)	1	I	Jacqueline Börner	Germany	2:05.87	-
2nd place, silver medalist(s)	6	I	Gunda Niemann-Kleemann	Germany	2:05.92	+0.05
3rd place, bronze medalist(s)	3	I	Seiko Hashimoto	Japan	2:06.88	+1.01
4	11	I	Nataliya Polozkova	Unified Team	2:07.12	+1.25
5	2	I	Monique Garbrecht	Germany	2:07.24	+1.37
6	3	O	Svetlana Bazhanova	Unified Team	2:07.81	+1.94
7	5	O	Emese Hunyady	Austria	2:08.29	+2.42
8	16	I	Heike Warnicke	Germany	2:08.52	+2.65
9	12	O	Carla Zijlstra	Netherlands	2:08.54	+2.67
10	1	O	Lyudmila Prokasheva	Unified Team	2:08.71	+2.84
11	10	O	Mie Uehara	Japan	2:09.33	+3.46
12	4	I	Else Ragni Yttredal	Norway	2:09.38	+3.51
13	12	I	Jasmin Krohn	Sweden	2:09.62	+3.75
14	9	O	Ewa Wasilewska	Poland	2:09.64	+3.77
15	8	O	Mary Docter	United States	2:09.66	+3.78
16	4	O	Lia van Schie	Netherlands	2:09.70	+3.83
17	2	O	Mihaela Dascălu	Romania	2:09.87	+4.00
18	6	O	Sandra Voetelink	Netherlands	2:10.31	+4.44
19	11	O	Elena Belci-Dal Farra	Italy	2:10.75	+4.88
19	9	I	Yumi Kaeriyama	Japan	2:10.75	+4.88
21	17	O	Bonnie Blair	United States	2:10.89	+5.02
22	7	O	Chong Chang-suk	North Korea	2:11.06	+5.19
23	10	I	Zhang Qing	China	2:11.26	+5.39
24	8	I	Liu Junhong	China	2:11.61	+5.74
25	13	O	Yelena Lapuga	Unified Team	2:11.72	+5.85
26	7	I	Angela Zuckerman	United States	2:13.21	+7.34
27	14	I	Tara Laszlo	United States	2:13.35	+7.48
28	13	I	Cerasela Hordobețiu	Romania	2:14.69	+8.82
29	16	O	Kim Chun-wol	North Korea	2:14.87	+9.00
30	15	O	Edel Therese Høiseth	Norway	2:14.93	+9.06
31	17	I	Song Hwa-son	North Korea	2:15.87	+10.00
32	I	Krisztina Egyed	Hungary	2:21.11	+15.24	
-	5	I	Yvonne van Gennip	Netherlands	DNF	
