= United States at the 1992 Winter Olympics =

- Flag of the United States
- IOC code: USA
- NOC: United States Olympic Committee

in Albertville
- Competitors: 147 (97 men, 50 women) in 6 sports
- Flag bearer: Bill Koch (cross-country skiing)
- Medals Ranked 5th: Gold 5 Silver 4 Bronze 2 Total 11

Winter Olympics appearances (overview)
- 1924; 1928; 1932; 1936; 1948; 1952; 1956; 1960; 1964; 1968; 1972; 1976; 1980; 1984; 1988; 1992; 1994; 1998; 2002; 2006; 2010; 2014; 2018; 2022; 2026

The United States competed at the 1992 Winter Olympics in Albertville, France.

== Competitors ==
The following is the list of number of competitors in the Games.

Sport	Men	Women	Total
Alpine skiing	11	9	20
Biathlon	5	6	11
Bobsleigh	12	–	12
Cross-country skiing	9	8	17
Figure skating	8	8	16
Freestyle skiing	4	4	8
Ice hockey	22	–	22
Luge	6	3	9
Nordic combined	4	–	4
Short track speed skating	1	4	5
Ski jumping	4	–	4
Speed skating	11	8	19
Total	97	50	147

== Medalists ==
The following U.S. competitors won medals at the games. In the by discipline sections below, medalists' names are bolded.

Medal	Name	Sport	Event	Date
Gold	Bonnie Blair	Speed skating	Women's 500 meters	February 10
Gold	Donna Weinbrecht	Freestyle skiing	Women's moguls	February 13
Gold	Bonnie Blair	Speed skating	Women's 1000 meters	February 14
Gold	Cathy Turner	Short track speed skating	Women's 500 meters	February 20
Gold	Kristi Yamaguchi	Figure skating	Women's singles	February 21
Silver	Hilary Lindh	Alpine skiing	Women's downhill	February 15
Silver	Paul Wylie	Figure skating	Men's singles	February 15
Silver	Diann Roffe	Alpine skiing	Women's giant slalom	February 19
Silver	Darcie Dohnal; Amy Peterson; Cathy Turner; Nikki Ziegelmeyer	Short track speed skating	Women's 3000 meter relay	February 20
Bronze	Nelson Carmichael	Freestyle skiing	Men's moguls	February 13
Bronze	Nancy Kerrigan	Figure skating	Women's singles	February 21

Medals by sport
Sport	1st place, gold medalist(s)	2nd place, silver medalist(s)	3rd place, bronze medalist(s)	Total
Speed skating	2	0	0	**2**
Figure skating	1	1	1	**3**
Short track speed skating	1	1	0	**2**
Freestyle skiing	1	0	1	**2**
Alpine skiing	0	2	0	**2**
Total	5	4	2	11

Multiple medalists
Name	Sport	1st place, gold medalist(s)	2nd place, silver medalist(s)	3rd place, bronze medalist(s)	Total
Bonnie Blair	Speed skating	2	0	0	**2**
Cathy Turner	Short track speed skating	1	1	0	**2**

== Alpine skiing ==
Timed events
Men

Athlete	Event	Run 1		Run 2		Total	
Athlete	Event	Time	Rank	Time	Rank	Time	Rank
Reggie Crist	Downhill	—N/a				1:54.54	28
A. J. Kitt	Downhill	—N/a				1:51.98	9
Tommy Moe	Downhill	—N/a				1:53.40	20
Kyle Rasmussen	Downhill	—N/a				1:52.71	16
A. J. Kitt	Super-G	—N/a				1:16.31	23
Tommy Moe	Super-G	—N/a				1:16.54	28
Jeff Olson	Super-G	—N/a				1:15.06	13
Kyle Rasmussen	Super-G	—N/a				1:15.58	17
Matt Grosjean	Giant slalom	1:07.76	27	DNF			
Rob Parisien	Giant slalom	1:07.11	21	1:04.92	22	2:12.03	20
Casey Puckett	Giant slalom	1:08.17	30	1:05.08	24	2:13.25	25
Chris Puckett	Giant slalom	DNF					
Matt Grosjean	Slalom	53.79	14	53.15	10	1:46.94	10
Joe Levins	Slalom	DNF					
Casey Puckett	Slalom	DNF					
Kyle Wieche	Slalom	55.42	29	55.70	24	1:51.12	23

Women

Athlete	Event	Run 1		Run 2		Total	
Athlete	Event	Time	Rank	Time	Rank	Time	Rank
Hilary Lindh	Downhill	—N/a				1:52.61	2nd place, silver medalist(s)
Krista Schmidinger	Downhill	—N/a				1:54.59	12
Edith Thys	Downhill	—N/a				1:58.13	25
Hilary Lindh	Super-G	—N/a				1:25.37	17
Julie Parisien	Super-G	—N/a				DSQ	
Diann Roffe	Super-G	—N/a				DNF	
Eva Twardokens	Super-G	—N/a				1:24.19	8
Julie Parisien	Giant slalom	1:06.90	6	1:07.20	3	2:14.10	5
Diann Roffe	Giant slalom	1:07.21	10	1:06.50	2	2:13.71	2nd place, silver medalist(s)
Edith Thys	Giant slalom	1:09.59		DNF			
Eva Twardokens	Giant slalom	1:07.03	7	1:07.44	7	2:14.47	7
Julie Parisien	Slalom	48.22	1	45.18	8	1:33.40	4
Monique Pelletier	Slalom	50.38	22	46.25	16	1:36.63	18
Eva Twardokens	Slalom	DNF					
Heidi Voelker	Slalom	50.92	25	46.77	20	1:37.69	20

Combined

Athlete	Event	Downhill		Slalom				Total	
Athlete	Event	Time	Points	Time 1	Time 2	Total	Points	Points	Rank
A. J. Kitt	Men's	1:46.29	13.46	DNS				DNF	
Tommy Moe	Men's	1:47.19	22.63	55.03	56.56	1:51.59	59.52	82.15	18
Jeff Olson	Men's	1:48.29	33.84	DNF					
Kyle Rasmussen	Men's	1:46.30	13.56	55.01	55.45	1:50.46	53.14	66.70	16
Kristin Krone	Women's	DNF							
Krista Schmidinger	Women's	1:26.36	6.48	37.66	37.11	1:14.77	45.08	51.56	11

== Biathlon ==
Men

Event	Athlete	Time	Misses	Rank
Duncan Douglas	Individual	1:04:17.5	6	59
Jon Engen	Individual	1:06:18.4	5	70
Curt Schreiner	Individual	1:03:34.2	3	51
Josh Thompson	Individual	1:00:05.4	2	16
Duncan Douglas	Sprint	28:49.2	2	55
Curt Schreiner	Sprint	28:08.4	0	37
Josh Thompson	Sprint	27:53.2	1	32
Erich Wilbrecht	Sprint	28:41.1	2	49
Duncan Douglas; Jon Engen; Curt Schreiner; Josh Thompson	Relay	1:30:44.0	1	13

Women

Event	Athlete	Time	Misses	Rank
Patrice Anderson	Individual	58:59.6	2	42
Nancy Bell-Johnstone	Individual	57:55.2	5	34
Beth Coats	Individual	59:36.1	2	47
Joan Smith	Individual	1:01:15.2	5	55
Joan Guetschow	Sprint	31:30.6	3	64
Nancy Bell-Johnstone	Sprint	28:20.6	3	44
Mary Ostergren	Sprint	27:05.7	2	25
Joan Smith	Sprint	26:54.5	0	21
Nancy Bell-Johnstone; Mary Ostergren; Joan Smith	Relay	1:24:36.9	2	15

== Bobsleigh ==
Athlete	Event	Run 1		Run 2		Run 3		Run 4		Total	
Athlete	Event	Time	Rank	Time	Rank	Time	Rank	Time	Rank	Time	Rank
Brian Shimer; Herschel Walker	Two-man	1:00.34	6	1:01.27	10	1:01.22	8	1:01.12	4	4:03.95	7
Brian Richardson; Greg Harrell	Two-man	1:01.56	24	1:02.15	26	1:02.26	28	1:02.20	22	4:08.17	24
Randy Will; Joe Sawyer; Karlos Kirby; Chris Coleman	Four-man	58.57	10	58.71	3	58.75	10	58.89	8	3:54.92	9
Chuck Leonowiccz; Bob Weissenfels; Bryan Leturgez; Jeff Woodard	Four-man	58.74	12	58.99	13	58.56	2	58.94	12	3:55.23	11

== Cross-country skiing ==
Men

Event	Athlete	Time	Rank
John Aalberg	10 km classical	29:47.6	18
John Bauer	10 km classical	29:58.0	23
John Farra	10 km classical	32:06.0	60
Ben Husaby	10 km classical	30:06.0	26
John Aalberg	15 km freestyle pursuit	42:19.2	26
John Bauer	15 km freestyle pursuit	43:01.7	32
John Farra	15 km freestyle pursuit	44:54.3	49
Ben Husaby	15 km freestyle pursuit	44:41.1	46
Luke Bodensteiner	30 km classical	1:28:45.7	27
John Callahan	30 km classical	1:32:07.9	49
Bill Koch	30 km classical	1:30:41.6	42
Pete Vordenberg	30 km classical	1:32:24.7	51
John Aalberg	50 km freestyle	2:15:33.5	33
Luke Bodensteiner	50 km freestyle	2:18:42.4	43
Jim Curran	50 km freestyle	2:26:17.0	56
Pete Vordenberg	50 km freestyle	2:26:25.8	57
John Aalberg; John Bauer; Luke Bodensteiner; Ben Husaby	4 × 10 km relay	1:48:15.8	12

Women

Event	Athlete	Time	Rank
Ingrid Butts	5 km classical	16:07.9	47
Nancy Fiddler	5 km classical	15:19.2	25
Nina Kemppel	5 km classical	17:12.9	56
Leslie Thompson	5 km classical	16:27.8	52
Ingrid Butts	10 km freestyle pursuit	31:59.7	48
Nancy Fiddler	10 km freestyle pursuit	29:24.9	29
Nina Kemppel	10 km freestyle pursuit	33:56.7	52
Leslie Thompson	10 km freestyle pursuit	31:05.1	41
Dorcas DenHartog-Wonsavage	15 km classical	50:00.5	44
Nancy Fiddler	15 km classical	46:42.4	27
Sue Forbes	15 km classical	49:42.7	41
Brenda White	15 km classical	48:06.0	36
Dorcas DenHartog-Wonsavage	30 km freestyle	1:36:39.8	45
Nancy Fiddler	30 km freestyle	1:33:02.5	29
Brenda White	30 km freestyle	1:37:54.0	49
Betsy Youngman	30 km freestyle	1:36:12.1	43
Ingrid Butts; Nancy Fiddler; Leslie Thompson; Betsy Youngman	4 × 5 km relay	1:04:48.5	13

== Curling ==
Curling was a demonstration sport at the 1992 Winter Olympics.

United States
Superior CC, Superior

Fourth: Tim Somerville
Third: Mike Strum
Skip: Bud Somerville
Lead: Bill Strum
Alternate: Bob Nichols

== Figure skating ==
Individual

Athlete	Event	SP	FS	Total	
Athlete	Event	Rank	Rank	TFP	Rank
Todd Eldredge	Men's	9	11	15.5	10
Christopher Bowman	Men's	7	4	7.5	4
Paul Wylie	Men's	3	2	3.5	2nd place, silver medalist(s)
Tonya Harding	Ladies'	6	4	7.0	4
Nancy Kerrigan	Ladies'	2	3	4.0	3rd place, bronze medalist(s)
Kristi Yamaguchi	Ladies'	1	1	1.5	1st place, gold medalist(s)

Mixed

Athlete	Event	CD1	CD2	SP / OD	FS / FD	Total	
Athlete	Event	Rank	Rank	Rank	Rank	TFP	Rank
Jenni Meno; Scott Wendland	Pairs	—N/a		12	9	15.0	11
Calla Urbanski; Rocky Marval	Pairs	—N/a		7	11	14.5	10
Natasha Kuchiki; Todd Sand	Pairs	—N/a		6	6	9.0	6
Rachel Mayer; Peter Breen	Ice dancing	14	14	14	15	29.0	15
April Sargent-Thomas; Russ Witherby	Ice dancing	10	10	11	11	21.6	11

== Freestyle skiing ==
Men

Athlete	Event	Qualification			Final		
Athlete	Event	Time	Points	Rank	Time	Points	Rank
Bob Aldighieri	Moguls	36.44	20.61	23	Did not advance		
Nelson Carmichael	Moguls	31.50	23.90	4 Q	32.05	24.82	3rd place, bronze medalist(s)
Chuck Martin	Moguls	34.33	22.59	14 Q	32.70	20.77	15
Craig Rodman	Moguls	33.31	22.25	16 Q	35.21	21.18	13

Women

Athlete	Event	Qualification			Final		
Athlete	Event	Time	Points	Rank	Time	Points	Rank
Ann Battelle	Moguls	43.99	14.51	21	Did not advance		
Maggie Connor	Moguls	43.08	13.95	22	Did not advance		
Liz McIntyre	Moguls	38.71	22.60	4 Q	40.27	21.24	6
Donna Weinbrecht	Moguls	39.81	23.48	2 Q	40.51	23.69	1st place, gold medalist(s)

== Ice hockey ==
Summary

Team	Event	First round						Quarterfinal	Semifinal	Final / BM	
Team	Event	Opposition Score	Opposition Score	Opposition Score	Opposition Score	Opposition Score	Rank	Opposition Score	Opposition Score	Opposition Score	Rank
United States men's	Men's tournament	Italy; W 6–3	Germany; W 2–0	Finland; W 4–1	Poland; W 3–0	Sweden; T 3–3	1 Q	France; W 4–1	Unified Team; L 2–5	Bronze medal final Czechoslovakia; L 1–6	4

Roster

- Ray LeBlanc
- Scott Gordon
- Greg Brown
- Guy Gosselin
- Sean Hill
- Scott Lachance
- Dave Tretowicz
- Moe Mantha
- Clark Donatelli
- Ted Donato
- Ted Drury
- David Emma
- Steve Heinze
- Jim Johannson
- Shawn McEachern
- Marty McInnis
- Joe Sacco
- Tim Sweeney
- C. J. Young
- Scott Young
- Head Coach: Dave Peterson

First round
Twelve participating teams were placed in two groups. After playing a round-robin, the top four teams in each group advanced to the Medal Round while the last two teams competed in the consolation round for the 9th to 12th places.

Pos	Team	Pld	W	D	L	GF	GA	GD	Pts	Qualification
1	United States	5	4	1	0	18	7	+11	9	Quarterfinals
2	Sweden	5	3	2	0	22	11	+11	8	Quarterfinals
3	Finland	5	3	1	1	22	11	+11	7	Quarterfinals
4	Germany	5	2	0	3	11	12	−1	4	Quarterfinals
5	Italy	5	1	0	4	18	24	−6	2	consolation round
6	Poland	5	0	0	5	4	30	−26	0	consolation round

Source: Olympedia

9 February 1992; 20:15	United States	6–3 (2–1, 0–2, 4–0)	Italy	Méribel Ice Palace, Méribel; Attendance: 5,445

Ray LeBlanc
Goalies
David Delfino
Referee:
(Finland) Seppo Makela
Linesmen:
(France) Jean-Phillippe Ollier
(Germany) Richard Schutz

M. Mantha (S. Heinze, C. J. Young) — 2:31	1–0
J. Johansson (T. Drury, K. Tkachuk) — 7:18	2–0
	2—1	18:12 — B. Zarrillo (B. Stewart) (PP)
	2—2	38:45 — J. Foglietta (M. De Angelis, T. Circelli)
	2—3
C. Donatelli (T. Sweeney) — 41:41	3—3
S. Heinze (T. Donato) — 47:02	4—3
T. Sweeney — 48:37	5—3
C. J. Young (T. Sweeney) (PP) — 53:41	6—3

12 min
Penalties
16 min
37
Shots
23

11 February 1992; 13:00	Finland	9–1 (4–0, 1–0, 4–1)	Poland	Méribel Ice Palace, Méribel; Attendance: 2,953

Jukka Tammi
Goalies
Marek Batkiewicz
Referee:
(Germany) Bernhard Schneider
Linesmen:
(Czechoslovakia) Miloš Benek
(France) Jean-Phillippe Ollier

T. Jutila (S. Saarinen, M. Mäkelä) (PP) — 2:41	1–0
R. Helminen (P. Skriko, M. Mäkelä) (PP) — 15:20	2–0
R. Summanen (J. Lindroos, P. Tuomisto) — 17:28	3—0
M. Mäkelä (J. Laukkanen, T. Jutila) — 18:36	4—0
H. Järvenpää (V. Sirén, M. Nieminen) — 37:32	5—0
M. Mäkelä (M. Nieminen, H. Järvenpää) (PP) — 45:32	6—0
	6—1	54:46 — M. Puzio (A. Świstak, R. Sroka)
T. Selänne (H. Järvenpää, M. Nieminen) (PP) — 56:09	7—1
P. Tuomisto (J. Lindroos) — 56:57	8—1
T. Selänne (A. Ruotanen, M. Nieminen) — 59:19	9—1

12 min
Penalties
16 min
28
Shots
16

11 February 1992; 16:30	United States	2–0 (0–0, 1–0, 1–0)	Germany	Méribel Ice Palace, Méribel; Attendance: 6,063

Ray LeBlanc	Goalies	Helmut de Raaf	Referee: (Unified Team at the Olympics) Nikolay Morozov; Linesmen: (Finland) Janne Rautavuori (Sweden) Johan Enestedt
M. McInnis (M. Mantha) (PP) — 25:25 / 1–0; T. Donato (PP) — 51:58 / 2–0			Referee: (Unified Team at the Olympics) Nikolay Morozov; Linesmen: (Finland) Janne Rautavuori (Sweden) Johan Enestedt
12 min	Penalties	10 min	Referee: (Unified Team at the Olympics) Nikolay Morozov; Linesmen: (Finland) Janne Rautavuori (Sweden) Johan Enestedt
27	Shots	46	Referee: (Unified Team at the Olympics) Nikolay Morozov; Linesmen: (Finland) Janne Rautavuori (Sweden) Johan Enestedt

11 February 1992; 16:30	United States	4–1 (1–0, 1–1, 2–0)	Finland	Méribel Ice Palace, Méribel; Attendance: 6,100

Ray LeBlanc
Goalies
Markus Ketterer
Referee:
(Switzerland) Christian Frey
Linesmen:
(Canada) Jim Carmen
(Unified Team at the Olympics) Shamil Sharikov

C. J. Young (J. Sacco) — 18:44	1–0
	1—1	29:42 — M. Mäkelä (P. Skriko)
T. Sweeney (C. J. Young, C. Donatelli) — 33:55	2—1
S. Hill (C. J. Young) (PP) — 49:52	3—1
C. J. Young (SH) — 53:08	4—1

6 min
Penalties
6 min
25
Shots
30

15 February 1992; 20:15	United States	3–0 (0–0, 2–0, 1–0)	Poland	Méribel Ice Palace, Méribel; Attendance: 6,100

Ray LeBlanc
Goalies
Mariusz Kieca
Marek Batkiewicz
Referee:
(France) Eric Malletroit
Linesmen:
(Czechoslovakia) Miloš Benek
(France) Jean-Christophe Benoist

S. McEachern (S. Young, J. Sacco) — 34:37	1–0
T. Sweeney (S. Lachance) — 37:39	2—0
M. McInnis (S. Heinze) — 53:07	3—0

8 min
Penalties
6 min
37
Shots
24

17 February 1992; 20:15	Sweden	3–3 (0–1, 0–1, 3–1)	United States	Méribel Ice Palace, Méribel; Attendance: 6,100

Roger Nordström
Goalies
Ray LeBlanc
Referee:
(Finland) Seppo Makela
Linesmen:
(Germany) Richard Schutz
(Canada) Jim Carmen

	0—1	46:21 — T. Sjödin (H. Loob)
	0—2	53:25 — H. Loob (T. Rundqvist)
	0—3	59:39 — M. Johansson
C. Donatelli (T. Sweeney) — 0:36	1—3
T. Donato (T. Sweeney) — 27:18	2—3
M. McInnis (T. Donato) — 42:42	3—3

31 min
Penalties
16 min
48
Shots
19

Quarterfinal

19 February 1992; 17:00	Unified Team	6–1 (2–1, 2–0, 2–0)	Finland	Méribel Ice Palace, Méribel; Attendance: 6,100

Mikhail Shtalenkov
Andrey Trefilov
Goalies
Jukka Tammi
Referee:
(United States) Donald Adam
Linesmen:
(United States) John Malinovski
(Sweden) Johan Enestedt

N. Borshchevsky (I. Boldin, V. Prokhorov) — 5:42	1—0
	1-1	8:25 — P. Tuomisto (K. Eloranta, J. Lindroos)
A. Khomutov (V. Bykov, Y. Davydov) (PP) — 17:36	2—1
Y. Khmylyov - 34:50	3—1
V. Malakhov (V. Prokhorov, S. Zubov) — 37:12	4—1
V. Bykov (A. Khomutov, D. Kasparaitis) — 47:21	5—1
S. Petrenko (A. Zhamnov, A. Kovalev)	6—1

10 min
Penalties
18 min
36
Shots
31

Semifinal

21 February 1992; 21:00	Canada	4–2 (2–1, 0–1, 2–0)	Czechoslovakia	Méribel Ice Palace, Méribel; Attendance: 6,100

Sean Burke
Goalies
Petr Bříza
Referee:
(United States) Donald Adam
Linesmen:
(Finland) Janne Rautavuori
(Unified Team at the Olympics) Shamil Sharikov

D. Hannan — 1:58	1—0
D. Archibald (J. Woolley, B. Schlegel) — 10:43	2—0
	2—1	19:52 — R. Švehla (R. Žemlička)
	2—2	23:22 — P. Augusta (R. Žemlička, P. Hrbek)
C. Giles (F. Joseph, J. Juneau) — 43:59	3—2
F. Joseph (T. Brost, D. Hannan) — 57:48	4—2

10 min
Penalties
6 min
31
Shots
33

Bronze medal game

22 February 1992; 21:00	Czechoslovakia	6–1 (2–0, 1–0, 3–1)	United States	Méribel Ice Palace, Méribel; Attendance: 6,100

Petr Bříza
Goalies
Ray LeBlanc
Scott Gordon
Referee:
(Canada) Georg McCorry
Linesmen:
(Finland) Janne Rautavuori
(Sweden) Johan Enestedt

F. Procházka (D. Kadlec, R. Lang) — 16:12	1—0
T. Jelínek (L. Lubina, O. Janecký) — 17:23	2—0
K. Kašťák (D. Kadlec) — 25:51	3—0
T. Jelínek (R. Žemlička, L. Gudas) — 42:38	4—0
R. Lang (K. Kašťák) — 43:42	5—0
	5—1	46:55 — T. Drury (D. Emma)
R. Lang (F. Procházka) — 55:59	6—1

6 min
Penalties
8 min
47
Shots
29

== Luge ==
Men

Athlete	Event	Run 1		Run 2		Run 3		Run 4		Total	
Athlete	Event	Time	Rank	Time	Rank	Time	Rank	Time	Rank	Time	Rank
Duncan Kennedy	Singles	45.553	6	45.849	12	45.258	8	46.192	12	3:03.852	10
Robert Pipkins	Singles	47.996	32	45.878	14	46.601	15	46.424	14	3:06.899	21
Wendel Suckow	Singles	45.838	13	45.874	13	46.416	12	46.067	7	3:04.195	12
Tim Wiley	Singles	DNS									
Wendel Suckow; Bill Tavares	Doubles	46.787	9	46.664	7	—N/a				1:33.451	9
Gordy Sheer; Chris Thorpe	Doubles	46.980	12	47.062	12	—N/a				1:34.042	12

Women

Athlete	Event	Run 1		Run 2		Run 3		Run 4		Total	
Athlete	Event	Time	Rank	Time	Rank	Time	Rank	Time	Rank	Time	Rank
Cammy Myler	Singles	46.974	5	47.019	6	46.962	6	46.988	8	3:07.673	5
Erica Terwillegar	Singles	47.094	8	47.124	8	47.210	9	47.119	14	3:08.547	9
Bonny Warner	Singles	47.493	18	47.385	16	47.513	17	47.366	18	3:09.757	18

== Nordic combined ==
Athlete	Event	Ski Jumping					Cross-country		Total	
Athlete	Event	Jump 1	Jump 2	Jump 3	Total	Rank	Time	Rank	Time	Rank
Ryan Heckman	Individual	96.8	99.6	~~95.0~~	196.4	28	50:07.9	37	53:41.9	37
Joe Holland	Individual	~~93.8~~	98.6	107.7	206.3	15	DNF			
Tim Tetreault	Individual	~~96.4~~	96.6	98.9	195.5	29	51:09.6	41	54:49.6	40
Todd Wilson	Individual	84.7	~~78.7~~	92.0	176.7	43	48:36.7	34	54:22.1	39
Ryan Heckman; Joe Holland; Tim Tetreault	Team	—N/a			591.3	4	1:28:15.8	10	1:32:44.8	8

== Short track speed skating ==
Athlete	Event	Heat		Quarterfinal		Semifinal		Final	
Athlete	Event	Time	Rank	Time	Rank	Time	Rank	Time	Final rank
Andy Gabel	Men's 1000 m	DSQ		Did not advance					
Amy Peterson	Women's 500 m	51.05	3	Did not advance					
Cathy Turner	Women's 500 m	47.69	1 Q	48.51	1 Q	47.41	1 QA	47.04	1st place, gold medalist(s)
Darcie Dohnal; Amy Peterson; Cathy Turner; Nikki Ziegelmeyer	Women's 3000 m relay	—N/a				4:42.56	2 Q	4:37.85	2nd place, silver medalist(s)

Qualification legend: FA – Qualify to medal round.

== Ski jumping ==
Athlete	Event	Jump 1			Jump 2			Total	
Athlete	Event	Distance	Points	Rank	Distance	Points	Rank	Points	Rank
Jim Holland	Normal hill	85.0	104.5	13	81.0	96.6	22	201.1	13
Bob Holme	Normal hill	77.0	83.7	53	78.5	87.6	48	171.3	51
Ted Langlois	Normal hill	80.0	91.5	38	83.0	97.3	21	188.8	28
Bryan Sanders	Normal hill	83.5	99.1	21	77.0	85.7	49	184.8	38
Jim Holland	Large hill	105.0	90.0	15	101.5	85.1	13	175.1	12
Bob Holme	Large hill	96.5	71.1	38	92.5	66.0	37	137.1	36
Ted Langlois	Large hill	88.0	57.2	50	90.5	61.2	43	118.4	48
Bryan Sanders	Large hill	90.5	61.2	47	98.5	75.9	24	137.1	36
Jim Holland; Bob Holme; Ted Langlois; Bryan Sanders	Team	—N/a	247.2	12	—N/a	225.2	12	482.4	12

== Speed skating ==
Men

Athlete	Event	Time	Rank
Dave Cruikshank	500 m	38.28	22
Dan Jansen	500 m	37.46	4
Marty Pierce	500 m	38.15	19
Nick Thometz	500 m	37.83	13
Dave Besteman	1000 m	1:16.57	20
Eric Flaim	1000 m	1:16.47	16
Dan Jansen	1000 m	1:17.34	26
Nick Thometz	1000 m	1:16.19	15
Eric Flaim	1500 m	1:59.60	24
Nate Mills	1500 m	2:01.54	35
Chris Shelley	1500 m	2:01.11	32
Brian Wanek	1500 m	1:58.50	19
Eric Flaim	5000 m	7:11.15	6
Mark Greenwald	5000 m	7:21.19	19
Brian Wanek	5000 m	7:13.35	12
Mark Greenwald	10,000 m	15:03.02	24
Jeff Klaiber	10,000 m	15:13.65	27
Brian Wanek	10,000 m	14:51.34	22

Women

Athlete	Event	Time	Rank
Bonnie Blair	500 m	40.33	1st place, gold medalist(s)
Peggy Clasen	500 m	41.95	22
Michelle Kline	500 m	42.41	26
Kristen Talbot	500 m	41.77	17
Bonnie Blair	1000 m	1:21.90	1st place, gold medalist(s)
Peggy Clasen	1000 m	1:25.31	29
Moira D'Andrea	1000 m	1:26.13	32
Michelle Kline	1000 m	DSQ	
Bonnie Blair	1500 m	2:10.89	21
Mary Docter	1500 m	2:09.66	15
Tara Laszlo	1500 m	2:13.35	27
Angela Zuckerman	1500 m	2:13.21	26
Mary Docter	3000 m	4:34.51	15
Michelle Kline	3000 m	4:45.65	25
Angela Zuckerman	3000 m	4:41.88	22
Mary Docter	5000 m	8:04.42	17
Michelle Kline	5000 m	8:20.88	24
Tara Laszlo	5000 m	8:15.00	23

== Demonstration sports ==
=== Curling ===
- Tim Somerville (fourth)
- Mike Strum (third)
- Bud Somerville(skip)
- Bill Strum (lead)
- Bob Nichols (alternate)
