= 1993 World Allround Speed Skating Championships for women =

International speed skating competition

1993 World Allround Speed Skating Championships for Women
- Venue: Sportforum Hohenschönhausen, Berlin, Germany
- Dates: 6–7 February
- Competitors: 31 from 16 nations

Medalist women
1st place, gold medalist(s)		Gunda Kleemann	GER
2nd place, silver medalist(s)		Emese Hunyady	AUT
3rd place, bronze medalist(s)		Heike Warnicke-Schalling	GER

The 54th edition of the World Allround Speed Skating Championships for Women took place on 6 and 7 February 1993 in Berlin at the Sportforum Hohenschönhausen ice rink.

Title holder was Gunda Kleemann from Germany.

== Distance medalists ==
Event	Gold (gold)	Silver (silver)	Bronze (bronze)
500m	Ye Qiaobo	Yoo Sun-hee	Emese Hunyady
3000m	Gunda Kleemann	Heike Warnicke-Schalling	Emese Hunyady
1500m	Gunda Kleemann	Emese Hunyady	Heike Warnicke-Schalling
5000m	Gunda Kleemann	Carla Zijlstra	Heike Warnicke-Schalling

== Classification ==
Rank	Skater	Country	Points Samalog	500m	3000m	1500m	5000m
1st place, gold medalist(s)	Gunda Kleemann	Germany	172.441	41.80 (6)	4:23.15 (gold)	2:06.60 (gold)	7:25.83 (gold)
2nd place, silver medalist(s)	Emese Hunyady	Austria	174.113	41.31 (3)	4:26.59 (3)	2:06.67 (2)	7:41.49 (4)
3rd place, bronze medalist(s)	Heike Warnicke-Schalling	Germany	174.911	42.82 (16)	4:23.64 (2)	2:08.41 (3)	7:33.48 (3)
4	Seiko Hashimoto	Japan	176.855	42.02 (7)	4:33.57 (11)	2:08.94 (4)	7:42.60 (5)
5	Mie Uehara	Japan	178.313	42.58 (12)	4:31.11 (6)	2:10.79 (8)	7:49.52 (7)
6	Mihaela Dascălu	Romania	178.325	41.70 (5)	4:32.69 (9)	2:11.19 (9)	7:54.47 (9)
7	Carla Zijlstra	Netherlands	178.524	44.09 (25)	4:30.56 (5)	2:12.31 (16)	7:32.38 (2)
8	Elena Belci	Italy	179.044	43.91 (23)	4:29.68 (4)	2:11.45 (11)	7:43.72 (6)
9	Claudia Pechstein	Germany	179.439	42.89 (19)	4:32.60 (8)	2:12.40 (17)	7:49.83 (8)
10	Lyudmila Prokasheva	Kazakhstan	181.357	44.07 (24)	4:33.10 (10)	2:12.83 (21)	7:54.95 (10)
11	Miki Ogasawara	Japan	181.553	44.72 (29)	4:31.40 (7)	2:12.15 (15)	7:55.50 (11)
12	Ye Qiaobo	China	183.824	40.41 (gold)	4:43.63 (27)	2:10.76 (10)	8:45.57 (12)
NC13	Ewa Borkowska-Wasilewska	Poland	132.484	42.30 (9)	4:37.43 (20)	2:11.84 (13)	–
NC14	Else Ragni Yttredal	Norway	132.505	42.47 (10)	4:36.45 (16)	2:11.88 (14)	–
NC15	Natalya Polozkova-Kozlova	Russia	132.551	42.19 (8)	4:39.61 (22)	2:11.28 (10)	–
NC16	Chantal Bailey	United States	132.576	42.61 (13)	4:36.62 (18)	2:11.59 (12)	–
NC17	Ingrid Liepa	Canada	132.697	42.76 (15)	4:33.79 (12)	2:12.92 (23)	–
NC18	Emese Dörfler-Antal	Austria	133.014	42.82 (16)	4:36.25 (15)	2:12.46 (18)	–
NC19	Cerasela Hordobețiu	Romania	133.302	42.69 (14)	4:34.72 (13)	2:14.68 (25)	–
NC20	Svetlana Fedotkina	Russia	133.839	42.83 (18)	4:40.84 (24)	2:12.61 (19)	–
NC21	Ingrid van der Voort	Netherlands	133.994	43.43 (21)	4:37.63 (21)	2:12.88 (22)	–
NC22	Angela Zuckerman	United States	134.621	44.18 (26)	4:37.29 (19)	2:12.68 (20)	–
NC23	Yoo Sun-hee	South Korea	135.031	41.26 (2)	4:53.47 (28)	2:14.58 (26)	–
NC24	Tina Huisman	Netherlands	135.311	44.29 (27)	4:36.45 (16)	2:14.84 (29)	–
NC25	Tama Sundstrom	United States	136.371	43.72 (22)	4:43.61 (26)	2:16.15 (30)	–
NC26	Elisabetta Pizio	Italy	136.821	44.71 (28)	4:43.49 (25)	2:14.59 (27)	–
NC27	Xue Ruihong	China	137.053	41.60 (4)	4:58.70 (29)	2:17.01 (31)	–
NC28	Jasmin Krohn	Sweden	139.788	43.30 (20)	5:17.61 * (30)	2:10.66 (6)	–
NC29	Outi Aunula-Ylä-Sulkava	Finland	145.735	54.18 (30)	4:39.69 (13)	2:14.82 (28)	–
NC30	Anette Tønsberg	Norway	160.053	1:09.41 * (31)	4:35.12 (14)	2:14.37 (24)	–
NC	Svetlana Bazhanova	Russia	85.986	42.56 (11)	DQ	2:10.28 (5)	–

DQ = Disqualified
* = Fell

== Attribution ==
In Dutch
