= 1989 World Allround Speed Skating Championships for Women =

International speed skating competition

- Venue: James B. Sheffield Olympic Skating Rink, Lake Placid, New York, United States
- Dates: 4–5 February
- Competitors: 29 from 13 nations

Medalist women
1st place, gold medalist(s)		Constanze Moser-Scandolo	DDR
2nd place, silver medalist(s)		Gunda Kleemann	DDR
3rd place, bronze medalist(s)		Yvonne van Gennip	NED

The 50th edition of the World Allround Speed Skating Championships for Women took place on 4 and 5 February 1989 in Lake Placid at the James B. Sheffield Olympic Skating Rink.

The titleholder is Constanze Moser-Scandolo from East Germany.

== Distance medalists ==
Event	Gold (gold)	Silver (silver)	Bronze (bronze)
500m	Seiko Hashimoto	Ariane Loignon	Constanze Moser-Scandolo
3000m	Constanze Moser-Scandolo	Heike Schalling	Jacqueline Börner
1500m	Yelena Lapuga	Constanze Moser-Scandolo	Gunda Kleemann
5000m	Gunda Kleemann	Constanze Moser-Scandolo	Yvonne van Gennip

== Classification ==
Rank	Skater	Country	Points Samalog	500m	3000m	1500m	5000m
1st place, gold medalist(s)	Constanze Moser-Scandolo	East Germany	181.389	43.33 (3)	4:39.56 (gold)	2:10.91 (2)	7:58.30 (2)
2nd place, silver medalist(s)	Gunda Kleemann	East Germany	182.686	44.19 (10)	4:41.72 (4)	2:11.16 (3)	7:58.23 (gold)
3rd place, bronze medalist(s)	Yvonne van Gennip	Netherlands	183.034	43.59 (6)	4:42.52 (6)	2:13.10 (7)	7:59.92 (3)
4	Mary Docter	United States	184.099	44.78 (18)	4:42.29 (5)	2:12.59 (4)	8:00.75 (4)
5	Jacqueline Börner	East Germany	184.223	44.33 (13)	4:41.00 (3)	2:12.60 (5)	8:08.60 (6)
6	Seiko Hashimoto	Japan	184.554	42.59 (gold)	4:49.15 (13)	2:12.65 (6)	8:15.57 (10)
7	Lyudmila Titova-Morozova	Soviet Union	185.471	44.42 (14)	4:43.59 (7)	2:13.46 (8)	8:13.00 (7)
8	Heike Schalling	East Germany	185.674	45.51 (20)	4:40.36 (2)	2:16.04 (16)	8:00.92 (5)
9	Marieke Stam	Netherlands	186.020	43.43 (4)	4:49.08 (11)	2:14.34 (11)	8:16.30 (11)
10	Yelena Lapuga	Soviet Union	186.111	44.68 (17)	4:49.14 (12)	2:10.23 (gold)	8:18.31 (12)
11	Herma Meijer	Netherlands	186.555	43.51 (5)	4:48.95 (9)	2:15.10 (13)	8:18.54 (13)
12	Erwina Ryś-Ferens	Poland	187.787	44.63 (16)	4:49.03 (10)	2:14.23 (9)	8:22.43 (14)
13	Elena Belci	Italy	187.961	45.51 (20)	4:45.26 (8)	2:16.70 (18)	8:13.42 (9)
14	Yelena Tumanova	Soviet Union	188.016	45.76 (24)	4:49.20 (14)	2:14.26 (10)	8:13.03 (8)
15	Irina Bogatova	Soviet Union	189.127	44.25 (11)	4:52.05 (16)	2:15.86 (15)	8:29.16 (16)
16	Petra Moolhuizen	Netherlands	189.951	45.76 (24)	4:49.76 (15)	2:16.11 (17)	8:25.28 (15)
NC17	Emese Nemeth-Hunyady	Austria	137.788	44.14 (9)	4:52.47 (17)	2:14.71 (12)	–
NC18	Zofia Tokarczyk	Poland	138.204	43.69 (7)	4:56.45 (21)	2:15.32 (14)	–
NC19	Ariane Loignon	Canada	138.526	43.31 (2)	4:57.12 (23)	2:17.09 (19)	–
NC20	Chantal Côté	Canada	139.651	44.57 (15)	4:55.29 (19)	2:17.60 (20)	–
NC21	Michelle Kline	United States	140.256	44.29 (12)	4:57.04 (22)	2:19.38 (22)	–
NC22	Tama Sundstrom	United States	141.633	44.80 (19)	4:59.10 (24)	2:20.95 (23)	–
NC23	Shelley Rhead	Canada	142.196	43.86 (8)	5:12.02 (27)	2:19.00 (21)	–
NC24	Minna Nystedt	Norway	143.752	46.01 (26)	4:59.20 (25)	2:23.63 (24)	–
NC25	Stéphanie Dumont	France	144.061	45.61 (23)	5:02.25 (26)	2:24.23 (25)	–
NC26	Elke Felicetti	Italy	150.061	48.20 (28)	5:19.19 (28)	2:25.99 (26)	–
NC27	Jasmin Krohn	Sweden	151.224	45.53 (22)	4:55.39 (20)	2:49.39 (28)	–
NC28	Anje Kremer	New Zealand	168.299	55.74 (29)	5:48.40 (29)	2:43.48 (27)	–
NC	Angela Zuckerman	United States	96.300	47.46 (27)	4:53.04 (18)	DNS	–

DNS = Did not start

== Attribution ==
In Dutch
