= 1990 World Allround Speed Skating Championships for women =

International speed skating competition

1990 World Allround Speed Skating Championships for Women
- Venue: Olympic Oval, Calgary, Canada
- Dates: 10–11 February
- Competitors: 26 from 13 nations

Medalist women
1st place, gold medalist(s)		Jacqueline Börner	DDR
2nd place, silver medalist(s)		Seiko Hashimoto	JPN
3rd place, bronze medalist(s)		Constanze Moser-Scandolo	DDR

The 51st edition of the World Allround Speed Skating Championships for Women took place on 10 and 11 February 1990 in Calgary at the Olympic Oval ice rink.

Title holder was Constanze Moser-Scandolo from East Germany.

This was the first time that the world championships for women had been held in an indoor stadium.

== Distance medalists ==
Event	Gold (gold)	Silver (silver)	Bronze (bronze)
500m	Seiko Hashimoto	Herma Meijer	Zofia Tokarczyk
3000m	Jacqueline Börner	Gunda Kleemann	Heike Schalling
1500m	Wang Xiuli	Seiko Hashimoto	Constanze Moser-Scandolo
5000m	Heike Schalling	Elena Belci	Constanze Moser-Scandolo

== Classification ==
Rank	Skater	Country	Points Samalog	500m	3000m	1500m	5000m
1st place, gold medalist(s)	Jacqueline Börner	East Germany	171.634	41.66 (8)	4:19.86 (gold)	2:04.54 (4)	7:31.51 (4)
2nd place, silver medalist(s)	Seiko Hashimoto	Japan	172.037	40.22 (gold)	4:28.66 (10)	2:03.80 (2)	7:37.75 (10)
3rd place, bronze medalist(s)	Constanze Moser-Scandolo	East Germany	172.509	41.62 (7)	4:27.59 (8)	2:03.91 (3)	7:29.88 (3)
4	Herma Meijer	Netherlands	173.451	41.09 (2)	4:27.62 (9)	2:05.98 (6)	7:37.65 (9)
5	Heike Schalling	East Germany	173.804	43.05 (21)	4:21.61 (3)	2:06.95 (10)	7:28.37 (gold)
6	Lyudmila Prokasheva	Soviet Union	173.915	41.84 (10)	4:27.53 (7)	2:06.46 (8)	7:33.34 (8)
7	Elena Belci	Italy	174.253	42.88 (19)	4:23.39 (4)	2:07.80 (13)	7:28.75 (2)
8	Lia van Schie	Netherlands	174.335	42.74 (16)	4:25.84 (5)	2:06.27 (7)	7:31.99 (5)
9	Wang Xiuli	China	174.977	41.25 (4)	4:32.21 (18)	2:03.34 (gold)	7:52.46 (15)
10	Emese Nemeth-Hunyady	Austria	175.534	41.85 (11)	4:29.68 (12)	2:05.90 (5)	7:47.72 (13)
11	Natsue Seki	Japan	176.332	42.46 (13)	4:30.54 (14)	2:07.89 (14)	7:41.52 (11)
12	Hanneke de Vries	Netherlands	177.104	44.32 (23)	4:26.07 (6)	2:09.56 (21)	7:32.53 (7)
13	Yelena Lapuga	Soviet Union	177.250	42.75 (17)	4:31.62 (16)	2:07.59 (11)	7:47.00 (12)
14	Svetlana Boyko	Soviet Union	177.762	44.39 (24)	4:30.27 (13)	2:09.34 (20)	7:32.14 (6)
15	Moira d'Andrea	United States	190.208	55.58 * (25)	4:30.63 (15)	2:07.93 (15)	7:48.80 (14)
16	Sandra Voetelink	Netherlands	196.868	1:01.62 * (26)	4:29.23 (11)	2:07.66 (12)	7:58.24 (16)
NC17	Irina Abdullina	Soviet Union	188.016	45.76 (24)	4:49.20 (14)	2:14.26 (10)	8:13.03 (8)
NC18	Caroline Maheux	Canada	130.006	41.45 (5)	4:31.84 (17)	2:09.75 (22)	–
NC19	Zofia Tokarczyk	Poland	130.416	41.12 (3)	4:38.02 (24)	2:08.88 (17)	–
NC20	Michelle Kline	United States	130.585	41.74 (9)	4:35.43 (22)	2:08.82 (16)	–
NC21	Ariane Loignon	Canada	131.354	42.48 (14)	4:33.47 (21)	2:09.89 (23)	–
NC22	Heidi Skjeggestad	Norway	131.678	43.07 (22)	4:33.15 (19)	2:09.25 (19)	–
NC23	Anja Mischke	West Germany	132.754	42.99 (20)	4:35.77 (23)	2:11.41 (25)	–
NC24	Chantal Côté	Canada	132.923	42.56 (15)	4:40.14 (25)	2:11.02 (24)	–
NC	Gunda Kleemann	East Germany	84.808	41.45 (5)	4:20.15 (2)	DQ	–
NC	Jasmin Krohn	Sweden	85.750	42.75 (17)	DQ	2:08.96 (18)	–

DQ = Disqualified
* Fell

== Attribution ==
In Dutch
