= 1995 Women's World Allround Speed Skating Championships =

International speed skating competition

Women's World Allround Speed Skating Championships
- Venue: Savalen kunstisbane, Savalen. Norway
- Dates: 3–4 March
- Competitors: 26 from 14 nations

Medalist women
1st place, gold medalist(s)		Gunda Niemann	GER
2nd place, silver medalist(s)		Lyudmila Prokasheva	KAZ
3rd place, bronze medalist(s)		Annamarie Thomas	NED

The 56th edition of the Women's World Allround Speed Skating Championships was held on 3 and 4 March 1995 at the Savalen kunstisbane in Savalen, Norway.

26 speed skaters from 14 countries participated. It was the final edition held separately for women. From 1996 onward the men's and women's World Allround Speed Skating Championships would be combined into a single tournament.

Gunda Niemann won the world title ahead of Lyudmila Prokasheva and Annamarie Thomas. It was her fourth world title after 1991, 1992 and 1993.

== Distance medals ==
Distance	Gold (gold)	Silver (silver)	Bronze (bronze)
500m	Gunda Niemann	Emese Hunyady	Moira d'Andrea
3000m	Gunda Niemann	Carla Zijlstra	Lyudmila Prokasheva
1500m	Gunda Niemann	Lyudmila Prokasheva	Annamarie Thomas
5000m	Gunda Niemann	Carla Zijlstra	Heike Warnicke-Schalling

== Standings ==
Place	Name	Points	500m	3000m	1500m	5000m
1st place, gold medalist(s)	Gunda Niemann (GER)	171.276	41.00 (1)	4:24.72 (1)	2:03.86 (1)	7:28.70 (1)
2nd place, silver medalist(s)	Lyudmila Prokasheva (KAZ)	175.201	42.68 (9)	4:26.13 (3)	2:06.15 (2)	7:41.16 (4)
3rd place, bronze medalist(s)	Annamarie Thomas (NED)	175.548	42.25 (5)	4:28.44 (6)	2:06.62 (3)	7:43.52 (5)
4	Emese Hunyady (AUT)	175.842	41.27 (2)	4:30.13 (7)	2:08.00 (5)	7:48.85 (8)
5	Heike Warnicke-Schalling (GER)	177.138	43.40 (17)	4:27.68 (4)	2:09.55 (8)	7:39.42 (3)
6	Mie Uehara (JPN)	177.309	42:73 (11)	4:30.83 (8)	2:09.25 (7)	7:43.58 (6)
7	Claudia Pechstein (GER)	178.120	42.91 (14)	4:31.28 (9)	2:09.97 (9)	7:46.74 (7)
8	Carla Zijlstra (NED)	178.682	44.82 (23)	4:25.06 (2)	2:11.80 (16)	7:37.53 (2)
9	Maki Tabata (JPN)	179.085	42.85(12)	4:35.15 (14)	2:09.20 (6)	7:53.11 (9)
10	Tonny de Jong (NED)	179.445	43.02 (15)	4:32.46 (11)	2:10.77 (12)	7:54.25 (10)
11	Anette Tønsberg (NOR)	180.052	42.68 (9)	4:32.63 (13)	2:12.09 (18)	7:59.04 (11)
12	Moira D'Andrea (USA)	180.074	41.70 (3)	4:37.02 (16)	2:10.14 (10)	8:08.24 (12)
NQ13	Mihaela Dascălu (ROM)	132.149	42.40 (6)	4:35.80 (15)	2:11.35 (16)	-
NQ14	Becky Sundström (USA)	132.264	41.97 (4)	4:39.23 (20)	2:11.27 (14)	-
NQ15	Noriko Munekata (JPN)	132.461	43.37 (16)	4:32.47 (12)	2:11.04 (13)	-
NQ16	Emese Antal (AUT)	132.49	42.44 (7)	4:39.16 (19)	2:10.75 (11)	8:13.77 (10)
NQ17	Cerasela Hordobețiu (ROM)	133.284	42.63 (8)	4:39.01 (18)	2:12.46 (19)	-
NQ18	Elena Belci-Dal Farra (ITA)	134.846	44.28 (22)	4:32.04 (10)	2:15.68 (23)	-
NQ19	Svetlana Vysokova (RUS)	134.904	43.79 (18)	4:38.39 (17)	2:14.15 (21)	-
NQ20	Chris Scheels (USA)	135.506	44.22 (21)	4:42.42 (21)	2:12.65 (20)	-
NQ21	Christina Schön (SWE)	135.671	44.02 (19)	4:45.99 (22)	2:11.96 (17)	-
NQ22	Ingrid Liepa (CAN)	136.199	42.90 (13)	4:51.40 (24)	2:14.20 (22)	-
NQ23	Svetlana Konstantinova (UKR)	138.453	44.12 (20)	4:51.32 (23)	2:17.34 (24)	-
NQ24	Isabelle Doucet (CAN)	140.058	45.23 (24)	4:51.59 (25)	2:18.69 (25)	-
NQ25	Ilonda Lūse (LAT)	142:626	46.27 (25)	4:55.18 (26)	2:21.48 (26)	-
-	Svetlana Bazhanova (RUS)	87:333	dnf	4:28.04 (5)	2:07:98 (4)	-

== See also ==
- 1995 Men's World Allround Speed Skating Championships
