= Speed skating at the 1994 Winter Olympics – Women's 3000 metres =

Women's 3000 metres at the XVII Olympic Winter Games
- Pictogram for speed skating
- Venue: Hamar Olympic Hall
- Dates: February 17, 1994
- Competitors: 27 from 14 nations
- Winning time: 4:17.43

Medalists
1st place, gold medalist(s)		Svetlana Bazhanova; Russia
2nd place, silver medalist(s)		Emese Hunyady; Austria
3rd place, bronze medalist(s)		Claudia Pechstein; Germany

The women's 3000 metres in speed skating at the 1994 Winter Olympics took place on 17 February, at the Hamar Olympic Hall. 27 competitors from 14 nations participated in competition.

== Records ==
Prior to this competition, the existing world and Olympic records were as follows:

World record	Gunda Niemann-Kleemann (GER)	4:10.80	Calgary, Canada	9 December 1990
Olympic record	Yvonne van Gennip (NED)	4:11.94	Calgary, Canada	23 February 1988

== Results ==
Rank	Pair	Lane	Name	Country	Time	Behind
1st place, gold medalist(s)	7	I	Svetlana Bazhanova	Russia	4:17.43	-
2nd place, silver medalist(s)	4	I	Emese Hunyady	Austria	4:18.14	+0.71
3rd place, bronze medalist(s)	1	I	Claudia Pechstein	Germany	4:18.34	+0.91
4	6	I	Lyudmila Prokasheva	Kazakhstan	4:19.33	+1.90
5	9	I	Annamarie Thomas	Netherlands	4:19.82	+2.39
6	14	O	Seiko Hashimoto	Japan	4:21.07	+3.64
7	5	I	Hiromi Yamamoto	Japan	4:22.37	+4.94
8	2	I	Mihaela Dascălu	Romania	4:22.42	+4.99
9	1	O	Carla Zijlstra	Netherlands	4:23.42	+5.99
10	4	O	Miki Ogasawara	Japan	4:25.27	+7.84
11	7	O	Tonny de Jong	Netherlands	4:25.88	+8.45
12	8	O	Tatyana Trapeznikova	Russia	4:27.82	+10.39
13	9	O	Emese Dörfler-Antal	Austria	4:27.91	+10.48
14	5	O	Ingrid Liepa	Canada	4:28.28	+10.85
15	2	O	Heike Warnicke	Germany	4:28.43	+11.00
16	8	I	Ewa Wasilewska	Poland	4:28.86	+11.43
17	10	O	Cerasela Hordobețiu	Romania	4:29.31	+11.88
18	13	I	Elisabetta Pizio	Italy	4:32.34	+14.91
19	13	O	Angela Zuckerman	United States	4:33.08	+15.65
20	11	I	Jasmin Krohn	Sweden	4:33.34	+15.91
21	11	O	Chris Scheels	United States	4:34.14	+16.71
22	10	I	Chantal Bailey	United States	4:34.64	+17.21
23	12	O	Baeg Eun-bi	South Korea	4:34.86	+17.43
24	14	I	Kenzhesh Sarsekenova-Orynbayeva	Kazakhstan	4:45.56	+28.13
25	12	I	Ilonda Lūse	Latvia	4:47.75	+30.32
-	3	O	Gunda Niemann-Kleemann	Germany	DQ	
-	6	I	Elena Belci	Italy	DQ	
