= Biathlon at the 1992 Winter Olympics – Women's relay =

Women's biathlon relay at the XVI Olympic Winter Games
- Venue: Les Saisies
- Dates: 14 February 1992
- Competitors: 48 from 16 nations
- Winning time: 1:15:55.6

Medalists
1st place, gold medalist(s)		France; Corinne Niogret; Véronique Claudel; Anne Briand
2nd place, silver medalist(s)		Germany; Uschi Disl; Antje Misersky; Petra Schaaf
3rd place, bronze medalist(s)		Unified Team; Yelena Belova; Anfisa Reztsova; Yelena Melnikova

The Women's 3 × 7.5 kilometre biathlon relay competition at the 1992 Winter Olympics 14 February, at Les Saisies. Each national team consisted of three members, with each skiing 7.5 kilometres and shooting twice, once prone and once standing.

At each shooting station, a competitor has eight shots to hit five targets; however, only five bullets are loaded in a magazine at one - if additional shots are required, the spare bullets must be loaded one at a time. If after the eight shots are taken, there are still targets not yet hit, the competitor must ski a 150-metre penalty loop.

== Summary ==
This was the Olympic debut of the Women's Biathlon Relay. The race had been held at eight World Championships, all won by the Soviet Union. The Unified Team, carrying the tradition of the Soviets, plus two medalists from the Sprint race three days prior, were the favorites.

After the first shooting stage, the Unified Team held a 30 second lead over a surprising Chinese team, which shot perfectly. Bulgaria and France were the only other teams within one minute. Germany, forced to ski a penalty loop, was in sixth. Shortly after leaving the shooting range, Yelena Belova took a wrong turn which cost the Unified Team roughly 20 seconds. Despite the error, Belova entered the second shooting stage with a 25 second gap, but gave it all back after skiing a penalty loop. Bulgaria and France left the shooting range tied for first, with Norway twenty seconds behind in third. The Unified Team was in fourth, 34 seconds behind the leaders.

In the second leg, France, Germany, and Bulgaria all shot perfectly from the prone position. While the Unified Team skied another penalty loop. France had a 14 second lead over Germany coming out of the range. The second shooting produced similar results, France and Germany needed only one combined extra round, while the Unified Team narrowly avoided a penalty loop. France exited the range with an eight second lead over Germany, and a 30 second lead over the Unified Team. Bulgaria was now over one minute behind. The final lap saw Anfisa Reztsova display the skiing speed that won her an Olympic cross-country skiing medal four years earlier. In just 2.5km, she made up over a minute on France, and nearly 30 seconds on Germany. Despite two penalty laps, and eight total extra rounds, the Unified Team had a seven second lead as the final exchange was made.

The final leg saw Anne Briand of France recoup nearly all of the 30 second deficit prior to the first shooting stage. The three leaders only needed one combined extra round, and all left the range within 9 seconds of each other. The podium was all but decided. Nerves were apparent in the final shooting stage, but no one took advantage. All three teams needed two extra rounds to clear the targets. France left the range with an 8 second advantage over Germany. The favored Unified Team, 27 seconds behind, would have to settle for bronze. Briand, continuing to ski the fastest leg of the entire event, increased the lead all the way to the finish.

This was the first ever Olympic biathlon medal for France.

== Results ==
Rank	Bib	Team	Penalties (P+S)	Time	Deficit
1st place, gold medalist(s)	3	France; Corinne Niogret; Véronique Claudel; Anne Briand	0+3; 0+1 0+0; 0+0 0+0; 0+0 0+2	1:15:55.6; 25:54.7; 25:30.7; 24:30.2	–
2nd place, silver medalist(s)	2	Germany; Uschi Disl; Antje Misersky; Petra Schaaf	1+8; 1+3 0+1; 0+0 0+1; 0+1 0+2	1:16:18.4; 26:33.7; 24:28.9; 25:15.8	+22.8
3rd place, bronze medalist(s)	8	Unified Team; Yelena Belova; Anfisa Reztsova; Yelena Melnikova	2+10; 0+0 1+3; 1+3 0+2; 0+0 0+2	1:16:54.6; 26:21.9; 24:33.5; 25:59.2	+59.0
4	7	Bulgaria; Silvana Blagoeva; Nadezhda Aleksieva; Iva Shkodreva	0+9; 0+2 0+0; 0+0 0+3; 0+1 0+3	1:18:54.8; 25:58.9; 26:33.1; 26:22.8	+2:59.2
5	4	Finland; Mari Lampinen; Tuija Sikiö; Terhi Markkanen	0+? 0+1 0+2; 0+1 0+0; 0+0 0+?	1:20:17.8; 26:40.9; 26:29.1; 27:07.8	+4:22.2
6	14	Sweden; Christina Eklund; Inger Björkbom; Mia Stadig	0+? 0+? 0+? 0+? 0+? 0+0 0+?	1:20:56.6; 27:49.7; 26:30.9; 26:36.0	+5:01.0
7	1	Norway; Signe Trosten; Hildegunn Fossen; Elin Kristiansen	1+? 0+3 0+0; 1+3 0+2; 0+2 0+?	1:21:20.0; 26:48.0; 27:48.3; 26:43.7	+5:24.4
8	5	Czechoslovakia; Gabriela Suvová; Jana Kulhavá; Jiřina Adamičková	3+? 1+3 2+3; 0+? 0+? 0+? 0+?	1:23:12.7; 29:58.6; 27:07.1; 26:07.0	+7:17.1
9	15	Estonia; Jelena Poljakova; Eveli Peterson; Krista Lepik	1+? 0+? 0+? 0+? 1+3; 0+? 0+?	1:23:16.2; 27:29.6; 28:38.2; 27:08.4	+7:20.6
10	9	Romania; Adina Șotropa; Mihaela Cârstoi; Ileana Ianoşiu-Hangan	0+? 0+? 0+? 0+? 0+? 0+? 0+?	1:23:39.6; 28:31.6; 27:24.4; 27:43.6	+7:44.0
11	13	Canada; Lise Meloche; Myriam Bédard; Jane Isakson	2+? 0+? 2+3; 0+? 0+? 0+? 0+?	1:23:49.1; 29:59.7; 25:19.9; 28:29.5	+7:53.5
12	16	China; Wang Jinping; Liu Guilan; Song Aiqin	4+? 0+0 4+3; 0+? 0+? 0+? 0+?	1:23:51.0; 29:22.1; 27:25.7; 27:03.2	+7:55.4
13	11	Italy; Erica Carrara; Monika Schwingshackl; Nathalie Santer	2+? 0+? 1+3; 1+3 0+? 0+? 0+?	1:23:00.8; 29:11.4; 28:57.5; 25:51.9	+8:05.2
14	10	Poland; Agata Suszka; Zofia Kiełpińska; Halina Pitoń	4+? 1+3 0+? 0+? 3+3; 0+? 0+?	1:24:07.5; 28:32.0; 29:12.1; 26:23.4	+8:11.9
15	6	United States; Nancy Bell; Joan Smith; Mary Ostergren	2+? 0+? 1+3; 0+? 0+? 0+? 1+3	1:24:36.9; 29:15.7; 27:47.7; 27:33.5	+8:41.3
16	12	Hungary; Brigitta Bereczki; Kathalin Czifra; Beatrix Holéczy	3+? 0+? 3+3; 0+? 0+? 0+? 0+?	1:31:31.1; 30:30.7; 29:37.2; 31:23.2	+15:35.5
