= Ski jumping at the 1992 Winter Olympics – Large hill team =

Men's large hill team at the XVI Olympic Winter Games
- Pictogram for ski jumping
- Venue: Tremplin du Praz
- Dates: February 14, 1992
- Competitors: 54 from 14 nations
- Winning score: 644.4

Medalists
1st place, gold medalist(s)		Finland; Ari-Pekka Nikkola, Mika Laitinen, Risto Laakkonen, Toni Nieminen
2nd place, silver medalist(s)		Austria; Heinz Kuttin, Ernst Vettori, Martin Höllwarth, Andreas Felder
3rd place, bronze medalist(s)		Czechoslovakia; Tomáš Goder, František Jež, Jaroslav Sakala, Jiří Parma

The men's large hill team ski jumping competition for the 1992 Winter Olympics was held at Tremplin du Praz. The competition took place on 14 February.

== Results ==
Rank	Bib	Team	Jump 1	Jump 2	Total
1st place, gold medalist(s)	13	Finland; Ari-Pekka Nikkola; Mika Laitinen; Risto Laakkonen; Toni Nieminen	330.2; 109.1; ~~97.0~~; 100.9; 120.2	314.2; 94.4; ~~87.4~~; 100.0; 119.8	644.4; 203.5; 184.4; 200.9; 240.0
2nd place, silver medalist(s)	14	Austria; Heinz Kuttin; Ernst Vettori; Martin Höllwarth; Andreas Felder	331.2; 105.8; ~~102.4~~; 117.9; 107.5	311.7; 101.5; 98.2; 112.0; ~~97.8~~	642.9; 207.3; 200.6; 229.9; 205.3
3rd place, bronze medalist(s)	10	Czechoslovakia; Tomáš Goder; František Jež; Jaroslav Sakala; Jiří Parma	325.6; 110.3; 103.4; ~~103.2~~; 111.9	294.5; 96.5; 88.3; ~~83.8~~; 109.7	620.1; 206.8; 191.7; 187.0; 221.6
4	5	Japan; Jiro Kamiharako; Masahiko Harada; Noriaki Kasai; Kenji Suda	291.5; ~~90.3~~; 108.0; 90.4; 93.1	279.5; 93.2; 95.8; ~~75.0~~; 90.5	571.0; 173.5; 203.8; 165.4; 183.6
5	12	Germany; Heiko Hunger; Dieter Thoma; Christof Duffner; Jens Weissflog	276.1; 88.2; 94.1; ~~79.1~~; 93.8	268.6; 92.2; 86.8; ~~64.0~~; 89.6	544.7; 180.4; 180.9; 143.1; 183.4
6	1	Slovenia; Primož Kopač; Matjaž Zupan; Franci Petek; Samo Gostiša	268.5; 75.2; ~~70.3~~; 96.8; 96.5	274.8; ~~72.8~~; 92.7; 87.2; 94.9	543.3; 148.0; 163.0; 184.0; 191.4
7	11	Norway; Rune Olijnyk; Magne Johansen; Lasse Ottesen; Espen Bredesen	286.6; 88.5; 90.2; ~~84.1~~; 107.9	251.4; 78.5; 80.9; ~~66.0~~; 92.0	538.0; 167.0; 171.1; 150.1; 199.9
8	9	Switzerland; Markus Gähler; Martin Trunz; Sylvain Freiholz; Stefan Zünd	274.9; 93.1; ~~78.0~~; 88.8; 93.0	263.0; 87.2; ~~75.2~~; 83.5; 92.3	537.9; 180.3; 153.2; 172.3; 185.3
9	8	Sweden; Magnus Westman; Jan Boklöv; Staffan Tällberg; Mikael Martinsson	277.0; 91.8; 90.3; ~~76.0~~; 94.9	238.1; 84.9; 64.9; ~~62.2~~; 88.3	515.1; 176.7; 155.2; 138.2; 183.2
10	2	France; Steve Delaup; Nicolas Jean-Prost; Didier Mollard; Jérôme Gay	262.1; 86.9; ~~81.3~~; 87.6; 87.6	248.8; ~~77.6~~; 82.4; 82.1; 84.3	510.9; 164.5; 163.7; 169.7; 171.9
11	6	Unified Team; Yury Dudarev; Dionis Vodnyev; Mikhail Yesin; Andrey Verveykin	266.6; ~~55.6~~; 87.7; 96.8; 82.1	236.8; ~~51.2~~; 68.6; 94.7; 73.5	503.4; 106.8; 156.3; 191.5; 155.6
12	3	United States; Bob Holme; Ted Langlois; Bryan Sanders; Jim Holland	247.2; ~~76.6~~; 82.8; 77.5; 86.9	225.2; 72.6; 80.7; ~~68.7~~; 71.9	472.4; 149.2; 163.5; 146.2; 158.8
13	7	Italy; Ivo Pertile; Roberto Cecon; Ivan Lunardi	242.3; 78.0; 88.1; 76.2	209.9; 68.7; 68.9; 72.3	452.2; 146.7; 157.0; 148.5
14	4	Canada; Kirk Allen; Ron Richards; Horst Bulau	174.3; 48.0; 64.8; 61.5	162.7; 39.6; 66.9; 56.2	337.0; 87.6; 131.7; 117.7
