= Nancy Johnstone =

Nancy Johnstone may refer to:

- Nancy Bell-Johnstone (born 1959), American biathlete
- Nancy Johnstone (writer) (1906–1951), English writer and humanitarian, wife of Archie Johnstone
