= Ragni =

Ragni is an Italian surname that translates to "spiders" in English. Notable people with the name include:

- Elio Ragni (1910–1998), Italian athlete
- Gerome Ragni (1935–1991), American actor, singer and songwriter
- Ottavio Ragni (1852–1919), Italian general
- Riccardo Ragni (born 1991), Italian football goalkeeper

== Given name ==
- Ragni (actress), actress in Indian and later Pakistani cinema
- Ragni Piene (born 1947), Norwegian mathematician
- Else Ragni Yttredal (born 1968), Norwegian speed skater
