= Kopac =

Kopač, Kopáč or Kopăç may refer to:

== People ==
- František Kopač, Czech football club manager
- Jiří Kopáč (born 1982), Czech rower
- Mojca Kopač (born 1975), Slovenian figure skater
- Primož Kopač (born 1970), Slovenian ski jumper
- Slavko Kopač (1913–1995), Croatian-French artist and poet

== Other ==
- Kopáč passive sensor
- Kopačevo (Hungarian: Kopăç), settlement in Croatia
