= List of New Zealand records in speed skating =

The following are the national records in speed skating in New Zealand maintained by the Ice Speed Skating New Zealand Inc. (ISSNZ).

== Men ==
Event	Record	Athlete	Date	Meet	Place	Ref
500 meters	36.79	Mark Jackson	8 March 2013	Olympic Oval Final	Calgary, Canada	
500 meters × 2						
1000 meters	1:10.36	Reyon Kay	19 March 2016	Olympic Oval Final	Calgary, Canada	
1500 meters	1:44.96	Peter Michael	9 December 2017	World Cup	Salt Lake City, United States	
3000 meters	3:40.74	Peter Michael	25 February 2017	International Race	Inzell, Germany	
5000 meters	6:09.68	Peter Michael	10 December 2017	World Cup	Salt Lake City, United States	
10000 meters	12:58.07	Peter Michael	21 November 2015	World Cup	Salt Lake City, United States	
Team pursuit (8 laps)	3:36.79	Reyon Kay; Shane Dobbin; Peter Michael	8 December 2017	World Cup	Salt Lake City, United States	
Sprint combination	148.960 pts	Wayne Begg	21–22 March 2009	Olympic Oval Final	Calgary, Canada	
Small combination	163.111 pts	Daniel Joseph Nation	20–21 February 2009	World Junior Championships	Zakopane, Poland	
Big combination	150.003 pts	Shane Dobbin	12–13 February 2011	World Allround Championships	Calgary, Canada	

== Women ==
Event	Record	Athlete	Date	Meet	Place	Ref
500 meters	45.35	Jessica van Bentum	28 February 2016	International Race	Inzell, Germany	
500 meters × 2						
1000 meters	1:29.11	Jessica van Bentum	13 February 2016	Frillensee Cup	Inzell, Germany	
1500 meters	2:16.29	Jessica van Bentum	28 February 2016	International Race	Inzell, Germany	
3000 meters	4:50.75	Jessica van Bentum	27 February 2016	International Race	Inzell, Germany	
5000 meters	9:06.86	Anje Kremer	10 March 1984		Inzell, West Germany	
10000 meters	19:19.19	Anje Kremer	16 March 1980		Tynset, Norway	
Team pursuit (6 laps)						
Sprint combination						
Mini combination	207.176 pts	Anje Kremer	4–5 March 1982		Inzell, West Germany	
Small combination	214.414 pts	Anje Kremer	10–11 March 1984		Inzell, West Germany	
