= Asker SK (speed skating) =

Norwegian speed skating club

Asker Skøyteklubb is a Norwegian speed skating club from Asker.

The club was founded on 2 March 1964. Its home track was Føyka until 1992, when Risengabanen was opened.

Well-known speed skaters include Svein-Erik Stiansen, Alf Rekstad, Else Ragni Yttredal, Hege Langli, Unni Marsteinstredet, Tine Køpke, Henrik Christiansen and Ida Njåtun.
