= Annamarie Thomas =

Dutch speed skater

Personal information
- Born: 15 September 1971 (age 54) Emmeloord, Netherlands

Sport
- Country: Netherlands
- Sport: Speed skating
- Turned pro: 1990
- Retired: 2006
Medal record
Women's speed skating
Representing the Netherlands
World Championships
Gold medal – first place	1996 Hamar	1000 m
Gold medal – first place	1996 Hamar	1500 m
Bronze medal – third place	1995 Savalen	Allround
European Championships
Silver medal – second place	1995 Heerenveen	Allround
Silver medal – second place	1996 Heerenveen	Allround
Bronze medal – third place	1999 Heerenveen	Allround

Annamarie Thomas (born 15 September 1971) is a former Dutch speed skater.

== Biography ==
Thomas was an allround speed skater, but favored the shorter distances. The years 1995 and 1996 found her at her peak: in both those years she was the Dutch all-round champion as well as Dutch sprint champion and came in second at the European Allround Championships behind Gunda Niemann. She was third in the 1995 World Allround Championships in Savalen and in 1996 won both the 1000 and 1500 m in the inaugural World Single Distance Championships in Hamar.

On 20 March 1999 in the Olympic Oval in Calgary, she broke the world record in 1500 m. by 1.5 seconds, skating in 1.55.50. That weekend she also broke the world record for the combined times for the 500, 1000, 1500 and 3000 m in one tournament (the "mini combination") and reached 4th place in the adelskalender.

In the summer of 2006 she was a participant in the first season of the celebreality show Sterren Dansen Op Het IJs, the Dutch version of Skating with Celebrities, where she ended up in fourth place.

She retired from competitive skating in November 2006.

== Records ==
=== Personal records ===
Personal records
Speed skating
Event	Result	Date	Location	Notes
500 m	38.97	26 January 2002	Utah Olympic Oval, Salt Lake City	
1000 m	1:15.20	17 February 2002	Utah Olympic Oval, Salt Lake City	
1500 m	1:55.50	20 March 1999	Olympic Oval, Calgary	World record until beaten by Anni Friesinger on 4 March 2001
3000 m	4:11.45	6 February 1999	Vikingskipet, Hamar	
5000 m	7:16.97	7 February 1999	Vikingskipet, Hamar	

=== World records ===
Distance	Time	Date	Location	Note
Small combination	163.901	23 March 1996	Olympic Oval, Calgary	
1500 m	1:55.50	20 March 1999	Olympic Oval, Calgary	
Small combination	158.183	21 March 1999	Olympic Oval, Calgary	

=== Medals ===
Championship	Gold medal	Silver medal	Bronze medal
Dutch Single Distance Championships	4	5	6
Dutch Sprint Championships	2	3	1
Dutch Allround Championships	3	1	2
European Allround Championships	0	2	1
World Single Distance Championships	2	0	0
World Allround Championships	0	0	1

Awards
Preceded by (Netherlands) Rintje Ritsma	Ard Schenk Award; 1995	Succeeded by (Netherlands) Rintje Ritsma
