= Pete Vordenberg =

American cross-country skier (born 1971)

Personal information
- Nationality: American
- Born: November 2, 1971 (age 54) Rota, Spain
- Education: Northern Michigan University
- Height: 173 cm (5 ft 8 in)
- Weight: 70 kg (154 lb; 11 st 0 lb)

Sport
- Sport: Cross-country skiing

Pete Vordenberg (born November 2, 1971) is an American cross-country skier. He competed at the 1992 Winter Olympics and the 1994 Winter Olympics.
