= Primož Kopač =

Slovenian ski jumper

Personal information
- Full name: Primož Kopač
- Born: November 25, 1970 (age 55) Žiri, Slovenia

Sport
- Country: (Slovenia) Slovenian
- Sport: Ski jumping

World Cup career
- Seasons: 1989–1994

Achievements and titles
- Olympic finals: 1992 Winter Olympics

Primož Kopač (born 25 November 1970 in Žiri) is a Slovenian former ski jumper who competed from 1989 to 1994. At the 1992 Winter Olympics in Albertville, he finished sixth in the team large hill and 26th in the individual normal hill events.

Kopač's best World Cup career finish was 25th in a large hill event in Canada in 1989.
