= Duncan Douglas =

American biathlete (born 1965)

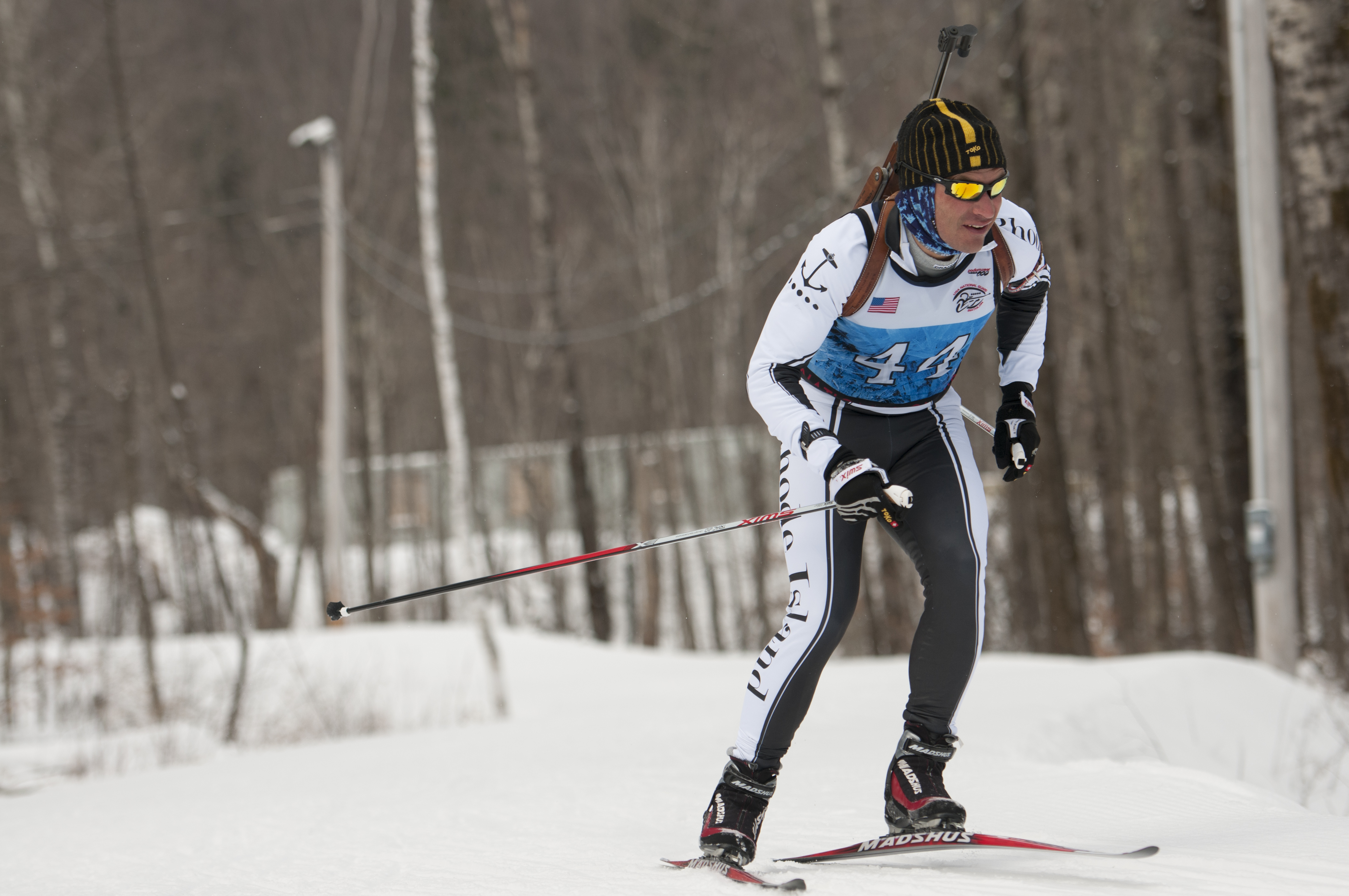
- Duncan Douglas in 2014

Personal information
- Born: November 22, 1965 (age 60) New York, New York, United States

Sport
- Sport: Biathlon

Duncan Douglas (born 22 November 1965) is an American biathlete. He competed at the 1992 Winter Olympics and the 1994 Winter Olympics.
