= Yelena Melnikova =

Russian biathlete

Olympic medal record

Women's biathlon

Representing the Unified Team
Bronze medal – third place	1992 Albertville	4x7.5 km relay

Yelena Vladimirovna Melnikova-Tchepikova (Russian: Елена Владимиовна Мелъникова-Чепикова); born 17 June 1971) is a Russian former biathlete who competed in the 1992 Winter Olympics.
