= Tara Laszlo =

American speed skater

- Tara Laszlo speedskating

Personal information
- Full name: Tara Elizabeth Laszlo
- Nationality: American
- Born: October 30, 1971 (age 55)

Sport
- Country: United States
- Sport: Speed skating

Tara Elizabeth Laszlo (born 30 October 1971) is a former American female speed skater who was also a primary sprint skater. She represented United States at the 1992 Winter Olympics and competed in the women's 1500 metres and in the women's 5000 metres events.
