= Chris Scheels =

American speed skater (born 1977)

Personal information
- Born: February 7, 1977 (age 49) West Allis, Wisconsin, United States

Sport
- Sport: Speed skating

Chris Scheels (born February 7, 1977) is an American speed skater. She competed in the women's 3000 metres at the 1994 Winter Olympics.
