= Brian Wanek =

American speed skater

Personal information
- Born: May 25, 1967 (age 59) Milwaukee, Wisconsin, United States

Sport
- Sport: Speed skating

Brian Wanek (born May 25, 1967) is an American speed skater. He competed at the 1992 Winter Olympics and the 1994 Winter Olympics.
