= Bob Holme =

American ski jumper

Bob Holme (born June 6, 1969) is an American former ski jumper who competed in the 1992 Winter Olympics and in the 1994 Winter Olympics. Bob is currently the Director of Mountain Maintenance for Winter Park Resort in Colorado where he has worked since 2003. Bob is responsible for the leadership, management, and strategic direction for mountain maintenance operations at Winter Park Resort. He currently oversees operations and maintenance of heavy equipment, motor vehicles, grooming and trails, the resort's 7 terrain parks, Trestle BikePark, snowmaking, and lift maintenance.
