= Anje Kremer =

New Zealand speed skater

Anje Kremer (also known as Ans Kremer, born 12 February 1943) is a Dutch-born New Zealander who is a former competitive speed skater.

Born in the Netherlands, Kremer emigrated to New Zealand in February 1970. She started speed skating in 1971.

In 1973, Kremer was part of New Zealand's first speed skating team to compete in an international competition. Kremer and the team competed against Australia in the inaugural Tasman Trophy completion at Lake Ida on the South Island of New Zealand. From 1980 to 1989 Kremer participated in international competitions in Europe, USA and Canada.
