= Mary Ostergren =

American biathlete (born 1960)

Personal information
- Full name: Mary Ann Ostergren
- Nationality: American
- Born: November 25, 1960 (age 64)

Sport
- Sport: Biathlon

Mary Ann Ostergren (born November 25, 1960) is an American biathlete. She competed at the 1992 Winter Olympics, held in Albertville, France, and the 1994 Winter Olympics, held in Lillehammer, Norway.

== Biography ==
Mary Ann Ostergren had spent eight years on the US Biathlon Team. And, alongside her appearance in the 1992 Winter Olympics and the 1994 Winter Olympics, she competed at the 1991 and 1993 World Championships. In 1990 Ostergren gotten first place, and won the US biathlon title at 7Â½ km. She also competed in flatwater marathon canoeing and in marathon cross-country skiing.

Ostergren graduated from Carleton College in 1984.
