= Ted Langlois =

American ski jumper

John Thaddeus "Tad" Langlois (born January 25, 1968, in Paterson, New Jersey) is an American former ski jumper who competed in the 1988 Winter Olympics, in the 1992 Winter Olympics, and in the 1994 Winter Olympics.
