= Joan Smith (biathlete) =

American biathlete (born 1967)

Personal information
- Born: June 25, 1967 (age 57); Honeoye Falls, New York, United States

Sport
- Sport: Biathlon

Joan Smith (born June 25, 1967) is an American biathlete. She competed at the 1992 Winter Olympics and the 1994 Winter Olympics.
