= Bryan Sanders =

American ski jumper

Personal information
- Born: October 24, 1970 (age 55) Stillwater, Minnesota, U.S.

Sport
- Sport: Ski jumping

Bryan Sanders (born October 24, 1970) is an American former ski jumper who competed in the 1992 Winter Olympics.
