= Zhang Qing (speed skater) =

Chinese speed skater

Personal information
- Nationality: Chinese
- Born: 31 January 1966 (age 59); Heilongjiang, China

Sport
- Sport: Speed skating

Zhang Qing (Chinese: 张青, born 31 January 1966) is a Chinese speed skater. She competed at the 1988 Winter Olympics and the 1992 Winter Olympics.
