= Nancy Bell-Johnstone =

American biathlete (born 1959)

Personal information
- Full name: Nancy Rebecca Bell-Johnstone
- Nationality: American
- Born: October 22, 1959 (age 67) New York, New York, United States

Sport
- Sport: Biathlon

Nancy Rebecca Bell-Johnstone (born October 22, 1959) is an American biathlete. She competed in three events at the 1992 Winter Olympics. Born in New York City, Bell-Johnstone grew up skiing in Stowe, Vermont, where she was part of the Mount Mansfield Club, and her parents were local business owners.
