= Liu Junhong =

Chinese speed skater

Personal information
- Nationality: Chinese
- Born: 29 May 1969 (age 55)

Sport
- Sport: Speed skating

Liu Junhong (born 29 May 1969) is a Chinese speed skater. She competed in two events at the 1992 Winter Olympics.
