= Jacqueline Börner =

German speed skater

Personal information
- Born: 30 March 1965 (age 61) Wismar, Bezirk Rostock, East Germany

Sport
- Country: Germany
- Sport: Speed skating
Medal record
Representing Germany
World Championships
| Gold medal – first place | 1992 Albertville | 1500 m |

Jacqueline Börner (later Schubert; born 30 March 1965) is a former speed skater.

Jacqueline Börner won her first international medal when she earned bronze at the 1987 European Allround Championships. Two years later, she won bronze again. A top skater in her own right, Börner often finished behind compatriots such as Gunda Kleemann and Andrea Mitscherlich.

In 1990, Börner initially had a very good year when she won silver at the European Allround Championships behind Kleemann and then became World Allround Champion the following month, having had some luck that Kleemann was disqualified after her 1500 m race. One month later, Börner won that season's World Cup on the 1500 m, having performed the best over 8 World Cup races on that distance during that season. In August of that year, though, she got hit by an automobile while training on her bicycle, resulting in torn anterior cruciate ligaments.

Having recovered from her injuries, Börner returned to competition at the World Cup meeting in November 1991 and promptly won bronze on the 1500 m. After having finished 6th in the 1992 European Allround Championships, Börner participated in the 1992 Winter Olympics in Albertville and surprisingly beat Gunda Kleemann (who had since gotten married and was known as Gunda Niemann then) on the 1500 m by 0.05 seconds to become Olympic Champion.

Börner retired from speed skating at the end of 1996, although she participated in one more tournament (one for skaters of 35 years or older) in 2000.

== Medals ==
An overview of medals won by Börner at important championships she participated in, listing the years in which she won each:

| Championships | Gold medal | Silver medal | Bronze medal |
|---|---|---|---|
| Winter Olympics | 1992 (1500 m) | | |
| World Allround | 1990 | | |
| European Allround | | 1990 | 1987; 1989 |
| German Allround | | | 1994 |
| German Single Distance | | 1985 (1000 m); 1987 (1500 m); 1992 (1500 m); 1992 (3000 m) | 1986 (1000 m); 1989 (1500 m); 1990 (1500 m) |

== Personal records ==
| Distance | Result | Date | Location |
|---|---|---|---|
| 500 m | 40.90 | 2 March 1996 | Calgary |
| 1000 m | 1:20.55 | 20 March 1987 | Medeo |
| 1500 m | 2:04.54 | 11 February 1990 | Calgary |
| 3000 m | 4:19.86 | 10 February 1990 | Calgary |
| 5000 m | 7:31.51 | 11 February 1990 | Calgary |
| Small combination | 171.634 | 11 February 1990 | Calgary |
| Mini combination | 173.266 | 20 November 1988 | Berlin |
| Sprint combination | 163.820 | 21 March 1987 | Medeo |

Börner has an Adelskalender score of 170.874 points. Her highest ranking on the Adelskalender was a 5th place.
