= Heike Warnicke =

German speed skater

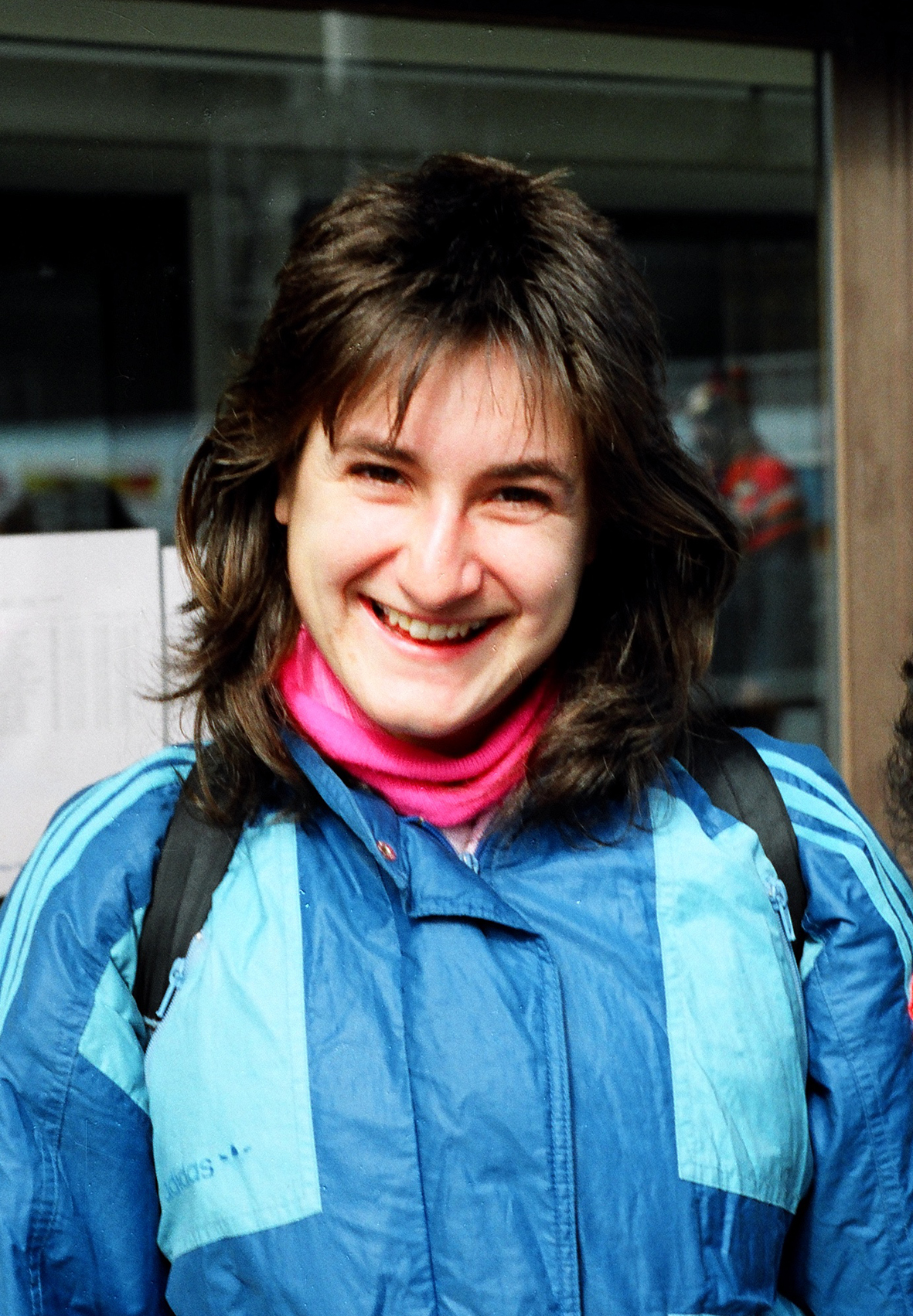

Personal information
- Nationality: German
- Born: Heike Schalling; 1 June 1966 (age 60) Weimar, East Germany
- Height: 1.73 m (5 ft 8 in)
- Weight: 63 kg (139 lb)

Sport
- Country: East Germany; Germany
- Sport: Speed skating
- Club: ESC Erfurt
- Turned pro: 1981
- Retired: 1998
Medal record
Women's speed skating
Representing Germany
Olympic Games
Silver medal – second place	1992 Albertville	3000 m
Silver medal – second place	1992 Albertville	5000 m

Heike Warnicke (German pronunciation: [ˈhaɪkə ˈvaʁnɪkə]; née Schalling, later Sinaki, born 1 June 1966) is a German former speed skater who competed in the 1992 and 1994 Winter Olympics.

She was born in Weimar.

In 1992, Warnicke won the silver medal in the 3,000 metres event as well as in the 5,000 metres competition, both times behind Gunda Niemann. In the 1500 metres contest, she finished eighth.

Two years later, at the Winter Olympics in Lillehammer, Warnicke finished 14th in the 5000 metres event, 15th in the 3000 metres competition, and 26th in the 1500 metres contest.
