= Svetlana Boyko (speed skater) =

Soviet speed skater (born 1966)

Personal information
- Nationality: Soviet
- Born: 7 April 1966 (age 59)

Sport
- Sport: Speed skating

Svetlana Yuryevna Shurova-Boyko (Russian: Светлана Юрьевна Шурова-Бойко); born 7 April 1966) was a Soviet speed skater. She competed at the 1988 Winter Olympics and the 1992 Winter Olympics.
