= Elke Felicetti =

Italian speed skater

Personal information
- Nationality: Italian
- Born: 11 August 1970 (age 54); Bolzano, Italy

Sport
- Sport: Speed skating

Elke Felicetti (born 11 August 1970) is an Italian speed skater. She competed in two events at the 1992 Winter Olympics.
