= Svetlana Bazhanova =

Soviet speed skater (born 1972)

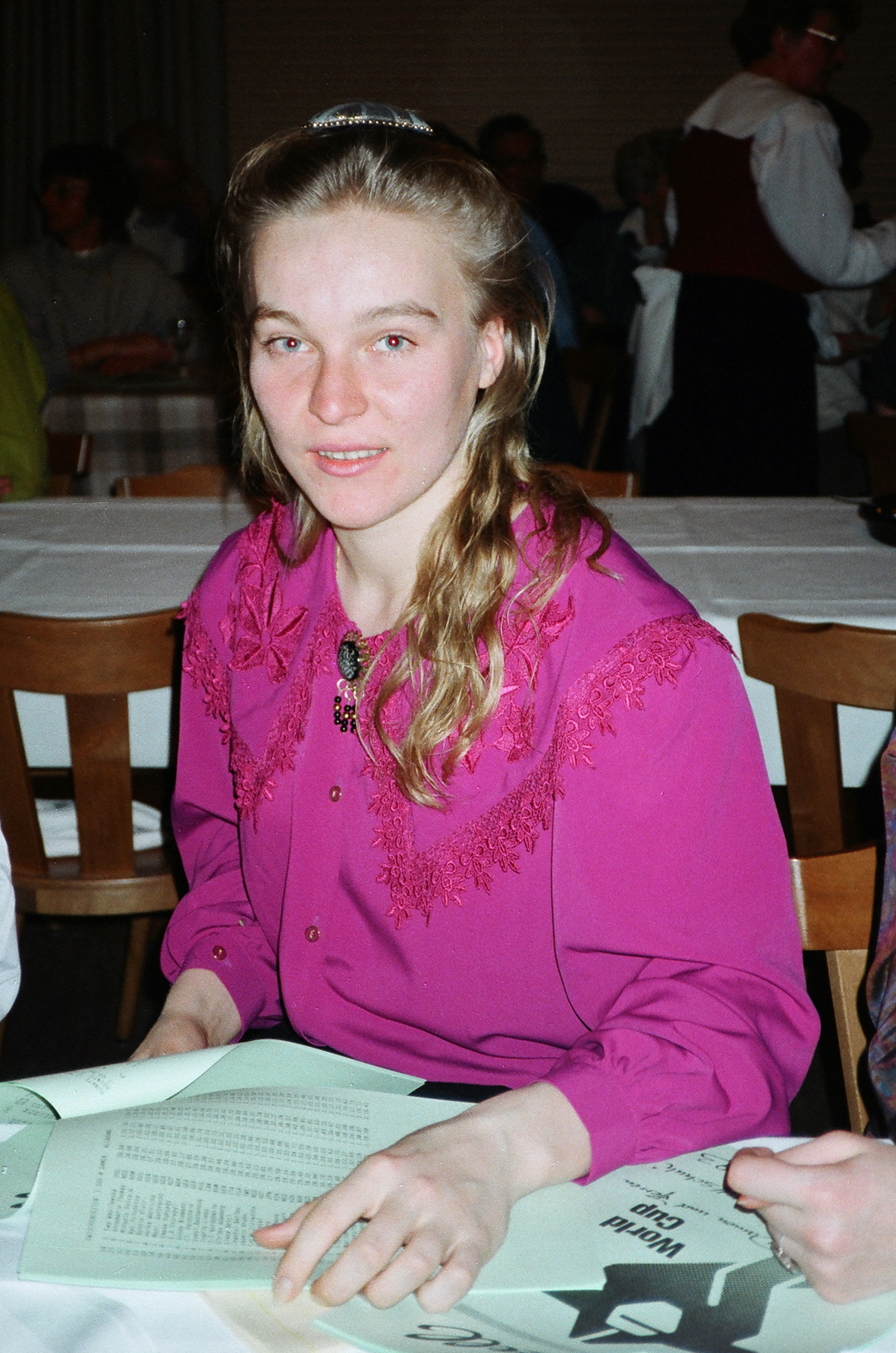

Personal information
- Full name: Svetlana Valeryevna Bazhanova
- Nationality: Russian
- Born: 1 December 1972 (age 53) Chelyabinsk, Russian SFSR, Soviet Union
- Height: 1.75 m (5 ft 9 in)
- Weight: 70 kg (154 lb)
- Spouse: Vadim Sayutin

Sport
- Country: Russia
- Sport: Speed skating
- Club: SC Chelyabinsk
Medal record
Representing Russia
Women's speed skating
Olympic Games
Gold medal – first place	1994 Lillehammer	3000 m
European Championships
Silver medal – second place	1994 Hamar	Allround
Bronze medal – third place	1993 Heerenveen	Allround
Bronze medal – third place	1998 Helsinki	Allround

Svetlana Valeryevna Bazhanova (Russian: Светлана Валерьевна Бажанова) (born 1 December 1972) is a former speed skater.

Svetlana Bazhanova married Vadim Sayutin, a fellow speed skater in 1994.

== Personal records ==
To put these personal records in perspective, the WR column lists the official world records on the dates that Bazhanova skated her personal records.

Event	Result	Date	Venue	WR
500 m	40.77	2 February 1998	Nagano	37.55
1,000 m	1:20.19	9 November 1997	Inzell	1:17.65
1,500 m	1:59.46	5 March 2000	Nagano	1:55.50
3,000 m	4:12.02	3 March 2000	Nagano	4:00.51
5,000 m	7:13.12	4 March 2000	Nagano	6:56.84

Bazhanova has an Adelskalender score of 165.905 points.
