= Angela Zuckerman =

American speed skater

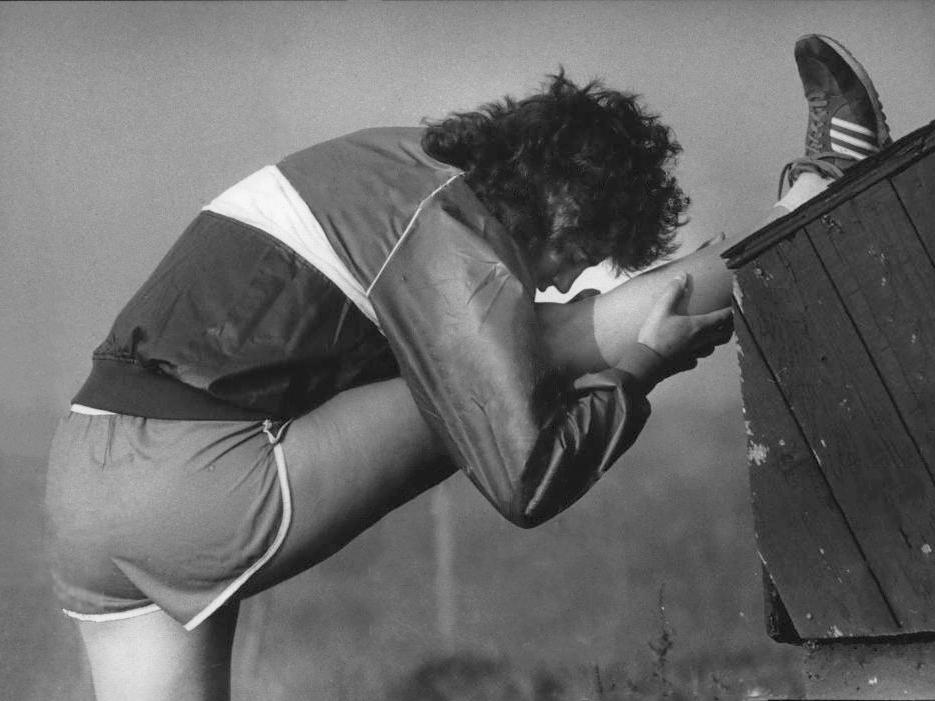
- Zuckerman in 1987

Personal information
- Born: March 24, 1965 (age 61) St. Louis, Missouri, U.S.

Sport
- Sport: Speed skating

Achievements and titles
- Personal best(s): 500 m – 43.29 (1990); 1000 m – 1:26.20 (1992); 1500 m – 2:08.43 (1994); 3000 m – 4:29.22 (1989); 5000 m – 8:07.55 (1993)

Angela Zuckerman (born March 24, 1965) is an American former speed skater. She competed at the 1992 and 1994 Winter Olympics with the best result of 19th place over 3000 m in 1994.

Zuckerman debuted internationally at the 1982 World Junior Championship, where she placed seventh all-around, and third at the 1,500 meters. In 1987 she met the French speed skater Jérôme Davre, at a World Cup; their long-distance relationships ended up in marriage after the 1992 Olympics. Zuckerman graduated with a major in zoology from the University of Calgary. Her sister Laura was also a competitive speed skater.
