= Lia van Schie =

Dutch speed skater

Personal information
- Born: 8 July 1970 (age 55) Leiden, the Netherlands
- Height: 1.73 m (5 ft 8 in)
- Weight: 61 kg (134 lb)

Sport
- Sport: Speed skating
- Club: Nijmeegse Schaats Vereniging
Medal record
Dutch Allround championships
Gold medal – first place	1992 Alkmaar	Allround

Lia van Schie (born 8 July 1970) is a retired speed skater from the Netherlands who was active between 1989 and 1995. She competed at the 1992 Winter Olympics in the 1500, 3000 and 5000 m and finished in 16th, 9th and 8th place, respectively. She won a bronze medal at the World All-Round Speed Skating Championships for Women in 1991.

== Results ==
Year	NC Distance	NC Allround	EC Allround	WC Allround	Olympics
1989	10th 1000 m 11th 1500 m				
1990	15th 500 m 4th 1500 m 3000 m 5000 m			8th	
1991	18th 500 m 1500 m 3000 m 5000 m	4th			
1992	1500 m 3000 m 5000 m		5th	8th	16th 1500 m 9th 3000 m 8th 5000 m
1993	11th 1500 m 4th 3000 m 4th 5000 m	4th			
1994	6th 1500 m 5th 3000 m 7th 5000 m	4th			
1995	5th 1500 m 3000 m 7th 5000 m	4th			

Personal bests:

- 500 m – 42.51 (1991)
- 1000 m – 1:23.4 (1991)
- 1500 m – 2:06.27 (1990)
- 3000 m – 4:24.11 (1992)
- 5000 m – 7:29.35 (1992)
