= Ewa Borkowska-Wasilewska =

Polish speed skater

Ewa Wasilewska
Personal information
- Full name: Ewa Justyna Wasilewska
- Nationality: Polish
- Born: January 7, 1967 (age 59) Giżycko, Poland

Sport
- Country: Poland
- Sport: Speed skating

Ewa Wasilewska also known as Ewa Borkowska, Ewa Justyna Borkowska or Ewa Borkowska-Wasilewska is a former Polish female speed skater. She competed at the 1992 Winter Olympics and in the 1994 Winter Olympics representing Poland.
