= Mary Docter =

American speed skater

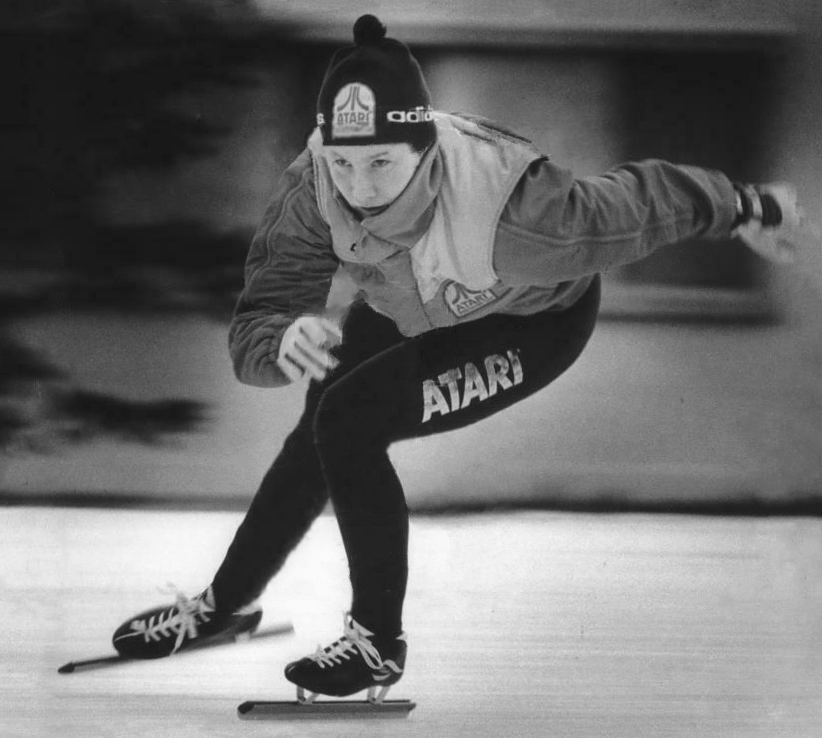
- Mary Docter in 1983

Personal information
- Born: February 11, 1961 (age 65) Madison, Wisconsin, U.S.
- Height: 167 cm (5 ft 6 in)
- Weight: 63 kg (139 lb)

Sport
- Sport: Speed skating
- Club: Madison Speed Skating Club

Achievements and titles
- Personal bests: 500 m – 42.79 (1989); 1000 m – 1:23.10 (1989); 1500 m – 2:06.56 (1989); 3000 m – 4:25.96 (1989); 5000 m – 7:37.00 (1988)

Mary Angela Docter (born February 11, 1961) is an American speed skater from Madison, Wisconsin. She competed in four Olympic Games (in 1980, 1984, 1988 and 1992), placing sixth in the 3,000 meter in 1980 and 1984.

After the 1988 Olympic Games, she admitted that she got stoned three nights during the week prior to competition. She finished 19th in the 3,000 meters and 11th in the 5,000 meters event.

According to the New York Times, after Docter qualified for the 1992 team in three speed-skating events — 1,500, 3,000 and 5,000 meters — she told the media about her drug addiction over the past 10 years, revealing its destructive nature and how she finally confronted the problem by seeking help.

Docter competed in tennis and athletics in high school, and later attended the University of Wisconsin. She is the sister of fellow Olympic athlete Sarah Docter.
