= Michelle Kline =

American speed skater

Personal information
- Full name: Michelle Lynn Kline
- Nationality: American
- Born: November 8, 1968 (age 57) Golden Valley, Minnesota, United States

Sport
- Country: United States
- Sport: Speed skating

Michelle Lynn Kline (born 8 November 1968) is a former American female speed skater. She competed at the 1992 Winter Olympics and 1994 Winter Olympics representing United States.

Just prior to the 1992 Winter Olympics (which was also her first Olympic event), she met with an accident in 1991 causing severe major injuries to her ribs and lungs along with other members when they were engaged in a trip from Chicago to Milwaukee. However, she recovered from the major injuries and was able to participate at the 1992 Winter Olympics.
