= Else Ragni Yttredal =

Norwegian speed skater (born 1968)

Personal information
- Nationality: Norwegian
- Born: 8 August 1968 (age 57) Asker

Sport
- Sport: Speed skating
- Club: Asker SK

Else Ragni Yttredal (born 8 August 1968) is a Norwegian speed skater. She was born in Asker and represented the club Asker SK. She competed at the 1992 Winter Olympics in Albertville.

She was Norwegian all-round champion in 1991, 1992 and 1993.
