= Mie Uehara =

Japanese speed skater (born 1971)

Personal information
- Nationality: Japanese
- Born: 1 July 1971 (age 54) Suwa, Nagano, Japan

Sport
- Sport: Speed skating

Mie Uehara (上原 三枝, Uehara Mie; born 1 July 1971) is a Japanese speed skater. She competed at the 1992 Winter Olympics and the 1998 Winter Olympics.
