= Emese Hunyady =

Hungarian-Austrian speed skater (born 1966)

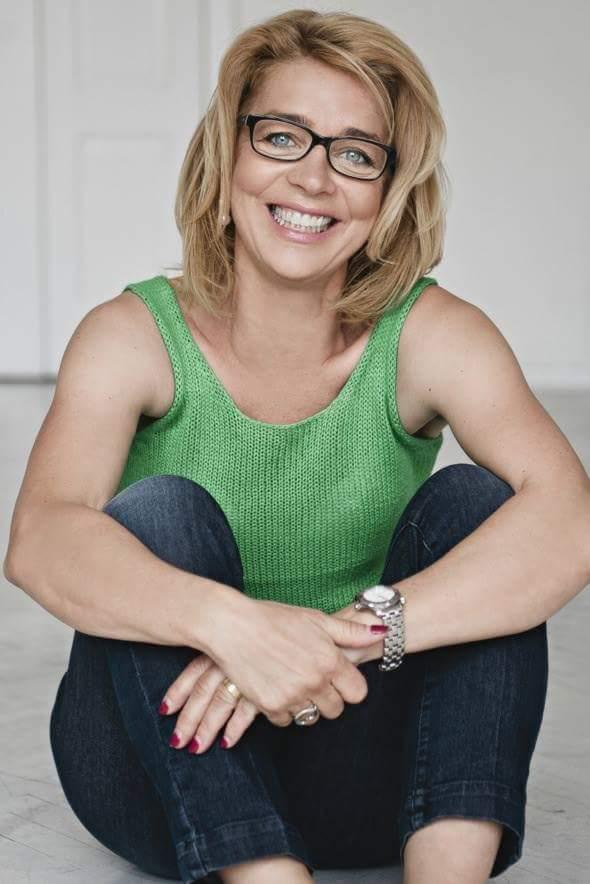
- Hunyady in 2021

Personal information
- Born: 4 March 1966 (age 60) Budapest, Hungary
- Height: 1.67 m (5 ft 6 in)
- Weight: 65 kg (143 lb)
- Spouse: Tamás Németh

Sport
- Country: Hungary; Austria
- Sport: Speed skating
- Turned pro: 1981
- Retired: 2002
Medal record
Representing Austria
Women's speed skating
Olympic Games
Gold medal – first place	1994 Lillehammer	1500 m
Silver medal – second place	1994 Lillehammer	3000 m
Bronze medal – third place	1992 Albertville	3000 m

Emese Hunyady (born 4 March 1966) is a former Hungarian-Austrian speed skater.

At age ten, Hunyady participated at the 1977 Hungarian Sprint Championships for Juniors, finishing sixth. Representing Hungary, she had her first international competition in 1979, and in the following years, although still a junior, she entered several senior tournaments. In 1985, after marrying her Austrian coach Tamás Németh, she obtained Austrian citizenship, and started competing for Austria. The marriage was dissolved some years later, but she retained her Austrian citizenship.

During her 25-year-long career, she was a steady performer, almost always finishing in the top 10 of the events she participated in. Her best year was 1994, when she won bronze at the European Allround Championships, became World Allround Champion, won the 1500 m World Cup, and became Olympic Champion in the 1500 m, while winning Olympic silver in the 3000 m. After that, her successes became fewer, but in 1999, she surprisingly won the World Single Distance Championships in her favourite distance, the 1500 m.

Hunyady participated in six Winter Olympics from 1984 to 2002, and won many Hungarian and Austrian National Allround, Sprint, and Single Distance Championships. She started her sporting career in figure skating, something she used to show when celebrating her victories as a speed skater.

Hunyady is married to Timo Järvinen, a former speed skater from Finland. They have a son, Jasper.

== Medals ==
An overview of medals won by Hunyady at important championships she participated in, listing the years in which she won each:

Championships	Gold medal	Silver medal	Bronze medal
Winter Olympics	1994 (1500 m)	1994 (3000 m)	1992 (3000 m)
World Allround	1994	1992; 1993	–
World Sprint	–	–	–
World Single Distance	1999 (1500 m)	–	1996 (1000 m); 2000 (1500 m)
World Cup	1994 (1500 m)	1991 (1500 m); 1992 (1500 m); 1992 (3000 m / 5000 m); 1993 (1500 m); 1995 (1500 m)	1990 (1500 m); 1993 (3000 m / 5000 m); 1998 (1500 m)
European Allround	1993	1992	1994
Austrian Allround	1995; 1996; 1997; 1999; 2000	–	–
Austrian Sprint	2001	–	–
Hungarian Allround	1984	1985	–
Hungarian Sprint	1980; 1981; 1982; 1983; 1984; 1985	–	–

== World records ==
Over the course of her career, Hunyady skated one world record:

Event	Result	Date	Venue
Mini combination	164.658	27 March 1994	Calgary

== Personal records ==
To put these personal records in perspective, the last column (WR) lists the official world records on the dates that Hunyady skated her personal records.

Event	Result	Date	Venue	WR
500 m	38.87	15 March 2001	Calgary	37.40
1000 m	1:15.99	30 January 2000	Calgary	1:14.61
1500 m	1:56.51	20 February 2002	Salt Lake City	1:54.38
3000 m	4:06.55	10 February 2002	Salt Lake City	3:59.26
5000 m	7:15.23	20 February 1998	Nagano	7:03.26
Small combination	164.885	7 February 1999	Hamar	163.020

Hunyady has an Adelskalender score of 162.320 points. Her highest position on the Adelskalender was a third place.

== See also ==
- List of athletes with the most appearances at Olympic Games

Awards
Preceded by (Austria) Anita Wachter	Austrian Sportswoman of the year 1994	Succeeded by (Austria) Ursula Profanter
