= Carla Zijlstra =

Dutch speed skater

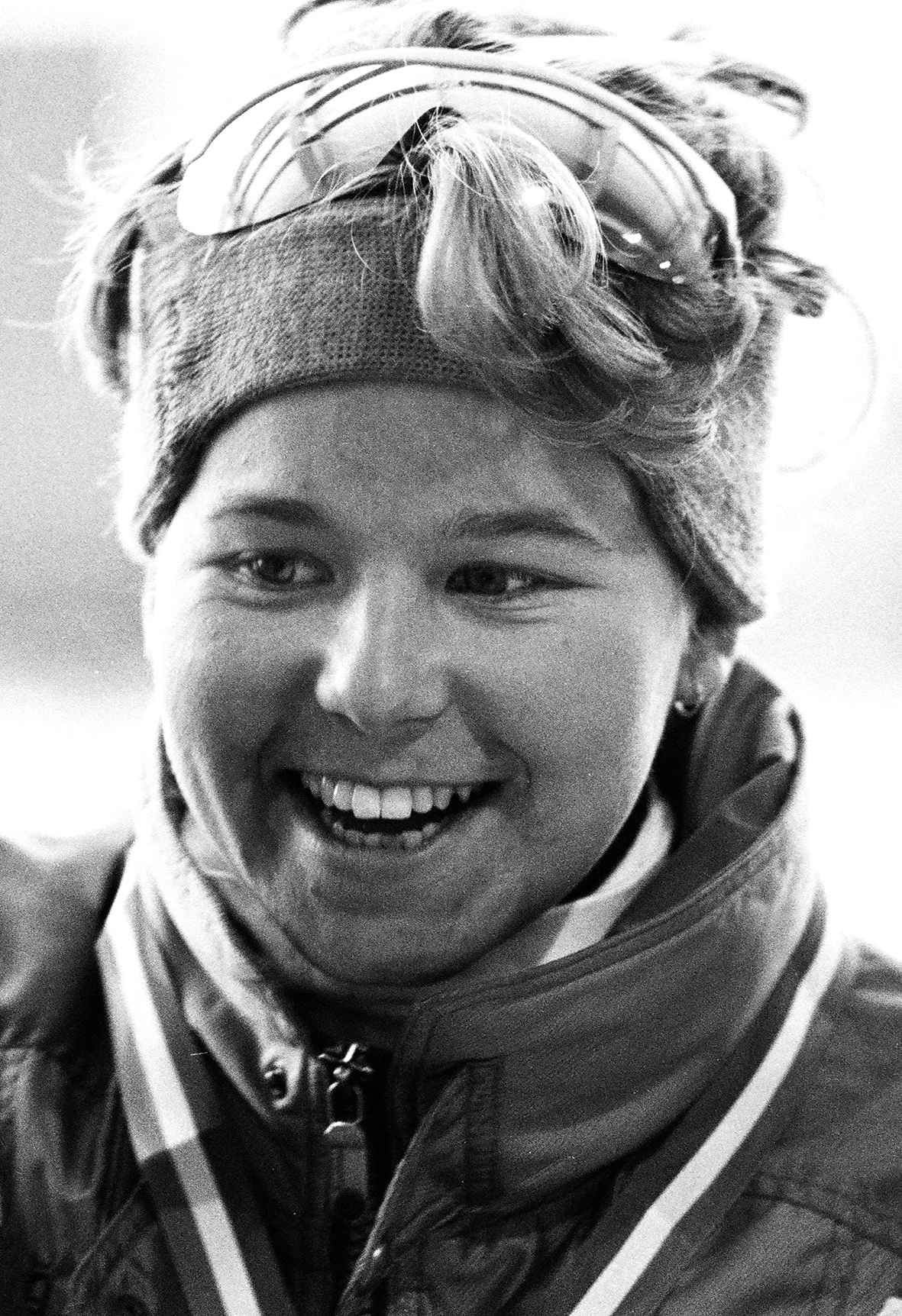

Personal information
- Born: 15 March 1969 (age 57) Sneek, the Netherlands
- Height: 1.63 m (5 ft 4 in)
- Weight: 57 kg (126 lb)

Sport
- Sport: Speed skating
- Club: Groninger Studenten Schaatsvereniging Tjas
Medal record
Dutch Allround championships
Gold medal – first place	1993 Assen	Allround

Carla Johanna Zijlstra (born 15 March 1969) is a retired speed skater from the Netherlands, who was active between 1989 and 1999. She competed at the 1992, 1994 and 1998 Winter Olympics in the 1500, 3000 and 5000 m. Her best achievements were fourth positions in the 3000 and 5000 m in 1992. In 1998, she was the Olympic flag bearer for the Netherlands.

She won two silver (1996, 1997) and one bronze medal (1998) in the 5000 m at the world championships; she also had a bronze medal in the 3000 m in 1997.

In 2001, she married Anthony Evans, an Olympic cross-country skier from Australia, and moved to Canberra. She has two daughters and works part-time as a physiotherapist and pilates instructor.

== Results ==
Year	NC Distance	NC Allround	EC Allround	WC Allround	WC Distance	Olympics
1989	12th 3000 m	9th				
1990	17th 500 m 11th 1500 m 8th 3000 m 4th 5000 m	6th				
1991			10th	9th		
1992	16th 500 m 5th 1500 m 3000 m 3000 m 5000 m	3000 m	8th	10th		9th 1500 m 4th 3000 m 4th 5000 m
1993	ns2 500 m 3000 m 1500 m 3000 m 5000 m		7th	7th		
1994	1500 m 3000 m 5000 m		6th			22nd 1500 m 9th 3000 m 7th 5000 m
1995	11th 1500 m 3000 m 5000 m		12th	8th		
1996			11th		7th 3000 m 5000 m	
1997		3000 m	7th		3000 m 5000 m	
1998	3000 m 3000 m 5000 m	4th			6th 3000 m 5000 m	9th 3000 m 6th 5000 m
1999	9th 1500 m 3000 m 3000 m 5000 m	8th			5th 3000 m 4th 5000 m	

Personal bests:

- 500 m – 41.74 (1999)
- 1000 m – 1:22.09 (1999)
- 1500 m – 2:01.67 (1999)
- 3000 m – 4:10.63 (1998)
- 5000 m – 7:05.94 (1999)
