= Mihaela Dascălu =

Romanian speed skater

Personal information
- Born: 12 February 1970 (age 56) Braşov, Romania

Sport
- Country: Romania
- Sport: Speed skating
- Retired: 1998

Achievements and titles
- Personal best(s): 1000 m: (1992 Winter Olympics, 6th) Romanian record

Mihaela Dascălu (born 12 February 1970) is a retired Romanian speed skater, and the most successful speed skater from that country.

== Biography ==
Dascălu was born in the city of Braşov, and first trained as a figure skater before changing to speed skating. She debuted at the 1987 World Junior Championships, where she finished seventh. The following year she finished ninth, but was later disqualified for doping use along with her teammate Cerasela Hordobețiu, making it impossible for her to make the 1988 Winter Olympics at Calgary.

She returned to the international scene in 1991, and finished sixth in the 1000 meter during the 1992 Winter Olympics, the best Romanian Olympic speed skating finish of all time. In the 1994 World Allround Speed Skating Championships in Butte, Montana she won a bronze medal. In the 1994 Winter Olympics she finished eighth in two events, the 1500 meter and the 3000 meter.

She continued to compete through the 1990s, with numerous top ten finishes, such as a seventh-place finish in the Women's European Championships in 1996, and sixth the following year in the same competition. She finished third in 3000 meter at the 6th World Cup 1995-1996 and the World Cup Final 1995-1996, with her also finishing third in the latter in the 1500 meter. She had second-place finishes in the 3000 meter during the 9th World Cup 1995-1996 and the World Cup Final 1996-1997. She also finished second in 1000 meter during the 7th World Cup 1995-1996, as well as second in the 1500 meter during the 7th World Cup 1996-1997. At the 4th World Cup 1996-1997 she finished third in the 5000 meter, followed by a first-place finish the following year in that same event during the 7th World Cup 1996-1997. She retired after the 1998 season, on the heels of her worst finish during the 1998 Winter Olympics, where she finished 34th.
