= Jasmin Krohn =

Swedish speed skater

Personal information
- Nationality: Swedish
- Born: 22 November 1966 Gothenburg, Sweden

Sport
- Country: Sweden
- Sport: speed skating
- Club: IFK Göteborg

Jasmin Annika Krohn, born 22 November 1966 in Gothenburg German Christinae Parish in Gothenburg, Sweden, is a retired female ice speed skater from Sweden, who represented her native country in three consecutive Winter Olympics, starting in 1988 in Calgary, Alberta, Canada. She mainly competed in the long-distance events.
