= Gunda Niemann-Stirnemann =

German speed skater

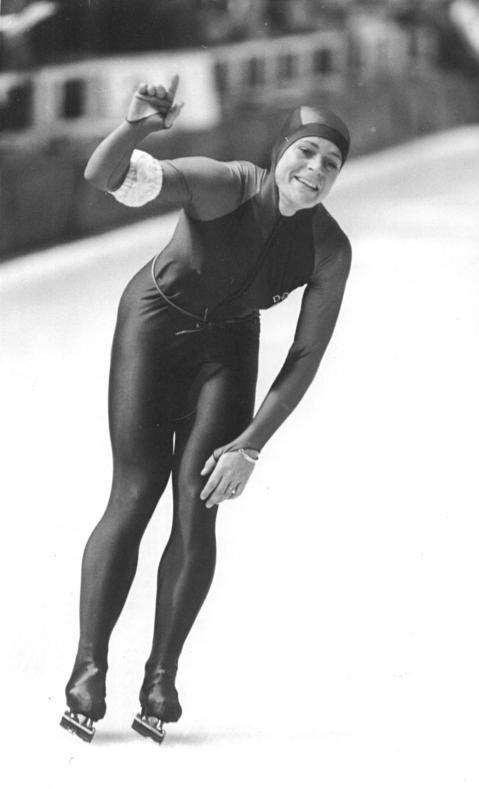

Personal information
- Nationality: German
- Born: Gunda Kleemann; 7 September 1966 (age 59) Sondershausen, Bezirk Erfurt, East Germany
- Height: 1.70 m (5 ft 7 in)
- Weight: 65 kg (143 lb)
- Spouses: Detlev Niemann (1991-1995) (divorced); Oliver Stirnemann (1997-)

Sport
- Country: East Germany; Germany
- Sport: Speed skating
- Club: SC Turbine Erfurt; ESC Erfurt
- Turned pro: 1987
- Coached by: Stephan Gneupel
- Retired: 2005
Medal record
Women's speed skating
Representing Germany
Olympic Games
Gold medal – first place	1992 Albertville	3000 m
Gold medal – first place	1992 Albertville	5000 m
Gold medal – first place	1998 Nagano	3000 m
Silver medal – second place	1992 Albertville	1500 m
Silver medal – second place	1994 Lillehammer	5000 m
Silver medal – second place	1998 Nagano	1500 m
Silver medal – second place	1998 Nagano	5000 m
Bronze medal – third place	1994 Lillehammer	1500 m
World Allround Championships
Gold medal – first place	1991 Hamar	Allround
Gold medal – first place	1992 Heerenveen	Allround
Gold medal – first place	1993 Berlin	Allround
Gold medal – first place	1995 Tynset	Allround
Gold medal – first place	1996 Inzell	Allround
Gold medal – first place	1997 Nagano	Allround
Gold medal – first place	1998 Heerenveen	Allround
Gold medal – first place	1999 Hamar	Allround
Silver medal – second place	1989 Lake Placid	Allround
Silver medal – second place	2000 Milwaukee	Allround

Gunda Niemann-Stirnemann (née Kleemann; born 7 September 1966) is a German former speed skater. She is a three-time Olympic gold medallist, winning the 3000 metres in 1992 and 1998 and the 5000 metres in 1992. She won a total of eight Olympic medals.

== Personal life ==
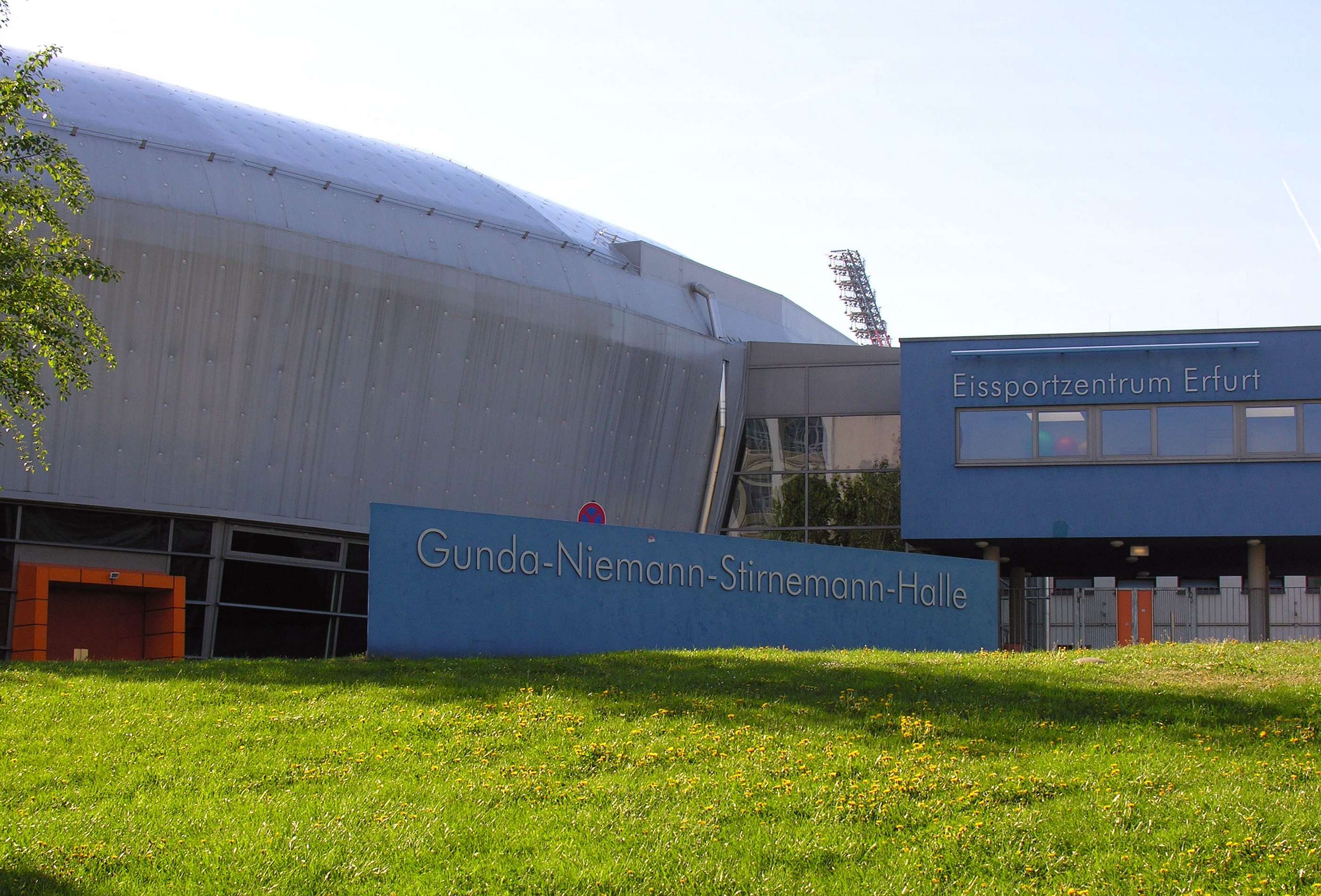
The Gunda-Niemann-Stirnemann-Halle in Erfurt

Born as Gunda Kleemann in Sondershausen, Bezirk Erfurt, East Germany, she has lived in Erfurt for most of her life. Before German reunification in 1990, she skated for East Germany.

She changed her name to Gunda Niemann after her marriage in 1991 to judoka Detlev Niemann. After their divorce in 1995, she kept the name Niemann. She changed her name to Niemann-Stirnemann after marrying her Swiss long-time manager, Oliver Stirnemann, on 11 July 1997. Their daughter Victoria Stirnemann is also a competitive speed skater and a professional boxer.

The speed skating oval in Erfurt, the Gunda-Niemann-Stirnemann-Halle, was named after her.

== Career ==
Niemann-Stirnemann dominated women's speed skating for several years, especially on the longer distances. She has competed in four Olympics, from 1988 to 1998, and won eight Olympic medals (3 gold, 4 silver, and 1 bronze). In the nine years from 1991 to 1999, she won the World Allround Championships every year except 1994. She has a record number of 98 World Cup single distance victories and has won 19 overall World Cup titles. She was European Allround Champion 8 times. Over the course of her career, she set 18 world records. For her performances, she received the Oscar Mathisen Award three times: in 1995, 1996 and 1997.

Niemann-Stirnemann left speed skating in 2001 to give birth to a daughter, but later returned to competition. She planned to make one last comeback and participate in the 2006 Winter Olympics in Turin, but a lingering back injury – which she suffered from since the 2004–05 season – made her quit. At the end of October 2005, a few days before the German Championships, she announced her retirement.

Except for one day in March 1998, Niemann-Stirnemann was number one in the Adelskalender, the all-time allround speed skating ranking, from 24 January 1993, until 2 March 2001 – a total of 2,958 days. She skated in Olympic, World, World Cup, European and national championships to 215 medals, thereof 163 gold medals.

== World records ==
Over the course of her career, Niemann-Stirnemann skated 18 world records:

Distance	Result	Date	Location
3000 m	4:10.80	9 December 1990	Calgary
5000 m	7:13.29	6 December 1993	Hamar
Small combination	167.282	9 January 1994	Hamar
3000 m	4:09.32	25 March 1994	Calgary
5000 m	7:03.26	26 March 1994	Calgary
Small combination	165.708	16 February 1997	Nagano
3000 m	4:07.80	7 December 1997	Heerenveen
3000 m	4:05.08	14 March 1998	Heerenveen
Small combination	163.020	15 March 1998	Heerenveen
3000 m	4:01.67	27 March 1998	Calgary
5000 m	6:58.63	28 March 1998	Calgary
5000 m	6:57.24	7 February 1999	Hamar
Small combination	161.479	7 February 1999	Hamar
5000 m	6:56.84	16 January 2000	Hamar
3000 m	4:00.51	30 January 2000	Calgary
5000 m	6:55.34	25 November 2000	Heerenveen
3000 m	4:00.26	17 February 2001	Hamar
5000 m	6:52.44	10 March 2001	Salt Lake City

Note that the 10000 m was suspended as a world record event at the 1953 ISU Congress.

== Personal records ==
To put these personal records in perspective, the last column (WR) lists the official world records on the dates that Niemann-Stirnemann skated her personal records.

Distance	Result	Date	Location	WR
500 m	40.34	6 February 1999	Hamar	37.55
1000 m	1:20.57	13 November 2000	Berlin	1:14.61
1500 m	1:55.62	4 March 2001	Calgary	1:55.50
3000 m	4:00.26	17 February 2001	Hamar	4:00.51
5000 m	6:52.44	10 March 2001	Salt Lake City	6:55.34
10000 m	14:22.60	27 March 1994	Calgary	none
Small combination	161.479	7 February 1999	Hamar	163.020
Mini combination	169.385	6 February 1994	Baselga di Pinè	166.682
Sprint combination	165.255	17 January 1999	Collalbo	151.690

Niemann-Stirnemann has an Adelskalender score of 160.167 points. Her highest ranking on the Adelskalender was the first place.

== Biography ==
- Gunda Niemann-Stirnemann: Ich Will. Traumkarriere mit Tränen und Triumphen (2000). Das Neue Berlin.

Awards
Preceded by (Norway) Johann Olav Koss	Oscar Mathisen Award; 1995–1997	Succeeded by (Norway) Ådne Søndrål
