= Elena Belci =

Italian speed skater

Personal information
- Nationality: Italian
- Born: 31 May 1964 (age 60); Turin, Italy

Sport
- Sport: Speed skating

Elena Belci (born 31 May 1964) is an Italian speed skater. She competed at the 1988, 1992, 1994 and the 1998 Winter Olympics.
