= List of Asian Games medalists in speed skating =

This is the complete list of Asian Winter Games medalists in speed skating from 1986 to 2025.

== Men ==
=== 100 m ===
Games	Gold	Silver	Bronze
2007 Changchun	Yuya Oikawa (JPN)	Yu Fengtong (CHN)	Lee Kang-seok (KOR)
2025 Harbin	Gao Tingyu (CHN)	Yevgeniy Koshkin (KAZ)	Kim Jun-ho (KOR)

=== 500 m ===
Games	Gold	Silver	Bronze
1986 Sapporo	Akira Kuroiwa (JPN)	Ra Yoon-soo (KOR)	Bae Ki-tae (KOR)
1990 Sapporo	Song Chen (CHN)	Bae Ki-tae (KOR)	Yasushi Kuroiwa (JPN)
1990 Sapporo	Song Chen (CHN)	Bae Ki-tae (KOR)	Yasunori Miyabe (JPN)
1996 Harbin	Takahiro Hamamichi (JPN)	Shared gold	Kim Yoon-man (KOR)
1996 Harbin	Jaegal Sung-yeol (KOR)	Shared gold	Kim Yoon-man (KOR)
1999 Gangwon	Shoji Kato (JPN)	Jaegal Sung-yeol (KOR)	Kazuya Nishioka (JPN)
2003 Aomori	Hiroyasu Shimizu (JPN)	Tomonori Kawata (JPN)	Joji Kato (JPN)
2007 Changchun	Lee Kang-seok (KOR)	Lee Kyou-hyuk (KOR)	Yuya Oikawa (JPN)
2011 Astana–Almaty	Joji Kato (JPN)	Lee Kang-seok (KOR)	Keiichiro Nagashima (JPN)
2017 Sapporo	Gao Tingyu (CHN)	Tsubasa Hasegawa (JPN)	Cha Min-kyu (KOR)
2025 Harbin	Gao Tingyu (CHN)	Wataru Morishige (JPN)	Kim Jun-ho (KOR)

=== 1000 m ===
Games	Gold	Silver	Bronze
1986 Sapporo	Bae Ki-tae (KOR)	Makoto Hirose (JPN)	Akira Kuroiwa (JPN)
1990 Sapporo	Bae Ki-tae (KOR)	Song Chen (CHN)	Hozumi Moriyama (JPN)
1996 Harbin	Yusuke Imai (JPN)	Kim Yoon-man (KOR)	Vadim Shakshakbayev (KAZ)
1999 Gangwon	Choi Jae-bong (KOR)	Lee Kyou-hyuk (KOR)	Chun Joo-hyun (KOR)
2003 Aomori	Lee Kyou-hyuk (KOR)	Hiroyasu Shimizu (JPN)	Takaharu Nakajima (JPN)
2007 Changchun	Lee Kyou-hyuk (KOR)	Mun Jun (KOR)	Takaharu Nakajima (JPN)
2007 Changchun	Lee Kyou-hyuk (KOR)	Mun Jun (KOR)	Choi Jae-bong (KOR)
2017 Sapporo	Takuro Oda (JPN)	Denis Kuzin (KAZ)	Shunsuke Nakamura (JPN)
2025 Harbin	Ning Zhongyan (CHN)	Cha Min-kyu (KOR)	Lian Ziwen (CHN)

=== 1500 m ===
Games	Gold	Silver	Bronze
1986 Sapporo	Yukihiro Mitani (JPN)	Munehisa Kuroiwa (JPN)	Hwang Ik-hwan (KOR)
1990 Sapporo	Bae Ki-tae (KOR)	Toru Aoyanagi (JPN)	Lee In-hoon (KOR)
1996 Harbin	Yusuke Imai (JPN)	Shinya Tanaka (JPN)	Sergey Tsybenko (KAZ)
1999 Gangwon	Choi Jae-bong (KOR)	Chun Joo-hyun (KOR)	Hiromichi Ito (JPN)
2003 Aomori	Lee Kyou-hyuk (KOR)	Mun Jun (KOR)	Yeo Sang-yeop (KOR)
2007 Changchun	Lee Kyou-hyuk (KOR)	Gao Xuefeng (CHN)	Mun Jun (KOR)
2011 Astana–Almaty	Denis Kuzin (KAZ)	Mo Tae-bum (KOR)	Lee Kyou-hyuk (KOR)
2017 Sapporo	Kim Min-seok (KOR)	Takuro Oda (JPN)	Taro Kondo (JPN)
2025 Harbin	Ning Zhongyan (CHN)	Kazuya Yamada (JPN)	Ryota Kojima (JPN)

=== 5000 m ===
Games	Gold	Silver	Bronze
1986 Sapporo	Masahito Shinohara (JPN)	Im Ri-bin (PRK)	Munehisa Kuroiwa (JPN)
1990 Sapporo	Kazuhiro Sato (JPN)	Lü Shuhai (CHN)	Oh Yong-seok (KOR)
1996 Harbin	Mitsuru Watanabe (JPN)	Daigo Miyaki (JPN)	Yevgeniy Sanarov (KAZ)
1999 Gangwon	Radik Bikchentayev (KAZ)	Mun Jun (KOR)	Kazuki Sawaguchi (JPN)
2003 Aomori	Takahiro Nozaki (JPN)	Radik Bikchentayev (KAZ)	Kesato Miyazaki (JPN)
2007 Changchun	Hiroki Hirako (JPN)	Yeo Sang-yeop (KOR)	Dmitriy Babenko (KAZ)
2011 Astana–Almaty	Lee Seung-hoon (KOR)	Dmitriy Babenko (KAZ)	Hiroki Hirako (JPN)
2017 Sapporo	Lee Seung-hoon (KOR)	Ryosuke Tsuchiya (JPN)	Seitaro Ichinohe (JPN)
2025 Harbin	Wu Yu (CHN)	Liu Hanbin (CHN)	Hanahati Muhamaiti (CHN)

=== 10000 m ===
Games	Gold	Silver	Bronze
1986 Sapporo	Munehisa Kuroiwa (JPN)	Toshiaki Imamura (JPN)	Lü Shuhai (CHN)
1990 Sapporo	Kazuhiro Sato (JPN)	Lü Shuhai (CHN)	Toru Aoyanagi (JPN)
1996 Harbin	Shigekazu Nemoto (JPN)	Radik Bikchentayev (KAZ)	Yevgeniy Sanarov (KAZ)
1999 Gangwon	Toshihiko Itokawa (JPN)	Liu Guangbin (CHN)	Mun Jun (KOR)
2003 Aomori	Hiroki Hirako (JPN)	Kesato Miyazaki (JPN)	Naoki Yasuda (JPN)
2011 Astana–Almaty	Lee Seung-hoon (KOR)	Dmitriy Babenko (KAZ)	Hiroki Hirako (JPN)
2017 Sapporo	Lee Seung-hoon (KOR)	Ryosuke Tsuchiya (JPN)	Seitaro Ichinohe (JPN)

=== Mass start ===
Games	Gold	Silver	Bronze
2011 Astana–Almaty	Lee Seung-hoon (KOR)	Hiroki Hirako (JPN)	Dmitriy Babenko (KAZ)
2017 Sapporo	Lee Seung-hoon (KOR)	Shane Williamson (JPN)	Kim Min-seok (KOR)

=== Team sprint ===
Games	Gold	Silver	Bronze
2025 Harbin	China (CHN); Gao Tingyu; Lian Ziwen; Ning Zhongyan	South Korea (KOR); Kim Jun-ho; Cha Min-kyu; Cho Sang-hyeok	Japan (JPN); Katsuhiro Kuratsubo; Wataru Morishige; Kazuya Yamada

=== Team pursuit ===
Games	Gold	Silver	Bronze
2011 Astana–Almaty	Japan (JPN); Hiroki Hirako; Teppei Mori; Shota Nakamura	South Korea (KOR); Lee Kyou-hyuk; Lee Seung-hoon; Mo Tae-bum	Kazakhstan (KAZ); Dmitriy Babenko; Artem Beloussov; Alexandr Zhigin
2017 Sapporo	South Korea (KOR); Joo Hyong-jun; Kim Min-seok; Lee Seung-hoon	Japan (JPN); Shota Nakamura; Shane Williamson; Ryosuke Tsuchiya	Kazakhstan (KAZ); Dmitriy Babenko; Denis Kuzin; Fyodor Mezentsev
2025 Harbin	China (CHN); Liu Hanbin; Wu Yu; Hanahati Muhamaiti	South Korea (KOR); Chung Jae-won; Park Sang-eon; Lee Seung-hoon	Japan (JPN); Motonaga Arito; Taiyo Morino; Kotaro Kasahara

== Women ==
=== 100 m ===
Games	Gold	Silver	Bronze
2007 Changchun	Xing Aihua (CHN)	Wang Beixing (CHN)	Lee Sang-hwa (KOR)
2025 Harbin	Lee Na-hyun (KOR)	Kim Min-sun (KOR)	Chen Ying-chu (TPE)

=== 500 m ===
Games	Gold	Silver	Bronze
1986 Sapporo	Seiko Hashimoto (JPN)	Shoko Fusano (JPN)	Ye Qiaobo (CHN)
1990 Sapporo	Seiko Hashimoto (JPN)	Kyoko Shimazaki (JPN)	Yoo Sun-hee (KOR)
1996 Harbin	Wang Manli (CHN)	Shared gold	Jin Hua (CHN)
1996 Harbin	Xue Ruihong (CHN)	Shared gold	Jin Hua (CHN)
1999 Gangwon	Xue Ruihong (CHN)	Yang Chunyuan (CHN)	Wang Manli (CHN)
2003 Aomori	Wang Manli (CHN)	Yukari Watanabe (JPN)	Sayuri Osuga (JPN)
2007 Changchun	Wang Beixing (CHN)	Lee Sang-hwa (KOR)	Zhang Shuang (CHN)
2011 Astana–Almaty	Yu Jing (CHN)	Wang Beixing (CHN)	Lee Sang-hwa (KOR)
2017 Sapporo	Nao Kodaira (JPN)	Lee Sang-hwa (KOR)	Arisa Go (JPN)
2025 Harbin	Kim Min-sun (KOR)	Lee Na-hyun (KOR)	Tian Ruining (CHN)

=== 1000 m ===
Games	Gold	Silver	Bronze
1986 Sapporo	Wang Xiuli (CHN)	Han Chun-ok (PRK)	Shoko Fusano (JPN)
1990 Sapporo	Seiko Hashimoto (JPN)	Ye Qiaobo (CHN)	Wang Xiuli (CHN)
1996 Harbin	Chun Hee-joo (KOR)	Aki Tonoike (JPN)	Chihiro Monda (JPN)
1999 Gangwon	Xue Ruihong (CHN)	Yang Chunyuan (CHN)	Li Xuesong (CHN)
2003 Aomori	Aki Tonoike (JPN)	Wang Manli (CHN)	Shihomi Shinya (JPN)
2007 Changchun	Wang Beixing (CHN)	Wang Fei (CHN)	Ren Hui (CHN)
2007 Changchun	Wang Beixing (CHN)	Wang Fei (CHN)	Kim Yoo-rim (KOR)
2017 Sapporo	Nao Kodaira (JPN)	Miho Takagi (JPN)	Zhang Hong (CHN)
2025 Harbin	Han Mei (CHN)	Yin Qi (CHN)	Lee Na-hyun (KOR)

=== 1500 m ===
Games	Gold	Silver	Bronze
1986 Sapporo	Seiko Hashimoto (JPN)	Wang Xiuli (CHN)	Ye Qiaobo (CHN)
1990 Sapporo	Seiko Hashimoto (JPN)	Wang Xiuli (CHN)	Chong Chang-suk (PRK)
1996 Harbin	Lyudmila Prokasheva (KAZ)	Aki Tonoike (JPN)	Eriko Seo (JPN)
1999 Gangwon	Song Li (CHN)	Kanae Kobayashi (JPN)	Aki Narita (JPN)
2003 Aomori	Maki Tabata (JPN)	Aki Tonoike (JPN)	Baek Eun-bi (KOR)
2007 Changchun	Wang Fei (CHN)	Lee Ju-yeon (KOR)	Ji Jia (CHN)
2011 Astana–Almaty	Wang Fei (CHN)	Noh Seon-yeong (KOR)	Nao Kodaira (JPN)
2017 Sapporo	Miho Takagi (JPN)	Misaki Oshigiri (JPN)	Zhang Hong (CHN)
2025 Harbin	Han Mei (CHN)	Yang Binyu (CHN)	Yin Qi (CHN)

=== 3000 m ===
Games	Gold	Silver	Bronze
1986 Sapporo	Keiko Asao (JPN)	Natsue Seki (JPN)	Han Chun-ok (PRK)
1990 Sapporo	Seiko Hashimoto (JPN)	Natsue Seki (JPN)	Zhang Qing (CHN)
1996 Harbin	Lyudmila Prokasheva (KAZ)	Eriko Seo (JPN)	Saori Igami (JPN)
1999 Gangwon	Aki Narita (JPN)	Yuri Horikawa (JPN)	Song Li (CHN)
2003 Aomori	Maki Tabata (JPN)	Baek Eun-bi (KOR)	Eriko Ishino (JPN)
2007 Changchun	Wang Fei (CHN)	Masako Hozumi (JPN)	Maki Tabata (JPN)
2011 Astana–Almaty	Masako Hozumi (JPN)	Kim Bo-reum (KOR)	Wang Fei (CHN)
2017 Sapporo	Miho Takagi (JPN)	Kim Bo-reum (KOR)	Ayano Sato (JPN)
2025 Harbin	Yang Binyu (CHN)	Han Mei (CHN)	Tai Zhien (CHN)

=== 5000 m ===
Games	Gold	Silver	Bronze
2011 Astana–Almaty	Masako Hozumi (JPN)	Park Do-yeong (KOR)	Eriko Ishino (JPN)
2017 Sapporo	Kim Bo-reum (KOR)	Han Mei (CHN)	Mai Kiyama (JPN)

=== Mass start ===
Games	Gold	Silver	Bronze
2011 Astana–Almaty	Noh Seon-yeong (KOR)	Masako Hozumi (JPN)	Lee Ju-yeon (KOR)
2017 Sapporo	Miho Takagi (JPN)	Ayano Sato (JPN)	Kim Bo-reum (KOR)

=== Team sprint ===
Games	Gold	Silver	Bronze
2025 Harbin	South Korea (KOR); Kim Min-ji; Lee Na-hyun; Kim Min-sun	China (CHN); Yu Shihui; Tian Ruining; Han Mei	Kazakhstan (KAZ); Kristina Silaeva; Darya Vazhenina; Nadezhda Morozova

=== Team pursuit ===
Games	Gold	Silver	Bronze
2011 Astana–Almaty	South Korea (KOR); Lee Ju-yeon; Noh Seon-yeong; Park Do-yeong	China (CHN); Fu Chunyan; Ji Jia; Wang Fei	Japan (JPN); Eriko Ishino; Shiho Ishizawa; Miho Takagi
2017 Sapporo	Japan (JPN); Misaki Oshigiri; Nana Takagi; Ayano Sato	South Korea (KOR); Park Ji-woo; Noh Seon-yeong; Kim Bo-reum	China (CHN); Zhao Xin; Liu Jing; Han Mei
2025 Harbin	China (CHN); Yang Binyu; Ahenaer Adake; Han Mei	Japan (JPN); Yuka Takahashi; Yuna Onodera; Rin Kosaka	South Korea (KOR); Park Ji-woo; Jeong Yu-na; Kim Yoon-ji
