= Speed skating at the Asian Winter Games =

- Governing bodies: ISU (World) / ASU (Asia)
- Events: 14 (men: 7; women: 7)

Games
- 1986; 1990; 1996; 1999; 2003; 2007; 2011; 2017; 2025
- Medalists; Records

Speed skating has been featured as a sport in the Asian Winter Games since the first winter games in 1986.

== Editions ==
Games	Year	Host city	Best nation
I	1986	Sapporo, Japan	Japan
II	1990	Sapporo, Japan	Japan
III	1996	Harbin, China	Japan
IV	1999	Gangwon, South Korea	China
V	2003	Aomori, Japan	Japan
VI	2007	Changchun, China	China
VII	2011	Astana–Almaty, Kazakhstan	South Korea
VIII	2017	Sapporo, Japan	Japan
IX	2025	Harbin, China	China

== Events ==
Event	86	90	96	99	03	07	11	17	25	Years
Men's 100 m						X			X	2
Men's 500 m	X	X	X	X	X	X	X	X	X	9
Men's 1000 m	X	X	X	X	X	X		X	X	8
Men's 1500 m	X	X	X	X	X	X	X	X	X	9
Men's 5000 m	X	X	X	X	X	X	X	X	X	9
Men's 10000 m	X	X	X	X	X		X	X		7
Men's mass start							X	X		2
Men's team sprint									X	1
Men's team pursuit							X	X	X	3
Women's 100 m						X			X	2
Women's 500 m	X	X	X	X	X	X	X	X	X	9
Women's 1000 m	X	X	X	X	X	X		X	X	8
Women's 1500 m	X	X	X	X	X	X	X	X	X	9
Women's 3000 m	X	X	X	X	X	X	X	X	X	9
Women's 5000 m							X	X		2
Women's mass start							X	X		2
Women's team sprint									X	1
Women's team pursuit							X	X	X	3
Total	9	9	9	9	9	10	12	14	14	

== Medal table ==
Rank	Nation	Gold	Silver	Bronze	Total
1	Japan (JPN)	40	35	40	115
2	China (CHN)	27	22	21	70
3	South Korea (KOR)	26	28	25	79
4	Kazakhstan (KAZ)	4	6	9	19
5	North Korea (PRK)	0	2	2	4
6	Chinese Taipei (TPE)	0	0	1	1
Totals (6 entries)		97	93	98	288

== Participating nations ==
Nation	86	90	96	99	03	07	11	17	25	Years
Australia								1		1
China	9	16	15	10	15	17	14	20	19	9
Chinese Taipei								1	2	2
Hong Kong	1								2	2
India								3	9	2
Japan	18	18	18	18	20	14	13	19	17	9
Kazakhstan			9	6	7	12	12	10	18	7
Mongolia		2	1	1	4	6	3	4	1	8
New Zealand								1		1
North Korea	8	12				2	2			4
Qatar							4			1
South Korea	9	10	10	16	17	20	13	18	20	9
Thailand								1	1	2
Uzbekistan									1	1
Number of nations	5	5	5	5	5	6	7	10	10	
Number of athletes	45	58	53	51	63	71	61	78	90	
