= Speed skating at the 1996 Asian Winter Games =

- Venue: Heilongjiang Speed Skating Hall
- Dates: 5–9 February 1996
- Competitors: 53 from 5 nations

Speed skating at the 1996 Asian Winter Games took place in Heilongjiang Indoor Rink Harbin-Nangang in the city of Harbin, China with nine events contested — five for men and four for women. The events were scheduled for February 5– February 9, 1996.

== Schedule ==
●	Race	●	Last race	●	Final

Event↓/Date →	5th Mon	6th Tue	7th Wed	8th Thu	9th Fri
Men's 500 m	●	●			
Men's 1000 m				F	
Men's 1500 m			F		
Men's 5000 m	F				
Men's 10000 m					F
Women's 500 m	●	●			
Women's 1000 m				F	
Women's 1500 m			F		
Women's 3000 m	F				

== Medalists ==
=== Men ===
Event	Gold	Silver	Bronze
500 m	Jaegal Sung-yeol; South Korea	Shared gold	Kim Yoon-man; South Korea
500 m	Takahiro Hamamichi; Japan	Shared gold	Kim Yoon-man; South Korea
1000 m	Yusuke Imai; Japan	Kim Yoon-man; South Korea	Vadim Shakshakbayev; Kazakhstan
1500 m	Yusuke Imai; Japan	Shinya Tanaka; Japan	Sergey Tsybenko; Kazakhstan
5000 m	Mitsuru Watanabe; Japan	Daigo Miyaki; Japan	Yevgeniy Sanarov; Kazakhstan
10000 m	Shigekazu Nemoto; Japan	Radik Bikchentayev; Kazakhstan	Yevgeniy Sanarov; Kazakhstan

=== Women ===
Event	Gold	Silver	Bronze
500 m	Wang Manli; China	Shared gold	Jin Hua; China
500 m	Xue Ruihong; China	Shared gold	Jin Hua; China
1000 m	Chun Hee-joo; South Korea	Aki Tonoike; Japan	Chihiro Monda; Japan
1500 m	Lyudmila Prokasheva; Kazakhstan	Aki Tonoike; Japan	Eriko Seo; Japan
3000 m	Lyudmila Prokasheva; Kazakhstan	Eriko Seo; Japan	Saori Igami; Japan

== Medal table ==
Rank	Nation	Gold	Silver	Bronze	Total
1	Japan (JPN)	5	5	3	13
2	Kazakhstan (KAZ)	2	1	4	7
3	South Korea (KOR)	2	1	1	4
4	China (CHN)	2	0	1	3
Totals (4 entries)		11	7	9	27

== Participating nations ==
A total of 53 athletes from 5 nations competed in speed skating at the 1996 Asian Winter Games:

- China (15)
- Japan (18)
- Kazakhstan (9)
- Mongolia (1)
- South Korea (10)
