= China at the 1992 Winter Olympics =

- IOC code: CHN
- NOC: Chinese Olympic Committee
- Website: www.olympic.cn (in Chinese and English)

in Albertville
- Competitors: 32 (12 men, 20 women) in 6 sports
- Flag bearer: Song Chen
- Medals Ranked 15th: Gold 0 Silver 3 Bronze 0 Total 3

Winter Olympics appearances (overview)
- 1980; 1984; 1988; 1992; 1994; 1998; 2002; 2006; 2010; 2014; 2018; 2022; 2026

China competed at the 1992 Winter Olympics in Albertville, France. China won its first Winter Olympic medals at these Games.

== Medalists ==
Medal	Name	Sport	Event	Date
Silver	Ye Qiaobo	Speed skating	Women's 500 metres	10 February
Silver	Ye Qiaobo	Speed skating	Women's 1000 metres	14 February
Silver	Li Yan	Short track speed skating	Women's 500 metres	20 February

== Competitors ==
The following is the list of number of competitors in the Games.

Sport	Men	Women	Total
Alpine skiing	0	2	2
Biathlon	4	4	8
Cross-country skiing	1	2	3
Figure skating	2	2	4
Short track speed skating	1	4	5
Speed skating	4	6	10
Total	12	20	32

== Alpine skiing ==
Women

Athlete	Event	Race 1	Race 2	Total	
Athlete	Event	Time	Time	Time	Rank
Li Xueqin	Super-G			1:48.86	47
Liu Yali	Super-G			1:43.50	45
Liu Yali	Giant Slalom	1:25.91	1:25.21	2:51.12	38
Li Xueqin	Giant Slalom	1:19.88	1:25.91	2:45.79	35
Li Xueqin	Slalom	1:10.00	1:02.55	2:12.55	39
Liu Yali	Slalom	1:03.44	58.00	2:01.44	33

== Biathlon ==
Men

Event	Athlete	Misses ^{1}	Time	Rank
10 km Sprint	Tang Guoliang	1	30:22.6	75
10 km Sprint	Wang Weiyi	1	30:06.0	71
10 km Sprint	Tan Hongbin	2	29:55.9	70
10 km Sprint	Song Wenbin	1	29:39.3	63

Event	Athlete	Time	Misses	Adjusted time ^{2}	Rank
20 km	Song Wenbin	1'02:39.7	8	1'10:39.7	82
20 km	Tan Hongbin	1'02:24.1	5	1'07:24.1	75
20 km	Tang Guoliang	1'02:39.1	1	1'03:39.1	52
20 km	Wang Weiyi	1'00:30.0	3	1'03:30.0	50

Men's 4 x 7.5 km relay

Athletes	Race		
Athletes	Misses ^{1}	Time	Rank
Tan Hongbin; Tang Guolinag; Wang Weiyi; Song Wenbin	1	1'33:52.4	17

Women

Event	Athlete	Misses ^{1}	Time	Rank
7.5 km Sprint	Liu Guilan	DNF	DNF	–
7.5 km Sprint	Wang Jinping	1	28:42.4	52
7.5 km Sprint	Wang Jinfren	2	27:53.2	35
7.5 km Sprint	Song Aiqin	3	27:21.2	29

Event	Athlete	Time	Misses	Adjusted time ^{2}	Rank
15 km	Wang Jinfen	53:53.0	10	1'03:53.0	65
15 km	Wang Jinping	56:01.1	7	1'03:01.1	61
15 km	Liu Guilan	54:55.4	5	59:55.4	49
15 km	Song Aiqin	52:31.3	5	57:31.3	30

Women's 3 x 7.5 km relay

Athletes	Race		
Athletes	Misses ^{1}	Time	Rank
Wang Jinping; Liu Guilan; Song Aigin	4	1'23:51.0	12

^{1} A penalty loop of 150 metres had to be skied per missed target.
^{2} One minute added per missed target.

== Cross-country skiing ==
Men

Event	Athlete	Race	
Event	Athlete	Time	Rank
10 km C	Wu Jintao	34:45.9	80
15 km pursuit^{1} F	Wu Jintao	51:30.6	72
30 km C	Wu Jintao	1'38:54.5	68
50 km F	Wu Jintao	2'29:59.7	62

^{1} Starting delay based on 10 km results.
C = Classical style, F = Freestyle

Women

Event	Athlete	Race	
Event	Athlete	Time	Rank
5 km C	Wang Yan	17:56.8	58
5 km C	Gong Guiping	17:48.0	57
10 km pursuit^{2} F	Wang Yan	38:30.3	56
10 km pursuit^{2} F	Gong Guiping	36:46.3	55
15 km C	Wang Yan	50:57.3	47
15 km C	Gong Guiping	50:56.3	46
30 km F	Wang Yan	1'49:08.5	54
30 km F	Gong Guiping	1'43:08.2	53

^{2} Starting delay based on 5 km results.
C = Classical style, F = Freestyle

== Figure skating ==
Men

Athlete	SP	FS	TFP	Rank
Zhang Shubin	25	DNF	DNF	–

Women

Athlete	SP	FS	TFP	Rank
Chen Lu	11	5	10.5	6

Ice Dancing

Athletes	CD1	CD2	OD	FD	TFP	Rank
Han Bing; Yang Hui	18	18	18	18	36.0	18

== Short track speed skating ==
Men

Athlete	Event	Round one		Quarter finals		Semi finals		Finals	
Athlete	Event	Time	Rank	Time	Rank	Time	Rank	Time	Final rank
Li Lianli	1000 m	1:37.85	2 Q	1:33.90	4	did not advance			

Women

Athlete	Event	Round one		Quarter finals		Semi finals		Finals	
Athlete	Event	Time	Rank	Time	Rank	Time	Rank	Time	Final rank
Zhang Yanmei	500 m	DSQ	–	did not advance					
Wang Xiulan	500 m	47.49	1 Q	47.56	1 Q	48.04	3 QB	1:34.12	8
Li Yan	500 m	48.33	1 Q	48.33	1 Q	48.33	2 QA	47.08	2nd place, silver medalist(s)
Li Yan; Wang Xiulan; Zhang Yanmei; Li Changxiang	3000 m relay					DSQ	–	did not advance	

== Speed skating ==
Men

Event	Athlete	Race	
Event	Athlete	Time	Rank
500 m	Dai Jun	38.51	27
500 m	Liu Hongbo	37.66	11
500 m	Song Chen	37.58	9
1000 m	Dai Jun	1:19.21	40
1000 m	Liu Yanfei	1:17.59	30
1000 m	Song Chen	1:16.74	21
1500 m	Liu Yanfei	1:58.44	18
5000 m	Liu Yanfei	7:25.56	24

Women

Event	Athlete	Race	
Event	Athlete	Time	Rank
500 m	Wang Xiuli	DNF	–
500 m	Liu Yuexi	41.85	19
500 m	Xue Ruihong	41.47	13
500 m	Ye Qiaobo	40.51	2nd place, silver medalist(s)
1000 m	Xue Ruihong	1:25.11	27
1000 m	Liu Yuexi	1:24.71	22
1000 m	Ye Qiaobo	1:21.92	2nd place, silver medalist(s)
1500 m	Liu Junhong	2:11.61	24
1500 m	Zhang Qing	2:11.26	23
3000 m	Liu Junhong	4:49.13	26
3000 m	Zhang Qing	4:39.46	21
5000 m	Zhang Qing	8:04.71	18
5000 m	Liu Junhong	8:04.31	16
