= Speed skating at the 1996 Asian Winter Games – Men's 1000 metres =

Men's 1000 metres at the 1996 Asian Winter Games
- Venue: Heilongjiang Speed Skating Hall
- Dates: 8 February 1996
- Competitors: 13 from 4 nations

Medalists
gold medal	Yusuke Imai	Japan
silver medal	Kim Yoon-man	South Korea
bronze medal	Vadim Shakshakbayev	Kazakhstan

The men's 1000 metres at the 1996 Asian Winter Games was held on 8 February 1996 in Harbin, China.

== Records ==
Prior to this competition, the existing world and Games records were as follows.

World Record	Kevin Overland (CAN)	1:12.19	Calgary, Canada	23 December 1995
Games Record	Bae Ki-tae (KOR)	1:15.43	Sapporo, Japan	12 March 1990

== Results ==
Rank	Athlete	Time	Notes
1st place, gold medalist(s)	Yusuke Imai (JPN)	1:14.27	GR
2nd place, silver medalist(s)	Kim Yoon-man (KOR)	1:14.32	
3rd place, bronze medalist(s)	Vadim Shakshakbayev (KAZ)	1:14.53	
4	Liu Hongbo (CHN)	1:15.19	
5	Jaegal Sung-yeol (KOR)	1:15.23	
6	Toyoki Takeda (JPN)	1:15.63	
7	Kuniomi Haneishi (JPN)	1:15.97	
8	Wu Fenglong (CHN)	1:16.13	
9	Liu Hui (CHN)	1:16.38	
10	Lee Kyou-hyuk (KOR)	1:16.40	
11	Minetaka Sasabuchi (JPN)	1:16.71	
12	Vladimir Klepinin (KAZ)	1:16.96	
13	Wu Guanglu (CHN)	1:18.29	
