= Speed skating at the 1999 Asian Winter Games =

- Venue: Chuncheon Outdoor Ice Rink
- Dates: 2–5 February 1999
- Competitors: 51 from 5 nations

Speed skating at the 1999 Winter Asian Games took place in the city of Chuncheon, Gangwon, South Korea with nine events contested — five for men and four for women.

== Schedule ==
●	Race	●	Last race	●	Final

Event↓/Date →	2nd Tue	3rd Wed	4th Thu	5th Fri
Men's 500 m	●	●		
Men's 1000 m				F
Men's 1500 m			F	
Men's 5000 m	F			
Men's 10000 m				F
Women's 500 m	●	●		
Women's 1000 m				F
Women's 1500 m			F	
Women's 3000 m	F			

== Medalists ==
=== Men ===
Event	Gold	Silver	Bronze
500 m	Shoji Kato; Japan	Jaegal Sung-yeol; South Korea	Kazuya Nishioka; Japan
1000 m	Choi Jae-bong; South Korea	Lee Kyou-hyuk; South Korea	Chun Joo-hyun; South Korea
1500 m	Choi Jae-bong; South Korea	Chun Joo-hyun; South Korea	Hiromichi Ito; Japan
5000 m	Radik Bikchentayev; Kazakhstan	Mun Jun; South Korea	Kazuki Sawaguchi; Japan
10000 m	Toshihiko Itokawa; Japan	Liu Guangbin; China	Mun Jun; South Korea

=== Women ===
Event	Gold	Silver	Bronze
500 m	Xue Ruihong; China	Yang Chunyuan; China	Wang Manli; China
1000 m	Xue Ruihong; China	Yang Chunyuan; China	Li Xuesong; China
1500 m	Song Li; China	Kanae Kobayashi; Japan	Aki Narita; Japan
3000 m	Aki Narita; Japan	Yuri Horikawa; Japan	Song Li; China

== Medal table ==
Rank	Nation	Gold	Silver	Bronze	Total
1	China (CHN)	3	3	3	9
2	Japan (JPN)	3	2	4	9
3	South Korea (KOR)	2	4	2	8
4	Kazakhstan (KAZ)	1	0	0	1
Totals (4 entries)		9	9	9	27

== Participating nations ==
A total of 51 athletes from 5 nations competed in speed skating at the 1999 Asian Winter Games:

- China (10)
- Japan (18)
- Kazakhstan (6)
- Mongolia (1)
- South Korea (16)
