= Speed skating at the 1996 Asian Winter Games – Women's 1000 metres =

Women's 1000 metres at the 1996 Asian Winter Games
- Venue: Heilongjiang Speed Skating Hall
- Dates: 8 February 1996
- Competitors: 12 from 4 nations

Medalists
gold medal	Chun Hee-joo	South Korea
silver medal	Aki Tonoike	Japan
bronze medal	Chihiro Monda	Japan

The women's 1000 metres at the 1996 Asian Winter Games was held on 8 February 1996 in Harbin, China.

== Records ==
Prior to this competition, the existing world and Games records were as follows.

World Record	Christa Rothenburger (GDR)	1:17.65	Calgary, Canada	26 February 1988
Games Record	Seiko Hashimoto (JPN)	1:24.46	Sapporo, Japan	12 March 1990

== Results ==
Rank	Athlete	Time	Notes
1st place, gold medalist(s)	Chun Hee-joo (KOR)	1:23.30	GR
2nd place, silver medalist(s)	Aki Tonoike (JPN)	1:23.42	
3rd place, bronze medalist(s)	Chihiro Monda (JPN)	1:23.44	
4	Xue Ruihong (CHN)	1:23.58	
5	Lyudmila Prokasheva (KAZ)	1:24.13	
6	Tomomi Shimizu (JPN)	1:24.20	
7	Yang Xu (CHN)	1:24.43	
8	Kang Mi-young (KOR)	1:24.49	
9	Mayumi Kagawa (JPN)	1:25.10	
10	Jin Hua (CHN)	1:25.18	
11	Wang Manli (CHN)	1:25.20	
12	Yevgeniya Solomatina (KAZ)	1:28.81	
