= Speed skating at the 1996 Asian Winter Games – Men's 1500 metres =

Men's 1500 metres at the 1996 Asian Winter Games
- Venue: Heilongjiang Speed Skating Hall
- Dates: 7 February 1996
- Competitors: 14 from 4 nations

Medalists
gold medal	Yusuke Imai	Japan
silver medal	Shinya Tanaka	Japan
bronze medal	Sergey Tsybenko	Kazakhstan

The men's 1500 metres at the 1996 Asian Winter Games was held on 7 February 1996 in Harbin, China.

== Records ==
Prior to this competition, the existing world and Games records were as follows.

World Record	Johann Olav Koss (NOR)	1:51.29	Hamar, Norway	16 February 1994
Games Record	Bae Ki-tae (KOR)	2:00.48	Sapporo, Japan	11 March 1990

== Results ==
Rank	Athlete	Time	Notes
1st place, gold medalist(s)	Yusuke Imai (JPN)	1:56.18	GR
2nd place, silver medalist(s)	Shinya Tanaka (JPN)	1:57.45	
3rd place, bronze medalist(s)	Sergey Tsybenko (KAZ)	1:57.55	
4	Radik Bikchentayev (KAZ)	1:58.07	
5	Choi Jae-bong (KOR)	1:58.20	
6	Liu Hongbo (CHN)	1:58.82	
7	Liu Yanfei (CHN)	1:59.51	
8	Lee Kyou-hyuk (KOR)	2:00.07	
9	Hideyoshi Maruko (JPN)	2:00.16	
10	Minetaka Sasabuchi (JPN)	2:00.61	
11	Wu Guanglu (CHN)	2:01.19	
12	Feng Qingbo (CHN)	2:02.16	
13	Daniil Kokovin (KAZ)	2:02.22	
14	Vladimir Kostin (KAZ)	2:02.33	
