= Speed skating at the 1996 Asian Winter Games – Men's 500 metres =

Men's 500 metres at the 1996 Asian Winter Games
- Venue: Heilongjiang Speed Skating Hall
- Dates: 5–6 February 1996
- Competitors: 12 from 4 nations

Medalists
gold medal	Jaegal Sung-yeol	South Korea
gold medal	Takahiro Hamamichi	Japan
bronze medal	Kim Yoon-man	South Korea

The men's 500 metres at the 1996 Asian Winter Games was held in February 1996 in Harbin, China.

== Records ==
=== 500 meters ===
Prior to this competition, the existing world and Games records were as follows.

World Record	Dan Jansen (USA)	35.76	Calgary, Canada	30 January 1994
Games Record	Song Chen (CHN)	38.14	Sapporo, Japan	10 March 1990

=== 500 meters × 2 ===
Prior to this competition, the existing world and Games records were as follows.

World Record	Aleksandr Golubev (RUS)	1:14.92	Davos, Switzerland	11 January 1994
Games Record	—	—	—	—

== Results ==
Rank	Athlete	Race 1	Race 2	Total	Notes
1st place, gold medalist(s)	Jaegal Sung-yeol (KOR)	36.70	36.87	1:13.57	WR
1st place, gold medalist(s)	Takahiro Hamamichi (JPN)	36.69 GR	36.88	1:13.57	WR
3rd place, bronze medalist(s)	Kim Yoon-man (KOR)	36.94	36.85	1:13.79	
4	Liu Hongbo (CHN)	36.94	37.25	1:14.19	
5	Vadim Shakshakbayev (KAZ)	37.39	36.90	1:14.29	
6	Lee Kyou-hyuk (KOR)	37.47	37.58	1:15.05	
7	Kuniomi Haneishi (JPN)	37.52	37.66	1:15.18	
8	Minetaka Sasabuchi (JPN)	37.60	37.73	1:15.33	
9	Toyoki Takeda (JPN)	37.69	37.75	1:15.44	
10	Vladimir Klepinin (KAZ)	37.97	37.50	1:15.47	
11	Wu Fenglong (CHN)	38.07	38.29	1:16.36	
12	Liu Hui (CHN)	56.74	37.77	1:34.51	
