= Speed skating at the 1986 Asian Winter Games =

- Venue: Makomanai Open Stadium
- Dates: 1–4 March 1986
- Competitors: 45 from 5 nations

Speed skating at the 1986 Asian Winter Games took place in Makomanai Skating Centre Sapporo in the city of Sapporo, Japan with nine events contested – five for men and four for women.

== Schedule ==
| F | Final |

| Event↓/Date → | 1st Sat | 2nd Sun | 3rd Mon | 4th Tue |
|---|---|---|---|---|
| Men's 500 m | F | | | |
| Men's 1000 m | | | F | |
| Men's 1500 m | | F | | |
| Men's 5000 m | | F | | |
| Men's 10000 m | | | | F |
| Women's 500 m | F | | | |
| Women's 1000 m | | | F | |
| Women's 1500 m | | F | | |
| Women's 3000 m | | | | F |

== Medalists ==
=== Men ===
| Event | Gold | Silver | Bronze |
|---|---|---|---|
| 500 m | Akira Kuroiwa; Japan | Ra Yoon-soo; South Korea | Bae Ki-tae; South Korea |
| 1000 m | Bae Ki-tae; South Korea | Makoto Hirose; Japan | Akira Kuroiwa; Japan |
| 1500 m | Yukihiro Mitani; Japan | Munehisa Kuroiwa; Japan | Hwang Ik-hwan; South Korea |
| 5000 m | Masahito Shinohara; Japan | Im Ri-bin; North Korea | Munehisa Kuroiwa; Japan |
| 10000 m | Munehisa Kuroiwa; Japan | Toshiaki Imamura; Japan | Lü Shuhai; China |

=== Women ===
| Event | Gold | Silver | Bronze |
|---|---|---|---|
| 500 m | Seiko Hashimoto; Japan | Shoko Fusano; Japan | Ye Qiaobo; China |
| 1000 m | Wang Xiuli; China | Han Chun-ok; North Korea | Shoko Fusano; Japan |
| 1500 m | Seiko Hashimoto; Japan | Wang Xiuli; China | Ye Qiaobo; China |
| 3000 m | Keiko Asao; Japan | Natsue Seki; Japan | Han Chun-ok; North Korea |

== Medal table ==
| Rank | Nation | Gold | Silver | Bronze | Total |
|---|---|---|---|---|---|
| 1 | Japan (JPN) | 7 | 5 | 3 | 15 |
| 2 | China (CHN) | 1 | 1 | 3 | 5 |
| 3 | South Korea (KOR) | 1 | 1 | 2 | 4 |
| 4 | North Korea (PRK) | 0 | 2 | 1 | 3 |
| Totals (4 entries) | | 9 | 9 | 9 | 27 |

== Participating nations ==
A total of 45 athletes from 5 nations competed in speed skating at the 1986 Asian Winter Games:

- China (9)
- Hong Kong (1)
- Japan (18)
- North Korea (8)
- South Korea (9)
