= Speed skating at the 1999 Asian Winter Games – Men's 1500 metres =

Men's 1500 metres at the 1999 Asian Winter Games
- Venue: Chuncheon Outdoor Ice Rink
- Dates: 4 February 1999
- Competitors: 14 from 4 nations

Medalists
gold medal	Choi Jae-bong	South Korea
silver medal	Chun Joo-hyun	South Korea
bronze medal	Hiromichi Ito	Japan

The men's 1500 metres at the 1999 Asian Winter Games was held on 4 February 1999 in Chuncheon, South Korea.

== Schedule ==
All times are Korea Standard Time (UTC+09:00)

Date	Time	Event
Tuesday, 4 February 1999	11:00	Final

== Records ==
Prior to this competition, the existing world and Games records were as follows.

World Record	Ådne Søndrål (NOR)	1:46.43	Calgary, Canada	28 March 1998
Games Record	Yusuke Imai (JPN)	1:56.18	Harbin, China	7 February 1996

== Results ==
Rank	Pair	Athlete	Time	Notes
1st place, gold medalist(s)	7	Choi Jae-bong (KOR)	1:56.11	GR
2nd place, silver medalist(s)	1	Chun Joo-hyun (KOR)	1:58.04	
3rd place, bronze medalist(s)	4	Hiromichi Ito (JPN)	1:58.59	
4	5	Sergey Tsybenko (KAZ)	1:58.93	
5	7	Shigekazu Nemoto (JPN)	1:59.16	
6	5	Kazuki Sawaguchi (JPN)	1:59.45	
7	4	Vladimir Kostin (KAZ)	2:00.06	
8	3	Wan Chunbo (CHN)	2:00.26	
9	6	Park Jae-man (KOR)	2:00.54	
10	2	Liu Guangbin (CHN)	2:00.68	
11	6	Toshihiko Itokawa (JPN)	2:01.75	
12	1	Nikolay Ulyanin (KAZ)	2:02.12	
13	2	Choi Suk-yoo (KOR)	2:03.11	
14	3	Sergey Ilyushchenko (KAZ)	2:04.12	
