= Speed skating at the 1990 Asian Winter Games – Men's 500 metres =

Men's 500 metres at the 1990 Asian Winter Games
- Venue: Makomanai Open Stadium
- Dates: 10 March 1990
- Competitors: 14 from 4 nations

Medalists
| gold medal | Song Chen | China |
| silver medal | Bae Ki-tae | South Korea |
| bronze medal | Yasushi Kuroiwa | Japan |
| bronze medal | Yasunori Miyabe | Japan |

The men's 500 metres at the 1990 Asian Winter Games was held on 10 March 1990 in Sapporo, Japan.

== Records ==
Prior to this competition, the existing world and Games records were as follows.

| World Record | Uwe-Jens Mey (GDR) | 36.45 | Calgary, Canada | 14 February 1988 |
| Games Record | Akira Kuroiwa (JPN) | 38.20 | Sapporo, Japan | 1 March 1986 |

== Results ==
| Rank | Athlete | Time | Notes |
|---|---|---|---|
| 1st place, gold medalist(s) | Song Chen (CHN) | 38.14 | GR |
| 2nd place, silver medalist(s) | Bae Ki-tae (KOR) | 38.21 | |
| 3rd place, bronze medalist(s) | Yasushi Kuroiwa (JPN) | 38.34 | |
| 3rd place, bronze medalist(s) | Yasunori Miyabe (JPN) | 38.34 | |
| 5 | Hozumi Moriyama (JPN) | 38.43 | |
| 6 | Jaegal Sung-yeol (KOR) | 38.49 | |
| 7 | Liu Hongbo (CHN) | 38.89 | |
| 8 | Satoru Kuroiwa (JPN) | 38.95 | |
| 9 | Ri Yong-chol (PRK) | 39.01 | |
| 10 | Kim Yoon-man (KOR) | 39.05 | |
| 11 | Liu Wei (CHN) | 39.10 | |
| 12 | Ha Yong-il (PRK) | 39.37 | |
| 13 | Choi In-chol (PRK) | 40.45 | |
| 14 | Im Ri-bin (PRK) | 41.70 | |
