= Speed skating at the 1998 Winter Olympics – Men's 500 metres =

Speed skating at the Olympics

Men's 500 metres at the XVIII Olympic Winter Games
- Pictogram for speed skating
- Venue: M-Wave
- Dates: 9–10 February 1998
- Competitors: 42 from 16 nations
- Winning time: 1:11.35 OR

Medalists
1st place, gold medalist(s)		Hiroyasu Shimizu; Japan
2nd place, silver medalist(s)		Jeremy Wotherspoon; Canada
3rd place, bronze medalist(s)		Kevin Overland; Canada

The men's 500 metres in speed skating at the 1998 Winter Olympics took place on 9 and 10 February, at the M-Wave.

== Records ==
Prior to this competition, the existing world and Olympic records were as follows:

World record	Hiroyasu Shimizu (JPN)	35.39	Calgary, Canada	2 March 1996
Olympic record	Aleksandr Golubev (RUS)	36.33	Hamar, Norway	14 February 1994

The following new Olympic records were set during this competition.

Date	Athlete	Country	Time	OR	WR
9 February	Ermanno Ioriatti	Italy	36.30	OR	
9 February	Casey FitzRandolph	United States	35.81	OR	
9 February	Kevin Overland	Canada	35.78	OR	
9 February	Hiroyasu Shimizu	Japan	35.76	OR	
10 February	Hiroyasu Shimizu	Japan	35.59	OR	

== Results ==
Rank	Name	Country	Race 1	Race 2	Total	Notes
1st place, gold medalist(s)	Hiroyasu Shimizu	Japan	35.76	35.59	1:11.35	OR
2nd place, silver medalist(s)	Jeremy Wotherspoon	Canada	36.04	35.80	1:11.84	
3rd place, bronze medalist(s)	Kevin Overland	Canada	35.78	36.08	1:11.86	
4	Sylvain Bouchard	Canada	35.90	36.10	1:12.00	
5	Pat Bouchard	Canada	35.96	36.09	1:12.05	
6	Casey FitzRandolph	United States	35.81	36.39	1:12.20	
7	Kim Yun-Man	South Korea	36.13	36.23	1:12.36	
8	Lee Kyu-Hyuk	South Korea	36.14	36.41	1:12.55	
9	Ermanno Ioriatti	Italy	36.30	36.36	1:12.66	
10	Roger Strøm	Norway	36.53	36.15	1:12.68	
11	Michael Künzel	Germany	36.56	36.19	1:12.75	
12	Jan Bos	Netherlands	36.66	36.11	1:12.77	
13	Manabu Horii	Japan	36.37	36.41	1:12.78	
14	Sergey Klevchenya	Russia	36.56	36.30	1:12.86	
15	Hiroaki Yamakage	Japan	36.61	36.30	1:12.91	
16	Toshiyuki Kuroiwa	Japan	36.37	36.60	1:12.97	
16	Jegal Seong-Ryeol	South Korea	36.58	36.39	1:12.97	
18	Janne Hänninen	Finland	36.58	36.46	1:13.04	
19	Christian Breuer	Germany	36.78	36.41	1:13.19	
20	Aleksandr Golubev	Russia	36.67	36.54	1:13.21	
21	Jakko Jan Leeuwangh	Netherlands	36.69	36.54	1:13.23	
22	Paweł Abratkiewicz	Poland	36.76	36.51	1:13.27	
23	Marc Pelchat	United States	36.94	36.41	1:13.35	
24	Vadim Shakshakbayev	Kazakhstan	36.87	36.57	1:13.44	
25	Dave Cruikshank	United States	36.67	36.86	1:13.53	
26	Tomasz Świst	Poland	36.86	36.68	1:13.54	
27	Li Yu	China	36.79	36.79	1:13.58	
28	Liu Hongbo	China	36.77	36.95	1:13.72	
29	Roland Brunner	Austria	36.90	36.86	1:13.76	
30	Davide Carta	Italy	37.11	36.80	1:13.91	
31	Dai Dengwen	China	37.03	36.95	1:13.98	
32	Vladimir Klepinin	Kazakhstan	37.22	36.92	1:14.14	
33	Aleksandr Kibalko	Russia	37.32	36.86	1:14.18	
34	Kim Jin-su	South Korea	37.19	37.13	1:14.32	
35	Oleh Kostromitin	Ukraine	37.27	37.19	1:14.46	
36	Cory Carpenter	United States	37.35	37.76	1:15.11	
37	Zsolt Baló	Hungary	38.48	38.08	1:16.56	
38	Ids Postma	Netherlands	78.68	37.81	1:56.49	
-	Erben Wennemars	Netherlands	35.96	DNF	-	
-	Grunde Njøs	Norway	36.32	DNF	-	
-	Peter Adeberg	Germany	36.92	DNF	-	
-	Sergey Savelyev	Russia	DQ	-	-	
