= Speed skating at the 1996 Asian Winter Games – Men's 5000 metres =

Men's 5000 metres at the 1996 Asian Winter Games
- Venue: Heilongjiang Speed Skating Hall
- Dates: 5 February 1996
- Competitors: 12 from 5 nations

Medalists
gold medal	Mitsuru Watanabe	Japan
silver medal	Daigo Miyaki	Japan
bronze medal	Yevgeniy Sanarov	Kazakhstan

The men's 5000 metres at the 1996 Asian Winter Games was held on 5 February 1996 in Harbin, China.

== Records ==
Prior to this competition, the existing world and Games records were as follows.

World Record	Johann Olav Koss (NOR)	6:34.96	Hamar, Norway	13 February 1994
Games Record	Kazuhiro Sato (JPN)	7:16.98	Sapporo, Japan	10 March 1990

== Results ==
Rank	Athlete	Time	Notes
1st place, gold medalist(s)	Mitsuru Watanabe (JPN)	7:03.99	GR
2nd place, silver medalist(s)	Daigo Miyaki (JPN)	7:05.83	
3rd place, bronze medalist(s)	Yevgeniy Sanarov (KAZ)	7:06.21	
4	Shigekazu Nemoto (JPN)	7:08.72	
5	Sergey Tsybenko (KAZ)	7:10.48	
6	Choi Jae-bong (KOR)	7:14.41	
7	Radik Bikchentayev (KAZ)	7:14.84	
8	Wan Chunbo (CHN)	7:15.11	
9	Nyamdondovyn Ganbold (MGL)	7:29.61	
10	Liu Yanfei (CHN)	7:29.80	
11	Feng Qingbo (CHN)	7:31.29	
12	Jeong Seong-hyeon (KOR)	7:50.79	
