= Speed skating at the 1990 Asian Winter Games – Men's 10000 metres =

Men's 10000 metres at the 1990 Asian Winter Games
- Venue: Makomanai Open Stadium
- Dates: 13 March 1990
- Competitors: 15 from 5 nations

Medalists
| gold medal | Kazuhiro Sato | Japan |
| silver medal | Lü Shuhai | China |
| bronze medal | Toru Aoyanagi | Japan |

The men's 10000 metres at the 1990 Asian Winter Games was held on 13 March 1990 in Sapporo, Japan.

== Records ==
Prior to this competition, the existing world and Games records were as follows.

| World Record | Tomas Gustafson (SWE) | 13:48.20 | Calgary, Canada | 21 February 1988 |
| Games Record | Munehisa Kuroiwa (JPN) | 15:22.08 | Sapporo, Japan | 4 March 1986 |

== Results ==
| Rank | Athlete | Time | Notes |
|---|---|---|---|
| 1st place, gold medalist(s) | Kazuhiro Sato (JPN) | 16:03.63 | |
| 2nd place, silver medalist(s) | Lü Shuhai (CHN) | 16:15.38 | |
| 3rd place, bronze medalist(s) | Toru Aoyanagi (JPN) | 16:17.71 | |
| 4 | Naoki Kotake (JPN) | 16:23.98 | |
| 5 | Hidehiko Ichikawa (JPN) | 16:26.67 | |
| 6 | Lee In-hoon (KOR) | 16:35.72 | |
| 7 | Feng Qingbo (CHN) | 16:56.44 | |
| 8 | Song Yong-hun (PRK) | 17:01.89 | |
| 9 | Choi In-chol (PRK) | 17:01.92 | |
| 10 | Mendbayaryn Chimeddorj (MGL) | 17:11.01 | |
| 11 | Hao Gang (CHN) | 17:13.53 | |
| 12 | Liu Hongbo (CHN) | 17:28.51 | |
| 13 | Chi Song-guk (PRK) | 17:34.89 | |
| 14 | Oh Yong-seok (KOR) | 17:45.89 | |
| 15 | Altangadasyn Sodnomdarjaa (MGL) | 18:19.72 | |
