= Speed skating at the 1996 Asian Winter Games – Women's 1500 metres =

Women's 1500 metres at the 1996 Asian Winter Games
- Venue: Heilongjiang Speed Skating Hall
- Dates: 7 February 1996
- Competitors: 14 from 4 nations

Medalists
gold medal	Lyudmila Prokasheva	Kazakhstan
silver medal	Aki Tonoike	Japan
bronze medal	Eriko Seo	Japan

The women's 1500 metres at the 1996 Asian Winter Games was held on 7 February 1996 in Harbin, China.

== Records ==
Prior to this competition, the existing world and Games records were as follows.

World Record	Karin Kania (GDR)	1:59.30	Alma-Ata, Soviet Union	22 March 1986
Games Record	Seiko Hashimoto (JPN)	2:10.43	Sapporo, Japan	2 March 1986

== Results ==
Rank	Athlete	Time	Notes
1st place, gold medalist(s)	Lyudmila Prokasheva (KAZ)	2:08.50	GR
2nd place, silver medalist(s)	Aki Tonoike (JPN)	2:08.65	
3rd place, bronze medalist(s)	Eriko Seo (JPN)	2:09.59	
4	Chun Hee-joo (KOR)	2:09.86	
5	Yuri Horikawa (JPN)	2:11.46	
6	Baek Eun-bi (KOR)	2:11.64	
7	Yang Xu (CHN)	2:12.13	
8	Liu Yangmei (CHN)	2:12.68	
9	Saori Igami (JPN)	2:13.26	
10	He Xiaojing (CHN)	2:13.47	
11	Lee Kyung-nam (KOR)	2:13.60	
12	Ko Yeong-hee (KOR)	2:16.14	
13	Xi Chunrong (CHN)	2:16.95	
14	Yevgeniya Solomatina (KAZ)	2:17.13	
