= Speed skating at the 1990 Asian Winter Games – Men's 1500 metres =

Men's 1500 metres at the 1990 Asian Winter Games
- Venue: Makomanai Open Stadium
- Dates: 11 March 1990
- Competitors: 14 from 5 nations

Medalists
gold medal	Bae Ki-tae	South Korea
silver medal	Toru Aoyanagi	Japan
bronze medal	Lee In-hoon	South Korea

The men's 1500 metres at the 1990 Asian Winter Games was held on 11 March 1990 in Sapporo, Japan.

== Records ==
Prior to this competition, the existing world and Games records were as follows.

World Record	André Hoffmann (GDR)	1:52.06	Calgary, Canada	20 February 1988
Games Record	Yukihiro Mitani (JPN)	2:01.46	Sapporo, Japan	2 March 1986

== Results ==
Rank	Athlete	Time	Notes
1st place, gold medalist(s)	Bae Ki-tae (KOR)	2:00.48	GR
2nd place, silver medalist(s)	Toru Aoyanagi (JPN)	2:00.70	
3rd place, bronze medalist(s)	Lee In-hoon (KOR)	2:01.46	
4	Liu Yanfei (CHN)	2:01.80	
5	Toshiyuki Kuroiwa (JPN)	2:02.23	
6	Liu Wei (CHN)	2:02.45	
6	Choi In-chol (PRK)	2:02.45	
8	Oh Yong-seok (KOR)	2:02.84	
9	Naoki Kotake (JPN)	2:02.98	
10	Mutsuhiro Sato (JPN)	2:03.05	
11	Liu Hongbo (CHN)	2:03.78	
12	Wang Lianjun (CHN)	2:03.98	
13	Altangadasyn Sodnomdarjaa (MGL)	2:05.91	
14	Im Ri-bin (PRK)	2:07.22	
