= Speed skating at the 1990 Asian Winter Games – Men's 1000 metres =

Men's 1000 metres at the 1990 Asian Winter Games
- Venue: Makomanai Open Stadium
- Dates: 12 March 1990
- Competitors: 15 from 4 nations

Medalists
gold medal	Bae Ki-tae	South Korea
silver medal	Song Chen	China
bronze medal	Hozumi Moriyama	Japan

The men's 1000 metres at the 1990 Asian Winter Games was held on 12 March 1990 in Sapporo, Japan.

== Records ==
Prior to this competition, the existing world and Games records were as follows.

World Record	Pavel Pegov (URS); Igor Zhelezovski (URS)	1:12.58	Alma-Ata, Soviet Union; Heerenveen, Netherlands	25 March 1983; 25 February 1989
Games Record	Bae Ki-tae (KOR)	1:20.22	Sapporo, Japan	3 March 1986

== Results ==
Rank	Athlete	Time	Notes
1st place, gold medalist(s)	Bae Ki-tae (KOR)	1:15.43	GR
2nd place, silver medalist(s)	Song Chen (CHN)	1:16.94	
3rd place, bronze medalist(s)	Hozumi Moriyama (JPN)	1:17.05	
4	Toshiyuki Kuroiwa (JPN)	1:17.98	
5	Yasushi Kuroiwa (JPN)	1:18.14	
6	Mutsuhiro Sato (JPN)	1:18.34	
7	Kim Yoon-man (KOR)	1:19.20	
8	Jaegal Sung-yeol (KOR)	1:19.21	
9	Liu Yanfei (CHN)	1:19.68	
10	Ri Yong-chol (PRK)	1:19.74	
11	Wang Lianjun (CHN)	1:19.84	
12	Liu Wei (CHN)	1:19.95	
13	Ha Yong-il (PRK)	1:20.21	
14	Im Ri-bin (PRK)	1:21.57	
15	Kim Yoon-ahm (KOR)	1:26.88	
