= Speed skating at the 1996 Asian Winter Games – Men's 10000 metres =

Men's 10000 metres at the 1996 Asian Winter Games
- Venue: Heilongjiang Speed Skating Hall
- Dates: 9 February 1996
- Competitors: 8 from 4 nations

Medalists
gold medal	Shigekazu Nemoto	Japan
silver medal	Radik Bikchentayev	Kazakhstan
bronze medal	Yevgeniy Sanarov	Kazakhstan

The men's 10000 metres at the 1996 Asian Winter Games was held on 9 February 1996 in Harbin, China.

== Records ==
Prior to this competition, the existing world and Games records were as follows.

World Record	Johann Olav Koss (NOR)	13:30.55	Hamar, Norway	20 February 1994
Games Record	Munehisa Kuroiwa (JPN)	15:22.08	Sapporo, Japan	4 March 1986

== Results ==
Rank	Athlete	Time	Notes
1st place, gold medalist(s)	Shigekazu Nemoto (JPN)	14:34.72	GR
2nd place, silver medalist(s)	Radik Bikchentayev (KAZ)	14:42.59	
3rd place, bronze medalist(s)	Yevgeniy Sanarov (KAZ)	14:42.89	
4	Mitsuru Watanabe (JPN)	14:44.37	
5	Daigo Miyaki (JPN)	14:50.23	
6	Wan Chunbo (CHN)	14:56.23	
7	Sergey Tsybenko (KAZ)	15:04.14	
8	Choi Jae-bong (KOR)	15:11.81	
