= Speed skating at the 1996 Asian Winter Games – Women's 500 metres =

Women's 500 metres at the 1996 Asian Winter Games
- Venue: Heilongjiang Speed Skating Hall
- Dates: 5–6 February 1996
- Competitors: 9 from 3 nations

Medalists
gold medal	Wang Manli	China
gold medal	Xue Ruihong	China
bronze medal	Jin Hua	China

The women's 500 metres at the 1996 Asian Winter Games was held in February 1996 in Harbin, China.

== Records ==
=== 500 meters ===
Prior to this competition, the existing world and Games records were as follows.

World Record	Bonnie Blair (USA)	38.69	Calgary, Canada	2 February 1995
Games Record	Seiko Hashimoto (JPN)	41.68	Sapporo, Japan	1 March 1986

=== 500 meters × 2 ===
Prior to this competition, the existing world and Games records were as follows.

World Record	Monique Garbrecht (GER)	1:20.98	Berlin, Germany	19 November 1994
Games Record	—	—	—	—

== Results ==
Legend

- DSQ — Disqualified

Rank	Athlete	Race 1	Race 2	Total	Notes
1st place, gold medalist(s)	Wang Manli (CHN)	40.51 GR	40.92	1:21.43	GR
1st place, gold medalist(s)	Xue Ruihong (CHN)	40.66	40.77	1:21.43	GR
3rd place, bronze medalist(s)	Jin Hua (CHN)	40.78	40.99	1:21.77	
4	Chun Hee-joo (KOR)	41.34	41.29	1:22.63	
5	Chihiro Monda (JPN)	41.42	41.39	1:22.81	
6	Mayumi Kagawa (JPN)	41.40	41.48	1:22.88	
7	Shihomi Shinya (JPN)	41.63	41.63	1:23.26	
8	Kang Mi-young (KOR)	41.64	41.95	1:23.59	
—	Tomomi Shimizu (JPN)	41.76	DSQ	DSQ	
—	Xu Yanli (CHN)	41.65	DSQ	DSQ	
