= Speed skating at the 1986 Asian Winter Games – Men's 1000 metres =

Speed skating event

Men's 1000 metres at the 1986 Asian Winter Games
- Venue: Makomanai Open Stadium
- Dates: 3 March 1986
- Competitors: 12 from 5 nations

Medalists
gold medal	Bae Ki-tae	South Korea
silver medal	Makoto Hirose	Japan
bronze medal	Akira Kuroiwa	Japan

The men's 1000 metres at the 1986 Asian Winter Games was held on 3 March 1986 in Sapporo, Japan.

== Records ==
Prior to this competition, the existing world and Games records were as follows.

World Record	Pavel Pegov (URS)	1:12.58	Alma-Ata, Soviet Union	25 March 1983
Games Record	—	—	—	—

== Results ==
Rank	Athlete	Time	Notes
1st place, gold medalist(s)	Bae Ki-tae (KOR)	1:20.22	GR
2nd place, silver medalist(s)	Makoto Hirose (JPN)	1:20.37	
3rd place, bronze medalist(s)	Akira Kuroiwa (JPN)	1:20.67	
4	Hwang Ik-hwan (KOR)	1:22.47	
5	Kim Gwang-son (PRK)	1:23.20	
6	Ra Yoon-soo (KOR)	1:23.29	
7	Yasushi Kuroiwa (JPN)	1:23.30	
8	Yukihiro Mitani (JPN)	1:23.88	
9	Cho Yong-chol (PRK)	1:24.16	
10	Pan Dianzhong (CHN)	1:25.86	
11	Zhang Hong (CHN)	1:26.50	
12	Lau Wai Kay (HKG)	2:08.38	
