= North Korea at the 1988 Winter Olympics =

- IOC code: PRK
- NOC: Olympic Committee of the Democratic People's Republic of Korea

in Calgary
- Competitors: 6 (3 men, 3 women) in 2 sports
- Flag bearer: Im Ri-Bin (speed skating)
- Medals: Gold 0 Silver 0 Bronze 0 Total 0

Winter Olympics appearances (overview)
- 1964; 1968; 1972; 1976–1980; 1984; 1988; 1992; 1994; 1998; 2002; 2006; 2010; 2014; 2018; 2022; 2026

Other related appearances
- Korea (2018)

North Korea competed as the Democratic People's Republic of Korea at the 1988 Winter Olympics in Calgary, Alberta, Canada.

== Competitors ==
The following is the list of number of competitors in the Games.

Sport	Men	Women	Total
Figure skating	1	1	2
Speed skating	2	2	4
Total	3	3	6

== Figure skating ==
Men

Athlete	CF	SP	FS	TFP	Rank
Kang Ho	27	28	DNQ	DNF	–

Women

Athlete	CF	SP	FS	TFP	Rank
Kim Song-Suk	31	27	DNQ	DNF	–

== Speed skating ==
Men

Event	Athlete	Race	
Event	Athlete	Time	Rank
1500 m	Im Ri-Bin	1:55.55	17
5000 m	Im Ri-Bin	7:10.13	35
5000 m	Song Yong-Hun	7:01.56	28
10,000 m	Song Yong-Hun	DSQ	–

Women

Event	Athlete	Race	
Event	Athlete	Time	Rank
500 m	Han Chun-Ok	42.25	26
500 m	Song Hwa-Son	41.46	22
1000 m	Song Hwa-Son	DSQ	–
1000 m	Han Chun-Ok	1:24.26	23
1500 m	Han Chun-Ok	2:09.66	22
1500 m	Song Hwa-Son	2:05.25	9
3000 m	Song Hwa-Son	4:31.05	23
3000 m	Han Chun-Ok	4:29.16	17
5000 m	Han Chun-Ok	7:36.81	9
