= Speed skating at the 1999 Asian Winter Games – Men's 1000 metres =

Men's 1000 metres at the 1999 Asian Winter Games
- Venue: Chuncheon Outdoor Ice Rink
- Dates: 5 February 1999
- Competitors: 12 from 4 nations

Medalists
gold medal	Choi Jae-bong	South Korea
silver medal	Lee Kyou-hyuk	South Korea
bronze medal	Chun Joo-hyun	South Korea

The men's 1000 metres at the 1999 Asian Winter Games was held on 5 February 1999 in Chuncheon, South Korea.

== Schedule ==
All times are Korea Standard Time (UTC+09:00)

Date	Time	Event
Friday, 5 February 1999	11:05	Final

== Records ==
Prior to this competition, the existing world and Games records were as follows.

World Record	Jeremy Wotherspoon (CAN)	1:09.09	Calgary, Canada	15 January 1999
Games Record	Yusuke Imai (JPN)	1:14.27	Harbin, China	8 February 1996

== Results ==
Rank	Pair	Athlete	Time	Notes
1st place, gold medalist(s)	4	Choi Jae-bong (KOR)	1:14.74	
2nd place, silver medalist(s)	5	Lee Kyou-hyuk (KOR)	1:14.94	
3rd place, bronze medalist(s)	3	Chun Joo-hyun (KOR)	1:14.95	
4	1	Sergey Tsybenko (KAZ)	1:15.37	
5	6	Minetaka Sasabuchi (JPN)	1:15.52	
6	5	Yutaro Shinohara (JPN)	1:15.97	
7	4	Li Yu (CHN)	1:16.19	
8	6	Jaegal Sung-yeol (KOR)	1:16.25	
9	3	Kazuya Nishioka (JPN)	1:16.81	
10	1	Katsuhiro Kato (JPN)	1:16.91	
11	2	Sergey Ilyushchenko (KAZ)	1:20.08	
12	2	Liu Hongbo (CHN)	1:52.02	
