= Speed skating at the 1999 Asian Winter Games – Men's 500 metres =

Asian Games

Men's 500 metres at the 1999 Asian Winter Games
- Venue: Chuncheon Outdoor Ice Rink
- Dates: 2–3 February 1999
- Competitors: 11 from 4 nations

Medalists
gold medal	Shoji Kato	Japan
silver medal	Jaegal Sung-yeol	South Korea
bronze medal	Kazuya Nishioka	Japan

The men's 500 metres at the 1999 Asian Winter Games was held on 2 and 3 February 1999 in Chuncheon, South Korea.

== Schedule ==
All times are Korea Standard Time (UTC+09:00)

Date	Time	Event
Tuesday, 2 February 1999	13:25	1st race
Wednesday, 3 February 1999	10:55	2nd race

== Records ==
=== 500 meters ===
Prior to this competition, the existing world and Games records were as follows.

World Record	Hiroyasu Shimizu (JPN)	34.82	Calgary, Canada	28 March 1998
Games Record	Takahiro Hamamichi (JPN)	36.69	Harbin, China	5 February 1996

=== 500 meters × 2 ===
Prior to this competition, the existing world and Games records were as follows.

World Record	Hiroyasu Shimizu (JPN)	1:10.18	Calgary, Canada	28 March 1998
Games Record	Jaegal Sung-yeol (KOR); Takahiro Hamamichi (JPN)	1:13.57	Harbin, China	6 February 1996

== Results ==
Rank	Athlete	1st race		2nd race		Total	Notes
Rank	Athlete	Pair	Time	Pair	Time	Total	Notes
1st place, gold medalist(s)	Shoji Kato (JPN)	5	37.52	5	37.45	1:14.97	
2nd place, silver medalist(s)	Jaegal Sung-yeol (KOR)	6	37.89	3	37.22	1:15.11	
3rd place, bronze medalist(s)	Kazuya Nishioka (JPN)	4	37.61	5	37.51	1:15.12	
4	Chun Joo-hyun (KOR)	3	37.72	4	37.59	1:15.31	
5	Li Yu (CHN)	5	37.46	6	37.97	1:15.43	
6	Choi Jae-bong (KOR)	4	37.89	3	37.76	1:15.65	
7	Katsuhiro Kato (JPN)	3	37.45	6	38.29	1:15.74	
8	Lee Kyou-hyuk (KOR)	2	38.61	2	37.74	1:16.35	
9	Liu Hongbo (CHN)	2	38.62	2	38.48	1:17.10	
10	Sergey Ilyushchenko (KAZ)	1	40.34	1	40.58	1:20.92	
11	Minetaka Sasabuchi (JPN)	6	37.81	4	1:01.79	1:39.60	
