= Speed skating at the 1996 Asian Winter Games – Women's 3000 metres =

Women's 3000 metres at the 1996 Asian Winter Games
- Venue: Heilongjiang Speed Skating Hall
- Dates: 5 February 1996
- Competitors: 11 from 4 nations

Medalists
gold medal	Lyudmila Prokasheva	Kazakhstan
silver medal	Eriko Seo	Japan
bronze medal	Saori Igami	Japan

The women's 3000 metres at the 1996 Asian Winter Games was held on 5 February 1996 in Harbin, China.

== Records ==
Prior to this competition, the existing world and Games records were as follows.

World Record	Gunda Niemann (GDR)	4:09.32	Calgary, Canada	25 March 1994
Games Record	Seiko Hashimoto (JPN)	4:39.05	Sapporo, Japan	12 March 1990

== Results ==
Rank	Athlete	Time	Notes
1st place, gold medalist(s)	Lyudmila Prokasheva (KAZ)	4:25.98	GR
2nd place, silver medalist(s)	Eriko Seo (JPN)	4:28.84	
3rd place, bronze medalist(s)	Saori Igami (JPN)	4:34.29	
4	Baek Eun-bi (KOR)	4:35.09	
5	Yuri Horikawa (JPN)	4:35.12	
6	Lee Kyung-nam (KOR)	4:35.26	
7	Liu Yangmei (CHN)	4:42.83	
8	Ko Yeong-hee (KOR)	4:42.88	
9	Yang Xu (CHN)	4:43.07	
10	He Xiaojing (CHN)	4:46.81	
11	Yevgeniya Solomatina (KAZ)	4:50.25	
