= Speed skating at the 1999 Asian Winter Games – Men's 5000 metres =

Men's 5000 metres at the 1999 Asian Winter Games
- Venue: Chuncheon Outdoor Ice Rink
- Dates: 2 February 1999
- Competitors: 12 from 5 nations

Medalists
gold medal	Radik Bikchentayev	Kazakhstan
silver medal	Mun Jun	South Korea
bronze medal	Kazuki Sawaguchi	Japan

The men's 5000 metres at the 1999 Asian Winter Games was held on 2 February 1999 in Chuncheon, South Korea.

== Schedule ==
All times are Korea Standard Time (UTC+09:00)

Date	Time	Event
Thursday, 2 February 1999	11:05	Final

== Records ==
Prior to this competition, the existing world and Games records were as follows.

World Record	Gianni Romme (NED)	6:21.49	Calgary, Canada	27 March 1998
Games Record	Mitsuru Watanabe (JPN)	7:03.99	Harbin, China	5 February 1996

== Results ==
Legend

- DNF — Did not finish

Rank	Pair	Athlete	Time	Notes
1st place, gold medalist(s)	6	Radik Bikchentayev (KAZ)	7:16.46	
2nd place, silver medalist(s)	2	Mun Jun (KOR)	7:17.97	
3rd place, bronze medalist(s)	4	Kazuki Sawaguchi (JPN)	7:19.29	
4	5	Vladimir Kostin (KAZ)	7:20.16	
5	3	Toshihiko Itokawa (JPN)	7:20.40	
6	3	Liu Guangbin (CHN)	7:24.40	
7	6	Park Jae-man (KOR)	7:24.99	
8	2	Wan Chunbo (CHN)	7:32.76	
9	4	Nikolay Ulyanin (KAZ)	7:38.10	
10	5	Mitsuaki Tokumura (JPN)	7:39.41	
11	1	Choi Suk-yoo (KOR)	7:41.65	
—	1	Nyamdondovyn Ganbold (MGL)	DNF	
