= Speed skating at the 1999 Asian Winter Games – Men's 10000 metres =

Men's 10000 metres at the 1999 Asian Winter Games
- Venue: Chuncheon Outdoor Ice Rink
- Dates: 5 February 1999
- Competitors: 10 from 4 nations

Medalists
| gold medal | Toshihiko Itokawa | Japan |
| silver medal | Liu Guangbin | China |
| bronze medal | Mun Jun | South Korea |

The men's 10000 metres at the 1999 Asian Winter Games was held on 5 February 1999 in Chuncheon, South Korea.

== Schedule ==
All times are Korea Standard Time (UTC+09:00)

| Date | Time | Event |
|---|---|---|
| Friday, 5 February 1999 | 12:05 | Final |

== Records ==
Prior to this competition, the existing world and Games records were as follows.

| World Record | Gianni Romme (NED) | 13:08.71 | Calgary, Canada | 29 March 1998 |
| Games Record | Shigekazu Nemoto (JPN) | 14:34.72 | Harbin, China | 9 February 1996 |

== Results ==
| Rank | Pair | Athlete | Time | Notes |
|---|---|---|---|---|
| 1st place, gold medalist(s) | 2 | Toshihiko Itokawa (JPN) | 15:05.15 | |
| 2nd place, silver medalist(s) | 2 | Liu Guangbin (CHN) | 15:07.39 | |
| 3rd place, bronze medalist(s) | 5 | Mun Jun (KOR) | 15:08.91 | |
| 4 | 4 | Kazuki Sawaguchi (JPN) | 15:11.13 | |
| 5 | 4 | Radik Bikchentayev (KAZ) | 15:12.60 | |
| 6 | 3 | Choi Kun-won (KOR) | 15:25.24 | |
| 7 | 1 | Mitsuaki Tokumura (JPN) | 15:26.13 | |
| 8 | 5 | Vladimir Kostin (KAZ) | 15:33.75 | |
| 9 | 1 | Yoon Jung-jin (KOR) | 15:49.05 | |
| 10 | 3 | Nikolay Ulyanin (KAZ) | 15:57.69 | |
