= Speed skating at the 1986 Asian Winter Games – Men's 1500 metres =

Men's 1500 metres at the 1986 Asian Winter Games
- Venue: Makomanai Open Stadium
- Dates: 2 March 1986
- Competitors: 12 from 4 nations

Medalists
gold medal	Yukihiro Mitani	Japan
silver medal	Munehisa Kuroiwa	Japan
bronze medal	Hwang Ik-hwan	South Korea

The men's 1500 metres at the 1986 Asian Winter Games was held on 2 March 1986 in Sapporo, Japan.

== Records ==
Prior to this competition, the existing world and Games records were as follows.

World Record	Oleg Bozhev (URS)	1:53.26	Alma-Ata, Soviet Union	24 March 1984
Games Record	—	—	—	—

== Results ==
Rank	Athlete	Time	Notes
1st place, gold medalist(s)	Yukihiro Mitani (JPN)	2:01.46	GR
2nd place, silver medalist(s)	Munehisa Kuroiwa (JPN)	2:01.92	
3	Yuya Sakai (JPN)	2:02.16	
3rd place, bronze medalist(s)	Hwang Ik-hwan (KOR)	2:02.32	
5	Kimihiro Hamaya (JPN)	2:03.21	
6	Song Haiyu (CHN)	2:03.49	
7	Bae Ki-tae (KOR)	2:03.53	
8	Ra Yoon-soo (KOR)	2:03.74	
9	Cho Yong-chol (PRK)	2:03.78	
10	Zhang Hong (CHN)	2:06.43	
11	Kim Gwang-hyun (PRK)	2:07.65	
12	Im Ri-bin (PRK)	2:33.99	

- Hwang Ik-hwan was awarded bronze because of no three-medal sweep per country rule.
