= Short-track speed skating at the 1996 Asian Winter Games =

- Venue: Heilongjiang Multifunctional Hall

Short-track speed skating at the 1996 Asian Winter Games took place in the city of Harbin, China, with ten events being contested – five each for men and women.

== Medalists ==
=== Men ===
Event	Gold	Silver	Bronze
500 m	Li Jiajun; China	Kim Dong-sung; South Korea	Zhang Hongbo; China
1000 m	Chae Ji-hoon; South Korea	Song Jae-kun; South Korea	Kim Dong-sung; South Korea
1500 m	Li Jiajun; China	Chae Ji-hoon; South Korea	Lee Jun-hwan; South Korea
3000 m	Chae Ji-hoon; South Korea	Kim Dong-sung; South Korea	Song Jae-kun; South Korea
5000 m relay	South Korea; Chae Ji-hoon; Kim Dong-sung; Kim Sun-tae; Lee Jun-hwan	Japan; Hideto Imai; Takehiro Kodera; Satoru Terao; Hideharu Yokoyama	China; Feng Kai; Li Jiajun; Ma Yanjun; Zhang Hongbo

=== Women ===
Event	Gold	Silver	Bronze
500 m	Wang Chunlu; China	Sun Dandan; China	Yang Yang; China
1000 m	Chun Lee-kyung; South Korea	Won Hye-kyung; South Korea	Ikue Teshigawara; Japan
1500 m	Yang Yang; China	Chun Lee-kyung; South Korea	Kim Yun-mi; South Korea
3000 m	Kim Yun-mi; South Korea	Won Hye-kyung; South Korea	Chun Lee-kyung; South Korea
3000 m relay	China; Sun Dandan; Wang Chunlu; Yang Yang; Yang Yang	South Korea; An Sang-mi; Kim So-hee; Kim Yun-mi; Won Hye-kyung	Japan; Miwako Muraoka; Sachi Ozawa; Ikue Teshigawara; Nobuko Yamada

== Medal table ==
Rank	Nation	Gold	Silver	Bronze	Total
1	South Korea (KOR)	5	8	5	18
2	China (CHN)	5	1	3	9
3	Japan (JPN)	0	1	2	3
Totals (3 entries)		10	10	10	30
