= Speed skating at the 1986 Asian Winter Games – Women's 500 metres =

Women's 500 metres at the 1986 Asian Winter Games
- Venue: Makomanai Open Stadium
- Dates: 1 March 1986
- Competitors: 10 from 4 nations

Medalists
gold medal	Seiko Hashimoto	Japan
silver medal	Shoko Fusano	Japan
bronze medal	Ye Qiaobo	China

The women's 500 metres at the 1986 Asian Winter Games was held on 1 March 1986 in Sapporo, Japan.

== Records ==
Prior to this competition, the existing world and Games records were as follows.

World Record	Christa Rothenburger (GDR)	39.69	Alma-Ata, Soviet Union	25 March 1983
Games Record	—	—	—	—

== Results ==
Rank	Athlete	Time	Notes
1st place, gold medalist(s)	Seiko Hashimoto (JPN)	41.68	GR
2nd place, silver medalist(s)	Shoko Fusano (JPN)	42.53	
3	Akemi Tanaka (JPN)	42.73	
3rd place, bronze medalist(s)	Ye Qiaobo (CHN)	43.03	
5	Pak Gum-hyon (PRK)	43.16	
6	Choi Seung-youn (KOR)	43.45	
6	Song Hwa-son (PRK)	43.45	
8	Noriko Toda (JPN)	43.62	
9	Han Chun-ok (PRK)	44.03	
10	Wang Xiuli (CHN)	1:06.74	

- Ye Qiaobo was awarded bronze because of no three-medal sweep per country rule.
