= Speed skating at the 2002 Winter Olympics – Men's 500 metres =

Speed skating at the Olympics

Men's 500 metres at the XIX Olympic Winter Games
- Venue: Utah Olympic Oval
- Dates: 11–12 February 2002
- Competitors: 38 from 15 nations
- Winning time: 69.23 OR

Medalists
1st place, gold medalist(s)		Casey FitzRandolph; United States
2nd place, silver medalist(s)		Hiroyasu Shimizu; Japan
3rd place, bronze medalist(s)		Kip Carpenter; United States

The men's 500 m speed skating competition for the 2002 Winter Olympics was held in Salt Lake City, Utah, United States. The competition consisted of two separate 500 metre races, with the competitors ranked by their cumulative time from the two races.

Favorite Jeremy Wotherspoon fell in the first heat, taking him out of contention, but posted the fastest time in the second heat. Casey FitzRandolph became the first American to win the event since Eric Heiden in 1980.

== Records ==
Prior to this competition, the existing world and Olympic records were as follows.

500 meters (1 race)

World record	Hiroyasu Shimizu (JPN)	34.32	Salt Lake City, United States	March 10, 2001
Olympic record	Hiroyasu Shimizu (JPN)	35.59	Nagano, Japan	February 10, 1998

The following new world and Olympic records were set during this competition.

Date	Round	Athlete	Country	Time	OR	WR
February 11	Race 1	Kuniomi Haneishi	Japan	35.15	OR	
February 11	Race 1	Kip Carpenter	United States	34.68	OR	
February 11	Race 1	Hiroyasu Shimizu	Japan	34.61	OR	
February 11	Race 1	Casey FitzRandolph	United States	34.42	OR	

== Results ==
Rank	Name	Country	Race 1	Race 2	Total	Difference
1st place, gold medalist(s)	Casey FitzRandolph	United States	34.42 OR	34.81	69.23	–
2nd place, silver medalist(s)	Hiroyasu Shimizu	Japan	34.61	34.65	69.26	+0.03
3rd place, bronze medalist(s)	Kip Carpenter	United States	34.68	34.79	69.47	+0.24
4	Gerard van Velde	Netherlands	34.72	34.77	69.49	+0.26
5	Lee Kyou-hyuk	South Korea	34.74	34.85	69.59	+0.36
6	Joey Cheek	United States	34.78	34.82	69.60	+0.37
7	Mike Ireland	Canada	34.77	34.83	69.60	+0.37
8	Toyoki Takeda	Japan	35.00	34.81	69.81	+0.58
9	Jan Bos	Netherlands	35.14	34.72	69.86	+0.63
10	Erben Wennemars	Netherlands	35.00	34.89	69.89	+0.66
11	Dmitry Lobkov	Russia	35.09	35.01	70.10	+0.87
12	Kuniomi Haneishi	Japan	35.15	34.96	70.11	+0.88
13	Sergey Klevchenya	Russia	35.10	35.18	70.28	+1.05
14	Manabu Horii	Japan	35.30	35.02	70.32	+1.09
15	Janne Hänninen	Finland	35.18	35.15	70.33	+1.10
16	Pawel Abratkiewicz	Poland	35.40	35.04	70.44	+1.21
17	Choi Jae-bong	South Korea	35.45	35.12	70.57	+1.34
18	Dmitry Dorofeyev	Russia	35.48	35.27	70.75	+1.52
19	Michael Künzel	Germany	35.47	35.37	70.84	+1.61
20	Pat Bouchard	Canada	35.54	35.34	70.88	+1.65
21	Li Yu	China	35.62	35.35	70.97	+1.74
22	Tomasz Świst	Poland	35.72	35.55	71.27	+2.04
23	Davide Carta	Italy	35.70	35.69	71.39	+2.16
24	Eric Brisson	Canada	35.86	35.68	71.54	+2.31
25	Park Jae-man	South Korea	36.05	35.91	71.96	+2.73
26	Christian Breuer	Germany	36.50	35.57	72.07	+2.84
27	Ids Postma	Netherlands	36.41	36.08	72.49	+3.26
28	Marc Pelchat	United States	37.59	34.99	72.58	+3.35
29	Andriy Fomin	Ukraine	36.26	36.38	72.64	+3.41
30	Dino Gillarduzzi	Italy	36.42	36.27	72.69	+3.46
31	Zsolt Baló	Hungary	36.24	36.69	72.93	+3.70
32	Aleksey Khatylyov	Belarus	37.40	37.41	74.81	+5.58
33	Kim Cheol-su	South Korea	73.11	35.35	108.46	+39.23
34	Yu Fengtong	China	82.11	35.30	117.41	+48.18
35	Grunde Njøs	Norway	97.67	35.90	133.57	+64.34
-	Jeremy Wotherspoon	Canada	DNF	34.63	-	-
-	Ermanno Ioratti	Italy	36.30	-	-	-
-	Jan Friesinger	Germany	36.80	-	-	-
