= Speed skating at the 1986 Asian Winter Games – Men's 500 metres =

Men's 500 metres at the 1986 Asian Winter Games
- Venue: Makomanai Open Stadium
- Dates: 1 March 1986
- Competitors: 11 from 5 nations

Medalists
gold medal	Akira Kuroiwa	Japan
silver medal	Ra Yoon-soo	South Korea
bronze medal	Bae Ki-tae	South Korea

The men's 500 metres at the 1986 Asian Winter Games was held on 1 March 1986 in Sapporo, Japan.

== Records ==
Prior to this competition, the existing world and Games records were as follows.

World Record	Pavel Pegov (URS)	36.57	Alma-Ata, Soviet Union	26 March 1983
Games Record	—	—	—	—

== Results ==
Rank	Athlete	Time	Notes
1st place, gold medalist(s)	Akira Kuroiwa (JPN)	38.20	GR
2nd place, silver medalist(s)	Ra Yoon-soo (KOR)	38.58	
3rd place, bronze medalist(s)	Bae Ki-tae (KOR)	38.68	
4	Yoshihiro Kitazawa (JPN)	38.89	
5	Makoto Hirose (JPN)	38.93	
6	Yasushi Kuroiwa (JPN)	39.02	
7	Kim Gwang-hyun (PRK)	39.47	
7	Hwang Ik-hwan (KOR)	39.47	
9	Pan Dianzhong (CHN)	39.55	
10	Zhang Hong (CHN)	40.50	
11	Lau Wai Kay (HKG)	52.41	
