= Speed skating at the 1999 Asian Winter Games – Women's 3000 metres =

Women's 3000 metres at the 1999 Asian Winter Games
- Venue: Chuncheon Outdoor Ice Rink
- Dates: 2 February 1999
- Competitors: 9 from 4 nations

Medalists
gold medal	Aki Narita	Japan
silver medal	Yuri Horikawa	Japan
bronze medal	Song Li	China

The women's 3000 metres at the 1999 Asian Winter Games was held on 2 February 1999 in Chuncheon, South Korea.

== Schedule ==
All times are Korea Standard Time (UTC+09:00)

Date	Time	Event
Thursday, 2 February 1999	10:00	Final

== Records ==
Prior to this competition, the existing world and Games records were as follows.

World Record	Gunda Niemann-Stirnemann (GER)	4:01.67	Calgary, Canada	27 March 1998
Games Record	Lyudmila Prokasheva (KAZ)	4:25.98	Harbin, China	5 February 1996

== Results ==
Rank	Pair	Athlete	Time	Notes
1st place, gold medalist(s)	2	Aki Narita (JPN)	4:32.76	
2nd place, silver medalist(s)	4	Yuri Horikawa (JPN)	4:33.99	
3rd place, bronze medalist(s)	5	Song Li (CHN)	4:34.82	
4	2	Lu Yajun (CHN)	4:41.01	
5	3	Takako Toraguchi (JPN)	4:45.90	
6	4	Ko Yeong-hee (KOR)	4:47.31	
7	5	Lee Yong-ju (KOR)	4:47.65	
8	3	Byon Soon-gun (KOR)	4:48.37	
9	1	Kenzhesh Sarsekenova (KAZ)	5:01.13	
