= Speed skating at the 1999 Asian Winter Games – Women's 1500 metres =

Women's 1500 metres at the 1999 Asian Winter Games
- Venue: Chuncheon Outdoor Ice Rink
- Dates: 4 February 1999
- Competitors: 12 from 4 nations

Medalists
gold medal	Song Li	China
silver medal	Kanae Kobayashi	Japan
bronze medal	Aki Narita	Japan

The women's 1500 metres at the 1999 Asian Winter Games was held on 4 February 1999 in Chuncheon, South Korea.

== Schedule ==
All times are Korea Standard Time (UTC+09:00)

Date	Time	Event
Tuesday, 4 February 1999	10:00	Final

== Records ==
Prior to this competition, the existing world and Games records were as follows.

World Record	Anni Friesinger (GER)	1:56.95	Calgary, Canada	29 March 1998
Games Record	Lyudmila Prokasheva (KAZ)	2:08.50	Harbin, China	7 February 1996

== Results ==
Rank	Pair	Athlete	Time	Notes
1st place, gold medalist(s)	4	Song Li (CHN)	2:08.66	
2nd place, silver medalist(s)	4	Kanae Kobayashi (JPN)	2:09.68	
3rd place, bronze medalist(s)	3	Aki Narita (JPN)	2:10.93	
4	5	Baek Eun-bi (KOR)	2:13.04	
5	6	Lee Yong-ju (KOR)	2:13.29	
6	5	Yuri Horikawa (JPN)	2:14.73	
7	6	Takako Toraguchi (JPN)	2:15.28	
8	3	Li Xuesong (CHN)	2:15.74	
9	1	Byon Soon-gun (KOR)	2:16.74	
10	2	Lu Yajun (CHN)	2:16.83	
11	2	Ko Yeong-hee (KOR)	2:18.53	
12	1	Kenzhesh Sarsekenova (KAZ)	2:22.68	
