= Alpine skiing at the 1990 Asian Winter Games =

- Venue: Sapporo Teine
- Dates: 10–13 March 1990

Alpine skiing at the 1990 Asian Winter Games took place in the city of Sapporo, Japan from 10 to 13 March 1990 with four events contested — two each for men and women. Slalom events would later be substituted for Super Giant slalom events in the next Winter Asiad but reinstated in the 1999 Winter Asian Games in South Korea.

== Medalists ==
=== Men ===
Event	Gold	Silver	Bronze
Slalom	Keiji Oshigiri; Japan	Hideto Ito; Japan	Hur Seung-wook; South Korea
Giant slalom	Kiminobu Kimura; Japan	Toshinobu Awano; Japan	Takuji Kamibayashi; Japan

=== Women ===
Event	Gold	Silver	Bronze
Slalom	Waka Okazaki; Japan	Sachiko Yamamoto; Japan	Makiko Ito; Japan
Giant slalom	Sachiko Yamamoto; Japan	Waka Okazaki; Japan	Sachie Yoshida; Japan

== Medal table ==
Rank	Nation	Gold	Silver	Bronze	Total
1	Japan (JPN)	4	4	3	11
2	South Korea (KOR)	0	0	1	1
Totals (2 entries)		4	4	4	12
