= Speed skating at the 1986 Asian Winter Games – Men's 5000 metres =

Men's 5000 metres at the 1986 Asian Winter Games
- Venue: Makomanai Open Stadium
- Dates: 2 March 1986
- Competitors: 10 from 4 nations

Medalists
gold medal	Masahito Shinohara	Japan
silver medal	Im Ri-bin	North Korea
bronze medal	Munehisa Kuroiwa	Japan

The men's 5000 metres at the 1986 Asian Winter Games was held on 2 March 1986 in Sapporo, Japan.

== Records ==
Prior to this competition, the existing world and Games records were as follows.

World Record	Viktor Shasherin (URS)	6:49.15	Alma-Ata, Soviet Union	23 March 1984
Games Record	—	—	—	—

== Results ==
Rank	Athlete	Time	Notes
1st place, gold medalist(s)	Masahito Shinohara (JPN)	7:20.83	GR
2nd place, silver medalist(s)	Im Ri-bin (PRK)	7:28.37	
3rd place, bronze medalist(s)	Munehisa Kuroiwa (JPN)	7:30.17	
4	Yuya Sakai (JPN)	7:32.00	
5	Lü Shuhai (CHN)	7:33.71	
6	Kim Gwang-hyun (PRK)	7:33.78	
7	Toshiaki Imamura (JPN)	7:35.63	
8	Kim Kwan-kyu (KOR)	7:37.75	
9	Song Haiyu (CHN)	7:41.30	
10	Cho Yong-chol (PRK)	7:44.14	
