= Kim Jin-su (disambiguation) =

- Hangul: 김진수
- RR: Gim Jinsu
- MR: Kim Chinsu

Kim Jin-su or Kim Jin-soo (김진수) may refer to:

== Sports ==
- Kim Jin-su (born 1992), is a South Korean footballer.
- Kim Jin-su (speed skater) (born 1976), South Korean Olympic speed skater
- Kim Jin-su (bobsledder), South Korean bobsledder
- Kim Jin-su (speed skater, born 1992), South Korean speed skater, medalist at the 2020 Four Continents Speed Skating Championships
- Choi Jin-soo (born 1989), formerly known as Jin Soo Kim, South Korean basketball player
- Kim Jin-soo (wrestler) (born 1974), South Korean Greco-Roman wrestler

== Others ==
- Jin Soo Kim (born 1950), South Korean installation artist working in Chicago
- Kim Jin-soo (actor) (born 1971), South Korean actor and broadcaster, winner of a 2018 KBS Entertainment Award
- Kim Jin-soo (biologist) (born 1964), South Korean chemist, biologist, and entrepreneur
