= Jin Hua =

Jin Hua may refer to:

- Jin Hua (speed skater)
- Jin Hua (athlete)
