= Dai Jun =

Dai Jun may refer to:

- Dai Jun (swimmer)
- Dai Jun (speed skater)
