= Speed skating at the 1986 Asian Winter Games – Men's 10000 metres =

Men's 10000 metres at the 1986 Asian Winter Games
- Venue: Makomanai Open Stadium
- Dates: 4 March 1986
- Competitors: 9 from 4 nations

Medalists
gold medal	Munehisa Kuroiwa	Japan
silver medal	Toshiaki Imamura	Japan
bronze medal	Lü Shuhai	China

The men's 10000 metres at the 1986 Asian Winter Games was held on 4 March 1986 in Sapporo, Japan.

== Records ==
Prior to this competition, the existing world and Games records were as follows.

World Record	Geir Karlstad (NOR)	14:12.14	Inzell, West Germany	16 February 1986
Games Record	—	—	—	—

== Results ==
Rank	Athlete	Time	Notes
1st place, gold medalist(s)	Munehisa Kuroiwa (JPN)	15:22.08	GR
2nd place, silver medalist(s)	Toshiaki Imamura (JPN)	15:31.85	
3	Masahito Shinohara (JPN)	15:34.29	
3rd place, bronze medalist(s)	Lü Shuhai (CHN)	15:37.03	
5	Kim Kwan-kyu (KOR)	15:53.80	
6	Park Jin-hyun (KOR)	15:59.34	
7	Im Ri-bin (PRK)	16:02.22	
8	Yuya Sakai (JPN)	16:04.09	
9	Kim Gwang-hyun (PRK)	16:06.04	

- Lü Shuhai was awarded bronze because of no three-medal sweep per country rule.
