= Harbin Asian Winter Games =

Harbin Asian Winter Games may refer to two different Asian Winter Games held in Harbin:

- 1996 Asian Winter Games
- 2025 Asian Winter Games
