= Speed skating at the 1986 Asian Winter Games – Women's 3000 metres =

Women's 3000 metres at the 1986 Asian Winter Games
- Venue: Makomanai Open Stadium
- Dates: 4 March 1986
- Competitors: 13 from 4 nations

Medalists
gold medal	Keiko Asao	Japan
silver medal	Natsue Seki	Japan
bronze medal	Han Chun-ok	North Korea

The women's 3000 metres at the 1986 Asian Winter Games was held on 4 March 1986 in Sapporo, Japan.

== Records ==
Prior to this competition, the existing world and Games records were as follows.

World Record	Andrea Schöne (GDR)	4:20.91	Alma-Ata, Soviet Union	23 March 1984
Games Record	—	—	—	—

== Results ==
Rank	Athlete	Time	Notes
1st place, gold medalist(s)	Keiko Asao (JPN)	4:44.98	GR
2nd place, silver medalist(s)	Natsue Seki (JPN)	4:48.20	
3rd place, bronze medalist(s)	Han Chun-ok (PRK)	4:49.44	
4	Wang Xiuli (CHN)	4:49.53	
5	Bai Jiaxin (CHN)	4:50.39	
6	Zhang Qing (CHN)	4:51.22	
7	Chizuko Horata (JPN)	4:52.16	
8	Song Hwa-son (PRK)	4:52.66	
9	Pak Gum-hyon (PRK)	4:54.67	
10	Lee Kyung-ja (KOR)	4:56.44	
11	Wang Xiaoyan (CHN)	4:58.52	
12	Kim Hyeon-na (KOR)	5:01.32	
13	Hong Ok-nam (PRK)	5:04.06	
