= Speed skating at the 1986 Asian Winter Games – Women's 1500 metres =

Women's 1500 metres at the 1986 Asian Winter Games
- Venue: Makomanai Open Stadium
- Dates: 2 March 1986
- Competitors: 15 from 4 nations

Medalists
gold medal	Seiko Hashimoto	Japan
silver medal	Wang Xiuli	China
bronze medal	Ye Qiaobo	China

The women's 1500 metres at the 1986 Asian Winter Games was held on 2 March 1986 in Sapporo, Japan.

== Records ==
Prior to this competition, the existing world and Games records were as follows.

World Record	Andrea Schöne (GDR)	2:03.34	Alma-Ata, Soviet Union	24 March 1984
Games Record	—	—	—	—

== Results ==
Rank	Athlete	Time	Notes
1st place, gold medalist(s)	Seiko Hashimoto (JPN)	2:10.43	GR
2nd place, silver medalist(s)	Wang Xiuli (CHN)	2:11.62	
3rd place, bronze medalist(s)	Ye Qiaobo (CHN)	2:14.02	
4	Song Hwa-son (PRK)	2:15.02	
5	Chizuko Horata (JPN)	2:15.09	
6	Pak Gum-hyon (PRK)	2:15.21	
7	Zhang Qing (CHN)	2:16.09	
8	Keiko Asao (JPN)	2:16.48	
9	Han Chun-ok (PRK)	2:16.81	
10	Bai Jiaxin (CHN)	2:18.34	
11	Kim Young-ok (KOR)	2:18.49	
12	Kim Hyeon-na (KOR)	2:18.67	
13	Lee Kyung-ja (KOR)	2:21.99	
14	Yumi Kaeriyama (JPN)	2:24.10	
15	Hong Ok-nam (PRK)	2:24.17	
