= Marc Pelchat =

American speed skater

Personal information
- Nationality: American
- Born: September 16, 1967 (age 58) Chelmsford, Massachusetts, United States

Sport
- Sport: Speed skating

Marc Pelchat (born September 16, 1967) is an American speed skater. He is from Chelmsford, Massachusetts and attended Chelmsford High School and Northern Michigan University. He competed in men's 500 metres at the 1998 Winter Olympics in Nagano and the 2002 Winter Olympics in Salt Lake City, where he placed 23rd and 28th respectively.
