= Hyowon High School =

- 효원고등학교

Location
- Dongsuwon-ro 336 Suwon-si Gyeonggi-do; South Korea
- Coordinates: 37°15′32″N 127°2′19″E

Information
- Type: Public
- Motto: 성실 (Sincerity)
- Established: 1 March 1988
- Principal: Kim Jae-tak (김재탁)
- Faculty: 127 (as of 2014)
- Grades: 10–12
- Enrollment: 1,721 (as of 2014)
- Campus size: 14,419.4 m^{2}
- Color: Ultramarine
- Tree: Keyaki
- Flower: Royal Azalea
- Animal: Tiger
- Website: www.hyowon.hs.kr

Hyowon High School (Korean: 효원고등학교) is a public high school located in Suwon, South Korea.

== History ==
- Jan 16, 1987 - The construction of the school was allowed. (10 classes)
- Mar 1, 1988 - The school was founded and The 1st principal Cho Dong-hyun (조동현) took office.
- Feb 8, 1991 - The 1st graduation. (Boys : 446, Girls : 112)
- Mar 2, 1995 - The 3rd Yun Dae-cheol (윤대철) principal took office.
- Feb 9, 2000 - The 10th graduation. (Boys : 439, Girls : 216)
- Mar 1, 2006 - The 7th Ryu Doh-Hyung (류도형) principal took office.
- Mar 1, 2010 - The 9th Min Wung-gi (민웅기) principal took office.
- Sep 1, 2013 - The 10th Kim Jae-tak (김재탁) principal took office.
- Feb 6, 2014 - The 24th graduation. (Boys : 296, Girls : 285)
- Mar 3, 2014 - The 27th entrance ceremony. (Boys : 282, Girls : 256)

== Notable alumni ==
- Choi Jae-bong, a speed skater
- Hyun Hee, a épée fencer
- Oh Kyo-moon, an archer
