= Shoko Fusano =

Japanese speed skater (born 1965)

Personal information
- Nationality: Japanese
- Born: 25 September 1965 (age 60) Tomakomai, Hokkaido, Japan

Sport
- Country: Japan
- Sport: Speed skating
Medal record
Asian Winter Games
Silver medal – second place	1986 Sapporo	500 m
Bronze medal – third place	1986 Sapporo	1000 m

Shoko Fusano (房野 抄子, Fusano Shōko; born 25 September 1965) is a Japanese speed skater. She competed at the 1984 Winter Olympics and the 1988 Winter Olympics.
