= Sergey Savelyev (speed skater) =

Russian speed skater

Personal information
- Nationality: Russian
- Born: 18 April 1972 (age 52); Ivanovo, Russia

Sport
- Sport: Speed skating

Sergey Savelyev (born 18 April 1972) is a Russian speed skater. He competed in the men's 500 metres event at the 1998 Winter Olympics.
