= Short-track speed skating at the 1990 Asian Winter Games =

- Venue: Mikaho Gymnasium
- Dates: 9–10 March 1990

Short-track speed skating at the 1990 Asian Winter Games took place in the city of Sapporo, Japan, with ten events contested – five each for men and women. Relay events for both men and women were added in this edition of the Winter Asiad.

== Medalists ==
=== Men ===
Event	Gold	Silver	Bronze
500 m	Wang Qiang; China	Kim Ki-hoon; South Korea	Wang Quanjun; China
1000 m	Kim Ki-hoon; South Korea	Ri Won-ho; North Korea	Kwon Young-chul; South Korea
1500 m	Kim Ki-hoon; South Korea	Lee Joon-ho; South Korea	Kenichi Sugio; Japan
3000 m	Shuji Kawai; Japan	Lee Joon-ho; South Korea	Jun Uematsu; Japan
5000 m relay	South Korea; Kim Ki-hoon; Kwon Young-chul; Lee Joon-ho; Mo Ji-soo	Japan	China

=== Women ===
Event	Gold	Silver	Bronze
500 m	Wang Xiulan; China	Zhang Yanmei; China	Zheng Chunyang; China
1000 m	Wang Xiulan; China	Lee Hyun-jung; South Korea	Chun Lee-kyung; South Korea
1500 m	Kim So-hee; South Korea	Zhang Yanmei; China	Li Yan; China
3000 m	Zhang Yanmei; China	Keiko Asai; Japan	Ri Gyong-hui; North Korea
3000 m relay	China; Li Yan; Wang Xiulan; Zhang Yanmei; Zheng Chunyang	South Korea; Chun Lee-kyung; Kim So-hee; Lee Hyun-jung; Lee Yun-sook	Japan

== Medal table ==
Rank	Nation	Gold	Silver	Bronze	Total
1	China (CHN)	5	2	4	11
2	South Korea (KOR)	4	5	2	11
3	Japan (JPN)	1	2	3	6
4	North Korea (PRK)	0	1	1	2
Totals (4 entries)		10	10	10	30
