= Éric Brisson =

Canadian speed skater

Personal information
- Born: 8 December 1973 (age 51); Greenfield Park, Quebec, Canada

Sport
- Sport: Speed skating

Éric Brisson (born 8 December 1973) is a Canadian speed skater. He competed in the men's 500 metres event at the 2002 Winter Olympics.
