= Wang Manli =

Chinese speed skater

Personal information
- Born: 17 March 1973 (age 53) Mudanjiang, China

Sport
- Country: China
- Sport: Speed skating
Medal record
Women's speed skating
Olympic Games
| Silver medal – second place | 2006 Turin | 500m |
World Championships
| Gold medal – first place | 2005 Inzell | 500 m |
| Gold medal – first place | 2004 Seoul | 500 m |
| Silver medal – second place | 2003 Berlin | 500 m |
| Silver medal – second place | 2006 Heerenveen | Sprint |
Asian Winter Games
| Gold medal – first place | 1996 Harbin | 500 m |
| Gold medal – first place | 2003 Aomori | 500 m |
| Silver medal – second place | 2003 Aomori | 1000 m |
| Bronze medal – third place | 1999 Kangwon | 500 m |

Wang Manli (Chinese: 王曼丽, Wáng Mànlì, born 17 March 1973) is a Chinese ice speed skater who won a silver medal in the Women's 500 m at the 2006 Winter Olympics.
