= Li Xueqin (skier) =

Chinese alpine skier (born 1975)

Personal information
- Nationality: Chinese
- Born: 1 March 1975 (age 50); Jilin, China

Sport
- Sport: Alpine skiing

Li Xueqin (born 1 March 1975) is a Chinese alpine skier. She competed in three events at the 1992 Winter Olympics.
