= Casey FitzRandolph =

American speed skater

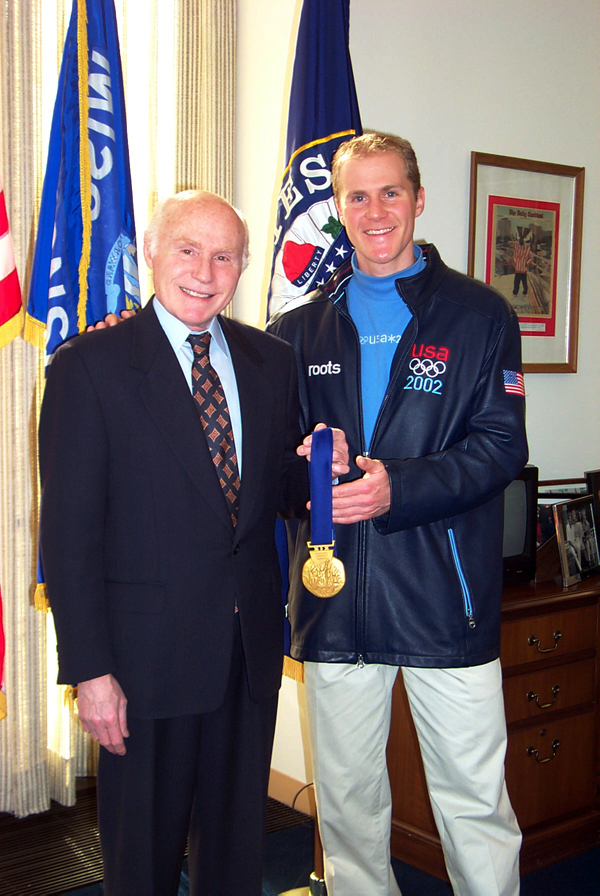
- FitzRandolph with Senator Herb Kohl after the 2002 Winter Olympics

Personal information
- Born: January 21, 1975 (age 51) Verona, Wisconsin, U.S.
- Height: 5 ft 11 in (1.80 m)
- Weight: 179 lb (81 kg)
- Website: www.caseyfitz.com

Sport
- Country: United States
- Sport: Speed skating
Medal record
Men's speed skating
Representing the United States
Olympic Games
Gold medal – first place	2002 Salt Lake City	500 m
World Sprint Championships
Silver medal – second place	2002 Hamar	Sprint
Bronze medal – third place	1997 Hamar	Sprint
World Single Distance Championships
Bronze medal – third place	2001 Salt Lake City	500 m

Casey J. FitzRandolph (born January 21, 1975 in Verona, Wisconsin) is an American speed skater.

In 1997, FitzRandolph won the bronze medal at the World Sprint Championships in Hamar. He won another bronze medal in 2001 at the World Single Distance Championships on the 500 m.

In 2002, he won silver at the World Sprint Championships in Hamar and went on to become Olympic Champion on the 500 m at the 2002 Winter Olympics in Salt Lake City. This made him the first American to win the 500 m since fellow Madison native Eric Heiden won the event in 1980. Heiden was in attendance as the team orthopedist. He and his family now live in Cross Plains Wisconsin.

At the 2006 Winter Olympics in Turin, FitzRandolph finished 12th on the 500 m and 9th on the 1,000 m.
