= Yang Hui (figure skater) =

Chinese ice dancer

Personal information
- Nationality: Chinese
- Born: 15 March 1967 (age 58)

Sport
- Sport: Figure skating

Yang Hui (Chinese: 杨晖; pinyin: Yáng Huī, born 15 March 1967) is a Chinese ice dancer. He competed in the ice dance event at the 1992 Winter Olympics with Han Bing.
