= Song Wenbin =

Chinese biathlete (born 1963)

Personal information
- Nationality: Chinese
- Born: 5 January 1963 (age 62); Liaoning, China

Sport
- Sport: Biathlon

Song Wenbin (born 5 January 1963) is a Chinese biathlete. He competed at the 1984 Winter Olympics and the 1992 Winter Olympics.
