= Kevin Overland =

Canadian speed skater

Personal information
- Born: June 8, 1974 (age 52) Kitchener, Ontario, Canada

Sport
- Country: Canada
- Sport: Speed skating
Medal record
Men's speed skating
Representing Canada
Olympic Games
Bronze medal – third place	1998 Nagano	500 m

Kevin Overland, or Kevin Crockett (born June 8, 1974) is a Canadian former Olympic and ISU Speed Skating World Cup medallist and present-day Speed Skating Canada national sprint team coach. He won the Olympic bronze medal in the 500 metres event at the 1998 Winter Olympics. Crockett also set two world records during his career as a skater.

== Personal ==
He is the brother of fellow Olympians Cindy Overland and Amanda Overland. His father Ernie is also a coach. Following his competitive career, he changed his last name to honour his deceased grandfather and now goes by Kevin Crockett.

== Coaching ==
Crockett has coached Olympic and World Championship medalists, including Wang Beixing of China. In 2012 he became the coach of South Korea's national team including Lee Sang-hwa and world 500 metre champion Mo Tae-bum. He currently coaches the sprint members on Canada's long track speed skating team.

Crockett joined Speed Skating Canada's coaching staff after a two-year stay in South Korea where he was the head coach of the long track national team through several world Championships and the 2014 Sochi Olympic Games.

He worked with Mo Tae-bum, a gold medalist in the 500m distance at the 2010 Olympic Games and the 500m World Champion at the 2012 and 2013 World Single Distance Championships, as well as with Lee Sang-hwa, the 2010 and 2014 Olympic gold medalist in the 500m event and 500m World Champion in 2012 and 2013 at the World Single Distance Championships. Lee also broke the 500 m world record four times since January 2013. She held the world record with a time of 36.36 for 12 years until Femke Kok broke it on 16 November 2025.

== Athletes ==
Crockett's sprint team includes Canadian national team skaters: Gilmore Junio, William Dutton, Heather McLean and Marsha Hudey; he also coaches international skaters: Mika Poutala, Lee Sang-hwa and Maki Tsuji.

== World records ==
Event	Time	Date	Venue
1000 m	1:12.19	23 December 1995	Olympic Oval, Calgary
1500 m	1:49.07	29 November 1997	Olympic Oval, Calgary

Source: SpeedSkatingStats.com
