= Kim Jin-su (speed skater) =

South Korean speed skater

Personal information
- Nationality: South Korean
- Born: 19 July 1976 (age 48)

Sport
- Sport: Speed skating

Kim Jin-su (born 19 July 1976) is a South Korean speed skater. He competed in the men's 500 metres event at the 1998 Winter Olympics.
