= Liu Guilan =

Chinese biathlete

Personal information
- Nationality: Chinese
- Born: 12 February 1971 (age 54)

Sport
- Sport: Biathlon

Liu Guilan (Chinese: 刘桂兰; pinyin: Liú Guìlán, born 12 February 1971) is a Chinese biathlete. She competed at the 1992 Winter Olympics and the 1994 Winter Olympics.
