= Wang Jinping (biathlete) =

Chinese biathlete

Personal information
- Nationality: Chinese
- Born: 11 May 1971 (age 53)

Sport
- Sport: Biathlon

Wang Jinping (Chinese: 王锦萍, born 11 May 1971) is a Chinese biathlete. She competed at the 1992 Winter Olympics and the 1994 Winter Olympics. She is the younger sister of her teammate Wang Jinfen.
