= Masahito Shinohara =

Japanese speed skater (born 1961)

Personal information
- Nationality: Japanese
- Born: 10 May 1961 (age 65) Hokkaido, Japan

Sport
- Country: Japan
- Sport: Speed skating
Medal record
Asian Winter Games
| Gold medal – first place | 1986 Sapporo | 5000 m |

Masahito Shinohara (born 10 May 1961) is a Japanese speed skater. He competed in two events at the 1984 Winter Olympics.
