= Toshiaki Imamura =

Japanese speed skater (born 1962)

Personal information
- Nationality: Japanese
- Born: 11 May 1962 (age 64) Okaya, Japan

Sport
- Country: Japan
- Sport: Speed skating
Medal record
Asian Winter Games
Silver medal – second place	1986 Sapporo	10,000 m

Toshiaki Imamura (born 11 May 1962) is a Japanese speed skater. He competed in two events at the 1984 Winter Olympics.
