= Tang Guoliang =

Chinese biathlete

Personal information
- Nationality: Chinese
- Born: 10 April 1969 (age 55)

Sport
- Sport: Biathlon

Tang Guoliang (born 10 April 1969) is a Chinese biathlete. He competed in the men's 20 km individual event at the 1992 Winter Olympics.
