= Speed skating at the 1986 Asian Winter Games – Women's 1000 metres =

Women's 1000 metres at the 1986 Asian Winter Games
- Venue: Makomanai Open Stadium
- Dates: 3 March 1986
- Competitors: 10 from 4 nations

Medalists
gold medal	Wang Xiuli	China
silver medal	Han Chun-ok	North Korea
bronze medal	Shoko Fusano	Japan

The women's 1000 metres at the 1986 Asian Winter Games was held on 3 March 1986 in Sapporo, Japan.

== Records ==
Prior to this competition, the existing world and Games records were as follows.

World Record	Karin Kania (GDR)	1:18.84	Karuizawa, Japan	22 February 1986
Games Record	—	—	—	—

== Results ==
Rank	Athlete	Time	Notes
1st place, gold medalist(s)	Wang Xiuli (CHN)	1:27.56	GR
2nd place, silver medalist(s)	Han Chun-ok (PRK)	1:27.96	
3rd place, bronze medalist(s)	Shoko Fusano (JPN)	1:30.07	
4	Akemi Tanaka (JPN)	1:30.84	
5	Zhang Qing (CHN)	1:30.97	
6	Chizuko Horata (JPN)	1:31.30	
7	Pak Gum-hyon (PRK)	1:31.57	
7	Ye Qiaobo (CHN)	1:31.57	
9	Choi Seung-youn (KOR)	1:34.14	
10	Wang Xiaoyan (CHN)	1:35.63	
