= Kuniomi Haneishi =

Japanese speed skater (born 1975)

Personal information
- Nationality: Japanese
- Born: 6 January 1975 (age 50); Tochigi, Japan

Sport
- Sport: Speed skating

Kuniomi Haneishi (羽石 国臣, Haneishi Kuniomi, born 6 January 1975) is a Japanese speed skater. He competed in the men's 500 metres event at the 2002 Winter Olympics.
