= Lee Yong-ju (speed skater) =

South Korean speed skater

Personal information
- Nationality: South Korean
- Born: 4 April 1980 (age 46)

Sport
- Sport: Speed skating

Lee Yong-ju (born 4 April 1980) is a South Korean speed skater. She competed in two events at the 2002 Winter Olympics.
