= Kenzhesh Sarsekenova-Orynbayeva =

Kazakhstani speed skater

Personal information
- Nationality: Kazakhstani
- Born: 17 October 1972 (age 52)

Sport
- Sport: Speed skating

Kenzhesh Sarsekenova-Orynbayeva (born 17 October 1972) is a Kazakhstani speed skater. She competed at the 1994 Winter Olympics and the 1998 Winter Olympics.
