= Song Yong-hun =

North Korean speed skater

Personal information
- Nationality: North Korean
- Born: 13 January 1972 (age 53)

Sport
- Sport: Speed skating

Song Yong-hun (born 13 January 1972, Korean: 송용훈) is a North Korean speed skater. He competed in two events at the 1988 Winter Olympics.
