= Yang Xu (speed skater) =

Chinese speed skater

Personal information
- Born: 26 April 1977 (age 49)

Sport
- Country: China
- Sport: Speed skating

Xu Yang or Yang Xu (born 26 April 1977) is a Chinese former long track speed skater, who was active between 1991 and 2002.

Xu represented her nation at international competitions. As a junior she participated at the 1995 World Junior Speed Skating Championships. At elite level she competed at the 1996 Asian Winter Games and 1997 Asian Speed Skating Championships. She won at the 2001 Asian Speed Skating Championships the bronze medal in the 1500 metres event and also the bronze medal in the 3000 metres event. Yang also medalled at the 1997 Winter Universiade with one silver and 2 bronze medals. She finished fourth at the 2001 Chinese Single Distance Championships in the 3000 metres event.

== Personal records ==
Distance	Result	Date	Location
500 m	40.71	7 October 2000	Olympic Oval, Calgary
1000 m	1:22.67	28 October 2000	Heilongjiang Indoor Rink, Harbin
1500 m	2:05.64	22 September 2001	Heilongjiang Indoor Rink, Harbin
3000 m	4:17.46	7 October 2000	Olympic Oval, Calgary
5000 m	7:41.51	19 October 2001	Heilongjiang Indoor Rink, Harbin
