= Vadim Shakshakbayev =

Kazakhstani speed skater

Personal information
- Native name: Вадим Шамильевич Шакшакбаев
- Full name: Vadim Shamilyevich Shakshakbayev
- Born: 9 October 1971 (age 54) Petropavl, Kazakh SSR, Soviet Union

Sport
- Country: Soviet Union; CIS; Kazakhstan
- Sport: Speed skating
Medal record
Men's speed skating
Representing Kazakhstan
Asian Games
Bronze medal – third place	1996 Harbin	1000 m

Vadim Shamilyevich Shakshakbayev (Russian: Вадим Шамильевич Шакшакбаев; born 9 October 1971) is a former speed skater who represented the Soviet Union, the Commonwealth of Independent States, and Kazakhstan, in that order. Shakshakbayev born in Petropavl, where he started his sporting career at the Dynamo Petropavl club. After the 1997–98 season, Shakshakbayev ended his speed skating career. He was a vice-president of Kazakhstan Engineering group until 2012. He also served as the president of the Barys Astana of the Kontinental Hockey League in 2012–13 KHL season.

== Personal records ==
Distance	Time	Location	Arena	Date
500 m	36.01	(Canada) Calgary	Olympic Oval	1996
1000 m	1:13.10	(Canada) Calgary	Olympic Oval	1996
1500 m	1:59.45	(Canada) Calgary	Olympic Oval	1996
3000 m	4:32.99	(Kazakhstan) Almaty	Medeu	1996
5000 m	7:51.20	(Kazakhstan) Almaty	Medeu	1987
