= Munehisa Kuroiwa =

Japanese speed skater (born 1966)

Personal information
- Nationality: Japanese
- Born: 19 April 1966 (age 60) Tsumagoi, Japan

Sport
- Country: Japan
- Sport: Speed skating
Medal record
Asian Winter Games
Gold medal – first place	1986 Sapporo	10,000 m
Silver medal – second place	1986 Sapporo	1500 m
Bronze medal – third place	1986 Sapporo	5000 m

Munehisa Kuroiwa (黒岩 宗久, Kuroiwa Munehisa; born 19 April 1966) is a Japanese speed skater. He competed in two events at the 1988 Winter Olympics.
