= Ra Yoon-soo =

South Korean speed skater

Personal information
- Nationality: South Korean
- Born: 20 August 1962 (age 63) Seoul, South Korea

Sport
- Country: South Korea
- Sport: Speed skating
Medal record
Asian Winter Games
Silver medal – second place	1986 Sapporo	500 m

Ra Yoon-soo (Korean: 나윤수; Hanja: 羅潤洙; RR: Na Yunsu, born 20 August 1962) is a South Korean speed skater. He competed at the 1980 Winter Olympics and the 1984 Winter Olympics.
