= Yukihiro Mitani =

Japanese speed skater (born 1966)

Personal information
- Nationality: Japanese
- Born: 22 April 1966 (age 60) Hokkaido, Japan

Sport
- Country: Japan
- Sport: Speed skating
Medal record
World Sprint Championships
Bronze medal – third place	1987 Sainte Foy	Sprint
Asian Winter Games
Gold medal – first place	1986 Sapporo	1500 m

Yukihiro Mitani (born 22 April 1966) is a Japanese speed skater. He competed in the men's 1000 metres event at the 1988 Winter Olympics.
