= Lü Shuhai =

Chinese speed skater

Personal information
- Nationality: Chinese
- Born: 20 July 1966 (age 59)

Sport
- Country: China
- Sport: Speed skating
Medal record
Asian Winter Games
Bronze medal – third place	1986 Sapporo	10,000 m

Lü Shuhai (Chinese: 吕树海, born 20 July 1966) is a Chinese speed skater. He competed in the men's 10,000 metres event at the 1988 Winter Olympics.
