= Dai Jun (speed skater) =

Chinese speed skater

Personal information
- Nationality: Chinese
- Born: 29 March 1966 (age 58)

Sport
- Sport: Speed skating

Dai Jun (born 29 March 1966) is a Chinese speed skater. He competed in two events at the 1992 Winter Olympics.
