= Lee Kyung-nam =

South Korean speed skater

Personal information
- Nationality: South Korean
- Born: 22 November 1980 (age 44)

Sport
- Sport: Speed skating

Lee Kyung-nam (born 22 November 1980) is a South Korean speed skater. She competed in two events at the 1998 Winter Olympics.
