= Hwang Ik-hwan =

South Korean speed skater

Personal information
- Nationality: South Korean
- Born: 19 May 1965 (age 61)

Sport
- Country: South Korea
- Sport: Speed skating
Medal record
Asian Winter Games
Bronze medal – third place	1986 Sapporo	1500 m

Hwang Ik-hwan (born 19 May 1965) is a South Korean speed skater. He competed in two events at the 1988 Winter Olympics.
