= Oh Yong-seok =

South Korean speed skater (born 1969)

Personal information
- Nationality: South Korean
- Born: 4 November 1969 (age 55)

Sport
- Sport: Speed skating

Oh Yong-seok (born 4 November 1969) is a South Korean speed skater. He competed in two events at the 1992 Winter Olympics.
