= Lee In-hoon =

South Korean speed skater

Personal information
- Nationality: South Korean
- Born: 30 July 1970 (age 54); Seoul, South Korea

Sport
- Sport: Speed skating

Lee In-hoon (born 30 July 1970) is a South Korean speed skater. He competed in two events at the 1992 Winter Olympics.
