= Nikolay Ulyanin =

Kazakhstani speed skater

Personal information
- Nationality: Kazakhstani
- Born: 26 December 1977 (age 48) Kostanay, Kazakhstan

Sport
- Sport: Speed skating

Nikolay Ulyanin (Николай Александрович Ульянин, born 26 December 1977) is a Kazakhstani speed skater. He competed in the men's 1500 metres event at the 2002 Winter Olympics.
