= Han Chun-ok =

North Korean speed skater (born 1965)

Personal information
- Born: 7 December 1965 (age 60) Hamhung, North Korea

Sport
- Country: North Korea
- Sport: Speed skating
Medal record
Asian Winter Games
Silver medal – second place	1986 Sapporo	1000 m
Bronze medal – third place	1986 Sapporo	3000 m

Han Chun-ok (born 7 December 1965) is a former North Korean female speed skater. She competed at the 1984 Winter Olympics and the 1988 Winter Olympics, representing North Korea.
