= Akira Kuroiwa =

Japanese speed skater (born 1961)

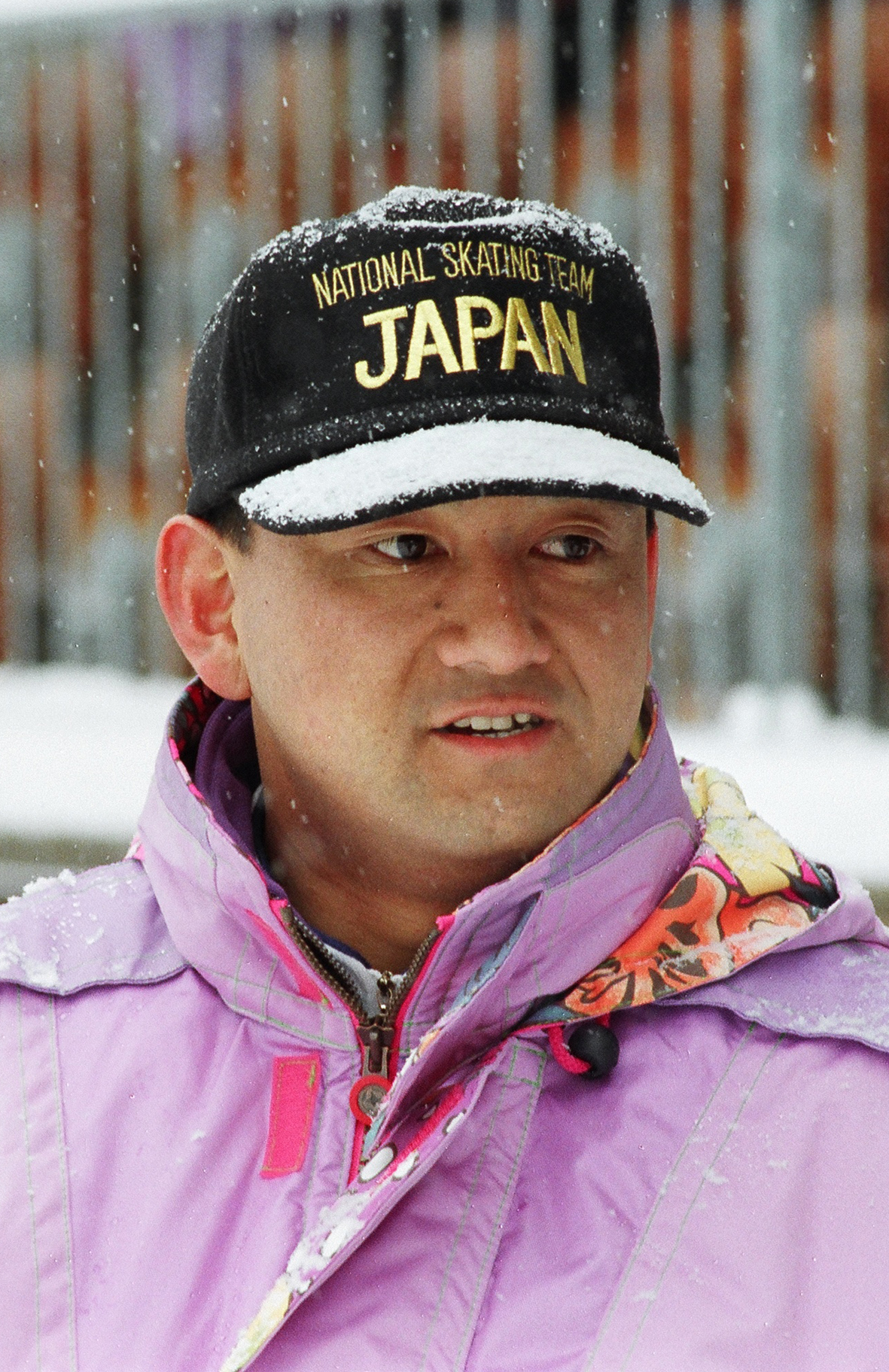

Personal information
- Born: 6 September 1961 (age 65) Tsumagoi, Gunma, Japan

Sport
- Country: Japan
- Sport: Speed skating
Medal record
Men's speed skating
Representing Japan
Olympic Games
Bronze medal – third place	1988 Calgary	500 metres
World Sprint Championships
Gold medal – first place	1983 Helsinki	Sprint
Gold medal – first place	1987 Sainte Foy	Sprint
Bronze medal – third place	1986 Karuizawa	Sprint
Asian Games
Gold medal – first place	1986 Sapporo	500 metres
Bronze medal – third place	1986 Sapporo	1000 metres

Akira Kuroiwa (黒岩 彰, Kuroiwa Akira; born 6 September 1961) is a former speed skater from Japan, who represented his native country at two consecutive Winter Olympics, starting in 1984 in Sarajevo, Yugoslavia. In 1988, he won the bronze medal in the men's 500 metres, after having captured two world titles at the Sprints Championships (1983 and 1987). At the 1984 Winter Olympics, Kuroiwa finished 10th in the men's 500 m.

Kuroiwa, who was born in Tsumagoi, Gunma, was a coach for the Japanese team during the 1998 Winter Olympics.

In Japan, Kuroiwa made headlines in 2000 when he tried to shield Daisuke Matsuzaka from an illegal driving charge by taking the blame for himself.
