= Sergey Ilyushchenko =

Kazakhstani speed skater (born 1980)

Personal information
- Nationality: Kazakhstani
- Born: 31 January 1980 (age 46) Almaty, Kazakhstan

Sport
- Sport: Speed skating

Sergey Ilyushchenko (Сергей Владимирович Илющенко, born 31 January 1980) is a Kazakhstani speed skater. He competed in the men's 5000 metres event at the 2002 Winter Olympics.
