= Vladimir Klepinin =

Kazakhstani speed skater (born 1971)

Personal information
- Nationality: Kazakhstani
- Born: 2 August 1971 (age 54)

Sport
- Sport: Speed skating

Vladimir Klepinin (Владимир Иванович Клепинин, born 2 August 1971) is a Kazakhstani speed skater. He competed at the 1994 Winter Olympics and the 1998 Winter Olympics.
