= Hozumi Moriyama =

Japanese speed skater (born 1967)

Personal information
- Nationality: Japanese
- Born: 5 November 1967 (age 57); Hokkaido, Japan

Sport
- Sport: Speed skating

Hozumi Moriyama (born 5 November 1967) is a Japanese speed skater. He competed in the men's 1500 metres event at the 1988 Winter Olympics.
