= Toyoki Takeda =

Japanese speed skater (born 1974)

Personal information
- Nationality: Japanese
- Born: 9 January 1974 (age 52) Shari, Hokkaido, Japan

Sport
- Sport: Speed skating

Toyoki Takeda (武田 豊樹, Takeda Toyoki; born 9 January 1974) is a Japanese speed skater. He competed in two events at the 2002 Winter Olympics.
