= Lyudmila Prokasheva =

Kazakhstani speed skater (born 1969)

Personal information
- Full name: Lyudmila Vyacheslavovna Prokasheva
- Born: 23 January 1969 (age 57) Pavlodar, Kazakh SSR, Soviet Union
- Height: 160 cm (5 ft 3 in)
- Weight: 56 kg (123 lb)

Sport
- Club: Dynamo Pavlodar
Medal record
Women's speed skating
Representing Kazakhstan
Olympic Games
Bronze medal – third place	1998 Nagano	5000 m
Asian Winter Games
Gold medal – first place	1996 Harbin	1500 m
Gold medal – first place	1996 Harbin	3000 m

Lyudmila Vyacheslavovna Prokasheva (Russian: Людмила Вячеславовна Прокашёва, born 23 January 1969 in Pavlodar, Kazakh SSR) is a former speed skater. Representing Kazakhstan, she won an Olympic bronze medal in the 1998 5000 metres. In 1995, she won a silver medal in the World Allround Speed Skating Championships for Women.
