= Bae Ki-tae =

South Korean speed skater (born 1965)

Personal information
- Born: 3 May 1965 (age 61) Uijeongbu, Gyeonggi-do

Sport
- Sport: Speed skating
Medal record
Men's speed skating
Representing South Korea
World Sprint Championships
Gold medal – first place	1990 Tromsø	Sprint
Asian Winter Games
Gold medal – first place	1986 Sapporo	1000 m
Gold medal – first place	1990 Sapporo	1000 m
Gold medal – first place	1990 Sapporo	1500 m
Silver medal – second place	1990 Sapporo	500 m
Bronze medal – third place	1986 Sapporo	500 m

Bae Ki-tae (Korean: 배기태; Hanja: 裴基兌, born 3 May 1965 in Uijeongbu, Gyeonggi-do) is a former speed skater from South Korea. In 1990, he became the first Korean speed-skater to win a senior championship, winning gold at the World Sprint Speed Skating Championships held in Tromsø, Norway. In addition, Kim participated in the World Allround Speed Skating Championships and won the 500 metres 3 times (1987, 1988 and 1990).
