= Song Hwa-son =

North Korean speed skater

Personal information
- Nationality: North Korean
- Born: 26 February 1968 (age 57)

Sport
- Sport: Speed skating

Song Hwa-son (born 26 February 1968, Korean: 송화선) is a North Korean speed skater. She competed at the 1988 Winter Olympics and the 1992 Winter Olympics.
