= Vladimir Kostin (speed skater) =

Kazakhstani speed skater

Personal information
- Nationality: Kazakhstani
- Born: 21 January 1976 (age 50) Kyzylorda, Kazakhstan

Sport
- Sport: Speed skating

Vladimir Kostin (Владимир Валерьевич Костин, born 21 January 1976) is a Kazakhstani speed skater. He competed in two events at the 2002 Winter Olympics.
