= Wang Xiuli =

Chinese speed skater

Personal information
- Nationality: Chinese
- Born: 25 October 1965 (age 60) Harbin, China

Sport
- Country: China
- Sport: Speed skating
Medal record
Asian Winter Games
| Gold medal – first place | 1986 Sapporo | 1000 m |
| Silver medal – second place | 1986 Sapporo | 1500 m |

Wang Xiuli (born 25 October 1965) is a Chinese speed skater. She competed at the 1984 Winter Olympics and the 1992 Winter Olympics.
