= Aki Tonoike =

Japanese speed skater (born 1979)

Personal information
- Nationality: Japanese
- Born: 3 March 1979 (age 46); Tatsuno, Hokkaido, Japan

Sport
- Sport: Speed skating

Aki Tonoike (外ノ池 亜希, Tonoike Aki, born 3 March 1979) is a Japanese speed skater. She competed at the 1998, 2002 and the 2006 Winter Olympics.
