= Yevgeny Sanarov =

Kazakhstani speed skater (born 1971)

Personal information
- Native name: Евгений Леонидович Санаров
- Full name: Yevgeny Leonidovich Sanarov
- Nationality: Kazakhstani
- Born: 2 September 1971 (age 53)
- Height: 185 cm (6 ft 1 in)
- Weight: 77 kg (170 lb)

Sport
- Country: CIS; Kazakhstan
- Sport: Speed skating

Yevgeny Leonidovich Sanarov (Russian: Евгениӥ Леонидович Санаров; born 2 September 1971) is a Kazakhstani former speed skater. He competed at the 1992 Winter Olympics and the 1994 Winter Olympics.
