= Liu Guangbin =

Chinese speed skater

Personal information
- Nationality: Chinese
- Born: 3 November 1979 (age 45)

Sport
- Sport: Speed skating

Liu Guangbin (born 3 November 1979) is a Chinese speed skater. He competed in the men's 1500 metres event at the 2002 Winter Olympics.
