= Yasushi Kuroiwa =

Japanese speed skater (born 1965)

Personal information
- Nationality: Japanese
- Born: 27 September 1965 (age 59); Tsumagoi, Japan

Sport
- Sport: Speed skating

Yasushi Kuroiwa (born 27 September 1965) is a Japanese speed skater. He competed in the men's 500 metres event at the 1988 Winter Olympics.
