= Jin Hua (speed skater) =

Chinese speed skater

Personal information
- Nationality: Chinese
- Born: 9 March 1972 (age 54) Jilin, China

Sport
- Sport: Speed skating

Jin Hua (born 9 March 1972) is a Chinese speed skater. She competed at the 1994, 1998 and the 2002 Winter Olympics.
