= Chun Joo-hyun =

South Korean speed skater (born 1977)

Personal information
- Nationality: South Korean
- Born: 28 February 1977 (age 48)

Sport
- Sport: Speed skating

Chun Joo-hyun (born 28 February 1977) is a South Korean speed skater. He competed in two events at the 1998 Winter Olympics.
