= Liu Yanfei =

Chinese speed skater

Personal information
- Nationality: Chinese
- Born: 15 February 1967 (age 58)

Sport
- Sport: Speed skating

Liu Yanfei (born 15 February 1967) is a Chinese speed skater. He competed at the 1988 Winter Olympics, the 1992 Winter Olympics and the 1994 Winter Olympics.
