= Toshihiko Itokawa =

Japanese speed skater (born 1974)

Personal information
- Nationality: Japanese
- Born: 20 September 1974 (age 52) Hokkaido, Japan

Sport
- Sport: Speed skating

Toshihiko Itokawa (糸川 敏彦, Itokawa Toshihiko; born 20 September 1974) is a Japanese speed skater. He competed at the 1992 Winter Olympics, the 1994 Winter Olympics and the 2002 Winter Olympics.
