= Yusuke Imai =

Japanese speed skater (born 1977)

Personal information
- Nationality: Japanese
- Born: 20 September 1977 (age 47); Usuda, Japan

Sport
- Sport: Speed skating

Yusuke Imai (born 20 September 1977) is a Japanese speed skater. He competed at the 1998 Winter Olympics, the 2002 Winter Olympics and the 2006 Winter Olympics.
