= Kim Yoon-man =

South Korean speed skater

Personal information
- Born: 25 February 1973 (age 53) South Korea

Korean name
- Hangul: 김윤만
- Hanja: 金潤萬
- RR: Gim Yunman
- MR: Kim Yunman

Sport
- Sport: Speed skating
Medal record
Men's speed skating
Representing South Korea
Olympic Games
Silver medal – second place	1992 Albertville	1000 m
World Sprint Championships
Gold medal – first place	1995 Milwaukee	Sprint
Asian Winter Games
Bronze medal – third place	1996 Harbin	500 m
Silver medal – second place	1996 Harbin	1000 m

Kim Yoon-man (born 25 February 1973) is a former speed skater from South Korea. At the 1992 Winter Olympics, he won a silver medal in the 1000 m. He was the first South Korean person to win a medal at the Winter Olympic Games.

== Education ==
- Korea University
- Uijeongbu High School
