= Chun Hee-joo =

South Korean speed skater (born 1975)

Personal information
- Nationality: South Korean
- Born: 5 October 1975 (age 49); Gyeongsangbuk, South Korea

Sport
- Sport: Speed skating

Chun Hee-joo (born 5 October 1975) is a South Korean speed skater. She competed at the 1994 Winter Olympics and the 1998 Winter Olympics.
