= Xue Ruihong =

Chinese speed skater

Personal information
- Nationality: Chinese
- Born: 4 April 1968 (age 56); Qiqihar, Heilongjiang, China

Sport
- Sport: Speed skating

Xue Ruihong (born 4 April 1968) is a Chinese speed skater. She competed at the 1992, 1994 and the 1998 Winter Olympics.
