= Im Ri-bin =

North Korean speed skater (born 1968)

Personal information
- Nationality: North Korean
- Born: 6 October 1968 (age 57)

Sport
- Country: North Korea
- Sport: Speed skating
Medal record
Asian Winter Games
Silver medal – second place	1986 Sapporo	5000 m

Im Ri-bin (Korean: 임리빈, born 6 October 1968) is a North Korean speed skater. He competed at the 1984 Winter Olympics and the 1988 Winter Olympics.
