= Jaegal Sung-yeol =

South Korean speed skater

Personal information
- Born: 24 March 1970 (age 56) Uijeongbu, Gyeonggi Province, South Korea
Medal record
Men's speed skating
Representing South Korea
World Championships
Bronze medal – third place	1996 Hamar	1000 m
Asian Winter Games
Gold medal – first place	1996 Harbin	500 m
Silver medal – second place	1999 Chuncheon	500 m

Jaegal Sung-yeol (Korean: 제갈성렬; Hanja: 諸葛成烈; born 24 March 1970 in Uijeongbu, Gyeonggi Province) is a former speed skater from South Korea. At the 1992 Winter Olympics, he finished 12th in the 500 m long track speed skating.
