= Choi Jae-bong =

South Korean speed skater (born 1980)

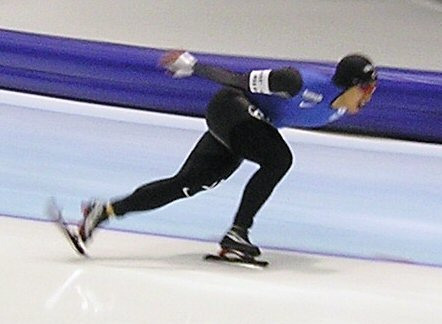
- Choi Jae-bong at a 2006 World Cup in Thialf (Heerenveen, Netherlands)

Personal information
- Born: 19 June 1980 (age 46) South Korea
- Height: 1.76 m (5 ft 9 in)
- Weight: 78 kg (172 lb; 12.3 st)

Sport
- Country: South Korea
- Sport: Speed skating
Medal record
Men's speed skating
Representing South Korea
World Junior Championships
Bronze medal – third place	1999 Geithus	All Around
Asian Winter Games
Gold medal – first place	1999 Gangwon	1000 m
Gold medal – first place	1999 Gangwon	1500 m
Bronze medal – third place	2007 Changchun	1000 m

Choi Jae-bong (Korean: 최재봉; Hanja: 崔財鳳; born 19 June 1980) is a South Korean speed skater. He represented his country at the 1998 Winter Olympics in Nagano. At that time he was the holder of the junior World record at 1500 m, set in early December 1997 in Thialf, Heerenveen, where he clocked 1:52.25 to break the record. In Nagano where he finished in 12th position he broke his own world junior record to a new best time of 1:51.47, which was 0.78 of a second faster. He also finished in 29th position at the 5000 m. In November 1998 he broke the junior world record over 500 m into a new time of 36.30 in Calgary and a day later he broke his own 1500 m record again, this time 1:49.71 was his new best time. Due to these records and some other decent results in that same weekend he also broke the junior world record for the small allround classification to 153.689 points. That same season he won the bronze medal at the World Junior Allround Championships and broke another two world records. He set 1:10.87 at the 1000 m in February 1999 and a total of 143.965 points for the sprint classification again in Calgary.

As a senior, during his second Olympic Games, the 2002 Winter Olympics in Salt Lake City he finished 17th at the 500 m, 12th at the 1000 m and 21st at the 1500 m. He also represented South Korea four years later during the 2006 Winter Olympics in Turin. In Italy he finished in his all-time best Olympic result, by becoming 8th at the 500 m. He also became 17th at the 1000 m.

== Personal records ==
- 500 m – 35.12, 12 February 2002, Salt Lake City
- 1000 m – 1:08.81, 16 February 2002, Salt Lake City
- 1500 m – 1:47.26, 19 February 2002, Salt Lake City
- 3000 m – 3:55.29, 15 November 1997, Calgary
- 5000 m – 6:49.61, 7 December 1997, Heerenveen
- 10000 m – 15:11.81, 23 February 1996, Seoul

== Personal life ==
Choi graduated from Hyowon High School in Suwon, South Korea.
