= South Korea at the 1996 Asian Winter Games =

- IOC code: KOR
- NOC: Korean Olympic Committee

in Harbin
- Competitors: 63
- Medals Ranked 4th: Gold 8 Silver 10 Bronze 8 Total 26

Asian Winter Games appearances (overview)
- 1986; 1990; 1996; 1999; 2003; 2007; 2011; 2017; 2025; 2029

South Korea (IOC designation:Korea) participated in the 1996 Asian Winter Games held in Harbin, China PR from February 4, 1996, to February 11, 1996.

== Medal summary ==
=== Medal table ===
Sport	Gold	Silver	Bronze	Total
Short track speed skating	5	8	5	18
Speed skating	2	1	1	4
Alpine skiing	1	1	1	3
Cross-country skiing	0	0	1	1
Totals (4 entries)	8	10	8	26

=== Medalists ===
==== Gold ====
Alpine skiing

- Men's Super Giant Slalom - Byun Jong-moon

Short track speed skating

- Men's 1000 m - Chae Ji-hoon
- Men's 3000 m - Chae Ji-hoon
- Men's 5000 m Relay - Chae Ji-hoon, Lee Jun-hwan, Kim Dong-sung, Kim Seon-tae
- Women's 1000 m - Chun Lee-kyung
- Women's 3000 m - Kim Yoon-mi

Speed skating

- Men's 500 m - Jaegal Sung-yeol
- Women's 1000 m - Chun Hee-joo

==== Silver ====
Alpine skiing

- Men's Giant Slalom - Hur Seung-Wook

Short track speed skating

- Men's 500 m - Kim Dong-sung
- Men's 1000 m - Song Jae-kun
- Men's 1500 m - Chae Ji-hoon
- Men's 3000 m - Kim Dong-sung
- Women's 1000 m - Won Hye-kyung
- Women's 1500 m - Chun Lee-kyung
- Women's 3000 m - Won Hye-kyung
- Women's 3000 m Relay - Kim Yoon-mi, Won Hye-kyung, Kim So-hee, An Sang-mi

Speed skating

- Men's 1000 m - Kim Yoon-man

==== Bronze ====
Alpine skiing

- Men's Giant Slalom - Byun Jong-moon

Cross-country skiing

- Men's 10 km (Classical) - Park Byung-chul

Short track speed skating

- Men's 1000 m - Kim Dong-sung
- Men's 1500 m - Lee Jun-hwan
- Men's 3000 m - Song Jae-kun
- Women's 1500 m - Kim Yoon-mi
- Women's 3000 m - Chun Lee-kyung

Speed skating

- Men's 500 m - Kim Yoon-man
