= Radik Bikchentayev =

Kazakhstani speed skater (born 1972)

Personal information
- Nationality: Kazakhstani
- Born: 2 August 1972 (age 52); Temirtau, Kazakh SSR, Soviet Union

Sport
- Sport: Speed skating

Radik Bikchentayev (born 2 August 1972) is a Kazakhstani speed skater. He competed at the 1994 Winter Olympics, the 1998 Winter Olympics and the 2002 Winter Olympics.

== Achievements ==
1994 Winter Olympics speed skating 5000 meters, Men - rank 16
