= Liu Hongbo =

Chinese speed skater

Personal information
- Nationality: Chinese
- Born: 7 November 1973 (age 51)

Sport
- Sport: Speed skating

Liu Hongbo (born 7 November 1973) is a Chinese speed skater. He competed at the 1992 Winter Olympics, the 1994 Winter Olympics and the 1998 Winter Olympics.
