= China at the 1986 Asian Winter Games =

- IOC code: CHN
- NOC: Chinese Olympic Committee external link (in Chinese and English)

in Sapporo
- Medals Ranked 2nd: Gold 4 Silver 5 Bronze 12 Total 21

Asian Winter Games appearances
- 1986; 1990; 1996; 1999; 2003; 2007; 2011; 2017; 2025; 2029

China competed in the 1986 Asian Winter Games which were held in Sapporo, Japan from March 1, 1986 to March 8, 1986. It won 4 gold, 5 silver and 12 bronze medals.

== See also ==
- China at the Asian Games
- China at the Olympics
- Sports in China
