= China at the 1996 Asian Winter Games =

- IOC code: CHN
- NOC: Chinese Olympic Committee external link (in Chinese and English)

in Harbin
- Medals Ranked 1st: Gold 15 Silver 7 Bronze 15 Total 37

Asian Winter Games appearances
- 1986; 1990; 1996; 1999; 2003; 2007; 2011; 2017; 2025; 2029

China competed in the 1996 Asian Winter Games which were held in Harbin, China from February 4, 1996 to February 11, 1996. It won 15 gold, 7 silver and 15 bronze medals.

== See also ==
- China at the Asian Games
- China at the Olympics
- Sports in China
