= 1996 Asian Winter Games =

Multi-sport event in Harbin, China

III Asian Winter Games
- Host city: Harbin, Heilongjiang, China
- Nations: 15
- Athletes: 453
- Events: 43 in 8 sports
- Opening: 4 February 1996
- Closing: 11 February 1996
- Opened by: Jiang Zemin; President of China (Note: OCA states Jiang Zemin opened the Games as "President", de jure head of state. Though Jiang Zemin was also de facto ruler as General Secretary of the Chinese Communist Party, that title is not reflected in OCA records.)
- Torch lighter: Wang Xiuli
- Main venue: Baqu Arena

Summer

Winter

The 3rd Asian Winter Games (Chinese: 第三届亚洲冬季运动会; pinyin: Dì sān jiè yàzhōu dōngjì yùndònghuì), also known as Harbin 1996 (Chinese: 哈尔滨1996), were held from February 4 to 11, 1996 in Harbin, Heilongjiang, China. North Korea's Samjiyon was the original host for the games scheduled in 1995, but withdrew in August 1992. After the withdrawal, South Korea and then China submitted bids respectively. The Olympic Council of Asia (OCA) decided to elect the host cities for these 3rd games and the next 4th games simultaneously. On December 2, 1993, The OCA announced that the 3rd games would be held in China in 1996 and the 4th games would be held in South Korea in 1999.

== Mascot ==
Doudou, official mascot of the 1996 Asian Winter Games

The 1996 Winter Asiad mascot is Doudou, a character inspired by the pea plant.

== Sports ==
A total of 43 events in eight medal sports were held in the Third Winter Asian Games. Figure skating was reinstated and Freestyle skiing was added to the program.

- Alpine skiing (4)
- Biathlon (6)
- Cross-country skiing (6)
- Figure skating (4)
- Freestyle skiing (2)
- Ice hockey (2)
- Short-track speed skating (10)
- Speed skating (9)

Demonstration sport only:

- Ski jumping (2) ()

== Participating nations ==
Names are arranged in alphabetical order.

- China (280)
- Chinese Taipei
- Hong Kong
- India (9)
- Iran (6)
- Japan
- Kazakhstan
- Kuwait (1)
- Kyrgyzstan (3)
- Lebanon (6)
- Mongolia
- Pakistan (4)
- South Korea (127)
- Tajikistan (3)
- Uzbekistan

Non-competing nations

- Macau
- Thailand

== Medal table ==
* Host nation (China)

Rank	Nation	Gold	Silver	Bronze	Total
1	China*	15	7	15	37
2	Kazakhstan	14	9	8	31
3	Japan	8	14	10	32
4	South Korea	8	10	8	26
5	Uzbekistan	0	1	1	2
Totals (5 entries)		45	41	42	128

== Notes ==
Preceded by Sapporo	Asian Winter Games; Harbin; III Asian Winter Games (1996)	Succeeded by Kangwon
