= List of Asian Games medalists in biathlon =

This is the complete list of Asian Winter Games medalists in biathlon from 1986 to 2025.

== Men ==
=== 10 km sprint ===
Games	Gold	Silver	Bronze
1986 Sapporo	Koichi Sato (JPN)	Liu Hongwang (CHN)	Isao Yamase (JPN)
1990 Sapporo	Wang Weiyi (CHN)	Misao Kodate (JPN)	Atsushi Kazama (JPN)
1996 Harbin	Dmitriy Pantov (KAZ)	Valeriy Ivanov (KAZ)	Tan Hongbin (CHN)
1999 Gangwon	Zhang Qing (CHN)	Dmitriy Pozdnyakov (KAZ)	Dmitriy Pantov (KAZ)
2003 Aomori	Hironao Meguro (JPN)	Sunao Noto (JPN)	Tatsumi Kasahara (JPN)
2007 Changchun	Hidenori Isa (JPN)	Zhang Chengye (CHN)	Zhang Qing (CHN)
2011 Astana–Almaty	Alexandr Chervyakov (KAZ)	Ren Long (CHN)	Junji Nagai (JPN)
2017 Sapporo	Yan Savitskiy (KAZ)	Vassiliy Podkorytov (KAZ)	Mikito Tachizaki (JPN)
2025 Harbin	Vladislav Kireyev (KAZ)	Vadim Kurales (KAZ)	Gu Cang (CHN)

=== 12.5 km pursuit ===
Games	Gold	Silver	Bronze
2003 Aomori	Hironao Meguro (JPN)	Sunao Noto (JPN)	Kyoji Suga (JPN)
2011 Astana–Almaty	Alexandr Chervyakov (KAZ)	Junji Nagai (JPN)	Ren Long (CHN)
2017 Sapporo	Mikito Tachizaki (JPN)	Yan Savitskiy (KAZ)	Kim Yong-gyu (KOR)

=== 15 km mass start ===
Games	Gold	Silver	Bronze
2017 Sapporo	Yan Savitskiy (KAZ)	Wang Wenqiang (CHN)	Kosuke Ozaki (JPN)

=== 20 km individual ===
Games	Gold	Silver	Bronze
1986 Sapporo	Isao Yamase (JPN)	Koichi Sato (JPN)	Liu Hongwang (CHN)
1990 Sapporo	Song Wenbin (CHN)	Akihiro Takizawa (JPN)	Wang Weiyi (CHN)
1996 Harbin	Valeriy Ivanov (KAZ)	Mikhail Lepeshkin (KAZ)	Dmitriy Pantov (KAZ)
1999 Gangwon	Zhang Qing (CHN)	Dmitriy Pozdnyakov (KAZ)	Dmitriy Pantov (KAZ)
2007 Changchun	Alexandr Chervyakov (KAZ)	Zhang Qing (CHN)	Hidenori Isa (JPN)
2011 Astana–Almaty	Junji Nagai (JPN)	Ren Long (CHN)	Li Zhonghai (CHN)

=== 4 × 7.5 km relay ===
Games	Gold	Silver	Bronze
1986 Sapporo	Japan (JPN); Isao Yamase; Koichi Sato; Hirohide Sato; Tadashi Nakamura	China (CHN)	South Korea (KOR); Kang Tae-soo; Hong Byung-sik; Joung Young-suk; Hwang Byung-dae
1990 Sapporo	Japan (JPN)	China (CHN)	South Korea (KOR); Kim Yong-woon; Kim Sang-wook; Shin Young-sun; Kim Woon-ki
1996 Harbin	Kazakhstan (KAZ); Sergey Abdukarov; Valeriy Ivanov; Mikhail Lepeshkin; Dmitriy Pantov	Japan (JPN)	China (CHN); Lu Liang; Song Libin; Su Peishan; Tan Hongbin
1999 Gangwon	Kazakhstan (KAZ); Alexey Karevskiy; Sergey Abdukarov; Dmitriy Pantov; Dmitriy Pozdnyakov	Japan (JPN); Takashi Shindo; Shinji Ebisawa; Hideki Yamamoto; Hidenori Isa	South Korea (KOR); Son Hae-kwon; Shin Byung-kook; Choi Neung-chul; Jeon Jae-won
2003 Aomori	Japan (JPN); Sunao Noto; Hironao Meguro; Tatsumi Kasahara; Kyoji Suga	South Korea (KOR); Son Hae-kwon; Kim Kyung-tae; Shin Byung-kook; Park Yoon-bae	China (CHN); Qiu Lianhai; Zhang Hongjun; Zhang Qing; Wang Xin
2007 Changchun	China (CHN); Zhang Qing; Ren Long; Zhang Chengye; Tian Ye	Japan (JPN); Tatsumi Kasahara; Hidenori Isa; Yoshiyuki Asari; Shinya Saito	Kazakhstan (KAZ); Sergey Naumik; Alexandr Trifonov; Yerden Abdrakhmanov; Alexandr Chervyakov
2011 Astana–Almaty	Kazakhstan (KAZ); Alexandr Chervyakov; Nikolay Braichenko; Yan Savitskiy; Dias Keneshev	Japan (JPN); Junji Nagai; Hidenori Isa; Kazuya Inomata; Satoru Abo	China (CHN); Ren Long; Zhang Chengye; Chen Haibin; Li Zhonghai
2025 Harbin	Japan (JPN); Kiyomasa Ojima; Mikito Tachizaki; Masaharu Yamamoto; Tsukasa Kobonoki	Kazakhstan (KAZ); Alexandr Mukhin; Asset Dyussenov; Kirill Bauer; Vladislav Kireyev	China (CHN); Hu Weiyao; Wu Hantu; Yan Xingyuan; Gu Cang

== Women ==
=== 7.5 km sprint ===
Games	Gold	Silver	Bronze
1996 Harbin	Inna Sheshkil (KAZ)	Wang Jinfen (CHN)	Yu Shumei (CHN)
1999 Gangwon	Yu Shumei (CHN)	Margarita Dulova (KAZ)	Sun Ribo (CHN)
2003 Aomori	Tamami Tanaka (JPN)	Kong Yingchao (CHN)	Liu Xianying (CHN)
2007 Changchun	Liu Xianying (CHN)	Kong Yingchao (CHN)	Dong Xue (CHN)
2007 Changchun	Liu Xianying (CHN)	Kong Yingchao (CHN)	Tamami Tanaka (JPN)
2011 Astana–Almaty	Wang Chunli (CHN)	Yelena Khrustaleva (KAZ)	Marina Lebedeva (KAZ)
2017 Sapporo	Galina Vishnevskaya (KAZ)	Zhang Yan (CHN)	Alina Raikova (KAZ)
2025 Harbin	Ekaterina Avvakumova (KOR)	Meng Fanqi (CHN)	Tang Jialin (CHN)

=== 10 km pursuit ===
Games	Gold	Silver	Bronze
2003 Aomori	Kong Yingchao (CHN)	Liu Xianying (CHN)	Sun Ribo (CHN)
2007 Changchun	Kong Yingchao (CHN)	Liu Xianying (CHN)	Dong Xue (CHN)
2007 Changchun	Kong Yingchao (CHN)	Liu Xianying (CHN)	Yelena Khrustaleva (KAZ)
2017 Sapporo	Galina Vishnevskaya (KAZ)	Zhang Yan (CHN)	Darya Usanova (KAZ)

=== 12.5 km mass start ===
Games	Gold	Silver	Bronze
2017 Sapporo	Galina Vishnevskaya (KAZ)	Alina Raikova (KAZ)	Fuyuko Tachizaki (JPN)

=== 15 km individual ===
Games	Gold	Silver	Bronze
1996 Harbin	Inna Sheshkil (KAZ)	Margarita Dulova (KAZ)	Yu Shumei (CHN)
1999 Gangwon	Yu Shumei (CHN)	Liu Xianying (CHN)	Margarita Dulova (KAZ)
2007 Changchun	Liu Xianying (CHN)	Kong Yingchao (CHN)	Inna Mozhevitina (KAZ)
2011 Astana–Almaty	Yelena Khrustaleva (KAZ)	Fuyuko Suzuki (JPN)	Marina Lebedeva (KAZ)

=== 4 × 6 km relay ===
- 4 × 7.5 km relay: 1996–1999

Games	Gold	Silver	Bronze
1996 Harbin	China (CHN); Liu Jinfeng; Song Aiqin; Wang Jinfen; Yu Shumei	Kazakhstan (KAZ)	None awarded
1999 Gangwon	Kazakhstan (KAZ); Galina Avtayeva; Margarita Dulova; Yelena Dubok; Lyudmila Guryeva	China (CHN); Yu Shumei; Sun Ribo; Liu Xianying; Kong Yingchao	South Korea (KOR); Kim Ja-youn; Kim Mi-young; Yoo Jea-sun; Choi Mi-jung
2003 Aomori	China (CHN); Kong Yingchao; Liu Xianying; Sun Ribo; Yu Shumei	Japan (JPN); Sanae Takano; Tamami Tanaka; Ikuyo Tsukidate; Kanae Suzuki	Kazakhstan (KAZ); Yelena Dubok; Olga Dudchenko; Inna Mozhevitina; Viktoriya Afanasyeva
2007 Changchun	China (CHN); Kong Yingchao; Dong Xue; Yin Qiao; Liu Xianying	Kazakhstan (KAZ); Yelena Khrustaleva; Viktoriya Afanasyeva; Olga Dudchenko; Inna Mozhevitina	Japan (JPN); Megumi Izumi; Tamami Tanaka; Megumi Matsuura; Ikuyo Tsukidate
2011 Astana–Almaty	Kazakhstan (KAZ); Marina Lebedeva; Olga Poltoranina; Inna Mozhevitina; Yelena Khrustaleva	China (CHN); Wang Chunli; Tang Jialin; Xu Yinghui; Liu Yuanyuan	Japan (JPN); Fuyuko Suzuki; Itsuka Owada; Ayako Mukai; Natsuko Abe
2025 Harbin	China (CHN); Tang Jialin; Wen Ying; Chu Yuanmeng; Meng Fanqi	South Korea (KOR); Ko Eun-jung; Ekaterina Avvakumova; Mariya Abe; Jung Ju-mi	Kazakhstan (KAZ); Olga Poltoranina; Darya Klimina; Arina Kryukova; Yelizaveta Beletskaya

== Mixed ==
=== 2 × 6 km + 2 × 7.5 km relay ===
Games	Gold	Silver	Bronze
2017 Sapporo	Kazakhstan (KAZ); Galina Vishnevskaya; Darya Usanova; Maxim Braun; Yan Savitskiy	Kazakhstan (KAZ); Alina Raikova; Anna Kistanova; Vassiliy Podkorytov; Anton Pantov	Japan (JPN); Fuyuko Tachizaki; Yurie Tanaka; Mikito Tachizaki; Tsukasa Kobonoki
