= Biathlon at the Asian Winter Games =

- Governing bodies: IBU (World)
- Events: 4 (men: 2; women: 2)

Games
- 1986; 1990; 1996; 1999; 2003; 2007; 2011; 2017; 2025
- Medalists

Biathlon has been featured as a sport in the Asian Winter Games since the first winter games in 1986.

== Editions ==
Games	Year	Host city	Best nation
I	1986	Sapporo, Japan	Japan
II	1990	Sapporo, Japan	China
III	1996	Harbin, China	Kazakhstan
IV	1999	Gangwon, South Korea	China
V	2003	Aomori, Japan	Japan
VI	2007	Changchun, China	China
VII	2011	Astana–Almaty, Kazakhstan	Kazakhstan
VIII	2017	Sapporo, Japan	Kazakhstan
IX	2025	Harbin, China	Kazakhstan

== Events ==
Event	86	90	96	99	03	07	11	17	25	Years
Men's sprint	X	X	X	X	X	X	X	X	X	9
Men's pursuit					X		X	X		3
Men's mass start								X		1
Men's individual	X	X	X	X		X	X			6
Men's relay	X	X	X	X	X	X	X		X	8
Women's sprint			X	X	X	X	X	X	X	7
Women's pursuit					X	X		X		3
Women's mass start								X		1
Women's individual			X	X		X	X			4
Women's relay			X	X	X	X	X		X	6
Mixed relay								X		1
Total	3	3	6	6	6	7	7	7	4	

== Medal table ==
Rank	Nation	Gold	Silver	Bronze	Total
1	Kazakhstan (KAZ)	20	15	13	48
2	China (CHN)	16	20	19	55
3	Japan (JPN)	12	12	13	37
4	South Korea (KOR)	1	2	5	8
Totals (4 entries)		49	49	50	148
