= Biathlon at the 2003 Asian Winter Games =

- Venue: Iwakisan Sports Park
- Dates: 3–7 February 2003
- Competitors: 35 from 5 nations

Biathlon at the 2003 Asian Winter Games was held at the Iwakisan Sports Park in Iwaki, Japan from 3 February to 7 February 2003.

== Schedule ==
F	Final

Event↓/Date →	3rd Mon	4th Tue	5th Wed	6th Thu	7th Fri
Men's 10 km sprint	F				
Men's 12.5 km pursuit			F		
Men's 4 × 7.5 km relay					F
Women's 7.5 km sprint	F				
Women's 10 km pursuit			F		
Women's 4 × 6 km relay					F

== Medalists ==
=== Men ===
Event	Gold	Silver	Bronze
10 km sprint	Hironao Meguro; Japan	Sunao Noto; Japan	Tatsumi Kasahara; Japan
12.5 km pursuit	Hironao Meguro; Japan	Sunao Noto; Japan	Kyoji Suga; Japan
4 × 7.5 km relay	Japan; Sunao Noto; Hironao Meguro; Tatsumi Kasahara; Kyoji Suga	South Korea; Son Hae-kwon; Kim Kyung-tae; Shin Byung-kook; Park Yoon-bae	China; Qiu Lianhai; Zhang Hongjun; Zhang Qing; Wang Xin

=== Women ===
Event	Gold	Silver	Bronze
7.5 km sprint	Tamami Tanaka; Japan	Kong Yingchao; China	Liu Xianying; China
10 km pursuit	Kong Yingchao; China	Liu Xianying; China	Sun Ribo; China
4 × 6 km relay	China; Kong Yingchao; Liu Xianying; Sun Ribo; Yu Shumei	Japan; Sanae Takano; Tamami Tanaka; Ikuyo Tsukidate; Kanae Suzuki	Kazakhstan; Yelena Dubok; Olga Dudchenko; Inna Mozhevitina; Viktoriya Afanasyeva

== Medal table ==
Rank	Nation	Gold	Silver	Bronze	Total
1	Japan (JPN)	4	3	2	9
2	China (CHN)	2	2	3	7
3	South Korea (KOR)	0	1	0	1
4	Kazakhstan (KAZ)	0	0	1	1
Totals (4 entries)		6	6	6	18

== Participating nations ==
A total of 35 athletes from 5 nations competed in biathlon at the 2003 Asian Winter Games:

- China (9)
- Japan (8)
- Kazakhstan (8)
- Mongolia (1)
- South Korea (9)
