= Biathlon at the 1999 Asian Winter Games =

- Venue: Provincial Nordic Venue
- Dates: 1–5 February 1999
- Competitors: 34 from 5 nations

Biathlon at the 1999 Asian Winter Games took place in the Provincial Nordic venue, around the resort town of Yongpyong, Kangwon, South Korea with six events contested — three for men and three for women.

== Schedule ==
F	Final

Event↓/Date →	1st Mon	2nd Tue	3rd Wed	4th Thu	5th Fri
Men's 10 km sprint			F		
Men's 20 km individual	F				
Men's 4 × 7.5 km relay					F
Women's 7.5 km sprint			F		
Women's 15 km individual	F				
Women's 4 × 6 km relay					F

== Medalists ==
=== Men ===
Event	Gold	Silver	Bronze
10 km sprint	Zhang Qing; China	Dmitriy Pozdnyakov; Kazakhstan	Dmitriy Pantov; Kazakhstan
20 km individual	Zhang Qing; China	Dmitriy Pozdnyakov; Kazakhstan	Dmitriy Pantov; Kazakhstan
4 × 7.5 km relay	Kazakhstan; Alexey Karevskiy; Sergey Abdukarov; Dmitriy Pantov; Dmitriy Pozdnyakov	Japan; Takashi Shindo; Shinji Ebisawa; Hideki Yamamoto; Hidenori Isa	South Korea; Son Hae-kwon; Shin Byung-kook; Choi Neung-chul; Jeon Jae-won

=== Women ===
Event	Gold	Silver	Bronze
7.5 km sprint	Yu Shumei; China	Margarita Dulova; Kazakhstan	Sun Ribo; China
15 km individual	Yu Shumei; China	Liu Xianying; China	Margarita Dulova; Kazakhstan
4 × 7.5 km relay	Kazakhstan; Galina Avtayeva; Margarita Dulova; Yelena Dubok; Lyudmila Guryeva	China; Yu Shumei; Sun Ribo; Liu Xianying; Kong Yingchao	South Korea; Kim Ja-youn; Kim Mi-young; Yoo Jea-sun; Choi Mi-jung

== Medal table ==
Rank	Nation	Gold	Silver	Bronze	Total
1	China (CHN)	4	2	1	7
2	Kazakhstan (KAZ)	2	3	3	8
3	Japan (JPN)	0	1	0	1
4	South Korea (KOR)	0	0	2	2
Totals (4 entries)		6	6	6	18

== Participating nations ==
A total of 34 athletes from 5 nations competed in biathlon at the 1999 Asian Winter Games:

- China (8)
- Japan (7)
- Kazakhstan (9)
- Mongolia (1)
- South Korea (9)
