= Kazakhstan at the 1998 Winter Olympics =

- IOC code: KAZ
- NOC: National Olympic Committee of the Republic of Kazakhstan
- Website: www.olympic.kz (in Kazakh, Russian, and English)

in Nagano
- Competitors: 60 (45 men, 15 women) in 8 sports
- Flag bearer: Vladimir Smirnov (cross-country skiing)
- Medals Ranked 20th: Gold 0 Silver 0 Bronze 2 Total 2

Winter Olympics appearances (overview)
- 1994; 1998; 2002; 2006; 2010; 2014; 2018; 2022; 2026; 2030

Other related appearances
- Soviet Union (1956–1988); Unified Team (1992)

Kazakhstan competed at the 1998 Winter Olympics in Nagano, Japan.

== Medalists ==
Medal	Name	Sport	Event	Date
Bronze	Vladimir Smirnov	Cross-country skiing	Men's 15 kilometre freestyle pursuit	14 February
Bronze	Lyudmila Prokasheva	Speed skating	Women's 5000 metres	20 February

== Competitors ==
The following is the list of number of competitors in the Games.

Sport	Men	Women	Total
Alpine skiing	1	1	2
Biathlon	4	4	8
Cross-country skiing	5	5	10
Figure skating	3	2	5
Freestyle skiing	1	1	2
Ice hockey	22	0	22
Ski jumping	4	–	4
Speed skating	5	2	7
Total	45	15	60

== Alpine skiing ==
Men

Athlete	Event	Race 1	Race 2	Total	
Athlete	Event	Time	Time	Time	Rank
Dmitry Kvach	Giant Slalom	1:29.95	DNF	DNF	–

Women

Athlete	Event	Total	
Athlete	Event	Time	Rank
Yuliya Krygina	Super-G	DNF	–

== Biathlon ==
Men

Event	Athlete	Misses ^{1}	Time	Rank
10 km Sprint	Dmitry Pantov	3	30:51.8	54
10 km Sprint	Valery Ivanov	5	59:58.8	31
10 km Sprint	Dmitry Pozdnyakov	0	29:30.1	24

Event	Athlete	Time	Misses	Adjusted time ^{2}	Rank
20 km	Dmitry Pozdnyakov	59:22.9	6	1'05:22.9	59
20 km	Valery Ivanov	56:55.9	7	1'03:55.9	52
20 km	Dmitry Pantov	58:10.5	5	1'03:10.5	49

Men's 4 × 7.5 km relay

Athletes	Race		
Athletes	Misses ^{1}	Time	Rank
Dmitry Pantov; Dmitry Pozdnyakov; Aleksandr Menshchikov; Valery Ivanov	1	1'27:56.0	16

Women

Event	Athlete	Misses ^{1}	Time	Rank
7.5 km Sprint	Inna Sheshkil	1	24:32.9	20
7.5 km Sprint	Margarita Dulova	1	24:21.7	18

Event	Athlete	Time	Misses	Adjusted time ^{2}	Rank
15 km	Inna Sheshkil	56:27.7	7	1'03:27.7	54
15 km	Lyudmila Guryeva	54:42.8	4	58:42.8	23

Women's 4 × 7.5 km relay

Athletes	Race		
Athletes	Misses ^{1}	Time	Rank
Inna Sheshkil; Margarita Dulova; Yelena Dubok; Lyudmila Guryeva	2	1'45:22.9	11

^{1} A penalty loop of 150 metres had to be skied per missed target.
^{2} One minute added per missed target.

== Cross-country skiing ==
Men

Event	Athlete	Race	
Event	Athlete	Time	Rank
10 km C	Vitaly Lilichenko	32:54.5	80
10 km C	Andrey Nevzorov	31:30.4	68
10 km C	Pavel Ryabinin	30:37.0	50
10 km C	Vladimir Smirnov	27:45.1	4
15 km pursuit^{1} F	Vitaly Lilichenko	48:58.1	59
15 km pursuit^{1} F	Andrey Nevzorov	45:30.7	48
15 km pursuit^{1} F	Pavel Ryabinin	44:41.7	36
15 km pursuit^{1} F	Vladimir Smirnov	40:07.5	3rd place, bronze medalist(s)
30 km C	Vladimir Bortsov	1'45:12.8	50
30 km C	Andrey Nevzorov	1'42:48.8	41
30 km C	Pavel Ryabinin	1'39:31.6	13
30 km C	Vladimir Smirnov	1'38:59.1	12
50 km F	Vitaly Lilichenko	2'25:58.0	55
50 km F	Vladimir Bortsov	2'20:39.3	45
50 km F	Andrey Nevzorov	2'15:14.7	23
50 km F	Vladimir Smirnov	2'07:26.4	8

^{1} Starting delay based on 10 km results.
C = Classical style, F = Freestyle

Men's 4 × 10 km relay

Athletes	Race	
Athletes	Time	Rank
Pavel Ryabinin; Vladimir Bortsov; Andrey Nevzorov; Vitaly Lilichenko	1'46:12.9	16

Women

Event	Athlete	Race	
Event	Athlete	Time	Rank
5 km C	Olga Seleznyova	20:27.7	66
5 km C	Svetlana Deshevykh	19:25.3	44
5 km C	Svetlana Shishkina-Malakhova	19:10.7	35
5 km C	Oksana Yatskaya	18:57.3	27
10 km pursuit^{2} F	Olga Seleznyova	36:00.6	63
10 km pursuit^{2} F	Svetlana Shishkina-Malakhova	32:39.4	42
10 km pursuit^{2} F	Oksana Yatskaya	32:20.5	39
10 km pursuit^{2} F	Svetlana Deshevykh	32:20.2	38
15 km C	Yelena Volodina-Antonova	55:34.0	57
15 km C	Svetlana Shishkina-Malakhova	53:13.7	49
15 km C	Oksana Yatskaya	51:39.7	32
15 km C	Svetlana Deshevykh	50:28.0	20
30 km F	Olga Seleznyova	1'36:30.6	52
30 km F	Oksana Yatskaya	1'33:23.4	40
30 km F	Svetlana Shishkina-Malakhova	1'31:39.7	30
30 km F	Svetlana Deshevykh	1'29:48.1	21

^{2} Starting delay based on 5 km results.
C = Classical style, F = Freestyle

Women's 4 × 5 km relay

Athletes	Race	
Athletes	Time	Rank
Svetlana Deshevykh; Oksana Yatskaya; Svetlana Shishkina-Malakhova; Olga Seleznyova	59:11.3	12

== Figure skating ==
Men

Athlete	SP	FS	TFP	Rank
Yourii Litvinov	28	DNF	DNF	–

Pairs

Athletes	SP	FS	TFP	Rank
Marina Khalturina; Andrei Kroukov	16	14	22.0	14

Ice dancing

Athletes	CD1	CD2	OD	FD	TFP	Rank
Elizaveta Stekolnikova; Dmitrii Kazarlyga	23	22	22	22	44.2	22

== Freestyle skiing ==
Men

Athlete	Event	Qualification			Final		
Athlete	Event	Time	Points	Rank	Time	Points	Rank
Aleksey Bannikov	Moguls	29.06	20.18	26	did not advance		

Women

Athlete	Event	Qualification			Final		
Athlete	Event	Time	Points	Rank	Time	Points	Rank
Irina Kormysheva	Moguls	DNF	–	–	–	DNF	–

== Ice hockey ==
Summary Key:

- OT – Overtime
- GWS – Match decided by penalty-shootout

Team	Event	Group stage			Qualification playoff	Quarterfinal	Semifinal	Final / BM	
Team	Event	Opposition Score	Opposition Score	Opposition Score	Opposition Score	Opposition Score	Opposition Score	Opposition Score	Rank
Kazakhstan men's	Men's tournament	Russia; L 2–9	Switzerland; L 2–8	Finland; L 2–8	—	Canada; L 1–4	Did not advance		8

=== Men's tournament ===
==== Preliminary round - Group A ====
Top team (shaded) advanced to the first round.

Team	GP	W	L	T	GF	GA	GD	Pts
Kazakhstan	3	2	0	1	14	11	+3	5
Slovakia	3	1	1	1	9	9	0	3
Italy	3	1	2	0	11	11	0	2
Austria	3	0	1	2	9	12	-3	2

All times are local (UTC-7).

7 February 1998	Kazakhstan	5 – 3 (1-3, 1-0, 3-0)	Italy	The Big Hat / Aqua Wing Arena, Nagano, Japan; Attendance: 8,634

8 February 1998	Austria	5 – 5 (2-2, 2-1, 1-2)	Kazakhstan	The Big Hat / Aqua Wing Arena, Nagano, Japan; Attendance: 9,410

10 February 1998	Slovakia	3 – 4 (1-1, 1-0, 1-3)	Kazakhstan	The Big Hat / Aqua Wing Arena, Nagano, Japan; Attendance: 3,659

==== First round - Group D ====
Team	GP	W	L	T	GF	GA	GD	Pts
Russia	3	3	0	0	15	6	+9	6
Czech Republic	3	2	1	0	12	4	+8	4
Finland	3	1	2	0	11	9	+2	2
Kazakhstan	3	0	3	0	6	25	-19	0

All times are local (UTC-7).

13 February 1998	Russia	9 – 2 (2-1, 5-0, 2-1)	Kazakhstan	The Big Hat / Aqua Wing Arena, Nagano, Japan; Attendance: 3,752

15 February 1998	Czech Republic	8 – 2 (0-1, 2-3, 0-4)	Kazakhstan	The Big Hat / Aqua Wing Arena, Nagano, Japan; Attendance: 9,975

16 February 1998	Finland	8 – 2 (1-3, 0-1, 1-4)	Kazakhstan	The Big Hat / Aqua Wing Arena, Nagano, Japan; Attendance: 5,544

==== Quarterfinal ====
All times are local (UTC-7).

18 February 1998	Canada	4 – 1 (2-1, 2-0, 0-0)	Kazakhstan	The Big Hat/ Aqua Wing Arena, Nagano, Japan; Attendance: 9,602

==== Leading scorers ====
Rank	Player	GP	G	A	Pts	PIM
4th	Aleksandr Koreshkov	7	3	6	9	2
6th	Konstantin Shafranov	7	4	3	7	6

- Team roster

- Aleksandr Koreshkov
- Konstantin Shafranov
- Mikhail Borodulin
- Yevgeniy Koreshkov
- Vladimir Zavyalov
- Igor Zemlyanov
- Dmitriy Dudarev
- Andrey Pchelyakov
- Andrey Sokolov
- Pavel Kamentsev
- Vitaly Tregubov
- Vadim Glovatsky
- Andrey Savenkov
- Vladimir Antipin
- Piotr Deviatkin
- Igor Dorohkin
- Alexander Shimin
- Alexey Trochshinsky
- Vitaliy Yeremeyev

== Ski jumping ==
Athlete	Event	Jump 1			Jump 2		Total	
Athlete	Event	Distance	Points	Rank	Distance	Points	Points	Rank
Aleksandr Kolmakov	Normal hill	67.5	63.0	58	did not advance			
Pavel Gayduk	Normal hill	72.0	76.5	48	did not advance			
Stanislav Filimonov	Normal hill	75.5	85.0	32	did not advance			
Dmitry Chvykov	Normal hill	79.0	93.5	25 Q	75.0	83.5	177.0	30
Dmitry Chvykov	Large hill	101.5	76.2	49	did not advance			
Aleksandr Kolmakov	Large hill	101.5	80.7	46	did not advance			
Pavel Gayduk	Large hill	104.5	87.1	42	did not advance			
Stanislav Filimonov	Large hill	111.0	98.3	27 Q	116.0	108.3	206.6	25

Men's team large hill

Athletes	Result	
Athletes	Points ^{1}	Rank
Pavel Gayduk; Aleksandr Kolmakov; Dmitry Chvykov; Stanislav Filimonov	602.0	11

^{1} Four teams members performed two jumps each.

== Speed skating ==
Men

Event	Athlete	Race 1		Race 2		Total	
Event	Athlete	Time	Rank	Time	Rank	Time	Rank
500 m	Vladimir Klepinin	37.22	36	36.92	31	74.14	32
500 m	Vadim Shakshakbayev	36.87	29	36.57	23	73.44	24
1000 m	Vladimir Klepinin					1:14.38	37
1000 m	Sergey Tsybenko					1:12.40	17
1500 m	Sergey Kaznacheyev					1:55.22	41
1500 m	Radik Bikchentayev					1:52.87	27
1500 m	Sergey Tsybenko					1:52.03	19
5000 m	Radik Bikchentayev					6:52.65	27
5000 m	Sergey Kaznacheyev					6:51.50	26

Women

Event	Athlete	Race	
Event	Athlete	Time	Rank
1500 m	Lyudmila Prokasheva	2:01.65	11
3000 m	Kenzhesh Sarsekenova-Orynbayeva	4:42.07	31
3000 m	Lyudmila Prokasheva	4:14.23	7
5000 m	Lyudmila Prokasheva	7:11.14	3rd place, bronze medalist(s)
