= Biathlon at the 2003 Asian Winter Games – Women's sprint =

Women's 7.5 kilometre sprint at the 2003 Asian Winter Games
- Venue: Iwakisan Sports Park
- Dates: 3 February 2003
- Competitors: 17 from 5 nations

Medalists
gold medal	Tamami Tanaka	Japan
silver medal	Kong Yingchao	China
bronze medal	Liu Xianying	China

The women's 7.5 kilometre sprint at the 2003 Asian Winter Games was held on 3 February 2003 at Iwakisan Sports Park, Japan.

== Schedule ==
All times are Japan Standard Time (UTC+09:00)

Date	Time	Event
Monday, 3 February 2003	13:00	Final

== Results ==
Rank	Athlete	Penalties			Time
Rank	Athlete	P	S	Total	Time
1st place, gold medalist(s)	Tamami Tanaka (JPN)	1	3	4	24:30.9
2nd place, silver medalist(s)	Kong Yingchao (CHN)	1	2	3	24:43.9
3rd place, bronze medalist(s)	Liu Xianying (CHN)	0	3	3	24:50.6
4	Yelena Dubok (KAZ)	1	1	2	25:23.1
5	Sun Ribo (CHN)	3	1	4	25:25.9
6	Liu Yuanyuan (CHN)	2	2	4	25:36.5
7	Kanae Suzuki (JPN)	3	4	7	26:27.3
8	Viktoriya Afanasyeva (KAZ)	2	3	5	26:31.5
9	Sanae Takano (JPN)	3	2	5	26:46.9
10	Inna Mozhevitina (KAZ)	0	2	2	27:51.3
11	Ikuyo Tsukidate (JPN)	3	4	7	28:09.1
12	Olga Dudchenko (KAZ)	3	0	3	28:13.4
13	Kim Ja-youn (KOR)	1	1	2	28:21.6
14	Baik Mi-ra (KOR)	1	3	4	29:34.5
15	Jung Yang-mi (KOR)	2	3	5	31:42.6
16	Dong Jung-lim (KOR)	2	2	4	33:44.2
17	Shirnengiin Bolortsetseg (MGL)	5	5	10	41:20.2
