= Biathlon at the 2003 Asian Winter Games – Women's relay =

Women's 4 × 6 kilometre relay at the 2003 Asian Winter Games
- Venue: Iwakisan Sports Park
- Dates: 7 February 2003
- Competitors: 16 from 4 nations

Medalists
gold medal	China; Kong Yingchao, Liu Xianying, Sun Ribo, Yu Shumei
silver medal	Japan; Sanae Takano, Tamami Tanaka, Ikuyo Tsukidate, Kanae Suzuki
bronze medal	Kazakhstan; Yelena Dubok, Olga Dudchenko, Inna Mozhevitina, Viktoriya Afanasyeva

The women's 4×6 kilometre relay at the 2003 Asian Winter Games was held on 7 February 2003 at the Iwakisan Sports Park, Japan.

== Schedule ==
All times are Japan Standard Time (UTC+09:00)

Date	Time	Event
Friday, 7 February 2003	10:00	Final

== Results ==
Rank	Team	Penalties			Time
Rank	Team	P	S	Total	Time
1st place, gold medalist(s)	China (CHN)	0+4	1+7	1+11	1:27:45.9
	Kong Yingchao	0+0	0+1	0+1	19:41.2
	Liu Xianying	0+1	0+1	0+2	20:13.8
	Sun Ribo	0+0	1+3	1+3	23:16.2
	Yu Shumei	0+3	0+2	0+5	24:34.7
2nd place, silver medalist(s)	Japan (JPN)	3+12	4+9	7+21	1:28:26.0
	Sanae Takano	1+3	0+0	1+3	20:16.1
	Tamami Tanaka	0+3	2+3	2+6	21:30.4
	Ikuyo Tsukidate	1+3	0+3	1+6	23:43.9
	Kanae Suzuki	1+3	2+3	3+6	22:55.6
3rd place, bronze medalist(s)	Kazakhstan (KAZ)	0+6	0+5	0+11	1:31:15.2
	Yelena Dubok	0+2	0+1	0+3	21:10.9
	Olga Dudchenko	0+1	0+2	0+3	22:42.2
	Inna Mozhevitina	0+1	0+0	0+1	25:11.3
	Viktoriya Afanasyeva	0+2	0+2	0+4	22:10.8
4	South Korea (KOR)	1+6	0+8	1+14	1:38:28.6
	Kim Ja-youn	0+0	0+2	0+2	21:49.5
	Kim Young-ja	0+3	0+2	0+5	24:05.1
	Baik Mi-ra	1+3	0+2	1+5	27:15.4
	Jung Yang-mi	0+0	0+2	0+2	25:18.6
