= Biathlon at the 2003 Asian Winter Games – Women's pursuit =

Women's 10 kilometre pursuit at the 2003 Asian Winter Games
- Venue: Iwakisan Sports Park
- Dates: 5 February 2003
- Competitors: 17 from 5 nations

Medalists
gold medal	Kong Yingchao	China
silver medal	Liu Xianying	China
bronze medal	Sun Ribo	China

The women's 10 kilometre sprint at the 2003 Asian Winter Games was held on 5 February 2003 at the Iwakisan Sports Park, Japan.

== Schedule ==
All times are Japan Standard Time (UTC+09:00)

Date	Time	Event
Wednesday, 5 February 2003	13:00	Final

== Results ==
Rank	Athlete	Start	Penalties					Time
Rank	Athlete	Start	P	P	S	S	Total	Time
1st place, gold medalist(s)	Kong Yingchao (CHN)	0:13	0	2	2	0	4	40:17.9
2nd place, silver medalist(s)	Liu Xianying (CHN)	0:20	1	0	1	1	3	41:16.8
3rd place, bronze medalist(s)	Sun Ribo (CHN)	0:55	0	0	3	2	5	42:28.7
4	Tamami Tanaka (JPN)	0:00	2	1	3	2	8	42:34.0
5	Yelena Dubok (KAZ)	0:52	1	1	2	0	4	43:36.4
6	Kanae Suzuki (JPN)	1:56	2	3	2	3	10	46:25.3
7	Ikuyo Tsukidate (JPN)	3:38	3	0	2	2	7	46:40.2
8	Viktoriya Afanasyeva (KAZ)	2:01	3	3	3	0	9	48:23.5
9	Liu Yuanyuan (CHN)	1:06	2	3	2	3	10	49:21.4
10	Sanae Takano (JPN)	2:16	1	5	2	4	12	50:14.2
11	Olga Dudchenko (KAZ)	3:42	4	1	2	0	7	51:29.0
12	Kim Ja-youn (KOR)	3:51	1	2	4	2	9	54:05.5
13	Inna Mozhevitina (KAZ)	3:20	4	5	2	0	11	55:17.0
14	Jung Yang-mi (KOR)	5:00	2	2	1	1	6	57:10.9
15	Baik Mi-ra (KOR)	5:00	4	1	3	5	13	59:48.4
16	Dong Jung-lim (KOR)	5:00	2	3	2	4	11	1:03:37.2
17	Shirnengiin Bolortsetseg (MGL)	5:00	5	4	5	4	18	1:09:46.1
