= Biathlon at the 2002 Winter Olympics – Women's individual =

Women's biathlon individual at the XIX Olympic Winter Games
- Venue: Soldier Hollow
- Dates: 11 February 2002
- Competitors: 71 from 26 nations
- Winning time: 47:29.1

Medalists
1st place, gold medalist(s)		Andrea Henkel	Germany
2nd place, silver medalist(s)		Liv Grete Poirée	Norway
3rd place, bronze medalist(s)		Magdalena Forsberg	Sweden

The women's 15-kilometre individual biathlon competition at the 2002 Winter Olympics was held on 11 February, at Soldier Hollow. Competitors raced over five loops of a 3.0-kilometre skiing course, shooting four times, twice prone and twice standing. Each miss resulted in one minute being added to a competitor's skiing time.

== Results ==
The Biathlon World Cup test event in 2001 was won by Magdalena Forsberg, who shot clear and won by more than a minute from Martina Zellner, a German who was not selected for her national team for the 2002 Games. Forsberg was also the defending world champion and World Cup champion in the distance , and led the World Cup in the discipline, having won two of the three Individual races earlier in the season. However despite a long history of success, she had never won an Olympic medal. Liv Grete Skjelbreid-Poirée won the other event of the season, at Antholz, while Ekaterina Dafovska was the defending Olympic champion.

The 25-year-old Andrea Henkel started before some of her more heralded competition, but recovered well after missing a shot on her second loop, making all ten of her remaining shots to add just the single minute to her ski time. Katrin Apel and Uschi Disl each beat Henkel's time going into the final shoot, despite missing shots earlier, but both missed three times on the final shoot, ending up outside the top 10. Olga Pyleva set the fastest times after the second and third shoots, leading Henkel by more than a minute, but sent two wide on the last shoot, and ended up 45 seconds behind the leading German. Defending champion Ekaterina Dafovska missed one shot in the race, like Henkel, but her ski speed wasn't enough to get close to a medal.

Liv Grete Skjelbreid-Poirée had an identical shooting line to Henkel, and while she was ahead of the German on the first two shoots, she fell behind on ski time, and ended up seven seconds back in second, well ahead of Pyleva, then in bronze position. The final serious challenge was from Magdalena Forsberg, who had won many World Championships, but did not have an Olympic medal. Forsberg was well over a minute clear of Henkel and Poirée as she approached the final shoot, but missed twice, losing any chance at gold. She did manage to get in for bronze, displacing Pyleva.

The race was started at 11:00.

Rank	Bib	Name	Country	Result	Penalties	Deficit
1st place, gold medalist(s)	26	Andrea Henkel	Germany	47:29.1	1 (0+1+0+0)	
2nd place, silver medalist(s)	56	Liv Grete Poirée	Norway	47:37.0	1 (0+1+0+0)	+7.9
3rd place, bronze medalist(s)	65	Magdalena Forsberg	Sweden	48:08.3	2 (0+0+0+2)	+39.2
4	43	Olga Pyleva	Russia	48:14.0	2 (0+0+0+2)	+44.9
5	48	Ekaterina Dafovska	Bulgaria	48:15.5	1 (0+1+0+0)	+46.4
6	44	Olga Nazarova	Belarus	48:29.9	1 (0+1+0+0)	+1:00.8
7	41	Martina Glagow	Germany	48:34.2	1 (1+0+0+0)	+1:05.1
8	29	Svetlana Ishmuratova	Russia	48:45.0	2 (1+0+0+1)	+1:15.9
9	5	Martina Jašicová	Slovakia	48:47.5	2 (0+1+0+1)	+1:18.4
10	47	Albina Akhatova	Russia	49:06.1	2 (2+0+0+0)	+1:37.0
11	40	Florence Baverel-Robert	France	49:10.2	2 (0+0+2+0)	+1:41.1
12	39	Uschi Disl	Germany	49:43.4	4 (0+1+0+3)	+2:14.3
13	52	Katja Holanti	Finland	49:52.3	2 (0+0+1+1)	+2:23.2
14	45	Soňa Mihoková	Slovakia	50:00.7	3 (0+1+1+1)	+2:31.6
15	55	Sun Ribo	China	50:04.7	1 (0+1+0+0)	+2:35.6
16	4	Sylvie Becaert	France	50:09.0	2 (0+0+0+2)	+2:39.9
17	69	Liu Xianying	China	50:09.4	0 (0+0+0+0)	+2:40.3
18	30	Katrin Apel	Germany	50:16.7	5 (0+2+0+3)	+2:47.6
19	57	Kateřina Losmanová	Czech Republic	50:42.0	3 (1+1+1+0)	+3:12.9
20	68	Pavlina Filipova	Bulgaria	50:47.5	3 (2+0+0+1)	+3:18.4
21	24	Corinne Niogret	France	50:49.6	1 (0+1+0+0)	+3:20.5
22	66	Ann Elen Skjelbreid	Norway	50:51.1	3 (0+1+1+1)	+3:22.0
23	21	Zdeňka Vejnarová	Czech Republic	50:54.7	1 (0+0+0+1)	+3:25.6
24	59	Olena Petrova	Ukraine	51:05.7	1 (0+0+1+0)	+3:36.6
25	71	Lucija Larisi	Slovenia	51:12.1	2 (0+1+0+1)	+3:43.0
26	60	Delphyne Burlet	France	51:19.2	2 (1+0+1+0)	+3:50.1
27	62	Oksana Yakovlieva	Ukraine	51:22.2	2 (1+0+0+1)	+3:53.1
28	67	Irena Česneková	Czech Republic	51:28.0	2 (0+0+2+0)	+3:58.9
29	23	Oksana Khvostenko	Ukraine	51:34.4	0 (0+0+0+0)	+4:05.3
30	17	Gunn Margit Andreassen	Norway	51:42.9	3 (0+1+1+1)	+4:13.8
31	15	Rachel Steer	United States	51:50.6	2 (0+1+1+0)	+4:21.5
32	42	Iva Karagiozova	Bulgaria	51:59.3	2 (1+1+0+0)	+4:30.2
33	63	Marcela Pavkovčeková	Slovakia	52:03.7	4 (1+0+3+0)	+4:34.6
34	58	Olena Zubrilova	Ukraine	52:10.7	3 (1+1+1+0)	+4:41.6
35	13	Eva Háková	Czech Republic	52:11.0	3 (1+1+0+1)	+4:41.9
36	50	Michela Ponza	Italy	52:13.6	2 (1+0+1+0)	+4:44.5
37	31	Olga Zaitseva	Russia	52:26.2	4 (1+0+1+2)	+4:57.1
38	37	Kseniya Zikunkova	Belarus	52:26.8	3 (1+0+0+2)	+4:57.7
39	46	Linda Tjørhom	Norway	52:34.0	4 (1+1+0+2)	+5:04.9
40	25	Sanna-Leena Perunka	Finland	52:48.8	3 (1+0+0+2)	+5:19.7
41	36	Tadeja Brankovič	Slovenia	53:08.9	4 (1+2+0+1)	+5:39.8
42	51	Hiromi Suga	Japan	53:10.6	3 (1+0+1+1)	+5:41.5
43	2	Irina Nikulchina	Bulgaria	53:16.7	6 (3+2+0+1)	+5:47.6
44	8	Kong Yingchao	China	53:38.0	2 (1+0+0+1)	+6:08.9
45	61	Tamami Tanaka	Japan	53:40.4	4 (3+1+0+0)	+6:11.3
46	38	Yu Shumei	China	53:43.0	5 (1+2+0+2)	+6:13.9
47	6	Katja Haller	Italy	53:44.0	2 (2+0+0+0)	+6:14.9
48	49	Outi Kettunen	Finland	53:48.1	4 (0+1+1+2)	+6:19.0
49	64	Saskia Santer	Italy	54:14.7	7 (2+2+2+1)	+6:45.6
50	22	Ryoko Takahashi	Japan	54:18.0	4 (0+1+0+3)	+6:48.9
51	9	Lyudmila Lysenko	Belarus	54:25.4	4 (4+0+0+0)	+6:56.3
52	14	Éva Tófalvi	Romania	54:36.7	3 (2+0+1+0)	+7:07.6
53	32	Anna Murínová	Slovakia	54:39.2	5 (1+2+2+0)	+7:10.1
54	7	Anna Stera-Kustucz	Poland	54:47.1	4 (2+1+0+1)	+7:18.0
55	54	Kristina Sabasteanski	United States	55:00.9	4 (0+1+0+3)	+7:31.8
56	53	Andreja Grašič	Slovenia	55:06.4	8 (2+3+2+1)	+7:37.3
57	1	Dijana Grudiček	Slovenia	55:50.3	7 (0+4+1+2)	+8:21.2
58	27	Ivett Szöllősi	Hungary	56:34.8	1 (0+0+0+1)	+9:05.7
59	20	Kara Salmela	United States	57:25.9	8 (1+1+2+4)	+9:56.8
60	34	Yelena Dubok	Kazakhstan	57:32.5	5 (0+2+1+2)	+10:03.4
61	18	Dana Cojocea	Romania	57:37.0	5 (2+1+0+2)	+10:07.9
62	28	Valentina Ciurina	Moldova	58:40.8	6 (1+1+3+1)	+11:11.7
63	33	Andžela Brice	Latvia	59:20.9	6 (1+2+1+2)	+11:51.8
64	16	Mami Shindo	Japan	59:38.6	8 (3+2+2+1)	+12:09.5
65	3	Zsuzsanna Bekecs	Hungary	1:00:40.7	5 (2+2+0+1)	+13:11.6
66	35	Kim Ja-youn	South Korea	1:01:13.8	7 (2+2+0+3)	+13:44.7
67	12	Claudia Barrenechea	Chile	1:02:30.0	3 (1+1+1+0)	+15:00.9
68	11	Despoina Vavatsi	Greece	1:04:39.4	7 (0+2+1+4)	+17:10.3
69	10	Natalia Lovece	Argentina	1:09:56.8	12 (4+2+2+4)	+22:27.7
	19	Nathalie Santer	Italy	DNF	(3+2+2+ )	
	70	Lyudmila Ananko	Belarus	DNF	(0+1+0+ )	
