= Biathlon at the 2003 Asian Winter Games – Men's sprint =

Men's 10 kilometre sprint at the 2003 Asian Winter Games
- Venue: Iwakisan Sports Park
- Dates: 3 February 2003
- Competitors: 16 from 4 nations

Medalists
gold medal	Hironao Meguro	Japan
silver medal	Sunao Noto	Japan
bronze medal	Tatsumi Kasahara	Japan

The men's 10 kilometre sprint at the 2003 Asian Winter Games was held on 3 February 2003 at Iwakisan Sports Park, Japan.

== Schedule ==
All times are Japan Standard Time (UTC+09:00)

Date	Time	Event
Monday, 3 February 2003	10:00	Final

== Results ==
Rank	Athlete	Penalties			Time
Rank	Athlete	P	S	Total	Time
1st place, gold medalist(s)	Hironao Meguro (JPN)	2	1	3	28:40.3
2nd place, silver medalist(s)	Sunao Noto (JPN)	1	2	3	29:14.8
3rd place, bronze medalist(s)	Tatsumi Kasahara (JPN)	3	1	4	29:45.8
4	Yerden Abdrakhmanov (KAZ)	1	1	2	30:02.7
5	Qiu Lianhai (CHN)	2	1	3	30:05.0
6	Kyoji Suga (JPN)	3	4	7	30:23.7
7	Son Hae-kwon (KOR)	1	0	1	30:53.4
8	Zhang Qing (CHN)	2	3	5	30:56.3
9	Alexandr Fadeyev (KAZ)	1	1	2	31:20.0
10	Dmitriy Pozdnyakov (KAZ)	3	2	5	31:23.9
11	Igor Zelenkov (KAZ)	1	3	4	31:36.1
12	Kim Kyung-tae (KOR)	2	1	3	31:51.8
13	Wang Xin (CHN)	3	1	4	32:29.9
14	Zhang Hongjun (CHN)	2	3	5	32:46.4
15	Shin Byung-kook (KOR)	4	2	6	33:08.1
16	Park Yoon-bae (KOR)	4	3	7	34:59.8
