= Biathlon at the 2003 Asian Winter Games – Men's relay =

Men's 4 × 7.5 kilometre relay at the 2003 Asian Winter Games
- Venue: Iwakisan Sports Park
- Dates: 7 February 2003
- Competitors: 16 from 4 nations

Medalists
gold medal	Japan; Sunao Noto, Hironao Meguro, Tatsumi Kasahara, Kyoji Suga
silver medal	South Korea; Son Hae-kwon, Kim Kyung-tae, Shin Byung-kook, Park Yoon-bae
bronze medal	China; Qiu Lianhai, Zhang Hongjun, Zhang Qing, Wang Xin

The men's 4×7.5 kilometre relay at the 2003 Asian Winter Games was held on 7 February 2003 at the Iwakisan Sports Park, Japan.

== Schedule ==
All times are Japan Standard Time (UTC+09:00)

Date	Time	Event
Friday, 7 February 2003	10:00	Final

== Results ==
Rank	Team	Penalties			Time
Rank	Team	P	S	Total	Time
1st place, gold medalist(s)	Japan (JPN)	0+5	0+10	0+15	1:25:40.0
	Sunao Noto	0+1	0+3	0+4	20:23.5
	Hironao Meguro	0+0	0+2	0+2	20:26.2
	Tatsumi Kasahara	0+1	0+3	0+4	23:06.8
	Kyoji Suga	0+3	0+2	0+5	21:43.5
2nd place, silver medalist(s)	South Korea (KOR)	0+10	0+4	0+14	1:32:36.1
	Son Hae-kwon	0+3	0+1	0+4	22:01.7
	Kim Kyung-tae	0+1	0+2	0+3	21:57.3
	Shin Byung-kook	0+3	0+1	0+4	23:39.4
	Park Yoon-bae	0+3	0+0	0+3	24:57.7
3rd place, bronze medalist(s)	China (CHN)	0+5	3+8	3+13	1:33:49.3
	Qiu Lianhai	0+1	2+3	2+4	22:56.5
	Zhang Hongjun	0+1	0+0	0+1	22:16.0
	Zhang Qing	0+1	0+2	0+3	23:58.8
	Wang Xin	0+2	1+3	1+5	24:38.0
4	Kazakhstan (KAZ)	2+9	3+11	5+20	1:33:49.6
	Yerden Abdrakhmanov	0+1	1+3	1+4	22:31.0
	Igor Zelenkov	2+3	1+3	3+6	23:44.2
	Alexandr Fadeyev	0+3	1+3	1+6	26:02.3
	Dmitriy Pozdnyakov	0+2	0+2	0+4	21:32.1
