= Biathlon at the 2007 Asian Winter Games =

- Venue: Beida Lake Skiing Resort
- Dates: 29 January – 2 February 2007
- Competitors: 42 from 7 nations

Biathlon at the 2007 Asian Winter Games was held at the Beida Lake Skiing Resort in Changchun, China from 29 January to 2 February 2007.

== Schedule ==
F	Final

Event↓/Date →	29th Mon	30th Tue	31st Wed	1st Thu	2nd Fri
Men's 10 km sprint	F				
Men's 20 km individual				F	
Men's 4 × 7.5 km relay					F
Women's 7.5 km sprint	F				
Women's 10 km pursuit		F			
Women's 15 km individual				F	
Women's 4 × 6 km relay					F

== Medalists ==
=== Men ===
Event	Gold	Silver	Bronze
10 km sprint	Hidenori Isa; Japan	Zhang Chengye; China	Zhang Qing; China
20 km individual	Alexandr Chervyakov; Kazakhstan	Zhang Qing; China	Hidenori Isa; Japan
4 × 7.5 km relay	China; Zhang Qing; Ren Long; Zhang Chengye; Tian Ye	Japan; Tatsumi Kasahara; Hidenori Isa; Yoshiyuki Asari; Shinya Saito	Kazakhstan; Sergey Naumik; Alexandr Trifonov; Yerden Abdrakhmanov; Alexandr Chervyakov

=== Women ===
Event	Gold	Silver	Bronze
7.5 km sprint	Liu Xianying; China	Kong Yingchao; China	Dong Xue; China
7.5 km sprint	Liu Xianying; China	Kong Yingchao; China	Tamami Tanaka; Japan
10 km pursuit	Kong Yingchao; China	Liu Xianying; China	Dong Xue; China
10 km pursuit	Kong Yingchao; China	Liu Xianying; China	Yelena Khrustaleva; Kazakhstan
15 km individual	Liu Xianying; China	Kong Yingchao; China	Inna Mozhevitina; Kazakhstan
4 × 6 km relay	China; Kong Yingchao; Dong Xue; Yin Qiao; Liu Xianying	Kazakhstan; Yelena Khrustaleva; Viktoriya Afanasyeva; Olga Dudchenko; Inna Mozhevitina	Japan; Megumi Izumi; Tamami Tanaka; Megumi Matsuura; Ikuyo Tsukidate

== Medal table ==
Rank	Nation	Gold	Silver	Bronze	Total
1	China (CHN)	5	5	3	13
2	Japan (JPN)	1	1	3	5
2	Kazakhstan (KAZ)	1	1	3	5
Totals (3 entries)		7	7	9	23

== Participating nations ==
A total of 42 athletes from 7 nations competed in biathlon at the 2007 Asian Winter Games:

- China (9)
- Chinese Taipei (2)
- Japan (8)
- Kazakhstan (10)
- Kyrgyzstan (1)
- Mongolia (2)
- South Korea (10)
