= Biathlon at the 2003 Asian Winter Games – Men's pursuit =

Men's 12.5 kilometre pursuit at the 2003 Asian Winter Games
- Venue: Iwakisan Sports Park
- Dates: 5 February 2003
- Competitors: 16 from 4 nations

Medalists
gold medal	Hironao Meguro	Japan
silver medal	Sunao Noto	Japan
bronze medal	Kyoji Suga	Japan

The men's 12.5 kilometre sprint at the 2003 Asian Winter Games was held on 5 February 2003 at Iwakisan Sports Park, Japan.

== Schedule ==
All times are Japan Standard Time (UTC+09:00)

Date	Time	Event
Wednesday, 5 February 2003	10:00	Final

== Results ==
Rank	Athlete	Start	Penalties					Time
Rank	Athlete	Start	P	P	S	S	Total	Time
1st place, gold medalist(s)	Hironao Meguro (JPN)	0:00	2	0	0	2	4	39:09.8
2nd place, silver medalist(s)	Sunao Noto (JPN)	0:34	1	2	2	1	6	41:34.3
3rd place, bronze medalist(s)	Kyoji Suga (JPN)	1:43	3	1	0	2	6	41:56.9
4	Yerden Abdrakhmanov (KAZ)	1:22	0	0	3	2	5	43:47.5
5	Qiu Lianhai (CHN)	1:25	2	2	1	2	7	45:20.0
6	Tatsumi Kasahara (JPN)	1:05	3	4	2	3	12	45:44.8
7	Dmitriy Pozdnyakov (KAZ)	2:44	1	1	1	2	5	45:46.0
8	Zhang Qing (CHN)	2:16	4	2	2	2	10	46:24.0
9	Igor Zelenkov (KAZ)	2:56	4	1	4	1	10	46:31.3
10	Kim Kyung-tae (KOR)	3:11	2	1	1	0	4	46:36.2
11	Shin Byung-kook (KOR)	4:28	0	1	1	1	3	47:45.3
12	Son Hae-kwon (KOR)	2:13	1	1	2	0	4	48:28.9
13	Zhang Hongjun (CHN)	4:06	3	1	0	1	5	49:01.8
14	Wang Xin (CHN)	3:50	2	0	3	3	8	49:54.8
15	Alexandr Fadeyev (KAZ)	2:40	2	4	4	4	14	54:31.5
16	Park Yoon-bae (KOR)	5:00	2	2	2	2	8	55:01.0
