= Biathlon at the 1999 Asian Winter Games – Women's individual =

Women's 15 kilometre individual at the 1999 Asian Winter Games
- Venue: Provincial Nordic Venue
- Dates: 1 February 1999
- Competitors: 14 from 4 nations

Medalists
| gold medal | Yu Shumei | China |
| silver medal | Liu Xianying | China |
| bronze medal | Margarita Dulova | Kazakhstan |

The women's 15 kilometre individual at the 1999 Asian Winter Games was held on 1 February 1999 at Yongpyong Cross Country Venue, South Korea.

== Schedule ==
All times are Korea Standard Time (UTC+09:00)

| Date | Time | Event |
|---|---|---|
| Monday, 1 February 1999 | 13:00 | Final |

== Results ==
| Rank | Athlete | Time |
|---|---|---|
| 1st place, gold medalist(s) | Yu Shumei (CHN) | 55:44.9 |
| 2nd place, silver medalist(s) | Liu Xianying (CHN) | 56:50.7 |
| 3rd place, bronze medalist(s) | Margarita Dulova (KAZ) | 57:07.2 |
| 4 | Yelena Dubok (KAZ) | 58:51.8 |
| 5 | Sun Ribo (CHN) | 59:22.3 |
| 6 | Kong Yingchao (CHN) | 59:26.5 |
| 7 | Galina Avtayeva (KAZ) | 59:57.9 |
| 8 | Lyudmila Guryeva (KAZ) | 1:01:40.1 |
| 9 | Kyoko Yamauchi (JPN) | 1:02:32.3 |
| 10 | Shiho Maruyama (JPN) | 1:07:12.1 |
| 11 | Kim Ja-youn (KOR) | 1:09:35.4 |
| 12 | Yoo Jea-sun (KOR) | 1:11:21.8 |
| 13 | Park Yun-jung (KOR) | 1:12:12.1 |
| 14 | Choi Mi-jung (KOR) | 1:12:24.2 |
