= Biathlon at the 1999 Asian Winter Games – Women's sprint =

Women's 7.5 kilometre sprint at the 1999 Asian Winter Games
- Venue: Provincial Nordic Venue
- Dates: 3 February 1999
- Competitors: 14 from 4 nations

Medalists
gold medal	Yu Shumei	China
silver medal	Margarita Dulova	Kazakhstan
bronze medal	Sun Ribo	China

The women's 7.5 kilometre sprint at the 1999 Asian Winter Games was held on 3 February 1999 at Yongpyong Cross Country Venue, South Korea.

== Schedule ==
All times are Korea Standard Time (UTC+09:00)

Date	Time	Event
Wednesday, 3 February 1999	13:00	Final

== Results ==
Rank	Athlete	Penalties			Time
Rank	Athlete	P	S	Total	Time
1st place, gold medalist(s)	Yu Shumei (CHN)	1	0	1	23:57.5
2nd place, silver medalist(s)	Margarita Dulova (KAZ)	1	0	1	24:40.2
3rd place, bronze medalist(s)	Sun Ribo (CHN)	0	1	1	24:55.3
4	Liu Xianying (CHN)	1	0	1	24:59.3
5	Lyudmila Guryeva (KAZ)	1	1	2	25:47.0
6	Yelena Dubok (KAZ)	1	1	2	25:50.6
7	Shiho Maruyama (JPN)	1	2	3	26:28.7
8	Galina Avtayeva (KAZ)	1	2	3	26:42.2
9	Liu Jinfeng (CHN)	3	1	4	27:32.6
10	Kyoko Yamauchi (JPN)	2	5	7	27:54.9
11	Kim Mi-young (KOR)	1	1	2	30:18.0
12	Yoo Jea-sun (KOR)	1	3	4	30:23.0
13	Choi Mi-jung (KOR)	2	3	5	31:51.6
14	Kim Ja-youn (KOR)	4	4	8	32:34.0
