= Biathlon at the 1999 Asian Winter Games – Women's relay =

Women's 4 × 7.5 kilometre relay at the 1999 Asian Winter Games
- Venue: Provincial Nordic Venue
- Dates: 5 February 1999
- Competitors: 12 from 3 nations

Medalists
gold medal	Kazakhstan; Galina Avtayeva, Margarita Dulova, Yelena Dubok, Lyudmila Guryeva
silver medal	China; Yu Shumei, Sun Ribo, Liu Xianying, Kong Yingchao
bronze medal	South Korea; Kim Ja-youn, Kim Mi-young, Yoo Jea-sun, Choi Mi-jung

The women's 4×7.5 kilometre relay at the 1999 Asian Winter Games was held on 5 February 1999 at Yongpyong Cross Country Venue, South Korea.

== Schedule ==
All times are Korea Standard Time (UTC+09:00)

Date	Time	Event
Friday, 5 February 1999	13:00	Final

== Results ==
Rank	Team	Penalties			Time
Rank	Team	P	S	Total	Time
1st place, gold medalist(s)	Kazakhstan (KAZ)	3	3	6	1:50:32.9
	Galina Avtayeva	0	0	0	26:41.9
	Margarita Dulova	0	2	2	27:49.9
	Yelena Dubok	1	1	2	28:52.5
	Lyudmila Guryeva	2	0	2	27:08.6
2nd place, silver medalist(s)	China (CHN)	3	5	8	1:51:00.5
	Yu Shumei	1	0	1	26:14.3
	Sun Ribo	1	2	3	27:59.2
	Liu Xianying	1	3	4	29:26.0
	Kong Yingchao	0	0	0	27:21.0
3rd place, bronze medalist(s)	South Korea (KOR)	5	6	11	2:11:48.6
	Kim Ja-youn	1	1	2	32:36.5
	Kim Mi-young	0	1	1	31:33.2
	Yoo Jea-sun	4	3	7	35:11.0
	Choi Mi-jung	0	1	1	32:27.9
