= Biathlon at the 1999 Asian Winter Games – Men's sprint =

1999 Asian Winter Games event

Men's 10 kilometre sprint at the 1999 Asian Winter Games
- Venue: Provincial Nordic Venue
- Dates: 3 February 1999
- Competitors: 16 from 5 nations

Medalists
gold medal	Zhang Qing	China
silver medal	Dmitriy Pozdnyakov	Kazakhstan
bronze medal	Dmitriy Pantov	Kazakhstan

The men's 10 kilometre sprint at the 1999 Asian Winter Games was held on 3 February 1999 at Yongpyong Cross Country Venue, South Korea.

== Schedule ==
All times are Korea Standard Time (UTC+09:00)

Date	Time	Event
Wednesday, 3 February 1999	10:00	Final

== Results ==
Legend

- DNF — Did not finish

Rank	Athlete	Penalties			Time
Rank	Athlete	P	S	Total	Time
1st place, gold medalist(s)	Zhang Qing (CHN)	0	1	1	30:10.6
2nd place, silver medalist(s)	Dmitriy Pozdnyakov (KAZ)	1	1	2	31:03.5
3rd place, bronze medalist(s)	Dmitriy Pantov (KAZ)	3	2	5	31:16.8
4	Qiu Lianhai (CHN)	1	0	1	31:33.9
5	Shinji Ebisawa (JPN)	1	1	2	31:59.0
6	Shin Byung-kook (KOR)	1	2	3	32:08.8
7	Jeon Jae-won (KOR)	3	2	5	32:14.1
8	Hidenori Isa (JPN)	0	3	3	32:32.6
9	Alexey Karevskiy (KAZ)	4	2	6	33:11.3
10	Son Hae-kwon (KOR)	2	4	6	33:12.8
11	Takashi Shindo (JPN)	2	2	4	33:14.7
12	Naoki Shindo (JPN)	0	3	3	33:15.3
13	Wang Xin (CHN)	1	2	3	33:26.9
14	Mikhail Lepeshkin (KAZ)	3	1	4	33:43.2
15	Byambyn Enkh-Amgalan (MGL)	5	5	10	41:40.3
—	Choi Neung-chul (KOR)				DNF
