= Hungary at the 2002 Winter Olympics =

- IOC code: HUN
- NOC: Hungarian Olympic Committee
- Website: www.olimpia.hu (in Hungarian and English)

in Salt Lake City
- Competitors: 25 (14 men and 11 women) in 7 sports
- Flag bearer: Krisztina Egyed (speed skating)
- Officials: Marianna Nagy; Ádám Kovács
- Medals: Gold 0 Silver 0 Bronze 0 Total 0

Winter Olympics appearances (overview)
- 1924; 1928; 1932; 1936; 1948; 1952; 1956; 1960; 1964; 1968; 1972; 1976; 1980; 1984; 1988; 1992; 1994; 1998; 2002; 2006; 2010; 2014; 2018; 2022; 2026

Hungary competed at the 2002 Winter Olympics in Salt Lake City, United States.

== Alpine skiing ==
Men

Athlete	Event	Race 1	Race 2	Total	
Athlete	Event	Time	Time	Time	Rank
Péter Vincze	Super-G			1:50.40	34
Péter Vincze	Giant Slalom	1:23.99	1:22.74	2:46.73	56
Péter Vincze	Slalom	1:01.46	1:14.11	2:15.57	33

Women

Athlete	Event	Race 1	Race 2	Total	
Athlete	Event	Time	Time	Time	Rank
Márta Vastagh Regős	Giant Slalom	1:27.64	1:24.86	2:52.50	44
Márta Vastagh Regős	Slalom	1:17.66	DNF	DNF	–

== Biathlon ==
Men

Event	Athlete	Misses ^{1}	Time	Rank
10 km sprint	Imre Tagscherer	3	29:08.6	75

Event	Athlete	Time	Misses	Adjusted time ^{3}	Rank
20 km	Imre Tagscherer	56:51.8	3	59:51.8	70

Women

Event	Athlete	Misses ^{1}	Time	Rank
7.5 km sprint	Ivett Szöllősi	4	27:17.6	71
7.5 km sprint	Zsuzsanna Bekecs	1	25:42.1	67

Event	Athlete	Time	Misses	Adjusted time ^{3}	Rank
15 km	Zsuzsanna Bekecs	55:40.7	5	1'00:40.7	65
15 km	Ivett Szöllősi	55:34.8	1	56:34.8	58

^{1} A penalty loop of 150 metres had to be skied per missed target.
^{3} One minute added per missed target.

== Bobsleigh ==
Men

Sled	Athletes	Event	Run 1		Run 2		Run 3		Run 4		Total	
Sled	Athletes	Event	Time	Rank	Time	Rank	Time	Rank	Time	Rank	Time	Rank
HUN-1	Nicholas Frankl; Márton Gyulai; Péter Pallai; Bertalan Pintér; Zsolt Zsombor	Four-man	48.26	27	48.18	27	49.03	25	49.08	25	3:14.55	23

Women

Sled	Athletes	Event	Run 1		Run 2		Total	
Sled	Athletes	Event	Time	Rank	Time	Rank	Time	Rank
HUN-1	Ildikó Strehli; Éva Kürti	Two-woman	49.99	12	49.92	13	1:39.91	13

== Cross-country skiing ==
Men

Sprint

Athlete	Qualifying round		Quarter finals		Semi finals		Finals	
Athlete	Time	Rank	Time	Rank	Time	Rank	Time	Final rank
Matyás Holló	3:15.11	60	did not advance					
Imre Tagscherer	3:05.98	49	did not advance					
Zoltán Tagscherer	3:01.90	40	did not advance					

Pursuit

Athlete	10 km C		10 km F pursuit^{1}	
Athlete	Time	Rank	Time	Final rank
Matyás Holló	33:15.1	75	did not advance	
Imre Tagscherer	33:10.6	74	did not advance	

Event	Athlete	Race	
Event	Athlete	Time	Rank
30 km F	Zoltán Tagscherer	1'30:50.1	66

^{1} Starting delay based on 10 km C. results.
C = Classical style, F = Freestyle

Women

Sprint

Athlete	Qualifying round		Quarter finals		Semi finals		Finals	
Athlete	Time	Rank	Time	Rank	Time	Rank	Time	Final rank
Zsófia Gottschall	3:42.98	54	did not advance					

Pursuit

Athlete	5 km C		5 km F pursuit^{2}	
Athlete	Time	Rank	Time	Final rank
Zsófia Gottschall	17:36.6	70	did not advance	

^{2} Starting delay based on 5 km C. results.
C = Classical style, F = Freestyle

== Figure skating ==
Men

Athlete	Points	SP	FS	Rank
Zoltán Tóth	DNF	25	DNF	–

Women

Athlete	Points	SP	FS	Rank
Júlia Sebestyén	11.0	6	8	8

== Short track speed skating ==
Men

Athlete	Event	Round one		Quarter finals		Semi finals		Finals	
Athlete	Event	Time	Rank	Time	Rank	Time	Rank	Time	Final rank
Krisztián Szabó	500 m	44.143	3	did not advance					
Balázs Knoch	500 m	42.533	3	did not advance					
Balázs Knoch	1000 m	1:31.061	3	did not advance					
Kornél Szántó	1000 m	1:31.391	3	did not advance					
Kornél Szántó	1500 m	2:27.467	4	did not advance					
Balázs Knoch	1500 m	2:40.617	4	did not advance					

Women

Athlete	Event	Round one		Quarter finals		Semi finals		Finals	
Athlete	Event	Time	Rank	Time	Rank	Time	Rank	Time	Final rank
Marianna Nagy	500 m	46.980	4	did not advance					
Szandra Lajtos	500 m	48.488	4	did not advance					
Szandra Lajtos	1000 m	1:40.688	3	did not advance					
Marianna Nagy	1000 m	1:39.648	4	did not advance					
Eva Farkas	1500 m	2:42.172	6	did not advance					
Marianna Nagy	1500 m	2:39.615	5	did not advance					

== Speed skating ==
Men

Event	Athlete	Race 1		Race 2		Total	
Event	Athlete	Time	Rank	Time	Rank	Time	Rank
500 m	Zsolt Baló	36.24	24	36.69	35	72.93	31
1000 m	Zsolt Baló					1:10.57	31
1500 m	Zsolt Baló					1:48.27	30

Women

Event	Athlete	Race 1		Race 2		Total	
Event	Athlete	Time	Rank	Time	Rank	Time	Rank
500 m	Krisztina Egyed	39.47	27	39.81	29	79.28	27
1000 m	Krisztina Egyed					1:17.11	24
1500 m	Krisztina Egyed					1:59.86	23
