= Biathlon at the 2007 Asian Winter Games – Women's sprint =

Women's 7.5 kilometre sprint at the 2007 Asian Winter Games
- Venue: Beida Lake Skiing Resort
- Dates: 29 January 2007
- Competitors: 18 from 6 nations

Medalists
gold medal	Liu Xianying	China
silver medal	Kong Yingchao	China
bronze medal	Dong Xue	China
bronze medal	Tamami Tanaka	Japan

The women's 7.5 kilometre sprint at the 2007 Asian Winter Games was held on 29 January 2007 at Beida Lake Skiing Resort, China.

== Schedule ==
All times are China Standard Time (UTC+08:00)

Date	Time	Event
Monday, 29 January 2007	10:00	Final

== Results ==
Legend

- DNF — Did not finish

Rank	Athlete	Penalties			Time
Rank	Athlete	P	S	Total	Time
1st place, gold medalist(s)	Liu Xianying (CHN)	0	2	2	25:19.2
2nd place, silver medalist(s)	Kong Yingchao (CHN)	0	1	1	25:23.3
3rd place, bronze medalist(s)	Dong Xue (CHN)	2	3	5	26:16.2
3rd place, bronze medalist(s)	Tamami Tanaka (JPN)	2	2	4	27:09.6
5	Viktoriya Afanasyeva (KAZ)	1	4	5	27:21.3
6	Megumi Izumi (JPN)	4	0	4	27:52.3
7	Yin Qiao (CHN)	2	3	5	28:11.9
8	Yelena Khrustaleva (KAZ)	2	3	5	28:17.2
9	Ikuyo Tsukidate (JPN)	3	4	7	28:31.9
10	Chu Kyung-mi (KOR)	1	1	2	28:37.5
11	Megumi Matsuura (JPN)	3	4	7	28:39.4
12	Tatyana Mazunina (KAZ)	1	4	5	28:40.8
13	Kim Seon-su (KOR)	2	1	3	28:42.2
14	Inna Mozhevitina (KAZ)	3	2	5	29:20.4
15	Mun Ji-hee (KOR)	4	3	7	32:21.2
16	Jo In-hee (KOR)	5	3	8	32:25.0
17	Kao Yi-ching (TPE)	3	0	3	46:03.3
—	Shirnengiin Bolortsetseg (MGL)				DNF

- Tamami Tanaka was awarded bronze because of no three-medal sweep per country rule.
