= Biathlon at the 2007 Asian Winter Games – Women's relay =

Women's 4 × 6 kilometre relay at the 2007 Asian Winter Games
- Venue: Beida Lake Skiing Resort
- Dates: 2 February 2007
- Competitors: 16 from 4 nations

Medalists
gold medal	China; Kong Yingchao, Dong Xue, Yin Qiao, Liu Xianying
silver medal	Kazakhstan; Yelena Khrustaleva, Viktoriya Afanasyeva, Olga Dudchenko, Inna Mozhevitina
bronze medal	Japan; Megumi Izumi, Tamami Tanaka, Megumi Matsuura, Ikuyo Tsukidate

The women's 4×6 kilometre relay at the 2007 Asian Winter Games was held on 2 February 2007 at Beida Lake Skiing Resort, China.

== Schedule ==
All times are China Standard Time (UTC+08:00)

Date	Time	Event
Friday, 2 February 2007	10:00	Final

== Results ==
Rank	Team	Penalties			Time
Rank	Team	P	S	Total	Time
1st place, gold medalist(s)	China (CHN)	2+7	0+8	2+15	1:29:03.1
	Kong Yingchao	0+0	0+3	0+3	21:11.9
	Dong Xue	0+3	0+3	0+6	22:34.5
	Yin Qiao	0+1	0+2	0+3	21:50.8
	Liu Xianying	2+3	0+0	2+3	23:25.9
2nd place, silver medalist(s)	Kazakhstan (KAZ)	1+9	3+7	4+16	1:32:26.0
	Yelena Khrustaleva	0+2	1+3	1+5	22:53.6
	Viktoriya Afanasyeva	1+3	2+3	3+6	24:00.3
	Olga Dudchenko	0+2	0+0	0+2	23:05.5
	Inna Mozhevitina	0+2	0+1	0+3	22:26.6
3rd place, bronze medalist(s)	Japan (JPN)	6+10	3+8	9+18	1:34:51.3
	Megumi Izumi	1+3	0+2	1+5	24:29.4
	Tamami Tanaka	1+3	3+3	4+6	25:06.0
	Megumi Matsuura	0+1	0+2	0+3	21:50.6
	Ikuyo Tsukidate	4+3	0+1	4+4	23:25.3
4	South Korea (KOR)	6+11	2+7	8+18	1:41:51.3
	Kim Seon-su	0+2	0+2	0+4	23:55.1
	Chu Kyung-mi	1+3	0+0	1+3	24:52.9
	Mun Ji-hee	0+3	2+3	2+6	25:23.3
	Jo In-hee	5+3	0+2	5+5	27:40.0
