= Biathlon at the 2007 Asian Winter Games – Women's individual =

Women's 15 kilometre individual at the 2007 Asian Winter Games
- Venue: Beida Lake Skiing Resort
- Dates: 1 February 2007
- Competitors: 16 from 4 nations

Medalists
gold medal	Liu Xianying	China
silver medal	Kong Yingchao	China
bronze medal	Inna Mozhevitina	Kazakhstan

The women's 15 kilometre individual at the 2007 Asian Winter Games was held on 1 February 2007 at Beida Lake Skiing Resort, China.

== Schedule ==
All times are China Standard Time (UTC+08:00)

Date	Time	Event
Thursday, 1 February 2007	10:00	Final

== Results ==
Legend

- DNS — Did not start

Rank	Athlete	Ski time	Penalties					Time
Rank	Athlete	Ski time	P	S	P	S	Total	Time
1st place, gold medalist(s)	Liu Xianying (CHN)	54:27.6	0	1	0	1	2	56:27.6
2nd place, silver medalist(s)	Kong Yingchao (CHN)	54:34.5	1	1	0	1	3	57:34.5
3rd place, bronze medalist(s)	Inna Mozhevitina (KAZ)	58:08.6	1	0	0	1	2	1:00:08.6
4	Yelena Khrustaleva (KAZ)	57:13.0	1	0	1	1	3	1:00:13.0
5	Dong Xue (CHN)	54:44.7	1	3	2	0	6	1:00:44.7
6	Viktoriya Afanasyeva (KAZ)	57:00.8	1	1	1	1	4	1:01:00.8
7	Megumi Izumi (JPN)	58:32.4	1	1	0	2	4	1:02:32.4
8	Olga Dudchenko (KAZ)	1:02:32.5	0	0	0	1	1	1:03:32.5
9	Megumi Matsuura (JPN)	56:38.6	1	1	3	2	7	1:03:38.6
10	Ikuyo Tsukidate (JPN)	56:12.4	2	0	4	3	9	1:05:12.4
11	Kim Seon-su (KOR)	1:00:15.9	0	1	2	2	5	1:05:15.9
12	Tamami Tanaka (JPN)	56:17.8	1	3	2	4	10	1:06:17.8
13	Chu Kyung-mi (KOR)	1:01:49.1	2	2	2	0	6	1:07:49.1
14	Jo In-hee (KOR)	1:05:57.9	3	1	2	2	8	1:13:57.9
15	Kim Mi-seon (KOR)	1:06:25.0	4	3	2	3	12	1:18:25.0
—	Yin Qiao (CHN)							DNS
