= Biathlon at the 1999 Asian Winter Games – Men's relay =

Men's 4 × 7.5 kilometre relay at the 1999 Asian Winter Games
- Venue: Provincial Nordic Venue
- Dates: 5 February 1999
- Competitors: 12 from 3 nations

Medalists
gold medal	Kazakhstan; Alexey Karevskiy, Sergey Abdukarov, Dmitriy Pantov, Dmitriy Pozdnyakov
silver medal	Japan; Takashi Shindo, Shinji Ebisawa, Hideki Yamamoto, Hidenori Isa
bronze medal	South Korea; Son Hae-kwon, Shin Byung-kook, Choi Neung-chul, Jeon Jae-won

The men's 4×7.5 kilometre relay at the 1999 Asian Winter Games was held on 5 February 1999 at Yongpyong Cross Country Venue, South Korea.

== Schedule ==
All times are Korea Standard Time (UTC+09:00)

Date	Time	Event
Friday, 5 February 1999	10:00	Final

== Results ==
Rank	Team	Penalties			Time
Rank	Team	P	S	Total	Time
1st place, gold medalist(s)	Kazakhstan (KAZ)	13	2	15	1:38:15.3
	Alexey Karevskiy	3	2	5	26:15.1
	Sergey Abdukarov	5	0	5	25:43.3
	Dmitriy Pantov	5	0	5	24:16.7
	Dmitriy Pozdnyakov	0	0	0	22:00.2
2nd place, silver medalist(s)	Japan (JPN)	10	5	15	1:41:45.1
	Takashi Shindo	0	1	1	24:08.1
	Shinji Ebisawa	3	1	4	26:04.2
	Hideki Yamamoto	2	0	2	23:54.8
	Hidenori Isa	5	3	8	27:38.0
3rd place, bronze medalist(s)	South Korea (KOR)	6	6	12	1:42:42.8
	Son Hae-kwon	0	0	0	23:43.7
	Shin Byung-kook	2	2	4	26:01.9
	Choi Neung-chul	1	2	3	27:32.8
	Jeon Jae-won	3	2	5	25:24.4
