= Biathlon at the 1999 Asian Winter Games – Men's individual =

Men's 20 kilometre individual at the 1999 Asian Winter Games
- Venue: Provincial Nordic Venue
- Dates: 1 February 1999
- Competitors: 16 from 5 nations

Medalists
gold medal	Zhang Qing	China
silver medal	Dmitriy Pozdnyakov	Kazakhstan
bronze medal	Dmitriy Pantov	Kazakhstan

The men's 20 kilometre individual at the 1999 Asian Winter Games was held on 1 February 1999 at Yongpyong Cross Country Venue, South Korea.

== Schedule ==
All times are Korea Standard Time (UTC+09:00)

Date	Time	Event
Monday, 1 February 1999	10:00	Final

== Results ==
Rank	Athlete	Ski time	Penalties					Time
Rank	Athlete	Ski time	P	S	P	S	Total	Time
1st place, gold medalist(s)	Zhang Qing (CHN)	59:53.2	1	1	0	1	3	1:02:53.2
2nd place, silver medalist(s)	Dmitriy Pozdnyakov (KAZ)	1:01:01.0	0	2	0	0	2	1:03:01.0
3rd place, bronze medalist(s)	Dmitriy Pantov (KAZ)	59:24.8	1	2	0	1	4	1:03:24.8
4	Hideki Yamamoto (JPN)	1:02:55.5	0	1	3	0	4	1:06:55.5
5	Qiu Lianhai (CHN)	1:03:18.9	1	1	0	2	4	1:07:18.9
6	Shin Byung-kook (KOR)	1:02:49.3	1	2	1	1	5	1:07:49.3
7	Son Hae-kwon (KOR)	1:02:58.3	1	1	2	1	5	1:07:58.3
8	Wang Xin (CHN)	1:04:42.4	2	1	1	1	5	1:09:42.4
9	Naoki Shindo (JPN)	1:03:08.5	3	1	0	3	7	1:10:08.5
9	Jeon Jae-won (KOR)	1:02:08.5	2	2	2	2	8	1:10:08.5
11	Alexey Karevskiy (KAZ)	1:03:28.8	3	1	1	2	7	1:10:28.8
12	Sergey Abdukarov (KAZ)	1:05:11.4	1	2	1	3	7	1:12:11.4
13	Takashi Shindo (JPN)	1:01:15.0	3	3	2	4	12	1:13:15.0
14	Shinji Ebisawa (JPN)	1:04:13.6	3	3	1	3	10	1:14:13.6
15	Choi Neung-chul (KOR)	1:08:50.6	3	2	0	1	6	1:14:50.6
16	Byambyn Enkh-Amgalan (MGL)	1:15:20.4	4	5	2	2	13	1:28:20.4
