= Biathlon at the 1996 Asian Winter Games =

- Venue: Yabuli Ski Resort

Biathlon at the 1996 Asian Winter Games took place in the city of Harbin, China with six events contested — three for men and three for women. The women's biathlon events were introduced in this edition of the Winter Asiad.

== Medalists ==
=== Men ===
Event	Gold	Silver	Bronze
10 km sprint	Dmitriy Pantov; Kazakhstan	Valeriy Ivanov; Kazakhstan	Tan Hongbin; China
20 km individual	Valeriy Ivanov; Kazakhstan	Mikhail Lepeshkin; Kazakhstan	Dmitriy Pantov; Kazakhstan
4 × 7.5 km relay	Kazakhstan; Sergey Abdukarov; Valeriy Ivanov; Mikhail Lepeshkin; Dmitriy Pantov	Japan	China; Lu Liang; Song Libin; Su Peishan; Tan Hongbin

=== Women ===
Event	Gold	Silver	Bronze
7.5 km sprint	Inna Sheshkil; Kazakhstan	Wang Jinfen; China	Yu Shumei; China
15 km individual	Inna Sheshkil; Kazakhstan	Margarita Dulova; Kazakhstan	Yu Shumei; China
4 × 7.5 km relay	China; Liu Jinfeng; Song Aiqin; Wang Jinfen; Yu Shumei	Kazakhstan	None awarded

== Medal table ==
Rank	Nation	Gold	Silver	Bronze	Total
1	Kazakhstan (KAZ)	5	4	1	10
2	China (CHN)	1	1	4	6
3	Japan (JPN)	0	1	0	1
Totals (3 entries)		6	6	5	17
