= Lepyoshkin =

Lepyoshkin or Lepeshkin is a male Slavic surname, its feminine counterpart is Lepyoshkina or Lepeshkina. Notable people with the surname include:

- Anatoly Lepyoshkin (born 1938), Russian speedskater
- Mikhail Lepeshkin, Kazakhstan biathlete
