= Szollosi =

Szollosi, Szőllősi or Szöllősi is a Hungarian surname. Notable people with the surname include:

- Balázs Szöllősi (born 1992), Hungarian handballer
- Ilona Szöllősi (1908–??), Hungarian gymnast, competitor in the 1928 Summer Olympics
- Imre Szöllősi (1941–2022), Hungarian sprint canoeist
- Ivett Szöllősi (born 1982), Hungarian biathlete
- Matt Szollosi (born 1972), American politician
- Szabolcs Szöllősi (born 1989), Hungarian handballer
- Szabolcs Szőllősi (born 1986), Hungarian speed skater
- Szandra Szöllősi-Zácsik (born 1990), Hungarian handballer
