= Valery Ivanov (disambiguation) =

Valery Ivanov was a Soviet diplomat and alleged spy.

Valery Ivanov may also refer to:

- Valērijs Ivanovs (born 1970), Latvian footballer
- Valeriy Ivanov (biathlete) (born 1969), Kazakhstani biathlete
- Valery Ivanov (philologist) (1924–2005), Soviet and Russian philologist and linguist
