= Marianna Nagy =

Marianna Nagy may refer to:

- Marianna Nagy (figure skater) (1929–2011), Hungarian pair skater
- Marianna Nagy (handballer) (born 1957), Hungarian Olympic handball player
- Marianna Nagy (speed skater) (born 1984), Hungarian Olympic speed skater
