= Aleksandr Menshchikov =

Aleksandr Menshchikov may refer to:

- Aleksandr Menshchikov (wrestler)
- Aleksandr Menshchikov (biathlete)
