= Célia Bourgeois =

French cross-country skier (born 1983)

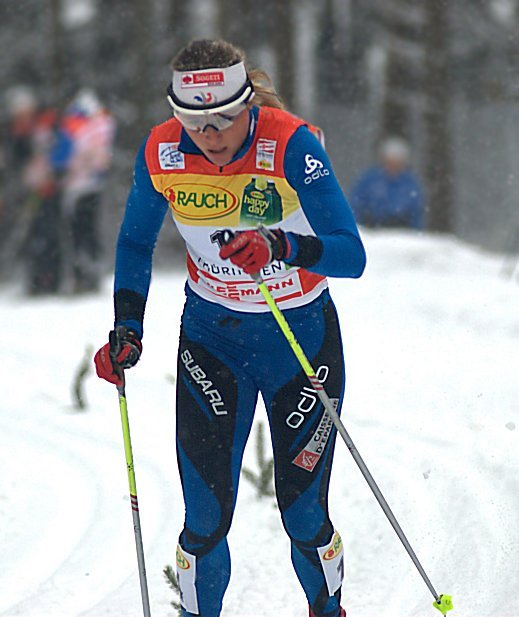
- Célia Bourgeois in 2010

Personal information
- Nationality: France
- Born: 9 June 1983 (age 43) Champagnole, France

Sport
- Sport: Skiing
- Club: GUC Grenoble

World Cup career
- Seasons: 4 – (2008–2011)
- Indiv. starts: 35
- Indiv. podiums: 0
- Team starts: 7
- Team podiums: 0
- Overall titles: 0 – (66th in 2011)
- Discipline titles: 0
Medal record
Women's biathlon
Representing France
Junior World Championships
Bronze medal – third place	2004 Haute Maurienne	3 × 6 km relay

Célia Bourgeois (born 9 June 1983) is a French cross-country skier who has competed since 2008. At the 2010 Winter Olympics in Vancouver, she finished sixth in the 4 × 5 km relay and 48th in the 10 km event.

At the FIS Nordic World Ski Championships 2009 in Liberec, Bourgeois finished ninth in the 4 × 5 km relay and 28th in the 30 km event.

Her best World Cup finish was eighth in the 4 × 5 km relay twice, both in 2008, while her best individual finish was 21st at a 10 km event in Canada in February 2010.

== Cross-country skiing results ==
All results are sourced from the International Ski Federation (FIS).

=== Olympic Games ===
Year	Age	10 km individual	15 km skiathlon	30 km mass start	Sprint	4 × 5 km relay	Team sprint
2010	26	47	—	—	—	6	—

=== World Championships ===
Year	Age	10 km individual	15 km skiathlon	30 km mass start	Sprint	4 × 5 km relay	Team sprint
2009	25	—	—	27	—	8	—
2011	27	—	48	48	—	13	—

=== World Cup ===
==== Season standings ====
Season	Age	Discipline standings			Ski Tour standings		
Season	Age	Overall	Distance	Sprint	Nordic Opening	Tour de Ski	World Cup Final
2008	24	101	69	—	—N/a	—	—
2009	25	98	69	NC	—N/a	—	44
2010	26	92	66	NC	—N/a	34	—
2011	27	66	50	NC	—	28	—
