= Biathlon Junior World Championships 2004 =

Biathlon event in France

The 2004 Biathlon Junior World Championships was held in Haute Maurienne Vanoise, France from January 25 to January 31 2004. There was to be a total of 16 competitions: sprint, pursuit, individual, mass start, and relay races for men and women.

== Medal winners ==
=== Youth Women ===
Event:	Gold:	Time	Silver:	Time	Bronze:	Time
10 km individual details	Marion Blondeau; France	37:09.4 (0+0+0+0)	Sirli Hanni; Estonia	37:40.8 (0+0+1+0)	Inna Mozhevitina; Kazakhstan	38:46.4 (1+2+0+1)
6 km sprint details	Michaela Balatková; Czech Republic	22:51.5 (0+3)	Marion Blondeau; France	22:54.0 (1+2)	Inna Mozhevitina; Kazakhstan	23:06.3 (1+4)
7.5 km pursuit details	Inna Mozhevitina; Kazakhstan	28:18.5 (0+0+1+0)	Michaela Balatková; Czech Republic	30:55.6 (2+1+0+2)	Marion Blondeau; France	31:27.1 (2+0+2+1)
3 × 6 km relay details	France; Marie Dorin; Marion Blondeau; Melanie Vincent-Droz	1:07:19.4 (0+0) (0+1) (1+3) (0+2) (0+2) (0+1)	Norway; Anne Marit Gjermundshaug; Stine Øvreberg; Birgitte Røksund	1:07:50.6 (0+3) (0+3) (0+0) (0+0) (0+0) (0+1)	Slovakia; Viktória Groneová; Eliska Svikruhová; Bibiana Svejkovská	1:10:08.9 (0+3) (0+2) (0+3) (1+3) (0+0) (0+2)

=== Junior Women ===
Event:	Gold:	Time	Silver:	Time	Bronze:	Time
12.5 km individual details	Jenny Adler; Germany	47:12.5 (1+1+1+1)	Hanna Möller; Germany	48:19.9 (0+0+0+3)	Uliana Denisova; Russia	48:25.3 (1+1+0+2)
7.5 km sprint details	Magdalena Neuner; Germany	23:03.9 (0+2)	Kathrin Hitzer; Germany	23:44.1 (1+0)	Pauline Jacquin; France	23:45.7 (0+0)
10 km pursuit details	Jenny Adler; Germany	35:44.3 (0+0+0+0)	Magdalena Neuner; Germany	35:54.0 (1+0+1+3)	Uliana Denisova; Russia	35:56.2 (0+1+2+0)
3 × 6 km relay details	Germany; Jenny Adler; Magdalena Neuner; Anne Preußler	1:00:44.4 (0+0) (0+1) (0+0) (0+3) (0+1) (0+0)	Russia; Uliana Denisova; Ekaterina Iourieva; Anastasiya Shipulina	1:03:35.4 (0+0) (1+3) (0+0) (0+1) (2+3) (0+0)	France; Célia Bourgeois; Anne Lise Bailly; Pauline Jacquin	1:04:15.1 (0+2) (1+3) (0+2) (1+3) (0+0) (0+0)

=== Youth Men ===
Event:	Gold:	Time	Silver:	Time	Bronze:	Time
12.5 km individual details	Pavel Borisov; Russia	40:22.6 (1+1+0+0)	Peter Dokl; Slovenia	35:29.6 (0+0+0+2)	Klemen Bauer; Slovenia	40:23.3 (1+1+0+1)
7.5 km sprint details	Jean-Philippe Leguellec; Canada	22:09.4 (1+0)	Klemen Bauer; Slovenia	22:44.5 (1+2)	Stian Navik; Norway	22:47.2 (1+0)
10 km pursuit details	Emil Hegle Svendsen; Norway	33:53.7 (1+1+1+2)	Jean-Philippe Leguellec; Canada	34:00.1 (3+0+3+0)	Stian Navik; Norway	34:04.5 (1+1+0+1)
3 × 7.5 km relay details	Norway; Ronny Hafsås; Stian Navik; Emil Hegle Svendsen	1:06:42.4 (0+3) (2+3) (0+1) (0+3) (0+1) (0+3)	Canada; Jean-Philippe Leguellec; Marc-André Bédard; François Leboeuf	1:07:24.5 (0+0) (0+0) (0+1) (0+3) (0+0) (0+3)	Slovenia; Peter Dokl; Andraz Semrov; Klemen Bauer	1:07:36.7 (0+1) (0+2) (0+2) (1+3) (0+2) (3+3)

=== Junior Men ===
Event:	Gold:	Time	Silver:	Time	Bronze:	Time
15 km individual details	Hansjörg Reuter; Germany	48:43.6 (0+1+0+2)	Simon Fourcade; France	49:05.0 (1+1+1+0)	Oleh Berezhnyi; Ukraine	49:21.9 (0+0+1+0)
10 km sprint details	Simon Fourcade; France	26:57.1 (0+0)	Michael Rösch; Germany	27:16.8 (1+1)	Simon Eder; Austria	27:25.9 (1+0)
12.5 km pursuit details	Simon Fourcade; France	37:21.3 (1+0+0+0)	Michael Rösch; Germany	38:09.4 (0+0+3+1)	Serhiy Sednev; Ukraine	38:39.6 (0+1+0+0)
4 × 7.5 km relay details	Germany; Hansjörg Reuter; Christoph Knie; Steve Renner; Michael Rösch	1:24:48.1 (0+3) (0+2) (0+2) (0+0) (0+0) (0+0) (1+3) (1+2)	Czech Republic; Milan Faltus; Ondřej Moravec; Miroslav Tomeš; Michal Šlesingr	1:25:29.7 (1+3) (0+1) (0+1) (0+0) (0+0) (0+1) (0+1) (0+0)	Russia; Alexandre Kudryashev; Vladimir Shemelov; Artem Ushakov; Vladimir Moiseev	1:27:52.1 (0+0) (0+1) (0+2) (0+1) (0+1) (1+3) (0+1) (0+0)

== Medal table ==
* Host nation (France)

Rank	Nation	Gold	Silver	Bronze	Total
1	Germany (GER)	6	5	0	11
2	France (FRA)*	4	2	3	9
3	Norway (NOR)	2	1	2	5
4	Canada (CAN)	1	2	0	3
4	Czech Republic (CZE)	1	2	0	3
6	Russia (RUS)	1	1	3	5
7	Kazakhstan (KAZ)	1	0	2	3
8	Slovenia (SLO)	0	2	2	4
9	Estonia (EST)	0	1	0	1
10	Ukraine (UKR)	0	0	2	2
11	Austria (AUT)	0	0	1	1
11	Slovakia (SVK)	0	0	1	1
Totals (12 entries)		16	16	16	48
