= Liu Hongwang =

Personal information
- Nationality: Chinese
- Born: 13 February 1962 (age 64)

Sport
- Sport: Biathlon
Medal record
Representing China
Asian Winter Games
Silver medal – second place	1986 Sapporo	Sprint
Silver medal – second place	1986 Sapporo	Relay
Bronze medal – third place	1986 Sapporo	Individual

Liu Hongwang (born 13 February 1962) is a Chinese biathlete. He competed in the 20 km individual event at the 1984 Winter Olympics.

He also participated at the 1986 Asian Winter Games and won 3 medals.
