= Yoon Hee-joon =

South Korean speed skater

Personal information
- Born: January 1985 (age 41)

Korean name
- Hangul: 윤희준
- RR: Yun Huijun
- MR: Yun Hŭijun

Sport
- Country: South Korea
- Sport: Speed skating

Yoon Hee-joon (Korean: 윤희준; born January 1985), also spelled Yoon Hee-jeun or Yun Hyi-jun, is a South Korean former long track speed skater, who was active between 1997 and 2002.

Yoon represented her nation at international competitions. As a junior she participated at three World Junior Speed Skating Championships. At elite level she competed at the 2001 Asian Speed Skating Championships and the 2003 Asian Winter Games. Between 2001 and 2003 she had a total of three starts at national championships. She never became national champion, but won the silver medal at the 2001 and 2002 South Korean Allround Championships and two bronze medals at the 2003 South Korean Single Distance Championships.

== Records ==
=== Personal records ===
Personal records
Women's speed skating
Event	Result	Date	Location	Notes
500 m	40,99	22.10.2001	Calgary	
1000 m	1.21,27	20.11.1999	Calgary	
1500 m	2.04,92	28.10.2001	Calgary	
3000 m	4.22,68	20.11.1999	Calgary	
5000 m	7.49,18	03.12.2000	Harbin	
