= Balázs Knoch =

Hungarian speed skater

Personal information
- Nationality: Hungarian
- Born: 18 August 1979 (age 45); Pécs, Hungary

Sport
- Sport: Short track speed skating

Balázs Knoch (born 18 August 1979) is a Hungarian short track speed skater. He competed in three events at the 2002 Winter Olympics.
