= Vitaly Lilichenko =

Kazakhstani cross-country skier (born 1976)

Personal information
- Nationality: Kazakhstani
- Born: 13 February 1976 (age 50) Moldovan SSR, Soviet Union

Sport
- Sport: Cross-country skiing

Vitaly Lilichenko (Виталий Дмитриевич Лиличенко, born 13 February 1976) is a Kazakhstani cross-country skier. He competed in the men's 10 kilometre classical event at the 1998 Winter Olympics.
