= Biathlon at the 2011 Asian Winter Games – Women's relay =

Women's 4 × 6 kilometre relay at the 2011 Asian Winter Games
- Venue: Biathlon and Cross-Country Ski Complex
- Dates: 5 February 2011
- Competitors: 16 from 4 nations

Medalists
gold medal	Kazakhstan; Marina Lebedeva, Olga Poltoranina, Inna Mozhevitina, Yelena Khrustaleva
silver medal	China; Wang Chunli, Tang Jialin, Xu Yinghui, Liu Yuanyuan
bronze medal	Japan; Fuyuko Suzuki, Itsuka Owada, Ayako Mukai, Natsuko Abe

The women's 4×6 kilometre relay at the 2011 Asian Winter Games was held on February 5, 2011 at Biathlon and Cross-Country Ski Complex, Almaty.

== Schedule ==
All times are Almaty Time (UTC+06:00)

Date	Time	Event
Saturday, 5 February 2011	10:00	Final

== Results ==
Rank	Team	Penalties			Time
Rank	Team	P	S	Total	Time
1st place, gold medalist(s)	Kazakhstan (KAZ)	0+2	1+6	1+8	1:25:17.0
	Marina Lebedeva	0+0	0+3	0+3	20:42.5
	Olga Poltoranina	0+1	0+0	0+1	20:42.1
	Inna Mozhevitina	0+1	1+3	1+4	21:47.8
	Yelena Khrustaleva	0+0	0+0	0+0	22:04.6
2nd place, silver medalist(s)	China (CHN)	1+3	5+9	6+12	1:29:11.2
	Wang Chunli	0+0	0+2	0+2	21:06.8
	Tang Jialin	0+0	2+3	2+3	22:38.0
	Xu Yinghui	0+0	0+1	0+1	20:58.8
	Liu Yuanyuan	1+3	3+3	4+6	24:27.6
3rd place, bronze medalist(s)	Japan (JPN)	0+7	2+6	2+13	1:29:37.7
	Fuyuko Suzuki	0+3	0+0	0+3	21:35.9
	Itsuka Owada	0+0	0+0	0+0	21:17.7
	Ayako Mukai	0+3	1+3	1+6	23:34.3
	Natsuko Abe	0+1	1+3	1+4	23:09.8
4	South Korea (KOR)	1+8	0+9	1+17	1:35:19.5
	Chu Kyung-mi	0+1	0+1	0+2	22:47.2
	Mun Ji-hee	0+1	0+3	0+4	21:34.3
	Kim Seo-ra	0+3	0+2	0+5	25:33.2
	Kim Kyung-nam	1+3	0+3	1+6	25:24.8
