= Sergey Kaznacheyev =

Kazakhstani speed skater (born 1974)

Personal information
- Nationality: Kazakhstani
- Born: 14 December 1974 (age 51)

Sport
- Sport: Speed skating

Sergey Kaznacheyev (Сергей Александрович Казначеев, born 14 December 1974) is a Kazakhstani speed skater. He competed in two events at the 1998 Winter Olympics.
