= Biathlon at the 1990 Asian Winter Games =

- Venue: Makomanai Park
- Dates: 10–13 March 1990

Biathlon at the 1990 Asian Winter Games took place in the city of Sapporo, Japan with three events contested — all of them men's events. The competition took place from 10 March to 13 March 1990 at the Makomanai Park.

China finished first in medal table with two gold medals.

== Medalists ==
Event	Gold	Silver	Bronze
10 km sprint	Wang Weiyi; China	Misao Kodate; Japan	Atsushi Kazama; Japan
20 km individual	Song Wenbin; China	Akihiro Takizawa; Japan	Wang Weiyi; China
4 × 7.5 km relay	Japan	China	South Korea; Kim Yong-woon; Kim Sang-wook; Shin Young-sun; Kim Woon-ki

== Medal table ==
Rank	Nation	Gold	Silver	Bronze	Total
1	China (CHN)	2	1	1	4
2	Japan (JPN)	1	2	1	4
3	South Korea (KOR)	0	0	1	1
Totals (3 entries)		3	3	3	9
