= Biathlon at the 1986 Asian Winter Games =

- Venue: Makomanai Park
- Dates: 3–7 March 1986

Biathlon at the 1986 Asian Winter Games took place in the city of Sapporo, Japan from 3 to 7 March 1986 in Makomanai Park with three events contested — all of them men's events.

The host nation Japan dominated the event by winning all gold medals, China finished second, South Korea third.

== Medalists ==
Event	Gold	Silver	Bronze
10 km sprint	Koichi Sato; Japan	Liu Hongwang; China	Isao Yamase; Japan
20 km individual	Isao Yamase; Japan	Koichi Sato; Japan	Liu Hongwang; China
4 × 7.5 km relay	Japan; Isao Yamase; Koichi Sato; Hirohide Sato; Tadashi Nakamura	China	South Korea; Kang Tae-soo; Hong Byung-sik; Joung Young-suk; Hwang Byung-dae

== Medal table ==
Rank	Nation	Gold	Silver	Bronze	Total
1	Japan (JPN)	3	1	1	5
2	China (CHN)	0	2	1	3
3	South Korea (KOR)	0	0	1	1
Totals (3 entries)		3	3	3	9
