= Márta Vastagh Regős =

Hungarian alpine skier (born 1981)

Personal information
- Nationality: Hungarian
- Born: 22 October 1981 (age 43); Miskolc, Hungary

Sport
- Sport: Alpine skiing

Márta Vastagh Regős (born 22 October 1981) is a Hungarian alpine skier. She competed in two events at the 2002 Winter Olympics.
