= Péter Vincze (alpine skier) =

Hungarian alpine skier (born 1975)

Personal information
- Nationality: Hungarian
- Born: 23 November 1975 (age 49); Budapest, Hungary

Sport
- Sport: Alpine skiing

Péter Vincze (born 23 November 1975) is a Hungarian alpine skier. He competed in three events at the 2002 Winter Olympics.
