= Liu Jinfeng =

Chinese biathlete

Personal information
- Nationality: Chinese
- Born: 3 July 1977 (age 49)

Sport
- Sport: Biathlon
Medal record
Representing China
Asian Winter Games
Gold medal – first place	1996 Harbin	Relay

Liu Jinfeng (born 3 July 1977) is a Chinese biathlete. She competed in the women's relay event at the 1998 Winter Olympics.

She also participated at the 1996 Asian Winter Games and won the gold medal in relay event.
