= Isao Yamase =

Japanese biathlete (born 1954)

Personal information
- Nationality: Japanese
- Born: 16 December 1954 (age 70); Hokkaido, Japan

Sport
- Sport: Biathlon

Isao Yamase (born 16 December 1954) is a Japanese biathlete. He competed in the 20 km individual event at the 1984 Winter Olympics.
