= Hidenori Isa =

Japanese biathlete (born 1976)

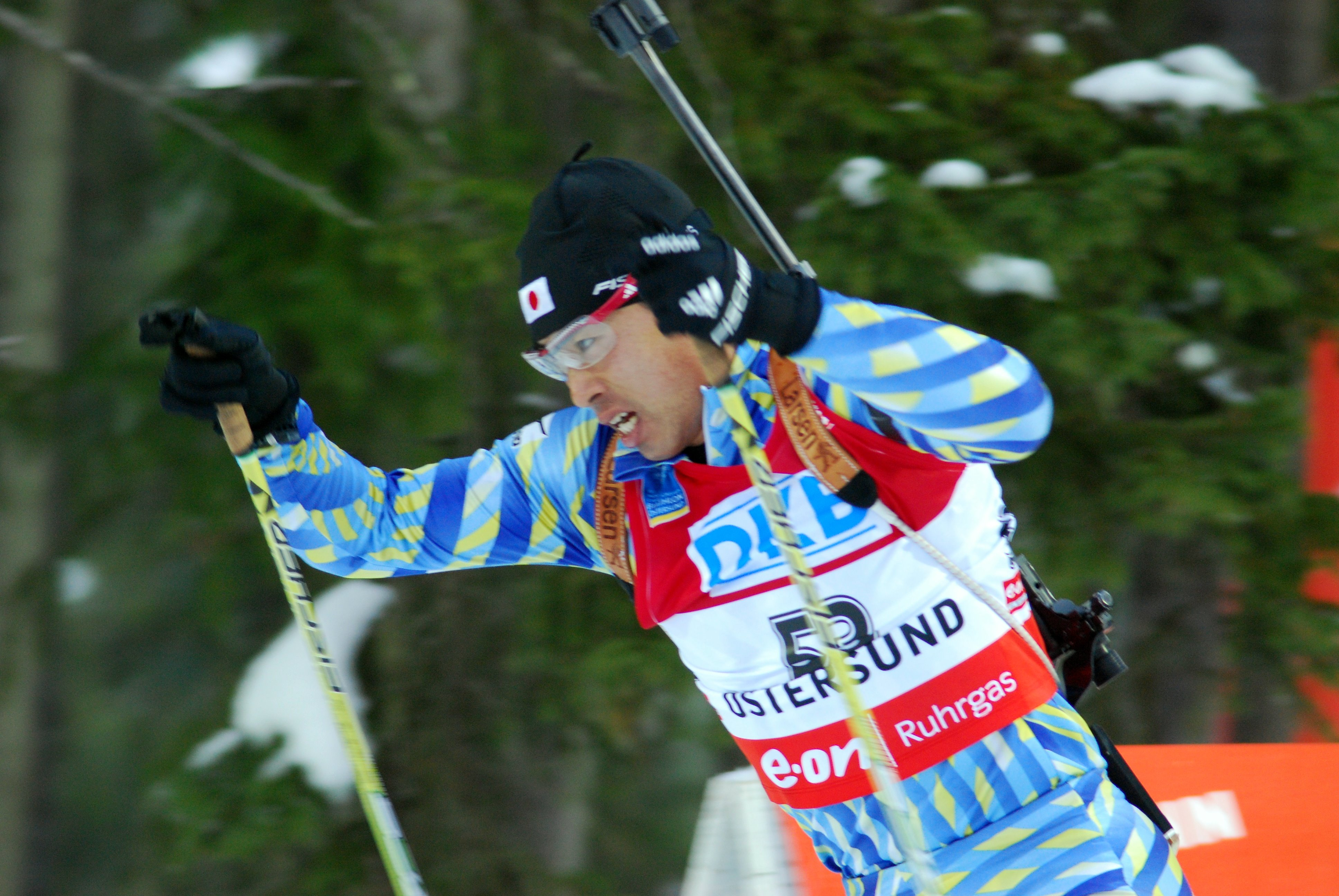
- Isa during the 2008 World Championships.

Personal information
- Born: 30 July 1976 (age 49) Ojiya, Japan
- Height: 1.70 m (5 ft 7 in)

Sport

Professional information
- Sport: Biathlon
- World Cup debut: 30 November 2000
- Retired: 15 February 2014

Olympic Games
- Teams: 4 (2002, 2006, 2010, 2014)
- Medals: 0

World Championships
- Teams: 11 (2001, 2003, 2004, 2005, 2006, 2007, 2008, 2009, 2011, 2012, 2013)
- Medals: 0

World Cup
- Seasons: 14 (2000/01–2013/14)
- All podiums: 0
Medal record
Men's biathlon
Representing Japan
Asian Games
Gold medal – first place	2007 Changchun	10 km sprint
Silver medal – second place	1999 Changchun	4 × 7.5 km relay
Silver medal – second place	2007 Changchun	4 × 7.5 km relay
Silver medal – second place	2011 Astana-Almaty	4 × 7.5 km relay
Bronze medal – third place	2007 Changchun	20 km individual

Hidenori Isa (井佐 英徳, Isa Hidenori; born 30 July 1976) is a former Japanese biathlete. He was one of the top male Japanese biathletes from 2000 until his retirement in 2014.

== Career ==
Born in the city of Ojiya in the Niigata Prefecture, Isa found biathlon after graduating high school and joining the military. Isa debuted in the World Cup in first round of the 2000–01 World Cup in Antholz-Anterselva, Italy. That season Isa made his debut at the World Championships at the World Championships in Pokljuka. He also participated in all World Championships from 2003 to 2009, and then all three World Championships from 2011 to 2013 for Japan. Isa participated in his first Olympics in 2002 and he also participated in the Olympics in 2006, 2010 and 2014. His best individual finish at the Olympics came in the 12.5 km pursuit in 2006, he finished 35th. His best relay finish also came in 2006, a 12th place. His best individual finish at the World Championships came in 2005 in Hochfilzen, where Isa finished 25th in the pursuit. His best relay finish at the World Championships was an 11th which came in 2001 in Pokljuka.

Through his career, Isa never finished on the podium, but he once finished in the top ten individually. It, a 10th place, came in Pokljuka in the third round of the 2009–10 season. Isa's best relay finish in the World Cup was an 8th in Ruhpolding in 2004. His best overall finish came in the 2001–02 World Cup where he finished 46th.

After the 20 km individual race at the 2014 Olympics, Isa announced his retirement from the sport.

== Biathlon results ==
All results are sourced from the International Biathlon Union.

=== Olympic Games ===
Event	Individual	Sprint	Pursuit	Mass start	Relay	Mixed relay
(United States) 2002 Salt Lake City	44th	62nd	—	—N/a	13th	—N/a
(Italy) 2006 Turin	63rd	38th	35th	—	12th	—N/a
(Canada) 2010 Vancouver	83rd	68th	—	—	—	—N/a
(Russia) 2014 Sochi	83rd	70th	—	—	—	—

*Mass start was added as an event in 2006, with the mixed relay being added in 2014.

=== World Championships ===
Event	Individual	Sprint	Pursuit	Mass start	Relay	Mixed relay
(Slovenia) 2001 Pokljuka	46th	37th	38th	—	11th	—N/a
(Russia) 2003 Khanty-Mansiysk	63rd	54th	49th	—	16th	—N/a
(Germany) 2004 Oberhof	67th	54th	42nd	—	17th	—N/a
(Austria) 2005 Hochfilzen	48th	34th	25th	—	13th	18th
(Slovenia) 2006 Pokljuka	—N/a	—N/a	—N/a	—N/a	—N/a	22nd
(Italy) 2007 Antholz-Anterselva	87th	—	—	—	—	20th
(Sweden) 2008 Östersund	66th	53rd	40th	—	—	18th
(South Korea) 2009 Pyeongchang	86th	62nd	—	—	18th	20th
(Russia) 2011 Khanty-Mansiysk	37th	54th	57th	—	20th	—
(Germany) 2012 Ruhpolding	30th	56th	55th	—	23rd	—
(Czech Republic) 2013 Nové Město	106th	55th	44th	—	25th	21st

*During Olympic seasons competitions are only held for those events not included in the Olympic program.
**Mixed relay was added as an event in 2005.
