= Aleksandr Menshchikov (biathlete) =

Kazakhstani biathlete

Personal information
- Nationality: Kazakhstani
- Born: 17 January 1974 (age 52) Kokshelanskaya, Kazakh SSR, Soviet Union

Sport
- Sport: Biathlon

Aleksandr Menshchikov (Александр Владимирович Меньщиков, born 17 January 1974) is a Kazakhstani biathlete. He competed in the men's relay event at the 1998 Winter Olympics.
