= Marianna Nagy (speed skater) =

Hungarian speed skater (born 1984)

Personal information
- Nationality: Hungarian
- Born: 21 July 1984 (age 41); Jászberény, Hungary

Sport
- Sport: Short track speed skating

Marianna Nagy (born 21 July 1984) is a Hungarian short track speed skater. She competed in three events at the 2002 Winter Olympics.
