= Ivett Szöllősi =

Hungarian biathlete (born 1982)

Personal information
- Nationality: Hungarian
- Born: 22 December 1982 (age 42); Miskolc, Hungary

Sport
- Sport: Biathlon

Ivett Szöllősi (born 22 December 1982) is a Hungarian biathlete. She competed in the women's individual event at the 2002 Winter Olympics.
