= Wang Weiyi (biathlete) =

Chinese biathlete (born 1967)

Personal information
- Nationality: Chinese
- Born: 4 February 1967 (age 58)

Sport
- Sport: Biathlon

Wang Weiyi (born 4 February 1967) is a Chinese biathlete. He competed in the men's 20 km individual event at the 1992 Winter Olympics.
