= Inna Sheshkil =

Kazakhstani biathlete (born 1971)

Medal record

Women's biathlon

Representing Kazakhstan

Asian Winter Games
Gold medal – first place	1996 Harbin	7.5 km sprint
Gold medal – first place	1996 Harbin	15 km individual

Inna Sheshkil (born June 20, 1971) is a Kazakhstani biathlete. She was born in Makinsk. She represented Kazakhstan at the 1994 Winter Olympics in Lillehammer, where she placed fourth in the 7.5 km sprint, 5 seconds from gold. In this race she fell 3 metres before the finishline, and probably lost something that could have been a gold medal. She also competed at the 1998 Winter Olympics in Nagano.
