= Tan Hongbin =

Chinese biathlete (born 1967)

Personal information
- Nationality: Chinese
- Born: 12 June 1967 (age 57)

Sport
- Sport: Biathlon

Tan Hongbin (born 12 June 1967) is a Chinese biathlete. He competed in the men's 20 km individual event at the 1992 Winter Olympics.
