= South Korea at the 2003 Asian Winter Games =

- IOC code: KOR
- NOC: Korean Olympic Committee

in Aomori
- Competitors: 128
- Medals Ranked 2nd: Gold 10 Silver 8 Bronze 10 Total 28

Asian Winter Games appearances (overview)
- 1986; 1990; 1996; 1999; 2003; 2007; 2011; 2017; 2025; 2029

South Korea (IOC designation:Korea) participated in the 2003 Asian Winter Games held in Aomori, Japan from February 1, 2003 to February 8, 2003.

== Medal summary ==
=== Medal table ===
Sport	Gold	Silver	Bronze	Total
Short-track speed skating	6	3	5	14
Speed skating	2	2	2	6
Curling	1	1	0	2
Ski jumping	1	0	1	2
Snowboarding	0	1	1	2
Biathlon	0	1	0	1
Alpine skiing	0	0	1	1
Totals (7 entries)	10	8	10	28

=== Medalists ===
==== Gold ====
Curling

- Men - Lee Dong-keun, Kim Soo-hyuk, Park Jae-cheol, Choi Min-suk, Ko Seung-wan

Short track speed skating

- Men's 1000 m - Ahn Hyun-soo
- Men's 1500 m - Ahn Hyun-soo
- Men's 3000 m - Song Suk-woo
- Men's 5000 m Relay - Team Korea
- Women's 1500 m - Choi Eun-kyung

Ski jumping

- K90 (90m) Team - Kim Hyun-ki, Choi Heung-chul, Choi Yong-jik, Kang Chil-ku

Speed skating

- Men's 1000 m - Lee Kyu-hyuk
- Men's 1500 m - Lee Kyu-hyuk

==== Silver ====
Biathlon

- Men's 4 x 7.5 km Relay - Son Hae-kwon, Kim Kyung-tae, Shin Byung-kook, Park Yoon-bae

Curling

- Women - Kim Mi-yeon, Park Ji-hyun, Shin Mi-sung, Lee Hyun-jung, Park Kyung-mi

Short track speed skating

- Men's 3000 m - Lee Seung-jae
- Women's 1500 m - Cho Hae-ri
- Women's 3000 m - Choi Min-kyung

Snowboarding

- Men's giant slalom – Ji Myung-gon

Speed skating

- Men's 1500 m - Moon Jun
- Women's 3000 m - Baek Eun-bi

==== Bronze ====
Alpine skiing

- Women's slalom – Oh Jae-eun

Short track speed skating

- Men's 500 m - Song Suk-woo
- Men's 1500 m - Lee Seung-jae
- Women's 1000 m - Cho Hae-ri
- Women's 1500 m - Ko Gi-hyun
- Women's 3000 m - Kim Min-jee

Ski jumping

- K90 (90m) Individual - Choi Heung-chul

Snowboarding

- Men's halfpipe - Han Jin-bae

Speed skating

- Men's 1500 m - Yeo Sang-yeop
- Women's 1500 m - Baek Eun-bi

== Participation details ==
=== Alpine skiing ===
Men

Name	Event	Final	
Name	Event	Time	Rank
Ji Young-ha	Slalom	1:45.99	5th
Ji Young-ha	Giant slalom	2:09.69	6th
Byun Jong-moon	Slalom	1:46.53	7th
Byun Jong-moon	Giant slalom	2:09.63	5th
Hur Seung-wook	Slalom	1:46.66	8th
Hur Seung-wook	Giant slalom	2:11.63	7th
Gang Min-hyeok	Slalom	1:46.82	9th
Gang Min-hyeok	Giant slalom	Did not finish	

Women

Name	Event	Final	
Name	Event	Time	Rank
Oh Jae-eun	Slalom	1:40.88	3rd place, bronze medalist(s)
Oh Jae-eun	Giant slalom	1:56.76	5th
Min Erin	Slalom	1:45.80	6th
Min Erin	Giant slalom	1:59.45	7th
Kang Bo-seong	Slalom	1:52.14	9th
Kang Bo-seong	Giant slalom	2:02.33	10th
You Hae-min	Slalom	Did not finish	
You Hae-min	Giant slalom	1:58.84	6th

=== Biathlon ===
Men

Name	Event	Final	
Name	Event	Time	Rank
Son Hae-kwon	10 km sprint	30:53.4	7th
Son Hae-kwon	12.5 km pursuit	48:28.9	12th
Kim Kyung-tae	10 km sprint	31:51.8	12th
Kim Kyung-tae	12.5 km pursuit	46:36.2	10th
Shin Byung-gook	10 km sprint	33:08.1	15th
Shin Byung-gook	12.5 km pursuit	47:45.3	11th
Park Yoon-bae	10 km sprint	34:59.8	16th
Park Yoon-bae	12.5 km pursuit	55:01.0	16th
Son Hae-kwon; Kim Kyung-tae; Shin Byung-gook; Park Yoon-bae	4×7.5 km relay	1:32:36.1	2nd place, silver medalist(s)

Women

Name	Event	Final	
Name	Event	Time	Rank
Kim Ja-youn	7.5 km sprint	28:21.6	13th
Kim Ja-youn	10 km pursuit	54:05.5	12th
Baek Mi-ra	7.5 km sprint	29:34.5	14th
Baek Mi-ra	10 km pursuit	59:48.4	15th
Jung Yang-mi	7.5 km sprint	31:42.6	15th
Jung Yang-mi	10 km pursuit	57:10.9	14th
Dong Jung-lim	7.5 km sprint	33:44.2	16th
Dong Jung-lim	10 km pursuit	1:03:37.2	16th
Kim Ja-youn; Kim Young-ja; Baek Mi-ra; Jung Yang-mi	4×6 km relay	1:38:28.6	4th

=== Cross-country skiing ===
Men

Name	Event	Final	
Name	Event	Time	Rank
Park Byung-joo	10 km classic	28:15.7	9th
Park Byung-joo	15 km free	38:01.7	10th
Shin Doo-sun	10 km classic	29:37.0	14th
Shin Doo-sun	15 km free	38:28.1	11th
Choi Im-hun	10 km classic	29:31.7	13th
Choi Im-hun	30 km free	Did not finish	
Yoon Sung-soon	10 km classic	30:48.3	15th
Yoon Sung-soon	30 km free	1:33:49.1	10th
Jung Eui-myung	15 km free	39:34.4	13th
Jung Eui-myung	30 km free	Did not finish	
Shin Doo-sun; Choi Im-hun; Park Byung-joo; Jung Eui-myung	4×10 km relay	1:53:18.1	4th

Women

Name	Event	Final	
Name	Event	Time	Rank
Lee Chun-ja	5 km classic	16:06.5	11th
Lee Chun-ja	10 km free	29:14.1	9th
Kim Hyo-young	5 km classic	17:49.2	13th
Kim Hyo-young	10 km free	32:39.4	13th
Choi Seul-bi	5 km classic	18:08.5	14th
Choi Seul-bi	10 km free	32:40.3	14th

=== Figure skating ===
Men

Name	Event	SP	FS	TFP	Rank
Lee Dong-whun	Men	7	7	10.5	7th
Lee Kyu-hyun	Men	8	8	12.0	8th

Women

Name	Event	SP	FS	TFP	Rank
Cho Hae-lyeum	Ladies	8	8	12.0	8th
Lee Sun-bin	Ladies	11	9	14.5	9th
Shin Yea-ji	Ladies	10	10	15.0	10th

Ice dancing

Name	Event	CD	OD	FD	TFP	Rank
Kim Hye-min / Kim Min-woo	Ice dancing	6	6	6	12.0	6th

=== Ice hockey ===
- Men: 4th
- Women: 5th

=== Ski jumping ===
Men

Name	Event	Final	
Name	Event	Score	Rank
Choi Heung-chul	Normal hill individual	218.0	3rd place, bronze medalist(s)
Kim Hyun-ki	Normal hill individual	210.0	6th
Choi Yong-jik	Normal hill individual	195.5	8th
Kang Chil-ku	Normal hill individual	195.0	9th
Choi Heung-chul; Kim Hyun-ki; Choi Yong-jik; Kang Chil-ku	Normal hill team	952.0	1st place, gold medalist(s)

=== Snowboard ===
Men

Name	Event	Final	
Name	Event	Score/Time	Rank
Han Jin-bae	Halfpipe	37.6	3rd place, bronze medalist(s)
Lee Jae-woong	Halfpipe	28.6	5
Lee Chang-ho	Halfpipe	22.4	7
Kim Soo-chul	Halfpipe	20.3	8
Ji Myung-kon	Slalom	1:40.34	2nd place, silver medalist(s)
Ji Myung-kon	Giant slalom	2:26.46	6
Ji Won-duk	Slalom	1:46.90	5
Ji Won-duk	Giant slalom	2:24.79	4

=== Speed skating ===
Men

Name	Event	Final	
Name	Event	Time	Rank
Kim Cheol-su	500 m	1:14.42	10
Park Jae-man	500 m	1:15.60	12
Park Jae-man	1000 m	1:16.31	12
Lee Kyu-hyuk	500 m	1:13.04	4
Lee Kyu-hyuk	1000 m	1:13.96	1st place, gold medalist(s)
Lee Kyu-hyuk	1500 m	1:54.65	1st place, gold medalist(s)
Choi Jae-bong	500 m	1:13.47	5
Choi Jae-bong	1000 m	1:14.06	4
Choi Jae-bong	1500 m	1:56.22	4
Mun Jun	1000 m	1:15.10	7
Mun Jun	1500 m	1:54.89	2nd place, silver medalist(s)
Mun Jun	5000 m	7:15.77	7
Yeo Sang-yeop	1500 m	1:55.69	3rd place, bronze medalist(s)
Yeo Sang-yeop	10000 m	14:53.18	6
Yoo Won-cheol	5000 m	7:34.82	11
Lee Seung-hwan	5000 m	7:14.91	5
Lee Seung-hwan	10000 m	Disqualified	
Choi Keun-won	10000 m	15:03.46	7

Women

Name	Event	Final	
Name	Event	Time	Rank
Choi Seung-yong	500 m	1:20.99	7
Choi Seung-yong	1000 m	1:24.20	9
Cho Seon-yeon	500 m	1:22.45	10
Cho Seon-yeon	1000 m	1:26.07	13
Lee Yong-ju	500 m	1:23.67	11
Lee Yong-ju	1000 m	1:24.23	10
Yoon Hee-jun	500 m	1:24.37	12
Yoon Hee-jun	1000 m	1:24.88	12
Yoon Hee-jun	1500 m	2:11.76	9
Lee So-yeon	1500 m	2:13.93	11
Baek Eun-bi	1500 m	2:09.61	3rd place, bronze medalist(s)
Baek Eun-bi	3000 m	4:31.41	2nd place, silver medalist(s)
Choi Yun-suk	1500 m	2:10.65	5
Choi Yun-suk	3000 m	4:38.95	5
Nam Dal-ri	3000 m	4:43.32	7
