= Elena Khrustaleva =

Kazakhstani biathlete (born 1980)

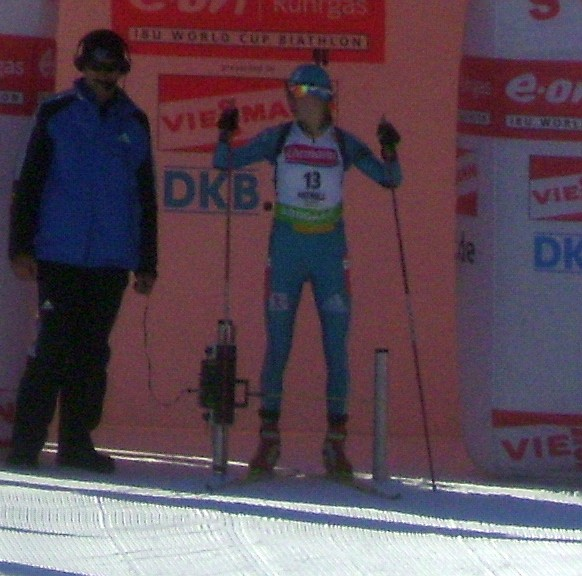

Personal information
- Born: 28 September 1980 (age 45) Krasnoyarsk, USSR

Sport
Medal record
Women's biathlon
Representing Kazakhstan
Olympic Games
Silver medal – second place	2010 Vancouver	15 km individual
Asian Games
Gold medal – first place	2011 Astana-Almaty	15 km individual
Gold medal – first place	2011 Astana-Almaty	4×6 km relay
Silver medal – second place	2007 Changchun	4×6 km relay
Silver medal – second place	2011 Astana-Almaty	7.5 km sprint
Bronze medal – third place	2007 Changchun	10 km pursuit
Representing Russia
Junior World Championships
Silver medal – second place	2000 Hochfilzen	10 km pursuit
Silver medal – second place	2000 Hochfilzen	3 × 7.5 km relay

Elena Vladimirovna Khrustaleva (Russian: Елена Владимировна Хрусталёва) (born 28 September 1980, in Krasnoyarsk) is a former Russian (until 2001, and since 2002 till 2006), Belarusian (since 2001 till 2002), and Kazakhstani (since 2006) biathlete. She won a silver medal at the 2010 Winter Olympics in Vancouver. This was Kazakhstan's 6th medal at the Winter Olympic Games and 45th overall Olympic medal. It is also both Kazakhstan's and Asia's only Olympic medal in biathlon.

== Career ==
Khrustaleva made her international debut at the Junior European Championships in 2000 at Zakopane. She won gold in singles and with the Russian squadron. Shortly afterwards, at the Junior World Championships, in Hochfilzen, she won a silver in the pursuit behind Sabrina Buchholz. After the season, she was ranked fourth in singles and sprint. At the Junior World Championships, in Khanty-Mansiysk, a summer biathlon, she won silver behind Tatiana Moiseyeva.

The following season, Khrustaleva changed her citizenship with Belarus. At the Biathlon World Cup, in Hochfilzen, she achieved 36th place in the sprint. Halfway through the season, just before the 2002 Winter Olympics, Khrustaleva achieved her best World Cup rankings. In the individual and the squadron, Khrustaleva achieved seventh and sixth. At the 2002 Winter Olympics, Khrustaleva managed 33rd place in the sprint and a 30th place in the pursuit.

For the 2003/04 season, she again changed her citizenship back with Russia. At the European Championships in 2003, in Forni Avoltri, Khrustaleva won gold in singles. With the Russian squadron, in 2005, in Novosibirsk, she won gold in the relay.

For the 2006/07 season, she changed her citizenship with Kazakhstan. At the World Championships in 2007, a summer biathlon in Otepää, she won silver medals in the sprint and mass start behind Natalya Sokolova. In the individual competition of the World Cup 2009, Khrustaleva achieved sixth place. At the 2010 Winter Olympics, she managed 5th place in the sprint and 2nd place in the Individual.
