= Valeriy Ivanov (biathlete) =

Kazakhstani biathlete (born 1969)

Personal information
- Nationality: Kazakhstani
- Born: 28 September 1969 (age 56) Makinsk, Kazakh SSR, Soviet Union

Sport
- Sport: Biathlon

Valeriy Ivanov (Валерий Владимирович Иванов, born 28 September 1969) is a Kazakhstani biathlete. He competed in the men's 20 km individual event at the 1998 Winter Olympics.
