= Hironao Meguro =

Japanese biathlete (born 1973)

Personal information
- Nationality: Japanese
- Born: 18 May 1973 (age 51); Niigata, Japan

Sport
- Sport: Biathlon

Hironao Meguro (born 18 May 1973) is a Japanese biathlete. He competed at the 1998 Winter Olympics and the 2002 Winter Olympics.
