= Inna Mozhevitina =

Kazakhstani biathlete (born 1985)

Irina Mozhevitina
Personal information
- Born: July 22, 1985 (age 40) Ridder, Kazakhstan

Sport
- Sport: Skiing
Medal record
Women's biathlon
Representing Kazakhstan
Asian Games
Gold medal – first place	2011 Astana-Almaty	4×6 km relay
Silver medal – second place	2007 Changchun	4×6 km relay
Bronze medal – third place	2003 Aomori	4×6 km relay
Bronze medal – third place	2007 Changchun	15 km individual
Youth World Championships
Gold medal – first place	2004 Haute Maurienne	7.5 km pursuit
Bronze medal – third place	2004 Haute Maurienne	10 km individual
Bronze medal – third place	2004 Haute Maurienne	6 km sprint
- Updated on December 19, 2015

Irina (Inna) Mozhevitina (born July 22, 1985, in Ridder, Kazakhstan) is a Kazakh biathlete.
