= Kyoji Suga =

Japanese biathlete (born 1969)

Personal information
- Nationality: Japanese
- Born: 11 May 1969 (age 55); Hokkaido, Japan

Sport
- Sport: Biathlon

Kyoji Suga (born 11 May 1969) is a Japanese biathlete. He competed at the 1998 Winter Olympics, the 2002 Winter Olympics and the 2006 Winter Olympics.
