= Jeon Jae-won =

South Korean biathlete (born 1973)

Personal information
- Nationality: South Korean
- Born: 21 November 1973 (age 51); Gangwon, South Korea

Sport
- Sport: Biathlon

Jeon Jae-won (born 21 November 1973) is a South Korean biathlete. He competed in the men's 20 km individual event at the 1998 Winter Olympics.
