= Tatsumi Kasahara =

Japanese biathlete (born 1977)

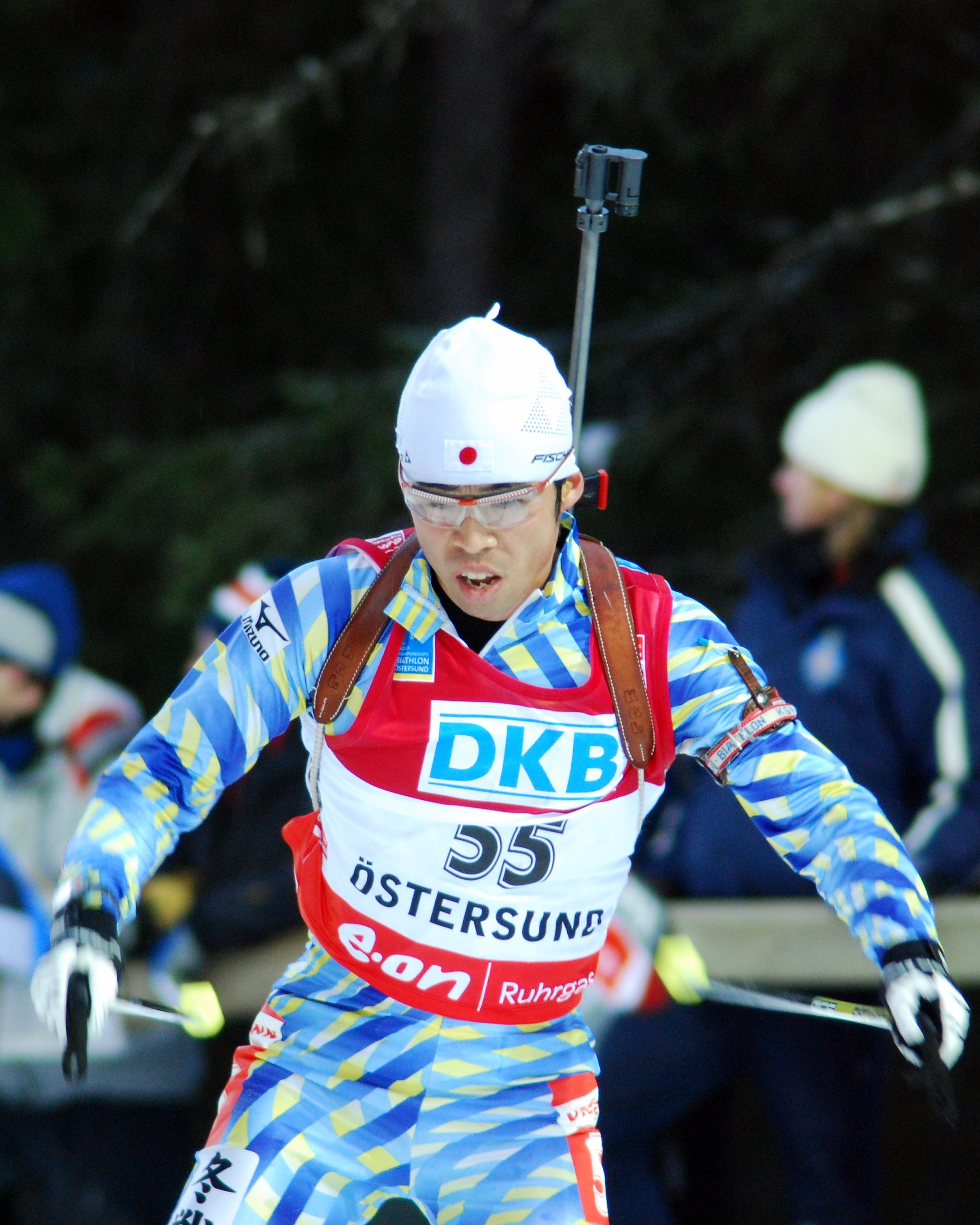
- Tatsumi Kasahara in 2008

Personal information
- Nationality: Japanese
- Born: 21 January 1977 (age 48); Niigata, Japan

Sport
- Sport: Biathlon

Tatsumi Kasahara (born 21 January 1977) is a Japanese biathlete. He competed in the men's 20 km individual event at the 2006 Winter Olympics.
