= Lyudmila Guryeva =

Kazakhstani biathlete (born 1977)

Personal information
- Nationality: Kazakhstani
- Born: 12 March 1977 (age 48); Almaty, Kazakhstan

Sport
- Sport: Biathlon

Lyudmila Guryeva (born 12 March 1977) is a Kazakhstani biathlete. She competed in the two events at the 1998 Winter Olympics.
