= Park Yoon-bae =

South Korean biathlete (born 1979)

Personal information
- Nationality: South Korean
- Born: 23 September 1979 (age 45)

Sport
- Sport: Biathlon

Park Yoon-bae (born 23 September 1979) is a South Korean biathlete. He competed in the men's 20 km individual event at the 2006 Winter Olympics.
