= Dmitriy Pantov =

Kazakhstani biathlete (born 1969)

Personal information
- Nationality: Kazakhstani
- Born: 12 September 1969 (age 55); Pavlodar, Kazakh SSR, Soviet Union

Sport
- Sport: Biathlon

Dmitriy Pantov (born 12 September 1969) is a Kazakhstani biathlete. He competed at the 1994 Winter Olympics, the 1998 Winter Olympics and the 2002 Winter Olympics.
