= Margarita Dulova =

Kazakhstani biathlete (born 1972)

Personal information
- Nationality: Kazakhstani
- Born: 4 January 1972 (age 54)

Sport
- Sport: Biathlon

Margarita Dulova (Маргарита Валерьевна Дулова, born 4 January 1972) is a Kazakhstani biathlete. She competed in the two events at the 1998 Winter Olympics.
