= Yu Shumei =

Chinese cross-country skier and biathlete

Medal record

Representing China

Women's biathlon

World Championships
Silver medal – second place	2000 Holmenkollen	15 km individual

Asian Winter Games
Gold medal – first place	1996 Harbin	4 × 7.5 km relay
Bronze medal – third place	1996 Harbin	7.5 km sprint
Bronze medal – third place	1996 Harbin	15 km individual

Women's cross-country skiing

Asian Winter Games
Gold medal – first place	1996 Harbin	4×5 km relay
Silver medal – second place	1996 Harbin	5 km

Shumei Yu (born October 20, 1977, in Dalian) is a Chinese former cross-country skier and biathlete. She competed in the 1998 Winter Olympics and 2002 Winter Olympics.
