= Olga Poltoranina =

Kazakhstani biathlete (born 1987)

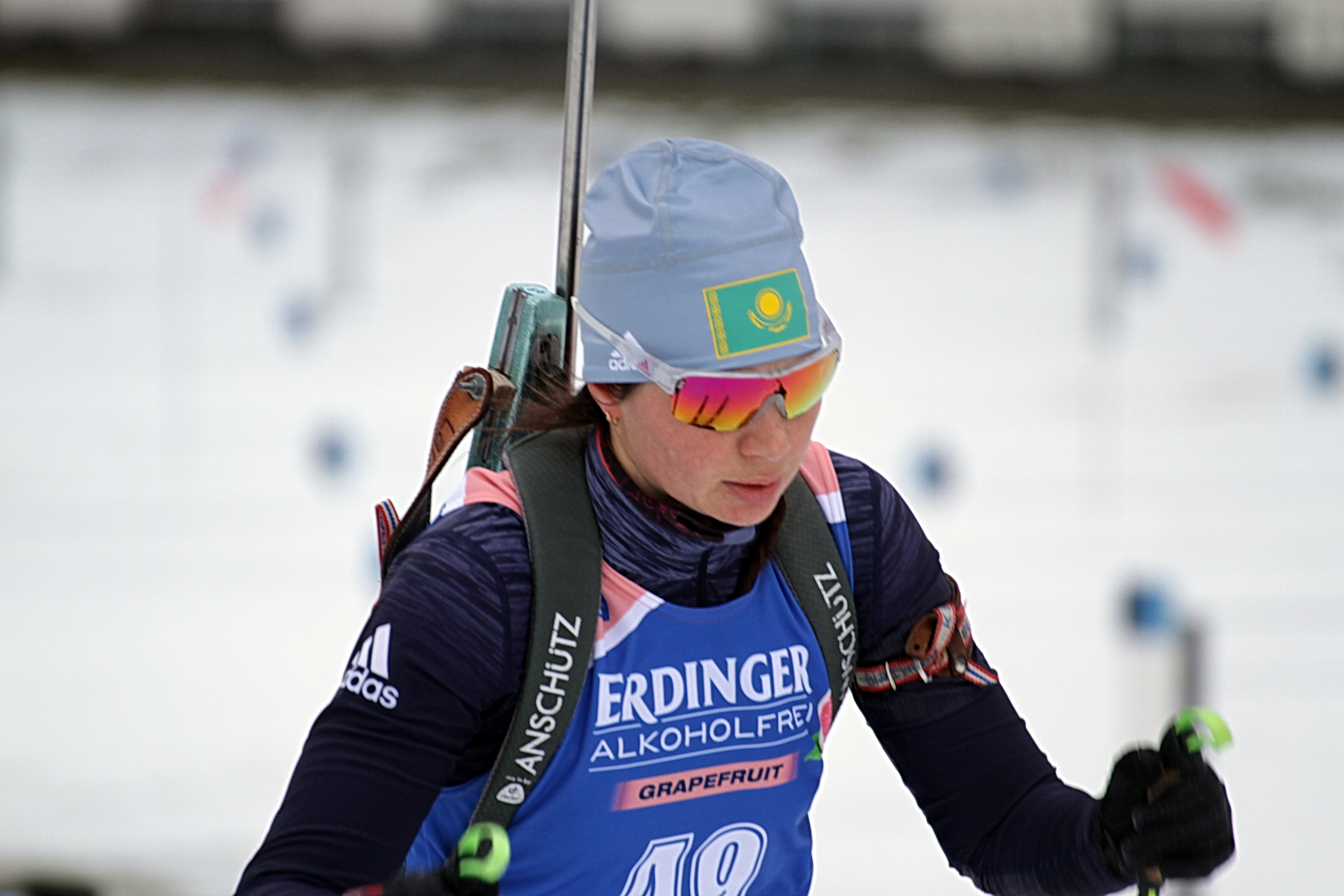
- Poltoranina in 2018

Personal information
- Born: 27 February 1987 (age 39) Leninogorsk, Kazakh SSR, Soviet Union

Sport
- Sport: Skiing
Medal record
Women's biathlon
Representing Kazakhstan
Asian Games
Gold medal – first place	2011 Astana-Almaty	4×6 km relay
Youth World Championships
Bronze medal – third place	2002 Ridnaun	6 km sprint

Olga Mikhailovna Poltoranina (née Dudchenko; (Note: Russian: Дудченко) Russian: Ольга Михайловна Полторанина; born 27 February 1987) is a Kazakhstani biathlete. She competed in the 2010/11 and 2011/12 World Cup seasons, and represented Kazakhstan at the Biathlon World Championships 2015 in Kontiolahti.

Her husband is cross-country skier Alexey Poltoranin.

== Biathlon results ==
All results are sourced from the International Biathlon Union.

=== Olympic Games ===
0 medals

Event	Individual	Sprint	Pursuit	Mass start	Relay	Mixed relay
(South Korea) 2018 Pyeongchang	46th	63rd	—	—	14th	—

=== World Championships ===
0 medals

Event	Individual	Sprint	Pursuit	Mass start	Relay	Mixed relay	Single mixed relay
(Austria) 2017 Hochfilzen	74th	37th	37th	—	12th	11th	—
(Czech Republic) 2024 Nové Město na Moravě	66th	—	—	—	18th	—	—
(Switzerland) 2025 Lenzerheide	75th	—	—	—	—	—	—

*During Olympic seasons competitions are only held for those events not included in the Olympic program.
**The single mixed relay was added as an event in 2019.
