= Zhang Qing (biathlete) =

Chinese skier (born 1980)

Personal information
- Nationality: Chinese
- Born: 7 April 1980 (age 45); Kaiyuan, China

Sport
- Sport: Biathlon, cross-country skiing

Zhang Qing (born 7 April 1980) is a Chinese skier. He competed at the 2002 Winter Olympics and the 2006 Winter Olympics.
