= Ikuyo Tsukidate =

Japanese biathlete (born 1977)

Personal information
- Nationality: Japanese
- Born: 15 January 1977 (age 48) Ikarigaseki, Aomori, Japan

Sport
- Sport: Biathlon

Ikuyo Tsukidate (築舘 郁代, Tsukidate Ikuyo; born 15 January 1977) is a Japanese biathlete. She competed in four events at the 2006 Winter Olympics.
