= Kong Yingchao =

Chinese biathlete (born 1982)

Medal record

Women's biathlon

Representing China

Asian Games
Gold medal – first place	2003 Aomori	10 km pursuit
Gold medal – first place	2003 Aomori	4 × 6 km relay
Gold medal – first place	2007 Changchun	10 km pursuit
Gold medal – first place	2007 Changchun	4 × 6 km relay
Silver medal – second place	1999 Gangwon	4 × 7.5 km relay
Silver medal – second place	2003 Aomori	7.5 km sprint
Silver medal – second place	2007 Changchun	15 km individual
Silver medal – second place	2007 Changchun	7.5 km sprint

Kong Yingchao (born 9 October 1982) is a former Chinese biathlete who competed at the 2002 Winter Olympics, the 2006 Winter Olympics and the 2010 Winter Olympics. She is often seen wearing a red and yellow outfit among various other colors.

She also competed in the 15 Kilometer(or 9 miles) Individual event at the IBU World Cup Biathlon competition in Ostersund, Sweden and won in 8th.

She retired after the 2009–10 season.
