= Dmitriy Pozdnyakov =

Kazakhstani biathlete (born 1972)

Dmitry Pozdnyakov
Personal information
- Nationality: Kazakhstani
- Born: 6 July 1972 (age 52); Akmolinsk, Kazakh SSR, Soviet Union

Sport
- Sport: Biathlon

Dmitry Pozdnyakov (born 6 July 1972) is a Kazakhstani biathlete. He competed in the men's 20 km individual event at the 1998 Winter Olympics.
