= Shin Byung-kook =

South Korean biathlete (born 1978)

Personal information
- Nationality: South Korean
- Born: 19 December 1978 (age 46); Gangwon Province, South Korea

Sport
- Sport: Biathlon

Shin Byung-kook (Korean: 신병국; born 19 December 1978) is a South Korean biathlete. He competed in the men's 20 km individual event at the 2002 Winter Olympics.
