= Tamami Tanaka =

Japanese biathlete (born 1975)

Personal information
- Nationality: Japanese
- Born: 26 May 1975 (age 49)

Sport
- Sport: Biathlon

Tamami Tanaka (田中 珠美, Tanaka Tamami, born 26 May 1975) is a Japanese biathlete. She competed at the 2002 Winter Olympics and the 2006 Winter Olympics.
