= Liu Xianying =

Chinese biathlete (born 1977)

Medal record

Women's biathlon

Representing China

World Championships
Silver medal – second place	2005 Hochfilzen	10 km pursuit

Asian Games
Gold medal – first place	2003 Aomori	4 × 6 km relay
Gold medal – first place	2007 Changchun	15 km individual
Gold medal – first place	2007 Changchun	7.5 km sprint
Gold medal – first place	2007 Changchun	4 × 6 km relay
Silver medal – second place	1999 Gangwon	15 km individual
Silver medal – second place	1999 Gangwon	4 × 7.5 km relay
Silver medal – second place	2003 Aomori	10 km pursuit
Silver medal – second place	2007 Changchun	10 km pursuit
Bronze medal – third place	2003 Aomori	7.5 km sprint

Liu Xianying (Chinese: 刘显应; pinyin: Liú Xiǎnyīng; born July 8, 1977, in Jilin) is a former Chinese biathlete who competed in the 1998 Winter Olympics, the 2002 Winter Olympics, the 2006 Winter Olympics and the 2010 Winter Olympics.

She retired after the 2009–10 season.
