= Kim Ja-youn =

South Korean biathlete (born 1978)

Personal information
- Nationality: South Korean
- Born: 28 April 1978 (age 46)

Sport
- Sport: Biathlon

Kim Ja-youn (born 28 April 1978) is a South Korean biathlete. She competed in two events at the 2002 Winter Olympics.
