= Sun Ribo =

Chinese biathlete (born 1976)

Medal record

Women's biathlon

Representing China

World Championships
Silver medal – second place	2005 Hochfilzen	15 km individual

Sun Ribo (born December 18, 1976, in Zhangwu) is a former Chinese biathlete who competed in the 1998 Winter Olympics, the 2002 Winter Olympics and the 2006 Winter Olympics.
