= Yelena Dubok =

Kazakhstani biathlete (born 1976)

Personal information
- Nationality: Kazakhstani
- Born: 3 August 1976 (age 49) Almaty, Kazakh SSR

Sport
- Sport: Biathlon

Yelena Dubok (Елена Владимировна Дубок, born 3 August 1976 in Almaty) is a Kazakhstani biathlete. She competed at the 1998 Winter Olympics and the 2002 Winter Olympics.
