= 2003 Asian Winter Games =

Multi-sport event in Aomori, Japan

V Asian Winter Games
- Host city: Aomori, Japan
- Motto: Asian Beat To The World
- Nations: 17
- Athletes: 641
- Events: 51 in 5 sports
- Opening: February 1, 2003
- Closing: February 8, 2003
- Opened by: Naruhito; Crown Prince of Japan
- Athlete's Oath: Kiminobu Kimura
- Torch lighter: Kayoko Fukushi
- Main venue: Aoi-mori Arena, Aomori City
- Website: net.pref.aomori.jp/awagoc (archived)

Summer

Winter

The 5th Asian Winter Games (Japanese: 第5回アジア冬季競技大会, romanized: Dai 5-kai Ajia tōkikyōgitaikai), also known as Aomori 2003 (Japanese: 青森2003), took place from February 1 to 8, 2003 in Aomori Prefecture, Japan.

== Mascot ==
Official mascot

The 2003 Winter Asiad mascot is Winta, a black woodpecker.

== Venues ==
The venues for the 2003 Winter Asiad were distributed all over Aomori Prefecture.

- Ajigasawa Town:
  - Ajigasawa Ski Area - Freestyle skiing, snowboarding
- Aomori City:
  - Aomori City Sports Complex - Curling
  - Aomori Prefectural Skating Rink - Figure skating
- Hachinohe City:
  - Nagane Park Speed Skating Rink - Speed skating
  - Niida Indoor Rink - Ice hockey (men's)
- Iwaki Town:
  - Iwaki General Athletic Park - Biathlon
- Misawa City:
  - Misawa Ice Arena - Ice hockey (women's), short-track speed skating
- Owani Town:
  - Ajara Athletic Park - Cross-country skiing
  - Owani Onsen Ski Area - Alpine skiing
  - Takinosawa Ski Jumping Hill - Ski jumping

== Sports ==
A total of 51 medal events in 11 medal sports were contested in the 5th Asian Winter Games. Freestyle skiing was reinstated, and ski jumping, a demonstration sport in past Winter Asiads, was included in the official roster of medal events. The numbers in parentheses indicate the number of events for the sport.

- Alpine skiing (4)
- Biathlon (6)
- Cross-country skiing (7)
- Curling (2)
- Figure skating (4)
- Freestyle skiing (2)
- Ice hockey (2)
- Short-track speed skating (10)
- Ski jumping (2)
- Speed skating (9)
- Snowboarding (3)

Demonstration sports

- Snowboarding (3) () (Women)

== Participating nations ==
Names are arranged in alphabetical order. The number in parentheses indicates the number of participants (athletes and officials) that the NOC contributed.

- China (117)
- Chinese Taipei (16)
- India (6)
- Iran (16)
- Japan (154)
- Kazakhstan (91)
- Kyrgyzstan (1)
- Lebanon (7)
- Mongolia (33)
- Nepal (3)
- North Korea (29)
- Pakistan (6)
- Palestine (1)
- South Korea (127)
- Tajikistan (3)
- Thailand (27)
- Uzbekistan (4)

Non-competing nations

- Bangladesh
- Bhutan
- Hong Kong
- Kuwait
- Macau
- Malaysia
- Qatar
- Singapore
- Sri Lanka
- Timor-Leste
- Turkmenistan
- Vietnam

=== Number of athletes by National Olympic Committees (by highest to lowest) ===
IOC Letter Code	Country	Athletes
JPN	Japan	154
KOR	South Korea	127
CHN	China	117
KAZ	Kazakhstan	91
MGL	Mongolia	33
PRK	North Korea	29
THA	Thailand	27
TPE	Chinese Taipei	16
IRI	Iran	16
LIB	Lebanon	7
IND	India	6
PAK	Pakistan	6
UZB	Uzbekistan	4
NEP	Nepal	3
TJK	Tajikistan	3
KGZ	Kyrgyzstan	1
PLE	Palestine	1

== Calendar ==
●	Opening ceremony	Event competitions	●	Event finals	●	Closing ceremony

January / February 2003	30th Thu	31st Fri	1st Sat	2nd Sun	3rd Mon	4th Tue	5th Wed	6th Thu	7th Fri	8th Sat	Gold medals
Alpine skiing				1	1		1		1		4
Biathlon					2		2		2		6
Cross-country skiing				2	1	1	1	1	1		7
Curling									2		2
Figure Skating					1	3					4
Freestyle skiing								2			2
Ice hockey							1		1		2
Short-track speed skating								4	6		10
Ski jumping						1		1			2
Snowboarding				1	1	1					3
Speed skating				2	4		3				9
Total gold medals				6	10	6	8	8	13		51
Ceremonies			●							●	
January / February 2003	30th Thu	31st Fri	1st Sat	2nd Sun	3rd Mon	4th Tue	5th Wed	6th Thu	7th Fri	8th Sat	Gold medals

== Medal table ==
* Host nation (Japan)

Rank	Nation	Gold	Silver	Bronze	Total
1	Japan*	24	23	20	67
2	South Korea	10	8	10	28
3	China	9	11	13	33
4	Kazakhstan	7	7	6	20
5	Lebanon	1	1	0	2
6	North Korea	0	1	1	2
7	Uzbekistan	0	0	1	1
Totals (7 entries)		51	51	51	153

Preceded by Kangwon	Asian Winter Games; Aomori; V Asian Winter Games (2003)	Succeeded by Changchun
