= Cross-country skiing at the 2002 Winter Olympics – Men's 2 × 10 kilometre pursuit =

Men's 2 × 10 kilometre pursuit at the XIX Olympic Winter Games
- Venue: Soldier Hollow
- Dates: 14 February 2002
- Competitors: 85 from 37 nations
- Winning time: 49:48.9

Medalists
| 1st place, gold medalist(s) | | Frode Estil | Norway |
| 1st place, gold medalist(s) | | Thomas Alsgaard | Norway |
| 3rd place, bronze medalist(s) | | Per Elofsson | Sweden |

The men's 2 × 10 kilometre pursuit cross-country skiing competition at the 2002 Winter Olympics in Salt Lake City, United States, was held on 14 February at Soldier Hollow.

The competition consisted of two races. The first was an interval start 10 kilometre classical race. The top 60 advanced to the 10 km freestyle pursuit where the competitors started based on the times from the classical event. The winner of the race was the first competitor(s) to finish the second race.

Johann Mühlegg of Spain originally won the competition, but nine days later he failed a doping test following his gold medal win in the 50 km classical race. It wasn't until 2003 that Mühlegg was stripped of the gold medal in this event, too.

== Background ==
At the previous Olympics, the pursuit used a 10km/15km format. The defending champion was Thomas Alsgaard. The silver medalist, Bjørn Dæhlie, and the bronze medalist, Vladimir Smirnov had both retired from competition. Per Elofsson was the 2001 world champion.

== Results ==
| Rank | Bib | Name | Country | 10 km classic | Rank | Start | 10 km free | Rank | Finish time | Deficit |
|---|---|---|---|---|---|---|---|---|---|---|
| 1st place, gold medalist(s) | 80 | Frode Estil | Norway | 26:20.4 | 2 | 0:13 | 23:28.9 | 14 | 49:48.9 | |
| 1st place, gold medalist(s) | 69 | Thomas Alsgaard | Norway | 26:56.4 | 16 | 0:49 | 22:52.9 | 1 | 49:48.9 | |
| 3rd place, bronze medalist(s) | 75 | Per Elofsson | Sweden | 26:39.3 | 9 | 0:32 | 23:13.9 | 4 | 49:52.9 | +4.0 |
| 4 | 46 | Giorgio di Centa | Italy | 26:30.9 | 4 | 0:23 | 23:23.8 | 10 | 49:53.8 | +4.9 |
| 5 | 63 | Vitaly Denisov | Russia | 26:32.4 | 6 | 0:25 | 23:26.5 | 11 | 49:58.5 | +9.6 |
| 6 | 71 | Pietro Piller Cottrer | Italy | 27:06.2 | 23 | 0:59 | 22:55.2 | 2 | 50:01.2 | +12.3 |
| 7 | 76 | Anders Aukland | Norway | 26:27.6 | 3 | 0:20 | 23:43.8 | 20 | 50:10.8 | +21.9 |
| 8 | 77 | Jaak Mae | Estonia | 26:31.1 | 5 | 0:23 | 23:41.1 | 19 | 50:12.1 | +23.2 |
| 9 | 78 | Mikhail Botvinov | Austria | 26:32.5 | 7 | 0:25 | 23:45.2 | 21 | 50:17.2 | +28.3 |
| 10 | 70 | René Sommerfeldt | Germany | 26:46.0 | 12 | 0:38 | 23:36.7 | 18 | 50:22.7 | +33.8 |
| 11 | 52 | Roman Leybyuk | Ukraine | 26:37.5 | 8 | 0:30 | 23:46.2 | 22 | 50:23.2 | +34.3 |
| 12 | 74 | Lukáš Bauer | Czech Republic | 27:03.7 | 21 | 0:56 | 23:20.3 | 6 | 50:23.3 | +34.4 |
| 13 | 50 | Vincent Vittoz | France | 27:05.2 | 22 | 0:58 | 23:21.8 | 8 | 50:26.8 | +37.9 |
| 14 | 47 | Kris Freeman | United States | 26:57.3 | 18 | 0:50 | 23:35.0 | 16 | 50:32.0 | +43.1 |
| 15 | 40 | Andrei Nevzorov | Kazakhstan | 27:14.3 | 25 | 1:07 | 23:20.7 | 7 | 50:34.7 | +45.8 |
| 16 | 53 | Sergey Novikov | Russia | 26:55.8 | 15 | 0:48 | 23:50.9 | 27 | 50:45.9 | +57.0 |
| 17 | 13 | Andreas Schlütter | Germany | 26:52.5 | 13 | 0:45 | 23:56.2 | 29 | 50:48.2 | +59.3 |
| 18 | 15 | Fulvio Valbusa | Italy | 27:30.6 | 31 | 1:23 | 23:19.7 | 5 | 50:49.7 | +1:00.8 |
| 19 | 36 | John Bauer | United States | 27:00.2 | 19 | 0:53 | 23:49.9 | 26 | 50:49.9 | +1:01.0 |
| 20 | 65 | Fabio Maj | Italy | 27:16.4 | 27 | 1:09 | 23:34.8 | 15 | 50:50.8 | +1:01.9 |
| 21 | 58 | Andrey Golovko | Kazakhstan | 26:45.8 | 11 | 0:38 | 24:10.9 | 35 | 50:55.9 | +1:07.0 |
| 22 | 64 | Kristen Skjeldal | Norway | 26:55.5 | 14 | 0:48 | 24:02.6 | 34 | 50:57.6 | +1:08.7 |
| 23 | 17 | Tobias Angerer | Germany | 27:30.7 | 32 | 1:23 | 23:27.9 | 13 | 50:57.9 | +1:09.0 |
| 24 | 48 | Masaaki Kozu | Japan | 27:37.6 | 35 | 1:30 | 23:35.6 | 17 | 51:12.6 | +1:23.7 |
| 25 | 67 | Ivan Bátory | Slovakia | 26:57.2 | 17 | 0:50 | 24:15.7 | 38 | 51:12.7 | +1:23.8 |
| 26 | 66 | Markus Hasler | Liechtenstein | 27:52.1 | 43 | 1:44 | 23:22.3 | 9 | 51:14.3 | +1:25.4 |
| 27 | 73 | Mathias Fredriksson | Sweden | 27:02.9 | 20 | 0:55 | 24:17.9 | 39 | 51:19.9 | +1:31.0 |
| 28 | 42 | Niklas Jonsson | Sweden | 27:32.0 | 34 | 1:24 | 23:53.1 | 28 | 51:25.1 | +1:36.2 |
| 29 | 68 | Alexei Prokourorov | Russia | 27:24.5 | 29 | 1:17 | 24:01.2 | 33 | 51:25.2 | +1:36.3 |
| 30 | 51 | Roman Virolainen | Belarus | 26:42.2 | 10 | 0:35 | 24:54.1 | 52 | 51:36.1 | +1:47.2 |
| 31 | 32 | Sami Repo | Finland | 28:09.2 | 46 | 2:02 | 23:27.7 | 12 | 51:36.7 | +1:47.8 |
| 32 | 57 | Janusz Krezelok | Poland | 27:14.6 | 26 | 1:07 | 24:23.3 | 41 | 51:37.3 | +1:48.4 |
| 33 | 14 | Mitsuo Horigome | Japan | 27:50.3 | 40 | 1:43 | 23:47.5 | 23 | 51:37.5 | +1:48.6 |
| 34 | 39 | Hiroyuki Imai | Japan | 27:42.6 | 37 | 1:35 | 23:57.8 | 31 | 51:39.8 | +1:50.9 |
| 35 | 59 | Alexandre Rousselet | France | 27:28.1 | 30 | 1:20 | 24:12.9 | 36 | 51:40.9 | +1:52.0 |
| 36 | 72 | Vladimir Vilisov | Russia | 27:21.3 | 28 | 1:14 | 24:24.4 | 42 | 51:45.4 | +1:56.5 |
| 37 | 56 | Juan Jesús Gutíerrez | Spain | 28:06.7 | 45 | 1:59 | 23:48.5 | 25 | 51:54.5 | +2:05.6 |
| 38 | 43 | Axel Teichmann | Germany | 27:31.2 | 33 | 1:24 | 24:29.4 | 45 | 52:00.4 | +2:11.5 |
| 39 | 30 | Nikolay Chebotko | Kazakhstan | 27:50.0 | 39 | 1:42 | 24:13.5 | 37 | 52:03.5 | +2:14.6 |
| 40 | 6 | Patrik Maechler | Switzerland | 28:12.7 | 47 | 2:05 | 23:57.1 | 30 | 52:09.1 | +2:20.2 |
| 41 | 19 | Reto Burgermeister | Switzerland | 27:51.4 | 41 | 1:44 | 24:27.1 | 44 | 52:18.1 | +2:29.2 |
| 42 | 8 | Justin Wadsworth | United States | 28:32.5 | 54 | 2:25 | 23:48.2 | 24 | 52:20.2 | +2:31.3 |
| 43 | 61 | Stephan Kunz | Liechtenstein | 28:01.4 | 44 | 1:54 | 24:20.2 | 40 | 52:21.2 | +2:32.3 |
| 44 | 37 | Martin Koukal | Czech Republic | 28:26.9 | 53 | 2:19 | 23:58.8 | 32 | 52:24.8 | +2:35.9 |
| 45 | 34 | Patrick Weaver | United States | 27:38.3 | 36 | 1:31 | 25:01.2 | 55 | 52:39.2 | +2:50.3 |
| 46 | 38 | Sami Pietila | Finland | 28:20.1 | 49 | 2:12 | 24:25.8 | 43 | 52:45.8 | +2:56.9 |
| 47 | 41 | Ricardas Panavas | Lithuania | 27:51.9 | 42 | 1:44 | 24:56.1 | 53 | 52:47.1 | +2:58.2 |
| 48 | 11 | Denis Krivushkin | Kazakhstan | 28:22.0 | 51 | 2:14 | 24:42.7 | 51 | 53:04.7 | +3:15.8 |
| 49 | 20 | Katsuhito Ebisawa | Japan | 28:45.2 | 58 | 2:38 | 24:36.3 | 47 | 53:21.3 | +3:32.4 |
| 50 | 62 | Martin Bajcicak | Slovakia | 27:06.9 | 24 | 0:59 | 26:31.0 | 59 | 53:37.0 | +3:48.1 |
| 51 | 21 | Juris Germanis | Latvia | 28:41.1 | 56 | 2:33 | 24:58.8 | 54 | 53:39.8 | +3:50.9 |
| 52 | 35 | Milan Sperl | Czech Republic | 29:04.6 | 60 | 2:57 | 24:36.7 | 48 | 53:40.7 | +3:51.8 |
| 53 | 49 | Priit Narusk | Estonia | 28:22.5 | 52 | 2:15 | 25:23.2 | 56 | 53:45.2 | +3:56.3 |
| 54 | 25 | Haritz Zunzunegui | Spain | 29:01.3 | 59 | 2:54 | 24:47.0 | 49 | 53:48.0 | +3:59.1 |
| 55 | 54 | Matej Soklic | Slovenia | 28:20.7 | 50 | 2:13 | 25:52.4 | 57 | 54:12.4 | +4:23.5 |
| 56 | 31 | Christophe Perrillat | France | 28:13.5 | 48 | 2:06 | 26:05.9 | 58 | 54:18.9 | +4:30.0 |
| DNF | 45 | Sergei Dolidovich | Belarus | 28:44.0 | 57 | 2:36 | DNF | | | |
| | 33 | Vladislavas Zybailo | Lithuania | 29:08.1 | 61 | Did not advance | | | | |
| | 23 | Zsolt Antal | Romania | 29:13.0 | 62 | Did not advance | | | | |
| | 10 | Emmanuel Jonnier | France | 29:21.2 | 63 | Did not advance | | | | |
| | 1 | Alexander Sannikov | Belarus | 29:30.5 | 64 | Did not advance | | | | |
| | 60 | Sin Doo-Sun | South Korea | 29:54.5 | 65 | Did not advance | | | | |
| | 3 | Vadim Gusev | Lithuania | 29:57.7 | 66 | Did not advance | | | | |
| | 24 | Denis Klobucar | Croatia | 30:00.7 | 67 | Did not advance | | | | |
| | 28 | Denis Vorobiev | Belarus | 30:04.3 | 68 | Did not advance | | | | |
| | 27 | Park Byung-Joo | South Korea | 30:15.6 | 69 | Did not advance | | | | |
| | 29 | Han Dawei | China | 30:15.7 | 70 | Did not advance | | | | |
| | 2 | Lefteris Fafalis | Greece | 31:11.7 | 71 | Did not advance | | | | |
| | 5 | Damir Jurcevic | Croatia | 31:15.7 | 72 | Did not advance | | | | |
| | 12 | Ivan Bariakov | Bulgaria | 31.17.1 | 73 | Did not advance | | | | |
| | 4 | Aram Hajiyan | Armenia | 31:52.7 | 74 | Did not advance | | | | |
| | 26 | Slavtscho Batinkov | Bulgaria | 32:12.6 | 75 | Did not advance | | | | |
| | 9 | Jung Eui-Myung | South Korea | 32:15.1 | 76 | Did not advance | | | | |
| | 18 | Zoltan Tagscherer | Hungary | 33:10.6 | 77 | Did not advance | | | | |
| | 7 | Mátyás Holló | Hungary | 33:15.1 | 78 | Did not advance | | | | |
| | 85 | Seyed Mostafa Mirhashemi | Iran | 34:42.7 | 79 | Did not advance | | | | |
| | 83 | Philip Boit | Kenya | 36:21.6 | 80 | Did not advance | | | | |
| | 84 | Arturo Kinch | Costa Rica | 41:30.5 | 81 | Did not advance | | | | |
| | 82 | Jayaram Khadka | Nepal | 44:20.3 | 82 | Did not advance | | | | |
| | 81 | Isaac Menyoli | Cameroon | 45:40.3 | 83 | Did not advance | | | | |
| | 22 | Morgan Göransson | Sweden | DNS | | | | | | |
| | 44 | Donald Farley | Canada | DNS | | | | | | |
| DSQ | 16 | Marc Mayer | Austria | ~~28:34.6~~ | ~~55~~ | ~~2:27~~ | ~~24:47.2~~ | ~~50~~ | ~~53:21.2~~ | DSQ |
| DSQ | 55 | Achim Walcher | Austria | ~~27:49.8~~ | ~~38~~ | ~~1:42~~ | ~~24:30.0~~ | ~~46~~ | ~~52:19.0~~ | DSQ |
| DSQ | 79 | Johann Mühlegg | Spain | ~~26:07.2~~ | ~~1~~ | ~~0:00~~ | ~~23:13.4~~ | ~~3~~ | ~~49:20.4~~ | DSQ |
