= Cross-country skiing at the 2002 Winter Olympics – Men's sprint =

Men's sprint at the XIX Olympic Winter Games
- Venue: Soldier Hollow
- Dates: 19 February 2002
- Competitors: 72 from 36 nations
- Winning time: 02:56.9

Medalists
1st place, gold medalist(s)		Tor Arne Hetland	Norway
2nd place, silver medalist(s)		Peter Schlickenrieder	Germany
3rd place, bronze medalist(s)		Cristian Zorzi	Italy

The men's sprint cross-country skiing competition at the 2002 Winter Olympics in Salt Lake City, United States, was held on 19 February at Soldier Hollow.

Seventy-two skiers competed in the qualifying round, of which the 16 fastest competitors advanced to the final rounds. The 16 competitors who advanced from the qualification were divided into 4 quarterfinal heats of 4 skier each. The two best competitors in each quarterfinal advanced to the semifinal. The two best competitors in each semifinal advanced to the A Final competing for gold, silver, bronze and fourth place. The two lowest ranked competitors in the semifinal were placed in the B Final, competing for ranks from 5th to 8th position.

== Results ==
Q — qualified for next round

=== Qualifying ===
72 competitors started the qualification race.

Rank	Bib	Name	Country	Time	Deficit	Note
1	9	Håvard Bjerkeli	Norway	02:50.07	–	Q
2	14	Cristian Zorzi	Italy	02:50.34	+0.27	Q
3	24	Janusz Krężelok	Poland	02:50.67	+0.60	Q
4	5	Trond Iversen	Norway	02:51.09	+1.02	Q
5	15	Peter Schlickenrieder	Germany	02:51.12	+1.05	Q
6	2	Tor Arne Hetland	Norway	02:51.19	+1.12	Q
7	1	Silvio Fauner	Italy	02:51.51	+1.44	Q
8	12	Martin Koukal	Czech Republic	02:52.09	+2.02	Q
9	16	Björn Lind	Sweden	02:52.17	+2.10	Q
10	13	Tobias Angerer	Germany	02:52.31	+2.24	Q
11	10	Freddy Schwienbacher	Italy	02:53.03	+2.96	Q
12	4	Trond Einar Elden	Norway	02:53.31	+3.24	Q
13	28	Matej Soklič	Slovenia	02:53.42	+3.35	Q
14	11	Peter Larsson	Sweden	02:53.55	+3.48	Q
15	6	Markus Hasler	Liechtenstein	02:53.74	+3.67	Q
16	62	Hannu Manninen	Finland	02:53.67	+3.80	Q
17	58	Sergey Novikov	Russia	02:54.35	+4.28	
18	3	Thobias Fredriksson	Sweden	02:54.45	+4.38	
19	30	Christoph Eigenmann	Switzerland	02:54.76	+4.69	
20	17	René Sommerfeldt	Germany	02:54.87	+4.80	
21	7	Ari Palolahti	Finland	02:55.28	+5.21	
22	22	Sami Repo	Finland	02:55.47	+5.40	
23	26	Stephan Kunz	Liechtenstein	02:55.91	+5.84	
24	33	Reinhard Neuner	Austria	02:56.20	+6.13	
25	23	Jörgen Brink	Sweden	02:56.84	+6.77	
26	18	Keijo Kurttila	Finland	02:56.91	+6.84	
27	40	Roman Virolainen	Belarus	02:57.48	+7.41	
28	21	Fulvio Valbusa	Italy	02:57.60	+7.53	
29	19	Vasily Rochev	Russia	02:57.76	+7.69	
30	32	Carl Swenson	United States	02:58.56	+8.49	
31	20	Vitaly Denisov	Russia	02:59.21	+9.14	
32	31	Dmitri Tichkine	Russia	02:59.40	+9.33	
33	57	Indrek Tobreluts	Estonia	03:00.02	+9.95	
34	46	Nikolay Chebotko	Kazakhstan	03:00.31	+10.24	
35	29	Pavo Raudsepp	Estonia	03:01.04	+10.97	
36	34	Torin Koos	United States	03:01.32	+11.25	
37	42	Lars Flora	United States	03:01.41	+11.34	
38	35	Daichi Azegami	Japan	03:01.47	+11.40	
39	27	Priit Narusk	Estonia	03:01.75	+11.68	
40	47	Zoltan Tagscherer	Hungary	03:01.90	+11.83	
41	38	Lefteris Fafalis	Greece	03:01.98	+11.91	
42	41	Kris Freeman	United States	03:02.68	+12.61	
43	60	Denis Krivushkin	Kazakhstan	03:02.73	+12.66	
44	44	Donald Farley	Canada	03:03.02	+12.95	
45	36	Roman Leybyuk	Ukraine	03:03.21	+13.14	
46	43	Zsolt Antal	Romania	03:05.24	+15.17	
47	37	Masaaki Kozu	Japan	03:05.90	+15.83	
=	53	Damir Jurcevic	Croatia	03:05.90	+15.83	
49	64	Imre Tagscherer	Hungary	03:05.98	+15.91	
50	45	Vladimir Bortsov	Kazakhstan	03:06.03	+15.96	
51	59	Maxim Odnodvortsev	Kazakhstan	03:06.83	+16.76	
52	54	Dawei Han	China	03:07.00	+16.93	
53	61	Vladislavas Zybailo	Lithuania	03:07.25	+17.18	
=	52	Vadim Gusev	Lithuania	03:07.25	+17.18	
55	39	Alexij Tregobov	Belarus	03:08.05	+17.98	
56	48	Denis Vorobiev	Belarus	03:08.79	+18.72	
57	63	Sin Doo-Sun	South Korea	03:11.89	+21.82	
58	50	Aleksandr Schalak	Belarus	03:13.63	+23.56	
59	51	Slavtscho Batinkov	Bulgaria	03:14.21	+24.14	
60	55	Mátyás Holló	Hungary	03:15.11	+25.04	
61	65	Sabahattin Oglago	Turkey	03:18.24	+28.17	
62	56	Ivan Bariakov	Bulgaria	03:18.97	+28.90	
63	49	Aram Hajiyan	Armenia	03:24.89	+34.82	
64	66	Gokio Dineski	Macedonia	03:29.29	+39.22	
65	67	Philip Boit	Kenya	03:51.49	+1:01.42	
66	68	Isaac Menyoli	Cameroon	04:10.07	+1:20.00	
67	71	Prawat Nagvajara	Thailand	04:14.55	+1:24.48	
68	69	Arturo Kinch	Costa Rica	04:22.72	+1:32.65	
69	70	Paul O'Connor	Ireland	04:33.82	+1:43.75	
70	72	Jayaram Khadka	Nepal	04:48.42	+1:58.35	
DNS	25	Axel Teichmann	Germany	DNS	DNS	
DSQ	8	Marc Mayer	Austria	DSQ	DSQ	

=== Final results ===
Rank	Bib	Name	Country	Time	Round
1st place, gold medalist(s)	6	Tor Arne Hetland	Norway	02:56.9	A Final
2nd place, silver medalist(s)	5	Peter Schlickenrieder	Germany	02:57.0	A Final
3rd place, bronze medalist(s)	2	Cristian Zorzi	Italy	02:57.2	A Final
4	9	Björn Lind	Sweden	02:58.1	A Final
5	11	Freddy Schwienbacher	Italy	02:56.1	B Final
6	4	Trond Iversen	Norway	02:56.6	B Final
7	10	Tobias Angerer	Germany	02:58.8	B Final
8	16	Hannu Manninen	Finland	02:59.5	B Final
9	3	Janusz Krężelok	Poland		Semifinal
10	8	Martin Koukal	Czech Republic		Quarterfinal
11	13	Matej Soklič	Slovenia		Quarterfinal
12	15	Markus Hasler	Liechtenstein		Quarterfinal
13	1	Håvard Bjerkeli	Norway		Quarterfinal
14	7	Silvio Fauner	Italy		Quarterfinal
15	12	Trond Einar Elden	Norway		Quarterfinal
16	DNQ	Serguey Novikov	Russia		Qualification
17	DNQ	Thobias Fredriksson	Sweden		Qualification
18	DNQ	Christoph Eigenmann	Switzerland		Qualification
19	DNQ	René Sommerfeldt	Germany		Qualification
20	DNQ	Ari Palolahti	Finland		Qualification
21	DNQ	Sami Repo	Finland		Qualification
22	DNQ	Stephan Kunz	Liechtenstein		Qualification
23	DNQ	Reinhard Neuner	Austria		Qualification
24	DNQ	Joergen Brink	Sweden		Qualification
25	DNQ	Keijo Kurttila	Finland		Qualification
26	DNQ	Roman Virolainen	Belarus		Qualification
27	DNQ	Fulvio Valbusa	Italy		Qualification
28	DNQ	Vasily Rochev	Russia		Qualification
29	DNQ	Carl Swenson	United States		Qualification
30	DNQ	Vitaly Denisov	Russia		Qualification
31	DNQ	Dmitry Tishkin	Russia		Qualification
32	DNQ	Indrek Tobreluts	Estonia		Qualification
33	DNQ	Nikolay Chebotko	Kazakhstan		Qualification
34	DNQ	Pavo Raudsepp	Estonia		Qualification
35	DNQ	Torin Koos	United States		Qualification
36	DNQ	Lars Flora	United States		Qualification
37	DNQ	Daichi Azegami	Japan		Qualification
38	DNQ	Priit Narusk	Estonia		Qualification
39	DNQ	Zoltan Tagscherer	Hungary		Qualification
40	DNQ	Lefteris Fafalis	Greece		Qualification
41	DNQ	Kris Freeman	United States		Qualification
42	DNQ	Denis Krivushkin	Kazakhstan		Qualification
43	DNQ	Donald Farley	Canada		Qualification
44	DNQ	Roman Leybyuk	Ukraine		Qualification
45	DNQ	Zsolt Antal	Romania		Qualification
46	DNQ	Masaaki Kozu	Japan		Qualification
47	DNQ	Damir Jurcevic	Croatia		Qualification
48	DNQ	Imre Tagscherer	Hungary		Qualification
49	DNQ	Vladimir Bortsov	Kazakhstan		Qualification
50	DNQ	Maxim Odnodvortsev	Kazakhstan		Qualification
51	DNQ	Dawei Han	China		Qualification
52	DNQ	Vladislavas Zybailo	Lithuania		Qualification
53	DNQ	Vadim Gusev	Lithuania		Qualification
54	DNQ	Alexij Tregobov	Belarus		Qualification
55	DNQ	Denis Vorobyov	Belarus		Qualification
56	DNQ	Sin Doo-Sun	South Korea		Qualification
57	DNQ	Aleksandr Shalak	Belarus		Qualification
58	DNQ	Slavtscho Batinkov	Bulgaria		Qualification
59	DNQ	Mátyás Holló	Hungary		Qualification
60	DNQ	Sabahattin Oglago	Turkey		Qualification
61	DNQ	Ivan Bariakov	Bulgaria		Qualification
62	DNQ	Aram Hajiyan	Armenia		Qualification
63	DNQ	Gokio Dineski	Macedonia		Qualification
64	DNQ	Philip Boit	Kenya		Qualification
65	DNQ	Isaac Menyoli	Cameroon		Qualification
66	DNQ	Prawat Nagvajara	Thailand		Qualification
67	DNQ	Arturo Kinch	Costa Rica		Qualification
68	DNQ	Paul O'Connor	Ireland		Qualification
69	DNQ	Jayaram Khadka	Nepal		Qualification
DNS	DNQ	Axel Teichmann	Germany		Qualification
DSQ	14	Peter Larsson	Sweden		Quarterfinal
DSQ	DNQ	Marc Mayer	Austria		Qualification
