= Cross-country skiing at the 2002 Winter Olympics – Men's 30 kilometre freestyle mass start =

Men's 30 kilometre freestyle at the XIX Olympic Winter Games
- Venue: Soldier Hollow
- Dates: 9 February 2002
- Competitors: 78 from 31 nations
- Winning time: 1:11:31.0

Medalists
1st place, gold medalist(s)		Christian Hoffmann; Austria
2nd place, silver medalist(s)		Mikhail Botvinov; Austria
3rd place, bronze medalist(s)		Kristen Skjeldal; Norway

The men's 30 kilometre freestyle mass start cross-country skiing competition at the 2002 Winter Olympics in Salt Lake City, United States, was held on 9 February at Soldier Hollow.

All skiers started at once, making it the first mass start in cross-country skiing in Olympic history. The defending Olympic champion was the Finnish Mika Myllylä, who won in Nagano, but the 30 kilometre event was held in an interval start and in classical style. Johann Mühlegg of Spain originally won the competition, but he failed a doping test following his gold medal win in the 50 km classical race.

== Results ==
Rank	Name	Country	Time
Gold medal	Christian Hoffmann	Austria	1:11:31.0
Silver medal	Mikhail Botvinov	Austria	1:11:32.3
Bronze medal	Kristen Skjeldal	Norway	1:11:42.7
4	Pietro Piller Cottrer	Italy	1:11:42.8
5	Ole Einar Bjørndalen	Norway	1:11:44.5
6	Lukáš Bauer	Czech Republic	1:12:22.3
7	Nikolay Bolshakov	Russia	1:12:50.6
8	Sergey Kryanin	Russia	1:12:52.0
9	Cristian Zorzi	Italy	1:13:10.0
10	Emmanuel Jonnier	France	1:13:15.1
11	Vincent Vittoz	France	1:13:21.7
12	Thomas Alsgaard	Norway	1:13:30.2
13	Fabio Maj	Italy	1:13:43.5
14	Sergey Dolidovich	Belarus	1:13:51.1
15	Vladimir Vilisov	Russia	1:13:54.1
16	René Sommerfeldt	Germany	1:13:55.8
17	Juan Jesús Gutiérrez	Spain	1:14:05.1
18	Andrey Nevzorov	Kazakhstan	1:14:12.1
19	Axel Teichmann	Germany	1:14:23.8
20	Martin Koukal	Czech Republic	1:14:25.9
21	Andrew Johnson	United States	1:14:26.9
22	Nikolay Chebotko	Kazakhstan	1:14:32.2
23	Gerhard Urain	Austria	1:14:33.9
24	Petr Michl	Czech Republic	1:14:40.0
25	Markus Hasler	Liechtenstein	1:14:47.0
26	Zsolt Antal	Romania	1:14:47.1
27	Hiroyuki Imai	Japan	1:14:55.6
28	Patrick Mächler	Switzerland	1:15:03.4
29	Dmitry Tishkin	Russia	1:15:10.2
30	Masaaki Kozu	Japan	1:15:32.4
31	Stefan Kunz	Liechtenstein	1:15:56.8
32	Martin Bajčičák	Slovakia	1:16:08.5
33	Tobias Angerer	Germany	1:16:13.1
34	Gion-Andrea Bundi	Switzerland	1:16:19.6
35	Teemu Kattilakoski	Finland	1:16:20.9
36	Niklas Jonsson	Sweden	1:16:25.2
37	Maksim Odnodvortsev	Kazakhstan	1:16:25.6
38	Wilhelm Aschwanden	Switzerland	1:16:32.4
39	Patrick Rölli	Switzerland	1:16:36.5
40	Sami Repo	Finland	1:16:48.2
41	Haritz Zunzunegui	Spain	1:17:06.5
42	Katsuhito Ebisawa	Japan	1:17:18.2
43	Jiří Magál	Czech Republic	1:17:18.3
44	Denis Vorobyov	Belarus	1:17:43.2
45	Donald Farley	Canada	1:17:43.6
46	Vladimir Bortsov	Kazakhstan	1:17:47.5
47	Alexandre Rousselet	France	1:18:01.3
48	Mitsuo Horigome	Japan	1:18:06.3
49	Tor-Arne Hetland	Norway	1:18:28.5
50	Roman Leybyuk	Ukraine	1:18:52.3
51	Silvio Fauner	Italy	1:19:49.3
52	Nikolay Semenyako	Belarus	1:19:45.6
53	Aleksandr Sannikov	Belarus	1:19:46.9
54	Lars Flora	United States	1:20:42.7
55	Park Byeong-Ju	South Korea	1:20:57.5
56	Carl Swenson	United States	1:21:17.3
57	Vladislavas Zybaila	Lithuania	1:21:27.1
58	Juris Ģērmanis	Latvia	1:22:30.4
59	Shin Doo-Sun	South Korea	1:23:03.0
60	Pavo Raudsepp	Estonia	1:23:08.3
61	Damir Jurčević	Croatia	1:23:53.3
62	Aram Hadzhiyan	Armenia	1:24:07.5
63	Vadim Gusevas	Lithuania	1:24:26.3
64	Denis Klobučar	Croatia	1:25:39.0
65	Han Dawei	China	1:25:42.4
66	Zoltán Tagscherer	Hungary	1:30:50.1
67	Ion Bucsa	Moldova	1:32:48.9
68	Gjoko Dineski	Macedonia	1:33:33.9
	Per Elofsson	Sweden	DNF
	Morgan Göransson	Sweden	DNF
	Justin Wadsworth	United States	DNF
	Sami Pietilä	Finland	DNF
	Christophe Perrillat	France	DNF
	Jeong Ui-myeong	South Korea	DNF
	Sabahattin Oğlago	Turkey	DNF
	Prawat Nagvajara	Thailand	DNF
	Johann Mühlegg	Spain	DSQ
	Achim Walcher	Austria	DSQ
