= Peter Schlickenrieder =

German cross-country skier (born 1970)

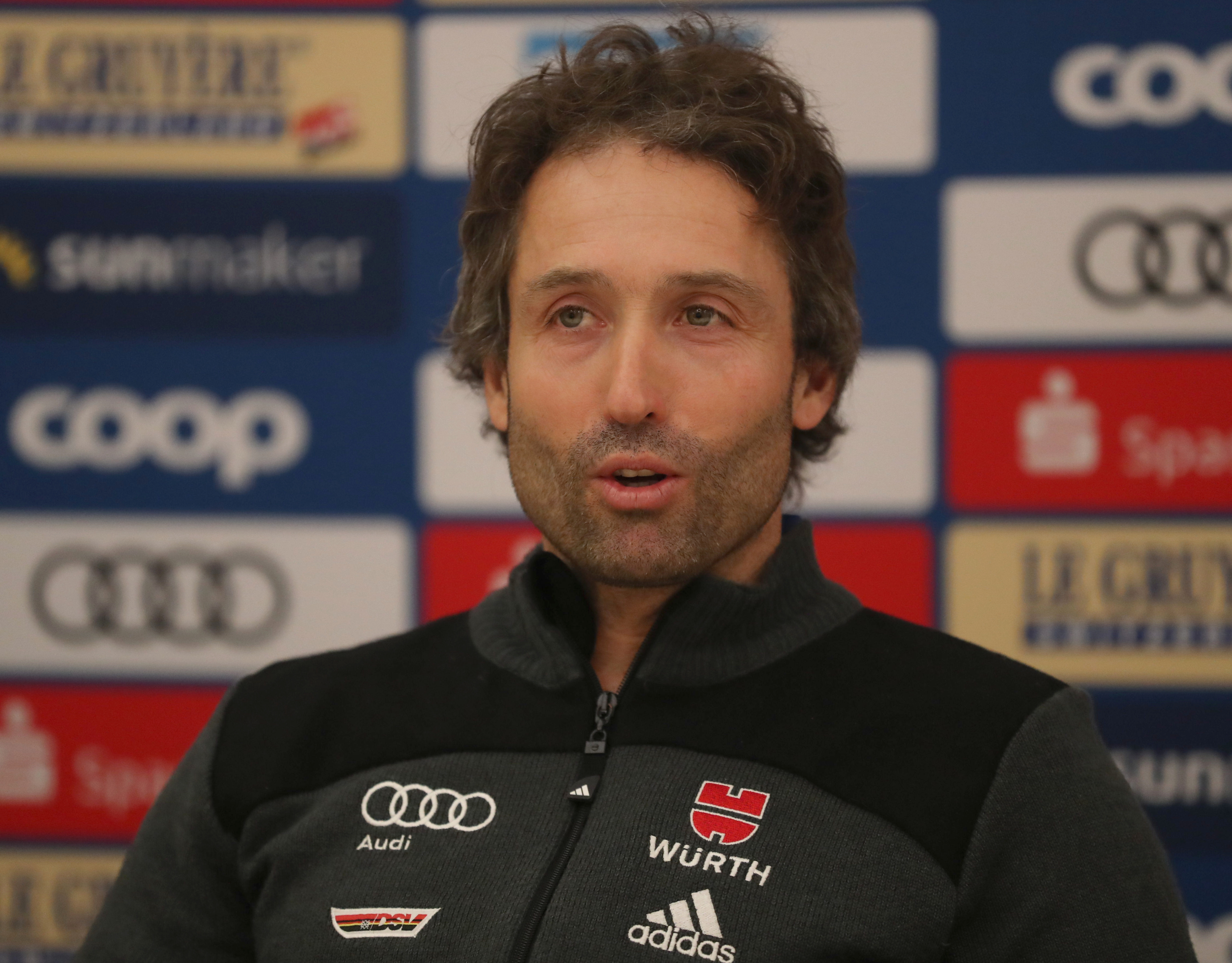
- Schlickenrieder in Dresden, 2019

Personal information
- Nationality: Germany
- Born: 16 February 1970 (age 56) Tegernsee, West Germany

Sport
- Sport: Skiing
- Club: SC Monte Kaolino Hirschau

World Cup career
- Seasons: 11 – (1992–2002)
- Indiv. starts: 51
- Indiv. podiums: 1
- Indiv. wins: 2
- Team starts: 11
- Team podiums: 2
- Team wins: 4
- Overall titles: 0 – (34th in 1999)
- Discipline titles: 0
Medal record
Men's cross-country skiing
Representing Germany
Olympic Games
| Silver medal – second place | 2002 Salt Lake City | Individual sprint |
Junior World Championships
| Bronze medal – third place | 1990 Les Saisies | 4 × 10 km relay |

Peter Schlickenrieder (born 16 February 1970 in Tegernsee) is a German cross-country skier who competed from 1992 to 2002. He earned a silver in the individual sprint at the 2002 Winter Olympics in Salt Lake City.

Schlickenrieder's best finish at the FIS Nordic World Ski Championships was a sixth in the individual sprint event in 2001. He also won seven times in FIS races and World Cup events between 1994 and 2002.

In April 2018, Schlickenrieder was appointed as head coach of the German National cross-country team. His appointment will last over the 2022 Winter Olympics.

== Cross-country skiing results ==
All results are sourced from the International Ski Federation (FIS).

=== Olympic Games ===
- 1 medal – (1 silver)

| Year | Age | 10 km | 15 km | Pursuit | 30 km | 50 km | Sprint | 4 × 10 km relay |
|---|---|---|---|---|---|---|---|---|
| 1994 | 23 | — | —N/a | — | 35 | 56 | —N/a | 4 |
| 2002 | 32 | —N/a | 55 | — | — | — | Silver | — |

=== World Championships ===
| Year | Age | 10 km | 15 km | Pursuit | 30 km | 50 km | Sprint | 4 × 10 km relay |
|---|---|---|---|---|---|---|---|---|
| 1993 | 23 | 65 | —N/a | 49 | — | — | —N/a | — |
| 1995 | 25 | — | —N/a | — | — | 23 | —N/a | 7 |
| 1997 | 27 | — | —N/a | — | 47 | — | —N/a | — |
| 2001 | 31 | —N/a | — | — | — | DNF | — | 6 |

=== World Cup ===
==== Season standings ====
| Season | Age | | | | |
| Season | Age | Overall | Long Distance | Middle Distance | Sprint |
|---|---|---|---|---|---|
| 1992 | 22 | NC | —N/a | —N/a | —N/a |
| 1993 | 23 | 50 | —N/a | —N/a | —N/a |
| 1994 | 24 | 62 | —N/a | —N/a | —N/a |
| 1995 | 25 | 48 | —N/a | —N/a | —N/a |
| 1996 | 26 | 86 | —N/a | —N/a | —N/a |
| 1997 | 27 | NC | NC | —N/a | — |
| 1998 | 28 | 41 | NC | —N/a | 28 |
| 1999 | 29 | 34 | — | —N/a | 10 |
| 2000 | 30 | 40 | — | 62 | 11 |
| 2001 | 31 | 43 | —N/a | —N/a | 17 |
| 2002 | 32 | 73 | —N/a | —N/a | 33 |

==== Individual podiums ====
- 2 victories
- 4 podiums

| No. | Season | Date | Location | Race | Level | Place |
|---|---|---|---|---|---|---|
| 1 | 1995–96 | 4 February 1996 | Reit im Winkl, Germany | 1.0 km Sprint F | World Cup | 2nd |
| 2 | 1998–99 | 10 December 1998 | Milan, Italy | 0.6 km Sprint F | World Cup | 2nd |
| 3 | 1998–99 | 29 December 1998 | Kitzbühel, Austria | 1.0 km Sprint F | World Cup | 1st |
| 4 | 1999–00 | 28 December 1999 | Garmisch-Partenkirchen, Germany | 1.0 km Sprint F | World Cup | 1st |

==== Team podiums ====
- 1 victory – (1 TS)
- 2 podiums – (2 TS)

| No. | Season | Date | Location | Race | Level | Place | Teammate |
|---|---|---|---|---|---|---|---|
| 1 | 1999–00 | 8 December 1999 | Asiago, Italy | Team Sprint F | World Cup | 1st | Angerer |
| 2 | 2000–01 | 13 December 2000 | Clusone, Italy | 10 × 1.5 km Team Sprint F | World Cup | 3rd | Sommerfeldt |
