= Sami Pietilä =

Finnish cross-country skier

Personal information
- Nationality: Finland
- Born: 20 March 1975 (age 51) Valkeakoski, Finland

Sport
- Sport: Skiing
- Club: Valkeakosken Haka

World Cup career
- Seasons: 7 – (1998–2000, 2002–2005)
- Indiv. starts: 18
- Indiv. podiums: 0
- Team starts: 8
- Team podiums: 0
- Overall titles: 0 – (62nd in 2002)
- Discipline titles: 0

Sami Pietilä (born 20 March 1975) is a Finnish cross-country skier. He represented Finland at the 2002 Winter Olympics in Salt Lake City, where he competed in the 30 km and the 50 km.

== Cross-country skiing results ==
All results are sourced from the International Ski Federation (FIS).

=== Olympic Games ===
Year	Age	15 km	Pursuit	30 km	50 km	Sprint	4 × 10 km relay
2002	26	—	46	DNF	30	—	—

=== World Cup ===
==== Season standings ====
Season	Age					
Season	Age	Overall	Distance	Long Distance	Middle Distance	Sprint
1998	23	NC	—N/a	NC	—N/a	—
1999	24	NC	—N/a	NC	—N/a	—
2000	25	NC	—N/a	NC	—	—
2002	27	62	—N/a	—N/a	—N/a	—
2003	28	NC	—N/a	—N/a	—N/a	—
2004	29	NC	NC	—N/a	—N/a	—
2005	30	122	79	—N/a	—N/a	—
