= Sergey Kriyanin =

Russian cross country skier (born 1989)

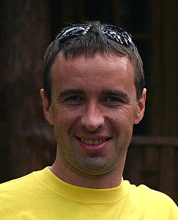
- Segey Kriyanin

Personal information
- Full name: Sergey Mikhaylovich Kriyanin
- Nationality: Russia
- Born: 9 February 1971 (age 55) Votkinsk, Soviet Union

Sport
- Sport: Skiing

World Cup career
- Seasons: 14 – (1993–2006)
- Indiv. starts: 52
- Indiv. podiums: 0
- Team starts: 9
- Team podiums: 0
- Overall titles: 0 – (41st in 1999)
- Discipline titles: 0
Medal record
Men's cross-country skiing
Representing Russia
World Championships
Bronze medal – third place	2001 Lahti	50 km freestyle
Junior World Championships
Silver medal – second place	1991 Reit im Winkl	4 × 10 km relay

Sergey Mikhaylovich Kriyanin (Russian: Сергей Михайлович Крянин; born 9 February 1971) is a Russian cross-country skier who competed between 1990 and 2006. He won a bronze medal in the 50 km event at the 2001 FIS Nordic World Ski Championships in Lahti.

Kriyanin's best finish at the Winter Olympics was an eighth in the 30 km freestyle mass start in 2002. He also won two 50 km events in his career in Russia in 1999 and 2001.

== Cross-country skiing results ==
All results are sourced from the International Ski Federation (FIS).

=== Olympic Games ===
Year	Age	10 km	15 km	Pursuit	30 km	50 km	Sprint	4 × 10 km relay
1998	27	42	—N/a	25	—	—	—N/a	5
2002	31	—N/a	—	—	8	24	—	—

=== World Championships ===
- 1 medal – (1 bronze)

Year	Age	10 km	15 km	Pursuit	30 km	50 km	Sprint	4 × 10 km relay
1999	28	—	—N/a	—	10	—	—N/a	7
2001	30	—N/a	—	—	—	Bronze	44	—
2003	32	—N/a	—	21	—	35	—	—

=== World Cup ===
==== Season standings ====
Season	Age					
Season	Age	Overall	Distance	Long Distance	Middle Distance	Sprint
1993	22	NC	—N/a	—N/a	—N/a	—N/a
1994	23	NC	—N/a	—N/a	—N/a	—N/a
1995	24	NC	—N/a	—N/a	—N/a	—N/a
1996	25	71	—N/a	—N/a	—N/a	—N/a
1997	26	NC	—N/a	NC	—N/a	—
1998	27	60	—N/a	38	—N/a	—
1999	28	41	—N/a	31	—N/a	57
2000	29	106	—N/a	61	—	—
2001	30	56	—N/a	—N/a	—N/a	NC
2002	31	137	—N/a	—N/a	—N/a	NC
2003	32	112	—N/a	—N/a	—N/a	—
2004	33	NC	—	—N/a	—N/a	—
2005	34	NC	—	—N/a	—N/a	—
2006	35	NC	—	—N/a	—N/a	—
