= Paul O'Connor =

Paul O'Connor may refer to:

- Paul O'Connor (American football) (born 1962), American football player
- Paul O'Connor (Gaelic footballer), Irish Gaelic footballer
- Paul O'Connor (skier), Irish skier
- Paul O'Connor (hurler) (1963–2012), Irish hurler
- Paul O'Connor, see John F. Kennedy assassination conspiracy theories
- Paul O'Connor, founder of Trouble Brewing

== See also ==
- Paul Connor (disambiguation)
