= Tishkin =

Tishkin may refer to:

- Dmitri Tishkin, Russian Olympic swimmer
- Maksim Tishkin (b. 1981), Russian footballer
- Tishkin, alternate name of Tashkan-e Sadat, a village in Iran
