= Hollai =

Hollai, Hollay is Hungarian surname:

- Camilla von Hollay (Hungarian: Hollay Kamilla; 1899–1967), a Hungarian film actress of the silent era
- Imre Hollai (1925–2017), a Hungarian politician

== See also ==
- Holló
