= Matej Soklič =

Slovenian cross-country skier

Personal information
- Nationality: Slovenian
- Born: 15 June 1973 (age 51); Bled, Yugoslavia

Sport
- Sport: Cross-country skiing

Matej Soklič (born 15 June 1973) is a Slovenian cross-country skier who competed in the men's sprint event at the 2002 Winter Olympics.
