= Paul Connor =

Paul Connor may refer to:

- Paul Connor (Coronation Street), fictional character on a soap opera
- Paul Connor Jr., fictional character on British soap opera Coronation Street, nephew of the above
- Paul Connor (footballer) (born 1979), English professional footballer

== See also ==
- Paul O'Connor (disambiguation)
- Paul Connors, Canadian politician
