= Marc Mayer (skier) =

Austrian cross-country skier

Personal information
- Nationality: Austrian
- Born: 18 July 1978 (age 46); Salzburg, Austria

Sport
- Sport: Cross-country skiing

Marc Mayer (born 18 July 1978) is an Austrian cross-country skier. He competed in the men's sprint event at the 2002 Winter Olympics.
