= Holló =

Holló is a Hungarian language surname from the Hungarian word for raven. Notable people with the name include:

- Balázs Holló (1999), Hungarian swimmer
- Mátyás Holló (1977), Hungarian cross-country skier
- Miklós Holló (1943), Hungarian cross-country skier
