= Cameroon at the 2002 Winter Olympics =

- IOC code: CMR
- NOC: Cameroon Olympic and Sports Committee
- Website: www.cnosc.org (in French)

in Salt Lake City
- Competitors: 1 in 1 sport
- Flag bearer: Isaac Menyoli
- Medals: Gold 0 Silver 0 Bronze 0 Total 0

Winter Olympics appearances (overview)
- 2002; 2006–2022; 2026; 2030

Cameroon sent a delegation to compete at the 2002 Winter Olympics in Salt Lake City, United States from 8–24 February 2002. This was the nation's first appearance at a Winter Olympic Games. Cameroon sent only one representative, cross-country skier Isaac Menyoli. He finished the sprint in 65th place and the 2 × 10 kilometre pursuit in 80th position.

== Background ==
The Cameroon Olympic and Sports Committee was recognised by the International Olympic Committee on 31 December 1962. The country began participating in Summer Olympics soon after, in 1964, and have participated in every Summer Olympics since. Salt Lake City was Cameroon's first appearance at a Winter Olympic Games. The 2002 Winter Olympics were held from 8–24 February 2002; a total of 2,399 athletes representing 77 National Olympic Committees took part. Cameroon sent one athlete to the Salt Lake City Olympics, cross-country skier Isaac Menyoli. He was selected as the flag bearer for the opening ceremony while a ceremony volunteer carried the Cameroonian flag for the closing ceremony.

== Cross-country skiing ==
Isaac Menyoli was 29 years old at the time of the Salt Lake City Olympics, and was dedicated to use his Olympic participation to promote the cause of AIDS education in his native country. He was living in Wisconsin, and took up skiing in earnest only the year before, and competed successfully in five qualifying races. About Cameroon, Menyoli said "My friends think it is very stupid; we celebrate the Summer Olympics at home but the Winter Olympics are unheard of," On 14 February, he took part in the 2 × 10 kilometre pursuit, finishing the first classical 10 kilometres in 45 minutes and 40.3 seconds, ranking 80th and last. Only the top 60 were allowed to proceed to the second 10 kilometre freestyle portion, and Menyoli was eliminated, the slowest qualifying time being 29 minutes and 4.6 seconds. Five days later, on 19 February, he was a competitor in the sprint, finishing the qualifying round in a time of 4 minutes and 10.07 seconds. Only the top 16 could advance to the next round, and he was again eliminated; the slowest qualifying time was 2 minutes and 53.87 seconds. He ended the event in 65th place out of 69 classified finishers.

Athlete	Event	Race	
Athlete	Event	Time	Rank
Isaac Menyoli	2 × 10 kilometre pursuit	45:40.3	80

Sprint

Athlete	Event	Qualifying		Quarterfinal		Semifinal		Final	
Athlete	Event	Total	Rank	Total	Rank	Total	Rank	Total	Rank
Isaac Menyoli	Sprint	4:10.07	65	Did not advance					66
