= Pavo Raudsepp =

Estonian cross-country skier (born 1973)

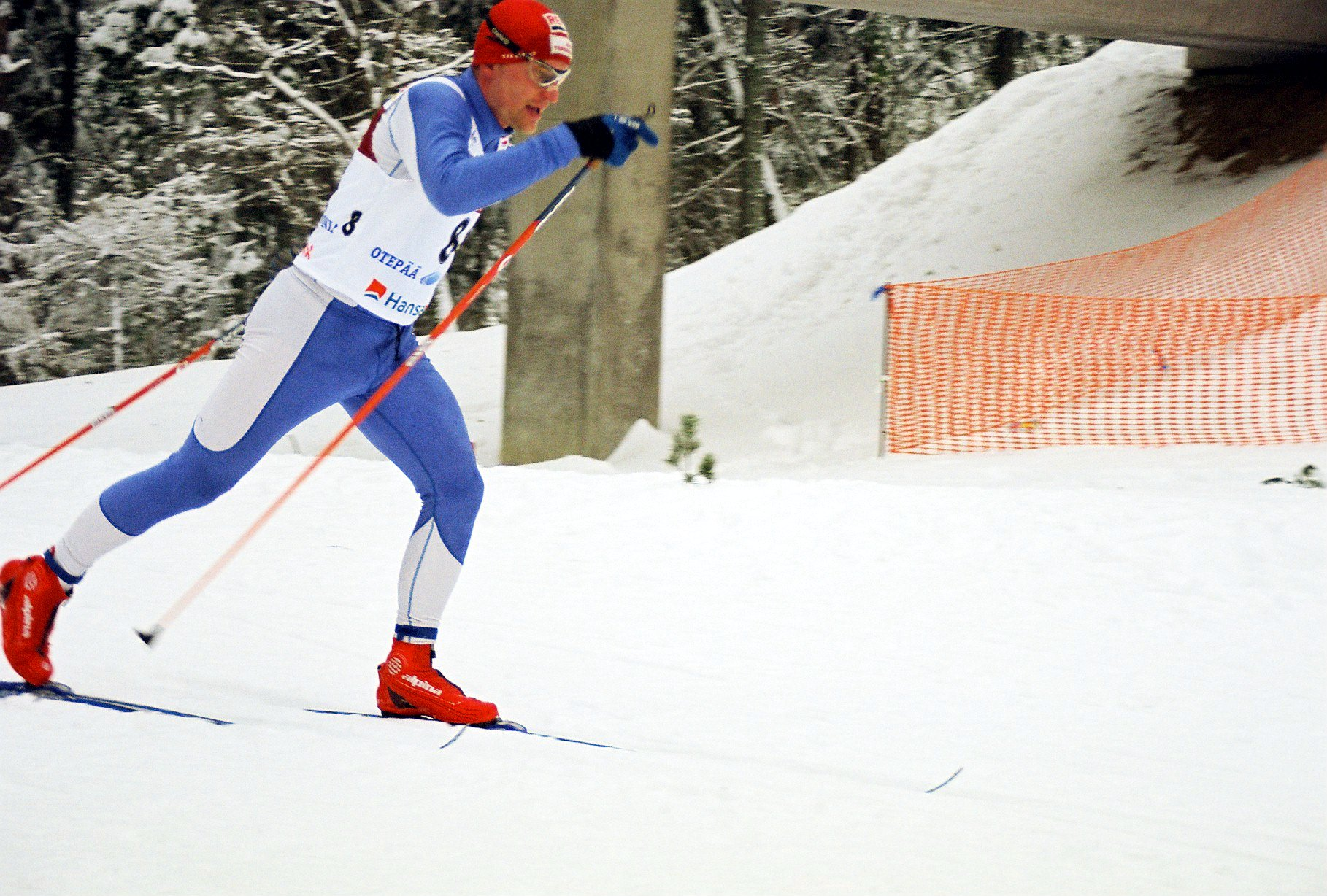
- Pavo Raudsepp in 2006

Personal information
- Nationality: Estonian
- Born: 9 October 1973 (age 51); Koeru, Estonia

Sport
- Sport: Cross-country skiing

Pavo Raudsepp (born 9 October 1973) is an Estonian cross-country skier. He competed in the men's sprint event at the 2002 Winter Olympics.
