= Denis Vorobyov =

Belarusian cross-country skier (born 1979)

Personal information
- Nationality: Belarusian
- Born: 2 January 1979 (age 46)

Sport
- Sport: Cross-country skiing

Denis Vorobyov (born 2 January 1979) is a Belarusian cross-country skier. He competed in the men's sprint event at the 2002 Winter Olympics.
