= Isaac Menyoli =

Cameroonian architect and skier (born 1972)

Isaac Menyoli (born 6 August 1972) is a Cameroonian architect and skier who was the first person to represent his country at the Winter Olympic Games when he took part in the 2002 Winter Olympics in Salt Lake City. He competed in the men's classical 10 km race in cross-country skiing, finishing 80th and last with a time of 45:40.3. He also took part in the 1.5 km sprint, where he finished 67th out of 71, with a time of 4:10.07, just behind Philip Boit of Kenya.

The Australian Broadcasting Corporation reported that he had been "voted the day's best Olympian overnight", and described him as a Winter Olympics' version of Eric the Eel.

Menyoli's stated aim as a competitor was not to win a medal, but to attract media attention (as a Cameroonian skier) so as to speak up, in front of a global audience, about the prevalence of AIDS in his country, and specifically in his home town of Buea.

Menyoli explained that many people in Buea were not convinced of the threat posed by AIDS and that he hoped to persuade them by being interviewed during an international event. "I want to ski for a reason. I want to tell people that they really have to watch out, that AIDS is serious."

Olympic Games
Preceded by Cécile Ngambi	Flagbearer for Cameroon; Salt Lake City 2002	Succeeded by Vencelas Dabaya
