= Kazakhstan at the 2002 Winter Olympics =

- IOC code: KAZ
- NOC: National Olympic Committee of the Republic of Kazakhstan
- Website: www.olympic.kz (in Kazakh, Russian, and English)

in Salt Lake City
- Competitors: 50 (20 men, 30 women) in 7 sports
- Flag bearer: Radik Bikchentayev (speed skating)
- Medals: Gold 0 Silver 0 Bronze 0 Total 0

Winter Olympics appearances (overview)
- 1994; 1998; 2002; 2006; 2010; 2014; 2018; 2022; 2026; 2030

Other related appearances
- Soviet Union (1956–1988); Unified Team (1992)

Kazakhstan competed at the 2002 Winter Olympics in Salt Lake City, United States.

== Alpine skiing ==
Men

Athlete	Event	Race 1	Race 2	Total	
Athlete	Event	Time	Time	Time	Rank
Danil Anisimov	Giant Slalom	1:21.40	1:19.21	2:40.61	53
Danil Anisimov	Slalom	DNF	–	DNF	–

Women

Athlete	Event	Race 1	Race 2	Total	
Athlete	Event	Time	Time	Time	Rank
Olesya Persidskaya	Giant Slalom	DNF	–	DNF	–
Olesya Persidskaya	Slalom	1:03.98	1:05.99	2:09.97	34

== Biathlon ==
Men

Event	Athlete	Misses ^{1}	Time	Rank
10 km sprint	Dmitry Pantov	5	29:46.3	79

Event	Athlete	Time	Misses	Adjusted time ^{3}	Rank
20 km	Dmitry Pantov	54:32.8	3	57:32.8	49

Women

Event	Athlete	Misses ^{1}	Time	Rank
7.5 km sprint	Yelena Dubok	1	24:50.1	62
10 km pursuit ^{4}	Yelena Dubok	2	34:41.5	30

Event	Athlete	Time	Misses	Adjusted time ^{3}	Rank
15 km	Yelena Dubok	52:32.5	5	57:32.5	60

^{1} A penalty loop of 150 metres had to be skied per missed target.
^{3} One minute added per missed target.
^{4} Starting delay based on 7.5 km sprint results.

== Cross-country skiing ==
Men

Sprint

Athlete	Qualifying round		Quarterfinals		Semifinals		Finals	
Athlete	Time	Rank	Time	Rank	Time	Rank	Time	Final rank
Maksim Odnodvortsev	3:06.83	51	did not advance					
Vladimir Bortsov	3:06.03	50	did not advance					
Denis Krivushkin	3:02.73	43	did not advance					
Nikolay Chebotko	3:00.31	34	did not advance					

Pursuit

Athlete	10 km C		10 km F pursuit^{1}	
Athlete	Time	Rank	Time	Final rank
Denis Krivushkin	28:22.0	49 Q	26:57.7	48
Nikolay Chebotko	27:50.0	37 Q	25:56.5	39
Andrey Nevzorov	27:14.3	24 Q	24:27.7	15
Andrey Golovko	26:45.8	10 Q	24:48.9	21

Event	Athlete	Race	
Event	Athlete	Time	Rank
15 km C	Igor Zubrilin	41:15.5	44
15 km C	Pavel Ryabinin	41:03.2	42
15 km C	Denis Krivushkin	40:27.7	37
15 km C	Andrey Golovko	39:28.1	18
30 km F	Vladimir Bortsov	1'17:47.5	46
30 km F	Maksim Odnodvortsev	1'16:25.6	37
30 km F	Nikolay Chebotko	1'14:32.2	22
30 km F	Andrey Nevzorov	1'14:12.1	18
50 km C	Igor Zubrilin	2'20:25.7	35
50 km C	Maksim Odnodvortsev	2'19:50.3	34
50 km C	Andrey Golovko	2'16:42.2	23
50 km C	Andrey Nevzorov	2'13:53.1	13

^{1} Starting delay based on 10 km C. results.
C = Classical style, F = Freestyle

4 × 10 km relay

Athletes	Race	
Athletes	Time	Rank
Andrey Golovko; Pavel Ryabinin; Nikolay Chebotko; Andrey Nevzorov	1'38:20.8	14

Women

Sprint

Athlete	Qualifying round		Quarterfinals		Semifinals		Finals	
Athlete	Time	Rank	Time	Rank	Time	Rank	Time	Final rank
Dariya Starostina	3:41.69	53	did not advance					
Nataliya Isachenko	3:39.09	51	did not advance					

Pursuit

Athlete	5 km C		5 km F pursuit^{2}	
Athlete	Time	Rank	Time	Final rank
Svetlana Deshevykh	14:16.2	39 Q	14:09.5	43
Yelena Volodina-Antonova	14:06.6	31 Q	14:23.6	47
Svetlana Shishkina-Malakhova	14:00.6	26 Q	13:16.8	24
Oksana Yatskaya	13:48.3	14 Q	13:10.8	15

Event	Athlete	Race	
Event	Athlete	Time	Rank
10 km C	Svetlana Deshevykh	30:39.2	33
10 km C	Yelena Volodina-Antonova	30:27.3	29
10 km C	Oksana Yatskaya	30:13.9	24
10 km C	Svetlana Shishkina-Malakhova	30:06.7	21
15 km F	Nataliya Isachenko	45:51.4	49
15 km F	Dariya Starostina	45:28.8	45
15 km F	Svetlana Shishkina-Malakhova	43:05.1	33
15 km F	Oksana Yatskaya	42:46.0	25
30 km C	Svetlana Deshevykh	1'46:18.1	37
30 km C	Yelena Volodina-Antonova	1'43:37.6	32
30 km C	Oksana Yatskaya	1'37:25.3	17
30 km C	Svetlana Shishkina-Malakhova	1'37:14.5	16

^{2} Starting delay based on 5 km C. results.
C = Classical style, F = Freestyle

4 × 5 km relay

Athletes	Race	
Athletes	Time	Rank
Svetlana Deshevykh; Yelena Volodina-Antonova; Oksana Yatskaya; Svetlana Shishkina-Malakhova	51:52.2	11

== Freestyle skiing ==
Men

Athlete	Event	Qualification			Final		
Athlete	Event	Time	Points	Rank	Time	Points	Rank
Aleksey Bannikov	Moguls	31.99	22.14	24	did not advance		

== Ice hockey ==
=== Women's tournament ===
==== Group stage - group A ====
Top two teams (shaded) advanced to semifinals.

Team	GP	W	L	T	GF	GA	GD	Pts
Canada	3	3	0	0	25	0	+25	6
Sweden	3	2	1	0	10	13	−3	4
Russia	3	1	2	0	6	11	−5	2
Kazakhstan	3	0	3	0	1	18	−17	0

All times are local (UTC-7).

11 February 2002; 11:00	Canada	7–0 (3–0, 2–0, 2–0)	Kazakhstan	E Center, West Valley City; Attendance: 7,321

13 February 2002; 14:00	Sweden	7–0 (3–0, 2–0, 2–0)	Kazakhstan	Peaks Ice Arena, Provo; Attendance: 5,349

15 February 2002; 14:00	Kazakhstan	1–4 (1–1, 0–2, 0–1)	Russia	Peaks Ice Arena, Provo; Attendance: 5,618

==== Classification round ====
Fifth place semifinal

17 February 2002; 21:00	Germany	4–0 (1–0, 3–0, 0–0)	Kazakhstan	E Center, West Valley City; Attendance: 7,773

7th place match

19 February 2002; 14:00	China	2–1 OT (1–0, 0–0, 0–1, 1–0)	Kazakhstan 8th	Peaks Ice Arena, Provo; Attendance: 5,490

- Team roster

- Viktoriya Adyeva
- Lyubov Alekseyeva
- Antonida Asonova
- Dinara Dikambayeva
- Tatyana Khlyzova
- Olga Konysheva
- Olga Kryukova
- Nadezhda Loseva
- Svetlana Maltseva
- Yekaterina Maltseva
- Olga Potapova
- Viktoriya Sazonova
- Yelena Shtelmayster
- Yuliya Solovyova
- Oksana Taykevich
- Nataliya Trunova
- Lyubov Vafina
- Svetlana Vasina
- Nataliya Yakovchuk

== Ski jumping ==
Athlete	Event	Qualifying jump			Final jump 1			Final jump 2		Total	
Athlete	Event	Distance	Points	Rank	Distance	Points	Rank	Distance	Points	Points	Rank
Aleksandr Korobov	Normal hill	80.5	90.5	38 Q	78.0	85.5	48	did not advance			
Pavel Gayduk	Normal hill	80.5	92.0	35 Q	82.5	96.5	44	did not advance			
Maksim Polunin	Normal hill	87.0	106.5	24 Q	85.5	103.5	38	did not advance			
Stanislav Filimonov	Normal hill	89.0	111.5	16 Q	89.0	111.5	28 Q	83.5	98.0	209.5	32
Aleksandr Korobov	Large hill	96.5	65.2	46	did not advance						
Pavel Gayduk	Large hill	101.5	76.2	38	did not advance						
Maksim Polunin	Large hill	109.0	92.2	28 Q	104.5	83.1	48	did not advance			
Stanislav Filimonov	Large hill	111.0	96.3	25 Q	120.5	114.9	21 Q	105.0	82.5	197.4	30

Men's team large hill

Athletes	Result	
Athletes	Points ^{1}	Rank
Maksim Polunin; Stanislav Filimonov; Aleksandr Korobov; Pavel Gayduk	621.1	13

^{1} Four teams members performed two jumps each.

== Speed skating ==
Men

Event	Athlete	Race	
Event	Athlete	Time	Rank
1000 m	Sergey Tsybenko	1:10.13	27
1500 m	Vladimir Kostin	1:49.57	39
1500 m	Nikolay Uliyanin	1:49.42	36
1500 m	Radik Bikchentayev	1:47.04	19
1500 m	Sergey Tsybenko	1:46.40	16
5000 m	Vladimir Kostin	6:44.10	31
5000 m	Sergey Ilyushchenko	6:38.09	29
5000 m	Radik Bikchentayev	6:31.47	19

Women

Event	Athlete	Race	
Event	Athlete	Time	Rank
1000 m	Lyudmila Prokasheva	1:18.19	28
1500 m	Marina Pupina	2:05.13	37
1500 m	Anzhelika Gavrilova	2:03.22	32
3000 m	Anzhelika Gavrilova	4:20.36	28
3000 m	Marina Pupina	4:20.04	27
3000 m	Lyudmila Prokasheva	4:09.74	16
5000 m	Lyudmila Prokasheva	DNF	–
