= Dmitry Tishkin =

Russian cross-country skier

Personal information
- Nationality: Russian
- Born: 5 February 1980 (age 45); Shushenskoye, Russia

Sport
- Sport: Cross-country skiing

Dmitry Tishkin (born 5 February 1980) is a Russian cross-country skier. He competed in the men's sprint event at the 2002 Winter Olympics.
