= Mátyás Holló =

Hungarian cross-country skier (born 1977)

Personal information
- Nationality: Hungarian
- Born: 14 May 1977 (age 47); Jászberény, Hungary

Sport
- Sport: Cross-country skiing

Mátyás Holló (born 14 May 1977) is a Hungarian cross-country skier. He competed in the men's sprint event at the 2002 Winter Olympics.
