= Maechler =

Maechler or Mächler is a surname. Notable people with the surname include:

- Daniel Maechler (born 1974), Swiss skeleton racer
- Erich Maechler (born 1960), Swizz cyclist
- Pat Mächler (born 1983), Swiss politician, co-founder of Pirate Parties International
- Patrick Mächler (born 1972), Swiss cross-country skier
- Stefan Maechler, Swiss historian
