= Paul O'Connor (skier) =

Irish skier (born 1959)

Paul O'Connor (born 1 January 1959) is an Irish skier, who competed in the 2002 Winter Olympics. Despite being from Ireland, originally County Cork, he lives in Provo, Utah, and is a practicing Mormon. During the Olympics, he came 69th out of 72 in his race, at the cross-country skiing. Being aged 43 during the Olympics, he was one of the oldest ever competitors in the sport.

O'Connor is a convert to the Church of Jesus Christ of Latter-day Saints and is married with one daughter.
