= Damir Jurčević =

Croatian cross-country skier (born 1978)

Personal information
- Nationality: Croatian
- Born: 19 November 1978 (age 46); Rijeka, Yugoslavia

Sport
- Sport: Cross-country skiing

Damir Jurčević (born 19 November 1978) is a Croatian cross-country skier. He competed at the 2002 Winter Olympics and the 2006 Winter Olympics.
