= Han Dawei =

Chinese cross-country skier (born 1977)

Personal information
- Nationality: Chinese
- Born: 6 October 1977 (age 47); Heilongjiang, China

Sport
- Sport: Cross-country skiing

Han Dawei (born 6 October 1977) is a Chinese cross-country skier. He competed at the 2002 Winter Olympics and the 2006 Winter Olympics.
