= Zoltán Tagscherer =

Hungarian cross country skier (born 1976)

Zoltán Tagscherer (born May 13, 1976) is a Hungarian cross-country skier, born in Budapest, who has competed since 2001. Competing in three Winter Olympics, he finished 39th in the individual sprint at Salt Lake City in 2002.

Tagscherer's best finish at the FIS Nordic World Ski Championships was 16th in the team sprint event at Sapporo in 2007 while his best individual finish was 39th in an individual sprint event at Lahti in 2001.

His best World Cup finish was 30th in a 15 km event at China in 2007.
