= Donald Farley (skier) =

Canadian cross-country skier

Donald Farley (4 June 1970 – 19 November 2016) was a Canadian cross-country skier who competed for his home nation in the 1998 Winter Olympics and in the 2002 Winter Olympics.
