= Vadim Gusev =

Private military company owner

Vadim Gusev is a Russian mercenary leader and the former head of Slavonic Corps, a private military company based in Hong Kong. He once worked for RusCorps and was one of the top managers of the private military company Moran Security Group.

Since the late 2000s, he has been one of the top managers of the Russian private military company Moran Security Group, which is the predecessor of the Wagner Group. In 2013, he and Yevgeny Sidorov created the Slavonic Corps, a mercenary unit, to fight in Syria. The FSB interrogated and ultimately charged Gusev with a violation of Article 359 of the Russian Criminal Code, over his role in Syrian civil war.

Gusev was ultimately jailed in October 2014. He faced up to eight years imprisonment but received a three-year sentence. Regular squad members were reportedly unpaid and faced no prosecution in Russia.

After his release from prison, Gusev headed the private military company Longifolia from 2014 to 2017.
