= Vladislavas Zybaila =

Lithuanian cross-country skier (born 1975)

Personal information
- Nationality: Lithuanian
- Born: 17 January 1975 (age 51) Vilnius, Lithuanian SSR, Soviet Union

Sport
- Sport: Cross-country skiing

Vladislavas Zybaila (born 17 January 1975) is a Lithuanian cross-country skier. He competed at the 1998 Winter Olympics and the 2002 Winter Olympics.
