= Shin Doo-sun =

South Korean cross-country skier

Personal information
- Nationality: South Korean
- Born: 9 May 1976 (age 48); Jumunjin, South Korea

Sport
- Sport: Cross-country skiing

Shin Doo-sun (born 9 May 1976) is a South Korean cross-country skier. He competed at the 1998 Winter Olympics and the 2002 Winter Olympics.
