= Vladimir Bortsov =

Kazakhstani cross-country skier (born 1974)

Medal record

Men's cross-country skiing

Representing Kazakhstan

Asian Winter Games
Gold medal – first place	1996 Harbin	4×10 km relay
Silver medal – second place	1996 Harbin	10 km
Bronze medal – third place	1996 Harbin	15 km

Vladimir Bortsov (born 1974) is a Kazakhstani cross-country skier. He competed at the Winter Olympics in 1998 in Nagano, and in 2002 in Salt Lake City.
