= Denis Krivushkin =

Kazakhstani cross-country skier (born 1978)

Denis Krivushkin (Денис Владимирович Кривушкин, born 22 August 1978) is a Kazakhstani cross-country skier. He competed at the Winter Olympics in 2002 in Salt Lake City, and in Turin in 2006.
