= 2002 Winter Olympics =

Multi-sport event in Salt Lake City, Utah, US

XIX Olympic Winter Games
- Emblem of the 2002 Winter Olympics (Note: The emblem combines a snow crystal and a sun rising over a mountain. The yellow, orange, and blue colors represent the varied Utah landscape.)
- Location: Salt Lake City, United States
- Motto: Light the Fire Within
- Nations: 78
- Athletes: 2,409 (1,523 men, 886 women)
- Events: 78 in 7 sports (15 disciplines)
- Opening: February 8, 2002
- Closing: February 24, 2002
- Opened by: President George W. Bush
- Closed by: IOC President Jacques Rogge
- Cauldron: Members of the 1980 U.S. Olympic hockey team, led by team captain Mike Eruzione
- Stadium: Rice–Eccles Stadium

The 2002 Winter Olympics, officially the XIX Olympic Winter Games and commonly known as Salt Lake 2002 (Arapaho: Niico'ooowu' 2002; Gosiute Shoshoni: Tit'-so-pi 2002; Navajo: Sooléí 2002; Shoshoni: Soónkahni 2002), were an international winter multi-sport event that was held from February 8 to 24, 2002, in and around Salt Lake City, Utah, United States.

Salt Lake City was selected as the host city in June 1995 at the 104th IOC Session. They were the eighth Olympics to be hosted by the United States, and the most recent to be held in the country until 2028, when Los Angeles hosts the Games of the XXXIV Olympiad. The 2002 Winter Olympics and Paralympics were both organized by the Salt Lake Organizing Committee (SLOC), the first time that both events were organized by a single committee, and inspiring other Olympic and Paralympic Games to be organized by such since then. These were the first Olympic Games under the International Olympic Committee (IOC) presidency of Jacques Rogge.

The Games featured 2,399 athletes from 78 nations, participating in 78 events in 15 disciplines. Norway topped the medal table, with 13 gold and 25 medals overall, while Germany finished with the most total medals, winning 36 (with 12 of them gold). The hosting United States was third by gold medals and second by overall medals, with 10 and 34 respectively. Australia notably became the first Southern Hemisphere country to ever win gold medals at the Winter Olympics.

The Games finished with a budgetary surplus of US$40 million; the surplus was used to fund the formation of the Utah Athletic Foundation—which has continued to maintain the facilities built for these Olympics. The venues have continued to be used for national and international winter sports events after the Olympics, leading to the Winter Olympics return to Salt Lake City for the 2034 games, 32 years after the city played host in 2002.

== Host city selection ==
Salt Lake City was chosen over Québec City, Canada; Sion, Switzerland; and Östersund, Sweden, on June 16, 1995, at the 104th IOC Session in Budapest, Hungary. Salt Lake City had previously come in second during the bids for the 1998 Winter Olympics, awarded to Nagano, Japan, and had offered to be the provisional host of the 1976 Winter Olympics when the original host, Denver, Colorado, withdrew. The 1976 Winter Olympics were ultimately awarded to Innsbruck, Austria.

There was a scandal involving allegations of bribery used to win the rights to the Games. Prior to its successful bid, Salt Lake City had attempted four times to secure the games, failing each time. In 1998, members of the International Olympic Committee (IOC) were accused of taking gifts from the Salt Lake Organizing Committee (SLOC) during the bidding process. The allegations resulted in the expulsion of several IOC members and the adoption of new IOC rules. Although nothing strictly illegal had been done, it was felt that the acceptance of the gifts was morally dubious. In addition, legal charges were brought against the leaders of Salt Lake's bid committee by the United States Department of Justice. Investigations were also launched into prior bidding process by other cities, finding that members of the IOC received bribes during the bidding process for both the 1998 Winter Olympics and 2000 Summer Olympics. In response to the scandal, Mitt Romney was hired as the new president and CEO of the Salt Lake Organizing Committee in February 1999.

2002 Winter Olympics bidding result
City	Country	Round 1
Salt Lake City	United States	54
Östersund	Sweden	14
Sion	Switzerland	14
Quebec City	Canada	7

== Development and preparation ==
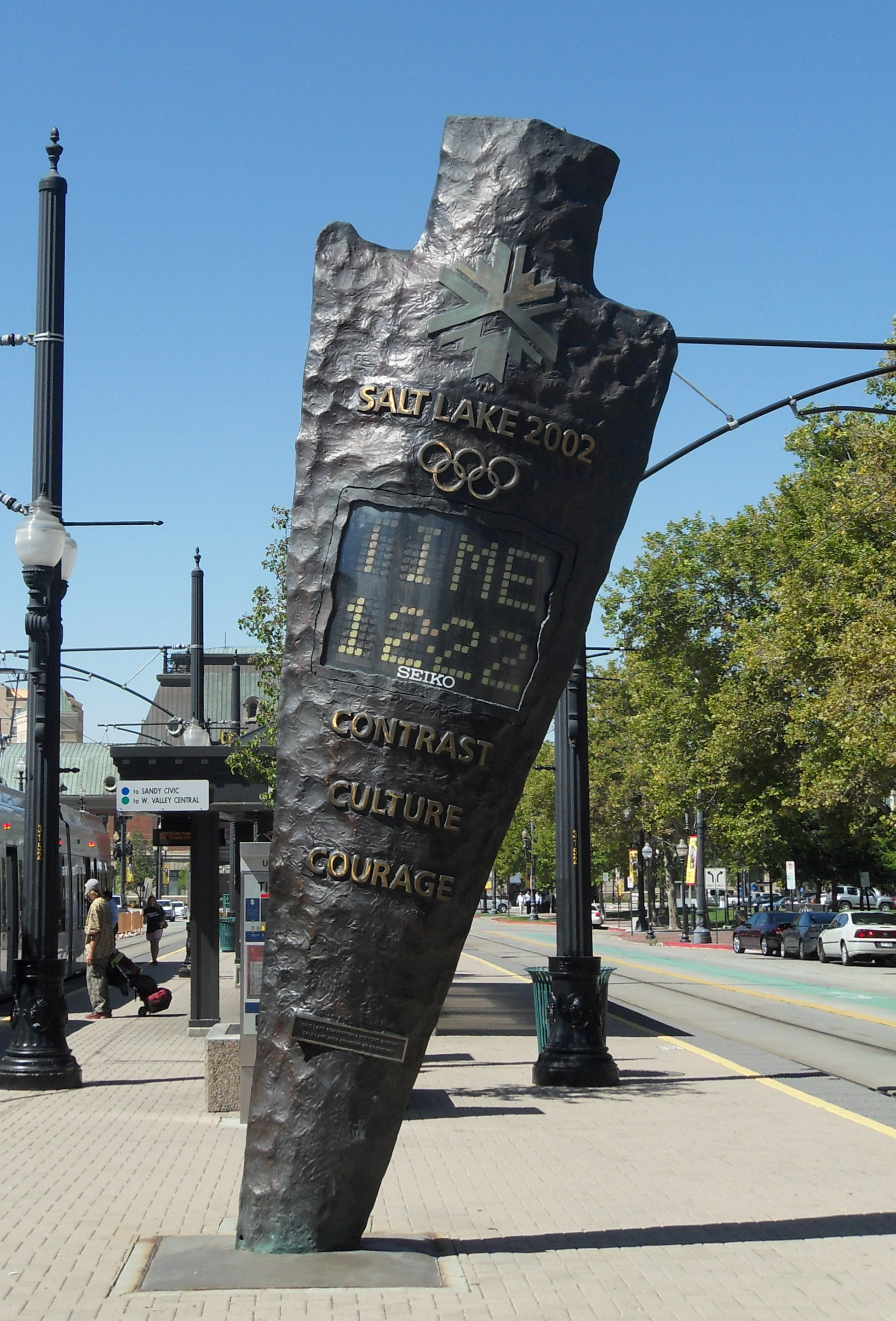
Countdown clock used for the games in the shape of an arrowhead

=== Budget ===
In February 1999, in response to the bid scandal and a financial shortfall for the Games, Mitt Romney, then CEO of the private equity firm Bain Capital (and future U.S. presidential candidate, U.S. Senator, and Governor of Massachusetts), was hired as the new president and CEO of the Salt Lake Organizing Committee. Romney, Kem C. Gardner, a Utah commercial real estate developer, and Don Stirling, the Olympics' local marketing chief, raised "millions of dollars from Mormon families with pioneer roots: the Eccles family, whose forebears were important industrialists and bankers" to help rescue the Games, according to a later report. An additional US$410 million was received from the federal government. U.S. federal subsidies amounted to $1.3 billion (for infrastructure improvements only), compared to $45 billion of federal funding received by the organizing committee of the 2014 Winter Olympics from the Russian government. The Games were financially successful, raising more money with fewer sponsors than any prior Olympic Games, which left SLOC with a surplus of $40 million. The surplus was used to create the Utah Athletic Foundation, which maintains and operates many of the remaining Olympic venues.

The Oxford Olympics Study established the outturn cost of the Salt Lake City 2002 Winter Olympics at US$2.5 billion in 2015-dollars and cost overrun at 24% in real terms. This includes sports-related costs only, that is, (i) operational costs incurred by the organizing committee to stage the Games, e.g., expenditures for technology, transportation, workforce, administration, security, catering, ceremonies, and medical services, and (ii) direct capital costs incurred by the host city and country or private investors to build, e.g., the competition venues, the Olympic village, international broadcast center, and media and press center, which are required to host the Games. Indirect capital costs are not included, such as for road, rail, or airport infrastructure, or for hotel upgrades or other business investment incurred in preparation for the Games but not directly related to staging the Games. The cost and cost overrun for Salt Lake City 2002 compares with costs of US$2.5 billion and a cost overrun of 13% for Vancouver 2010, and costs of US$51 billion and a cost overrun of 289% for Sochi 2014, the latter being the most costly Olympics to date. The average cost for Winter Games since 1960 is US$3.1 billion, average cost overrun is 142%.

=== Security ===
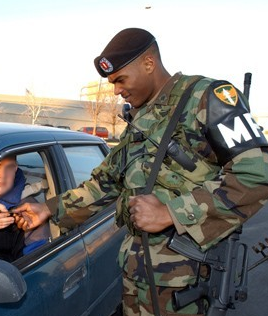
Spc. Patrick Jean-Mary, of Warwick, R.I., inspects two forms of identification during the 2002 Winter Olympic Games in Salt Lake City

The 2002 Winter Games were the first Olympic Games to take place since the September 11 attacks, which meant a higher level of security than ever before provided for the games. As a result, the Office of Homeland Security (OHS) designated the Olympics a National Special Security Event (NSSE). Aerial surveillance and radar control was provided by the U.S. Marines of Marine Air Control Squadron 2, Detachment C, from Cherry Point, North Carolina. The FBI and NSA arranged with Qwest Communications to use intercept equipment for a period of less than six months around the time of the 2002 Winter Olympics.

=== Transportation ===
The largest public transport project completed for the Games was the TRAX light rail system, which first began operations ahead of the Games in 1999. The system had two operational lines during the Games to provide service to Downtown Salt Lake City and Rice–Eccles Stadium on the University of Utah campus. The local organizing committee also organized 1,000 buses to transport athletes, workers, and spectators between venues; 3,800 transit bus drivers and mechanics were recruited from across the United States to run the system.

To help reduce vehicle traffic to Soldier Hollow, and to provide a tourist attraction for attendees, Heber Valley Railroad offered service to Wasatch Mountain State Park on steam locomotives during the Games. After arriving, passengers then embarked to Soldier Hollow on horse-drawn sleighs.

=== Venues ===
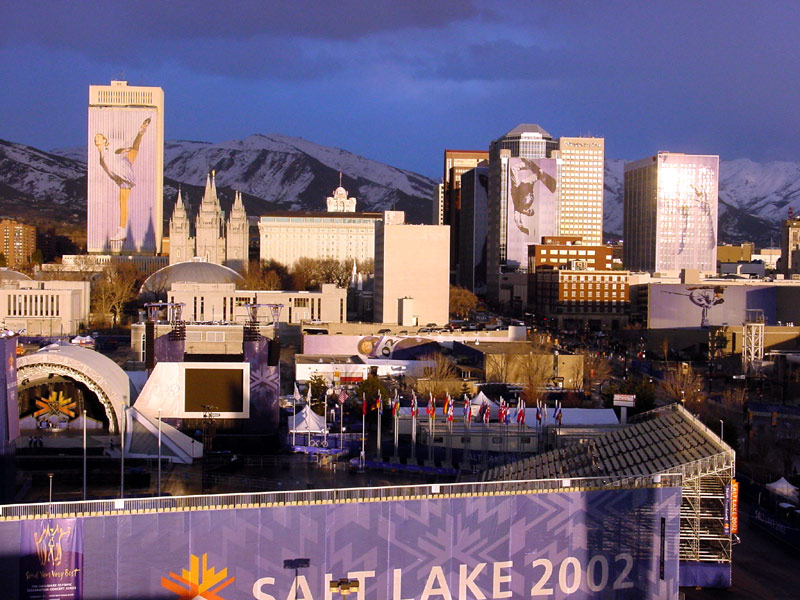
Salt Lake City during the 2002 Winter Olympics

Work on venues for the 2002 Winter Olympics began as early as 1989, following the passing of a state referendum that authorized the use of taxpayer money to publicly fund the construction of new facilities for a Winter Olympics bid in 1998 or 2002. Their construction was overseen by the Salt Lake Olympic Bid Committee and the Utah Sports Authority—a body created under the referendum.

New facilities built for the Games included the Utah Olympic Oval in Kearns, Utah Olympic Park in Summit County, The Ice Sheet at Ogden, and Soldier Hollow at the Wasatch Mountain State Park—the furthest competition venue from Salt Lake City. The E Center in West Valley City and the Peaks Ice Arena in Provo were also built with support from the SLOC, and co-hosted hockey.

Delta Center hosted figure skating and short track speed skating; it was renamed Salt Lake Ice Center for the duration of the Games due to IOC sponsorship rules. Rice-Eccles Stadium at the University of Utah hosted the opening and closing ceremonies. The Olympic Village was built at historic Fort Douglas, whose land had been acquired by the University of Utah to construct new residences. The SLOC provided funding to the project in exchange for its use during the Olympics.

Main Street in Park City was converted into a pedestrian plaza during the Games, with festivities such as concerts, firework shows, and sponsor presences. Medal presentations took place in downtown Salt Lake City; the stage for the ceremony featured the Hoberman Arch, an arch-shaped metal "curtain" designed by Chuck Hoberman.

Venue	Events	Gross capacity	Ref.
Deer Valley	Alpine skiing (slalom), freestyle skiing	13,400	
E Center	Ice hockey	10,500	
Park City Mountain Resort	Alpine skiing (giant slalom), snowboarding	16,000	
Peaks Ice Arena	Ice hockey	8,400	
Salt Lake Ice Center	Figure skating, short track speed skating	17,500	
Snowbasin	Alpine skiing (combined, downhill, super-G)	22,500	
Soldier Hollow	Biathlon, cross-country skiing, Nordic combined (cross-country skiing portion)	15,200	
The Ice Sheet at Ogden	Curling	2,000	
Utah Olympic Oval	Speed skating	5,236	
Utah Olympic Park (bobsleigh, luge, and skeleton track)	Bobsleigh, luge, skeleton, Nordic combined (ski jumping portion), ski jumping	18,100 (ski jumping); 15,000 (sliding track)	

=== 2002 Cultural Olympiad ===
"Call of the Champions"
composed by John Williams for the 2002 Winter Olympics in Salt Lake City. Performed by the Mormon Tabernacle Choir and the Utah Symphony Orchestra. The choir sings the Olympic motto "Citius, Altius, Fortius" which is Latin for "Faster, Higher, Stronger."

The 2002 Cultural Olympiad, which ran from January to March 2002, was an arts festival that accompanied the 2002 Winter Olympics. It included specially commissioned works, such as Alvin Ailey American Dance Theater's work Here...Now inspired by the life of Olympian Florence Griffith Joyner, accompanied by music by Wynton Marsalis. An art exhibition was held at Springville Museum of Art that celebrated 150 years of Utah's art history. The programme also featured many other performances, including dance, theatre, singing, and literature, as well as the glass art of Dale Chihuly.

=== Olympic Music ===
Call of the Champions is a cantata-fanfare for orchestra and choir composed by John Williams for the 2002 Winter Olympics. Premiering at the Opening Ceremony on February 8, 2002, it began with the call by the Tabernacle Choir at Temple Square of "Citius! Altius! Fortius!" (Faster, Higher, Stronger), which is the Olympic Motto chosen by the founder of the modern Games, Baron Pierre de Coubertin. Williams added another Latin word as well: "Clarius," meaning "clearer."

=== Torch relay ===
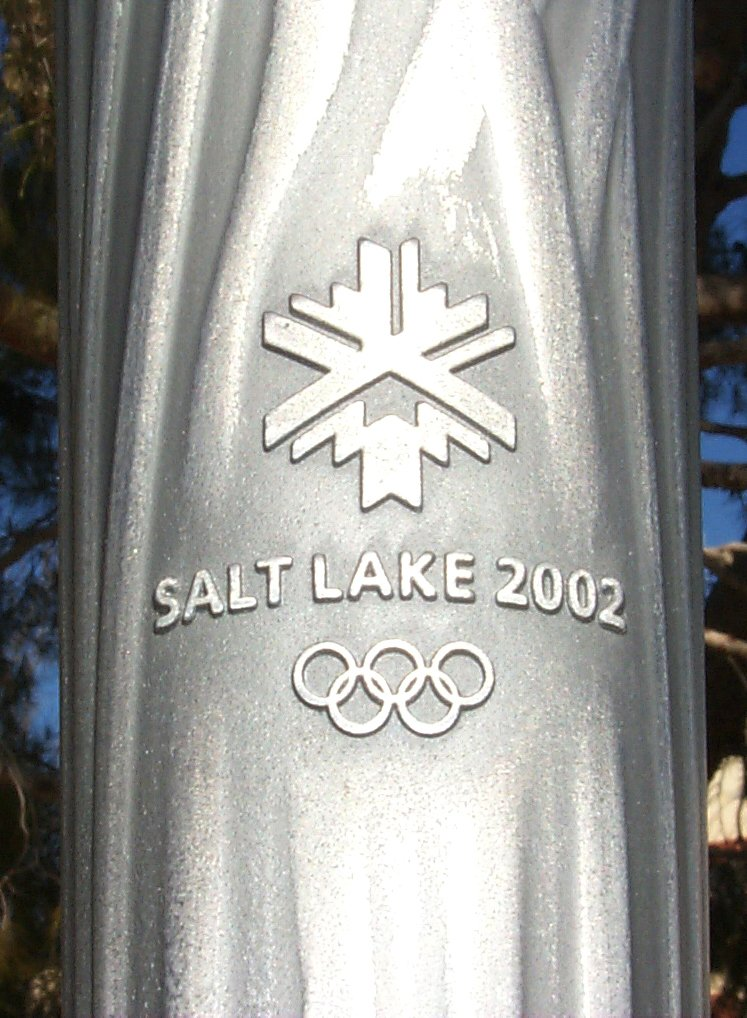
Detail of the 2002 Winter Olympic Torch

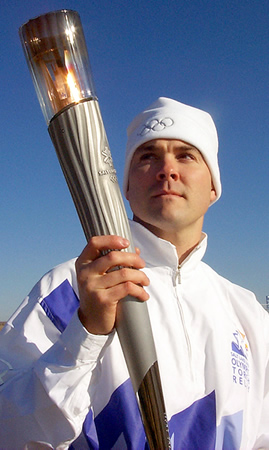
Torchbearer in Olympic livery

The torch relay ceremonially began on November 19, 2001, with the traditional kindling of an Olympic flame in Olympia, Greece. On December 3, Greek skier Thanassis Tsailas lit the first torch from the cauldron, and transferred its flame to a ceremonial lantern for transport to Atlanta, where it arrived on December 4 to officially launch the U.S. leg of the relay. The route of the relay covered 13,500 miles (21,700 km), passed through 300 communities and 46 U.S. states, and was carried by 12,012 torchbearers.

The torch was modeled after an icicle, with a slight curve to represent speed and fluidity. The torch measures 33 inches (84 cm) long, 3 inches (7.6 cm) wide at the top, 0.5 inches (1.3 cm) at the bottom, and was designed by Axiom Design of Salt Lake City. It was created with three sections, each with its own meaning and representation.

== Marketing ==
=== Branding & Emblem ===
The overall branding of the 2002 Winter Olympics, the "Look of the Games" design was named "Land of Contrast — Fire and Ice", which featured a palette of warm and cool colors to contrast the warmer, rugged, red-rock areas of Southern Utah from the colder, mountainous regions of Northern Utah. The three main color palettes were: Amber Gold, Sunset Orange and Mountain Shadow Blue: With accented hue variations of the palette.

- sandstone
- amber
- wildfire
- redrock
- azure lapis
- decorative blue
- dark turquoise
- lake

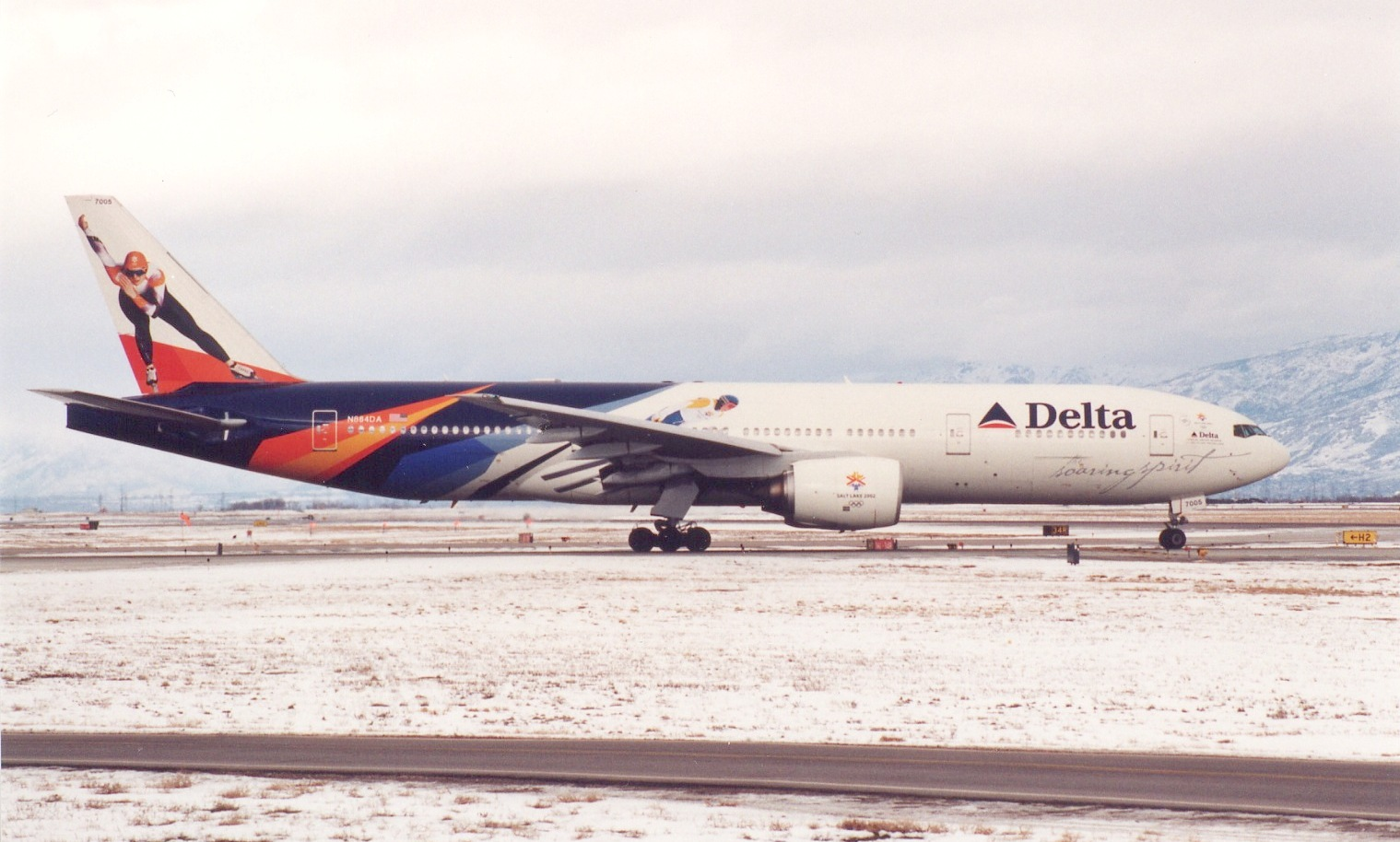
Delta's Boeing 777-200ER (N864DA) in livery commemorating the Games

The emblem was named "Crystal Rhythm". It featured a six pointed snow crystal, again with the three main colors representing Utahs southern deserts and its high snowy mountain ranges. Designed to resemble an Olympic cauldron, a flame, as well as a sun rising from behind mountains. The orange center section of the flame was intended to reflect traditional Navajo weaving. The emblem logo was designed by Landor Associates and unveiled in August 1997.

The official event pictograms were inspired by branding irons, and the line thickness and 30-degree angles mirrored those of the emblem.

=== Mascots ===
Powder, Copper and Coal, the 2002 Olympic mascots

The designs of the mascots of the 2002 Winter Olympics were unveiled on May 19, 1999, during an event marking 1,000 days until the opening ceremony. The mascots represent three animals native to the western United States — a snowshoe hare, coyote, and American black bear respectively, with each mascot symbolizing a character from the legends of local Native Americans, and wearing a charm around their neck with an original Anasazi or Fremont-style petroglyph. For the first time in Olympic history, the names of the mascots were determined by a public vote, using name suggestions submitted by local students; on September 25, the names of the mascots were officially announced as Powder, Copper, and Coal respectively.

== Participating National Olympic Committees ==
A total of 78 teams qualified at least one athlete to compete in the Games. Five NOCs made their Winter Olympic debut in Salt Lake, including Cameroon, Hong Kong, Nepal, Tajikistan, and Thailand. Costa Rica and Lebanon returned to the Winter games after a 10-year absence, and Fiji, Mexico and San Marino returned after 8 years. Four countries, Luxembourg, North Korea, Portugal and Uruguay which were at the 1998 Games, did not participate in 2002.

Participating nations

Participating National Olympic Committees
- Andorra (3)
- Argentina (11)
- Armenia (9)
- Australia (27)
- Austria (90)
- Azerbaijan (4)
- Belarus (64)
- Belgium (6)
- Bermuda (1)
- Bosnia and Herzegovina (2)
- Brazil (10)
- Bulgaria (23)
- Cameroon (1)
- Canada (150)
- Chile (6)
- China (66)
- Chinese Taipei (6)
- Costa Rica (1)
- Croatia (14)
- Cyprus (1)
- Czech Republic (76)
- Denmark (11)
- Estonia (17)
- Fiji (1)
- Finland (98)
- France (114)
- Georgia (4)
- Germany (157)
- Great Britain (49)
- Greece (10)
- Hong Kong (2)
- Hungary (25)
- Iceland (6)
- India (1)
- Iran (2)
- Ireland (6)
- Israel (5)
- Italy (112)
- Jamaica (2)
- Japan (103)
- Kazakhstan (50)
- Kenya (1)
- Kyrgyzstan (2)
- Latvia (47)
- Lebanon (2)
- Liechtenstein (8)
- Lithuania (8)
- Macedonia (2)
- Mexico (3)
- Moldova (5)
- Monaco (5)
- Mongolia (4)
- Nepal (1)
- Netherlands (27)
- New Zealand (10)
- Norway (77)
- Poland (27)
- Puerto Rico (2)
- Romania (21)
- Russia (151)
- San Marino (1)
- Slovakia (49)
- Slovenia (40)
- South Africa (1)
- South Korea (48)
- Spain (7)
- Sweden (102)
- Switzerland (110)
- Tajikistan (1)
- Thailand (1)
- Trinidad and Tobago (3)
- Turkey (3)
- Ukraine (68)
- United States (202) (host)
- Uzbekistan (6)
- Venezuela (4)
- Virgin Islands (8)
- FR Yugoslavia (6)

=== Number of athletes by National Olympic Committee ===
2,399 athletes from 78 NOCs

IOC Letter Code	Country	Athletes
USA	United States	202
GER	Germany	157
RUS	Russia	151
CAN	Canada	150
FRA	France	114
ITA	Italy	112
SUI	Switzerland	110
JPN	Japan	103
SWE	Sweden	102
FIN	Finland	98
AUT	Austria	90
NOR	Norway	77
CZE	Czech Republic	76
UKR	Ukraine	68
CHN	China	66
BLR	Belarus	64
KAZ	Kazakhstan	50
GBR	Great Britain	49
SVK	Slovakia	49
KOR	South Korea	48
LAT	Latvia	47
SLO	Slovenia	40
AUS	Australia	27
NED	Netherlands	27
POL	Poland	27
HUN	Hungary	25
BUL	Bulgaria	23
ROU	Romania	21
EST	Estonia	17
CRO	Croatia	14
ARG	Argentina	11
DEN	Denmark	11
BRA	Brazil	10
GRE	Greece	10
NZL	New Zealand	10
ARM	Armenia	9
LIE	Liechtenstein	8
LTU	Lithuania	8
ISV	Virgin Islands	8
ESP	Spain	7
BEL	Belgium	6
CHI	Chile	6
ISL	Iceland	6
IRL	Ireland	6
TPE	Chinese Taipei	6
UZB	Uzbekistan	6
YUG	FR Yugoslavia	6
ISR	Israel	5
MDA	Moldova	5
MON	Monaco	5
AZE	Azerbaijan	4
GEO	Georgia	4
MGL	Mongolia	4
VEN	Venezuela	4
AND	Andorra	3
MEX	Mexico	3
TUR	Turkey	3
BIH	Bosnia and Herzegovina	2
HKG	Hong Kong	2
IRI	Iran	2
JAM	Jamaica	2
KGZ	Kyrgyzstan	2
LIB	Lebanon	2
MKD	Macedonia	2
PUR	Puerto Rico	2
TRI	Trinidad and Tobago	2
BER	Bermuda	1
CMR	Cameroon	1
CRC	Costa Rica	1
CYP	Cyprus	1
FIJ	Fiji	1
IND	India	1
KEN	Kenya	1
NEP	Nepal	1
SMR	San Marino	1
RSA	South Africa	1
TJK	Tajikistan	1
THA	Thailand	1

== Calendar ==
In the following calendar for the 2002 Winter Olympic Games, each blue box represents an event competition, such as a qualification round, on that day. The yellow boxes represent days during which medal-awarding finals for a sport are held. The number in each box represents the number of finals that were contested on that day.

All dates are in Mountain Standard Time (UTC−7)

OC	Opening ceremony	●	Event competitions	1	Event finals	EG	Exhibition gala	CC	Closing ceremony

February	8th Fri	9th Sat	10th Sun	11th Mon	12th Tue	13th Wed	14th Thu	15th Fri	16th Sat	17th Sun	18th Mon	19th Tue	20th Wed	21st Thu	22nd Fri	23rd Sat	24th Sun	Events
Ceremonies	OC																CC	
Alpine skiing			1		1	1	1		1	1			1	1	1	1		10
Biathlon				2		2			2		1		1					8
Bobsleigh									●	1		1			●	1		3
Cross country skiing		2			2		1	1		1		2		1		1	1	12
Curling				●	●	●	●	●	●	●	●	●	●	1	1			2
Figure skating		●		1	●		1	●		●	1	●		1	EG			4
Freestyle skiing		1			1						1	1						4
Ice hockey		●	●	●	●	●	●	●	●	●	●	●	●	1	●	●	1	2
Luge			●	1	●	1		1										3
Nordic combined		●	1						●	1				●	1			3
Short track speed skating						1			2				2			3		8
Skeleton													2					2
Ski jumping	●		1		●	1					1							3
Snowboarding			1	1			●	2										4
Speed skating		1	1	●	1	●	1		1	1		1	1		1	1		10
Total events		4	5	5	5	6	4	4	6	5	4	5	7	5	4	7	2	78
Cumulative total		4	9	14	19	25	29	33	39	44	48	53	60	65	69	76	78	
February	8th Fri	9th Sat	10th Sun	11th Mon	12th Tue	13th Wed	14th Thu	15th Fri	16th Sat	17th Sun	18th Mon	19th Tue	20th Wed	21st Thu	22nd Fri	23rd Sat	24th Sun	Events

== The Games ==
=== Opening ceremony ===
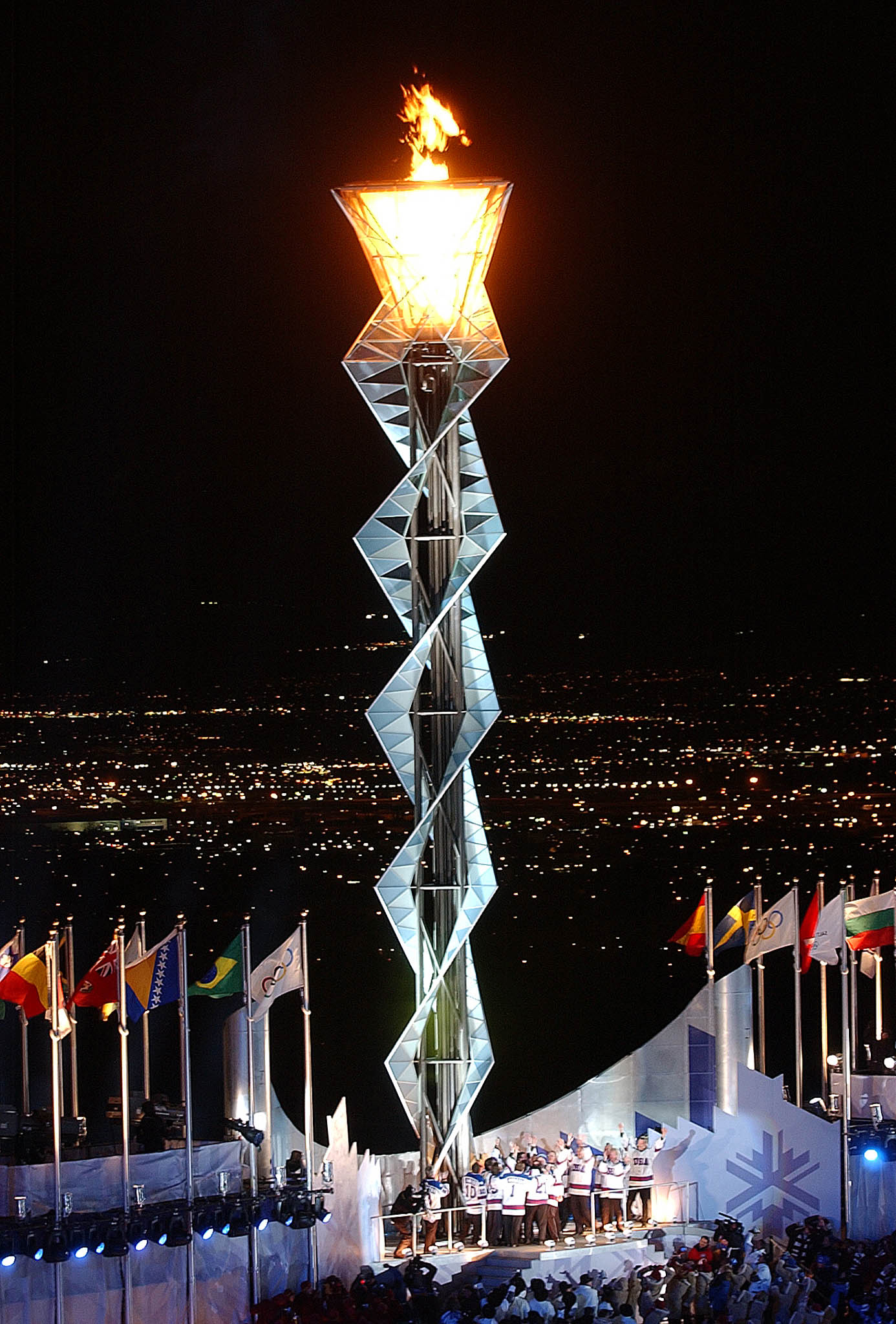
The Olympic cauldron being lit by the 1980 U.S. men's hockey team.

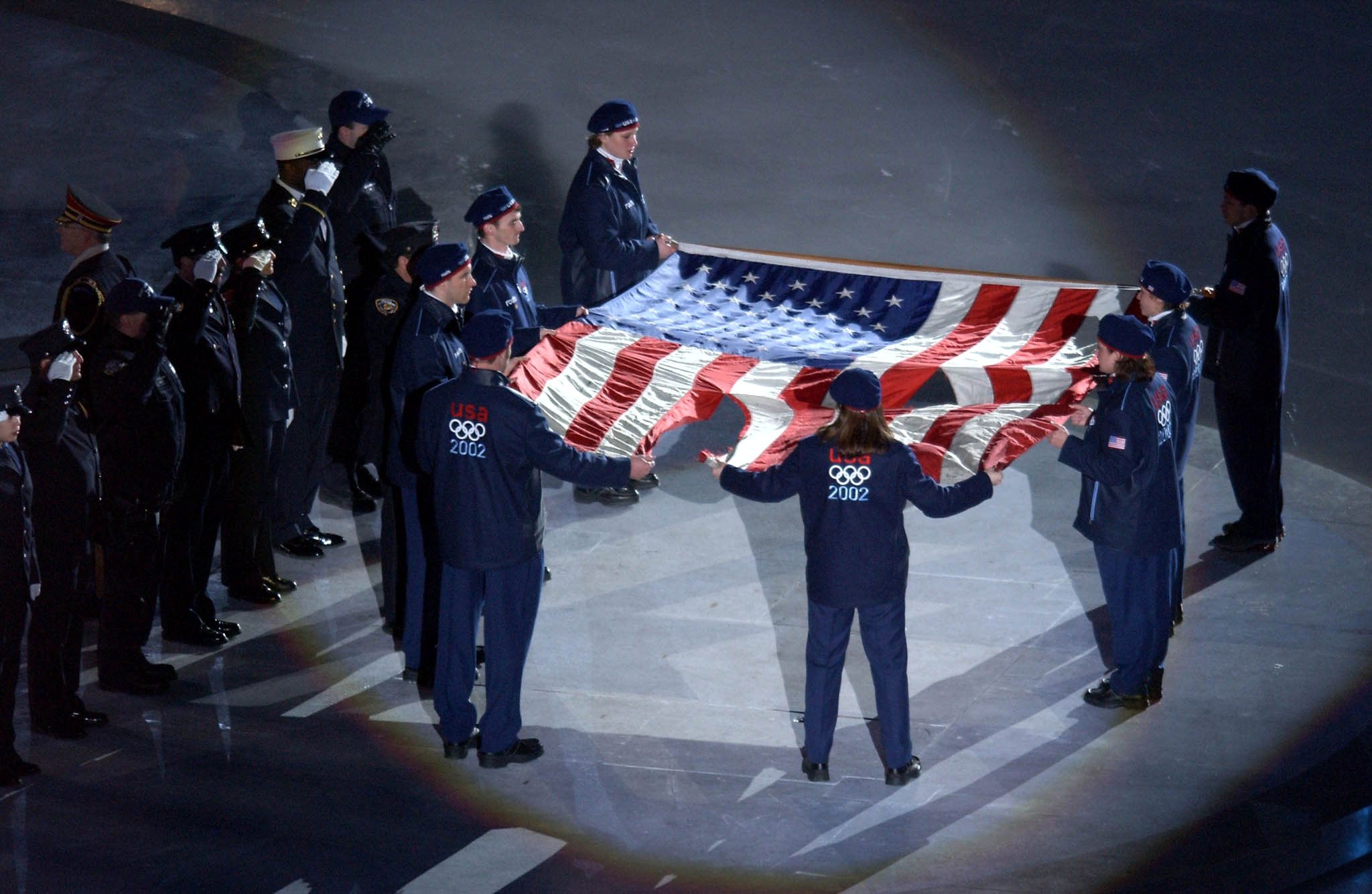
Members of the US Olympic team at the Rice–Eccles Olympic Stadium holding the American flag that flew over the World Trade Center on September 11, 2001

The opening ceremony of the 2002 Winter Olympics was held at Rice–Eccles Stadium at the University of Utah on February 8, 2002. The facility was renovated and expanded for the Games. The Games were officially opened by President George W. Bush, who was standing among the US athletes (previous heads of state opened the Games from an official box), while the Olympic cauldron was lit by members of the gold medal-winning U.S. men's ice hockey team from the 1980 Winter Olympics in Lake Placid, New York (as made famous by the "Miracle on Ice").

In an acknowledgment of the September 11 attacks, the ceremony opened with the entrance of a damaged American flag recovered from the wreckage of the World Trade Center, carried by an honor guard of police officers from the Port Authority of New York and New Jersey, the New York City Police Department, and firefighters from the New York City Fire Department, joined by athletes nominated by fellow members of the U.S. team. The flag was presented during the playing of the U.S. national anthem "The Star-Spangled Banner", as performed by the Tabernacle Choir.

Jacques Rogge, presiding over his first Olympics as the IOC president, told the athletes of the United States:

Your nation is overcoming a horrific tragedy, a tragedy that has affected the whole world. We stand united with you in the promotion of our common ideals and hope for world peace.

The Olympic cauldron was designed to look like an icicle and was made of glass, allowing the fire to be seen burning within, reflecting the Games' slogan "Light the Fire Within" and an overarching "fire and ice" theme. The actual glass cauldron stands atop a twisting glass and steel support, is 12 feet (3.7 m) high, and the flame within burns at 900 °F (482 °C). Together with its support, the cauldron stands 117 feet (36 m) tall and was made of 738 individual pieces of glass. Small jets send water down the glass sides of the cauldron to keep the glass and metal cooled (so they would not crack or melt) and give the effect of melting ice. The cauldron was designed by WET Design of Los Angeles, its frame built by roller coaster manufacturer Arrow Dynamics of Clearfield, Utah, and its glass pieces created by Western Glass of Ogden, Utah. The cauldron's cost was $2 million, and it was unveiled to the public when originally installed at Rice–Eccles Stadium on January 8, 2002.

Production for the opening and closing ceremonies was designed by Seven Nielsen, and music for both ceremonies was directed by Mark Watters.

=== Closing ceremonies ===
The closing ceremony of the 2002 Winter Olympics was held on February 24, 2002, at Rice–Eccles Stadium. It was narrated by Utah natives Donny and Marie Osmond (who voiced animatronic dinosaur skeletons designed by Michael Curry), and featured performances by a number of musicians and bands, including Bon Jovi, Christina Aguilera, Creed, Dianne Reeves, Donny and Marie Osmond, Earth, Wind & Fire, Gloria Estefan, Harry Connick Jr., Kiss, Moby and Angie Stone, NSYNC, R. Kelly, Sting, Willie Nelson, and Yo Yo Ma. It also featured appearances by figure skaters such as Kurt Browning, Dorothy Hamill, and Ilia Kulick, as well as dancer Savion Glover.

Departing from Juan Antonio Samaranch's tradition of declaring each Olympics the "best ever", IOC president Jacques Rogge began a tradition of assigning each Games their own identity in his comments, describing the 2002 Winter Olympics as having been "flawless".

Italian singers Irene Grandi and Elisa performed during the cultural presentation by Turin, host city of the 2006 Winter Olympics, while Josh Groban and Charlotte Church performed a duet of "The Prayer" as the Olympic cauldron was extinguished.

=== Sports ===
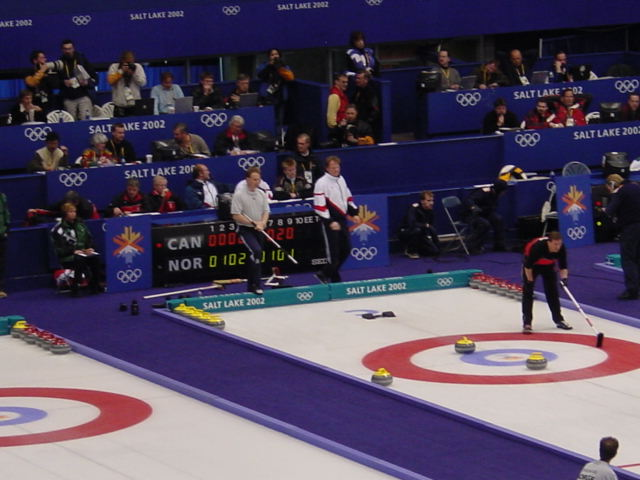
Curling at The Ice Sheet at Ogden on February 22, 2002

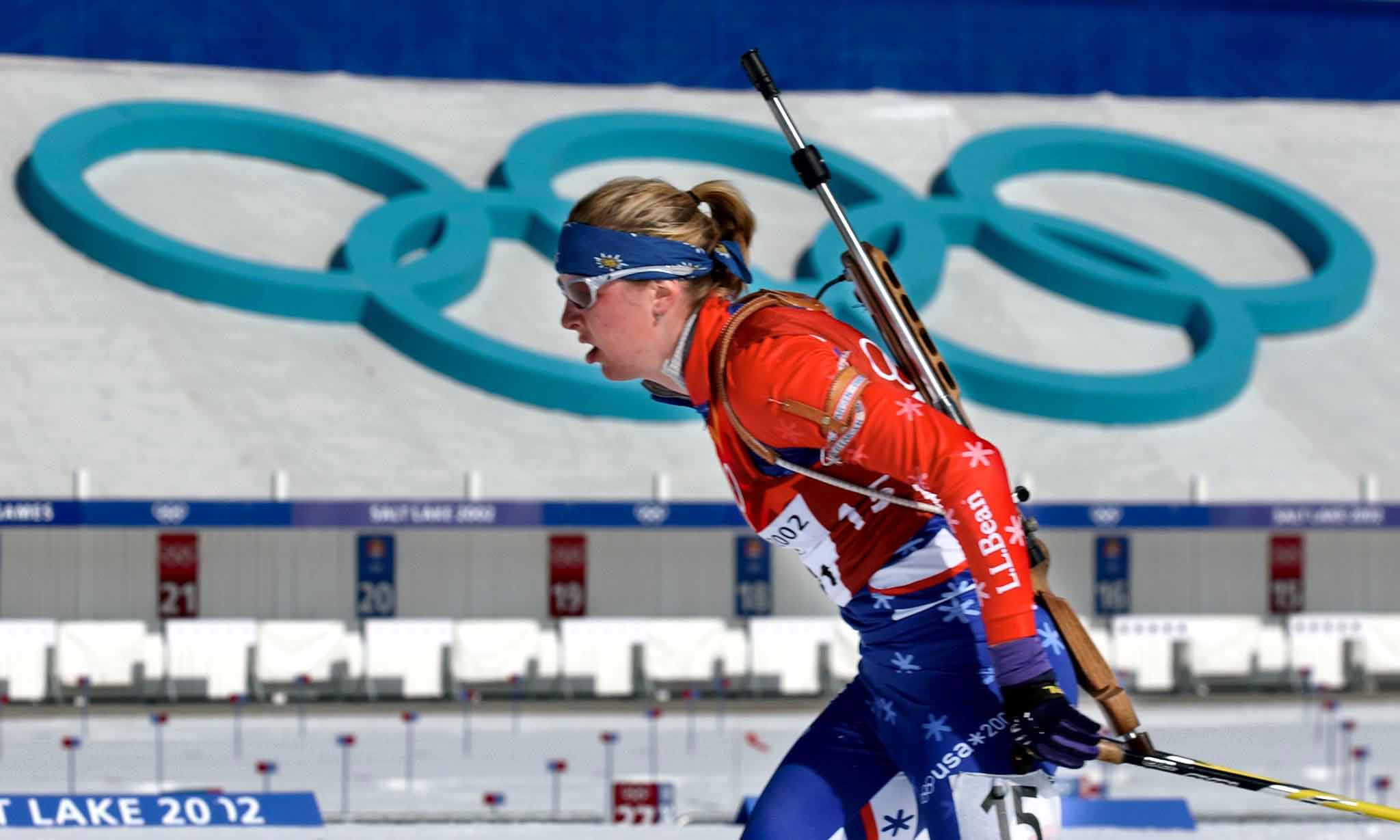
Andrea Nahrgang competing at Soldier Hollow on February 18, 2002

Confirmed in 1997, this edition's sports program featured seven sports divided into 15 disciplines, totaling 78 events, an increase of 10 events over the 1998 Winter Olympics. Skeleton made its return to the Winter Olympic program for the first time since 1948, while a women's doubles event was contested for the first time in bobsleigh. A fourth distance was introduced in short track speed skating for men and women, and the pursuit events were added to biathlon and cross-country skiing. The sprint event was also added to the Nordic combined program.

1. Biathlon
  - Biathlon (8)
2. Bobsleigh
  - Bobsleigh (3)
  - Skeleton (2)
3. Curling
  - Curling (2)
4. Ice hockey
  - Ice hockey (2)
5. Luge
  - Luge (3)
6. Skating
  - Figure skating (4)
  - Short track speed skating (8)
  - Speed skating (10)
7. Skiing
  - Alpine skiing (10)
  - Cross-country skiing (12)
  - Freestyle skiing (4)
  - Nordic combined (3)
  - Ski jumping (3)
  - Snowboarding (4)

Numbers in parentheses indicate the number of medal events contested in each separate discipline.

=== Athletic Achievements ===
Several medal records were set or tied, including:

- Norway tied the Soviet Union at the 1976 Winter Olympics for most gold medals at a Winter Olympics, with 13.
- Germany set a record for most total medals at a Winter Olympics, with 36.
- The United States set a record for most gold medals at a home Winter Olympics, with 10, tying Norway at the 1994 Winter Olympics.

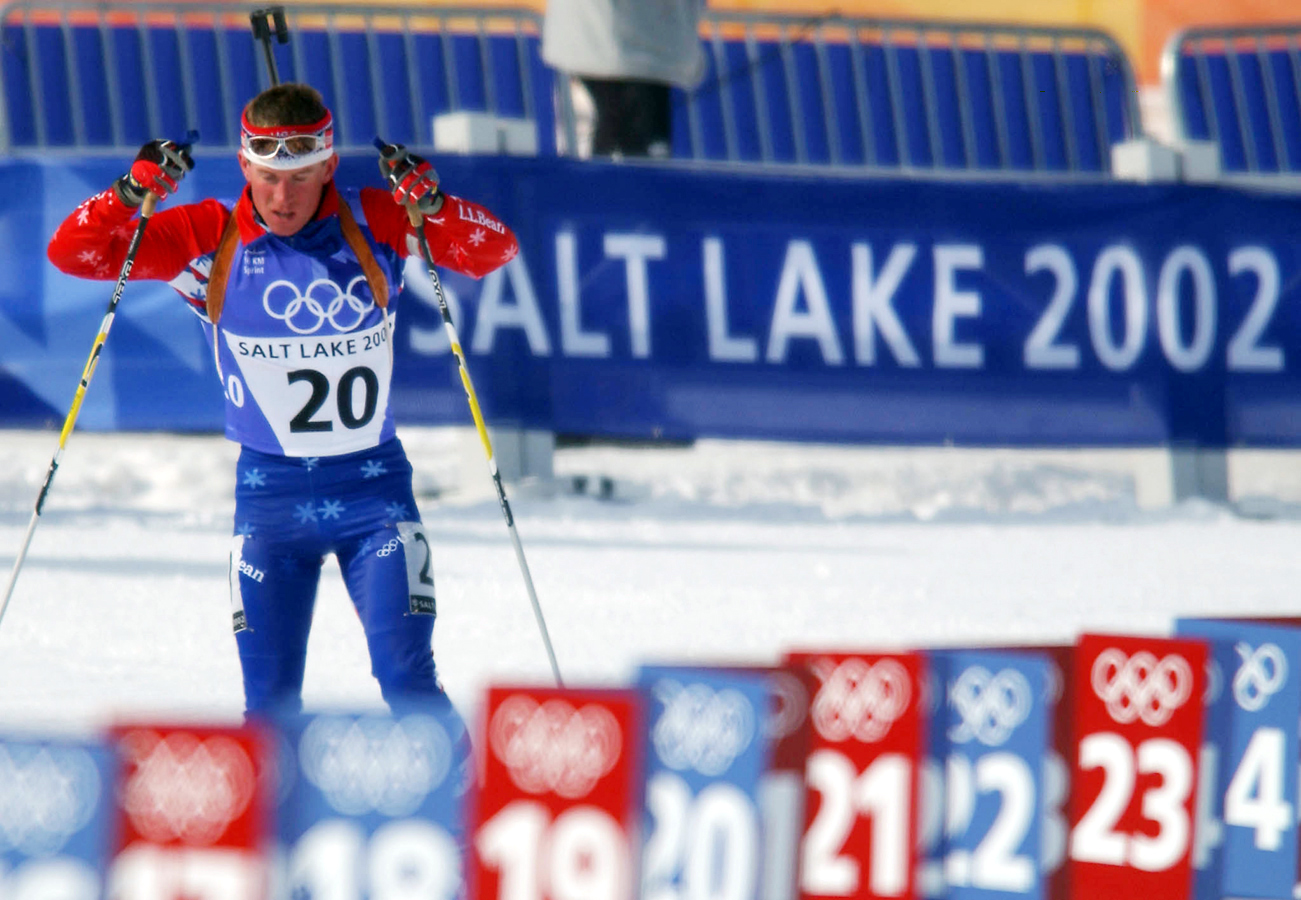
The men's 10km sprint biathlon race at Soldier Hollow during the Games on February 13, 2002

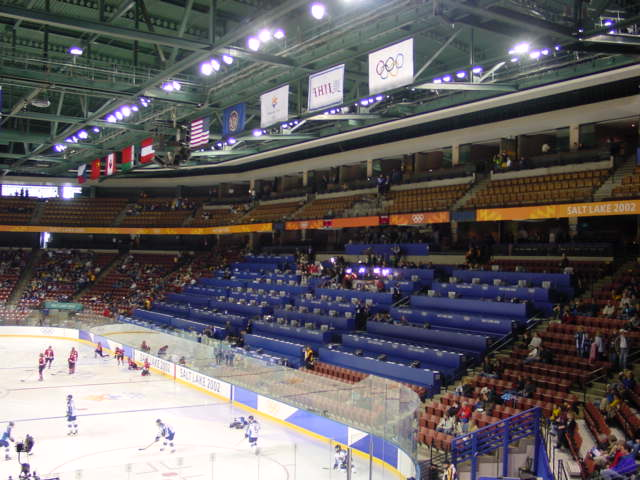
The E Center during a hockey match on February 11, 2002

- Vonetta Flowers became the first Black athlete of any nationality to win a gold medal in a Winter Olympics when she as brakewoman and Jill Bakken as driver won the 2-person bobsled event.
- Competition highlights included biathlete Ole Einar Bjørndalen of Norway, winning gold in all four men's events (10 km, 12.5 km, 20 km, 4 x 7.5 km relay), Nordic combined athlete Samppa Lajunen of Finland winning three gold medals, Simon Ammann of Switzerland taking the double in ski jumping. In alpine skiing, Janica Kostelić won three golds and a silver (the first Winter Olympic medals ever for an athlete from Croatia), while Kjetil André Aamodt of Norway earned his second and third career golds, setting up both athletes to beat the sport's record with their fourth golds earned at the next Winter Olympics near Turin (Aamodt also set the overall medal record in the sport with eight).
- Team GB's victory in Women's Curling saw them win their first gold medal in any Winter Olympic sport since Torvill and Dean in 1984.
- Ireland reached its best-ever position and came close to winning its first winter medal when Clifton Wrottesley (Clifton Hugh Lancelot de Verdon Wrottesley, 6th Baron Wrottesley) finished fourth in the men's skeleton event.
- A feature of these Games was the emergence of extreme sports, such as snowboarding, moguls, and aerials, some of which appeared in previous Olympic Winter Games but subsequently captured greater public attention.
- The United States completed a sweep of the podium in halfpipe snowboarding, with Americans Ross Powers, Danny Kass, and Jarret Thomas all winning medals.
- American Sarah Hughes won the gold medal in ladies' singles figure skating. Her team-mate Michelle Kwan fell during her long program and received the bronze medal.
- China won its first and second Winter Olympic gold medals, both by women's short-track speed skater Yang Yang (A).
- In the men's 1000m competition in short-track speed skating, Australian Steven Bradbury (who had won a bronze in 1994 as part of a relay team) became both the first-ever Australian, and the first-ever athlete from a country in the Southern Hemisphere, to win a gold medal at the Winter Olympics. Despite being off their pace, Bradbury benefitted from crashes involving his opponents in both the semi-finals and finals, with the latter occurring coming out of the final turn. A few days later in women's aerials, Australian skier Alisa Camplin won Australia's second gold medal. After the Games, the phrase "doing a Bradbury" would become a local idiom for an unexpected victory in a sporting event at the expense of one's opponents, and was added to the second edition of The Australian National Dictionary in 2016.
- Belarus's Vladimir Kopat scored a game winning goal from center ice against Sweden in the men's ice hockey quarterfinals, getting Belarus to their best place in international hockey so far.
- The Canadian men's ice hockey team defeated the United States team 5–2 to claim the gold medal, ending a 50-year drought without hockey gold. The Canadian women's team also defeated the American team 3–2 after losing to them in Nagano. In a post-game press conference after the men's gold medal game, Team Canada's executive director Wayne Gretzky revealed that a Canadian $1 coin (colloquially known as a "Loonie") had been secretly placed at center ice by one of the ice technicians. The "lucky Loonie" subsequently became a notable symbol of Canada's victory in the tournament.

=== Medal table ===
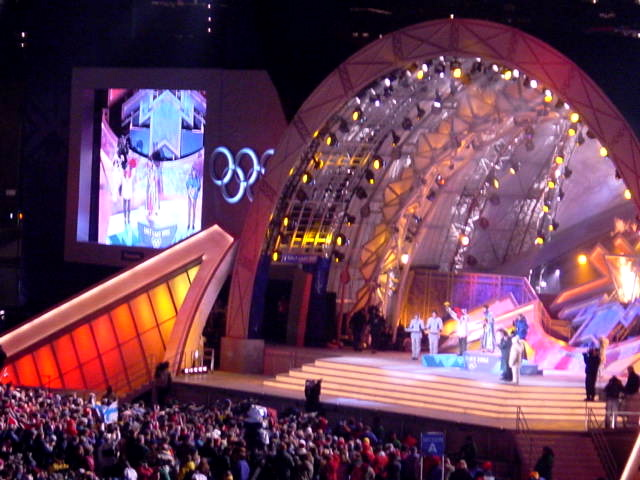
Ski jumping medals being awarded at the Salt Lake Medal Plaza on February 13, 2002

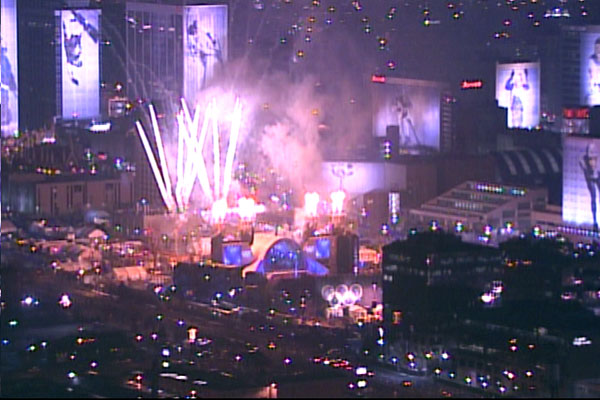
Fireworks at the Salt Lake Medal Plaza

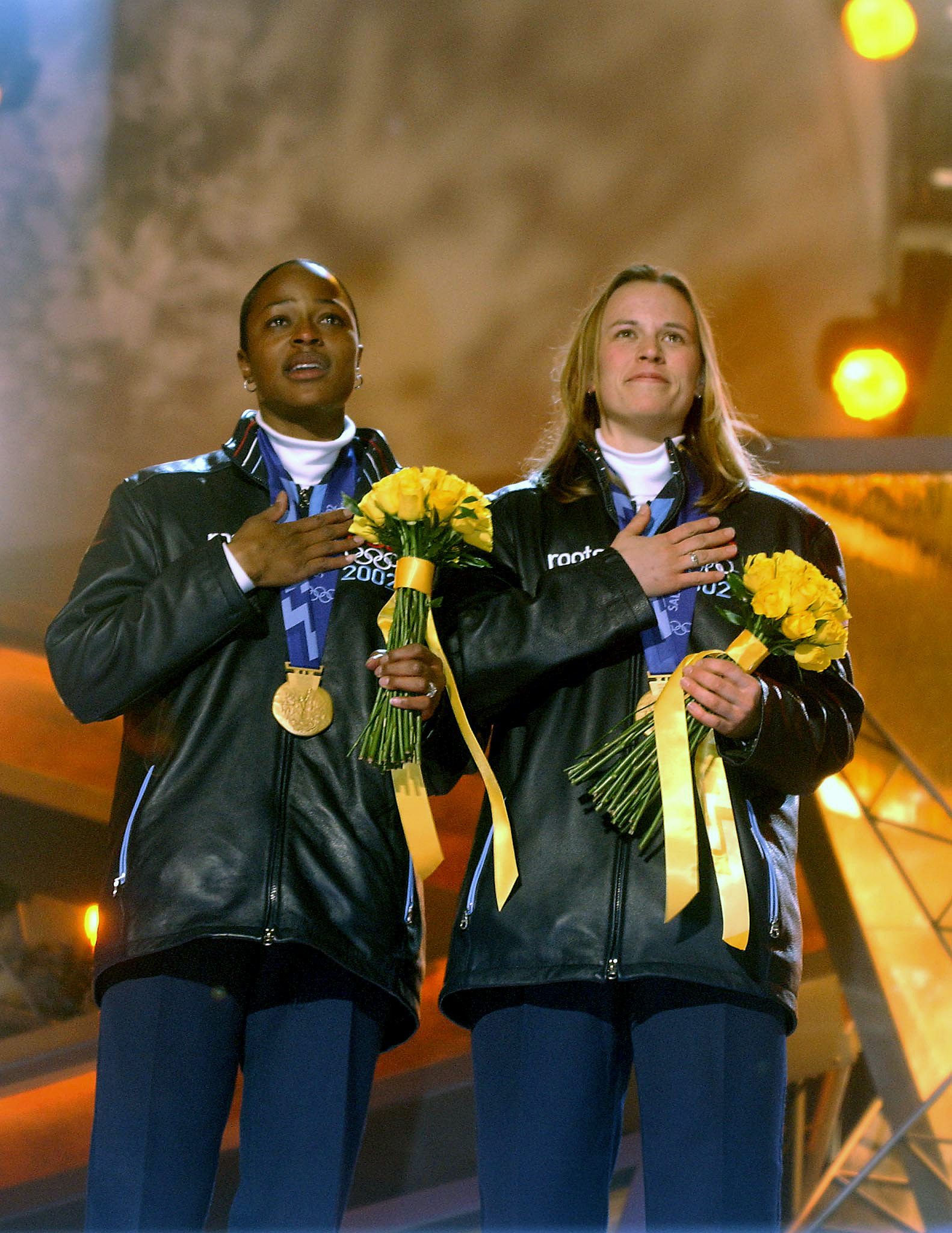
Vonetta Flowers and Jill Bakken during their medal ceremony at the Salt Lake Medal Plaza, after winning gold for the United States in the two-woman bobsleigh

At the 2002 Winter Games in Salt Lake City, the "medal plaza" was popularized as a way for the public to see presentations that would have otherwise taken place at far-flung, low-capacity or high-altitude venues and to have an evening program that often included musical performances.

2002 Winter Olympics medal table
Rank	Nation	Gold	Silver	Bronze	Total
1	Norway	13	5	7	25
2	Germany	12	16	8	36
3	United States*	10	13	11	34
4	Canada	7	3	7	17
5	Russia	5	4	4	13
6	France	4	5	2	11
7	Italy	4	4	5	13
8	Finland	4	2	1	7
9	Netherlands	3	5	0	8
10	Austria	3	4	10	17
11–24	remaining	15	15	23	53
Totals (24 entries)		80	76	78	234

=== Podium sweeps ===
Date	Sport	Event	NOC	Gold	Silver	Bronze
February 11	Snowboarding	Men's halfpipe	United States	Ross Powers	Danny Kass	Jarret Thomas
February 13	Luge	Women's singles	Germany	Sylke Otto	Barbara Niedernhuber	Silke Kraushaar

== Broadcasting rights ==
International Sports Broadcasting (ISB) served as the host broadcaster for the 2002 Winter Olympics; the Salt Palace convention center served as the International Broadcast Centre and press center for the Games. The IOC estimated that the 2002 Winter Olympics were viewed by over two billion people worldwide, with 13 billion viewer-hours watched.

In the United States, the 2002 Winter Olympics were broadcast by NBC Universal networks. They were the first Winter Olympics under a multi-year rights agreement between NBC and the IOC, under which it would hold exclusive rights to all Olympic Games from 1996 through 2008. The contract had excluded the 1998 Winter Olympics, as CBS Sports had an existing deal to exclusively televise the Winter Olympics from 1992 through 1998.

NBC partnered with HDNet to produce an eight-hour block of daily coverage in high definition, which was carried by HDNet and on the digital signals of participating NBC affiliates. Despite being held in a time zone only one hour ahead of Pacific Time, NBC still tape delayed much of its coverage for the west coast, although Salt Lake City's local NBC affiliate KSL-TV was given permission to air the live, east coast broadcasts to ensure their availability in the Games' host city.

Coverage of the Games by the Seven Network in Australia featured The Ice Dream, a miniseries presented by comedy duo Roy and HG as a follow-up to The Dream—their series for the 2000 Summer Olympics. The series featured a running gag of the duo proposing an Australian bid to hold the 2010 Winter Olympics in the resort town of Smiggin Holes, New South Wales.

== Legacy ==
=== Ski industry and winter sport ===
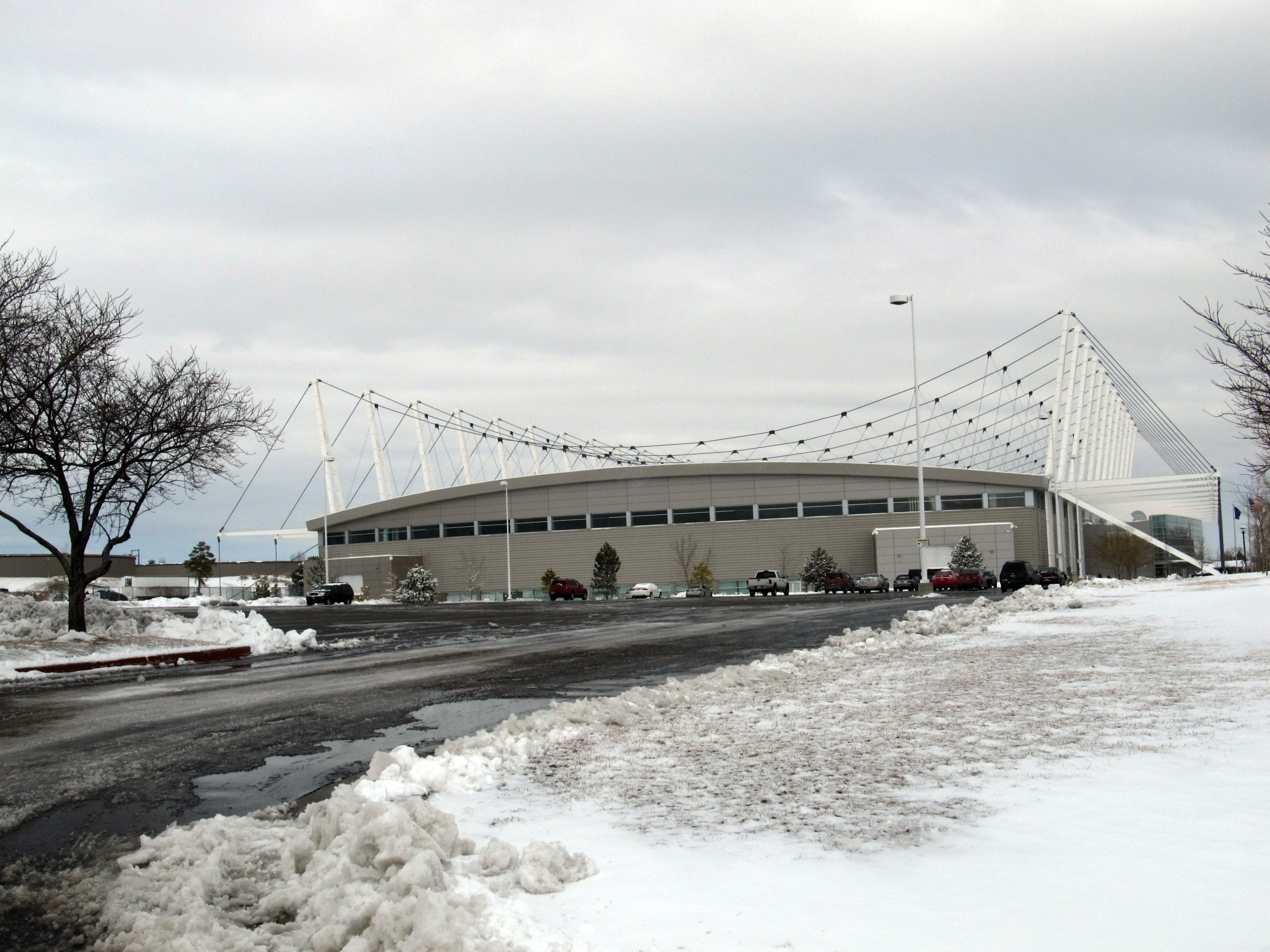
Utah Olympic Oval

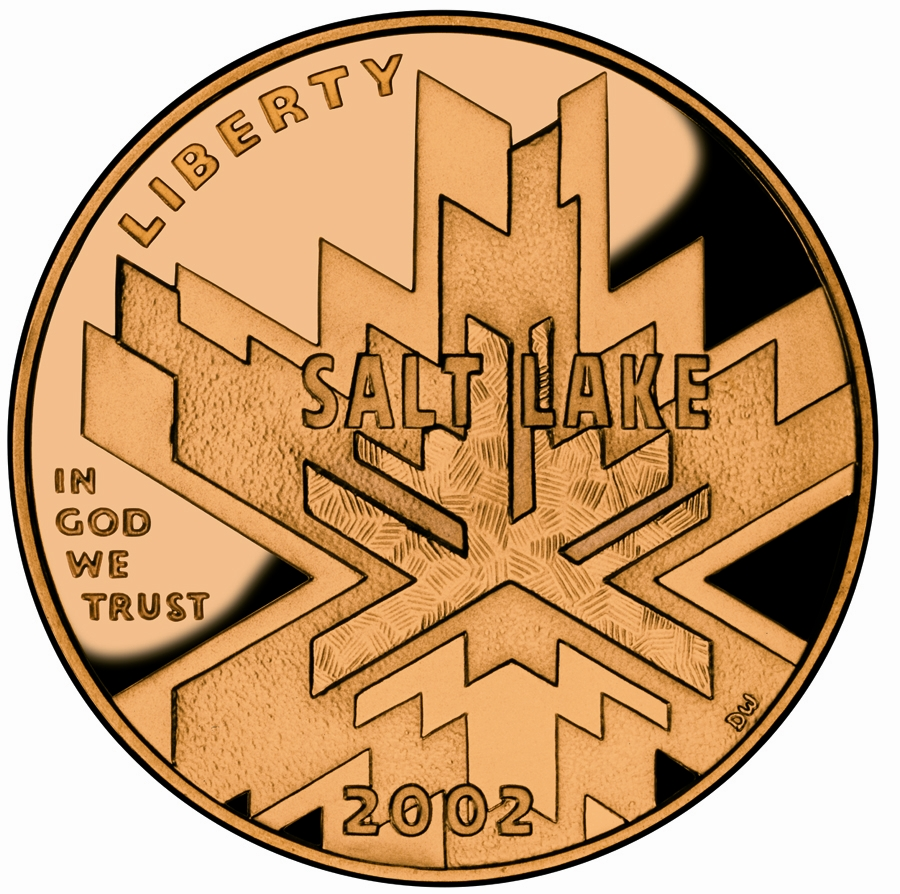
2002 Olympic Winter Games $5 coin created by the U.S. Mint

The 2002 Winter Olympics brought a huge amount of success to the Utah skiing industry. Since hosting the Winter Games, Utah has seen a 42% increase in skier and snowboarder visits as of 2010–11. This increase resulted in direct expenditures from skiers and snowboarders growing 67% from $704 million in 2002–2003 to $1.2 billion in 2010–2011.

Fourteen venues were constructed or expanded in preparation for the Winter Games. One of the venues constructed for the Games was the Utah Olympic Park, which has proven to be one of the most successful venues to date because it has been maintained in top competition form. Owing to the routine maintenance of the park, Utah has been able to host a large number of winter competitions since 2002, including more than 60 World Cup events (e.g. the FIS Freestyle Skiing World Cup), as well as seven world championships, and various other sporting events. Hosting these high-profile competitions has resulted in approximately $1 billion being injected into the local economy. During 2013–2014, Utah held 16 various winter sport events, bringing $27.3 million to the economy of Utah. After holding the Olympics, Utah became home to two National Governing Bodies of Sport. The U.S. Ski and Snowboard Association is headquartered in Park City, Utah and the U.S. Olympic speed skating team is based out of the Utah Olympic Oval.

=== University of Utah expansion ===
The University of Utah was one of the hosts of the 2002 Winter Olympics; the planning committee approached the University of Utah and asked them to build several student dormitories which would serve as athletes' accommodation during the Games. It was agreed that the university would pay approximately $98 million out of the total required amount of $110 million to complete the construction. As a result, students of the university have benefited as almost 3,500 of them would be housed here after the Games. This was a great economic benefit to the university since the amount of money used to complete such dormitories could take long to be afforded. The university was also asked to expand Rice Eccles Stadium to accommodate 50,000 people up from 32,000. The university would then be refunded almost $59 million and be given an extra $40 million for its maintenance.

The 2002 Olympic Games also benefited the university economically since the Salt Lake 2002 Olympic Cauldron Park was elevated by the renovations that took place. Ice rinks were very scarce in Utah, but they became plentiful and offered several entertainment and training opportunities for hockey players and figure skaters due to the Olympic Games. The Cauldron Park located at the University of Utah which was built with $6.5 million in profits and had the following features: a visitors' center which had a theater that showed a thrilling movie about the Olympic Games of 2002 and a "park" which had a dazzling pool and a V-shaped stone wall with the names of all the medalists of the 2002 Olympic Games. Besides, the park had 17 plates that hung on the stadium's fence celebrating the highlights of each day of the Olympics. All these features acted as tourist attraction that boosted the economic development of the university. In addition, it is indicated that the approximate value of media exposure through print during the Games was equated to $22.9 million. Mainly, this was a huge economic benefit to the university as more and more people got to know about the educational establishment, and this also boosted enrollment and future development.

=== Immigration ===
Holger Preuss in his book The Economics of Staging the Olympics: A Comparison of the Games 1972–2008 argues that "The export of the 'Olympic Games' service results in an inflow of funds to the host city, causing additional production which, in its turn, leads to employment and income effects." According to the study "2002 Olympic Winter Games, Economic, Demographic and Fiscal Impacts", the estimated creation of new job years of employment was 35,424, and additional earnings of $1,544,203,000. It was noted that the increase of Olympic related job started in 1996 and continued until 2003. These effects can be estimated on the ground of historical relationship between job and corresponding population growth. A lot of people migrated into the future place of the Olympic Games for expanding and favorable employment opportunities that the Olympics ensured. Although residents occupied many of the higher paying jobs created by the Games, many of the vacated jobs were filled by immigrants who relocated for the better employment opportunities.

Basically, the immigration rate was even larger because the employees immigrated with their families. The additional people paid diverse taxes and fees from their income, creating additional revenue on the state and local levels.

=== Employment ===
Olympic related jobs in Utah started in 1996 with slight job opportunities of less than 100. However, from the job measurement conducted from 1996 to 2002, steady attainment of job opportunities established and a maximum level was noted in 2001 where there were 12,500 job opportunities attained yearly, and approximately 25,070 jobs created in 2002. Therefore, from 1996 to 2002 the sum of employment equated to 35,000 jobs which lasted a year. February 2002 is when the highest employment opportunities were created compared to other years. There were around 25,070 job opportunities created compared to 35,000 created from 1996 to 2001.

It is difficult to quantify the impact of the 2002 Olympics on the unemployment rates in Utah, due mostly to the effect of the early 2000s recession. In 1996, the unemployment rate in Utah was approximately 3.4%, while the U.S. national average was 5.4% and by the end of 2001, the unemployment rate in Utah was around 4.8%, while the national average had risen to 5.7%. There was a high percentage of visitors to the Games, which raised the number of tourists whose consumption and demand prompted the establishment of job opportunities to meet the demands.

=== 2034 Winter Olympics ===
In 2017, an exploratory committee was formed to consider a Salt Lake City bid for a future Winter Olympics. In December 2018, the United States Olympic Committee (USOC, now the United States Olympic & Paralympic Committee [USOPC]) named Salt Lake City as its preferred candidate to bid for a future Winter Olympics, citing that its experience and existing venues could be leveraged. In February 2022, amid the 2022 Winter Olympics and the 20th anniversary of the Games in Salt Lake City, the USOPC stated that it was "already in dialogue with the IOC, not yet for a specific year but as part of their evolving process", and acknowledged that there was "very high excitement and support from the local population."

In November 2023, the IOC's Future Host Commission recommended that Salt Lake City–Utah be invited to engage in "targeted dialogue" with the IOC Executive Board as preferred host for the 2034 Winter Olympics; the Future Host Commission cited the bid's reliance on private funding, as well as plans to reuse much of the infrastructure that was originally built for the 2002 Games.

On July 24, 2024, during the 142nd IOC Session in Paris just before the 2024 Summer Olympics in that city, Salt Lake City–Utah was selected to host the 2034 Winter Olympics and Paralympics. IOC President Thomas Bach said: "Salt Lake City and Utah are long-time friends of the Olympic Movement, and we are confident that they will organize exceptional Olympic and Paralympic Games, just as they did years ago. The legacy of 2002 is tangibly and passionately alive in Utah. The legacy of 2034 starts today." With the 2034 Winter Olympics, Salt Lake City will become the fourth city to host multiple Winter Games after Innsbruck (1964 and 1976), Lake Placid (1932 and 1980), and Cortina d'Ampezzo (1956 and 2026).

== Concerns and controversies ==
=== Disqualifications for doping ===
The 2002 Winter Olympics were the first Winter Olympics held after the formation of the World Anti-Doping Agency, resulting in the first instances of athletes being disqualified for failing drug testing. Athletes in cross-country skiing were disqualified for various reasons, including doping by two Russians and one Spaniard, leading Russia to file protests and threaten to withdraw from the competition.

=== Pairs figure skating judging controversy ===
A major scandal emerged during the pairs figure skating competition; the Canadian pair of Jamie Salé and David Pelletier narrowly lost to the Russian pair of Elena Berezhnaya and Anton Sikharulidze, despite the Canadians being deemed the favorites to win after their free skate program. The French judge Marie-Reine Le Gougne alleged that the head of the French Federation of Ice Sports, Didier Gailhaguet, had pressured her to judge the competition in favor of Russia regardless of performance. Amid criticisms of the incident by both Canadian and American media outlets, and suspicions that this was part of a vote swapping scheme with Russia to benefit the French ice dance team, the International Skating Union (ISU) voted to suspend Le Gougne for failing to immediately inform officials of Gailhaguet's actions. They also recommended to the IOC that the gold medal be jointly awarded to both pairs. An IOC panel voted in favor of the motion, resulting in both Salé and Pelletier, as well as Berezhnaya and Sikharulidze, being jointly awarded gold medals.

=== Disqualification of Kim Dong-Sung ===
In the final race A, with one lap remaining and currently in second place, Apolo Ohno of the United States attempted to make a pass on the leader Kim Dong-Sung of South Korea, who then drifted to the inside and as a result, Ohno raised his arms to imply he was blocked. Kim finished first ahead of Ohno, but the Australian referee James Hewish disqualified Kim for what appeared to be impeding, awarding the gold medal to Ohno.

The South Korean team immediately protested the decision of the chief official of the race, but their protests were denied by the International Skating Union (ISU). The South Korean team then appealed to the International Olympic Committee (IOC) and the Court of Arbitration for Sport (CAS). The IOC refused to see the case, stating, "This is a matter for the ISU to decide on. At this time, the IOC has received no proposal and taken no action".

The disqualification of Kim upset South Korean supporters, many of whom directed their anger at Ohno and the IOC. A large number of e-mails protesting the race results crashed the IOC's email server, and thousands of accusatory letters, many of which contained death threats, were sent to Ohno and the IOC. South Korean media accused Ohno of simulating foul, using the Konglish word "Hollywood action". The controversy continued at the 2002 FIFA World Cup, held jointly in South Korea and Japan several months after the Olympics. When the South Korean soccer team scored a goal during the group stage match against the U.S. team, South Korean players Ahn Jung-Hwan and Lee Chun-Soo made an exaggerated move imitating the move Ohno had made during the speed skating event to imply the other athlete had drifted into his lane.

== See also ==
- 2002 Winter Paralympics
- Olympic Games held in the United States
  - 1904 Summer Olympics – St. Louis
  - 1932 Summer Olympics – Los Angeles
  - 1932 Winter Olympics – Lake Placid
  - 1960 Winter Olympics – Squaw Valley
  - 1980 Winter Olympics – Lake Placid
  - 1984 Summer Olympics – Los Angeles
  - 1996 Summer Olympics – Atlanta
  - 2002 Winter Olympics – Salt Lake City
  - 2028 Summer Olympics – Los Angeles
  - 2034 Winter Olympics – Salt Lake City
- List of IOC country codes
- 2007 Winter Deaflympics
- Category:Competitors at the 2002 Winter Olympics

Winter Olympics
Preceded by Nagano	XIX Olympic Winter Games; Salt Lake City; 2002	Succeeded by Turin
