= Speed skating at the 2003 Asian Winter Games =

- Venue: Nagane Park Speed Skating Rink
- Dates: 2–5 February 2003
- Competitors: 63 from 5 nations

Speed skating at the 2003 Asian Winter Games took place in the Nagane Park Speed Skating Rink located in the city of Hachinohe, Aomori Prefecture, Japan with nine events contested — five for men and four for women.

== Schedule ==
●	Race	●	Last race	●	Final

Event↓/Date →	2nd Sun	3rd Mon	4th Tue	5th Wed
Men's 500 m	●	●		
Men's 1000 m				F
Men's 1500 m		F		
Men's 5000 m	F			
Men's 10000 m				F
Women's 500 m	●	●		
Women's 1000 m				F
Women's 1500 m		F		
Women's 3000 m	F			

== Medalists ==
=== Men ===
Event	Gold	Silver	Bronze
500 m	Hiroyasu Shimizu; Japan	Tomonori Kawata; Japan	Joji Kato; Japan
1000 m	Lee Kyou-hyuk; South Korea	Hiroyasu Shimizu; Japan	Takaharu Nakajima; Japan
1500 m	Lee Kyou-hyuk; South Korea	Mun Jun; South Korea	Yeo Sang-yeop; South Korea
5000 m	Takahiro Nozaki; Japan	Radik Bikchentayev; Kazakhstan	Kesato Miyazaki; Japan
10000 m	Hiroki Hirako; Japan	Kesato Miyazaki; Japan	Naoki Yasuda; Japan

=== Women ===
Event	Gold	Silver	Bronze
500 m	Wang Manli; China	Yukari Watanabe; Japan	Sayuri Osuga; Japan
1000 m	Aki Tonoike; Japan	Wang Manli; China	Shihomi Shinya; Japan
1500 m	Maki Tabata; Japan	Aki Tonoike; Japan	Baek Eun-bi; South Korea
3000 m	Maki Tabata; Japan	Baek Eun-bi; South Korea	Eriko Ishino; Japan

== Medal table ==
Rank	Nation	Gold	Silver	Bronze	Total
1	Japan (JPN)	6	5	7	18
2	South Korea (KOR)	2	2	2	6
3	China (CHN)	1	1	0	2
4	Kazakhstan (KAZ)	0	1	0	1
Totals (4 entries)		9	9	9	27

== Participating nations ==
A total of 63 athletes from 5 nations competed in speed skating at the 2003 Asian Winter Games:

- China (15)
- Japan (20)
- Kazakhstan (7)
- Mongolia (4)
- South Korea (17)
