= Cross-country skiing at the 2003 Asian Winter Games =

Asian/Japan games

- Venue: Ajara Athletic Park
- Dates: 2–7 February 2003
- Competitors: 51 from 9 nations

Cross-country skiing at the 2003 Asian Winter Games was held at the Ajara Athletic Park in Ōwani, Japan from 2 February to 7 February 2003.

== Schedule ==
F	Final

Event↓/Date →	2nd Sun	3rd Mon	4th Tue	5th Wed	6th Thu	7th Fri
Men's 10 km classical	F					
Men's 15 km freestyle		F				
Men's 30 km freestyle				F		
Men's 4 × 10 km relay						F
Women's 5 km classical	F					
Women's 10 km freestyle			F			
Women's 4 × 5 km relay					F	

== Medalists ==
=== Men ===
Event	Gold	Silver	Bronze
10 km classical	Andrey Golovko; Kazakhstan	Maxim Odnodvortsev; Kazakhstan	Dmitriy Yeremenko; Kazakhstan
15 km freestyle	Maxim Odnodvortsev; Kazakhstan	Masaaki Kozu; Japan	Zhang Chengye; China
30 km freestyle	Maxim Odnodvortsev; Kazakhstan	Zhang Chengye; China	Dmitriy Yeremenko; Kazakhstan
4 × 10 km relay	Japan; Katsuhito Ebisawa; Hiroyuki Imai; Mitsuo Horigome; Masaaki Kozu	Kazakhstan; Andrey Golovko; Nikolay Chebotko; Dmitriy Yeremenko; Maxim Odnodvortsev	China; Li Geliang; Han Dawei; Zhang Chengye; Qu Donghai

=== Women ===
Event	Gold	Silver	Bronze
5 km classical	Svetlana Malahova-Shishkina; Kazakhstan	Oxana Yatskaya; Kazakhstan	Yelena Antonova; Kazakhstan
10 km freestyle	Oxana Yatskaya; Kazakhstan	Svetlana Malahova-Shishkina; Kazakhstan	Hou Yuxia; China
4 × 5 km relay	Kazakhstan; Yelena Antonova; Oxana Yatskaya; Darya Starostina; Svetlana Malahova-Shishkina	Japan; Madoka Natsumi; Nobuko Fukuda; Sumiko Yokoyama; Chizuru Soneta	China; Luan Zhengrong; Hou Yuxia; Li Hongxue; Liu Hongyan

== Medal table ==
Rank	Nation	Gold	Silver	Bronze	Total
1	Kazakhstan (KAZ)	6	4	3	13
2	Japan (JPN)	1	2	0	3
3	China (CHN)	0	1	4	5
Totals (3 entries)		7	7	7	21

== Participating nations ==
A total of 51 athletes from 9 nations competed in cross-country skiing at the 2003 Asian Winter Games:

- China (8)
- India (2)
- Iran (4)
- Japan (10)
- Kazakhstan (11)
- Mongolia (6)
- Nepal (1)
- South Korea (8)
- Thailand (1)
