= Cross-country skiing at the 2003 Asian Winter Games – Men's 15 kilometre freestyle =

Men's 15 kilometre freestyle at the 2003 Asian Winter Games
- Venue: Ajara Athletic Park
- Dates: 3 February 2003
- Competitors: 24 from 8 nations

Medalists
gold medal	Maxim Odnodvortsev	Kazakhstan
silver medal	Masaaki Kozu	Japan
bronze medal	Zhang Chengye	China

The men's 15 kilometre freestyle at the 2003 Asian Winter Games was held on February 3, 2003 at Ajara Athletic Park, Japan.

== Schedule ==
All times are Japan Standard Time (UTC+09:00)

Date	Time	Event
Monday, 3 February 2003	10:00	Final

== Results ==
Rank	Athlete	Time
1st place, gold medalist(s)	Maxim Odnodvortsev (KAZ)	35:54.3
2nd place, silver medalist(s)	Masaaki Kozu (JPN)	36:01.2
3rd place, bronze medalist(s)	Zhang Chengye (CHN)	36:13.7
4	Hiroyuki Imai (JPN)	36:49.4
5	Andrey Golovko (KAZ)	37:05.0
6	Mitsuo Horigome (JPN)	37:21.2
7	Dmitriy Yeremenko (KAZ)	37:21.3
8	Nikolay Chebotko (KAZ)	37:37.5
9	Tomio Kanamaru (JPN)	37:50.7
10	Park Byung-joo (KOR)	38:01.7
11	Shin Doo-sun (KOR)	38:28.1
12	Qu Donghai (CHN)	38:51.3
13	Jung Eui-myung (KOR)	39:34.4
14	Mostafa Mirhashemi (IRI)	43:41.4
15	Mohammad Taghi Shemshaki (IRI)	43:50.5
16	Mojtaba Mirhashemi (IRI)	46:16.0
17	Meisam Sologhani (IRI)	46:57.2
18	Khürelbaataryn Khash-Erdene (MGL)	48:00.6
19	Jambalsürengiin Enkhselenge (MGL)	48:11.8
20	Jargalyn Erdenetülkhüür (MGL)	48:29.6
21	Vijendra Singh (IND)	51:31.3
22	Janzibyn Bazarkhüü (MGL)	52:20.5
23	Nisar Ahmed (IND)	52:46.8
24	Prawat Nagvajara (THA)	53:51.2
