= Cross-country skiing at the 2003 Asian Winter Games – Men's 4 × 10 kilometre relay =

Men's 4 × 10 kilometre relay at the 2003 Asian Winter Games
- Venue: Ajara Athletic Park
- Dates: 7 February 2003
- Competitors: 24 from 6 nations

Medalists
gold medal	Japan; Katsuhito Ebisawa, Hiroyuki Imai, Mitsuo Horigome, Masaaki Kozu
silver medal	Kazakhstan; Andrey Golovko, Nikolay Chebotko, Dmitriy Yeremenko, Maxim Odnodvortsev
bronze medal	China; Li Geliang, Han Dawei, Zhang Chengye, Qu Donghai

The men's 4 × 10 kilometre relay at the 2003 Asian Winter Games was held on February 7, 2003 at Ajara Athletic Park, Japan.

== Schedule ==
All times are Japan Standard Time (UTC+09:00)

Date	Time	Event
Friday, 7 February 2003	10:00	Final

== Results ==
Rank	Team	Time
1st place, gold medalist(s)	Japan (JPN)	1:43:49.2
	Katsuhito Ebisawa	27:27.7
	Hiroyuki Imai	26:37.6
	Mitsuo Horigome	24:20.0
	Masaaki Kozu	25:23.9
2nd place, silver medalist(s)	Kazakhstan (KAZ)	1:44:46.5
	Andrey Golovko	27:26.5
	Nikolay Chebotko	27:35.9
	Dmitriy Yeremenko	25:16.3
	Maxim Odnodvortsev	24:27.8
3rd place, bronze medalist(s)	China (CHN)	1:48:14.8
	Li Geliang	28:23.2
	Han Dawei	28:08.8
	Zhang Chengye	24:33.7
	Qu Donghai	27:09.1
4	South Korea (KOR)	1:53:18.1
	Shin Doo-sun	29:40.8
	Choi Im-heon	30:03.4
	Park Byung-joo	25:55.3
	Jung Eui-myung	27:38.6
5	Iran (IRI)	2:06:09.2
	Mohammad Taghi Shemshaki	33:07.6
	Meisam Sologhani	34:02.0
	Mojtaba Mirhashemi	30:01.2
	Mostafa Mirhashemi	28:58.4
6	Mongolia (MGL)	2:06:33.1
	Janzibyn Bazarkhüü	32:24.3
	Jargalyn Erdenetülkhüür	30:59.3
	Jambalsürengiin Enkhselenge	31:53.6
	Khürelbaataryn Khash-Erdene	31:15.9
