= Alpine skiing at the 2003 Asian Winter Games =

- Venue: Owani Onsen Ski Area
- Dates: 2–7 February 2003
- Competitors: 57 from 13 nations

Alpine skiing at the 2003 Asian Winter Games was held at the Owani Onsen Ski Area in Ōwani, Japan from 2 February to 7 February 2003.

== Schedule ==
F	Final

Event↓/Date →	2nd Sun	3rd Mon	4th Tue	5th Wed	6th Thu	7th Fri
Men's slalom	F					
Men's giant slalom						F
Women's slalom		F				
Women's giant slalom				F		

== Medalists ==
=== Men ===
Event	Gold	Silver	Bronze
Slalom	Kiminobu Kimura; Japan	Niki Fürstauer; Lebanon	Tetsuya Otaki; Japan
Giant slalom	Niki Fürstauer; Lebanon	Tetsuya Otaki; Japan	Masami Kudo; Japan

=== Women ===
Event	Gold	Silver	Bronze
Slalom	Chika Takeda; Japan	Hiromi Yumoto; Japan	Oh Jae-eun; South Korea
Giant slalom	Reina Umehara; Japan	Hiromi Yumoto; Japan	Noriko Fukushima; Japan

== Medal table ==
Rank	Nation	Gold	Silver	Bronze	Total
1	Japan (JPN)	3	3	3	9
2	Lebanon (LIB)	1	1	0	2
3	South Korea (KOR)	0	0	1	1
Totals (3 entries)		4	4	4	12

== Participating nations ==
A total of 57 athletes from 13 nations competed in alpine skiing at the 2003 Asian Winter Games:

- China (8)
- India (3)
- Iran (4)
- Japan (9)
- Kazakhstan (5)
- Lebanon (6)
- Mongolia (1)
- Nepal (2)
- Pakistan (6)
- Palestine (1)
- South Korea (8)
- Tajikistan (3)
- Uzbekistan (1)
