= Cross-country skiing at the 2003 Asian Winter Games – Men's 10 kilometre classical =

Men's 10 kilometre classical at the 2003 Asian Winter Games
- Venue: Ajara Athletic Park
- Dates: 2 February 2003
- Competitors: 25 from 7 nations

Medalists
gold medal	Andrey Golovko	Kazakhstan
silver medal	Maxim Odnodvortsev	Kazakhstan
bronze medal	Dmitriy Yeremenko	Kazakhstan

The men's 10 kilometre classical at the 2003 Asian Winter Games was held on February 2, 2003, at Ajara Athletic Park, Japan.

== Schedule ==
All times are Japan Standard Time (UTC+09:00)

Date	Time	Event
Sunday, 2 February 2003	11:20	Final

== Results ==
Rank	Athlete	Time
1st place, gold medalist(s)	Andrey Golovko (KAZ)	26:00.7
2nd place, silver medalist(s)	Maxim Odnodvortsev (KAZ)	26:29.0
3rd place, bronze medalist(s)	Dmitriy Yeremenko (KAZ)	26:57.4
4	Nikolay Chebotko (KAZ)	27:03.1
5	Hiroyuki Imai (JPN)	27:05.2
6	Masaaki Kozu (JPN)	27:27.6
7	Katsuhito Ebisawa (JPN)	27:56.6
8	Mitsuo Horigome (JPN)	28:08.9
9	Park Byung-joo (KOR)	28:15.7
10	Zhang Chengye (CHN)	28:25.4
11	Han Dawei (CHN)	28:30.5
12	Li Geliang (CHN)	29:04.6
13	Choi Im-heon (KOR)	29:31.7
14	Shin Doo-sun (KOR)	29:37.0
15	Yoon Sung-soon (KOR)	30:48.3
16	Jargalyn Erdenetülkhüür (MGL)	32:27.6
17	Mostafa Mirhashemi (IRI)	34:23.6
18	Jambalsürengiin Enkhselenge (MGL)	35:45.0
19	Mohammad Taghi Shemshaki (IRI)	35:45.6
20	Khürelbaataryn Khash-Erdene (MGL)	36:02.7
21	Meisam Sologhani (IRI)	36:11.9
22	Mojtaba Mirhashemi (IRI)	37:07.1
23	Janzibyn Bazarkhüü (MGL)	38:56.7
24	Nisar Ahmed (IND)	42:17.1
25	Vijendra Singh (IND)	45:14.9
