= Cross-country skiing at the Asian Winter Games =

- Governing bodies: FIS (World) / ASF (Asia)
- Events: 6 (men: 3; women: 3)

Games
- 1986; 1990; 1996; 1999; 2003; 2007; 2011; 2017; 2025
- Medalists

Cross-country skiing has been contested at the Asian Winter Games since the first Winter Games in 1986.

== Editions ==
Games	Year	Host city	Best nation
I	1986	Sapporo, Japan	Japan
II	1990	Sapporo, Japan	Japan
III	1996	Harbin, China	Kazakhstan
IV	1999	Gangwon, South Korea	Kazakhstan
V	2003	Aomori, Japan	Kazakhstan
VI	2007	Changchun, China	Kazakhstan
VII	2011	Astana–Almaty, Kazakhstan	Kazakhstan
VIII	2017	Sapporo, Japan	Japan
IX	2025	Harbin, China	China

== Events ==
Legend

- C — Classical
- F — Freestyle

Event	86	90	96	99	03	07	11	17	25	Years
Men's sprint						F	C	C	C	4
Men's team sprint							F			1
Men's 10 km			C		C		C	C	F	5
Men's 15 km	C	C	F	C	F		F	F		7
Men's 30 km	F	F		F	F	F	C	F		7
Men's relay	X	X	X	X	X	X	X	X	X	9
Women's sprint						F	C	C	C	4
Women's team sprint							F			1
Women's 5 km	C		C	C	C	C	C	C	F	8
Women's 10 km	F	C	F	F	F		F	F		7
Women's 15 km		F					C	F		3
Women's relay	X	X	X	X	X	X	X	X	X	9
Total	6	6	6	6	7	6	12	10	6	

== Medal table ==
Rank	Nation	Gold	Silver	Bronze	Total
1	Japan (JPN)	28	26	15	69
2	Kazakhstan (KAZ)	26	24	16	66
3	China (CHN)	9	10	22	41
4	South Korea (KOR)	2	5	9	16
5	North Korea (PRK)	0	0	3	3
6	Mongolia (MGL)	0	0	1	1
Totals (6 entries)		65	65	66	196
