= Cross-country skiing at the 2003 Asian Winter Games – Men's 30 kilometre freestyle =

Men's 30 kilometre freestyle at the 2003 Asian Winter Games
- Venue: Ajara Athletic Park
- Dates: 5 February 2003
- Competitors: 18 from 7 nations

Medalists
| gold medal | Maxim Odnodvortsev | Kazakhstan |
| silver medal | Zhang Chengye | China |
| bronze medal | Dmitriy Yeremenko | Kazakhstan |

The men's 30 kilometre freestyle at the 2003 Asian Winter Games was held on February 5, 2003 at Ajara Athletic Park, Japan.

== Schedule ==
All times are Japan Standard Time (UTC+09:00)

| Date | Time | Event |
|---|---|---|
| Wednesday, 5 February 2003 | 10:00 | Final |

== Results ==
Legend

- DNF — Did not finish
- DNS — Did not start

| Rank | Athlete | Time |
|---|---|---|
| 1st place, gold medalist(s) | Maxim Odnodvortsev (KAZ) | 1:19:20.9 |
| 2nd place, silver medalist(s) | Zhang Chengye (CHN) | 1:20:35.9 |
| 3rd place, bronze medalist(s) | Dmitriy Yeremenko (KAZ) | 1:21:02.8 |
| 4 | Denis Krivushkin (KAZ) | 1:23:13.0 |
| 5 | Tomio Kanamaru (JPN) | 1:24:03.7 |
| 6 | Masaaki Kozu (JPN) | 1:24:38.7 |
| 7 | Hiroyuki Imai (JPN) | 1:25:27.8 |
| 8 | Igor Zubrilin (KAZ) | 1:25:53.0 |
| 9 | Katsuhito Ebisawa (JPN) | 1:26:24.4 |
| 10 | Yoon Sung-soon (KOR) | 1:33:49.1 |
| 11 | Mohammad Taghi Shemshaki (IRI) | 1:36:38.5 |
| 12 | Mojtaba Mirhashemi (IRI) | 1:41:49.4 |
| 13 | Mostafa Mirhashemi (IRI) | 1:42:24.6 |
| 14 | Prawat Nagvajara (THA) | 2:07:59.0 |
| 15 | Dachhiri Sherpa (NEP) | 2:17:51.3 |
| — | Choi Im-heon (KOR) | DNF |
| — | Jung Eui-myung (KOR) | DNF |
| — | Meisam Sologhani (IRI) | DNS |
