= Figure skating at the 2003 Asian Winter Games =

- Venue: Aomori Prefectural Skating Rink
- Dates: 2–4 February 2003
- Competitors: 45 from 7 nations

Figure skating at the 2003 Asian Winter Games took place in the Aomori Prefectural Skating Rink located in Aomori City, Japan with four events contested.

The competition took place from 2 to 4 February 2003.

== Schedule ==
S	Short program	F	Free skating

Event↓/Date →	2nd Sun	3rd Mon	4th Tue
Men's singles	S	F	
Women's singles		S	F
Pairs	S		F
Ice dance	S	S	F

== Medalists ==
Event	Gold	Silver	Bronze
Men's singles	Takeshi Honda; Japan	Li Chengjiang; China	Zhang Min; China
Women's singles	Shizuka Arakawa; Japan	Fumie Suguri; Japan	Yukari Nakano; Japan
Pairs	China; Zhao Hongbo; Shen Xue	China; Tong Jian; Pang Qing	Uzbekistan; Artem Knyazev; Marina Aganina
Ice dance	China; Cao Xianming; Zhang Weina	Japan; Akiyuki Kido; Nozomi Watanabe	Japan; Kenji Miyamoto; Rie Arikawa

== Medal table ==
Rank	Nation	Gold	Silver	Bronze	Total
1	Japan (JPN)	2	2	2	6
2	China (CHN)	2	2	1	5
3	Uzbekistan (UZB)	0	0	1	1
Totals (3 entries)		4	4	4	12

== Participating nations ==
A total of 45 athletes from 7 nations competed in figure skating at the 2003 Asian Winter Games:

- China (14)
- Chinese Taipei (1)
- Japan (12)
- North Korea (4)
- South Korea (7)
- Thailand (4)
- Uzbekistan (3)
