= Snowboarding at the Asian Winter Games =

- Governing bodies: FIS (World) / ASF (Asia)
- Events: 6 (men: 3; women: 3)

Games
- 1986; 1990; 1996; 1999; 2003; 2007; 2011; 2017; 2025
- Medalists

Snowboarding has been featured as a sport in the Asian Winter Games since the fifth winter games in 2003.

== Editions ==
Games	Year	Host city	Best nation
V	2003	Aomori, Japan	Japan
VI	2007	Changchun, China	Japan
VIII	2017	Sapporo, Japan	China
IX	2025	Harbin, China	China

== Events ==
Event	03	07	17	25	Years
Men's big air				X	1
Men's halfpipe	X	X	X	X	4
Men's slopestyle				X	1
Men's slalom	X		X		2
Men's giant slalom	X		X		2
Women's big air				X	1
Women's halfpipe	d	X	X	X	3
Women's slopestyle				X	1
Women's slalom	d		X		1
Women's giant slalom	d		X		1
Total	3	2	6	6	

== Medal table ==
Rank	Nation	Gold	Silver	Bronze	Total
1	Japan (JPN)	7	7	8	22
2	China (CHN)	6	7	3	16
3	South Korea (KOR)	4	3	6	13
Totals (3 entries)		17	17	17	51

== Participating nations ==
Nation	03	07	17	25	Years
Afghanistan				3	1
Australia			4		1
Cambodia				4	1
China		8	15	12	3
Chinese Taipei	1	1			2
India			1		1
Iran	4	2	6		3
Japan	14	4	10	10	4
Kazakhstan			4		1
Kyrgyzstan		4			1
Lebanon	1	1	2	4	4
Mongolia		1			1
Philippines			1		1
Qatar				1	1
South Korea	6	8	12	10	4
Sri Lanka			1		1
Thailand				1	1
United Arab Emirates				2	1
Vietnam			2		1
Number of nations	5	8	11	9	
Number of athletes	26	29	58	47	
