= Freestyle skiing at the Asian Winter Games =

- Governing bodies: FIS (World) / ASF (Asia)
- Events: 6 (men: 3; women: 3)

Games
- 1986; 1990; 1996; 1999; 2003; 2007; 2011; 2017; 2025
- Medalists

Freestyle skiing has been featured as a sport in the Asian Winter Games since the third winter games in 1996.

== Editions ==
Games	Year	Host city	Best nation
III	1996	Harbin, China	China
V	2003	Aomori, Japan	Japan
VI	2007	Changchun, China	China
VII	2011	Astana–Almaty, Kazakhstan	Kazakhstan
VIII	2017	Sapporo, Japan	Japan
IX	2025	Harbin, China	China

== Events ==
Event	96	03	07	11	17	25	Years
Men's aerials	X		X	X		X	4
Men's aerials synchro						X	1
Men's moguls		X		X	X		3
Men's dual moguls				X	X		2
Men's big air						X	1
Men's halfpipe						X	1
Men's slopestyle						X	1
Women's aerials	X		X	X		X	4
Women's aerials synchro						X	1
Women's moguls		X		X	X		3
Women's dual moguls				X	X		2
Women's big air						X	1
Women's halfpipe						X	1
Women's slopestyle						X	1
Mixed team aerials						X	1
Total	2	2	2	6	4	11	

== Medal table ==
Rank	Nation	Gold	Silver	Bronze	Total
1	China (CHN)	13	13	9	35
2	Japan (JPN)	7	7	7	21
3	Kazakhstan (KAZ)	6	5	7	18
4	South Korea (KOR)	1	2	3	6
5	Mongolia (MGL)	0	0	1	1
5	Thailand (THA)	0	0	1	1
5	Uzbekistan (UZB)	0	0	1	1
Totals (7 entries)		27	27	29	83

== Participating nations ==
Nation	96	03	07	11	17	25	Years
Australia					4		1
China	8		8	10	7	19	5
Chinese Taipei			1				1
Japan	X	8	2	5	8	9	6
Kazakhstan		4		8	4	7	
Kuwait						1	1
Mongolia		1	2	5	2		
Philippines						1	1
South Korea				4	5	11	3
Thailand					1	1	2
United Arab Emirates						2	1
Uzbekistan	X						1
Number of nations		3	4	5	7	8	
Number of athletes		13	13	32	31	51	
