= Snowboarding at the 2003 Asian Winter Games =

- Venue: Ajigasawa Ski Area
- Dates: 2–4 February 2003
- Competitors: 26 from 5 nations

Snowboarding was featured as part of the 2003 Asian Winter Games at the Ajigasawa Ski Area in Aomori, Japan. Events were held from 2 February to 4 February 2003.

Women's competitions were conducted demonstration sport. The host nation Japan was the only nation and dominated the competition by winning all three gold medals.

== Schedule ==
Q	Qualification	F	Final

Event↓/Date →	2nd Sun		3rd Mon	4th Tue
Men's halfpipe	Q	F		
Men's slalom				F
Men's giant slalom			F	

== Medalists ==
Event	Gold	Silver	Bronze
Men's halfpipe	Daisuke Murakami; Japan	Takaharu Nakai; Japan	Han Jin-bae; South Korea
Men's slalom	Kohei Kawaguchi; Japan	Ji Myung-kon; South Korea	Kentaro Tsuruoka; Japan
Men's giant slalom	Kohei Kawaguchi; Japan	Teruumi Fujimoto; Japan	Kentaro Tsuruoka; Japan

== Medal table ==
Rank	Nation	Gold	Silver	Bronze	Total
1	Japan (JPN)	3	2	2	7
2	South Korea (KOR)	0	1	1	2
Totals (2 entries)		3	3	3	9

== Demonstration events ==
=== Medalists ===
Event	Gold	Silver	Bronze
Women's halfpipe	Soko Yamaoka; Japan	Maho Yoshimi; Japan	Chiyoko Iwabuchi; Japan
Women's slalom	Ran Iida; Japan	Eri Yanetani; Japan	Tomoka Takeuchi; Japan
Women's giant slalom	Ran Iida; Japan	Tomoka Takeuchi; Japan	Eri Yanetani; Japan

=== Women's halfpipe ===
2 February

Rank	Athlete	Election	Final
1st place, gold medalist(s)	Soko Yamaoka (JPN)	38.5	40.2
2nd place, silver medalist(s)	Maho Yoshimi (JPN)	32.7	32.9
3rd place, bronze medalist(s)	Chiyoko Iwabuchi (JPN)	36.5	29.9

=== Women's slalom ===
4 February

Rank	Athlete	1st run	2nd run	Total
1st place, gold medalist(s)	Ran Iida (JPN)	54.95	54.70	1:49.65
2nd place, silver medalist(s)	Eri Yanetani (JPN)	55.17	55.09	1:50.26
3rd place, bronze medalist(s)	Tomoka Takeuchi (JPN)	57.95	58.46	1:56.41

=== Women's giant slalom ===
3 February

Rank	Athlete	1st run	2nd run	Total
1st place, gold medalist(s)	Ran Iida (JPN)	1:14.17	1:16.30	2:30.47
2nd place, silver medalist(s)	Tomoka Takeuchi (JPN)	1:12.76	1:18.21	2:30.97
3rd place, bronze medalist(s)	Eri Yanetani (JPN)	1:14.89	1:16.50	2:31.39

== Participating nations ==
A total of 26 athletes from 5 nations competed in snowboarding at the 2003 Asian Winter Games:

- Chinese Taipei (1)
- Iran (4)
- Japan (14)
- Lebanon (1)
- South Korea (6)
