= List of Asian Games medalists in snowboarding =

This is the complete list of Asian Winter Games medalists in snowboarding from 2003 to 2025.

== Men ==
=== Big air ===
Games	Gold	Silver	Bronze
2025 Harbin	Yang Wenlong (CHN)	Jiang Xinjie (CHN)	Kang Dong-hun (KOR)

=== Halfpipe ===
Games	Gold	Silver	Bronze
2003 Aomori	Daisuke Murakami (JPN)	Takaharu Nakai (JPN)	Han Jin-bae (KOR)
2007 Changchun	Kazuhiro Kokubo (JPN)	Shi Wancheng (CHN)	Daisuke Murakami (JPN)
2017 Sapporo	Zhang Yiwei (CHN)	Kweon Lee-jun (KOR)	Ayumu Nedefuji (JPN)
2025 Harbin	Kim Geon-hui (KOR)	Koyata Kikuchihara (JPN)	Lee Ji-o (KOR)

=== Slopestyle ===
Games	Gold	Silver	Bronze
2025 Harbin	Lee Chae-un (KOR)	Liu Haoyu (CHN)	Kang Dong-hun (KOR)

=== Slalom ===
Games	Gold	Silver	Bronze
2003 Aomori	Kohei Kawaguchi (JPN)	Ji Myung-kon (KOR)	Kentaro Tsuruoka (JPN)
2017 Sapporo	Lee Sang-ho (KOR)	Yuya Suzuki (JPN)	Kim Sang-kyum (KOR)

=== Giant slalom ===
Games	Gold	Silver	Bronze
2003 Aomori	Kohei Kawaguchi (JPN)	Teruumi Fujimoto (JPN)	Kentaro Tsuruoka (JPN)
2017 Sapporo	Lee Sang-ho (KOR)	Choi Bo-gun (KOR)	Shinnosuke Kamino (JPN)

== Women ==
=== Big air ===
Games	Gold	Silver	Bronze
2025 Harbin	Xiong Shirui (CHN)	Zhang Xiaonan (CHN)	Suzuka Ishimoto (JPN)

=== Halfpipe ===
Games	Gold	Silver	Bronze
2007 Changchun	Shiho Nakashima (JPN)	Soko Yamaoka (JPN)	Liu Jiayu (CHN)
2017 Sapporo	Liu Jiayu (CHN)	Cai Xuetong (CHN)	Kurumi Imai (JPN)
2025 Harbin	Sara Shimizu (JPN)	Sena Tomita (JPN)	Wu Shaotong (CHN)

=== Slopestyle ===
Games	Gold	Silver	Bronze
2025 Harbin	Zhang Xiaonan (CHN)	Xiong Shirui (CHN)	Himari Ishii (JPN)

=== Slalom ===
Games	Gold	Silver	Bronze
2017 Sapporo	Zang Ruxin (CHN)	Eri Yanetani (JPN)	Shin Da-hae (KOR)

=== Giant slalom ===
Games	Gold	Silver	Bronze
2017 Sapporo	Eri Yanetani (JPN)	Zang Ruxin (CHN)	Gong Naiying (CHN)
