= Japan at the 2003 Asian Winter Games =

- IOC code: JPN
- NOC: Japanese Olympic Committee

in Aomori
- Competitors: 237 in 11 sports
- Flag bearer: Tomomi Okazaki
- Medals Ranked 1st: Gold 24 Silver 23 Bronze 20 Total 67

Asian Winter Games appearances
- 1986; 1990; 1996; 1999; 2003; 2007; 2011; 2017; 2025; 2029

Japan participated and hosted the 2003 Asian Winter Games held in Aomori Prefecture, from February 1, 2003, to February 8, 2003. This country garnered 24 gold medals securing its top spot in the medal tally.

== Medal summary ==
=== Medal table ===
Sport	Gold	Silver	Bronze	Total
Speed skating	6	5	7	18
Biathlon	4	3	2	9
Alpine skiing	3	3	3	9
Snowboarding	3	2	2	7
Figure skating	2	2	2	6
Freestyle skiing	2	1	1	4
Cross-country skiing	1	2	0	3
Ski jumping	1	2	0	3
Curling	1	1	0	2
Ice hockey	1	1	0	2
Short-track speed skating	0	1	3	4
Totals (11 entries)	24	23	20	67

=== Medalists ===
Medal	Name	Sport	Event	Date
Gold	Kiminobu Kimura	Alpine skiing	Men's slalom	2 February
Gold	Daisuke Murakami	Snowboarding	Men's halfpipe	2 February
Gold	Takahiro Nozaki	Speed skating	Men's 5000 m	2 February
Gold	Maki Tabata	Speed skating	Women's 3000 m	2 February
Gold	Chika Takeda	Alpine skiing	Women's slalom	3 February
Gold	Hironao Meguro	Biathlon	Men's sprint	3 February
Gold	Takeshi Honda	Figure skating	Men's singles	3 February
Gold	Kohei Kawaguchi	Snowboarding	Men's giant slalom	3 February
Gold	Maki Tabata	Speed skating	Women's 1500 m	3 February
Gold	Hiroyasu Shimizu	Speed skating	Men's 500 m	3 February
Gold	Shizuka Arakawa	Figure skating	Women's singles	4 February
Gold	Kazuyoshi Funaki	Ski jumping	Men's normal hill individual	4 February
Gold	Kohei Kawaguchi	Snowboarding	Men's slalom	4 February
Gold	Reina Umehara	Alpine skiing	Women's giant slalom	5 February
Gold	Hironao Meguro	Biathlon	Men's pursuit	5 February
Gold	Hiroki Hirako	Speed skating	Men's 10,000 m	5 February
Gold	Aki Tonoike	Speed skating	Women's 1000 m	5 February
Gold	Aiko Uemura	Freestyle skiing	Women's moguls	6 February
Gold	Yu Masukawa	Freestyle skiing	Men's moguls	6 February
Gold	Tamami Tanaka	Biathlon	Women's sprint	7 February
Gold	Sunao Noto; Hironao Meguro; Tatsumi Kasahara; Kyoji Suga	Biathlon	Men's relay	7 February
Gold	Katsuhito Ebisawa; Hiroyuki Imai; Mitsuo Horigome; Masaaki Kozu	Cross-country skiing	Men's 4 × 10 km relay	7 February
Gold	Shinobu Aota; Yukari Okazaki; Eriko Minatoya; Kotomi Ishizaki; Satomi Tsujii	Curling	Women's tournament	7 February
Gold	Akihito Sugisawa; Fumitaka Miyauchi; Makoto Kawashima; Joel Dyck; Robert Miwa; Yutaka Kawaguchi; Tomohiko Uchiyama; Yosuke Kon; Daisuke Obara; Tetsuya Saito; Masatoshi Ito; Takeshi Saito; Makoto Kawahira; Jiro Nihei; Daniel Daikawa; Kengo Ito; Naoya Kikuchi; Kiyoshi Fujita; Taro Nihei; Yoshikazu Kabayama; Koichi Yamazaki; Masahito Haruna; Ryan Kuwabara	Ice hockey	Men's tournament	7 February
Silver	Takaharu Nakai	Snowboarding	Men's halfpipe	2 February
Silver	Hiromi Yumoto	Alpine skiing	Women's slalom	3 February
Silver	Sunao Noto	Biathlon	Men's sprint	3 February
Silver	Masaaki Kozu	Cross-country skiing	Men's 15 km freestyle	3 February
Silver	Teruumi Fujimoto	Snowboarding	Men's giant slalom	3 February
Silver	Aki Tonoike	Speed skating	Women's 1500 m	3 February
Silver	Yukari Watanabe	Speed skating	Women's 500 m	3 February
Silver	Tomonori Kawata	Speed skating	Men's 500 m	3 February
Silver	Akiyuki Kido; Nozomi Watanabe	Figure skating	Ice dance	4 February
Silver	Fumie Suguri	Figure skating	Women's singles	4 February
Silver	Akira Higashi	Ski jumping	Men's normal hill individual	4 February
Silver	Hiromi Yumoto	Alpine skiing	Women's giant slalom	5 February
Silver	Sunao Noto	Biathlon	Men's pursuit	5 February
Silver	Yoko Kondo; Tomoko Sakagami; Hanae Kubo; Sayaka Sado; Masako Sato; Yoko Tamada; Yuki Togawa; Aki Tsuchida; Yuka Hirano; Tomoko Fujimoto; Chiaki Yamanaka; Shoko Nihonyanagi; Akiko Naka; Ami Mashiko; Taeko Kakumaru	Ice hockey	Women's tournament	5 February
Silver	Kesato Miyazaki	Speed skating	Men's 10,000 m	5 February
Silver	Hiroyasu Shimizu	Speed skating	Men's 1000 m	5 February
Silver	Madoka Natsumi; Nobuko Fukuda; Sumiko Yokoyama; Chizuru Soneta	Cross-country skiing	Women's 4 × 5 kilometre relay	6 February
Silver	Kenro Shimoyama	Freestyle skiing	Men's moguls	6 February
Silver	Takafumi Nishitani	Short-track speed skating	Men's 500 m	6 February
Silver	Akira Higashi; Yuta Watase; Yasuhiro Shibata; Kazuyoshi Funaki	Ski jumping	Men's normal hill team	6 February
Silver	Tetsuya Otaki	Alpine skiing	Men's giant slalom	7 February
Silver	Sanae Takano; Tamami Tanaka; Ikuyo Tsukidate; Kanae Suzuki	Biathlon	Women's relay	7 February
Silver	Hiroaki Kashiwagi; Keita Yanagizawa; Jun Nakayama; Kazuto Yanagizawa; Takanori Ichimura	Curling	Men's tournament	7 February
Bronze	Tetsuya Otaki	Alpine skiing	Men's slalom	2 February
Bronze	Kesato Miyazaki	Speed skating	Men's 5000 m	2 February
Bronze	Eriko Ishino	Speed skating	Women's 3000 m	2 February
Bronze	Tatsumi Kasahara	Biathlon	Men's sprint	3 February
Bronze	Kentaro Tsuruoka	Snowboarding	Men's giant slalom	3 February
Bronze	Sayuri Osuga	Speed skating	Women's 500 m	3 February
Bronze	Joji Kato	Speed skating	Men's 500 m	3 February
Bronze	Kenji Miyamoto; Rie Arikawa	Figure skating	Ice dance	4 February
Bronze	Yukari Nakano	Figure skating	Women's singles	4 February
Bronze	Kentaro Tsuruoka	Snowboarding	Men's slalom	4 February
Bronze	Noriko Fukushima	Alpine skiing	Women's giant slalom	5 February
Bronze	Kyoji Suga	Biathlon	Men's pursuit	5 February
Bronze	Naoki Yasuda	Speed skating	Men's 10,000 m	5 February
Bronze	Shihomi Shinya	Speed skating	Women's 1000 m	5 February
Bronze	Takaharu Nakajima	Speed skating	Men's 1000 m	5 February
Bronze	Yumi Kubota	Freestyle skiing	Women's moguls	6 February
Bronze	Masami Kudo	Alpine skiing	Men's giant slalom	7 February
Bronze	Satoru Terao	Short-track speed skating	Men's 1000 m	7 February
Bronze	Ikue Teshigawara; Yuka Kamino; Mika Ozawa; Yoko Iizuka	Short-track speed skating	Women's 3000 m relay	7 February
Bronze	Takafumi Nishitani; Satoru Terao; Yoshiharu Arino; Hayato Sueyoshi; Tomonori Ike	Short-track speed skating	Men's 5000 m relay	7 February
