= Alpine skiing at the 2003 Asian Winter Games – Women's slalom =

Women's slalom at the 2003 Asian Winter Games
- Venue: Owani Onsen Ski Area
- Dates: 3 February 2003
- Competitors: 18 from 6 nations

Medalists
gold medal	Chika Takeda	Japan
silver medal	Hiromi Yumoto	Japan
bronze medal	Oh Jae-eun	South Korea

The women's slalom at the 2003 Asian Winter Games was held on 5 February 2003 at Owani Onsen Ski Area, Japan.

== Schedule ==
All times are Japan Standard Time (UTC+09:00)

Date	Time	Event
Monday, 3 February 2003	10:00	1st run
Monday, 3 February 2003	12:30	2nd run

== Results ==
Legend

- DNF — Did not finish

Rank	Athlete	1st run	2nd run	Total
1st place, gold medalist(s)	Chika Takeda (JPN)	48.77	50.34	1:39.11
2nd place, silver medalist(s)	Hiromi Yumoto (JPN)	49.42	50.57	1:39.99
3rd place, bronze medalist(s)	Oh Jae-eun (KOR)	50.03	50.85	1:40.88
4	Reina Umehara (JPN)	50.37	51.47	1:41.84
5	Noriko Fukushima (JPN)	51.91	52.69	1:44.60
6	Erin Min (KOR)	53.64	52.16	1:45.80
7	Dong Jinzhi (CHN)	53.98	54.58	1:48.56
8	Olesya Persidskaya (KAZ)	54.77	55.55	1:50.32
9	Kang Bo-seong (KOR)	55.69	56.45	1:52.14
10	Souraya Frem (LIB)	56.65	56.55	1:53.20
11	Wen Xuexin (CHN)	59.03	58.95	1:57.98
12	Lyudmila Fedotova (KAZ)	59.81	1:00.79	2:00.60
13	Neha Ahuja (IND)	59.99	1:00.79	2:00.78
14	Vera Yeremenko (KAZ)	1:15.56	56.51	2:12.07
15	Nisrine Njeim (LIB)	55.94	1:17.06	2:13.00
—	Yoo Hye-min (KOR)		DNF	DNF
—	Song Yang (CHN)		DNF	DNF
—	Miao Liyan (CHN)	DNF		DNF
