= List of Asian Games medalists in freestyle skiing =

This is the complete list of Asian Winter Games medalists in freestyle skiing from 1996 to 2025.

== Men ==
=== Aerials ===
Games	Gold	Silver	Bronze
1996 Harbin	Ou Xiaotao (CHN)	Fei Dongpeng (CHN)	Sergey Brener (UZB)
2007 Changchun	Han Xiaopeng (CHN)	Qiu Sen (CHN)	Liu Zhongqing (CHN)
2007 Changchun	Han Xiaopeng (CHN)	Qiu Sen (CHN)	Kotaro Kurata (JPN)
2011 Astana–Almaty	Jia Zongyang (CHN)	Liu Zhongqing (CHN)	Ruslan Ablyatifov (KAZ)
2025 Harbin	Li Xinpeng (CHN)	Yang Longxiao (CHN)	Qi Guangpu (CHN)

=== Aerials synchro ===
Games	Gold	Silver	Bronze
2025 Harbin	Kazakhstan (KAZ); Roman Ivanov; Sherzod Khashirbayev	China (CHN); Geng Hu; Yang Yuheng	China (CHN); Li Xinpeng; Qi Guangpu

=== Moguls ===
Games	Gold	Silver	Bronze
2003 Aomori	Yu Masukawa (JPN)	Kenro Shimoyama (JPN)	Ivan Sidorov (KAZ)
2011 Astana–Almaty	Dmitriy Reiherd (KAZ)	Osamu Ueno (JPN)	Dmitriy Barmashov (KAZ)
2017 Sapporo	Ikuma Horishima (JPN)	Choi Jae-woo (KOR)	Dmitriy Reiherd (KAZ)

=== Dual moguls ===
Games	Gold	Silver	Bronze
2011 Astana–Almaty	Dmitriy Barmashov (KAZ)	Osamu Ueno (JPN)	Yugo Tsukita (JPN)
2017 Sapporo	Ikuma Horishima (JPN)	Daichi Hara (JPN)	Dmitriy Reiherd (KAZ)

=== Big air ===
Games	Gold	Silver	Bronze
2025 Harbin	Rai Kasamura (JPN)	Yoon Jong-hyun (KOR)	Shin Yeong-seop (KOR)

=== Halfpipe ===
Games	Gold	Silver	Bronze
2025 Harbin	Lee Seung-hun (KOR)	Sheng Haipeng (CHN)	Moon Hee-sung (KOR)

=== Slopestyle ===
Games	Gold	Silver	Bronze
2025 Harbin	Rai Kasamura (JPN)	Ruka Ito (JPN)	Paul Vieuxtemps (THA)

== Women ==
=== Aerials ===
Games	Gold	Silver	Bronze
1996 Harbin	Guo Dandan (CHN)	Xu Nannan (CHN)	Yin Hong (CHN)
2007 Changchun	Li Nina (CHN)	Xu Mengtao (CHN)	Zhang Xin (CHN)
2007 Changchun	Li Nina (CHN)	Xu Mengtao (CHN)	Ünenbatyn Maral (MGL)
2011 Astana–Almaty	Zhang Xin (CHN)	Zhibek Arapbayeva (KAZ)	Yang Yu (CHN)
2025 Harbin	Xu Mengtao (CHN)	Chen Xuezheng (CHN)	Ayana Zholdas (KAZ)

=== Aerials synchro ===
Games	Gold	Silver	Bronze
2025 Harbin	China (CHN); Feng Junxi; Wang Xue	China (CHN); Chen Meiting; Xu Mengtao	Kazakhstan (KAZ); Ardana Makhanova; Ayana Zholdas

=== Moguls ===
Games	Gold	Silver	Bronze
2003 Aomori	Aiko Uemura (JPN)	Irina Kormysheva (KAZ)	Yumi Kubota (JPN)
2011 Astana–Almaty	Yuliya Galysheva (KAZ)	Miki Ito (JPN)	Ning Qin (CHN)
2017 Sapporo	Arisa Murata (JPN)	Yuliya Galysheva (KAZ)	Miki Ito (JPN)

=== Dual moguls ===
Games	Gold	Silver	Bronze
2011 Astana–Almaty	Yuliya Galysheva (KAZ)	Yuliya Rodionova (KAZ)	Miki Ito (JPN)
2017 Sapporo	Yuliya Galysheva (KAZ)	Arisa Murata (JPN)	Miki Ito (JPN)

=== Big air ===
Games	Gold	Silver	Bronze
2025 Harbin	Liu Mengting (CHN)	Han Linshan (CHN)	Yang Ruyi (CHN)

=== Halfpipe ===
Games	Gold	Silver	Bronze
2025 Harbin	Li Fanghui (CHN)	Zhang Kexin (CHN)	Jang Yu-jin (KOR)

=== Slopestyle ===
Games	Gold	Silver	Bronze
2025 Harbin	Liu Mengting (CHN)	Yang Ruyi (CHN)	Han Linshan (CHN)

== Mixed ==
=== Team aerials ===
Games	Gold	Silver	Bronze
2025 Harbin	China (CHN); Xu Mengtao; Li Xinpeng; Qi Guangpu	Kazakhstan (KAZ); Ayana Zholdas; Sherzod Khashirbayev; Assylkhan Assan	Japan (JPN); Runa Igarashi; Yuta Nakagawa; Haruto Igarashi
