= Speed skating at the 2003 Asian Winter Games – Women's 3000 metres =

Women's 3000 metres at the 2003 Asian Winter Games
- Venue: Nagane Park Speed Skating Rink
- Dates: 2 February 2003
- Competitors: 10 from 4 nations

Medalists
| gold medal | Maki Tabata | Japan |
| silver medal | Baek Eun-bi | South Korea |
| bronze medal | Eriko Ishino | Japan |

The women's 3000 metres at the 2003 Asian Winter Games was held on 2 February 2003 in Hachinohe, Aomori Prefecture, Japan.

== Schedule ==
All times are Japan Standard Time (UTC+09:00)

| Date | Time | Event |
|---|---|---|
| Sunday, 2 February 2003 | 10:00 | Final |

== Records ==
Prior to this competition, the existing world and Games records were as follows.

| World Record | Claudia Pechstein (GER) | 3:57.70 | Salt Lake City, United States | 10 February 2002 |
| Games Record | Lyudmila Prokasheva (KAZ) | 4:25.98 | Harbin, China | 5 February 1996 |

== Results ==
Legend

- DSQ — Disqualified

| Rank | Athlete | Time | Notes |
|---|---|---|---|
| 1st place, gold medalist(s) | Maki Tabata (JPN) | 4:29.58 | |
| 2nd place, silver medalist(s) | Baek Eun-bi (KOR) | 4:31.41 | |
| 3rd place, bronze medalist(s) | Eriko Ishino (JPN) | 4:34.13 | |
| 4 | Wang Fei (CHN) | 4:36.73 | |
| 5 | Choi Yun-suk (KOR) | 4:38.95 | |
| 6 | Anzhelika Gavrilova (KAZ) | 4:40.39 | |
| 7 | Nam Dal-ri (KOR) | 4:43.32 | |
| 8 | Marina Pupina (KAZ) | 5:03.41 | |
| 9 | Nami Nemoto (JPN) | 5:36.45 | |
| — | Gao Yang (CHN) | DSQ | |
