= Alpine skiing at the 2003 Asian Winter Games – Women's giant slalom =

Women's giant slalom at the 2003 Asian Winter Games
- Venue: Owani Onsen Ski Area
- Dates: 5 February 2003
- Competitors: 18 from 6 nations

Medalists
gold medal	Reina Umehara	Japan
silver medal	Hiromi Yumoto	Japan
bronze medal	Noriko Fukushima	Japan

The women's giant slalom at the 2003 Asian Winter Games was held on 5 February 2003 at Owani Onsen Ski Area, Japan.

== Schedule ==
All times are Japan Standard Time (UTC+09:00)

Date	Time	Event
Wednesday, 5 February 2003	10:00	1st run
Wednesday, 5 February 2003	13:00	2nd run

== Results ==
Legend

- DNF — Did not finish

Rank	Athlete	1st run	2nd run	Total
1st place, gold medalist(s)	Reina Umehara (JPN)	56.51	56.66	1:53.17
2nd place, silver medalist(s)	Hiromi Yumoto (JPN)	57.85	57.48	1:55.33
3rd place, bronze medalist(s)	Noriko Fukushima (JPN)	57.78	57.64	1:55.42
4	Chika Takeda (JPN)	58.50	57.13	1:55.63
5	Oh Jae-eun (KOR)	58.77	57.99	1:56.76
6	Yoo Hye-min (KOR)	1:00.07	58.77	1:58.84
7	Erin Min (KOR)	1:01.21	58.24	1:59.45
8	Olesya Persidskaya (KAZ)	1:01.83	59.98	2:01.81
9	Dong Jinzhi (CHN)	1:01.10	1:01.15	2:02.25
10	Kang Bo-seong (KOR)	1:02.06	1:00.27	2:02.33
11	Song Yang (CHN)	1:03.07	59.33	2:02.60
12	Lyudmila Fedotova (KAZ)	1:03.26	1:01.79	2:05.05
13	Nisrine Njeim (LIB)	1:03.21	1:02.45	2:05.66
14	Souraya Frem (LIB)	1:04.75	1:04.06	2:08.81
15	Wen Xuexin (CHN)	1:04.40	1:04.48	2:08.88
16	Miao Liyan (CHN)	1:09.80	1:00.49	2:10.29
17	Neha Ahuja (IND)	1:06.96	1:05.40	2:12.36
—	Vera Yeremenko (KAZ)	DNF		DNF
