= Speed skating at the 2003 Asian Winter Games – Women's 1500 metres =

Women's 1500 metres at the 2003 Asian Winter Games
- Venue: Nagane Park Speed Skating Rink
- Dates: 3 February 2003
- Competitors: 14 from 5 nations

Medalists
gold medal	Maki Tabata	Japan
silver medal	Aki Tonoike	Japan
bronze medal	Baek Eun-bi	South Korea

The women's 1500 metres at the 2003 Asian Winter Games was held on 3 February 2003 in Hachinohe, Aomori Prefecture, Japan.

== Schedule ==
All times are Japan Standard Time (UTC+09:00)

Date	Time	Event
Monday, 3 February 2003	11:40	Final

== Records ==
Prior to this competition, the existing world and Games records were as follows.

World Record	Anni Friesinger (GER)	1:54.02	Salt Lake City, United States	20 February 2002
Games Record	Lyudmila Prokasheva (KAZ)	2:08.50	Harbin, China	7 February 1996

== Results ==
Rank	Pair	Athlete	Time	Notes
1st place, gold medalist(s)	4	Maki Tabata (JPN)	2:05.66	GR
2nd place, silver medalist(s)	7	Aki Tonoike (JPN)	2:08.79	
3rd place, bronze medalist(s)	7	Baek Eun-bi (KOR)	2:09.61	
4	6	Wang Fei (CHN)	2:10.37	
5	5	Choi Yun-suk (KOR)	2:10.65	
6	4	Gao Yang (CHN)	2:10.75	
7	5	Yuri Obara (JPN)	2:10.95	
8	1	Anzhelika Gavrilova (KAZ)	2:11.04	
9	2	Yoon Hee-joon (KOR)	2:11.76	
10	3	Song Li (CHN)	2:12.42	
11	3	Lee So-yeon (KOR)	2:13.93	
12	6	Marina Pupina (KAZ)	2:22.60	
13	2	Düürengiin Natsagnyam (MGL)	2:43.12	
14	1	Narangereliin Odtsetseg (MGL)	2:52.32	
