= Speed skating at the 2003 Asian Winter Games – Men's 1000 metres =

Men's 1000 metres at the 2003 Asian Winter Games
- Venue: Nagane Park Speed Skating Rink
- Dates: 5 February 2003
- Competitors: 16 from 5 nations

Medalists
gold medal	Lee Kyou-hyuk	South Korea
silver medal	Hiroyasu Shimizu	Japan
bronze medal	Takaharu Nakajima	Japan

The men's 1000 metres at the 2003 Asian Winter Games was held on 5 February 2003 in Hachinohe, Aomori Prefecture, Japan.

== Schedule ==
All times are Japan Standard Time (UTC+09:00)

Date	Time	Event
Wednesday, 5 February 2003	10:30	Final

== Records ==
Prior to this competition, the existing world and Games records were as follows.

World Record	Gerard van Velde (NED)	1:07.18	Salt Lake City, United States	16 February 2002
Games Record	Yusuke Imai (JPN)	1:14.27	Harbin, China	8 February 1996

== Results ==
Rank	Pair	Athlete	Time	Notes
1st place, gold medalist(s)	7	Lee Kyou-hyuk (KOR)	1:13.96	GR
2nd place, silver medalist(s)	6	Hiroyasu Shimizu (JPN)	1:14.01	
3rd place, bronze medalist(s)	5	Takaharu Nakajima (JPN)	1:14.05	
4	5	Choi Jae-bong (KOR)	1:14.06	
5	8	Yusuke Imai (JPN)	1:14.15	
6	3	Sergey Tsybenko (KAZ)	1:14.98	
7	4	Mun Jun (KOR)	1:15.10	
8	1	Nikolay Ulyanin (KAZ)	1:15.16	
9	2	Li Yu (CHN)	1:15.59	
10	4	Zhang Zhongqi (CHN)	1:15.67	
11	7	Tadashi Obara (JPN)	1:15.74	
12	8	Park Jae-man (KOR)	1:16.31	
13	1	Lu Zhuo (CHN)	1:16.40	
14	6	Yu Fengtong (CHN)	1:17.18	
15	2	Rentsendorjiin Baasandorj (MGL)	1:21.89	
16	3	Shuragiin Enkhbat (MGL)	1:36.73	
