= Alpine skiing at the 2003 Asian Winter Games – Men's slalom =

Men's slalom at the 2003 Asian Winter Games
- Venue: Owani Onsen Ski Area
- Dates: 2 February 2003
- Competitors: 34 from 12 nations

Medalists
gold medal	Kiminobu Kimura	Japan
silver medal	Niki Fürstauer	Lebanon
bronze medal	Tetsuya Otaki	Japan

The men's slalom at the 2003 Asian Winter Games was held on 2 February 2003 at the Owani Onsen Ski Area in Japan.

== Schedule ==
All times are Japan Standard Time (UTC+09:00)

Date	Time	Event
Sunday, 2 February 2003	10:00	1st run
Sunday, 2 February 2003	12:30	2nd run

== Results ==
Legend

- DNF — Did not finish
- DNS — Did not start
- DSQ — Disqualified

Rank	Athlete	1st run	2nd run	Total
1st place, gold medalist(s)	Kiminobu Kimura (JPN)	52.49	51.26	1:43.75
2nd place, silver medalist(s)	Niki Fürstauer (LIB)	52.17	51.62	1:43.79
3rd place, bronze medalist(s)	Tetsuya Otaki (JPN)	53.27	52.25	1:45.52
4	Shohei Yokota (JPN)	53.61	52.19	1:45.80
5	Ji Young-ha (KOR)	53.79	52.20	1:45.99
6	Viktor Ryabchenko (KAZ)	54.15	52.20	1:46.35
7	Byun Jong-moon (KOR)	54.04	52.49	1:46.53
8	Hur Seung-wook (KOR)	54.44	52.22	1:46.66
9	Kang Min-heuk (KOR)	53.87	52.95	1:46.82
10	Andrei Drygin (TJK)	57.41	54.34	1:51.75
11	Alidad Saveh-Shemshaki (IRI)	58.37	55.68	1:54.05
12	Bagher Kalhor (IRI)	58.31	56.57	1:54.88
13	Ren Ligang (CHN)	58.72	56.40	1:55.12
14	Farshad Tir (IRI)	59.61	56.67	1:56.28
15	Hossein Kalhor (IRI)	59.96	57.89	1:57.85
16	Zhang Qingliang (CHN)	1:00.20	58.59	1:58.79
17	Liu Changfu (CHN)	1:00.06	59.34	1:59.40
18	Jamil Mehanna (LIB)	1:00.53	1:00.33	2:00.86
19	Muhammad Iqbal Shah (PAK)	1:08.37	1:05.58	2:13.95
20	Muhammad Abbas (PAK)	1:08.59	1:06.39	2:14.98
21	Nanak Chand Thakur (IND)	1:10.01	1:08.12	2:18.13
22	Abdul Baqi (PAK)	1:13.04	1:09.80	2:22.84
23	Chuni Lal Thakur (IND)	1:13.86	1:09.66	2:23.52
24	Waseem Abbas (PAK)	1:15.45	1:11.53	2:26.98
25	Pramod Lama (NEP)	1:38.55	1:38.56	3:17.11
—	Yusuke Kaji (JPN)		DNF	DNF
—	Kaisar Kayrouz (LIB)		DNF	DNF
—	Kayrat Ermetov (UZB)		DNF	DNF
—	George Salameh (LIB)		DSQ	DSQ
—	Sun Maoxin (CHN)	DNF		DNF
—	Karomadin Akhioev (TJK)	DNF		DNF
—	Ruslan Issayev (KAZ)	DSQ		DSQ
—	Chagnaagiin Aranzalzul (MGL)	DNS		DNS
—	Mustafa Bashir (PLE)	DNS		DNS
