= Speed skating at the 2003 Asian Winter Games – Women's 1000 metres =

Women's 1000 metres at the 2003 Asian Winter Games
- Venue: Nagane Park Speed Skating Rink
- Dates: 5 February 2003
- Competitors: 16 from 5 nations

Medalists
gold medal	Aki Tonoike	Japan
silver medal	Wang Manli	China
bronze medal	Shihomi Shinya	Japan

The women's 1000 metres at the 2003 Asian Winter Games was held on 5 February 2003 in Hachinohe, Aomori Prefecture, Japan.

== Schedule ==
All times are Japan Standard Time (UTC+09:00)

Date	Time	Event
Wednesday, 5 February 2003	10:00	Final

== Records ==
Prior to this competition, the existing world and Games records were as follows.

World Record	Chris Witty (USA)	1:13.83	Salt Lake City, United States	17 February 2002
Games Record	Chun Hee-joo (KOR)	1:23.30	Harbin, China	8 February 1996

== Results ==
Rank	Pair	Athlete	Time	Notes
1st place, gold medalist(s)	5	Aki Tonoike (JPN)	1:21.01	GR
2nd place, silver medalist(s)	6	Wang Manli (CHN)	1:21.49	
3rd place, bronze medalist(s)	7	Shihomi Shinya (JPN)	1:21.66	
4	5	Zhao Xin (CHN)	1:22.32	
5	6	Tomomi Shimizu (JPN)	1:23.02	
6	8	Sayuri Osuga (JPN)	1:23.10	
7	3	Anzhelika Gavrilova (KAZ)	1:23.20	
8	4	Xing Aihua (CHN)	1:23.99	
9	8	Choi Seung-yong (KOR)	1:24.20	
10	2	Lee Yong-ju (KOR)	1:24.23	
11	1	Sai Na (CHN)	1:24.53	
12	3	Yoon Hee-joon (KOR)	1:24.88	
13	7	Cho Seon-yeon (KOR)	1:26.07	
14	4	Marina Pupina (KAZ)	1:32.41	
15	2	Düürengiin Natsagnyam (MGL)	1:44.44	
16	1	Narangereliin Odtsetseg (MGL)	1:49.31	
