= Alpine skiing at the 2003 Asian Winter Games – Men's giant slalom =

Men's giant slalom at the 2003 Asian Winter Games
- Venue: Owani Onsen Ski Area
- Dates: 7 February 2003
- Competitors: 34 from 12 nations

Medalists
gold medal	Niki Fürstauer	Lebanon
silver medal	Tetsuya Otaki	Japan
bronze medal	Masami Kudo	Japan

The men's giant slalom at the 2003 Asian Winter Games was held on 7 February 2003 at Owani Onsen Ski Area, Japan.

== Schedule ==
All times are Japan Standard Time (UTC+09:00)

Date	Time	Event
Friday, 7 February 2003	10:00	1st run
Friday, 7 February 2003	13:00	2nd run

== Results ==
Legend

- DNF — Did not finish
- DNS — Did not start
- DSQ — Disqualified

Rank	Athlete	1st run	2nd run	Total
1st place, gold medalist(s)	Niki Fürstauer (LIB)	1:05.69	1:02.50	2:08.19
2nd place, silver medalist(s)	Tetsuya Otaki (JPN)	1:06.04	1:02.92	2:08.96
3rd place, bronze medalist(s)	Masami Kudo (JPN)	1:06.30	1:02.68	2:08.98
4	Yusuke Kaji (JPN)	1:06.19	1:02.81	2:09.00
5	Byun Jong-moon (KOR)	1:07.09	1:02.54	2:09.63
6	Ji Young-ha (KOR)	1:06.75	1:02.94	2:09.69
7	Hur Seung-wook (KOR)	1:07.68	1:03.95	2:11.63
8	Shohei Yokota (JPN)	1:07.71	1:04.06	2:11.77
9	Ren Ligang (CHN)	1:10.43	1:06.63	2:17.06
10	Alidad Saveh-Shemshaki (IRI)	1:10.81	1:06.77	2:17.58
11	Bagher Kalhor (IRI)	1:09.68	1:07.96	2:17.64
12	Hossein Kalhor (IRI)	1:11.77	1:06.56	2:18.33
13	Zhang Qingliang (CHN)	1:11.72	1:08.26	2:19.98
14	Sun Maoxin (CHN)	1:12.59	1:08.96	2:21.55
15	Kayrat Ermetov (UZB)	1:13.28	1:09.53	2:22.81
16	Jamil Mehanna (LIB)	1:13.65	1:09.58	2:23.23
17	Liu Changfu (CHN)	1:10.36	1:14.01	2:24.37
18	Nanak Chand Thakur (IND)	1:18.70	1:13.46	2:32.16
19	Chuni Lal Thakur (IND)	1:20.18	1:13.58	2:33.76
20	Muhammad Abbas (PAK)	1:18.96	1:14.94	2:33.90
21	Muhammad Iqbal Shah (PAK)	1:19.91	1:15.43	2:35.34
22	Jayaram Khadka (NEP)	1:22.04	1:20.87	2:42.91
23	Karomadin Akhioev (TJK)	1:26.17	1:19.82	2:45.99
24	Sher Afzal (PAK)	2:54.56	1:20.29	4:14.85
—	Kang Min-heuk (KOR)		DNF	DNF
—	Farshad Tir (IRI)		DNF	DNF
—	Andrei Drygin (TJK)		DNF	DNF
—	Ruslan Issayev (KAZ)		DNF	DNF
—	Viktor Ryabchenko (KAZ)		DSQ	DSQ
—	Kaisar Kayrouz (LIB)		DSQ	DSQ
—	Pramod Lama (NEP)		DSQ	DSQ
—	Sawar Khan (PAK)	DNF		DNF
—	Shamsoullo Zokirov (TJK)	DNS		DNS
—	Chagnaagiin Aranzalzul (MGL)	DNS		DNS
