= Speed skating at the 2003 Asian Winter Games – Men's 10000 metres =

Men's 10000 metres at the 2003 Asian Winter Games
- Venue: Nagane Park Speed Skating Rink
- Dates: 5 February 2003
- Competitors: 12 from 4 nations

Medalists
| gold medal | Hiroki Hirako | Japan |
| silver medal | Kesato Miyazaki | Japan |
| bronze medal | Naoki Yasuda | Japan |

The men's 10000 metres at the 2003 Asian Winter Games was held on 5 February 2003 in Hachinohe, Aomori Prefecture, Japan.

== Schedule ==
All times are Japan Standard Time (UTC+09:00)

| Date | Time | Event |
|---|---|---|
| Wednesday, 5 February 2003 | 13:00 | Final |

== Records ==
Prior to this competition, the existing world and Games records were as follows.

| World Record | Jochem Uytdehaage (NED) | 12:58.92 | Salt Lake City, United States | 22 February 2002 |
| Games Record | Shigekazu Nemoto (JPN) | 14:34.72 | Harbin, China | 9 February 1996 |

== Results ==
Legend

- DSQ — Disqualified

| Rank | Athlete | Time | Notes |
|---|---|---|---|
| 1st place, gold medalist(s) | Hiroki Hirako (JPN) | 14:45.49 | |
| 2nd place, silver medalist(s) | Kesato Miyazaki (JPN) | 14:47.16 | |
| 3rd place, bronze medalist(s) | Naoki Yasuda (JPN) | 14:50.43 | |
| 4 | Radik Bikchentayev (KAZ) | 14:50.50 | |
| 5 | Sergey Ilyushchenko (KAZ) | 14:51.93 | |
| 6 | Yeo Sang-yeop (KOR) | 14:53.18 | |
| 7 | Choi Keun-weon (KOR) | 15:03.46 | |
| 8 | Gao Xuefeng (CHN) | 15:12.72 | |
| 9 | Zheng Jinze (CHN) | 15:25.14 | |
| 10 | Vladimir Kostin (KAZ) | 15:30.39 | |
| 11 | Liu Tongyang (CHN) | 15:56.16 | |
| — | Lee Seung-hwan (KOR) | DSQ | |
