= Figure skating at the 2003 Asian Winter Games – Ice dance =

Ice dance at the 2003 Asian Winter Games
- Venue: Aomori Prefectural Skating Rink
- Dates: 2–4 February 2003
- Competitors: 12 from 4 nations

Medalists
gold medal	Cao Xianming; Zhang Weina	China
silver medal	Akiyuki Kido; Nozomi Watanabe	Japan
bronze medal	Kenji Miyamoto; Rie Arikawa	Japan

The mixed ice dancing figure skating at the 2003 Asian Winter Games was held on 2, 3 and 4 February 2003 at Aomori Prefectural Skating Rink, Japan.

== Schedule ==
All times are Japan Standard Time (UTC+09:00)

Date	Time	Event
Sunday, 2 February 2003	18:00	Compulsory dance
Monday, 3 February 2003	15:00	Original dance
Tuesday, 4 February 2003	15:00	Free dance

== Results ==
Rank	Team	CD	OD	FD	Total
1st place, gold medalist(s)	China (CHN); Cao Xianming; Zhang Weina	1	1	1	2.0
2nd place, silver medalist(s)	Japan (JPN); Akiyuki Kido; Nozomi Watanabe	1	2	2	3.6
3rd place, bronze medalist(s)	Japan (JPN); Kenji Miyamoto; Rie Arikawa	3	3	3	6.0
4	China (CHN); Gao Chongbo; Yang Fang	5	4	4	8.4
5	North Korea (PRK); Kim Yong-ho; Ryu Sun-ae	4	5	5	9.6
6	South Korea (KOR); Kim Min-woo; Kim Hye-min	6	6	6	12.0
