= Speed skating at the 2003 Asian Winter Games – Men's 1500 metres =

Men's 1500 metres at the 2003 Asian Winter Games
- Venue: Nagane Park Speed Skating Rink
- Dates: 3 February 2003
- Competitors: 17 from 5 nations

Medalists
gold medal	Lee Kyou-hyuk	South Korea
silver medal	Mun Jun	South Korea
bronze medal	Yeo Sang-yeop	South Korea

The men's 1500 metres at the 2003 Asian Winter Games was held on 3 February 2003 in Hachinohe, Aomori Prefecture, Japan.

== Schedule ==
All times are Japan Standard Time (UTC+09:00)

Date	Time	Event
Monday, 3 February 2003	12:30	Final

== Records ==
Prior to this competition, the existing world and Games records were as follows.

World Record	Derek Parra (USA)	1:43.95	Salt Lake City, United States	19 February 2002
Games Record	Choi Jae-bong (KOR)	1:56.11	Chuncheon, South Korea	4 February 1999

== Results ==
Rank	Pair	Athlete	Time	Notes
1st place, gold medalist(s)	4	Lee Kyou-hyuk (KOR)	1:54.65	GR
2nd place, silver medalist(s)	6	Mun Jun (KOR)	1:54.89	
3rd place, bronze medalist(s)	3	Yeo Sang-yeop (KOR)	1:55.69	
4	5	Choi Jae-bong (KOR)	1:56.22	
5	2	Yusuke Imai (JPN)	1:56.53	
6	8	Radik Bikchentayev (KAZ)	1:57.40	
7	9	Takahiro Nozaki (JPN)	1:57.51	
8	9	Sergey Tsybenko (KAZ)	1:57.79	
9	3	Gao Xuefeng (CHN)	1:58.32	
10	8	Takaharu Nakajima (JPN)	1:58.39	
11	7	Vladimir Kostin (KAZ)	1:58.91	
12	6	Nikolay Ulyanin (KAZ)	1:59.28	
13	7	Naoki Yasuda (JPN)	2:01.33	
14	4	Zheng Jinze (CHN)	2:01.51	
15	2	Liu Tongyang (CHN)	2:02.38	
16	5	Rentsendorjiin Baasandorj (MGL)	2:10.64	
17	1	Shuragiin Enkhbat (MGL)	2:41.85	
