= Speed skating at the 2003 Asian Winter Games – Men's 5000 metres =

Men's 5000 metres at the 2003 Asian Winter Games
- Venue: Nagane Park Speed Skating Rink
- Dates: 2 February 2003
- Competitors: 12 from 4 nations

Medalists
gold medal	Takahiro Nozaki	Japan
silver medal	Radik Bikchentayev	Kazakhstan
bronze medal	Kesato Miyazaki	Japan

The men's 5000 metres at the 2003 Asian Winter Games was held on 2 February 2003 in Hachinohe, Aomori Prefecture, Japan.

== Schedule ==
All times are Japan Standard Time (UTC+09:00)

Date	Time	Event
Sunday, 2 February 2003	11:15	Final

== Records ==
Prior to this competition, the existing world and Games records were as follows.

World Record	Jochem Uytdehaage (NED)	6:14.66	Salt Lake City, United States	9 February 2002
Games Record	Mitsuru Watanabe (JPN)	7:03.99	Harbin, China	5 February 1996

== Results ==
Rank	Pair	Athlete	Time	Notes
1st place, gold medalist(s)	5	Takahiro Nozaki (JPN)	7:06.11	
2nd place, silver medalist(s)	5	Radik Bikchentayev (KAZ)	7:06.46	
3rd place, bronze medalist(s)	4	Kesato Miyazaki (JPN)	7:12.45	
4	3	Hiroki Hirako (JPN)	7:13.30	
5	4	Lee Seung-hwan (KOR)	7:14.91	
6	3	Sergey Ilyushchenko (KAZ)	7:15.64	
7	6	Mun Jun (KOR)	7:15.77	
8	6	Vladimir Kostin (KAZ)	7:18.66	
9	2	Gao Xuefeng (CHN)	7:23.18	
10	2	Zheng Jinze (CHN)	7:26.93	
11	1	Yu Won-chul (KOR)	7:34.82	
12	1	Liu Tongyang (CHN)	7:42.84	
