= Ski jumping at the 2003 Asian Winter Games – Men's normal hill team =

Game

Men's normal hill team at the 2003 Asian Winter Games
- Venue: Takinosawa Ski Jumping Hill
- Dates: 6 February 2003
- Competitors: 12 from 3 nations

Medalists
gold medal	South Korea; Kim Hyun-ki, Choi Heung-chul, Choi Yong-jik, Kang Chil-ku
silver medal	Japan; Akira Higashi, Yuta Watase, Yasuhiro Shibata, Kazuyoshi Funaki
bronze medal	Kazakhstan; Radik Zhaparov, Pavel Gaiduk, Maxim Polunin, Stanislav Filimonov

The men's normal hill K90 team competition at the 2003 Asian Winter Games in Aomori, Japan was held on 6 February at the Takinosawa Ski Jumping Hill.

== Schedule ==
All times are Japan Standard Time (UTC+09:00)

Date	Time	Event
Thursday, 6 February 2003	11:40	Final

== Results ==
Rank	Team	1st round		Final round		Total
Rank	Team	Distance	Score	Distance	Score	Total
1st place, gold medalist(s)	South Korea (KOR)		472.5		479.5	952.0
	Kim Hyun-ki	90.0	117.0	97.0	132.5	
	Choi Heung-chul	92.0	121.0	93.5	124.5	
	Choi Yong-jik	88.0	111.0	87.5	111.0	
	Kang Chil-ku	93.5	123.5	88.0	111.5	
2nd place, silver medalist(s)	Japan (JPN)		448.0		475.0	923.0
	Akira Higashi	91.0	117.5	94.0	126.5	
	Yuta Watase	80.0	94.0	90.0	116.0	
	Yasuhiro Shibata	88.5	113.0	82.5	99.0	
	Kazuyoshi Funaki	92.5	123.5	98.0	133.5	
3rd place, bronze medalist(s)	Kazakhstan (KAZ)		421.0		432.5	853.5
	Radik Zhaparov	83.0	97.5	88.0	111.5	
	Pavel Gaiduk	79.5	90.5	84.5	103.0	
	Maxim Polunin	87.5	110.5	87.5	111.0	
	Stanislav Filimonov	92.5	122.5	86.5	107.0	
