= Ski jumping at the 2003 Asian Winter Games – Men's normal hill individual =

Men's normal hill individual at the 2003 Asian Winter Games
- Venue: Takinosawa Ski Jumping Hill
- Dates: 4 February 2003
- Competitors: 13 from 4 nations

Medalists
gold medal	Kazuyoshi Funaki	Japan
silver medal	Akira Higashi	Japan
bronze medal	Choi Heung-chul	South Korea

The men's normal hill K90 individual competition at the 2003 Asian Winter Games in Aomori, Japan was held on 4 February at the Takinosawa Ski Jumping Hill.

== Schedule ==
All times are Japan Standard Time (UTC+09:00)

Date	Time	Event
Tuesday, 4 February 2003	11:40	Final

== Results ==
Legend

- DNS — Did not start

Rank	Athlete	1st round		Final round		Total
Rank	Athlete	Distance	Score	Distance	Score	Total
1st place, gold medalist(s)	Kazuyoshi Funaki (JPN)	95.0	128.5	89.5	116.5	245.0
2nd place, silver medalist(s)	Akira Higashi (JPN)	90.5	118.0	87.5	110.0	228.0
3rd place, bronze medalist(s)	Choi Heung-chul (KOR)	91.5	119.0	82.5	99.0	218.0
4	Stanislav Filimonov (KAZ)	84.5	103.0	88.5	109.0	212.0
5	Maxim Polunin (KAZ)	88.0	110.5	83.5	101.0	211.5
6	Kim Hyun-ki (KOR)	88.0	111.0	82.5	99.0	210.0
7	Yasuhiro Shibata (JPN)	84.0	102.0	84.0	102.0	204.0
8	Choi Yong-jik (KOR)	87.0	108.5	78.0	87.0	195.5
9	Kang Chil-ku (KOR)	87.5	109.0	79.0	86.0	195.0
10	Dmitriy Chvykov (KGZ)	78.5	89.5	85.0	104.0	193.5
11	Pavel Gaiduk (KAZ)	79.0	89.0	81.0	94.0	183.0
12	Radik Zhaparov (KAZ)	74.0	74.5	76.0	83.0	157.5
—	Masahiko Harada (JPN)					DNS
