= Iran at the 2003 Asian Winter Games =

- IOC code: IRI
- NOC: National Olympic Committee of the Islamic Republic of Iran

in Aomori
- Competitors: 12 in 1 sport
- Medals: Gold 0 Silver 0 Bronze 0 Total 0

Asian Winter Games appearances
- 1990; 1996; 1999; 2003; 2007; 2011; 2017; 2025; 2029

Iran participated in the 2003 Asian Winter Games held in Aomori, Japan from January 1, 2003 to February 8, 2003.

== Competitors ==
Sport	Men	Women	Total
Alpine skiing	4		4
Cross-country skiing	4		4
Snowboarding	4		4
Total	12	0	12

== Results by event ==
=== Skiing ===
==== Alpine ====
Athlete	Event	Run 1	Run 2	Total	Rank
Bagher Kalhor	Men's slalom	58.31	56.57	1:54.88	12
Hossein Kalhor	Men's slalom	59.96	57.89	1:57.85	15
Alidad Saveh-Shemshaki	Men's slalom	58.37	55.68	1:54.05	11
Farshad Tir	Men's slalom	59.61	56.67	1:56.28	14
Bagher Kalhor	Men's giant slalom	1:09.68	1:07.96	2:17.64	11
Hossein Kalhor	Men's giant slalom	1:11.77	1:06.56	2:18.33	12
Alidad Saveh-Shemshaki	Men's giant slalom	1:10.81	1:06.77	2:17.58	10
Farshad Tir	Men's giant slalom		DNF	—	—

==== Cross-country ====
Athlete	Event	Time	Rank
Mojtaba Mirhashemi	Men's 10 km classical	37:07.1	22
Mostafa Mirhashemi	Men's 10 km classical	34:23.6	17
Mohammad Taghi Shemshaki	Men's 10 km classical	35:45.6	19
Meisam Sologhani	Men's 10 km classical	36:11.9	21
Mojtaba Mirhashemi	Men's 15 km freestyle	46:16.0	16
Mostafa Mirhashemi	Men's 15 km freestyle	43:41.4	14
Mohammad Taghi Shemshaki	Men's 15 km freestyle	43:50.5	15
Meisam Sologhani	Men's 15 km freestyle	46:57.2	17
Mojtaba Mirhashemi	Men's 30 km freestyle	1:41:49.4	12
Mostafa Mirhashemi	Men's 30 km freestyle	1:42:24.6	13
Mohammad Taghi Shemshaki	Men's 30 km freestyle	1:36:38.5	11
Meisam Sologhani	Men's 30 km freestyle	Did not start	—
Mohammad Taghi Shemshaki; Meisam Sologhani; Mojtaba Mirhashemi; Mostafa Mirhashemi	Men's 4 × 10 km relay	2:06:09.2	5

==== Snowboarding ====
Athlete	Event	Run 1		Run 2		Total	
Athlete	Event	Time	Rank	Time	Rank	Time	Rank
Hossein Kalhor	Men's slalom	54.86	6	52.38	6	1:47.24	7
Hossein Seid	Men's slalom	55.04	7	52.68	8	1:47.72	8
Morteza Seid	Men's slalom	56.84	10	55.94	11	1:52.78	11
Hossein Kalhor	Men's giant slalom	1:13.95	8	1:16.83	8	2:30.78	8
Hossein Seid	Men's giant slalom	1:14.72	9	1:17.04	9	2:31.76	9
Morteza Seid	Men's giant slalom	1:17.06	12	1:17.12	10	2:34.18	11
Mosayyeb Seid	Men's giant slalom	1:15.24	11	1:18.23	11	2:33.47	10
