= Freestyle skiing at the 2003 Asian Winter Games =

- Venue: Ajigasawa Ski Area
- Dates: 6 February 2003
- Competitors: 13 from 3 nations

Freestyle skiing at the 2003 Asian Winter Games took place in the Ajigasawa Ski Area located in the town of Ajigasawa, Aomori Prefecture, Japan with two events contested — one each for men and women. This was the second time that freestyle skiing events were included in the official Winter Asiad program; the first time was in the 1999 Harbin Winter Asiad which included only aerial events.

== Schedule ==
Q	Qualification	F	Final

Event↓/Date →	6th Thu	
Men's moguls	Q	F
Women's moguls	Q	F

== Medalists ==
Event	Gold	Silver	Bronze
Men's moguls	Yu Masukawa; Japan	Kenro Shimoyama; Japan	Ivan Sidorov; Kazakhstan
Women's moguls	Aiko Uemura; Japan	Irina Kormysheva; Kazakhstan	Yumi Kubota; Japan

== Medal table ==
Rank	Nation	Gold	Silver	Bronze	Total
1	Japan (JPN)	2	1	1	4
2	Kazakhstan (KAZ)	0	1	1	2
Totals (2 entries)		2	2	2	6

== Participating nations ==
A total of 13 athletes from 3 nations competed in freestyle skiing at the 2003 Asian Winter Games:

- Japan (8)
- Kazakhstan (4)
- Mongolia (1)
