= Daisuke Murakami =

Daisuke Murakami may refer to:

- Daisuke Murakami (figure skater) (born 1991)
- Daisuke Murakami (snowboarder) (born 1983)
