= Figure skating at the 2003 Asian Winter Games – Women's singles =

Women's singles at the 2003 Asian Winter Games
- Venue: Aomori Prefectural Skating Rink
- Dates: 3–4 February 2003
- Competitors: 15 from 7 nations

Medalists
gold medal	Shizuka Arakawa	Japan
silver medal	Fumie Suguri	Japan
bronze medal	Yukari Nakano	Japan

The women's singles figure skating at the 2003 Asian Winter Games was held on 3 and 4 February 2003 at Aomori Prefectural Skating Rink, Japan.

== Schedule ==
All times are Japan Standard Time (UTC+09:00)

Date	Time	Event
Monday, 3 February 2003	16:30	Short program
Tuesday, 4 February 2003	18:30	Free skating

== Results ==
Rank	Athlete	SP	FS	Total
1st place, gold medalist(s)	Shizuka Arakawa (JPN)	1	1	1.5
2nd place, silver medalist(s)	Fumie Suguri (JPN)	2	2	3.0
3rd place, bronze medalist(s)	Yukari Nakano (JPN)	3	3	4.5
4	Kim Yong-suk (PRK)	4	4	6.0
5	Fang Dan (CHN)	5	5	7.5
6	Anastasia Gimazetdinova (UZB)	7	6	9.5
7	Sun Siyin (CHN)	6	7	10.0
8	Cho Hae-lyeum (KOR)	8	8	12.0
9	Lee Sun-bin (KOR)	11	9	14.5
10	Shin Yea-ji (KOR)	10	10	15.0
11	Hou Na (CHN)	9	11	15.5
12	Jennifer Lee (TPE)	12	12	18.0
13	Anchalee Voogd (THA)	13	13	19.5
14	Amy Alisara Arirachakaran (THA)	14	14	21.0
15	Chancharas Suriyothai (THA)	15	15	22.5
