= Speed skating at the 2003 Asian Winter Games – Men's 500 metres =

Men's 500 metres

Men's 500 metres at the 2003 Asian Winter Games
- Venue: Nagane Park Speed Skating Rink
- Dates: 2–3 February 2003
- Competitors: 14 from 4 nations

Medalists
gold medal	Hiroyasu Shimizu	Japan
silver medal	Tomonori Kawata	Japan
bronze medal	Joji Kato	Japan

The men's 500 metres at the 2003 Asian Winter Games was held on 2 and 3 February 2003 in Hachinohe, Aomori Prefecture, Japan.

== Schedule ==
All times are Japan Standard Time (UTC+09:00)

Date	Time	Event
Sunday, 2 February 2003	13:37	Race 1
Monday, 3 February 2003	10:30	Race 2

== Records ==
=== 500 meters ===
Prior to this competition, the existing world and Games records were as follows.

World Record	Hiroyasu Shimizu (JPN)	34.32	Salt Lake City, United States	10 March 2001
Games Record	Takahiro Hamamichi (JPN)	36.69	Harbin, China	5 February 1996

=== 500 meters × 2 ===
Prior to this competition, the existing world and Games records were as follows.

World Record	Hiroyasu Shimizu (JPN)	1:08.96	Salt Lake City, United States	10 March 2001
Games Record	Jaegal Sung-yeol (KOR); Takahiro Hamamichi (JPN)	1:13.57	Harbin, China	6 February 1996

== Results ==
Rank	Athlete	Race 1		Race 2		Total	Notes
Rank	Athlete	Pair	Time	Pair	Time	Total	Notes
1st place, gold medalist(s)	Hiroyasu Shimizu (JPN)	4	35.56 GR	7	35.81	1:11.37	GR
2nd place, silver medalist(s)	Tomonori Kawata (JPN)	5	36.20	7	36.27	1:12.47	
3rd place, bronze medalist(s)	Joji Kato (JPN)	6	36.40	6	36.32	1:12.72	
4	Lee Kyou-hyuk (KOR)	7	36.66	5	36.38	1:13.04	
5	Choi Jae-bong (KOR)	6	36.65	6	36.82	1:13.47	
6	Zhang Zhongqi (CHN)	4	36.89	3	36.66	1:13.55	
7	Tadashi Obara (JPN)	7	37.01	4	36.81	1:13.82	
8	Li Yu (CHN)	1	36.86	4	36.98	1:13.84	
9	Yu Fengtong (CHN)	5	36.79	5	37.11	1:13.90	
10	Kim Chul-soo (KOR)	2	37.32	2	37.10	1:14.42	
11	Lu Zhuo (CHN)	3	37.61	1	37.35	1:14.86	
12	Park Jae-man (KOR)	1	37.75	3	37.85	1:15.60	
13	Rentsendorjiin Baasandorj (MGL)	3	42.01	2	42.02	1:24.03	
14	Shuragiin Enkhbat (MGL)	2	49.80	1	46.83	1:36.63	
