= Figure skating at the 2003 Asian Winter Games – Men's singles =

Men's singles at the 2003 Asian Winter Games
- Venue: Aomori Prefectural Skating Rink
- Dates: 2–3 February 2003
- Competitors: 10 from 5 nations

Medalists
gold medal	Takeshi Honda	Japan
silver medal	Li Chengjiang	China
bronze medal	Zhang Min	China

The men's singles figure skating at the 2003 Asian Winter Games was held on 2 and 3 February 2003 at Aomori Prefectural Skating Rink, Japan.

== Schedule ==
All times are Japan Standard Time (UTC+09:00)

Date	Time	Event
Sunday, 2 February 2003	15:00	Short program
Monday, 3 February 2003	19:00	Free skating

== Results ==
Legend

- WD — Withdrawn

Rank	Athlete	SP	FS	Total
1st place, gold medalist(s)	Takeshi Honda (JPN)	1	1	1.5
2nd place, silver medalist(s)	Li Chengjiang (CHN)	2	2	3.0
3rd place, bronze medalist(s)	Zhang Min (CHN)	3	3	4.5
4	Yamato Tamura (JPN)	5	4	6.5
5	Li Yunfei (CHN)	4	5	7.0
6	Daisuke Takahashi (JPN)	6	6	9.0
7	Lee Dong-whun (KOR)	7	7	10.5
8	Lee Kyu-hyun (KOR)	8	8	12.0
9	Ri Song-chol (PRK)	9	9	13.5
—	Ratcharin Supotchalermkwan (THA)			WD
