= Speed skating at the 2003 Asian Winter Games – Women's 500 metres =

Women's 500 metres at the 2003 Asian Winter Games
- Venue: Nagane Park Speed Skating Rink
- Dates: 2–3 February 2003
- Competitors: 14 from 4 nations

Medalists
| gold medal | Wang Manli | China |
| silver medal | Yukari Watanabe | Japan |
| bronze medal | Sayuri Osuga | Japan |

The women's 500 metres at the 2003 Asian Winter Games was held on 2 and 3 February 2003 in Hachinohe, Aomori Prefecture, Japan.

== Schedule ==
All times are Japan Standard Time (UTC+09:00)

| Date | Time | Event |
|---|---|---|
| Sunday, 2 February 2003 | 14:10 | Race 1 |
| Monday, 3 February 2003 | 10:00 | Race 2 |

== Records ==
=== 500 meters ===
Prior to this competition, the existing world and Games records were as follows.

| World Record | Catriona Le May Doan (CAN) | 37.22 | Calgary, Canada | 9 December 2001 |
| Games Record | Xue Ruihong (CHN) | 39.29 | Chuncheon, South Korea | 2 February 1999 |

=== 500 meters × 2 ===
Prior to this competition, the existing world and Games records were as follows.

| World Record | Catriona Le May Doan (CAN) | 1:14.72 | Salt Lake City, United States | 9 March 2001 |
| Games Record | Xue Ruihong (CHN) | 1:20.13 | Chuncheon, South Korea | 3 February 1999 |

== Results ==
| Rank | Athlete | Race 1 | Race 2 | Total | Notes |
|---|---|---|---|---|---|
| 1st place, gold medalist(s) | Wang Manli (CHN) | 39.20 GR | 39.21 | 1:18.41 | GR |
| 2nd place, silver medalist(s) | Yukari Watanabe (JPN) | 39.23 | 39.57 | 1:18.80 | |
| 3rd place, bronze medalist(s) | Sayuri Osuga (JPN) | 39.67 | 39.52 | 1:19.19 | |
| 4 | Shihomi Shinya (JPN) | 39.93 | 39.54 | 1:19.47 | |
| 5 | Tomomi Okazaki (JPN) | 40.29 | 39.94 | 1:20.23 | |
| 6 | Zhao Xin (CHN) | 39.76 | 40.69 | 1:20.45 | |
| 7 | Choi Seung-yong (KOR) | 40.91 | 40.08 | 1:20.99 | |
| 8 | Xing Aihua (CHN) | 41.18 | 40.60 | 1:21.78 | |
| 9 | Wang Beixing (CHN) | 41.02 | 40.80 | 1:21.82 | |
| 10 | Cho Seon-yeon (KOR) | 41.48 | 40.97 | 1:22.45 | |
| 11 | Lee Yong-ju (KOR) | 41.74 | 41.93 | 1:23.67 | |
| 12 | Yoon Hee-joon (KOR) | 42.35 | 42.02 | 1:24.37 | |
| 13 | Düürengiin Natsagnyam (MGL) | 50.31 | 50.76 | 1:41.07 | |
| 14 | Narangereliin Odtsetseg (MGL) | 50.82 | 50.52 | 1:41.34 | |
