= Curling at the 2003 Asian Winter Games – Women's team =

Women's team at the 2003 Asian Winter Games
- Venue: Aomori City Sports Complex
- Dates: 5–7 February 2003
- Competitors: 20 from 4 nations

Medalists
gold medal	Japan; Shinobu Aota, Yukari Okazaki, Eriko Minatoya, Kotomi Ishizaki, Satomi Tsujii
silver medal	South Korea; Kim Mi-yeon, Park Ji-hyun, Shin Mi-sung, Lee Hyun-jung, Park Kyung-mi
bronze medal	China; Zhao Zhenzhen, Liu Yin, Zhan Jing, Yue Qingshuang, Wang Bingyu

The women's curling at the 2003 Asian Winter Games was held from February 5 to February 7, 2003 at Aomori City Sports Complex, Japan.

This was the first Winter Asiad that included the sport in the official program. Japan won the gold medal after beating South Korea in the final. Japan also finished the preliminary round undefeated.

== Squads ==
China	Chinese Taipei	Japan	South Korea
Zhao Zhenzhen; Liu Yin; Zhan Jing; Yue Qingshuang; Wang Bingyu	Cheng Li-lin; Lu Chia-hui; Chen Hsiao-ching; Chang Chia-wen; Ku Chia-hua	Shinobu Aota; Yukari Okazaki; Eriko Minatoya; Kotomi Ishizaki; Satomi Tsujii	Kim Mi-yeon; Park Ji-hyun; Shin Mi-sung; Lee Hyun-jung; Park Kyung-mi

== Results ==
All times are Japan Standard Time (UTC+09:00)

=== Preliminary ===
Pos	Team	Skip	Pld	W	L	W–L	PF	PA	Qualification
1	Japan	Shinobu Aota	3	3	0	—	30	10	Final
2	South Korea	Kim Mi-yeon	3	2	1	—	25	13	Semifinal
3	China	Zhao Zhenzhen	3	1	2	—	15	28	Semifinal
4	Chinese Taipei	Cheng Li-lin	3	0	3	—	13	32	

Source: World Curling

5 February, 12:00

Sheet B	1	2	3	4	5	6	7	8	9	10	Final
Japan	0	0	1	1	0	3	0	3	3	X	11
China 🔨	0	2	0	0	2	0	0	0	0	X	4

Sheet D	1	2	3	4	5	6	7	8	9	10	Final
South Korea	2	1	0	2	1	0	2	2	0	1	11
Chinese Taipei 🔨	0	0	1	0	0	2	0	0	1	0	4

5 February, 17:00

Sheet A	1	2	3	4	5	6	7	8	9	10	Final
China	0	1	0	1	0	0	1	0	0	X	3
South Korea 🔨	2	0	2	0	2	2	0	1	1	X	10

Sheet C	1	2	3	4	5	6	7	8	9	10	Final
Chinese Taipei	0	0	1	0	0	1	0	0	X	X	2
Japan 🔨	2	0	0	4	1	0	3	3	X	X	13

6 February, 10:00

Sheet B	1	2	3	4	5	6	7	8	9	10	Final
Japan	1	0	0	0	0	3	1	0	1	0	6
South Korea 🔨	0	1	0	1	1	0	0	1	0	0	4

Sheet D	1	2	3	4	5	6	7	8	9	10	Final
Chinese Taipei	0	1	2	0	1	0	2	0	0	1	7
China 🔨	1	0	0	1	0	2	0	3	1	0	8

=== Knockout round ===
Semifinal			Final
			1	Japan	7
2	South Korea	8	2	South Korea	6
3	China	4

==== Semifinal ====
7 February, 9:30

Sheet C	1	2	3	4	5	6	7	8	9	10	Final
South Korea 🔨	1	0	2	0	3	1	0	1	0	0	8
China	0	0	0	1	0	0	1	0	1	1	4

==== Final ====
7 February, 14:30

Sheet C	1	2	3	4	5	6	7	8	9	10	11	Final
South Korea	0	0	0	0	1	0	1	3	0	1	0	6
Japan 🔨	2	1	1	0	0	1	0	0	1	0	1	7

== Final standing ==
Rank	Team	Pld	W	L
1st place, gold medalist(s)	Japan	4	4	0
2nd place, silver medalist(s)	South Korea	5	3	2
3rd place, bronze medalist(s)	China	4	1	3
4	Chinese Taipei	3	0	3
