= Snowboarding at the 2003 Asian Winter Games – Men's halfpipe =

Men's halfpipe at the 2003 Asian Winter Games
- Venue: Ajigasawa Ski Area
- Dates: 2 February 2003
- Competitors: 8 from 2 nations

Medalists
gold medal	Daisuke Murakami	Japan
silver medal	Takaharu Nakai	Japan
bronze medal	Han Jin-bae	South Korea

The men's snowboard halfpipe competition at the 2003 Asian Winter Games in Aomori, Japan was held on 2 February at the Ajigasawa Ski Area.

== Schedule ==
All times are Japan Standard Time (UTC+09:00)

Date	Time	Event
Sunday, 2 February 2003	10:00	Election
Sunday, 2 February 2003	12:00	Final

== Results ==
=== Election ===
Rank	Athlete	Score
1	Daisuke Murakami (JPN)	43.1
2	Domu Narita (JPN)	41.8
3	Han Jin-bae (KOR)	41.7
4	Takaharu Nakai (JPN)	40.9
5	Kim Soo-chul (KOR)	30.3
6	Fumiyuki Murakami (JPN)	29.5
7	Lee Jae-woong (KOR)	25.4
8	Lee Chang-ho (KOR)	23.1

=== Final ===
Rank	Athlete	1st run	2nd run	Best
1st place, gold medalist(s)	Daisuke Murakami (JPN)	43.3	34.6	43.3
2nd place, silver medalist(s)	Takaharu Nakai (JPN)	41.2	40.2	41.2
3rd place, bronze medalist(s)	Han Jin-bae (KOR)	37.6	34.4	37.6
4	Domu Narita (JPN)	29.0	14.3	29.0
5	Lee Jae-woong (KOR)	21.1	28.6	28.6
6	Fumiyuki Murakami (JPN)	26.4	17.7	26.4
7	Lee Chang-ho (KOR)	18.9	22.4	22.4
8	Kim Soo-chul (KOR)	20.3	20.3	20.3
