= Cross-country skiing at the 2003 Asian Winter Games – Women's 5 kilometre classical =

Women's 5 kilometre classical at the 2003 Asian Winter Games
- Venue: Ajara Athletic Park
- Dates: 2 February 2003
- Competitors: 16 from 5 nations

Medalists
gold medal	Svetlana Malahova-Shishkina	Kazakhstan
silver medal	Oxana Yatskaya	Kazakhstan
bronze medal	Yelena Antonova	Kazakhstan

The women's 5 kilometre classical at the 2003 Asian Winter Games was held on February 2, 2003 at Ajara Athletic Park, Japan.

== Schedule ==
All times are Japan Standard Time (UTC+09:00)

Date	Time	Event
Sunday, 2 February 2003	09:30	Final

== Results ==
Rank	Athlete	Time
1st place, gold medalist(s)	Svetlana Malahova-Shishkina (KAZ)	14:50.2
2nd place, silver medalist(s)	Oxana Yatskaya (KAZ)	14:51.4
3rd place, bronze medalist(s)	Yelena Antonova (KAZ)	15:11.7
4	Nobuko Fukuda (JPN)	15:14.0
5	Madoka Natsumi (JPN)	15:16.0
6	Hou Yuxia (CHN)	15:23.7
7	Sumiko Yokoyama (JPN)	15:45.1
8	Yelena Kolomina (KAZ)	15:56.3
9	Yuka Koshita (JPN)	15:58.3
10	Luan Zhengrong (CHN)	16:05.2
11	Lee Chun-ja (KOR)	16:06.5
12	Li Hongxue (CHN)	16:24.8
13	Kim Hyo-young (KOR)	17:49.2
14	Choi Seul-bi (KOR)	18:08.5
15	Erdene-Ochiryn Ochirsüren (MGL)	19:48.2
16	Luuzangiin Narantsetseg (MGL)	21:57.6
