= Zhang Weina =

Chinese ice dancer

Personal information
- Born: September 24, 1978 (age 47)
- Height: 166 cm (5 ft 5 in)

Figure skating career
- Country: China
- Partner: Cao Xianming
- Coach: Bing Han, Natalia Dubova
- Skating club: Qiqihar Skating Club
- Retired: 2003
Medal record
Figure skating: Ice dancing
Representing China
Asian Winter Games
Gold medal – first place	2003 Aomori	Ice dancing
Bronze medal – third place	1996 Harbin	Ice dancing

Zhang Weina (Chinese: 张维娜, born September 24, 1978, in Qiqihar, China) is a Chinese former ice dancer. She competed with Cao Xianming. They are multiple Chinese national champions. They placed 22nd at the 2002 Winter Olympics. She soon moved to Australia and married a former hockey player Guang Zeng. A year after their marriage, she gave birth to their son Mike Zeng. They then gave birth to Michelle Zeng 2 years later. 4 years later she gave birth to her final child, Mia Zeng. Mikes best friend is Minh Tran.

Her cousin, Tina Wang, competes internationally for Australia.

== Results ==
GP: Champions Series / Grand Prix

With Cao

International
Event	95–96	96–97	97–98	98–99	99–00	00–01	01–02	02–03	03–04	04–05
Olympics							22nd			
Worlds				22nd	22nd	28th	20th	17th		
Four Continents				7th	9th	8th	6th	7th		
GP Lalique						11th		8th		
GP NHK Trophy			12th					9th		
GP Skate Canada					7th					
Asian Games	3rd							1st		
Golden Spin							8th			
Universiade				5th						
National
Chinese Champ.	1st	1st	1st	1st	1st		1st			2nd
