= Cao Xianming =

Chinese ice dancer

Personal information
- Born: February 13, 1976 (age 50)
- Height: 170 cm (5 ft 7 in)

Figure skating career
- Country: China
- Partner: Zhang Weina
- Coach: Bing Han, Natalia Dubova
- Skating club: Qiqihar Skating Club
- Retired: 2003
Medal record
Figure skating
Ice dancing
Representing China
Asian Winter Games
Gold medal – first place	2003 Aomori	Ice dancing
Bronze medal – third place	1996 Harbin	Ice dancing

Cao Xianming (Chinese: 曹宪明, born February 13, 1976, in Qiqihar, China) is a Chinese former ice dancer. He competes with Zhang Weina. They are multiple Chinese national champions. They placed 22nd at the 2002 Winter Olympics.

Cao is now an International Judge for China.

Cao Xianmning currently also coaches his daughter Cao Luchang, also an ice dancer

== Results ==
GP: Champions Series / Grand Prix

With Zhang

International
Event	95–96	96–97	97–98	98–99	99–00	00–01	01–02	02–03	03–04	04–05
Olympics							22nd			
Worlds				22nd	22nd	28th	20th	17th		
Four Continents				7th	9th	8th	6th	7th		
GP Lalique						11th		8th		
GP NHK Trophy			12th					9th		
GP Skate Canada					7th					
Asian Games	3rd							1st		
Golden Spin							8th			
Universiade				5th						
National
Chinese Champ.	1st	1st	1st	1st	1st		1st			2nd
