= Cross-country skiing at the 2003 Asian Winter Games – Women's 10 kilometre freestyle =

Women's 10 kilometre freestyle at the 2003 Asian Winter Games
- Venue: Ajara Athletic Park
- Dates: 4 February 2003
- Competitors: 16 from 5 nations

Medalists
gold medal	Oxana Yatskaya	Kazakhstan
silver medal	Svetlana Malahova-Shishkina	Kazakhstan
bronze medal	Hou Yuxia	China

The women's 10 kilometre freestyle at the 2003 Asian Winter Games was held on February 4, 2003 at Ajara Athletic Park, Japan.

== Schedule ==
All times are Japan Standard Time (UTC+09:00)

Date	Time	Event
Tuesday, 4 February 2003	10:00	Final

== Results ==
Rank	Athlete	Time
1st place, gold medalist(s)	Oxana Yatskaya (KAZ)	26:55.3
2nd place, silver medalist(s)	Svetlana Malahova-Shishkina (KAZ)	27:13.8
3rd place, bronze medalist(s)	Hou Yuxia (CHN)	27:56.8
4	Darya Starostina (KAZ)	28:23.3
5	Sumiko Yokoyama (JPN)	28:29.5
6	Chizuru Soneta (JPN)	28:49.5
7	Nobuko Fukuda (JPN)	28:53.6
8	Yelena Kolomina (KAZ)	28:59.5
9	Lee Chun-ja (KOR)	29:14.1
10	Li Hongxue (CHN)	29:14.4
11	Madoka Natsumi (JPN)	29:51.9
12	Liu Hongyan (CHN)	31:13.6
13	Kim Hyo-young (KOR)	32:39.4
14	Choi Seul-bi (KOR)	32:40.3
15	Erdene-Ochiryn Ochirsüren (MGL)	40:06.1
16	Luuzangiin Narantsetseg (MGL)	41:13.5
