= Freestyle skiing at the 2003 Asian Winter Games – Women's moguls =

Women's moguls at the 2003 Asian Winter Games
- Venue: Ajigasawa Ski Area
- Dates: 6 February 2003
- Competitors: 6 from 2 nations

Medalists
gold medal	Aiko Uemura	Japan
silver medal	Irina Kormysheva	Kazakhstan
bronze medal	Yumi Kubota	Japan

The women's moguls at the 2003 Asian Winter Games was held on 6 February 2003 at Ajigasawa Ski Area, Japan.

== Schedule ==
All times are Japan Standard Time (UTC+09:00)

Date	Time	Event
Thursday, 6 February 2003	11:20	Election
Thursday, 6 February 2003	13:00	Final

== Results ==
Legend

- DNS — Did not start

=== Final ===
Rank	Athlete	Score
1st place, gold medalist(s)	Aiko Uemura (JPN)	26.43
2nd place, silver medalist(s)	Irina Kormysheva (KAZ)	22.94
3rd place, bronze medalist(s)	Yumi Kubota (JPN)	21.17
4	Miyuki Hatanaka (JPN)	20.84
5	Mariya Chakileva (KAZ)	19.53
—	Tae Satoya (JPN)	DNS
