= Ran Iida =

Japanese snowboarder (born 1979)

Personal information
- Nationality: Japanese
- Born: 16 April 1979 (age 46); Sapporo, Japan

Sport
- Sport: Snowboarding

Ran Iida (born 16 April 1979) is a Japanese snowboarder. She competed in the women's parallel giant slalom event at the 2002 Winter Olympics.
