= Snowboarding at the 2003 Asian Winter Games – Men's slalom =

Men's slalom at the 2003 Asian Winter Games
- Venue: Ajigasawa Ski Area
- Dates: 4 February 2003
- Competitors: 11 from 5 nations

Medalists
gold medal	Kohei Kawaguchi	Japan
silver medal	Ji Myung-kon	South Korea
bronze medal	Kentaro Tsuruoka	Japan

The men's slalom competition at the 2003 Asian Winter Games in Aomori, Japan was held on 4 February 2003 at the Ajigasawa Ski Area.

== Schedule ==
All times are Japan Standard Time (UTC+09:00)

Date	Time	Event
Tuesday, 4 February 2003	10:00	1st run
Tuesday, 4 February 2003	12:10	2nd run

== Results ==
Rank	Athlete	1st run	2nd run	Total
1st place, gold medalist(s)	Kohei Kawaguchi (JPN)	49.84	49.09	1:38.93
2nd place, silver medalist(s)	Ji Myung-kon (KOR)	51.00	49.34	1:40.34
3rd place, bronze medalist(s)	Kentaro Tsuruoka (JPN)	51.20	49.61	1:40.81
4	Teruumi Fujimoto (JPN)	53.57	50.42	1:43.99
5	Ji Won-duk (KOR)	56.51	50.39	1:46.90
6	Fuyuki Hattori (JPN)	54.53	52.38	1:46.91
7	Hossein Kalhor (IRI)	54.86	52.38	1:47.24
8	Hossein Seid (IRI)	55.04	52.68	1:47.72
9	Wang Jen-hsiang (TPE)	57.29	53.55	1:50.84
10	Zaher El-Hage (LIB)	56.74	55.21	1:51.95
11	Morteza Seid (IRI)	56.84	55.94	1:52.78
