= Niki Fürstauer =

Austrian alpine skier (born 1980)

Medal record

Men's alpine skiing

Representing Lebanon

Asian Games
Gold medal – first place	2003 Aomori	Giant slalom
Silver medal – second place	2003 Aomori	Slalom

Nicolas "Niki" Fürstauer (born July 18, 1980) is an Austrian alpine skier. He competed for Lebanon at the 2002 Winter Olympics in the slalom event, and also won the first ever and first gold Asian Winter Games medal for Lebanon at 2003 Asian Winter Games.
