= Snowboarding at the 2003 Asian Winter Games – Men's giant slalom =

Men's giant slalom at the 2003 Asian Winter Games
- Venue: Ajigasawa Ski Area
- Dates: 3 February 2003
- Competitors: 12 from 5 nations

Medalists
| gold medal | Kohei Kawaguchi | Japan |
| silver medal | Teruumi Fujimoto | Japan |
| bronze medal | Kentaro Tsuruoka | Japan |

The men's giant slalom competition at the 2003 Asian Winter Games in Aomori, Japan was held on 3 February at the Ajigasawa Ski Area.

== Schedule ==
All times are Japan Standard Time (UTC+09:00)

| Date | Time | Event |
|---|---|---|
| Monday, 3 February 2003 | 10:00 | 1st run |
| Monday, 3 February 2003 | 12:45 | 2nd run |

== Results ==
| Rank | Athlete | 1st run | 2nd run | Total |
|---|---|---|---|---|
| 1st place, gold medalist(s) | Kohei Kawaguchi (JPN) | 1:09.78 | 1:12.66 | 2:22.44 |
| 2nd place, silver medalist(s) | Teruumi Fujimoto (JPN) | 1:11.18 | 1:13.29 | 2:24.47 |
| 3rd place, bronze medalist(s) | Kentaro Tsuruoka (JPN) | 1:10.56 | 1:13.96 | 2:24.52 |
| 4 | Ji Won-duk (KOR) | 1:12.13 | 1:12.66 | 2:24.79 |
| 5 | Fuyuki Hattori (JPN) | 1:12.09 | 1:13.70 | 2:25.79 |
| 6 | Ji Myung-kon (KOR) | 1:12.74 | 1:13.72 | 2:26.46 |
| 7 | Wang Jen-hsiang (TPE) | 1:12.62 | 1:15.28 | 2:27.90 |
| 8 | Hossein Kalhor (IRI) | 1:13.95 | 1:16.83 | 2:30.78 |
| 9 | Hossein Seid (IRI) | 1:14.72 | 1:17.04 | 2:31.76 |
| 10 | Mosayyeb Seid (IRI) | 1:15.24 | 1:18.23 | 2:33.47 |
| 11 | Morteza Seid (IRI) | 1:17.06 | 1:17.12 | 2:34.18 |
| 12 | Zaher El-Hage (LIB) | 1:14.80 | 1:19.72 | 2:34.52 |
