= Freestyle skiing at the 2003 Asian Winter Games – Men's moguls =

Men's moguls at the 2003 Asian Winter Games
- Venue: Ajigasawa Ski Area
- Dates: 6 February 2003
- Competitors: 7 from 3 nations

Medalists
gold medal	Yu Masukawa	Japan
silver medal	Kenro Shimoyama	Japan
bronze medal	Ivan Sidorov	Kazakhstan

The men's moguls at the 2003 Asian Winter Games was held on 6 February 2003 at Ajigasawa Ski Area, Japan.

== Schedule ==
All times are Japan Standard Time (UTC+09:00)

Date	Time	Event
Thursday, 6 February 2003	11:20	Election
Thursday, 6 February 2003	13:00	Final

== Results ==
Legend

- DNS — Did not start

=== Final ===
Rank	Athlete	Score
1st place, gold medalist(s)	Yu Masukawa (JPN)	25.89
2nd place, silver medalist(s)	Kenro Shimoyama (JPN)	25.67
3rd place, bronze medalist(s)	Ivan Sidorov (KAZ)	20.08
4	Dmitriy Tsoberg (KAZ)	19.93
5	Osamu Ueno (JPN)	14.32
6	Chagnaagiin Aranzalzul (MGL)	0.78
—	Yugo Tsukita (JPN)	DNS
