= Fumiyuki Murakami =

Japanese snowboarder (born 1985)

Personal information
- Nationality: Japanese
- Born: 14 June 1985 (age 40); Sapporo, Japan

Sport
- Sport: Snowboarding

Fumiyuki Murakami (born 14 June 1985) is a Japanese snowboarder. He competed in the men's halfpipe event at the 2006 Winter Olympics.
