= Choi Yun-suk =

South Korean speed skater

Personal information
- Nationality: South Korean
- Born: 5 September 1979 (age 45); Gyeongsangbuk, South Korea

Sport
- Sport: Speed skating

Choi Yun-suk (born 5 September 1979) is a South Korean speed skater. She competed in the women's 1500 metres at the 2002 Winter Olympics.
