= Lee Seung-hwan (speed skater) =

South Korean speed skater

Personal information
- Nationality: South Korean
- Born: 3 February 1984 (age 41)

Sport
- Sport: Speed skating

Lee Seung-hwan (born 3 February 1984) is a South Korean speed skater. He competed in the men's 5000 metres event at the 2002 Winter Olympics.
