= Maxim Polunin =

Kazakhstani ski jumper (born 1975)

Personal information
- Nationality: Kazakhstani
- Born: 23 June 1975 (age 49); Almaty, Kazakhstan

Sport
- Sport: Ski jumping

Maxim Polunin (born 23 June 1975) is a Kazakhstani ski jumper. He competed in the normal hill and large hill events at the 2002 Winter Olympics.
