= Olesya Persidskaya =

Kazakhstani alpine skier (born 1978)

Personal information
- Nationality: Kazakhstani
- Born: 16 December 1978 (age 47) Almaty, Soviet Union

Sport
- Sport: Alpine skiing

Olesya Persidskaya (Олеся Валерьевна Персидская, born 16 December 1978) is a Kazakhstani alpine skier. She competed in two events at the 2002 Winter Olympics.
