= Rie Arikawa =

Japanese ice dancer and coach

Personal information
- Born: January 16, 1981 (age 45) Kyoto, Japan
- Height: 1.57 m (5 ft 2 in)

Figure skating career
- Country: Japan
- Discipline: Ice dance
- Began skating: 1984
- Retired: 2003

Rie Arikawa (有川 梨絵, Arikawa Rie; born January 16, 1981 in Kyoto) is a Japanese ice dancing coach and former competitor. With Kenji Miyamoto, she won two Japanese national titles and competed at seven ISU Championships.

== Career ==
Arikawa began learning to skate in 1984.

=== Partnership with Miyamoto ===
She teamed up with Kenji Miyamoto no later than 1995. After winning the Japanese junior title, they were sent to the 1996 World Junior Championships in Brisbane, Australia, where they finished 22nd. The following season, they placed second at the Japan Junior Championships. They regained their national junior title before placing 16th at the 1998 World Junior Championships in Saint John, New Brunswick, Canada.

Advancing to the senior ranks, Arikawa/Miyamoto competed at their first Grand Prix events and became the national silver medalists in the 1998–1999 season. They took silver at the Asian Winter Games in South Korea and placed 9th at the 1999 Four Continents Championships in Canada.

In the 2001–2002 season, Arikawa/Miyamoto won their first senior national title and then placed 8th at the Four Continents Championships in Jeonju, South Korea. Making their only World Championships appearance, they qualified to the free dance and finished 24th overall in Nagano, Japan.

Arikawa/Miyamoto repeated as national champions the following season. In February 2003, they won the bronze medal at the Asian Winter Games in Aomori, Japan, and placed 8th at their final competition, the Four Continents Championships in Beijing, China. They were coached by Muriel Zazoui, Pasquale Camerlengo, Romain Haguenauer in Lyon, France.

=== Post-competitive career ===
Arikawa has coached ice dancers Emi Hirai / Marien De La Asuncion and Misato Komatsubara / Timothy Koleto.

== Programs ==
with Miyamoto

Season	Original dance	Free dance
2002–2003	Waltz: Aquarellen by Josef Strauss performed by the Vienna Philharmonic; Polka	Conan the Barbarian by Basil Poledouris
2001–2002	Tango: Tango del Atardecer by Lalo Schifrin; Flamenco: Fiesta de Jerez by Carmen Amaya	Kojiki by Kitarō

== Results ==
GP: Grand Prix

with Miyamoto

International
Event	95–96	96–97	97–98	98–99	99–00	00–01	01–02	02–03
Worlds							24th	
Four Continents				9th	11th		8th	8th
GP Lalique						12th		
GP NHK Trophy				9th	9th		9th	11th
GP Sparkassen					9th			
GP Skate America				9th				
GP Skate Canada						10th		
Asian Games				2nd				3rd
International: Junior
Junior Worlds	22nd		16th					
National
Japan				2nd	3rd	3rd	1st	1st
Japan Junior	1st	2nd	1st					
