= Lu Zhuo =

Chinese speed skater

Personal information
- Nationality: Chinese
- Born: 18 November 1980 (age 44)

Sport
- Sport: Speed skating

Lu Zhuo (born 18 November 1980) is a Chinese speed skater. He competed in two events at the 2006 Winter Olympics.
