= Choi Im-heon =

South Korean cross-country skier (born 1983)

Personal information
- Nationality: South Korean
- Born: 13 January 1983 (age 42)

Sport
- Sport: Cross-country skiing

Choi Im-heon (born 13 January 1983) is a South Korean cross-country skier. He competed at the 2002 Winter Olympics and the 2006 Winter Olympics.
