= Akira Higashi =

Japanese ski jumper

Akira Higashi 東 輝
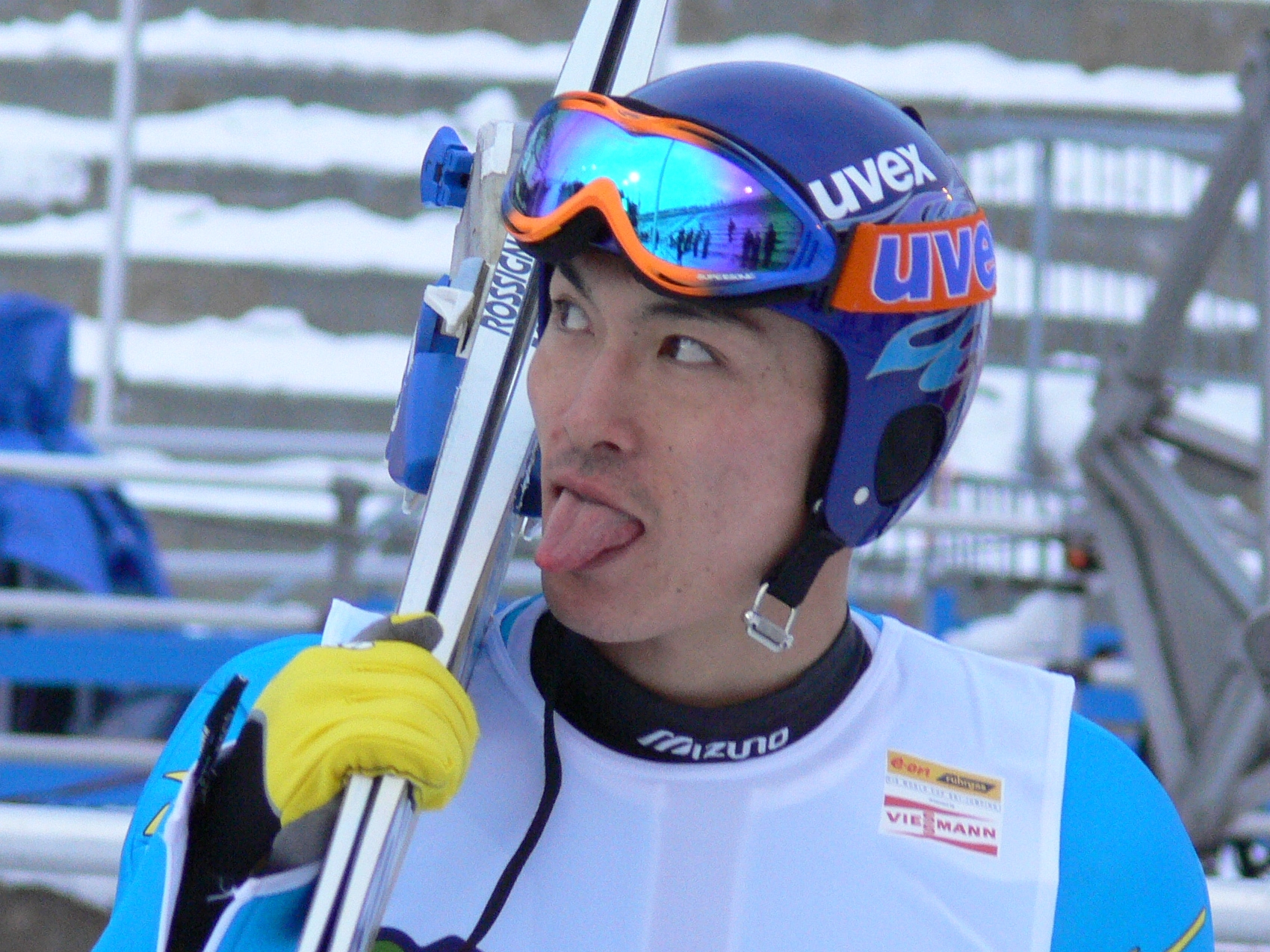

Personal information
- Full name: 東 輝
- Nationality: Japan
- Born: 7 January 1972 (age 54) Niki, Hokkaidō, Japan
- Height: 1.65 m (5 ft 5 in)

Sport
- Sport: Skiing

World Cup career
- Seasons: 1989–2000; 2002–2006; 2008–2010
- Indiv. starts: 105
- Indiv. podiums: 3
- Indiv. wins: 2
- Team starts: 6
- Team podiums: 1

Achievements and titles
- Personal bests: 212.5 m (697 ft); Planica, 22 February 2004
Medal record
Men's ski jumping
FIS Nordic World Ski Championships
Silver medal – second place	2003 Val di Fiemme	Team LH
- Updated on 10 February 2016

Akira Higashi (東 輝, Higashi Akira) (born 7 January 1972) is a Japanese former ski jumper.

== Career ==
His debut World Cup performance was on 17 December 1988 in Sapporo. He won a silver medal in the team large hill at the 2003 FIS Nordic World Ski Championships in Val di Fiemme and had his individual finish of 10th in the individual large hill at those same championships. Higashi also competed in the FIS Ski Flying World Championships, finishing 5th in the 2004 team event and 15th in the 1998 individual event. He also had six individual victories at various hill sizes from 1992 to 2004.

== World Cup ==
=== Standings ===
Season	Overall	4H	SF	NT	JP
1988/89	52	—	N/A	N/A	N/A
1989/90	—	—	N/A	N/A	N/A
1990/91	—	—	—	N/A	N/A
1991/92	—	—	—	N/A	N/A
1992/93	20	25	—	N/A	N/A
1993/94	68	—	—	N/A	N/A
1995/96	66	—	—	N/A	64
1996/97	25	—	6	14	48
1997/98	23	—	8	23	36
1998/99	—	—	—	—	—
1999/00	—	—	—	—	—
2001/02	53	—	N/A	39	N/A
2002/03	49	—	N/A	—	N/A
2003/04	25	42	N/A	12	N/A
2004/05	42	21	N/A	42	N/A
2005/06	—	—	N/A	43	N/A
2007/08	75	—	N/A	—	N/A
2008/09	—	—	—	—	N/A
2009/10	82	—	—	—	N/A

=== Wins ===
No.	Season	Date	Location	Hill	Size
1	1992/93	20 December 1992	(Japan) Sapporo	Ōkurayama K115	LH
2	1996/97	23 March 1997	(Slovenia) Planica	Velikanka bratov Gorišek K185	FH
