= Yukari Watanabe =

Japanese speed skater (born 1981)

Personal information
- Nationality: Japanese
- Born: 28 April 1981 (age 43); Wakkanai, Hokkaido, Japan

Sport
- Sport: Speed skating

Yukari Watanabe (渡邊 ゆかり, Watanabe Yukari, born 28 April 1981) is a Japanese speed skater. She competed at the 2002 Winter Olympics and the 2006 Winter Olympics.
