= Anzhelika Gavrilova =

Kazakhstani speed skater (born 1978)

Personal information
- Nationality: Kazakhstani
- Born: 14 April 1978 (age 48) Astana, Soviet Union

Sport
- Sport: Speed skating

Anzhelika Gavrilova (Makisheva) (Анжелика Анатольевна Гаврилова (Макишева), born 14 April 1978) is a Kazakhstani speed skater. She competed in two events at the 2002 Winter Olympics.
