= Qu Donghai =

Chinese cross-country skier

Personal information
- Nationality: Chinese
- Born: 28 December 1973 (age 51)

Sport
- Sport: Cross-country skiing

Qu Donghai (born 28 December 1973) is a Chinese cross-country skier. He competed in the men's 10 kilometre classical event at the 1998 Winter Olympics.
