= Irina Kormysheva =

Kazakhstani freestyle skier (born 1976)

Personal information
- Nationality: Kazakhstani
- Born: 22 July 1976 (age 49)

Sport
- Sport: Freestyle skiing

Irina Kormysheva (Ирина Александровна Кормышева, born 22 July 1976) is a Kazakhstani freestyle skier. She competed in the women's moguls event at the 1998 Winter Olympics.
