= Marina Pupina =

Kazakhstani speed skater

Personal information
- Nationality: Kazakhstani
- Born: 15 May 1977 (age 48) Kostanay, Soviet Union

Sport
- Sport: Speed skating

Marina Pupina (Марина Леонидовна Пупина, born 15 May 1977) is a Kazakhstani speed skater. She competed in two events at the 2002 Winter Olympics.
