= Takaharu Nakajima =

Japanese speed skater (born 1983)

Personal information
- Nationality: Japanese
- Born: 2 January 1983 (age 42); Nagano, Japan

Sport
- Sport: Speed skating

Takaharu Nakajima (中嶋 敬春, Nakajima Takaharu; born 2 January 1983) is a Japanese speed skater. He competed at the 2002 Winter Olympics and the 2006 Winter Olympics.
