= Andrey Golovko =

Kazakhstani cross-country skier (born 1980)

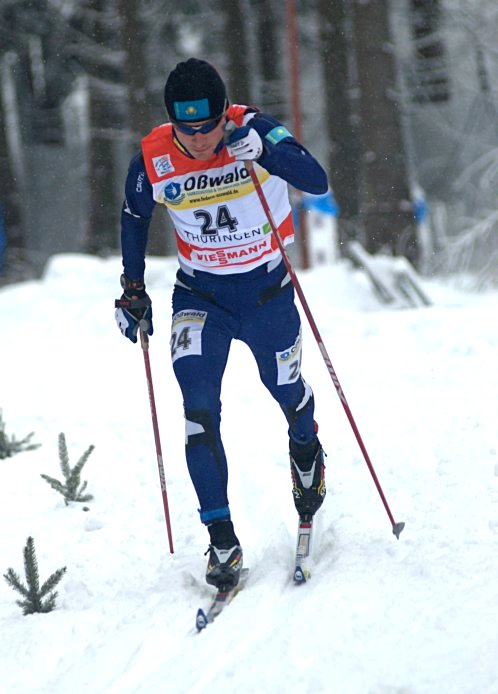
Andrey Golovko at the 2009-10 Tour de Ski.

Andrey Golovko (born 1980) is a Kazakhstani cross-country skier. He competed at the Winter Olympics in 2002 in Salt Lake City, and in Turin in 2006, placing 29th in the 30 km and 29th in the 50 km.
