= Kenro Shimoyama =

Japanese freestyle skier (born 1982)

Personal information
- Nationality: Japanese
- Born: 12 March 1982 (age 43); Yuzawa, Japan

Sport
- Sport: Freestyle skiing

Kenro Shimoyama (下山 研郎, Shimoyama Kenrō, born 12 March 1982) is a Japanese freestyle skier. He competed in the men's moguls event at the 2002 Winter Olympics.
