= Takaharu Nakai =

Japanese snowboarder (born 1984)

Personal information
- Nationality: Japanese
- Born: 10 March 1984 (age 41); Hokkaido, Japan

Sport
- Sport: Snowboarding

Takaharu Nakai (born 10 March 1984) is a Japanese snowboarder. He competed at the 2002 Winter Olympics and the 2006 Winter Olympics.
