= Mitsuo Horigome =

Japanese cross-country skier (born 1974)

Medal record

Men's cross-country skiing

Representing Japan

Asian Winter Games
Silver medal – second place	1999 Gangwon	4 × 10 km relay

Junior World Championships
Gold medal – first place	1994 Breitenwang	30 km freestyle
Gold medal – first place	1994 Breitenwang	4 × 10 km relay
Bronze medal – third place	1994 Breitenwang	10 km classical

Mitsuo Horigome (堀米 光男, Horigome Mitsuo, born April 6, 1974) is a Japanese cross-country skier who competed from 1993 to 2006.

Horigome competed in three Winter Olympics, and he earned his best career finish with a seventh in the 4 x 10 km relay at Nagano in 1998 while earning his best individual finish of 19th in the 30 km event at Lillehammer in 1994.

Horigome's best finish at the FIS Nordic World Ski Championships was 20th in the 50 km event at Val di Fiemme in 2003. His best World Cup finish was seventh in a 10 km event in Switzerland in 2000.

Horigome earned six individual victories in lesser events up to 30 km from 1994 to 2006.
