= Noriko Fukushima =

Japanese freestyle skier (born 1979)

Personal information
- Born: October 18, 1979 Hakuba, Japan

Sport
- Sport: Skiing

World Cup career
- Indiv. podiums: 1
- Updated on July 31, 2013

Noriko Fukushima (福島のり子, Fukushima Noriko; born October 18, 1979) is a Japanese freestyle skier, specializing in ski cross.

Fukushima competed at the 2010 Winter Olympics for Japan. She placed 21st in the qualifying round in ski cross, to advance to the knockout stages. She finish third in her first round heat, failing to advance.

As of April 2013, her best finish at the World Championships is 6th, in 2005.

Fukushima made her World Cup debut in January 2004. As of April 2013, she has one World Cup podium finish, a third place coming at Flaine in 2007–08. Her best World Cup overall finish in ski cross is 5th, in 2007–08.

== World Cup podiums ==
Date	Location	Rank	Event
16 January 2008	Flaine	3rd place, bronze medalist(s)	Ski cross
