= Kesato Miyazaki =

Japanese speed skater (born 1981)

Personal information
- Nationality: Japanese
- Born: 4 April 1981 (age 44) Gunma, Japan

Sport
- Sport: Speed skating

Kesato Miyazaki (born 4 April 1981) is a Japanese speed skater. He competed in two events at the 2006 Winter Olympics.
