= Reina Umehara =

Japanese freestyle skier (born 1983)

Personal information
- Born: 1 August 1983 (age 41)

Sport
- Country: Japan
- Sport: freestyle skiing
- Event: ski cross

Reina Umehara (梅原 玲奈, Umehara Reina, born 1 August 1983) is a Japanese freestyle skier.

She competed in the 2018 Winter Olympics, in ski cross. She also participated in the 2009, 2011, 2015 and 2017 FIS Freestyle World Ski Championships.
