= Daisuke Murakami (snowboarder) =

Japanese snowboarder (born 1983)

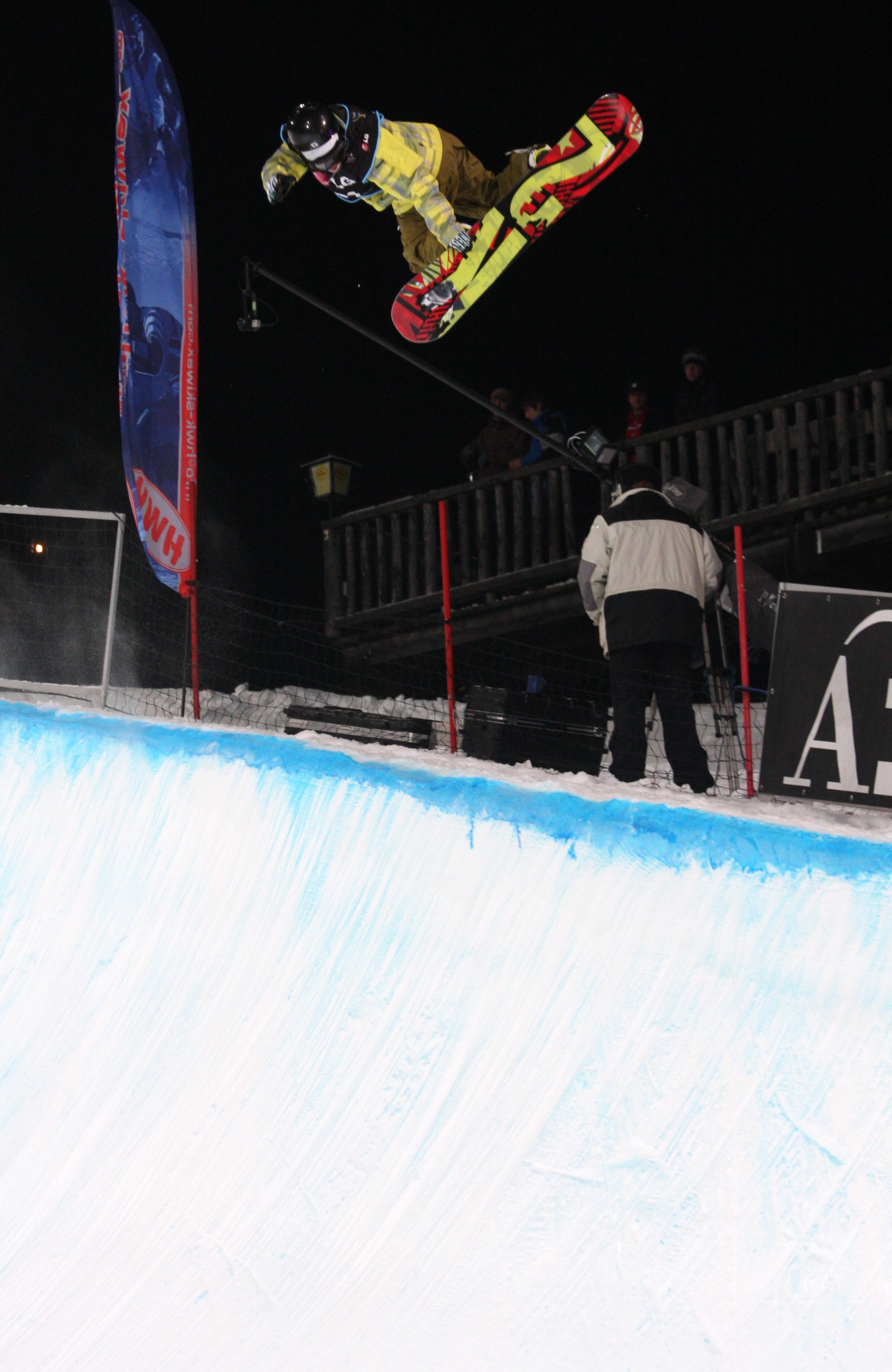

Personal information
- Born: May 18, 1983 (age 43) Sapporo

Sport
- Country: Japan
- Sport: Snowboarding
- Event: Half-pipe
Medal record
Men's snowboarding
Representing Japan
Asian Games
Gold medal – first place	2003 Aomori	Halfpipe
Bronze medal – third place	2007 Changchun	Halfpipe

Daisuke Murakami (村上 大輔, Murakami Daisuke; born May 18, 1983 in Sapporo) is a Japanese snowboarder who competes in the half-pipe event. He represented Japan at the 2002 Winter Olympics, where he placed 19th. He won the 2009–10 FIS Snowboard World Cup event in Kreischberg, Austria, his first career World Cup victory. He won the half-pipe event at the 2003 Asian Winter Games, the first time the event was contested.
