= Kentaro Tsuruoka =

Japanese snowboarder (born 1974)

Personal information
- Nationality: Japanese
- Born: 26 August 1974 (age 50); Chiba, Japan

Sport
- Sport: Snowboarding

Kentaro Tsuruoka (born 26 August 1974) is a Japanese snowboarder. He competed in the men's parallel giant slalom event at the 2006 Winter Olympics.
