= Zhang Chengye (biathlete) =

Chinese biathlete (born 1982)

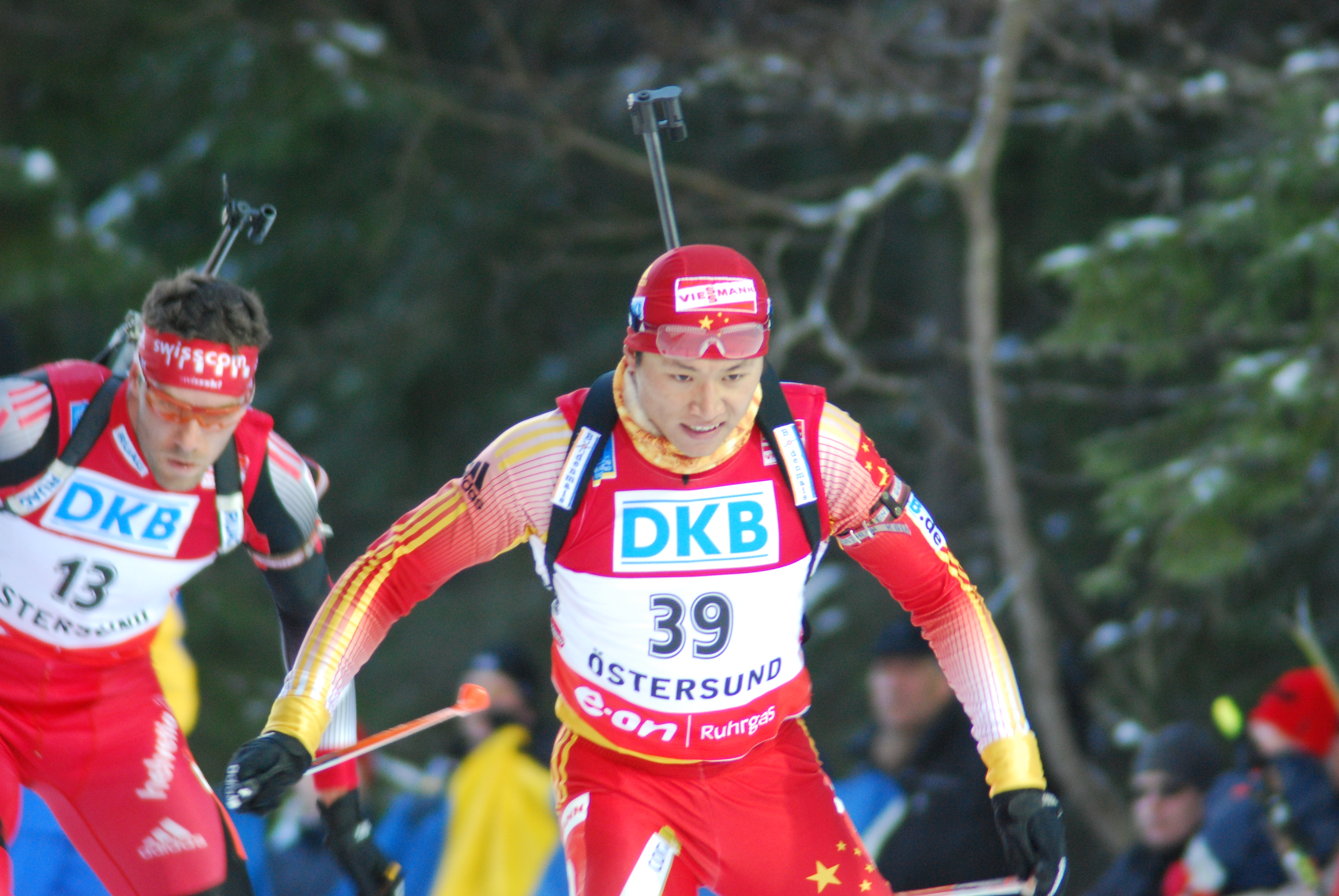
- Zhang in 2008

Medal record

Men's biathlon

Representing China

Asian Games
| Gold medal – first place | 2007 Changchun | 4×7.5 km relay |
| Silver medal – second place | 2007 Changchun | 10 km sprint |
| Bronze medal – third place | 2011 Astana-Almaty | 4×7.5 km relay |

Zhang Chengye (simplified Chinese: 张成烨; traditional Chinese: 張成燁; pinyin: Zhāng Chéngyè; born May 20, 1982, in Jilin) is a Chinese biathlete who competed in the 2006 Winter Olympics in both biathlon and cross-country skiing. He is set to compete for China at the 2010 Winter Olympics in Men's biathlon.
