= Mostafa Mirhashemi =

Iranian cross-country skier

Seyed Mostafa Mirhashemi
Personal information
- Native name: سيد مصطفی میرهاشمی
- Nationality: Iranian
- Born: 6 August 1974 (age 50); Shemshak, Iran
- Height: 172 cm (5 ft 8 in)
- Weight: 71 kg (157 lb; 11 st 3 lb)

Sport
- Country: Iran
- Sport: Cross-country skiing

Seyed Mostafa Mirhashemi (Persian: سيد مصطفی میرهاشمی, born 6 August 1974) is an Iranian cross-country skier. He competed in the men's 2 × 10 kilometre pursuit event at the 2002 Winter Olympics.
