= Mojtaba Mirhashemi =

Iranian cross-country skier

Seyed Mojtaba Mirhashemi
Personal information
- Nationality: Iranian
- Born: 21 March 1966 (age 59)

Sport
- Sport: Cross-country skiing

Seyed Mojtaba Mirhashemi (Persian: سيد مجتبی میرهاشمی, born 21 March 1966) is an Iranian cross-country skier. He competed in the men's 15 kilometre classical event at the 2006 Winter Olympics.
