= Maxim Odnodvortsev =

Kazakhstani cross-country skier (born 1980)

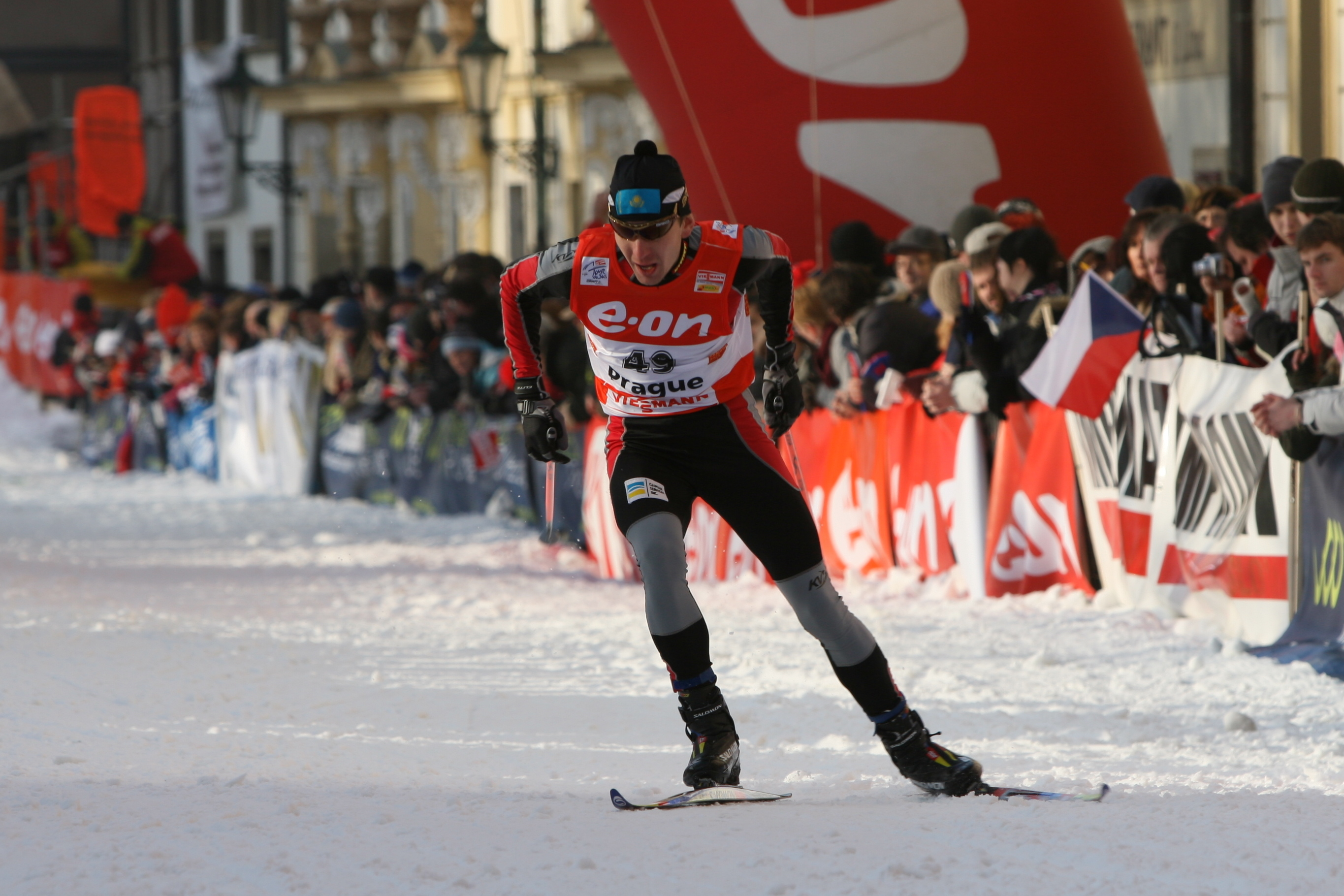
Maxim Odnodvortsev in the qualification of Tour de Ski in Prague

Maksim Odnodvortsev (born 1980) is a cross-country skier from Kazakhstan. He competed at the Winter Olympics in 2002 in Salt Lake City, and in Turin in 2006, placing 9th in the 30 km and 13th in the 50 km.
