= Asian Winter Games =

International multi-sport event

- Official logo of the Games
- Abbreviation: AWG
- Purpose: Multi-sport event for nations on the Asian continent
- Frequency: Every four years
- Inaugurated: 1986 Asian Winter Games in Sapporo, Japan
- Most recent: 2025 Asian Winter Games in Harbin, China
- Next event: 2029 Asian Winter Games in Almaty, Kazakhstan

The Asian Winter Games (AWG) is an international multi-sport event held every four years for members of the Olympic Council of Asia (OCA) featuring winter events. The Japanese Olympic Committee first suggested creating a winter version of the Asian Games in 1982. Their efforts were rewarded when they received hosting rights for the first edition, held in Sapporo in 1986, as the city had the infrastructure and expertise gained from hosting of the 1972 Winter Olympics.

From having only seven OCA member nations participate in the first edition, the number of competing nations in the Winter Asiad has grown consistently. In the 2007 Asian Winter Games in Changchun, 27 out of the 45 members fielded a record number of competitors, while all 45 National Olympic Committees sent delegations for the first time in AWG history.

Although games were considered for Lebanon in 2009, they were ultimately cancelled. The next edition is scheduled to be held in Almaty, Kazakhstan.

== List of Asian Winter Games ==
Host cities of the Asian Winter Games

Edition	Year	Host city	Host nation	Opened by	Start date	End date	Nations	Competitors	Sports	Events	Top-placed team	Ref.
1	1986	Sapporo	Japan	Fahad Al-Ahmed Al-Jaber Al-Sabah (Note: Representing Hirohito, Emperor of Japan.)	1 March	8 March	7	293	7	35	Japan	
2	1990	Sapporo	Japan	Emperor Akihito	9 March	14 March	9	310	6	33	Japan	
3	1996	Harbin	China	President Jiang Zemin	4 February	11 February	17	453	8	43	China	
4	1999	Gangwon	South Korea	President Kim Dae-jung	30 January	6 February	14	798	7	43	China	
5	2003	Aomori	Japan	Crown Prince Naruhito (Note: Representing Akihito, Emperor of Japan.)	1 February	8 February	17	641	11	51	Japan	
6	2007	Changchun	China	President Hu Jintao	28 January	4 February	25	796	10	47	China	
7	2011	Astana and Almaty	Kazakhstan	President Nursultan Nazarbayev	30 January	6 February	26	843	11	69	Kazakhstan	
8	2017	Sapporo	Japan	Crown Prince Naruhito	19 February	26 February	32	1,147	11	64	Japan	
9	2025	Harbin	China	President Xi Jinping	7 February	14 February	34	1,222	11	64	China	
10	2029	Almaty	Kazakhstan	TBD								

- At the 2017 Games, the Olympic Council of Asia invited athletes from Oceania. Two countries from the region (Australia and New Zealand) accepted the invitation and their athletes competed along with 30 NOCs from Asia.

== Sports ==
Sport	Years
Alpine skiing	All
Bandy	2011
Biathlon	All
Cross-country skiing	All
Curling	2003–2007, since 2017
Figure skating	1986, since 1996
Freestyle skiing	1996, since 2003
Ice hockey	All
Short-track speed skating	All
Ski jumping	2003, 2011-2017
Ski mountaineering	2025
Ski orienteering	2011
Snowboarding	2003–2007, since 2017
Speed skating	All

== Medal count ==
As of 2025, the 34 National Olympic Committees have participated throughout the history of the Games. Only China, Japan, and South Korea have won at least one gold medal at every Asian Winter Games, while Japan, China, and Kazakhstan became the only three countries in history to emerge as the first places at the medal tables.

Rank	Nation	Gold	Silver	Bronze	Total
1	Japan (JPN)	148	156	130	434
2	China (CHN)	126	112	131	369
3	South Korea (KOR)	90	98	106	294
4	Kazakhstan (KAZ)	82	71	63	216
5	Uzbekistan (UZB)	2	2	4	8
6	North Korea (PRK)	1	5	12	18
7	Lebanon (LBN)	1	1	0	2
8	Philippines (PHI)	1	0	0	1
9	Mongolia (MGL)	0	1	6	7
10	Iran (IRI)	0	1	2	3
11	Chinese Taipei (TPE)	0	0	1	1
11	Kyrgyzstan (KGZ)	0	0	1	1
11	Thailand (THA)	0	0	1	1
Totals (13 entries)		451	447	457	1,355

== See also ==
- Winter Olympic Games
