= Masaaki Kozu =

Japanese cross-country skier (born 1974)

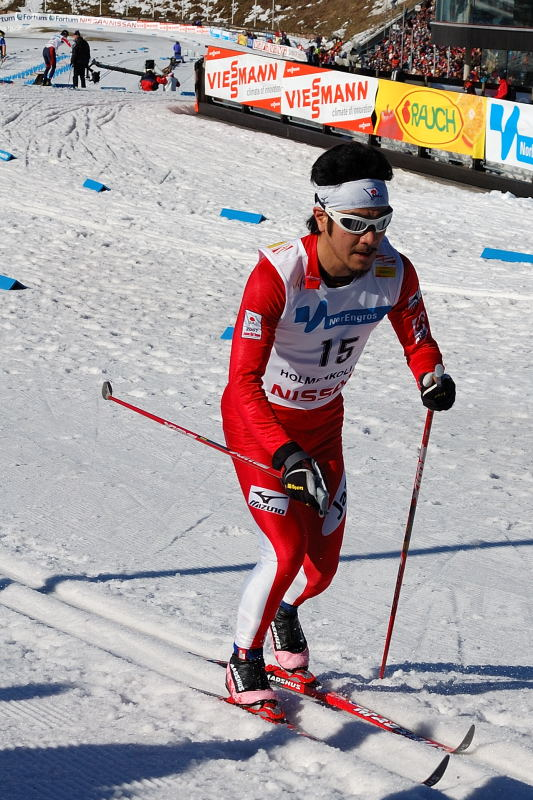
- Masaaki Kozu, Oslo, Norway 2007

Personal information
- Native name: 神津 正昭
- Born: November 19, 1974 (age 50)

Masaaki Kozu (神津 正昭, Kōzu Masaaki) (born November 19, 1974) is a Japanese cross-country skier who has competed since 1993. His best World Cup finish was ninth in a 4 x 10 km relay at Switzerland in 2001.

Kozu also competed in three Winter Olympics, earning his best finish of 12th in the 4 x 10 km relay at Salt Lake City in 2002. His best finish at the FIS Nordic World Ski Championships was ninth in the 4 x 10 km relay at Val di Fiemme in 2003.
