= Thailand at the 2003 Asian Winter Games =

- IOC code: THA
- NOC: National Olympic Committee of Thailand
- Website: www.olympicthai.or.th/eng (in English and Thai)

in Aomori
- Medals Ranked 8th: Gold 0 Silver 0 Bronze 0 Total 0

Asian Winter Games appearances
- 1996; 1999; 2003; 2007; 2011; 2017; 2025; 2029

Thailand participated in the 2003 Asian Winter Games which were held in Aomori, Japan from 1–8 February 2003. It did not win any medals.
