= China at the 2003 Asian Winter Games =

- IOC code: CHN
- NOC: Chinese Olympic Committee external link (in Chinese and English)

in Aomori
- Competitors: 175
- Medals Ranked 3rd: Gold 9 Silver 11 Bronze 13 Total 33

Asian Winter Games appearances
- 1986; 1990; 1996; 1999; 2003; 2007; 2011; 2017; 2025; 2029

China competed in the 2003 Asian Winter Games which were held in Aomori Prefecture, Japan from February 1, 2003 to February 8, 2003. It won 9 gold, 11 silver and 13 bronze medals.

== See also ==
- China at the Asian Games
- China at the Olympics
- Sports in China
