= List of Asian Games medalists in cross-country skiing =

This is the complete list of Asian Winter Games medalists in cross-country skiing from 1986 to 2025.

== Men ==
=== Sprint ===
- Freestyle: 2007
- Classical: 2011–2025

Games	Gold	Silver	Bronze
2007 Changchun	Yuichi Onda (JPN)	Alexey Poltoranin (KAZ)	Yevgeniy Koshevoy (KAZ)
2011 Astana–Almaty	Alexey Poltoranin (KAZ)	Nikolay Chebotko (KAZ)	Yuichi Onda (JPN)
2017 Sapporo	Magnus Kim (KOR)	Sun Qinghai (CHN)	Nobuhito Kashiwabara (JPN)
2025 Harbin	Wang Qiang (CHN)	Konstantin Bortsov (KAZ)	Saimuhaer Sailike (CHN)

=== Team sprint ===
- Freestyle: 2011

Games	Gold	Silver	Bronze
2011 Astana–Almaty	Kazakhstan (KAZ); Alexey Poltoranin; Nikolay Chebotko	Japan (JPN); Masaya Kimura; Nobu Naruse	South Korea (KOR); Park Byung-joo; Jung Eui-myung

=== 10 km ===
- Classical: 1996–2017
- Freestyle: 2025

Games	Gold	Silver	Bronze
1996 Harbin	Pavel Ryabinin (KAZ)	Vladimir Bortsov (KAZ)	Park Byung-chul (KOR)
2003 Aomori	Andrey Golovko (KAZ)	Maxim Odnodvortsev (KAZ)	Dmitriy Yeremenko (KAZ)
2011 Astana–Almaty	Keishin Yoshida (JPN)	Nikolay Chebotko (KAZ)	Alexey Poltoranin (KAZ)
2017 Sapporo	Akira Lenting (JPN)	Magnus Kim (KOR)	Kohei Shimizu (JPN)
2025 Harbin	Haruki Yamashita (JPN)	Takatsugu Uda (JPN)	Olzhas Klimin (KAZ)

=== 15 km ===
- Classical: 1986–1990
- Freestyle: 1996
- Classical: 1999
- Freestyle: 2003–2017

Games	Gold	Silver	Bronze
1986 Sapporo	Kazunari Sasaki (JPN)	Yuji Yamaishi (JPN)	Jun Yeung-hae (KOR)
1990 Sapporo	Kazunari Sasaki (JPN)	Hirofumi Watanabe (JPN)	Hiroyuki Imai (JPN)
1996 Harbin	Pavel Ryabinin (KAZ)	Qu Donghai (CHN)	Vladimir Bortsov (KAZ)
1999 Gangwon	Vladimir Smirnov (KAZ)	Pavel Ryabinin (KAZ)	Andrey Nevzorov (KAZ)
2003 Aomori	Maxim Odnodvortsev (KAZ)	Masaaki Kozu (JPN)	Zhang Chengye (CHN)
2011 Astana–Almaty	Keishin Yoshida (JPN)	Nobu Naruse (JPN)	Nikolay Chebotko (KAZ)
2017 Sapporo	Rinat Mukhin (KAZ)	Naoto Baba (JPN)	Akira Lenting (JPN)

=== 30 km ===
- Freestyle: 1986–2007
- Classical: 2011
- Freestyle: 2017

Games	Gold	Silver	Bronze
1986 Sapporo	Taniyuki Yuki (JPN)	Kazunari Sasaki (JPN)	Jun Yeung-hae (KOR)
1990 Sapporo	Kazunari Sasaki (JPN)	Hiroyuki Imai (JPN)	Hirofumi Watanabe (JPN)
1999 Gangwon	Andrey Nevzorov (KAZ)	Vladimir Smirnov (KAZ)	Mitsuo Horigome (JPN)
2003 Aomori	Maxim Odnodvortsev (KAZ)	Zhang Chengye (CHN)	Dmitriy Yeremenko (KAZ)
2007 Changchun	Maxim Odnodvortsev (KAZ)	Andrey Kondryshev (KAZ)	Katsuhito Ebisawa (JPN)
2007 Changchun	Maxim Odnodvortsev (KAZ)	Andrey Kondryshev (KAZ)	Andrey Golovko (KAZ)
2011 Astana–Almaty	Alexey Poltoranin (KAZ)	Sergey Cherepanov (KAZ)	Keishin Yoshida (JPN)
2017 Sapporo	Akira Lenting (JPN)	Sergey Cherepanov (KAZ)	Nikolay Chebotko (KAZ)

=== 4 × 7.5 km relay ===
- From 1986 to 2011, 4 × 10 km relay

Games	Gold	Silver	Bronze
1986 Sapporo	Japan (JPN); Hirofumi Sokata; Yuji Yamaishi; Taniyuki Yuki; Hidetsugu Sugawara	South Korea (KOR); Cho Sung-hoon; Hong Kun-pyo; Park Ki-ho; Jun Yeung-hae	China (CHN)
1990 Sapporo	Japan (JPN); Hiroyuki Kudo; Hirofumi Watanabe; Masaharu Yamazaki; Kazunari Sasaki	South Korea (KOR); Cho Sung-hoon; Park Ki-ho; Park Byung-chul; Hong Kun-pyo	Mongolia (MGL); Chuluuny Batbold; Ziitsagaany Ganbat; Dambajantsagiin Battulga; Gongoryn Myeryei
1996 Harbin	Kazakhstan (KAZ); Vladimir Bortsov; Samat Musin; Andrey Nevzorov; Pavel Ryabinin	Japan (JPN)	China (CHN)
1999 Gangwon	Kazakhstan (KAZ); Pavel Ryabinin; Igor Zubrilin; Andrey Nevzorov; Vladimir Smirnov	Japan (JPN); Katsuhito Ebisawa; Takeshi Sato; Mitsuo Horigome; Hiroyuki Imai	South Korea (KOR); Park Byung-joo; Park Byung-chul; Shin Doo-sun; Ahn Jin-soo
2003 Aomori	Japan (JPN); Katsuhito Ebisawa; Hiroyuki Imai; Mitsuo Horigome; Masaaki Kozu	Kazakhstan (KAZ); Andrey Golovko; Nikolay Chebotko; Dmitriy Yeremenko; Maxim Odnodvortsev	China (CHN); Li Geliang; Han Dawei; Zhang Chengye; Qu Donghai
2007 Changchun	Kazakhstan (KAZ); Sergey Cherepanov; Andrey Kondryshev; Maxim Odnodvortsev; Nikolay Chebotko	Japan (JPN); Yuichi Onda; Katsuhito Ebisawa; Nobu Naruse; Shohei Honda	China (CHN); Li Geliang; Xia Wan; Bian Wenyou; Wang Songtao
2011 Astana–Almaty	Kazakhstan (KAZ); Sergey Cherepanov; Alexey Poltoranin; Nikolay Chebotko; Yevgeniy Velichko	Japan (JPN); Kohei Shimizu; Keishin Yoshida; Masaya Kimura; Nobu Naruse	South Korea (KOR); Im Yeui-gyu; Ha Tae-bok; Lee Jun-gil; Park Byung-joo
2017 Sapporo	Japan (JPN); Nobuhito Kashiwabara; Kohei Shimizu; Naoto Baba; Akira Lenting	Kazakhstan (KAZ); Sergey Cherepanov; Yerdos Akhmadiyev; Nikolay Chebotko; Rinat Mukhin	South Korea (KOR); Hwang Jun-ho; Park Seong-beom; Kim Min-woo; Magnus Kim
2025 Harbin	China (CHN); Li Minglin; Ciren Zhandui; Bao Lin; Wang Qiang	Japan (JPN); Shota Moriguchi; Takatsugu Uda; Yuito Habuki; Haruki Yamashita	Kazakhstan (KAZ); Konstantin Bortsov; Nail Bashmakov; Olzhas Klimin; Vladislav Kovalyov

== Women ==
=== Sprint ===
- Freestyle: 2007
- Classical: 2011–2025

Games	Gold	Silver	Bronze
2007 Changchun	Wang Chunli (CHN)	Yelena Kolomina (KAZ)	Hou Yuxia (CHN)
2011 Astana–Almaty	Madoka Natsumi (JPN)	Yelena Kolomina (KAZ)	Oxana Yatskaya (KAZ)
2017 Sapporo	Man Dandan (CHN)	Yelena Kolomina (KAZ)	Ju Hye-ri (KOR)
2025 Harbin	Li Lei (CHN)	Meng Honglian (CHN)	Dinigeer Yilamujiang (CHN)

=== Team sprint ===
- Freestyle: 2011

Games	Gold	Silver	Bronze
2011 Astana–Almaty	Kazakhstan (KAZ); Oxana Yatskaya; Yelena Kolomina	China (CHN); Man Dandan; Li Hongxue	Japan (JPN); Naoko Omori; Yuki Kobayashi

=== 5 km ===
- Classical: 1986–2017
- Freestyle: 2025

Games	Gold	Silver	Bronze
1986 Sapporo	Kazuko Nakajima (JPN)	Mihoko Shimizume (JPN)	Tang Yuqin (CHN)
1996 Harbin	Oxana Yatskaya (KAZ)	Sumiko Yokoyama (JPN)	Yelena Chernetsova (KAZ)
1999 Gangwon	Sumiko Yokoyama (JPN)	Svetlana Shishkina (KAZ)	Luan Zhengrong (CHN)
2003 Aomori	Svetlana Malahova-Shishkina (KAZ)	Oxana Yatskaya (KAZ)	Yelena Antonova (KAZ)
2007 Changchun	Oxana Yatskaya (KAZ)	Svetlana Malahova-Shishkina (KAZ)	Wang Chunli (CHN)
2011 Astana–Almaty	Masako Ishida (JPN)	Madoka Natsumi (JPN)	Li Hongxue (CHN)
2017 Sapporo	Yuki Kobayashi (JPN)	Yelena Kolomina (KAZ)	Li Hongxue (CHN)
2025 Harbin	Bayani Jialin (CHN)	Dinigeer Yilamujiang (CHN)	Chi Chunxue (CHN)

=== 10 km ===
- Freestyle: 1986
- Classical: 1990
- Freestyle: 1996–2017

Games	Gold	Silver	Bronze
1986 Sapporo	Kazuko Nakajima (JPN)	Mihoko Shimizume (JPN)	Song Shiji (CHN)
1990 Sapporo	Fumiko Aoki (JPN)	Yoshiko Mikami (JPN)	Ri Kyong-hui (PRK)
1996 Harbin	Sumiko Yokoyama (JPN)	Yu Shumei (CHN)	Guo Dongling (CHN)
1999 Gangwon	Svetlana Shishkina (KAZ)	Sumiko Yokoyama (JPN)	Fumiko Aoki (JPN)
2003 Aomori	Oxana Yatskaya (KAZ)	Svetlana Malahova-Shishkina (KAZ)	Hou Yuxia (CHN)
2011 Astana–Almaty	Lee Chae-won (KOR)	Masako Ishida (JPN)	Yuki Kobayashi (JPN)
2017 Sapporo	Yuki Kobayashi (JPN)	Lee Chae-won (KOR)	Yelena Kolomina (KAZ)

=== 15 km ===
- Freestyle: 1990
- Classical: 2011
- Freestyle: 2017

Games	Gold	Silver	Bronze
1990 Sapporo	Fumiko Aoki (JPN)	Naomi Hoshikawa (JPN)	Wang Jinfen (CHN)
2011 Astana–Almaty	Masako Ishida (JPN)	Yelena Kolomina (KAZ)	Svetlana Malahova-Shishkina (KAZ)
2017 Sapporo	Yuki Kobayashi (JPN)	Lee Chae-won (KOR)	Li Hongxue (CHN)

=== 4 × 5 km relay ===
Games	Gold	Silver	Bronze
1986 Sapporo	China (CHN); Lu Fengmei; Song Shiji; Tang Yuqin; Chang Dezhen	Japan (JPN); Mayumi Ando; Mika Ito; Kazuko Nakajima; Rumiko Yamamoto	North Korea (PRK)
1990 Sapporo	Japan (JPN); Miwa Ota; Fumiko Aoki; Naomi Hoshikawa; Yoshiko Mikami	China (CHN); Song Shiji; Chi Xiumei; Wang Jinfen; Song Aiqin	North Korea (PRK); Han Ok-sil; Ri Kyong-hui; Lim Gun-son; Choi Yong-hwa
1996 Harbin	China (CHN); Guo Dongling; Luan Zhengrong; Wang Jinfen; Yu Shumei	Kazakhstan (KAZ)	Japan (JPN)
1999 Gangwon	Kazakhstan (KAZ); Svetlana Deshevykh; Yelena Kolomina; Olga Selezneva; Svetlana Shishkina	Japan (JPN); Yukino Sato; Sumiko Yokoyama; Kumiko Yokoyama; Fumiko Aoki	China (CHN); Liu Hongxia; Luan Zhengrong; Shi Donghong; Guo Dongling
2003 Aomori	Kazakhstan (KAZ); Yelena Antonova; Oxana Yatskaya; Darya Starostina; Svetlana Malahova-Shishkina	Japan (JPN); Madoka Natsumi; Nobuko Fukuda; Sumiko Yokoyama; Chizuru Soneta	China (CHN); Luan Zhengrong; Hou Yuxia; Li Hongxue; Liu Hongyan
2007 Changchun	Kazakhstan (KAZ); Yelena Kolomina; Yelena Antonova; Oxana Yatskaya; Svetlana Malahova-Shishkina	China (CHN); Wang Chunli; Li Hongxue; Liu Yuanyuan; Hou Yuxia	Japan (JPN); Madoka Natsumi; Masako Ishida; Sumiko Yokoyama; Nobuko Fukuda
2011 Astana–Almaty	Kazakhstan (KAZ); Yelena Kolomina; Oxana Yatskaya; Anastassiya Slonova; Svetlana Malahova-Shishkina	Japan (JPN); Madoka Natsumi; Masako Ishida; Yuki Kobayashi; Michiko Kashiwabara	China (CHN); Man Dandan; Li Hongxue; Li Xin; Liu Yuanyuan
2017 Sapporo	Japan (JPN); Hikari Miyazaki; Kozue Takizawa; Yuki Kobayashi; Chisa Obayashi	China (CHN); Man Dandan; Li Xin; Chi Chunxue; Li Hongxue	South Korea (KOR); Je Sang-mi; Han Da-som; Ju Hye-ri; Lee Chae-won
2025 Harbin	China (CHN); Li Lei; Chi Chunxue; Chen Lingshuang; Dinigeer Yilamujiang	Kazakhstan (KAZ); Xeniya Shalygina; Kamila Yelgazinova; Angelina Shuryga; Nadezhda Stepashkina	Japan (JPN); Mayu Yamamoto; Chika Kobayashi; Yuka Yamazaki; Karen Hatakeyama
