= Cross-country skiing at the 2007 Asian Winter Games =

- Venue: Beida Lake Skiing Resort
- Dates: 30 January – 3 February 2007
- Competitors: 57 from 9 nations

Cross-country skiing at the 2007 Asian Winter Games was held at the Beida Lake Skiing Resort in Changchun, China from 30 January to 3 February 2007.

== Schedule ==
Q	Qualification	F	Final

Event↓/Date →	30th Tue		31st Wed	1st Thu	2nd Fri	3rd Sat
Men's sprint freestyle	Q	F				
Men's 30 km freestyle			F			
Men's 4 × 10 km relay						F
Women's sprint freestyle	Q	F				
Women's 5 km classical			F			
Women's 4 × 5 km relay						F

== Medalists ==
=== Men ===
Event	Gold	Silver	Bronze
Sprint freestyle	Yuichi Onda; Japan	Alexey Poltoranin; Kazakhstan	Yevgeniy Koshevoy; Kazakhstan
30 km freestyle	Maxim Odnodvortsev; Kazakhstan	Andrey Kondryshev; Kazakhstan	Andrey Golovko; Kazakhstan
30 km freestyle	Maxim Odnodvortsev; Kazakhstan	Andrey Kondryshev; Kazakhstan	Katsuhito Ebisawa; Japan
4 × 10 km relay	Kazakhstan; Sergey Cherepanov; Andrey Kondryshev; Maxim Odnodvortsev; Nikolay Chebotko	Japan; Yuichi Onda; Katsuhito Ebisawa; Nobu Naruse; Shohei Honda	China; Li Geliang; Xia Wan; Bian Wenyou; Wang Songtao

=== Women ===
Event	Gold	Silver	Bronze
Sprint freestyle	Wang Chunli; China	Yelena Kolomina; Kazakhstan	Hou Yuxia; China
5 km classical	Oxana Yatskaya; Kazakhstan	Svetlana Malahova-Shishkina; Kazakhstan	Wang Chunli; China
4 × 5 km relay	Kazakhstan; Yelena Kolomina; Yelena Antonova; Oxana Yatskaya; Svetlana Malahova-Shishkina	China; Wang Chunli; Li Hongxue; Liu Yuanyuan; Hou Yuxia	Japan; Madoka Natsumi; Masako Ishida; Sumiko Yokoyama; Nobuko Fukuda

== Medal table ==
Rank	Nation	Gold	Silver	Bronze	Total
1	Kazakhstan (KAZ)	4	4	2	10
2	China (CHN)	1	1	3	5
3	Japan (JPN)	1	1	2	4
Totals (3 entries)		6	6	7	19

== Participating nations ==
A total of 57 athletes from 9 nations competed in cross-country skiing at the 2007 Asian Winter Games:

- China (12)
- India (2)
- Iran (4)
- Japan (9)
- Kazakhstan (12)
- Mongolia (4)
- Nepal (1)
- North Korea (2)
- South Korea (11)
