= Japan at the 1986 Asian Winter Games =

- IOC code: JPN
- NOC: Japanese Olympic Committee
- Website: https://www.joc.or.jp

in Sapporo
- Competitors: 92 (61 men, 31 women)
- Medals Ranked 1st: Gold 29 Silver 23 Bronze 6 Total 58

Asian Winter Games appearances
- 1986; 1990; 1996; 1999; 2003; 2007; 2011; 2017; 2025; 2029

Japan participated and hosted the 1986 Asian Winter Games held in Sapporo, Hokkaidō, Japan from March 1 to March 8, 1986. The country sent a total of 92 athletes to the games, 61 men and 31 women. Japan garnered 29 gold medals securing its top spot in the medal tally.

== Medal table ==
This table is incomplete. You can help by expanding it.

Sport	Gold	Silver	Bronze	Total
Short track speed skating	8	6	1	15
Speed skating	7	5	3	15
Cross-country skiing	5	5	0	10
Alpine skiing	4	3	0	7
Biathlon	3	1	1	5
Figure skating	2	2	1	5
Ice Hockey	0	1	0	1
Totals (7 entries)	29	23	6	58

== Medalists ==
Medal	Name	Sport	Event	Date
Gold	Keiko Asao	Speed skating	Women's 3000 metres	March 4
Gold	Seiko Hashimoto	Speed skating	Women's 1500 metres	March 4
Gold	Seiko Hashimoto	Speed skating	Women's 500 metres	March 4
Gold	Munehisa Kuroiwa	Speed skating	Men's 10000 metres	March 4
Gold	Masahito Shinohara	Speed skating	Men's 5000 metres	March 4
Gold	Yukihiro Mitani	Speed skating	Men's 1500 metres	March 4
Gold	Akira Kuroiwa	Speed skating	Men's 500 metres	March 4
Gold	Naomine Iwaya	Alpine skiing	Men's slalom	March 6
Gold	Tetsuya Okabe	Alpine skiing	Men's giant slalom	March 6
Gold	Sachie Sato	Alpine skiing	Women's slalom	March 6
Gold	Harumi Jin	Alpine skiing	Women's giant slalom	March 6
Gold	Kazuko Nakajima	Cross-country skiing	Women's 5 km classical	March 6
Gold	Kazuko Nakajima	Cross-country skiing	Women's 10 km freestyle	March 6
Gold	Kazunari Sasaki	Cross-country skiing	Men's 15 km classical	March 6
Gold	Taniyuki Yuki	Cross-country skiing	Men's 30 km freestlye	March 6
Gold	Hirofumi Sokata; Yuji Yamaishi; Taniyuki Yuki; Hidetsugu Sugawara	Cross-country skiing	Men's 4 × 10 km relay	March 6
Gold	Eiko Shishii	Short-track speed skating	Women's 3000 metres	March 6
Gold	Mariko Kinoshita	Short-track speed skating	Women's 1500 metres	March 6
Gold	Hiromi Takeuchi	Short-track speed skating	Women's 1000 metres	March 6
Gold	Eiko Shishii	Short-track speed skating	Women's 500 metres	March 6
Gold	Yuichi Akasaka	Short-track speed skating	Men's 3000 metres	March 6
Gold	Toshinobu Kawai	Short-track speed skating	Men's 1500 metres	March 6
Gold	Yuichi Akasaka	Short-track speed skating	Men's 1000 metres	March 6
Gold	Kenichi Sugio	Short-track speed skating	Men's 500 metres	March 6
Gold	Koichi Sato	Biathlon	Men's 10 km sprint	March 7
Gold	Isao Yamase	Biathlon	Men's 20 km individual	March 7
Gold	Koichi Sato; Isao Yamase; Hirohide Sato; Tadashi Nakamura	Biathlon	4 × 7.5 km relay	March 7
Gold	Juri Ozawa	Figure skating	Women's singles	March 8
Gold	Makoto Kano	Figure skating	Men's singles	March 8
Silver	Natsue Seki	Speed skating	Women's 3000 metres	March 4
Silver	Shoko Fusano	Speed skating	Women's 500 metres	March 4
Silver	Toshiaki Imamura	Speed skating	Men's 10000 metres	March 4
Silver	Munehisa Kuroiwa	Speed skating	Men's 1500 metres	March 4
Silver	Makoto Hirose	Speed skating	Men's 1000 metres	March 4
Silver	Chiaki Ishioka	Alpine skiing	Men's giant slalom	March 6
Silver	Waka Okazaki	Alpine skiing	Women's slalom	March 6
Silver	Sachie Sato	Alpine skiing	Women's giant slalom	March 6
Silver	Mihoko Shimizume	Cross-country skiing	Women's 5 km classical	March 6
Silver	Mihoko Shimizume	Cross-country skiing	Women's 10 km freestyle	March 6
Silver	Mayumi Ando; Mika Ito; Kazuko Nakajima; Rumiko Yamamoto	Cross-country skiing	Women's 4 × 5 km relay	March 6
Silver	Yuji Yamaishi	Cross-country skiing	Men's 15 km classical	March 6
Silver	Kazunari Sasaki	Cross-country skiing	Men's 30 km freestlye	March 6
Silver	Hiromi Takeuchi	Short-track speed skating	Women's 1500 metres	March 6
Silver	Yumiko Yamada	Short-track speed skating	Women's 500 metres	March 6
Silver	Tatsuyoshi Ishihara	Short-track speed skating	Men's 3000 metres	March 6
Silver	Tatsuyoshi Ishihara	Short-track speed skating	Men's 1500 metres	March 6
Silver	Tatsuyoshi Ishihara	Short-track speed skating	Men's 1000 metres	March 6
Silver	Toshinobu Kawai	Short-track speed skating	Men's 500 metres	March 6
Silver	Koichi Sato	Biathlon	Men's 20 km individual	March 7
Silver	Takeshi Iwamoto; Atsuo Kudo; Hayato Aoyama; Fumihiko Kajikawa; Yuji Sugai; Kazutoshi Kawamura; Hidekatsu Takagi; Kunio Takagi; Shuji Momoi; Sadaki Honma; Kenji Tanaka; Keiji Takahashi; Yoshio Hoshino; Toshiyuki Yajima; Norio Suzuki; Kazumi Unjo; Koji Wakasa; Toshiyuki Sakai; Takayuki Ueno; Motoki Ebina; Kenichi Suzuki; Masaki Hino	Ice hockey	Men's tournaments	March 8
Silver	Hiroaki Takita; Junko Ito	Figure skating	Ice dancing	March 8
Silver	Masako Kato	Figure skating	Women's singles	March 8
Bronze	Shoko Fusano	Speed skating	Women's 1000 metres	March 4
Bronze	Munehisa Kuroiwa	Speed skating	Men's 5000 metres	March 4
Bronze	Akira Kuroiwa	Speed skating	Men's 1000 metres	March 4
Bronze	Hiromi Takeuchi	Short-track speed skating	Women's 3000 metres	March 6
Bronze	Isao Yamase	Biathlon	Men's 10 km sprint	March 7
Bronze	Kenji Takino; Kaoru Takino	Figure skating	Ice dancing	March 8

Demonstration sports

Medal	Name	Sport	Event	Date
Gold	Jun Shibuya	Ski jumping	Men's large hill	March 2
Silver	Sadao Shimizu	Ski jumping	Men's large hill	March 2
Bronze	Masahiko Takahashi	Ski jumping	Men's large hill	March 2
