= Cross-country skiing at the 1986 Asian Winter Games =

- Venue: Nishioka Park
- Dates: 2–6 March 1986

Cross-country skiing at the 1986 Asian Winter Games took place in the city of Sapporo, Japan with six events contested — three each for men and women.

== Medalists ==
=== Men ===
Event	Gold	Silver	Bronze
15 km classical	Kazunari Sasaki; Japan	Yuji Yamaishi; Japan	Jun Yeung-hae; South Korea
30 km freestyle	Taniyuki Yuki; Japan	Kazunari Sasaki; Japan	Jun Yeung-hae; South Korea
4 × 10 km relay	Japan; Hirofumi Sokata; Yuji Yamaishi; Taniyuki Yuki; Hidetsugu Sugawara	South Korea; Cho Sung-hoon; Hong Kun-pyo; Park Ki-ho; Jun Yeung-hae	China; Kang Henglin; Zhu Dianfa

=== Women ===
Event	Gold	Silver	Bronze
5 km classical	Kazuko Nakajima; Japan	Mihoko Shimizume; Japan	Tang Yuqin; China
10 km freestyle	Kazuko Nakajima; Japan	Mihoko Shimizume; Japan	Song Shiji; China
4 × 5 km relay	China; Lu Fengmei; Song Shiji; Tang Yuqin; Chang Dezhen	Japan; Mayumi Ando; Mika Ito; Kazuko Nakajima; Rumiko Yamamoto	North Korea; Ri Kyong-hui; Kim Jong-hui

== Medal table ==
Rank	Nation	Gold	Silver	Bronze	Total
1	Japan (JPN)	5	5	0	10
2	China (CHN)	1	0	3	4
3	South Korea (KOR)	0	1	2	3
4	North Korea (PRK)	0	0	1	1
Totals (4 entries)		6	6	6	18
