= Cross-country skiing at the 2007 Asian Winter Games – Men's 4 × 10 kilometre relay =

Men's 4 × 10 kilometre relay at the 2007 Asian Winter Games
- Venue: Beida Lake Skiing Resort
- Dates: 3 February 2007
- Competitors: 20 from 5 nations

Medalists
| gold medal | Kazakhstan; Sergey Cherepanov, Andrey Kondryshev, Maxim Odnodvortsev, Nikolay Chebotko |
| silver medal | Japan; Yuichi Onda, Katsuhito Ebisawa, Nobu Naruse, Shohei Honda |
| bronze medal | China; Li Geliang, Xia Wan, Bian Wenyou, Wang Songtao |

The men's 4 × 10 kilometre relay at the 2007 Asian Winter Games was held on February 3, 2007, at Beida Lake Skiing Resort, China.

== Schedule ==
All times are China Standard Time (UTC+08:00)

| Date | Time | Event |
|---|---|---|
| Saturday, 3 February 2007 | 12:00 | Final |

== Results ==
| Rank | Team | Time |
|---|---|---|
| 1st place, gold medalist(s) | Kazakhstan (KAZ) | 1:55:46.3 |
| | Sergey Cherepanov | 29:36.7 |
| | Andrey Kondryshev | 30:32.9 |
| | Maxim Odnodvortsev | 27:26.5 |
| | Nikolay Chebotko | 28:10.2 |
| 2nd place, silver medalist(s) | Japan (JPN) | 2:00:40.6 |
| | Yuichi Onda | 30:32.9 |
| | Katsuhito Ebisawa | 31:42.8 |
| | Nobu Naruse | 28:26.1 |
| | Shohei Honda | 29:58.8 |
| 3rd place, bronze medalist(s) | China (CHN) | 2:03:20.0 |
| | Li Geliang | 31:10.7 |
| | Xia Wan | 31:37.7 |
| | Bian Wenyou | 30:00.1 |
| | Wang Songtao | 30:31.5 |
| 4 | South Korea (KOR) | 2:07:13.1 |
| | Choi Im-heon | 32:33.4 |
| | Hong Jin-ho | 34:22.1 |
| | Kim Hak-jin | 30:06.5 |
| | Jung Eui-myung | 30:11.1 |
| 5 | Iran (IRI) | 2:24:22.8 |
| | Sattar Seid | 38:26.1 |
| | Ahmad Kavian | 38:06.8 |
| | Hossein Saveh-Shemshaki | 34:46.8 |
| | Mostafa Mirhashemi | 33:03.1 |
