= Cross-country skiing at the 1996 Asian Winter Games – Women's 10 kilometre freestyle =

Asian winter games discipline in 1996

Women's 10 kilometre freestyle at the 1996 Asian Winter Games
- Venue: Yabuli Ski Resort
- Dates: 6 February 1996
- Competitors: 13 from 4 nations

Medalists
gold medal	Sumiko Yokoyama	Japan
silver medal	Yu Shumei	China
bronze medal	Guo Dongling	China

The women's 10 kilometre interval start freestyle at the 1996 Asian Winter Games was held on 6 February 1996 at Yabuli Ski Resort, China.

== Results ==
Rank	Athlete	Time
1st place, gold medalist(s)	Sumiko Yokoyama (JPN)	30:14.0
2nd place, silver medalist(s)	Yu Shumei (CHN)	30:16.0
3rd place, bronze medalist(s)	Guo Dongling (CHN)	31:23.6
4	Wang Jinfen (CHN)	31:33.1
5	Luan Zhengrong (CHN)	32:00.1
6	Oxana Yatskaya (KAZ)	32:09.6
7	Midori Furusawa (JPN)	32:35.5
8	Kanoko Goto (JPN)	32:48.1
9	Yuko Takeda (JPN)	33:02.4
10	Yelena Antonova (KAZ)	33:04.4
11	Svetlana Shishkina (KAZ)	33:05.0
12	Yelena Chernetsova (KAZ)	33:29.5
13	Yun Hwa-ja (KOR)	33:39.7
