= Cross-country skiing at the 2003 Asian Winter Games – Women's 4 × 5 kilometre relay =

Women's 4 × 5 kilometre relay at the 2003 Asian Winter Games
- Venue: Ajara Athletic Park
- Dates: 6 February 2003
- Competitors: 12 from 3 nations

Medalists
gold medal	Kazakhstan; Yelena Antonova, Oxana Yatskaya, Darya Starostina, Svetlana Malahova-Shishkina
silver medal	Japan; Madoka Natsumi, Nobuko Fukuda, Sumiko Yokoyama, Chizuru Soneta
bronze medal	China; Luan Zhengrong, Hou Yuxia, Li Hongxue, Liu Hongyan

The women's 4 × 5 kilometre relay at the 2003 Asian Winter Games was held on February 6, 2003 at Ajara Athletic Park, Japan.

== Schedule ==
All times are Japan Standard Time (UTC+09:00)

Date	Time	Event
Thursday, 6 February 2003	10:00	Final

== Results ==
Rank	Team	Time
1st place, gold medalist(s)	Kazakhstan (KAZ)	58:46.9
	Yelena Antonova	15:42.2
	Oxana Yatskaya	14:48.0
	Darya Starostina	14:21.2
	Svetlana Malahova-Shishkina	13:55.5
2nd place, silver medalist(s)	Japan (JPN)	1:00:03.0
	Madoka Natsumi	15:45.7
	Nobuko Fukuda	15:28.3
	Sumiko Yokoyama	14:25.1
	Chizuru Soneta	14:23.9
3rd place, bronze medalist(s)	China (CHN)	1:01:25.6
	Luan Zhengrong	16:01.4
	Hou Yuxia	15:30.1
	Li Hongxue	14:30.1
	Liu Hongyan	15:24.0
