= Cross-country skiing at the 1996 Asian Winter Games – Women's 5 kilometre classical =

Asian winter games discipline in 1996

Women's 5 kilometre classical at the 1996 Asian Winter Games
- Venue: Yabuli Ski Resort
- Dates: 11 February 1996
- Competitors: 14 from 4 nations

Medalists
gold medal	Oxana Yatskaya	Kazakhstan
silver medal	Sumiko Yokoyama	Japan
bronze medal	Yelena Chernetsova	Kazakhstan

The women's 5 kilometre interval start classical at the 1996 Asian Winter Games was held on 11 February 1996 at Yabuli Ski Resort, China.

== Results ==
Rank	Athlete	Time
1st place, gold medalist(s)	Oxana Yatskaya (KAZ)	16:24.5
2nd place, silver medalist(s)	Sumiko Yokoyama (JPN)	16:44.4
3rd place, bronze medalist(s)	Yelena Chernetsova (KAZ)	16:58.1
4	Guo Dongling (CHN)	17:06.0
5	Luan Zhengrong (CHN)	17:30.9
6	Midori Furusawa (JPN)	17:42.5
7	Yuko Takeda (JPN)	17:49.9
8	Svetlana Shishkina (KAZ)	17:50.1
9	Yu Shumei (CHN)	18:03.5
10	Liu Hongxia (CHN)	18:16.8
11	Olga Selezneva (KAZ)	18:20.2
12	Kanoko Goto (JPN)	18:44.3
13	Yun Hwa-ja (KOR)	18:51.3
14	Kim Yoo-jin (KOR)	19:21.3
