= Cross-country skiing at the 2007 Asian Winter Games – Men's 30 kilometre freestyle =

Men's 30 kilometre freestyle at the 2007 Asian Winter Games
- Venue: Beida Lake Skiing Resort
- Dates: 31 January 2007
- Competitors: 24 from 9 nations

Medalists
gold medal	Maxim Odnodvortsev	Kazakhstan
silver medal	Andrey Kondryshev	Kazakhstan
bronze medal	Andrey Golovko	Kazakhstan
bronze medal	Katsuhito Ebisawa	Japan

The men's 30 kilometre freestyle at the 2007 Asian Winter Games was held on January 31, 2007, at Beida Lake Skiing Resort, China.

== Schedule ==
All times are China Standard Time (UTC+08:00)

Date	Time	Event
Wednesday, 31 January 2007	12:00	Final

== Results ==
Legend

- DNF — Did not finish

Rank	Athlete	Time
1st place, gold medalist(s)	Maxim Odnodvortsev (KAZ)	1:22:44.0
2nd place, silver medalist(s)	Andrey Kondryshev (KAZ)	1:24:05.0
3rd place, bronze medalist(s)	Andrey Golovko (KAZ)	1:24:32.0
3rd place, bronze medalist(s)	Katsuhito Ebisawa (JPN)	1:25:28.0
5	Nikolay Chebotko (KAZ)	1:26:49.0
6	Li Geliang (CHN)	1:27:17.0
7	Shunsuke Komamura (JPN)	1:28:28.0
8	Shohei Honda (JPN)	1:29:17.0
9	Shin Doo-sun (KOR)	1:32:39.0
10	Nobu Naruse (JPN)	1:32:53.0
11	Bian Wenyou (CHN)	1:33:06.0
12	Han Dawei (CHN)	1:33:14.0
13	Kim Jeong-min (KOR)	1:36:32.0
14	Bahadur Gupta (IND)	1:40:17.0
15	Sin Kyong-il (PRK)	1:41:58.0
16	Tashi Lundup (IND)	1:43:51.0
17	Mostafa Mirhashemi (IRI)	1:45:09.0
18	Dachhiri Sherpa (NEP)	1:49:18.0
19	Hossein Saveh-Shemshaki (IRI)	1:52:25.0
20	Amarjargalyn Temüüjin (MGL)	1:57:08.0
—	Xia Wan (CHN)	DNF
—	Ahmad Kavian (IRI)	DNF
—	Jung Eui-myung (KOR)	DNF
—	Jambalsürengiin Enkhselenge (MGL)	DNF

- Katsuhito Ebisawa was awarded bronze because of no three-medal sweep per country rule.
