= Cross-country skiing at the 2007 Asian Winter Games – Men's sprint freestyle =

Men's sprint freestyle at the 2007 Asian Winter Games
- Venue: Beida Lake Skiing Resort
- Dates: 30 January 2007
- Competitors: 26 from 9 nations

Medalists
gold medal	Yuichi Onda	Japan
silver medal	Alexey Poltoranin	Kazakhstan
bronze medal	Yevgeniy Koshevoy	Kazakhstan

The men's sprint freestyle at the 2007 Asian Winter Games was held on January 30, 2007, at Beida Lake Skiing Resort, China.

== Schedule ==
All times are China Standard Time (UTC+08:00)

Date	Time	Event
Tuesday, 30 January 2007	13:30	Qualification
Tuesday, 30 January 2007	14:50	1/4 finals
Tuesday, 30 January 2007	15:20	Semifinals
Tuesday, 30 January 2007	15:45	Finals

== Results ==
=== Qualification ===
Rank	Athlete	Time
1	Nikolay Chebotko (KAZ)	2:36.79
2	Shunsuke Komamura (JPN)	2:37.46
3	Nobu Naruse (JPN)	2:38.31
4	Sergey Cherepanov (KAZ)	2:38.63
5	Alexey Poltoranin (KAZ)	2:38.88
6	Yevgeniy Koshevoy (KAZ)	2:40.23
7	Yuichi Onda (JPN)	2:40.55
8	Jung Eui-myung (KOR)	2:42.20
9	Kim Hak-jin (KOR)	2:43.09
10	Xia Wan (CHN)	2:44.56
11	Sun Qinghai (CHN)	2:45.82
12	Shohei Honda (JPN)	2:45.96
13	Li Geliang (CHN)	2:46.23
14	Wang Songtao (CHN)	2:46.38
15	Shin Doo-sun (KOR)	2:47.15
16	Sin Kyong-il (PRK)	2:57.83
17	Kim Dong-hyun (KOR)	2:58.68
18	Bahadur Gupta (IND)	3:09.14
19	Jambalsürengiin Enkhselenge (MGL)	3:12.37
20	Mostafa Mirhashemi (IRI)	3:12.81
21	Hossein Saveh-Shemshaki (IRI)	3:13.03
22	Ahmad Kavian (IRI)	3:15.86
23	Tashi Lundup (IND)	3:20.40
24	Sattar Seid (IRI)	3:22.60
25	Amarjargalyn Temüüjin (MGL)	3:24.92
26	Dachhiri Sherpa (NEP)	3:28.30

=== 1/4 finals ===
==== Heat 1 ====
Rank	Athlete	Time
1	Nikolay Chebotko (KAZ)	2:32.9
2	Kim Hak-jin (KOR)	2:33.2
3	Jung Eui-myung (KOR)	2:40.5
4	Sin Kyong-il (PRK)	2:46.4

==== Heat 2 ====
Rank	Athlete	Time
1	Alexey Poltoranin (KAZ)	2:28.9
2	Sergey Cherepanov (KAZ)	2:29.3
3	Shohei Honda (JPN)	2:29.9
4	Li Geliang (CHN)	2:30.1

==== Heat 3 ====
Rank	Athlete	Time
1	Yuichi Onda (JPN)	2:32.5
2	Shunsuke Komamura (JPN)	2:33.3
3	Xia Wan (CHN)	2:34.4
4	Shin Doo-sun (KOR)	2:45.2

==== Heat 4 ====
Rank	Athlete	Time
1	Yevgeniy Koshevoy (KAZ)	2:33.4
2	Nobu Naruse (JPN)	2:33.8
3	Wang Songtao (CHN)	2:34.3
4	Sun Qinghai (CHN)	2:37.6

=== Semifinals ===
==== Heat 1 ====
Rank	Athlete	Time
1	Nikolay Chebotko (KAZ)	2:29.6
2	Alexey Poltoranin (KAZ)	2:30.4
3	Kim Hak-jin (KOR)	2:32.8
4	Sergey Cherepanov (KAZ)	2:33.4

==== Heat 2 ====
Rank	Athlete	Time
1	Yuichi Onda (JPN)	2:26.8
2	Yevgeniy Koshevoy (KAZ)	2:26.9
3	Nobu Naruse (JPN)	2:27.5
4	Shunsuke Komamura (JPN)	2:31.2

=== Finals ===
==== Final B ====
Rank	Athlete	Time
1	Sergey Cherepanov (KAZ)	
2	Nobu Naruse (JPN)	
3	Shunsuke Komamura (JPN)	
4	Kim Hak-jin (KOR)	

==== Final A ====
Rank	Athlete	Time
1st place, gold medalist(s)	Yuichi Onda (JPN)	
2nd place, silver medalist(s)	Alexey Poltoranin (KAZ)	
3rd place, bronze medalist(s)	Yevgeniy Koshevoy (KAZ)	
4	Nikolay Chebotko (KAZ)	
