= Cross-country skiing at the 1999 Asian Winter Games – Women's 10 kilometre freestyle =

Women's 10 kilometre freestyle at the 1999 Asian Winter Games
- Venue: Provincial Nordic Venue
- Dates: 5 February 1999
- Competitors: 15 from 4 nations

Medalists
gold medal	Svetlana Shishkina	Kazakhstan
silver medal	Sumiko Yokoyama	Japan
bronze medal	Fumiko Aoki	Japan

The women's 10 kilometre freestyle at the 1999 Asian Winter Games was held on February 5, 1999 at Yongpyong Cross Country Venue, South Korea.

== Schedule ==
All times are Korea Standard Time (UTC+09:00)

Date	Time	Event
Friday, 5 February 1999	10:00	Final

== Results ==
Rank	Athlete	Time
1st place, gold medalist(s)	Svetlana Shishkina (KAZ)	27:02.8
2nd place, silver medalist(s)	Sumiko Yokoyama (JPN)	27:15.3
3rd place, bronze medalist(s)	Fumiko Aoki (JPN)	27:40.5
4	Midori Furusawa (JPN)	27:57.0
5	Yelena Kolomina (KAZ)	28:12.2
6	Svetlana Deshevykh (KAZ)	28:25.5
7	Luan Zhengrong (CHN)	28:32.1
8	Lee Chun-ja (KOR)	28:55.5
9	Olga Selezneva (KAZ)	29:16.7
10	Shi Donghong (CHN)	29:38.0
11	Yun Hwa-ja (KOR)	29:47.3
12	Guo Dongling (CHN)	30:02.5
13	Han Jung-ja (KOR)	31:17.2
14	Liu Hongxia (CHN)	31:34.3
15	Yoon Myun-jung (KOR)	31:37.2
