= Cross-country skiing at the 1999 Asian Winter Games =

- Venue: Provincial Nordic Venue
- Dates: 31 January – 5 February 1999
- Competitors: 49 from 7 nations

Cross-country skiing at the 1999 Asian Winter Games took place in the Provincial Nordic venue, around the resort town of Yongpyong, Kangwon, South Korea, with six events contested — three each for men and women.

== Schedule ==
F	Final

Event↓/Date →	31st Sun	1st Mon	2nd Tue	3rd Wed	4th Thu	5th Fri
Men's 15 km classical	F					
Men's 30 km freestyle					F	
Men's 4 × 10 km relay			F			
Women's 5 km classical		F				
Women's 10 km freestyle						F
Women's 4 × 5 km relay				F		

== Medalists ==
=== Men ===
Event	Gold	Silver	Bronze
15 km classical	Vladimir Smirnov; Kazakhstan	Pavel Ryabinin; Kazakhstan	Andrey Nevzorov; Kazakhstan
30 km freestyle	Andrey Nevzorov; Kazakhstan	Vladimir Smirnov; Kazakhstan	Mitsuo Horigome; Japan
4 × 10 km relay	Kazakhstan; Pavel Ryabinin; Igor Zubrilin; Andrey Nevzorov; Vladimir Smirnov	Japan; Katsuhito Ebisawa; Takeshi Sato; Mitsuo Horigome; Hiroyuki Imai	South Korea; Park Byung-joo; Park Byung-chul; Shin Doo-sun; Ahn Jin-soo

=== Women ===
Event	Gold	Silver	Bronze
5 km classical	Sumiko Yokoyama; Japan	Svetlana Shishkina; Kazakhstan	Luan Zhengrong; China
10 km freestyle	Svetlana Shishkina; Kazakhstan	Sumiko Yokoyama; Japan	Fumiko Aoki; Japan
4 × 5 km relay	Kazakhstan; Svetlana Deshevykh; Yelena Kolomina; Olga Selezneva; Svetlana Shishkina	Japan; Yukino Sato; Sumiko Yokoyama; Kumiko Yokoyama; Fumiko Aoki	China; Liu Hongxia; Luan Zhengrong; Shi Donghong; Guo Dongling

== Medal table ==
Rank	Nation	Gold	Silver	Bronze	Total
1	Kazakhstan (KAZ)	5	3	1	9
2	Japan (JPN)	1	3	2	6
3	China (CHN)	0	0	2	2
4	South Korea (KOR)	0	0	1	1
Totals (4 entries)		6	6	6	18

== Participating nations ==
A total of 49 athletes from 7 nations competed in cross-country skiing at the 1999 Asian Winter Games:

- China (8)
- India (4)
- Iran (4)
- Japan (9)
- Kazakhstan (10)
- Mongolia (5)
- South Korea (9)
