= Cross-country skiing at the 2007 Asian Winter Games – Women's 4 × 5 kilometre relay =

Women's 4 × 5 kilometre relay at the 2007 Asian Winter Games
- Venue: Beida Lake Skiing Resort
- Dates: 3 February 2007
- Competitors: 16 from 4 nations

Medalists
gold medal	Kazakhstan; Yelena Kolomina, Yelena Antonova, Oxana Yatskaya, Svetlana Malahova-Shishkina
silver medal	China; Wang Chunli, Li Hongxue, Liu Yuanyuan, Hou Yuxia
bronze medal	Japan; Madoka Natsumi, Masako Ishida, Sumiko Yokoyama, Nobuko Fukuda

The women's 4 × 5 kilometre relay at the 2007 Asian Winter Games was held on February 3, 2007, at Beida Lake Skiing Resort, China.

== Schedule ==
All times are China Standard Time (UTC+08:00)

Date	Time	Event
Saturday, 3 February 2007	10:00	Final

== Results ==
Rank	Team	Time
1st place, gold medalist(s)	Kazakhstan (KAZ)	1:04:42.2
	Yelena Kolomina	16:34.1
	Yelena Antonova	16:56.6
	Oxana Yatskaya	15:54.2
	Svetlana Malahova-Shishkina	15:17.3
2nd place, silver medalist(s)	China (CHN)	1:06:25.4
	Wang Chunli	16:42.6
	Li Hongxue	17:23.8
	Liu Yuanyuan	15:47.0
	Hou Yuxia	16:32.0
3rd place, bronze medalist(s)	Japan (JPN)	1:07:29.4
	Madoka Natsumi	17:28.4
	Masako Ishida	17:07.0
	Sumiko Yokoyama	16:04.8
	Nobuko Fukuda	16:49.2
4	South Korea (KOR)	1:14:03.5
	Lee Chae-won	17:43.0
	Kim Young-hee	19:43.5
	Bae Ji-young	18:36.8
	Kyung In-hwa	18:00.2
