= Cross-country skiing at the 1988 Winter Olympics – Men's 50 kilometre freestyle =

Men's 50 kilometre freestyle at the XV Olympic Winter Games
- Venue: Canmore Nordic Centre Provincial Park
- Dates: 27 February 1988
- Competitors: 71 from 23 nations
- Winning time: 2:04:30.9

Medalists
| 1st place, gold medalist(s) | | Gunde Svan; Sweden |
| 2nd place, silver medalist(s) | | Maurilio De Zolt; Italy |
| 3rd place, bronze medalist(s) | | Andreas Grünenfelder; Switzerland |

The men's 50 kilometre freestyle cross-country skiing competition at the 1988 Winter Olympics in Calgary, Canada, was held on 27 February 1988 at the Canmore Nordic Centre.

Each skier started at half a minute intervals, skiing the entire 50 kilometre course. Maurilio De Zolt of Italy was the 1987 World champion and Thomas Wassberg was the defending champion from the 1984 Olympics in Sarajevo, Yugoslavia.

== Results ==
| Rank | Bib | Name | Country | Time | Deficit |
|---|---|---|---|---|---|
| 1st place, gold medalist(s) | 69 | Gunde Svan | Sweden | 2:04:30.9 | – |
| 2nd place, silver medalist(s) | 64 | Maurilio De Zolt | Italy | 2:05:36.4 | +1:05.5 |
| 3rd place, bronze medalist(s) | 31 | Andi Grünenfelder | Switzerland | 2:06:01.9 | +1:31.0 |
| 4 | 40 | Vegard Ulvang | Norway | 2:06:32.3 | +2:01.4 |
| 5 | 22 | Holger Bauroth | East Germany | 2:07:02.4 | +2:31.5 |
| 6 | 20 | Jan Ottosson | Sweden | 2:07:34.8 | +3:03.9 |
| 7 | 37 | Kari Ristanen | Finland | 2:08:08.1 | +3:37.2 |
| 8 | 38 | Uwe Bellmann | East Germany | 2:08:18.6 | +3:47.7 |
| 9 | 6 | Pål Gunnar Mikkelsplass | Norway | 2:08:20.0 | +3:49.1 |
| 10 | 58 | Gianfranco Polvara | Italy | 2:08:40.3 | +4:09.4 |
| 11 | 57 | Torgeir Bjørn | Norway | 2:08:41.0 | +4:10.1 |
| 12 | 17 | Vladimir Sakhnov | Soviet Union | 2:09:00.1 | +4:29.2 |
| 13 | 16 | Giachem Guidon | Switzerland | 2:09:02.2 | +4:31.3 |
| 14 | 55 | Jeremias Wigger | Switzerland | 2:09:05.3 | +4:34.4 |
| 15 | 35 | Ladislav Švanda | Czechoslovakia | 2:09:08.1 | +4:37.2 |
| 16 | 41 | Albert Walder | Italy | 2:09:19.6 | +4:48.7 |
| 17 | 47 | Claude Pierrat | France | 2:09:54.9 | +5:24.0 |
| 18 | 12 | Fausto Bormetti | Italy | 2:10:20.7 | +5:49.8 |
| 19 | 56 | Andre Blatter | Austria | 2:10:43.6 | +6:12.7 |
| 20 | 5 | Radim Nyč | Czechoslovakia | 2:10:46.3 | +6:15.4 |
| 21 | 43 | Pierre Harvey | Canada | 2:10:54.8 | +6:23.9 |
| 22 | 59 | Harri Kirvesniemi | Finland | 2:11:41.8 | +7:10.9 |
| 23 | 54 | Petr Lisičan | Czechoslovakia | 2:11:44.4 | +7:13.5 |
| 24 | 2 | Guy Balland | France | 2:11:58.7 | +7:27.8 |
| 25 | 51 | Mikhail Devyatyarov | Soviet Union | 2:12:01.7 | +7:30.8 |
| 26 | 72 | Yuri Burlakov | Soviet Union | 2:12:02.2 | +7:31.3 |
| 27 | 65 | Pavel Benc | Czechoslovakia | 2:12:08.4 | +7:37.5 |
| 28 | 48 | Torgny Mogren | Sweden | 2:12:20.2 | +7:49.3 |
| 29 | 10 | Heikki Kivikko | Finland | 2:12:27.1 | +7:56.2 |
| 30 | 11 | Janež Kršinar | Yugoslavia | 2:12:33.5 | +8:02.6 |
| 31 | 70 | Tor Håkon Holte | Norway | 2:12:56.6 | +8:25.7 |
| 32 | 50 | Kazunari Sasaki | Japan | 2:13:09.6 | +8:38.7 |
| 33 | 49 | Herbert Fritzenwenger | West Germany | 2:13:27.6 | +8:56.7 |
| 34 | 44 | Georg Fischer | West Germany | 2:13:31.3 | +9:00.4 |
| 35 | 74 | Markus Fähndrich | Switzerland | 2:13:33.2 | +9:02.3 |
| 36 | 71 | Johann Standmann | Austria | 2:13:39.3 | +9:08.4 |
| 37 | 68 | Dominique Locatelli | France | 2:13:56.8 | +9:25.9 |
| 38 | 36 | Alexey Prokourorov | Soviet Union | 2:14:01.0 | +9:30.1 |
| 39 | 28 | Tanayuki Yuki | Japan | 2:16:24.7 | +11:53.8 |
| 40 | 52 | Atanas Simidchev | Bulgaria | 2:17:02.4 | +12:31.5 |
| 41 | 42 | Alois Schwarz | Austria | 2:17:03.5 | +12:32.6 |
| 42 | 3 | Atsushi Egawa | Japan | 2:17:52.8 | +13:21.9 |
| 43 | 23 | Dennis Lawrence | Canada | 2:17:55.7 | +13:24.8 |
| 44 | 8 | Einar Ólafsson | Iceland | 2:18:21.9 | +13:51.0 |
| 45 | 66 | Antti Ticklen | Finland | 2:18:41.8 | +14:10.9 |
| 46 | 53 | Alain Masson | Canada | 2:19:21.7 | +14:50.8 |
| 47 | 14 | Kevin Brochman | United States | 2:19:45.5 | +15:14.6 |
| 48 | 32 | Young Hae-Jun | South Korea | 2:20:50.8 | +16:19.9 |
| 49 | 61 | Wayne Dustin | Canada | 2:21:31.8 | +17:00.9 |
| 50 | 15 | Ki Ho Park | South Korea | 2:22:36.4 | +18:05.5 |
| 51 | 46 | Kun Pyo Hong | South Korea | 2:23:13.6 | +18:42.7 |
| 52 | 33 | Sašo Grajf | Yugoslavia | 2:23:47.1 | +19:16.2 |
| 53 | 26 | Jordi Ribó | Spain | 2:24:10.4 | +19:39.5 |
| 54 | 25 | Martin Watkins | Great Britain | 2:24:48.3 | +20:17.4 |
| 55 | 18 | Ewan MacKenzie | Great Britain | 2:24:58.2 | +20:27.3 |
| 56 | 63 | Bill Spencer | United States | 2:25:22.6 | +20:51.7 |
| 57 | 4 | Zidtsagaany Ganbat | Mongolia | 2:26:22.0 | +21:51.1 |
| 58 | 21 | José Giro | Spain | 2:27:05.8 | +22:34.9 |
| 59 | 19 | Julio Moreschi | Argentina | 2:28:36.5 | +24:05.6 |
| 60 | 45 | Dambajantsagiin Battulga | Mongolia | 2:30:33.7 | +26:02.8 |
| 61 | 7 | Roberto Alvárez | Mexico | 3:22:25.1 | +1:17:54.2 |
| | 1 | Alois Stadlober | Austria | DNF | |
| | 13 | Walter Kuss | West Germany | DNF | |
| | 24 | Todor Makhov | Bulgaria | DNF | |
| | 27 | Mano Ketenzhiev | Bulgaria | DNF | |
| | 29 | Jean-Luc Thomas | France | DNF | |
| | 30 | Dan Simoneau | United States | DNF | |
| | 39 | Thomas Wassberg | Sweden | DNF | |
| | 60 | Jon Engen | United States | DNF | |
| | 67 | Park Byung-woo | South Korea | DNF | |
| | 9 | Konstantin Ritter | Liechtenstein | DNS | |
| | 34 | David Hislop | Australia | DNS | |
| | 62 | Masaharu Yamazaki | Japan | DNS | |
| | 73 | Milush Ivanchev | Bulgaria | DNS | |
