= Cross-country skiing at the 1999 Asian Winter Games – Women's 4 × 5 kilometre relay =

Women's 4 × 5 kilometre relay at the 1999 Asian Winter Games
- Venue: Provincial Nordic Venue
- Dates: 3 February 1999
- Competitors: 16 from 4 nations

Medalists
gold medal	Kazakhstan; Svetlana Deshevykh, Yelena Kolomina, Olga Selezneva, Svetlana Shishkina
silver medal	Japan; Yukino Sato, Sumiko Yokoyama, Kumiko Yokoyama, Fumiko Aoki
bronze medal	China; Liu Hongxia, Luan Zhengrong, Shi Donghong, Guo Dongling

The women's 4 × 5 kilometre relay at the 1999 Asian Winter Games was held on February 3, 1999 at Yongpyong Cross Country Venue, South Korea.

== Schedule ==
All times are Korea Standard Time (UTC+09:00)

Date	Time	Event
Wednesday, 3 February 1999	10:00	Final

== Results ==
Rank	Team	Time
1st place, gold medalist(s)	Kazakhstan (KAZ)	57:29.4
	Svetlana Deshevykh	15:12.7
	Yelena Kolomina	14:35.9
	Olga Selezneva	14:18.3
	Svetlana Shishkina	13:22.5
2nd place, silver medalist(s)	Japan (JPN)	57:38.1
	Yukino Sato	15:29.6
	Sumiko Yokoyama	14:20.0
	Kumiko Yokoyama	14:15.0
	Fumiko Aoki	13:33.5
3rd place, bronze medalist(s)	China (CHN)	1:00:15.9
	Liu Hongxia	16:09.9
	Luan Zhengrong	14:24.7
	Shi Donghong	14:45.6
	Guo Dongling	14:55.7
4	South Korea (KOR)	1:02:21.4
	Yun Hwa-ja	16:10.9
	Yoon Myun-jung	16:06.0
	Lee Chun-ja	14:44.6
	Han Jung-ja	15:19.9
