= Cross-country skiing at the 1999 Asian Winter Games – Women's 5 kilometre classical =

Women's 5 kilometre classical at the 1999 Asian Winter Games
- Venue: Provincial Nordic Venue
- Dates: 1 February 1999
- Competitors: 15 from 5 nations

Medalists
gold medal	Sumiko Yokoyama	Japan
silver medal	Svetlana Shishkina	Kazakhstan
bronze medal	Luan Zhengrong	China

The women's 5 kilometre classical at the 1999 Asian Winter Games was held on February 1, 1999 at Yongpyong Cross Country Venue, South Korea.

== Schedule ==
All times are Korea Standard Time (UTC+09:00)

Date	Time	Event
Monday, 1 February 1999	10:00	Final

== Results ==
Rank	Athlete	Time
1st place, gold medalist(s)	Sumiko Yokoyama (JPN)	14:22.7
2nd place, silver medalist(s)	Svetlana Shishkina (KAZ)	14:42.3
3rd place, bronze medalist(s)	Luan Zhengrong (CHN)	14:43.1
4	Fumiko Aoki (JPN)	14:43.8
5	Svetlana Deshevykh (KAZ)	14:52.8
6	Kumiko Yokoyama (JPN)	15:10.2
7	Yelena Kolomina (KAZ)	15:10.9
8	Midori Furusawa (JPN)	15:16.6
9	Yun Hwa-ja (KOR)	16:09.0
10	Lee Chun-ja (KOR)	16:10.0
11	Liu Hongxia (CHN)	16:40.2
12	Yoon Myun-jung (KOR)	16:46.3
13	Darya Starostina (KAZ)	16:49.7
14	Khürelbaataryn Bayarmaa (MGL)	20:21.4
15	Pürev-Ochiryn Binderiyaa (MGL)	20:36.0
