= Cross-country skiing at the 2007 Asian Winter Games – Women's 5 kilometre classical =

Women's 5 kilometre classical at the 2007 Asian Winter Games
- Venue: Beida Lake Skiing Resort
- Dates: 31 January 2007
- Competitors: 17 from 6 nations

Medalists
gold medal	Oxana Yatskaya	Kazakhstan
silver medal	Svetlana Malahova-Shishkina	Kazakhstan
bronze medal	Wang Chunli	China

The women's 5 kilometre classical at the 2007 Asian Winter Games was held on January 31, 2007, at Beida Lake Skiing Resort, China.

== Schedule ==
All times are China Standard Time (UTC+08:00)

Date	Time	Event
Wednesday, 31 January 2007	10:00	Final

== Results ==
Legend

- DNS — Did not start

Rank	Athlete	Time
1st place, gold medalist(s)	Oxana Yatskaya (KAZ)	15:57.7
2nd place, silver medalist(s)	Svetlana Malahova-Shishkina (KAZ)	15:59.4
3rd place, bronze medalist(s)	Wang Chunli (CHN)	16:02.7
4	Yelena Antonova (KAZ)	16:16.7
5	Masako Ishida (JPN)	16:27.5
6	Li Hongxue (CHN)	16:29.0
7	Yelena Kolomina (KAZ)	16:34.4
8	Sumiko Yokoyama (JPN)	16:42.1
9	Liu Yuanyuan (CHN)	16:45.0
10	Nobuko Fukuda (JPN)	17:07.5
11	Huo Li (CHN)	17:08.9
12	Lee Chae-won (KOR)	17:55.7
13	Ri Hye-yong (PRK)	19:34.3
14	Kim Young-hee (KOR)	19:53.9
15	Bazarsadyn Altantsetseg (MGL)	21:58.6
16	Battsengeliin Dolgorsüren (MGL)	22:26.8
—	Madoka Natsumi (JPN)	DNS
