= Cross-country skiing at the 1990 Asian Winter Games =

- Venue: Shirahatayama Open Stadium
- Dates: 10–14 March 1990

Cross-country skiing at the 1990 Asian Winter Games took place in the city of Sapporo, Japan with six events contested — three each for men and women.

== Medalists ==
=== Men ===
Event	Gold	Silver	Bronze
15 km classical	Kazunari Sasaki; Japan	Hirofumi Watanabe; Japan	Hiroyuki Imai; Japan
30 km freestyle	Kazunari Sasaki; Japan	Hiroyuki Imai; Japan	Hirofumi Watanabe; Japan
4 × 10 km relay	Japan; Hiroyuki Kudo; Hirofumi Watanabe; Masaharu Yamazaki; Kazunari Sasaki	South Korea; Cho Sung-hoon; Park Ki-ho; Park Byung-chul; Hong Kun-pyo	Mongolia; Chuluuny Batbold; Ziitsagaany Ganbat; Dambajantsagiin Battulga; Gongoryn Myeryei

=== Women ===
Event	Gold	Silver	Bronze
10 km classical	Fumiko Aoki; Japan	Yoshiko Mikami; Japan	Ri Kyong-hui; North Korea
15 km freestyle	Fumiko Aoki; Japan	Naomi Hoshikawa; Japan	Wang Jinfen; China
4 × 5 km relay	Japan; Miwa Ota; Fumiko Aoki; Naomi Hoshikawa; Yoshiko Mikami	China; Song Shiji; Chi Xiumei; Wang Jinfen; Song Aiqin	North Korea; Han Ok-sil; Ri Kyong-hui; Lim Gun-son; Choi Yong-hwa

== Medal table ==
Rank	Nation	Gold	Silver	Bronze	Total
1	Japan (JPN)	6	4	2	12
2	China (CHN)	0	1	1	2
3	South Korea (KOR)	0	1	0	1
4	North Korea (PRK)	0	0	2	2
5	Mongolia (MGL)	0	0	1	1
Totals (5 entries)		6	6	6	18
