= Cross-country skiing at the 2007 Asian Winter Games – Women's sprint freestyle =

Women's sprint freestyle at the 2007 Asian Winter Games
- Venue: Beida Lake Skiing Resort
- Dates: 30 January 2007
- Competitors: 17 from 6 nations

Medalists
gold medal	Wang Chunli	China
silver medal	Yelena Kolomina	Kazakhstan
bronze medal	Hou Yuxia	China

The women's sprint freestyle at the 2007 Asian Winter Games was held on January 30, 2007, at Beida Lake Skiing Resort, China.

== Schedule ==
All times are China Standard Time (UTC+08:00)

Date	Time	Event
Tuesday, 30 January 2007	13:30	Qualification
Tuesday, 30 January 2007	14:30	1/4 finals
Tuesday, 30 January 2007	15:10	Semifinals
Tuesday, 30 January 2007	15:30	Finals

== Results ==
=== Qualification ===
Rank	Athlete	Time
1	Nobuko Fukuda (JPN)	3:05.47
2	Madoka Natsumi (JPN)	3:05.57
3	Yelena Antonova (KAZ)	3:07.71
4	Wang Chunli (CHN)	3:08.42
5	Yelena Kolomina (KAZ)	3:09.31
6	Oxana Yatskaya (KAZ)	3:09.34
7	Natalya Issachenko (KAZ)	3:12.97
8	Man Dandan (CHN)	3:15.29
9	Lee Chae-won (KOR)	3:16.52
10	Song Bo (CHN)	3:20.56
11	Hou Yuxia (CHN)	3:21.49
12	Kim Young-hee (KOR)	3:21.91
13	Kyung In-hwa (KOR)	3:32.28
14	Bae Ji-young (KOR)	3:36.27
15	Ri Hye-yong (PRK)	3:38.38
16	Battsengeliin Dolgorsüren (MGL)	4:08.90
17	Bazarsadyn Altantsetseg (MGL)	4:11.40

=== 1/4 finals ===
==== Heat 1 ====
Rank	Athlete	Time
1	Nobuko Fukuda (JPN)	3:02.9
2	Man Dandan (CHN)	3:03.8
3	Lee Chae-won (KOR)	3:07.4
4	Battsengeliin Dolgorsüren (MGL)	3:50.3

==== Heat 2 ====
Rank	Athlete	Time
1	Wang Chunli (CHN)	3:13.8
2	Yelena Kolomina (KAZ)	3:15.0
3	Kim Young-hee (KOR)	3:18.5
4	Kyung In-hwa (KOR)	3:28.4

==== Heat 3 ====
Rank	Athlete	Time
1	Song Bo (CHN)	3:01.5
2	Madoka Natsumi (JPN)	3:03.9
3	Natalya Issachenko (KAZ)	3:04.3
4	Ri Hye-yong (PRK)	3:33.7

==== Heat 4 ====
Rank	Athlete	Time
1	Oxana Yatskaya (KAZ)	2:58.5
2	Hou Yuxia (CHN)	2:58.6
3	Yelena Antonova (KAZ)	2:59.9
4	Bae Ji-young (KOR)	3:38.2

=== Semifinals ===
==== Heat 1 ====
Rank	Athlete	Time
1	Wang Chunli (CHN)	3:00.9
2	Yelena Kolomina (KAZ)	3:01.0
3	Nobuko Fukuda (JPN)	3:02.0
4	Man Dandan (CHN)	3:02.2

==== Heat 2 ====
Rank	Athlete	Time
1	Hou Yuxia (CHN)	2:56.4
2	Song Bo (CHN)	2:57.2
3	Oxana Yatskaya (KAZ)	2:57.3
4	Madoka Natsumi (JPN)	2:58.0

=== Finals ===
==== Final B ====
Rank	Athlete	Time
1	Oxana Yatskaya (KAZ)	
2	Nobuko Fukuda (JPN)	
3	Man Dandan (CHN)	
4	Madoka Natsumi (JPN)	

==== Final A ====
Rank	Athlete	Time
1st place, gold medalist(s)	Wang Chunli (CHN)	
2nd place, silver medalist(s)	Yelena Kolomina (KAZ)	
3rd place, bronze medalist(s)	Hou Yuxia (CHN)	
4	Song Bo (CHN)	
