= South Korea at the 1986 Asian Winter Games =

- IOC code: KOR
- NOC: Korean Olympic Committee

in Sapporo
- Competitors: 65 in 6 sports
- Officials: 31
- Medals Ranked 3rd: Gold 1 Silver 5 Bronze 12 Total 18

Asian Winter Games appearances (overview)
- 1986; 1990; 1996; 1999; 2003; 2007; 2011; 2017; 2025; 2029

South Korea (IOC designation:Korea) participated in the 1986 Asian Winter Games held in Sapporo, Japan from March 1 to 8, 1986.

== Medal summary ==
=== Medal table ===
Sport	Gold	Silver	Bronze	Total
Speed skating	1	1	2	4
Short track speed skating	0	2	5	7
Cross-country skiing	0	1	2	3
Alpine skiing	0	1	1	2
Biathlon	0	0	1	1
Ice hockey	0	0	1	1
Totals (6 entries)	1	5	12	18

=== Medalists ===
Medal	Name	Sport	Event
Gold	Bae Ki-tae	Speed skating	Men's 1000 m
Silver	Park Jae-hyuk	Alpine skiing	Men's Slalom
Silver	Team Korea	Cross-country skiing	Men's 4 x 10 km Relay
Silver	Yoo Bu-won	Short track speed skating	Women's 1000 m
Silver	Yoo Bu-won	Short track speed skating	Women's 3000 m
Silver	Na Yoon-soo	Speed skating	Men's 500 m
Bronze	Park Jae-hyuk	Alpine skiing	Men's Giant Slalom
Bronze	Team Korea	Biathlon	4 x 7.5 km Relay
Bronze	Jeon Yong-hae	Cross-country skiing	Men's 15 km (Classical)
Bronze	Jeon Yong-hae	Cross-country skiing	Men's 30 km (Free)
Bronze	Team Korea	Ice hockey	Men
Bronze	Kim Ki-hoon	Short track speed skating	Men's 1500 m
Bronze	Na Woon-seop	Short track speed skating	Men's 3000 m
Bronze	Lim Hyun-sook	Short track speed skating	Women's 500 m
Bronze	Lee Hyun-jung	Short track speed skating	Women's 1000 m
Bronze	Yoo Bu-won	Short track speed skating	Women's 1500 m
Bronze	Bae Ki-tae	Speed skating	Men's 500 m
Bronze	Hwang Ik-hwan	Speed skating	Men's 1500 m

Demonstration sport

Medal	Name	Sport	Event
Bronze	Team Korea	Short track speed skating	Men's 3000 m Relay

== Participation details ==
=== Alpine skiing ===
Men

Name	Event	Final	
Name	Event	Time	Rank
Park Jae-hyuk	Giant Slalom	?	3rd place, bronze medalist(s)
Park Jae-hyuk	Slalom	1:42.09	(silver) ^{Note}
Kang Nak-yeon	Slalom	1:49.52	4th
Kim Dong-yoon	Slalom	1:50.25	5th

Women

Name	Event	Final	
Name	Event	Time	Rank
Kim Ok-seon	Slalom	Did not finish	
Jeon Sook-hee	Slalom	Did not finish	

Notes

1: In men's Giant Slalom competition, Park Jae-hyuk was awarded third place on the rule that no country may win all the three medals. He ranked 5th originally but 1st–4th ranked athletes are same country.

=== Biathlon ===
Men (all 6 athletes)

Name	Event	Final	
Name	Event	Time	Rank
Hwang Byung-dae	Sprint	37:26.6	9
Hong Byung-sik	Individual	1:26:54.3	5
Kang Tae-soo; Hong Byung-sik; Joung Young-suk; Hwang Byung-dae	4 x 7.5 km Relay	1:56:12.4	3rd place, bronze medalist(s)

=== Cross-country skiing ===
Men

Name	Event	Final	
Name	Event	Time	Rank
Jeon Young-hae	15 km Classical	?	3rd place, bronze medalist(s)
Jeon Young-hae	30 km Classical	1:27:34.80	(bronze) ^{Note}
Cho Sung-hoon; Hong Kun-pyo; Park Ki-ho; Jeon Young-hae	4 x 10 km Relay	1:50:29.4	2nd place, silver medalist(s)

Notes

1: In men's 30 km classical competition, Jeon Young-hae awarded 3rd place on the rules that no country may win all the three medals.

=== Figure skating ===
- Jung Sung-il - 4th in men's singles

=== Ice hockey ===
Men

Rank	Team	Pld	W	D	L	GF	GA	GD	Pts
Gold medal	China	6	5	1	0	38	9	+29	11
Silver medal	Japan	6	4	1	1	56	13	+43	9
Bronze medal	South Korea	6	2	0	4	11	49	−38	4
4	North Korea	6	0	0	6	8	42	−34	1

March 1, 1986	China	6 – 0	South Korea	Sapporo

March 2, 1986	Japan	20 – 1	South Korea	Sapporo

March 4, 1986	North Korea	1 – 2	South Korea	Sapporo

March 5, 1986	South Korea	2 – 9	China	Sapporo

March 7, 1986	South Korea	2 – 10	Japan	Sapporo

March 8, 1986	South Korea	4 – 3	North Korea	Sapporo

=== Short-track speed skating ===
Men

Name	Event	Final	
Name	Event	Time	Rank
Kim Ki-hoon	1000 m	1:52.27	6th
Kim Ki-hoon	1500 m	2:38.50	3rd place, bronze medalist(s)
Na Woon-seob	1500 m	2:41.50	4th
Na Woon-seob	3000 m	6:04.61	(bronze) ^{Note}
Lee Kyu-cheol			
Lee Joon-ho			
Kwon Young-cheol			

Women

Name	Event	Final	
Name	Event	Time	Rank
Lim Hyun-sook	500 m	52.18	3rd place, bronze medalist(s)
Yoo Bu-won	1000 m	1:49.26	2nd place, silver medalist(s)
Yoo Bu-won	1500 m	2:48.34	3rd place, bronze medalist(s)
Yoo Bu-won	3000 m	5:51.80	2nd place, silver medalist(s)
Lee Hyun-jeong	1000 m	1:49.63	3rd place, bronze medalist(s)
Lee Hyun-jeong	1500 m	2:48.91	4th
Kim Seon-kyung			
Hwang Hyun-joo			

Notes

1: In men's 3000 m competition, Na Woon-seob awarded 3rd place on the rules that no country may win all the three medals.

=== Speed skating ===
Men

Name	Event	Final	
Name	Event	Time	Rank
Bae Ki-tae	500 m	38.68	3rd place, bronze medalist(s)
Bae Ki-tae	1000 m	1:20.22	1st place, gold medalist(s)
Na Yoon-soo	500 m	38.58	2nd place, silver medalist(s)
Na Yoon-soo	1000 m	1:23.29	6th
Hwang Ik-hwan	1000 m	1:22.47	4th
Hwang Ik-hwan	1500 m	2:02.32	(bronze) ^{Note}
Kim Kwan-kyu			
Park Jin-hyun			

Women

Name	Event	Final	
Name	Event	Time	Rank
Choi Seong-yoon	1000 m	34.64	9th
Kim Hyun-na			
Lee Kyung-ja			
Kim Yeong-ok			
Lee Yeon-ju			

Notes

1: In men's 1500 metres competition, Hwang Ik-hwan awarded 3rd place on the rules that no country may win all the three medals.
