= Cross-country skiing at the 1996 Asian Winter Games – Men's 15 kilometre freestyle =

Asian winter games discipline in 1996

Men's 15 kilometre freestyle at the 1996 Asian Winter Games
- Venue: Yabuli Ski Resort
- Dates: 6 February 1996
- Competitors: 22 from 6 nations

Medalists
gold medal	Pavel Ryabinin	Kazakhstan
silver medal	Qu Donghai	China
bronze medal	Vladimir Bortsov	Kazakhstan

The men's 15 kilometre interval start freestyle at the 1996 Asian Winter Games was held on 6 February 1996 at Yabuli Ski Resort, China.

== Results ==
Rank	Athlete	Time
1st place, gold medalist(s)	Pavel Ryabinin (KAZ)	40:19.1
2nd place, silver medalist(s)	Qu Donghai (CHN)	40:41.7
3rd place, bronze medalist(s)	Vladimir Bortsov (KAZ)	41:04.2
4	Xu Zhongcheng (CHN)	41:22.5
5	Andrey Nevzorov (KAZ)	41:40.7
6	Yoshikazu Takeda (JPN)	41:40.8
7	Nikolay Ivanov (KAZ)	41:51.2
8	Daichi Azegami (JPN)	42:09.3
9	Park Byung-chul (KOR)	42:17.5
10	Jiang Tao (CHN)	42:17.7
11	Ahn Jin-soo (KOR)	42:23.6
12	Chen Guoguang (CHN)	42:55.8
13	Hideo Okamoto (JPN)	43:57.6
14	Shin Doo-sun (KOR)	46:03.9
15	Kim Nam-woon (KOR)	47:14.7
16	Gantömöriin Choijants (MGL)	51:00.4
17	Dagvadorjiin Ochirsükh (MGL)	51:37.2
18	Gelagbalgany Ganbaatar (MGL)	52:14.9
19	Ganbaataryn Lkhagvadorj (MGL)	52:32.9
20	Vijendra Singh (IND)	56:56.5
21	Dole Ram Thakur (IND)	1:04:03.3
22	Madho Singh (IND)	1:08:29.7
