= Alpine skiing at the 1986 Asian Winter Games =

- Venue: Sapporo Teine
- Dates: 4–6 March 1986

Alpine skiing at the 1986 Asian Winter Games took place in Sapporo, Japan from 4 to 6 March 1986 with four events contested — two each for men and women.

== Medalists ==
=== Men ===
Event	Gold	Silver	Bronze
Slalom	Naomine Iwaya; Japan	Park Jae-hyuk; South Korea	Ri Jong-su; North Korea
Giant slalom	Tetsuya Okabe; Japan	Chiaki Ishioka; Japan	Park Jae-hyuk; South Korea

=== Women ===
Event	Gold	Silver	Bronze
Slalom	Sachie Sato; Japan	Waka Okazaki; Japan	Jin Xuefei; China
Giant slalom	Harumi Jin; Japan	Sachie Sato; Japan	Jin Xuefei; China

== Medal table ==
Rank	Nation	Gold	Silver	Bronze	Total
1	Japan (JPN)	4	3	0	7
2	South Korea (KOR)	0	1	1	2
3	China (CHN)	0	0	2	2
4	North Korea (PRK)	0	0	1	1
Totals (4 entries)		4	4	4	12
