= Cross-country skiing at the 1996 Asian Winter Games =

- Venue: Yabuli Ski Resort
- Nations: 6

Cross-country skiing at the 1996 Winter Asian Games took place in the city of Harbin, China with six events contested — three each for men and women.

== Medalists ==
=== Men ===
Event	Gold	Silver	Bronze
10 km classical	Pavel Ryabinin; Kazakhstan	Vladimir Bortsov; Kazakhstan	Park Byung-chul; South Korea
15 km freestyle	Pavel Ryabinin; Kazakhstan	Qu Donghai; China	Vladimir Bortsov; Kazakhstan
4 × 10 km relay	Kazakhstan; Vladimir Bortsov; Samat Musin; Andrey Nevzorov; Pavel Ryabinin	Japan	China

=== Women ===
Event	Gold	Silver	Bronze
5 km classical	Oxana Yatskaya; Kazakhstan	Sumiko Yokoyama; Japan	Yelena Chernetsova; Kazakhstan
10 km freestyle	Sumiko Yokoyama; Japan	Yu Shumei; China	Guo Dongling; China
4 × 5 km relay	China; Guo Dongling; Luan Zhengrong; Wang Jinfen; Yu Shumei	Kazakhstan; Yelena Chernetsova; Svetlana Shishkina; Oxana Yatskaya	Japan

== Medal table ==
Rank	Nation	Gold	Silver	Bronze	Total
1	Kazakhstan (KAZ)	4	2	2	8
2	China (CHN)	1	2	2	5
3	Japan (JPN)	1	2	1	4
4	South Korea (KOR)	0	0	1	1
Totals (4 entries)		6	6	6	18

== Participating nations ==
- China (10)
- India
- Japan
- Kazakhstan (10)
- Mongolia
- South Korea
