= Cross-country skiing at the 1996 Asian Winter Games – Men's 10 kilometre classical =

Asian winter games discipline in 1996

Men's 10 kilometre classical at the 1996 Asian Winter Games
- Venue: Yabuli Ski Resort
- Dates: 11 February 1996
- Competitors: 18 from 5 nations

Medalists
gold medal	Pavel Ryabinin	Kazakhstan
silver medal	Vladimir Bortsov	Kazakhstan
bronze medal	Park Byung-chul	South Korea

The men's 10 kilometre interval start classical at the 1996 Asian Winter Games was held on 11 February 1996 at Yabuli Ski Resort, China.

== Results ==
Rank	Athlete	Time
1st place, gold medalist(s)	Pavel Ryabinin (KAZ)	29:11.7
2nd place, silver medalist(s)	Vladimir Bortsov (KAZ)	29:40.7
3rd place, bronze medalist(s)	Park Byung-chul (KOR)	30:11.5
4	Daichi Azegami (JPN)	30:14.3
5	Qu Donghai (CHN)	30:20.4
6	Hideo Okamoto (JPN)	30:28.9
7	Andrey Nevzorov (KAZ)	30:31.7
8	Chen Guoguang (CHN)	30:39.5
9	Samat Musin (KAZ)	30:47.4
10	Ahn Jin-soo (KOR)	31:36.7
11	Xu Zhongcheng (CHN)	31:48.4
12	Yoshikazu Takeda (JPN)	31:54.6
13	Wu Jintao (CHN)	32:04.1
14	Ganbaataryn Lkhagvadorj (MGL)	33:05.0
15	Shin Doo-sun (KOR)	33:17.4
16	Kim Nam-woon (KOR)	33:43.9
17	Dagvadorjiin Ochirsükh (MGL)	36:10.5
18	Gelagbalgany Ganbaatar (MGL)	36:45.5
