= Short-track speed skating at the 1986 Asian Winter Games =

- Venue: Mikaho Gymnasium
- Dates: 5–6 March 1986

Short-track speed skating at the 1986 Asian Winter Games took place in the city of Sapporo, Japan, with eight events being contested – four each for men and women.

== Medalists ==
=== Men ===
Event	Gold	Silver	Bronze
500 m	Kenichi Sugio; Japan	Toshinobu Kawai; Japan	Kim Chang-hwan; North Korea
1000 m	Yuichi Akasaka; Japan	Tatsuyoshi Ishihara; Japan	Kim Chang-hwan; North Korea
1500 m	Toshinobu Kawai; Japan	Tatsuyoshi Ishihara; Japan	Kim Ki-hoon; South Korea
3000 m	Yuichi Akasaka; Japan	Tatsuyoshi Ishihara; Japan	Na Un-seop; South Korea

=== Women ===
Event	Gold	Silver	Bronze
500 m	Eiko Shishii; Japan	Yumiko Yamada; Japan	Lim Hyon-sook; South Korea
1000 m	Hiromi Takeuchi; Japan	Yoo Boo-won; South Korea	Lee Hyun-jung; South Korea
1500 m	Mariko Kinoshita; Japan	Hiromi Takeuchi; Japan	Yoo Boo-won; South Korea
3000 m	Eiko Shishii; Japan	Yoo Boo-won; South Korea	Hiromi Takeuchi; Japan

== Medal table ==
Rank	Nation	Gold	Silver	Bronze	Total
1	Japan (JPN)	8	6	1	15
2	South Korea (KOR)	0	2	5	7
3	North Korea (PRK)	0	0	2	2
Totals (3 entries)		8	8	8	24
