= Ski jumping at the 1986 Asian Winter Games =

- Venue: Okurayama Ski Jump Stadium
- Dates: 2 March 1986

Ski jumping at the 1986 Asian Winter Games took place in the city of Sapporo, Japan on 2 March 1986 with only one event, Large hill individual being contested. The Olympic Council of Asia General Assembly in Seoul in 1984 decided to give Japan the privilege of hosting the first ever Asian Winter Games. The event was only for demonstration; the medals gained here did not officially count towards the final medal tally.

The event took place at the Okurayama Ski Jump Stadium. The host nation Japan dominated the event by winning all three medals of the competition.

Jun Shibuya of Japan won the competition with the score of 189.5, his teammate Sadao Shimizu finished second and won the silver with 179.0, another Japanese athlete Masahiko Takahashi won the bronze medal in this demonstration competition with the score of 168.3.

== Medalists ==
Event	Gold	Silver	Bronze
Large hill individual	Jun Shibuya; Japan	Sadao Shimizu; Japan	Masahiko Takahashi; Japan
