= Furusawa =

Furusawa (written: 古澤) is a Japanese surname. Notable people with the surname include:

- Akira Furusawa (古澤 明; born 1961), Japanese physicist
- Midori Furusawa (古澤 緑; born 1974), Japanese cross-country skier
- Takeshi Furusawa (古澤 健; born 1972), Japanese film director and screenwriter
- Tōru Furusawa (古澤 徹; born 1962), Japanese voice actor
