= Ice hockey at the 1986 Asian Winter Games =

- Venue: Tsukisamu Gymnasium
- Dates: 1–8 March 1986
- Nations: 4

Ice hockey at the 1986 Asian Winter Games took place in the city of Sapporo, Japan. Only four nations competed in the sport: China, Japan, South Korea and North Korea.

The competition was held at the Tsukisamu Gymnasium from 1 to 8 March.

== Schedule ==
●	Round	●	Last round

Event↓/Date →	1st Sat	2nd Sun	3rd Mon	4th Tue	5th Wed	6th Thu	7th Fri	8th Sat
Men	●	●		●	●		●	●

== Medalists ==
Event	Gold	Silver	Bronze
Men	China; Wang Yongjun; Zhang Yan; Wu Xing; Sun Jiaqing; Hu Yue; Huang Long; Wang Benyu; Zhang Zhinan; Tian Yujie; Chen Jingjie; Wang Fuping; Sun Huanwei; Sun Xiaodong; Zhang Zhiqiang; Wang Anfu; Zhao Danshi; Wang Hui; Liu Wenwu; Fu Zhenguo; Wei Lingyuan	Japan; Takeshi Iwamoto; Atsuo Kudo; Hayato Aoyama; Fumihiko Kajikawa; Tadashi Haga; Yuji Sugai; Katsutoshi Kawamura; Hidekatsu Takagi; Shuji Momoi; Sadaki Honma; Kenji Tanaka; Keiji Takahashi; Yoshio Hoshino; Toshiyuki Yajima; Norio Suzuki; Kazumi Unjo; Kiyotaka Terao; Toshiyuki Sakai; Takayuki Ueno; Motoki Ebina; Kenichi Suzuki; Masaki Hino	South Korea; Pyo Young-woon; Shin Seung-ho; Kim Sam-duk; Byun Sun-wook; Moon Joon-woong; Cho Chan-suk; Han Jung-hyun; Choi Won-sik; Hong Seok-bum; Baek Dong-won; Park Hyun-wook; Kim Jung-kyu; Baek Woon-seong; Kang Mo-hyun; Kim Hee-woo; Shim Bo-kwang; Yoon Sung-yup; Lee Kyung-hoon; Kim Jung-tae; Lee Jung-yong; Shin Sang-chul; Yun Heon-chul

== Results ==
Pos	Team	Pld	W	D	L	GF	GA	GD	Pts
1	China	6	5	1	0	38	9	+29	11
2	Japan	6	4	1	1	56	13	+43	9
3	South Korea	6	2	0	4	11	49	−38	4
4	North Korea	6	0	0	6	8	42	−34	0

Source: Results

1 March	China	6–0 (2–0, 1–0, 3–0)	South Korea	Tsukisamu Gymnasium, Sapporo

1 March	Japan	10–1 (3–0, 2–0, 5–1)	North Korea	Tsukisamu Gymnasium, Sapporo

2 March	North Korea	1–7 (0–2, 0–3, 1–2)	China	Tsukisamu Gymnasium, Sapporo

2 March	Japan	20–1 (8–1, 3–0, 9–0)	South Korea	Tsukisamu Gymnasium, Sapporo

4 March	North Korea	1–2 (1–0, 0–1, 0–1)	South Korea	Tsukisamu Gymnasium, Sapporo

4 March	Japan	1–4 (0–0, 0–3, 1–1)	China	Tsukisamu Gymnasium, Sapporo

5 March	South Korea	2–9 (1–1, 0–5, 1–3)	China	Tsukisamu Gymnasium, Sapporo

5 March	North Korea	1–11 (1–2, 0–4, 0–5)	Japan	Tsukisamu Gymnasium, Sapporo

7 March	China	8–1 (1–0, 3–0, 4–1)	North Korea	Tsukisamu Gymnasium, Sapporo

7 March	South Korea	2–10 (1–1, 1–4, 0–5)	Japan	Tsukisamu Gymnasium, Sapporo

8 March	South Korea	4–3 (1–1, 2–2, 1–0)	North Korea	Tsukisamu Gymnasium, Sapporo

8 March	China	4–4 (1–4, 2–0, 1–0)	Japan	Tsukisamu Gymnasium, Sapporo

== Final standing ==
Rank	Team	Pld	W	D	L
1st place, gold medalist(s)	China	6	5	1	0
2nd place, silver medalist(s)	Japan	6	4	1	1
3rd place, bronze medalist(s)	South Korea	6	2	0	4
4	North Korea	6	0	0	6
