= Jin Xuefei (skier) =

Chinese skier

Personal information
- Nationality: Chinese
- Born: 25 June 1964 (age 62) Jilin, China

Sport
- Sport: Alpine skiing
Medal record
Women's alpine skiing
Asian Winter Games
Bronze medal – third place	1986 Sapporo	Slalom
Bronze medal – third place	1986 Sapporo	Giant slalom

Jin Xuefei (born 25 June 1964) is a Chinese alpine skier. She competed in two events at the 1984 Winter Olympics.

She also participated at the 1986 Asian Winter Games and won two bronze medals in slalom and giant slalom events.
