= Naomine Iwaya =

Japanese alpine skier (born 1960)

Medal record

Men's alpine skiing

Representing Japan

Asian Winter Games
Gold medal – first place	1986 Sapporo	Slalom

Naomine Iwaya (born 10 December 1960) is a Japanese former alpine skier who competed in the 1984 Winter Olympics.
