= Heikki Kivikko =

Finnish cross-country skier

Personal information
- Nationality: Finland
- Born: 31 December 1963 (age 62) Ähtäri, Finland

Sport
- Sport: Skiing

World Cup career
- Seasons: 4 – (1988, 1990, 1992, 1996)
- Indiv. starts: 4
- Indiv. podiums: 0
- Team starts: 1
- Team podiums: 0

Heikki Kivikko (born 31 December 1963) is a Finnish cross-country skier. He competed in the 50 km event at the 1988 Winter Olympics.

== Cross-country skiing results ==
All results are sourced from the International Ski Federation (FIS).

=== Olympic Games ===
Year	Age	15 km	30 km	50 km	4 × 10 km relay
1988	24	—	—	29	—

=== World Cup ===
==== Season standings ====
Season	Age	Overall
1988	24	NC
1990	26	NC
1992	28	NC
1996	32	NC
