= Tatsuyoshi Ishihara =

Japanese short-track speed skater (born 1964)

Personal information
- Born: 24 March 1964 (age 62) Saga, Japan
Medal record
Men's short-track speed skating
Representing Japan
Olympic Games
Bronze medal – third place	1992 Albertville	5000 m relay
World Championships
Gold medal – first place	1986 Chamonix	Overall
Gold medal – first place	1990 Amsterdam	1500 m
Gold medal – first place	1985 Amsterdam	5000m Relay
Gold medal – first place	1992 Denver	5000m Relay
Gold medal – first place	1994 Guildford	5000m Relay
Silver medal – second place	1984 Peterborough	Overall
Silver medal – second place	1985 Amsterdam	Overall
Bronze medal – third place	1988 St. Louis	Overall
Bronze medal – third place	1992 Denver	1500 m
Bronze medal – third place	1980 Milan	5000m Relay
Bronze medal – third place	1981 Meudon	5000m Relay
Bronze medal – third place	1986 Chamonix	5000m Relay
World Team Championships
Gold medal – first place	1991 Seoul	Team
Bronze medal – third place	1992 Minamimaki	Team
Asian Games
Silver medal – second place	1986 Sapporo	1000 m
Silver medal – second place	1986 Sapporo	1500 m
Silver medal – second place	1986 Sapporo	3000 m

Tatsuyoshi Ishihara (石原 辰義, Ishihara Tatsuyoshi; born 24 March 1964) is a Japanese short-track speed skater, who won a bronze medal in the 5000 m relay at the 1992 Winter Olympics together with teammates Yuichi Akasaka, Toshinobu Kawai and Tsutomu Kawasaki.
