= Toshinobu Kawai =

Japanese short-track speed skater

Medal record

Men's short-track speed skating

Representing Japan

Olympic Games
Bronze medal – third place	1992 Albertville	5000 m relay

Asian Games
Gold medal – first place	1986 Sapporo	1500 m
Silver medal – second place	1986 Sapporo	500 m

Toshinobu Kawai (河合 季信, Kawai Toshinobu; born 19 December 1967 in Nagoya, Japan) is a Japanese short-track speed skater, who won a bronze medal in the 5000 m relay at the 1992 Winter Olympics together with teammates Yuichi Akasaka, Tatsuyoshi Ishihara and Tsutomu Kawasaki. Before 1992, he won two gold medals in the World Short Track Speed Skating Championships, 1985 and 1987.

He is currently working at the University of Tsukuba and holds the position of Director of Strengthening for the Japan Skating Federation.
