= Yuichi Akasaka =

Japanese short-track speed skater (born 1967)

Personal information
- Born: 29 September 1967 (age 59)
Medal record
Men's short-track speed skating
Representing Japan
Olympic Games
Bronze medal – third place	1992 Albertville	5000 m relay
World Championships
Gold medal – first place	1985 Amsterdam	5000m Relay
Gold medal – first place	1992 Denver	5000m Relay
Gold medal – first place	1994 Guildford	5000m Relay
Silver medal – second place	1990 Amsterdam	1500 m
Silver medal – second place	1990 Amsterdam	3000 m
Bronze medal – third place	1983 Tokyo	5000m Relay
Bronze medal – third place	1986 Chamonix	5000m Relay
Bronze medal – third place	1989 Solihul	500 m
Bronze medal – third place	1989 Solihul	3000 m
Bronze medal – third place	1990 Amsterdam	Overall
World Team Championships
Gold medal – first place	1991 Seoul	Team
Bronze medal – third place	1992 Minamimaki	Team
Asian Games
Gold medal – first place	1986 Sapporo	1000 m
Gold medal – first place	1986 Sapporo	3000 m

Yuichi Akasaka (赤坂 雄一, Akasaka Yūichi; born 29 September 1967) is a Japanese short-track speed skater, who won a bronze medal in the 5000 m relay at the 1992 Winter Olympics together with teammates Tatsuyoshi Ishihara, Toshinobu Kawai and Tsutomu Kawasaki.
