= Fausto Bormetti =

Italian cross-country skier (born 1965)

Personal information
- Nationality: Italian
- Born: 20 May 1965 (age 60) Bormio, Italy

Sport
- Sport: Cross-country skiing

Fausto Bormetti (born 20 May 1965) is an Italian cross-country skier. He competed in the men's 50 kilometre freestyle event at the 1988 Winter Olympics.
