= Antti Ticklén =

Finnish cross-country skier

Personal information
- Nationality: Finland
- Born: 19 July 1958 (age 68) Paavola, Finland

Sport
- Sport: Skiing

World Cup career
- Seasons: 2 – (1987–1988)
- Indiv. starts: 2
- Indiv. podiums: 0
- Team starts: 0

Antti Ticklén (born 19 July 1958) is a Finnish cross-country skier. He competed in the 50 km event at the 1988 Winter Olympics.

== Cross-country skiing results ==
=== Olympic Games ===
Year	Age	15 km	30 km	50 km	4 × 10 km relay
1988	29	—	—	45	—

=== World Cup ===
==== Season standings ====
Season	Age	Overall
1987	28	NC
1988	29	NC
