= Park Byung-woo =

South Korean cross-country skier

Personal information
- Nationality: South Korean
- Born: 28 June 1969 (age 55)

Sport
- Sport: Cross-country skiing

Park Byung-woo (born 28 June 1969) is a South Korean cross-country skier. He competed in the men's 50 kilometre freestyle event at the 1988 Winter Olympics.
