= Chiaki Ishioka =

Japanese alpine skier (born 1961)

Medal record

Men's alpine skiing

Representing Japan

Asian Winter Games
Silver medal – second place	1986 Sapporo	Giant slalom

Chiaki Ishioka (石岡 千秋, Ishioka Chiaki; born 16 March 1961) is a Japanese former alpine skier who competed in the 1988 Winter Olympics.
