= Cross-country skiing at the 2011 Asian Winter Games – Women's 15 kilometre classical =

Women's 15 kilometre classical at the 2011 Asian Winter Games
- Venue: Biathlon and Cross-Country Ski Complex
- Dates: 6 February 2011
- Competitors: 6 from 3 nations

Medalists
gold medal	Masako Ishida	Japan
silver medal	Yelena Kolomina	Kazakhstan
bronze medal	Svetlana Malahova-Shishkina	Kazakhstan

The women's 15 kilometre mass start classical at the 2011 Asian Winter Games was held on February 6, 2011, at Biathlon and Cross-Country Ski Complex, Almaty.

== Schedule ==
All times are Almaty Time (UTC+06:00)

Date	Time	Event
Sunday, 6 February 2011	12:35	Final

== Results ==
Rank	Athlete	Time
1st place, gold medalist(s)	Masako Ishida (JPN)	45:45.3
2nd place, silver medalist(s)	Yelena Kolomina (KAZ)	46:31.1
3rd place, bronze medalist(s)	Svetlana Malahova-Shishkina (KAZ)	46:33.5
4	Li Hongxue (CHN)	46:51.5
5	Li Xin (CHN)	49:39.3
6	Naoko Omori (JPN)	51:32.3
