= Tsukisamu Gymnasium =

Sports facility in Sapporo, Japan

Coordinates: 43.029247°N 141.399268°E

Sapporo Tsukisamu Gymnasium
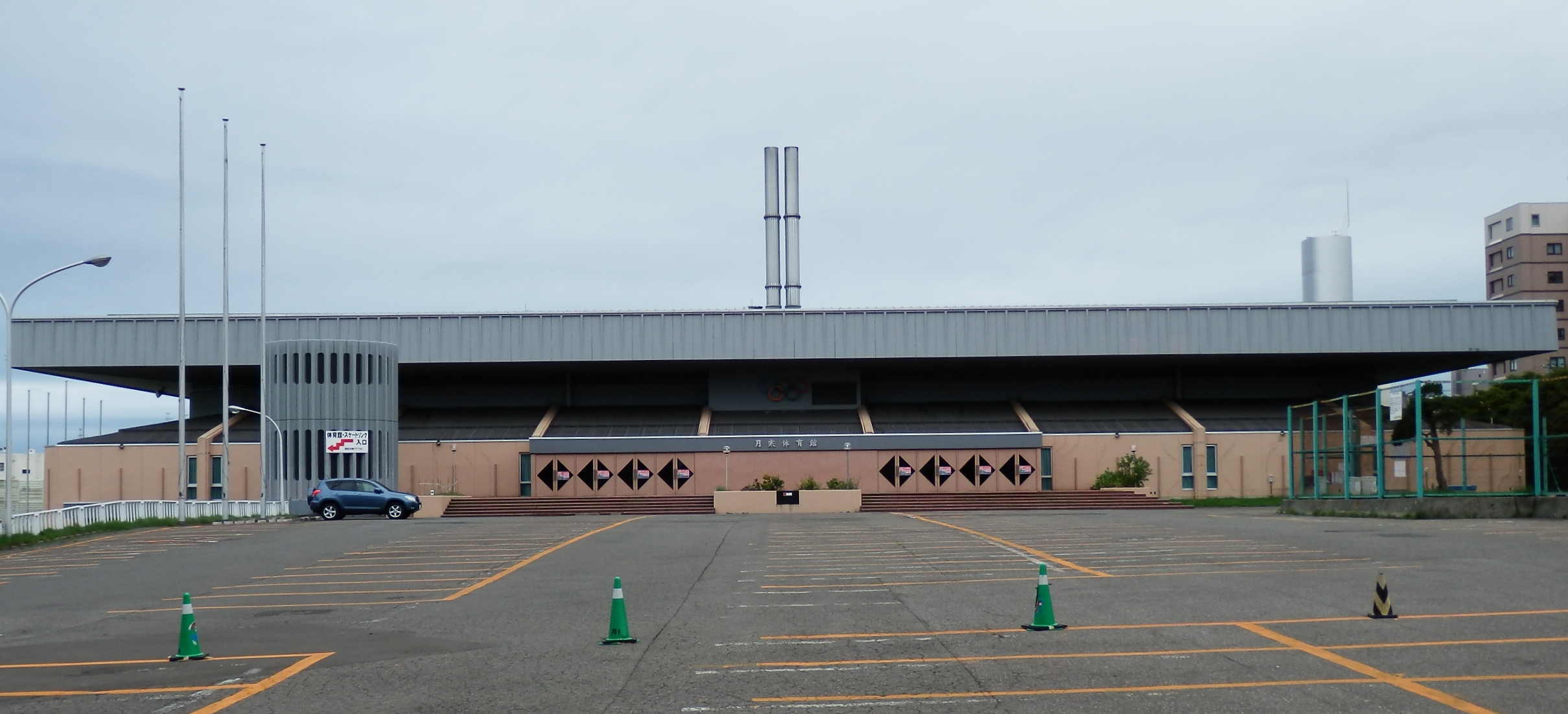
- Tsukisamu Gym
- Interactive map of Sapporo Tsukisamu Gymnasium
- Location: Sapporo, Japan
- Owner: Hokkaidō Prefecture
- Operator: Sapporo Health Sports Foundation
- Capacity: 2,321

Construction
- Opened: 1972

Tenant
- 1972 Winter Olympics

The Sapporo Tsukisamu Gymnasium (札幌市月寒体育館) is an indoor sporting arena located in Toyohira-ku, Sapporo, Hokkaidō.

The first floor is a skating rink used for ice hockey games, figure skating and leisure skating throughout the year. On the second floor are table tennis facilities, and a corridor for jogging.

The arena opened in 1972. It hosted some of the ice hockey event at the 1972 Winter Olympics.

It has a total capacity of 3,371 (2,321 seats, and 1,052 standing places). It is located next to the Tsukisamu Outdoor Stadium (used for rugby games), and four tennis courts.

In 1986 (along with Makomanai Ice Arena) and 1990, hosted the Asian Winter Games ice hockey tournaments. Eighteen years later, -in 2008- it was the main venue of the ice hockey World Championship Division I Group B and, every year, hosts some regular season games of the Asia League Ice Hockey, usually played around Christmas. The arena hosted the women's ice hockey tournament at the 2017 Asian Winter Games.

The gymnasium is also the home arena of the team Skate House, who plays on the (second tier) hockey league, the J-ICE North League. The venue was used for the women's world curling championship in 2015.

== Access ==
- Tōhō Line: 1 minutes walk from Tsukisamu-Chūō Station.
