= Cho Sung-hoon (skier) =

South Korean skier (born 1964)

Personal information
- Nationality: South Korean
- Born: 3 April 1964 (age 62) Gangwon Province, South Korea
- Height: 178 cm (5 ft 10 in)
- Weight: 65 kg (143 lb)

Korean name
- Hangul: 조성훈
- RR: Jo Seonghun
- MR: Cho Sŏnghun

Sport
- Sport: Cross-country skiing
Medal record
Representing South Korea
Men's Cross-country skiing
Asian Winter Games
Silver medal – second place	1986 Sapporo	4 × 10 km relay
Silver medal – second place	1990 Sapporo	4 × 10 km relay

Cho Sung-hoon, also written as Jo Seong-hun (born 3 April 1964) is a South Korean former cross-country skier.

He is two times Asian Games medalist, winning the silver medal at both the 1986 Asian Winter Games and 1990 Asian Winter Games in Sapporo in the 4 × 10 km relay event. He also competed at other international competitions, including at the 1984 Winter Olympics and the 1988 Winter Olympics.
