= Dmitriy Yeremenko =

Kazakhstani cross-country skier (born 1980)

Dmitry Yeryomenko
Personal information
- Nationality: Kazakhstani
- Born: 29 November 1980 (age 45) Shchuchinsk, Kazakhstan

Sport
- Sport: Cross-country skiing

Dmitry Yeryomenko (Дмитрий Анатольевич Еременко, born 29 November 1980) is a Kazakhstani cross-country skier. He competed in the men's 15 kilometre classical event at the 2006 Winter Olympics.
