= Hiroyuki Imai =

Japanese cross-country skier (born 1970)

Medal record

Men's cross-country skiing

Representing Japan

Asian Winter Games
Silver medal – second place	1990 Sapporo	30 km freestyle
Silver medal – second place	1999 Gangwon	4×10 km relay
Bronze medal – third place	1990 Sapporo	15 km classical

Hiroyuki Imai (今井 博幸, Imai Hiroyuki) (born March 12, 1970) is a former Japanese cross-country skier who competed from 1992 to 2005. Competing in four Winter Olympics, he earned his best career finish of sixth in the 50 km event at Salt Lake City in 2002.

Imai's best finish at the FIS Nordic World Ski Championships was ninth in the 50 km event at Val di Fiemme in 2003. His best World Cup finish was ninth in a 30 km event in Austria in 2001.

Imai earned six individual career victories in lesser events up to 30 km from 1996 to 2005.
