= Akira Furusawa =

Japanese physicist and professor

- Education: University of Tokyo (PhD, 1991)
- Scientific career
- Fields: Physics
- Workplaces: University of Tokyo (2000-present)

Akira Furusawa (Japanese: 古澤 明, Hepburn: Furusawa Akira; born 1961) is a Japanese physicist known for his contributions to quantum teleportation. He is a professor of physics in University of Tokyo and specializes in nonlinear optics, quantum optics, and quantum information science.

== Education and career ==
Furusawa was born in 1961 in the Saitama Prefecture of Japan and attended Saitama Prefectural Urawa High School.

He received his undergraduate degree in Engineering Physics from University of Tokyo in 1984 and a master's degree from the same institution in 1986. In the same year, he began working for Nikon. He obtained his PhD from University of Tokyo in 1991.

He was an assistant researcher at Jeff Kimble's lab in California Institute of Technology from 1996 to 1998, where he made advancements in quantum teleportation research.

In 2000, he left Nikon and became an assistant professor in University of Tokyo's Engineering Physics department. In 2007, he became a full professor.

In 2013, his research group perfected existing quantum teleportation techniques and reduced noise in communications.

As of 2024, Furusawa is working on building an optical quantum computer. It is generally believed that several different hardware-based technology platforms are possible candidates for building a quantum computer. Though some of these technologies, particularly superconductors and semiconductors, have a head start, Furusawa believes that light has advantages that will eventually lead to an optical quantum computer winning against other approaches. A significant part of Furusawa's recent work has focused on generating large-scale cluster states, which are a major substrate for photonics-based universal quantum computing.

== Awards and recognitions ==
He was awarded the purple ribbon of Japan's Medals of Honor in 2017 for his contributions to Quantum Computing.

== Publications ==
Furusawa published several books on quantum mechanics.
