= Dambajantsagiin Battulga =

Mongolian cross-country skier (born 1968)

Personal information
- Nationality: Mongolian
- Born: 5 January 1968 (age 58)

Sport
- Sport: Cross-country skiing
Medal record
Men's cross-country skiing
Representing Mongolia
Asian Winter Games
Bronze medal – third place	1990 Sapporo	Relay

Dambajantsagiin Battulga (Mongolian: Дамбажанцагийн Баттулга; born 5 January 1968) is a Mongolian cross-country skier. He competed in the men's 15 kilometre classical event at the 1988 Winter Olympics.

He also participated at the 1990 Asian Winter Games and won a bronze medal.
