= Shunsuke Komamura =

Japanese cross-country skier (born 1979)

Personal information
- Nationality: Japanese
- Born: 20 May 1979 (age 45); Niigata, Japan

Sport
- Sport: Cross-country skiing

Shunsuke Komamura (駒村 俊介, Komamura Shunsuke, born 20 May 1979) is a Japanese cross-country skier. He competed in the men's sprint event at the 2006 Winter Olympics.
