= Park Jae-hyuk =

South Korean alpine skier (born 1963)

Personal information
- Nationality: South Korean
- Born: 3 June 1963 (age 63)

Sport
- Sport: Alpine skiing

Park Jae-hyuk (born 3 June 1963) is a South Korean alpine skier. He competed in three events at the 1988 Winter Olympics.
