= Hiromi Takeuchi =

Japanese speed skater (born 1966)

Personal information
- Nationality: Japanese
- Born: 14 March 1966 (age 59); Tokyo, Japan

Sport
- Sport: Short track speed skating

Hiromi Takeuchi (竹内 洋美, Takeuchi Hiromi, born 14 March 1966) is a Japanese short track speed skater. She competed in the women's 3000 metre relay event at the 1992 Winter Olympics.
