= Jun Shibuya =

Japanese ski jumper

Personal information
- Full name: Jun Shibuya

Sport
- Sport: Skiing

World Cup career
- Seasons: 1993–1996
- Indiv. podiums: 1 Team
- Team podiums: 1 Team
- Updated on 30 March 2015

Jun Shibuya (渋谷潤, Shibuya Jun) is a retired Japanese ski jumper.
