= Daichi Azegami =

Japanese cross-country skier (born 1974)

Personal information
- Nationality: Japanese
- Born: 23 March 1974 (age 51); Nagano, Japan

Sport
- Sport: Cross-country skiing

Daichi Azegami (畔上 大地, Azegami Daichi, born 23 March 1974) is a Japanese cross-country skier. He competed in the men's sprint event at the 2002 Winter Olympics.
