= Tang Yuqin =

Chinese cross-country skier (born 1963)

Personal information
- Nationality: Chinese
- Born: 12 May 1963 (age 61); Jilin, China

Sport
- Sport: Cross-country skiing

Tang Yuqin (born 12 May 1963) is a Chinese cross-country skier. She competed at the 1984 Winter Olympics and the 1988 Winter Olympics.
