= Pavel Ryabinin =

Kazakhstani cross-country skier (born 1971)

Medal record

Men's cross-country skiing

Representing Kazakhstan

Asian Winter Games
Gold medal – first place	1996 Harbin	10 km
Gold medal – first place	1996 Harbin	15 km
Gold medal – first place	1996 Harbin	4×10 km relay
Gold medal – first place	1999 Gangwon	4×10 km relay
Silver medal – second place	1999 Gangwon	15 km

Pavel Ryabinin (Павел Сергеевич Рябинин, born 8 April 1971) is a Kazakhstani cross-country skier who competed from 1994 to 2002. His best World Cup finish was 18th at a 15 km race in Italy in 1994.

Ryabinin also competed in three Winter Olympics, earning his best finish of 13th in the 30 km at Nagano in 1998. His best finish at the FIS Nordic World Ski Championships was 20th in the 10 km + 15 km combined pursuit event at Ramsau in 1999.
