= Jun Yeung-hae =

South Korean cross-country skier

Personal information
- Nationality: South Korean
- Born: 13 September 1964 (age 61)

Sport
- Sport: Cross-country skiing

Jun Yeung-hae (born 13 September 1964) is a South Korean cross-country skier. He competed in the men's 15 kilometre classical event at the 1988 Winter Olympics.
