= Yuichi Onda =

Japanese cross-country skier (born 1980)

Medal record

Men's cross country skiing

Representing Japan

Asian Games
Gold medal – first place	2007 Changchun	Sprint
Silver medal – second place	2007 Changchun	4×10 km relay
Bronze medal – third place	2011 Astana-Almaty	Sprint

Yuichi Onda (恩田 祐一, Onda Yūichi) (born June 24, 1980) is a Japanese cross-country skier who has competed since 1999. Competing in two Winter Olympics, he earned his best finish of 12th in the team sprint event at Turin in 2006 while his best individual finish was 17th in the individual sprint event at Vancouver four years later.

Onda's best finish at the FIS Nordic World Ski Championships was tenth twice both in the team sprint (2007, 2009) while his best individual finish was 25th in the individual sprint event at Sapporo in 2007.

His best World Cup finish was fourth twice both in individual sprint events (2007, 2009).
