= Katsuhito Ebisawa =

Japanese cross-country skier (born 1972)

Medal record

Men's cross-country skiing

Representing Japan

Asian Winter Games
Gold medal – first place	2003 Aomori	4×10 km relay
Silver medal – second place	1999 Gangwon	4×10 km relay
Silver medal – second place	2007 Changchun	4×10 km relay
Bronze medal – third place	2007 Changchun	30 km

Katsuhito Ebisawa (蛯沢克仁, Ebisawa Katsuhito) (born July 11, 1972) is a Japanese cross-country skier who has competed since 1995. Competing in three Winter Olympics, he earned his best career and individual finishes at Nagano in 1998 with a seventh in the 4 x 10 km relay and 21st in the 10 km + 15 km combined pursuit, respectively.

Ebisawa's best finish at the FIS Nordic World Ski Championships was 15th in the 30 km event at Trondheim in 1997. His best World Cup finish was ninth in an individual sprint event in Germany in 1996.

Ebisawa's best career finish was second three times at FIS races up to 30 km from 1996 to 2007.
