= Song Shiji =

Chinese skier

Personal information
- Nationality: Chinese
- Born: 18 October 1964 (age 60); Jilin, China

Sport
- Sport: Cross-country skiing

Song Shiji (born 18 October 1964) is a Chinese cross-country skier. She competed in three events at the 1984 Winter Olympics.
