= Yoshio Hoshino =

Japanese ice hockey player

Personal information
- Nationality: Japanese
- Born: 2 November 1950 (age 74); Tochigi, Japan

Sport
- Sport: Ice hockey

Yoshio Hoshino (星野 好男, Hoshino Yoshio, born 2 November 1950) is a Japanese ice hockey player. He competed in the men's tournaments at the 1972 Winter Olympics, the 1976 Winter Olympics and the 1980 Winter Olympics.
