= Darya Starostina =

Kazakhstani skier (born 1982)

Personal information
- Nationality: Kazakhstani
- Born: 19 October 1982 (age 43) Astana, Kazakhstan

Sport
- Sport: Cross-country skiing

Darya Starostina (Дарья Юрьевна Старостина, born 19 October 1982) is a Kazakhstani cross-country skier. She competed at the 2002 Winter Olympics and the 2006 Winter Olympics.
