= Ri Kyong-hui =

North Korean cross-country skier

Personal information
- Born: 11 August 1967 (age 58)

Sport
- Country: North Korea
- Sport: cross-country skiing

Ri Kyong-hui or Li Gyong-hui (Korean: 리경희; born 11 August 1967) is a former North Korean female cross-country skier. She competed at the 1992 Winter Olympics representing North Korea.
