= Jung Eui-myung =

South Korean cross-country skier

Personal information
- Full name: Jung Ui-myeong
- Nationality: South Korean
- Born: 5 February 1982 (age 44)

Sport
- Sport: Cross-country skiing

Jung Eui-myung (Korean: 정의명; born 5 February 1982) is a South Korean cross-country skier. He competed at the 2002 Winter Olympics and the 2006 Winter Olympics.
