= Fumiko Aoki =

Japanese cross country skier (born 1966)

Medal record

Women's cross-country skiing

Representing Japan

Asian Games
Gold medal – first place	1990 Sapporo	10 km
Gold medal – first place	1990 Sapporo	15 km
Bronze medal – third place	1999 Gangwon	10 km
Silver medal – second place	1999 Gangwon	4×5 km relay

Fumiko Aoki (青木 富美子, Aoki Fumiko, born November 22, 1966) is a Japanese cross country skier who competed from 1991 to 2003. Her best World Cup finish was fifth on three occasions, all in 1997.

Aoki also competed in three Winter Olympics, earning her best finish of 11th in the 15 km event at Lillehammer in 1994. Her best finish at the FIS Nordic World Ski Championships was 13th in the 15 km event at Val di Fiemme in 1991.
