= Taniyuki Yuki =

Japanese cross-country skier (born 1960)

Personal information
- Nationality: Japanese
- Born: 6 May 1960 (age 64); Yamagata, Japan

Sport
- Sport: Cross-country skiing

Taniyuki Yuki (結城谷行, Yuki Taniyuki, born 6 May 1960) is a Japanese cross-country skier. He competed in the men's 15 kilometre classical event at the 1988 Winter Olympics.
