= Nobu Naruse =

Japanese cross-country skier (born 1984)

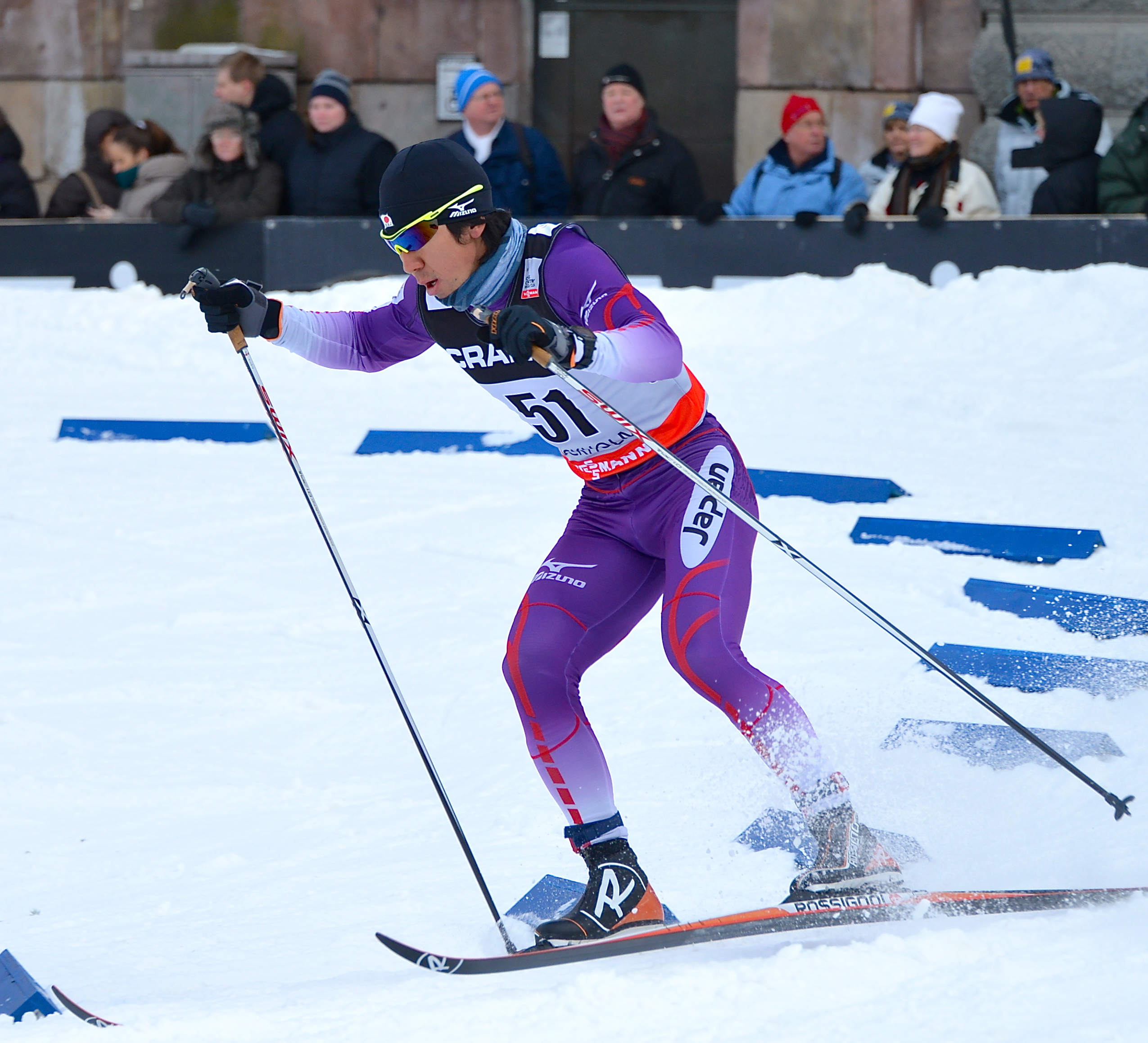

Medal record

Men's cross country skiing

Representing Japan

U23 World Championships
Bronze medal – third place	2007 Tarvisio	15 km freestyle

Asian Games
Silver medal – second place	2007 Changchun	4 × 10 km relay
Silver medal – second place	2011; Astana-Almaty	Team sprint
Silver medal – second place	2011; Astana-Almaty	15 km freestyle
Silver medal – second place	2011; Astana-Almaty	4 × 10 km relay

Nobu Naruse (成瀬 野生, Naruse Nobu) (born July 8, 1984) is a Japanese cross-country skier. He competed at the 2006 Winter Olympics in Turin. He represented Japan at the 2010 Winter Olympics in Vancouver.

Naruse's best finish at the Winter Olympics was 13th in the team sprint at Vancouver in 2010 while his best individual finish was 35th in the 50 km event.

He finished 52nd in the 15 km event at the FIS Nordic World Ski Championships 2007 in Sapporo.

His best World Cup finish was 13th at a 4 x 10 km relay at France in 2006 while his best individual finish was 26th in a 15 km event at Estonia in 2010.
