= Andrey Kondryshev =

Kazakhstani cross-country skier (born 1983)

Personal information
- Nationality: Kazakhstani
- Born: 24 August 1983 (age 42) Kostanay, Kazakhstan

Sport
- Sport: Cross-country skiing

Andrey Kondryshev (Андрей Юрьевич Кондрышев, born 24 August 1983) is a Kazakhstani cross-country skier. He competed in the men's 50 kilometre freestyle event at the 2006 Winter Olympics.
