= Wang Songtao =

Chinese cross-country skier

Personal information
- Nationality: Chinese
- Born: 28 December 1985 (age 39)

Sport
- Sport: Cross-country skiing

Wang Songtao (born 28 December 1985) is a Chinese cross-country skier. He competed in the men's 15 kilometre classical event at the 2006 Winter Olympics.
