= Wang Jinfen =

Chinese biathlete (born 1969)

Personal information
- Nationality: Chinese
- Born: 27 July 1969 (age 55)

Sport
- Sport: Biathlon

Wang Jinfen (Chinese: 王锦芬, born 27 July 1969) is a Chinese biathlete. She competed at the 1992 Winter Olympics and the 1994 Winter Olympics. She also competed in two cross-country skiing events at the 1988 Winter Olympics.

She is the older sister of teammate Wang Jinping.
