= Park Ki-ho =

South Korean cross-country skier

Personal information
- Nationality: South Korean
- Born: 24 November 1964 (age 60)

Sport
- Sport: Cross-country skiing

Park Ki-ho (born 24 November 1964) is a South Korean cross-country skier. He competed at the 1984 Winter Olympics and the 1988 Winter Olympics.
