= Olga Seleznyova =

Kazakhstani cross-country skier (born 1975)

Personal information
- Native name: Ольга Селезнёва
- Nationality: Kazakhstani
- Born: 7 June 1975 (age 49); Kostanay, Soviet Union

Sport
- Country: Kazakhstan
- Sport: Cross-country skiing
- Retired: 2005

Achievements and titles
- World finals: 2005 (World Championship)

Olga Selesnjowa ( Russian: Ольга Селезнёва), born June 7, 1975 in Qostanai) is a former Kazakh cross-country skier and biathlete.

Olga Selesnjowa was also active as a swimmer and gymnast at a national level. She initially competed in cross-country skiing. She made her international debut in 1996 in a FIS race in Yabuli. A year later, further races followed in Norway in the lower-class FIS Cross-Country Continental Cup, before the Kazakh competed in her first international championship in Trondheim as part of the FIS Nordic World Ski Championships. She finished 57th in the 5-kilometer classic, 55th in the pursuit and 48th in the 30-kilometer classic. After the World Championships, she made her debut in the Cross-Country Skiing World Cup in Falun. She did not finish in the points in her first 5-kilometer freestyle race, where she finished 74th, nor in the following four World Cup races. Her best result was 57th in the 30-kilometer freestyle in Oslo. The highlight of her career was her participation in the 1998 Winter Olympics in Nagano. Selesnjowa finished 66th in the 5-kilometer classic, 63rd in the pursuit and 52nd in the 30-kilometer freestyle. After the games, she only competed in lower-class races until 2001.

For the 2004-05 season, Selezneva switched to biathlon. She made her international debut at the 2005 Biathlon European Championships in Novosibirsk, where she finished 15th in the individual, 18th in the sprint and 20th in the pursuit. Her career ended at the 2005 Biathlon World Championships in Hochfilzen. The Kazakh came 76th in the individual, 83rd in the sprint, and 19th in the relay alongside Jelena Dubok, Tatjana Masunina, and Anna Lebedeva.
