= Svetlana Deshevykh =

Kazakhstani cross-country skier (born 1970)

Personal information
- Nationality: Kazakhstan
- Born: 30 November 1970 (age 55) Irkutsk, Soviet Union

Sport
- Sport: Skiing

World Cup career
- Seasons: 1997–1999, 2001–2002
- Indiv. starts: 20
- Indiv. podiums: 0
- Team starts: 4
- Team podiums: 0
- Overall titles: 0
- Discipline titles: 0

Svetlana Deshevykh (Светлана Владимировна Дешевых, born 30 November 1970) is a Kazakhstani cross-country skier. She competed at the 1998 Winter Olympics and the 2002 Winter Olympics.

== Cross-country skiing results ==
All results are sourced from the International Ski Federation (FIS).

=== Olympic Games ===
Year	Age	5 km	10 km	15 km	Pursuit	30 km	Sprint	4 × 5 km relay
1998	27	44	—N/a	20	38	21	—N/a	12
2002	31	—N/a	33	—	43	37	—	11

=== World Championships ===
Year	Age	5 km	10 km	15 km	Pursuit	30 km	Sprint	4 × 5 km relay
1997	26	46	—N/a	53	47	32	—N/a	12
2001	30	—N/a	28	21	—	CNX^{[a]}	—	9

a. ^{1} Cancelled due to extremely cold weather.

=== World Cup ===
==== Season standings ====
Season	Age			
Season	Age	Overall	Long Distance	Sprint
1997	26	NC	NC	—
1998	27	NC	NC	—
1999	28	NC	NC	—
2001	30	NC	—N/a	—
2002	31	NC	—N/a	NC
