= Hong Kun-pyo =

South Korean cross-country skier (born 1965)

Personal information
- Nationality: South Korean
- Born: 21 March 1965 (age 61)

Sport
- Sport: Cross-country skiing

Hong Kun-pyo (born 21 March 1965) is a South Korean cross-country skier. He competed in the men's 15 kilometre classical event at the 1988 Winter Olympics.
