= Li Geliang =

Chinese cross-country skier

Personal information
- Nationality: Chinese
- Born: 6 April 1981 (age 43)

Sport
- Sport: Cross-country skiing

Li Geliang (born 6 April 1981) is a Chinese cross-country skier. He competed in the men's 15 kilometre classical event at the 2006 Winter Olympics.
