= Kazunari Sasaki =

Japanese cross-country skier (born 1962)

Personal information
- Nationality: Japanese
- Born: 25 November 1962 (age 62); Aomori, Japan

Sport
- Sport: Cross-country skiing

Kazunari Sasaki (佐々木 一成, Sasaki Kazunari, born 25 November 1962) is a Japanese cross-country skier. He competed at the 1984, 1988, 1992 and the 1994 Winter Olympics.
