= Hou Yuxia =

Chinese skier (born 1979)

Personal information
- Nationality: Chinese
- Born: 20 May 1979 (age 47) People's Republic of China

Sport
- Sport: Biathlon

Hou Yuxia (born 20 May 1979) is a Chinese biathlete. She competed in three events at the 2006 Winter Olympics. She also competed in the cross-country skiing at the 2002 Winter Olympics.
