= Midori Furusawa =

Japanese cross-country skier (born 1974)

Personal information
- Nationality: Japanese
- Born: 28 April 1974 (age 52) Ōdate, Japan

Sport
- Sport: Cross-country skiing

Midori Furusawa (古澤 緑, Furusawa Midori; born 28 April 1974) is a Japanese cross-country skier. She competed at the 1998 Winter Olympics and the 2002 Winter Olympics.
