= Nobuko Fukuda =

Japanese cross-country skier (born 1980)

Nobuko Fukuda (福田 修子, Fukuda Nobuko) (born July 29, 1980) is a Japanese cross-country skier who has competed since 2000. Competing in three Winter Olympics, she earned her best finish of eighth in the team sprint at Turin in 2006. Fukuda's best individual finish was 24th in the individual sprint at those same games.

Fukuda's best finish at the FIS Nordic World Ski Championships was seventh in the 4 x 5 km relay at Liberec in 2009. Her best individual finish was 17th in the 15 km mass start at Val di Fiemme in 2003.

Fukuda's best World Cup finish was fifth in the 4 x 5 km relay at Switzerland in 2003. Her best individual World Cup finish was 15th three times between 2004 and 2008.
