= Oxana Yatskaya =

Kazakhstani cross-country skier (born 1978)

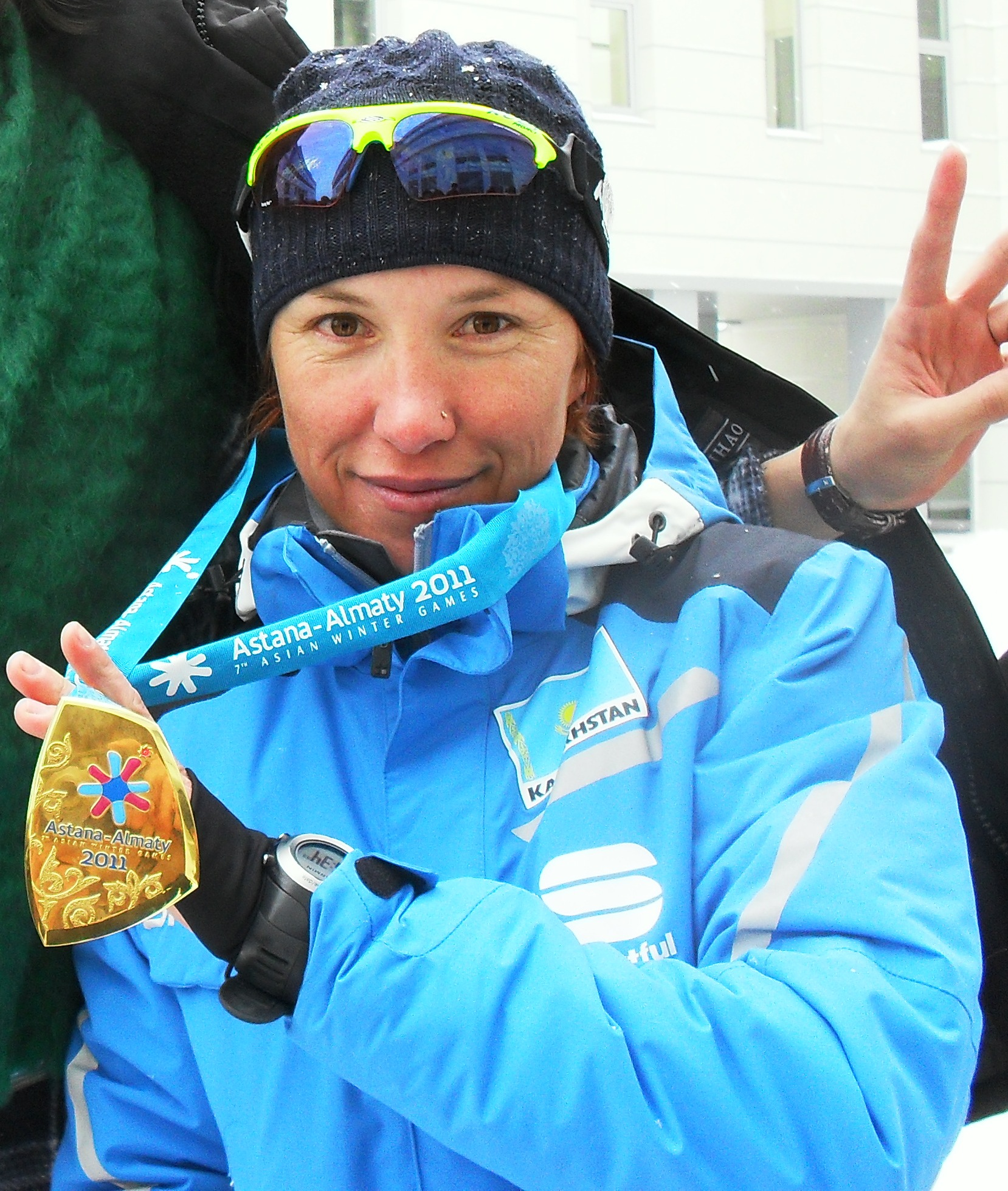

Medal record

Women's cross-country skiing

Representing Kazakhstan

Asian Winter Games
Gold medal – first place	1996 Harbin	5 km
Gold medal – first place	2003 Aomori	10 km
Gold medal – first place	2003 Aomori	4×5 km relay
Gold medal – first place	2007 Changchun	5 km
Gold medal – first place	2007 Changchun	4×5 km relay
Gold medal – first place	2011 Astana-Almaty	Team sprint
Gold medal – first place	2011 Astana-Almaty	4×5 km relay
Silver medal – second place	1996 Harbin	4×5 km relay
Silver medal – second place	2003 Aomori	5 km
Bronze medal – third place	2011 Astana-Almaty	Sprint

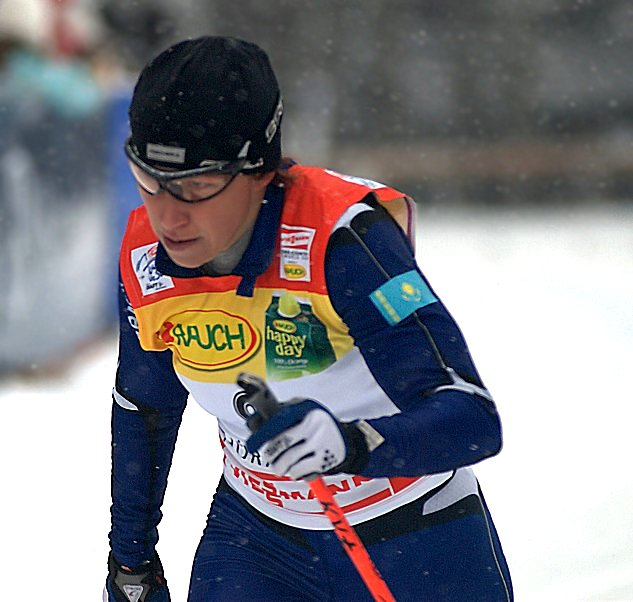
Oxana Yatskaya at Tour de Ski 2010

Oksana Yatskaya (born 22 September 1978 in Urzhar) is a Kazakhstani cross-country skier who has been competing since 1995. She finish fifth in the team sprint at the FIS Nordic World Ski Championships 2007 in Sapporo and earned her best individual finish of eighth in the 30 km event at the 2005 championships in Oberstdorf.

Yatskaya's best individual finish at the Winter Olympics was 15th twice (5 km + 5 km combined pursuit: 2002, 30 km: 2006).

She has a total of three individual FIS race victories up to 10 km since 1996. Yatskaya's best individual World Cup finish was sixth in a sprint event in February 2010 in Canada.
