= Elena Kolomina =

Kazakhstani cross-country skier (born 1981)

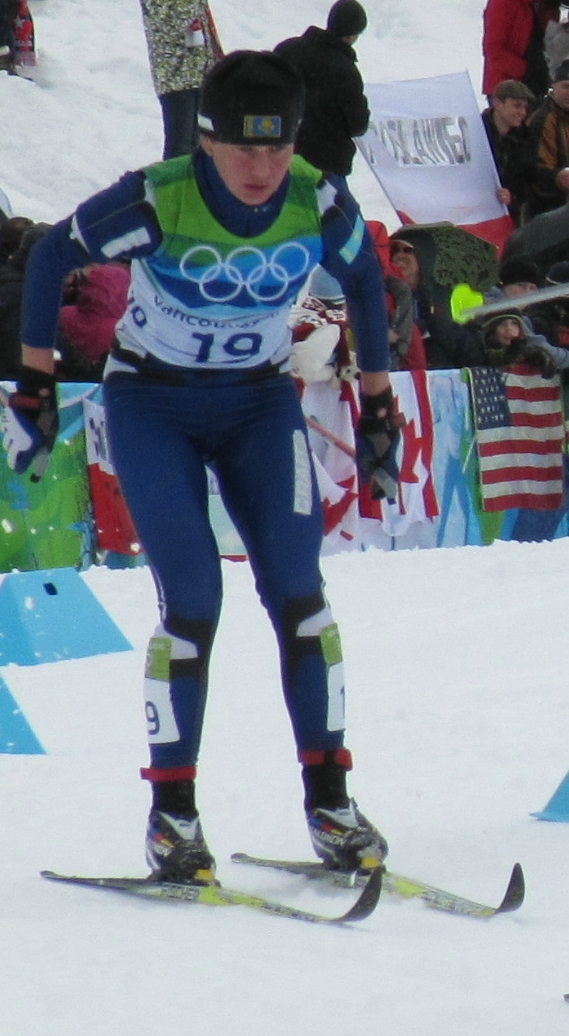
- Elena Kolomina in 2010

Personal information
- Nationality: Kazakhstan
- Born: 24 January 1981 (age 45) Ridder, Kazakh SSR, Soviet Union

Sport
- Sport: Skiing

World Cup career
- Seasons: 2001, 2003–2007, 2009–2017
- Indiv. starts: 148
- Indiv. podiums: 1
- Indiv. wins: 0
- Team starts: 27
- Team podiums: 0
- Overall titles: 0 – (47th in 2010)
- Discipline titles: 0
Medal record
Women's cross-country skiing
Representing Kazakhstan
Asian Games
Gold medal – first place	1999 Gangwon	4 × 5 km relay
Gold medal – first place	2007 Changchun	4 × 5 km relay
Gold medal – first place	2011 Astana-Almaty	Team sprint
Gold medal – first place	2011 Astana-Almaty	4 × 5 km relay
Silver medal – second place	2007 Changchun	Individual sprint
Silver medal – second place	2011 Astana-Almaty	15 km classical
Silver medal – second place	2017 Sapporo	Individual sprint
Silver medal – second place	2017 Sapporo	5 km classical
Bronze medal – third place	2017 Sapporo	10 km freestyle

Elena Vladimirovna Kolomina (Russian: Елена Владимировна Коломина) (born 24 January 1981, in Ridder) is a Kazakhstani cross-country skier who has been competing since 1998. She finished fifth in the team sprint at the FIS Nordic World Ski Championships 2007 in Sapporo and had her best individual finish of 21st in the sprint event at the 2001 championships in Lahti.

Kolomina's best individual finish at the Winter Olympics was 19th in the 30 km event at Turin in 2006.

Her best individual finish was second twice at various levels in the sprint event in 2007. Her best individual World Cup finish was seventh in a 15 km event in Canada in 2005.

== Cross-country skiing results ==
All results are sourced from the International Ski Federation (FIS).

=== Olympic Games ===
Year	Age	10 km individual	15 km skiathlon	30 km mass start	Sprint	4 × 5 km relay	Team sprint
2006	25	—	25	19	38	13	9
2010	29	27	28	33	36	9	11
2014	33	34	39	46	45	—	15
2018	37	63	54	33	55	—	—

=== World Championships ===
Year	Age	10 km	15 km	Pursuit	30 km	Sprint	4 × 5 km relay	Team sprint
2001	20	—	37	38	CNX (Note: Cancelled due to extremely cold weather.)	21	9	—N/a
2003	22	45	40	45	26	—	4	—N/a
2005	24	26	—N/a	29	35	36	7	—
2007	26	26	—N/a	34	34	48	11	5
2009	28	30	—N/a	25	35	59	10	—
2011	30	20	—N/a	23	34	41	11	—
2013	32	58	—N/a	53	—	—	15	—
2015	34	59	—N/a	42	37	—	—	12

=== World Cup ===
Season Standings
Season	Age	Discipline standings			Ski Tour standings			
Season	Age	Overall	Distance	Sprint	Nordic Opening	Tour de Ski	World Cup Final	Ski Tour Canada
2001	20	NC	—N/a	NC	—N/a	—N/a	—N/a	—N/a
2003	22	NC	—N/a	—	—N/a	—N/a	—N/a	—N/a
2004	23	NC	NC	NC	—N/a	—N/a	—N/a	—N/a
2005	24	87	56	NC	—N/a	—N/a	—N/a	—N/a
2006	25	52	39	52	—N/a	—N/a	—N/a	—N/a
2007	26	62	45	54	—N/a	31	—N/a	—N/a
2009	28	NC	NC	NC	—N/a	—	—	—N/a
2010	29	47	35	67	—N/a	18	—	—N/a
2011	30	62	46	NC	27	—	—	—N/a
2012	31	60	54	NC	41	26	—	—N/a
2013	32	101	NC	64	49	36	—	—N/a
2014	33	NC	NC	NC	63	—	—	—N/a
2015	34	NC	NC	NC	63	—	—N/a	—N/a
2016	35	NC	NC	NC	—	—	—N/a	—
2017	36	NC	NC	NC	—	—	—	—N/a

==== Individual podiums ====
- 1 podium – (1 SWC)

No.	Season	Date	Location	Race	Level	Place
1	2009–10	9 January 2010	Val di Fiemme, Italy	10 km Mass Start C	Stage World Cup	2nd
