= Guo Dongling =

Chinese skier (born 1973)

Personal information
- Nationality: Chinese
- Born: 13 December 1973 (age 51); Heilongjiang, China

Sport
- Sport: Cross-country skiing

Guo Dongling (born 13 December 1973) is a Chinese cross-country skier. She competed in three events at the 1998 Winter Olympics.
