= Beidahu, Jilin =

Ski resort in Jilin, China

Beidahu
- Interactive map of Beidahu
- Location: Jilin, China
- Nearest city: Jilin
- Coordinates: 43°25′07.45″N 126°36′56.33″E
- Top elevation: 1,359 m (4,459 ft)
- Base elevation: 537 m (1,762 ft)

Beidahu ski area (北大湖) is a downhill ski resort located outside of Jilin City in Jilin province, China.

It is the site of the 2007 Winter Asian Games in freestyle skiing, cross-country skiing, alpine skiing, snowboarding, and biathlon. In 2016, Beidahu joined forces with the Songhua Lake ski resort to jointly organize the 2016–17 ski season.
