= Sumiko Yokoyama =

Japanese cross-country skier (born 1974)

Medal record

Women's cross-country skiing

Representing Japan

Asian Winter Games
Gold medal – first place	1996 Harbin	10 km freestyle
Gold medal – first place	1999 Gangwon	5 km classical
Silver medal – second place	1996 Harbin	5 km classical
Silver medal – second place	1999 Gangwon	10 km freestyle
Silver medal – second place	1999 Gangwon	4 × 5 km relay

Junior World Championships
Silver medal – second place	1994 Breitenwang	4 × 5 km relay

Sumiko Yokoyama (横山 寿美子, Yokoyama Sumiko, born March 25, 1974) is a Japanese cross country skier who competed from 1993 to 2008. Her best World Cup finish was fifth in a 4 x 5 km relay in Switzerland in 2003.

Yokoyama also competed in four Winter Olympics, earning her best finish of tenth in the 4 x 5 km relay at Salt Lake City in 2002. Her best finish at the FIS Nordic World Ski Championships was 8th in the 4 x 5 km relay at Sapporo in 2007.
