= Luan Zhengrong =

Chinese skier

Personal information
- Nationality: Chinese
- Born: 7 April 1974 (age 50); Jilin, China

Sport
- Sport: Cross-country skiing

Luan Zhengrong (born 7 April 1974) is a Chinese cross-country skier. She competed at the 1998 Winter Olympics and the 2002 Winter Olympics.
