= Svetlana Malahova-Shishkina =

Kazakhstani cross-country skier (born 1977)

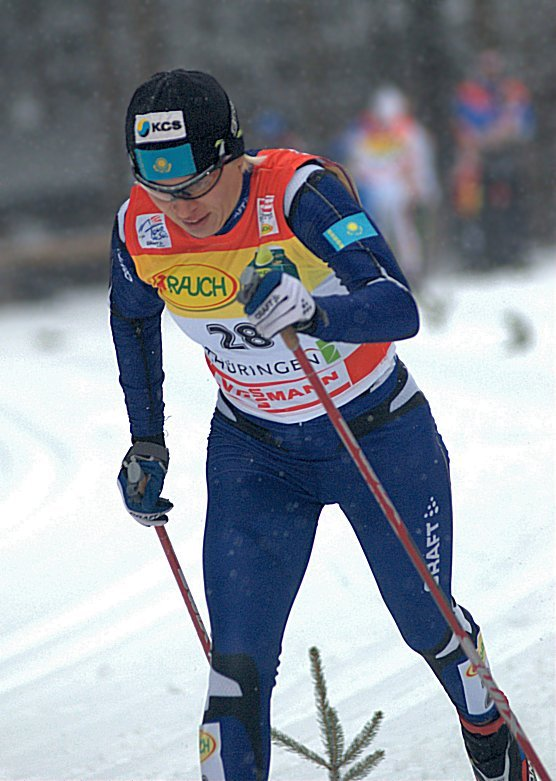

Medal record

Women's cross-country skiing

Representing Kazakhstan

Asian Winter Games
Gold medal – first place	1999 Gangwon	10 km
Gold medal – first place	1999 Gangwon	4×5 km relay
Gold medal – first place	2003 Aomori	5 km
Gold medal – first place	2003 Aomori	4×5 km relay
Gold medal – first place	2007 Changchun	4×5 km relay
Gold medal – first place	2011 Astana-Almaty	4×5 km relay
Silver medal – second place	1996 Harbin	4×5 km relay
Silver medal – second place	1999 Gangwon	5 km
Silver medal – second place	2003 Aomori	10 km
Silver medal – second place	2007 Changchun	5 km
Bronze medal – third place	2011 Astana-Almaty	15 km

Svetlana Malahova-Shishkina (born 27 March 1977) is a Kazakhstani cross country skier who has competed since 1995. Her best World Cup finish was third in a 10 km event in China in 2007.

Malahova-Shishkina also competed in four Winter Olympics, earning her best finish of 10th in the 4 x 5 km relay at Vancouver in 2010. Her best individual finish was 10th in the 10 km event at Vancouver in 2010.

Malahova-Shishkina's best finish at the FIS Nordic World Ski Championships was fourth in the 4 x 5 km relay at Val di Fiemme in 2003 while her best individual finish was seventh in the 10 km event at Oberstdorf in 2005.
