= 1986 Asian Winter Games =

Multi-sport event in Sapporo, Japan

I Asian Winter Games
- Host city: Sapporo, Japan
- Nations: 7
- Athletes: 293
- Events: 35 in 4 sports
- Opening: March 1, 1986
- Closing: March 8, 1986
- Opened by: Fahad Al-Ahmed Al-Jaber Al-Sabah; President of the Olympic Council of Asia
- Athlete's Oath: Yoshio Hoshino
- Main venue: Makomanai Indoor Stadium

Summer

Winter

The 1st Asian Winter Games (Japanese: 1986年アジア冬季競技大会, romanized: 1986-Nen Ajia tōkikyōgitaikai), also known as Sapporo 1986 (Japanese: 札幌1986), were held from March 1 to 8, 1986 in Sapporo, Japan. The Japanese Olympic Committee first suggested the idea of having a continent-wide winter version of the Asian Games in 1982. With Sapporo's expertise and infrastructure available after successfully hosting the 1972 Winter Olympics, the Olympic Council of Asia General Assembly in Seoul in 1984 decided to give Japan the privilege of hosting the first ever Asian Winter Games. Participating in a total of 35 events in seven sports were 430 athletes and officials from seven countries.

== Sports ==
A total of 35 events from 4 sports and 7 disciplines were held in the First Asian Winter Games. Large-hill (90m) Ski jumping was a demonstration sport.

- Alpine skiing (4) ()
- Biathlon (3) ()
- Cross-country skiing (6) ()
- Figure skating (4) ()
- Ice hockey (1) ()
- Short-track speed skating (8) ()
- Speed skating (9) ()

Demonstration sports

- Ski jumping (1) ()

== Participating nations ==
7 National Olympic Committees (NOC) entered teams in the 1986 Asian Winter Games. Below is a list of the nations with the number of competitors indicated in brackets.

- China (63)
- Hong Kong (4)
- India (14)
- Japan (92)
- Mongolia (4)
- North Korea (51)
- South Korea (65)

Number of athletes by National Olympic Committees (by highest to lowest)

IOC Letter Code	Country	Athletes
JPN	Japan	92
KOR	South Korea	65
CHN	China	63
PRK	North Korea	51
IND	India	14
HKG	Hong Kong	4
MGL	Mongolia	4

== Medal table ==
* Host nation (Japan)

Rank	Nation	Gold	Silver	Bronze	Total
1	Japan*	29	23	6	58
2	China	4	5	12	21
3	South Korea	1	5	12	18
4	North Korea	1	2	5	8
Totals (4 entries)		35	35	35	105

Preceded by Inaugural	Asian Winter Games; Sapporo; I Asian Winter Games (1986)	Succeeded by Sapporo
