= Cross-country skiing at the 2017 Asian Winter Games =

- Venue: Shirahatayama Open Stadium
- Dates: 20–26 February 2017
- Competitors: 68 from 14 nations

Cross-country skiing at the 2017 Asian Winter Games was held in Sapporo, Japan between 20–26 February at Shirahatayama Open Stadium. A total of ten events were contested, five for each gender.

== Schedule ==
Q	Qualification	F	Final

Event↓/Date →	20th Mon		21st Tue	22nd Wed	23rd Thu	24th Fri	25th Sat	26th Sun
Men's sprint classical	Q	F						
Men's 10 km classical					F			
Men's 15 km freestyle			F					
Men's 30 km freestyle								F
Men's 4 × 7.5 km relay						F		
Women's sprint classical	Q	F						
Women's 5 km classical					F			
Women's 10 km freestyle			F					
Women's 15 km freestyle								F
Women's 4 × 5 km relay						F		

== Medalists ==
=== Men ===
Event	Gold	Silver	Bronze
Sprint classical	Magnus Kim; South Korea	Sun Qinghai; China	Nobuhito Kashiwabara; Japan
10 km classical	Akira Lenting; Japan	Magnus Kim; South Korea	Kohei Shimizu; Japan
15 km freestyle	Rinat Mukhin; Kazakhstan	Naoto Baba; Japan	Akira Lenting; Japan
30 km freestyle	Akira Lenting; Japan	Sergey Cherepanov; Kazakhstan	Nikolay Chebotko; Kazakhstan
4 × 7.5 km relay	Japan; Nobuhito Kashiwabara; Kohei Shimizu; Naoto Baba; Akira Lenting	Kazakhstan; Sergey Cherepanov; Yerdos Akhmadiyev; Nikolay Chebotko; Rinat Mukhin	South Korea; Hwang Jun-ho; Park Seong-beom; Kim Min-woo; Magnus Kim

=== Women ===
Event	Gold	Silver	Bronze
Sprint classical	Man Dandan; China	Yelena Kolomina; Kazakhstan	Ju Hye-ri; South Korea
5 km classical	Yuki Kobayashi; Japan	Yelena Kolomina; Kazakhstan	Li Hongxue; China
10 km freestyle	Yuki Kobayashi; Japan	Lee Chae-won; South Korea	Yelena Kolomina; Kazakhstan
15 km freestyle	Yuki Kobayashi; Japan	Lee Chae-won; South Korea	Li Hongxue; China
4 × 5 km relay	Japan; Hikari Miyazaki; Kozue Takizawa; Yuki Kobayashi; Chisa Obayashi	China; Man Dandan; Li Xin; Chi Chunxue; Li Hongxue	South Korea; Je Sang-mi; Han Da-som; Ju Hye-ri; Lee Chae-won

== Medal table ==
Rank	Nation	Gold	Silver	Bronze	Total
1	Japan (JPN)	7	1	3	11
2	Kazakhstan (KAZ)	1	4	2	7
3	South Korea (KOR)	1	3	3	7
4	China (CHN)	1	2	2	5
Totals (4 entries)		10	10	10	30

== Participating nations ==
A total of 68 athletes from 14 nations competed in cross-country skiing at the 2017 Asian Winter Games:

- Australia (3)
- China (11)
- India (5)
- Japan (8)
- Kazakhstan (12)
- Kyrgyzstan (2)
- Lebanon (2)
- Mongolia (5)
- Nepal (1)
- Pakistan (4)
- South Korea (10)
- Sri Lanka (3)
- Thailand (1)
- Vietnam (1)

* Australia as guest nation, was ineligible to win any medals.
