= Japan at the 2017 Asian Winter Games =

- IOC code: JPN
- NOC: Japanese Olympic Committee
- Website: https://www.joc.or.jp

in Sapporo and Obihiro February 19–26
- Competitors: 146 in 5 sports
- Flag bearer: Go Tanaka
- Medals Ranked 1st: Gold 27 Silver 21 Bronze 26 Total 74

Asian Winter Games appearances
- 1986; 1990; 1996; 1999; 2003; 2007; 2011; 2017; 2025; 2029

Japan competed in the 2017 Asian Winter Games in Sapporo and Obihiro, Japan from February 19 to 26. This marked the fourth time the country has played host to the Asian Winter Games. Japan competed in all eleven disciplines from five sports. Ice hockey player Go Tanaka was the country's flagbearer during the parade of nations at the opening ceremony.

== Medal summary ==
=== Medal table ===
| Sport | Gold | Silver | Bronze | Total |
|---|---|---|---|---|
| Speed skating | 7 | 9 | 7 | 23 |
| Cross-country skiing | 7 | 1 | 3 | 11 |
| Alpine skiing | 3 | 2 | 2 | 7 |
| Freestyle skiing | 3 | 2 | 2 | 7 |
| Ski jumping | 3 | 2 | 0 | 5 |
| Snowboarding | 1 | 2 | 3 | 6 |
| Figure skating | 1 | 1 | 0 | 2 |
| Biathlon | 1 | 0 | 4 | 5 |
| Ice hockey | 1 | 0 | 1 | 2 |
| Short track speed skating | 0 | 1 | 3 | 4 |
| Curling | 0 | 1 | 1 | 2 |
| Totals (11 entries) | 27 | 21 | 26 | 74 |

=== Medalists ===
| Medal | Name | Sport | Event | Date |
|---|---|---|---|---|
| Gold | Eri Yanetani | Snowboarding | Women's giant slalom | 19 February |
| Gold | Nao Kodaira | Speed skating | Women's 1000 metres | 20 February |
| Gold | Miho Takagi | Speed skating | Women's 3000 metres | 20 February |
| Gold | Yuki Kobayashi | Cross-country skiing | Women's 10 kilometre freestyle | 21 February |
| Gold | Takuro Oda | Speed skating | Men's 1000 metres | 21 February |
| Gold | Nao Kodaira | Speed skating | Women's 500 metres | 21 February |
| Gold | Miho Takagi | Speed skating | Women's 1500 metres | 21 February |
| Gold | Misaki Oshigiri; Nana Takagi; Miho Takagi | Speed skating | Women's team pursuit | 21 February |
| Gold | Yohei Koyama | Alpine skiing | Men's giant slalom | 22 February |
| Gold | Yukiya Sato | Ski jumping | Normal hill individual | 22 February |
| Gold | Emi Hasegawa | Alpine skiing | Women's giant slalom | 23 February |
| Gold | Akira Lenting | Cross-country skiing | Men's 10 kilometre classical | 23 February |
| Gold | Yuki Kobayashi | Cross-country skiing | Women's 5 kilometre classical | 23 February |
| Gold | Miho Takagi | Speed skating | Women's mass start | 23 February |
| Gold | Mikito Tachizaki | Biathlon | Men's pursuit | 24 February |
| Gold | Nobuhito Kashiwabara; Kohei Shimizu; Naoto Baba; Akira Lenting | Cross-country skiing | Men's 4 × 7.5 kilometre relay | 24 February |
| Gold | Hikari Miyazaki; Kozue Takizawa; Yuki Kobayashi; Chisa Obayashi | Cross-country skiing | Women's 4 × 5 kilometre relay | 24 February |
| Gold | Ikuma Horishima | Freestyle skiing | Men's dual moguls | 24 February |
| Gold | Naoki Nakamura | Ski jumping | Large hill individual | 24 February |
| Gold | Emi Hasegawa | Alpine skiing | Women's slalom | 25 February |
| Gold | Yurie Adachi; Yoshino Enomoto; Moeko Fujimoto; Nana Fujimoto; Mika Hori; Akane Hosoyamada; Tomomi Iwahara; Shiori Koike; Mai Kondo; Akane Konishi; Hanae Kubo; Ami Nakamura; Shoko Ono; Chiho Osawa; Sena Suzuki; Aina Takeuchi; Naho Terashima; Ayaka Toko; Haruka Toko; Rui Ukita; Haruna Yoneyama | Ice hockey | Women's tournament | 25 February |
| Gold | Yuken Iwasa; Yukiya Sato; Naoki Nakamura; Masamitsu Ito | Ski jumping | Large hill team | 25 February |
| Gold | Akira Lenting | Cross-country skiing | Men's 30 kilometre freestyle | 26 February |
| Gold | Yuki Kobayashi | Cross-country skiing | Women's 15 kilometre freestyle | 26 February |
| Gold | Shoma Uno | Figure skating | Men's singles | 26 February |
| Gold | Ikuma Horishima | Freestyle skiing | Men's moguls | 26 February |
| Gold | Arisa Murata | Freestyle skiing | Women's moguls | 26 February |
| Silver | Yuya Suzuki | Snowboarding | Men's slalom | 20 February |
| Silver | Eri Yanetani | Snowboarding | Women's slalom | 20 February |
| Silver | Tsubasa Hasegawa | Speed skating | Men's 500 metres | 20 February |
| Silver | Ryosuke Tsuchiya | Speed skating | Men's 5000 metres | 20 February |
| Silver | Miho Takagi | Speed skating | Women's 1000 metres | 20 February |
| Silver | Naoto Baba | Cross-country skiing | Men's 15 kilometre freestyle | 21 February |
| Silver | Ayuko Ito | Short track speed skating | Women's 500 metres | 21 February |
| Silver | Misaki Oshigiri | Speed skating | Women's 1500 metres | 21 February |
| Silver | Yuken Iwasa | Ski jumping | Normal hill individual | 22 February |
| Silver | Ryosuke Tsuchiya | Speed skating | Men's 10000 metres | 22 February |
| Silver | Shota Nakamura; Shane Williamson; Ryosuke Tsuchiya | Speed skating | Men's team pursuit | 22 February |
| Silver | Asa Ando | Alpine skiing | Women's giant slalom | 23 February |
| Silver | Takuro Oda | Speed skating | Men's 1500 metres | 23 February |
| Silver | Shane Williamson | Speed skating | Men's mass start | 23 February |
| Silver | Ayano Sato | Speed skating | Women's mass start | 23 February |
| Silver | Yusuke Morozumi; Tetsuro Shimizu; Tsuyoshi Yamaguchi; Kosuke Morozumi; Kosuke Hirata | Curling | Men's team | 24 February |
| Silver | Chris Reed; Kana Muramoto | Figure skating | Ice dancing | 24 February |
| Silver | Daichi Hara | Freestyle skiing | Men's dual moguls | 24 February |
| Silver | Arisa Murata | Freestyle skiing | Women's dual moguls | 24 February |
| Silver | Yuken Iwasa | Ski jumping | Large hill individual | 24 February |
| Silver | Asa Ando | Alpine skiing | Women's slalom | 25 February |
| Bronze | Shinnosuke Kamino | Snowboarding | Men's giant slalom | 19 February |
| Bronze | Nobuhito Kashiwabara | Cross-country skiing | Men's sprint classical | 20 February |
| Bronze | Seitaro Ichinohe | Speed skating | Men's 5000 metres | 20 February |
| Bronze | Ayano Sato | Speed skating | Women's 3000 metres | 20 February |
| Bronze | Akira Lenting | Cross-country skiing | Men's 15 kilometre freestyle | 21 February |
| Bronze | Shunsuke Nakamura | Speed skating | Men's 1000 metres | 21 February |
| Bronze | Arisa Go | Speed skating | Women's 500 metres | 21 February |
| Bronze | Hideyuki Narita | Alpine skiing | Men's giant slalom | 22 February |
| Bronze | Keita Watanabe | Short track speed skating | Men's 1000 metres | 22 February |
| Bronze | Sumire Kikuchi | Short track speed skating | Women's 1000 metres | 22 February |
| Bronze | Hiroki Yokoyama; Kazuki Yoshinaga; Keita Watanabe; Ryosuke Sakazume; Takayuki Muratake | Short track speed skating | Men's 5000 metres relay | 22 February |
| Bronze | Seitaro Ichinohe | Speed skating | Men's 10000 metres | 22 February |
| Bronze | Mai Kiyama | Speed skating | Women's 5000 metres | 22 February |
| Bronze | Mikito Tachizaki | Biathlon | Men's sprint | 23 February |
| Bronze | Kohei Shimizu | Cross-country skiing | Men's 10 kilometre classical | 23 February |
| Bronze | Taro Kondo | Speed skating | Men's 1500 metres | 23 February |
| Bronze | Satsuki Fujisawa; Mari Motohashi; Chinami Yoshida; Yurika Yoshida; Yumi Suzuki | Curling | Women's team | 24 February |
| Bronze | Miki Itō | Freestyle skiing | Women's dual moguls | 24 February |
| Bronze | Hideyuki Narita | Alpine skiing | Men's slalom | 25 February |
| Bronze | Fuyuko Tachizaki; Yurie Tanaka; Mikito Tachizaki; Tsukasa Kobonoki | Biathlon | Mixed relay | 25 February |
| Bronze | Ayumu Nedefuji | Snowboarding | Men's halfpipe | 25 February |
| Bronze | Kurumi Imai | Snowboarding | Women's halfpipe | 25 February |
| Bronze | Kosuke Ozaki | Biathlon | Men's mass start | 26 February |
| Bronze | Fuyuko Tachizaki | Biathlon | Women's mass start | 26 February |
| Bronze | Miki Itō | Freestyle skiing | Women's moguls | 26 February |
| Bronze | Yutaka Fukufuji; Yuto Ito; Takuto Onoda; Yōsuke Haga; Ryo Hashiba; Ryo Hashimoto; Keigo Minoshima; Kazumasa Sasaki; Hiroto Sato; Takafumi Yamashita; Maruru Furuhashi; Yushiroh Hirano; Takuma Kawai; Shuhei Kuji; Masahito Nishiwaki; Daisuke Obara; Kenta Takagi; Seiji Takahashi; Hiromichi Terao; Yuri Terao; Go Tanaka; Hiroki Ueno; Takuro Yamashita | Ice hockey | Men's tournament | 26 February |

== Competitors ==
The following table lists the Japanese delegation per sport and gender.

| Sport | Men | Women | Total |
|---|---|---|---|
| Alpine skiing | 4 | 4 | 8 |
| Biathlon | 6 | 6 | 12 |
| Cross-country skiing | 4 | 4 | 8 |
| Curling | 5 | 5 | 10 |
| Figure skating | 6 | 6 | 12 |
| Freestyle skiing | 4 | 4 | 8 |
| Ice hockey | 23 | 21 | 44 |
| Short track speed skating | 5 | 5 | 10 |
| Ski jumping | 4 | —N/a | 4 |
| Snowboarding | 4 | 6 | 10 |
| Speed skating | 10 | 10 | 20 |
| Total | 75 | 71 | 146 |

== Alpine skiing ==
Japan's alpine skiing team will consist of eight athletes (four men and four women). The team was announced on January 19, 2017.

Men

- Naoki Yuasa
- Hideyuki Narita
- Yohei Koyama
- Tatsuki Matsumoto

Women

- Emi Hasegawa
- Mio Arai
- Asa Ando
- Emiko Kiyosawa

== Biathlon ==
Men

- Junji Nagai
- Mikito Tachizaki
- Yuuki Nakajima
- Tsukasa Kobonoki
- Kosuke Ozaki
- Takuto Terabayashi

Women

- Fuyuko Tachizaki
- Yurie Tanaka
- Rina Mitsuhashi
- Sari Furuya
- Asuka Hachisuka
- Kirari Tanaka

== Cross-country skiing ==
Japan's cross-country skiing team will consist of eight athletes (four men and four women). The team was announced on January 19, 2017.

Men

- Akira Lenting
- Nobuhito Kashiwabara
- Naoto Baba
- Kohei Shimizu

Women

- Yuki Kobayashi
- Hikari Miyazaki
- Chisa Obayashi
- Kozue Takizawa

== Curling ==
Japan has entered both a men's and women's teams.

=== Men's tournament ===
Japan's men's curling team consists of five athletes.

- Yusuke Morozumi – skip
- Tetsuro Shimizu – third
- Tsuyoshi Yamaguchi – second
- Kosuke Morozumi – lead
- Koshuke Hirata – alternate

Key
| Teams to playoffs |

| Country | Skip | W | L |
|---|---|---|---|
| China | Liu Rui | 5 | 0 |
| South Korea | Kim Soo-hyuk | 4 | 1 |
| Japan | Yusuke Morozumi | 3 | 2 |
| Chinese Taipei | Randolph Shen | 2 | 3 |
| Kazakhstan | Viktor Kim | 1 | 4 |
| Qatar | Nabeel Alyafei | 0 | 5 |

Round-robin

Japan has a bye in draw 3

Draw 1

Saturday, February 18, 9:00

| Sheet A | 1 | 2 | 3 | 4 | 5 | 6 | 7 | 8 | 9 | 10 | Final |
|---|---|---|---|---|---|---|---|---|---|---|---|
| Japan (Morozumi) | 0 | 2 | 0 | 0 | 6 | 0 | 3 | X | X | X | 11 |
| Chinese Taipei (Shen) | 1 | 0 | 1 | 0 | 0 | 1 | 0 | X | X | X | 3 |

Draw 2

Saturday, February 18, 18:00

| Sheet B | 1 | 2 | 3 | 4 | 5 | 6 | 7 | 8 | 9 | 10 | Final |
|---|---|---|---|---|---|---|---|---|---|---|---|
| Japan (Morozumi) | 1 | 2 | 4 | 3 | 4 | 5 | 0 | X | X | X | 19 |
| Qatar (Alyafei) | 0 | 0 | 0 | 0 | 0 | 0 | 1 | X | X | X | 1 |

Draw 4

Monday, February 20, 13:30

| Sheet A | 1 | 2 | 3 | 4 | 5 | 6 | 7 | 8 | 9 | 10 | Final |
|---|---|---|---|---|---|---|---|---|---|---|---|
| China (Rui) | 2 | 0 | 2 | 1 | 0 | 0 | 1 | 0 | 2 | 1 | 9 |
| Japan (Morozumi) | 0 | 2 | 0 | 0 | 1 | 1 | 0 | 2 | 0 | 0 | 6 |

Draw 5

Tuesday, February 21, 9:00

| Sheet C | 1 | 2 | 3 | 4 | 5 | 6 | 7 | 8 | 9 | 10 | Final |
|---|---|---|---|---|---|---|---|---|---|---|---|
| Kazakhstan (Kim) | 0 | 0 | 1 | 0 | 0 | 0 | 3 | 0 | X | X | 4 |
| Japan (Morozumi) | 3 | 3 | 0 | 2 | 1 | 1 | 0 | 3 | X | X | 13 |

Draw 6

Tuesday, February 21, 18:00

| Sheet C | 1 | 2 | 3 | 4 | 5 | 6 | 7 | 8 | 9 | 10 | Final |
|---|---|---|---|---|---|---|---|---|---|---|---|
| Japan (Morozumi) | 0 | 1 | 0 | 0 | 2 | 0 | 1 | 0 | X | X | 4 |
| South Korea (Soo-hyuk) | 2 | 0 | 2 | 1 | 0 | 2 | 0 | 1 | X | X | 8 |

Semifinals

Wednesday, February 22, 1:30

| Sheet A | 1 | 2 | 3 | 4 | 5 | 6 | 7 | 8 | 9 | 10 | Final |
|---|---|---|---|---|---|---|---|---|---|---|---|
| Japan (Morozumi) | 1 | 1 | 0 | 1 | 0 | 2 | 0 | 0 | 0 | 1 | 6 |
| South Korea (Soo-hyuk) | 0 | 0 | 1 | 0 | 2 | 0 | 2 | 0 | 0 | 0 | 5 |

Gold medal match

Friday, February 24, 1:30

| Sheet C | 1 | 2 | 3 | 4 | 5 | 6 | 7 | 8 | 9 | 10 | Final |
|---|---|---|---|---|---|---|---|---|---|---|---|
| China (Rui) (gold) | 0 | 1 | 0 | 3 | 3 | 2 | 0 | 2 | X | X | 11 |
| Japan (Morozumi) (silver) | 1 | 0 | 1 | 0 | 0 | 0 | 2 | 0 | X | X | 4 |

=== Women's tournament ===
- Satsuki Fujisawa – Skip
- Mari Motohashi – Third
- Chinami Yoshida – Second
- Yurika Yoshida – Lead
- Yumi Suzuki – Alternate

Key
| Teams to playoffs |

| Country | Skip | W | L |
|---|---|---|---|
| South Korea | Kim Eun-jung | 4 | 0 |
| China | Wang Bingyu | 3 | 1 |
| Japan | Satsuki Fujisawa | 2 | 2 |
| Kazakhstan | Ramina Yunicheva | 1 | 3 |
| Qatar | Maryam Binali | 0 | 4 |

Round-robin

Japan has a bye in draw 3

Draw 1

Saturday, February 18, 13:30

| Sheet A | 1 | 2 | 3 | 4 | 5 | 6 | 7 | 8 | 9 | 10 | Final |
|---|---|---|---|---|---|---|---|---|---|---|---|
| Japan (Fujisawa) | 2 | 3 | 1 | 0 | 4 | 3 | 2 | 2 | X | X | 17 |
| Qatar (Binali) | 0 | 0 | 0 | 1 | 0 | 0 | 0 | 0 | X | X | 1 |

Draw 2

Saturday, February 19, 9:00

| Sheet B | 1 | 2 | 3 | 4 | 5 | 6 | 7 | 8 | 9 | 10 | Final |
|---|---|---|---|---|---|---|---|---|---|---|---|
| Kazakhstan (Yunicheva) | 1 | 0 | 0 | 0 | 0 | 1 | 0 | 1 | 0 | X | 3 |
| Japan (Fujisawa) | 0 | 4 | 1 | 3 | 2 | 0 | 2 | 0 | 5 | X | 17 |

Draw 4

Monday, February 20, 18:00

| Sheet C | 1 | 2 | 3 | 4 | 5 | 6 | 7 | 8 | 9 | 10 | Final |
|---|---|---|---|---|---|---|---|---|---|---|---|
| Japan (Fujisawa) | 0 | 1 | 1 | 0 | 0 | 1 | 0 | 0 | 2 | 0 | 5 |
| South Korea (Eun-jung) | 1 | 0 | 0 | 1 | 2 | 0 | 1 | 1 | 0 | 1 | 7 |

Draw 5

Tuesday, February 21, 13:30

| Sheet C | 1 | 2 | 3 | 4 | 5 | 6 | 7 | 8 | 9 | 10 | Final |
|---|---|---|---|---|---|---|---|---|---|---|---|
| China (Wang) | 0 | 0 | 0 | 0 | 0 | 0 | 0 | 0 | 0 | 0 | 0 |
| Japan (Fujisawa) | 0 | 0 | 0 | 0 | 0 | 0 | 0 | 0 | 0 | 0 | 0 |

== Figure skating ==
Japan's figure skating team consists of twelve athletes. On February 7, 2017, it was announced that Kaori Sakamoto would replace Satoko Miyahara, because the latter had sustained an injury to her hip.

Singles

| Athlete | Event | SP | | FP | | Total | |
| Athlete | Event | Points | Rank | Points | Rank | Points | Rank |
|---|---|---|---|---|---|---|---|
| Shoma Uno | Men's | 92.43 | 2 | 188.84 | 1 | 281.27 | 1st place, gold medalist(s) |
| Takahito Mura | Men's | 90.32 | 4 | 172.99 | 4 | 263.31 | 4 |
| Kaori Sakamoto | Women's | WD | | | | | |
| Rika Hongo | Women's | 60.98 | 2 | 100.39 | 4 | 161.37 | 4 |

Mixed

| Athlete(s) | Event | SP/SD | | FP/FD | | Total | |
| Athlete(s) | Event | Points | Rank | Points | Rank | Points | Rank |
|---|---|---|---|---|---|---|---|
| Miu Suzaki / Ryuichi Kihara | Pairs | WD | | | | | |
| Narumi Takahashi / Ryo Shibata | Pairs | 48.78 | 5 | 81.75 | 6 | 130.53 | 5 |
| Kana Muramoto / Chris Reed | Ice dancing | 64.74 | 2 | 94.40 | 2 | 159.14 | 2nd place, silver medalist(s) |
| Ibuki Mori / Kentaro Suzuki | Ice dancing | 48.84 | 5 | 75.28 | 5 | 124.12 | 5 |

== Freestyle skiing ==
Japan's freestyle skiing team will consist of eight athletes (four men and four women). The team was announced on January 19, 2017.

Men

- Sho Endo
- Daichi Hara
- Ikuma Horishima
- Kosuke Sugimoto

Women

- Miki Ito
- Arisa Murata
- Kisara Sumiyoshi
- Hinako Tomitaka

== Ice hockey ==
Japan as the host nation has entered teams in both hockey tournaments. The men's team will compete in the top division.

=== Men's tournament ===
Japan was represented by the following 23 athletes:

- Yutaka Fukufuji (G)
- Yuto Ito (G)
- Takuto Onoda (G)
- Yosuke Haga (D)
- Ryo Hashiba (D)
- Ryo Hashimoto (D)
- Keigo Minoshima (D)
- Kazumasa Sasaki (D)
- Hiroto Sato (D)
- Takafumi Yamashita (D)
- Maruru Furuhashi (D)
- Yushiroh Hirano (F)
- Takuma Kawai (F)
- Shuhei Kuji (F)
- Masahito Nishiwaki (F)
- Daisuke Obara (F)
- Kenta Takagi (F)
- Seiji Takahashi (F)
- Hiromichi Terao (F)
- Yuri Terao (F)
- Go Tanaka (F)
- Hiroki Ueno (F)
- Takuro Yamashita (F)

Legend

- G– Goalie D = Defense F = Forward

| Rank | Team | Pld | W | OW | OL | L | GF | GA | GD | Pts |
|---|---|---|---|---|---|---|---|---|---|---|
| 1st place, gold medalist(s) | Kazakhstan | 3 | 3 | 0 | 0 | 0 | 19 | 0 | +19 | 9 |
| 2nd place, silver medalist(s) | South Korea | 3 | 2 | 0 | 0 | 1 | 14 | 6 | +8 | 6 |
| 3rd place, bronze medalist(s) | Japan | 3 | 1 | 0 | 0 | 2 | 15 | 11 | +4 | 3 |
| 4 | China | 3 | 0 | 0 | 0 | 3 | 0 | 32 | –32 | 0 |

| 22 February 2017; 19:00 | Japan | 14–0 (5–0, 4–0, 5–0) | China | Tsukisamu Gymnasium; Attendance: 1,197 |

Game reference
| 8 min | Penalties | 14 min |
| 59 | Shots | 9 |

| 24 February 2017; 19:00 | Japan | 1–4 (0–1, 0–1, 1–2) | South Korea | Tsukisamu Gymnasium; Attendance: 2,118 |

Game reference
| 8 min | Penalties | 6 min |
| 28 | Shots | 32 |

| 26 February 2017; 12:30 | Kazakhstan | 7–0 (4–0, 2–0, 1–0) | Japan | Tsukisamu Gymnasium; Attendance: 1,631 |

Game reference
| 6 min | Penalties | 20 min |
| 41 | Shots | 12 |

=== Women's tournament ===
Japan was represented by the following 21 athletes:

- Yurie Adachi
- Yoshino Enomoto (F)
- Moeko Fujimoto (F)
- Nana Fujimoto (G)
- Mika Hori (D)
- Akane Hosoyamada (D)
- Tomomi Iwahara (F)
- Shiori Koike (D)
- Mai Kondo (G)
- Akane Konishi (G)
- Hanae Kubo (F)
- Ami Nakamura (F)
- Shoko Ono (F)
- Chiho Osawa (F)
- Sena Suzuki (D)
- Aina Takeuchi (D)
- Naho Terashima (F)
- Ayaka Toko (D)
- Haruka Toko (F)
- Rui Ukita (F)
- Haruna Yoneyama (F)

Legend: G = Goalie, D = Defense, F = Forward

| Rank | Team | Pld | W | OW | OL | L | GF | GA | GD | Pts |
|---|---|---|---|---|---|---|---|---|---|---|
| 1st place, gold medalist(s) | Japan | 5 | 5 | 0 | 0 | 0 | 98 | 1 | +97 | 15 |
| 2nd place, silver medalist(s) | China | 5 | 3 | 0 | 1 | 1 | 46 | 12 | +34 | 10 |
| 3rd place, bronze medalist(s) | Kazakhstan | 5 | 3 | 0 | 0 | 2 | 31 | 14 | +17 | 9 |
| 4 | South Korea | 5 | 2 | 1 | 0 | 2 | 37 | 6 | +31 | 8 |
| 5 | Thailand | 5 | 1 | 0 | 0 | 4 | 5 | 84 | –79 | 3 |
| 6 | Hong Kong | 5 | 0 | 0 | 0 | 5 | 4 | 104 | –100 | 0 |

| 18 February 2017; 12:00 | Kazakhstan | 0–6 (0–2, 0–3, 0–1) | Japan | Tsukisamu Gymnasium; Attendance: 2,200 |

Game reference
| | | | Referee: (Germany) Tijana Haack; Linesmen: (Austria) Julia Kainberger (South Korea) Lee Tae-ri |
| 12 min | Penalties | 4 min | Referee: (Germany) Tijana Haack; Linesmen: (Austria) Julia Kainberger (South Korea) Lee Tae-ri |
| 3 | Shots | 58 | Referee: (Germany) Tijana Haack; Linesmen: (Austria) Julia Kainberger (South Korea) Lee Tae-ri |

| 20 February 2017; 19:00 | Japan | 3–0 (1–0, 0–0, 2–0) | South Korea | Tsukisamu Gymnasium; Attendance: 1,221 |

Game reference
| 12 min | Penalties | 6 min |
| 47 | Shots | 19 |

| 21 February 2017; 19:00 | Japan | 46–0 (17–0, 18–0, 11–0) | Hong Kong | Tsukisamu Gymnasium; Attendance: 513 |

Game reference
| 0 min | Penalties | 2 min |
| 158 | Shots | 0 |

| 23 February 2017; 19:00 | Thailand | 0–37 (0–18, 0–13, 0–6) | Japan | Tsukisamu Gymnasium; Attendance: 348 |

Game reference
| 10 min | Penalties | 0 min |
| 0 | Shots | 150 |

| 25 February 2017; 19:00 | Japan | 6–1 (5–0, 0–1, 1–0) | China | Tsukisamu Gymnasium; Attendance: 1,807 |

Game reference
| 4 min | Penalties | 8 min |
| 70 | Shots | 3 |

== Short track speed skating ==
Japan's speed skating team consists of 10 athletes (five men and five women). The team was officially unveiled on January 9, 2017.

Men

- Keita Watanabe
- Ryosuke Sakazume
- Kazuki Yoshinaga
- Hiroki Yokoyama
- Takayuki Muratake

Women

- Moemi Kikuchi
- Hitomi Saito
- Sumire Kikuchi
- Ayuko Ito
- Aoi Watanabe

== Ski jumping ==
Japan's ski jumping team will consist of four athletes (all men, as women's events are not scheduled to be held). The team was announced on January 19, 2017.

Men

- Yukiya Satō
- Naoki Nakamura
- Masamitsu Itō
- Yūken Iwasa

== Snowboarding ==
Japan's snowboarding team will consist of ten athletes (four men and six women). The team was announced on January 19, 2017.

Men

- Ayumu Nedefuji - halfpipe
- Shinnosuke Kamino - slalom/giant slalom
- Yuya Suzuki - slalom/giant slalom
- Takumi Miyazawa - slalom/giant slalom

Women

- Hikaru Oe - halfpipe
- Haruna Matsumoto - halfpipe
- Kurumi Imai - halfpipe
- Sena Tomita - halfpipe
- Eri Yanetani - slalom/giant slalom
- Asa Toyoda - slalom/giant slalom

== Speed skating ==
Japan's speed skating team consists of 20 athletes (ten men and ten women). The team was officially unveiled on January 15, 2017.

Men

- Takuro Oda - 1000 m, 1500 m
- Shota Nakamura - 1500 m, 1000 m, TP MS
- Ryosuke Tsuchiya - 5000 m, 10000 m, TP MS
- Shane Williamson 1500 m, 5000 m, 10000 m, TP, MS
- Seitaro Ichinohe 5000 m, 10000 m, TP (sub)
- Taro Kondo 1500 m
- Yuto Fujino 500 m, 1000 m
- Tsubasa Hasegawa 500 m
- Shunsuke Nakamura 500 m, 1000 m
- Yuma Murakami 500 m

Women

- Nao Kodaira 500 m, 1000 m
- Miho Takagi 1000 m, 1500 m, 3000 m, TP, MS
- Mai Kiyama 5000 m
- Misaki Oshigiri 1500 m, 3000 m, TP
- Nana Takagi 1,500 m, TP, MS
- Ayano Sato 500 m, 1500 m, 3000 m, MS
- Arisa Go 500 m, 1000 m
- Maki Tabata 5000 m
- Maki Tsuji 500 m, 1000 m
- Fuyo Matsuoka 5000 m
