= Alpine skiing at the 2017 Asian Winter Games =

- Venue: Sapporo Teine
- Dates: 22–25 February 2017
- Competitors: 83 from 19 nations

Alpine skiing at the 2017 Asian Winter Games was held in Sapporo, Japan between 22–25 February at Sapporo Teine. A total of four events were contested: men's and women's giant slalom and slalom.

== Schedule ==
F	Final

Event↓/Date →	22nd Wed	23rd Thu	24th Fri	25th Sat
Men's slalom				F
Men's giant slalom	F			
Women's slalom				F
Women's giant slalom		F		

== Medalists ==
=== Men ===
Event	Gold	Silver	Bronze
Slalom	Jung Dong-hyun; South Korea	Kim Hyeon-tae; South Korea	Hideyuki Narita; Japan
Giant slalom	Yohei Koyama; Japan	Kim Hyeon-tae; South Korea	Hideyuki Narita; Japan

=== Women ===
Event	Gold	Silver	Bronze
Slalom	Emi Hasegawa; Japan	Asa Ando; Japan	Kang Young-seo; South Korea
Giant slalom	Emi Hasegawa; Japan	Asa Ando; Japan	Kang Young-seo; South Korea

== Medal table ==
Rank	Nation	Gold	Silver	Bronze	Total
1	Japan (JPN)	3	2	2	7
2	South Korea (KOR)	1	2	2	5
Totals (2 entries)		4	4	4	12

== Participating nations ==
A total of 83 athletes from 19 nations competed in alpine skiing at the 2017 Asian Winter Games:

- Australia (2)
- China (11)
- Chinese Taipei (3)
- India (9)
- Iran (4)
- Japan (7)
- Jordan (2)
- Kazakhstan (4)
- Kyrgyzstan (4)
- Lebanon (4)
- Malaysia (2)
- Mongolia (4)
- Nepal (2)
- Pakistan (8)
- South Korea (9)
- Tajikistan (4)
- Thailand (1)
- Timor-Leste (1)
- Vietnam (2)

* Australia as guest nation, was ineligible to win any medals.
