= Alpine skiing at the 2017 Asian Winter Games – Men's giant slalom =

Men's giant slalom at the 2017 Asian Winter Games
- Venue: Sapporo Teine
- Dates: 22 February 2017
- Competitors: 44 from 18 nations

Medalists
| gold medal | Yohei Koyama | Japan |
| silver medal | Kim Hyeon-tae | South Korea |
| bronze medal | Hideyuki Narita | Japan |

The men's giant slalom at the 2017 Asian Winter Games was held on 22 February 2017 at the Sapporo Teine, Japan.

== Schedule ==
All times are Japan Standard Time (UTC+09:00)

| Date | Time | Event |
|---|---|---|
| Wednesday, 22 February 2017 | 10:30 | 1st run |
| Wednesday, 22 February 2017 | 13:15 | 2nd run |

== Results ==
Legend

- DNF — Did not finish
- DSQ — Disqualified

| Rank | Athlete | 1st run | 2nd run | Total |
|---|---|---|---|---|
| 1st place, gold medalist(s) | Yohei Koyama (JPN) | 1:08.00 | 1:09.51 | 2:17.51 |
| 2nd place, silver medalist(s) | Kim Hyeon-tae (KOR) | 1:08.68 | 1:10.69 | 2:19.37 |
| 3rd place, bronze medalist(s) | Hideyuki Narita (JPN) | 1:08.98 | 1:11.26 | 2:20.24 |
| 4 | Jung Dong-hyun (KOR) | 1:09.78 | 1:10.90 | 2:20.68 |
| 5 | Tatsuki Matsumoto (JPN) | 1:09.44 | 1:11.42 | 2:20.86 |
| 6 | Igor Zakurdayev (KAZ) | 1:11.54 | 1:11.09 | 2:22.63 |
| 7 | Liam Michael (AUS) | 1:11.27 | 1:12.35 | 2:23.62 |
| 8 | Evgeniy Timofeev (KGZ) | 1:10.93 | 1:13.10 | 2:24.03 |
| 9 | Mohammad Kiadarbandsari (IRI) | 1:10.91 | 1:13.80 | 2:24.71 |
| 10 | Hossein Saveh-Shemshaki (IRI) | 1:12.24 | 1:13.54 | 2:25.78 |
| 11 | Zakhar Kuchin (KAZ) | 1:12.51 | 1:15.07 | 2:27.58 |
| 12 | Cong Liang (CHN) | 1:12.85 | 1:15.63 | 2:28.48 |
| 13 | Xu Mingfu (CHN) | 1:13.90 | 1:15.67 | 2:29.57 |
| 14 | Yohan Goutt Gonçalves (TLS) | 1:16.59 | 1:17.83 | 2:34.42 |
| 15 | Jeffrey Webb (MAS) | 1:18.24 | 1:17.75 | 2:35.99 |
| 16 | Maxim Gordeev (KGZ) | 1:17.61 | 1:19.67 | 2:37.28 |
| 17 | Raoul Al-Asmar (LBN) | 1:19.19 | 1:20.67 | 2:39.86 |
| 18 | Hira Lal (IND) | 1:18.38 | 1:21.53 | 2:39.91 |
| 19 | Ho Ping-jui (TPE) | 1:21.17 | 1:19.74 | 2:40.91 |
| 20 | Barakatullo Zokirov (TJK) | 1:22.11 | 1:23.84 | 2:45.95 |
| 21 | Tursunmurod Sokhibnazari (TJK) | 1:21.75 | 1:26.28 | 2:48.03 |
| 22 | Nizomiddin Sayfiddini (TJK) | 1:24.93 | 1:24.28 | 2:49.21 |
| 23 | Bakhriddin Goibov (TJK) | 1:23.99 | 1:26.44 | 2:50.43 |
| 24 | Othman Mirzan (MAS) | 1:25.66 | 1:25.34 | 2:51.00 |
| 25 | Vineet Sharma (IND) | 1:24.17 | 1:27.65 | 2:51.82 |
| 26 | Waqas Azam (PAK) | 1:25.23 | 1:28.20 | 2:53.43 |
| 27 | Wu Meng-che (TPE) | 1:26.66 | 1:29.76 | 2:56.42 |
| 28 | Zahid Abbas (PAK) | 1:31.89 | 1:32.07 | 3:03.96 |
| 29 | Ganbaataryn Buyant (MGL) | 1:34.90 | 1:42.45 | 3:17.35 |
| 30 | Suhail Azzam (JOR) | 1:48.01 | 1:52.34 | 3:40.35 |
| — | Zhang Yangming (CHN) | 1:11.34 | DNF | DNF |
| — | Muhammad Karim (PAK) | 1:15.29 | DNF | DNF |
| — | Himanshu Thakur (IND) | 1:17.35 | DNF | DNF |
| — | Robert Worachai Pinsent (THA) | 1:19.25 | DNF | DNF |
| — | Hayata Wakatsuki (JPN) | DNF | | DNF |
| — | Kyung Sung-hyun (KOR) | DNF | | DNF |
| — | Wang Yu (CHN) | DNF | | DNF |
| — | Mir Nawaz (PAK) | DNF | | DNF |
| — | Cyril Kayrouz (LBN) | DNF | | DNF |
| — | Arif Khan (IND) | DNF | | DNF |
| — | Saphal Ram Shrestha (NEP) | DNF | | DNF |
| — | Park Je-yun (KOR) | DSQ | | DSQ |
| — | Bayanmönkhiin Orkhontamir (MGL) | DSQ | | DSQ |
| — | Chagnaagiin Bayarzul (MGL) | DSQ | | DSQ |
