= Alpine skiing at the 2017 Asian Winter Games – Men's slalom =

Men's slalom at the 2017 Asian Winter Games
- Venue: Sapporo Teine
- Dates: 25 February 2017
- Competitors: 43 from 19 nations

Medalists
gold medal	Jung Dong-hyun	South Korea
silver medal	Kim Hyeon-tae	South Korea
bronze medal	Hideyuki Narita	Japan

The men's slalom at the 2017 Asian Winter Games was held on 25 February 2017 at the Sapporo Teine, Japan.

== Schedule ==
All times are Japan Standard Time (UTC+09:00)

Date	Time	Event
Saturday, 25 February 2017	10:15	1st run
Saturday, 25 February 2017	13:05	2nd run

== Results ==
Legend

- DNF — Did not finish
- DNS — Did not start
- DSQ — Disqualified

Rank	Athlete	1st run	2nd run	Total
1st place, gold medalist(s)	Jung Dong-hyun (KOR)	46.50	50.60	1:37.10
2nd place, silver medalist(s)	Kim Hyeon-tae (KOR)	47.66	51.52	1:39.18
3rd place, bronze medalist(s)	Hideyuki Narita (JPN)	47.47	51.91	1:39.38
4	Igor Zakurdayev (KAZ)	47.07	52.96	1:40.03
5	Hossein Saveh-Shemshaki (IRI)	48.23	52.69	1:40.92
6	Hayata Wakatsuki (JPN)	48.50	52.62	1:41.12
7	Mohammad Kiadarbandsari (IRI)	48.53	53.00	1:41.53
8	Park Je-yun (KOR)	49.63	52.26	1:41.89
9	Liam Michael (AUS)	50.62	54.17	1:44.79
10	Jeffrey Webb (MAS)	52.93	56.80	1:49.73
11	Yohan Goutt Gonçalves (TLS)	56.92	1:00.82	1:57.74
12	Cyril Kayrouz (LBN)	57.28	1:01.93	1:59.21
13	Mir Nawaz (PAK)	1:00.21	1:02.93	2:03.14
14	Raoul Al-Asmar (LBN)	59.55	1:03.63	2:03.18
15	Robert Worachai Pinsent (THA)	57.34	1:06.33	2:03.67
16	Ho Ping-jui (TPE)	1:00.57	1:04.90	2:05.47
17	Hira Lal (IND)	1:01.39	1:05.84	2:07.23
18	Barakatullo Zokirov (TJK)	1:03.39	1:08.56	2:11.95
19	Nizomiddin Sayfiddini (TJK)	1:04.33	1:08.87	2:13.20
20	Tursunmurod Sokhibnazari (TJK)	1:06.34	1:10.35	2:16.69
21	Waqas Azam (PAK)	1:07.85	1:11.84	2:19.69
22	Suhail Azzam (JOR)	1:17.44	1:21.77	2:39.21
—	Himanshu Thakur (IND)	59.81	DNF	DNF
—	Arif Khan (IND)	58.59	DNF	DNF
—	Wu Meng-che (TPE)	1:08.33	DNF	DNF
—	Saphal Ram Shrestha (NEP)	1:15.45	DNF	DNF
—	Zahid Abbas (PAK)	1:08.01	DNF	DNF
—	Nguyễn Văn An (VIE)	1:44.95	DNF	DNF
—	Chagnaagiin Bayarzul (MGL)	1:16.51	DNF	DNF
—	Mu Zecheng (CHN)	57.11	DSQ	DSQ
—	Kyung Sung-hyun (KOR)	DNF		DNF
—	Tatsuki Matsumoto (JPN)	DNF		DNF
—	Wang Yu (CHN)	DNF		DNF
—	Zhang Yangming (CHN)	DNF		DNF
—	Zhang Xiaosong (CHN)	DNF		DNF
—	Zakhar Kuchin (KAZ)	DNF		DNF
—	Muhammad Karim (PAK)	DNF		DNF
—	Evgeniy Timofeev (KGZ)	DNF		DNF
—	Vineet Sharma (IND)	DNF		DNF
—	Maxim Gordeev (KGZ)	DNF		DNF
—	Bakhriddin Goibov (TJK)	DSQ		DSQ
—	Nguyễn Võ Hữu Vinh (VIE)	DSQ		DSQ
—	Yohei Koyama (JPN)	DNS		DNS
