= Alpine skiing at the 2017 Asian Winter Games – Women's giant slalom =

Women's giant slalom at the 2017 Asian Winter Games
- Venue: Sapporo Teine
- Dates: 23 February 2017
- Competitors: 31 from 14 nations

Medalists
gold medal	Emi Hasegawa	Japan
silver medal	Asa Ando	Japan
bronze medal	Kang Young-seo	South Korea

The women's giant slalom at the 2017 Asian Winter Games was held on 23 February 2017 at the Sapporo Teine, Japan.

== Schedule ==
All times are Japan Standard Time (UTC+09:00)

Date	Time	Event
Thursday, 23 February 2017	10:00	1st run
Thursday, 23 February 2017	12:30	2nd run

== Results ==
Legend

- DNF — Did not finish
- DSQ — Disqualified

Rank	Athlete	1st run	2nd run	Total
1st place, gold medalist(s)	Emi Hasegawa (JPN)	1:11.31	1:10.27	2:21.58
2nd place, silver medalist(s)	Asa Ando (JPN)	1:13.04	1:10.41	2:23.45
3	Mio Arai (JPN)	1:14.77	1:10.72	2:25.49
3rd place, bronze medalist(s)	Kang Young-seo (KOR)	1:21.02	1:11.33	2:32.35
5	Zanna Farrell (AUS)	1:19.33	1:13.43	2:32.76
6	Yekaterina Karpova (KAZ)	1:18.28	1:15.24	2:33.52
7	Ni Yueming (CHN)	1:18.51	1:15.86	2:34.37
8	Noh Jin-soul (KOR)	1:17.74	1:16.98	2:34.72
9	Kong Fanying (CHN)	1:20.96	1:16.45	2:37.41
10	Wang Meixia (CHN)	1:20.89	1:17.24	2:38.13
11	Liu Yang (CHN)	1:21.91	1:18.57	2:40.48
12	Olga Paliutkina (KGZ)	1:23.63	1:18.12	2:41.75
13	Sadaf Saveh-Shemshaki (IRI)	1:23.91	1:19.07	2:42.98
14	Forough Abbasi (IRI)	1:26.18	1:20.94	2:47.12
15	Carlie Iskandar (LBN)	1:29.08	1:24.61	2:53.69
16	Aanchal Thakur (IND)	1:29.05	1:27.29	2:56.34
17	Sofia Fayad (LBN)	1:31.32	1:26.28	2:57.60
18	Sandhya Thakur (IND)	1:41.65	1:32.72	3:14.37
19	Varsha Devi (IND)	1:40.51	1:37.06	3:17.57
20	Darikha Muratalieva (KGZ)	1:49.22	1:41.25	3:30.47
21	Ifrah Wali (PAK)	1:52.99	1:49.40	3:42.39
22	Sara Sukhtian (JOR)	2:02.25	1:57.16	3:59.41
23	Fatima Sohail (PAK)	2:01.96	1:59.90	4:01.86
24	Zainab Sohail (PAK)	2:09.15	2:02.53	4:11.68
25	Jargalsürengiin Tögszayaa (MGL)	2:18.35	2:17.64	4:35.99
—	Gim So-hui (KOR)	1:14.17	DNF	DNF
—	Sangita Lama (NEP)	2:11.91	DNF	DNF
—	Gayatri Devi (IND)	2:11.64	DNF	DNF
—	Huang Pei-chen (TPE)	1:40.10	DSQ	DSQ
—	Rim Seung-hyun (KOR)	DNF		DNF
—	Umama Wali (PAK)	DNF		DNF

- Kang Young-seo was awarded bronze because of no three-medal sweep per country rule.
