= Cross-country skiing at the 2017 Asian Winter Games – Men's 30 kilometre freestyle =

Men's 30 kilometre freestyle at the 2017 Asian Winter Games
- Venue: Shirahatayama Open Stadium
- Dates: 26 February 2017
- Competitors: 21 from 7 nations

Medalists
| gold medal | Akira Lenting | Japan |
| silver medal | Sergey Cherepanov | Kazakhstan |
| bronze medal | Nikolay Chebotko | Kazakhstan |

The men's 30 kilometre mass start freestyle at the 2017 Asian Winter Games was held on 26 February 2017 at the Shirahatayama Open Stadium in Sapporo, Japan.

== Schedule ==
All times are Japan Standard Time (UTC+09:00)

| Date | Time | Event |
|---|---|---|
| Sunday, 26 February 2017 | 12:30 | Final |

== Results ==
Legend

- DNF — Did not finish
- DNS — Did not start

| Rank | Athlete | Time |
|---|---|---|
| 1st place, gold medalist(s) | Akira Lenting (JPN) | 1:22:54.0 |
| 2nd place, silver medalist(s) | Sergey Cherepanov (KAZ) | 1:22:54.0 |
| 3rd place, bronze medalist(s) | Nikolay Chebotko (KAZ) | 1:22:56.3 |
| 4 | Yerdos Akhmadiyev (KAZ) | 1:22:59.4 |
| 5 | Naoto Baba (JPN) | 1:23:03.3 |
| 6 | Wang Qiang (CHN) | 1:23:07.8 |
| 7 | Magnus Kim (KOR) | 1:24:18.6 |
| 8 | Kim Eun-ho (KOR) | 1:24:35.5 |
| 9 | Kohei Shimizu (JPN) | 1:27:06.1 |
| 10 | Park Seong-beom (KOR) | 1:27:26.8 |
| 11 | Shang Jincai (CHN) | 1:29:28.7 |
| 12 | Hwang Jun-ho (KOR) | 1:29:28.7 |
| 13 | Wang Runzhe (CHN) | 1:31:55.2 |
| 14 | Batmönkhiin Achbadrakh (MGL) | 1:34:28.9 |
| 15 | Ben Sim (AUS) | 1:35:06.4 |
| 16 | Jagdish Singh (IND) | 1:36:43.5 |
| 17 | Mohamed Iliyas (IND) | 1:41:08.7 |
| 18 | Jackson Bursill (AUS) | 1:48:13.7 |
| — | Wei Meng (CHN) | DNF |
| — | Baasansürengiin Amarsanaa (MGL) | DNF |
| — | Sergey Malyshev (KAZ) | DNS |
