= Cross-country skiing at the 2017 Asian Winter Games – Men's 15 kilometre freestyle =

Men's 15 kilometre freestyle at the 2017 Asian Winter Games
- Venue: Shirahatayama Open Stadium
- Dates: 21 February 2017
- Competitors: 26 from 9 nations

Medalists
gold medal	Rinat Mukhin	Kazakhstan
silver medal	Naoto Baba	Japan
bronze medal	Akira Lenting	Japan

The men's 15 kilometre freestyle at the 2017 Asian Winter Games was held on 21 February 2017 at the Shirahatayama Open Stadium in Sapporo, Japan.

== Schedule ==
All times are Japan Standard Time (UTC+09:00)

Date	Time	Event
Tuesday, 21 February 2017	11:00	Final

== Results ==
Legend

- DNS — Did not start
- DSQ — Disqualified

Rank	Athlete	Time
1st place, gold medalist(s)	Rinat Mukhin (KAZ)	41:25.3
2nd place, silver medalist(s)	Naoto Baba (JPN)	41:29.8
3rd place, bronze medalist(s)	Akira Lenting (JPN)	41:33.3
4	Sergey Cherepanov (KAZ)	41:49.1
5	Nikolay Chebotko (KAZ)	42:50.4
6	Yerdos Akhmadiyev (KAZ)	43:10.5
7	Wang Qiang (CHN)	43:33.8
8	Magnus Kim (KOR)	43:35.5
9	Nobuhito Kashiwabara (JPN)	44:06.7
10	Kim Min-woo (KOR)	44:24.5
11	Kim Eun-ho (KOR)	45:03.8
12	Shang Jincai (CHN)	45:17.1
13	Ben Sim (AUS)	48:12.2
14	Zhu Mingliang (CHN)	48:29.3
15	Wei Meng (CHN)	48:58.7
16	Jackson Bursill (AUS)	50:17.6
17	Jagdish Singh (IND)	50:22.0
18	Mohamed Iliyas (IND)	51:24.2
19	Ishaq Khan (PAK)	57:24.7
20	Imran Khan (PAK)	58:26.1
21	Zubair (PAK)	59:25.1
22	Samer Tawk (LBN)	1:00:58.6
23	Sajeev De Silva (SRI)	1:34:55.6
24	Shehan Muthugala (SRI)	1:42:48.9
—	Fazal Haq (PAK)	DSQ
—	Hwang Jun-ho (KOR)	DNS
