= Snowboarding at the 2017 Asian Winter Games =

- Venue: Sapporo Teine; Bankei Ski Area
- Dates: 19–25 February 2017
- Competitors: 58 from 11 nations

Snowboarding at the 2017 Asian Winter Games was held in Sapporo, Japan, between 19 and 25 February at Sapporo Teine (slalom events) and Sapporo Bankei Ski Area (halfpipe). Snowboarding returns to the games program after missing the last edition in 2011 in Kazakhstan. A total of six events were contested, three each for men and women.

== Schedule ==
Q	Qualification	F	Final

Event↓/Date →	19th Sun	20th Mon	21st Tue	22nd Wed	23rd Thu	24th Fri	25th Sat	
Men's halfpipe							Q	F
Men's slalom		F						
Men's giant slalom	F							
Women's halfpipe							Q	F
Women's slalom		F						
Women's giant slalom	F							

== Medalists ==
=== Men ===
Event	Gold	Silver	Bronze
Halfpipe	Zhang Yiwei; China	Kweon Lee-jun; South Korea	Ayumu Nedefuji; Japan
Slalom	Lee Sang-ho; South Korea	Yuya Suzuki; Japan	Kim Sang-kyum; South Korea
Giant slalom	Lee Sang-ho; South Korea	Choi Bo-gun; South Korea	Shinnosuke Kamino; Japan

=== Women ===
Event	Gold	Silver	Bronze
Halfpipe	Liu Jiayu; China	Cai Xuetong; China	Kurumi Imai; Japan
Slalom	Zang Ruxin; China	Eri Yanetani; Japan	Shin Da-hae; South Korea
Giant slalom	Eri Yanetani; Japan	Zang Ruxin; China	Gong Naiying; China

== Medal table ==
Rank	Nation	Gold	Silver	Bronze	Total
1	China (CHN)	3	2	1	6
2	South Korea (KOR)	2	2	2	6
3	Japan (JPN)	1	2	3	6
Totals (3 entries)		6	6	6	18

== Participating nations ==
A total of 58 athletes from 11 nations competed in snowboarding at the 2017 Asian Winter Games:

- Australia (4)
- China (15)
- India (1)
- Iran (6)
- Japan (10)
- Kazakhstan (4)
- Lebanon (2)
- Philippines (1)
- South Korea (12)
- Sri Lanka (1)
- Vietnam (2)

* Australia as guest nation, was ineligible to win any medals.
