= Cross-country skiing at the 2017 Asian Winter Games – Men's sprint classical =

Men's sprint classical at the 2017 Asian Winter Games
- Venue: Shirahatayama Open Stadium
- Dates: 20 February 2017
- Competitors: 19 from 7 nations

Medalists
| gold medal | Magnus Kim | South Korea |
| silver medal | Sun Qinghai | China |
| bronze medal | Nobuhito Kashiwabara | Japan |

The men's sprint classical at the 2017 Asian Winter Games was held on 20 February 2017 at the Shirahatayama Open Stadium in Sapporo, Japan.

== Schedule ==
All times are Japan Standard Time (UTC+09:00)

| Date | Time | Event |
|---|---|---|
| Monday, 20 February 2017 | 09:50 | Qualification |
| Monday, 20 February 2017 | 11:20 | Quarterfinals |
| Monday, 20 February 2017 | 11:50 | Semifinals |
| Monday, 20 February 2017 | 12:15 | Finals |

== Results ==
Legend

- DNS — Did not start

=== Qualification ===
| Rank | Athlete | Time |
|---|---|---|
| 1 | Magnus Kim (KOR) | 3:17.29 |
| 2 | Nobuhito Kashiwabara (JPN) | 3:19.66 |
| 3 | Sun Qinghai (CHN) | 3:22.10 |
| 4 | Shang Jincai (CHN) | 3:22.19 |
| 5 | Sergey Malyshev (KAZ) | 3:22.25 |
| 6 | Wang Qiang (CHN) | 3:23.33 |
| 7 | Nikolay Chebotko (KAZ) | 3:24.39 |
| 8 | Kohei Shimizu (JPN) | 3:24.43 |
| 9 | Hwang Jun-ho (KOR) | 3:25.58 |
| 10 | Sergey Cherepanov (KAZ) | 3:26.49 |
| 11 | Zhu Mingliang (CHN) | 3:26.91 |
| 12 | Park Seong-beom (KOR) | 3:27.45 |
| 13 | Alexandr Malyshev (KAZ) | 3:28.52 |
| 14 | Kim Eun-ho (KOR) | 3:29.28 |
| 15 | Naoto Baba (JPN) | 3:37.76 |
| 16 | Tariel Zharkymbaev (KGZ) | 3:40.41 |
| 17 | Jackson Bursill (AUS) | 3:51.77 |
| 18 | Lukas Hettiaratchi (SRI) | 4:44.88 |
| — | Ben Sim (AUS) | DNS |

=== Quarterfinals ===
==== Heat 1 ====
| Rank | Athlete | Time |
|---|---|---|
| 1 | Magnus Kim (KOR) | 3:18.87 |
| 2 | Hwang Jun-ho (KOR) | 3:19.92 |
| 3 | Kohei Shimizu (JPN) | 3:19.92 |
| 4 | Tariel Zharkymbaev (KGZ) | 3:42.53 |

==== Heat 2 ====
| Rank | Athlete | Time |
|---|---|---|
| 1 | Sergey Malyshev (KAZ) | 3:17.28 |
| 2 | Shang Jincai (CHN) | 3:18.16 |
| 3 | Park Seong-beom (KOR) | 3:22.43 |
| 4 | Alexandr Malyshev (KAZ) | 3:23.61 |

==== Heat 3 ====
| Rank | Athlete | Time |
|---|---|---|
| 1 | Nikolay Chebotko (KAZ) | 3:17.01 |
| 2 | Nobuhito Kashiwabara (JPN) | 3:18.97 |
| 3 | Sergey Cherepanov (KAZ) | 3:18.97 |
| 4 | Naoto Baba (JPN) | 3:40.31 |

==== Heat 4 ====
| Rank | Athlete | Time |
|---|---|---|
| 1 | Sun Qinghai (CHN) | 3:21.04 |
| 2 | Wang Qiang (CHN) | 3:21.64 |
| 3 | Zhu Mingliang (CHN) | 3:25.05 |
| 4 | Kim Eun-ho (KOR) | 3:26.48 |

=== Semifinals ===
==== Heat 1 ====
| Rank | Athlete | Time |
|---|---|---|
| 1 | Magnus Kim (KOR) | 3:17.58 |
| 2 | Shang Jincai (CHN) | 3:18.03 |
| 3 | Sergey Malyshev (KAZ) | 3:18.03 |
| 4 | Hwang Jun-ho (KOR) | 3:21.97 |

==== Heat 2 ====
| Rank | Athlete | Time |
|---|---|---|
| 1 | Sun Qinghai (CHN) | 3:18.37 |
| 2 | Nobuhito Kashiwabara (JPN) | 3:19.83 |
| 3 | Nikolay Chebotko (KAZ) | 3:20.28 |
| 4 | Wang Qiang (CHN) | 4:03.09 |

=== Finals ===
==== Final B ====
| Rank | Athlete | Time |
|---|---|---|
| 1 | Wang Qiang (CHN) | 3:21.41 |
| 2 | Sergey Malyshev (KAZ) | 3:22.71 |
| 3 | Hwang Jun-ho (KOR) | 3:26.69 |
| 4 | Nikolay Chebotko (KAZ) | 3:40.24 |

==== Final A ====
| Rank | Athlete | Time |
|---|---|---|
| 1st place, gold medalist(s) | Magnus Kim (KOR) | 3:11.40 |
| 2nd place, silver medalist(s) | Sun Qinghai (CHN) | 3:11.40 |
| 3rd place, bronze medalist(s) | Nobuhito Kashiwabara (JPN) | 3:17.35 |
| 4 | Shang Jincai (CHN) | 3:38.87 |
