= Cross-country skiing at the 2017 Asian Winter Games – Men's 10 kilometre classical =

Men's 10 kilometre classical at the 2017 Asian Winter Games
- Venue: Shirahatayama Open Stadium
- Dates: 23 February 2017
- Competitors: 22 from 9 nations

Medalists
gold medal	Akira Lenting	Japan
silver medal	Magnus Kim	South Korea
bronze medal	Kohei Shimizu	Japan

The men's 10 kilometre classical at the 2017 Asian Winter Games was held on 20 February 2017 at the Shirahatayama Open Stadium in Sapporo, Japan.

== Schedule ==
All times are Japan Standard Time (UTC+09:00)

Date	Time	Event
Thursday, 23 February 2017	11:00	Final

== Results ==
Rank	Athlete	Time
1st place, gold medalist(s)	Akira Lenting (JPN)	25:15.6
2nd place, silver medalist(s)	Magnus Kim (KOR)	25:32.5
3rd place, bronze medalist(s)	Kohei Shimizu (JPN)	25:39.0
4	Sergey Cherepanov (KAZ)	25:51.1
5	Nikolay Chebotko (KAZ)	26:08.2
6	Yerdos Akhmadiyev (KAZ)	26:16.6
7	Naoto Baba (JPN)	26:27.5
8	Sergey Malyshev (KAZ)	26:32.3
9	Wang Qiang (CHN)	27:21.3
10	Park Seong-beom (KOR)	27:43.8
11	Hwang Jun-ho (KOR)	27:58.8
12	Shang Jincai (CHN)	28:06.6
13	Zhu Mingliang (CHN)	28:18.7
14	Kim Min-woo (KOR)	29:17.1
15	Ben Sim (AUS)	29:38.0
16	Wang Runzhe (CHN)	30:47.8
17	Jackson Bursill (AUS)	32:47.4
18	Mohamed Iliyas (IND)	36:13.8
19	Jagdish Singh (IND)	36:48.4
20	Samer Tawk (LBN)	41:15.2
21	Lukas Hettiaratchi (SRI)	48:51.0
22	Nguyễn Đức Mạnh (VIE)	1:04:30.0
