= Alpine skiing at the 2017 Asian Winter Games – Women's slalom =

Women's slalom at the 2017 Asian Winter Games
- Venue: Sapporo Teine
- Dates: 25 February 2017
- Competitors: 30 from 12 nations

Medalists
gold medal	Emi Hasegawa	Japan
silver medal	Asa Ando	Japan
bronze medal	Kang Young-seo	South Korea

The women's slalom at the 2017 Asian Winter Games was held on 25 February 2017 at the Sapporo Teine, Japan.

== Schedule ==
All times are Japan Standard Time (UTC+09:00)

Date	Time	Event
Saturday, 25 February 2017	09:30	1st run
Saturday, 25 February 2017	12:20	2nd run

== Results ==
Legend

- DNF — Did not finish

Rank	Athlete	1st run	2nd run	Total
1st place, gold medalist(s)	Emi Hasegawa (JPN)	49.23	52.97	1:42.20
2nd place, silver medalist(s)	Asa Ando (JPN)	49.23	53.61	1:42.84
3rd place, bronze medalist(s)	Kang Young-seo (KOR)	50.66	55.04	1:45.70
4	Mio Arai (JPN)	50.51	55.31	1:45.82
5	Noh Jin-soul (KOR)	52.36	57.70	1:50.06
6	Rim Seung-hyun (KOR)	53.61	58.08	1:51.69
7	Kong Fanying (CHN)	53.31	58.72	1:52.03
8	Zanna Farrell (AUS)	54.08	59.19	1:53.27
9	Ni Yueming (CHN)	53.79	1:00.87	1:54.66
10	Mariya Grigorova (KAZ)	55.32	59.89	1:55.21
11	Yekaterina Karpova (KAZ)	55.58	1:01.28	1:56.86
12	Forough Abbasi (IRI)	56.60	1:00.60	1:57.20
13	Sadaf Saveh-Shemshaki (IRI)	58.34	1:01.98	2:00.32
14	Zhu Tianhui (CHN)	58.60	1:02.96	2:01.56
15	Carlie Iskandar (LBN)	1:01.69	1:05.71	2:07.40
16	Olga Paliutkina (KGZ)	1:02.36	1:06.14	2:08.50
17	Sofia Fayad (LBN)	1:03.11	1:07.13	2:10.24
18	Huang Pei-chen (TPE)	1:09.24	1:23.09	2:32.33
19	Darikha Muratalieva (KGZ)	1:20.29	1:27.49	2:47.78
20	Sandhya Thakur (IND)	1:18.59	1:33.39	2:51.98
21	Ifrah Wali (PAK)	1:22.35	1:31.24	2:53.59
22	Preeti Dimri (IND)	1:22.89	1:35.92	2:58.81
23	Fatima Sohail (PAK)	1:35.53	1:49.85	3:25.38
24	Sangita Lama (NEP)	1:49.09	2:37.97	4:27.06
—	Choe Jeong-hyeon (KOR)	53.77	DNF	DNF
—	Wang Meixia (CHN)	57.54	DNF	DNF
—	Aanchal Thakur (IND)	1:06.63	DNF	DNF
—	Varsha Devi (IND)	1:11.77	DNF	DNF
—	Umama Wali (PAK)	1:38.61	DNF	DNF
—	Zainab Sohail (PAK)	DNF		DNF
