= Cross-country skiing at the 2017 Asian Winter Games – Women's 5 kilometre classical =

Women's 5 kilometre classical at the 2017 Asian Winter Games
- Venue: Shirahatayama Open Stadium
- Dates: 23 February 2017
- Competitors: 23 from 9 nations

Medalists
gold medal	Yuki Kobayashi	Japan
silver medal	Yelena Kolomina	Kazakhstan
bronze medal	Li Hongxue	China

The women's 5 kilometre classical at the 2017 Asian Winter Games was held on 23 February 2017 at the Shirahatayama Open Stadium in Sapporo, Japan.

== Schedule ==
All times are Japan Standard Time (UTC+09:00)

Date	Time	Event
Thursday, 23 February 2017	10:00	Final

== Results ==
Legend

- DNF — Did not finish
- DNS — Did not start

Rank	Athlete	Time
1st place, gold medalist(s)	Yuki Kobayashi (JPN)	14:56.1
2nd place, silver medalist(s)	Yelena Kolomina (KAZ)	15:02.8
3rd place, bronze medalist(s)	Li Hongxue (CHN)	15:18.6
4	Chi Chunxue (CHN)	15:22.9
5	Kozue Takizawa (JPN)	15:24.8
6	Chisa Obayashi (JPN)	15:32.9
7	Li Xin (CHN)	15:34.2
8	Angelina Shuryga (KAZ)	15:43.6
9	Karen Chanloung (THA)	15:46.0
10	Anzhelika Tarassova (KAZ)	15:53.1
11	Casey Wright (AUS)	15:57.4
12	Darya Ryazhko (KAZ)	15:58.5
13	Man Dandan (CHN)	16:00.0
14	Han Da-som (KOR)	16:10.1
15	Je Sang-mi (KOR)	16:25.2
16	Choe Shin-ae (KOR)	17:05.7
17	Bat-Ochiryn Delgermaa (MGL)	20:03.6
18	Lea Rahme (LBN)	31:51.5
19	Nisha Devi (IND)	36:03.6
20	Vikas Rana (IND)	37:49.1
—	Sarla Thakur (IND)	DNF
—	Hikari Miyazaki (JPN)	DNS
—	Ju Hye-ri (KOR)	DNS
