= Cross-country skiing at the 2017 Asian Winter Games – Women's 10 kilometre freestyle =

Women's 10 kilometre freestyle at the 2017 Asian Winter Games
- Venue: Shirahatayama Open Stadium
- Dates: 21 February 2017
- Competitors: 24 from 10 nations

Medalists
gold medal	Yuki Kobayashi	Japan
silver medal	Lee Chae-won	South Korea
bronze medal	Yelena Kolomina	Kazakhstan

The women's 10 kilometre freestyle at the 2017 Asian Winter Games was held on 21 February 2017 at the Shirahatayama Open Stadium in Sapporo, Japan.

== Schedule ==
All times are Japan Standard Time (UTC+09:00)

Date	Time	Event
Tuesday, 21 February 2017	10:00	Final

== Results ==
Legend

- DNF — Did not finish

Rank	Athlete	Time
1st place, gold medalist(s)	Yuki Kobayashi (JPN)	30:24.6
2nd place, silver medalist(s)	Lee Chae-won (KOR)	30:49.0
3rd place, bronze medalist(s)	Yelena Kolomina (KAZ)	31:14.4
4	Kozue Takizawa (JPN)	31:25.2
5	Chisa Obayashi (JPN)	31:35.4
6	Li Hongxue (CHN)	32:10.9
7	Marina Matrossova (KAZ)	32:19.7
8	Anzhelika Tarassova (KAZ)	32:31.5
9	Chi Chunxue (CHN)	32:53.9
10	Hikari Miyazaki (JPN)	33:17.8
11	Darya Ryazhko (KAZ)	33:20.0
12	Han Da-som (KOR)	33:35.7
13	Karen Chanloung (THA)	33:46.5
14	Ma Qinghua (CHN)	33:59.8
15	Casey Wright (AUS)	34:07.7
16	Choe Shin-ae (KOR)	34:35.4
17	Ju Hye-ri (KOR)	35:57.6
18	Bat-Ochiryn Delgermaa (MGL)	43:06.4
19	Manikala Rai (NEP)	43:35.1
20	Nisha Devi (IND)	1:06:30.2
21	Vikas Rana (IND)	1:15:20.8
22	Lea Rahme (LBN)	1:15:38.3
23	Sarla Thakur (IND)	1:19:22.2
—	Li Xin (CHN)	DNF
