= Cross-country skiing at the 2017 Asian Winter Games – Women's 15 kilometre freestyle =

Women's 15 kilometre freestyle at the 2017 Asian Winter Games
- Venue: Shirahatayama Open Stadium
- Dates: 26 February 2017
- Competitors: 24 from 8 nations

Medalists
gold medal	Yuki Kobayashi	Japan
silver medal	Lee Chae-won	South Korea
bronze medal	Li Hongxue	China

The women's 15 kilometre mass start freestyle at the 2017 Asian Winter Games was held on 26 February 2017 at the Shirahatayama Open Stadium in Sapporo, Japan.

== Schedule ==
All times are Japan Standard Time (UTC+09:00)

Date	Time	Event
Sunday, 26 February 2017	10:00	Final

== Results ==
Legend

- DNS — Did not start

Rank	Athlete	Time
1st place, gold medalist(s)	Yuki Kobayashi (JPN)	43:28.6
2nd place, silver medalist(s)	Lee Chae-won (KOR)	43:32.5
3rd place, bronze medalist(s)	Li Hongxue (CHN)	43:33.8
4	Kozue Takizawa (JPN)	43:38.5
5	Chisa Obayashi (JPN)	43:44.1
6	Yelena Kolomina (KAZ)	44:18.2
7	Angelina Shuryga (KAZ)	44:40.2
8	Chi Chunxue (CHN)	45:17.7
9	Tamara Ebel (KAZ)	45:37.7
10	Ma Qinghua (CHN)	45:45.4
11	Karen Chanloung (THA)	46:17.7
12	Darya Ryazhko (KAZ)	46:38.2
13	Hikari Miyazaki (JPN)	47:11.8
14	Ju Hye-ri (KOR)	47:17.0
15	Han Da-som (KOR)	48:09.6
16	Choe Shin-ae (KOR)	48:12.6
17	Ariunsanaagiin Enkhtuul (MGL)	50:35.0
18	Chinbatyn Otgontsetseg (MGL)	51:35.8
19	Bat-Ochiryn Delgermaa (MGL)	53:33.1
20	Manikala Rai (NEP)	59:10.9
—	Li Xin (CHN)	DNS
—	Nisha Devi (IND)	DNS
—	Sarla Thakur (IND)	DNS
—	Vikas Rana (IND)	DNS
