= Freestyle skiing at the 2017 Asian Winter Games =

- Venue: Bankei Ski Area
- Dates: 24–26 February 2017
- Competitors: 31 from 7 nations

Freestyle skiing at the 2017 Asian Winter Games was held in Sapporo, Japan between 24–26 February at the Sapporo Bankei Ski Area. A total of four events were contested: men's and women's dual moguls and moguls.

== Schedule ==
Q	Qualification	F	Final

Event↓/Date →	24th Fri		25th Sat	26th Sun	
Men's moguls				Q	F
Men's dual moguls	Q	F			
Women's moguls				Q	F
Women's dual moguls	Q	F			

== Medalists ==
=== Men ===
Event	Gold	Silver	Bronze
Moguls	Ikuma Horishima; Japan	Choi Jae-woo; South Korea	Dmitriy Reiherd; Kazakhstan
Dual moguls	Ikuma Horishima; Japan	Daichi Hara; Japan	Dmitriy Reiherd; Kazakhstan

=== Women ===
Event	Gold	Silver	Bronze
Moguls	Arisa Murata; Japan	Yuliya Galysheva; Kazakhstan	Miki Ito; Japan
Dual moguls	Yuliya Galysheva; Kazakhstan	Arisa Murata; Japan	Miki Ito; Japan

== Medal table ==
Rank	Nation	Gold	Silver	Bronze	Total
1	Japan (JPN)	3	2	2	7
2	Kazakhstan (KAZ)	1	1	2	4
3	South Korea (KOR)	0	1	0	1
Totals (3 entries)		4	4	4	12

== Participating nations ==
A total of 31 athletes from 7 nations competed in freestyle skiing at the 2017 Asian Winter Games:

- Australia (4)
- China (7)
- Japan (8)
- Kazakhstan (4)
- Mongolia (2)
- South Korea (5)
- Thailand (1)

* Australia as guest nation, was ineligible to win any medals.
