= Cross-country skiing at the 2017 Asian Winter Games – Women's 4 × 5 kilometre relay =

Women's 4 × 5 kilometre relay at the 2017 Asian Winter Games
- Venue: Shirahatayama Open Stadium
- Dates: 24 February 2017
- Competitors: 16 from 4 nations

Medalists
gold medal	Japan; Hikari Miyazaki, Kozue Takizawa, Yuki Kobayashi, Chisa Obayashi
silver medal	China; Man Dandan, Li Xin, Chi Chunxue, Li Hongxue
bronze medal	South Korea; Je Sang-mi, Han Da-som, Ju Hye-ri, Lee Chae-won

The women's 4 × 5 kilometre relay at the 2017 Asian Winter Games was held on 24 February 2017 at the Shirahatayama Open Stadium in Sapporo, Japan.

== Schedule ==
All times are Japan Standard Time (UTC+09:00)

Date	Time	Event
Friday, 24 February 2017	10:00	Final

== Results ==
Rank	Team	Time
1st place, gold medalist(s)	Japan (JPN)	1:08:16.6
	Hikari Miyazaki	18:07.1
	Kozue Takizawa	17:36.8
	Yuki Kobayashi	15:51.6
	Chisa Obayashi	16:41.1
2nd place, silver medalist(s)	China (CHN)	1:08:41.4
	Man Dandan	17:52.6
	Li Xin	17:51.4
	Chi Chunxue	16:36.3
	Li Hongxue	16:21.1
3rd place, bronze medalist(s)	South Korea (KOR)	1:09:13.3
	Je Sang-mi	18:33.3
	Han Da-som	17:38.7
	Ju Hye-ri	17:13.1
	Lee Chae-won	15:48.2
4	Kazakhstan (KAZ)	1:09:37.3
	Angelina Shuryga	18:01.3
	Anzhelika Tarassova	17:33.7
	Marina Matrossova	17:10.3
	Yelena Kolomina	16:52.0
