= Freestyle skiing at the 2017 Asian Winter Games – Women's dual moguls =

Women's dual moguls at the 2017 Asian Winter Games
- Venue: Bankei Ski Area
- Dates: 24 February 2017
- Competitors: 12 from 5 nations

Medalists
gold medal	Yuliya Galysheva	Kazakhstan
silver medal	Arisa Murata	Japan
bronze medal	Miki Ito	Japan

The women's dual moguls at the 2017 Asian Winter Games was held on 24 February 2017 at Bankei Ski Area in Sapporo, Japan.

== Schedule ==
All times are Japan Standard Time (UTC+09:00)

Date	Time	Event
Friday, 24 February 2017	10:40	Qualification
Friday, 24 February 2017	12:00	Finals

== Results ==
=== Qualification ===
Rank	Athlete	Score
1	Yuliya Galysheva (KAZ)	70.96
2	Arisa Murata (JPN)	69.84
3	Miki Ito (JPN)	68.64
4	Kisara Sumiyoshi (JPN)	68.32
5	Jakara Anthony (AUS)	67.11
6	Sophie Ash (AUS)	64.65
7	Seo Jung-hwa (KOR)	63.65
8	Hinako Tomitaka (JPN)	62.13
9	Seo Jee-won (KOR)	61.72
10	Gao Dongxue (CHN)	35.30
11	Ma Zhuoni (CHN)	33.61
12	Shao Huijun (CHN)	1.44

=== Knockout round ===
Quarterfinals
1	Yuliya Galysheva (KAZ)	23
8	Hinako Tomitaka (JPN)	2
5	Jakara Anthony (AUS)	5
4	Kisara Sumiyoshi (JPN)	20
3	Miki Ito (JPN)	23
6	Sophie Ash (AUS)	2
7	Seo Jung-hwa (KOR)	3
2	Arisa Murata (JPN)	22

Semifinals
1	Yuliya Galysheva (KAZ)	16
4	Kisara Sumiyoshi (JPN)	9
3	Miki Ito (JPN)	8
2	Arisa Murata (JPN)	17

Final
1	Yuliya Galysheva (KAZ)	15
2	Arisa Murata (JPN)	10
Small final
4	Kisara Sumiyoshi (JPN)	11
3	Miki Ito (JPN)	14
