= Snowboarding at the 2017 Asian Winter Games – Men's slalom =

Men's slalom at the 2017 Asian Winter Games
- Venue: Sapporo Teine
- Dates: 20 February 2017
- Competitors: 24 from 10 nations

Medalists
gold medal	Lee Sang-ho	South Korea
silver medal	Yuya Suzuki	Japan
bronze medal	Kim Sang-kyum	South Korea

The men's snowboard slalom competition at the 2017 Asian Winter Games in Sapporo, Japan was held on 20 February at the Sapporo Teine.

== Schedule ==
All times are Japan Standard Time (UTC+09:00)

Date	Time	Event
Monday, 20 February 2017	10:20	1st run
Monday, 20 February 2017	12:35	2nd run

== Results ==
Legend

- DNF — Did not finish
- DSQ — Disqualified

Rank	Athlete	1st run	2nd run	Total
1st place, gold medalist(s)	Lee Sang-ho (KOR)	39.80	36.29	1:16.09
2nd place, silver medalist(s)	Yuya Suzuki (JPN)	40.70	36.10	1:16.80
3rd place, bronze medalist(s)	Kim Sang-kyum (KOR)	41.67	35.75	1:17.42
4	Choi Bo-gun (KOR)	41.27	36.70	1:17.97
5	Zhang Xuan (CHN)	42.39	36.14	1:18.53
6	Bi Ye (CHN)	40.48	39.08	1:19.56
7	Ji Myung-kon (KOR)	43.39	36.63	1:20.02
8	Sun Huan (CHN)	43.84	36.80	1:20.64
9	Christian De Oliveira (AUS)	44.06	37.09	1:21.15
10	Wu Pengtao (CHN)	43.65	38.42	1:22.07
11	Ryan Espiritu (PHI)	44.65	37.95	1:22.60
12	Hossein Kalhor (IRI)	45.48	38.56	1:24.04
13	Vladislav Zuyev (KAZ)	48.93	40.32	1:29.25
14	Rollan Sadykov (KAZ)	49.12	41.58	1:30.70
15	Nicholas Masjuk (AUS)	51.80	42.66	1:34.46
16	Nafez Tauk (LBN)	1:02.00	51.46	1:53.46
17	Avtar Singh (IND)	1:04.71	52.84	1:57.55
18	Trịnh Đình Thời (VIE)	2:33.57	2:24.75	4:58.32
—	Hossein Seid (IRI)	48.58	DNF	DNF
—	Shinnosuke Kamino (JPN)	41.67	DSQ	DSQ
—	Takumi Miyazawa (JPN)	43.10	DSQ	DSQ
—	Hassan Kalhor (IRI)	47.47	DSQ	DSQ
—	Hossein Kalhor (IRI)	DNF		DNF
—	Nguyễn Thái Bình (VIE)	DNF		DNF
