= Snowboarding at the 2017 Asian Winter Games – Women's giant slalom =

Women's giant slalom at the 2017 Asian Winter Games
- Venue: Sapporo Teine
- Dates: 19 February 2017
- Competitors: 15 from 8 nations

Medalists
gold medal	Eri Yanetani	Japan
silver medal	Zang Ruxin	China
bronze medal	Gong Naiying	China

The women's snowboard giant slalom competition at the 2017 Asian Winter Games in Sapporo, Japan was held on 19 February at the Sapporo Teine.

== Schedule ==
All times are Japan Standard Time (UTC+09:00)

Date	Time	Event
Sunday, 19 February 2017	10:00	1st run
Sunday, 19 February 2017	12:15	2nd run

== Results ==
Legend

- DSQ — Disqualified

Rank	Athlete	1st run	2nd run	Total
1st place, gold medalist(s)	Eri Yanetani (JPN)	55.67	47.80	1:43.47
2nd place, silver medalist(s)	Zang Ruxin (CHN)	55.95	49.75	1:45.70
3rd place, bronze medalist(s)	Gong Naiying (CHN)	56.39	49.42	1:45.81
4	Jeong Hae-rim (KOR)	59.67	48.46	1:48.13
5	Shin Da-hae (KOR)	59.06	49.60	1:48.66
6	Xu Xiaoxiao (CHN)	1:03.57	49.31	1:52.88
7	Millie Bongiorno (AUS)	1:01.55	53.58	1:55.13
8	Asa Toyoda (JPN)	1:09.78	51.86	2:01.64
9	Xeniya Tupik (KAZ)	1:07.06	55.56	2:02.62
10	Dariya Slobodkina (KAZ)	1:05.86	57.66	2:03.52
11	Shima Yarkhah (IRI)	1:06.25	57.69	2:03.94
12	Setareh Yazdani (IRI)	1:05.15	1:02.19	2:07.34
13	Uguette Fakhry (LBN)	1:26.33	1:19.27	2:45.60
—	Niu Jiaqi (CHN)	DSQ		DSQ
—	Azquiya Usuph (SRI)	DSQ		DSQ
