= Freestyle skiing at the 2017 Asian Winter Games – Women's moguls =

Women's moguls at the 2017 Asian Winter Games
- Venue: Bankei Ski Area
- Dates: 26 February 2017
- Competitors: 12 from 5 nations

Medalists
gold medal	Arisa Murata	Japan
silver medal	Yuliya Galysheva	Kazakhstan
bronze medal	Miki Ito	Japan

The women's moguls at the 2017 Asian Winter Games was held on 26 February 2017 at Bankei Ski Area in Sapporo, Japan.

== Schedule ==
All times are Japan Standard Time (UTC+09:00)

Date	Time	Event
Sunday, 26 February 2017	09:55	Qualification
Sunday, 26 February 2017	12:50	Final 1
Sunday, 26 February 2017	13:25	Final 2

== Results ==
=== Qualification ===
Rank	Athlete	Score
1	Yuliya Galysheva (KAZ)	75.66
2	Sophie Ash (AUS)	74.70
3	Miki Ito (JPN)	74.61
4	Jakara Anthony (AUS)	74.24
5	Arisa Murata (JPN)	71.57
6	Kisara Sumiyoshi (JPN)	71.48
7	Seo Jung-hwa (KOR)	69.19
8	Hinako Tomitaka (JPN)	66.48
9	Seo Jee-won (KOR)	64.70
10	Gao Dongxue (CHN)	43.63
11	Ma Zhuoni (CHN)	33.45
12	Shao Huijun (CHN)	7.24

=== Final 1 ===
Rank	Athlete	Score
1	Yuliya Galysheva (KAZ)	79.75
2	Arisa Murata (JPN)	79.16
3	Miki Ito (JPN)	78.94
4	Jakara Anthony (AUS)	77.52
5	Sophie Ash (AUS)	75.86
6	Kisara Sumiyoshi (JPN)	75.35
7	Seo Jung-hwa (KOR)	73.00
8	Hinako Tomitaka (JPN)	70.87
9	Seo Jee-won (KOR)	66.23
10	Gao Dongxue (CHN)	16.90

=== Final 2 ===
Rank	Athlete	Score
1st place, gold medalist(s)	Arisa Murata (JPN)	79.37
2nd place, silver medalist(s)	Yuliya Galysheva (KAZ)	79.02
3rd place, bronze medalist(s)	Miki Ito (JPN)	75.52
4	Kisara Sumiyoshi (JPN)	74.60
5	Sophie Ash (AUS)	69.20
6	Jakara Anthony (AUS)	68.29
