= Snowboarding at the 2017 Asian Winter Games – Men's halfpipe =

Men's halfpipe at the 2017 Asian Winter Games
- Venue: Bankei Ski Area
- Dates: 25 February 2017
- Competitors: 8 from 3 nations

Medalists
gold medal	Zhang Yiwei	China
silver medal	Kweon Lee-jun	South Korea
bronze medal	Ayumu Nedefuji	Japan

The men's snowboard halfpipe competition at the 2017 Asian Winter Games in Sapporo, Japan was held on 25 February at the Bankei Ski Area.

== Schedule ==
All times are Japan Standard Time (UTC+09:00)

Date	Time	Event
Saturday, 25 February 2017	10:30	Qualification
Saturday, 25 February 2017	13:30	Final

== Results ==
=== Qualification ===
Rank	Athlete	Run 1	Run 2	Best
1	Lee Kwang-ki (KOR)	71.00	85.50	85.50
2	Kweon Lee-jun (KOR)	48.50	82.00	82.00
3	Zhang Yiwei (CHN)	81.50	15.25	81.50
4	Lee Min-sik (KOR)	74.00	80.50	80.50
5	Kim Ho-jun (KOR)	67.75	69.50	69.50
6	Ayumu Nedefuji (JPN)	54.50	68.25	68.25
7	Xu Dechao (CHN)	40.00	38.75	40.00
8	Huang Shiying (CHN)	38.75	39.50	39.50

=== Final ===
Rank	Athlete	Run 1	Run 2	Best
1st place, gold medalist(s)	Zhang Yiwei (CHN)	90.50	93.50	93.50
2nd place, silver medalist(s)	Kweon Lee-jun (KOR)	81.00	87.00	87.00
3rd place, bronze medalist(s)	Ayumu Nedefuji (JPN)	32.25	86.75	86.75
4	Lee Min-sik (KOR)	24.25	80.50	80.50
5	Kim Ho-jun (KOR)	74.25	19.25	74.25
6	Lee Kwang-ki (KOR)	73.75	11.50	73.75
7	Huang Shiying (CHN)	54.25	57.75	57.75
8	Xu Dechao (CHN)	52.00	5.75	52.00
