= Figure skating at the 2017 Asian Winter Games – Men's singles =

Men's singles at the 2017 Asian Winter Games
- Venue: Makomanai Ice Arena
- Dates: 24–26 February 2017
- Competitors: 21 from 12 nations

Medalists
gold medal	Shoma Uno	Japan
silver medal	Jin Boyang	China
bronze medal	Yan Han	China

The men's singles event at the 2017 Asian Winter Games was held on 24 and 26 February 2017 at the Makomanai Ice Arena in Sapporo, Japan.

== Schedule ==
All times are Japan Standard Time (UTC+09:00)

Date	Time	Event
Friday, 24 February 2017	18:05	Short program
Sunday, 26 February 2017	12:00	Free skating

== Results ==
Rank	Athlete	SP	FS	Total
1st place, gold medalist(s)	Shoma Uno (JPN)	92.43	188.84	281.27
2nd place, silver medalist(s)	Jin Boyang (CHN)	92.86	187.22	280.08
3rd place, bronze medalist(s)	Yan Han (CHN)	91.56	180.30	271.86
4	Takahito Mura (JPN)	90.32	172.99	263.31
5	Brendan Kerry (AUS)	82.74	154.63	237.37
6	Misha Ge (UZB)	76.18	157.75	233.93
7	Kim Jin-seo (KOR)	76.99	151.68	228.67
8	Julian Yee (MAS)	72.75	149.94	222.69
9	Michael Christian Martinez (PHI)	76.53	135.43	211.96
10	Denis Ten (KAZ)	72.98	125.90	198.88
11	Tsao Chih-i (TPE)	63.68	126.51	190.19
12	Abzal Rakimgaliev (KAZ)	54.80	134.79	189.59
13	Lee June-hyoung (KOR)	57.67	126.76	184.43
14	Chew Kai Xiang (MAS)	58.86	109.56	168.42
15	Harry Lee (HKG)	48.65	101.08	149.73
16	Lee Meng-ju (TPE)	44.49	93.92	138.41
17	Jules Alpe (PHI)	42.38	86.03	128.41
18	Leung Kwun Hung (HKG)	37.16	82.61	119.77
19	William Sutrisna (INA)	34.85	60.80	95.65
20	Dwiki Eka Ramadhan (INA)	24.07	64.65	88.72
21	Nikhil Pingle (IND)	17.30	41.74	59.04
