= Ski jumping at the 2017 Asian Winter Games – Men's large hill individual =

Men's large hill individual at the 2017 Asian Winter Games
- Venue: Okurayama Ski Jump Stadium
- Dates: 24 February 2017
- Competitors: 16 from 4 nations

Medalists
gold medal	Naoki Nakamura	Japan
silver medal	Yuken Iwasa	Japan
bronze medal	Marat Zhaparov	Kazakhstan

The men's large hill HS137 individual competition at the Ski jumping at the 2017 Asian Winter Games in Sapporo, Japan was held on 24 February at the Okurayama Ski Jump Stadium.

== Schedule ==
All times are Japan Standard Time (UTC+09:00)

Date	Time	Event
Friday, 24 February 2017	17:30	Final

== Results ==
Rank	Athlete	1st round		Final round		Total
Rank	Athlete	Distance	Score	Distance	Score	Total
1st place, gold medalist(s)	Naoki Nakamura (JPN)	141.5	142.8	123.0	112.5	255.3
2nd place, silver medalist(s)	Yuken Iwasa (JPN)	133.5	133.4	124.0	114.3	247.7
3rd place, bronze medalist(s)	Marat Zhaparov (KAZ)	130.5	126.0	127.0	119.7	245.7
4	Masamitsu Ito (JPN)	127.0	119.7	127.5	119.6	239.3
5	Choi Seo-u (KOR)	132.0	130.2	121.0	107.9	238.1
6	Sergey Tkachenko (KAZ)	129.0	118.8	122.0	109.2	228.0
7	Yukiya Sato (JPN)	133.0	132.0	112.0	84.7	216.7
8	Choi Heung-chul (KOR)	120.5	106.5	114.0	93.8	200.3
9	Kim Hyun-ki (KOR)	124.0	113.8	110.5	86.0	199.8
10	Konstantin Sokolenko (KAZ)	110.0	84.6	115.0	94.6	179.2
11	Tian Zhandong (CHN)	112.0	89.2	110.0	85.6	174.8
12	Sabirzhan Muminov (KAZ)	111.5	87.8	109.5	83.7	171.5
13	Lee Ju-chan (KOR)	100.0	63.1	103.0	70.0	133.1
14	Yang Guang (CHN)	92.5	49.1	95.0	54.6	103.7
15	Sun Jianping (CHN)	96.0	57.4	89.0	43.3	100.7
16	Li Chao (CHN)	88.0	40.0	73.5	11.4	51.4
