= Iran at the 2017 Asian Winter Games =

- IOC code: IRI
- NOC: National Olympic Committee of the Islamic Republic of Iran

in Sapporo
- Competitors: 10 in 1 sport
- Flag bearer: Hossein Saveh-Shemshaki
- Medals: Gold 0 Silver 0 Bronze 0 Total 0

Asian Winter Games appearances
- 1990; 1996; 1999; 2003; 2007; 2011; 2017; 2025; 2029

Iran competed in the 2017 Asian Winter Games in Sapporo, Japan from February 19 to 26. The country competed in one sport (two disciplines).

Alpine skier Hossein Saveh-Shemshaki was the country's flagbearer during the parade of nations at the opening ceremony.

Iran was scheduled to enter a cross-country skiing team. However, the FIS Nordic World Ski Championships 2017 in Lahti, Finland also happened during the games (between February 22 and March 5) which had caused Iran to not send a team at all. Iran was also scheduled to compete in ice hockey, however after arriving, more than half the team was deemed ineligible to represent the country due to eligibility issues. Thus the team was disqualified. However the country still played its matches as friendlies, but they did not count towards the standings.

== Competitors ==
Sport	Men	Women	Total
Alpine skiing	2	2	4
Snowboarding	4	2	6
Total	6	4	10

== Results by event ==
=== Skiing ===
==== Alpine ====
Athlete	Event	Run 1		Run 2		Total	
Athlete	Event	Time	Rank	Time	Rank	Time	Rank
Mohammad Kiadarbandsari	Men's slalom	48.53	7	53.00	8	1:41.53	7
Hossein Saveh-Shemshaki	Men's slalom	48.23	5	52.69	6	1:40.92	5
Mohammad Kiadarbandsari	Men's giant slalom	1:10.91	6	1:13.80	10	2:24.71	9
Hossein Saveh-Shemshaki	Men's giant slalom	1:12.24	11	1:13.54	9	2:25.78	10
Forough Abbasi	Women's slalom	56.60	13	1:00.60	10	1:57.20	12
Sadaf Saveh-Shemshaki	Women's slalom	58.34	15	1:01.98	13	2:00.32	13
Forough Abbasi	Women's giant slalom	1:26.18	15	1:20.94	14	2:47.12	14
Sadaf Saveh-Shemshaki	Women's giant slalom	1:23.91	14	1:19.07	13	2:42.98	13

==== Snowboarding ====
Athlete	Event	Run 1		Run 2		Total	
Athlete	Event	Time	Rank	Time	Rank	Time	Rank
Hassan Kalhor	Men's slalom	47.47	15	DSQ	—	—	—
Hossein Kalhor	Men's slalom	45.48	14	38.56	11	1:24.04	12
Hossein Kalhor	Men's slalom	DNF	—	—	—	—	—
Hossein Seid	Men's slalom	48.58	16	DNF	—	—	—
Hassan Kalhor	Men's giant slalom	56.56	14	DNF	—	—	—
Hossein Kalhor	Men's giant slalom	56.41	12	47.44	12	1:43.85	12
Hossein Kalhor	Men's giant slalom	56.52	13	47.39	11	1:43.91	13
Hossein Seid	Men's giant slalom	57.59	17	DSQ	—	—	—
Shima Yarkhah	Women's slalom	57.87	13	46.56	9	1:44.43	13
Setareh Yazdani	Women's slalom	51.86	10	46.94	10	1:38.80	10
Shima Yarkhah	Women's giant slalom	1:06.25	10	57.69	11	2:03.94	11
Setareh Yazdani	Women's giant slalom	1:05.15	8	1:02.19	12	2:07.34	12
