= Speed skating at the 2017 Asian Winter Games – Men's 10000 metres =

Men's 10000 metres at the 2017 Asian Winter Games
- Venue: Meiji Hokkaido-Tokachi Oval
- Dates: 22 February 2017
- Competitors: 8 from 6 nations

Medalists
gold medal	Lee Seung-hoon	South Korea
silver medal	Ryosuke Tsuchiya	Japan
bronze medal	Seitaro Ichinohe	Japan

The men's 10000 metres at the 2017 Asian Winter Games was held on 22 February 2017 in Obihiro, Japan.

== Schedule ==
All times are Japan Standard Time (UTC+09:00)

Date	Time	Event
Wednesday, 22 February 2017	13:00	Final

== Records ==
Prior to this competition, the existing world and Games records were as follows.

World Record	Ted-Jan Bloemen (CAN)	12:36.30	Salt Lake City, United States	21 November 2015
Games Record	Lee Seung-hoon (KOR)	13:09.74	Astana, Kazakhstan	5 February 2011

== Results ==
Rank	Pair	Athlete	Time	Notes
1st place, gold medalist(s)	2	Lee Seung-hoon (KOR)	13:18.56	
2nd place, silver medalist(s)	4	Ryosuke Tsuchiya (JPN)	13:23.74	
3rd place, bronze medalist(s)	3	Seitaro Ichinohe (JPN)	13:44.73	
4	3	Dmitriy Babenko (KAZ)	13:47.90	
5	2	Josh Capponi (AUS)	14:06.42	
6	4	Lee Jin-yeong (KOR)	14:14.13	
7	1	Wu Yu (CHN)	14:18.81	
8	1	Vishwaraj Jadeja (IND)	15:49.38	
