= Aanchal Thakur =

Indian alpine skier (born 1996)

Personal information
- Born: 28 August 1996 (age 30) Manali, Himachal Pradesh, India
- Height: 146 cm (4 ft 9 in) (2025)
- Weight: 46 kg (101 lb) (2025)

Skiing career
- Sport: Alpine skiing
- Disciplines: Slalom, giant slalom

World Championships
- Teams: 6 – (2013, 2015, 2017, 2021, 2023, 2025)
- Medals: 0

Aanchal Thakur (born 28 August 1996) is an Indian alpine skier. She represented India at the 2012 Winter Youth Olympics in Innsbruck, Austria. In Innsbruck, Thakur took part in the Alpine skiing - girl's slalom and girl's giant slalom events. Thakur became the first Indian skier to win a medal in an International Ski Federation event in 2018.

== Personal life ==
She is the sister of Indian international skier Himanshu Thakur who represented India at the 2014 Winter Olympics.

== Career ==
Thakur was named to India's 2017 Asian Winter Games team in February 2017.

In 2018, Thakur created history by becoming the first Indian skier ever to claim a medal in the international skiing event. She won the bronze medal in the 2018 Alpine Ejder 3200 Cup which was held in Turkey and was organised by the Federation Internationale de Ski.

Thakur won her second medal in the international skiing event at FIS Alpine Ski Competition held at Kolašin, Montenegro. She won the bronze medal at the 2021 event held in Montenegro under the banner of the Jamaican national championships.

Thakur won four silver medals at the UAE Alpine Slalom Championships held at Dubai in 2022 and thus qualified for the 2023 World Ski Championships. She also became the first Indian skier to win a silver medal in international skiing.

== Alpine skiing results ==
All results are sourced from the International Ski Federation (FIS).

=== World Championship results ===
Year	Age	Slalom	Giant slalom	Super-G	Downhill	Combined
2013	16	95	93	—	—	—
2015	18	DNF1	91	—	—	—
2017	20	BDNS1	77	—	—	—
2021	24	47	59	—	—	—
2023	26	81	DNQ	—	—	—
2025	28	DNF1	62	—	—	—

=== Asian Winter Games results ===
Year	Age	Slalom	Giant slalom	Super-G	Downhill	Combined
2017	20	DNF	16	—	—	—
2025	28	25	—	—	—	—
