= Sophie Ash =

Australian freestyle skier (born 1996)

Personal information
- Born: 7 November 1996 (age 29) Brisbane, Queensland, Australia
- Education: Victorian College of the Arts Secondary School
- Height: 161 cm (5 ft 3 in)

Sport
- Sport: Freestyle skiing

Sophie Ash (born 7 November 1996) is an Australian freestyle skier. She competed in the 2022 Winter Olympics.

== Career ==
Ash placed fifth in moguls and seventh in dual moguls at the 2017 Asian Winter Games. She finished 16th out of 20 competitors in the first final round in the women's moguls event at the 2022 Winter Olympics.

== Personal life ==
Ash attended the Victorian College of the Arts Secondary School and the Victorian College of the Arts, where she received a degree in animation. She released a film describing her experiences in international skiing competitions, "Start Gate", in 2019. Her sister Gabi is also a freestyle skier and competed at the 2022 Winter Olympics.
