= Kazumasa Sasaki =

Japanese ice hockey player

- Born: November 12, 1989 (age 36) Tomakomai, Japan
- Height: 5 ft 10 in (178 cm)
- Weight: 176 lb (80 kg; 12 st 8 lb)
- Position: Defenceman
- Shoots: Right
- ALIH team: Oji Eagles
- National team: Japan
- Playing career: 2012–present

Kazumasa Sasaki (佐々木一正; born December 11, 1989), is a Japanese professional ice hockey Defenceman currently playing for the Oji Eagles of the Asia League.

Since 2009 he plays for the Oji Eagles. He previously played for the Östersund/Brunflo IF in the Hockeyettan, the third-tier league in Sweden. He also has played for the Japan national team since the year 2012.
