= Eri Yanetani =

Japanese snowboarder (born 1984)

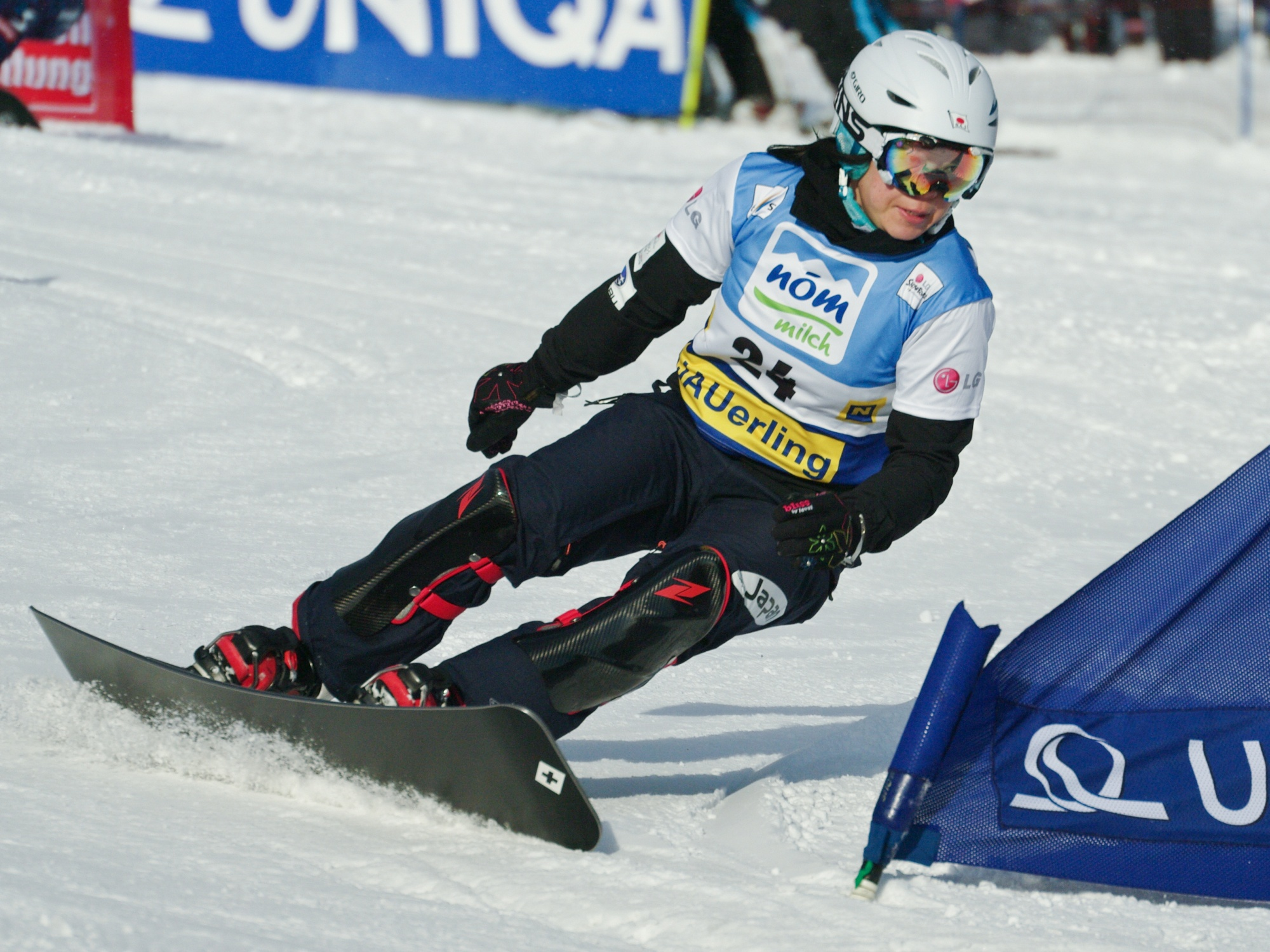
- Yanetani in 2012

Personal information
- Nationality: Japanese
- Born: June 7, 1984 (age 42) Kobe, Japan

Sport
- Sport: Snowboarding
Medal record
Asian Winter Games
Gold medal – first place	2017 Sapporo	Giant slalom
Silver medal – second place	2017 Sapporo	Slalom

Eri Yanetani (born 7 June 1984 in Kobe) is a Japanese snowboarder.

Yanetani competed in the women's parallel giant slalom event at the 2006 Winter Olympics, placing 18th, and the 2010 Winter Olympics, placing 21st.

At the 2017 Asian Winter Games she won a silver medal in the slalom event and a gold medal in the giant slalom event.
