= Nikhil Pingle =

Indian figure skater

Personal information
- Born: June 29, 1999 (age 27) Nashik, Maharashtra, India
- Home town: Nashik, Maharashtra, India
- Height: 171 cm (5 ft 7 in)

Figure skating career
- Country: India
- Coach: Michael Hopfes

Nikhil Pingle (born 29 June 1999) is an Indian figure skater. He started skating at the age of 7.He started with recreational skating and transitioned into competitive speed skating for a duration of 4 years. His experiences with speed skating made leeway for artistic roller skating. It led him to pursue figure skating where he has competed in a number of tournaments including the 2017 Asian Winter Games in Sapporo, Japan.

== Achievements ==
	Gold	Silver	Bronze
National	1	1	1
International	1	-	2

International Participations –

- ISU World Development Trophy 2014 – Manila, Philippines
- Asian Open Figure Skating Championship 2014 – Bangkok, Thailand
- ISU World Junior Grand Prix 2014 – Ostrava, Czech Republic
- ISU World Development Trophy 2015 – Manila, Philippines
- Malaysian Open Figure Skating Championship 2015 – Kuala Lumpur, Malaysia
- Asian Open Figure Skating Championship 2015 – Taipei, Taiwan
- ISU World Junior Grand Prix 2015 – Nagoya, Japan
- ISU World Development Trophy – Zagreb, Croatia
- 2017 Asian Winter Games, Sapporo, Japan
