= Himanshu Thakur =

Indian alpine skier (born 1994)

Personal information
- Born: 9 January 1994 (age 32) Manali, Himachal Pradesh, India

Skiing career
- Sport: Alpine skiing
- Disciplines: Slalom, giant slalom

Olympics
- Teams: 1 – (2014)
- Medals: 0

World Championships
- Teams: 3 – (2013, 2015, 2017)
- Medals: 0

Himanshu Thakur (born 9 January 1994 in Manali, Kullu district, Himachal Pradesh, India) is an alpine skier from India. He competed for India at the 2014 Winter Olympics in the giant slalom race securing a rank of 72.

Thakur was named to India's 2017 Asian Winter Games team in February 2017.

== Personal life ==
His sister Aanchal Thakur is also an international alpine skier.

== Alpine skiing results ==
All results are sourced from the International Ski Federation (FIS).

=== Olympic results ===
Year
Year	Age	Slalom	Giant; Slalom	Super-G	Downhill	Combined	Team Event
2014	20	—	72	—	—	—	—

=== World Championship results ===
Year	Age	Slalom	Giant slalom	Super-G	Downhill	Combined
2013	19	62	BDNF1	—	—	—
2015	21	BDNF1	70	—	—	—
2017	23	BDNS1	59	—	—	—
