= Kweon Lee-jun =

South Korean snowboarder

Personal information
- Nationality: South Korean
- Born: 24 October 1997 (age 28)
- Height: 1.80 m (5 ft 11 in)

Sport
- Sport: Snowboarding
Medal record
Representing South Korea
Winter Universiade
Silver medal – second place	2019 Krasnoyarsk	Halfpipe

Kweon Lee-jun (born 24 October 1997) is a South Korean snowboarder. He competed in the 2018 Winter Olympics.
