= Kyung Sung-hyun =

South Korean alpine skier (born 1990)

Personal information
- Born: June 10, 1990 (age 36) Seoul, South Korea
- Height: 1.76 m (5 ft 9 in) (5' 9'')
- Weight: 83 kg / 183 lb

Korean name
- Hangul: 경성현
- RR: Gyeong Seonghyeon
- MR: Kyŏng Sŏnghyŏn
Medal record
Alpine skiing
Representing South Korea

Kyung Sung-hyun (born June 10, 1990 in Seoul, South Korea) is an alpine skier from South Korea. He competed for South Korea at the 2014 Winter Olympics in the alpine skiing events.
