= Kim Hyeon-tae =

South Korean alpine skier (born 1990)

Personal information
- Born: 1990 (age 35–36)

Skiing career
- Sport: Alpine skiing

- Kim Hyeon-tae
- Hangul: 김현태
- RR: Gim Hyeontae
- MR: Kim Hyŏnt'ae

Kim Hyeon-tae (born 1990) is a South Korean alpine ski racer.

He competed at the 2015 World Championships in Beaver Creek, USA, in the giant slalom.
