= Kisara Sumiyoshi =

Japanese freestyle skier (born 2000)

Kisara Sumiyoshi 住吉輝紗良
Personal information
- Born: 8 March 2000 (age 25); Kutchan, Hokkaido, Japan

Sport
- Country: Japan
- Sport: Freestyle skiing
- Event: Moguls
- Club: Nihon University

Kisara Sumiyoshi (Japanese: 住吉 輝紗良; born 8 March 2000) is a Japanese freestyle skier who competes internationally.

She competed in the FIS Freestyle Ski and Snowboarding World Championships 2021, where she placed fourteenth in women's ski moguls.
