= Kim Eun-ho (skier) =

South Korean cross-country skier

Personal information
- Nationality: South Korean
- Born: 2 July 1996 (age 28)

Sport
- Sport: Cross-country skiing

Kim Eun-ho (born 2 July 1996) is a South Korean cross-country skier. He competed in the 2018 Winter Olympics.
