= Ayumu Nedefuji =

Japanese snowboarder (born 1994)

Personal information
- Born: April 7, 1994 (age 32) Otaru, Hokkaido, Japan

Sport
- Sport: Skiing
Medal record
Men's snowboarding
Representing Japan
Winter Universiade
Gold medal – first place	2015 Granada	Halfpipe

Ayumu Nedefuji (子出藤 歩夢, Nedefuji Ayumu; born 7 April 1994, in Otaru) is a Japanese snowboarder. He was a participant at the 2014 Winter Olympics in Sochi.
