= Kang Young-seo =

South Korean alpine skier (born 1997)

Personal information
- Born: July 19, 1997 (age 28) Seoul, South Korea
- Height: 1.68 m (5 ft 6 in) (5' 6'')
- Weight: 60 kg / 132 lb

Sport

Korean name
- Hangul: 강영서
- Hanja: 姜 英署
- RR: Gang Yeongseo
- MR: Kang Yŏngsŏ
Medal record
Alpine skiing
Representing South Korea

Kang Young-seo (born July 19, 1997 in Seoul, South Korea) is an alpine skier from South Korea. She competed for South Korea at the 2014 Winter Olympics in the alpine skiing events.

She is a contestant of the Korean show Physical: 100 - Season 2 Underground.
