= Li Xin (skier) =

Chinese cross-country skier

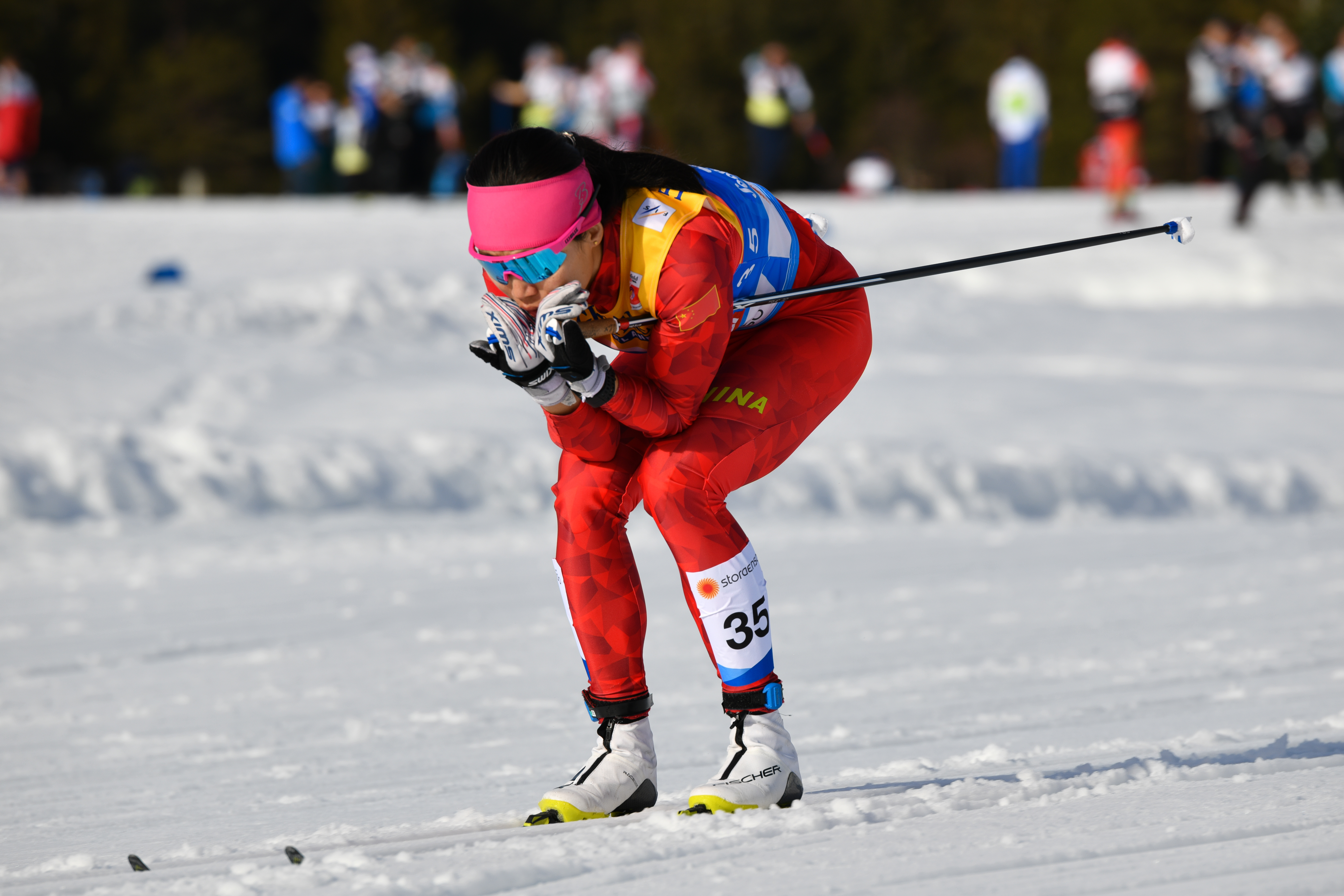
- Li Xin in February 2019

Medal record

Women's cross-country skiing

Representing China

Asian Winter Games
Silver medal – second place	2017 Sapporo	4×5 km relay
Bronze medal – third place	2011 Astana-Almaty	4×5 km relay

Li Xin (Chinese: 李馨; pinyin: Lǐ Xīn; Mandarin pronunciation: [lì ɕín]; born July 31, 1992) is a Chinese cross-country skier who has competed since 2007. She finished 65th in the 10 km event at the 2010 Winter Olympics in Vancouver, British Columbia, Canada. She competed at the 2022 Winter Olympics, in Women's 10 kilometre classical, Women's 30 kilometre freestyle, Women's 15 kilometre skiathlon, and Women's 4 × 5 kilometre relay.

She finished second in the 5 km qualification event at the FIS Nordic World Ski Championships 2009 in Liberec, Czech Republic. This allowed Li to qualify for the 10 km event the following day where she finished 55th though her best finish at those same championships was 38th in the 30 km event.

Li's best World Cup finish was 24th in a 10 km event at Changchun in 2007.
