= Shang Jincai =

Chinese cross-country skier

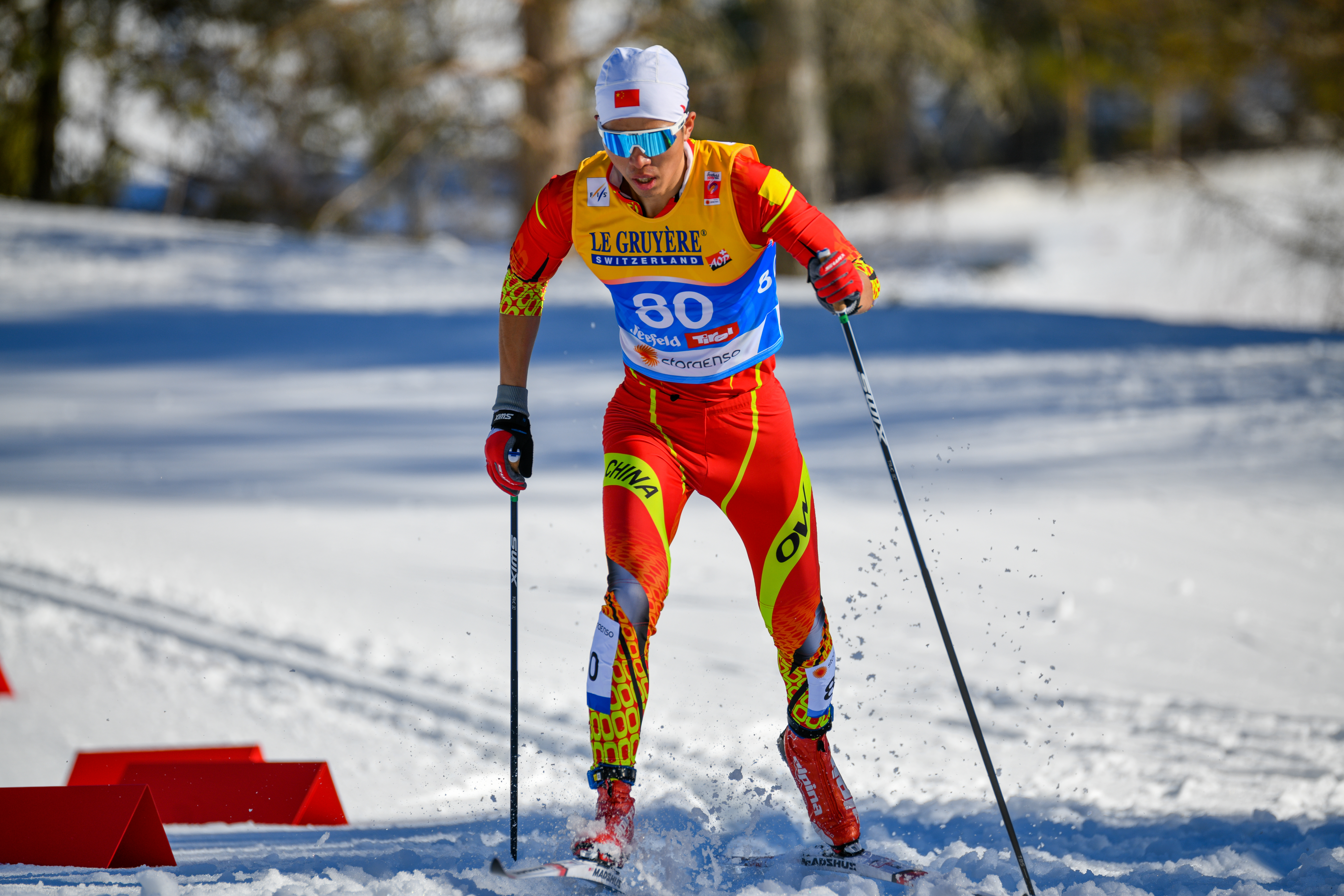

Personal information
- Nationality: China
- Born: 10 October 1993 (age 32)

Sport
- Sport: Skiing

World Cup career
- Seasons: 7 – (2015–2020, 2022–present)
- Indiv. starts: 37
- Indiv. podiums: 0
- Team starts: 4
- Team podiums: 0
- Overall titles: 0 – (135th in 2022)
- Discipline titles: 0
- Updated on 21 March 2022

Shang Jincai (Chinese: 尚金财, born 10 October 1993) is a Chinese cross-country skier who competes internationally.

He represented his country at the 2022 Winter Olympics.

== Cross-country skiing results ==
All results are sourced from the International Ski Federation (FIS).

=== Olympic Games ===
Year	Age	15 km individual	30 km skiathlon	50 km mass start	Sprint	4 × 10 km relay	Team sprint
2022	28	41	49	—^{[a]}	67	13	13

^{a} Distance reduced to 30 km due to weather conditions.

=== World Championships ===
Year	Age	15 km individual	30 km skiathlon	50 km mass start	Sprint	4 × 10 km relay	Team sprint
2015	21	76	58	—	80	—	27
2019	25	54	—	DNF	73	13	—

=== World Cup ===
==== Season standings ====
Season	Age	Discipline standings				Ski Tour standings				
Season	Age	Overall	Distance	Sprint	U23	Nordic Opening	Tour de Ski	Ski Tour 2020	World Cup Final	Ski Tour Canada
2015	21	NC	NC	NC	NC	DNF	—	—N/a	—N/a	—N/a
2016	22	NC	NC	NC	NC	DNF	—	—N/a	—N/a	—
2017	23	NC	NC	NC	—N/a	—	—	—N/a	—	—N/a
2018	24	NC	NC	NC	—N/a	DNF	—	—N/a	—	—N/a
2019	25	NC	NC	NC	—N/a	—	—	—N/a	—	—N/a
2020	26	NC	NC	NC	—N/a	DNF	—	53	—N/a	—N/a
2022	28	135	NC	80	—N/a	—N/a	—	—N/a	—N/a	—N/a
