= Arisa Murata =

Japanese freestyle skier (born 1990)

Personal information
- Born: October 17, 1990 (age 35) Kitakyushu, Japan

Sport
- Sport: Skiing

World Cup career
- Indiv. podiums: 1
- Updated on July 24, 2013

Arisa Murata (村田 愛里咲, Murata Arisa; born October 17, 1990 in Kitakyushu) is a Japanese freestyle skier, specializing in moguls.

Murata competed at the 2010 Winter Olympics for Japan. She placed 11th in the qualifying round of the moguls, advancing to the final, where she placed 8th.

As of April 2013, her best showing at the World Championships is 5th, in the 2013 dual moguls event.

Murata made her World Cup debut in February 2008. As of March 2013, she has one World Cup podium finish, taking bronze in the moguls event at Are in 2011/12. Her best World Cup overall finish in moguls is 15th, in 2012/13.

== World Cup podiums ==
Date	Location	Rank	Event
9 March 2012	Are	3rd place, bronze medalist(s)	Moguls
