= Emi Hasegawa =

Japanese alpine skier (born 1986)

Personal information
- Born: 8 May 1986 (age 40) Yuzawa, Japan

Skiing career
- Sport: Alpine skiing
- Club: Sunmillion Ski Club
- Disciplines: Slalom, giant slalom
World Cup debut
| 15 December 2008 (age 22) |

World Championships
- Teams: 2 – (2011, 2015)
- Medals: 0

World Cup
- Seasons: 4th – (2013–16)
- Wins: 0
- Podiums: 0
- Overall titles: 0 – (78th in 2016)
- Discipline titles: 0 – (35th in SL, 2016)

Emi Hasegawa (born 8 May 1986) is a Japanese alpine ski racer. She competed at the 2011 World Championships in Garmisch-Partenkirchen, Germany in the slalom and giant slalom. She competed at the 2015 World Championships in Beaver Creek, USA, in the giant slalom.

== Career ==
She made her World Cup debut on 15 December 2008 in Levi, Finland. At the 2011 FIS Alpine World Ski Championships she was disqualified during the first run of the slalom and finished 41st in the giant slalom. At the 2015 FIS Alpine World Ski Championships she finished 28th in the giant slalom.

== World Cup results ==
| Season | Age | Overall | Slalom | Giant slalom | Super-G | Downhill | Combined |
|---|---|---|---|---|---|---|---|
| 2009 | 22 | — | — | — | — | — | — |
| 2010 | 23 | — | — | — | — | — | — |
| 2011 | 24 | — | — | — | — | — | — |
| 2012 | 25 | — | — | — | — | — | — |
| 2013 | 26 | 109 | 50 | — | — | — | — |
| 2014 | 27 | 116 | — | 50 | — | — | — |
| 2015 | 28 | 101 | 50 | 41 | — | — | — |
| 2016 | 29 | 78 | 35 | 37 | — | — | — |

== World Championship results ==
| Year | Age | Slalom | Giant slalom | Super-G | Downhill | Combined |
|---|---|---|---|---|---|---|
| 2011 | 24 | DSQ1 | 41 | — | — | — |
| 2015 | 28 | — | 28 | — | — | — |
