= Kohei Shimizu (skier) =

Japanese cross-country skier (born 1989)

Personal information
- Born: 25 January 1989 (age 37)
Medal record
Men's cross-country skiing
Representing Japan
Asian Winter Games
Silver medal – second place	2011 Astana-Almaty	4×10 km relay
Bronze medal – third place	2017 Sapporo	10 km

Kohei Shimizu (清水 康平, Shimizu Kōhei; born 25 January 1989) is a Japanese cross-country skier.

At the 2011 Asian Winter Games he won a silver medal in the 4 x 10 kilometre relay event, together with Keishin Yoshida, Masaya Kimura, and Nobu Naruse, behind the Kazakhstani team.

He competed at the FIS Nordic World Ski Championships 2011 in Oslo.
