= Pakistan at the 2017 Asian Winter Games =

- IOC code: PAK
- NOC: Pakistan Olympic Association

in Sapporo and Obihiro 19–26 February
- Competitors: 12 in 2 sports
- Medals: Gold 0 Silver 0 Bronze 0 Total 0

Asian Winter Games appearances
- 1996; 1999; 2003; 2007; 2011; 2017; 2025; 2029

Pakistan competed in the 2017 Asian Winter Games in Sapporo and Obihiro, Japan from 19 to 26 February. The country competed in one sport (two disciplines).

The Pakistani team consisted of 12 athletes (8 men and 4 women). This will be the first winter continental or global multi-sporting event in which Pakistan's team consists of women.

== Competitors ==
The following table lists the Pakistani delegation per sport and gender.

| Sport | Men | Women | Total |
|---|---|---|---|
| Alpine skiing | 4 | 4 | 8 |
| Cross-country skiing | 4 | 0 | 4 |
| Total | 8 | 4 | 12 |

== Alpine skiing ==
Pakistan's alpine skiing squad consists of athletes (8 men and 4 women). The team is led by 2014 Winter Olympics participant Muhammad Karim.

Men

| Athlete | Event | Run 1 | | Run 2 | | Total | |
| Athlete | Event | Time | Rank | Time | Rank | Time | Rank |
|---|---|---|---|---|---|---|---|
| Zahid Abbas | Giant slalom | 1:31.89 | 32 | 1:32.07 | 28 | 3:03.96 | 28 |
| Zahid Abbas | Slalom | 1:08.01 | 25 | DNF | | | |
| Waqas Azam | Giant slalom | 1:25.23 | 29 | 1:28.20 | 26 | 2:53.43 | 25 |
| Waqas Azam | Slalom | 1:07.85 | 24 | 1:11.84 | 21 | 2:19.69 | 21 |
| Muhammad Karim | Giant slalom | 1:15.29 | 15 | DNF | | | |
| Muhammad Karim | Slalom | DNF | | | | | |
| Mir Nawaz | Giant slalom | DNF | | | | | |
| Mir Nawaz | Slalom | 1:00.21 | 18 | 1:02.93 | 13 | 2:03.14 | 13 |

Women

| Athlete | Event | Run 1 | | Run 2 | | Total | |
| Athlete | Event | Time | Rank | Time | Rank | Time | Rank |
|---|---|---|---|---|---|---|---|
| Fatima Sohail | Giant slalom | 2:01.96 | 24 | 1:59.90 | 23 | 4:01.86 | 23 |
| Fatima Sohail | Slalom | 1:35.53 | 27 | 1:49.85 | 23 | 3:25.38 | 23 |
| Zainab Sohail | Giant slalom | 2:09.15 | 26 | 2:02.53 | 24 | 4:11.68 | 24 |
| Zainab Sohail | Slalom | DNF | | | | | |
| Ifrah Wali | Giant slalom | 1:52.99 | 23 | 1:49.40 | 21 | 3:42.39 | 21 |
| Ifrah Wali | Slalom | 1:22.35 | 25 | 1:31.24 | 20 | 2:53.59 | 21 |
| Umama Wali | Giant slalom | DNF | | | | | |
| Umama Wali | Slalom | 1:38.61 | 28 | DNF | | | |

== Cross-country skiing ==
Pakistan's cross-country skiing team consists of four male athletes.

Men

- Fazal Haq
- Imran Khan
- Ishaq Khan
- Muhammad Zubair

== See also ==
- Pakistan at the 2018 Winter Olympics
