= Hwang Jun-ho (skier) =

South Korean cross-country skier (born 1993)

Hwang Jun-Ho
Personal information
- Born: August 3, 1993 (age 32)
- Height: 1.81 m (5 ft 11 in)
- Weight: 71 kg (157 lb)

Sport
- Country: South Korea
- Sport: Cross-country skiing

Hwang Jun-ho (born August 3, 1993) is a cross-country skier from South Korea. He competed for South Korea at the 2014 Winter Olympics in the cross country skiing events.
