= Akira Lenting =

Japanese cross-country skier (born 1990)

Personal information
- Born: August 11, 1990 (age 35) Tokyo, Japan
- Height: 182 cm (6 ft 0 in)
- Weight: 77 kg (170 lb)

Sport
- Country: Japan
- Sport: Cross-country skiing

Akira Lenting (レンティング陽; born August 11, 1990) is a cross country skier from Japan. He competed for Japan at the 2014 Winter Olympics in the cross country skiing events.
