= Ju Hye-ri =

South Korean cross-country skier

Personal information
- Nationality: South Korean
- Born: 21 February 1991 (age 34)

Sport
- Sport: Cross-country skiing

Ju Hye-ri (born 21 February 1991) is a South Korean cross-country skier. She competed in the 2018 Winter Olympics.
