= Kyrgyzstan at the 2017 Asian Winter Games =

- IOC code: KGZ
- NOC: National Olympic Committee of the Republic of Kyrgyzstan

in Sapporo and Obihiro February 19–26
- Competitors: 33 in 4 sports
- Flag bearer: Elzar Bolotbekov
- Medals: Gold 0 Silver 0 Bronze 0 Total 0

Asian Winter Games appearances
- 1996; 1999; 2003; 2007; 2011; 2017; 2025; 2029

Kyrgyzstan is scheduled to compete in the 2017 Asian Winter Games in Sapporo and Obihiro, Japan from February 19 to 26. The country is scheduled to compete in four sports (four disciplines). The team consists of 33 athletes, a drop of 19 athletes from the previous edition of the games in 2011. The Kyrgyzstani government plans on spending 8,737,000 Kyrgyzstani som on the team's participation at the games.

On February 1, 2017 it was announced that ice hockey player Elzar Bolotbekov would be the country's flagbearer during the parade of nations at the opening ceremony.

== Competitors ==
The following table lists the Kyrgyzstani delegation per sport and gender.

Sport	Men	Women	Total
Alpine skiing	2	2	4
Biathlon	2	2	4
Figure skating	0	2	2
Ice hockey	23	0	23
Total	27	6	33

== Alpine skiing ==
Kyrgyzstan's alpine skiing team consists of four athletes (two men and two women).

Men

- Maxim Gordeev
- Evgeniy Timofeev

Women

- Olga Paliutkina
- Dariha Muratalieva

== Biathlon ==
Kyrgyzstan's biathlon team consists of four athletes. Both Kunduz Abdykadyrova and Tariel Zharkymbaev will also compete in the cross-country skiing competitions.

Men

- Tariel Zharkymbaev
- Nurbek Doolatov

Women

- Kunduz Abdykadyrova
- Natalia Levdanskaia

== Figure skating ==
Kyrgyzstan's figure skating team consists of two athletes in the women's singles event.

Athlete(s)	Event	SP		FS		Total	
Athlete(s)	Event	Points	Rank	Points	Rank	Points	Rank
Laura Ismagulova	Ladies	18.53	23	42.44	23	60.97	23
Aleksandra Nesterova	Ladies	18.53	21	48.46	19	70.15	21

== Ice hockey ==
Kyrgyzstan has entered a men's hockey team. The team will compete in division two. Kyrgyzstan finished in second place (12th place overall) in division 2 of the competition.

=== Men's tournament ===
Kyrgyzstan was represented by the following 23 athletes:

- Elzar Bolotbekov (G)
- Rinat Mustafaev (G)
- Adilet Uulu Zhyrgalbek (G)
- Amanbek Uulu Esen (D)
- Adis Kachkynbekov (D)
- Oleg Kolodii (D)
- Vladimir Nichipurenko (D)
- Zalkarbek Uulu Salmorbek (D)
- Urmat Sheishenaliev (D)
- Uran Tursunbekov (D)
- Adilet Zhookaev (D)
- Kanat Uulu Abylmechin (F)
- Duulat Abyshev (F)
- Nurzhan Ibraimovv (F)
- Atai Ismaiilov (F)
- Adilet Uulu Kazybek (F)
- Anton Kudashev (F)
- Beknazar Paizov (F)
- Artem Semiletko (F)
- Aibek Shakirov (F)
- Daniil Shushenkov (F)
- Taalaibek Suiunbaev (F)
- Salamat Tynaliev (F)

Legend: G = Goalie, D = Defense, F = Forward

Group A

Rank	Team	Pld	W	OW	OL	L	GF	GA	GD	Pts
1	Kyrgyzstan	3	3	0	0	0	22	7	+15	9
2	Philippines	3	2	0	0	1	27	15	+12	6
3	(International Olympic Committee) Independent Olympic Athletes	3	1	0	0	2	9	15	–6	3
4	Qatar	3	0	0	0	3	6	27	–21	0

18 February 2017; 20:00	Independent Olympic Athletes (International Olympic Committee)	0–5 (0–1, 0–3, 0–1)	Kyrgyzstan	Hoshioki Ice Skating Rink; Attendance: 104

Game reference
			Referee: (South Korea) Lee Joo-hyun; Linesmen: (Japan) Shiiya Kenichi (Finland) Jussi Thomann
60 min	Penalties	71 min	Referee: (South Korea) Lee Joo-hyun; Linesmen: (Japan) Shiiya Kenichi (Finland) Jussi Thomann
19	Shots	48	Referee: (South Korea) Lee Joo-hyun; Linesmen: (Japan) Shiiya Kenichi (Finland) Jussi Thomann

21 February 2017; 20:00	Kyrgyzstan	10–5 (6–1, 1–3, 3–1)	Philippines	Hoshioki Ice Skating Rink; Attendance: 86

Game reference
20 min	Penalties	28 min
39	Shots	27

24 February 2017; 16:30	Kyrgyzstan	7–2 (2–0, 4–0, 1–2)	Qatar	Hoshioki Ice Skating Rink; Attendance: 68

Game reference
26 min	Penalties	14 min
55	Shots	24

11th place match

26 February 2017; 12:30	Kyrgyzstan	3–7 (2–2, 0–1, 1–4)	Turkmenistan	Hoshioki Ice Skating Rink; Attendance: 243

Game reference
46 min	Penalties	18 min
26	Shots	64
