= Mongolia at the 2017 Asian Winter Games =

- IOC code: MGL
- NOC: Mongolian National Olympic Committee

in Sapporo and Obihiro February 19–26
- Competitors: 46 in 4 sports
- Flag bearer: Erdenechimeg Barkhuu
- Medals: Gold 0 Silver 0 Bronze 0 Total 0

Asian Winter Games appearances
- 1986; 1990; 1996; 1999; 2003; 2007; 2011; 2017; 2025; 2029

Mongolia is scheduled to compete in the 2017 Asian Winter Games in Sapporo and Obihiro, Japan from February 19 to 26. Mongolia is scheduled to compete in four sports (seven disciplines). The Mongolian team consists of 46 athletes, six less than the number the country sent to the last games six years ago.

On February 16, 2017, it was announced that biathlete Erdenechimeg Barkhuu would be the country's flagbearer during the parade of nations at the opening ceremony. Barkhuu will become the first biathlete to carry the national flag at an opening ceremony.

== Competitors ==
The following table lists the Mongolian delegation per sport and gender.

Sport	Men	Women	Total
Alpine skiing	3	2	5
Biathlon	4	3	7
Cross-country skiing	2	4	6
Freestyle skiing	2	0	2
Ice hockey	18	0	18
Short track speed skating	0	1	1
Speed skating	4	3	7
Total	33	13	46

== Ice hockey ==
Mongolia has entered a men's team. The team will compete in division one. Mongolia finished in fourth place (8th place overall) in division 1 of the competition.

=== Men's tournament ===
Mongolia was represented by the following 18 athletes:

- Baatarkhuu Bazarvaani (G)
- Munkhbold Bayarsaikhan (G)
- Batgerel Zorigt (D)
- Boldbayar Bayajikh (D)
- Enkhsukh Erdenetogtokh (D)
- Och Tsendbaatar (D)
- Zolboo Dorjsuren (D)
- Tamir Ganbold (D)
- Munkhuu Boldbaatar (D)
- Gerelt Ider (F)
- Altangerel Ichinnorov (F)
- Erdenesukh Bold (F)
- Shinebayar Tsogtoo (F)
- Batzaya Purevdorj (F)
- Bayarsaikhan Jargalsaikhan (F)
- Mishigsuren Namjil (F)
- Batbold Munkhbayar (F)
- Tserenbaljir Baatarkhuu (F)

Legend: G = Goalie, D = Defense, F = Forward

Rank	Team	Pld	W	OW	OL	L	GF	GA	GD	Pts
5	Thailand	5	4	1	0	0	36	12	+24	14
6	Chinese Taipei	5	3	1	1	0	34	13	+21	12
7	United Arab Emirates	5	3	0	0	2	29	24	+5	9
8	Mongolia	5	2	0	0	3	25	23	+2	6
9	Hong Kong	5	1	0	1	3	27	27	0	4
10	Singapore	5	0	0	0	5	4	56	–52	0

18 February 2017; 19:00	Thailand	5–4 (1–1, 3–1, 1–2)	Mongolia	Mikaho Gymnasium; Attendance: 200

Game reference
			Referee: (South Korea) Chang Sung-kuk; Linesmen: (Japan) Sawayama Naoki (Switzerland) Dominik Altmann
14 min	Penalties	18 min	Referee: (South Korea) Chang Sung-kuk; Linesmen: (Japan) Sawayama Naoki (Switzerland) Dominik Altmann
43	Shots	27	Referee: (South Korea) Chang Sung-kuk; Linesmen: (Japan) Sawayama Naoki (Switzerland) Dominik Altmann

20 February 2017; 15:30	Mongolia	8–0 (2–0, 4–0, 2–0)	Singapore	Mikaho Gymnasium; Attendance: 240

Game reference
14 min	Penalties	66 min
41	Shots	10

21 February 2017; 19:00	United Arab Emirates	6–3 (3–0, 1–1, 2–2)	Mongolia	Mikaho Gymnasium; Attendance: 200

Game reference
16 min	Penalties	14 min
24	Shots	52

23 February 2017; 15:30	Mongolia	8–6 (6–2, 1–2, 1–2)	Hong Kong	Mikaho Gymnasium; Attendance: 280

Game reference
8 min	Penalties	36 min
38	Shots	30

25 February 2017; 12:00	Mongolia	2–6 (0–1, 1–2, 1–3)	Chinese Taipei	Mikaho Gymnasium; Attendance: 500

Game reference
14 min	Penalties	14 min
23	Shots	28

== Speed skating ==
Mongolia's speed skating team consisted of seven athletes (four men and three women). However, only four eventually competed in races.
