= Sapporo Teine =

Ski resort and amusement park in Teine-ku, Sapporo, Japan

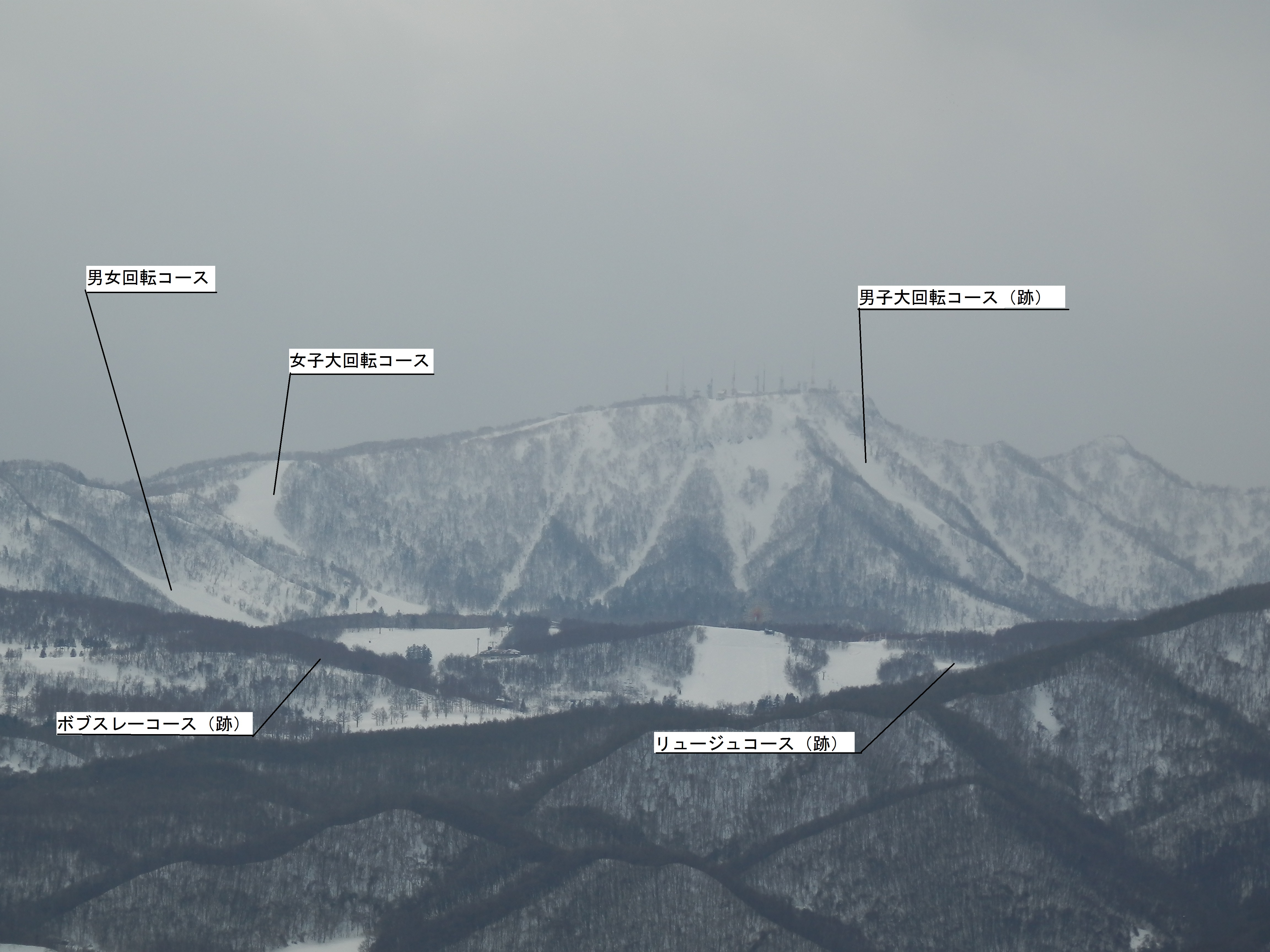

- Location in Japan
- Location: Sapporo, Hokkaido, Japan
- Coordinates: 43.084°N 141.205°E
- Vertical: 683 m (2,241 ft)
- Top elevation: 1,023 m (3,356 ft)
- Base elevation: 340 m (1,115 ft)
- Skiable area: 76 ha (190 acres)
- Trails: 15
- Longest run: 5.4 km (3.4 mi)
- Lift system: 13
- Website: sapporo-teine.com

Sapporo Teine (サッポロテイネ) is a recreational center in Teine-ku, Sapporo, Hokkaido, Japan. It comprises many facilities, such as the ski resort (with other facilities, besides ski), the Teineyama Ropeway, and the Sapporo Teine Golf Club fields.

The ski resort has a summit elevation of 1,023 metres (3,356 ft), located on Mt. Teine, in western Sapporo. Currently skiing and snowboarding can be performed here. In 1972, Mt. Teine was the site of the first Winter Olympic Games in Asia and hosted the giant slalom and slalom events in alpine skiing.

== Facilities ==
Sapporo Teine ski resort is separated into the Highland Zone, and the Olympia Zone. Also, connecting the 2 zones is the Rainbow Course, a super long course with a maximum run length of 5.4 km (3.4 mi) from the summit. Other facilities at the ski resort are Highland Ski Center (with lift ticket sales, rental gear, shop, restaurant, coin lockers, nursery, etc.), Olympia House and North Maple (restaurants), Hot Café 1024 (cafeteria), the General Information Booth, and Pandaruman (kid's winter park; snow play, skiing, etc.).

The Highland Zone comprises various courses intended for skiers of different skill levels. It is also notable for its view of the city below.

The Olympia Zone, includes both intermediate and advanced levels courses. At this zone is located the Olympic flame-holder, exactly as it did during the games.

Both zones are open to the public (for skiing and snowboarding practice), between early December and late March, every year.

== 1972 Winter Olympics ==
The 1972 Winter Olympics were held 54 years ago in Sapporo, and Mount Teine hosted the alpine skiing (giant slalom and slalom only), bobsleigh, and luge events (Note: The bobsleigh and luge tracks used for these Winter Olympics were separate tracks.).

=== Alpine skiing ===
The first skiing courses were constructed between 1968 and the end of 1970. The slalom courses had an elevation difference of 300 metres (980 ft) while the elevation differences for the men's and women's giant slalom were 400 and 300 metres (1,310 and 980 ft), respectively. Requiring additional vertical drop, the downhill events were run on Mount Eniwa.

After the Olympics, Teine has held many important ski events such as; Winter Universiade, Asian Winter Games, and other FIS official competition (the International Miyasama Ski Games), as well as being one of the main facilities for regional and national ski competitions.

=== Bobsleigh and luge tracks ===
The tracks were constructed between October 1969 and January 1972. Costing ¥ 433 million to complete, the bobsleigh track was constructed of reinforced concrete, which took 60 ice workers twenty days to create ice that was 13.5 cm (5.3 in) thick. A total of 127 lamps were used to highlight the course for night runs. Costing ¥ 277 million to complete, the luge track was constructed of reinforced concrete and took 1000 man-days to create ice.

Physical statistics
| Sport | Length | Turns | Vertical drop | Average grade (%) |
|---|---|---|---|---|
| Bobsleigh | 1.563 km (0.971 mi) | 14 | 132 m (433 ft) | 8.4 |
| Luge - men's singles | 1.023 km (0.636 mi) | 14 | 101 m (331 ft) | 9.9 |
| Luge - women's singles/ men's doubles | 0.763 km (0.474 mi) | 11 | Not listed | Not listed |

No turn names were given for the tracks.

After Nagano was awarded the 1998 Winter Olympics in 1991, the tracks were dismantled.

== Access ==
- JR Bus: 20 minutes from Teine Station (JR Hokkaido) to Teine Olympia mae Bus stop.
