= Shirahatayama Open Stadium =

Ski course in Sapporo, Japan

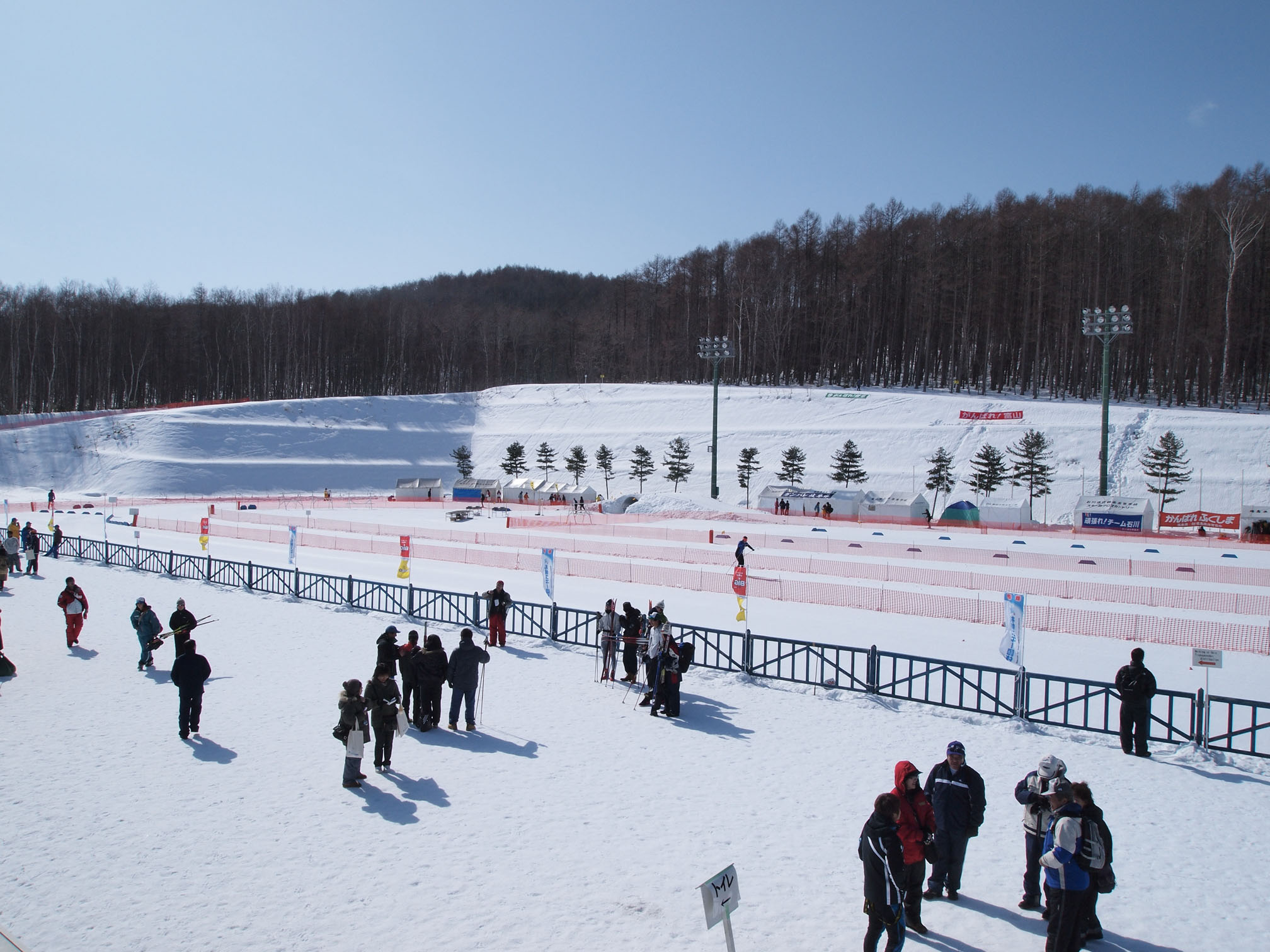
- Interactive map of Shirahatayama Open Stadium
- Location: Sapporo, Japan
- Coordinates: 42°57′40″N 141°25′57″E

Construction
- Opened: 1990

Shirahatayama Open Stadium is a cross-country skiing venue in Sapporo, Japan. It was opened in 1990 and was Asia's first FIS-certified course. The course is approximately 25 km and wraps around Mt. Shirahata. The venue hosted the 1990 Asian Winter Games, 1991 Winter Universiade and the FIS Nordic World Ski Championships 2007. The venue hosted the cross-country skiing events at the 2017 Asian Winter Games.
