= Lebanon at the 2017 Asian Winter Games =

- IOC code: LBN
- NOC: Lebanese Olympic Committee

in Sapporo and Obihiro February 19–26
- Competitors: 8 in 3 sports
- Flag bearer: Samer Tawk(Opening Ceremony) Volunteer(Closing Ceremony)
- Medals: Gold 0 Silver 0 Bronze 0 Total 0

Asian Winter Games appearances
- 1996; 1999; 2003; 2007; 2011; 2017; 2025; 2029

Lebanon is scheduled to compete in the 2017 Asian Winter Games in Sapporo and Obihiro, Japan from February 19 to 26. The country is scheduled to compete in one sport (three disciplines). The team will consist of eight athletes (four men and four women). The team was officially named by the Lebanese Olympic Committee on January 30, 2017, and later on February 7, the team was introduced officially.

== Background ==
With the FIS Alpine World Ski Championships 2017 being held close to these games, the Lebanese Ski Federation opted to send its top four male and female athletes to the World Championships. The fifth and sixth ranked athletes per gender, according to results from 2015 and 2016 were selected to compete at these games.

== Competitors ==
The following table lists the Lebanese delegation per sport and gender.

Sport	Men	Women	Total
Alpine skiing	2	2	4
Cross-country skiing	1	1	2
Snowboarding	1	1	2
Total	4	4	8

== Alpine skiing ==
Lebanon's alpine skiing team consists of four athletes (two men and two women).

Men

- Raul Anis Asmar
- Cyril Kayrouz

Women

- Sophia Marie Fayad
- Carlie Maria Iskandar

== Cross-country skiing ==
Lebanon's cross-country skiing team consists of two athletes (one man and one woman).

Man

- Samer Tawk

Woman

- Lea Rahme

== Snowboarding ==
Lebanon's snowboarding team consists of two athletes (one man and one woman).

Athlete	Event	Run 1		Run 2		Total	
Athlete	Event	Time	Rank	Time	Rank	Time	Rank
Nafez Tauk	Men's giant slalom	1:16.38	21	1:04.13	19	2:20.51	19
Nafez Tauk	Men's slalom	1:02.00	20	51.46	16	1:53.46	16
Uguette Fakhry	Women's giant slalom	1:26.33	13	1:19.27	13	2:45.60	13
Uguette Fakhry	Women's slalom	1:10.69	14	58.94	14	2:09.63	14
