= Short-track speed skating at the 2017 Asian Winter Games – Women's 500 metres =

Women's 500 metres at the 2017 Asian Winter Games
- Venue: Makomanai Ice Arena
- Dates: 21 February 2017
- Competitors: 25 from 12 nations

Medalists
| gold medal | Zang Yize | China |
| silver medal | Ayuko Ito | Japan |
| bronze medal | Choi Min-jeong | South Korea |

The women's 500 metres at the 2017 Asian Winter Games was held on February 21, 2017 in Sapporo, Japan.

== Schedule ==
All times are Japan Standard Time (UTC+09:00)

| Date | Time | Event |
|---|---|---|
| Tuesday, 21 February 2017 | 13:02 | Heats |
| Tuesday, 21 February 2017 | 14:13 | Quarterfinals |
| Tuesday, 21 February 2017 | 14:50 | Semifinals |
| Tuesday, 21 February 2017 | 15:19 | Finals |

== Results ==
Legend

- PEN — Penalty

=== Heats ===
- Qualification: 1–2 + Two best 3 → Quarterfinals (Q + q)

==== Heat 1 ====
| Rank | Athlete | Time | Notes |
|---|---|---|---|
| 1 | Ayuko Ito (JPN) | 45.026 | Q |
| 2 | Anja Chong (MAS) | 48.357 | Q |
| 3 | Lu Chia-tung (TPE) | 48.582 | |

==== Heat 2 ====
| Rank | Athlete | Time | Notes |
|---|---|---|---|
| 1 | Choi Min-jeong (KOR) | 44.265 | Q |
| 2 | Lin Yu-tzu (TPE) | 47.915 | Q |
| 3 | Kathryn Magno (PHI) | 54.031 | |

==== Heat 3 ====
| Rank | Athlete | Time | Notes |
|---|---|---|---|
| 1 | Fan Kexin (CHN) | 43.939 | Q |
| 2 | Kim Ji-yoo (KOR) | 43.990 | Q |
| 3 | Kim Iong-a (KAZ) | 44.776 | q |

==== Heat 4 ====
| Rank | Athlete | Time | Notes |
|---|---|---|---|
| 1 | Shim Suk-hee (KOR) | 43.927 | Q |
| 2 | Moemi Kikuchi (JPN) | 45.351 | Q |
| 3 | Nor Marissa Alia (MAS) | 55.653 | |
| 4 | Alifia Meidia Namasta (INA) | 56.830 | |

==== Heat 5 ====
| Rank | Athlete | Time | Notes |
|---|---|---|---|
| 1 | Anastassiya Krestova (KAZ) | 45.175 | Q |
| 2 | Deanna Lockett (AUS) | 45.205 | Q |
| 3 | Wang Kuan-ming (TPE) | 52.715 | |
| 4 | Ashley Chin (MAS) | 1:11.252 | |

==== Heat 6 ====
| Rank | Athlete | Time | Notes |
|---|---|---|---|
| 1 | Zang Yize (CHN) | 45.173 | Q |
| 2 | Cheyenne Goh (SGP) | 50.878 | Q |
| 3 | Varsha S. Puranik (IND) | 54.445 | |
| 4 | Battulgyn Gereltuyaa (MGL) | 1:16.386 | |

==== Heat 7 ====
| Rank | Athlete | Time | Notes |
|---|---|---|---|
| 1 | Sumire Kikuchi (JPN) | 44.643 | Q |
| 2 | Guo Yihan (CHN) | 44.722 | Q |
| 3 | Anita Nagay (KAZ) | 47.061 | q |
| 4 | Rahmah Osya Samudra (INA) | 54.881 | |

=== Quarterfinals ===
- Qualification: 1–2 → Semifinals (Q)

==== Heat 1 ====
| Rank | Athlete | Time | Notes |
|---|---|---|---|
| 1 | Shim Suk-hee (KOR) | 43.597 | Q |
| 2 | Guo Yihan (CHN) | 45.014 | Q |
| 3 | Anita Nagay (KAZ) | 47.129 | |
| — | Kim Ji-yoo (KOR) | PEN | |

==== Heat 2 ====
| Rank | Athlete | Time | Notes |
|---|---|---|---|
| 1 | Fan Kexin (CHN) | 43.580 | Q |
| 2 | Kim Iong-a (KAZ) | 44.891 | Q |
| 3 | Deanna Lockett (AUS) | 45.120 | |
| 4 | Anastassiya Krestova (KAZ) | 1:00.663 | |

==== Heat 3 ====
| Rank | Athlete | Time | Notes |
|---|---|---|---|
| 1 | Choi Min-jeong (KOR) | 44.300 | Q |
| 2 | Zang Yize (CHN) | 44.660 | Q |
| 3 | Cheyenne Goh (SGP) | 49.227 | |
| 4 | Moemi Kikuchi (JPN) | 1:08.747 | |

==== Heat 4 ====
| Rank | Athlete | Time | Notes |
|---|---|---|---|
| 1 | Sumire Kikuchi (JPN) | 44.453 | Q |
| 2 | Ayuko Ito (JPN) | 44.659 | Q |
| 3 | Lin Yu-tzu (TPE) | 47.380 | |
| 4 | Anja Chong (MAS) | 47.473 | |

=== Semifinals ===
- Qualification: 1–2 → Final A (QA), 3–4 → Final B (QB)

==== Heat 1 ====
| Rank | Athlete | Time | Notes |
|---|---|---|---|
| 1 | Fan Kexin (CHN) | 43.371 | QA |
| 2 | Ayuko Ito (JPN) | 43.433 | QA |
| 3 | Sumire Kikuchi (JPN) | 43.936 | QB |
| 4 | Kim Iong-a (KAZ) | 44.962 | QB |

==== Heat 2 ====
| Rank | Athlete | Time | Notes |
|---|---|---|---|
| 1 | Shim Suk-hee (KOR) | 43.587 | QA |
| 2 | Zang Yize (CHN) | 43.683 | QA |
| 3 | Guo Yihan (CHN) | 44.174 | QB |
| 4 | Choi Min-jeong (KOR) | 1:02.798 | QB |

=== Finals ===
==== Final B ====
| Rank | Athlete | Time |
|---|---|---|
| 3rd place, bronze medalist(s) | Choi Min-jeong (KOR) | 44.819 |
| 2 | Guo Yihan (CHN) | 44.881 |
| 3 | Kim Iong-a (KAZ) | 44.952 |
| 4 | Sumire Kikuchi (JPN) | 44.998 |

==== Final A ====
| Rank | Athlete | Time |
|---|---|---|
| 1st place, gold medalist(s) | Zang Yize (CHN) | 43.911 |
| 2nd place, silver medalist(s) | Ayuko Ito (JPN) | 44.236 |
| — | Fan Kexin (CHN) | PEN |
| — | Shim Suk-hee (KOR) | PEN |
