= Short-track speed skating at the 2017 Asian Winter Games – Women's 1000 metres =

Speed Skating Event in 2017

Women's 1000 metres at the 2017 Asian Winter Games
- Venue: Makomanai Ice Arena
- Dates: 22 February 2017
- Competitors: 26 from 12 nations

Medalists
gold medal	Shim Suk-hee	South Korea
silver medal	Choi Min-jeong	South Korea
bronze medal	Sumire Kikuchi	Japan

The women's 1000 metres at the 2017 Asian Winter Games was held on 22 February 2017 in Sapporo, Japan.

== Schedule ==
All times are Japan Standard Time (UTC+09:00)

Date	Time	Event
Wednesday, 22 February 2017	12:02	Heats
Wednesday, 22 February 2017	13:27	Quarterfinals
Wednesday, 22 February 2017	14:11	Semifinals
Wednesday, 22 February 2017	14:44	Finals

== Results ==
Legend

- PEN — Penalty

=== Heats ===
- Qualification: 1–2 + Two best 3 → Quarterfinals (Q + q)

==== Heat 1 ====
Rank	Athlete	Time	Notes
1	Guo Yihan (CHN)	1:46.797	Q
2	Noh Do-hee (KOR)	1:47.346	Q
3	Varsha S. Puranik (IND)	1:52.487	

==== Heat 2 ====
Rank	Athlete	Time	Notes
1	Choi Min-jeong (KOR)	1:38.542	Q
2	Lin Yu-tzu (TPE)	1:39.597	Q
3	Cheyenne Goh (SGP)	1:41.672	q

==== Heat 3 ====
Rank	Athlete	Time	Notes
1	Ayuko Ito (JPN)	1:57.638	Q
2	Zang Yize (CHN)	1:57.806	Q
3	Rahmah Osya Samudra (INA)	2:06.768	
4	Nor Marissa Alia (MAS)	2:07.488	

==== Heat 4 ====
Rank	Athlete	Time	Notes
1	Shim Suk-hee (KOR)	1:46.936	Q
2	Anja Chong (MAS)	1:48.243	Q
3	Lu Chia-tung (TPE)	1:48.417	
4	Alifia Meidia Namasta (INA)	2:00.369	

==== Heat 5 ====
Rank	Athlete	Time	Notes
1	Kim Iong-a (KAZ)	1:57.817	Q
2	Deanna Lockett (AUS)	1:57.826	Q
3	Ashley Chin (MAS)	2:00.641	
4	Wang Kuan-ming (TPE)	2:03.826	

==== Heat 6 ====
Rank	Athlete	Time	Notes
1	Sumire Kikuchi (JPN)	1:34.782	Q
2	Anastassiya Krestova (KAZ)	1:34.859	Q
3	Battulgyn Gereltuyaa (MGL)	2:02.806	
4	Kathryn Magno (PHI)	2:02.991	

==== Heat 7 ====
Rank	Athlete	Time	Notes
1	Hitomi Saito (JPN)	1:32.980	Q
2	Fan Kexin (CHN)	1:33.138	Q
3	Madina Zhanbussinova (KAZ)	1:33.474	q
4	Gita Widya Yunika (INA)	2:03.965	

=== Quarterfinals ===
- Qualification: 1–2 + Two best 3 → Semifinals (Q + q)

==== Heat 1 ====
Rank	Athlete	Time	Notes
1	Fan Kexin (CHN)	1:41.516	Q
2	Anastassiya Krestova (KAZ)	1:43.970	Q
3	Cheyenne Goh (SGP)	1:46.560	
—	Hitomi Saito (JPN)	PEN	

==== Heat 2 ====
Rank	Athlete	Time	Notes
1	Kim Iong-a (KAZ)	1:36.166	Q
2	Sumire Kikuchi (JPN)	1:36.256	Q
3	Madina Zhanbussinova (KAZ)	1:36.821	q
4	Lin Yu-tzu (TPE)	1:37.800	

==== Heat 3 ====
Rank	Athlete	Time	Notes
1	Choi Min-jeong (KOR)	1:34.971	Q
2	Noh Do-hee (KOR)	1:35.104	Q
3	Ayuko Ito (JPN)	1:37.655	
—	Deanna Lockett (AUS)	PEN	

==== Heat 4 ====
Rank	Athlete	Time	Notes
1	Shim Suk-hee (KOR)	1:32.971	Q
2	Guo Yihan (CHN)	1:33.074	Q
3	Zang Yize (CHN)	1:33.147	q
4	Anja Chong (MAS)	1:39.869	

=== Semifinals ===
- Qualification: 1–2 → Final A (QA), 3–4 → Final B (QB)

==== Heat 1 ====
Rank	Athlete	Time	Notes
1	Shim Suk-hee (KOR)	1:33.831	QA
2	Guo Yihan (CHN)	1:33.898	QA
3	Zang Yize (CHN)	1:34.320	QB
4	Noh Do-hee (KOR)	1:34.378	QB
5	Fan Kexin (CHN)	1:38.694	

==== Heat 2 ====
Rank	Athlete	Time	Notes
1	Choi Min-jeong (KOR)	1:30.800	QA
2	Sumire Kikuchi (JPN)	1:30.855	QA
3	Anastassiya Krestova (KAZ)	1:31.572	QB
4	Madina Zhanbussinova (KAZ)	1:31.629	QB
5	Kim Iong-a (KAZ)	1:32.251	

=== Finals ===
==== Final B ====
Rank	Athlete	Time
1	Noh Do-hee (KOR)	1:39.964
2	Zang Yize (CHN)	1:40.049
3	Anastassiya Krestova (KAZ)	1:40.333
4	Madina Zhanbussinova (KAZ)	1:41.035

==== Final A ====
Rank	Athlete	Time
1st place, gold medalist(s)	Shim Suk-hee (KOR)	1:30.376
2nd place, silver medalist(s)	Choi Min-jeong (KOR)	1:30.451
3rd place, bronze medalist(s)	Sumire Kikuchi (JPN)	1:30.544
4	Guo Yihan (CHN)	1:30.709
