= Short-track speed skating at the 2017 Asian Winter Games – Women's 1500 metres =

Women's 1500 metres at the 2017 Asian Winter Games
- Venue: Makomanai Ice Arena
- Dates: 20 February 2017
- Competitors: 22 from 11 nations

Medalists
gold medal	Choi Min-jeong	South Korea
silver medal	Shim Suk-hee	South Korea
bronze medal	Guo Yihan	China

The women's 1500 metres at the 2017 Asian Winter Games was held on February 20, 2017 in Sapporo, Japan.

== Schedule ==
All times are Japan Standard Time (UTC+09:00)

Date	Time	Event
Monday, 20 February 2017	13:02	Heats
Monday, 20 February 2017	14:27	Semifinals
Monday, 20 February 2017	15:15	Finals

== Results ==
Legend

- ADV — Advanced
- PEN — Penalty

=== Heats ===
- Qualification: 1–3 → Semifinals (Q)

==== Heat 1 ====
Rank	Athlete	Time	Notes
1	Guo Yihan (CHN)	2:41.170	Q
2	Deanna Lockett (AUS)	2:41.551	Q
3	Moemi Kikuchi (JPN)	2:41.804	Q
4	Madina Zhanbussinova (KAZ)	2:44.273	

==== Heat 2 ====
Rank	Athlete	Time	Notes
1	Kim Ji-yoo (KOR)	2:38.530	Q
2	Aoi Watanabe (JPN)	2:38.633	Q
3	Lin Yu-tzu (TPE)	2:49.161	Q
4	Gita Widya Yunika (INA)	No time	

==== Heat 3 ====
Rank	Athlete	Time	Notes
1	Shim Suk-hee (KOR)	2:59.175	Q
2	Olga Tikhonova (KAZ)	3:00.433	Q
3	Ashley Chin (MAS)	3:02.460	Q
4	Lu Chia-tung (TPE)	3:02.567	
5	Kathryn Magno (PHI)	3:16.372	

==== Heat 4 ====
Rank	Athlete	Time	Notes
1	Choi Min-jeong (KOR)	2:42.964	Q
2	Kim Iong-a (KAZ)	2:43.069	Q
3	Fan Kexin (CHN)	2:43.267	Q
4	Varsha S. Puranik (IND)	2:55.404	
5	Rahmah Osya Samudra (INA)	2:57.976	

==== Heat 5 ====
Rank	Athlete	Time	Notes
1	Hitomi Saito (JPN)	2:55.596	Q
2	Zang Yize (CHN)	2:55.734	Q
3	Cheyenne Goh (SGP)	3:00.201	Q
4	Yang Zih-shian (TPE)	3:07.801	

=== Semifinals ===
- Qualification: 1–2 → Final A (QA), 3–4 → Final B (QB)

==== Heat 1 ====
Rank	Athlete	Time	Notes
1	Kim Ji-yoo (KOR)	2:31.707	QA
2	Aoi Watanabe (JPN)	2:32.291	QA
3	Fan Kexin (CHN)	2:32.637	ADVA
4	Lin Yu-tzu (TPE)	2:37.724	QB
—	Deanna Lockett (AUS)	PEN	

==== Heat 2 ====
Rank	Athlete	Time	Notes
1	Shim Suk-hee (KOR)	2:36.964	QA
2	Guo Yihan (CHN)	2:37.089	QA
3	Moemi Kikuchi (JPN)	2:37.300	QB
4	Kim Iong-a (KAZ)	2:37.320	QB
5	Cheyenne Goh (SGP)	2:53.343	

==== Heat 3 ====
Rank	Athlete	Time	Notes
1	Choi Min-jeong (KOR)	2:49.032	QA
2	Zang Yize (CHN)	2:49.403	QA
3	Hitomi Saito (JPN)	2:49.923	QB
4	Olga Tikhonova (KAZ)	2:54.476	QB
5	Ashley Chin (MAS)	2:56.844	

=== Finals ===
==== Final B ====
Rank	Athlete	Time
1	Moemi Kikuchi (JPN)	2:47.561
2	Hitomi Saito (JPN)	2:47.674
3	Kim Iong-a (KAZ)	2:47.987
4	Olga Tikhonova (KAZ)	2:48.191
5	Lin Yu-tzu (TPE)	2:50.700

==== Final A ====
Rank	Athlete	Time
1st place, gold medalist(s)	Choi Min-jeong (KOR)	2:29.416
2nd place, silver medalist(s)	Shim Suk-hee (KOR)	2:29.569
3rd place, bronze medalist(s)	Guo Yihan (CHN)	2:30.017
4	Kim Ji-yoo (KOR)	2:30.098
5	Fan Kexin (CHN)	2:30.929
6	Aoi Watanabe (JPN)	2:30.956
7	Zang Yize (CHN)	2:33.718
