= Nepal at the Asian Games =

- IOC code: NEP
- NOC: Nepal Olympic Committee
- Medals Ranked 41st: Gold 0 Silver 3 Bronze 25 Total 28

Summer appearances
- 1951; 1954; 1958; 1962; 1966; 1970; 1974; 1978; 1982; 1986; 1990; 1994; 1998; 2002; 2006; 2010; 2014; 2018; 2022; 2026

Winter appearances
- 2003; 2007; 2011; 2017; 2025; 2029

Nepal first competed at the Asian Games in 1951. The country did not participate in 1958 and 1962 Asian Games, but has participated in every subsequent editions. Bidhan Lama won the first ever Asian Games medal for Nepal at the 1986 Asian Games, winning a bronze in taekwondo.

== Medal tables ==
=== Medals by Asian Games ===
Games	Rank	Gold	Silver	Bronze	Total
1951 Asian Games	—N/a	0	0	0	0
1958 Asian Games	—N/a	0	0	0	0
1966 Asian Games	—N/a	0	0	0	0
1970 Asian Games	—N/a	0	0	0	0
1974 Asian Games	—N/a	0	0	0	0
1978 Asian Games	—N/a	0	0	0	0
1982 Asian Games	—N/a	0	0	0	0
1986 Asian Games	20	0	0	8	8
1990 Asian Games	22	0	0	1	1
1994 Asian Games	29	0	0	2	2
1998 Asian Games	27	0	1	3	4
2002 Asian Games	32	0	0	3	3
2006 Asian Games	35	0	0	3	3
2010 Asian Games	35	0	0	1	1
2014 Asian Games	37	0	0	1	1
2018 Asian Games	33	0	1	0	1
2022 Asian Games	32	0	1	1	2
2026 Asian Games	36	0	0	2	2
Total		0	3	25	28
As of 3 October, 2026

=== Medals by sports ===
Sport	Gold	Silver	Bronze	Total
Boxing	0	0	6	6
Kabaddi	0	0	1	1
Karate	0	1	4	4
Paragliding	0	1	0	1
Taekwondo	0	1	13	14
Total	0	3	24	26
