= Snowboarding at the 2017 Asian Winter Games – Men's giant slalom =

Men's giant slalom at the 2017 Asian Winter Games
- Venue: Sapporo Teine
- Dates: 19 February 2017
- Competitors: 22 from 9 nations

Medalists
| gold medal | Lee Sang-ho | South Korea |
| silver medal | Choi Bo-gun | South Korea |
| bronze medal | Shinnosuke Kamino | Japan |

The men's snowboard giant slalom competition at the 2017 Asian Winter Games in Sapporo, Japan was held on 19 February 2017 at the Sapporo Teine.

== Schedule ==
All times are Japan Standard Time (UTC+09:00)

| Date | Time | Event |
|---|---|---|
| Sunday, 19 February 2017 | 10:20 | 1st run |
| Sunday, 19 February 2017 | 12:35 | 2nd run |

== Results ==
Legend

- DNF — Did not finish
- DSQ — Disqualified

| Rank | Athlete | 1st run | 2nd run | Total |
|---|---|---|---|---|
| 1st place, gold medalist(s) | Lee Sang-ho (KOR) | 51.94 | 43.82 | 1:35.76 |
| 2nd place, silver medalist(s) | Choi Bo-gun (KOR) | 52.02 | 44.42 | 1:36.44 |
| 3rd place, bronze medalist(s) | Shinnosuke Kamino (JPN) | 53.39 | 43.75 | 1:37.14 |
| 4 | Ji Myung-kon (KOR) | 52.27 | 45.24 | 1:37.51 |
| 5 | Kim Sang-kyum (KOR) | 53.13 | 45.02 | 1:38.15 |
| 6 | Bi Ye (CHN) | 53.33 | 45.10 | 1:38.43 |
| 7 | Zhang Xuan (CHN) | 53.64 | 45.12 | 1:38.76 |
| 8 | Yuya Suzuki (JPN) | 54.14 | 45.00 | 1:39.14 |
| 9 | Sun Huan (CHN) | 54.52 | 46.17 | 1:40.69 |
| 10 | Christian De Oliveira (AUS) | 55.61 | 46.12 | 1:41.73 |
| 11 | Ryan Espiritu (PHI) | 55.84 | 47.63 | 1:43.47 |
| 12 | Hossein Kalhor (IRI) | 56.41 | 47.44 | 1:43.85 |
| 13 | Hossein Kalhor (IRI) | 56.52 | 47.39 | 1:43.91 |
| 14 | Rollan Sadykov (KAZ) | 56.77 | 47.91 | 1:44.68 |
| 15 | Takumi Miyazawa (JPN) | 57.39 | 47.52 | 1:44.91 |
| 16 | Vladislav Zuyev (KAZ) | 59.95 | 49.37 | 1:49.32 |
| 17 | Nicholas Masjuk (AUS) | 1:02.51 | 50.02 | 1:52.53 |
| 18 | Avtar Singh (IND) | 1:13.59 | 1:04.00 | 2:17.59 |
| 19 | Nafez Tauk (LBN) | 1:16.38 | 1:04.13 | 2:20.51 |
| — | Hassan Kalhor (IRI) | 56.56 | DNF | DNF |
| — | Hossein Seid (IRI) | 57.59 | DSQ | DSQ |
| — | Wu Pengtao (CHN) | DSQ | | DSQ |
