= Figure skating at the 2017 Asian Winter Games – Women's singles =

Women's singles at the 2017 Asian Winter Games
- Venue: Makomanai Ice Arena
- Dates: 23–25 February 2017
- Competitors: 24 from 14 nations

Medalists
gold medal	Choi Da-bin	South Korea
silver medal	Li Zijun	China
bronze medal	Elizabet Tursynbayeva	Kazakhstan

The women's singles event at the 2017 Asian Winter Games was held on 23 and 25 February 2017 at the Makomanai Ice Arena in Sapporo, Japan.

== Schedule ==
All times are Japan Standard Time (UTC+09:00)

Date	Time	Event
Thursday, 23 February 2017	16:50	Short program
Saturday, 25 February 2017	17:00	Free skating

== Results ==
Rank	Athlete	SP	FS	Total
1st place, gold medalist(s)	Choi Da-bin (KOR)	61.30	126.24	187.54
2nd place, silver medalist(s)	Li Zijun (CHN)	58.65	116.95	175.60
3rd place, bronze medalist(s)	Elizabet Tursynbayeva (KAZ)	53.16	121.88	175.04
4	Rika Hongo (JPN)	60.98	100.39	161.37
5	Kailani Craine (AUS)	55.02	99.39	154.41
6	Yu Shuran (SGP)	50.99	95.71	146.70
7	Zhao Ziquan (CHN)	58.90	79.67	138.57
8	Aiza Mambekova (KAZ)	49.99	82.65	132.64
9	Amy Lin (TPE)	47.15	83.88	131.03
10	Maisy Ma (HKG)	47.81	79.58	127.39
11	Chloe Ing (SGP)	44.64	82.71	127.35
12	Joanna So (HKG)	41.65	68.72	110.37
13	Kim Na-hyun (KOR)	40.80	67.97	108.77
14	Promsan Rattanadilok (THA)	25.71	62.84	88.55
15	Samantha Cabiles (PHI)	28.54	55.11	83.65
16	Aina Sorfina Aminudin (MAS)	25.16	57.19	82.35
17	Thita Lamsam (THA)	26.89	53.12	80.01
18	Zahra Lari (UAE)	23.31	53.37	76.68
19	Shayanne Casapao (PHI)	24.33	46.66	70.99
20	Tasya Putri (INA)	22.21	48.01	70.22
21	Aleksandra Nesterova (KGZ)	21.69	48.46	70.15
22	Aneeta Lingam (MAS)	18.67	44.15	62.82
23	Laura Ismagulova (KGZ)	18.53	42.44	60.97
24	Nurul Ayinie Sulaeman (INA)	16.81	30.88	47.69
