= Figure skating at the 2017 Asian Winter Games =

- Venue: Makomanai Ice Arena
- Dates: 23–26 February 2017
- Competitors: 75 from 17 nations

Figure skating at the 2017 Asian Winter Games was held in Sapporo, Japan between 23 and 26 February at the Makomanai Ice Arena. A total of four events were contested: men's and women's singles, pairs and ice dancing.

China finished first in medal table, winning two gold medals.

== Schedule ==
S	Short program	F	Free skating

Event↓/Date →	23rd Thu	24th Fri	25th Sat	26th Sun
Men's singles		S		F
Women's singles	S		F	
Pairs		S	F	
Ice dance	S	F		

== Medalists ==
Event	Gold	Silver	Bronze
Men's singles	Shoma Uno; Japan	Jin Boyang; China	Yan Han; China
Women's singles	Choi Da-bin; South Korea	Li Zijun; China	Elizabet Tursynbayeva; Kazakhstan
Pairs	China; Zhang Hao; Yu Xiaoyu	China; Jin Yang; Peng Cheng	North Korea; Kim Ju-sik; Ryom Tae-ok
Ice dance	China; Liu Xinyu; Wang Shiyue	Japan; Chris Reed; Kana Muramoto	China; Zhao Yan; Chen Hong

== Medal table ==
Rank	Nation	Gold	Silver	Bronze	Total
1	China (CHN)	2	3	2	7
2	Japan (JPN)	1	1	0	2
3	South Korea (KOR)	1	0	0	1
4	Kazakhstan (KAZ)	0	0	1	1
4	North Korea (PRK)	0	0	1	1
Totals (5 entries)		4	4	4	12

== Participating nations ==
A total of 75 athletes from 17 nations competed in figure skating at the 2017 Asian Winter Games:

- Australia (6)
- China (12)
- Chinese Taipei (3)
- Hong Kong (4)
- India (3)
- Indonesia (4)
- Japan (11)
- Kazakhstan (4)
- Kyrgyzstan (2)
- Malaysia (4)
- North Korea (2)
- Philippines (4)
- Singapore (2)
- South Korea (10)
- Thailand (2)
- United Arab Emirates (1)
- Uzbekistan (1)

* Australia as guest nation, was ineligible to win any medals.
