= 2017 Asian Winter Games Parade of Nations =

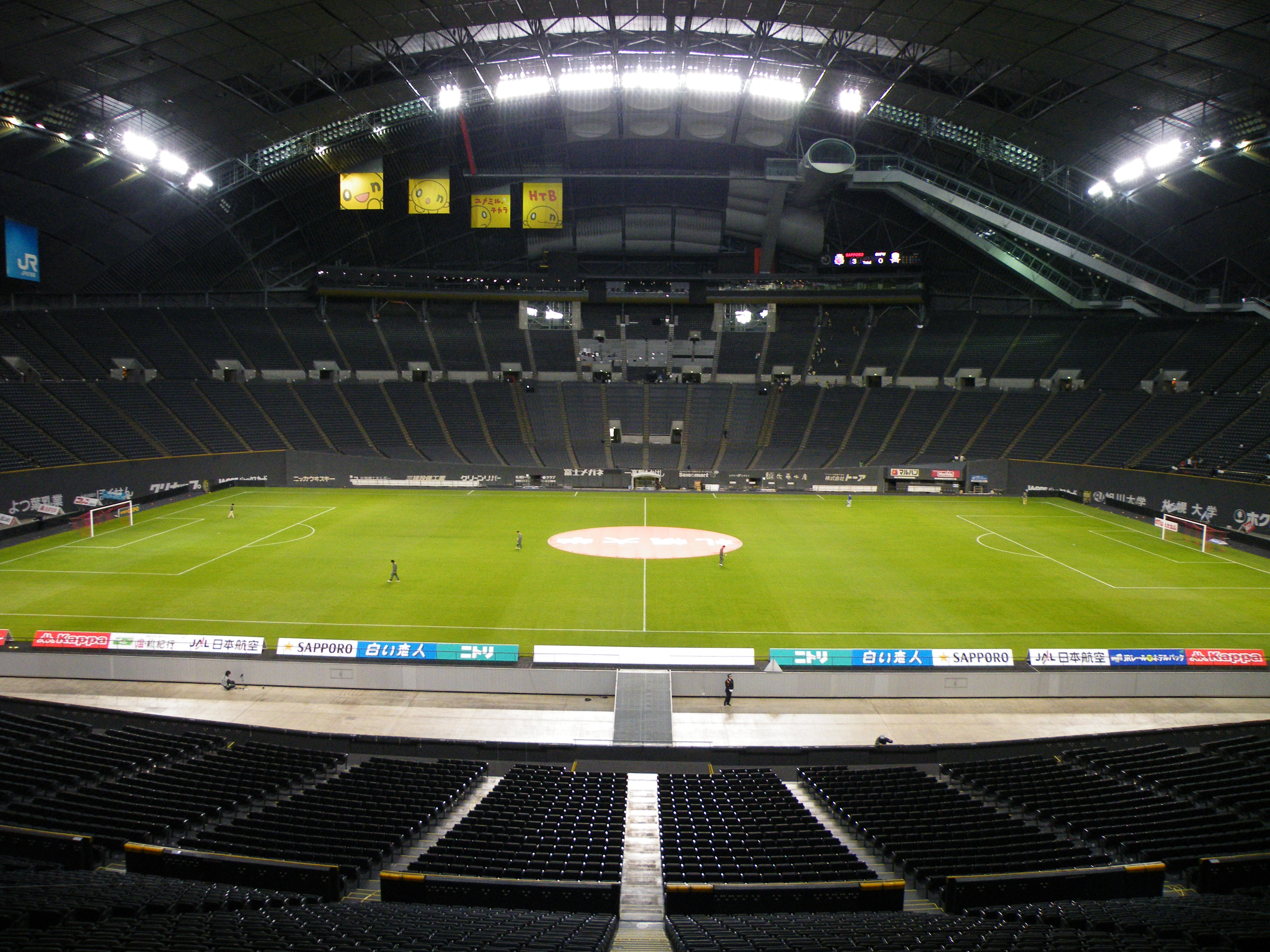
The Sapporo Dome hosted the opening ceremony.

During the Parade of Nations at the 2017 Asian Winter Games opening ceremony, held on 19 February 2017, 30 athletes bearing the flags of their respective nations led their national delegations as they paraded into the Sapporo Dome in the host city of Sapporo, Japan.

== Countries and flagbearers ==
Athletes entered the stadium in English alphabetical order. However, Kuwaiti athletes entered after the alphabetically last team (Vietnam) as Independent Olympic Athletes due to the suspension of the Kuwait Olympic Committee. They were followed by guest invitees Australia and New Zealand, with the Japanese team entering last as the host nation.

The names of the nations were announced first in Japanese and then English. While the placards displayed only English, a screen in the stadium displayed both Japanese and English.

Below is a list of parading countries and their announced flag bearer, in the same order as the parade. This is sortable by country name, flag bearer's name, or flag bearer's sport.

Order	Nation	Japanese	Roman transliteration	Flag bearer	Sport
1	China (CHN) (People's Republic of China)	中華人民共和国	Chūka jinmin kyōwakoku	Wu Dajing	Short track speed skating
2	North Korea (PRK) (Democratic People's Republic of Korea)	朝鮮民主主義人民共和国	Chōsen minshushugi jinmin kyōwakoku	Kim Pyol-song	Short track speed skating
3	Hong Kong (HKG) (Hong Kong, China)	ホンコン・チャイナ	Honkon chaina	Tony Leung	Ice hockey
4	India (IND)	インド	Indo		
5	Indonesia (INA)	インドネシア	Indoneshia	Jonathan Sudharta	Ice hockey
6	Iran (IRI) (Islamic Republic of Iran)	イラン・イスラム共和国	Iran Isuramu kyōwakoku	Hossein Saveh-Shemshaki	Alpine skiing
7	Jordan (JOR)	ヨルダン	Yorudan	Nasser Majali	Jordan Olympic Committee Secretary General
8	Kazakhstan (KAZ)	カザフスタン	Kazafusutan	Yerdos Akhmadiyev	Cross-country skiing
9	South Korea (KOR) (Republic of Korea)	大韓民国	Daikanminkoku	Jung Dong-hyun	Alpine skiing
10	Kyrgyzstan (KGZ)	キルギス	Kirugisu	Elzar Bolotbekov	Ice hockey
11	Lebanon (LBN)	レバノン	Rebanon	Samer Tawk	Cross-country skiing
12	Macau (MAC) (Macau, China)	マカオ・チャイナ	Makao chaina	U Chi Fong	Ice hockey
13	Malaysia (MAS)	マレーシア	Marēshia	Reezman Bin Isa	Ice hockey
14	Mongolia (MGL)	モンゴル	Mongoru	Erdenechimeg Barkhuu	Biathlon
15	Nepal (NEP)	ネパール	Nepāru	Saphal-Ram Shrestha	Alpine skiing
16	Pakistan (PAK)	パキスタン	Pakisutan		
17	Philippines (PHI)	フィリピン	Firipin	Carlo Garrucho	Ice hockey
18	Qatar (QAT)	カタール	Katāru	Thamer Al Mohannadi	Ice hockey
19	Singapore (SGP)	シンガポール	Shingapōru	Lucas Ng	Short track speed skating
20	Sri Lanka (SRI)	スリランカ	Suriranka	Lukas Hettiarachchi	Cross-country skiing
21	Chinese Taipei (TPE)	チャイニーズ・タイペイ	Chainīzu Taipei	Shen Yen-chin	Ice hockey
22	Tajikistan (TJK)	タジキスタン	Tajikisutan		
23	Thailand (THA)	タイ	Tai	Thita Lamsam	Figure skating
24	Timor-Leste (TLS) (Democratic Republic of Timor-Leste)	東ティモール民主共和国	Higashi timōru minshu kyōwakoku	Yohan Goutt Gonçalves	Alpine skiing
25	Turkmenistan (TKM)	トルクメニスタン	Torukumenisutan		
26	United Arab Emirates (UAE)	アラブ首長国連邦	Arabu shuchōkoku renpō		
27	Uzbekistan (UZB)	ウズベキスタン	Uzubekisutan	Kamila Yuldasheva	Official
28	Vietnam (VIE)	ベトナム	Betonamu	Nguyen Duc Manh	Cross-country skiing
29	Independent Olympic Athletes (IOA)	個人資格参加選手団	Kojin shikaku sanka senshu dan		
30	Australia (AUS) (Guest Australia)	ゲスト参加 オーストラリア	Gesuto sanka Ōsutoraria	Deanna Lockett	Short track speed skating
31	New Zealand (NZL) (Guest New Zealand)	ゲスト参加 ニュージーランド	Gesuto sanka Nyūjīrando	Jarden Christopher Edward	Short track speed skating
32	Japan (JPN)	日本	Nihon	Go Tanaka	Ice hockey

- Australia and New Zealand's placards read simply "Australia" and "New Zealand", but were announced and displayed on the stadium's screen as "Guest Australia" and "Guest New Zealand".
