= Figure skating at the 2017 Asian Winter Games – Ice dance =

Ice dance at the 2017 Asian Winter Games
- Venue: Makomanai Ice Arena
- Dates: 23–24 February 2017
- Competitors: 14 from 5 nations

Medalists
gold medal	Liu Xinyu; Wang Shiyue	China
silver medal	Chris Reed; Kana Muramoto	Japan
bronze medal	Zhao Yan; Chen Hong	China

The ice dancing event at the 2017 Asian Winter Games was held on 23 and 24 February 2017 at the Makomanai Ice Arena in Sapporo, Japan.

== Schedule ==
All times are Japan Standard Time (UTC+09:00)

Date	Time	Event
Thursday, 23 February 2017	15:10	Short dance
Friday, 24 February 2017	16:05	Free dance

== Results ==
Rank	Team	SD	FD	Total
1st place, gold medalist(s)	China (CHN); Liu Xinyu; Wang Shiyue	66.02	98.26	164.28
2nd place, silver medalist(s)	Japan (JPN); Chris Reed; Kana Muramoto	64.74	94.40	159.14
3rd place, bronze medalist(s)	China (CHN); Zhao Yan; Chen Hong	59.02	83.40	142.42
4	South Korea (KOR); Richard Kam; Lee Ho-jung	51.56	79.66	131.22
5	Japan (JPN); Kentaro Suzuki; Ibuki Mori	48.84	75.28	124.12
6	Australia (AUS); William Badaoui; Matilda Friend	42.56	63.42	105.98
7	India (IND); Anup Kumar Yama; Aldrin Mathew	10.18	21.10	31.28
