= Choi Min-jeong =

South Korean speed skater (born 1998)

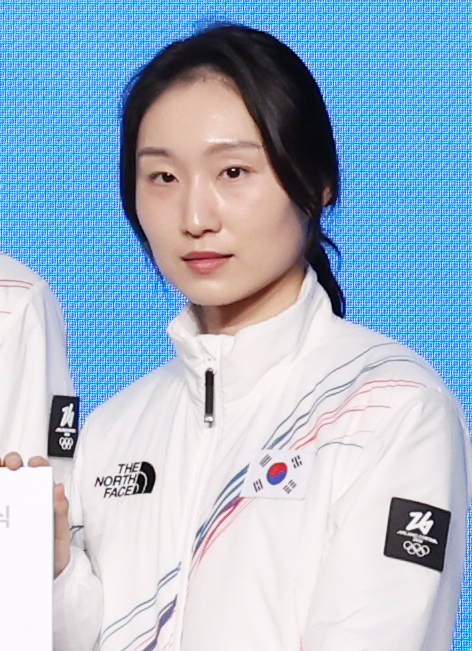
- Choi in 2026

Personal information
- Nationality: South Korean
- Born: 9 September 1998 (age 28) Seongnam, South Korea
- Height: 1.63 m (5 ft 4 in)
- Weight: 54 kg (119 lb)

Korean name
- Hangul: 최민정
- Hanja: 崔珉禎
- RR: Choe Minjeong
- MR: Ch'oe Minjŏng

Sport
- Country: South Korea
- Sport: Short track speed skating
- Club: Seongnam City Hall

Achievements and titles
- Personal bests: 500m: 41.955 (2026); 1000m: 1:26:850 (2022); 1500m: 2:14:354 WR (2016); 3000m: 4:58:939 (2018)
Medal record
Women's short track speed skating
Representing South Korea
Event	1st	2nd	3rd
Olympic Games	4	3	0
World Championships	17	6	1
Asian Games	5	1	1
World Junior Championships	2	1	1
Total	28	11	3
Olympic Games
Gold medal – first place	2018 Pyeongchang	1500 m
Gold medal – first place	2018 Pyeongchang	3000 m relay
Gold medal – first place	2022 Beijing	1500 m
Gold medal – first place	2026 Milano Cortina	3000 m relay
Silver medal – second place	2022 Beijing	1000 m
Silver medal – second place	2022 Beijing	3000 m relay
Silver medal – second place	2026 Milano Cortina	1500 m
World Championships
Gold medal – first place	2015 Moscow	Overall
Gold medal – first place	2015 Moscow	1000 m
Gold medal – first place	2015 Moscow	3000 m relay
Gold medal – first place	2016 Seoul	Overall
Gold medal – first place	2016 Seoul	1000 m
Gold medal – first place	2016 Seoul	3000 m relay
Gold medal – first place	2018 Montreal	Overall
Gold medal – first place	2018 Montreal	500 m
Gold medal – first place	2018 Montreal	1500 m
Gold medal – first place	2018 Montreal	3000 m relay
Gold medal – first place	2019 Sofia	1500 m
Gold medal – first place	2019 Sofia	3000 m relay
Gold medal – first place	2022 Montreal	Overall
Gold medal – first place	2022 Montreal	1000 m
Gold medal – first place	2022 Montreal	1500 m
Gold medal – first place	2022 Montreal	3000 m relay
Gold medal – first place	2025 Beijing	1500 m
Silver medal – second place	2016 Seoul	1500 m
Silver medal – second place	2019 Sofia	Overall
Silver medal – second place	2019 Sofia	1000 m
Silver medal – second place	2023 Seoul	1000 m
Silver medal – second place	2023 Seoul	1500 m
Silver medal – second place	2023 Seoul	3000 m relay
Bronze medal – third place	2015 Moscow	1500 m
Asian Games
Gold medal – first place	2017 Sapporo	1500 m
Gold medal – first place	2017 Sapporo	3000 m relay
Gold medal – first place	2025 Harbin	500 m
Gold medal – first place	2025 Harbin	1000 m
Gold medal – first place	2025 Harbin	2000 m mixed relay
Silver medal – second place	2017 Sapporo	1000 m
Bronze medal – third place	2017 Sapporo	500 m
Winter World University Games
Gold medal – first place	2023 Lake Placid	500 m
Gold medal – first place	2023 Lake Placid	1000 m
Gold medal – first place	2023 Lake Placid	1500 m
Gold medal – first place	2023 Lake Placid	3000 m relay
World Junior Championships
Gold medal – first place	2014 Erzurum	1000 m
Gold medal – first place	2014 Erzurum	3000 m relay
Silver medal – second place	2014 Erzurum	1500 m
Bronze medal – third place	2014 Erzurum	Overall

Choi Min-jeong (Korean: 최민정; born 9 September 1998) is a South Korean short track speed skater. She is a four-time Olympic Champion (2018, 2022, 2026), a four-time World Champion (2015, 2016, 2018, 2022), Four Continents Champion (2020), and the current world record holder for 1500m. Choi is widely regarded as the best female Korean short track speed skater of all time. With four golds, three silvers (seven medals in total), she is South Korea's most decorated Olympian across both Summer and Winter Olympic Games.

== Career ==
=== Junior career ===
Choi won third overall behind teammates Noh Do-hee and Ahn Se-jung after winning 1000m gold and 1500m silver at the 2014 World Junior Championships.

=== Senior career ===
During the 2014–15 season at the senior level, Choi won her first World Cup gold medal ahead of Arianna Fontana and Shim Suk-hee in Montréal. At just 16 years old, she took her first World title at the 2015 World Championships in Moscow after winning gold in 1000m and 3000m. A year later, she successfully defended her title in Seoul. During the 2016–17 season, Choi set a new world record time of 2:14:354 in 1500m in Salt Lake City.

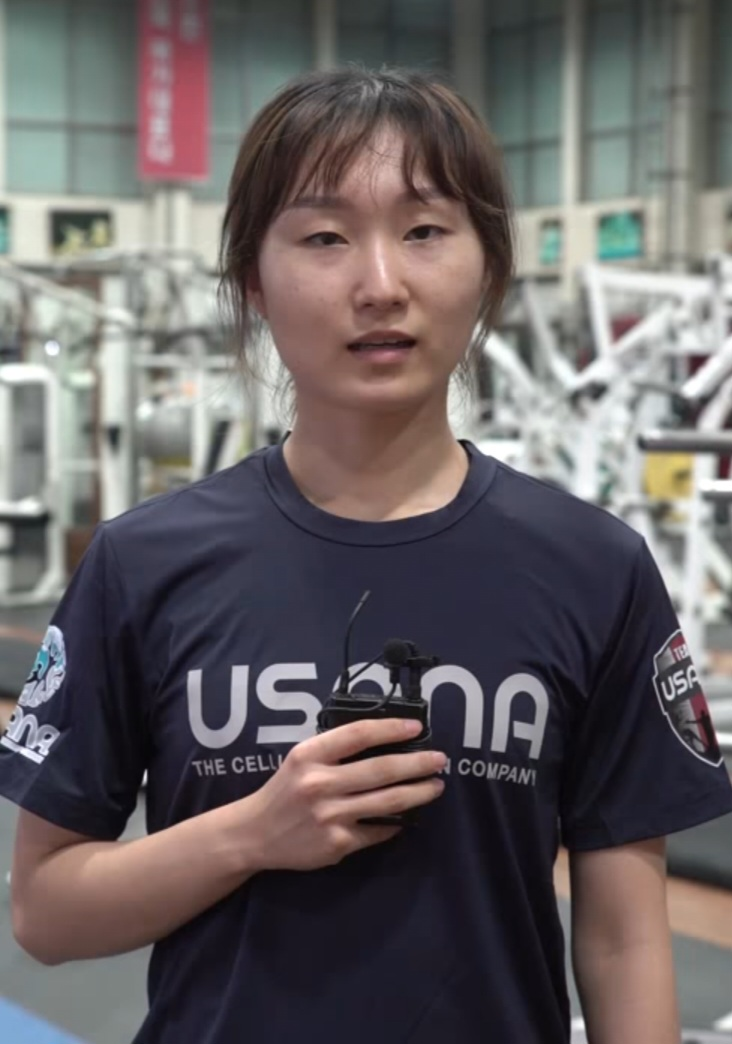
Choi in 2018

In 2018, at the PyeongChang Winter Olympics, Choi became a two-time Olympic Champion after winning gold in the 1500m and 3000m relay. She set and currently holds the Olympic record in the 500m after breaking the previous Olympic record set by Elise Christie by 0.45 seconds. Choi was one of the big favourites heading to the A final, but she was penalized for interference having finished second. Choi went on to win the 1500m gold and led her team to the 3000m relay gold by more than eight seconds. She crashed and finished fourth after colliding with Shim Suk-hee in the 1000m finals.

Choi won her third overall World title at the 2018 World Championships, collecting 110 points overall after winning gold in the 500m, 1500m, and 3000m Superfinal.

At the inaugural 2020 Four Continents Championships, Choi had a clean sweep after winning gold medals in every distance. She was crowned the first-ever Four Continents overall champion after finishing first overall ahead of teammate Seo Whi-min and Courtney Sarault by a staggering margin of 89 and 92 points, respectively. The 2020 World Championships in Seoul was cancelled due to the COVID-19 pandemic and Choi withdrew from the 2021 World Championships due to the pandemic.

During the 2021–22 season, she suffered knee and ankle injuries in separate collisions during the October World Cup opener in Beijing. She was unable to compete in at the following World Cup event in Nagoya due to her injuries. Choi also had to deal with off-ice issues when the leaked text messages from her longtime teammate Shim implied that Shim tripped her on purpose during the match.

Choi competed for Korea at the 2022 Beijing Winter Olympic Games, winning gold in the 1500m, setting a new Olympic record in the quarterfinal. She also won two silver medals in the 1000m and women's 3000m relay.

Choi was crowned the world short track speed skating champion at the 2022 World Championships after winning gold in the 1000m, 1500m, and 3000m Superfinals. This is her first world title in four years (vice world champion in 2019, world championships cancelled in 2020, withdrew in 2021) and her fourth overall world title. She also anchored Team Korea in the women's 3000m relay from the bronze medal position to gold in the final curve of the relay with an incredible move, finishing 0.034 seconds ahead of Team Canada.

== Personal life ==
Choi took up skating as a hobby at the age of six and joined a local club to pursue skating further. Her role model is Jin Sun-yu. She is enrolled at Yonsei University.

== Philanthropy ==
On 7 March 2022, Choi donated 50 million won to the Hope Bridge Disaster Relief Association to help the victims of the massive wildfire that started in Uljin, Gyeongbuk, and has spread to Samcheok, Gangwon.

== Awards and nominations ==
Name of the award ceremony, year presented, category, nominee of the award, and the result of the nomination
Award ceremony	Year	Category	Nominee / Work	Result	Ref.
National Brand Awards	2022	National Brand Awards in Sports	Choi Min-jeong	Won	
