= Shim Suk-hee =

South Korean speed skater (born 1997)

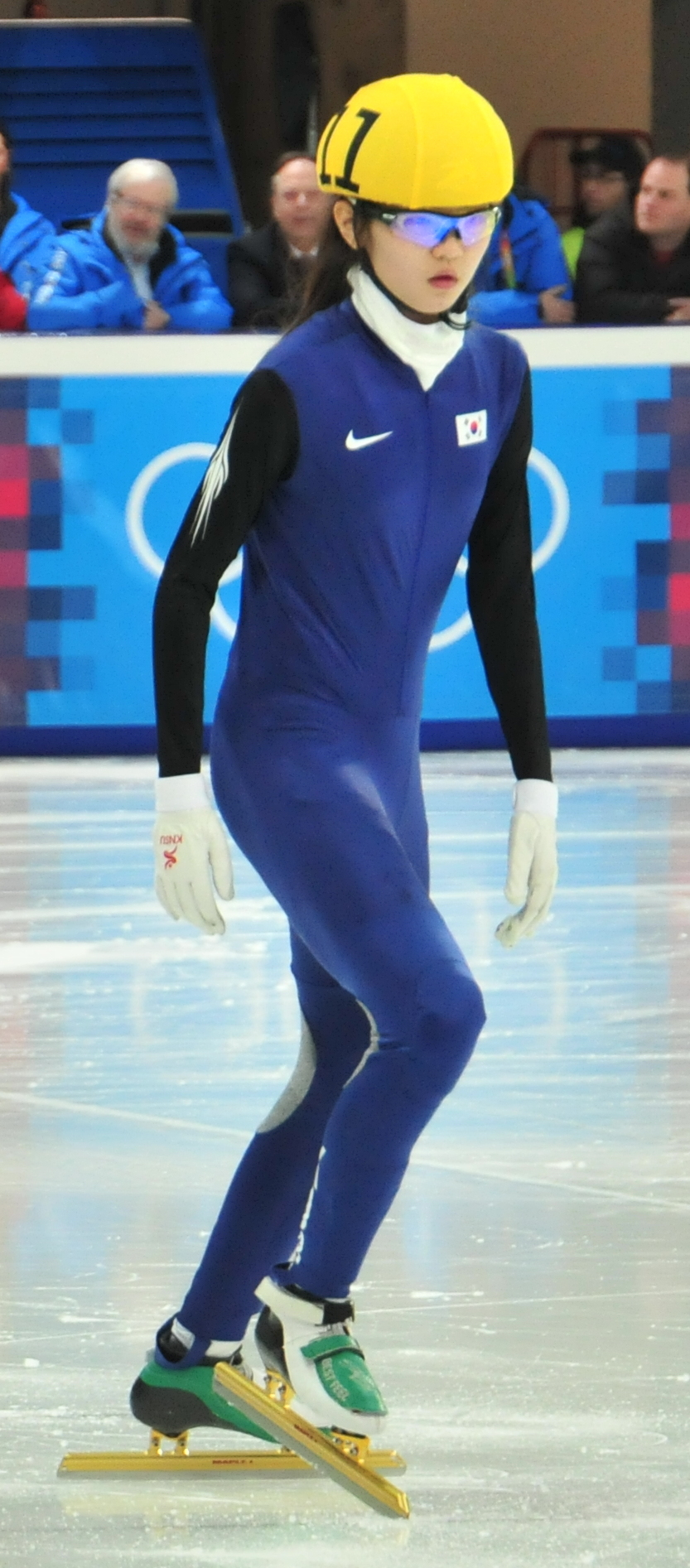
- Shim Suk-hee at the 2012 Youth Olympic Games

Personal information
- Nationality: South Korean
- Born: 30 January 1997 (age 29) Gangneung, South Korea
- Height: 1.75 m (5 ft 9 in)
- Weight: 56 kg (123 lb)

Sport
- Country: South Korea
- Sport: Short track speed skating
- Club: Seoul City Hall

Achievements and titles
- Personal bests: 500m: 42.440 (2022); 1000m: 1:26:661 (2012); 1500m: 2:17:513 (2012); 3000m: 4:50:829 (2014)
Medal record
Women's short track speed skating
Representing South Korea
Event	1st	2nd	3rd
Olympic Games	3	1	1
World Championships	9	5	4
Asian Games	2	1	0
Youth Olympic Games	2	0	1
World Junior Championships	5	0	1
Total	21	7	7
Olympic Games
Gold medal – first place	2014 Sochi	3000 m relay
Gold medal – first place	2018 Pyeongchang	3000 m relay
Gold medal – first place	2026 Milano Cortina	3000 m relay
Silver medal – second place	2014 Sochi	1500 m
Bronze medal – third place	2014 Sochi	1000 m
World Championships
Gold medal – first place	2014 Montreal	Overall
Gold medal – first place	2014 Montreal	1000 m
Gold medal – first place	2014 Montreal	1500 m
Gold medal – first place	2015 Moscow	3000 m relay
Gold medal – first place	2016 Seoul	3000 m relay
Gold medal – first place	2018 Montreal	1000 m
Gold medal – first place	2018 Montreal	3000 m relay
Gold medal – first place	2019 Sofia	3000 m relay
Gold medal – first place	2022 Montreal	3000 m relay
Silver medal – second place	2013 Debrecen	1500 m
Silver medal – second place	2015 Moscow	1500 m
Silver medal – second place	2018 Montreal	Overall
Silver medal – second place	2018 Montreal	1500 m
Silver medal – second place	2023 Seoul	3000 m relay
Bronze medal – third place	2013 Debrecen	Overall
Bronze medal – third place	2015 Moscow	Overall
Bronze medal – third place	2017 Rotterdam	Overall
Bronze medal – third place	2017 Rotterdam	1500 m
Asian Games
Gold medal – first place	2017 Sapporo	1000 m
Gold medal – first place	2017 Sapporo	3000 m relay
Gold medal – first place	2025 Harbin	2000 m mixed relay
Silver medal – second place	2017 Sapporo	1500 m
World Junior Championships
Gold medal – first place	2012 Melbourne	3000 m relay
Gold medal – first place	2012 Melbourne	Overall
Gold medal – first place	2012 Melbourne	500 m
Gold medal – first place	2012 Melbourne	1000 m
Gold medal – first place	2012 Melbourne	1500 m
Youth Olympic Games
Gold medal – first place	2012 Innsbruck	500 m
Gold medal – first place	2012 Innsbruck	1000 m
Representing Mixed-NOCs
Youth Olympic Games
Bronze medal – third place	2012 Innsbruck	Mixed team relay

- Shim Suk-hee
- Hangul: 심석희
- RR: Sim Seokhui
- MR: Sim Sŏkhŭi

Shim Suk-hee (Korean: 심석희; Korean pronunciation: [ɕim.sʌ.kʰi]; born 30 January 1997) is a South Korean short track speed skater. She is a three-time Olympic Champion (2014, 2018, 2026) in the 3000 m relay and a World Champion (2014).

== Early life ==
At the age of 6, Shim started short track speed skating in her hometown Gangneung as a hobby with her older brother's influence. Her talent was obvious from her time since elementary school and led Shim's parents to fully support her short track career. Shim spent rest of her elementary school years in Seoul and joined the Junior National Team upon entering middle school.

== Career ==
=== Junior career ===
Shim's first major international competition was the 2011 World Junior Championships. Her breakout moment was at the inaugural 2012 Winter Youth Olympics in Innsbruck, where she won gold in 500m and 1000m. She also won a bronze medal in the 3000m mixed-country/gender relay as a member of the mixed team made up of skaters representing different nations.

Shim continued her success at the 2012 World Junior Championships in Melbourne, where she finished first overall after winning gold in 500m, 1000m, and 1500m Superfinal. She also won gold in the relay with her teammates. In the 1000m semi-finals, Shim broke the world junior record previously set by Byun Chun-sa of South Korea in 2003, only to set a new world record in the 1000m finals.

=== Senior career ===
==== 2012–2013 Season ====
At the young age of 15, Shim was selected as a member of the South Korean national team. She made her World Cup debut and won her first World Cup medal during the 2012–2013 season in Calgary. At the following World Cup competition in Salt Lake City, Shim set a new 1000m world record with a time of 1:26:661, which was almost a second faster than the previous world record (1:27.653) set by Valérie Maltais two days ago. Her world record still stands to this day. Shim continued her successful World Cup run for the rest of the 2012–2013 season and finished first in the overall World Cup standings.

Shim competed at the 2013 World Championships, where she won the 3000m Superfinal. She finished third overall behind Wang Meng and Park Seung-hi after winning 1500m silver.

==== 2013–2014 Season ====
At the first race of the 2013–2014 World Cup in Shanghai, Shim won both the 1000 metres and 1500 metres. Shim won gold in the 1000 metres and silver in the 1500 metres at the second race in Seoul, South Korea. Her wins on home soil began to garner considerable media attention and put her into the national spotlight. At the third race of the 2013–2014 World Cup in Turin, Shim won both the 1000 metres and 1500 metres again. After winning gold in the 1500 metres and bronze in the 500 metres at the last race in Kolomna, Shim clinched her second straight overall World Cup title. She ended the competition with 102 overall points, followed by Park Seung-Hi and Valerie Maltais, with 73 and 39 points, respectively. She also became the 1000 meters and 1500 meters champion for the 2013–14 World Cup season. By this time, Shim has added a gold medal at twelve consecutive World Cups since 2012.

From 14–16 March 2014, Shim competed at the 2014 World Championships held in Montreal, Quebec, Canada, winning her first overall title with 102 points, placing first place in the 1000 metres, 1500 metres and 3000 metres. She defeated South Korean Park Seung-hi, silver medalist and Canadian Valérie Maltais who finished third in points. Park Seung-hi won the 500m and placed second in 1000m. Maltais placed second on 3000m relay and third in 1000m.

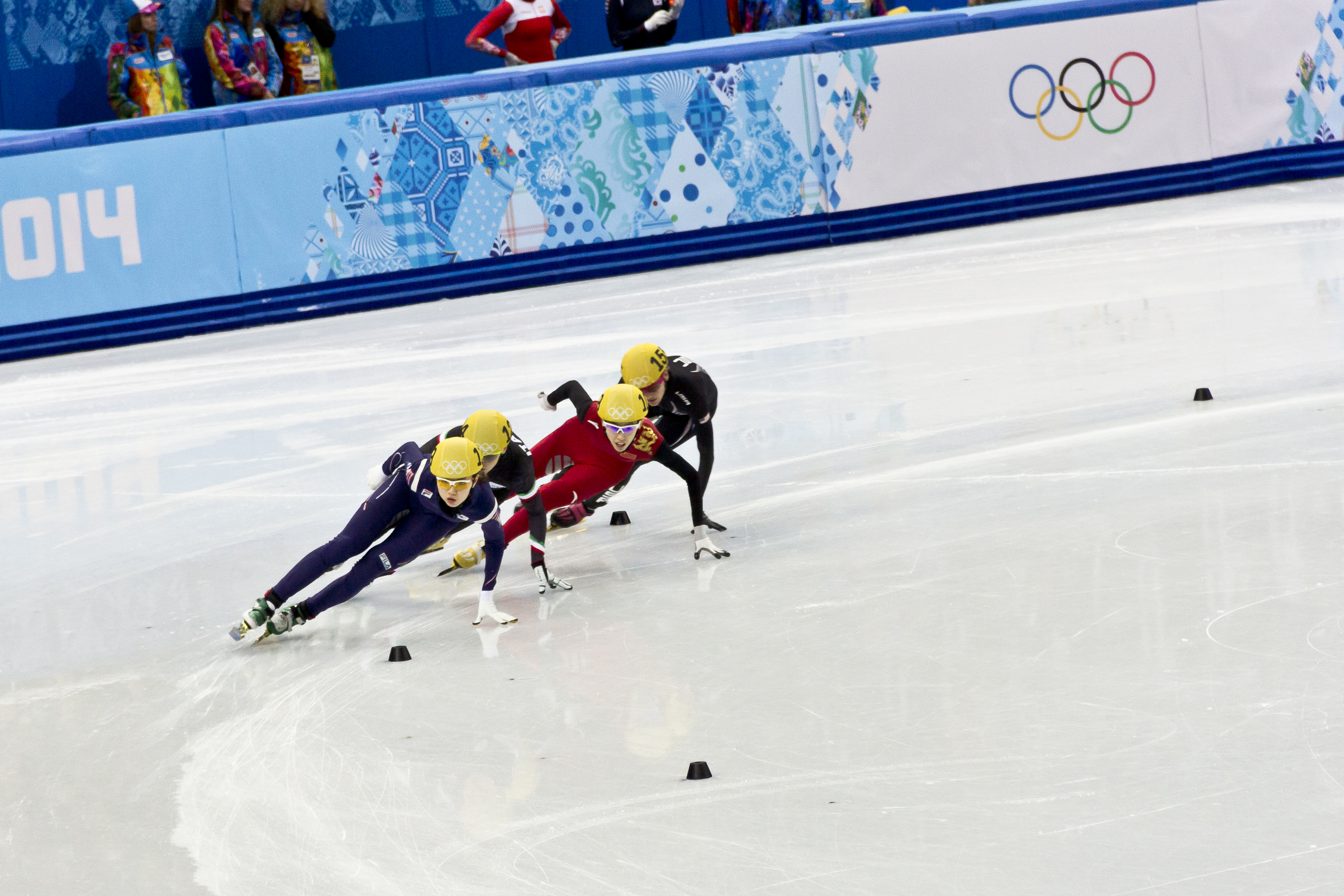
Shim Suk-hee in the 1000 m at the 2014 Winter Olympics

Shim went into her first Winter Olympics in Sochi with the declared aim of winning multiple gold medals. On 13 February 2014, she first competed in the 500 metres but surprisingly failed to advance out of the quarterfinals placing fourth in her heat. Experts believed her lack of experience under such pressure has hindered Shim from performing at her best.

Two days later, Shim won silver in the 1500 metres. Shim started the 1500 m final race at the back of the pack. Then she first made a move with 10 laps to go, charging out to first place with Arianna Fontana right behind her. After Kim A-lang and Li Jianrou got tangled up midway through, Shim was comfortably in the lead. Shim stayed in first place until the final stretch, but Zhou Yang, the reigning Olympic 1500 m champion, zipped past Shim with two laps to go and did not relinquish the lead.

On 18 February, Shim claimed gold in the 3000 metre relay as part of the South Korean relay team. With three laps to go in the final race, South Korea trailed China by a substantial margin and seemed headed toward an inevitable second place. However, the 17-year-old zipped past Li Jianrou on the outer side of the track in the final lap.

On 21 February, Shim won the bronze medal in the 1000 metres with a total time of 1:31.027, which was 0.266 seconds behind winner Park Seung-hi and 0.216 seconds behind runner-up Fan Kexin.

From 14–16 March 2014, Shim competed at the 2014 World Championships held in Montreal, Quebec, Canada, winning her first overall title with 102 points, placing first place in the 1000 metres, 1500 metres and 3000 metres. She defeated South Korean Park Seung-hi, silver medalist and Canadian Valérie Maltais who finished third in points.

==== 2014–2018 Seasons ====
She participated in the 2015 World Championships and the 3,000-meter relay, the 1500 meter and the 3000 meter super final. She won the gold medal in the 3,000-meter relay with Choi Min Jeong, Lee Eun Byul and Oh Do Hee. She won silver medals in the 1,500-meter and 3,000-meter super finals. She only competed in the 3,000-meter relay of the World Championships in 2016 and won the gold medal. She participated in the 3000m Super Final, 1500m, and won gold and bronze medals in 2017. She won the gold medal in the 3,000-meter relay, the 1,000-meter, and the silver medal in the 1,500-meter race in 2018. In her 2018 ISU competition, she was ranked second overall, after Choi Min Jeong. Shim placed first in 1500m, followed by Prosvironova Sofia and Li Jinyu, from Russia and China respectively. The relay team had Choi Min Jeong, Kim Alang, Kim Yejin and Shim Suk Hee. Shim won gold in 3000m relay with her teammates at the 2018 Winter Olympics.

=== 2020 ===
After going through several injuries and stepping down from national team, Shim Suk-hee has joined Seoul City as a non-national team member and plans to participate in upcoming national team trials that is planned to take place in April.

==== South Korea Winter competition ====
Shim Suk-hee participated in 2020 South Korea's Winter Competition, where her last participation was eight years ago, in 2012. Shim has won both 1500m and 1000m in February.

== Controversy ==
In January 2019, Shim revealed that she was sexually abused by former coach Cho Jae-beom, as a teenager. Following this, a group of athletes in South Korea raised allegations of additional instances of sexual abuse in South Korea's female speed skating scene. These allegations form part of a wider MeToo movement in South Korean elite sports. In her complaint filed in December 2018, Shim accused Cho of multiple sexual assaults, including rapes, that first happened when she was a high school student. She described how the sexual abuse by Cho continued until about two months before the Pyeongchang Winter Olympics that took in place in February 2018. The allegations surfaced in early 2018, when Shim left the national team to avoid further abuse. In her hearings in Seoul, Korea, she argued that Cho's violence kept "escalating" as time went by. In addition to sexual assault, Shim lays out that Cho kicked and punched her in the head as well. According to her lawyer, Shim did not come forward earlier because she was worried and felt pressure from Cho regarding her career. In an interview, a female athlete from South Korea reveals what it is like to go against and criticize a coach and the consequences it may carry. She explains that one's career would be over and one would not be accepted to universities. Cho, in his first trial in November 2019, denied all accusations on his sexual assaults. Cho, in a quick interview, denied meeting Shim at the place and time the offences are alleged to have taken place, and said that although he did meet Shim at a different time, those were for training purposes. Cho is currently serving a sentence after being convicted for the abuse inflicted upon Shim. South Korea's sports chief apologized after the accusations, referring to a "systematic flaw" which failed to prevent repeated misconduct.

In 2021, Shim was embroiled in race-fixing allegations after Shim's leaked text message with her coach implied that she tripped her teammate Choi Min-jeong on purpose during the 1000m final at the 2018 Winter Olympics. As a result, she was suspended from the national team for 2 months and barred from training. She filed an appeal to overturn the suspension in order to compete at the 2022 Winter Olympics to no avail as the South Korean court dismissed her request mid-January.

== See also ==
- List of Olympic medalists in short track speed skating
- List of Youth Olympic Games gold medalists who won Olympic gold medals
