= Sumire Kikuchi =

Japanese speed skater (born 1996)

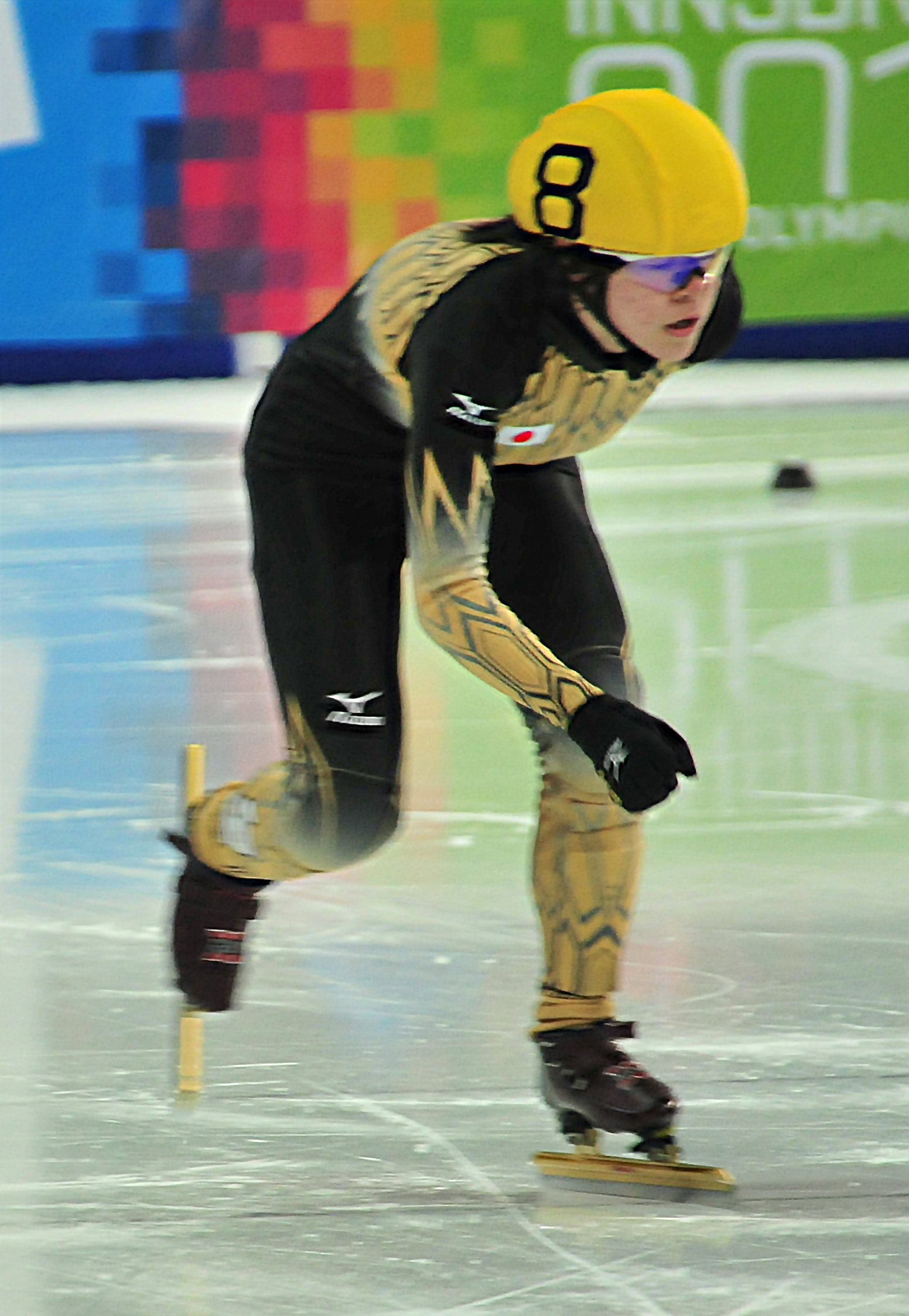
- Kikuchi in Innsbruck in 2012

Personal information
- Nationality: Japanese
- Born: 15 January 1996 (age 30) Nagano, Japan
- Height: 160 cm (5 ft 3 in)
- Weight: 52 kg (115 lb)

Sport
- Country: Japan
- Sport: Short track speed skating
Medal record
Representing Japan
Women's speed skating
World Single Distances Championships
Silver medal – second place	2023 Heerenveen	Team pursuit
Four Continents Championships
Silver medal – second place	2024 Salt Lake City	Team pursuit
Women's short-track speed skating
World Championships
Bronze medal – third place	2017 Rotterdam	3000 m relay
Asian Games
Bronze medal – third place	2017 Sapporo	1000 m
Youth Olympic Games
Bronze medal – third place	2012 Innsbruck	1000 m

Sumire Kikuchi (菊池 純礼, Kikuchi Sumire; born 15 January 1996) is a Japanese short track speed skater. She competed in the women's 500 metres at the 2018 Winter Olympics.
