= Vietnam at the 2017 Asian Winter Games =

- IOC code: VIE
- NOC: Vietnam Olympic Committee

in Sapporo and Obihiro February 19–26
- Competitors: 6 in 1 sport
- Flag bearers: Nguyen Duc Manh(Opening and Closing Ceremony)
- Medals: Gold 0 Silver 0 Bronze 0 Total 0

Asian Winter Games appearances
- 2017; 2025; 2029

Vietnam is competed at the 2017 Asian Winter Games in Sapporo and Obihiro, Japan from February 19 to 26. This marked the country's official debut at the Asian Winter Games. The team consisted of six athletes (all male).

== Background ==
Vietnam is located in a humid continental climate zone, meaning there is no snow or temperatures that are conducive to practicing winter sports outside. Therefore, to prepare for these games the Vietnamese athletes had to practice on sand dunes for three months near the town of Mũi Né in Southern Vietnam.

== Competitors ==
The following table lists the Vietnamese delegation per sport and gender.

Sport	Men	Women	Total
Alpine skiing	3	0	3
Cross-country skiing	1	0	1
Snowboarding	2	0	2
Total	6	0	6

== Alpine skiing ==
Vietnam's alpine skiing team consists of three athletes.

Men

Athlete	Event	Run 1		Run 2		Total	
Athlete	Event	Time	Rank	Time	Rank	Time	Rank
Nguyen Van An	Men's slalom	1:44.95	30	DNF			
Nguyen Vo Huu Vinh	Men's slalom	DSQ					
Pham Tien Dat	Men's slalom	Injured, did not compete					

== Cross-country skiing ==
Vietnam's cross-county skiing team consists of one athlete.

Men

Athlete	Event	Result	
Athlete	Event	Time	Rank
Nguyen Duc Manh	10 kilometre classical	1:04:30.0	22

== Snowboarding ==
Vietnam's snowboarding team consists of two male athletes.

Athlete	Event	Run 1		Run 2		Total	
Athlete	Event	Time	Rank	Time	Rank	Time	Rank
Thai Binh Nguyen	Men's slalom	2:33.57	22	2:24.75	18	4:58.32	18
Dinh Thoi Trinh	Men's slalom	DNF					
