= Nepal at the 2017 Asian Winter Games =

- IOC code: NEP
- NOC: Nepal Olympic Committee

in Sapporo and Obihiro February 19–26
- Competitors: 3 in 1 sport
- Flag bearer: Saphal-Ram Shrestha
- Medals: Gold 0 Silver 0 Bronze 0 Total 0

Asian Winter Games appearances
- 2003; 2007; 2011; 2017; 2025; 2029

Nepal competed in the 2017 Asian Winter Games in Sapporo and Obihiro, Japan from February 19 to 26. The country is scheduled to compete in one sport (two disciplines).

Nepal's team consisted of three athletes (one man and two women).

Alpine skier Saphal-Ram Shrestha was the country's flagbearer during the parade of nations at the opening ceremony.

== Competitors ==
The following table lists the Nepalese delegation per sport and gender.

Sport	Men	Women	Total
Alpine skiing	1	1	2
Cross-country skiing	0	1	1
Total	1	2	3

== Alpine skiing ==
Nepal's alpine skiing delegation consists of two athletes (one man and one woman).

Athlete	Event	Run 1		Run 2		Total	
Athlete	Event	Time	Rank	Time	Rank	Time	Rank
Saphal-Ram Shrestha	Men's giant slalom	DNF					
Saphal-Ram Shrestha	Men's slalom	1:15.45	27	DNF			
Sangita Lama	Women's giant slalom	2:11.91	28	DNF			
Sangita Lama	Women's slalom	1:49.09	29	2:37.97	24	4:27.06	24

== Cross-country skiing ==
Nepal's cross-country skiing delegation consists of one woman. Manikala Rai competed in two races, finishing in 19th out of 23rd position in the women's 10 kilometre freestyle event.

Distance
Woman

Athlete	Event	Final		
Athlete	Event	Time	Deficit	Rank
Manikala Rai	10 km freestyle	43:35.1	+13:10.5	19
Manikala Rai	30 km freestyle mass start	59:10.9	+15:42.3	20
