= Uzbekistan at the 2017 Asian Winter Games =

- IOC code: UZB
- NOC: National Olympic Committee of the Republic of Uzbekistan

in Sapporo and Obihiro February 19–26
- Competitors: 1 in 1 sport
- Flag bearer: Kamila Yuldasheva(Opening) Misha Ge(Closing)
- Medals: Gold 0 Silver 0 Bronze 0 Total 0

Asian Winter Games appearances
- 1996; 1999; 2003; 2007; 2011; 2017; 2025; 2029

Uzbekistan competed at the 2017 Asian Winter Games in Sapporo and Obihiro, Japan from February 19 to 26. The country competed with one athlete in one sport: figure skating.

Uzbekistan originally did not enter any athletes at the close of entries in December 2016. However, the country was allowed to enter athletes after the deadline.

== Competitors ==
The following table lists the Uzbekistani delegation per sport and gender.

Sport	Men	Women	Total
Figure skating	1	0	1
Total	1	0	1

== Figure skating ==
Uzbekistan's lone athlete competed in the men's singles event. Misha Ge, scored 76.18 points in the short program to be ranked eighth.

Individual

Athlete(s)	Event	SP		FS		Total	
Athlete(s)	Event	Points	Rank	Points	Rank	Points	Rank
Misha Ge	Men's	76.18	8	157.75	5	233.93	6

== See also ==
- Uzbekistan at the 2018 Winter Olympics
