= Li Zijun =

Chinese figure skater

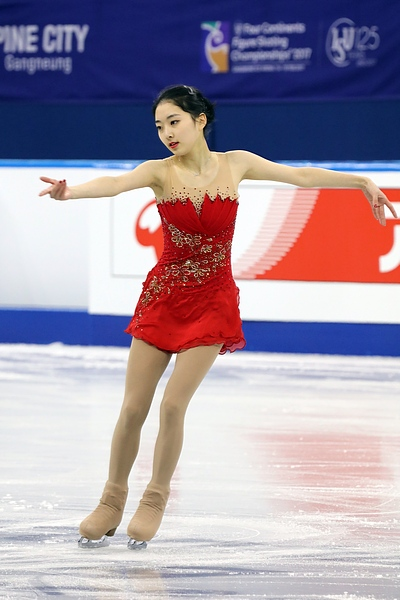
- Li at the 2017 Four Continents Championships

Personal information
- Native name: 李子君
- Full name: Li Zijun
- Born: December 14, 1996 (age 29) Changchun, China
- Home town: Beijing, China
- Height: 1.63 m (5 ft 4 in)

Figure skating career
- Country: China
- Skating club: Jilin Winter Sports Centre
- Began skating: 2001
- Retired: November 13, 2018
Medal record
Representing China
Figure skating: Ladies' singles
Four Continents Championships
Bronze medal – third place	2014 Taipei	Ladies' singles
Asian Winter Games
Silver medal – second place	2017 Sapporo	Ladies' singles
Winter Youth Olympics
Bronze medal – third place	2012 Innsbruck	Ladies' singles
Junior Grand Prix Final
Bronze medal – third place	2010–11 Beijing	Ladies' singles

Li Zijun (Chinese: 李子君; pinyin: Lǐ Zǐjūn; December 14, 1996) is a retired Chinese competitive figure skater. She is the 2017 Asian Winter Games silver medalist and the 2014 Four Continents bronze medalist.

On the junior level, Li is the 2012 Winter Youth Olympic bronze medalist and the 2010 JGP Final bronze medalist. Domestically, she is a four-time (2011–2014) Chinese national champion.

Li represented China at the 2014 Winter Olympics.

== Personal life ==
Li was born on December 14, 1996, in Changchun, China.

In 2023, Li announced that she had gotten married and had a daughter.

== Career ==
=== 2010–11 season: First senior national title ===
Li debuted on the ISU Junior Grand Prix circuit during the 2010–11 season. She won the bronze medal in Austria and placed fourth in the Czech Republic to qualify for the Final. At the Junior Grand Prix Final, she tied with Risa Shoji for third place. She won the bronze medal on the tie-breaker.

Li went on to win her first senior national title. She finished ninth at the 2011 World Junior Championships.

=== 2011–12 season: Bronze at Youth Olympics ===
Li placed second in both of her assigned 2011–12 Junior Grand Prix events and qualified for the Junior Grand Prix Final which was held in Quebec City, Canada. She finished fourth at the event. At the Youth Olympics, she won the bronze medal. She then competed at the 2012 Junior World Championships and finished fifth. Concluding her season, Li won gold at her first senior international, the Triglav Trophy.

=== 2012–13 season: Senior ISU Championship debut ===
In the 2012–13 season, Li debuted on the senior Grand Prix series. She was fifth at her first event, the 2012 Cup of China, and fourth at the 2012 NHK Trophy, where she posted a personal best combined total score. Li won her third national title at the 2013 Chinese Championships. She then competed at the 2013 Four Continents Championships and finished fifth. She finished seventh at Worlds after placing twelfth in the short program and fourth in the long. She received the second highest technical score in the free skate, only after Kim Yuna.

=== 2013–14 season: Bronze at Four Continents ===
In the 2013–14 ISU Grand Prix season, Li's first event was the 2013 Cup of China where she finished tenth. Prior to her next Grand Prix assignment, the 2013 NHK Trophy, her coach Li Mingzhu stated, "She's getting taller and bigger, but losing power and coordination" and said it was affecting her self-confidence. The skater withdrew from the NHK Trophy, which was scheduled for the following week. She returned to competition at the 2014 Four Continents Championships, placing second in the short, third in the long and won the bronze medal overall behind gold medalist winner Kanako Murakami, and second-place finisher Satoko Miyahara. Li then competed at the 2014 Winter Olympics in Sochi, Russia where she finished fourteenth. At the 2014 World Championships, Li finished seventeenth overall.

=== 2014–15 season ===
After the 2013–14 season, Li's head coach Li Mingzhu's contract to coach young Chinese skate for the 2014 Olympics ended and she moved back to the United States, while Li remained in China. In October, Gao Haijun became Li's new coach.

Li finished 6th at the 2014 Cup of China, after placing fifth in the short program and sixth in the free skate. At the 2014 NHK Trophy, she placed fifth in the short, eighth in the free, and seventh overall. She went on to win her fourth national title at the Chinese Championships, placing first by over 25 points.

At the 2015 Four Continents, Li finished in fifth-place after placing fifth in the short program and fourth in the free skate, 1.52 points back of third place. At the 2015 World Championships in Shanghai where she placed sixth in the short program and eleventh in the free skate to finish ninth overall. At the 2015 World Team Trophy, she placed seventh in the individual event and Team China placed fifth overall.

=== 2015–16 season ===
For the 2015–16 Grand Prix series, Li was assigned to compete at 2015 Cup of China and 2015 NHK Trophy. She placed ninth in China and seventh in Japan.

She finished tenth at the 2016 Four Continents Championships in Taipei and eleventh at the 2016 World Championships in Boston.

=== 2016–17 season ===
Ahead of the 2016–17 season, Li returned to train under Li Mingzhu in Artesia, California, and under Pang Qing. She later spent time training with Alexei Mishin in Saint Petersburg, Russia, and with Gao Haijun in Changchun, China.

Li began the season with a fourth-place finish at the 2016 Rostelecom Cup before going on to place eighth at the 2016 Cup of China.

At the 2017 Four Continents Championships in Gangneung, South Korea, Li finished seventh after placing eighth in the short program and fifth in the free skate.

Li then went on to compete at the 2017 Asian Winter Games where she won the silver medal behind Choi Da-bin.

At the 2017 World Championships in Helsinki, Finland, Li finished in twenty-first place after placing twentieth in both the short and free program segments of the competition.

Li finished the season by competing at the 2017 World Team Trophy. After placing ninth in the short program, Li managed to score personal bests in both the free program and combined total scores. Team China would finish in fifth place overall.

=== 2017–18 season ===
Although Li was assigned to compete at the 2017 Cup of China and the 2017 Internationaux de France, she withdrew from both events. Zhao Hongbo spoke on her behalf, stating that an injury was the reason for Li's withdrawals.

She did not compete for the remainder of the season.

In November 2018, Li announced her retirement from competitive figure skating on her Weibo account, stating that she no longer felt fulfilled from competing. She went on to say, "I am ready to embrace the new chapter of my life and I will continue being with you all."

== Programs ==
Season	Short program	Free skating	Exhibition
2017–2018	East of Eden by Lee Holdridge choreo. by Lori Nichol	Galaxy by Yuko Toyoda choreo. by Lori Nichol	
2016–2017	Le Diable Matou by Dompierre choreo. by Lori Nichol	Only For Love by Tan Dun choreo. by Lori Nichol	Baton Bunny soundtrack
2015–2016	Claire de Lune by Claude Debussy; La Polka de Paris (from Cinderella) by Patrick Doyle choreo. by Lori Nichol	The Artist by Ludovic Bource choreo. by Lori Nichol	The Water Is Wide performed by Charlotte Church
2014–2015	Waltz of the Flowers from (The Nutcracker) by Pyotr Ilyich Tchaikovsky choreo. by Lori Nichol	Moon River by Henry Mancini performed by John Bayless and Nancy LaMott choreo. by Lori Nichol	I Dreamed a Dream (from Les Misérables) from Glee performed by Idina Menzel and Lea Michele
2013–2014	Danzarin from Tango Lorca choreo. by Lori Nichol	Coppélia by Léo Delibes choreo. by Lori Nichol	The Sound of Music by Richard Rodgers
2012–2013	Dark Eyes choreo. by Jiang Hailan	Sleeping Beauty by Pyotr Ilyich Tchaikovsky choreo. by Lori Nichol	Express Yourself; Legend by Li Jian performed by Chang Jing
2011–2012	The Addams Family by Marc Shaiman; The Carousel (from The Haunting) by Jerry Goldsmith choreo. by Jiang Hailan	Scenes of Summer by Lee Holdridge choreo. by David Wilson	A Spoonful of Sugar by Robert B. Sherman, Richard M. Sherman; Simple Things by Kay Huang
2010–2011	Up by Michael Giacchino choreo. by Karen Kwan-Oppegard	Until The Last Moment by Yanni choreo. by Karen Kwan-Oppegard	Snow White and the Seven Dwarfs (1937 Walt Disney film)
2009–2010	East of Eden by Lee Holdridge	Snow White and the Seven Dwarfs (1937 Walt Disney film)	Over the Rainbow (from The Wizard of Oz) by Judy Garland

== Competitive highlights ==
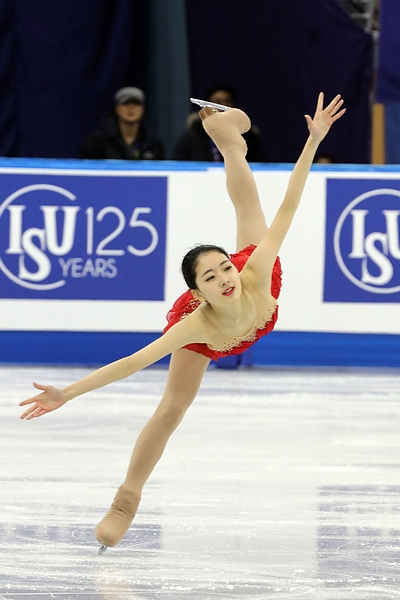
Li at the 2017 Four Continents Championships

GP: Grand Prix; JGP: Junior Grand Prix

International
Event	09–10	10–11	11–12	12–13	13–14	14–15	15–16	16–17	17–18
Olympics					14th				
Worlds				7th	17th	9th	11th	21st	
Four Continents				5th	3rd	5th	10th	7th	
GP Cup of China				5th	10th	6th	9th	8th	WD
GP France									WD
GP NHK Trophy				4th		7th	7th		
GP Rostelecom								4th	
Asian Games								2nd	
Triglav Trophy			1st						
Volvo Open Cup				1st					
International: Junior
Junior Worlds		9th	5th						
Youth Olympics			3rd						
JGP Final		3rd	4th						
JGP Austria		3rd	2nd						
JGP Czech Rep.		4th							
JGP Latvia			2nd						
National
Chinese Champ.	2nd	1st	1st	1st		1st			
National Games			1st				1st		
Team events
World Team; Trophy				5th T 6th P		5th T 7th P		5th T 7th P	
TBD = Assigned; WD = Withdrew; T = Team result; P = Personal result. Medals awarded for team result only.

== Detailed results ==
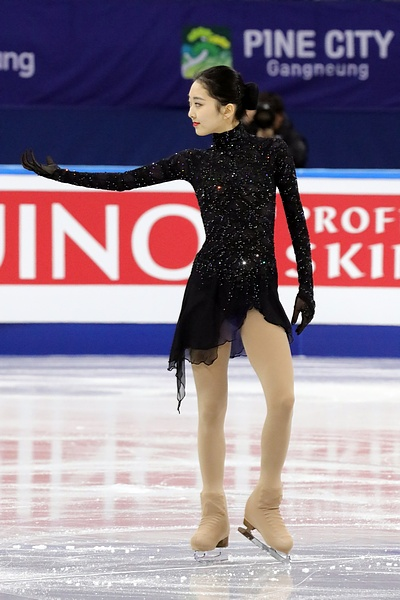
Li at the 2017 Four Continents Championships

Small medals for short program and free skating awarded only at ISU Championships.

2016–17 season
Date	Event	SP	FS	Total
April 20–23, 2017	2017 World Team Trophy	9; 59.76	7; **128.30**	5T/7P; **188.06**
March 28 – April 2, 2017	2017 World Championships	20; 56.30	20; 103.50	21; 159.80
February 23–26, 2017	2017 Asian Winter Games	4; 58.65	3; 116.95	2; 175.60
February 15–19, 2017	2017 Four Continents Championships	8; 60.37	5; 116.68	7; 177.05
November 18–20, 2016	2016 Cup of China	7; 61.32	8; 111.08	8; 172.40
November 4–6, 2016	2016 Rostelecom Cup	5; 63.89	4; 117.94	4; 181.83
2015–16 season
Date	Event	SP	FS	Total
March 28 – April 3, 2016	2016 World Championships	11; **65.39**	12; 119.13	11; 184.52
February 16–21, 2016	2016 Four Continents Championships	6; 60.04	11; 107.84	10; 167.88
November 27–29, 2015	2015 NHK Trophy	6; 60.78	10; 105.62	7; 166.40
November 6–8, 2015	2015 Cup of China	5; 58.62	9; 100.51	9; 159.13
2014–15 season
Date	Event	SP	FS	Total
April 16–19, 2015	2015 World Team Trophy	7; 58.83	7; 103.67	5T/7P; 162.50
March 23–29, 2015	2015 World Championships	6; 61.83	11; 103.39	9; 165.22
February 9–15, 2015	2015 Four Continents Championships	5; 60.28	4; 115.64	5; 175.92
December 27–28, 2014	2014 Chinese Championships	1; 52.79	1; 109.09	1; 161.88
November 28–30, 2014	2014 NHK Trophy	5; 56.44	8; 106.46	7; 162.90
November 7–9, 2014	2014 Cup of China	5; 53.66	6; 98.96	6; 152.62
2013–14 season
Date	Event	SP	FS	Total
March 24–30, 2014	2014 World Championships	16; 54.37	17; 95.97	17; 150.34
February 6–22, 2014	2014 Winter Olympics	11; 57.55	14; 110.75	14; 168.30
January 20–26, 2014	2014 Four Continents Championships	2; 62.84	3; 118.72	3; 181.56
November 1–3, 2013	2013 Cup of China	8; 53.58	10; 85.40	10; 138.98
2012–13 season
Date	Event	SP	FS	Total
April 11–14, 2013	2013 World Team Trophy	9; 53.16	4; 118.34	5T/6P; 171.50
March 10–17, 2013	2013 World Championships	12; 56.31	4; 127.54	7; 183.85
February 8–11, 2013	2013 Four Continents Championships	10; 54.51	4; 115.91	5; 170.42
January 10–13, 2012	2013 Volvo Open Cup	1; 58.12	1; 101.98	1; 160.10
December 20–21, 2012	2013 Chinese Championships	1; 58.09	1; 117.01	1; 175.10
November 22–25, 2012	2012 NHK Trophy	3; 59.62	4; 114.49	4; 174.11
November 1–4, 2012	2012 Cup of China	5; 59.21	5; 100.85	5; 160.06

=== Junior level ===
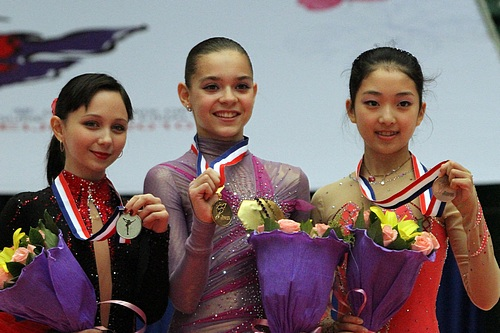
Li Zijun won bronze at the 2010–11 Junior Grand Prix Final

2011–12 season
Date	Event	Level	QR	SP	FS	Total
April 4–8, 2012	2012 Triglav Trophy	Senior	–	1; 52.74	1; 101.13	1; 153.87
Feb. 27 – March 4, 2012	2012 World Junior Championships	Junior	–	6; 51.74	5; 105.57	5; 157.31
January 14–22, 2012	2012 Youth Olympics	Junior	–	3; 50.92	2; 106.78	3; 157.70
January 4–6, 2012	12th Chinese National Winter Games	Senior	–	1; 60.56	1; 125.56	1; 186.12
December 8–11, 2011	2011–12 Junior Grand Prix Final	Junior	–	6; 43.10	4; 103.43	4; 146.53
Sept. 28 – Oct. 1, 2011	2011 Junior Grand Prix, Austria	Junior	–	2; 55.59	2; 100.81	2; 156.40
September 20–23, 2011	2012 Chinese Championships	Senior	–	3; 49.28	1; 100.77	1; 150.05
Aug. 31 – Sept. 3, 2011	2011 Junior Grand Prix, Latvia	Junior	–	1; 55.09	2; 93.10	2; 148.19
2010–11 season
Date	Event	Level	QR	SP	FS	Total
Feb. 27 – March 6, 2011	2011 World Junior Championships	Junior	3; 89.10	8; 51.00	10; 88.81	9; 139.81
December 23–24, 2010	2011 Chinese Championships	Senior	–	1; 53.24	2; 101.05	1; 154.29
December 8–12, 2010	2010–11 Junior Grand Prix Final	Junior	–	5; 49.62	4; 100.20	3; 149.82
October 13–16, 2010	2010 Junior Grand Prix, Czech Republic	Junior	–	5; 47.76	4; 100.50	4; 148.26
September 15–18, 2010	2010 Junior Grand Prix, Austria	Junior	–	5; 47.56	3; 97.20	3; 144.76
2009–10 season
Date	Event	Level	QR	SP	FS	Total
December 19–20, 2009	2010 Chinese Junior Championships	Junior	–	1; 51.23	1; 89.70	1; 140.93
September 3–5, 2009	2010 Chinese Championships	Senior	–	3; 44.82	2; 83.94	2; 128.76

- QR = Qualifying round
- Personal bests highlighted in bold.
