= Li Mingzhu =

Chinese figure skater and coach

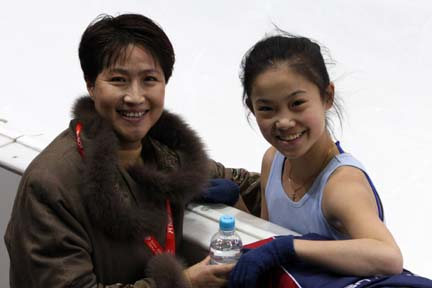
- Li with student Caroline Zhang at the 2007-2008 Grand Prix Final

Personal information
- Born: 30 October 1962 (age 63) Yantai, Shandong, China

Figure skating career
- Country: China

Li Mingzhu (Chinese: 李明珠; born on October 30, 1962) is a Chinese figure skater. She is a World and Olympic figure skating coach. She coached Chen Lu to her World title and her first Olympic bronze medal. Currently, Li works at the East West Ice Palace in Artesia, California.

Her current and former students include Chen Lu, Caroline Zhang, Geng Bingwa, Zhang Kexin, and Li Zijun.
