= Nepal at the 2007 Asian Winter Games =

- IOC code: NEP
- NOC: Nepal Olympic Committee

in Changchun
- Competitors: 2

Asian Winter Games appearances
- 2003; 2007; 2011; 2017; 2025; 2029

Nepal participated in the 2007 Asian Winter Games held in Changchun, China from January 28, 2007 to February 4, 2007.

== Participation details ==
=== Alpine skiing ===
==== Entry list ====
- Pramod Lama

=== Cross-country skiing ===
==== Entry list ====
- Dachhiri Sherpa
