= Ryan Espiritu =

Filipino American snowboarder

Personal information
- Full name: Ryan Christopher Espiritu
- Born: December 14, 1991 (age 34)

Sport
- Country: Philippines
- Sport: Snowboarding
- Events: Parallel slalom, giant slalom, Slalom
- Updated on 20 February 2017

Ryan Christopher Espiritu is a Filipino Canadian snowboarder who represents the Philippines in international competitions.

Espiritu has also represented the country at the 2010–11 FIS Snowboard World Cup at the Parallel slalom – Giant slalom event held on February 20, 2011, in Stoneham, Canada where he finished 46th out of 47 placed competitors, as well as at the 2013 FIS Snowboarding World Championships at the men's parallel slalom event where he finished also 46th out of 47 placed competitors. In the continental level, he competed for the Philippines at the 2017 Asian Winter Games He participated in the giant slalom and Slalom events.

In the junior level, Espiritu competed at the FIS Junior World Championships in 2010 and 2011.
