= Nepal at the 2011 Asian Winter Games =

- IOC code: NEP
- NOC: Nepal Olympic Committee

in Astana and Almaty
- Competitors: 1 in 1 sport
- Medals: Gold 0 Silver 0 Bronze 0 Total 0

Asian Winter Games appearances
- 2003; 2007; 2011; 2017; 2025; 2029

Nepal participated in the 2011 Asian Winter Games in Almaty and Astana, Kazakhstan from January 30, 2011 to February 6, 2011.

== Alpine skiing ==
Nepal will send 1 alpine skier.

Men

Athlete	Event	Final	
Athlete	Event	Time	Rank
Prabin Karmacharya	Super-G	2:37.65	20
