= Nepal at the 2025 Asian Winter Games =

- Flag of Nepal
- IOC code: NEP
- NOC: Nepal Olympic Committee

in Harbin, China 7 February 2025 – 14 February 2025
- Competitors: 4 in 1 sport
- Flag bearers: Saphal Ram Shrestha & Laxmi Rai
- Medals: Gold 0 Silver 0 Bronze 0 Total 0

Asian Winter Games appearances
- 2003; 2007; 2011; 2017; 2025; 2029

Nepal competed at the 2025 Asian Winter Games in Harbin, China, from February 7 to 14. The Nepalese delegation consisted of four alpine skiers (two men and two women). Alpine skiers Saphal Ram Shrestha and Laxmi Rai were the country's opening ceremony flagbearers.

== Competitors ==
The following table lists the Nepalese delegation per sport and gender.

Sport	Men	Women	Total
Alpine skiing	2	2	4
Total	2	2	4

== Alpine skiing ==
Nepal entered four alpine skiers (two per gender).

Athlete	Event	Run 1		Run 2		Total	
Athlete	Event	Time	Rank	Time	Rank	Time	Rank
Saphal Ram Shrestha	Men's slalom	1:00.81	35	58.05	28	1:58.86	29
Chhowang Mingyur Tamang	Men's slalom	Did not finish					
Laxmi Rai	Women's slalom	1:38.91	41	1:43.22	35	3:22.13	35
Debora Timalsina	Women's slalom	1:34.46	40	1:32.60	34	3:07.06	34

== See also ==
- Nepal at the 2024 Winter Youth Olympics
