= Singapore at the 2017 Asian Winter Games =

- IOC code: SGP
- NOC: Singapore National Olympic Council

in Sapporo and Obihiro February 19–26
- Competitors: 22 in 2 sports
- Flag bearer: Lucas Ng
- Medals: Gold 0 Silver 0 Bronze 0 Total 0

Asian Winter Games appearances
- 2011; 2017; 2025; 2029

Singapore competed in the 2017 Asian Winter Games in Sapporo and Obihiro, Japan from February 19 to 26. After competing with just one athlete in their Asian Winter Games debut, the country sent twenty-two athletes in two sports (three disciplines).

Short track speed skater Lucas Ng was the country's flagbearer during the parade of nations at the opening ceremony.

== Background ==
This will be the second multi-sport event (after the 2016 Asian Beach Games, where Singapore competed under the code of SGP, after changing it in late 2016 from SIN.

== Competitors ==
The following table lists the Singaporean delegation per sport and gender.

Sport	Men	Women	Total
Figure skating	0	2	2
Ice hockey	18	0	18
Short track speed skating	1	1	2
Total	19	3	22

== Figure skating ==
Singapore competed in the figure skating competition for the first time ever. The team consisted of two female athletes competing in the ladies individual event. Shuran finished in sixth place overall, the highest placement of the team at the Games, and her teammate, Ing finished in eleventh place.

Individual

Athlete(s)	Event	SP		FP		Total	
Athlete(s)	Event	Points	Rank	Points	Rank	Points	Rank
Yu Shuran	Ladies	50.99	7	95.71	6	146.70	6
Chloe Ing	Ladies	44.64	11	82.71	8	127.35	11

== Ice hockey ==
The Singaporean hockey competed in division one. This also marked the country's debut in the sport of ice hockey at the Asian Winter Games. Singapore finished in sixth and last place (10th place overall) in division one of the competition.

=== Men's tournament ===
Singapore was represented by the following 18 athletes:

- Eugene Chin (G)
- Kenny Liang (G)
- Ang Yu-jin (D)
- Chen Pei-huan (D)
- Chew Wee (D)
- Samuel Lim (D)
- Joewe Lam (D)
- Loh Chee-seng (C) (D)
- Richard O'Brien (D)
- Chiong Woon-lip (F)
- Benjamin Huang (F)
- Lam Kin-yu (A) (F)
- Gabriel Lau (F)
- Joshua Lee (F)
- Liu Zhi-yang (F)
- Siah Ming-zhe (F)
- Peter Tan (F)
- Ryan Tan (F)

Legend: G = Goalie, D = Defense, F = Forward, C = Captain, A = Assistant captain

Rank	Team	Pld	W	OW	OL	L	GF	GA	GD	Pts
5	Thailand	5	4	1	0	0	36	12	+24	14
6	Chinese Taipei	5	3	1	1	0	34	13	+21	12
7	United Arab Emirates	5	3	0	0	2	29	24	+5	9
8	Mongolia	5	2	0	0	3	25	23	+2	6
9	Hong Kong	5	1	0	1	3	27	27	0	4
10	Singapore	5	0	0	0	5	4	56	–52	0

18 February 2017; 12:00	Singapore	1–12 (0–2, 1–5, 0–5)	Hong Kong	Mikaho Gymnasium; Attendance: 260

Game reference
			Referee: (Germany) Benjamin Hoppe; Linesmen: (Austria) Maximilian Gatol (South Korea) Park Jun-soo
12 min	Penalties	4 min	Referee: (Germany) Benjamin Hoppe; Linesmen: (Austria) Maximilian Gatol (South Korea) Park Jun-soo
16	Shots	45	Referee: (Germany) Benjamin Hoppe; Linesmen: (Austria) Maximilian Gatol (South Korea) Park Jun-soo

20 February 2017; 15:30	Mongolia	8–0 (2–0, 4–0, 2–0)	Singapore	Mikaho Gymnasium; Attendance: 240

Game reference
14 min	Penalties	66 min
41	Shots	10

21 February 2017; 12:00	Singapore	1–11 (1–3, 0–5, 0–3)	Chinese Taipei	Mikaho Gymnasium; Attendance: 200

Game reference
6 min	Penalties	14 min
16	Shots	43

23 February 2017; 19:00	United Arab Emirates	11–2 (3–0, 3–1, 5–1)	Singapore	Mikaho Gymnasium; Attendance: 160

Game reference
4 min	Penalties	22 min
44	Shots	5

25 February 2017; 15:30	Thailand	14–0 (5–0, 5–0, 4–0)	Singapore	Mikaho Gymnasium; Attendance: 250

Game reference
4 min	Penalties	2 min
50	Shots	13

== Short track speed skating ==
Singapore entered two athletes (one male and one female) in the short track speed skating competitions.

Athlete	Event	Heat		Quarterfinal		Semifinal		Final	
Athlete	Event	Time	Rank	Time	Rank	Time	Rank	Time	Rank
Lucas Ng	Men's 500 m	45.115	3 q	46.432	4	did not advance			
Lucas Ng	Men's 1000 m	1:34.332	4	did not advance					
Lucas Ng	Men's 1500 m	2:47.061	4	—N/a		did not advance			
Cheyenne Goh	Women's 500 m	50.878	2 Q	49.227	3	did not advance			
Cheyenne Goh	Women's 1000 m	1:41.672	3 q	1:46.560	3	did not advance			
Cheyenne Goh	Women's 1500 m	3:00.201	3 Q	—N/a		2:53.343	5	did not advance	

== See also ==
- Singapore at the 2018 Winter Olympics
