= Philippines at the 2017 Asian Winter Games =

- IOC code: PHI
- NOC: Philippine Olympic Committee
- Website: www.olympic.ph (in English)

in Sapporo and Obihiro February 19–26
- Competitors: 29 in 3 sports
- Flag bearer: Carlo Garrucho
- Medals: Gold 0 Silver 0 Bronze 0 Total 0

Asian Winter Games appearances
- 1990; 1996–2003; 2007; 2011; 2017; 2025; 2029

The Philippines competed in the 2017 Asian Winter Games in Sapporo and Obihiro, Japan from February 19 to 26. The team consisted of 29 athletes in three sports (four disciplines) and nine officials, which represented the largest Filipino delegation at the Asian Winter Games compared to the delegations sent in previous editions the Philippines participated in.

On February 19, 2017 it was announced that ice hockey player Carlo Garrucho would be the country's flagbearer during the parade of nations at the opening ceremony.

== Competitors ==
The following table lists the Filipino delegation per sport and gender.

Sport	Men	Women	Total
Figure skating	2	2	4
Ice hockey	23	0	23
Short track speed skating	0	1	1
Snowboarding	1	0	1
Total	26	3	29

== Figure skating ==
Four figure skaters were named to the Filipino team, including 2014 Winter Olympics competitor Michael Christian Martinez.

Singles

Athlete(s)	Event	SP		FP		Total	
Athlete(s)	Event	Points	Rank	Points	Rank	Points	Rank
Jules Alpe	Men's	42.38	17	86.03	17	128.41	17
Michael Christian Martinez	Men's	76.53	7	135.43	9	211.96	9
Samantha Cabiles	Ladies	28.54	14	55.11	16	83.65	15
Shayane Casapao	Ladies	28.54	18	46.66	21	70.99	19

== Ice hockey ==
The Philippines entered an ice hockey team for the first time. The team will play in division two of the competition. The team consists of 23 athletes. The Philippines finished in third place (13th place overall) in division 2 of the competition.

=== Men's tournament ===
The Philippines was represented by the following athletes:

- Gianpietro Iseppi (G)
- Paolo Spafford (G)
- Javier Alfonso (D)
- Carlo Garrucho (D)
- Alison Lapiz (D)
- Gino Orda (D)
- Jed Reyes (D)
- Paul Sanchez (D)
- Julius Santiago (D)
- Miguel Serrano (D)
- Jose Cadiz (F)
- Philip Cheng (F)
- Steven Füglister (C) (F)
- Francois Gautlier (A) (F)
- Benjamin Imperial (F)
- Lenard Rigel Lancero II (F)
- Carl Montano (F)
- Hector Navasero (F)
- Miguel Relampagos (F)
- Jon Samson (F)
- Julian Santiago (F)
- Patrick Syquiatco (F)
- Michael Wang (F)

Legend: G = Goalie, D = Defense-man, F = Forward, C = Captain, A = Assistant captain

Group A

Rank	Team	Pld	W	OW	OL	L	GF	GA	GD	Pts
1	Kyrgyzstan	3	3	0	0	0	22	7	+15	9
2	Philippines	3	2	0	0	1	27	15	+12	6
3	(International Olympic Committee) Independent Olympic Athletes	3	1	0	0	2	9	15	–6	3
4	Qatar	3	0	0	0	3	6	27	–21	0

21 February 2017; 20:00	Kyrgyzstan	10–5 (6–1, 1–3, 3–1)	Philippines	Hoshioki Ice Skating Rink; Attendance: 86

Game reference
20 min	Penalties	28 min
39	Shots	27

23 February 2017; 20:00	Qatar	2–14 (1–4, 0–5, 1–5)	Philippines	Hoshioki Ice Skating Rink; Attendance: 103

Game reference
39 min	Penalties	10 min
32	Shots	50

24 February 2017; 20:00	Philippines	8–3 (2–2, 4–0, 2–1)	(International Olympic Committee) Independent Olympic Athletes	Hoshioki Ice Skating Rink; Attendance: 127

Game reference
76 min	Penalties	86 min
38	Shots	41

13th place match

26 February 2017; 9:00	Philippines	9–2 (5–0, 2–1, 2–1)	Macau	Hoshioki Ice Skating Rink; Attendance: 208

Game reference
6 min	Penalties	4 min
42	Shots	25

== Short track speed skating ==
The Philippines has entered one female competitor, marking the Asian Winter Games debut of the country in the sport.

Athlete	Event	Heats		Quarterfinal		Semifinal		Final	
Athlete	Event	Time	Rank	Time	Rank	Time	Rank	Time	Rank
Kathryn Magno	500 m	54.031	3	did not advance					
Kathryn Magno	1000 m	2:02.991	4	did not advance					
Kathryn Magno	1500 m	3:16.372	5	—N/a		did not advance			

== Snowboarding ==
The Philippines has entered one male competitor, marking the Asian Winter Games debut of the country in the sport.

Athlete	Event	Run 1		Run 2		Total	
Athlete	Event	Time	Rank	Time	Rank	Time	Rank
Ryan Espiritu	Men's giant slalom	55.84	11	47.63	14	1:43.47	11
Ryan Espiritu	Men's slalom	44.65	13	37.95	9	1:22.60	11
