= Manikala Rai =

Nepalese ultramarathon runner

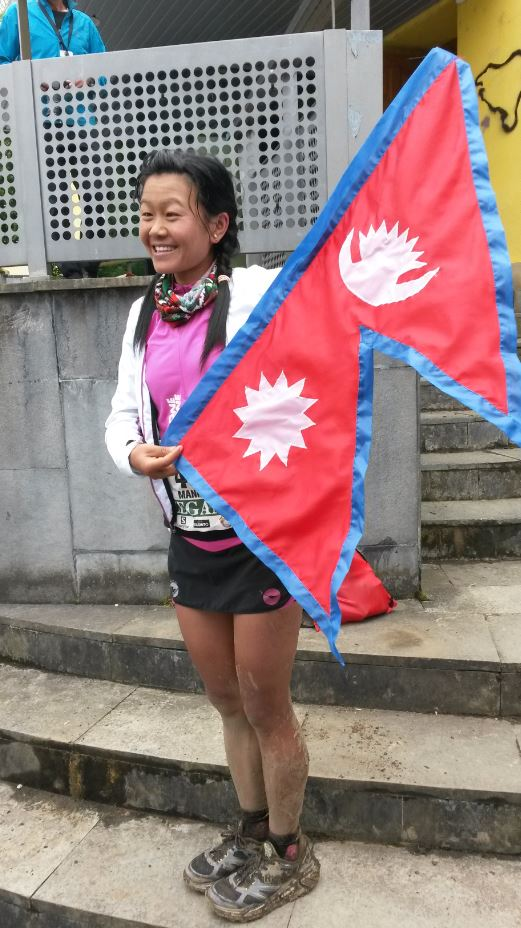
Rai in 2015, at Zegama, Spain, with the Nepalese flag

Manikala Rai (born 27 November 1988) is a Nepalese ultra runner who now lives in France.

Rai is said to be "Nepal's first international female ultra runner." She won the women's race in the North Face 100k in Hong Kong in December 2013, with a time of 15:37:08.

Rai is also a cross-country skier.
