= Kathryn Magno =

American-Filipina speed skater (born 1990)

Personal information
- Full name: Kathryn Victory Magno
- Born: March 18, 1990 (age 36) San Jose, California, U.S.
- Years active: c. 2008-2012 (figure skating) c. 2014- (speed skating)

Sport
- Country: Philippines
- Sport: Figure skating Short track speed skating
Medal record
Women's short track speed skating
Representing Philippines
Asian Short Track Speed Skating Trophy
Bronze medal – third place	2014 Mandaluyong	500 m
Bronze medal – third place	2014 Mandaluyong	1000 m
Bronze medal – third place	2014 Mandaluyong	1500 m
South East Asia Cup
Gold medal – first place	2016 Singapore	500 m
Gold medal – first place	2016 Singapore	1500 m
Gold medal – first place	2016 Singapore	1000 m
Philippine Open Short Track Championships
Gold medal – first place	2018 Mandaluyong	500 m
Gold medal – first place	2018 Mandaluyong	1500 m
Gold medal – first place	2018 Mandaluyong	1000 m
Silver medal – second place	2018 Mandaluyong	Women's Relay
Southeast Asian Open Trophy
Silver medal – second place	2019 Singapore	500 m
Silver medal – second place	2019 Singapore	1500 m
Silver medal – second place	2019 Singapore	1000 m
Silver medal – second place	2019 Singapore	Mixed Relay

Kathryn Victory Magno (born March 18, 1990) is an American-born Filipina short track speed skater and former figure skater. Magno is the first person to win a medal in speed skating for the Philippines in an international competition outside the country.

== Early life ==
Magno was born to Filipino parents in San Jose, California, United States on March 18, 1990.

== Sporting career ==
Magno started her sporting career as a figure skater representing the Philippines. She was first introduced to the sport when she was five years old. Among the competitions she entered is the 2009 Coupe Internationale de Nice.

She made a switch to short track speed skating in 2014, coming from a two year break to focus on her studies. She remarked that the scoring in figure skating is subjective and liked short track speed skating more since a definite winner is determined by a race and for its "social vibes". She entered the 2014 and 2015 Asian Short Track Speed Skating Trophy which were both hosted in the Philippines. She won three bronze medal in the 2014 edition at the women's 500m, 1,000m, and 1,500m events. She was the sole skater competing for the Philippines at the 2014 edition.

She entered the 2016 Tri-Series South East Asia Cup in Singapore funding her own trip to the city state by selling t-shirts she designed. She was the sole representative of the Philippines at the tournament. She won two golds at the women's 500m and 1,500m events with the record of 58.152 seconds and 3 minutes, 33.034 seconds respectively. Her medal at the 500m event was her country's first gold medal in an international short track speed skating tournament held outside the Philippines. She also won the 1,000m event.

In November 2016, Magno was named to the Filipino team at the 2017 Asian Winter Games in Sapporo, Japan.

At the 2018 Philippine Open Short Track Championships in the Women's Senior Category, Magno won three gold medals at the 1,500 meters, 1,000 meters and 500 meters event and a silver in the 3,000-meter relay team event with Xsandrie Viande Guimba, Corinne Molly Martinez, and Bea Won Bi Zablan.
