= Hitomi Saito (speed skater) =

Japanese speed skater (born 1990)

Personal information
- Nationality: Japanese
- Born: 9 July 1990 (age 36)
- Height: 1.52 m (5 ft 0 in)
- Weight: 48 kg (106 lb)

Sport
- Country: Japan
- Sport: Short track speed skating

Hitomi Saito (斎藤 仁美, Saitō Hitomi; born 9 July 1990) is a Japanese short track speed skater. She competed in the 2018 Winter Olympics.
