= Kim Iong-a =

Kazakhstani speed skater (born 1992)

Personal information
- Nationality: Kazakhstani
- Born: 3 August 1992 (age 33) South Korea

Sport
- Country: Kazakhstan
- Sport: Short track speed skating
Medal record
Women's short track speed skating
Representing Kazakhstan
Winter Universiade
Bronze medal – third place	2017 Almaty	3000 m
Asian Winter Games
Bronze medal – third place	2017 Sapporo	3000 m

- Kim Iong-a
- Hangul: 김영아
- RR: Gim Yeonga
- MR: Kim Yŏnga

Aliya Kim
- Hangul: 알리야 킴
- RR: Alriya Kim
- MR: Alliya K'im

Kim Iong-a (born 3 August 1992), also known as Aliya Kim, is a South Korean-born Kazakhstani short track speed skater. She competed in the women's 1000 metres and women's 1500 metres at the 2018 Winter Olympics.
