= Anastassiya Krestova =

Kazakhstani speed skater (born 1996)

Personal information
- Full name: Anastassiya Vladimirovna Krestova
- Nationality: Kazakhstani
- Born: 31 January 1996 (age 30) Rudny, Kostanay, Kazakhstan
- Height: 168 cm (5 ft 6 in)
- Weight: 62 kg (137 lb)

Sport
- Sport: Short track speed skating
Medal record
Women's short track speed skating
Representing Kazakhstan
Universiade
Bronze medal – third place	2017 Almaty	3000 m

Anastassiya Krestova (Анастасия Крестова, born 31 January 1996) is a Kazakhstani short track speed skater. She competed in the women's 500 metres at the 2018 Winter Olympics.
