= Guo Yihan =

Chinese speed skater

Personal information
- Born: 9 March 1995 (age 31) Jilin, China
- Height: 1.72 m (5 ft 8 in)
- Weight: 58 kg (128 lb)

Sport
- Country: China
- Sport: Short track speed skating

Achievements and titles
- Personal best(s): 500m: 44.395 (2014); 1000m: 1:32.077 (2014); 1500m: 2:23.308 (2012)
Medal record
World Championships
Gold medal – first place	2017 Rotterdam	3000 m relay
Silver medal – second place	2016 Seoul	3000 m
World Junior Championships
Silver medal – second place	2012 Melbourne	3000 m relay
Bronze medal – third place	2014 Erzurum	3000 m relay
Winter Universiade
Gold medal – first place	2013 Trentino	1000 m

Guo Yihan (Chinese: 郭奕含, born on 9 March 1995) is a Chinese female short-track speed-skater. She won the gold medal for Ladies' 1000 meters in 2013 Winter Universiade, Trentino.
