= Makomanai Ice Arena =

Indoor ice skating arena in Minami-ku, Sapporo, Japan

Makomanai Sekisui Heim Ice Arena
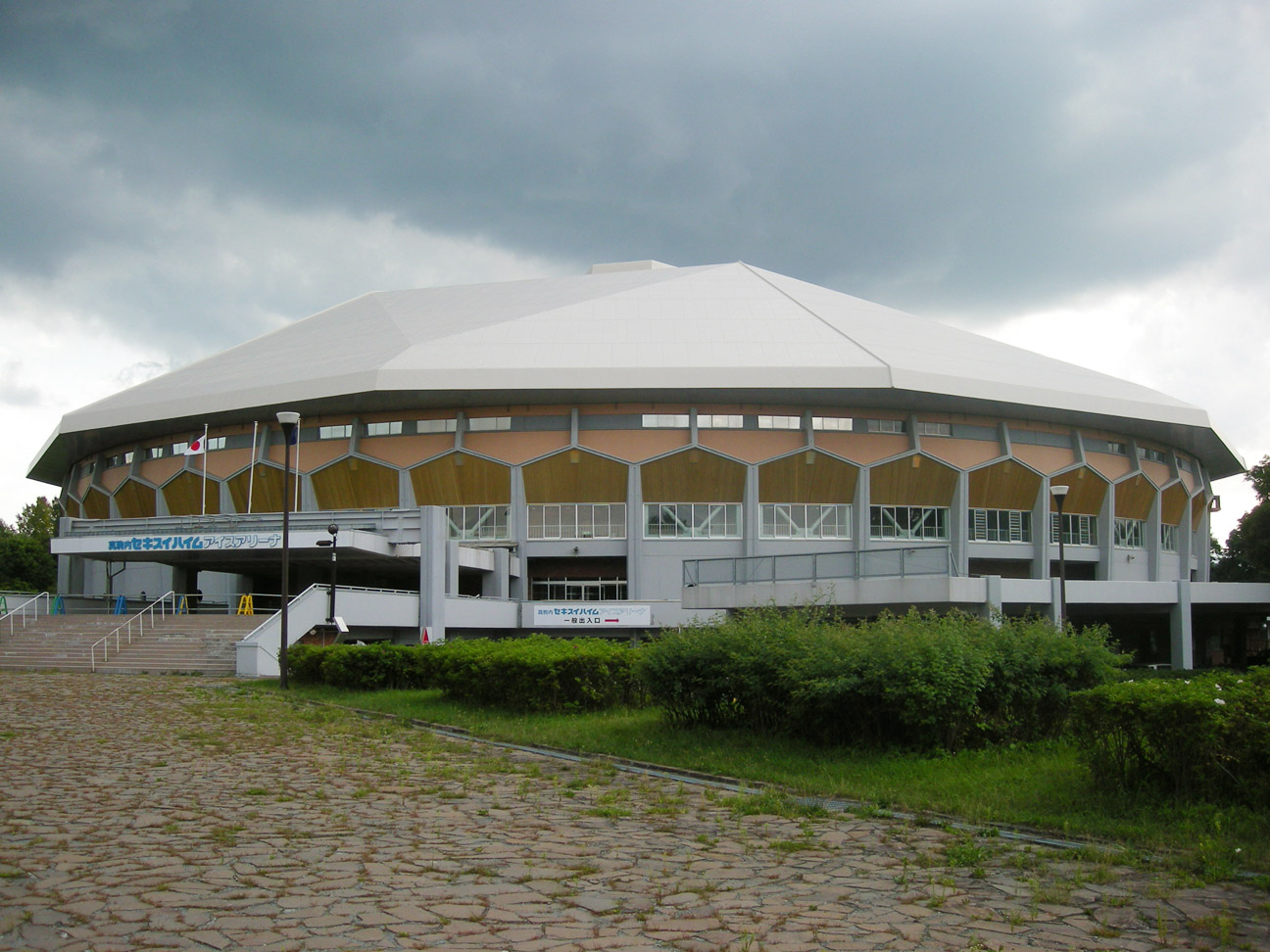
- Interactive map of Makomanai Sekisui Heim Ice Arena
- Former names: Makomanai Indoor Stadium (1972–2007)
- Location: Sapporo, Japan
- Coordinates: 42°59′58″N 141°20′50.44″E
- Owner: Hokkaido Prefecture
- Operator: Hokkaido Sports Association
- Capacity: 10,024

Construction
- Opened: 1972

Makomanai Sekisui Heim Ice Arena (真駒内セキスイハイム アイスアリーナ) is an indoor ice skating arena in Minami-ku, Sapporo, Japan. It was built in December, 1970, holds 11,500 people (10,024 seats, fixed plus temporary, and 1,476 standing places), and has an area of 10,133 m^{2} in total.

The figure skating and some of the ice hockey games and the closing ceremonies from the 1972 Winter Olympics were held at this arena.

== Overview ==
After the Games, the arena is utilized as a permanent ice skating rink open to the community.

Located at the northern end of the Makomanai Park, the arena is used not only as an ice skating venue, but also for a huge meeting, and concert venue.

The stadium has been known as its nickname, "Makomanai Ice Arena", and on April 1, 2007, the nickname was changed to the "Makomanai Sekisui Heim Ice Arena", after Sekisui Heim, a Japanese real estate company, acquired its naming rights.

In 1998, it was one of the venues for the Volleyball Men's World Championship, the Pool D of the tournament was played here.

== Location ==
The arena is a 20 to 25 minute walk from Makomanai Station on the Namboku Line.

== See also ==
- List of indoor arenas in Japan
