= 2017 Asian Winter Games =

Multi-sport event in Sapporo and Obihiro, Japan

VIII Asian Winter Games
- Host city: Sapporo and Obihiro, Japan
- Motto: Beyond Your Ambitions (世界につながる、冬にする, Sekai ni tsunagaru, fuyu ni suru)
- Nations: 32
- Athletes: 1,147
- Events: 64 in 11 sports
- Opening: 19 February 2017
- Closing: 26 February 2017
- Opened by: Naruhito; Crown Prince of Japan
- Closed by: Timothy Fok; Vice President of the Olympic Council of Asia
- Athlete's Oath: Mari Motohashi; Go Tanaka
- Judge's Oath: Masatsugu Odoka; Mai Mizuhori
- Torch lighter: Masahiko Harada
- Main venue: Sapporo Dome (opening ceremony); Makomanai Ice Arena (closing ceremony)
- Website: sapporo2017.org (archived)

Summer

Winter

The 2017 Asian Winter Games (2017アジア冬季競技大会), also known as Sapporo 2017 (札幌2017), were a series of continental winter multi-sport events and the 8th edition of the Asian Winter Games. They were held from 19 to 26 February 2017 in Sapporo and Obihiro, Japan.

The games were originally scheduled for 2015. However, on 3 July 2009, the Olympic Council of Asia's general assembly, hosted in Singapore, decided to move the games to one year before the following Winter Olympics. The games began on 19 February with the opening ceremony (the curling and hockey events began the day before) and ended with the closing ceremony on 26 February.

Sapporo and Obihiro were selected to be the host cities for the games on 31 January 2011, as they were the only bidding cities. The hosting contract was signed by Tsunekazu Takeda, the president of the Japanese Olympic Committee. It was the third time that Sapporo hosted the event and the fourth time that a city in Japan did. Previously, the city held the two first editions of the Games in 1986 and 1990. Before hosting the first Asian Winter Games, the city also hosted the 1972 Winter Olympics and 1991 Winter Universiade.

== Bid ==
On 31 January 2011, Sapporo and Obihiro was awarded the right to host the Games. The decision was announced at the OCA's general assembly during the 2011 Asian Winter Games in Astana, Kazakhstan. The bid was announced by Mayor Fumio Ueda on 15 January 2011, with no other bidding city. The total cost is expected to be ¥3.5 billion.

== Development and preparation ==
=== Venues ===
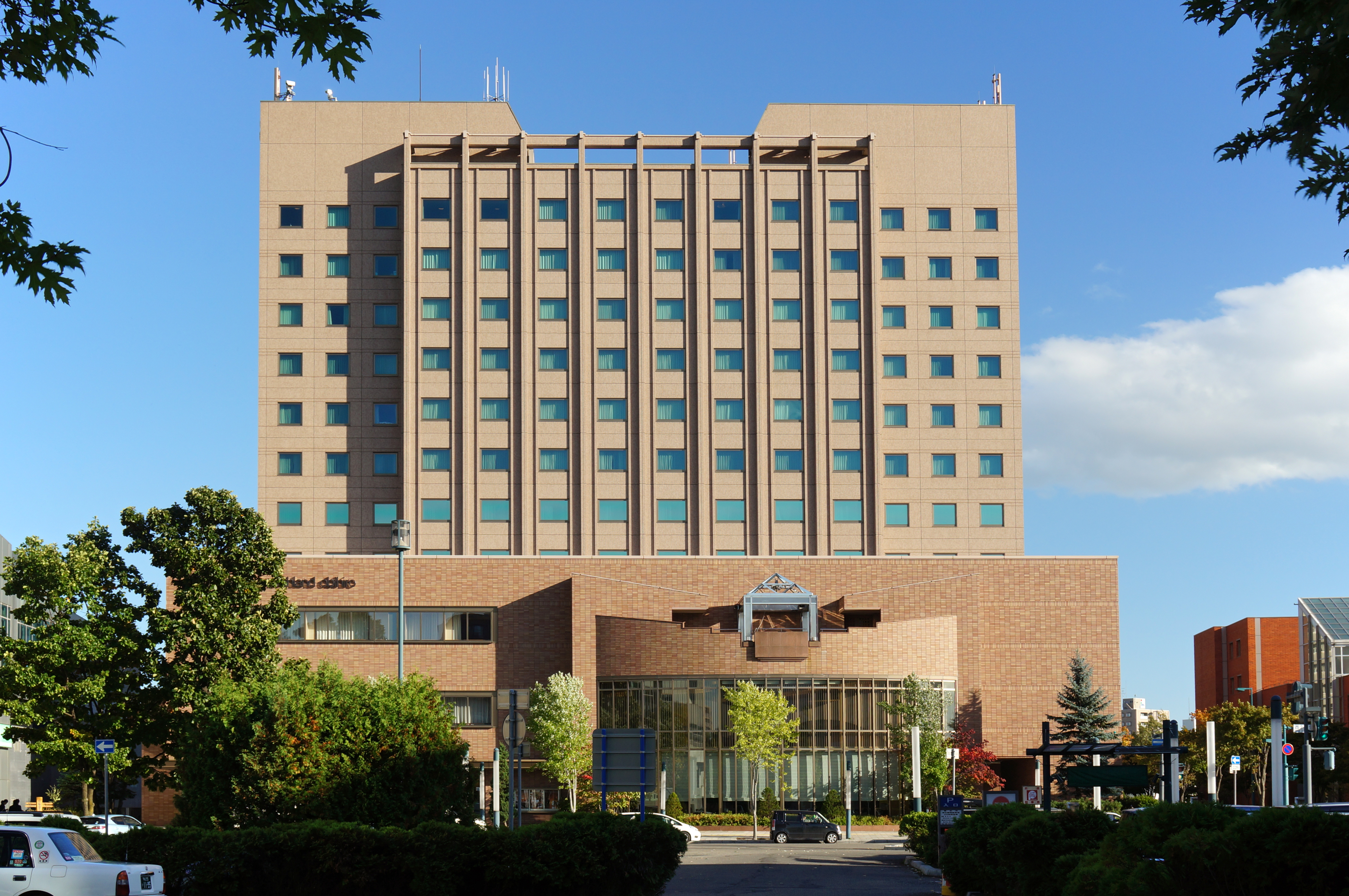
The Hotel Nikko North and Obihiro served as the athlete's village for the speed skating competitors

Athletes village

Athletes and officials staying at the games stayed at hotels in Sapporo and Obihiro (for speed skating). There was no traditional dedicated village that was built for the games.

Main Media Center

The Main Media Center (MMC) housed both the International Broadcasting Center (IBC) and the Main Press Center (MPC). These were housed at the Sapporo Convention Center.

Competition venues

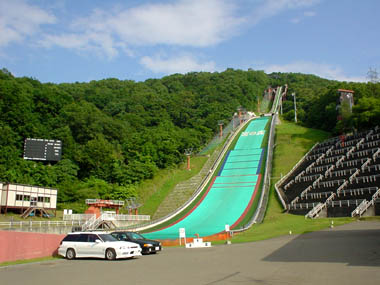
The Miyanomori Stadium hosted part of the ski jumping competition

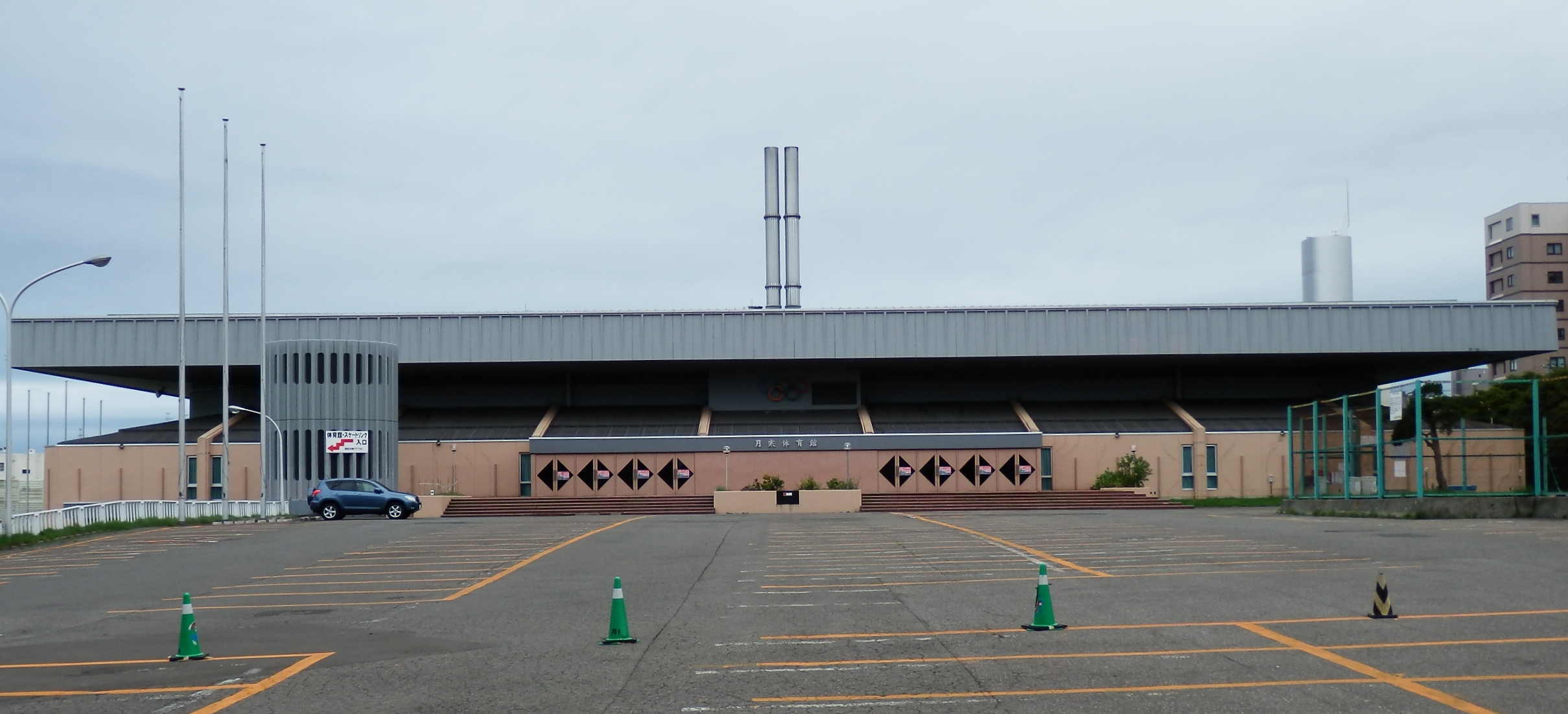
Tsukisamu Gymnasium hosted part of the hockey competitions

A total of 13 venues were scheduled to be used for the games. Some of the venues were also used during the 1972 Winter Olympics. All venues were located within the Sapporo region, except the speed skating venue which was in Obihiro.

Venue	Sports
Sapporo Dome	Opening Ceremony
Okurayama Ski Jump Stadium	Ski Jumping
Miyanomori Ski Jump Stadium	Ski Jumping
Shirahatayama Open Stadium	Cross Country Skiing
Sapporo Teine	Alpine Skiing, Snowboarding
Sapporo Bankei Ski Area	Freestyle Skiing, Snowboarding
Nishioka Biathlon Stadium	Biathlon
Tsukisamu Gymnasium	Ice Hockey
Mikaho Gymnasium	Ice Hockey
Hoshioki Ice Skating Rink	Ice Hockey
Sapporo Curling Stadium	Curling
Obihiro Forest Speed Skating Oval	Speed Skating
Makomanai Ice Arena	Figure Skating, Short Track Speed Skating, Closing Ceremony

=== Medals ===
The medal design was revealed on December 21, 2016. The medals were cut using diamonds and the three stars on them are curved to look like ice. The three stars are meant to represent athletes as "Stars of Hope". The diamond-cut surface is also meant to represent the fresh air in the winter along with the snow and ice seen across Hokkaido. The medals are 55 millimetres (2.2 in) in diameter and 4.5 millimetres (0.18 in) thick. The three kind of medals also weight differently, with the gold (109.1 grams (3.85 oz)) weighing the most, followed by silver (107.1 grams (3.78 oz)) and finally bronze (87.9 grams (3.10 oz)).

=== Tickets ===
The pre-sale of tickets for select events and the opening ceremony started on September 12, 2016, while tickets went on general sale for all events on November 14, 2016. Alpine skiing, freestyle skiing, snowboard parallel events, speed skating and the third division of the men's hockey tournament were free admission. Tickets start around ¥500. The most expensive tickets at ¥9,000 are to the closing ceremony. With a month to go till the start of the games, only 30% of tickets were sold. The only event to be sold out at that time was the men's halfpipe competition in snowboarding, which resulted in more tickets being released for the event.

=== Torch relay ===
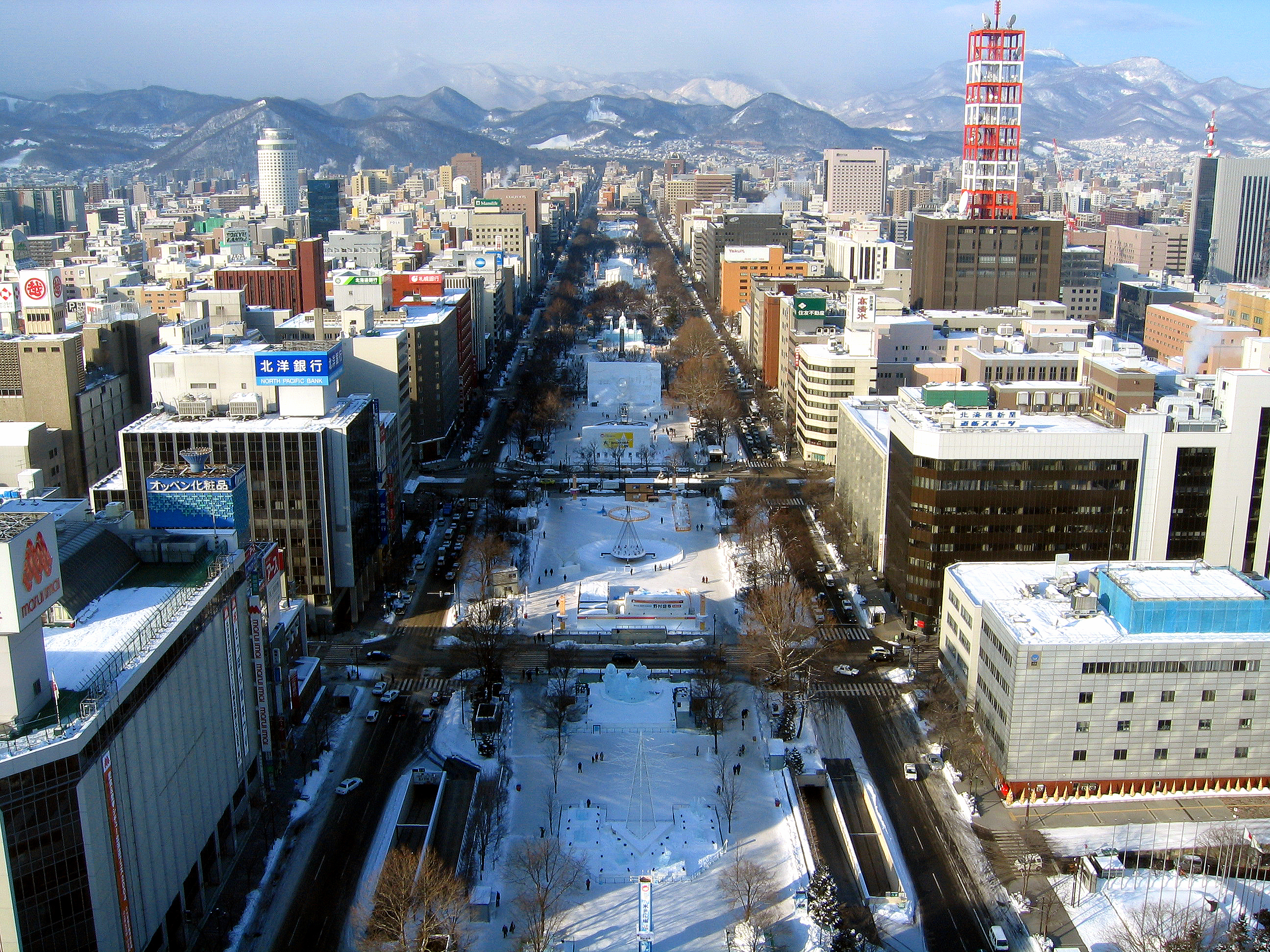
Sapporo's Odori Park hosted the torch lighting ceremony

The torch was lit on February 5 at the Sapporo Snow Festival being held at the Odori Park located in central Sapporo. The ceremony involved a lighting ritual presentation made by the Ainu people, indigenous from Hokkaido island. The relay in itself only lasted one day (on February 6), with the closing of the day seeing the Kamuinomi, which was one of the main rituals of the Ainu people. The ritual involved praying for the success of all the athletes taking part in the games. From February 7 to the 17th, the flame be split and then displayed at the City Halls of both Sapporo and Obihiro, as well as the 10 ward offices of Sapporo. The main cauldron was located in front of Sapporo City Hall, which was also used for the 1972 Winter Olympics torch relay local celebrations, until one hour before the closing ceremony, on February 26, when the main cauldron was relighted.

== The Games ==
=== Opening ceremony ===
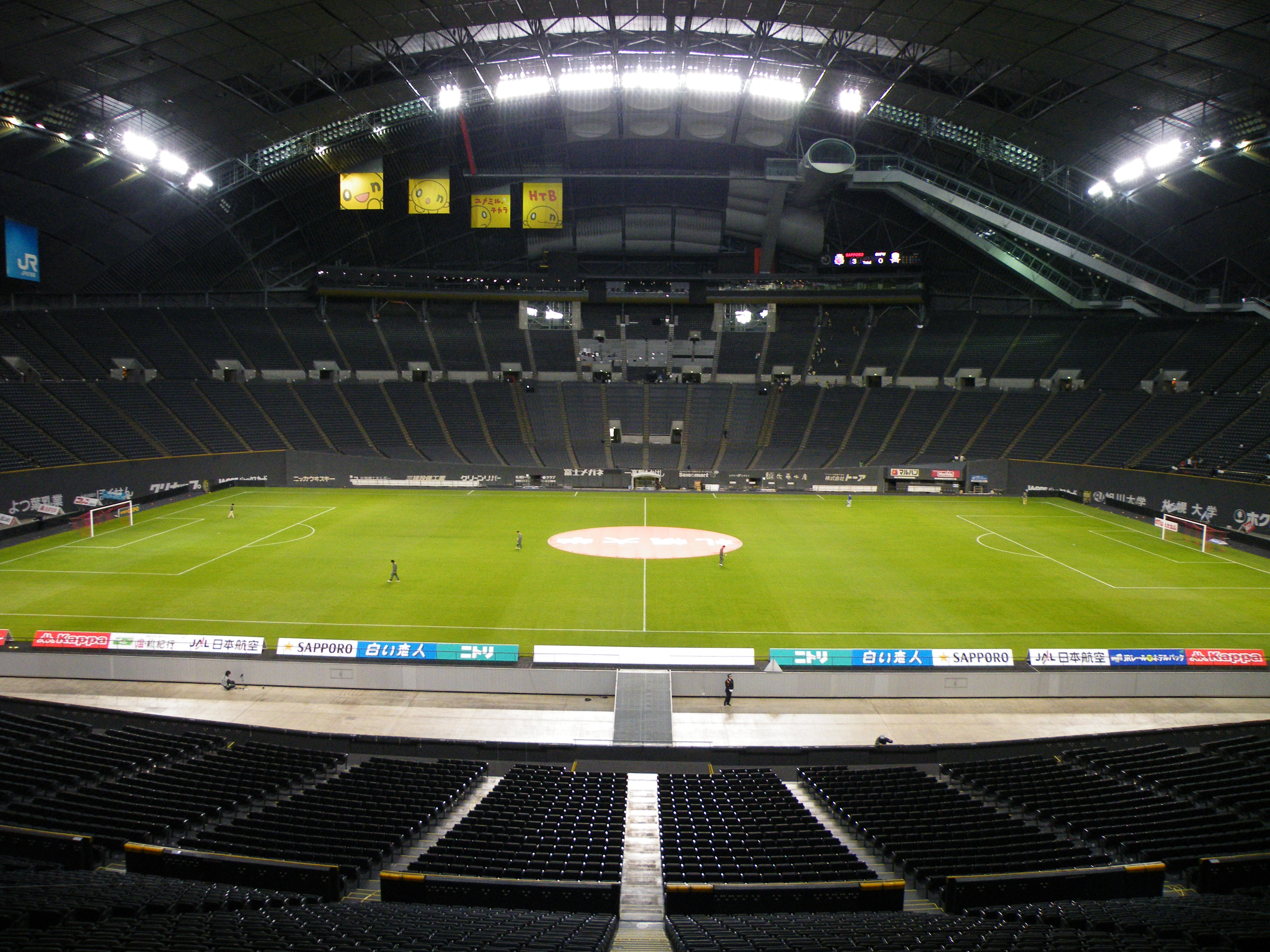
The Sapporo Dome hosted the opening ceremony

The opening ceremony of the games took place on 19 February at the Sapporo Dome. The show included a special performance by Japanese pop band Dreams Come True. In addition to the traditional protocol elements, this ceremony was marked by innovative elements such as the schedule and the holding of two award ceremonies that had to be brought forward due to the Games calendar among the cultural elements that the Ainu people was invited to be part.

=== Closing ceremony ===
The closing ceremony of the games took place on 26 February at the conclusion of the men's event in the figure skating. The ceremony was held at the Makomanai Ice Arena and also included an exhibition gala by some of the figure skaters who took part in competition.

=== Sports ===
64 events across 11 winter sport disciplines, were scheduled in the 2017 Asian Winter Games program. The five ice sports are curling, figure skating, speed skating, short-track speed skating and ice hockey.Present at the 2011 edition:bandy and Ski orienteering were dropped by the Organizing Committee. The five snow sports are alpine, biathlon cross-country, freestyle, ski jumping, and snowboarding. Due to infrastructure issues and also established in the OCA regulations, four sports that are on the program for the Winter Olympics were not part of the program for this edition: bobsleigh, luge, Nordic combined, and skeleton. Numbers in parentheses indicate the number of medal events contested in each sports discipline.

- Alpine skiing (4)
- Biathlon (7)
- Cross-country skiing (10)
- Curling (2)
- Figure skating (4)
- Freestyle skiing (4)
- Ice hockey (2)
- Short-track speed skating (8)
- Ski jumping (3)
- Snowboarding (6)
- Speed skating (14)

== Participating teams ==
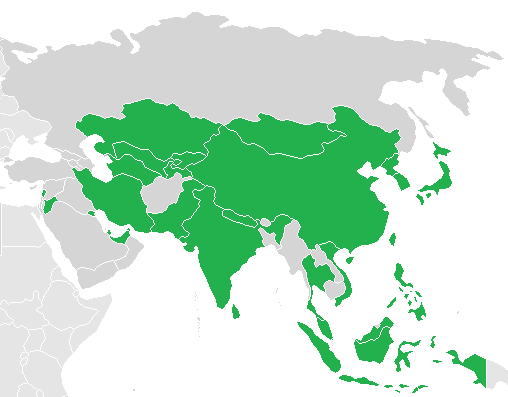
A map of the 30 participating NOCs from Asia. Australia and New Zealand are not shown

32 NOCs (including the two invited Oceania NOCs) competed. Indonesia, Sri Lanka, Timor-Leste, Turkmenistan and Vietnam made their debuts. Three additional countries were scheduled to participate: Afghanistan (did not submit entries by the deadline), Cambodia and Iraq (were not members of the International Skating Union, and thus their application to participate was rejected).

After competing at the last edition of the Games, Afghanistan, Bahrain and Palestine did not compete here. On the other hand, after missing the last edition, both Macau and Pakistan competed here. Bahrain originally entered a men's ice hockey team but later withdrew, after the government did not approve of the expense of sending the team to the games, amidst a drop in oil prices.

In September 2016, it was announced athletes from Oceania were invited to compete. Countries from Oceania are however listed separately as they are not deemed as official competitors, but are considered as invited guest athletes (therefore they are not eligible for medals).

The Kuwait Olympic Committee was suspended in October 2015, due to political interference. Therefore, the athletes from the country competed under the Olympic flag as Independent Olympic Athletes.

The numbers in parentheses represents the number of participants entered.

Participating National Olympic Committees

Olympic Council of Asia members

- China (156)
- Hong Kong (50)
- India (27)
- Indonesia (34)
- Iran (10)
- Japan (146) (hosts)
- Jordan (2)
- Kazakhstan (116)
- North Korea (7)
- South Korea (141)
- Independent Olympic Athletes (23)
- Kyrgyzstan (33)
- Lebanon (8)
- Macau (23)
- Malaysia (36)
- Mongolia (46)
- Nepal (3)
- Pakistan (12)
- Philippines (29)
- Qatar (32)
- Singapore (22)
- Sri Lanka (5)
- Chinese Taipei (41)
- Tajikistan (4)
- Thailand (51)
- Timor-Leste (1)
- Turkmenistan (23)
- United Arab Emirates (24)
- Uzbekistan (1)
- Vietnam (6)

Oceania National Olympic Committees members

- Australia (30)
- New Zealand (3)

== Calendar ==
Competitions started the day before the opening ceremony on the 18th, and ended with the figure skating men's free program and closing ceremony.

OC	Opening ceremony	●	Event competitions	1	Event finals	CC	Closing ceremony

February	18th Sat	19th Sun	20th Mon	21st Tue	22nd Wed	23rd Thu	24th Fri	25th Sat	26th Sun	Events
Ceremonies		OC							CC	
Alpine skiing					1	1		2		4
Biathlon						2	2	1	2	7
Cross-country skiing			2	2		2	2		2	10
Curling	●	●	●	●	●	●	2			2
Figure skating						●	1	2	1	4
Freestyle skiing							2		2	4
Ice hockey	●		●	●	●	●	●	1	1	2
Short-track speed skating			2	2	4					8
Ski jumping				1			1	1		3
Snowboarding		2	2					2		6
Speed skating			4	4	3	3				14
Total events	0	2	10	9	8	8	10	9	8	64
Cumulative total	0	2	12	21	29	37	47	56	64	64
February	18th Sat	19th Sun	20th Mon	21st Tue	22nd Wed	23rd Thu	24th Fri	25th Sat	26th Sun	Events

== Medal table ==
* Host nation (Japan)

Rank	Nation	Gold	Silver	Bronze	Total
1	Japan*	27	21	26	74
2	South Korea	16	18	16	50
3	China	12	14	9	35
4	Kazakhstan	9	11	12	32
5	North Korea	0	0	1	1
Totals (5 entries)		64	64	64	192

== Marketing ==
=== Mascot ===
Ezomon, the official mascot.

The official mascot of the 2017 Asian Winter Games is named Ezomon. Ezomon is modeled after a flying squirrel species only found in the Hokkaido region of Japan. Ezomon sports a red scarf and a blue cape with the logo of the 2017 Asian Winter Games on it.

=== Corporate sponsorship ===
Sponsors of the 2017 Asian Winter Games
Gold Partners
- Nippon Telegraph and Telephone
- NTT DoCoMo
Official Partners
- ALSOK
- Seiko
Official Sponsors
- Aktio
- All Nippon Airways
- E.C Pro
- Fuji Xerox
- Hokkaido Gas
- Japan Airlines
- Kanamoto
- Kamori Kankō
- Mizuno
- Sapporo Bankei
- Secom
- Tokio Marine Nichido
- Toppan Forms
Hokkaido Regional Local Supporters
- Hokkaido Bank
- Panasonic System Networks
- Toppan
- Yamato Holdings

== Concerns and controversies ==
=== APA Hotel ===
One of the athletes hotels is the APA Hotel in Sapporo. The founder and president of this hotel chain, Toshio Motoya, who is a strong supporter of political and historical view aligned with those of Japan's right wing. For example, Motoya claimed that "Japanese aggression, the Nanking Massacre, and comfort women" were "fabricated stories" or "fictitious". His book is available in each of the guest rooms at the hotel. This created controversy, particularly in China, which caused the games organizers to ask the hotel to take appropriate actions and remove them from guest rooms. The Organizing Committee will gain exclusive access over the hotel from February 12, and an organization committee official said, "we can decide what is removed and placed in the guest rooms so that we don't place any items that offend athletes, from not only China, but also any other nation". Eventually both South Korea and China requested that their athletes stay at a different hotel, and the organizing committee obliged by changing their accommodations to the Sapporo Prince Hotel.

=== Scheduling ===
This event is being held around World and other major championships of some of the sports being contested. Included in this is the FIS Alpine World Ski Championships 2017 being held in St. Moritz, Switzerland, till 19 February (the opening of the games). Due to this some teams including among others Lebanon, have decided to not send their best team. The FIS Nordic World Ski Championships 2017 in Lahti, Finland will also happen during the games (between February 22 and March 5) which has caused Iran to not send a cross-country skiing team at all. Also, the reason cited for low ticket sales, is that many top athletes chose to focus on the world championships of their various disciplines.

Preceded by Astana and Almaty	Asian Winter Games; Sapporo; VIII Asian Winter Games (2017)	Succeeded by Harbin
