= Speed skating at the 2017 Asian Winter Games =

- Venue: Meiji Hokkaido-Tokachi Oval
- Dates: 20–23 February 2017
- Competitors: 78 from 10 nations

Speed skating at the 2017 Asian Winter Games was held in Obihiro, Japan between 19–23 February at Meiji Hokkaido-Tokachi Oval. A total of 14 events (seven for each gender) were held.

== Schedule ==
F	Final

Event↓/Date →	20th Mon	21st Tue	22nd Wed	23rd Thu
Men's 500 m	F			
Men's 1000 m		F		
Men's 1500 m				F
Men's 5000 m	F			
Men's 10000 m			F	
Men's mass start				F
Men's team pursuit			F	
Women's 500 m		F		
Women's 1000 m	F			
Women's 1500 m		F		
Women's 3000 m	F			
Women's 5000 m			F	
Women's mass start				F
Women's team pursuit		F		

== Medalists ==
=== Men ===
Event	Gold	Silver	Bronze
500 m	Gao Tingyu; China	Tsubasa Hasegawa; Japan	Cha Min-kyu; South Korea
1000 m	Takuro Oda; Japan	Denis Kuzin; Kazakhstan	Shunsuke Nakamura; Japan
1500 m	Kim Min-seok; South Korea	Takuro Oda; Japan	Taro Kondo; Japan
5000 m	Lee Seung-hoon; South Korea	Ryosuke Tsuchiya; Japan	Seitaro Ichinohe; Japan
10000 m	Lee Seung-hoon; South Korea	Ryosuke Tsuchiya; Japan	Seitaro Ichinohe; Japan
Mass start	Lee Seung-hoon; South Korea	Shane Williamson; Japan	Kim Min-seok; South Korea
Team pursuit	South Korea; Joo Hyong-jun; Kim Min-seok; Lee Seung-hoon	Japan; Shota Nakamura; Shane Williamson; Ryosuke Tsuchiya	Kazakhstan; Dmitriy Babenko; Denis Kuzin; Fyodor Mezentsev

=== Women ===
Event	Gold	Silver	Bronze
500 m	Nao Kodaira; Japan	Lee Sang-hwa; South Korea	Arisa Go; Japan
1000 m	Nao Kodaira; Japan	Miho Takagi; Japan	Zhang Hong; China
1500 m	Miho Takagi; Japan	Misaki Oshigiri; Japan	Zhang Hong; China
3000 m	Miho Takagi; Japan	Kim Bo-reum; South Korea	Ayano Sato; Japan
5000 m	Kim Bo-reum; South Korea	Han Mei; China	Mai Kiyama; Japan
Mass start	Miho Takagi; Japan	Ayano Sato; Japan	Kim Bo-reum; South Korea
Team pursuit	Japan; Misaki Oshigiri; Nana Takagi; Ayano Sato	South Korea; Park Ji-woo; Noh Seon-yeong; Kim Bo-reum	China; Zhao Xin; Liu Jing; Han Mei

== Medal table ==
Rank	Nation	Gold	Silver	Bronze	Total
1	Japan (JPN)	7	9	7	23
2	South Korea (KOR)	6	3	3	12
3	China (CHN)	1	1	3	5
4	Kazakhstan (KAZ)	0	1	1	2
Totals (4 entries)		14	14	14	42

== Participating nations ==
A total of 78 athletes from 10 nations competed in speed skating at the 2017 Asian Winter Games:

- Australia (1)
- China (20)
- Chinese Taipei (1)
- India (3)
- Japan (19)
- Kazakhstan (10)
- Mongolia (4)
- New Zealand (1)
- South Korea (18)
- Thailand (1)

* Australia and New Zealand as guest nations, were ineligible to win any medals.
