= Speed skating at the 2017 Asian Winter Games – Men's 1000 metres =

Men's 1000 metres at the 2017 Asian Winter Games
- Venue: Meiji Hokkaido-Tokachi Oval
- Dates: 21 February 2017
- Competitors: 22 from 8 nations

Medalists
gold medal	Takuro Oda	Japan
silver medal	Denis Kuzin	Kazakhstan
bronze medal	Shunsuke Nakamura	Japan

The men's 1000 metres at the 2017 Asian Winter Games was held on February 21, 2017 in Obihiro, Japan.

== Schedule ==
All times are Japan Standard Time (UTC+09:00)

Date	Time	Event
Tuesday, 21 February 2017	13:50	Final

== Records ==
Prior to this competition, the existing world and Games records were as follows.

World Record	Shani Davis (USA)	1:06.42	Salt Lake City, United States	7 March 2009
Games Record	Lee Kyou-hyuk (KOR)	1:09.86	Changchun, China	1 February 2007

== Results ==
Legend

- DNF — Did not finish

Rank	Pair	Athlete	Time	Notes
1st place, gold medalist(s)	9	Takuro Oda (JPN)	1:09.33	GR
2nd place, silver medalist(s)	7	Denis Kuzin (KAZ)	1:09.64	
3rd place, bronze medalist(s)	6	Shunsuke Nakamura (JPN)	1:09.76	
4	7	Tsubasa Hasegawa (JPN)	1:10.21	
5	9	Jang Won-hoon (KOR)	1:10.31	
6	11	Cha Min-kyu (KOR)	1:10.51	
7	3	Mo Tae-bum (KOR)	1:10.80	
8	4	Stanislav Palkin (KAZ)	1:10.91	
9	10	Yuto Fujino (JPN)	1:10.98	
10	5	Roman Krech (KAZ)	1:11.08	
11	1	Li Bailin (CHN)	1:11.32	
12	8	Fyodor Mezentsev (KAZ)	1:11.36	
13	6	Yang Fan (CHN)	1:11.71	
14	8	Gao Tingyu (CHN)	1:11.83	
15	11	Li Yanzhe (CHN)	1:12.33	
16	5	Sung Ching-yang (TPE)	1:12.46	
17	4	Yalaltyn Zorigtbaatar (MGL)	1:14.90	
18	3	Stephen Paul Kilari (IND)	1:15.75	
19	1	Dünchinsürengiin Gochoosüren (MGL)	1:17.40	
20	2	Vishwaraj Jadeja (IND)	1:22.55	
21	2	Sasha Faris (NZL)	1:24.24	
—	10	Kim Jin-su (KOR)	DNF	
