= Speed skating at the 2017 Asian Winter Games – Men's 1500 metres =

Men's 1500 metres at the 2017 Asian Winter Games
- Venue: Meiji Hokkaido-Tokachi Oval
- Dates: 23 February 2017
- Competitors: 20 from 7 nations

Medalists
| gold medal | Kim Min-seok | South Korea |
| silver medal | Takuro Oda | Japan |
| bronze medal | Taro Kondo | Japan |

The men's 1500 metres at the 2017 Asian Winter Games was held on February 23, 2017 in Obihiro, Japan.

== Schedule ==
All times are Japan Standard Time (UTC+09:00)

| Date | Time | Event |
|---|---|---|
| Thursday, 23 February 2017 | 13:00 | Final |

== Records ==
Prior to this competition, the existing world and Games records were as follows.

| World Record | Shani Davis (USA) | 1:41.04 | Salt Lake City, United States | 11 December 2009 |
| Games Record | Denis Kuzin (KAZ) | 1:47.37 | Astana, Kazakhstan | 4 February 2011 |

== Results ==
| Rank | Pair | Athlete | Time | Notes |
|---|---|---|---|---|
| 1st place, gold medalist(s) | 8 | Kim Min-seok (KOR) | 1:46.26 | GR |
| 2nd place, silver medalist(s) | 5 | Takuro Oda (JPN) | 1:46.76 | |
| 3rd place, bronze medalist(s) | 10 | Taro Kondo (JPN) | 1:47.88 | |
| 4 | 9 | Shota Nakamura (JPN) | 1:47.91 | |
| 5 | 9 | Kim Jin-su (KOR) | 1:47.98 | |
| 6 | 7 | Shane Williamson (JPN) | 1:48.17 | |
| 7 | 4 | Joo Hyong-jun (KOR) | 1:48.26 | |
| 8 | 7 | Kim Cheol-min (KOR) | 1:48.72 | |
| 9 | 6 | Denis Kuzin (KAZ) | 1:49.15 | |
| 10 | 4 | Fyodor Mezentsev (KAZ) | 1:49.23 | |
| 11 | 8 | Li Bailin (CHN) | 1:49.56 | |
| 12 | 6 | Wu Yu (CHN) | 1:50.76 | |
| 13 | 3 | Stanislav Palkin (KAZ) | 1:51.14 | |
| 14 | 10 | Liu Yiming (CHN) | 1:51.19 | |
| 15 | 5 | Rehanbai Talabuhan (CHN) | 1:52.58 | |
| 16 | 2 | Yalaltyn Zorigtbaatar (MGL) | 1:56.77 | |
| 17 | 2 | Stephen Paul Kilari (IND) | 2:01.32 | |
| 18 | 1 | Dünchinsürengiin Gochoosüren (MGL) | 2:03.07 | |
| 19 | 1 | Vishwaraj Jadeja (IND) | 2:08.48 | |
| 20 | 3 | Sasha Faris (NZL) | 2:11.03 | |
