= Speed skating at the 2017 Asian Winter Games – Men's 500 metres =

Men's 500 metres at the 2017 Asian Winter Games
- Venue: Meiji Hokkaido-Tokachi Oval
- Dates: 20 February 2017
- Competitors: 21 from 8 nations

Medalists
gold medal	Gao Tingyu	China
silver medal	Tsubasa Hasegawa	Japan
bronze medal	Cha Min-kyu	South Korea

The men's 500 metres at the 2017 Asian Winter Games was held on February 20, 2017 in Obihiro, Japan.

== Schedule ==
All times are Japan Standard Time (UTC+09:00)

Date	Time	Event
Monday, 20 February 2017	13:00	Final

== Records ==
Prior to this competition, the existing world and Games records were as follows.

World Record	Pavel Kulizhnikov (RUS)	33.98	Salt Lake City, United States	20 November 2015
Games Record	Joji Kato (JPN)	34.98	Astana, Kazakhstan	1 February 2011

== Results ==
Rank	Pair	Athlete	Time	Notes
1st place, gold medalist(s)	9	Gao Tingyu (CHN)	34.69	GR
2nd place, silver medalist(s)	9	Tsubasa Hasegawa (JPN)	34.79	
3rd place, bronze medalist(s)	11	Cha Min-kyu (KOR)	34.94	
4	11	Roman Krech (KAZ)	35.27	
5	8	Mo Tae-bum (KOR)	35.28	
6	7	Shunsuke Nakamura (JPN)	35.29	
7	8	Xie Jiaxuan (CHN)	35.56	
8	5	Jang Won-hoon (KOR)	35.61	
9	10	Sung Ching-yang (TPE)	35.74	
10	4	Yuto Fujino (JPN)	35.87	
11	7	Li Yanzhe (CHN)	35.95	
12	3	Stanislav Palkin (KAZ)	35.99	
13	5	Fyodor Mezentsev (KAZ)	36.02	
14	6	Artyom Krikunov (KAZ)	36.03	
15	6	Mu Zhongsheng (CHN)	36.04	
16	3	Yalaltyn Zorigtbaatar (MGL)	37.73	
17	4	Stephen Paul Kilari (IND)	38.03	
18	1	Dünchinsürengiin Gochoosüren (MGL)	39.17	
19	2	Vishwaraj Jadeja (IND)	41.24	
20	2	Sasha Faris (NZL)	42.12	
21	10	Yuma Murakami (JPN)	1:11.95	
