= Speed skating at the 2017 Asian Winter Games – Men's mass start =

Men's mass start at the 2017 Asian Winter Games
- Venue: Meiji Hokkaido-Tokachi Oval
- Dates: 23 February 2017
- Competitors: 11 from 5 nations

Medalists
gold medal	Lee Seung-hoon	South Korea
silver medal	Shane Williamson	Japan
bronze medal	Kim Min-seok	South Korea

The men's mass start at the 2017 Asian Winter Games was held on 23 February 2017 in Obihiro, Japan.

== Schedule ==
All times are Japan Standard Time (UTC+09:00)

Date	Time	Event
Thursday, 23 February 2017	14:44	Final

== Results ==
Legend

- DNF — Did not finish
- DSQ — Disqualified

Rank	Athlete	Sprint				Total	Time
Rank	Athlete	1	2	3	4	Total	Time
1st place, gold medalist(s)	Lee Seung-hoon (KOR)	1			60	61	8:12.72
2nd place, silver medalist(s)	Shane Williamson (JPN)				40	40	8:13.25
3rd place, bronze medalist(s)	Kim Min-seok (KOR)		1	1	20	22	8:13.69
4	Lee Jin-yeong (KOR)	3	5	3		11	8:50.73
5	Ryosuke Tsuchiya (JPN)	5		5		10	8:24.62
6	Shota Nakamura (JPN)		3			3	8:24.16
7	Yang Fan (CHN)	1				1	8:15.55
8	Dmitriy Babenko (KAZ)					0	8:14.62
9	Rehanbai Talabuhan (CHN)					0	8:23.12
10	Liu Yiming (CHN)					DNF	
—	Vishwaraj Jadeja (IND)					DSQ	
