= Speed skating at the 2017 Asian Winter Games – Women's 1500 metres =

Women's 1500 metres at the 2017 Asian Winter Games
- Venue: Meiji Hokkaido-Tokachi Oval
- Dates: 21 February 2017
- Competitors: 17 from 6 nations

Medalists
gold medal	Miho Takagi	Japan
silver medal	Misaki Oshigiri	Japan
bronze medal	Zhang Hong	China

The women's 1500 metres at the 2017 Asian Winter Games was held on February 21, 2017 in Obihiro, Japan.

== Schedule ==
All times are Japan Standard Time (UTC+09:00)

Date	Time	Event
Tuesday, 21 February 2017	13:00	Final

== Records ==
Prior to this competition, the existing world and Games records were as follows.

World Record	Heather Bergsma (USA)	1:50.85	Salt Lake City, United States	21 November 2015
Games Record	Wang Fei (CHN)	1:58.37	Astana, Kazakhstan	4 February 2011

== Results ==
Rank	Pair	Athlete	Time	Notes
1st place, gold medalist(s)	7	Miho Takagi (JPN)	1:56.07	GR
2nd place, silver medalist(s)	8	Misaki Oshigiri (JPN)	1:58.13	
3	5	Nana Takagi (JPN)	1:59.45	
4	4	Ayano Sato (JPN)	1:59.77	
3rd place, bronze medalist(s)	9	Zhang Hong (CHN)	2:00.14	
6	7	Liu Jing (CHN)	2:01.26	
7	6	Noh Seon-yeong (KOR)	2:01.69	
8	9	Han Mei (CHN)	2:01.76	
9	4	Yekaterina Aydova (KAZ)	2:01.78	
10	5	Park Ji-woo (KOR)	2:01.83	
11	3	Jang Su-ji (KOR)	2:02.37	
12	8	Zhan Xue (CHN)	2:03.67	
13	6	Yelena Urvantseva (KAZ)	2:06.73	
14	2	Mariya Sizova (KAZ)	2:08.74	
15	3	Nadezhda Sidelnik (KAZ)	2:14.61	
16	2	Buyantogtokhyn Sumiyaa (MGL)	2:18.25	
17	1	Shruti Kotwal (IND)	2:42.48	

- Zhang Hong was awarded bronze because of no three-medal sweep per country rule.
