= Speed skating at the 2017 Asian Winter Games – Men's team pursuit =

Men's team pursuit at the 2017 Asian Winter Games
- Venue: Meiji Hokkaido-Tokachi Oval
- Dates: 22 February 2017
- Competitors: 12 from 4 nations

Medalists
gold medal	South Korea; Joo Hyong-jun, Kim Min-seok, Lee Seung-hoon
silver medal	Japan; Shota Nakamura, Shane Williamson, Ryosuke Tsuchiya
bronze medal	Kazakhstan; Dmitriy Babenko, Denis Kuzin, Fyodor Mezentsev

The men's team pursuit at the 2017 Asian Winter Games was held on 22 February 2017 in Obihiro, Japan.

== Schedule ==
All times are Japan Standard Time (UTC+09:00)

Date	Time	Event
Wednesday, 22 February 2017	15:55	Final

== Records ==
Prior to this competition, the existing world and Games records were as follows.

World Record	Netherlands	3:35.60	Salt Lake City, United States	16 November 2013
Games Record	Japan	3:49.18	Astana, Kazakhstan	6 February 2011

== Results ==
Rank	Pair	Team	Time	Notes
1st place, gold medalist(s)	2	South Korea (KOR); Joo Hyong-jun; Kim Min-seok; Lee Seung-hoon	3:44.32	GR
2nd place, silver medalist(s)	1	Japan (JPN); Shota Nakamura; Shane Williamson; Ryosuke Tsuchiya	3:45.93	
3rd place, bronze medalist(s)	2	Kazakhstan (KAZ); Dmitriy Babenko; Denis Kuzin; Fyodor Mezentsev	3:59.37	
4	1	China (CHN); Liu Yiming; Rehanbai Talabuhan; Zhu Jiafan	4:03.20	
