= Speed skating at the 2017 Asian Winter Games – Women's 500 metres =

Women's 500 metres at the 2017 Asian Winter Games
- Venue: Meiji Hokkaido-Tokachi Oval
- Dates: 21 February 2017
- Competitors: 17 from 7 nations

Medalists
gold medal	Nao Kodaira	Japan
silver medal	Lee Sang-hwa	South Korea
bronze medal	Arisa Go	Japan

The women's 500 metres at the 2017 Asian Winter Games was held on February 21, 2017, in Obihiro, Japan.

== Schedule ==
All times are Japan Standard Time (UTC+09:00)

Date	Time	Event
Tuesday, 21 February 2017	14:44	Final

== Records ==
Prior to this competition, the existing world and Games records were as follows.

World Record	Lee Sang-hwa (KOR)	36.36	Salt Lake City, United States	16 November 2013
Games Record	Yu Jing (CHN)	37.85	Astana, Kazakhstan	1 February 2011

== Results ==
Rank	Pair	Athlete	Time	Notes
1st place, gold medalist(s)	7	Nao Kodaira (JPN)	37.39	GR
2nd place, silver medalist(s)	7	Lee Sang-hwa (KOR)	37.70	
3rd place, bronze medalist(s)	8	Arisa Go (JPN)	37.735	
4	8	Yu Jing (CHN)	37.738	
5	9	Zhang Hong (CHN)	38.13	
6	9	Maki Tsuji (JPN)	38.19	
7	5	Kim Min-sun (KOR)	38.46	
8	6	Yekaterina Aydova (KAZ)	38.49	
9	4	Park Seung-hi (KOR)	38.63	
10	6	Kim Hyun-yung (KOR)	38.88	
11	5	Zhao Xin (CHN)	39.58	
12	4	Shi Xiaoxuan (CHN)	39.65	
13	3	Mariya Sizova (KAZ)	42.02	
14	2	Altan-Ochiryn Zul (MGL)	42.22	
15	3	Buyantogtokhyn Sumiyaa (MGL)	43.72	
16	2	Shruti Kotwal (IND)	45.51	
17	1	Natalie Hognestad (THA)	48.26	
