= Speed skating at the 2017 Asian Winter Games – Men's 5000 metres =

Men's 5000 metres at the 2017 Asian Winter Games
- Venue: Meiji Hokkaido-Tokachi Oval
- Dates: 20 February 2017
- Competitors: 11 from 6 nations

Medalists
gold medal	Lee Seung-hoon	South Korea
silver medal	Ryosuke Tsuchiya	Japan
bronze medal	Seitaro Ichinohe	Japan

The men's 5000 metres at the 2017 Asian Winter Games was held on 20 February 2017 in Obihiro, Japan.

== Schedule ==
All times are Japan Standard Time (UTC+09:00)

Date	Time	Event
Monday, 20 February 2017	14:35	Final

== Records ==
Prior to this competition, the existing world and Games records were as follows.

World Record	Sven Kramer (NED)	6:03.32	Calgary, Canada	17 November 2007
Games Record	Lee Seung-hoon (KOR)	6:25.56	Astana, Kazakhstan	31 January 2011

== Results ==
Rank	Pair	Athlete	Time	Notes
1st place, gold medalist(s)	4	Lee Seung-hoon (KOR)	6:24.32	GR
2nd place, silver medalist(s)	5	Ryosuke Tsuchiya (JPN)	6:29.67	
3rd place, bronze medalist(s)	4	Seitaro Ichinohe (JPN)	6:31.84	
4	3	Joo Hyong-jun (KOR)	6:40.26	
5	5	Dmitriy Babenko (KAZ)	6:41.17	
6	6	Shane Williamson (JPN)	6:41.76	
7	2	Josh Capponi (AUS)	6:48.37	
8	2	Wu Yu (CHN)	6:48.38	
9	6	Liu Yiming (CHN)	6:50.60	
10	3	Rehanbai Talabuhan (CHN)	6:55.90	
11	1	Vishwaraj Jadeja (IND)	7:44.31	
