= Speed skating at the 2017 Asian Winter Games – Women's 1000 metres =

Women's 1000 metres at the 2017 Asian Winter Games
- Venue: Meiji Hokkaido-Tokachi Oval
- Dates: 20 February 2017
- Competitors: 18 from 7 nations

Medalists
gold medal	Nao Kodaira	Japan
silver medal	Miho Takagi	Japan
bronze medal	Zhang Hong	China

The women's 1000 metres at the 2017 Asian Winter Games was held on February 20, 2017 in Obihiro, Japan.

== Schedule ==
All times are Japan Standard Time (UTC+09:00)

Date	Time	Event
Monday, 20 February 2017	13:45	Final

== Records ==
Prior to this competition, the existing world and Games records were as follows.

World Record	Brittany Bowe (USA)	1:12.18	Salt Lake City, United States	22 November 2015
Games Record	Wang Beixing (CHN)	1:17.35	Changchun, China	1 February 2007

== Results ==
Rank	Pair	Athlete	Time	Notes
1st place, gold medalist(s)	8	Nao Kodaira (JPN)	1:15.19	GR
2nd place, silver medalist(s)	7	Miho Takagi (JPN)	1:15.31	
3rd place, bronze medalist(s)	7	Zhang Hong (CHN)	1:15.75	
4	5	Lee Sang-hwa (KOR)	1:16.01	
5	9	Arisa Go (JPN)	1:16.18	
6	4	Park Seung-hi (KOR)	1:16.82	
7	5	Li Qishi (CHN)	1:16.89	
8	4	Yekaterina Aydova (KAZ)	1:17.20	
9	8	Yu Jing (CHN)	1:17.24	
10	9	Maki Tsuji (JPN)	1:17.60	
11	6	Kim Hyun-yung (KOR)	1:17.99	
12	6	Zhan Xue (CHN)	1:19.05	
13	1	Kim Min-sun (KOR)	1:19.09	
14	2	Mariya Sizova (KAZ)	1:24.06	
15	1	Altan-Ochiryn Zul (MGL)	1:26.74	
16	3	Buyantogtokhyn Sumiyaa (MGL)	1:28.06	
17	2	Shruti Kotwal (IND)	1:35.99	
18	3	Natalie Hognestad (THA)	1:37.74	
