= Speed skating at the 2017 Asian Winter Games – Women's 5000 metres =

Women's 5000 metres at the 2017 Asian Winter Games
- Venue: Meiji Hokkaido-Tokachi Oval
- Dates: 22 February 2017
- Competitors: 7 from 4 nations

Medalists
gold medal	Kim Bo-reum	South Korea
silver medal	Han Mei	China
bronze medal	Mai Kiyama	Japan

The women's 5000 metres at the 2017 Asian Winter Games was held on February 22, 2017 in Obihiro, Japan.

== Schedule ==
All times are Japan Standard Time (UTC+09:00)

Date	Time	Event
Wednesday, 22 February 2017	14:45	Final

== Records ==
Prior to this competition, the existing world and Games records were as follows.

World Record	Martina Sáblíková (CZE)	6:42.66	Salt Lake City, United States	18 February 2011
Games Record	Masako Hozumi (JPN)	7:09.23	Astana, Kazakhstan	5 February 2011

== Results ==
Rank	Pair	Athlete	Time	Notes
1st place, gold medalist(s)	3	Kim Bo-reum (KOR)	7:12.58	
2nd place, silver medalist(s)	3	Han Mei (CHN)	7:15.94	
3rd place, bronze medalist(s)	2	Mai Kiyama (JPN)	7:16.24	
4	4	Maki Tabata (JPN)	7:23.21	
5	4	Park Do-yeong (KOR)	7:28.09	
6	2	Guo Dan (CHN)	7:37.90	
7	1	Yelena Urvantseva (KAZ)	7:56.60	
