= Curling at the 2017 Asian Winter Games – Men's team =

Men's team at the 2017 Asian Winter Games
- Venue: Sapporo Curling Stadium
- Dates: 18–24 February 2017
- Competitors: 29 from 6 nations

Medalists
gold medal	China; Liu Rui, Xu Xiaoming, Ba Dexin, Zang Jialiang, Zou Qiang
silver medal	Japan; Yusuke Morozumi, Tetsuro Shimizu, Tsuyoshi Yamaguchi, Kosuke Morozumi, Kosuke Hirata
bronze medal	South Korea; Kim Soo-hyuk, Park Jong-duk, Kim Tae-hwan, Nam Yoon-ho, Yoo Min-hyeon

The men's curling tournament at the 2017 Asian Winter Games was held in Sapporo, Japan between 18 and 24 February at Sapporo Curling Stadium. Curling returns to the competition schedule after missing out at the last edition of the games in 2011.

A total of six teams contested the men's curling competition.

== Squads ==
China	Chinese Taipei	Japan	Kazakhstan
Liu Rui; Xu Xiaoming; Ba Dexin; Zang Jialiang; Zou Qiang	Randolph Shen; Nicholas Hsu; Brendon Liu; Lin Ting-li; Steve Koo	Yusuke Morozumi; Tetsuro Shimizu; Tsuyoshi Yamaguchi; Kosuke Morozumi; Kosuke Hirata	Viktor Kim; Abylaikhan Zhuzbay; Dmitriy Garagul; Muzdybay Kudaibergenov; Abilay Nurumbetov
Qatar	South Korea		
Nabeel Al-Yafei; Ahmed Al-Fahad; Jaber Al-Ozali; Ahmad Khashabi	Kim Soo-hyuk; Park Jong-duk; Kim Tae-hwan; Nam Yoon-ho; Yoo Min-hyeon		

== Results ==
All times are Japan Standard Time (UTC+09:00)

=== Round robin ===
Pos	Team	Skip	Pld	W	L	W–L	PF	PA	Qualification
1	China	Liu Rui	5	5	0	—	50	18	Semifinals
2	South Korea	Kim Soo-hyuk	5	4	1	—	50	16	Semifinals
3	Japan	Yusuke Morozumi	5	3	2	—	53	25	Semifinals
4	Chinese Taipei	Randolph Shen	5	2	3	—	36	28	Semifinals
5	Kazakhstan	Viktor Kim	5	1	4	—	20	54	
6	Qatar	Nabeel Al-Yafei	5	0	5	—	11	79	

Source: OCA

18 February, 9:00

Sheet A	1	2	3	4	5	6	7	8	9	10	Final
Chinese Taipei	1	0	1	0	0	1	0	X	X	X	3
Japan 🔨	0	2	0	0	6	0	3	X	X	X	11

Sheet B	1	2	3	4	5	6	7	8	9	10	Final
China 🔨	1	2	1	3	2	3	0	1	1	X	12
Kazakhstan	0	0	0	0	0	0	1	0	0	X	1

Sheet C	1	2	3	4	5	6	7	8	9	10	Final
Qatar	0	0	0	0	0	0	0	X	X	X	0
South Korea 🔨	3	3	3	3	3	2	3	X	X	X	20

18 February, 18:00

Sheet A	1	2	3	4	5	6	7	8	9	10	Final
South Korea	2	0	1	1	0	3	3	2	X	X	12
Kazakhstan 🔨	0	1	0	0	0	0	0	0	X	X	1

Sheet B	1	2	3	4	5	6	7	8	9	10	Final
Japan 🔨	1	2	4	3	4	5	0	X	X	X	19
Qatar	0	0	0	0	0	0	1	X	X	X	1

19 February, 9:00

Sheet C	1	2	3	4	5	6	7	8	9	10	Final
China 🔨	1	0	0	0	1	1	1	0	3	X	7
Chinese Taipei	0	0	2	0	0	0	0	1	0	X	3

20 February, 13:30

Sheet A	1	2	3	4	5	6	7	8	9	10	Final
China 🔨	2	0	2	1	0	0	1	0	2	1	9
Japan	0	2	0	0	1	1	0	2	0	0	6

Sheet B	1	2	3	4	5	6	7	8	9	10	Final
Chinese Taipei	0	0	0	0	2	0	0	1	0	0	3
South Korea 🔨	0	0	2	0	0	0	2	0	1	2	7

Sheet C	1	2	3	4	5	6	7	8	9	10	Final
Qatar 🔨	0	0	1	1	0	1	0	1	0	0	4
Kazakhstan	0	1	0	0	4	0	2	0	4	1	12

21 February, 9:00

Sheet A	1	2	3	4	5	6	7	8	9	10	Final
Chinese Taipei 🔨	3	3	2	1	3	0	2	X	X	X	14
Qatar	0	0	0	0	0	1	0	X	X	X	1

Sheet B	1	2	3	4	5	6	7	8	9	10	Final
South Korea	0	0	0	0	2	0	1	0	X	X	3
China 🔨	0	1	1	1	0	3	0	2	X	X	8

Sheet C	1	2	3	4	5	6	7	8	9	10	Final
Kazakhstan	0	0	1	0	0	0	3	0	X	X	4
Japan 🔨	3	3	0	2	1	1	0	3	X	X	13

21 February, 18:00

Sheet A	1	2	3	4	5	6	7	8	9	10	Final
Qatar	0	0	0	3	0	1	0	1	X	X	5
China 🔨	3	4	3	0	1	0	3	0	X	X	14

Sheet B	1	2	3	4	5	6	7	8	9	10	Final
Kazakhstan	0	0	0	0	1	0	0	1	0	X	2
Chinese Taipei 🔨	0	3	2	1	0	2	3	0	2	X	13

Sheet C	1	2	3	4	5	6	7	8	9	10	Final
Japan 🔨	0	1	0	0	2	0	1	0	X	X	4
South Korea	2	0	2	1	0	2	0	1	X	X	8

=== Knockout round ===
Semifinals
1	China	8
4	Chinese Taipei	1
2	South Korea	5
3	Japan	6

Gold medal game
1	China	11
3	Japan	4
Bronze medal game
4	Chinese Taipei	5
2	South Korea	10

==== Semifinals ====
22 February, 13:30

Sheet A	1	2	3	4	5	6	7	8	9	10	Final
South Korea	0	0	1	0	2	0	2	0	0	0	5
Japan 🔨	1	1	0	1	0	2	0	0	0	1	6

Sheet B	1	2	3	4	5	6	7	8	9	10	Final
China 🔨	0	0	2	0	0	2	1	3	X	X	8
Chinese Taipei	0	0	0	0	1	0	0	0	X	X	1

==== Bronze medal game ====
23 February, 13:30

Sheet C	1	2	3	4	5	6	7	8	9	10	Final
Chinese Taipei	0	0	2	0	0	1	0	2	X	X	5
South Korea 🔨	3	0	0	0	1	0	6	0	X	X	10

==== Gold medal game ====
24 February, 13:30

Sheet C	1	2	3	4	5	6	7	8	9	10	Final
China 🔨	0	1	0	3	3	2	0	2	X	X	11
Japan	1	0	1	0	0	0	2	0	X	X	4

== Final standing ==
Rank	Team	Pld	W	L
1st place, gold medalist(s)	China	7	7	0
2nd place, silver medalist(s)	Japan	7	4	3
3rd place, bronze medalist(s)	South Korea	7	5	2
4	Chinese Taipei	7	2	5
5	Kazakhstan	5	1	4
6	Qatar	5	0	5
