= Speed skating at the 2017 Asian Winter Games – Women's 3000 metres =

Women's 3000 metres at the 2017 Asian Winter Games
- Venue: Meiji Hokkaido-Tokachi Oval
- Dates: 20 February 2017
- Competitors: 11 from 4 nations

Medalists
gold medal	Miho Takagi	Japan
silver medal	Kim Bo-reum	South Korea
bronze medal	Ayano Sato	Japan

The women's 3000 metres at the 2017 Asian Winter Games was held on February 20, 2017 in Obihiro, Japan.

== Schedule ==
All times are Japan Standard Time (UTC+09:00)

Date	Time	Event
Monday, 20 February 2017	15:50	Final

== Records ==
Prior to this competition, the existing world and Games records were as follows.

World Record	Cindy Klassen (CAN)	3:53.34	Calgary, Canada	18 March 2006
Games Record	Masako Hozumi (JPN)	4:07.82	Astana, Kazakhstan	31 January 2011

== Results ==
Rank	Pair	Athlete	Time	Notes
1st place, gold medalist(s)	6	Miho Takagi (JPN)	4:05.75	GR
2nd place, silver medalist(s)	5	Kim Bo-reum (KOR)	4:07.80	
3rd place, bronze medalist(s)	4	Ayano Sato (JPN)	4:10.07	
4	4	Han Mei (CHN)	4:12.00	
5	5	Maki Tabata (JPN)	4:13.51	
6	3	Park Do-yeong (KOR)	4:17.76	
7	2	Park Ji-woo (KOR)	4:21.02	
8	6	Liu Jing (CHN)	4:23.90	
9	2	Li Dan (CHN)	4:25.07	
10	3	Yelena Urvantseva (KAZ)	4:27.76	
11	1	Nadezhda Sidelnik (KAZ)	4:53.29	
