= Speed skating at the 2017 Asian Winter Games – Women's team pursuit =

Women's team pursuit at the 2017 Asian Winter Games
- Venue: Meiji Hokkaido-Tokachi Oval
- Dates: 21 February 2017
- Competitors: 12 from 4 nations

Medalists
gold medal	Japan; Misaki Oshigiri, Nana Takagi, Ayano Sato
silver medal	South Korea; Park Ji-woo, Noh Seon-yeong, Kim Bo-reum
bronze medal	China; Zhao Xin, Liu Jing, Han Mei

The women's team pursuit at the 2017 Asian Winter Games was held on 21 February 2017 in Obihiro, Japan.

== Schedule ==
All times are Japan Standard Time (UTC+09:00)

Date	Time	Event
Tuesday, 21 February 2017	15:35	Final

== Records ==
Prior to this competition, the existing world and Games records were as follows.

World Record	Canada	2:55.79	Calgary, Canada	6 December 2009
Games Record	South Korea	3:04.35	Astana, Kazakhstan	6 February 2011

== Results ==
Rank	Pair	Team	Time	Notes
1st place, gold medalist(s)	1	Japan (JPN); Misaki Oshigiri; Nana Takagi; Ayano Sato	3:00.08	GR
2nd place, silver medalist(s)	2	South Korea (KOR); Park Ji-woo; Noh Seon-yeong; Kim Bo-reum	3:06.67	
3rd place, bronze medalist(s)	2	China (CHN); Zhao Xin; Liu Jing; Han Mei	3:10.23	
4	1	Kazakhstan (KAZ); Yekaterina Aydova; Nadezhda Sidelnik; Yelena Urvantseva	3:17.52	
