= Snowboarding at the 2017 Asian Winter Games – Women's slalom =

Women's slalom at the 2017 Asian Winter Games
- Venue: Sapporo Teine
- Dates: 20 February 2017
- Competitors: 14 from 7 nations

Medalists
gold medal	Zang Ruxin	China
silver medal	Eri Yanetani	Japan
bronze medal	Shin Da-hae	South Korea

The women's snowboard slalom competition at the 2017 Asian Winter Games in Sapporo, Japan was held on 20 February at the Sapporo Teine.

== Schedule ==
All times are Japan Standard Time (UTC+09:00)

Date	Time	Event
Monday, 20 February 2017	10:00	1st run
Monday, 20 February 2017	12:15	2nd run

== Results ==
Rank	Athlete	1st run	2nd run	Total
1st place, gold medalist(s)	Zang Ruxin (CHN)	43.50	40.12	1:23.62
2nd place, silver medalist(s)	Eri Yanetani (JPN)	45.63	38.06	1:23.69
3rd place, bronze medalist(s)	Shin Da-hae (KOR)	46.20	40.22	1:26.42
4	Jeong Hae-rim (KOR)	46.69	40.24	1:26.93
5	Niu Jiaqi (CHN)	47.07	41.04	1:28.11
6	Gong Naiying (CHN)	45.44	43.94	1:29.38
7	Xu Xiaoxiao (CHN)	45.19	47.10	1:32.29
8	Millie Bongiorno (AUS)	49.40	43.12	1:32.52
9	Asa Toyoda (JPN)	51.01	42.94	1:33.95
10	Setareh Yazdani (IRI)	51.86	46.94	1:38.80
11	Xeniya Tupik (KAZ)	52.71	47.06	1:39.77
12	Dariya Slobodkina (KAZ)	55.20	47.94	1:43.14
13	Shima Yarkhah (IRI)	57.87	46.56	1:44.43
14	Uguette Fakhry (LBN)	1:10.69	58.94	2:09.63
