= Ski jumping at the 2017 Asian Winter Games – Men's normal hill individual =

Men's normal hill individual at the 2017 Asian Winter Games
- Venue: Miyanomori Ski Jump Stadium
- Dates: 22 February 2017
- Competitors: 16 from 4 nations

Medalists
gold medal	Yukiya Sato	Japan
silver medal	Yuken Iwasa	Japan
bronze medal	Sergey Tkachenko	Kazakhstan

The men's normal hill HS100 individual competition at the Ski jumping at the 2017 Asian Winter Games in Sapporo, Japan was held on 22 February at the Miyanomori Ski Jump Stadium.

== Schedule ==
All times are Japan Standard Time (UTC+09:00)

Date	Time	Event
Wednesday, 22 February 2017	10:30	Final

== Results ==
Rank	Athlete	1st round		Final round		Total
Rank	Athlete	Distance	Score	Distance	Score	Total
1st place, gold medalist(s)	Yukiya Sato (JPN)	98.5	131.5	94.5	122.5	254.0
2nd place, silver medalist(s)	Yuken Iwasa (JPN)	94.0	121.5	97.5	129.5	251.0
3rd place, bronze medalist(s)	Sergey Tkachenko (KAZ)	93.5	118.5	93.5	119.5	238.0
4	Masamitsu Ito (JPN)	90.5	113.5	94.0	120.5	234.0
5	Choi Seo-u (KOR)	93.0	119.5	86.0	103.0	222.5
6	Naoki Nakamura (JPN)	89.0	109.0	81.5	92.5	201.5
7	Marat Zhaparov (KAZ)	90.0	111.0	80.0	87.5	198.5
8	Kim Hyun-ki (KOR)	88.0	107.0	75.5	79.5	186.5
9	Sabirzhan Muminov (KAZ)	85.0	99.5	75.5	79.0	178.5
9	Konstantin Sokolenko (KAZ)	84.0	97.5	76.5	81.0	178.5
11	Choi Heung-chul (KOR)	83.0	96.5	74.0	73.5	170.0
12	Tian Zhandong (CHN)	77.5	82.0	70.0	63.5	145.5
13	Yang Guang (CHN)	72.5	71.5	67.0	59.0	130.5
14	Lee Ju-chan (KOR)	65.0	52.5	69.0	64.0	116.5
15	Sun Jianping (CHN)	71.0	65.5	62.0	46.0	111.5
16	Chen Zhe (CHN)	64.0	50.5	61.5	45.0	95.5
