= Speed skating at the 2017 Asian Winter Games – Women's mass start =

Women's mass start at the 2017 Asian Winter Games
- Venue: Meiji Hokkaido-Tokachi Oval
- Dates: 23 February 2017
- Competitors: 12 from 5 nations

Medalists
gold medal	Miho Takagi	Japan
silver medal	Ayano Sato	Japan
bronze medal	Kim Bo-reum	South Korea

The women's mass start at the 2017 Asian Winter Games was held on 23 February 2017 in Obihiro, Japan.

== Schedule ==
All times are Japan Standard Time (UTC+09:00)

Date	Time	Event
Thursday, 23 February 2017	14:07	Final

== Results ==
Legend

- DNF — Did not finish
- DNS — Did not start

Rank	Athlete	Sprint				Total	Time
Rank	Athlete	1	2	3	4	Total	Time
1st place, gold medalist(s)	Miho Takagi (JPN)	3	3	5	60	71	8:21.81
2nd place, silver medalist(s)	Ayano Sato (JPN)	5	5	3	40	53	8:21.88
3rd place, bronze medalist(s)	Kim Bo-reum (KOR)				20	20	8:47.46
4	Nana Takagi (JPN)	1	1			2	8:51.51
5	Guo Dan (CHN)					0	8:47.50
6	Park Do-yeong (KOR)					0	8:47.58
7	Han Mei (CHN)					0	8:49.47
8	Li Dan (CHN)					0	8:50.55
9	Park Ji-woo (KOR)			1		DNF	
10	Natalie Hognestad (THA)					DNF	
—	Yelena Urvantseva (KAZ)					DNS	
—	Nadezhda Sidelnik (KAZ)					DNS	
