= Curling at the 2017 Asian Winter Games – Women's team =

Women's team at the 2017 Asian Winter Games
- Venue: Sapporo Curling Stadium
- Dates: 18–24 February 2017
- Competitors: 23 from 5 nations

Medalists
gold medal	China; Wang Bingyu, Wang Rui, Liu Jinli, Zhou Yan, Yang Ying
silver medal	South Korea; Kim Eun-jung, Kim Kyeong-ae, Kim Seon-yeong, Kim Yeong-mi
bronze medal	Japan; Satsuki Fujisawa, Mari Motohashi, Chinami Yoshida, Yurika Yoshida, Yumi Suzuki

The women's curling tournament at the 2017 Asian Winter Games was held in Sapporo, Japan between 18–24 February at Sapporo Curling Stadium. Curling returns to the competition schedule after missing out at the last edition of the games in 2011.

A total of five teams contested the women's curling competition.

== Squads ==
China	Japan	Kazakhstan	Qatar
Wang Bingyu; Wang Rui; Liu Jinli; Zhou Yan; Yang Ying	Satsuki Fujisawa; Mari Motohashi; Chinami Yoshida; Yurika Yoshida; Yumi Suzuki	Ramina Yunicheva; Anastassiya Surgay; Kamila Bakanova; Diana Torkina; Sitora Alliyarova	Maryam Binali; Hanan Al-Boinin; Mubarka Al-Abdulla; Dhabya Al-Boinin
South Korea			
Kim Eun-jung; Kim Kyeong-ae; Kim Seon-yeong; Kim Yeong-mi			

== Results ==
All times are Japan Standard Time (UTC+09:00)

=== Round robin ===
Pos	Team	Skip	Pld	W	L	W–L	PF	PA	Qualification
1	South Korea	Kim Eun-jung	4	4	0	—	57	14	Semifinals
2	China	Wang Bingyu	4	3	1	—	57	16	Semifinals
3	Japan	Satsuki Fujisawa	4	2	2	—	44	19	Semifinals
4	Kazakhstan	Ramina Yunicheva	4	1	3	—	20	57	Semifinals
5	Qatar	Maryam Binali	4	0	4	—	6	78	

Source: OCA

18 February, 13:30

Sheet A	1	2	3	4	5	6	7	8	9	10	Final
Japan 🔨	2	3	1	0	4	3	2	2	X	X	17
Qatar	0	0	0	1	0	0	0	0	X	X	1

Sheet C	1	2	3	4	5	6	7	8	9	10	Final
Kazakhstan	0	0	1	0	0	0	1	X	X	X	2
China 🔨	6	1	0	7	1	5	0	X	X	X	20

19 February, 9:00

Sheet A	1	2	3	4	5	6	7	8	9	10	Final
Qatar	0	0	0	1	0	0	0	1	X	X	2
South Korea 🔨	4	5	4	0	4	6	1	0	X	X	24

Sheet B	1	2	3	4	5	6	7	8	9	10	Final
Kazakhstan	1	0	0	0	0	1	0	1	0	X	3
Japan 🔨	0	4	1	3	2	0	2	0	5	X	17

20 February, 9:00

Sheet A	1	2	3	4	5	6	7	8	9	10	Final
South Korea	0	2	2	0	0	1	0	2	0	1	8
China 🔨	1	0	0	1	1	0	0	0	3	0	6

Sheet C	1	2	3	4	5	6	7	8	9	10	Final
Qatar	0	1	0	1	0	0	0	0	X	X	2
Kazakhstan 🔨	2	0	1	0	4	2	2	3	X	X	14

20 February, 18:00

Sheet B	1	2	3	4	5	6	7	8	9	10	Final
China 🔨	4	0	5	4	5	5	X	X	X	X	23
Qatar	0	1	0	0	0	0	X	X	X	X	1

Sheet C	1	2	3	4	5	6	7	8	9	10	Final
Japan	0	1	1	0	0	1	0	0	2	0	5
South Korea 🔨	1	0	0	1	2	0	1	1	0	1	7

21 February, 13:30

Sheet B	1	2	3	4	5	6	7	8	9	10	Final
South Korea 🔨	3	2	2	3	4	3	0	1	X	X	18
Kazakhstan	0	0	0	0	0	0	1	0	X	X	1

Sheet C	1	2	3	4	5	6	7	8	9	10	Final
China 🔨	2	0	2	0	0	0	4	0	0	X	8
Japan	0	1	0	2	0	1	0	0	1	X	5

=== Knockout round ===
Semifinals
1	South Korea	15
4	Kazakhstan	3
2	China	6
3	Japan	5

Gold medal game
1	South Korea	5
2	China	12
Bronze medal game
4	Kazakhstan	0
3	Japan	17

==== Semifinals ====
22 February, 18:00

Sheet A	1	2	3	4	5	6	7	8	9	10	Final
Japan	0	0	0	0	3	0	0	2	0	0	5
China 🔨	0	0	1	0	0	2	1	0	0	2	6

Sheet B	1	2	3	4	5	6	7	8	9	10	Final
South Korea 🔨	3	4	2	1	0	2	0	3	0	X	15
Kazakhstan	0	0	0	0	1	0	1	0	1	X	3

==== Bronze medal game ====
23 February, 18:00

Sheet C	1	2	3	4	5	6	7	8	9	10	Final
Japan 🔨	3	1	4	1	1	2	4	1	X	X	17
Kazakhstan	0	0	0	0	0	0	0	0	X	X	0

==== Gold medal game ====
24 February, 18:00

Sheet C	1	2	3	4	5	6	7	8	9	10	Final
China	0	2	0	2	2	0	1	2	3	X	12
South Korea 🔨	1	0	2	0	0	2	0	0	0	X	5

== Final standing ==
Rank	Team	Pld	W	L
1st place, gold medalist(s)	China	6	5	1
2nd place, silver medalist(s)	South Korea	6	5	1
3rd place, bronze medalist(s)	Japan	6	3	3
4	Kazakhstan	6	1	5
5	Qatar	4	0	4
