= Curling at the 2017 Asian Winter Games =

- Venue: Sapporo Curling Stadium
- Dates: 18–24 February 2017
- Competitors: 52 from 6 nations

Curling at the 2017 Asian Winter Games was held in Sapporo, Japan between 18–24 February at Sapporo Curling Stadium. A total of two events were contested: a men's and women's tournaments. Curling returns to the competition schedule after missing out at the last edition of the games in 2011.

A total of eleven teams from six countries (six men and five women) contested the curling competitions.

== Schedule ==
P	Preliminary round	½	Semifinals	B	Bronze medal match	G	Gold medal match

Event↓/Date →	18th Sat	19th Sun	20th Mon	21st Tue	22nd Wed	23rd Thu	24th Fri
Men's team	P	P	P	P	½	B	G
Women's team	P	P	P	P	½	B	G

== Medalists ==
Event	Gold	Silver	Bronze
Men's team	China; Liu Rui; Xu Xiaoming; Ba Dexin; Zang Jialiang; Zou Qiang	Japan; Yusuke Morozumi; Tetsuro Shimizu; Tsuyoshi Yamaguchi; Kosuke Morozumi; Kosuke Hirata	South Korea; Kim Soo-hyuk; Park Jong-duk; Kim Tae-hwan; Nam Yoon-ho; Yoo Min-hyeon
Women's team	China; Wang Bingyu; Wang Rui; Liu Jinli; Zhou Yan; Yang Ying	South Korea; Kim Eun-jung; Kim Kyeong-ae; Kim Seon-yeong; Kim Yeong-mi	Japan; Satsuki Fujisawa; Mari Motohashi; Chinami Yoshida; Yurika Yoshida; Yumi Suzuki

== Medal table ==
Rank	Nation	Gold	Silver	Bronze	Total
1	China (CHN)	2	0	0	2
2	Japan (JPN)	0	1	1	2
2	South Korea (KOR)	0	1	1	2
Totals (3 entries)		2	2	2	6

== Participating nations ==
A total of 52 athletes from 6 nations competed in curling at the 2017 Asian Winter Games:

- China (10)
- Chinese Taipei (5)
- Japan (10)
- Kazakhstan (10)
- Qatar (8)
- South Korea (9)

== Final standing ==
=== Men ===
Rank	Team	Pld	W	L
1st place, gold medalist(s)	China	7	7	0
2nd place, silver medalist(s)	Japan	7	4	3
3rd place, bronze medalist(s)	South Korea	7	5	2
4	Chinese Taipei	7	2	5
5	Kazakhstan	5	1	4
6	Qatar	5	0	5

=== Women ===
Rank	Team	Pld	W	L
1st place, gold medalist(s)	China	6	5	1
2nd place, silver medalist(s)	South Korea	6	5	1
3rd place, bronze medalist(s)	Japan	6	3	3
4	Kazakhstan	6	1	5
5	Qatar	4	0	4
