= Ski jumping at the 2017 Asian Winter Games =

- Venue: Miyanomori Ski Jump Stadium; Okurayama Ski Jump Stadium
- Dates: 22–25 February 2017
- Competitors: 17 from 4 nations

Ski jumping at the 2017 Asian Winter Games was held in Sapporo, Japan between 22 February to 25 February 2017 at the Miyanomori Ski Jump Stadium for the normal hill and Okurayama Ski Jump Stadium for the large hill. A total of three events were contested (all for men); normal hill, large hill and team large hill. Host nation Japan dominated the competition winning all three gold medals.

== Schedule ==
F	Final

Event↓/Date →	22nd Wed	23rd Thu	24th Fri	25th Sat
Men's normal hill individual	F			
Men's large hill individual			F	
Men's large hill team				F

== Medalists ==
Event	Gold	Silver	Bronze
Normal hill individual	Yukiya Sato; Japan	Yuken Iwasa; Japan	Sergey Tkachenko; Kazakhstan
Large hill individual	Naoki Nakamura; Japan	Yuken Iwasa; Japan	Marat Zhaparov; Kazakhstan
Large hill team	Japan; Yuken Iwasa; Yukiya Sato; Naoki Nakamura; Masamitsu Ito	Kazakhstan; Sabirzhan Muminov; Konstantin Sokolenko; Marat Zhaparov; Sergey Tkachenko	South Korea; Lee Ju-chan; Choi Heung-chul; Kim Hyun-ki; Choi Seo-u

== Medal table ==
Rank	Nation	Gold	Silver	Bronze	Total
1	Japan (JPN)	3	2	0	5
2	Kazakhstan (KAZ)	0	1	2	3
3	South Korea (KOR)	0	0	1	1
Totals (3 entries)		3	3	3	9

== Participating nations ==
A total of 17 athletes from 4 nations competed in ski jumping at the 2017 Asian Winter Games:

- China (5)
- Japan (4)
- Kazakhstan (4)
- South Korea (4)
