= Qatar at the 2017 Asian Winter Games =

- IOC code: QAT
- NOC: Qatar Olympic Committee

in Sapporo and Obihiro February 19–26
- Competitors: 32 in 3 sports
- Flag bearer: Thamer Al Mohannadi
- Medals: Gold 0 Silver 0 Bronze 0 Total 0

Asian Winter Games appearances
- 2011; 2017; 2025; 2029

Qatar is scheduled to compete in the 2017 Asian Winter Games in Sapporo and Obihiro, Japan from February 19 to 26.

Qatar is scheduled to compete in three sports. After competing in speed skating in its debut at the 2011 Games, this will mark the country's debut in all three sports it contests at this edition: curling, hockey and short track speed skating. Qatar's team will consist of 32 athletes.

On February 19, 2017 it was announced that ice hockey player Thamer Al Mohannadi would be the country's flagbearer during the parade of nations at the opening ceremony.

== Competitors ==
The following table lists the Qatari delegation per sport and gender.

Sport	Men	Women	Total
Curling	4	4	8
Ice hockey	21	0	21
Short track speed skating	3	0	3
Total	28	4	32

== Curling ==
Qatar has entered a men's and women's team, each consisting of four athletes (for a total of eight).

=== Men's tournament ===
- Nabeel Alyafei – Skip
- Ahmed Al Fahad – Third
- Jaber Al Ozali – Second
- Ahmad Khashabi – Lead

Key
Teams to playoffs

Country	Skip	W	L
China	Liu Rui	5	0
South Korea	Kim Soo-hyuk	4	1
Japan	Yusuke Morozumi	3	2
Chinese Taipei	Randolph Shen	2	3
Kazakhstan	Viktor Kim	1	4
Qatar	Nabeel Alyafei	0	5

Round-robin

Qatar has a bye in draw 3

Draw 1

Saturday, February 18, 9:00

Sheet C	1	2	3	4	5	6	7	8	9	10	Final
South Korea (Soo-hyuk)	3	3	3	3	3	2	3	x	x	x	20
Qatar (Alyafei)	0	0	0	0	0	0	0	x	x	x	0

Draw 2

Saturday, February 18, 18:00

Sheet B	1	2	3	4	5	6	7	8	9	10	Final
Japan (Morozumi)	1	2	4	3	4	5	0	X	X	X	19
Qatar (Alyafei)	0	0	0	0	0	0	1	X	X	X	1

Draw 4

Monday, February 20, 13:30

Sheet C	1	2	3	4	5	6	7	8	9	10	Final
Qatar (Alyafei)	0	0	1	1	0	1	0	1	0	0	4
Kazakhstan (Kim)	0	1	0	0	4	0	2	0	4	1	12

Draw 5

Tuesday, February 21, 9:00

Sheet A	1	2	3	4	5	6	7	8	9	10	Final
Chinese Taipei (Shen)	3	3	2	1	3	0	2	0	0	0	14
Qatar (Alyafei)	0	0	0	0	0	1	0	X	X	X	1

Draw 6

Tuesday, February 21, 18:00

Sheet A	1	2	3	4	5	6	7	8	9	10	Final
Qatar (Alyafei)	0	0	0	3	0	1	0	1	X	X	5
China (Rui)	3	4	3	0	1	0	3	0	X	X	14

=== Women's tournament ===
- Maryam Binali – Skip
- Hanan Al Boinin – Third
- Mubarka Al Abdulla – Second
- Dhabya Al Boinin – Lead

Key
Teams to playoffs

Country	Skip	W	L
South Korea	Kim Eun-jung	4	0
China	Wang Bingyu	3	1
Japan	Satsuki Fujisawa	2	2
Kazakhstan	Ramina Yunicheva	1	3
Qatar	Maryam Binali	0	4

Round-robin

Qatar has a bye in draw 5

Draw 1

Saturday, February 18, 13:30

Sheet A	1	2	3	4	5	6	7	8	9	10	Final
Japan (Fujisawa)	2	3	1	0	4	3	2	2	X	X	17
Qatar (Binali)	0	0	0	1	0	0	0	0	X	X	1

Draw 2

Saturday, February 19, 9:00

Sheet A	1	2	3	4	5	6	7	8	9	10	Final
Qatar (Binali)	0	0	0	1	0	0	0	1	X	X	2
South Korea (Eun-jung)	4	5	4	0	4	6	1	0	X	X	24

Draw 3

Sunday, February 20, 9:00

Sheet C	1	2	3	4	5	6	7	8	9	10	Final
Qatar (Binali)	0	1	0	1	0	0	0	0	X	X	2
Kazakhstan (Yunicheva)	2	0	1	0	4	2	2	3	X	X	14

Draw 4

Monday, February 20, 18:00

Sheet B	1	2	3	4	5	6	7	8	9	10	Final
China (Wang)	4	0	5	4	5	5	X	X	X	X	23
Qatar (Binali)	0	1	0	0	0	0	X	X	X	X	1

== Ice hockey ==
Qatar has entered a men's team. The team will compete in the Division two. Qatar finished in seventh place (17th place overall) in division 2 of the competition.

=== Men's tournament ===
Qatar was represented by the following 21 athletes:

- Mohamed Abdelaziz (G)
- Ahmad Alsulaiti (G)
- Eid Mohammed Al Kubaisi (D)
- Abdulla Al Muhaizaa (D)
- Mohammed Al Muhaizaa (D)
- Mohamed Alkaabi (D)
- Naif Alrumaihi (D)
- Saad Naimi (D)
- Turki Al Heidous (F)
- Saoud Al Kuwari (F)
- Thamer Al Mohannadi (F)
- Saad Al Moslamani (F)
- Ali Al Muhaizaa (F)
- Jassim Al Sheeb (F)
- Abdulrahman Alashqar (F)
- Mohammed Alkhalaf (F)
- Abdulla Alsulaiti (F)
- Abdulaziz Fakhroo (F)
- Ahmad Fakhroo (F)
- Jassim Fakhroo (F)
- Abdulla Mohammed (F)

Legend: G = Goalie, D = Defense, F = Forward

Group A

Rank	Team	Pld	W	OW	OL	L	GF	GA	GD	Pts
1	Kyrgyzstan	3	3	0	0	0	22	7	+15	9
2	Philippines	3	2	0	0	1	27	15	+12	6
3	(International Olympic Committee) Independent Olympic Athletes	3	1	0	0	2	9	15	–6	3
4	Qatar	3	0	0	0	3	6	27	–21	0

21 February 2017; 16:30	Qatar	2–6 (0–1, 0–2, 2–3)	(International Olympic Committee) Independent Olympic Athletes	Hoshioki Ice Skating Rink; Attendance: 62

Game reference
4 min	Penalties	16 min
16	Shots	33

23 February 2017; 20:00	Qatar	2–14 (1–4, 0–5, 1–5)	Philippines	Hoshioki Ice Skating Rink; Attendance: 103

Game reference
39 min	Penalties	10 min
32	Shots	50

24 February 2017; 16:30	Kyrgyzstan	7–2 (2–0, 4–0, 1–2)	Qatar	Hoshioki Ice Skating Rink; Attendance: 68

Game reference
26 min	Penalties	14 min
55	Shots	24

== Short track speed skating ==
Qatar has entered three male short track speed skaters.

Men

- Mubarak Al Mohannadi
- Jumah Al Sulaiti
- Mohammed Al Sahouti
