= Takuro Oda =

Japanese speed skater (born 1992)

Personal information
- Born: 13 July 1992 (age 33) Hidako, Japan
- Height: 1.78 m (5 ft 10 in)
- Weight: 75 kg (165 lb)

Sport
- Country: Japan
- Sport: Speed skating

Takuro Oda (小田 卓朗, Oda Takurō; born 13 July 1992) is a Japanese speed skater. He competed in the 2018 Winter Olympics.
