= Chinese Taipei at the 2017 Asian Winter Games =

- IOC code: TPE
- NOC: Chinese Taipei Olympic Committee

in Sapporo and Obihiro February 19–26
- Competitors: 41 in 5 sports
- Flag bearer: Shen Yen-chin(Opening Ceremony) Amy Lin(Closing Ceremony)
- Medals: Gold 0 Silver 0 Bronze 0 Total 0

Asian Winter Games appearances
- 1990; 1996; 1999; 2003; 2007; 2011; 2017; 2025; 2029

Chinese Taipei is scheduled to compete in the 2017 Asian Winter Games in Sapporo and Obihiro, Japan from February 19 to 26. Chinese Taipei is scheduled to compete in all five sports (seven disciplines). The Chinese Taipei delegation consists of 41 athletes and 30 officials. This marks the nation's largest ever Asian Winter Games team in terms of athletes and officials sent.

== Competitors ==
The following table lists the Chinese Taipei delegation per sport and gender.

Sport	Men	Women	Total
Alpine skiing	2	1	3
Biathlon	1	0	0
Curling	5	0	5
Figure skating	2	1	3
Ice hockey	20	0	20
Short track speed skating	4	4	8
Speed skating	1	0	1
Total	35	6	41

== Alpine skiing ==
Chinese Taipei's Alpine skiing team consists of three athletes (two men and one woman).

Men

- Ho Ping-jui
- Wu Meng-che

Woman

- Huang Pei-chen

== Biathlon ==
Chinese Taipei's biathlon team consists of one male athlete.

Man

- Wang Yao-Yi

== Curling ==
Chinese Taipei has entered a men's team. The team consists of five athletes.

=== Men's tournament ===
- Randolph Shen – skip
- Nicholas Hsu – third
- Brendon Liu – second
- Ting-Li Lin – lead
- Steve Koo – alternate

Key
Teams to playoffs

Country	Skip	W	L
China	Liu Rui	5	0
South Korea	Kim Soo-hyuk	4	1
Japan	Yusuke Morozumi	3	2
Chinese Taipei	Randolph Shen	2	3
Kazakhstan	Viktor Kim	1	4
Qatar	Nabeel Alyafei	0	5

Round-robin

Chinese Taipei has a bye in draw 2

Draw 1

Saturday, February 18, 9:00

Sheet A	1	2	3	4	5	6	7	8	9	10	Final
Japan (Morozumi)	0	2	0	0	6	0	3	X	X	X	11
Chinese Taipei (Shen)	1	0	1	0	0	1	0	X	X	X	3

Draw 3

Sunday, February 19, 9:00

Sheet C	1	2	3	4	5	6	7	8	9	10	Final
China (Rui)	1	0	0	0	1	1	1	0	3	X	7
Chinese Taipei (Shen)	0	0	2	0	0	0	0	1	0	X	3

Draw 4

Monday, February 20, 13:30

Sheet B	1	2	3	4	5	6	7	8	9	10	Final
Chinese Taipei (Shen)	0	0	0	0	2	0	0	1	0	0	3
South Korea (Soo-hyuk)	0	0	2	0	0	0	2	0	1	2	7

Draw 5

Tuesday, February 21, 9:00

Sheet A	1	2	3	4	5	6	7	8	9	10	Final
Chinese Taipei (Shen)	3	3	2	1	3	0	2	0	0	0	14
Qatar (Alyafei)	0	0	0	0	0	1	0	X	X	X	1

Draw 6

Tuesday, February 21, 18:00

Sheet B	1	2	3	4	5	6	7	8	9	10	Final
Kazakhstan (Kim)	0	0	0	0	1	0	0	1	0	X	2
Chinese Taipei (Shen)	0	3	2	1	0	2	3	0	2	X	13

Semifinals

Wednesday, February 22, 1:30

Sheet B	1	2	3	4	5	6	7	8	9	10	Final
Chinese Taipei (Shen)	0	0	0	0	1	0	0	0	0	0	1
China (Rui)	0	0	2	0	0	2	1	3	X	X	8

Bronze medal match

Thursday, February 23, 1:30

Sheet C	1	2	3	4	5	6	7	8	9	10	Final
Chinese Taipei (Shen)	0	0	2	0	0	1	0	2	X	X	5
South Korea (Soo-hyuk) (bronze)	3	0	0	0	1	0	6	0	X	X	10

- Chinese Taipei finishes in fourth place.

== Figure skating ==
Chinese Taipei's figure skating team consists of three athletes (two men and one woman).

Singles

Athlete	Event	SP		FS		Total	
Athlete	Event	Points	Rank	Points	Rank	Points	Rank
Tsao Chih-I	Men's	63.68	11				
Lee Meng-ju	Men's	44.49	16				
Amy Lin	Ladies	47.15	10				

== Ice hockey ==
Chinese Taipei has entered a men's team. The team will compete in the Division one. Chinese Taipei finished in second place (6th place overall) in division 1 of the competition.

=== Men's tournament ===
Chinese Taipei was represented by the following 20 athletes:

- Huang Sheng-chun (G)
- Liao Yu-cheng (G)
- Ting Pang-keng (G)
- Chang Hsing-han (D)
- Chang Wei-ting (D)
- Chao Yu-tung (D)
- Huang Jen-hung (D)
- Shen Yen-lin (D)
- Yang Chang-lin (D)
- Yang Hsiao-hao (D)
- Chang Kai-hsiang (F)
- Chang Tse-wei (F)
- Chen Jui-tang (F)
- Chiu Yi-wei (F)
- Lin Hung-ju (F)
- Lin Tzu-chieh (F)
- Shen Yen-chin (F)
- Tang Yi-cheng (F)
- Weng To (F)
- Yang Chang-hsing (F)

Legend

- G– Goalie D = Defense-man F = Forward

Rank	Team	Pld	W	OW	OL	L	GF	GA	GD	Pts
5	Thailand	5	4	1	0	0	36	12	+24	14
6	Chinese Taipei	5	3	1	1	0	34	13	+21	12
7	United Arab Emirates	5	3	0	0	2	29	24	+5	9
8	Mongolia	5	2	0	0	3	25	23	+2	6
9	Hong Kong	5	1	0	1	3	27	27	0	4
10	Singapore	5	0	0	0	5	4	56	–52	0

18 February 2017; 15:30	Chinese Taipei	10–3 (4–1, 1–1, 5–1)	United Arab Emirates	Mikaho Gymnasium; Attendance: 290

Game reference
			Referee: (Japan) Hokkanen Kimmo; Linesmen: Juris Barcelo (Japan) Era Manabu
12 min	Penalties	22 min	Referee: (Japan) Hokkanen Kimmo; Linesmen: Juris Barcelo (Japan) Era Manabu
44	Shots	20	Referee: (Japan) Hokkanen Kimmo; Linesmen: Juris Barcelo (Japan) Era Manabu

20 February 2017; 19:00	Hong Kong	4–5 (3–0, 0–3, 1–1, 0–0, 0–1)	Chinese Taipei	Mikaho Gymnasium; Attendance: 180

Game reference
28 min	Penalties	14 min
19	Shots	39

21 February 2017; 12:00	Singapore	1–11 (1–3, 0–5, 0–3)	Chinese Taipei	Mikaho Gymnasium; Attendance: 200

Game reference
6 min	Penalties	14 min
16	Shots	43

23 February 2017; 12:00	Chinese Taipei	2–3 (1–0, 0–0, 1–2, 0–1)	Thailand	Mikaho Gymnasium; Attendance: 500

Game reference
6 min	Penalties	6 min
40	Shots	50

25 February 2017; 12:00	Mongolia	2–6 (0–1, 1–2, 1–3)	Chinese Taipei	Mikaho Gymnasium; Attendance: 500

Game reference
14 min	Penalties	14 min
23	Shots	28

== Short track speed skating ==
Chinese Taipei's short track speed skating team consists of eight athletes (4 men and 4 women).

Men

- Lin Chung-Chieh
- Lin Xian-You
- Su Jun-Peng
- Tsai Chia-Wei

Women

- Lin Yu-Tzu
- Lu Chia-Tung
- Wang Kuan-Ming
- Yang Zih-Shian

== Speed skating ==
Chinese Taipei's speed skating team consists of one male athlete.

Man

Athlete	Event	Final	
Athlete	Event	Time	Rank
Sung Ching-yang	500 m	35.74	9
Sung Ching-yang	1000 m	1:12.46	16
