= Marat Zhaparov =

Kazakhstani ski jumper (born 1985)

Personal information
- Born: August 25, 1985 (age 40) Ridder, Kazakh SSR, Soviet Union

Sport
- Sport: Skiing

Marat Zhaparov (born August 25, 1985 in Ridder) is a Kazakhstani ski jumper.

Zhaparov competed at the 2014 Winter Olympics for Kazakhstan. He placed 49th in the normal hill qualifying round, failing to advance, and 48th in the large hill qualifying round.

Zhaparov made his World Cup debut in November 2013. As of September 2014, his best finish is 10th, in a pair of team events in 2013–14. His best individual finish is 50th, at a large hill event at Kuusamo in 2013–14.

== World Cup ==
=== Standings ===
Season	Overall	4H	SF	RAW
2016/17	—	—	—	67

== Continental Cup ==
=== Standings ===
Season	Overall (Summer + Winter)	Points	Summer	Points	Winter	Points
2014/15	105	45	57	44	140	1
2015/16	—	—	—	—	—	—
2016/17	120	33	68	33	—	—
