= Kim Min-seok (speed skater) =

South Korean-Hungarian speed skater

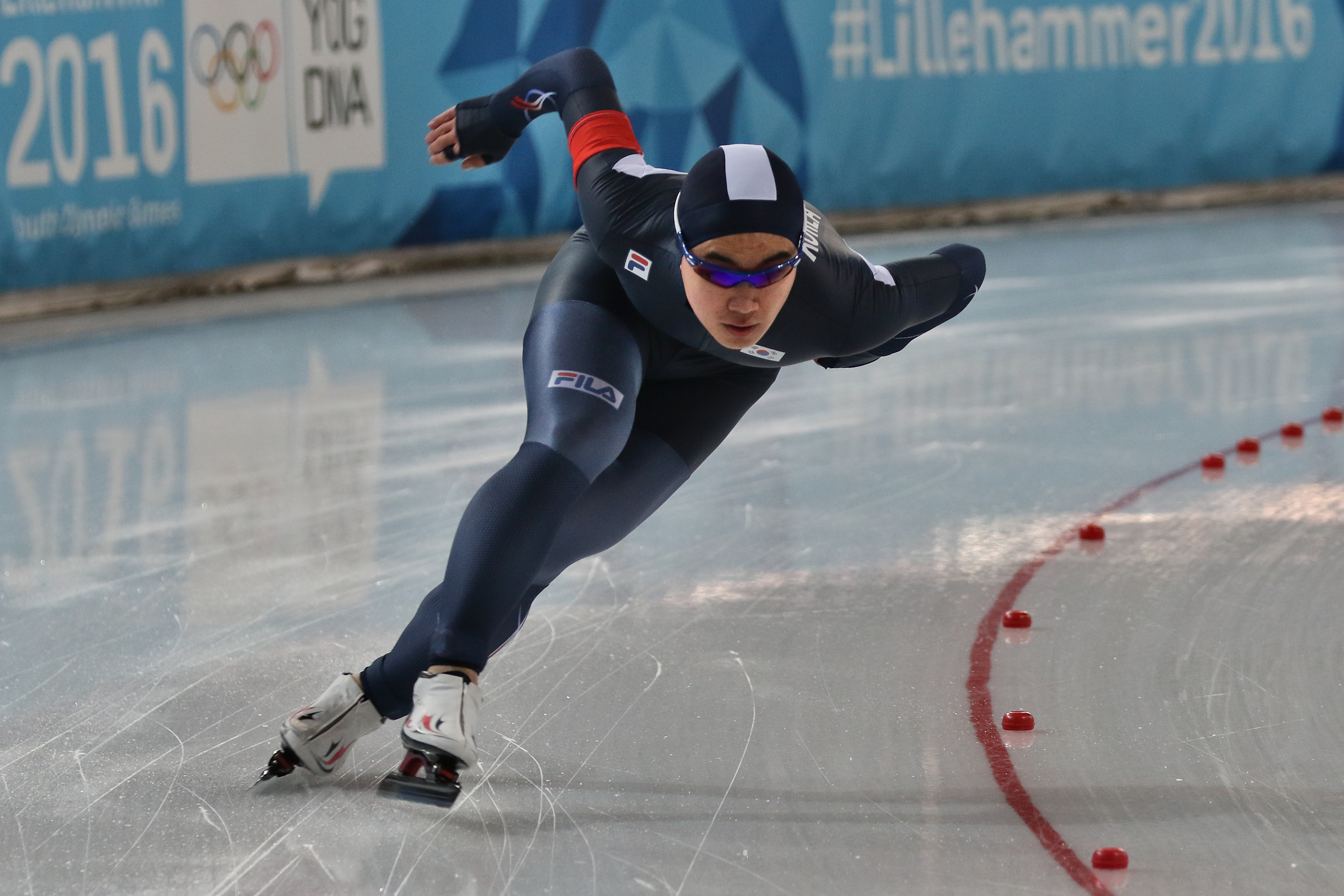
- Kim in 2016

Personal information
- Born: 14 June 1999 (age 27) Anyang, Gyeonggi, South Korea
- Height: 178 cm (5 ft 10 in)

Sport
- Country: Hungary (from 2024); South Korea (until 2024)
- Sport: Speed skating
Medal record
Representing South Korea
Olympic Games
Silver medal – second place	2018 Pyeongchang	Team pursuit
Bronze medal – third place	2018 Pyeongchang	1500 m
Bronze medal – third place	2022 Beijing	1500 m
Four Continents Championships
Gold medal – first place	2020 Milwaukee	1500 m
Silver medal – second place	2020 Milwaukee	Team pursuit
Bronze medal – third place	2022 Calgary	1500 m
Asian Winter Games
Gold medal – first place	2017 Sapporo	1500 m
Gold medal – first place	2017 Sapporo	Team pursuit
Bronze medal – third place	2017 Sapporo	Mass start
Winter Youth Olympics
Gold medal – first place	2016 Lillehammer	1500 m
Gold medal – first place	2016 Lillehammer	Mass start

Kim Min-seok (Korean: 김민석; born 14 June 1999) is a Hungarian speed skater who was born in South Korea and has competed for Hungary since 2024. He participated in the 2018 Winter Olympics and won a bronze medal in the 1500 m race, skating in his first ever Olympic event. He became the first Asian athlete to medal at this event. Kim then added to his medal tally by winning a silver medal in the team pursuit event.

== Filmography ==
=== Variety show ===
Year	Title	Network	Role	Notes
2018	It's Dangerous Beyond the Blankets	MBC	Ep. 6–7 (Season 2)	
