= India at the 2017 Asian Winter Games =

- IOC code: IND
- NOC: Indian Olympic Association

in Sapporo and Obihiro February 19–26
- Competitors: 27 in 6 sports
- Flag bearers: Opening Ceremony Akash Aradhya, Speed Skating, Himanshu Thakur (Closing Ceremony)
- Medals: Gold 0 Silver 0 Bronze 0 Total 0

Asian Winter Games appearances
- 1986; 1990; 1996; 1999; 2003; 2007; 2011; 2017; 2025; 2029

India competed in the 2017 Asian Winter Games in Sapporo and Obihiro, Japan from February 19 to 26.

India competed in two sports (six disciplines). The Indian team consisted of 27 athletes (16 men and 11 women).

== Competitors ==
The following table lists the Indian delegation per sport and gender.

Sport	Men	Women	Total
Alpine skiing	4	5	9
Cross-country skiing	2	3	5
Figure skating	2	1	3
Short track speed skating	5	1	6
Snowboarding	1	0	1
Speed skating	2	1	3
Total	16	11	27

== Alpine skiing ==
India's alpine skiing team consisted of nine athletes (four men and five women).

Men

Athlete	Event	Run 1		Run 2		Total	
Athlete	Event	Time	Rank	Time	Rank	Time	Rank
Himanshu Thakur	Slalom	59.81	17	DNF			
Hira Lal	Slalom	1:01.39	20	1:05.84	16	2:07.23	17
Arif Khan	Slalom	58.59	15	DNF			
Vineet Sharma	Slalom	DNF					
Himanshu Thakur	Giant Slalom	1:17.35	17	DNF			
Hira Lal	Giant Slalom	1:18.38	20	1:21.53	19	2:39.91	18
Arif Khan	Giant Slalom	DNF					
Vineet Sharma	Giant Slalom	1:24.17	27	1:27.65	25	2:51.82	25

Women

Athlete	Event	Run 1		Run 2		Total	
Athlete	Event	Time	Rank	Time	Rank	Time	Rank
Aanchal Thakur	Slalom	1:06.63	20	DNF			
Varsha Devi	Slalom	1:11.77	22	DNF			
Sandhya	Slalom	1:18.59	23	1:33.39	21	2:51.98	20
Preeti Dimri	Slalom	1:22.89	26	1:35.92	22	2:58.81	22
Aanchal Thakur	Giant Slalom	1:29.05	16	1:27.29	17	2:56.34	16
Varsha Devi	Giant Slalom	1:40.51	20	1:37.06	19	3:17.57	19
Sandhya	Giant Slalom	1:41.65	21	1:32.72	18	3:14.37	18
Gayatri Devi	Giant Slalom	2:11.64	27	DNF			

== Cross-country skiing ==
India's cross-country team consisted of five athletes (three men and two women).

Men

Athlete	Event	Time	Rank
Mohamed Iliyas	10Km Classical	36:13.8	18
Jagdish Singh	10Km Classical	36:48.4	19
Mohamed Iliyas	15Km Freestyle	51:24.2	18
Jagdish Singh	15Km Freestyle	50:22.0	17
Mohamed Iliyas	30Km Freestyle Mass start	1:41:08.7	17
Jagdish Singh	30Km Freestyle Mass start	1:36:43.5	16

Women

Athlete	Event	Time	Rank
Sarla Thakur	5Km Classical	DNF	
Nisha Devi	5Km Classical	36:03.6	19
Vikas Rana	5Km Classical	37:49.1	20
Sarla Thakur	10Km Freestyle	1:19:22.2	23
Nisha Devi	10Km Freestyle	1:06:30.2	20
Vikas Rana	10Km Freestyle	1:15:20.8	21
Sarla Thakur	15Km Freestyle Mass start	DNS	
Nisha Devi	15Km Freestyle Mass start	DNS	
Vikas Rana	15Km Freestyle Mass start	DNS	

== Figure skating ==
India's figure skating team consisted of three athletes (two male and one female). This was the first time India took part in the ice dancing competition. Notably, the ice dancing pair had only practiced for 8 days before competing, a potential cause in them finishing well behind the other teams.

Athlete(s)	Event	SP/SD		FS/FD		Total	
Athlete(s)	Event	Points	Rank	Points	Rank	Points	Rank
Nikhil Pingle	Men's	17.30	21	41.74	21	59.04	21
Aldrin Mathew / Anup Kumar Yama	Ice dancing	10.18	7	21.10	7	31.28	7

== Short track speed skating ==
India entered a team of six athletes in short track speed skating (5 men and 1 woman).

Men

Athlete	Event	Heat		QF		SF		F	
Athlete	Event	Time	Rank	Time	Rank	Time	Rank	Time	Rank
Akash Aradhya	500 m	45.457	4	Did Not Advance					
Sudhir Sohan Tarkar	500 m	47.736	3	Did Not Advance					
Raghvendra Gundami	500 m	47.736	5	Did Not Advance					
Akash Aradhya	1000 m	1:40.375	4	Did Not Advance					
Raghvendra Gundami	1000 m	1:43.239	5	Did Not Advance					
Ashwin Calen Dsilva	1000 m	1:39.562	4	Did Not Advance					
Ashwin Calen Dsilva	1500 m	2:49.967	5	NA		Did Not Advance			
Sudhir Sohan Tarkar	1500 m	2:36.272	3 Q	NA		No Time		Did Not Advance	
Omkar Yograj	1500 m	3:11.470	5	NA		Did Not Advance			
Ashwin Calen Dsilva Sudhir Sohan Tarkar Omkar Yograj Akash Aradhya Raghvendra Gundami	5000 m Relay	7:55.159	3 q	Penalty (DQ)	No Rank	Did Not Advance			

Women

Athlete	Event	Heat		QF		SF		F	
Athlete	Event	Time	Rank	Time	Rank	Time	Rank	Time	Rank
Varsha Puranik	500 m	54.445	3	Did Not Advance					
Varsha Puranik	1000 m	1:52.487	3	Did Not Advance					
Varsha Puranik	1500 m	2:55.404	4	NA		Did Not Advance			

== Snowboarding ==
India's snowboarding team consisted of one male athlete.

Athlete	Event	Run 1		Run 2		Total	
Athlete	Event	Time	Rank	Time	Rank	Time	Rank
Avtar Singh	Men's giant slalom	1:13.59	20	1:04.00	18	2:17.59	18
Avtar Singh	Men's slalom	1:04.71	21	52.84	17	1:57.55	17

== Speed skating ==
Men

Athlete	Event	Time	Rank
Vishwaraj Jadeja	500 m	41:24	19
Stephen Paul Kilari	500 m	38:03	17
Vishwaraj Jadeja	1000 m	1:22.55	20
Stephen Paul Kilari	1000 m	1:15.75	18
Vishwaraj Jadeja	1500 m	2:08.48	19
Stephen Paul Kilari	1500 m	2:01.32	17
Vishwaraj Jadeja	5000 m	7:44.31	11
Vishwaraj Jadeja	10000 m	15:49.38	8
Vishwaraj Jadeja	Mass Start	DQ	

Women

Athlete	Event	Time	Rank
Shruti Kotwal	500 m	45.51	16
Shruti Kotwal	1000 m	1:35.99	19
Shruti Kotwal	1500 m	2:42.48	17
