= Meiji Hokkaido-Tokachi Oval =

Speed skating venue in Obihiro, Japan

- Obihiro Forest Speed Skating Oval
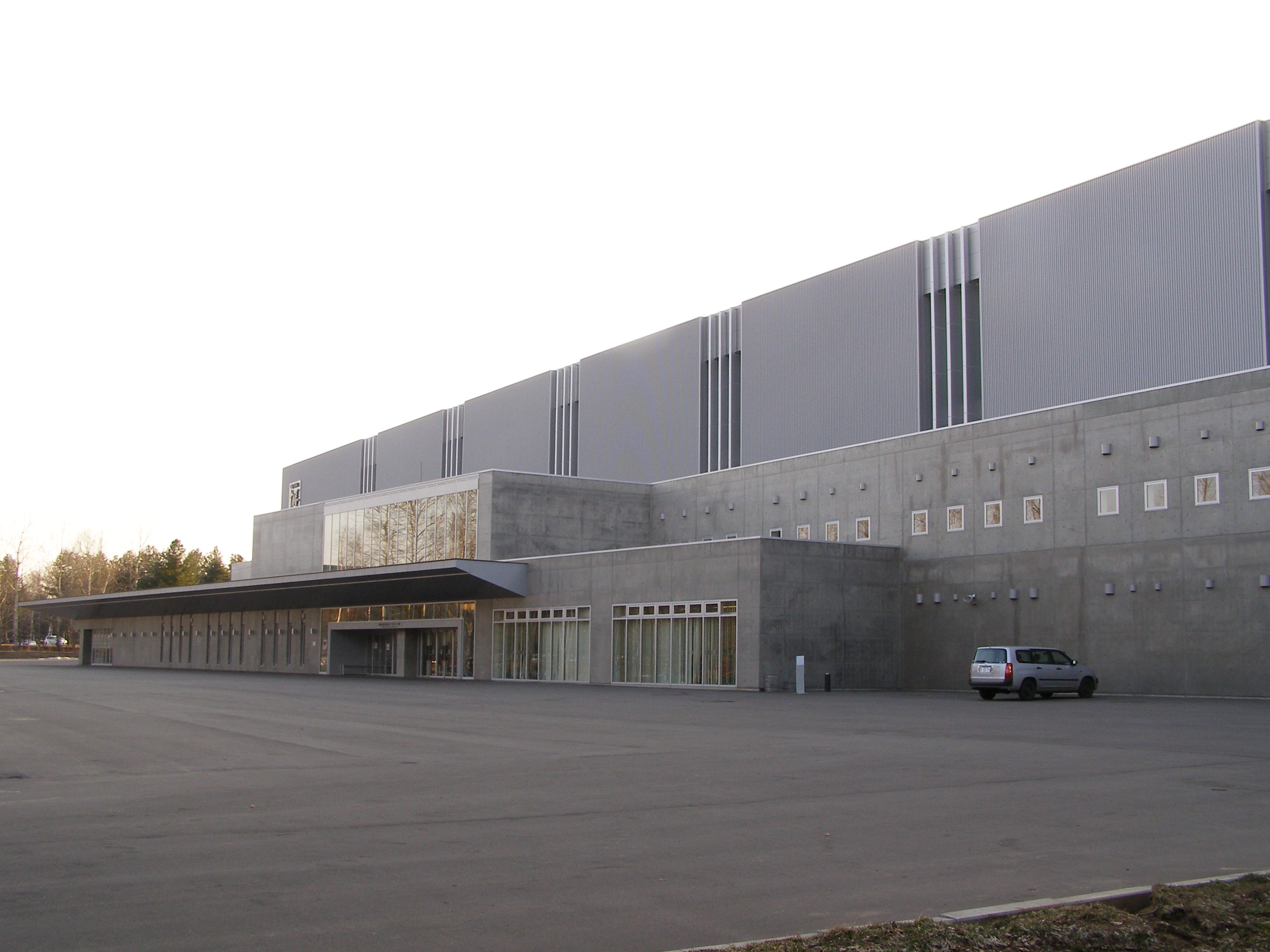
- Outside the oval
- Interactive map of Meiji Hokkaido-Tokachi Oval
- Location: Obihiro, Japan
- Coordinates: 42.8945°N 143.1403°E

Construction
- Opened: 2009

The Meiji Hokkaido-Tokachi Oval, also known as the Obihiro Forest Speed Skating Oval, is an indoor track for speed skating in the city of Obihiro on the island of Hokkaido in Japan. The hall was opened in September 2009 as the second indoor track in Japan, after M-Wave in Nagano.

The course measures 79 metres (259 ft) and is built on the same site as the old artificial track from 1986, the Obihiro No Mori Skating Centre.

== Competitions ==
The venue has hosted multiple international speed skating competitions.

- 2010 Asian Speed Skating Championships
- 2010 World Sprint Speed Skating Championships
- World Cup 5 of the 2010–11 ISU Speed Skating World Cup
- 2012 World Junior Speed Skating Championships
- World Cup 1 of the 2014–15 ISU Speed Skating World Cup
- speed skating competitions at the 2017 Asian Winter Games.
- World Cup 1 of the 2018–19 ISU Speed Skating World Cup
- World Cup 1 of the 2023–24 ISU Speed Skating World Cup
