= South Korea at the 2017 Asian Winter Games =

- IOC code: KOR
- NOC: Korean Olympic Committee

in Sapporo and Obihiro 19–26 February
- Competitors: 141 in 5 sports
- Flag bearer: Jung Dong-hyun
- Medals Ranked 2nd: Gold 16 Silver 18 Bronze 16 Total 50

Asian Winter Games appearances (overview)
- 1986; 1990; 1996; 1999; 2003; 2007; 2011; 2017; 2025; 2029

South Korea competed in the 2017 Asian Winter Games in Sapporo and Obihiro, Japan from 19 to 26 February. The country's goal for the games was a top two finish, and a record medal haul with at least 15 gold medals.

South Korea competed in all five sports (eleven disciplines). The team consisted of 141 athletes.

On 17 February 2017, it was announced that alpine skier Jung Dong-hyun would be the country's flagbearer during the parade of nations at the opening ceremony.

== Hotel Controversy ==
One of the athletes' hotels was the APA Hotel in Sapporo. The founder and president of this hotel chain, Toshio Motoya, is a strong supporter of political and historical views aligned with those of Japan's right wing. For example, Motoya claimed that "Japanese aggression, the Nanking Massacre, and comfort women" were "fabricated stories" or "fictitious". His book is available in each of the guest rooms at the hotel. This created controversy, particularly in China, which caused the games organizers to ask the hotel to take appropriate actions and remove them from guest rooms. Ahead of the Organizing Committee gaining exclusive access over the hotel from February 12, and an organizing committee official said, "we can decide what is removed and placed in the guest rooms so that we don’t place any items that offend athletes, from not only China, but also any other nation”. Eventually both South Korea and China requested that their athletes stay at a different hotel, and the organizing committee obliged by changing their accommodations to the Sapporo Prince Hotel.

== Medal summary ==
=== Medal table ===
Sport	Gold	Silver	Bronze	Total
Speed skating	6	3	3	12
Short track speed skating	5	5	3	13
Snowboarding	2	2	2	6
Cross-country skiing	1	3	3	7
Alpine skiing	1	2	2	5
Figure skating	1	0	0	1
Curling	0	1	1	2
Freestyle skiing	0	1	0	1
Ice hockey	0	1	0	1
Biathlon	0	0	1	1
Ski jumping	0	0	1	1
Totals (11 entries)	**16**	**18**	**16**	**50**

Medals by day
Day	1st place, gold medalist(s)	2nd place, silver medalist(s)	3rd place, bronze medalist(s)	Total
February 19	1	1	–	2
February 20	5	2	5	12
February 21	–	4	2	6
February 22	6	4	–	10
February 23	2	1	4	7
February 24	–	1	3	4
February 25	2	2	2	6
February 26	–	3	–	3
Total	16	18	16	50

=== Medalists ===
The following South Korean competitors won medals at the Games. In the by discipline sections below, medalists' names are bolded.

==== Gold medal ====
Medal	Name	Sport	Event	Date
Gold	Lee Sang-ho	Snowboarding	Men's giant slalom	February 19
Gold	Kim Magnus	Cross-country skiing	Men's 1.4 km sprint	February 20
Gold	Lee Sang-ho	Snowboarding	Men's slalom	February 20
Gold	Lee Seung-hoon	Speed skating	Men's 5000 m	February 20
Gold	Choi Min-jeong	Short track speed skating	Women's 1500 m	February 20
Gold	Park Se-yeong	Short track speed skating	Men's 1500 m	February 20
Gold	Lee Seung-hoon	Speed skating	Men's 10000 m	February 22
Gold	Shim Suk-hee	Short track speed skating	Women's 1000 m	February 22
Gold	Seo Yi-ra	Short track speed skating	Men's 1000 m	February 22
Gold	Kim Bo-reum	Speed skating	Women's 5000 m	February 22
Gold	Kim Ji-yoo, Noh Do-hee, Shim Suk-hee, Choi Min-jeong, Kim Geon-hee	Short track speed skating	Women's 3000 m relay	February 22
Gold	Joo Hyong-jun, Kim Min-seok, Lee Seung-hoon	Speed skating	Men's team pursuit	February 22
Gold	Kim Min-seok	Speed skating	Men's 1500 m	February 23
Gold	Lee Seung-hoon	Speed skating	Men's mass start	February 23
Gold	Jung Dong-hyun	Alpine skiing	Men's slalom	February 25
Gold	Choi Da-bin	Figure skating	Women's singles	February 25

==== Silver medal ====
Medal	Name	Sport	Event	Date
Silver	Choi Bo-gun	Snowboarding	Men's giant slalom	February 19
Silver	Shim Suk-hee	Short track speed skating	Women's 1500 m	February 20
Silver	Kim Bo-reum	Speed skating	Women's 3000 m	February 20
Silver	Lee Chae-won	Cross-country skiing	Women's 10 km	February 21
Silver	Lee Sang-hwa	Speed skating	Women's 500 m	February 21
Silver	Seo Yi-ra	Short track speed skating	Men's 500 m	February 21
Silver	Park Ji-woo, Noh Seon-yeong, Kim Bo-reum	Speed skating	Women's team pursuit	February 21
Silver	Kim Hyeon-tae	Alpine skiing	Men's giant slalom	February 22
Silver	Choi Min-jeong	Short track speed skating	Women's 1000 m	February 22
Silver	Sin Da-woon	Short track speed skating	Men's 1000 m	February 22
Silver	Park Se-yeong, Seo Yi-ra, Sin Da-woon, Lee Jung-su, Han Seung-soo	Short track speed skating	Men's 5000 m relay	February 22
Silver	Kim Magnus	Cross-country skiing	Men's 10 km	February 23
Silver	Kim Eun-jung, Kim Kyeong-ae, Kim Seon-yeong, Kim Yeong-mi	Curling	Women's tournament	February 24
Silver	Kim Hyeon-tae	Alpine skiing	Men's slalom	February 25
Silver	Kweon Lee-jun	Snowboarding	Men's halfpipe	February 25
Silver	Lee Chae-won	Cross-country skiing	Women's 15 km	February 26
Silver	Matt Dalton, Park Kye-hoon, Park Sun-je, Lee Don-ku, Oh Hyun-ho, Eric Regan, Kim Won-jun, Seo Yeong-jun, Kim Yoon-hwan, Bryan Young, Cho Min-ho, Shin Hyun-gyun, Lee Chong-hyun, Jeon Jung-woo, Park Jin-kyu, Shin Sang-hoon, Shin Sang-woo, Kim Ki-sung, Michael Swift, Mike Testwuide, Kim Sang-wook, Park Woo-sang, Kim Won-jung	Ice hockey	Men's tournament	February 26
Silver	Choi Jae-woo	Freestyle skiing	Men's moguls	February 26

==== Bronze medal ====
Medal	Name	Sport	Event	Date
Bronze	Ju Hye-ri	Cross-country skiing	Women's 1.4 km sprint	February 20
Bronze	Shin Da-hae	Snowboarding	Women's slalom	February 20
Bronze	Kim Sang-kyum	Snowboarding	Men's slalom	February 20
Bronze	Cha Min-kyu	Speed skating	Men's 500 m	February 20
Bronze	Lee Jung-su	Short track speed skating	Men's 1500 m	February 20
Bronze	Choi Min-jeong	Short track speed skating	Women's 500 m	February 21
Bronze	Park Se-yeong	Short track speed skating	Men's 500 m	February 21
Bronze	Kang Young-seo	Alpine skiing	Women's giant slalom	February 23
Bronze	Kim Soo-hyuk, Park Jong-duk, Kim Tae-hwan, Nam Yoon-ho, Yoo Min-hyeon	Curling	Men's tournament	February 23
Bronze	Kim Bo-reum	Speed skating	Women's mass start	February 23
Bronze	Kim Min-seok	Speed skating	Men's mass start	February 23
Bronze	Kim Yong-gyu	Biathlon	Men's 12.5 km pursuit	February 24
Bronze	Je Sang-mi, Han Da-som, Ju Hye-ri, Lee Chae-won	Cross-country skiing	Women's 4 × 5 km relay	February 24
Bronze	Hwang Jun-ho, Park Seong-beom, Kim Min-woo, Kim Magnus	Cross-country skiing	Men's 4 × 7.5 km relay	February 24
Bronze	Kang Young-seo	Alpine skiing	Women's slalom	February 25
Bronze	Lee Ju-chan, Choi Heung-chul, Kim Hyun-ki, Choi Seou	Ski jumping	Men's team	February 25

== Competitors ==
The following table lists the South Korean delegation per sport and gender.

Sport	Men	Women	Total
Alpine skiing	5	5	10
Biathlon	5	5	10
Cross-country skiing	5	5	10
Curling	5	4	9
Figure skating	5	4	9
Freestyle skiing	3	2	5
Ice hockey	23	20	43
Short track speed skating	5	5	10
Ski jumping	5	—N/a	5
Snowboarding	8	4	12
Speed skating	9	9	18
Total	78	63	141

== Alpine skiing ==
South Korea sent 10 athletes (5 men and 5 women) to compete in the alpine skiing event.

Men

Athlete	Event	Final	
Athlete	Event	Time	Rank
Hong Dong-kwan	Giant slalom		
Hong Dong-kwan	Slalom		
Jung Dong-hyun	Giant slalom		
Jung Dong-hyun	Slalom		
Kim Hyeon-tae	Giant slalom		
Kim Hyeon-tae	Slalom		
Kyung Sung-hyun	Giant slalom		
Kyung Sung-hyun	Slalom		
Park Je-yun	Giant slalom		
Park Je-yun	Slalom		

Women

Athlete	Event	Final	
Athlete	Event	Time	Rank
Choe Jeong-hyeon	Giant slalom		
Choe Jeong-hyeon	Slalom		
Gim So-hui	Giant slalom		
Gim So-hui	Slalom		
Kang Young-seo	Giant slalom		
Kang Young-seo	Slalom		
Noh Jin-soul	Giant slalom		
Noh Jin-soul	Slalom		
Rim Seung-hyun	Giant slalom		
Rim Seung-hyun	Slalom		

== Biathlon ==
South Korea sent 10 athletes (5 men and 5 women) to compete in the biathlon event.

Men

Athlete	Event	Final	
Athlete	Event	Time	Rank
Heo Seon-hoe	Sprint		
Heo Seon-hoe	Pursuit		
Heo Seon-hoe	Mass start		
Jun Je-uk	Sprint		
Jun Je-uk	Pursuit		
Jun Je-uk	Mass start		
Kim Jong-min	Sprint		
Kim Jong-min	Pursuit		
Kim Jong-min	Mass start		
Kim Yong-gyu	Sprint		
Kim Yong-gyu	Pursuit		
Kim Yong-gyu	Mass start		
Lee In-bok	Sprint		
Lee In-bok	Pursuit		
Lee In-bok	Mass start		

Women

Athlete	Event	Final	
Athlete	Event	Time	Rank
Hwang Hye-suk	Sprint		
Hwang Hye-suk	Pursuit		
Hwang Hye-suk	Mass start		
Jung Ju-mi	Sprint		
Jung Ju-mi	Pursuit		
Jung Ju-mi	Mass start		
Ko Eun-jung	Sprint		
Ko Eun-jung	Pursuit		
Ko Eun-jung	Mass start		
Mun Ji-hee	Sprint		
Mun Ji-hee	Pursuit		
Mun Ji-hee	Mass start		
Park Ji-ae	Sprint		
Park Ji-ae	Pursuit		
Park Ji-ae	Mass start		

Mixed

Athlete	Event	Final	
Athlete	Event	Time	Rank
	Relay		

== Cross-country skiing ==
Men

- Kim Magnus

== Curling ==
South Korea has entered both a men's and women's teams.

=== Men's tournament ===
- Kim Soo-hyuk – Skip
- Park Jong-duk – Third
- Kim Tae-hwan – Second
- Nam Yoon-ho – Lead
- Yoo Min-hyeon – Alternate

Key
Teams to playoffs

Country	Skip	W	L
China	Liu Rui	5	0
South Korea	Kim Soo-hyuk	4	1
Japan	Yusuke Morozumi	3	2
Chinese Taipei	Randolph Shen	2	3
Kazakhstan	Viktor Kim	1	4
Qatar	Nabeel Alyafei	0	5

Round-robin

South Korea has a bye in draw 3

Draw 1

Saturday, February 18, 9:00

Sheet C	1	2	3	4	5	6	7	8	9	10	Final
South Korea (Soo-hyuk)	3	3	3	3	3	2	3	x	x	x	20
Qatar (Alyafei)	0	0	0	0	0	0	0	x	x	x	0

Draw 2

Saturday, February 18, 18:00

Sheet A	1	2	3	4	5	6	7	8	9	10	Final
South Korea (Soo-hyuk)	2	0	1	1	0	3	3	2	X	X	12
Kazakhstan (Kim)	0	1	0	0	0	0	0	0	X	X	1

Draw 4

Monday, February 20, 13:30

Sheet B	1	2	3	4	5	6	7	8	9	10	Final
Chinese Taipei (Shen)	0	0	0	0	2	0	0	1	0	0	3
South Korea (Soo-hyuk)	0	0	2	0	0	0	2	0	1	2	7

Draw 5

Tuesday, February 21, 9:00

Sheet B	1	2	3	4	5	6	7	8	9	10	Final
South Korea (Soo-hyuk)	0	0	0	0	2	0	1	0	X	X	3
China (Rui)	0	1	1	1	0	3	0	2	X	X	8

Draw 6

Tuesday, February 21, 18:00

Sheet C	1	2	3	4	5	6	7	8	9	10	Final
Japan (Morozumi)	0	1	0	0	2	0	1	0	X	X	4
South Korea (Soo-hyuk)	2	0	2	1	0	2	0	1	X	X	8

Semifinals

Wednesday, February 22, 1:30

Sheet A	1	2	3	4	5	6	7	8	9	10	Final
Japan (Morozumi)	1	1	0	1	0	2	0	0	0	1	6
South Korea (Soo-hyuk)	0	0	1	0	2	0	2	0	0	0	5

Bronze medal match

Thursday, February 23, 1:30

Sheet C	1	2	3	4	5	6	7	8	9	10	Final
Chinese Taipei (Shen)	0	0	2	0	0	1	0	2	X	X	5
South Korea (Soo-hyuk) (bronze)	3	0	0	0	1	0	6	0	X	X	10

=== Women's tournament ===
- Kim Eun-jung – Skip
- Kim Kyeong-ae – Third
- Kim Seon-yeong – Second
- Kim Yeong-mi – Lead

Key
Teams to playoffs

Country	Skip	W	L
South Korea	Kim Eun-jung	4	0
China	Wang Bingyu	3	1
Japan	Satsuki Fujisawa	2	2
Kazakhstan	Ramina Yunicheva	1	3
Qatar	Maryam Binali	0	4

Round-robin

South Korea has a bye in draw 1

Draw 2

Saturday, February 19, 9:00

Sheet A	1	2	3	4	5	6	7	8	9	10	Final
Qatar (Binali)	0	0	0	1	0	0	0	1	X	X	2
South Korea (Eun-jung)	4	5	4	0	4	6	1	0	X	X	24

Draw 3

Sunday, February 20, 9:00

Sheet A	1	2	3	4	5	6	7	8	9	10	Final
South Korea (Eun-jung)	0	2	2	0	0	1	0	2	0	1	8
China (Wang)	1	0	0	1	1	0	0	0	3	0	6

Draw 4

Monday, February 20, 18:00

Sheet C	1	2	3	4	5	6	7	8	9	10	Final
Japan (Fujisawa)	0	1	1	0	0	1	0	0	2	0	5
South Korea (Eun-jung)	1	0	0	1	2	0	1	1	0	1	7

Draw 5

Tuesday, February 21, 13:30

Sheet B	1	2	3	4	5	6	7	8	9	10	Final
South Korea (Eun-jung)	0	0	0	0	0	0	0	0	0	0	0
Kazakhstan (Yunicheva)	0	0	0	0	0	0	0	0	0	0	0

== Figure skating ==
Men's single

Athlete(s)	Event	SP		FS		Total	
Athlete(s)	Event	Points	Rank	Points	Rank	Points	Rank
Lee June-hyoung	Singles	57.67	13	126.76	11	184.43	12
Kim Jin-seo	Singles	76.99	6	151.68	7	228.67	7

Women's single

Athlete(s)	Event	SP		FS		Total	
Athlete(s)	Event	Points	Rank	Points	Rank	Points	Rank
Choi Da-bin	Singles	61.30	1	126.24	1	187.54	1st place, gold medalist(s)
Kim Na-hyun	Singles	40.80	13	67.97	13	108.77	13

Pairs

Athlete(s)	Event	SP		FS		Total	
Athlete(s)	Event	Points	Rank	Points	Rank	Points	Rank
Kim Kyu-eun / Kam Kang-chan	Pairs	46.64	6	95.24	5	141.88	5
Kim Su-yeon / Kim Hyung-tae	Pairs	49.28	4	100.12	4	149.40	4

Ice dancing

Athlete(s)	Event	SD		FD		Total	
Athlete(s)	Event	Points	Rank	Points	Rank	Points	Rank
Lee Ho-jung / Kam Kang-in	Ice dancing	51.56	4	79.66	4	131.22	4

== Ice hockey ==
South Korea has entered teams in both hockey tournaments. The men's team will compete in the top division.

=== Men's tournament ===
South Korea was represented by the following 23 athletes:

- Matt Dalton (G)
- Kyehoon Park (G)
- Sunje Park (G)
- Lee Donku (D)
- Oh Hyunho (D)
- Eric Regan (D)
- Kim Wonjun (D)
- Seo Yeongjun (D)
- Kim Yoon-Hwan (D)
- Bryan Young (D)
- Cho Minho (F)
- Shin Hyungyun (F)
- Chong Hyun Lee (F)
- Jeon Jungwoo (F)
- Jin Kyu Park (F)
- Shin Sanghoon (F)
- Shin Sangwoo (F)
- Kim Ki-Sung (F)
- Michael Swift (F)
- Mike Testwuide (F)
- Kim Sang-Wook (F)
- Park Woosang (F)
- Kim Wonjung (F)

Legend

- G– Goalie D = Defense F = Forward

Rank	Team	Pld	W	OW	OL	L	GF	GA	GD	Pts
1st place, gold medalist(s)	Kazakhstan	3	3	0	0	0	19	0	+19	9
2nd place, silver medalist(s)	South Korea	3	2	0	0	1	14	6	+8	6
3rd place, bronze medalist(s)	Japan	3	1	0	0	2	15	11	+4	3
4	China	3	0	0	0	3	0	32	–32	0

22 February 2017; 15:30	South Korea	0–4 (0–0, 0–2, 0–2)	Kazakhstan	Tsukisamu Gymnasium; Attendance: 513

Game reference
14 min	Penalties	8 min
29	Shots	27

24 February 2017; 19:00	Japan	1–4 (0–1, 0–1, 1–2)	South Korea	Tsukisamu Gymnasium; Attendance: 2,118

Game reference
8 min	Penalties	6 min
28	Shots	32

26 February 2017; 9:00	China	0–10 (0–2, 0–4, 0–4)	South Korea	Tsukisamu Gymnasium; Attendance: 344

Game reference
12 min	Penalties	0 min
14	Shots	66

=== Women's tournament ===
South Korea was represented by the following 20 athletes:

- Han Do-hee (G)
- Shin So-jung (G)
- Eom Su-yeon (D)
- Lee Kyou-sun (D)
- Kim Se-lin (D)
- Park Ye-eun (D)
- Cho Mi-hwan (D)
- Ko Hye-in (F)
- Caroline Nancy Park (F)
- Choi Yu-jung (F)
- Park Jong-ah (F)
- Choi Ji-yeon (F)
- Kim Hee-won (F)
- Lee Eun-ji (F)
- Park Chae-lin (F)
- Jo Su-sie (F)
- Han Soo-jin (F)
- Lee Min-ji (F)
- Lee Yeon-jeong (F)
- Jung Si-yun (F)

Legend: G = Goalie, D = Defense, F = Forward

Rank	Team	Pld	W	OW	OL	L	GF	GA	GD	Pts
1st place, gold medalist(s)	Japan	5	5	0	0	0	98	1	+97	15
2nd place, silver medalist(s)	China	5	3	0	1	1	46	12	+34	10
3rd place, bronze medalist(s)	Kazakhstan	5	3	0	0	2	31	14	+17	9
4	South Korea	5	2	1	0	2	37	6	+31	8
5	Thailand	5	1	0	0	4	5	84	–79	3
6	Hong Kong	5	0	0	0	5	4	104	–100	0

18 February 2017; 15:30	Thailand	0–20 (0–7, 0–7, 0–6)	South Korea	Tsukisamu Gymnasium; Attendance: 360

Game reference
			Referee: (United Kingdom) Deana Cuglietta; Linesmen: (Norway) Anette Fjeldstad (Switzerland) Cindy Naef
4 min	Penalties	4 min	Referee: (United Kingdom) Deana Cuglietta; Linesmen: (Norway) Anette Fjeldstad (Switzerland) Cindy Naef
1	Shots	108	Referee: (United Kingdom) Deana Cuglietta; Linesmen: (Norway) Anette Fjeldstad (Switzerland) Cindy Naef

20 February 2017; 19:00	Japan	3–0 (1–0, 0–0, 2–0)	South Korea	Tsukisamu Gymnasium; Attendance: 1,221

Game reference
12 min	Penalties	6 min
47	Shots	19

21 February 2017; 15:30	Kazakhstan	1–0 (0–0, 0–0, 1–0)	South Korea	Tsukisamu Gymnasium; Attendance: 292

Game reference
10 min	Penalties	2 min
21	Shots	30

23 February 2017; 12:00	South Korea	3–2 (1–1, 1–1, 0–0, 0–0, 1–0)	China	Tsukisamu Gymnasium; Attendance: 351

Game reference
10 min	Penalties	8 min
25	Shots	29

25 February 2017; 15:30	South Korea	14–0 (9–0, 5–0, 0–0)	Hong Kong	Tsukisamu Gymnasium; Attendance: 508

Game reference
6 min	Penalties	4 min
59	Shots	0

== Short track speed skating ==
Men

- Lee Jung-su

== Snowboarding ==
Men

Athlete	Event	Run 1		Run 2		Total	
Athlete	Event	Time	Rank	Time	Rank	Time	Rank
Choi Bo-gun	Giant slalom	52.02	2	44.42	3	1:36.44	2nd place, silver medalist(s)
Choi Bo-gun	Slalom	41.27	4	36.70	6	1:17.97	4
Ji Myung-kon	Giant slalom	52.27	3	45.24	8	1:37.51	4
Ji Myung-kon	Slalom	43.39	9	36.63	5	1:20.02	7
Kim Sang-kyum	Giant slalom	53.13	4	45.02	5	1:38.15	5
Kim Sang-kyum	Slalom	41.67	5	35.75	1	1:17.42	3rd place, bronze medalist(s)
Lee Sang-ho	Giant slalom	51.94	1	43.82	2	1:35.72	1st place, gold medalist(s)
Lee Sang-ho	Slalom	39.80	1	36.29	4	1:16.09	1st place, gold medalist(s)

Women

Athlete	Event	Run 1		Run 2		Total	
Athlete	Event	Time	Rank	Time	Rank	Time	Rank
Jeong Hae-rim	Giant slalom	59.67	5	48.46	2	1:48.13	4
Jeong Hae-rim	Slalom	46.69	6	40.24	4	1:26.93	4
Shin Da-hae	Giant slalom	59.06	4	49.60	5	1:48.66	5
Shin Da-hae	Slalom	46.20	5	40.22	3	1:26.42	3rd place, bronze medalist(s)

== Speed skating ==
South Korea's speed skating team consists of twenty athletes (10 men and 10 women).

Men

- Cha Min-kyu
- Mo Tae-bum
- Kim Jin-su
- Jang Won-hoon
- Kim Min-seok
- Joo Hyong-jun
- Lee Seung-hoon
- Lee Jin-yeong
- Kim Cheol-min

Women

- Lee Sang-hwa
- Kim Min-sun
- Park Seung-hi
- Kim Hyun-yung
- Kim Bo-reum
- Park Ji-woo
- Noh Seon-yeong
- Jang Su-ji
- Park Do-young
