= Kazakhstan at the 2017 Asian Winter Games =

- IOC code: KAZ
- NOC: National Olympic Committee of the Republic of Kazakhstan

in Sapporo and Obihiro February 19–26
- Competitors: 116 in 11 sports
- Flag bearer: Yerdos Akhmadiyev
- Medals Ranked 4th: Gold 9 Silver 11 Bronze 12 Total 32

Asian Winter Games appearances
- 1996; 1999; 2003; 2007; 2011; 2017; 2025; 2029

Kazakhstan competed in the 2017 Asian Winter Games in Sapporo and Obihiro, Japan from February 19 to 26. Kazakhstan competed in all five sports (eleven disciplines). The team consists of 116 athletes and was announced on January 17.

Also on January 17 in conjunction with the team announcement, cross-country skier Yerdos Akhmadiyev was announced as the country's flagbearer during the parade of nations at the opening ceremony. Akhmadiyev also served as the country's flagbearer at the 2014 Winter Olympics in Sochi, Russia.

== Medal summary ==
=== Medal table ===
| Sport | Gold | Silver | Bronze | Total |
|---|---|---|---|---|
| Biathlon | 6 | 4 | 2 | 12 |
| Cross-country skiing | 1 | 4 | 2 | 7 |
| Freestyle skiing | 1 | 1 | 2 | 4 |
| Ice hockey | 1 | 0 | 1 | 2 |
| Ski jumping | 0 | 1 | 2 | 3 |
| Speed skating | 0 | 1 | 1 | 2 |
| Figure skating | 0 | 0 | 1 | 1 |
| Short track speed skating | 0 | 0 | 1 | 1 |
| Totals (8 entries) | 9 | 11 | 12 | 32 |

=== Medalists ===
| Medal | Name | Sport | Event | Date |
|---|---|---|---|---|
| Gold | Rinat Mukhin | Cross-country skiing | Men's 15 kilometre freestyle | 21 February |
| Gold | Yan Savitskiy | Biathlon | Men's 10 km sprint | 23 February |
| Gold | Galina Vishnevskaya | Biathlon | Women's 7.5 km sprint | 23 February |
| Gold | Galina Vishnevskaya | Biathlon | Women's 10 km pursuit | 24 February |
| Gold | Yuliya Galysheva | Freestyle skiing | Women's dual moguls | 24 February |
| Gold | Galina Vishnevskaya; Darya Ussanova; Maxim Braun; Yan Savitskiy | Biathlon | Mixed relay | 25 February |
| Gold | Yan Savitskiy | Biathlon | Men's 15 km mass start | 26 February |
| Gold | Galina Vishnevskaya | Biathlon | Women's 12.5 km mass start | 26 February |
| Gold | Kazakhstan men's national ice hockey team | Ice hockey | Men's tournament | 26 February |
| Silver | Yelena Kolomina | Cross-country skiing | Women's sprint | 20 February |
| Silver | Denis Kuzin | Speed skating | Men's 1000 metres | 21 February |
| Silver | Vassiliy Podkorytov | Biathlon | Men's 10 km sprint | 23 February |
| Silver | Yelena Kolomina | Cross-country skiing | Women's 5 km classical | 23 February |
| Silver | Yan Savitskiy | Biathlon | Men's 12.5 km pursuit | 24 February |
| Silver | Sergey Cherepanov; Yerdos Akhmadiyev; Nikolay Chebotko; Rinat Mukhin | Cross-country skiing | Men's 4 x 7.5 km relay | 24 February |
| Silver | Alina Raikova; Anna Kistanova; Vassiliy Podkorytov; Anton Pantov | Biathlon | Mixed relay | 25 February |
| Silver | Sabirzhan Muminov; Konstantin Sokolenko; Marat Zhaparov; Sergey Tkachenko | Ski jumping | Men's large hill team | 25 February |
| Silver | Alina Raikova | Biathlon | Women's 12.5 km mass start | 26 February |
| Silver | Yuliya Galysheva | Cross-country skiing | Men's 30 km freestyle mass start | 26 February |
| Silver | Sergey Cherepanov | Freestyle skiing | Women's moguls | 26 February |
| Bronze | Yelena Kolomina | Cross-country skiing | Women's 10 kilometre freestyle | 21 February |
| Bronze | Sergey Tkachenko | Ski jumping | Men's normal hill | 21 February |
| Bronze | Iong A Kim; Anastassiya Krestova; Madina Zhanbussinova; Anita Nagay | Short track speed skating | Women's 3000 m relay | 22 February |
| Bronze | Dmitry Babenko; Denis Kuzin; Fyodor Mezentsev | Speed skating | Men's Team pursuit | 22 February |
| Bronze | Alina Raikova | Biathlon | Women's 7.5 km sprint | 23 February |
| Bronze | Darya Ussanova | Biathlon | Women's 10 km pursuit | 24 February |
| Bronze | Dmitriy Reikherd | Freestyle skiing | Men's dual moguls | 24 February |
| Bronze | Marat Zhaparov | Ski jumping | Men's large hill | 24 February |
| Bronze | Elizabet Tursynbayeva | Figure skating | Ladies singles | 25 February |
| Bronze | Kazakhstan women's national ice hockey team | Ice hockey | Women's tournament | 25 February |
| Bronze | Nikolay Chebotko | Cross-country skiing | Men's 30 km freestyle mass start | 26 February |
| Bronze | Dmitriy Reikherd | Freestyle skiing | Men's moguls | 26 February |

== Competitors ==
The following table lists the Kazakh delegation per sport and gender.

| Sport | Men | Women | Total |
|---|---|---|---|
| Alpine skiing | 2 | 2 | 4 |
| Biathlon | 5 | 5 | 10 |
| Cross-country skiing | 6 | 6 | 12 |
| Curling | 5 | 5 | 10 |
| Figure skating | 2 | 2 | 4 |
| Freestyle skiing | 3 | 1 | 4 |
| Ice hockey | 23 | 21 | 44 |
| Short track speed skating | 5 | 5 | 10 |
| Ski jumping | 4 | —N/a | 4 |
| Snowboarding | 2 | 2 | 4 |
| Speed skating | 6 | 4 | 10 |
| Total | 63 | 53 | 116 |

== Alpine skiing ==
Kazakhstan's alpine skiing team consists of four athletes (two men and two women).

Men

- Igor Zakurdayev
- Martin Khuber

Women

- Yekaterina Karpova
- Mariya Grigorova

== Biathlon ==
Kazakhstan's biathlon team consists of ten athletes (five men and five women).

Men

- Maxim Braun
- Anton Pantov
- Vassiliy Podkorytov
- Yan Savitskiy
- Vladislav Vitenko

Women

- Anna Kistanova
- Olga Poltoranina
- Darya Usanova
- Galina Vishnevskaya
- Alina Raikova

== Cross-country skiing ==
Kazakhstan's cross-country skiing team consists of twelve athletes (six men and six women).

Men

- Yerdos Akhmadiyev
- Nikolay Chebotko
- Alexandr Malyshev
- Sergey Malyshev
- Rinat Mukhin
- Sergey Cherepanov

Women

- Tamara Ebel
- Yelena Kolomina
- Marina Matrossova
- Darya Ryazhko
- Angelina Shuryga
- Anzhelika Tarassova

== Curling ==
Kazakhstan has entered both a men's and women's teams, each consists of five athletes, for a total of ten.

=== Men's tournament ===
- Viktor Kim – skip
- Abylaikhan Zhuzbay – third
- Dimitriy Garagul – second
- Muzdybay Kudaibergenov – lead
- Abilay Nurumbetov – alternate

Key
| Teams to playoffs |

| Country | Skip | W | L |
|---|---|---|---|
| China | Liu Rui | 5 | 0 |
| South Korea | Kim Soo-hyuk | 4 | 1 |
| Japan | Yusuke Morozumi | 3 | 2 |
| Chinese Taipei | Randolph Shen | 2 | 3 |
| Kazakhstan | Viktor Kim | 1 | 4 |
| Qatar | Nabeel Alyafei | 0 | 5 |

Round-robin

Kazakhstan has a bye in draw 3

Draw 1

Saturday, February 18, 9:00

| Sheet B | 1 | 2 | 3 | 4 | 5 | 6 | 7 | 8 | 9 | 10 | Final |
|---|---|---|---|---|---|---|---|---|---|---|---|
| China (Rui) | 1 | 2 | 1 | 3 | 2 | 0 | 1 | 1 | 1 | X | 12 |
| Kazakhstan (Kim) | 0 | 0 | 0 | 0 | 0 | 1 | 0 | 0 | 0 | X | 1 |

Draw 2

Saturday, February 18, 18:00

| Sheet A | 1 | 2 | 3 | 4 | 5 | 6 | 7 | 8 | 9 | 10 | Final |
|---|---|---|---|---|---|---|---|---|---|---|---|
| South Korea (Soo-hyuk) | 2 | 0 | 1 | 1 | 0 | 3 | 3 | 2 | X | X | 12 |
| Kazakhstan (Kim) | 0 | 1 | 0 | 0 | 0 | 0 | 0 | 0 | X | X | 1 |

Draw 4

Monday, February 20, 13:30

| Sheet C | 1 | 2 | 3 | 4 | 5 | 6 | 7 | 8 | 9 | 10 | Final |
|---|---|---|---|---|---|---|---|---|---|---|---|
| Qatar (Alyafei) | 0 | 0 | 1 | 1 | 0 | 1 | 0 | 1 | 0 | 0 | 4 |
| Kazakhstan (Kim) | 0 | 1 | 0 | 0 | 4 | 0 | 2 | 0 | 4 | 1 | 12 |

Draw 5

Tuesday, February 21, 9:00

| Sheet C | 1 | 2 | 3 | 4 | 5 | 6 | 7 | 8 | 9 | 10 | Final |
|---|---|---|---|---|---|---|---|---|---|---|---|
| Kazakhstan (Kim) | 0 | 0 | 1 | 0 | 0 | 0 | 3 | 0 | X | X | 4 |
| Japan (Morozumi) | 3 | 3 | 0 | 2 | 1 | 1 | 0 | 3 | X | X | 13 |

Draw 6

Tuesday, February 21, 18:00

| Sheet B | 1 | 2 | 3 | 4 | 5 | 6 | 7 | 8 | 9 | 10 | Final |
|---|---|---|---|---|---|---|---|---|---|---|---|
| Kazakhstan (Kim) | 0 | 0 | 0 | 0 | 1 | 0 | 0 | 1 | 0 | X | 2 |
| Chinese Taipei (Shen) | 0 | 3 | 2 | 1 | 0 | 2 | 3 | 0 | 2 | X | 13 |

=== Women's tournament ===
The women's team consists of five athletes.

- Ramina Yunicheva – skip
- Anastassiya Surgay – third
- Kamila Bakanova – second
- Diana Torkina – lead
- Sitora Alliyarova – alternate

Key
| Teams to playoffs |

| Country | Skip | W | L |
|---|---|---|---|
| South Korea | Kim Eun-jung | 4 | 0 |
| China | Wang Bingyu | 3 | 1 |
| Japan | Satsuki Fujisawa | 2 | 2 |
| Kazakhstan | Ramina Yunicheva | 1 | 3 |
| Qatar | Maryam Binali | 0 | 4 |

Round-robin

Kazakhstan has a bye in draw 4

Draw 1

Saturday, February 18, 13:30

| Sheet C | 1 | 2 | 3 | 4 | 5 | 6 | 7 | 8 | 9 | 10 | Final |
|---|---|---|---|---|---|---|---|---|---|---|---|
| Kazakhstan (Yunicheva) | 0 | 0 | 1 | 0 | 0 | 0 | 1 | X | X | X | 2 |
| China (Wang) | 6 | 1 | 0 | 7 | 1 | 5 | 0 | X | X | X | 20 |

Draw 2

Saturday, February 19, 9:00

| Sheet B | 1 | 2 | 3 | 4 | 5 | 6 | 7 | 8 | 9 | 10 | Final |
|---|---|---|---|---|---|---|---|---|---|---|---|
| Kazakhstan (Yunicheva) | 1 | 0 | 0 | 0 | 0 | 1 | 0 | 1 | 0 | X | 3 |
| Japan (Fujisawa) | 0 | 4 | 1 | 3 | 2 | 0 | 2 | 0 | 5 | X | 17 |

Draw 3

Sunday, February 20, 9:00

| Sheet C | 1 | 2 | 3 | 4 | 5 | 6 | 7 | 8 | 9 | 10 | Final |
|---|---|---|---|---|---|---|---|---|---|---|---|
| Qatar (Binali) | 0 | 1 | 0 | 1 | 0 | 0 | 0 | 0 | X | X | 2 |
| Kazakhstan (Yunicheva) | 2 | 0 | 1 | 0 | 4 | 2 | 2 | 3 | X | X | 14 |

Draw 5

Tuesday, February 21, 13:30

| Sheet B | 1 | 2 | 3 | 4 | 5 | 6 | 7 | 8 | 9 | 10 | Final |
|---|---|---|---|---|---|---|---|---|---|---|---|
| South Korea (Eun-jung) | 0 | 0 | 0 | 0 | 0 | 0 | 0 | 0 | 0 | 0 | 0 |
| Kazakhstan (Yunicheva) | 0 | 0 | 0 | 0 | 0 | 0 | 0 | 0 | 0 | 0 | 0 |

== Figure skating ==
Kazakhstan's figure skating team consists of four athletes (two men and two women).

Singles

| Athlete(s) | Event | SP | | FP | | Total | |
| Athlete(s) | Event | Points | Rank | Points | Rank | Points | Rank |
|---|---|---|---|---|---|---|---|
| Abzal Rakimgaliev | Men's | 54.80 | 14 | 134.79 | 7 | 189.59 | 12 |
| Denis Ten | Men's | 72.98 | 9 | 125.90 | 13 | 198.88 | 10 |
| Aiza Mambekova | Women's | 49.99 | 8 | 82.65 | 10 | 132.64 | 8 |
| Elizabet Tursynbayeva | Women's | 53.16 | 6 | 121.88 | 2 | 175.04 | 3rd place, bronze medalist(s) |

== Freestyle skiing ==
Kazakhstan's freestyle skiing team consists of four athletes (three men and one woman).

Men

- Dmitriy Barmashov
- Dmitry Reiherd
- Oleg Tsinn

Woman

- Ayaulum Amrenova

== Ice hockey ==
Kazakhstan has entered teams in both hockey tournaments. The men's team will compete in the top division.

=== Men's tournament ===
Kazakhstan was represented by the following 23 athletes:

- Sergei Kudryavtsev (G)
- Pavel Poluektov (G)
- Valeri Sevidov (G)
- Vladislav Grebenshchikov (D)
- Madiyar Ibraibekov (D)
- Viktor Ivashin (D)
- Aleksandr Nurek (D)
- Alexander Pisarev (D)
- Ivan Stepanenko (D)
- Stanislav Zinchenko (D)
- Nursultan Belgibayev (F)
- Artem Burdelev (F)
- Dmitri Grents (F)
- Artyom Likhotnikov (F)
- Nikita Mikhailis (F)
- Vladislav Nikulin (F)
- Anton Petrov (F)
- Mikhail Rakhmanov (F)
- Konstantin Savenkov (F)
- Anton Sagadiev (F)
- Kirill Savitsky (F)
- Arkadi Shestakov (F)
- Yaroslav Yevdokimov (F)

Legend

- G– Goalie D = Defense-man F = Forward

| Rank | Team | Pld | W | OW | OL | L | GF | GA | GD | Pts |
|---|---|---|---|---|---|---|---|---|---|---|
| 1st place, gold medalist(s) | Kazakhstan | 3 | 3 | 0 | 0 | 0 | 19 | 0 | +19 | 9 |
| 2nd place, silver medalist(s) | South Korea | 3 | 2 | 0 | 0 | 1 | 14 | 6 | +8 | 6 |
| 3rd place, bronze medalist(s) | Japan | 3 | 1 | 0 | 0 | 2 | 15 | 11 | +4 | 3 |
| 4 | China | 3 | 0 | 0 | 0 | 3 | 0 | 32 | –32 | 0 |

| 22 February 2017; 15:30 | South Korea | 0–4 (0–0, 0–2, 0–2) | Kazakhstan | Tsukisamu Gymnasium; Attendance: 513 |

Game reference
| 14 min | Penalties | 8 min |
| 29 | Shots | 27 |

| 24 February 2017; 15:30 | Kazakhstan | 8–0 (3–0, 3–0, 2–0) | China | Tsukisamu Gymnasium; Attendance: 483 |

Game reference
| 6 min | Penalties | 24 min |
| 76 | Shots | 19 |

| 26 February 2017; 12:30 | Kazakhstan | 7–0 (4–0, 2–0, 1–0) | Japan | Tsukisamu Gymnasium; Attendance: 1,631 |

Game reference
| 6 min | Penalties | 20 min |
| 41 | Shots | 12 |

=== Women's tournament ===
Kazakhstan was represented by the following 21 athletes:

- Darya Dmitriyeva (G)
- Aizhan Raushanova (G)
- Arina Schekolova (G)
- Alexandra Feklistova (D)
- Azhar Khamimuldinova (D)
- Olga Konysheva (D)
- Viktoriya Sazonova (D)
- Galiya Nurgaliyeva (D)
- Malika Aldabergenova (F)
- Pernesh Ashimova (F)
- Karina Felzink (F)
- Alena Fux (F)
- Bulbul Kartanbayeva (F)
- Tatyana Koroleva (F)
- Tatyana Likhaus (F)
- Aida Olzhabayeva (F)
- Anastasia Orlova (F)
- Meruyert Ryspek (F)
- Arai Shegebayeva (F)
- Zarina Tukhtieva (F)
- Madina Tursynova (F)

Legend

- G– Goalie D = Defense-man F = Forward

| Rank | Team | Pld | W | OW | OL | L | GF | GA | GD | Pts |
|---|---|---|---|---|---|---|---|---|---|---|
| 1st place, gold medalist(s) | Japan | 5 | 5 | 0 | 0 | 0 | 98 | 1 | +97 | 15 |
| 2nd place, silver medalist(s) | China | 5 | 3 | 0 | 1 | 1 | 46 | 12 | +34 | 10 |
| 3rd place, bronze medalist(s) | Kazakhstan | 5 | 3 | 0 | 0 | 2 | 31 | 14 | +17 | 9 |
| 4 | South Korea | 5 | 2 | 1 | 0 | 2 | 37 | 6 | +31 | 8 |
| 5 | Thailand | 5 | 1 | 0 | 0 | 4 | 5 | 84 | –79 | 3 |
| 6 | Hong Kong | 5 | 0 | 0 | 0 | 5 | 4 | 104 | –100 | 0 |

| 18 February 2017; 12:00 | Kazakhstan | 0–6 (0–2, 0–3, 0–1) | Japan | Tsukisamu Gymnasium; Attendance: 2,200 |

Game reference
| | | | Referee: (Germany) Tijana Haack; Linesmen: (Austria) Julia Kainberger (South Korea) Lee Tae-ri |
| 12 min | Penalties | 4 min | Referee: (Germany) Tijana Haack; Linesmen: (Austria) Julia Kainberger (South Korea) Lee Tae-ri |
| 3 | Shots | 58 | Referee: (Germany) Tijana Haack; Linesmen: (Austria) Julia Kainberger (South Korea) Lee Tae-ri |

| 20 February 2017; 15:30 | China | 8–3 (2–1, 3–1, 3–1) | Kazakhstan | Tsukisamu Gymnasium; Attendance: 323 |

Game reference
| 6 min | Penalties | 10 min |
| 39 | Shots | 21 |

| 21 February 2017; 15:30 | Kazakhstan | 1–0 (0–0, 0–0, 1–0) | South Korea | Tsukisamu Gymnasium; Attendance: 292 |

Game reference
| 10 min | Penalties | 2 min |
| 21 | Shots | 30 |

| 23 February 2017; 15:30 | Hong Kong | 0–19 (0–7, 0–5, 0–7) | Kazakhstan | Tsukisamu Gymnasium; Attendance: 182 |

Game reference
| 0 min | Penalties | 8 min |
| 2 | Shots | 72 |

| 25 February 2017; 12:00 | Kazakhstan | 8–0 (5–0, 2–0, 1–0) | Thailand | Tsukisamu Gymnasium; Attendance: 337 |

Game reference
| 0 min | Penalties | 6 min |
| 75 | Shots | 0 |

== Short track speed skating ==
Kazakhstan's short track speed skating team consists of ten athletes (five men and five women).

Men

- Aidar Bekzhanov
- Adil Galiakhmetov
- Nurtilek Kazhgali
- Yerkebulan Shamukhanov
- Mersaid Zhaksybaev

Women

- Iong A Kim
- Anastassiya Krestova
- Anita Nagay
- Olga Tikhonova
- Madina Zhanbussinova

== Ski jumping ==
Kazakhstan's ski jumping team consists of four male athletes.

Men

- Marat Zhaparov
- Sabirzhan Muminov
- Sergey Tkachenko
- Konstantin Sokolenko

== Snowboarding ==
Kazakhstan's snowboarding skiing team consists of four athletes (two men and two women). All four will compete in the alpine events.

| Athlete | Event | Run 1 | | Run 2 | | Total | |
| Athlete | Event | Time | Rank | Time | Rank | Time | Rank |
|---|---|---|---|---|---|---|---|
| Rollan Sadykov | Men's giant slalom | 56.77 | 15 | 47.91 | 15 | 1:44.68 | 14 |
| Rollan Sadykov | Men's slalom | 49.12 | 18 | 41.58 | 14 | 1:30.70 | 14 |
| Vladislav Zuyev | Men's giant slalom | 59.95 | 18 | 49.37 | 16 | 1:49.32 | 16 |
| Vladislav Zuyev | Men's slalom | 49.12 | 18 | 41.58 | 14 | 1:30.70 | 14 |
| Dariya Slobodkina | Women's giant slalom | 1:05.86 | 9 | 57.66 | 10 | 2:03.52 | 10 |
| Dariya Slobodkina | Women's slalom | 48.93 | 17 | 40.32 | 13 | 1:29.25 | 12 |
| Xeniya Tupik | Women's giant slalom | 1:07.06 | 11 | 55.56 | 9 | 2:02.62 | 9 |
| Xeniya Tupik | Women's slalom | 52.71 | 11 | 47.06 | 11 | 1:39.77 | 11 |

== Speed skating ==
Kazakhstan's speed skating team consists of ten athletes (six men and four women).

Men

- Dmitry Babenko
- Artem Krikunov
- Roman Krech
- Denis Kuzin
- Fyodor Mezentsev
- Stanislav Palkin

Women

- Yekaterina Aydova
- Nadezhda Sidelnik
- Mariya Sizova
- Elena Urvanceva
