= China at the 2017 Asian Winter Games =

- IOC code: CHN
- NOC: Chinese Olympic Committee

in Sapporo and Obihiro February 19–26
- Competitors: 156 in 5 sports
- Flag bearer: Wu Dajing
- Medals Ranked 3rd: Gold 12 Silver 14 Bronze 9 Total 35

Asian Winter Games appearances
- 1986; 1990; 1996; 1999; 2003; 2007; 2011; 2017; 2025; 2029

China participated in the 2017 Asian Winter Games in Sapporo and Obihiro, Japan, from February 19 to 26. China competed in all five sports (eleven disciplines). The Chinese delegation consisted of 236 people (156 athletes and 79 officials).

Short track speed skater Wu Dajing was the country's flagbearer during the parade of nations at the opening ceremony.

== Background ==
One of the athletes' hotels was the APA Hotel in Sapporo. The founder and president of this hotel chain, Toshio Motoya, is a strong supporter of political and historical views aligned with those of Japan's right wing. For example, Motoya claimed that "Japanese aggression, the Nanking Massacre, and comfort women" were "fabricated stories" or "fictitious". His book is available in each of the guest rooms at the hotel. This created controversy, particularly in China, which caused the games organizers to ask the hotel to take appropriate actions and remove them from guest rooms. The Organizing Committee gained exclusive access over the hotel from February 12, and an organization committee official said, "we can decide what is removed and placed in the guest rooms so that we don’t place any items that offend athletes, from not only China, but also any other nation”. Eventually, both South Korea and China requested that their athletes stay at a different hotel, and the organizing committee obliged by changing their accommodations to the Sapporo Prince Hotel.

== Medal summary ==
=== Medal table ===
Sport	Gold	Silver	Bronze	Total
Short track speed skating	3	2	1	6
Snowboarding	3	2	1	6
Figure skating	2	3	2	7
Curling	2	0	0	2
Cross-country skiing	1	2	2	5
Speed skating	1	1	3	5
Biathlon	0	3	0	3
Ice hockey	0	1	0	1
Totals (8 entries)	12	14	9	35

=== Medalists ===
Medal	Name	Sport	Event	Date
Gold	Man Dandan	Cross-country skiing	Women's sprint	20 February
Gold	Zang Ruxin	Snowboarding	Women's slalom	20 February
Gold	Gao Tingyu	Speed skating	Men's 500 metres	20 February
Gold	Wu Dajing	Short track speed skating	Men's 500 metres	21 February
Gold	Zang Yize	Short track speed skating	Women's 500 metres	21 February
Gold	Wu Dajing; Han Tianyu; Ren Ziwei; Xu Hongzhi	Short track speed skating	Men's 5000 metres relay	22 February
Gold	Wang Shiyue / Liu Xinyu	Figure skating	Ice dance	24 February
Gold	Liu Rui; Xu Xiaoming; Ba Dexin; Zang Jialiang; Zou Qiang	Curling	Men's tournament	24 February
Gold	Wang Bingyu; Wang Rui; Liu Jinli; Zhou Yan; Yang Ying	Curling	Women's tournament	24 February
Gold	Zhang Yiwei	Snowboarding	Men's halfpipe	25 February
Gold	Liu Jiayu	Snowboarding	Women's halfpipe	25 February
Gold	Yu Xiaoyu / Zhang Hao	Figure skating	Pairs	25 February
Silver	Zang Ruxin	Snowboarding	Women's giant slalom	19 February
Silver	Sun Qinghai	Cross-country skiing	Men's sprint	20 February
Silver	Wu Dajing	Short track speed skating	Men's 1500 metres	20 February
Silver	Han Mei	Speed skating	Women's 5000 metres	22 February
Silver	Fan Kexin; Qu Chunyu; Zang Yize; Guo Yihan	Short track speed skating	Women's 3000 metres relay	22 February
Silver	Zhang Yan	Biathlon	Women's 7.5 km sprint	23 February
Silver	Zhang Yan	Biathlon	Women's 10km Pursuit	24 February
Silver	Chi Chunxue; Li Hongxue; Li Xin; Man Dandan	Cross-country skiing	Women's 4 x 5 kilometre relay	24 February
Silver	Cai Xuetong	Snowboarding	Women's halfpipe	25 February
Silver	Peng Cheng / Jin Yang	Figure skating	Pairs	25 February
Silver	Li Zijun	Figure skating	Ladies singles	25 February
Silver	Deng Di; Fang Xin; Guan Yingying; He Siye; He Xin; Jiang Bowen; Jiang Yue; Ju Jingwen; Kong Minghui; Liu Zhixin; Lu Shuang; Lyu Yue; Tian Naiyuan; Wang Chang; Wang Yuqing; Wen Lu; Yu Baiwei; Zhang Chi; Zhang Mengying; Zhao Qinan; Zhu Rui	Ice hockey	Women's tournament	25 February
Silver	Jin Boyang	Figure skating	Men's Singles	26 February
Silver	Wang Wenqiang	Biathlon	Men's 15km Mass Start	26 February
Bronze	Gong Naiying	Snowboarding	Women's giant slalom	19 February
Bronze	Zhang Hong	Speed skating	Women's 1000 metres	20 February
Bronze	Guo Yihan	Short track speed skating	Women's 1500 metres	20 February
Bronze	Zhang Hong	Speed skating	Women's 1500 metres	21 February
Bronze	Zhao Xin; Liu Jing; Han Mei	Speed skating	Women's team pursuit	21 February
Bronze	Li Hongxue	Cross-country skiing	Women's 5km classical	23 February
Bronze	Chen Hong / Zhao Yan	Figure skating	Ice dance	24 February
Bronze	Yan Han	Figure skating	Men's Singles	26 February
Bronze	Li Hongxue	Cross-country skiing	Women's 15km Free Mass Start	26 February

== Competitors ==
The following table lists the Chinese delegation per sport and gender.

Sport	Men	Women	Total
Alpine skiing	6	5	11
Biathlon	4	5	9
Cross-country skiing	6	5	11
Curling	5	5	10
Figure skating	6	6	12
Freestyle skiing	4	4	8
Ice hockey	23	21	44
Short track speed skating	5	5	10
Ski jumping	6	—	6
Snowboarding	8	8	16
Speed skating	10	10	20
Total	83	74	157

== Curling ==
China had entered both men's and women's teams.

=== Men's tournament ===
- Liu Rui – Skip
- Xu Xiaoming – Third
- Ba Dexin – Second
- Zang Jialiang – Lead
- Zou Qiang – Alternate

Key
Teams to playoffs

Country	Skip	W	L
China	Liu Rui	5	0
South Korea	Kim Soo-hyuk	4	1
Japan	Yusuke Morozumi	3	2
Chinese Taipei	Randolph Shen	2	3
Kazakhstan	Viktor Kim	1	4
Qatar	Nabeel Alyafei	0	5

Round-robin

China had a bye in draw 2

Draw 1

Saturday, February 18, 9:00

Sheet B	1	2	3	4	5	6	7	8	9	10	Final
China (Rui)	1	2	1	3	2	0	1	1	1	X	12
Kazakhstan (Kim)	0	0	0	0	0	1	0	0	0	X	1

Draw 3

Sunday, February 19, 9:00

Sheet C	1	2	3	4	5	6	7	8	9	10	Final
China (Rui)	1	0	0	0	1	1	1	0	3	X	7
Chinese Taipei (Shen)	0	0	2	0	0	0	0	1	0	X	3

Draw 4

Monday, February 20, 13:30

Sheet A	1	2	3	4	5	6	7	8	9	10	Final
China (Rui)	2	0	2	1	0	0	1	0	2	1	9
Japan (Morozumi)	0	2	0	0	1	1	0	2	0	0	6

Draw 5

Tuesday, February 21, 9:00

Sheet B	1	2	3	4	5	6	7	8	9	10	Final
South Korea (Soo-hyuk)	0	0	0	0	2	0	1	0	X	X	3
China (Rui)	0	1	1	1	0	3	0	2	X	X	8

Draw 6

Tuesday, February 21, 18:00

Sheet A	1	2	3	4	5	6	7	8	9	10	Final
Qatar (Alyafei)	0	0	0	3	0	1	0	1	X	X	5
China (Rui)	3	4	3	0	1	0	3	0	X	X	14

Semifinals

Wednesday, February 22, 1:30

Sheet B	1	2	3	4	5	6	7	8	9	10	Final
Chinese Taipei (Shen)	0	0	0	0	1	0	0	0	0	0	1
China (Rui)	0	0	2	0	0	2	1	3	X	X	8

Gold medal match

Friday, February 24, 1:30

Sheet C	1	2	3	4	5	6	7	8	9	10	Final
China (Rui) (gold)	0	1	0	3	3	2	0	2	X	X	11
Japan (Morozumi) (silver)	1	0	1	0	0	0	2	0	X	X	4

=== Women's tournament ===
China's women's team consisted of five athletes.

- Wang Bingyu – skip
- Rui Wang – third
- Liu Jinli – second
- Zhou Yan – lead
- Yang Ying – alternate

Key
Teams to playoffs

Country	Skip	W	L
South Korea	Kim Eun-jung	4	0
China	Wang Bingyu	3	1
Japan	Satsuki Fujisawa	2	2
Kazakhstan	Ramina Yunicheva	1	3
Qatar	Maryam Binali	0	4

Round-robin

China had a bye in draw 2

Draw 1

Saturday, February 18, 13:30

Sheet C	1	2	3	4	5	6	7	8	9	10	Final
Kazakhstan (Yunicheva)	0	0	1	0	0	0	1	X	X	X	2
China (Wang)	6	1	0	7	1	5	0	X	X	X	20

Draw 3

Sunday, February 20, 9:00

Sheet A	1	2	3	4	5	6	7	8	9	10	Final
South Korea (Eun-jung)	0	2	2	0	0	1	0	2	0	1	8
China (Wang)	1	0	0	1	1	0	0	0	3	0	6

Draw 4

Monday, February 20, 18:00

Sheet B	1	2	3	4	5	6	7	8	9	10	Final
China (Wang)	4	0	5	4	5	5	X	X	X	X	23
Qatar (Binali)	0	1	0	0	0	0	X	X	X	X	1

Draw 5

Tuesday, February 21, 13:30

Sheet C	1	2	3	4	5	6	7	8	9	10	Final
China (Wang)	0	0	0	0	0	0	0	0	0	0	0
Japan (Fujisawa)	0	0	0	0	0	0	0	0	0	0	0

== Figure skating ==
China's figure skating team consisted of twelve athletes.

Singles

Athlete	Event	SP		FP		Total	
Athlete	Event	Points	Rank	Points	Rank	Points	Rank
Jin Boyang	Men's	92.86	1	187.22	2	280.08	2nd place, silver medalist(s)
Yan Han	Men's	91.56	3	180.30	3	271.86	3rd place, bronze medalist(s)
Li Zijun	Ladies	58.65	4	116.95	3	175.60	2nd place, silver medalist(s)
Zhao Ziquan	Ladies	58.90	3	79.67	10	138.57	7

Mixed

Athlete(s)	Event	SP/SD		FP/FD		Total	
Athlete(s)	Event	Points	Rank	Points	Rank	Points	Rank
Yu Xiaoyu / Zhang Hao	Pairs	77.90	1	145.98	1	223.88	1st place, gold medalist(s)
Peng Cheng / Jin Yang	Pairs	67.24	2	129.82	2	197.06	2nd place, silver medalist(s)
Wang Shiyue / Liu Xinyu	Ice dancing	66.02	1	98.26	1	164.28	1st place, gold medalist(s)
Zhao Yan / Chen Hong	Ice dancing	59.02	3	83.40	3	142.42	3rd place, bronze medalist(s)

== Ice hockey ==
China had entered teams in both hockey tournaments. The men's team competed in the top division.

=== Men's tournament ===
China was represented by the following 23 athletes:

- Sun Zehao (G)
- Xia Shengrong (G)
- Hu Tianyu (D)
- Liang Wenbin (D)
- Liu Qing (D)
- Na Yungang (D)
- Yang Mingxi (D)
- Zhang Jiaqi (D)
- Zhu Ziyang (D)
- Chen Ling (F)
- Cui Xijun (F)
- Li Hang (F)
- Li Tianhao (F)
- Li Zhengyu (F)
- Liu Wei (F)
- Liu Yongshen (F)
- Wang Chongwei (F)
- Wang Chuxiong (F)
- Xia Tianxiang (F)
- Zhang Cheng (F)
- Zhang Hao (F)
- Zhang Wenqinghuai (F)
- Zhang Zesen (F)

Legend

- G– Goalie D = Defense F = Forward

Rank	Team	Pld	W	OW	OL	L	GF	GA	GD	Pts
1st place, gold medalist(s)	Kazakhstan	3	3	0	0	0	19	0	+19	9
2nd place, silver medalist(s)	South Korea	3	2	0	0	1	14	6	+8	6
3rd place, bronze medalist(s)	Japan	3	1	0	0	2	15	11	+4	3
4	China	3	0	0	0	3	0	32	–32	0

22 February 2017; 19:00	Japan	14–0 (5–0, 4–0, 5–0)	China	Tsukisamu Gymnasium; Attendance: 1,197

Game reference
8 min	Penalties	14 min
59	Shots	9

24 February 2017; 15:30	Kazakhstan	8–0 (3–0, 3–0, 2–0)	China	Tsukisamu Gymnasium; Attendance: 483

Game reference
6 min	Penalties	24 min
76	Shots	19

26 February 2017; 9:00	China	0–10 (0–2, 0–4, 0–4)	South Korea	Tsukisamu Gymnasium; Attendance: 344

Game reference
12 min	Penalties	0 min
14	Shots	66

=== Women's tournament ===
China was represented by the following 21 athletes:

- He Siye (G)
- Wang Yuqing (G)
- Jiang Yue (G)
- Deng Di (D)
- Ju Jingwen (D)
- Liu Zhixin (D)
- Yu Baiwei (D)
- Zhao Qinan (D)
- Fang Xin (F)
- Guan Yingying (F)
- He Xin (F)
- Jiang Bowen (F)
- Kong Minghui (F)
- Lu Shuang (F)
- Lyu Yue (F)
- Tian Naiyuan (F)
- Wang Chang (F)
- Wen Lu (F)
- Zhang Chi (F)
- Zhang Mengying (F)
- Zhu Rui (F)

Legend

- G– Goalie D = Defense F = Forward

Rank	Team	Pld	W	OW	OL	L	GF	GA	GD	Pts
1st place, gold medalist(s)	Japan	5	5	0	0	0	98	1	+97	15
2nd place, silver medalist(s)	China	5	3	0	1	1	46	12	+34	10
3rd place, bronze medalist(s)	Kazakhstan	5	3	0	0	2	31	14	+17	9
4	South Korea	5	2	1	0	2	37	6	+31	8
5	Thailand	5	1	0	0	4	5	84	–79	3
6	Hong Kong	5	0	0	0	5	4	104	–100	0

18 February 2017; 19:00	China	20–0 (4–0, 8–0, 8–0)	Hong Kong	Tsukisamu Gymnasium; Attendance: 110

Game reference
			Referee: (Japan) Kuroda Anna; Linesmen: (Japan) Mizuhori Mai (South Korea) Lee Kyung-sun
6 min	Penalties	2 min	Referee: (Japan) Kuroda Anna; Linesmen: (Japan) Mizuhori Mai (South Korea) Lee Kyung-sun
78	Shots	3	Referee: (Japan) Kuroda Anna; Linesmen: (Japan) Mizuhori Mai (South Korea) Lee Kyung-sun

20 February 2017; 15:30	China	8–3 (2–1, 3–1, 3–1)	Kazakhstan	Tsukisamu Gymnasium; Attendance: 323

Game reference
6 min	Penalties	10 min
39	Shots	21

21 February 2017; 12:00	China	15–0 (7–0, 4–0, 4–0)	Thailand	Tsukisamu Gymnasium; Attendance: 184

Game reference
2 min	Penalties	4 min
74	Shots	3

23 February 2017; 12:00	South Korea	3–2 (1–1, 1–1, 0–0, 0–0, 1–0)	China	Tsukisamu Gymnasium; Attendance: 351

Game reference
10 min	Penalties	8 min
25	Shots	29

25 February 2017; 19:00	Japan	6–1 (5–0, 0–1, 1–0)	China	Tsukisamu Gymnasium; Attendance: 1,807

Game reference
4 min	Penalties	8 min
70	Shots	3

== Snowboarding ==
Alpine
Men

Athlete	Event	Run 1		Run 2		Total	
Athlete	Event	Time	Rank	Time	Rank	Time	Rank
Bi Ye	Giant slalom	53.33	5	45.10	6	1:38.43	6
Bi Ye	Slalom	40.48	2	39.08	12	1:19.56	6
Sun Huan	Giant slalom	54.52	9	46.17	10	1:40.69	9
Sun Huan	Slalom	43.84	11	36.80	7	1:20.64	8
Wu Pengtao	Giant slalom	DSQ					
Wu Pengtao	Slalom	43.65	10	38.42	10	1:22.07	10
Zhang Xuan	Giant slalom	53.64	7	45.12	7	1:38.76	7
Zhang Xuan	Slalom	42.39	7	36.14	3	1:18.53	5

Women

Athlete	Event	Run 1		Run 2		Total	
Athlete	Event	Time	Rank	Time	Rank	Time	Rank
Gong Naiying	Giant slalom	56.39	3	49.42	4	1:45.81	3rd place, bronze medalist(s)
Gong Naiying	Slalom	45.44	3	43.94	8	1:29.38	6
Niu Jiaqi	Giant slalom	DSQ					
Niu Jiaqi	Slalom	47.07	7	41.04	5	1:28.11	5
Xu Xiaoxiao	Giant slalom	1:03.57	7	49.31	3	1:52.88	6
Xu Xiaoxiao	Slalom	45.19	2	47.10	12	1:32.29	7
Zang Ruxin	Giant slalom	55.95	2	49.75	6	1:45.70	2nd place, silver medalist(s)
Zang Ruxin	Slalom	43.50	1	40.12	2	1:23.62	1st place, gold medalist(s)

Halfpipe

Athlete	Event	Qualification				Final			
Athlete	Event	Run 1	Run 2	Best	Rank	Run 1	Run 2	Best	Rank
Huang Shiying	Men's halfpipe	38.75	39.50	39.50	8	54.25	57.75	57.75	7
Xu Dechao	Men's halfpipe	40.00	38.75	40.00	7	52.00	5.75	52.00	8
Zhang Yiwei	Men's halfpipe	81.50	15.25	81.50	3	90.50	93.50	93.50	1st place, gold medalist(s)
Cai Xuetong	Women's halfpipe	65.50	26.00	65.50	7	77.50	78.50	78.50	2nd place, silver medalist(s)
Li Shuang	Women's halfpipe	59.00	6.25	59.00	8	64.25	67.25	67.25	5
Liu Jiayu	Women's halfpipe	18.75	89.25	89.25	1	93.00	68.25	93.00	1st place, gold medalist(s)
Qiu Leng	Women's halfpipe	12.00	68.25	68.25	6	30.50	62.50	62.50	6
