= List of Asian Games medalists in ski jumping =

This is the complete list of Asian Winter Games medalists in ski jumping from 2003 to 2017.

== Men ==
=== Normal hill individual ===
Games	Gold	Silver	Bronze
2003 Aomori	Kazuyoshi Funaki (JPN)	Akira Higashi (JPN)	Choi Heung-chul (KOR)
2011 Astana–Almaty	Yevgeniy Levkin (KAZ)	Kazuya Yoshioka (JPN)	Radik Zhaparov (KAZ)
2017 Sapporo	Yukiya Sato (JPN)	Yuken Iwasa (JPN)	Sergey Tkachenko (KAZ)

=== Large hill individual ===
Games	Gold	Silver	Bronze
2011 Astana–Almaty	Kazuya Yoshioka (JPN)	Kazuyoshi Funaki (JPN)	Nikolay Karpenko (KAZ)
2017 Sapporo	Naoki Nakamura (JPN)	Yuken Iwasa (JPN)	Marat Zhaparov (KAZ)

=== Normal hill team ===
Games	Gold	Silver	Bronze
2003 Aomori	South Korea (KOR); Kim Hyun-ki; Choi Heung-chul; Choi Yong-jik; Kang Chil-ku	Japan (JPN); Akira Higashi; Yuta Watase; Yasuhiro Shibata; Kazuyoshi Funaki	Kazakhstan (KAZ); Radik Zhaparov; Pavel Gaiduk; Maxim Polunin; Stanislav Filimonov

=== Large hill team ===
Games	Gold	Silver	Bronze
2011 Astana–Almaty	Japan (JPN); Kazuyoshi Funaki; Yuhei Sasaki; Yuta Watase; Kazuya Yoshioka	Kazakhstan (KAZ); Alexey Korolev; Radik Zhaparov; Yevgeniy Levkin; Nikolay Karpenko	South Korea (KOR); Choi Heung-chul; Kang Chil-ku; Choi Yong-jik; Kim Hyun-ki
2017 Sapporo	Japan (JPN); Yuken Iwasa; Yukiya Sato; Naoki Nakamura; Masamitsu Ito	Kazakhstan (KAZ); Sabirzhan Muminov; Konstantin Sokolenko; Marat Zhaparov; Sergey Tkachenko	South Korea (KOR); Lee Ju-chan; Choi Heung-chul; Kim Hyun-ki; Choi Seo-u
