= Ski jumping at the 2011 Asian Winter Games =

- Venue: International Ski Jump Complex
- Dates: 31 January – 4 February 2011
- Competitors: 19 from 4 nations

Ski jumping at the 2011 Asian Winter Games was held at International Ski Jump Complex in Almaty, Kazakhstan. The three events were scheduled for January 31–February 4, 2011 with three events contested — all men's.

This was the second time ski jumping was officially added as a medal sport after being included in previous Winter Asiad programs only as a demonstration sport.

== Schedule ==
F	Final

Event↓/Date →	31st Mon	1st Tue	2nd Wed	3rd Thu	4th Fri
Men's normal hill individual					F
Men's large hill individual	F				
Men's large hill team			F		

== Medalists ==
Event	Gold	Silver	Bronze
Normal hill individual	Yevgeniy Levkin; Kazakhstan	Kazuya Yoshioka; Japan	Radik Zhaparov; Kazakhstan
Large hill individual	Kazuya Yoshioka; Japan	Kazuyoshi Funaki; Japan	Nikolay Karpenko; Kazakhstan
Large hill team	Japan; Kazuyoshi Funaki; Yuhei Sasaki; Yuta Watase; Kazuya Yoshioka	Kazakhstan; Alexey Korolev; Radik Zhaparov; Yevgeniy Levkin; Nikolay Karpenko	South Korea; Choi Heung-chul; Kang Chil-ku; Choi Yong-jik; Kim Hyun-ki

== Medal table ==
Rank	Nation	Gold	Silver	Bronze	Total
1	Japan (JPN)	2	2	0	4
2	Kazakhstan (KAZ)	1	1	2	4
3	South Korea (KOR)	0	0	1	1
Totals (3 entries)		3	3	3	9

== Participating nations ==
A total of 19 athletes from 4 nations competed in ski jumping at the 2011 Asian Winter Games:

- China (5)
- Japan (4)
- Kazakhstan (6)
- South Korea (4)
