= Ski jumping at the Asian Winter Games =

- Governing bodies: FIS (World) / ASF (Asia)
- Events: 3 (men)

Games
- 1986; 1990; 1996; 1999; 2003; 2007; 2011; 2017; 2025; Demonstration sport years indicated in italics
- Medalists

Ski jumping has been featured as a sport in the Asian Winter Games since the fifth winter games in 2003. From 1986 to 1996, ski jumping was featured as demonstration sport.

== Editions ==
Games	Year	Host city	Best nation
V	2003	Aomori, Japan	Japan
VII	2011	Astana–Almaty, Kazakhstan	Japan
VIII	2017	Sapporo, Japan	Japan

== Events ==
Event	86	90	96	03	11	17	Years
Men's normal hill individual			d	X	X	X	3
Men's Large hill individual	d	d			X	X	2
Men's normal hill team			d	X			1
Men's Large hill team					X	X	2
Total	0	0	0	2	3	3	

== Medal table ==
Rank	Nation	Gold	Silver	Bronze	Total
1	Japan (JPN)	6	6	0	12
2	Kazakhstan (KAZ)	1	2	5	8
3	South Korea (KOR)	1	0	3	4
Totals (3 entries)		8	8	8	24

== Participating nations ==
Nation	86	90	96	03	11	17	Years
China			X		5	5	3
Japan	X	X	X	5	4	4	6
Kazakhstan			X	4	6	4	4
Kyrgyzstan				1			1
South Korea				4	4	4	3
Number of nations	1	1	3	4	4	4	
Number of athletes				14	19	17	
