= Ski jumping at the 2011 Asian Winter Games – Men's large hill individual =

Men's large hill individual at the 2011 Asian Winter Games
- Venue: International Ski Jump Complex
- Dates: 31 January 2011
- Competitors: 12 from 4 nations

Medalists
gold medal	Kazuya Yoshioka	Japan
silver medal	Kazuyoshi Funaki	Japan
bronze medal	Nikolay Karpenko	Kazakhstan

The men's large hill K125 individual competition at the 2011 Asian Winter Games in Almaty, Kazakhstan was held on 31 January at the International Ski Jump Complex.

== Schedule ==
All times are Almaty Time (UTC+06:00)

Date	Time	Event
Monday, 31 January 2011	11:00	Final

== Results ==
Rank	Athlete	1st round		Final round		Total
Rank	Athlete	Distance	Score	Distance	Score	Total
1st place, gold medalist(s)	Kazuya Yoshioka (JPN)	124.0	110.2	130.5	122.9	233.1
2nd place, silver medalist(s)	Kazuyoshi Funaki (JPN)	119.5	103.6	125.0	113.5	217.1
3rd place, bronze medalist(s)	Nikolay Karpenko (KAZ)	119.0	100.7	126.0	115.8	216.5
4	Kim Hyun-ki (KOR)	119.5	102.1	123.5	110.3	212.4
5	Alexey Korolev (KAZ)	118.5	100.3	122.0	106.6	206.9
6	Yevgeniy Levkin (KAZ)	118.0	99.4	121.0	103.8	203.2
7	Choi Heung-chul (KOR)	117.5	98.5	118.0	98.9	197.4
8	Radik Zhaparov (KAZ)	114.5	89.1	121.0	103.8	192.9
9	Konstantin Sokolenko (KAZ)	115.5	93.4	118.0	98.9	192.3
10	Assan Takhtakhunov (KAZ)	108.0	78.4	111.5	84.7	163.1
11	Yang Guang (CHN)	92.5	45.5	95.0	50.5	96.0
12	Sun Jianping (CHN)	82.0	24.6	80.0	21.5	46.1
