= Ski jumping at the 2011 Asian Winter Games – Men's normal hill individual =

Men's normal hill individual at the 2011 Asian Winter Games
- Venue: International Ski Jump Complex
- Dates: 4 February 2011
- Competitors: 12 from 4 nations

Medalists
gold medal	Yevgeniy Levkin	Kazakhstan
silver medal	Kazuya Yoshioka	Japan
bronze medal	Radik Zhaparov	Kazakhstan

The men's normal hill K95 individual competition at the 2011 Asian Winter Games in Almaty, Kazakhstan was held on 4 February at the International Ski Jump Complex.

== Schedule ==
All times are Almaty Time (UTC+06:00)

Date	Time	Event
Friday, 4 February 2011	10:15	Final

== Results ==
Rank	Athlete	1st round		Final round		Total
Rank	Athlete	Distance	Score	Distance	Score	Total
1st place, gold medalist(s)	Yevgeniy Levkin (KAZ)	102.0	128.5	99.0	123.5	252.0
2nd place, silver medalist(s)	Kazuya Yoshioka (JPN)	102.0	125.5	100.5	123.0	248.5
3rd place, bronze medalist(s)	Radik Zhaparov (KAZ)	101.0	125.0	97.5	119.0	244.0
4	Nikolay Karpenko (KAZ)	98.5	120.5	97.0	117.0	237.5
5	Choi Yong-jik (KOR)	97.5	117.5	97.5	117.5	235.0
6	Kazuyoshi Funaki (JPN)	98.0	118.0	97.5	116.5	234.5
7	Choi Heung-chul (KOR)	97.5	117.5	96.5	115.0	232.5
8	Alexey Korolev (KAZ)	97.0	116.0	95.5	113.5	229.5
9	Konstantin Sokolenko (KAZ)	91.5	104.0	91.5	104.0	208.0
10	Assan Takhtakhunov (KAZ)	93.5	107.5	89.5	99.0	206.5
11	Tian Zhandong (CHN)	87.5	95.0	86.0	91.5	186.5
12	Li Yang (CHN)	82.0	83.0	84.5	88.0	171.0
