= FIS Ski Flying World Championships 2010 =

2010 edition of the FIS Ski-Flying World Championships

- Official logo for the FIS Ski Flying World Championships 2010.
- Host city: Planica, Slovenia
- Nations: 18
- Athletes: 60
- Events: 2
- Opening: 18 March
- Closing: 21 March
- Main venue: Letalnica
- Website: Planica.si

The FIS Ski Flying World Championships 2010 was held 18–21 March 2010 in Planica, Slovenia for a record sixth time. Planica hosted the event previously in 1972, 1979, 1985, 1994, and 2004. Austria's Gregor Schlierenzauer was the defending individual champion. Schlierenzauer and his Austrian teammates of Andreas Kofler, Martin Koch, and Thomas Morgenstern were the defending team champions.

== Schedule ==
Letalnica bratov Gorišek (K-185; HS215)
Day	Date	Event	Longest jump of the day (m)
Wednesday	Mar 17	Hill Test Jumps	219.0 - Rok Mandl
Thursday	Mar 18	Qualification	230.5 - Bjørn Einar Romøren
Friday	Mar 19	Individual, Day 1	223.5 - Robert Kranjec
Saturday	Mar 20	Individual, Day 2	236.5 - Simon Ammann
Sunday	Mar 21	Team event	231.0 - Gregor Schlierenzauer

== Results ==
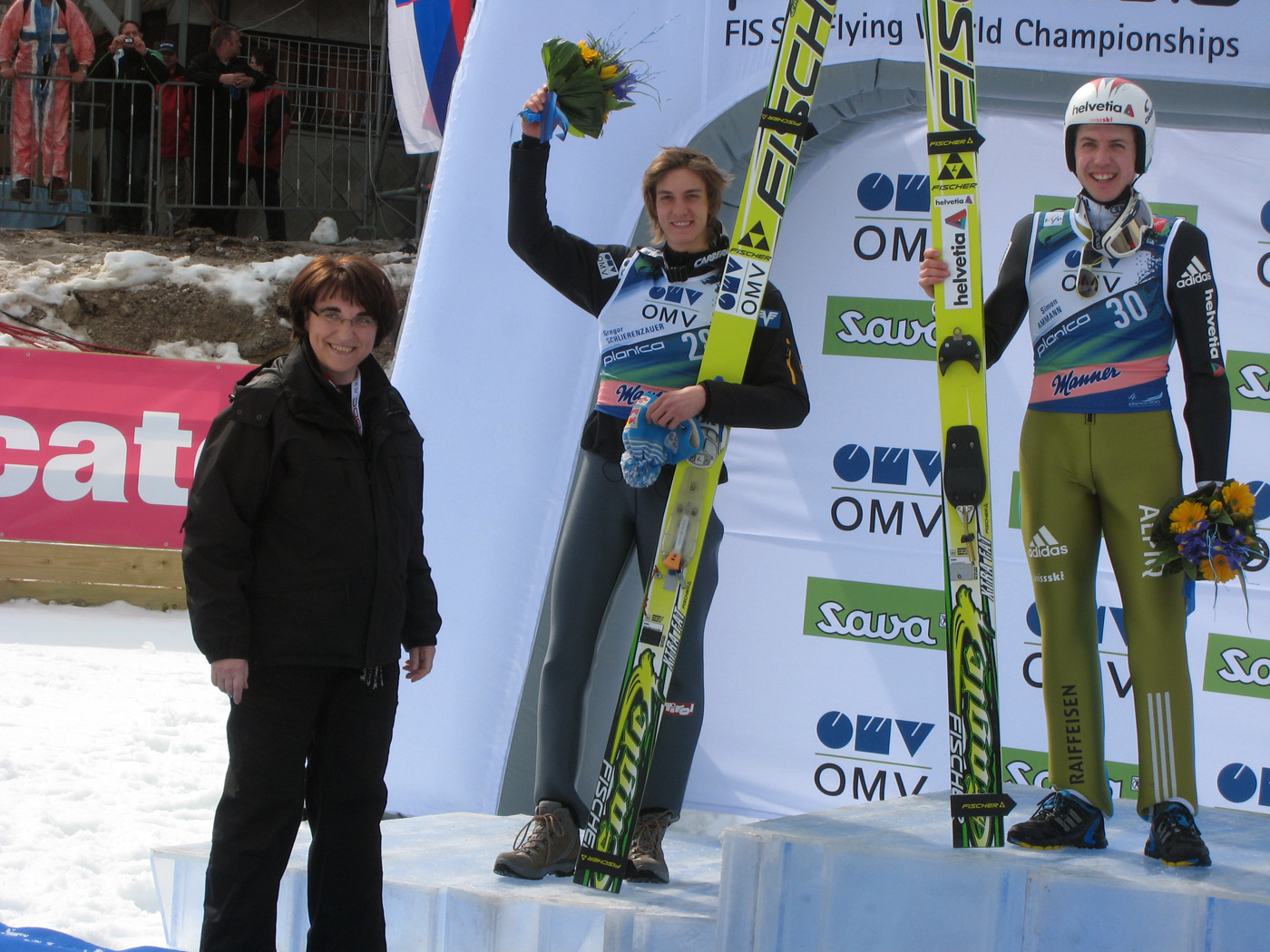
Winner Simon Ammann and second Gregor Schlierenzauer on the podium, bouquets presented by Slovenian Defence Minister Ljubica Jelušič

MORS video of the event

=== Qualifying ===
18 March 2010

Rank	Bib	Name	Distance (meters)			Points	Note
Rank	Bib	Name	1st Training	2nd Training	Qualifying	Points	Note
1	54	(Japan) Noriaki Kasai	215.5	204.0	210.5	207.6	Q
2	51	(Czech Republic) Antonin Hajek	213.0	228.5	207.5	206.1	Q
3	50	(Poland) Kamil Stoch	190.0	202.5	201.5	199.9	Q
4	48	(Finland) Matti Hautamäki	205.5	192.5	204.0	199.1	Q
5	52	(Germany) Michael Neumayer	201.5	201.5	203.0	198.8	Q
6	55	(Japan) Daiki Ito	187.0	195.0	200.5	197.4	Q
7	53	(Norway) Johan Remen Evensen	201.5	189.0	200.0	196.5	Q
8	56	(France) Emmanuel Chedal	200.0	196.5	197.5	193.1	Q
9	34	(Finland) Janne Happonen	197.5	203.5	207.5	187.9	Q
10	32	(Czech Republic) Borek Sedlak	183.5	195.0	202.5	182.8	Q
11	58	(Austria) David Zauner	191.0	202.5	183.0	181.2	Q
12	36	(France) Vincent Descombes Sevoie	182.5	200.0	198.5	178.7	Q
13	59	(Germany) Michael Uhrmann	185.0	198.5	183.5	174.0	Q
14	37	(Italy) Andrea Morassi	187.5	196.0	195.5	173.9	Q
15	29	(Slovenia) Primož Pikl	192.5	191.5	190.5	173.1	Q
16	40	(Poland) Łukasz Rutkowski	190.0	188.5	196.5	172.9	Q
17	47	(Germany) Martin Schmitt	196.5	185.5	180.0	170.6	Q
18	49	(Norway) Tom Hilde	191.5	201.0	182.0	170.2	Q
19	35	(Czech Republic) Lukas Hlava	183.5	196.0	194.0	169.9	Q
20	57	(Finland) Harri Olli	201.5	193.0	176.0	169.2	Q
21	25	(Slovenia) Robert Hrgota	193.0	196.5	185.5	167.6	Q
22	45	(Slovenia) Jernej Damjan	172.5	191.5	181.5	164.8	Q
23	41	(Italy) Sebastian Colloredo	192.5	196.5	185.5	162.4	Q
24	31	(Czech Republic) Jan Matura	179.0	183.0	180.5	157.3	Q
25	11	(Poland) Rafał Śliż	199.0	188.0	176.0	156.4	Q
26	33	(Japan) Taku Takeuchi	170.5	172.5	178.5	150.2	Q
27	16	(Russia) Roman Sergeevich Trofimov	186.0	184.0	170.5	147.8	Q
28	19	(Germany) Richard Freitag	175.5	185.0	170.5	147.3	Q
29	7	(United States) Nicholas Alexander	165.0	175.5	170.0	145.3	Q
30	17	(Kazakhstan) Ivan Karaulov	166.0	171.5	166.5	145.0	Q
not qualified
31	8	(Sweden) Isak Grimholm	157.0	171.5	163.5	138.3	
32	20	(Kazakhstan) Alexey Korolev	174.0	158.5	157.5	134.3	
33	13	(Russia) Stanislav Oshepkov	163.0	161.0	157.0	132.1	
34	21	(Italy) Roberto Dellasega	183.5	170.0	158.0	129.4	
35	6	(Slovakia) Tomas Zmoray	164.0	154.0	154.0	129.3	
36	14	(Italy) Diego Dellasega	174.5	160.0	155.0	129.1	
37	23	(Kazakhstan) Nikolay Karpenko	139.0	151.0	152.5	125.9	
38	5	(United States) Chris Lamb	158.0	169.5	154.5	124.9	
39	24	(Russia) Ilja Rosliakov	170.5	170.0	152.0	124.7	
40	22	(South Korea) Hyun-Ki Kim	173.5	168.0	155.0	123.9	
41	12	(United States) Nicholas Fairall	179.0	157.0	150.0	123.4	
42	15	(South Korea) Heung-Chul Choi	156.5	133.0	152.0	123.1	
43	2	(Russia) Georgiy Chervyakov	150.5	156.0	151.0	121.4	
44	18	(United States) Michael Glasder	169.0	158.0	143.0	108.6	
45	3	(Sweden) Fredrik Balkåsen	180.0	161.0	134.0	96.9	
46	10	(Bulgaria) Bogomil Pavlov	122.0	122.0	123.0	85.2	
prequalified
*	60	(Finland) Janne Ahonen	185.5	188.0	179.0		q
*	61	(Slovenia) Robert Kranjec	199.0	215.0	216.5		q
*	62	(Norway) Bjørn Einar Romøren	202.5	203.0	230.5		q
*	63	(Austria) Martin Koch	203.0	208.0	207.0		q
*	64	(Norway) Anders Jacobsen	205.5	208.5	198.5		q
*	65	(Austria) Wolfgang Loitzl	204.0	209.5	202.0		q
*	66	(Poland) Adam Malysz	212.0	209.5	216.5		q
*	68	(Austria) Thomas Morgenstern	198.5	203.5	182.0		q
*	69	(Austria) Gregor Schlierenzauer	210.0	211.5	206.0		q
*	70	(Switzerland) Simon Ammann	210.0	217.5	225.5		q
internal team qualifications: did not enter in qualifying round
	1	(Germany) Christian Ulmer	185.0	177.5	DNS		
	9	(Czech Republic) Čestmír Kožíšek	184.5	183.0	DNS		
	26	(Slovenia) Jurij Tepeš	192.0	183.0	DNS		
	27	(Poland) Stefan Hula	195.5	183.5	DNS		
	28	(Poland) Marcin Bachleda	201.5	183.5	DNS		
	30	(Finland) Olli Muotka	204.5	196.5	DNS		
	38	(Slovenia) Mitja Mežnar	171.0	186.5	DNS		
	39	(Germany) Severin Freund	160.0	181.5	DNS		
	42	(Norway) Anders Bardal	189.5	191.5	DNS		
	43	(Finland) Kalle Keituri	185.5	193.5	DNS		
	44	(Japan) Shohei Tochimoto	90.0	DNS	DNS		
	46	(Norway) Roar Ljøkelsøy	183.0	196.0	DNS		
	67	(Austria) Andreas Kofler	173.0	181.0	DNS		
did not start at all
	4	(Bulgaria) Vladimir Zografski	DNS	DNS	DNS		

=== Individual ===
Men's Ski Flying individual at the FIS Ski Flying World Championships 2010
- Venue: Letalnica bratov Gorišek
- Date: 19–20 March 2010
- Competitors: 40 from 14 nations
- Winning score: 935.8

Medalists
gold medal	Simon Ammann	Switzerland
silver medal	Gregor Schlierenzauer	Austria
bronze medal	Anders Jacobsen	Norway

Ammann had the longest jump of the competition with a 236.5 m fourth round jump. He also led after the first two rounds and had the most points both two days to win the championships for the first time. Adam Małysz was second after three jumps, but had a poor fourth round jump to fall to fourth. The defending champion Schlierenzauer finished second. The second longest jump had Antonín Hájek with a 236.0 m and local matador Robert Kranjec, the winner of the ski flying World Cup 2009/10, finished fifth. After the first round, former ski flying champion Roar Ljøkelsøy jumped for the final time in his career after he failed to qualify for the first round.

19–20 March 2010.

Rank	Bib	Name	Distance (meters)						Total Points
Rank	Bib	Name	Day One (March 19)			Day Two (March 20)			Total Points
Rank	Bib	Name	Trial Round	1st Round	2nd Round	Trial Round	3rd Round	Final Round	Total Points
1st place, gold medalist(s)	30	(Switzerland) Simon Ammann	176.0	215.5	216.5	216.5	227.0	236.5	935.8
2nd place, silver medalist(s)	28	(Austria) Gregor Schlierenzauer	187.5	209.5	205.0	203.0	222.5	230.5	910.3
3rd place, bronze medalist(s)	23	(Norway) Anders Jacobsen	200.5	217.0	194.5	188.5	230.5	227.5	894.0
4	29	(Poland) Adam Malysz	199.5	217.5	215.0	213.5	211.0	211.5	893.6
5	25	(Slovenia) Robert Kranjec	182.0	223.5	203.5	190.5	212.5	222.5	873.5
6	27	(Austria) Wolfgang Loitzl	202.0	207.0	211.5	205.5	213.5	200.0	865.3
7	20	(Austria) Thomas Morgenstern	157.0	196.5	211.5	208.5	225.5	215.5	855.4
8	19	(Czech Republic) Antonin Hajek	179.0	203.0	210.5	211.0	223.5	236.0	844.9
9	24	(Norway) Bjørn Einar Romøren	193.5	214.5	196.5	194.0	205.0	223.0	844.5
10	22	(Austria) Martin Koch	190.0	208.5	206.0	199.5	220.0	200.0	839.8
11	26	(Finland) Harri Olli	DNS	215.5	200.0	203.5	195.5	199.0	819.9
12	18	(Japan) Noriaki Kasai	213.5	215.5	209.5	205.0	220.5	224.0	817.1
13	21	(Austria) David Zauner	189.5	193.5	223.0	185.0	202.0	202.5	806.2
14	16	(France) Emmanuel Chedal	190.0	210.0	211.5	205.0	199.0	214.0	780.9
15	17	(Finland) Janne Happonen	187.0	202.0	201.0	196.5	205.5	211.5	777.3
16	14	(Poland) Kamil Stoch	191.5	186.5	207.5	203.5	203.5	218.0	770.0
17	15	(Finland) Matti Hautamäki	161.5	193.5	204.0	191.5	204.0	204.5	762.6
18	12	(Norway) Johan Remen Evensen	211.5	199.5	195.0	191.0	219.5	202.0	756.9
19	9	(Germany) Michael Uhrmann	181.5	185.5	201.0	179.0	211.5	203.5	745.7
20	11	(Japan) Daiki Ito	179.5	200.5	191.5	171.5	209.5	197.5	743.5
21	13	(Germany) Martin Schmitt	189.0	194.0	200.0	191.5	186.5	193.5	721.8
22	4	(Germany) Michael Neumayer	197.0	184.5	189.5	183.5	198.5	205.5	714.0
23	1	(Italy) Andrea Morassi	194.0	163.0	188.0	199.5	201.5	198.5	711.4
24	7	(Italy) Sebastian Colloredo	176.5	189.0	194.5	183.0	193.0	194.5	710.0
25	10	(Slovenia) Jernej Damjan	174.0	200.0	194.5	175.0	195.5	184.0	708.5
26	5	(Czech Republic) Borek Sedlak	165.5	169.5	198.0	179.0	192.5	201.0	704.6
27	3	(Finland) Janne Ahonen	165.5	182.0	189.5	183.0	197.0	197.0	701.1
28	8	(Germany) Richard Freitag	DNS	181.5	198.5	173.0	170.0	193.5	685.7
29	6	(Norway) Tom Hilde	181.0	186.5	185.5	164.5	185.0	187.5	680.6
30	2	(Slovenia) Robert Hrgota	184.0	180.5	178.5	195.5	190.5	178.5	674.6
31		(Czech Republic) Lukas Hlava	179.0	170.5	179.5		DNQ		331.4
32		(Poland) Rafał Śliż	197.5	172.0	DNQ				155.9
33		(Poland) Łukasz Rutkowski	185.5	175.5	DNQ				150.4
34		(Japan) Taku Takeuchi	152.0	168.5	DNQ				149.1
35		(Czech Republic) Jan Matura	156.0	161.5	DNQ				146.1
36		(Kazakhstan) Ivan Karaulov	159.0	160.5	DNQ				144.0
37		(France) Vincent Descombes Sevoie	187.5	159.0	DNQ				143.8
38		(Russia) Roman Sergeevich Trofimov	184.5	162.0	DNQ				143.2
39		(Slovenia) Primož Pikl	158.0	160.0	DNQ				139.8
		(United States) Nicholas Alexander	184.5	DNS					

=== Team Event ===
Men's Ski Flying Team event at the FIS Ski Flying World Championships 2010
- Venue: Letalnica bratov Gorišek
- Date: 21 March 2010
- Competitors: 40 from 10 nations
- Winning score: 1641.4

Medalists
gold medal	Austria
silver medal	Norway
bronze medal	Finland

21 March 2010.

Rank	Team	Distance (meters)			Points
Rank	Team	Trial Round	1st Round	Final Round	Points
1st place, gold medalist(s)	Austria; 10-1 Wolfgang Loitzl; 10-2 Thomas Morgenstern; 10-3 Martin Koch; 10-4 Gregor Schlierenzauer	205.5; 220.0; 219.0; 218.0	183.5; 215.5; 184.5; 226.5	206.0; 198.0; 217.5; 231.0	1641.4
2nd place, silver medalist(s)	Norway; 9-1 Anders Jacobsen; 9-2 Anders Bardal; 9-3 Johan Remen Evensen; 9-4 Bjørn Einar Romøren	202.5; 193.0; 201.5; 185.5	202.0; 179.5; 197.5; 214.5	217.5; 189.5; 193.5; 201.5	1542.3
3rd place, bronze medalist(s)	Finland; 7-1 Janne Happonen; 7-2 Olli Muotka; 7-3 Matti Hautamäki; 7-4 Harri Olli	167.5; 184.5; 214.5; DNS	202.5; 191.0; 195.5; 215.0	213.5; 166.5; 194.5; 190.5	1474.3
4	Poland; 6-1 Kamil Stoch; 6-2 Łukasz Rutkowski; 6-3 Stefan Hula; 6-4 Adam Malysz	184.5; 183.0; 184.5; 207.5	197.5; 188.5; 192.5; 218.5	222.5; 143.0; 179.0; 213.5	1452.5
5	Czech Republic; 4-1 Lukas Hlava; 4-2 Jan Matura; 4-3 Borek Sedlak; 4-4 Antonin Hajek	183.5; 175.5; 176.0; 198.5	181.5; 180.5; 187.5; 191.5	203.5; 186.5; 180.5; 205.5	1399.2
6	Slovenia; 5-1 Robert Hrgota; 5-2 Jernej Damjan; 5-3 Jurij Tepeš; 5-4 Robert Kranjec	178.0; 191.0; 177.5; 200.5	177.5; 177.0; 181.5; 219.5	189.5; 178.0; 170.5; 206.5	1378.3
7	Germany; 8-1 Michael Neumayer; 8-2 Richard Freitag; 8-3 Martin Schmitt; 8-4 Michael Uhrmann	183.5; 182.5; 182.0; 183.5	194.0; 164.5; 178.5; 196.0	193.5; 156.5; 182.5; 193.5	1322.9
8	Italy; 2-1 Sebastian Colloredo; 2-2 Andrea Morassi; 2-3 Roberto Dellasega; 2-4 Diego Dellasega	190.5; 204.5; 192.5; 152.0	173.5; 198.5; 158.0; 131.0	189.0; 203.0; 160.5; 162.5	1219.6
9	Russia; 3-1 Georgiy Chervyakov; 3-2 Stanislav Oshepkov; 3-3 Ilya Rosliakov; 3-4 Roman Sergeevich Trofimov	152.0; 163.5; 161.5; 183.5	134.0; 156.0; 172.5; 176.5	DNQ; DNQ; DNQ; DNQ	545.0
10	United States; 1-1 Nicholas Fairall; 1-2 Michael Glasder; 1-3 Chris Lamb; 1-4 Nicholas Alexander	132.0; 152.0; 149.0; 183.0	121.5; 154.0; 151.5; 163.5	DNQ; DNQ; DNQ; DNQ	462.2

Schlierenzauer had the longest jump of the competition with his 231.0 m final round jump.

== Medal table ==
Rank	Nation	Gold	Silver	Bronze	Total
1	Austria (AUT)	1	1	0	2
2	Switzerland (SUI)	1	0	0	1
3	Norway (NOR)	0	1	1	2
4	Finland (FIN)	0	0	1	1
Totals (4 entries)		2	2	2	6
