= Ski jumping at the 2017 Asian Winter Games – Men's large hill team =

Men's large hill team at the 2017 Asian Winter Games
- Venue: Okurayama Ski Jump Stadium
- Dates: 25 February 2017
- Competitors: 16 from 4 nations

Medalists
gold medal	Japan; Yuken Iwasa, Yukiya Sato, Naoki Nakamura, Masamitsu Ito
silver medal	Kazakhstan; Sabirzhan Muminov, Konstantin Sokolenko, Marat Zhaparov, Sergey Tkachenko
bronze medal	South Korea; Lee Ju-chan, Choi Heung-chul, Kim Hyun-ki, Choi Seo-u

The men's large hill HS137 individual competition at the 2017 Asian Winter Games in Sapporo, Japan was held on 25 February at the Okurayama Ski Jump Stadium.

== Schedule ==
All times are Japan Standard Time (UTC+09:00)

Date	Time	Event
Saturday, 25 February 2017	17:30	Final

== Results ==
Rank	Team	1st round		Final round		Total
Rank	Team	Distance	Score	Distance	Score	Total
1st place, gold medalist(s)	Japan (JPN)		473.4		502.2	975.6
	Yuken Iwasa	127.5	120.6	131.0	127.4	
	Yukiya Sato	126.5	118.8	128.5	123.9	
	Naoki Nakamura	132.0	130.2	133.0	133.5	
	Masamitsu Ito	119.0	103.8	126.0	117.4	
2nd place, silver medalist(s)	Kazakhstan (KAZ)		382.7		388.3	771.0
	Sabirzhan Muminov	118.5	100.9	116.5	94.3	
	Konstantin Sokolenko	109.5	83.7	108.5	81.9	
	Marat Zhaparov	127.0	96.7	122.0	107.7	
	Sergey Tkachenko	118.5	101.4	121.0	104.4	
3rd place, bronze medalist(s)	South Korea (KOR)		362.6		363.7	726.3
	Lee Ju-chan	96.0	54.6	93.5	52.4	
	Choi Heung-chul	109.0	83.3	117.5	101.1	
	Kim Hyun-ki	123.0	109.5	123.0	110.0	
	Choi Seo-u	123.5	113.4	117.0	100.2	
4	China (CHN)		223.8		198.2	422.0
	Sun Jianping	88.5	40.9	84.5	35.2	
	Li Chao	88.5	40.4	84.5	31.7	
	Yang Guang	97.5	60.1	95.0	54.6	
	Tian Zhandong	108.5	82.4	107.0	76.7	
