= Ottoman Bulgaria =

Bulgarian territory controlled by the Ottoman Empire, 14th-19th centuries

Ottoman Bulgaria Българските земи под османско владичество (Bulgarian) Bŭlgarskite zemi pod osmansko vladichestvo
- 1396–1908
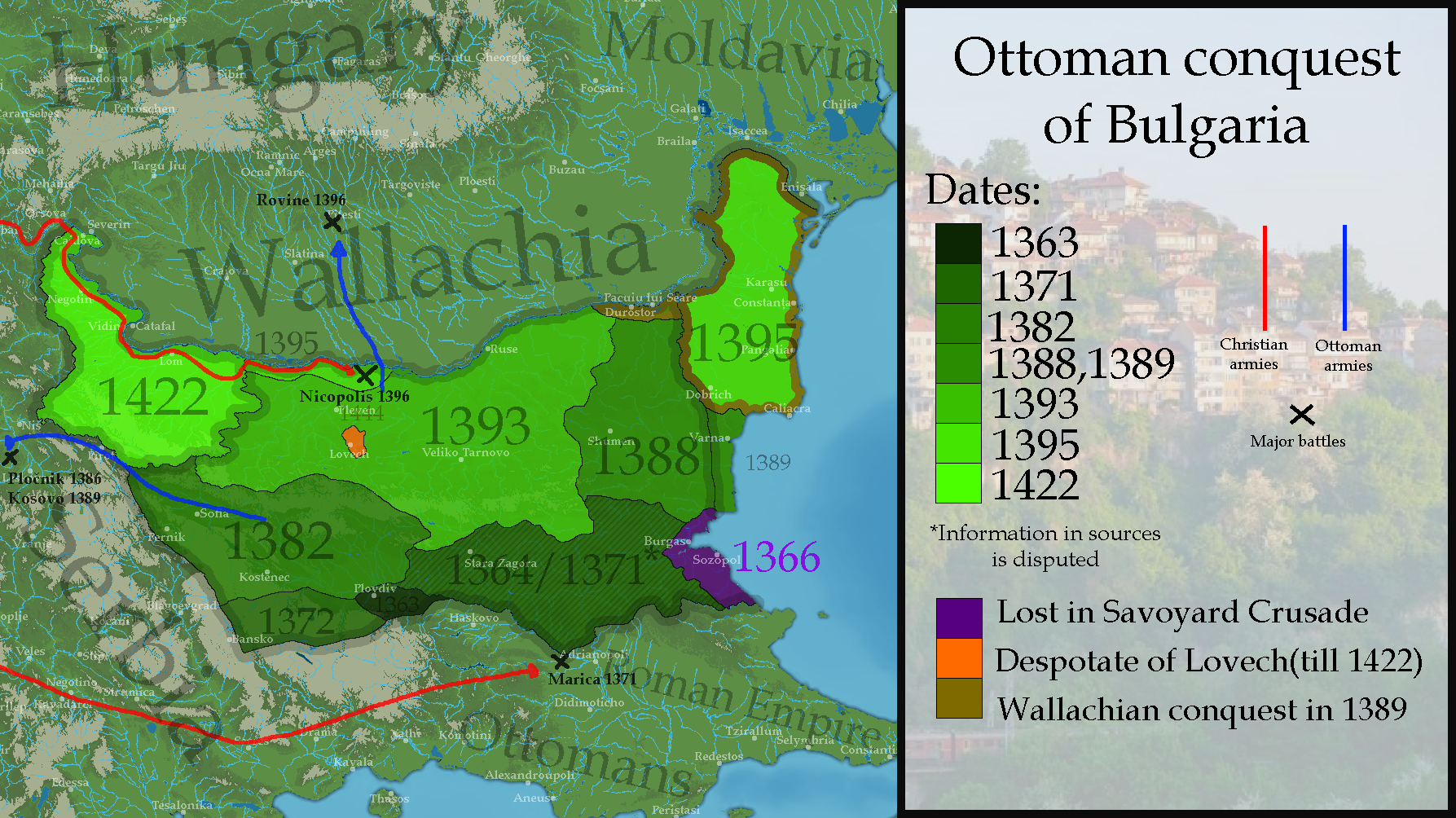
- Common languages: Bulgarian
- Religion: Sunni Islam (state); Bulgarian Orthodox Church (majority)
- Demonym: Bulgarian
- Government: Vilayets of the Ottoman Empire
- Beylerbey, Pasha, Agha, Dey
- History
  - Battle of Nicopolis: 1396
  - Treaty of Berlin (1878): 1908
- Today part of: Bulgaria

The history of Ottoman Bulgaria spans over 500 years, beginning in the late 14th century, with the Ottoman conquest of smaller kingdoms from the disintegrating Second Bulgarian Empire. After the Russo-Turkish War of 1878, Bulgaria was gradually liberated from the Ottoman Empire, and, in 1908, Bulgaria declared its independence from the Ottoman Empire.

The brutal suppression of the Bulgarian April Uprising of 1876 and the public outcry it caused across Europe led to the Constantinople Conference, where the Great Powers tabled a joint proposal for the creation of two autonomous Bulgarian vilayets, largely corresponding to the ethnic boundaries drawn a decade earlier with the establishment of the Bulgarian Exarchate.

The sabotage of the Conference, by the British, led to the Russo-Turkish War (1877–1878), whereby the much smaller Principality of Bulgaria, a self-governing, but functionally independent Ottoman vassal state was created. In 1885 the Ottoman autonomous province of Eastern Rumelia unified through a bloodless coup with the Principality of Bulgaria.

== Administrative organization ==
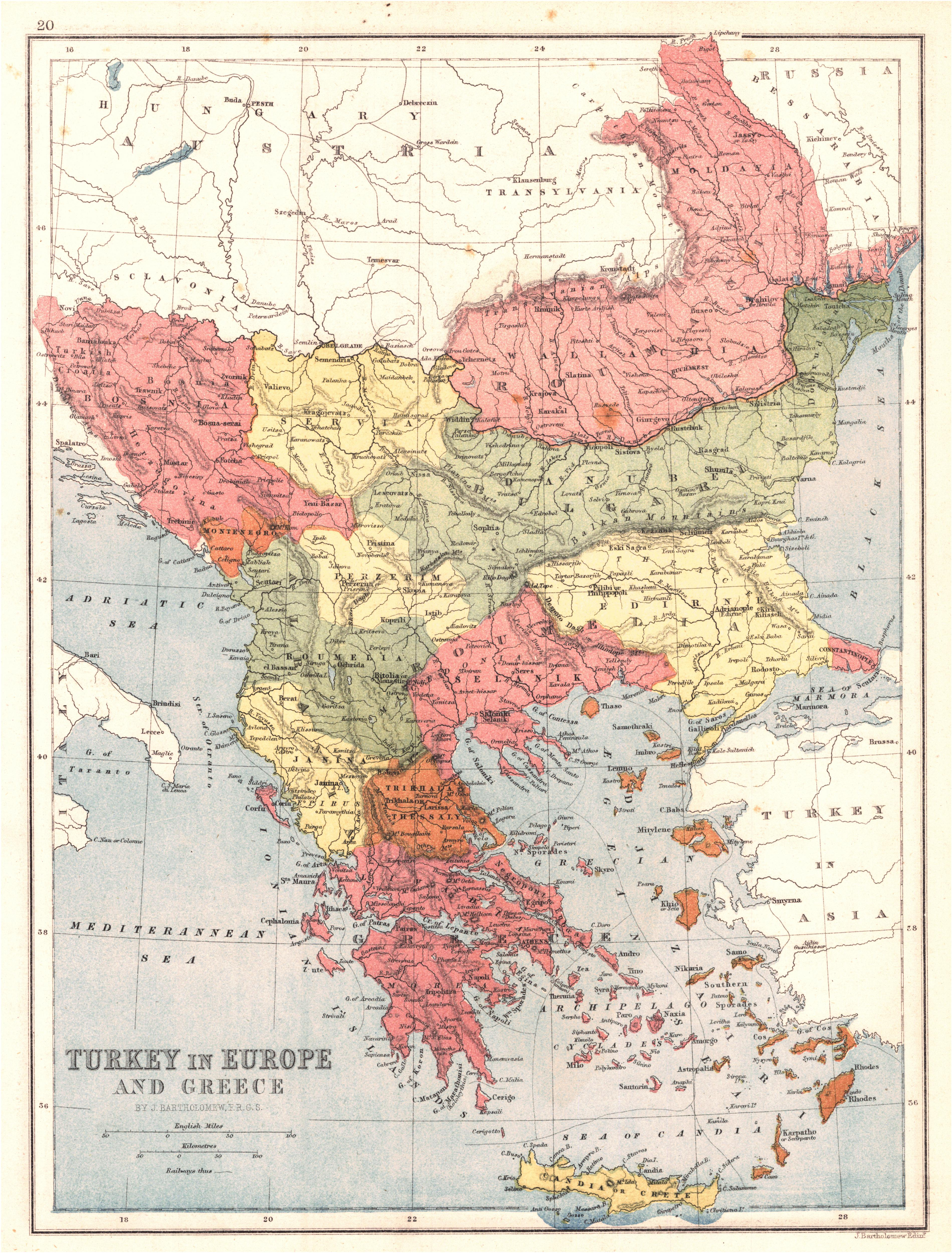
Map of Ottoman vilayets in Europe in the 1870s. The Danube vilayet is coloured in green

The Ottomans reorganised the Bulgarian territories, dividing them into several vilayets, each ruled by a Sanjakbey or Subasi accountable to the Beylerbey. Significant parts of the conquered land were parcelled out to the Sultan's followers, who held it as benefices or fiefs (small timar, medium zeamet and large hass) directly from him, or from the Beylerbeys. This category of land could not be sold or inherited but reverted to the Sultan when the fiefholder died. The lands were organised as private possessions of the Sultan or Ottoman nobility, called "mülk", and also as an economic base for religious foundations, called vakιf, as well as other people. The system was meant to make the army self-sufficient and to continuously increase the number of Ottoman cavalry soldiers, thus both fuelling new conquests and bringing conquered countries under direct Ottoman control.

From the 14th century until the 19th century Sofia was an important administrative centre in the Ottoman Empire. It became the capital of the beylerbeylik of Rumelia (Rumelia Eyalet), the province that administered the Ottoman lands in Europe (the Balkans), one of the two together with the beylerbeylik of Anatolia. It was the capital of the important Sanjak of Sofia as well, including the whole of Thrace with Plovdiv and Edirne, and part of Macedonia with Thessaloniki and Skopje.

The Danube Vilayet was a first-level administrative division (vilayet) of the Ottoman Empire from 1864 to 1878 with a capital in Ruse. In the late 19th century it reportedly had an area of 34,120 square miles (88,400 km^{2}) and incorporated the Vidin Eyalet, Silistra Eyalet and Niš Eyalet.

== Legal status and taxation ==
Christians paid disproportionately higher taxes than Muslims, including poll tax, jizye, in lieu of military service. According to İnalcık, jizye was the single most important source of income (48 per cent) to the Ottoman budget, with Rumelia accounting for the lion's share, or 81 per cent of the revenues. By the early 1600s, the timar system had virtually been abolished, and almost all land had been divided into estates (arpalik) granted to senior Ottoman dignitaries as a form of tax farming, which created conditions for severe exploitation of taxpayers by unscrupulous land holders.

According to Radishev, overtaxation became a particularly poignant issue after jizye collection in most of the country was taken over by the Six Divisions of Cavalry.

Bulgarians also paid a number of other taxes, including a tithe ("yushur"), a land tax ("ispench"), a levy on commerce, and various irregularly collected taxes, products and corvees ("avariz"). Generally, the overall tax burden on the rayah (i.e., non-Muslims), was twice as high as that on Muslims.

Christians faced a number of other restrictions: they were barred from testifying against Muslims in inter-faith legal disputes. Even though they were free to perform their own religious rituals, this had to be done in a manner that was inconspicuous to Muslims, i.e., loud prayers or bell ringing were forbidden. They were barred from certain professions, from riding horses, from wearing certain colours or from carrying weapons.

Nevertheless, there were specific categories of rayah who were exempt from nearly all such restrictions, such as the Dervendjis, who guarded important passes, roads, bridges, etc., ore-mining settlements such as Chiprovtsi, etc. Some of the most important Bulgarian cultural and economic centres in the 19th century owe their development to a former dervendji status, for example, Gabrovo, Dryanovo, Kalofer, Panagyurishte, Kotel, Zheravna. Similarly, Christians living on wakf holdings were subject to lower tax burden and fewer restrictions.

== Religion ==
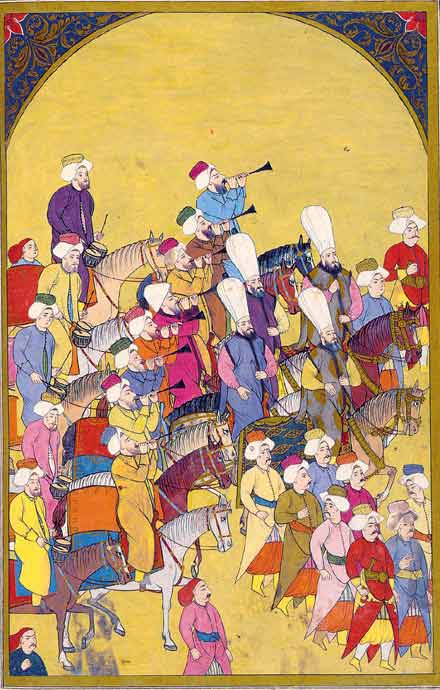
Christian-born Devşirme, would later serve in the elite Janissary. In this miniature Janissaries march to the tunes played by the Mehter.

The Ottoman Empire's greatest advantage compared to other colonial powers, the millet system and the autonomy each denomination had within legal, confessional, cultural and family matters, nevertheless, largely did not apply to Bulgarians and most other Orthodox peoples on the Balkans, as the independent Bulgarian Patriarchate was destroyed and all Bulgarian Orthodox dioceses were subjected to the rule of the Ecumenical Patriarch in Constantinople and made part of Rum millet (Greek Orthodox millet). Thus, instead of helping Christian Bulgarians maintain their customs and cultural identity, the millet system actually promoted their assimilation.

Bulgarian ceased to be a literary language, the higher clergy was invariably Greek, and the Phanariotes started making persistent efforts to hellenise Bulgarians as early as the early 1700s. It was only after the struggle for church autonomy in the mid-1800s and especially after the Bulgarian Exarchate was established by a firman of Sultan Abdülaziz in 1870 that this policy was reversed.

Non-Muslims did not serve in the Sultan's army. The exception to this were some groups of the population with specific statute, usually used for auxiliary or rear services, and the infamous blood tax (кръвен данък), also known as devşirme, where young Christian Bulgarian boys were taken from their families, enslaved and converted to Islam and later employed either in the Janissary military corps or the Ottoman administrative system. The boys were picked from one in forty households. They had to be unmarried and, once taken, were ordered to cut all ties with their family.

While a minority of authors have argued that "some parents were often eager to have their children enrol in the Janissary service that ensured them a successful career and comfort", scholarly consensus leans very much the other way. Christian parents are described to have resented the forced recruitment of their children, and would beg and seek to buy their children out of the levy. Many different ways of avoiding the devshirme are mentioned, including: marrying the boys at the age of 12, mutilating them or having both father and son convert to Islam. In 1565, the practice led to a revolt in Albania and Epirus, where the inhabitants killed the recruiting officials.

It was not rare for the boys to attempt to preserve their faith and some recollection of their homeland and their families. For example, Stephan Gerlach writes:

They gather together and one tells another of his native land and of what he heard in church or learned in school there, and they agree among themselves that Muhammad is no prophet and that the Turkish religion is false. If there is one among them who has some little book or can teach them in some other manner something of God's world, they hear him as diligently as if he were their preacher.

When Greek scholar Janus Lascaris visited Constantinople in 1491, he met many Janissaries who not only remembered their former religion and their native land but also favoured their former coreligionists. One of them told him that he regretted having left the religion of his fathers and that he prayed at night before the cross which he kept carefully concealed.

== Spread of Islam ==
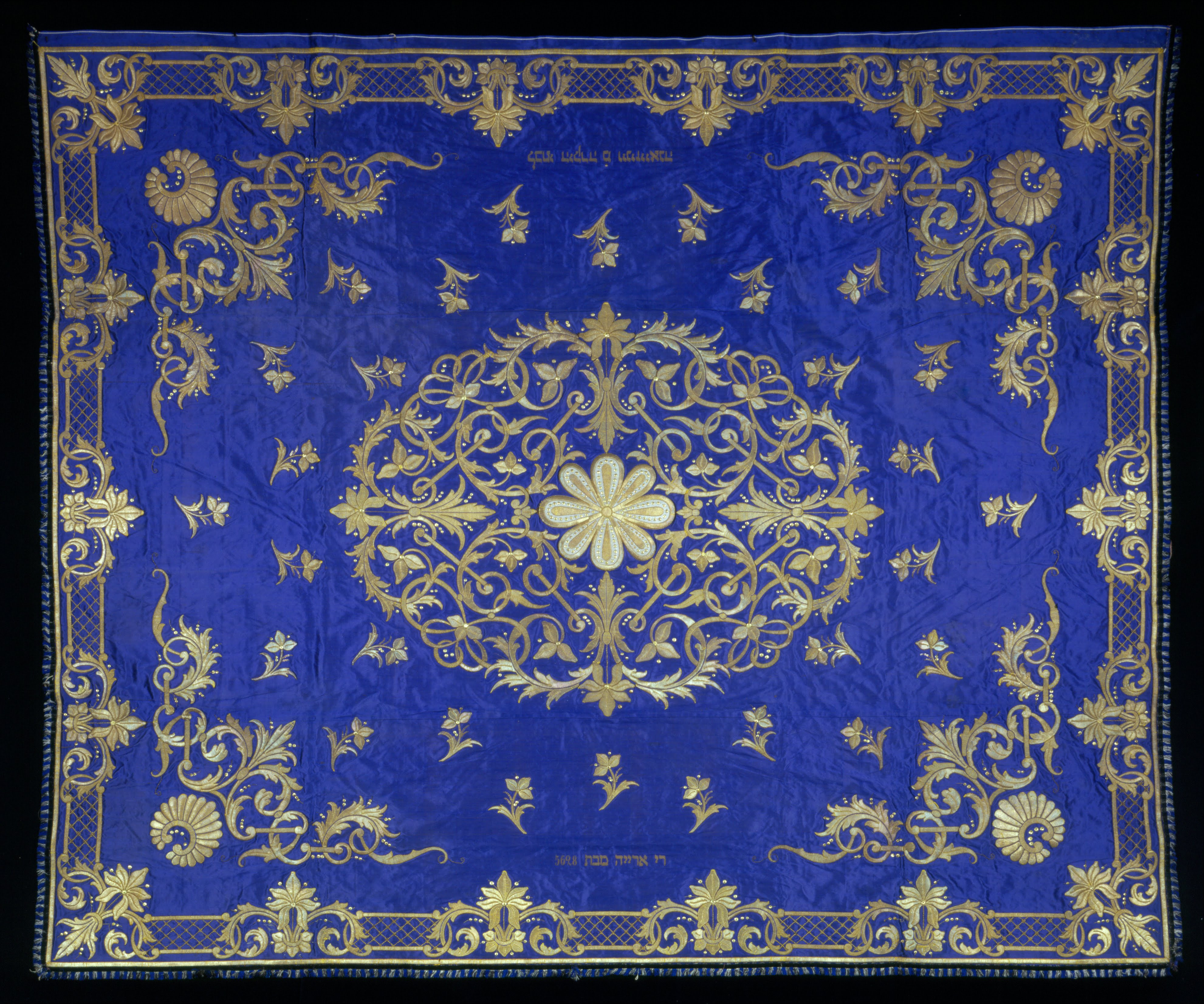
Ottoman era textile canopy from Bulgaria.

Islam in Bulgaria spread through both colonisation with Muslims from Asia Minor and conversion of native Bulgarians. The Ottomans' mass population transfers began in the late 1300s and continued well into the 1500s. The first community settled in present-day Bulgaria was made up of Tatars who willingly arrived to begin a settled life as farmers, the second one a tribe of nomads that had run afoul of the Ottoman administration. Both groups settled in the Upper Thracian Plain, in the vicinity of Plovdiv. Another large group of Tatars was moved by Mehmed I to Thrace in 1418, followed by the relocation of more than 1000 Turkoman families to Northeastern Bulgaria in the 1490s. At the same time, there are records of at least two forced relocations of Bulgarians to Anatolia, one right after the fall of Veliko Tarnovo and a second one to İzmir in the mid-1400s. The goal of this "mixing of peoples" was to quell any unrest in the conquered Balkan states, while simultaneously getting rid of troublemakers in the Ottoman backyard in Anatolia.

However, Ottomans never pursued or practiced forced Islamisation of the Bulgarian population, as had earlier been claimed by Communist Bulgarian historiography. According to scholarly consensus, conversion to Islam was voluntary as it offered Bulgarians religious and economic benefits. According to Thomas Walker Arnold, Islam was not spread by force in the areas under the control of the Ottoman Sultan. A 17th-century author said:

Meanwhile he (the Turk) wins (converts) by craft more than by force, and snatches away Christ by fraud out of the hearts of men. For the Turk, it is true, at the present time compels no country by violence to apostatise; but he uses other means whereby imperceptibly he roots out Christianity...

Thus, in a number of cases, conversion to Islam can be said to have been the result of tax coercion, due to the much lower tax burden on Muslims. While some authors have argued that other factors, such as desire to retain social status, were of greater importance, Turkish writer Halil İnalcık has referred to the desire to stop paying jizya as a primary incentive for conversion to Islam in the Balkans, and Bulgarian researcher Anton Minkov has argued that it was one among several motivating factors.

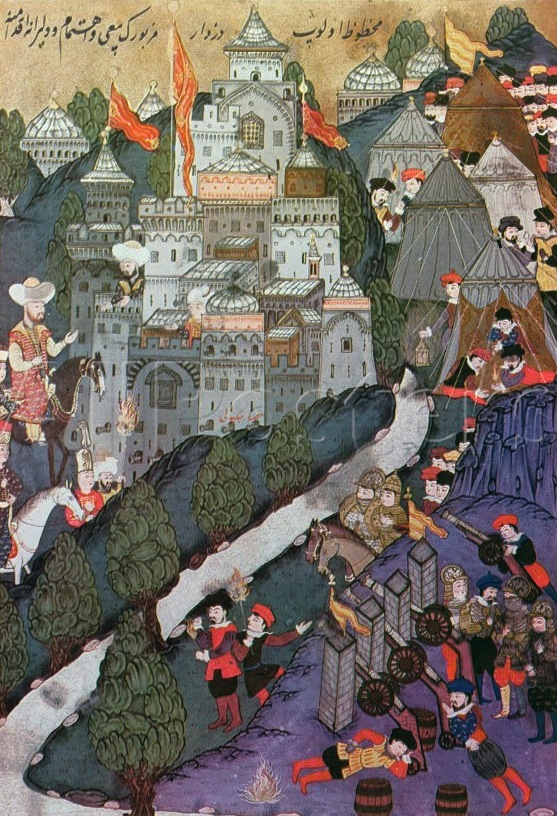
Battle of Nicopolis in the year 1396

Two large-scale studies of the causes of adoption of Islam in Bulgaria, one of the Chepino Valley by Dutch Ottomanist Machiel Kiel, and another one of the region of Gotse Delchev in the Western Rhodopes by Evgeni Radushev reveal a complex set of factors behind the process. These include: pre-existing high population density owing to the late inclusion of the two mountainous regions in the Ottoman system of taxation; immigration of Christian Bulgarians from lowland regions to avoid taxation throughout the 1400s; the relative poverty of the regions; early introduction of local Christian Bulgarians to Islam through contacts with nomadic Yörüks; the nearly constant Ottoman conflict with the Habsburgs from the mid-1500s to the early 1700s; the resulting massive war expenses that led to a sixfold increase in the jizya rate from 1574 to 1691 and the imposition of a war-time avariz tax; the Little Ice Age in the 1600s that caused crop failures and widespread famine; heavy corruption and overtaxation by local landholders—all of which led to a slow, but steady process of Islamisation until the mid-1600s when the tax burden became so unbearable that most of the remaining Christians either converted en masse or left for lowland areas.

These factors had an impact on the entire country. Due to them, the population of Ottoman Bulgaria is presumed to have dropped twofold from a peak of approx. 1.8 million (1.2 million Christians and 0.6 million Muslims) in the 1580s to approx. 0.9 million in the 1680s (450,000 Christians and 450,000 Muslims), after growing steadily from a base of approx. 600,000 (450,000 Christians and 150,000 Muslims) in the 1450s.

== First revolts and the Great Powers ==
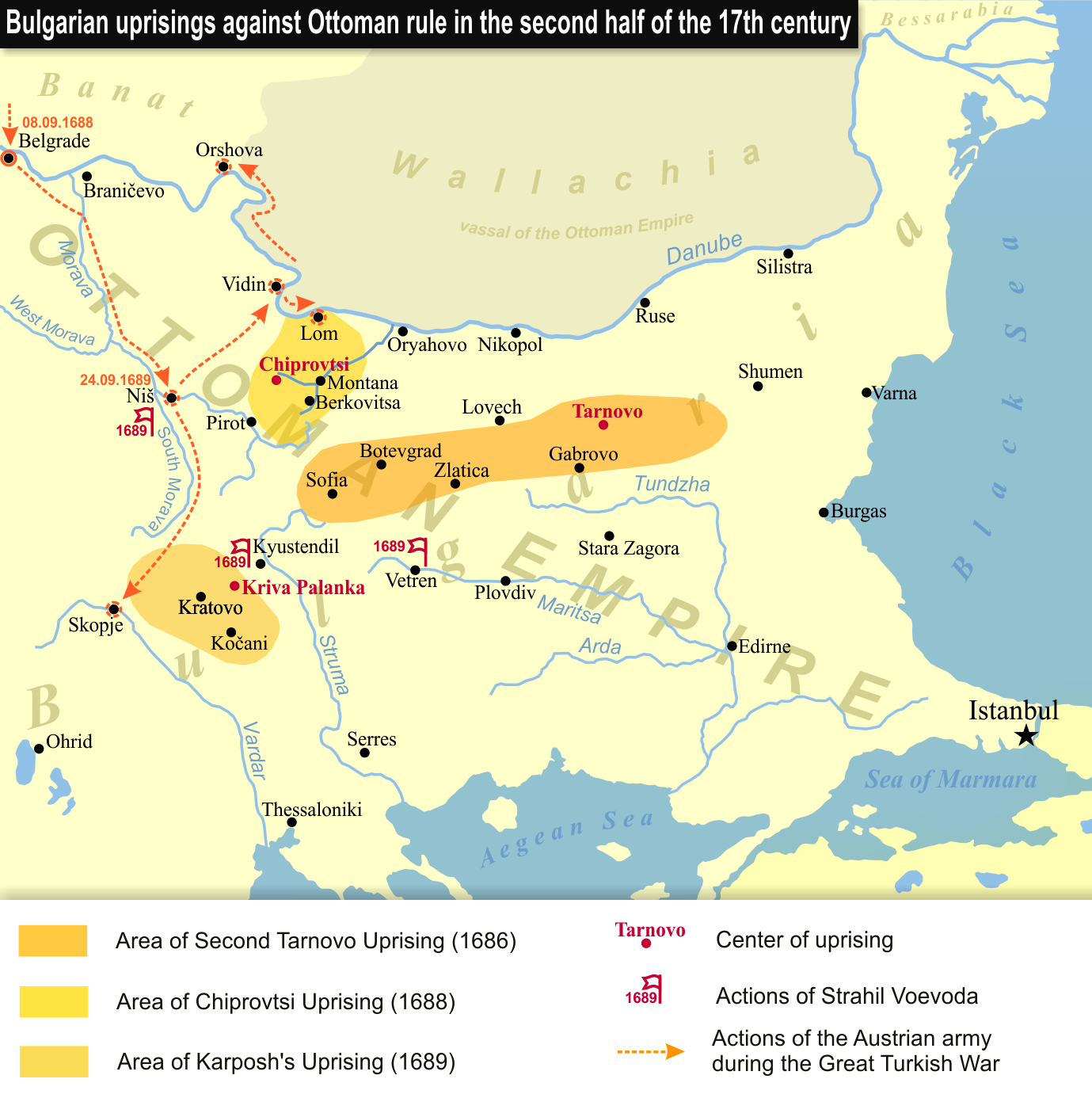
Overtaxation and a chain of Austrian military victories prompted three major Bulgarian uprisings in the late 1600s

While the Ottomans were ascendant, there was overt opposition to their rule. The first revolt began at the time Holy Roman Emperor Sigismund established the chivalric Order of the Dragon, 1408, when two Bulgarian nobles, Konstantin and Fruzhin, revolted and liberated some regions for several years. The earliest evidence of continued local resistance dates from before 1450. Radik (alternatively Radich) was recognised by the Ottomans as a voyvoda of the Sofia region in 1413, but later he turned against them and is regarded as the first hayduk in Bulgarian history. More than a century later, two Tarnovo uprisings occurred - in 1598 (First Tarnovo Uprising) and 1686 (Second Tarnovo Uprising) around the old capital Tarnovo.

Those were followed by the Catholic Chiprovtsi Uprising in 1688 and insurrection in Macedonia led by Karposh in 1689, both provoked by the Austrians as part of their long war with the Ottomans. All of the uprisings were unsuccessful and were brutally suppressed . Most of them resulted in massive waves of exiles, often numbering hundreds of thousands. In 1739 the Treaty of Belgrade between Austrian empire and the Ottoman Empire ended Austrian interest in the Balkans for a century. But by the 18th century the rising power of Russia was making itself felt in the area. The Russians, as fellow Orthodox Slavs, could appeal to the Bulgarians in a way that the Austrians could not. The Treaty of Küçük Kaynarca of 1774 gave Russia the right to interfere in Ottoman affairs to protect the Sultan's Christian subjects.

== Bulgarian National Awakening and Revival ==
Bulgarian lion, a symbol of revolutionary struggle during the second half of the 19th century.

The Bulgarian National Revival was a period of socio-economic development and national integration among Bulgarians under Ottoman rule. It is commonly accepted to have started with the historical book, Istoriya Slavyanobolgarskaya, written in 1762 by Paisius, a Bulgarian monk of the Hilandar monastery at Mount Athos, lead to the National awakening of Bulgaria and the modern Bulgarian nationalism, and lasted until the Liberation of Bulgaria in 1878 as a result of the Russo-Turkish War of 1877-78.

The Millet system was a set of confessional communities in the Ottoman Empire. It referred to the separate legal courts pertaining to "personal law" under which religious communities were allowed to rule themselves under their own system. The Sultan regarded the Ecumenical Patriarch of the Constantinople Patriarchate as the leader of the Orthodox Christian peoples of his empire. After the Ottoman Tanzimat (1839–76) reforms, Nationalism arose in the Empire and the term was used for legally protected religious minority groups, similar to the way other countries use the word nation. New millets were created in 1860 and 1870.

The Bulgarian Exarchate (a de facto autocephalous Orthodox church) was created as separate Bulgarian diocese based on voted ethnic identity. It was unilaterally (without the blessing of the Ecumenical Patriarch) promulgated on 23 May [O.S. 11 May] 1872, in the Bulgarian church in Constantinople in pursuance of the 12 March [O.S. 28 February] 1870 firman of Sultan Abdülaziz of the Ottoman Empire.

The foundation of the Exarchate was the direct result of the struggle of the Bulgarian Orthodox population against the domination of the Greek Patriarchate of Constantinople in the 1850s and 1860s. In 1872, the Patriarchate accused the Exarchate that it introduced ethno-national characteristics in the religious organization of the Orthodox Church, and the secession from the Patriarchate was officially condemned by the Council in Constantinople in September 1872 as schismatic. Nevertheless, Bulgarian religious leaders continued to extend the borders of the Exarchate in the Ottoman Empire by conducting plebiscites in areas contested by both Churches.

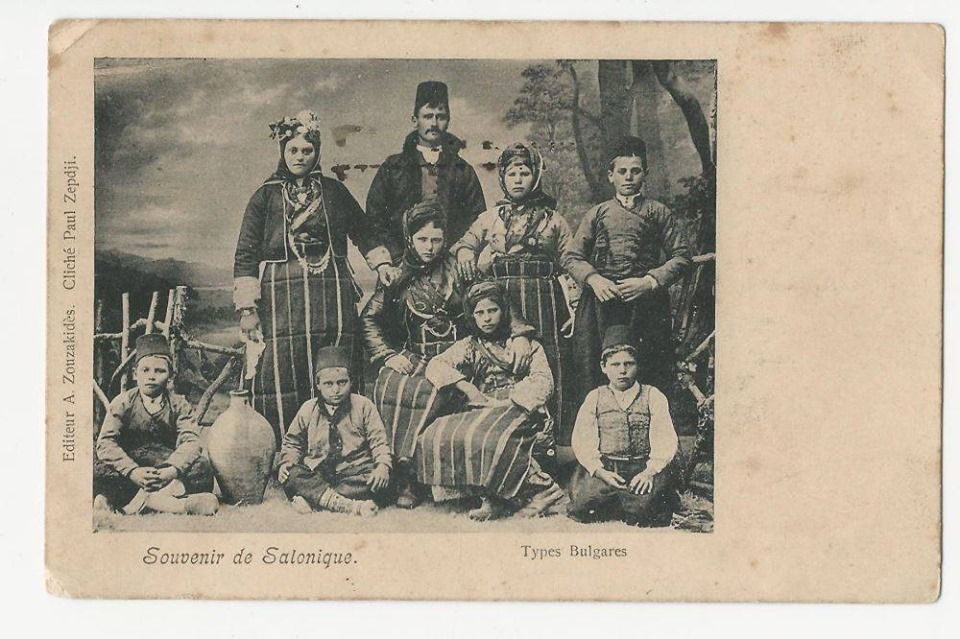
Picture of a Bulgarian family in the city of Salonika (now Thessaloniki), the Ottoman Empire, 19th century

In this way, in the struggle for recognition of a separate Church, the modern Bulgarian nation was created under the name Bulgar Millet.

Also the Bulgarian Uniat Church was created.

Armed resistance to the Ottoman rule escalated in the third quarter of the 19th century and reached its climax with the April Uprising of 1876 that covered part of the ethnically Bulgarian territories of the empire. The uprising, provoked the Constantinople Conference (1876-1877), and along with the strategic interests of Russia on the Balkans, was a reason for the Russo-Turkish War of 1877-1878 that ended with the reestablishment of independent Bulgarians state in 1878, albeit under the Treaty of Berlin Bulgarians were divided, and the territory of the Principality of Bulgaria was far smaller than what Bulgarians had hoped for and what was originally proposed in the Treaty of San Stefano.

== Demographics ==
=== Late 1300s to early 1800s ===
The effect of the Ottoman conquest on Bulgarian demography is uncertain and subject to much contention. However, the population of present-day Bulgaria in the 1450s is estimated to have hit a low of 600,000 people, divided into approx. 450,000 Christians and 150,000 Muslims (or a Christian-to-Muslim ratio of 3:1 or 75 per cent to 25 per cent) following the wide-scale migration of Muslims from Anatolia and emigration of Christians to Wallachia, etc. Both the Christian and Muslim population then grew steadily until the 1580s, reaching approx. 1.8 million, or 1.2 million Christians and 0.6 million Muslims (or a Christian-to-Muslim ratio of 2:1 or 66 per cent to 33 per cent), where the higher growth among the Muslims is attributed to both conversion of Christians and the last waves of Muslim migrants from Anatolia.

As a result of the near-constant war led by the Ottoman Empire from the mid-1500s to the late 1600s, the need for additional tax revenues, the sixfold increase in jizye tax rates, which pauperised the Christian population, the Little Ice Age in the 1600s that caused crop failures and widespread famine and several important Bulgarian uprisings, e.g., the First Tarnovo Uprising, the Chiprovtsi uprising, the Second Tarnovo uprising and Karposh's rebellion, which led to the massive flight of Christian Bulgarians to Wallachia and the Austrian Empire, the population of present-day Bulgaria in the 1680s is assumed to have dropped to approx. 0.9 million in the 1680s, divided into 450,000 Christians and 450,000 Muslims (or a ratio of 1:1). From the early 1700s, the Christian population is assumed to have started growing again.

=== 1831 Ottoman census ===
According to the 1831 Ottoman census, the male population in the Ottoman kazas that fall within the current borders of the Republic of Bulgaria stood at 496,744 people, including 296,769 Christians, 181,455 Muslims, 17,474 Romani, 702 Jews and 344 Armenians. The census only covered healthy taxable men between 15 and 60 years of age, who were free from disability.

Millets in present-day Bulgaria as per 1831 Ottoman Census
1. Rayah (59.8%)
2. Islam millet (36.5%)
3. Gypsies (3.50%)
4. Jews (0.10%)
5. Armenians (0.10%)

1831 Ottoman census (healthy taxable men over 15 only^{2}):
Millet	Republic of Bulgaria borders	
Millet	Healthy taxable men aged 15–60 years	%
Islam millet/Muslims	181,455	36.5%
Rayah/Orthodox Christians^{1}	296,769	59.7%
Gypsies/Romani	17,474	3.5%
Jews	702	0.1%
Armenians	344	0.1%
TOTAL	496,744	100.0%
^{1}No data about the Christian population of the kazas of Selvi (Sevlievo), Izladi (Zlatitsa), Etripolu (Etropole), Lofça (Lovech), Plevne (Pleven), Rahova (Oryahovo) as well as Tirnova (Veliko Tarnovo) and its three constitunet nahiyas.^{2}For figures comparable with post-1878 data, Arkadiev has suggested using the formula N=2 x (Y x 2.02), cf below, which would give a total population of 2,006,845, of whom 1,198,946 Orthodox Christians, 733,078 Muslims, 70,595 Romani, 2,836 Jews and 1,390 Armenians.

By using primary population records from the Danube Vilayet, Bulgarian statistician Dimitar Arkadiev has found that men aged 15–60 represented, on average, 49.5% of all males and that the coefficient that would make it possible to calculate the entire male population is therefore 2.02. To compute total population, male figures are then usually doubled (Bulgarian authors have suggested a coefficient of 1.956, but this has not gained international acceptance). Using this method of computation, (N=2 x (Y x 2.02)), the population of present-day Bulgaria in 1831 would stand at 2,006,845 people.

=== Ottoman population records (1860-1875) for the future Principality of Bulgaria ===
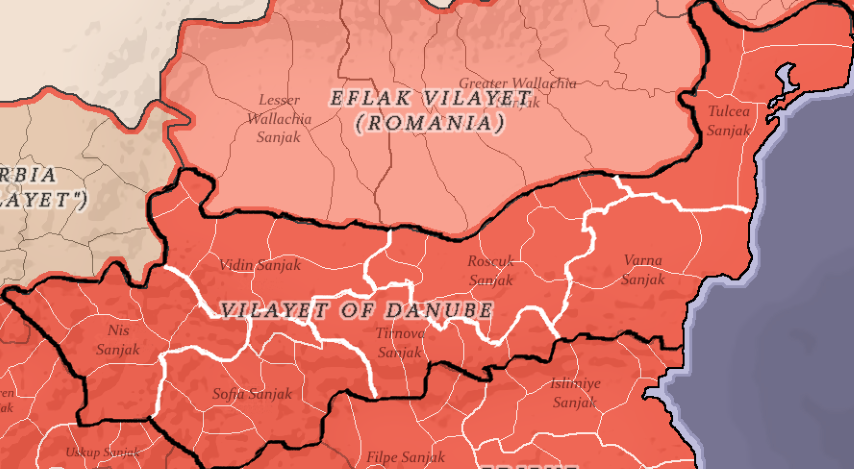
Danube (Tuna) Vilayet with borders of its constituent sanjaks

The Principality of Bulgaria was established on 13 July 1878 and incorporated five of the sanjaks that used to be part of the Ottoman Danube Vilayet:

The Sanjaks of Vidin, Tirnova, Rusçuk, Sofya and Varna, with individual border changes, cf. below. The two other sanjaks in the Danube Vilayet, those of Niš and Tulça, were ceded to Serbia and Romania, respectively.

Ethnoconfessional Groups in the "Five Bulgarian Sanjaks" as per 1865 Pop. Registry
1. Bulgarians (58.9%)
2. Muslims (38.4%)
3. Vlachs (0.99%)
4. Jews (0.47%)
5. Christian Roma (0.47%)
6. Greeks (0.36%)
7. Muslim Roma (0.21%)
8. Armenians (0.17%)

According to the "Kuyûd-ı Atîk" Ottoman Population Register, the male population of the five sanjaks to eventually form the future Principality of Bulgaria was divided into the following ethnoconfessional communities in 1865:

Ethnoconfessional Groups in the Sanjaks of Vidin, Tirnova, Rusçuk, Sofya & Varna acc. to the 1865 Ottoman Population Register (males^{1} only)
Community	Rusçuk Sanjak	Vidin Sanjak	Varna Sanjak	Tırnova Sanjak	Sofya Sanjak	Principality of Bulgaria^{2}
Islam Millet	138,017 (61%)	14,835 (13%)	38,230 (74%)	77,539 (40%)	20,612 (12%)	289,233 (38%)
Muslim Roma	312 (0%)	245 (0%)	118 (0%)	128 (0%)	766 (0%)	1,569 (0%)
Bulgar Millet	85,268 (38%)	93,613 (80%)	9,553 (18%)	113,213 (59%)	142,410 (86%)	444,057 (59%)
Ullah Millet	0 (0%)	7,446 (6%)	0 (0%)	0 (0%)	0 (0%)	7,446 (1%)
Ermeni Millet	926 (0%)	0 (0%)	368 (1%)	0 (0%)	0 (0%)	1,294 (0%)
Rum Millet	0 (0%)	0 (0%)	2,693 (5%)	0 (0%)	0 (0%)	2,693 (0%)
Non-Muslim Romani people	145 (0%)	130 (0%)	999 (2%)	1,455 (1%)	786 (0%)	3,515 (0%)
Yahudi Millet	1,101 (0%)	630 (1%)	14 (0%)	0 (0%)	1,790 (1%)	3,535 (0%)
TOTAL	225,769 (100%)	116,899 (100%)	51,975 (100%)	192,335 (100%)	166,364 (100%)	753,342 (100%)
^{1} Male/female-aggregated estimates for the total population and all ethnoconfessional communities can be calculated using the formula suggested by Ubicini and Michael Palairet (N x 2), which would give a total population for 1865 of 1,506,684 people, divided into 888,114 Bulgarians, 578,466 Muslims, 14,892 Vlachs, etc.^{2} Refers to the Sanjaks of Vidin, Tirnova, Rusçuk, Sofya and Varna, which were united into the Principality of Bulgaria by the decisions of the Congress of Berlin in 1878.

Between 1855 and 1865, the population of the Danube Vilayet underwent seismic changes, as the Ottoman authorities settled more than 300,000 Crimean Tatars and Circassians on the territory of the province. The settlement took place in two waves: one of 142,852 Tatars and Nogais, with a minority of Circassians, who settled in the Danube Vilayet between 1855 and 1862, and a second one of some 35,000 Circassian families (140,000–175,000 settlers), who arrived in 1864.

According to Turkish scholar Kemal Karpat, the Tatar and Circassian colonisation of the vilayet not only offset the heavy Muslim population losses earlier in the century, but also counteracted continued population loss and led to an increase in its Muslim population. In this connection, Karpat also refers to the material differences between Muslim and non-Muslim fertility rates, with non-Muslims growing at the rate of 2% per annum and Muslims usually averaging 0%.

Koyuncu also notes a much higher natural rate of increase among Non-Muslims and attributes the tremendous rate of increase in the Muslim population of the five Bulgarian sanjaks plus the Sanjak of Tulça of 84.23% (220,276 males) vs. 53.29% (229,188 males) for Non-Muslims from 1860 to 1875 to the colonisation of the vilayet with Crimean Tatars and Circassians.

Ethnoconfessional Groups in the "Five Bulgarian sanjaks" as per 1873-74 Census
1. Bulgarians (57.6%)
2. Establ. Muslims (34.2%)
3. Çerkes Muhacir (2.68%)
4. Muslim Roma (2.39%)
5. Misc. Christians (1.47%)
6. Christian Roma (0.70%)
7. Jews (0.44%)
8. Greeks (0.38%)
9. Armenians (0.17%)

Ethnoconfessional groups in the Sanjaks of Vidin, Tirnova, Rusçuk, Sofya & Varna as per the 1875 Salname / 1873-74 Danube Vilayet Census (males^{1} only):
Community	Rusçuk Sanjak	Vidin Sanjak	Varna Sanjak	Tırnova Sanjak	Sofya Sanjak	Principality of Bulgaria^{2}
Islam Millet	164,455 (53%)	20,492 (11%)	52,742 (61%)	88,445 (36%)	27,001 (13%)	353,135 (34%)
Circassian Muhacir	16,588 (5%)	6,522 (4%)	4,307 (5%)	0 (0%)	202 (0%)	27,589 (3%)
Muslim Roma	9,579 (3%)	2,783 (2%)	2,825 (3%)	6,545 (3%)	2,964 (1%)	24,696 (2%)
Bulgar Millet	114,792 (37%)	131,279 (73%)	21,261 (25%)	148,713 (60%)	179,202 (84%)	595,247 (58%)
Vlachs, Catholics, etc.	500 (0%)	14,690 (8%)	0 (0%)	0 (0%)	0 (0%)	15,190 (1%)
Rum Millet (Greeks)	0 (0%)	0 (0%)	3,421 (4%)	494 (0%)	0 (0%)	3,915 (0%)
Non-Muslim Roma	1,790 (1%)	2,048 (1%)	331 (0%)	1,697 (1%)	1,437 (1%)	7,303 (1%)
Ermeni Millet	991 (0%)	0 (0%)	808 (1%)	0 (0%)	0 (0%)	1,799 (0%)
Yahudi Millet	1,102 (0%)	1,009 (1%)	110 (0%)	0 (0%)	2,374 (1%)	4,595 (0%)
TOTAL	309,797 (100%)	178,823 (100%)	85,805 (100%)	245,894 (100%)	213,180 (100%)	1,033,499 (100%)
^{1} Male/female-aggregated estimates for the total population and all ethnoconfessional communities can be calculated using the formula suggested by Ubicini and Michael Palairet (N x 2), which would give a total population for 1875 of 2,066,998, divided into 1,190,494 Bulgarians, 706,270 Established Muslims, 55,178 Circassian Muhacir, 49,392 Muslim Romani, 30,380 Miscellaneous Christians, 14,606 Christian Romani, 9,190 Jews, 7,830 Greeks and 3,598 Armenians.^{2} Refers to the Sanjaks of Vidin, Tirnova, Rusçuk, Sofya and Varna, which were united into the Principality of Bulgaria by the decisions of the Congress of Berlin in 1878.

The Congress of Berlin ceded the kaza of Cuma-i Bâlâ from the Sanjak of Sofia (male Muslim population of 2,896 and male non-Muslim population of 8,038) to the Ottoman Empire and the kaza of Mankalya from the Sanjak of Varna (male Muslim population of 6,675 and male non-Muslim population of 499) to Romania and attached the kaza of Iznebol (male Muslim population of 149 and male non-Muslim population of 7,072) from the Sanjak of Niš to the Principality of Bulgaria.

Ethnoconfessional Groups in the Future Principality of Bulgaria in 1875
1. Bulgarians (57.0%)
2. Turks (26.2%)
3. Muslim Muhacir (10.3%)
4. Muslim Roma (2.35%)
5. Misc. Christians (1.46%)
6. Pomaks (0.96%)
7. Christian Roma (0.70%)
8. Jews (0.44%)
9. Greeks (0.38%)
10. Armenians (0.17%)

At the same time, a flash summary of the results of the Danube Vilayet Census published in the Danube Official Gazette on 18 October 1874 (also covering the Sanjak of Tulça) gave twice as many male Circassian Muhacir, 64,398 vs. 30,573, and slightly fewer "established Muslims" than the final results published in 1875. According to Turkish Ottomanist Koyuncu, 13,825 male Circassians were carried over to the "established Muslims" column and additional 20,000 were left out or simply lost in the carry-over.

The division of Muslims into "Established" and "Muhacir" in the 1873-1874 Census and the 1875 Ottoman Salname was not based on origin, as the name might suggest, but on "taxability". Thus, colonists whose tax exemption had expired and were liable to taxation (i.e., those of them who had settled prior to 1862—Crimean Tatars, Nogais, etc. and a minority of Circassians) were counted as "Established", while colonists who still benefited from a tax exemption (as a rule, Circassians arriving in 1864 or later) were regarded as "Muhacir". Contemporary European geographers, such as German-English Ravenstein, French Bianconi and German Kiepert similarly counted Crimean Tatars with Turks in Islam millet.

Unlike the Circassian colonisation in 1864 and later years, where precise numbers are elusive, the settlement of Crimean Tatars, Nogais, etc. in 1855-1862 has been documented minutely. Out of a total of 34,344 households with 142,852 members (or 4.16 members per household on average) settled along the Danube, a total of 22,360 households with some 93,000 members were given land in kazas that became part of the Principality of Bulgaria.

Adjusting for territorial changes (net loss of 9,422 males, or 18,844 people, for the Est. Muslims and 1,465 males, or 2,930 people, for the Bulgarians), the incorrect entry or carry-over of Muhacir from the '73-74 Census (net loss of 13,825 males, or 27,650 people, for the Est. Muslims and net gain of 33,825 males, or 67,650 people, for the Muhacir), the categorisation of the first wave of refugees as Established (net loss and net gain of 93,000 people for the Established Muslims and Muhacir, respectively), and considering that the Est. Muslims category was also estimated to include some 20,000 Pomaks, mostly living in the region of Lovech. the population living in the future Principality of Bulgaria in 1875 was estimated at 2,085,224 people, of whom 1,187,564 were Bulgarians (56.96%); 546,776 Turks (26.22%); 215,828 Crimean and Circassian Muhacir (10.35%); 49,392 Muslim Romani (2.35%); 30,380 Miscellaneous Christians (1.46%); 20,000 Pomaks (0.96%); 14,606 Christian Romani (0.70%); 9,190 Jews (0.44%); 7,830 Greeks (0.38%); 3,598 Armenians (0.17%).

Of particular note is that fully 10% of the total population, and 25% of all Muslims in the sanjaks, were made up of non-native refugees/colonists, who had arrived only 10 to 20 years before, and whose area of settlement had been carefully picked by the Ottoman authorities in order to: increase Muslim population on the Balkans; cordon off Bulgaria from its neighbours and aid in fighting against a future Russian invasion, act as a counterbalance to Rumelia's Christian population.

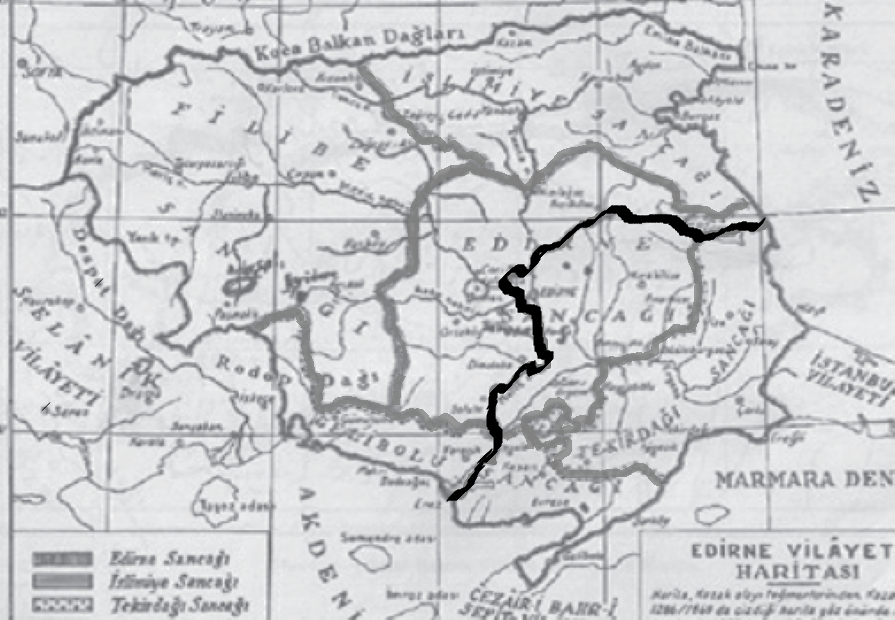
1869 map of the Edirne Vilayet & sanjaks, with superimposed borders of Modern Turkey

In the words of Nusret Pasha, Head of the Silistra Eylaet Colonisation Commission himself, to Hürriyet on 19 October 1868, the Circassians were settled along the Danube in order to serve as live fortification and barrier against Russia.

=== Ottoman population records (1876) for the future Eastern Rumelia ===
The other Bulgarian territory to be carved out of the Ottoman Empire was the autonomous province of Eastern Rumelia. It incorporated the Sanjak of İslimye, most of the Sanjak of Filibe (without the Ahi Çelebi/Smolyan and Sultanyeri/Momchilgrad kazas), a smaller part of the Sanjak of Edirne (the Kızılağaç/Elhovo kaza and Manastır/Topolovgrad nahiya), along with parts of the Üsküdar and Çöke nahiyas, again from the Sanjak of Edirne.

The following are district-by-district population records from the 1876 Ottoman salname, based on the Adrianople Vilayet census of 1875. As is common for Ottoman statistics, figures refer to males only (figures at the bottom are male-female aggregated estimates):

Ethnoconfessional Groups in the Future Eastern Rumelia in 1876
1. Bulgarians (58.0%)
2. Turks (28.2%)
3. Greeks (3.91%)
4. Muslim Roma (3.47%)
5. Pomaks (2.74%)
6. Muhacir (2.19%)
7. Christian Roma (0.73%)
8. Jews (0.64%)
9. Armenians (0.17%)

Ethnoconfessional Groups in the Future Eastern Rumelia as per the 1876 Ottoman Salname / 1875 Adrianople Vilayet Census
Kaza (District)
Kaza (District)	Islam millet	%	Bulgar & Rum millet	%	Ermeni millet	%	Roman Catholic	%	Yahudi millet	%	Muslim Roma	%	Non-Muslim Roma	%	Total	%
Filibe/Plovdiv	35,400	28.1	80,165	63.6	380	0.3	3,462	2.7	691	0.5	5,174	4.1	495	0.4	125,767	100.00
Pazarcık/Pazardzhik	10,805	22.8	33,395	70.5	94	0.2	-	0.0	344	0.7	2,120	4.5	579	1.2	47,337	100.00
Hasköy/Haskovo	33,323	55.0	25,503	42.1	3	0.0	-	0.0	65	0.1	1,548	2.6	145	0.2	60,587	100.00
Zağra-i Atik/Stara Zagora	6,677	20.0	24,857	74.5	-	0.0	-	0.0	740	2.2	989	3.0	90	0.3	33,353	100.00
Kızanlık/Kazanlak	14,365	46.5	14,906	48.2	-	0.0	-	0.0	219	0.7	1,384	4.5	24	0.0	30,898	100.00
Çırpan/Chirpan	5,158	23.9	15,959	73.8	-	0.0	-	0.0	-	0.0	420	1.9	88	0.4	21,625	100.00
~~Ahi Çelebi/Smolyan~~^{1}	~~8,197~~	~~57.8~~	~~5,346~~	~~37.7~~	~~268~~	~~1.9~~	-	~~0.0~~	-	~~0.0~~	~~377~~	~~2.7~~	-	~~0.0~~	~~14,188~~	~~100.00~~
~~Sultanyeri/Momchilgrad~~^{1}	~~13,336~~	~~96.9~~	~~262~~	~~1.9~~	-	~~0.0~~	-	0.0	-	0.0	~~159~~	1.2	-	0.0	~~13,757~~	~~100.00~~
Filibe sanjak subtotal	105,728	33.07	194,785	60.92	477	0.15	3,642	1.14	2,059	0.64	11,635	3.64	1,421	0.44	319,747	100.00
İslimye/Sliven	8,392	29.8	17,975	63.8	143	0.5	-	0.0	158	0.6	596	2.1	914	3.2	28,178	100.00
Yanbolu/Yambol	4,084	30.4	8,107	60.4	-	0.0	-	0.0	396	3.0	459	3.4	377	3.2	13,423	100.00
Misivri/Nesebar	2,182	40.0	3,118	51.6	-	0.0	-	0.0	-	0.0	153	2.8	-	0.0	5,453	100.00
Karinâbâd/Karnobat	7,656	60.5	3,938	31.1	-	0.0	-	0.0	250	2.0	684	5.4	125	1.0	12,653	100.00
Aydos/Aytos	10,858	76.0	2,735	19.2	19	0.1	-	0.0	36	0.2	584	4.1	46	0.3	14,278	100.00
Zağra-i Cedid/Nova Zagora	5,310	29.4	11,777	65.2	-	0.0	-	0.0	-	0.0	880	4.9	103	0.6	18,070	100.00
Ahyolu/Pomorie	1,772	33.7	3,113	59.2	-	0.0	-	0.0	-	0.0	378	7.2	2	0.0	5,265	100.00
Burgas	4,262	22.1	14,179	73.6	46	0.2	-	0.0	4	0.0	448	2.3	320	1.6	19,259	100.00
İslimye sanjak subtotal	44,516	38.2	64,942	55.7	208	0.2	-	0.0	844	0.6	4,182	3.6	1,887	1.6	116,579	100.00
Male Population; İslimye & Filibe sanjak	150,244	34.43	259,727	59.53	685	0.16	3,642	0.83	2,903	0.67	15,817	3.63	3,308	0.76	436,362	100.00
Total Population^{3} Islimiye & Filibe sanjak	300,488	34.43	519,454	59.53	1,370	0.16	7,284	0.83	5,806	0.67	31,634	3.63	6,616	0.76	872,652	100.00
Kızılağaç/Elhovo^{2}	1,425	9.6	11,489	89.0	N/A	N/A	N/A	N/A	N/A	N/A	N/A	N/A	N/A	N/A	12,914	100.00
Manastır/Topolovgrad^{2}	409	1.5	26,139	98.5	N/A	N/A	N/A	N/A	N/A	N/A	N/A	N/A	N/A	N/A	26,548	100.00
Eastern Rumelia GRAND TOTAL^{3}	302,322	33.15	557,082	61.08	1,370	0.15	7,284	0.79	5,806	0.64	31,634	3.47	6,616	0.72	912,114	100.00
^{1}Kaza to remain in the Ottoman Empire.^{2}Figures available for total population and for Islam millet and Bulgar millet/Rum millet only.^{3} Male/female aggregated figures presuming equal number of men and women, as suggested by Ubicini and Palairet.

According to British diplomat Drummond-Wolff, apart from Turks, Islam millet also included 25,000 Muslim Bulgarians, 10,000 Tatars and Nogays and 10,000 Circassians. At the same time, British historian R.J. Moore has identified 4,000 male Greeks (or 8,000 in total) in the Sanjak of Filibe, and the British consulary service additional 22,000 in the Sanjak of İslimye and 5,693 in the Manastır nahiya, or a total of 35,693 Greeks, who had been counted together with the Orthodox Bulgarians. In turn, all Catholics were Bulgarian Paulicians.

Thus, Eastern Rumelia's total population of 912,114 people prior to the Russo-Turkish War (1877-1878) was divided into 528,673 Christian Bulgarians (57.96%), 257,322 Turks (28.21%), 35,693 Greeks (3.91%), 31,634 Muslim Romani (3.47%), 25,000 Pomaks or Muslim Bulgarians (2.74%), 20,000 Muhacir (2.19%), 6,616 Christian Romani (0.73%), 5,806 Jews (0.64%) and 1,370 Armenians (0.15%).

== Gallery ==
Bulgarian man and woman of Sofia, from Les costumes populaires de la Turquie en 1873, published under the patronage of the Ottoman Imperial Commission for the 1873 Vienna World's Fair

Bulgarian woman of Roustchouk and Bulgarian men of Vidin, from Les costumes populaires de la Turquie en 1873, published under the patronage of the Ottoman Imperial Commission for the 1873 Vienna World's Fair

Bulgarian men of Koyuntepe and Ahı Çelebi and Muslim man of Filibe, from Les costumes populaires de la Turquie en 1873, published under the patronage of the Ottoman Imperial Commission for the 1873 Vienna World's Fair

Bulgarian woman of Ahı Çelebi and Greek woman of Haskovo, from Les costumes populaires de la Turquie en 1873, published under the patronage of the Ottoman Imperial Commission for the 1873 Vienna World's Fair

== See also ==
- Ottoman Vardar Macedonia
- Bulgarian Exarchate
- April Uprising of 1876
- Constantinople Conference
- Russo-Turkish War of 1877–1878
- Treaty of San Stefano
- Treaty of Berlin (1878)
- Kresna–Razlog uprising
- Ilinden–Preobrazhenie Uprising
