= Karaulov =

Karaulov (Russian: Караулов) is a Russian masculine surname; its feminine counterpart is Karaulova. It may refer to:

- Ivan Karaulov (born 1980), Kazakhstani ski jumper
- Sergei Karaulov (born 1982), Uzbekistani-Russian basketball player
- Yulianna Karaulova (born 1988), Russian singer
