= Ski jumping at the 2011 Asian Winter Games – Men's large hill team =

Men's large hill team at the 2011 Asian Winter Games
- Venue: International Ski Jump Complex
- Dates: 2 February 2011
- Competitors: 16 from 4 nations

Medalists
gold medal	Japan; Kazuyoshi Funaki, Yuhei Sasaki, Yuta Watase, Kazuya Yoshioka
silver medal	Kazakhstan; Alexey Korolev, Radik Zhaparov, Yevgeniy Levkin, Nikolay Karpenko
bronze medal	South Korea; Choi Heung-chul, Kang Chil-ku, Choi Yong-jik, Kim Hyun-ki

The men's large hill K125 individual competition at the 2011 Asian Winter Games in Almaty, Kazakhstan was held on 2 February at the International Ski Jump Complex.

== Schedule ==
All times are Almaty Time (UTC+06:00)

Date	Time	Event
Wednesday, 2 February 2011	10:05	Final

== Results ==
Rank	Team	1st round		Final round		Total
Rank	Team	Distance	Score	Distance	Score	Total
1st place, gold medalist(s)	Japan (JPN)		388.4		449.2	837.6
	Kazuyoshi Funaki	114.0	91.2	125.5	114.4	
	Yuhei Sasaki	115.0	93.0	121.5	105.7	
	Yuta Watase	119.5	101.6	123.0	108.9	
	Kazuya Yoshioka	119.5	102.6	129.0	120.2	
2nd place, silver medalist(s)	Kazakhstan (KAZ)		369.7		424.3	794.0
	Alexey Korolev	105.5	75.9	117.5	99.0	
	Radik Zhaparov	114.5	93.6	122.5	106.5	
	Yevgeniy Levkin	119.5	102.1	123.0	109.4	
	Nikolay Karpenko	117.0	98.1	123.0	109.4	
3rd place, bronze medalist(s)	South Korea (KOR)		351.4		418.9	770.3
	Choi Heung-chul	119.5	102.1	124.5	111.6	
	Kang Chil-ku	101.5	67.2	113.0	89.4	
	Choi Yong-jik	116.5	97.2	120.0	104.0	
	Kim Hyun-ki	110.5	84.9	125.5	113.9	
4	China (CHN)		154.2		197.4	351.6
	Li Yang	97.5	55.5	105.0	69.5	
	Yang Guang	90.5	41.4	95.5	50.4	
	Xing Chenhui	70.0	2.5	77.5	16.5	
	Tian Zhandong	96.0	54.8	100.0	61.0	
