= Kang Chil-ku =

South Korean ski jumper

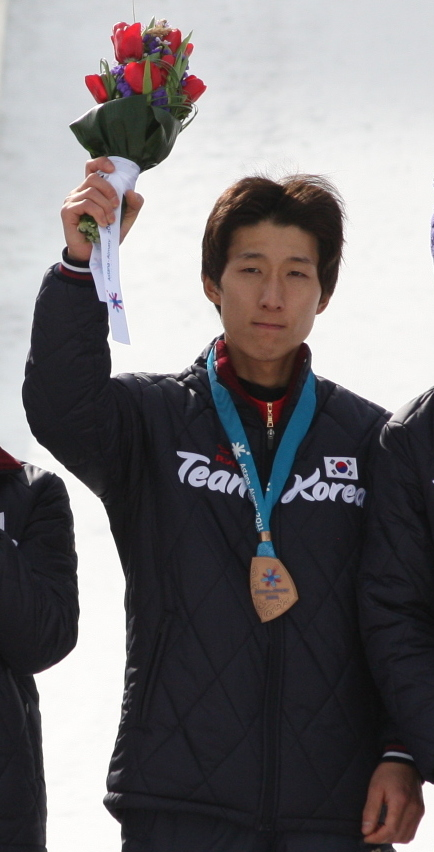
- 2011 Asian Winter Games

Personal information
- Born: August 8, 1984 (age 41) Gunsan
- Height: 170 cm (5 ft 7 in)
- Weight: 59 kg (130 lb)

Korean name
- Hangul: 강칠구
- Hanja: 姜 七求
- RR: Gang Chilgu
- MR: Kang Ch'ilgu
Medal record
Men's ski jumping
Representing South Korea
Asian Games
Gold medal – first place	2003 Aomori	Normal hill team
Bronze medal – third place	2011 Astana-Almaty	Large hill team

Kang Chil-ku (Korean: 강칠구; born August 8, 1984), also spelled Kang Chil-gu, is a South Korean ski jumper who has competed since 2001. He finished eighth in the team large hill and 46th in the individual normal hill events at the 2002 Winter Olympics in Salt Lake City.

Kang finished 30th in the individual event of the 2002 Ski-flying World Championships at Harrachov. His best World Cup finish was 29th in a large hill event in Finland in 2003.

Kang's lone career victory was in a normal hill event at an FIS Race in Italy in 2003.

== Filmography ==
=== Television show ===
Year	Title	Network	Role	Notes	Ref.
2022–2023	The Gentlemen's League	JTBC/Netflix	Cast member	Season 2	
