= Nicholas Alexander (ski jumper) =

American ski jumper

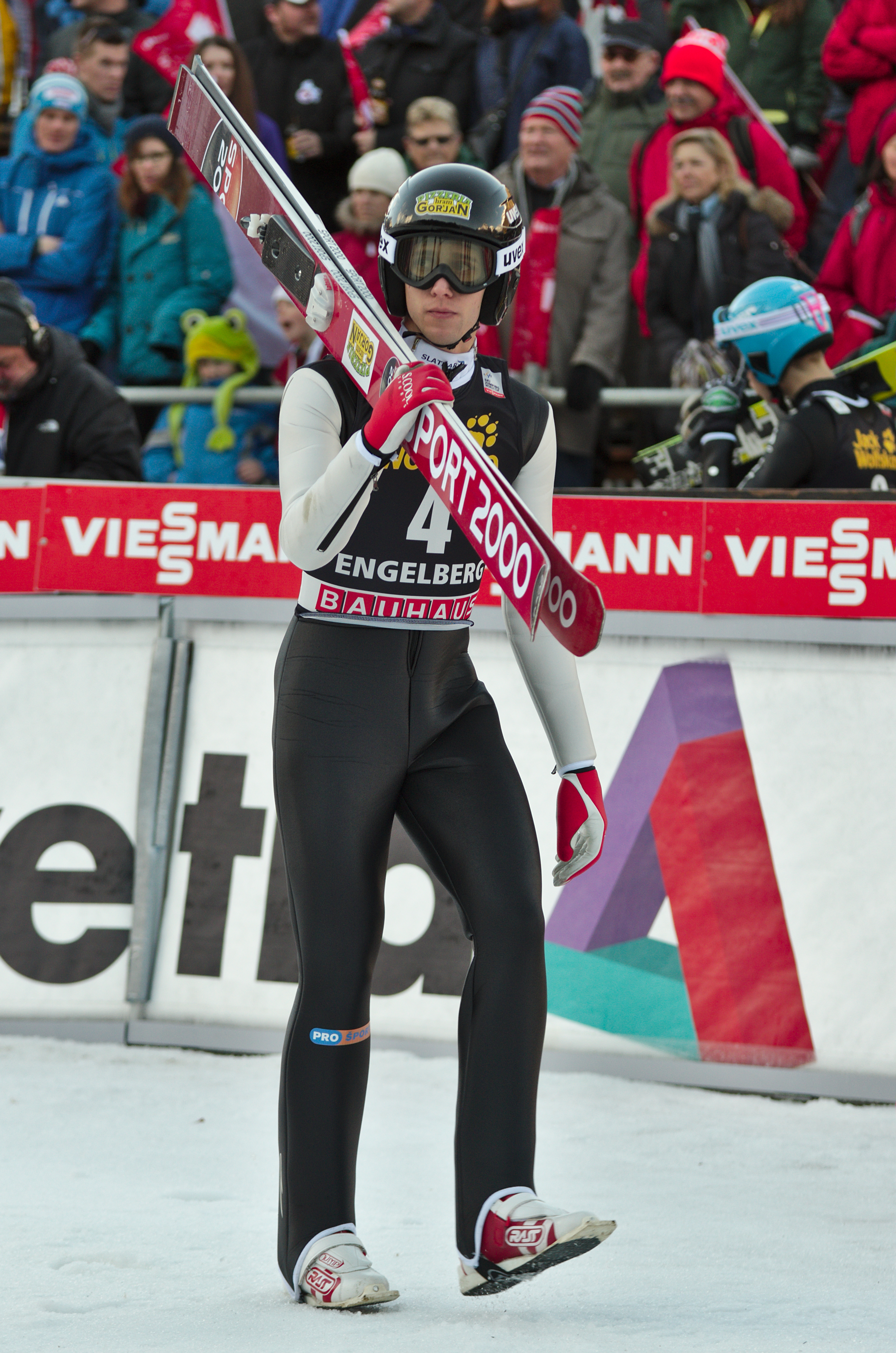

Personal information
- Nationality: United States
- Born: August 24, 1988 (age 37) Brattleboro, Vermont, U.S.
- Height: 5 ft 11 in (1.80 m)

Sport
- Sport: Skiing
- Club: Lebanon Outing Club

World Cup career
- Seasons: 2010; 2013–2016
- Indiv. starts: 21
- Team starts: 6

Achievements and titles
- Personal bests: 184 m (604 ft); Planica, 19 March 2010
- Updated on August 2, 2016

Nicholas Alexander (born August 24, 1988) is an American former ski jumper. who competed in the 2010 and 2014 Winter Olympics as a member of Team USA

== Career ==
=== Early years ===
He was born in Brattleboro, Vermont, and lives in Lebanon, New Hampshire. Alexander learned to ski and ski jump from members of the Lebanon Outing Club at the Storrs Hill Ski area. He made his world cup debut in Kuusamo in 2009. He is a member of the U.S. Men's Ski Jumping Team and he is an Olympian who competed in the 2010 Winter Olympics.

=== U.S. Nationals ===
Alexander won the 2013 Men's U.S. National Ski Jumping Championship in Lake Placid, NY on the normal Olympic hill. He was second that same year in 2013 in the Men's U.S. National Ski Jumping Championship in Park City, UT on the large Olympic hill. He also won the 2009 Men's U.S. National Ski Jumping Championship in Lake Placid, NY, on the only hill jumped that year, the normal Olympic hill.

=== 2010 season ===
His best winter World Cup finish was 38th in the large hill event in March 2010 in Finland.

Alexander finished tenth in the team flying hill event at the FIS Ski Flying World Championships 2010 in Planica. He qualified in 29th place for the individual competition at this same event. He set his personal best 184 metres (604 ft) in this event.

At the 2010 Winter Olympics, he finished 11th in the team large hill, 40th in the individual large hill, and 41st in the individual normal hill events.

== World Cup ==
=== Standings ===
Season	Overall	4H	SF	NT
2009/10	—	56	—	57
2012/13	—	—	—	N/A
2013/14	—	—	—	N/A
2014/15	78	—	—	N/A
2015/16	–	61	—	N/A

=== Individual starts (21) ===
Season	1	2	3	4	5	6	7	8	9	10	11	12	13	14	15	16	17	18	19	20	21	22	23	24	25	26	27	28	29	30	31	Points
2009/10	Kuusamo	Lillehammer	Lillehammer	Engelberg	Engelberg	Engelberg	Oberstdorf	Garmisch-Partenkirchen	Innsbruck	Bischofshofen	Bad Mitterndorf	Bad Mitterndorf	Sapporo	Sapporo	Zakopane	Zakopane	Oberstdorf	Klingenthal	Willingen	Lahti	Kuopio	Lillehammer	Oslo									0
2009/10	44	46	–	q	45	42	42	q	48	q	q	–	–	–	–	–	q	–	–	38	53	q	q									0
2012/13	Lillehammer	Lillehammer	Kuusamo	Krasnaja Polana	Krasnaja Polana	Engelberg	Engelberg	Oberstdorf	Garmisch-Partenkirchen	Innsbruck	Bischofshofen	Wisła	Zakopane	Sapporo	Sapporo	Vikersund	Vikersund	Harrachov	Harrachov	Klingenthal	Oberstdorf	Lahti	Kuopio	Trondheim	Oslo	Planica	Planica					0
2012/13	–	–	–	–	–	–	–	–	–	–	–	–	–	–	–	–	–	–	–	–	–	–	q	–	–	q	–					0
2013/14	Klingenthal	Kuusamo	Lillehammer	Lillehammer	Titisee-Neustadt	Titisee-Neustadt	Engelberg	Engelberg	Oberstdorf	Garmisch-Partenkirchen	Innsbruck	Bischofshofen	Tauplitz	Tauplitz	Wisła	Zakopane	Sapporo	Sapporo	Willingen	Willingen	Falun	Lahti	Lahti	Kuopio	Trondheim	Oslo	Planica	Planica				0
2013/14	–	q	q	q	q	q	q	q	–	–	–	–	–	–	–	–	–	–	–	–	45	–	–	q	q	q	–	–				0
2014/15	Klingenthal	Kuusamo	Kuusamo	Lillehammer	Lillehammer	Nizhny Tagil	Nizhny Tagil	Engelberg	Engelberg	Oberstdorf	Garmisch-Partenkirchen	Innsbruck	Bischofshofen	Tauplitz	Wisła	Zakopane	Sapporo	Sapporo	Willingen	Willingen	Titisee-Neustadt	Titisee-Neustadt	Vikersund	Vikersund	Lahti	Kuopio	Trondheim	Oslo	Oslo	Planica	Planica	4
2014/15	q	q	–	–	48	–	–	45	q	q	q	q	q	–	44	–	–	–	42	27	7	q	–	–	–	–	–	–	–	–	–	4
2015/16	Klingenthal	Lillehammer	Lillehammer	Nizhny Tagil	Nizhny Tagil	Engelberg	Engelberg	Oberstdorf	Garmisch-Partenkirchen	Innsbruck	Bischofshofen	Willingen	Zakopane	Sapporo	Sapporo	Trondheim	Vikersund	Vikersund	Vikersund	Lahti	Lahti	Kuopio	Almaty	Almaty	Wisła	Titisee-Neustadt	Planica	Planica	Planica			0
2015/16	–	–	–	–	–	36	q	38	q	q	q	–	q	–	–	47	50	q	q	q	q	q	–	–	–	35	54	q	–			0
