= Radik =

Radik is a given name. Notable people with the name include:

- Radik Bikchentayev (born 1972), Kazakhstani speed skater
- Radik Isayev (born 1989), Russian-born naturalized Azerbaijani taekwondo practitioner
- Radik Khayrullov (born 1992), Russian football player
- Radik Kuliev (born 1992), Russian-Belarusian Greco-Roman wrestler
- Radik Tagirov (born 1982), (the Volga Maniac), Russian serial killer, murdered 31 elderly women in Tatarstan
- Radik Valiev (born 1997), Russian freestyle wrestler
- Radik Vodopyanov (born 1984), Kyrgystani footballer
- Radik Yamlikhanov (born 1968), Russian professional football coach and a former player
- Radik Yusupov (born 1993), Russian former football defender
- Radik Zakiev (born 1986), Russian former professional ice hockey forward
- Radik Zhaparov (born 1984), Kazakh ski jumper
