= Ski jumping at the 2003 Asian Winter Games =

- Venue: Takinosawa Ski Jumping Hill
- Dates: 4–6 February 2003
- Competitors: 14 from 4 nations

Ski jumping at the 2003 Winter Asian Games took place in the Takinosawa Ski Jumping Hill located in the town of Owani, Aomori Prefecture, Japan with two events contested — both men's. This was the first time ski jumping was officially added as a medal sport after being included in previous Winter Asiad programs only as a demonstration sport.

== Schedule ==
F	Final

Event↓/Date →	4th Tue	5th Wed	6th Thu
Men's normal hill individual	F		
Men's normal hill team			F

== Medalists ==
Event	Gold	Silver	Bronze
Normal hill individual	Kazuyoshi Funaki; Japan	Akira Higashi; Japan	Choi Heung-chul; South Korea
Normal hill team	South Korea; Kim Hyun-ki; Choi Heung-chul; Choi Yong-jik; Kang Chil-ku	Japan; Akira Higashi; Yuta Watase; Yasuhiro Shibata; Kazuyoshi Funaki	Kazakhstan; Radik Zhaparov; Pavel Gaiduk; Maxim Polunin; Stanislav Filimonov

== Medal table ==
Rank	Nation	Gold	Silver	Bronze	Total
1	Japan (JPN)	1	2	0	3
2	South Korea (KOR)	1	0	1	2
3	Kazakhstan (KAZ)	0	0	1	1
Totals (3 entries)		2	2	2	6

== Participating nations ==
A total of 14 athletes from 4 nations competed in ski jumping at the 2003 Asian Winter Games:

- Japan (5)
- Kazakhstan (4)
- Kyrgyzstan (1)
- South Korea (4)
