= Ski jumping at the 1996 Asian Winter Games =

- Venue: Yabuli Ski Resort
- Dates: 5–7 February 1996

Ski jumping at the 1996 Asian Winter Games took place in the city of Harbin, China with only two events being contested — both of them men's events.

Both events were only for demonstration; the medals gained here did not officially count towards the final medal tally.

== Medalists ==
Event	Gold	Silver	Bronze
Normal hill individual	Dmitriy Chvykov; Kazakhstan	Alexandr Kolmakov; Kazakhstan	Hitoshi Sakurai; Japan
Normal hill team	Kazakhstan; Maxim Polunin; Andrey Verveykin; Alexandr Kolmakov; Dmitriy Chvykov	Japan; Shinya Tsurumaki; Hitoshi Sakurai; Keisuke Sugiyama; Takuya Takeuchi	China; Liu Shuming; Piao Xuefeng; Wang Shuanglong; Xu Xingwang

== Medal table ==
Rank	Nation	Gold	Silver	Bronze	Total
1	Kazakhstan (KAZ)	2	1	0	3
2	Japan (JPN)	0	1	1	2
3	China (CHN)	0	0	1	1
Totals (3 entries)		2	2	2	6
