= Ski jumping at the 1990 Asian Winter Games =

- Venue: Okurayama Ski Jump Stadium
- Dates: 14 March 1990

Ski jumping at the 1990 Asian Winter Games took place in the city of Sapporo, Japan on 14 March 1990 with only one event, Large hill individual being contested. India was originally scheduled to host the second edition of the games, but due to technical and financial difficulties, it gave up its hosting rights to Japan in 1989. The event was only for demonstration; the medals gained here did not officially count towards the final medal tally.

The event took place at the Okurayama Ski Jump Stadium. The host nation Japan dominated the event by winning all three medals of the competition.

Kazuhiro Higashi of Japan won the competition with a score of 222.0, his teammate Takuya Takeuchi finished second and won the silver with 221.5, another Japanese athlete Takao Oikawa won the bronze medal in this demonstration competition with a score of 219.0.

== Medalists ==
Event	Gold	Silver	Bronze
Large hill individual	Kazuhiro Higashi; Japan	Takuya Takeuchi; Japan	Takao Oikawa; Japan
