= Ivan Karaulov =

Kazakhstani ski jumper (born 1980)

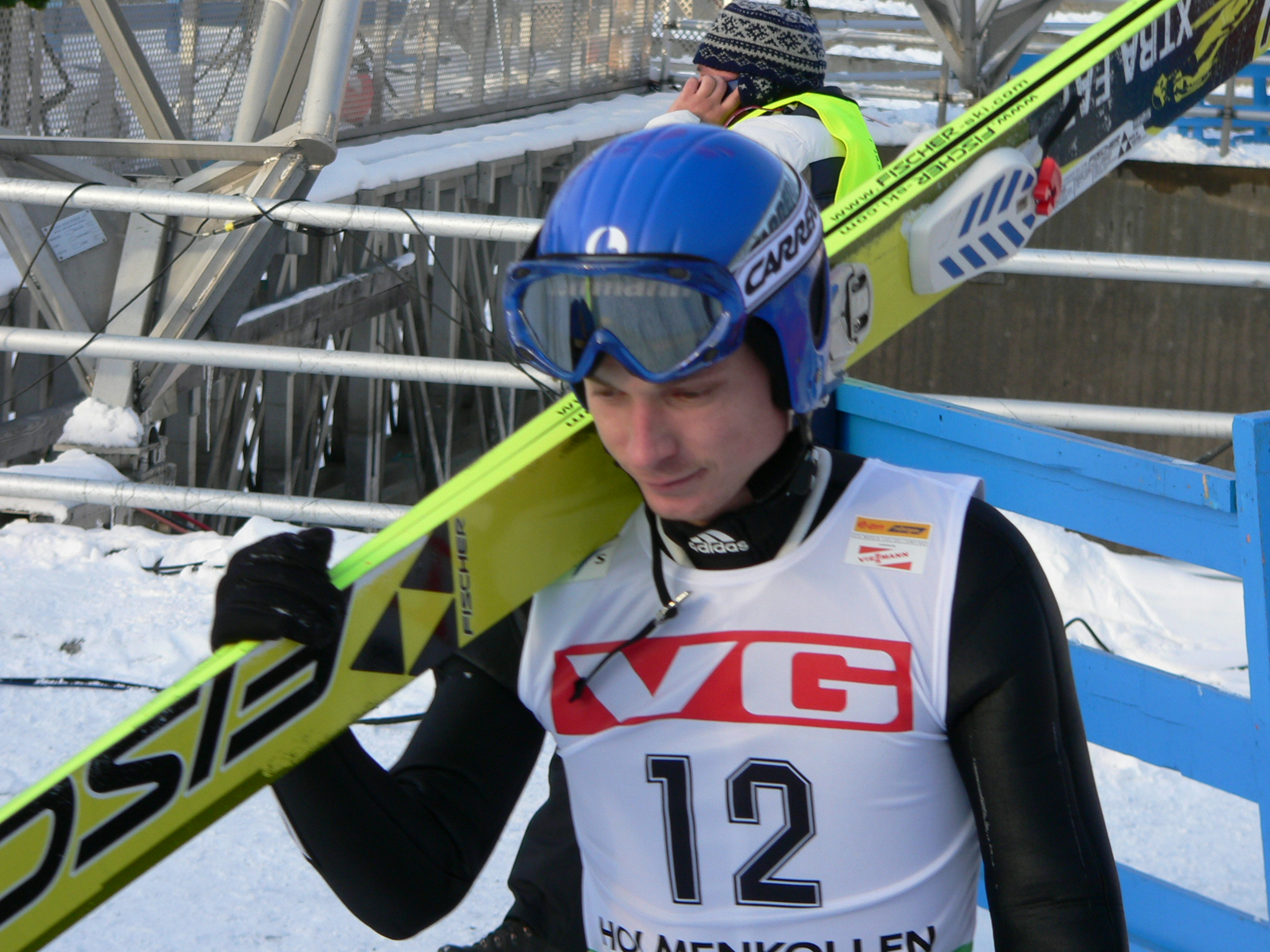
Ivan Karaulov

Ivan Karaulov (born June 23, 1980) is a Kazakhstani ski jumper who has competed since 2003. At the 2006 Winter Olympics in Turin, he finished 12th in the team large hill and 46th in both individual events.

At the FIS Nordic World Ski Championships, Karaulov has finished 11th in team events three times (2005: large, normal; 2007: large) and 29th in the individual normal hill (2005) events.

His best individual World Cup finish was 15th in a large hill event in Japan in 2006. Karaulov's best individual career finish was 10th in a Continental Cup normal hill event in Germany in 2004. In 2004 Karaulov had a pretty dangerous crash in the ski-flying hill in Oberstdorf.
