= Assan Takhtakhunov =

Kazakhstani ski jumper (born 1986)

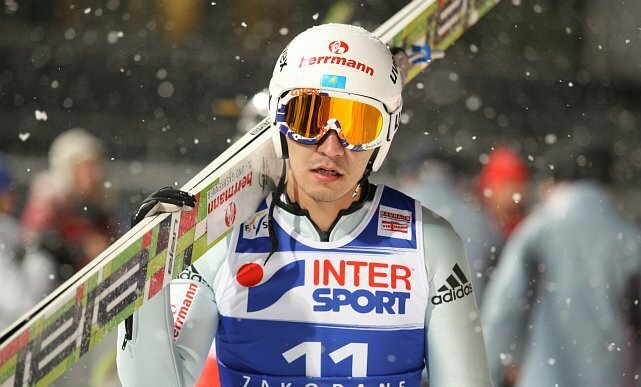
Assan Takhtakhunov

Asan Tahtahunov (born September 25, 1986) is a Kazakhstani ski jumper who has competed since 2003. His current club is Shymbulak.

Tahtahunov made his debut on July 25, 2003 in COC, finishing 26th in his first competition, allowing him to compete in the Ski Jumping World Cup. His first competition was on November 29, in Kuusamo. He accumulated six points during his first World Cup season, with points earned in Liberec (27th) and Oslo (29th).

He finished 26th at the Junior World Cup in Schonach on February 7, 2004. In later seasons, namely 2004–05 and 2005–06, Tahtahunov finished out of the top thirty and did not earn a single point.

The Kazakhstani team competed at the 2006 Winter Olympics, but Tahtahunov did not qualify due to injury.
