= Yang Guang (ski jumper) =

Chinese ski jumper

Yang Guang (Chinese: 杨光; born 11 May 1984) is a Chinese ski jumper who competed in the ski jumping (large hill team) event at the 2006 Winter Olympics.
