= Radik Zhaparov =

Kazakhstani ski jumper (born 1984)

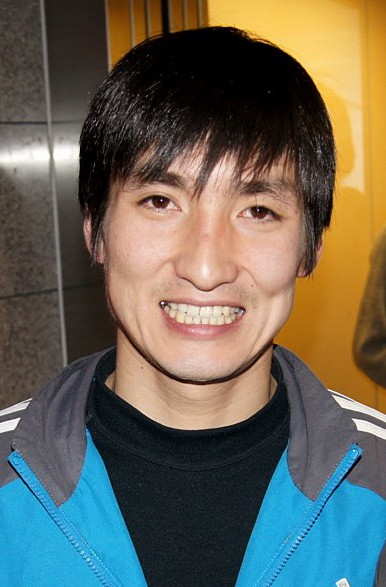
- Zhaparov (2013)

Personal information
- Born: 29 February 1984 (age 42) Shyrgys Qazaqstan, Kazakhstan
- Height: 172 cm (5 ft 8 in)
- Weight: 56 kg (123 lb)

Sport
- Sport: Skiing
Medal record
Men's ski jumping
Representing Kazakhstan
Asian Winter Games
Silver medal – second place	2011 Astana-Almaty	Large hill team
Bronze medal – third place	2003 Aomori	Normal hill team
Bronze medal – third place	2011 Astana-Almaty	Normal hill individual

Radik Zhaparov (born 29 February 1984) is a Kazakh ski jumper who has competed since 2003. At the 2006 Winter Olympics in Turin, he finished 11th in the team large hill and 26th in the individual normal hill events. At the FIS Nordic World Ski Championships, Zhaparov has finished 11th in team events three times (2005: large, normal; 2007: large) and 24th in the individual normal hill (2007) events.

Zharparov's best individual World Cup finish was 11th in a large hill event in Finland in 2007. His best individual career finish was second in an FIS Cup normal hill event in Austria, also in 2007.
