= Yevgeniy Levkin =

Kazakhstani ski jumper (born 1992)

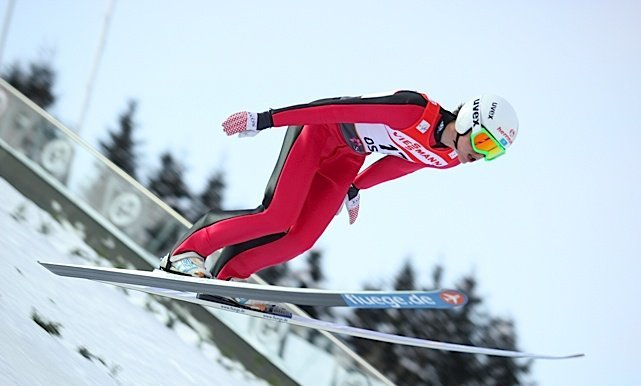

Personal information
- Full name: Yevgeniy Levkin
- Born: October 14, 1992 (age 33) Almaty, Kazakhstan
- Height: 1.78 m (5 ft 10 in)

Sport
- Sport: Skiing
- Club: Almaty

World Cup career
- Seasons: 2009–present
- Indiv. podiums: 0
- Indiv. wins: 0
Medal record
Men's ski jumping
Representing Kazakhstan
Asian Games
Silver medal – second place	2011 Astana-Almaty	Large hill team
Gold medal – first place	2011 Astana-Almaty	Normal hill individual
- Updated on 4 April 2011

Yevgeniy Levkin (born October 14, 1992) is a Kazakhstani ski jumper competing for Almaty Ski Club.

== Career ==
Levkin started ski jumping late and was not one of the best as young.

Levkin's best placement in Continental Cup is a 22nd place. He has also competed in the World Cup, three times. He has also tried to qualify seven times.

=== 2011 ===
In 2011 he took a pretty heavy fall in a World Cup qualification in Bischofshofen. Later 2011 he competed in the 2011 Asian Winter Games in Almaty. Levkin received a silver medal from the team large hill (K-125) competition. He did not do very well in the Large Hill individual competition but in the Normal hill competition Levkin won.
