= Choi Seou =

South Korean ski jumper (born 1982)

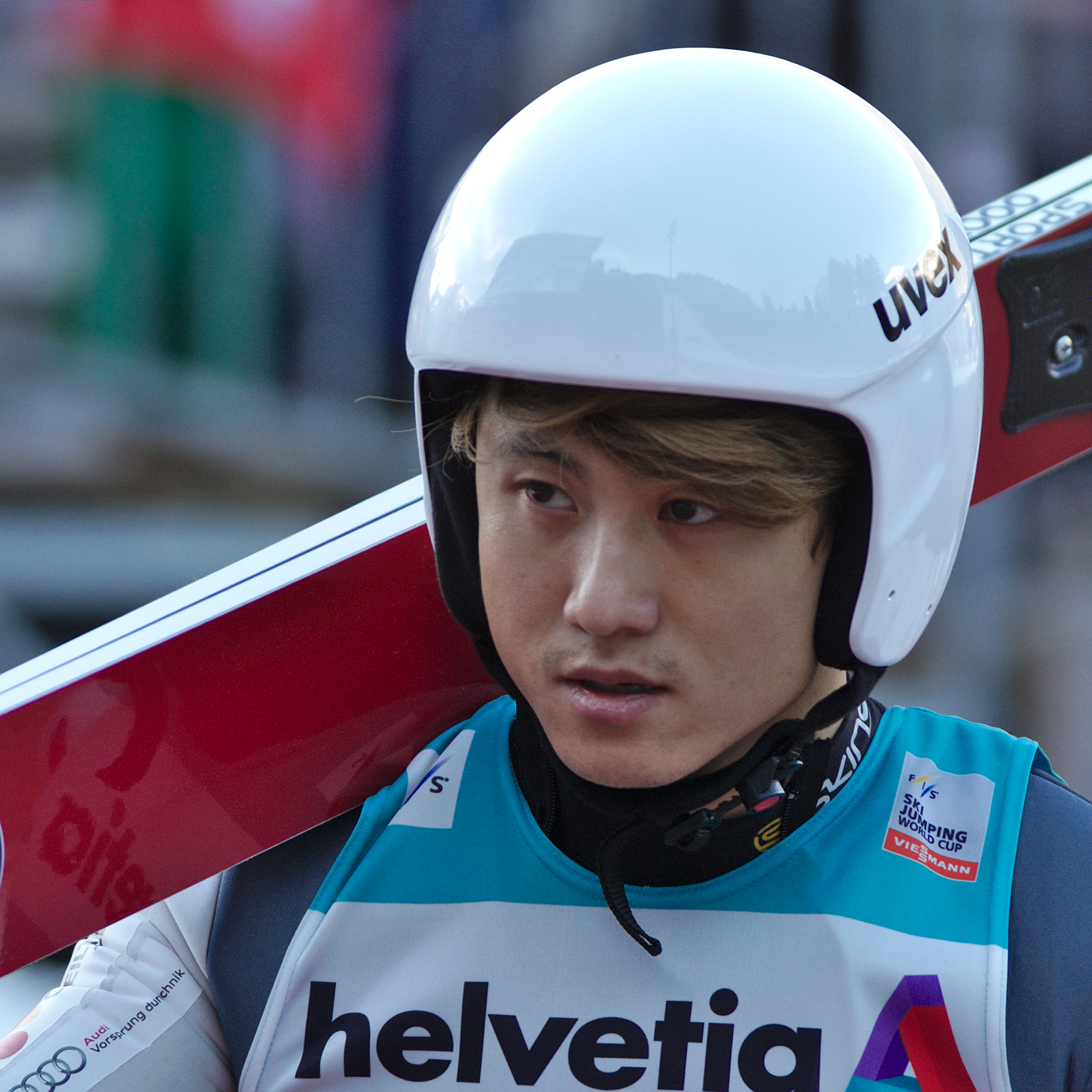

Medal record

Men's ski jumping

Representing Republic of Korea

Asian Games
| Gold medal – first place | 2003 Aomori | Normal hill team |
| Bronze medal – third place | 2011 Astana-Almaty | Large hill team |
| Bronze medal – third place | 2017 Sapporo | Large hill team |

Universiade
| Gold medal – first place | 2003 Tarvisio | Normal hill team |
| Gold medal – first place | 2009 Harbin | Normal hill team |
| Silver medal – second place | 2007 Torino | Normal hill individual |
| Silver medal – second place | 2007 Torino | Normal hill team |

- Choi Seou
- Hangul: 최서우
- Hanja: 崔栖瑀
- RR: Choe Seou
- MR: Ch'oe Sŏu

Former name
- Hangul: 최용직
- Hanja: 崔鎔直
- RR: Choe Yongjik
- MR: Ch'oe Yongjik

Choi Seou (Korean: 최서우; formerly Choi Yong-jik; born December 3, 1982) is a South Korean ski jumper who has been competing since 1998. Competing in six Winter Olympics, he earned his best finish of eighth in the team large hill event at Salt Lake City in 2002 Winter Olympics and his best individual finish of 34th in the individual normal hill event at those same games.

Choi's best finish at the FIS Nordic World Ski Championships was tenth in the team normal hill event at Oberstdorf in 2005 while his best individual finish was 22nd in the individual normal hill events at those same championships. He finished 29th in the individual event of the FIS Ski-Flying World Championships 2000 in Vikersund.

Choi's best individual World Cup finish was 25th in an individual large hill event in Germany in 2007.

He changed his name Choi Yong-jik to Choi Seou in 2011.
