= Yuta Watase =

Japanese ski jumper (born 1982)

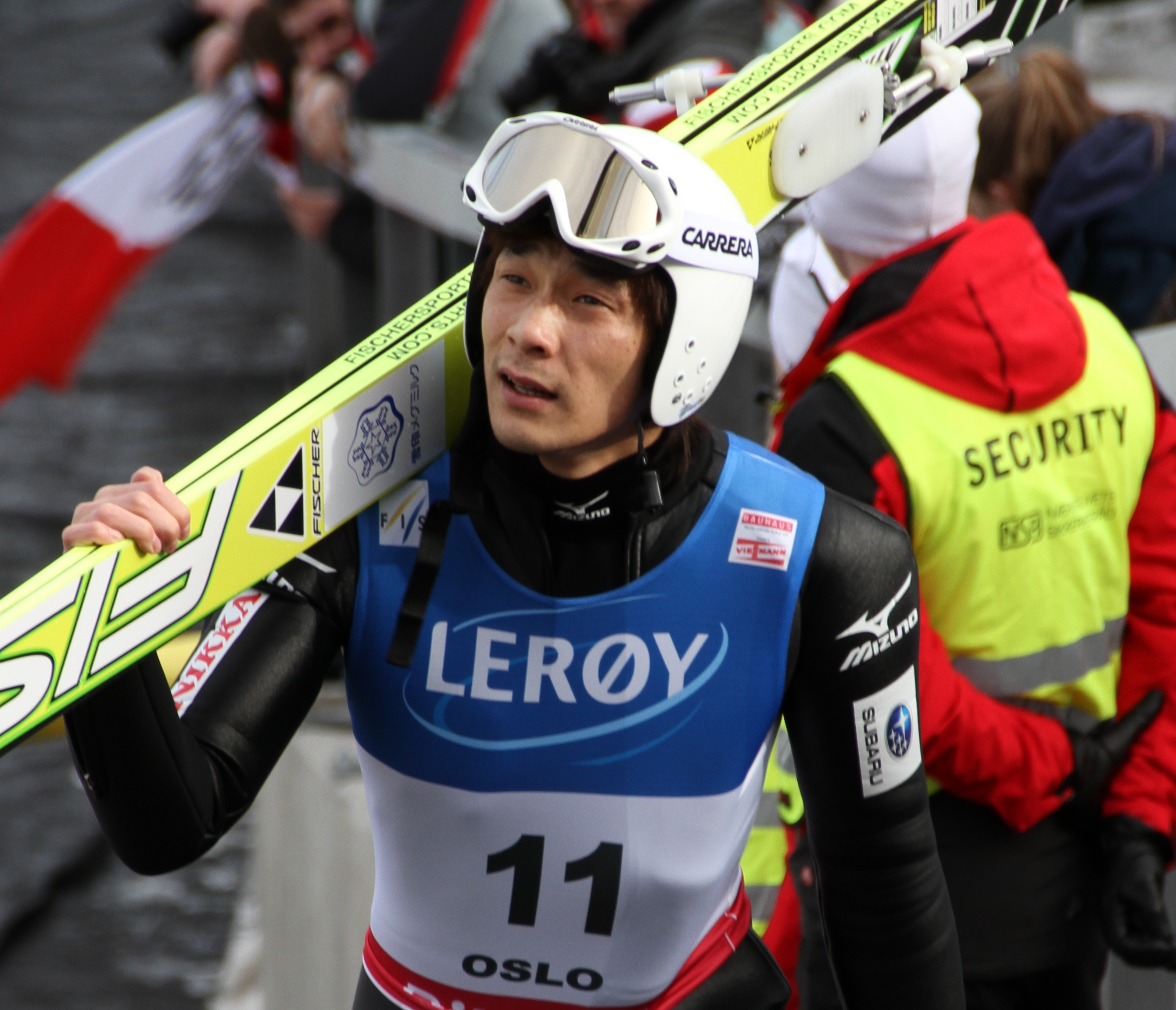

Personal information
- Born: 8 August 1982 (age 43) Sapporo, Hokkaido, Japan

Sport
- Sport: Skiing
- Club: Snow Brand Ski Team

World Cup career
- Seasons: 1999–2002, 2008–
- Indiv. wins: 0

Yuta Watase (渡瀬 雄太, Watase Yūta; born 8 August 1982) is a Japanese ski jumper. In the World Cup he finished once among the top 10, recording an eighth place from January 2001 in Park City, Utah.

2008–2009 he made a comeback to the Japan Ski jump team in the Fis World cup.
