= Kazuya Yoshioka =

Japanese ski jumper (born 1978)

Personal information
- Full name: Kazuya Yoshioka
- Nationality: Japan
- Born: 9 September 1978 (age 48) Otaru, Hokkaido, Japan

Sport
- Sport: Skiing
- Club: Tsuchiya Home

World Cup career
- Seasons: 1995; 1997–2002; 2004–present
- Indiv. podiums: 1
- Team podiums: 5
- Team wins: 2
Medal record
Men's ski jumping
Asian Games
Gold medal – first place	2011 Astana-Almaty	Large hill

Kazuya Yoshioka (吉岡 和也, Yoshioka Kazuya; born 9 September 1978) is a Japanese ski jumper. In his long World Cup career, Yoshioka has finished twelve times among the top 10. He also has four podium finishes as well as two team victories on 30 January 1999 in Willingen, and on 19 January 2001 in Park City.

At the 2001 FIS Nordic World Ski Championships he finished 19th on the normal hill and 20th on the large hill. He placed 19th at the 1998 FIS Ski Flying World Championships.
