= Konstantin Sokolenko =

Kazakhstani Nordic combined skier

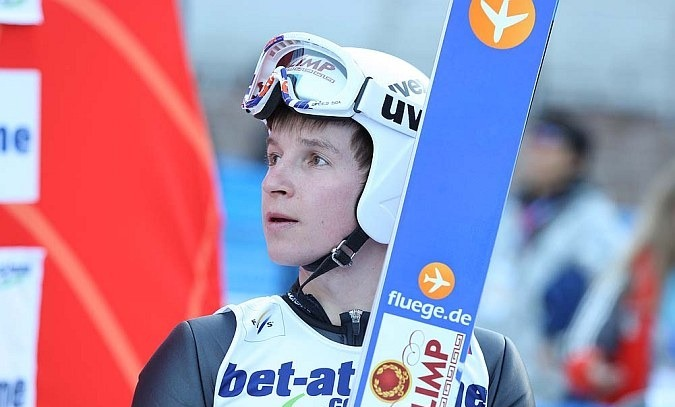

Personal information
- Born: September 11, 1987 (age 38) Soviet Union

Sport
- Sport: Skiing
- Club: ZSKA Almaty

World Cup career
- Seasons: 2006-
- Updated on 20 January 2009

Konstantin Sokolenko (born 9 November 1987 in Soviet Union) is a Kazakhstani Nordic combined skier.

== Career ==
Sokolenko is the most qualified Nordic combined skier in Kazakhstan. Sokolenko's best performance was when he received the 28th place in a summer World Cup competition in Kandersteg, Switzerland. He competed in the World Championships in Sapporo 2007 and took 42nd place in the Sprint competition. Impressive because Sokolenko took a bad fall one day earlier.

Sokolenko also took the 48th place in 15 km Gundersen and received the 10th place in the team competition together with the other jumpers in the Kazakhstani team, Sergey Sharabayev, Anton Kankenov, and Alexandr Gurin, who also took a dangerous crash in Sapporo.

Sokolenko competed in the Nordic Combined Continental Cup the season 2008–09 and has two times received a 16th place which was his best performance so far this winter.

In the summer of 2010, Sokolenko quit his Nordic combined career to become a ski jumper. His first results was a 4th place in Fiscup and a 13th in Continental Cup.

== Personal information ==
Sokolenko is jumping for club ZSKA Almaty. He is living in Almaty, Kazakhstan.
