= Nikolay Karpenko =

Kazakhstani ski jumper (born 1981)

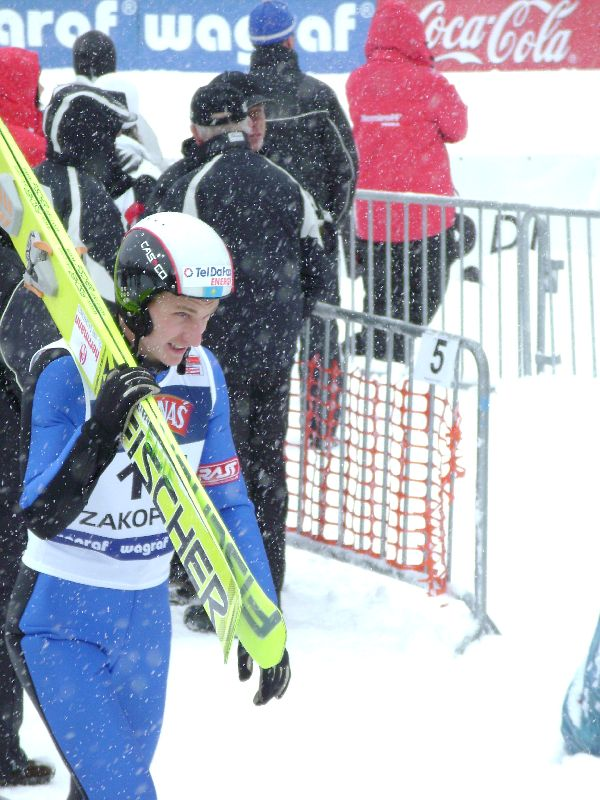

Medal record

Men's ski jumping

Representing Kazakhstan

Asian Games
Silver medal – second place	2011 Astana-Almaty	Large hill team
Bronze medal – third place	2011 Astana-Almaty	Large hill

Nikolay Karpenko (born 10 August 1981 in Almaty) is a Kazakhstani ski jumper who has been competing since 2005. Competing in two Winter Olympics, he earned his best finish of 12th in the team large hill at Turin in 2006 while earning his best individual finish was 29th in the individual normal hill event at Vancouver in four years later.

At the FIS Nordic World Ski Championships, Karpenko has finished 11th in team events three times (2005: large, normal; 2007: large) and 26th in the individual large hill (2009) events.

His best World Cup finish was eighth in a team flying hill event at Germany in 2009 while his best individual finish was 19th in an individual large hill event also in Germany in 2007.
