= Kim Hyun-ki =

South Korean ski jumper

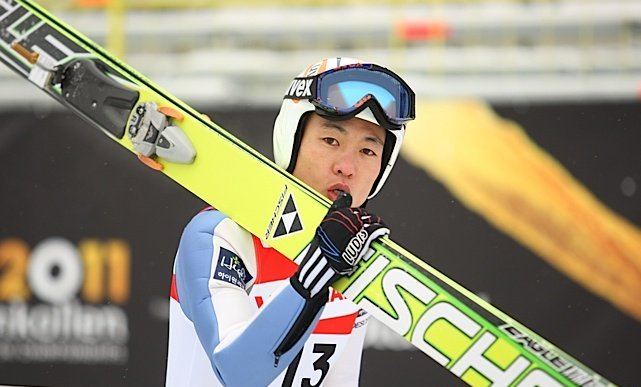

Personal information
- Nickname: Zzan Ji
- Born: February 9, 1983 (age 43) Gangneung, South Korea

Sport
- Sport: Skiing
- Club: Mu-Ju Resort

World Cup career
- Seasons: 1999–
- Indiv. podiums: 0
- Indiv. wins: 0
Medal record
Men's ski jumping
Representing South Korea
Asian Games
Gold medal – first place	2003 Aomori	Normal hill team
Bronze medal – third place	2011 Astana–Almaty	Large hill team
- Updated on 20 May 2008

- Kim Hyun-ki
- Hangul: 김현기
- Hanja: 金鉉起
- RR: Gim Hyeongi
- MR: Kim Hyŏn'gi

Kim Hyun-ki (Korean: 김현기; born February 9, 1983) is a South Korean ski jumper who has competed from 1998 to 2018.

Competing in four Winter Olympics, he earned his best finish of eighth in the team large hill event at Salt Lake City in 2002 while his best individual finish was 31st in the individual large hill event at those same games.

Kim's best finish at the FIS Nordic World Ski Championships was tenth in the team normal hill event at Oberstdorf in 2005 while his best individual finish was 38th in the individual normal hill at those same games. He finished 30th in the individual event of the FIS Ski-Flying World Championships 2006 in Kulm.

Kim's best individual World Cup finish was 21st in a large hill event in Japan in 2006. He has two individual victories in lesser events from 2009.

He holds a negative record for the highest number of fallouts in qualifications in World Cup with 118 fallouts.
