= Alexey Korolev =

Kazakhstani ski jumper (born 1987)

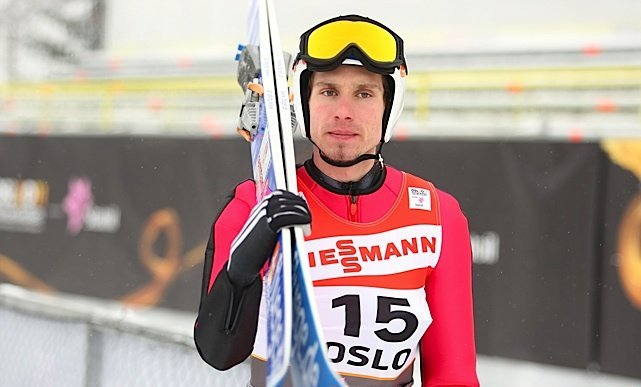
- Korolev in 2011

Personal information
- Born: 20 June 1987 (age 39) Almaty, Kazakh SSR, Soviet Union

Sport
- Sport: Skiing
Medal record
Men's ski jumping
Representing Kazakhstan
Asian Games
Silver medal – second place	2011 Astana-Almaty	Large hill team

Alexey Vladimirovich Korolev (Kazakh: Алексей Владимирович Королев; born 20 June 1987) is a Kazakhstani ski jumper who has competed since 2004. Competing in two Winter Olympics, he earned his best finish of 12th in the team large hill event at Turin in 2006 while earning his best finish of 39th in the individual large hill event at Vancouver four years later.

At the FIS Nordic World Ski Championships 2009 in Liberec, Korolov finished 12th in the team large hill and 46th in the individual normal hill event.

His best World Cup finish was eighth in the team large hill event at Germany in 2009 while his best individual finish was 29th in an individual large hill event at Germany the following year.
