= Choi Heung-chul =

South Korean ski jumper (born 1981)

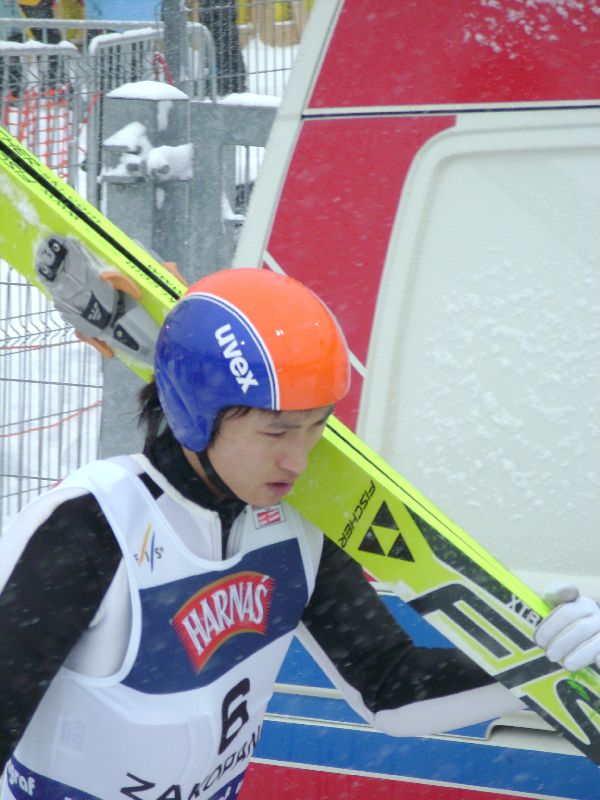
- Choi in Zakopane in 2008

Personal information
- Born: 3 December 1981 (age 44) South Korea

Sport
- Sport: Skiing
- Club: High1
Medal record
Men's ski jumping
Representing South Korea
Winter Universiade
| Gold medal – first place | 2003 Tarvisio | Normal Hill Teams |
| Gold medal – first place | 2009 Harbin | Normal Hill Teams |
| Silver medal – second place | 2001 Zakopane | Normal Hill |
| Silver medal – second place | 2001 Zakopane | Normal Hill Teams |
| Silver medal – second place | 2003 Torino | Normal Hill Teams |
| Bronze medal – third place | 2009 Harbin | Large Hill |
Asian Games
| Gold medal – first place | 2003 Aomori | Normal hill team |
| Bronze medal – third place | 2003 Aomori | Normal hill |
| Bronze medal – third place | 2011 Astana-Almaty | Large hill team |
- Updated on 28 November 2009

Choi Heung-chul (Korean: 최흥철; born December 3, 1981) is a South Korean ski jumper who has competed since 1997. Competing in six Winter Olympics, he earned his best finish of eighth in the team large hill event at Salt Lake City in 2002 and had his best individual finish of 30th in the individual normal hill event at those same games

Choi's best finishes at the FIS Nordic World Ski Championships was tenth in the team normal hill event at Oberstdorf in 2005 while his best individual finish was 24th in the individual normal hill event at Lahti four years earlier.

His best World Cup finish of eighth in the team large hill event at Japan in 2002 while his best individual finish was 15th in an individual large hill event at Finland three years earlier.
