= 2011 World Short Track Speed Skating Championships – Men's 1500 metres =

The men's 1500 metre at the 2011 World Short Track Speed Skating Championships took place 11 March at the Sheffield Arena.

== Results ==
=== Quarterfinals ===
Top 2 athletes from each heat qualified for semifinals.

Heat 1

Rank	Athlete	Country	Time	Notes
1	Charles Hamelin	Canada	2:17.644	Q
2	Jeff Simon	United States	2:17.843	Q
3	Bartosz Konopko	Poland	2:18.721	
4	Edin Brankovic	Bosnia and Herzegovina	2:20.123	
5	Peter Jelen	Slovakia	2:21.772	
6	Yauheni Ryzhou	Belarus	2:25.372	

Heat 3

Rank	Athlete	Country	Time	Notes
1	Liang Wenhao	China	2:21.262	Q
2	Lee Ho-Suk	South Korea	2:21.424	Q
3	Paul Herrmann	Germany	2:21.600	
4	Csaba Burjan	Hungary	2:22.413	
5	Jekabs Saulitis	Latvia	2:23.275	
6	Jakov Domitrek	Croatia	2:29.305	

Heat 5

Rank	Athlete	Country	Time	Notes
1	Francois Hamelin	Canada	2:29.322	Q
2	Travis Jayner	United States	2:29.856	Q
3	Bence Olah	Hungary	2:31.232	
4	Blake Skjellerup	New Zealand	2:31.995	
5	Jonathan Lopez	Spain	2:37.875	
-	Vladislav Bykanov	Israel	-	PEN

Heat 7

Rank	Athlete	Country	Time	Notes
1	Liu Xianwei	China	2:26.966	Q
2	Niels Kerstholt	Netherlands	2:27.161	Q
3	Robert Seifert	Germany	2:28.805	
4	Oleksiy Koshelenko	Ukraine	2:29.478	
5	Andrej Valach	Slovakia	3:06.624	
-	Dariusz Kulesza	Poland		PEN

Heat 9

Rank	Athlete	Country	Time	Notes
1	Noh Jin-Kyu	South Korea	2:29.315	Q
2	Yuzo Takamido	Japan	2:29.542	Q
3	Jack Whelbourne	United Kingdom	2:30.116	
4	Dmytro Poltavets	Ukraine	2:33.953	
5	Siarhei Yakushkou	Belarus	2:36.084	
6	Istvan Gal-Oravecz	Romania	2:36.812	

Heat 2

Rank	Athlete	Country	Time	Notes
1	Thibaut Fauconnet	France	2:23.588	Q
2	Jon Eley	United Kingdom	2:23.824	Q
3	Nicola Rodigari	Italy	2:23.869	
4	Pierre Boda	Australia	2:24.039	
5	Selim Tanrikulu	Turkey	2:28.614	

Heat 4

Rank	Athlete	Country	Time	Notes
1	Song Weilong	China	2:23.211	Q
2	Sjinkie Knegt	Netherlands	2:23.334	Q
3	Jeremy Masson	France	2:24.645	
4	Yang-Chun Wang	Chinese Taipei	2:26.053	
5	Kiril Pandov	Bulgaria	2:31.358	
6	Jose Ignacio Fazio	Argentina	2:34.105	

Heat 6

Rank	Athlete	Country	Time	Notes
1	Um Cheon-Ho	South Korea	2:24.230	Q
2	Ruslan Zakharov	Russia	2:24.746	Q
3	Daisuke Uemura	Japan	2:25.037	
4	Assen Pandov	Bulgaria	2:32.683	
5	Alvaro Pena	Spain	2:35.049	
-	Maxime Chataignier	France	-	PEN

Heat 8

Rank	Athlete	Country	Time	Notes
1	Olivier Jean	Canada	2:26.500	Q
2	Simon Cho	United States	2:26.812	Q
3	Edoardo Reggiani	Italy	3:04.740	
4	Liu Pan To Barton	Hong Kong	3:05.643	
-	Sergey Prankevich	Russia	-	PEN

=== Semifinals ===
Top 2 athletes from each heat qualify for the final.

Heat 1

Rank	Athlete	Country	Time	Notes
1	Noh Jin-Kyu	South Korea	2:17.807	Q
2	Jeff Simon	United States	2:17.921	Q
3	Yuzo Takamido	Japan	2:18.137	
4	Olivier Jean	Canada	2:18.575	
5	Liang Wenhao	China	2:19.457	
6	Ruslan Zakharov	Russia	2:20.951	

Heat 3

Rank	Athlete	Country	Time	Notes
1	Lee Ho-Suk	South Korea	2:20.615	Q
2	Simon Cho	United States	2:20.851	Q
3	Song Weilong	China	2:21.696	ADV
4	Francois Hamelin	Canada	2:22.690	
-	Thibaut Fauconnet	France	-	PEN
-	Niels Kerstholt	Netherlands	-	PEN

Heat 2

Rank	Athlete	Country	Time	Notes
1	Um Cheon-Ho	South Korea	2:19.737	Q
2	Charles Hamelin	Canada	2:19.753	Q
3	Liu Xianwei	China	2:19.846	
4	Sjinkie Knegt	Netherlands	2:19.935	
5	John Eley	United Kingdom	2:20.185	
6	Travis Jayner	United States	2:22.277	

=== Final ===
Rank	Athlete	Country	Time	Notes
Gold medal	Noh Jin-Kyu	South Korea	2:18.291	
Silver medal	Charles Hamelin	Canada	2:18.676	
Bronze medal	Jeff Simon	United States	2:18.725	
4	Song Weilong	China	2:19.675	
5	Simon Cho	United States	2:20.702	
6	Um Cheon-Ho	South Korea	2:22.314	
7	Lee Ho-Suk	South Korea	2:24.285	
