= 2011 World Short Track Speed Skating Championships – Men's 500 metres =

The men's 500 metre at the 2011 World Short Track Speed Skating Championships took place 12 March at the Sheffield Arena.

== Results ==
=== Preliminaries ===
Top two athletes from each heat and the next two fastest thirds qualified for heats.

Heat 1

Rank	Athlete	Country	Time	Notes
1	Song Weilong	China	43.449	Q
2	Maxime Chataignier	France	43.709	Q
3	Daisuke Uemura	Japan	44.043	
4	Pierre Boda	Australia	44.252	

Heat 3

Rank	Athlete	Country	Time	Notes
1	Charles Hamelin	Canada	42.586	Q
2	Jack Whelbourne	United Kingdom	42.689	Q
3	Vladislav Bykanov	Israel	43.922	q
4	Edin Brankovic	Bosnia and Herzegovina	45.673	

Heat 5

Rank	Athlete	Country	Time	Notes
1	Noh Jin-Kyu	South Korea	43.405	Q
2	Dariusz Kulesza	Poland	44.042	Q
3	Bence Olah	Hungary	44.608	
4	Edoardo Reggiani	Italy	1:02.458	

Heat 7

Rank	Athlete	Country	Time	Notes
1	Olivier Jean	Canada	43.064	Q
2	Thibaut Fauconnet	France	43.424	Q
3	Liu Pan To Barton	Hong Kong	45.554	
4	Jonathan Lopez	Spain	49.129	

Heat 9

Rank	Athlete	Country	Time	Notes
1	John Eley	United Kingdom	42.910	Q
2	Liang Wenhao	China	42.945	Q
3	Kiril Pandov	Bulgaria	44.140	
4	Selim Tanrikulu	Turkey	44.835	

Heat 11

Rank	Athlete	Country	Time	Notes
1	Simon Cho	United States	43.799	Q
2	Jeremy Masson	France	44.487	Q
3	Yang-Chun Wang	Chinese Taipei	46.572	
4	Istvan Gal-Oravecz	Romania	46.614	

Heat 13

Rank	Athlete	Country	Time	Notes
1	Nicola Rodigari	Italy	43.815	Q
2	Oleksiy Koshelenko	Ukraine	44.230	Q
3	Um Cheon-Ho	South Korea	46.261	
4	Jose Ignacio Fazio	Argentina	47.546	

Heat 2

Rank	Athlete	Country	Time	Notes
1	Francois Hamelin	Canada	43.449	Q
2	Travis Jayner	United States	43.709	Q
3	Siarhei Yakushkou	Belarus	44.043	
4	Peter Jelen	Slovakia	44.252	

Heat 4

Rank	Athlete	Country	Time	Notes
1	Bartosz Konopko	Poland	42.967	Q
2	Liu Xianwei	China	43.131	Q
3	Assen Pandov	Bulgaria	43.627	q
4	Yauheni Ryzhou	Belarus	45.313	

Heat 6

Rank	Athlete	Country	Time	Notes
1	Niels Kerstholt	Netherlands	43.854	Q
2	Yuzo Takamido	Japan	43.940	Q
3	Dmytro Poltavets	Ukraine	45.336	
4	Andrej Valach	Slovakia	45.405	

Heat 8

Rank	Athlete	Country	Time	Notes
1	Sjinkie Knegt	Netherlands	43.857	Q
2	Ruslan Zakharov	Russia	44.173	Q
3	Jekabs Saulitis	Latvia	45.207	
4	Álvaro Peña	Spain	46.320	

Heat 10

Rank	Athlete	Country	Time	Notes
1	Robert Seifert	Germany	43.070	Q
2	Jeff Simon	United States	43.117	Q
3	Sergey Prankevich	Russia	44.237	
4	Csaba Burjan	Hungary	44.756	

Heat 12

Rank	Athlete	Country	Time	Notes
1	Lee Ho-Suk	South Korea	44.157	Q
2	Paul Herrmann	Germany	44.159	Q
3	Blake Skjellerup	New Zealand	45.625	
4	Jakov Domitrek	Croatia	47.608	

=== Heats ===
Top 2 Athletes from each heat and the next 2 fastest thirds qualified for quarterfinals.

Heat 1

Rank	Athlete	Country	Time	Notes
1	Thibaut Fauconnet	France	43.384	Q
2	Bartosz Konopko	Poland	43.561	Q
3	Oleksiy Koshelenko	Ukraine	43.714	
4	Simon Cho	United States		ADV

Heat 3

Rank	Athlete	Country	Time	Notes
1	Nicola Rodigari	Italy	43.759	Q
2	Liu Xianwei	China	43.893	Q
3	Maxime Chataignier	France	44.865	
4	Jeff Simon	United States		PEN

Heat 5

Rank	Athlete	Country	Time	Notes
1	Jack Whelbourne	United Kingdom	42.806	Q
2	Olivier Jean	Canada	42.941	Q
3	Lee Ho-Suk	South Korea	43.068	q
4	Jeremy Masson	France	43.695	

Heat 7

Rank	Athlete	Country	Time	Notes
1	Robert Seifert	Germany	43.099	Q
2	Niels Kerstholt	Netherlands	43.197	Q
3	Vladislav Bykanov	Israel	44.960	
4	Noh Jin-Kyu	South Korea	1:16.644	

Heat 2

Rank	Athlete	Country	Time	Notes
1	Liang Wenhao	China	42.580	Q
2	Charles Hamelin	Canada	42.678	Q
3	Dariusz Kulesza	Poland	44.227	
4	Yuzo Takamido	Japan	44.264	

Heat 4

Rank	Athlete	Country	Time	Notes
1	Francois Hamelin	Canada	42.883	Q
2	John Eley	United Kingdom	42.949	Q
3	Paul Herrmann	Germany	43.063	q
4	Ruslan Zakharov	Russia	43.405	

Heat 6

Rank	Athlete	Country	Time	Notes
1	Travis Jayner	United States	44.029	Q
2	Song Weilong	China	44.156	Q
3	Kiril Pandov	Bulgaria	44.755	ADV
–	Sjinkie Knegt	Netherlands		PEN

=== Quarterfinals ===
Top 2 Athletes from each heat qualified for Semifinals.

Heat 1

Rank	Athlete	Country	Time	Notes
1	Liang Wenhao	China	42.237	Q
2	Simon Cho	United States	42.364	Q
3	Jack Whelbourne	United Kingdom	42.451	
4	Nicola Rodigari	Italy	42.748	

Heat 3

Rank	Athlete	Country	Time	Notes
1	Francois Hamelin	Canada	42.638	Q
2	Thibaut Fauconnet	France	42.697	Q
3	Robert Seifert	Germany	42.795	
4	Lee Ho-Suk	South Korea	42.917	

Heat 2

Rank	Athlete	Country	Time	Notes
1	Charles Hamelin	Canada	42.736	Q
2	Niels Kerstholt	Netherlands	43.320	Q
3	Paul Herrmann	Germany	44.630	
4	Liu Xianwei	China	1:01.288	ADV
–	Travis Jayner	United States		PEN

Heat 4

Rank	Athlete	Country	Time	Notes
1	Olivier Jean	Canada	42.757	Q
2	John Eley	United Kingdom	42.959	Q
3	Song Weilong	China	43.304	
4	Bartosz Konopko	Poland	43.579	
5	Kiril Pandov	Bulgaria	1:37.704	

=== Semifinals ===
Top 2 Athletes from each heat qualified for the Final.

Heat 1

Rank	Athlete	Country	Time	Notes
1	Simon Cho	United States	42.625	Q
2	Liu Xianwei	China	42.737	Q
3	John Eley	United Kingdom	1:11.002	
4	Francois Hamelin	Canada	1:13.490	

Heat 2

Rank	Athlete	Country	Time	Notes
1	Niels Kerstholt	Netherlands	43.364	Q
2	Olivier Jean	Canada	43.896	Q
3	Liang Wenhao	China	44.303	
4	Thibaut Fauconnet	France	44.516	ADV
–	Charles Hamelin	Canada		PEN

=== Final ===
Rank	Athlete	Country	Time	Notes
1st place, gold medalist(s)	Simon Cho	United States	42.307	
2nd place, silver medalist(s)	Olivier Jean	Canada	42.429	
3rd place, bronze medalist(s)	Liang Wenhao	China	42.493	
4	Liu Xianwei	China	42.523	
5	Niels Kerstholt	Netherlands	58.500	
