= 2011 World Short Track Speed Skating Championships – Men's 1000 metres =

The men's 1000 metre at the 2011 World Short Track Speed Skating Championships took place 13 March at the Sheffield Arena.

== Results ==
=== Heats ===
Top 2 Athletes from each heat qualified for quarterfinals.

Heat 1

Rank	Athlete	Country	Time	Notes
1	Olivier Jean	Canada	1:30.930	Q
2	Robert Seifert	Germany	1:31.279	Q
3	Siarhei Yakushkou	Belarus	1:35.102	
4	Andrej Valach	Slovakia	1:55.842	
–	Daisuke Uemura	Japan		PEN

Heat 3

Rank	Athlete	Country	Time	Notes
1	Noh Jin-Kyu	South Korea	1:28.553	Q
2	Nicola Rodigari	Italy	1:28.829	Q
3	Ruslan Zakharov	Russia	1:29.187	
4	Vladislav Bykanov	Israel	1:29.574	
5	Álvaro Peña	Spain	1:36.827	

Heat 5

Rank	Athlete	Country	Time	Notes
1	Lee Ho-Suk	South Korea	1:30.067	Q
2	Niels Kerstholt	Netherlands	1:30.235	0
3	Dmytro Poltavets	Ukraine	1:31.842	
4	Wang Yang-Chun	Chinese Taipei	1:33.785	
5	Jose Ignacio Fazio	Argentina	1:36.230	

Heat 7

Rank	Athlete	Country	Time	Notes
1	Liu Xianwei	China	1:31.048	Q
2	Paul Herrmann	Germany	1:31.692	Q
3	Csaba Burjan	Hungary	1:34.023	
4	Lui Pan To Barton	Hong Kong	1:34.545	
5	Jonathan Lopez	Spain	1:42.741	

Heat 9

Rank	Athlete	Country	Time	Notes
1	Song Weilong	China	1:31.782	Q
2	Jon Eley	United Kingdom	1:31.792	Q
3	Jekabs Saulitis	Latvia	1:31.901	
4	Pierre Boda	Australia	1:33.766	
5	Jakov Domitrek	Croatia	1:37.763	

Heat 2

Rank	Athlete	Country	Time	Notes
1	Jack Whelbourne	United Kingdom	1:32.316	Q
2	Simon Cho	United States	1:32.402	Q
3	Sjinkie Knegt	Netherlands	1:32.428	
4	Edoardo Reggiani	Italy	1:33.377	
–	Selim Tanrikulu	Turkey		PEN

Heat 4

Rank	Athlete	Country	Time	Notes
1	Liang Wenhao	China	1:31.630	Q
2	Travis Jayner	United States	1:31.748	Q
3	Edin Brankovic	Bosnia and Herzegovina	1:32.612	
4	Oleksiy Koshelenko	Ukraine	1:33.171	
5	Yauheni Ryzhou	Belarus	1:35.047	

Heat 6

Rank	Athlete	Country	Time	Notes
1	Charles Hamelin	Canada	1:31.336	Q
2	Yuzo Takamido	Japan	1:31.359	Q
3	Sergey Prankevich	Russia	1:31.956	
4	Jeremy Masson	France	1:32.151	
5	Dariusz Kulesza	Poland	1:32.817	

Heat 8

Rank	Athlete	Country	Time	Notes
1	François Hamelin	Canada	1:32.457	Q
2	Um Cheon-Ho	South Korea	1:32.568	Q
3	Blake Skjellerup	New Zealand	1:33.450	
4	Kiril Pandov	Bulgaria	1:33.54	
5	Istvan Gal-Oravecz	Romania	1:34.933	

Heat 10

Rank	Athlete	Country	Time	Notes
1	Jeff Simon	United States	1:33.401	Q
2	Maxime Chataignier	France	1:33.454	Q
3	Bartosz Konopko	Poland	1:33.531	
4	Peter Jelen	Slovakia	1:34.794	
5	Bence Olah	Hungary	1:35.572	

=== Quarterfinals ===
Top 2 Athletes from each heat qualified for Semifinals.

Heat 1

Rank	Athlete	Country	Time	Notes
1	Charles Hamelin	Canada	1:29.925	Q
2	Liang Wenhao	China	1:30.092	Q
3	Travis Jayner	United States	1:30.303	
4	Lee Ho-Suk	South Korea	1:31.837	
5	Jon Eley	United Kingdom	1:35.105	

Heat 3

Rank	Athlete	Country	Time	Notes
1	Noh Jin-Kyu	South Korea	1:28.860	Q
2	François Hamelin	Canada	1:29.604	Q
3	Nicola Rodigari	Italy	1:29.679	
4	Paul Herrmann	Germany	1:29.683	
–	Liu Xianwei	China		PEN

Heat 2

Rank	Athlete	Country	Time	Notes
1	Song Weilong	China	1:29.639	Q
2	Niels Kerstholt	Netherlands	1:30.079	Q
3	Robert Seifert	Germany	1:30.273	
4	Simon Cho	United States	1:31.394	
–	Yuzo Takamido	Japan		PEN

Heat 4

Rank	Athlete	Country	Time	Notes
1	Olivier Jean	Canada	1:30.471	Q
2	Maxime Chataignier	France	1:30.568	Q
3	Um Cheon-Ho	South Korea	1:33.171	
4	Jack Whelbourne	United Kingdom	1:34.517	
5	Jeff Simon	United States	2:01.505	ADV

=== Semifinals ===
Top 2 Athletes from each heat qualified for the Final.

Heat 1

Rank	Athlete	Country	Time	Notes
1	Charles Hamelin	Canada	1:28.459	Q
2	Liang Wenhao	China	1:28.593	Q
3	Jeff Simon	United States	1:28.706	
4	Niels Kerstholt	Netherlands	1:28.838	

Heat 2

Rank	Athlete	Country	Time	Notes
1	Noh Jin-Kyu	South Korea	1:27.406	Q
2	François Hamelin	Canada	1:27.611	Q
3	Maxime Chataignier	France	1:27.758	
4	Olivier Jean	Canada	1:27.786	PEN
5	Song Weilong	China	1:27.874	

=== Final ===
Rank	Athlete	Country	Time	Notes
1st place, gold medalist(s)	Noh Jin-Kyu	South Korea	1:28.552	
2nd place, silver medalist(s)	Charles Hamelin	Canada	1:28.663	
3rd place, bronze medalist(s)	Liang Wenhao	China	1:29.203	
4	François Hamelin	Canada	1:29.459	
