= 2011 World Short Track Speed Skating Championships – Men's 3000 metres =

Speed skating competition

The men's 3000 metre at the 2011 World Short Track Speed Skating Championships took place 13 March at the Sheffield Arena.

== Results ==
=== Final ===
Rank	Athlete	Country	Time	Notes
Gold medal	Noh Jin-Kyu	South Korea	4:51.638	
Silver medal	Liang Wenhao	China	4:51.877	
Bronze medal	Jeff Simon	United States	4:52.181	
4	Charles Hamelin	Canada	4:52.406	
5	Liu Xianwei	China	4:53.698	
6	François Hamelin	Canada	4:54.485	
7	Olivier Jean	Canada	4:55.198	
8	Song Weilong	China	5:15.131	
9	Simon Cho	United States	6:02.914	
