= Short-track speed skating at the 2010 Winter Olympics =

Short Track Speed Skating at the XXI Olympic Winter Games
- Venue: Pacific Coliseum
- Dates: 13–26 February 2010
- No. of events: 8
- Competitors: 109 from 23 nations

Short track speed skating at the Vancouver 2010 Olympics was held at the Pacific Coliseum, Vancouver, British Columbia on 13–26 February 2010.

China dominated the competition, sweeping the women's events - winning gold in the 500 m, 1,000 m 1,500 m and 3000 m relay. Wang Meng won three gold medals, becoming the most accomplished female short track speed skater in Olympic history. Apolo Ohno became the most decorated Winter Olympian in United States history, with eight medals.

Haralds Silovs of Latvia became the first athlete in Olympic history to participate in both short track (1500m) and long track (5000m) speed skating, and the first to compete in two different disciplines on the same day. He competed in the 5000m and then raced across town to the 1500m event.

The final of the women's 3000 metres relay event was controversially won by the Chinese team, which set a new world record. The South Korean team initially finished first but was disqualified due to illegal contact which was deemed to have impeded a Chinese skater. Australian referee James Hewish subsequently received abusing and threatening emails including personal death threats from angry South Korean fans.

== Competition schedule ==
All times are Pacific Standard Time (UTC-8).

Day	Date	Start	Finish	Event	Phase
Day 2	Saturday, 2010-02-13	17:00	19:30	500 m women	Heats
Day 2	Saturday, 2010-02-13	17:00	19:30	3,000 m relay women	Heats
Day 2	Saturday, 2010-02-13	17:00	19:30	1,500 m men	Final
Day 6	Wednesday 2010-02-17	17:00	19:15	1,000 m men	Heats
Day 6	Wednesday 2010-02-17	17:00	19:15	5,000 m relay men	Heats
Day 6	Wednesday 2010-02-17	17:00	19:15	500 m women	Final
Day 9	Saturday 2010-02-20	17:45	20:15	1,500 m women	Final
Day 9	Saturday 2010-02-20	17:45	20:15	1,000 m men	Final
Day 13	Wednesday 2010-02-24	17:00	18:45	1,000 m women	Heats
Day 13	Wednesday 2010-02-24	17:00	18:45	500 m men	Heats
Day 13	Wednesday 2010-02-24	17:00	18:45	3,000 m relay women	Final
Day 15	Friday 2010-02-26	18:00	20:15	500 m men	Final
Day 15	Friday 2010-02-26	18:00	20:15	1,000 m women	Final
Day 15	Friday 2010-02-26	18:00	20:15	5,000 m relay men	Final

== Medal summary ==
=== Medal table ===
Rank	Nation	Gold	Silver	Bronze	Total
1	China	4	0	0	4
2	South Korea	2	4	2	8
3	Canada	2	2	1	5
4	United States	0	2	4	6
5	Italy	0	0	1	1
Totals (5 entries)		8	8	8	24

=== Men's events ===
Event	Gold		Silver		Bronze	
500 metres	Charles Hamelin; Canada	40.981	Sung Si-bak; South Korea	41.340	François-Louis Tremblay; Canada	46.366
1000 metres	Lee Jung-su; South Korea	1:23.747 OR	Lee Ho-suk; South Korea	1:23.801	Apolo Ohno; United States	1:24.128
1500 metres	Lee Jung-su; South Korea	2:17.611	Apolo Ohno; United States	2:17.976	J. R. Celski; United States	2:18.053
5000 metre relay	Canada; Charles Hamelin; François Hamelin; Olivier Jean; François-Louis Tremblay; Guillaume Bastille	6:44.224	South Korea; Kwak Yoon-gy; Lee Ho-suk; Lee Jung-su; Sung Si-bak; Kim Seoung-il	6:44.446	United States; J. R. Celski; Travis Jayner; Jordan Malone; Apolo Ohno; Simon Cho	6:44.498

=== Women's events ===
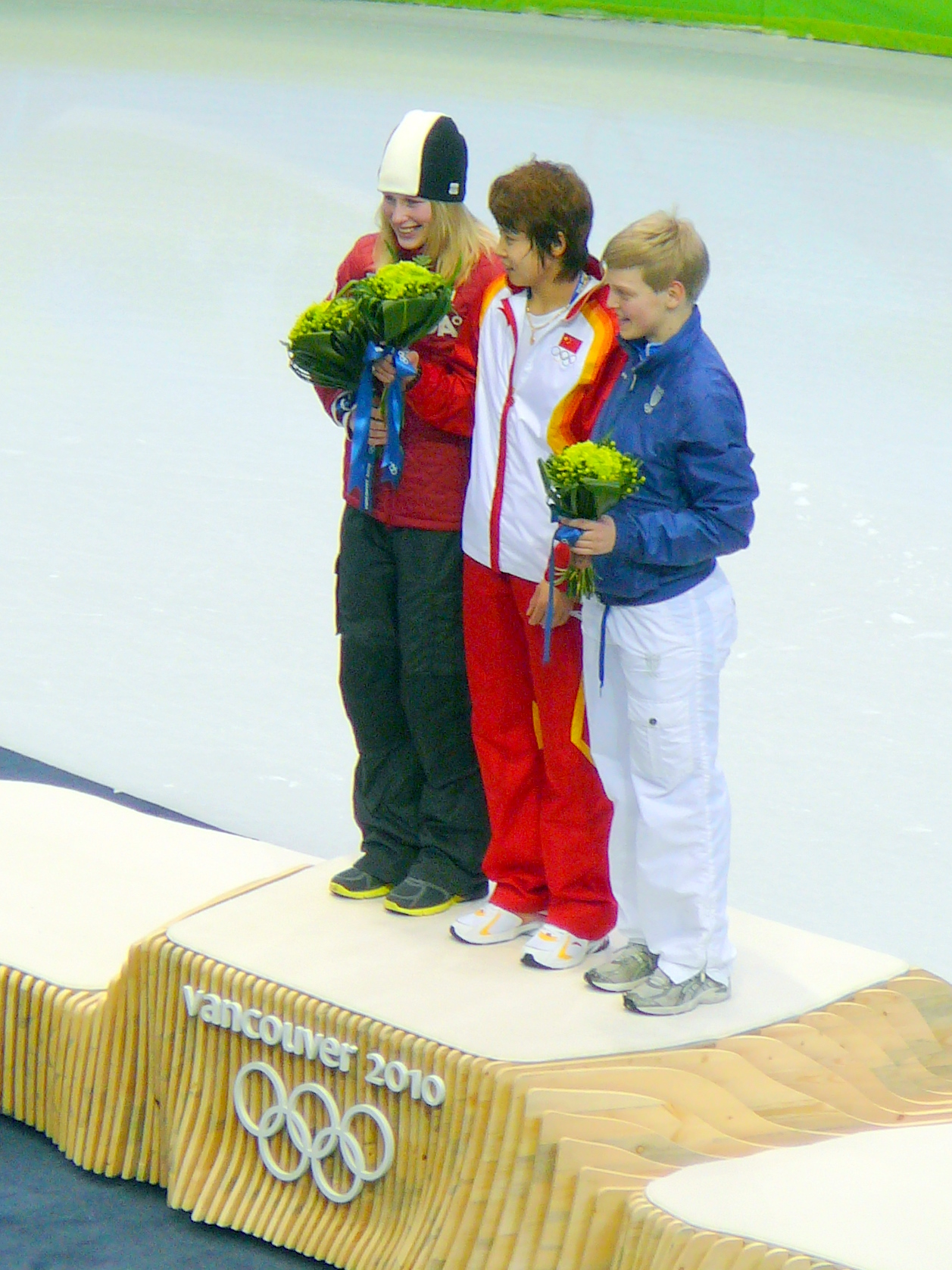
The presentation of the medals in the 500 metres women's events. From left: Marianne St-Gelais, Wang Meng and Arianna Fontana.

Event	Gold		Silver		Bronze	
500 metres	Wang Meng; China	43.048	Marianne St-Gelais; Canada	43.707	Arianna Fontana; Italy	43.804
1000 metres	Wang Meng; China	1:29.213	Katherine Reutter; United States	1:29.324	Park Seung-hi; South Korea	1:29.379
1500 metres	Zhou Yang; China	2:16.993 OR	Lee Eun-byul; South Korea	2:17.849	Park Seung-hi; South Korea	2:17.927
3000 metre relay	China; Sun Linlin; Wang Meng; Zhang Hui; Zhou Yang	4:06.610 WR	Canada; Jessica Gregg; Kalyna Roberge; Marianne St-Gelais; Tania Vicent	4:09.137	United States; Allison Baver; Alyson Dudek; Lana Gehring; Katherine Reutter; Kimberly Derrick	4:14.081

== Records ==
Event	Date	Round	Name	Nation	Time	OR	WR
Men's 1500 m	February 13	Heat 3	Lee Jung-su	South Korea	2:12.280	OR	
Women's 500 m	February 13	Heat 3	Wang Meng	China	43.926	OR	
Men's 1500 m	February 13	Semifinal 1	Lee Jung-su	South Korea	2:10.949	OR	
Women's 3000 m relay	February 13	Semifinal 2	Sun Linlin; Wang Meng; Zhang Hui; Zhou Yang	China	4:08.797	OR	
Women's 500 m	February 17	Quarterfinal 2	Wang Meng	China	43.284	OR	
Men's 1000 m	February 17	Heat 3	Sung Si-bak	South Korea	1:24.245	OR	
Women's 500 m	February 17	Semifinal 2	Wang Meng	China	42.985	OR	

== Participating nations ==
The quotas were announced on November 23, 2009.

Nations	Men's 500m	Men's 1000m	Men's 1500m	Men's relay	Women's 500m	Women's 1000m	Women's 1500m	Women's relay	Athletes
Australia	0	1	0		1	1	1		2
Austria	0	0	0		0	1	1		1
Belgium	1	1	1		0	0	0		1
Bulgaria	0	1	0		2	1	2		3
Canada	3	2	3	X	3	3	3	X	10
China	3	3	3	X	3	3	3	X	10
Czech Republic	0	0	0		1	1	1		1
France	1	2	3	X	2	1	1		7
Germany	2	2	3	X	1	1	1		6
Great Britain	2	2	2	X	2	1	1		7
Hong Kong	0	0	0		1	1	1		1
Hungary	2	1	2		1	2	3	X	7
Italy	3	3	3	X	3	2	3	X	10
Japan	2	2	3		2	3	3	X	8
Kazakhstan	1	1	0		0	0	0		1
Latvia	1	1	1		0	0	0		1
Netherlands	2	1	2		3	3	0	X	7
New Zealand	1	1	1		0	0	0		1
Poland	0	0	1		1	1	2		3
Romania	0	0	0		0	0	1		1
Russia	2	2	2		1	2	3		5
South Korea	3	3	3	X	3	2	3	X	10
United States	3	3	3	X	2	3	3	X	10
Total: 23 NOCs	32	32	36	8	32	32	36	8	113
