= Short-track speed skating at the 2010 Winter Olympics – Men's 1500 metres =

Men's 1500 metres at the XXI Olympic Winter Games
- Venue: Pacific Coliseum
- Dates: February 13, 2010
- Competitors: 36 from 16 nations
- Winning time: 2:17.611

Medalists
1st place, gold medalist(s)		Lee Jung-su	South Korea
2nd place, silver medalist(s)		Apolo Anton Ohno	United States
3rd place, bronze medalist(s)		J. R. Celski	United States

The men's 1500 metres in short track speed skating at the 2010 Winter Olympics took place on February 13 at the Pacific Coliseum. Heats took place at 5:00 PM PST, while the semifinals took place at 6:18 PM PST and the final event one hour later at 7:18 PM PST.

== Preview ==
Going into the competition, speculation about possible winners focused on the strong South Korean contingent and on American skater Apolo Ohno. The South Korean team dominated short track speed skating at the 2006 Winter Olympics, winning six gold, three silver, and two bronze medals in the eight events. Their team at the 2010 games also included a number of skaters who were reigning world champions. Ohno received significant media attention both because of previous successes at the 2002 Winter Olympics and 2006 Games and because he was in a position to break two records, the most medals won by a short track speed skater, and the most medals won by any winter Olympian from the United States.

== Qualifying heats ==
Following the semifinal round, seven skaters qualified for the final medal round: Lee Jung-su, Lee Ho-suk and Sung Si-bak of South Korea, Apolo Ohno and J. R. Celski of the United States, Liang Wenhao of China, and Olivier Jean of Canada. Jean actually placed seventh in his semifinal heat, but advanced to the medal race after judges ruled that he had been interfered with during the race.

== Final heat and results ==
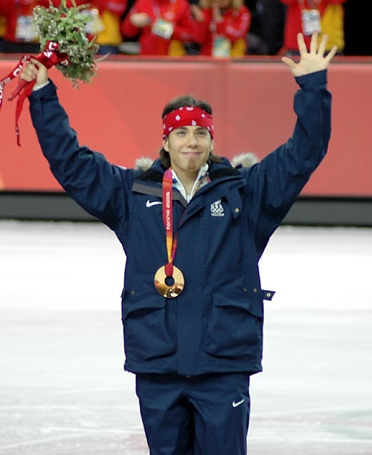
Apolo Ohno, who became the most medaled short track speed skater in Olympic history after winning the silver in the men's 1500 m race in Vancouver.

The South Korean skaters and Ohno jostled for the lead during much of the race, switching lead positions multiple times. Entering the final lap, the three South Koreans had passed Ohno and were in a position to sweep the medals in the event. However, at the entrance of the last corner on the final lap, Lee Ho-suk made a last-minute daring inside pass on Sung Si-bak, only to have his blade collide with Si-bak to cause both skaters to fall and slam into the barriers. This allowed Ohno and his fellow American skater J. R. Celski to move into second and third positions behind the eventual winner, Lee Jung-su. Lee Ho-suk was later disqualified by judges for causing the crash, and Sung Si-bak took fifth place.

Following the race, gold medalist Lee Jung-su told the media that he did not feel good about his win because of his teammates' misfortune. He credited his win to a decision to start the race in the front of the pack, which was not his usual technique. With his second-place finish and his sixth medal, Ohno became the most medaled short track speed skater in Olympic history, and tied Bonnie Blair's record as the most medaled American winter Olympian. Celski, who was skating after recovering from an accident the previous fall in which a skate's blade had sliced into his leg, earned his first medal.

Haralds Silovs became the first athlete in Olympic history to participate in both short track and long track (5000 m) speed skating, and the first to compete in two different disciplines on the same day. He competed in the 5000 m and then raced across town to the 1500 m event.

== Results ==
=== Heats ===
Rank	Heat	Name	Country	Time	Notes
1	1	Olivier Jean	Canada	2:14.279	Q
2	1	Lee Ho-suk	South Korea	2:14.324	Q
3	1	Liu Xianwei	China	2:14.354	Q
4	1	Tyson Heung	Germany	2:14.461	
5	1	Blake Skjellerup	New Zealand	2:14.730	
6	1	Ruslan Zakharov	Russia	2:14.929	
1	2	Liang Wenhao	China	2:16.152	Q
2	2	Charles Hamelin	Canada	2:16.153	Q
3	2	Sebastian Praus	Germany	2:17.058	Q
4	2	Nicolas Bean	Italy	2:17.089	
5	2	Jumpei Yoshizawa	Japan	2:30.701	ADV
–	2	Jordan Malone	United States		DSQ
1	3	Lee Jung-su	South Korea	2:12.380	Q
2	3	J. R. Celski	United States	2:12.460	Q
3	3	Nicola Rodigari	Italy	2:12.609	Q
4	3	Benjamin Macé	France	2:12.875	
5	3	Yuzo Takamido	Japan	2:15.402	
6	3	Paul Herrmann	Germany	2:16.782	
1	4	Yuri Confortola	Italy	2:14.584	Q
2	4	Sjinkie Knegt	Netherlands	2:14.862	Q
3	4	Jack Whelbourne	Great Britain	2:14.972	Q
4	4	Semion Elistratov	Russia	2:15.455	
5	4	Viktor Knoch	Hungary	2:16.826	
6	4	Song Weilong	China	2:20.095	
1	5	Apolo Anton Ohno	United States	2:17.653	Q
2	5	Pieter Gysel	Belgium	2:18.560	Q
3	5	Peter Darazs	Hungary	2:18.827	Q
4	5	Jakub Jaworski	Poland	2:19.163	
5	5	Jean Charles Mattei	France	2:33.989	ADV
–	5	Guillaume Bastille	Canada		DSQ
1	6	Sung Si-bak	South Korea	2:14.836	Q
2	6	Haralds Silovs	Latvia	2:14.900	Q
3	6	Takahiro Fujimoto	Japan	2:16.155	Q
4	6	Anthony Douglas	Great Britain	2:16.622	
5	6	Niels Kerstholt	Netherlands	2:46.222	ADV
–	6	Maxime Chataignier	France		DSQ

=== Semifinals ===
Rank	Heat	Name	Country	Time	Notes
1	1	Lee Jung-su	South Korea	2:10.949	QA, OR
2	1	Apolo Ohno	United States	2:11.072	QA
3	1	Charles Hamelin	Canada	2:11.225	QB
4	1	Nicola Rodigari	Italy	2:11.402	QB
5	1	Sjinkie Knegt	Netherlands	2:13.870	
6	1	Jumpei Yoshizawa	Japan	2:15.129	
7	1	Peter Darazs	Hungary	2:18.349	
1	2	Lee Ho-suk	South Korea	2:14.833	QA
2	2	Liang Wenhao	China	2:15.453	QA
3	2	Sebastian Praus	Germany	2:16.240	QB
4	2	Pieter Gysel	Belgium	2:16.249	QB
5	2	Jack Whelbourne	Great Britain	2:17.156	
6	2	Olivier Jean	Canada	2:32.358	ADV
7	2	Jean Charles Mattei	France	2:36.291	
1	3	Sung Si-bak	South Korea	2:13.585	QA
2	3	J. R. Celski	United States	2:13.606	QA
3	3	Yuri Confortola	Italy	2:13.645	QB
4	3	Haralds Silovs	Latvia	2:14.009	QB
5	3	Liu Xianwei	China	2:14.500	
6	3	Takahiro Fujimoto	Japan	2:15.984	
7	3	Niels Kerstholt	Netherlands	2:16.352	

=== Finals ===
==== Final B (classification round) ====
Rank	Name	Country	Time	Notes
7	Charles Hamelin	Canada	2:18.243	
8	Nicola Rodigari	Italy	2:18.422	
9	Pieter Gysel	Belgium	2:18.773	
10	Haralds Silovs	Latvia	2:19.435	
11	Sebastian Praus	Germany	2:20.374	
–	Yuri Confortola	Italy		DSQ

==== Final A (medal round) ====
Rank	Name	Country	Time	Notes
1st place, gold medalist(s)	Lee Jung-su	South Korea	2:17.611	
2nd place, silver medalist(s)	Apolo Anton Ohno	United States	2:17.976	
3rd place, bronze medalist(s)	J. R. Celski	United States	2:18.053	
4	Olivier Jean	Canada	2:18.806	
5	Sung Si-bak	South Korea	2:45.010	
6	Liang Wenhao	China	2:48.192	
–	Lee Ho-suk	South Korea		DSQ
