= 2010 World Short Track Speed Skating Team Championships =

Championship

- Location: Bormio, Italy
- Start date: 27 March 2010
- End date: 28 March 2010
- Competitors: 70 from 9 nations

The 2010 World Short Track Speed Skating Team Championships was the 20th edition of the World Short Track Speed Skating Team Championships, which took place on 27-28 March 2010 in Bormio, Italy.

== Medal winners ==
Event	Gold	Silver	Bronze
Men	South Korea; Lee Jung-su; Kim Seoung-il; Lee Ho-suk; Kwak Yoon-gy	Canada; François-Louis Tremblay; Guillaume Bastille; Charles Hamelin; Olivier Jean; François Hamelin	China; Wang Hong Yang; Han Jialiang; Liang Wenhao; Ma Yunfeng; Liu Xianwei
Women	South Korea; Kim Min-jung; Lee Eun-byul; Park Seung-hi; Cho Ha-ri	Canada; Kalyna Roberge; Tania Vicent; Jessica Gregg; Marianne St-Gelais; Valérie Maltais	Italy; Martina Valcepina; Elena Viviani; Katia Zini; Cecilia Maffei; Lucia Peretti

== Results ==
=== Men ===
Rank	Nation	Total
1st place, gold medalist(s)	South Korea	38
2nd place, silver medalist(s)	Canada	36
3rd place, bronze medalist(s)	China	24
4	Italy	21
5	Germany	FB
6	France	FB
7	Japan	FB
8	United Kingdom	FB

=== Women ===
Rank	Nation	Total
1st place, gold medalist(s)	South Korea	45
2nd place, silver medalist(s)	Canada	35
3rd place, bronze medalist(s)	Italy	21
4	Japan	19
5	Hungary	FB
6	United Kingdom	FB
7	Germany	FB
