= 2011 World Short Track Speed Skating Team Championships =

- Location: Warsaw, Poland
- Start date: 19 March 2011
- End date: 20 March 2011
- Competitors: 73 from 9 nations

The 2011 World Short Track Speed Skating Team Championships was the 21st edition of the World Short Track Speed Skating Team Championships, which took place on 19-20 March 2011 in Warsaw, Poland. Considering the experience gained over the past seasons and the evidence of insufficient interest from participating Members and in line with ISU Rule 127 paragraph 3.b), the ISU Council decided to suspend the allotment of the ISU World Short Track Speed Skating Team Championships effective as of the season 2011/2012 (2012 Championships).

== Medal winners ==
Event	Gold	Silver	Bronze
Men	South Korea; Noh Jin-kyu; Kim Byeong-jun; Lee Ho-suk; Um Cheon-ho; Kim Cheol-min	China; Gong Qiuwen; Yang Jin; Liang Wenhao; Song Weilong; Liu Xianwei	Canada; Guillaume Blais-Dufour; Michael Gilday; Charles Hamelin; Olivier Jean; François Hamelin
Women	South Korea; Kim Dam-min; Hwang Hyun-sun; Park Seung-hi; Cho Ha-ri	China; Li Jianrou; Xiao Han; Liu Qiuhong; Fan Kexin	United States; Katherine Reutter; Alyson Dudek; Lana Gehring; Jessica Smith

== Results ==
=== Men ===
Rank	Nation	Total
1st place, gold medalist(s)	South Korea	38
2nd place, silver medalist(s)	China	35
3rd place, bronze medalist(s)	Canada	28
4	Japan	18
5	United States	FB
6	Russia	FB
7	Poland	FB
8	Turkey	FB

=== Women ===
Rank	Nation	Total
1st place, gold medalist(s)	South Korea	35
2nd place, silver medalist(s)	China	34
3rd place, bronze medalist(s)	United States	29
4	Canada	22
5	Italy	FB
6	Japan	FB
7	Russia	FB
8	Poland	FB
