= Junpei =

== Chinese given name ==
In Chinese, Junpei is a name composed of two Chinese characters, where jun could be 君, 军, 俊, 骏, 峻, 筠, 珺, 均, 郡, 钧, 竣, 浚, 麇 or 隽, while pei could be 沛, 佩, 培, 裴, 霈, 旆 or 珮. Given a Chinese given name Junpei, it is usually difficult to tell whether it is a masculine or feminine given name. For example, 军佩 is more like a masculine given name, while 珺珮 is more like a feminine given name.

== Japanese given name ==
In Japanese, Junpei or Jumpei (written: 淳平, 純平, 順平, 隼平 or 潤平) is a masculine given name. Notable people with the name include:

- Junpei Fujita (藤田 淳平), Japanese music arranger and composer
- Junpei Hayakawa (早川 隼平,; born 2005), Japanese footballer
- Junpei Ide (井出 隼平; born 1991), Japanese shogi player
- Jumpei Kusukami (楠神 順平,; born 1987), Japanese footballer
- Junpei Mizobata (溝端 淳平; born 1989), Japanese actor
- Junpei Morishita (森下 純平; born 1990), Japanese judoka
- Junpei Satoh (佐藤 淳平; born 1956), Japanese painter
- Junpei Shinoda (篠田 純平; born 1985), Japanese baseball player
- Jumpei Takaki (高木 純平; born 1982), Japanese footballer
- Junpei Takiguchi (滝口 順平; 1931–2011), Japanese voice actor
- Junpei Yamada (山田 純平; born 1994), Japanese footballer
- Junpei Yasuda (安田 純平; born 1974), Japanese journalist
- Jumpei Yoshizawa (吉澤 純平; born 1985), Japanese speed skater

=== Fictional characters ===
- Junpei Ryuzouji, a main character in Those Who Hunt Elves
- Junpei (Megatokyo), a character from the web comic Megatokyo
- Junpei Iori (伊織 順平), a character from Shin Megami Tensei: Persona 3
- Junpei Shibayama (J.P. Shibayama in English dub), a character from Digimon Frontier
- Junpei Tenmyouji, a major character and protagonist from the video game series Zero Escape
- Junpei Hyuuga, a side character from Kuroko's Basketball
- Junpei Kōsaka, the protagonist of Nyan Koi!
- Junpei Manaka, a character from Ichigo 100%
- Junpei Yoshino, a character from Jujutsu Kaisen
