= Jeff Simon =

American short track speed skater

Personal information
- Full name: Jeffrey Simon
- Born: August 17, 1989 (age 37)
- Height: 5 ft 6 in (168 cm)
- Weight: 143 lb (65 kg)

Sport
- Country: United States
- Sport: Short track speed skating
- Club: F.A.S.T. Racing Program
Medal record
Men's short track speed skating
Representing the United States
World Championships
Bronze medal – third place	2011 Sheffield	1500 m
Bronze medal – third place	2011 Sheffield	3000 m
Bronze medal – third place	2011 Sheffield	5000 m relay

Jeffrey Simon (born August 17, 1989) is an American short track speed skater and three-time bronze medallist at the World Championships.

At the 2011 World Short Track Speed Skating Championships in Sheffield, England, Simon won three bronze medals. In his first event, Simon won a bronze medal in the men's 1500 m, finishing behind Noh Jin-Kyu and Charles Hamelin. Simon won his second bronze in the men's 3000 m, finishing behind Noh Jin-Kyu and Liang Wenhao. In his last event, the men's 5000 m relay, Simon won the bronze with Kyle Carr, Travis Jayner, and Anthony Lobello. Simon also competed in the men's 500 and 1000 m but did not advance to the finals in either event.
