= 2017 World Single Distances Speed Skating Championships – Men's mass start =

Men's mass start at the 2017 World Single Distances Speed Skating Championships
- Venue: Gangneung Oval
- Location: Gangneung, South Korea
- Dates: 12 February
- Competitors: 24 from 16 nations
- Winning points: 60

Medalists
gold medal	Joey Mantia	United States
silver medal	Alexis Contin	France
bronze medal	Olivier Jean	Canada

The men's mass start competition at the 2017 World Single Distances Speed Skating Championships was held on 12 February 2017.

== Results ==
The race was started at 20:33.

Rank	Name	Country	Time	Points
1st place, gold medalist(s)	Joey Mantia	United States	7:40.16	60
2nd place, silver medalist(s)	Alexis Contin	France	7:41.11	41
3rd place, bronze medalist(s)	Olivier Jean	Canada	7:47.62	27
4	Vitaly Mikhailov	Belarus	7:47.75	8
5	Armin Hager	Austria	7:52.00	8
6	Roland Cieślak	Poland	7:50.64	0
7	Gary Hekman	Netherlands	7:50.76	0
8	Bart Swings	Belgium	7:51.02	0
9	Shane Williamson	Japan	7:51.49	0
10	Fabio Francolini	Italy	7:51.53	0
11	Joo Hyong-jun	South Korea	7:51.62	0
12	K. C. Boutiette	United States	7:52.21	0
13	Viktor Hald Thorup	Denmark	7:53.30	0
14	Jorrit Bergsma	Netherlands	7:53.53	0
15	Ryosuke Tsuchiya	Japan	7:54.51	0
16	Livio Wenger	Switzerland	7:56.42	0
17	Linus Heidegger	Austria	7:57.06	0
18	Dmitry Babenko	Kazakhstan	7:57.93	0
19	Jordan Belchos	Canada	7:57.96	0
20	Andrea Giovannini	Italy	7:58.69	0
21	Kim Min-seok	South Korea	8:04.35	0
22	Peter Michael	New Zealand	8:14.42	0
23	Reyon Kay	New Zealand	7:49.76	0
24	Danila Semerikov	Russia	7:27.15	0
