= Assen Pandov =

Bulgarian speed skater

Personal information
- Born: June 15, 1984 (age 42) Sofia, Bulgaria
- Height: 5 ft 9 in (1.75 m)
- Weight: 148 lb (67 kg)

Sport
- Country: Bulgaria
- Sport: Short track speed skating

Achievements and titles
- Highest world ranking: 16 (500m)

Assen Pandov (Bulgarian: Асен Пандов; born June 15, 1984, in Sofia) is a Bulgarian short track speed skater.

Pandov competed at the 2002 and 2010 Winter Olympics for Bulgaria. In 2002, he finished 4th in his heat of the 500 metres, failing to advance. In 2010, he placed 4th in his opening race of the 1000 metres, again failing to advance. In both races, he placed 31st overall.

As of 2013, Pandov's best performance at the World Championships came in 2010, as part of the Bulgarian 5000m relay team, when he placed 7th. His best individual finish is 16th, in the 500m in 2011.

As of 2013, Pandov has not finished on the podium on the ISU Short Track Speed Skating World Cup. His top World Cup ranking is 16th, in the 500 metres in 2005–06.
