= TeamNL =

Dutch sports organisation

- Region served: the Netherlands
- Parent organisation: NOC*NSF
- Website: teamnl.org

TeamNL is an umbrella organisation of Dutch sports associations. An evaluation after the 2016 Summer Olympics in Rio de Janeiro, Brazil, led to some organisational reforms within NOC*NSF. Former chef de mission Maurits Hendriks wanted to generate more revenue with TeamNL, in addition to income from games of chance and investments by the Ministry of Health, Welfare and Sport. At the 2016 Olympics, the name TeamNL was already used, but since the 2020 Summer Olympics it is more directly linked to the larger project of NOC*NSF. It is used as the general name for the participating Dutch athletic teams from the various associations during major sports events. The affiliated associations are:

Sport	Association (English name)	Association (Dutch name)
Athletics	Royal Dutch Athletics Union	Koninklijke Nederlandse Atletiek Unie (Atletiekunie)
Badminton	Badminton Netherlands	Badminton Nederland
Baseball and Softball	Royal Dutch Baseball and Softball Association	Koninklijke Nederlandse Baseball en Softball Bond (KNBSB)
Basketball	Dutch Basketball Association	Nederlandse Basketball Bond (NBB)
Billiards	Royal Dutch Billiards Association	Koninklijke Nederlandse Biljart Bond (KNBB)
Boxing	Dutch Boxing Association	Nederlandse Boks Bond (NBB)
Bridge	Dutch Bridge Association	Nederlandse Bridge Bond (NBB)
Curling	Dutch Curling Association	Nederlandse Curling Bond (NCB)
Drafts	Royal Dutch Drafts Association	Koninklijke Nederlandse Dam Bond (KNDB)
Disabled Sports	Disabled Sports Netherlands	Gehandicaptensport Nederland (NebasNsg)
Golf	Royal Dutch Golf Federation	Koninklijke Nederlandse Golf Federatie (NGF)
Handball	Netherlands Handball Association	Nederlands Handbal Verbond (NHV)
Archery	Dutch Archery Association	Nederlandse Handboog Bond (NHB)
Equestrian Sports	Royal Dutch Equestrian Sports Federation	Koninklijke Nederlandse Hippische Sportfederatie (KNHS)
Hockey	Royal Dutch Hockey Association	Koninklijke Nederlandse Hockey Bond (KNHB)
Judo	Judo Association Netherlands	Judo Bond Nederland (JBN)
Korfball	Royal Dutch Korfball Association	Koninklijk Nederlands Korfbal Verbond (KNKV)
Lawn Tennis	Royal Dutch Lawn Tennis Association	Koninklijke Nederlandse Lawn Tennis Bond (KNLTB)
Rowing	Royal Dutch Rowing Federation	Koninklijke Nederlandsche Roeibond (KNRB)
Chess	Royal Dutch Chess Federation	Koninklijke Nederlandsche Schaakbond (KNSB)
Ice Skating	Royal Dutch Ice Skaters Association	Koninklijke Nederlandsche Schaatsenrijders Bond (KNSB)
Sailing	Royal Netherlands Watersport Association	Koninklijk Nederlands Watersport Verbond
Skiing	Dutch Ski Association	Nederlandse Ski Vereniging
Table Tennis	Dutch Table Tennis Association	Nederlandse Tafeltennisbond (NTTB)
Triathlon	Dutch Triathlon Association	Nederlandse Triathlon Bond (NTB)
Volleyball	Dutch Volleyball Association	Nederlandse Volleybal Bond (NeVoBo)
Watersport	Royal Dutch Watersport Association	Koninklijk Nederlands Watersport Verbond (Watersportverbond)
Cycling	Royal Dutch Cycling Union	Koninklijke Nederlandsche Wielren Unie (KNWU)
Swimming	Royal Dutch Swimming Federation	Koninklijke Nederlandse Zwembond (KNZB)
