= Jumpei Yoshizawa =

Japanese speed skater (born 1985)

Personal information
- Born: March 16, 1985 (age 41) Nagano, Japan
- Height: 5 ft 9 in (175 cm)
- Weight: 154 lb (70 kg)

Sport
- Country: Japan
- Sport: Short track speed skating

Achievements and titles
- Highest world ranking: 30 (1500m)
Medal record
Men's short track speed skating
Representing Japan
World Team Championships
Silver medal – second place	2004 St. Petersburg	Team

Jumpei Yoshizawa (吉澤 純平, Yoshizawa Junpei; born March 16, 1985 in Nagano) is a Japanese former short-track speed-skater.

Yoshizawa competed at the 2010 Winter Olympics for Japan. In the 500 metres, he advanced to the quarterfinals, where he finished 4th, failing to advance. In the 1500 metres, he placed 5th in his opening heat, advancing to the semifinals, where he finished 6th, again failing to advance. His best overall finish was in the 500, where he placed 14th.

Yoshizawa's best performance at the World Championships came in 2004, when he placed 5th as a member of the Japanese 5000 metre relay team. He also won a bronze medal at the 2004 World Short Track Speed Skating Team Championships for Japan.

Yoshizawa's top World Cup ranking in short track speed skating is 30th, in the 1500 metres in 2009–10.
