= James Hewish =

James Hewish (born unknown) is an Australian short track speed skating referee who works for ISU. He participated in the 2002 Salt Lake City and 2010 Vancouver Winter Olympics as the chief referee in the short track speed skating events.

== Refereeing career ==
In the men's 1500 m short track speed skating event of the 2002 Winter Olympics, with one lap remaining and currently in second place, Apolo Ohno of the United States attempted to make a pass on the leader Kim Dong-Sung of South Korea, who then drifted to the inside and as a result, Ohno raised his arms to imply he was blocked. Kim finished first ahead of Ohno, but Hewish disqualified Kim for what appeared to be impeding, awarding the gold medal to Ohno. South Korean media accused Ohno of simulating a foul, using the Konglish word "Hollywood action". The disqualification of Kim upset South Korean supporters, many of whom directed their anger at Ohno and the International Olympic Committee. A large number of e-mails protesting the race results crashed the IOC's email server, and thousands of accusatory letters, many of which contained death threats, were sent to Ohno and the IOC. Hewish also received a significant backlash from the supporters of the South Korean team and fans.

Hewish again disqualified the South Korean team, who finished first, in the women's 3000m relay final at the 2010 Winter Olympics for blocking a Chinese skater. James subsequently received abusing and threatening emails including personal death threats from angry South Korean fans. A bomb threat was also made by a disgruntled fan against the Australian Embassy in Seoul, however it was later determined to be a hoax. James was provided police protection as a result of the threats.
