= Apolo Ohno =

American short track speed skater (born 1982)

Apolo Anton Ohno
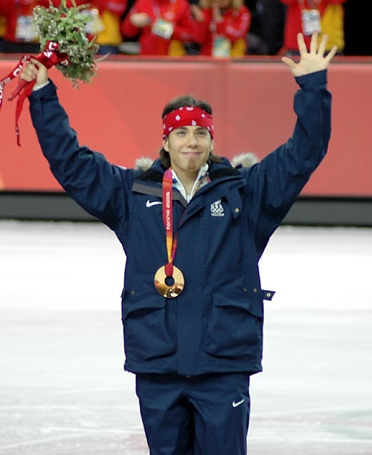
- Ohno at the 2006 Winter Olympics in Turin

Personal information
- Born: May 22, 1982 (age 44) Seattle, Washington, U.S.
- Height: 5 ft 8 in (173 cm)
- Weight: 65.7 kg (145 lb; 10 st 5 lb)
- Website: apoloohno.com

Sport
- Country: United States of America
- Sport: Short track speed skating
- Retired: 2010

Achievements and titles
- World finals: World Championship; 2008 Overall; World Cup; 2001 Overall; 2003 Overall; 2005 Overall
- Personal bests: 500 m: 41.327 (2009); 1000 m: 1:24.500 (2009); 1500 m: 2:11.280 (2003); 3000 m: 4:32.975 (2003)
Medal record
Men's short track speed skating
Representing the United States
Event	1st	2nd	3rd
Olympic Games	2	2	4
World Championships	8	7	6
World Team Championships	1	0	1
Olympic Games
Gold medal – first place	2002 Salt Lake City	1500 m
Gold medal – first place	2006 Turin	500 m
Silver medal – second place	2002 Salt Lake City	1000 m
Silver medal – second place	2010 Vancouver	1500 m
Bronze medal – third place	2006 Turin	1000 m
Bronze medal – third place	2006 Turin	5000 m relay
Bronze medal – third place	2010 Vancouver	1000 m
Bronze medal – third place	2010 Vancouver	5000 m relay
World Championships
Gold medal – first place	2001 Jeonju	3000 m
Gold medal – first place	2001 Jeonju	5000 m relay
Gold medal – first place	2005 Beijing	1000 m
Gold medal – first place	2005 Beijing	3000 m
Gold medal – first place	2007 Milan	1500 m
Gold medal – first place	2008 Gangneung	Overall
Gold medal – first place	2008 Gangneung	500 m
Gold medal – first place	2009 Vienna	5000 m relay
Silver medal – second place	1999 Sofia	500 m
Silver medal – second place	2001 Jeonju	Overall
Silver medal – second place	2001 Jeonju	1000 m
Silver medal – second place	2003 Warsaw	3000 m
Silver medal – second place	2005 Beijing	Overall
Silver medal – second place	2008 Gangneung	1000 m
Silver medal – second place	2009 Vienna	1000 m
Bronze medal – third place	2005 Beijing	5000 m relay
Bronze medal – third place	2007 Milan	Overall
Bronze medal – third place	2007 Milan	1000 m
Bronze medal – third place	2007 Milan	3000 m
Bronze medal – third place	2007 Milan	5000 m relay
Bronze medal – third place	2008 Gangneung	3000 m
World Team Championships
Gold medal – first place	2008 Harbin	Team
Bronze medal – third place	2009 Heerenveen	Team
World Junior Championships
Gold medal – first place	1999 Montreal	Overall

Apolo Anton Ohno (/əˈpɒloʊ ˈæntɒn ˈoʊnoʊ/; born May 22, 1982) is an American retired short-track speed skating competitor and an eight-time medalist (two gold, two silver, four bronze) in the Winter Olympics. Ohno was inducted into the International Sports Hall of Fame in 2017 and the U.S. Olympic Hall of Fame in 2019.

Raised by his father, Ohno began training full-time in 1996. At the age of 14, he became the youngest U.S. national champion in 1997 and was the reigning champion from 2001 to 2009, winning the title a total of 12 times. In December 1999, he became the youngest skater to win a World Cup event title, and became the first American to win a World Cup overall title in 2001, which he won again in 2003 and 2005. Ohno has been the face of short track in the United States since winning his medals at the 2002 Winter Olympics. He won his first overall World Championship title at the 2008 championships.

Ohno's accolades and accomplishments include the United States Olympic Committee's Male Athlete of the Month in October 2003 and March 2008, U.S. Speedskating's Athlete of the Year for 2003, and a finalist for the 2002, 2003, and 2006 Sullivan Award, which recognizes the best amateur athlete in the United States.

Since gaining recognition through his sport, Ohno has worked as a motivational speaker, philanthropist, started a nutritional supplement business, and won the 2007 season of Dancing with the Stars. Ohno later became host of a revival of Minute to Win It on Game Show Network and served as a commentator for NBC's coverage of the 2014 Winter Games in Sochi and the 2018 Winter Games in Pyeongchang. Outside of competing, he has been an entrepreneur in the health, wellness, and technology industries.

== Early life ==
Ohno was born in Seattle, Washington, to a Japanese-born father, Yuki Ohno (大野 幸, Ōno Yuki) and a European-American mother, Jerrie Lee. Ohno's parents divorced when he was an infant, and he was raised in Seattle by his father. He has had little contact with his biological mother; as of 2002, he had expressed no interest in knowing her or his older half-brother. Ohno's father, a hair stylist and owner of the salon Yuki's Diffusion, often worked 12-hour shifts, and, with no extended family in the United States, found it hard to balance his career with raising a child. His father chose to name his son Apolo not after the Olympian deity Apollo but rather after the Greek words apo, which means to "steer away from", and lo, which means "look out; here he comes."

When Ohno was very young, his father meticulously researched childcare providers to care for his son during his long work hours. As Apolo grew older, his father became concerned his son would become a latchkey kid, so Yuki got his son involved with competitive swimming and quad-speed roller skating at age 6. He later switched from the instruction of Benton Redford, a National Champion, to a team in Federal Way, Washington, called Pattison's Team Extreme and became a national inline speedskating champion and record holder himself. His father used inline speed skating to fill his spare time. Ohno's days were spent with morning swimming practices, followed by schooling, and finally skating practices in the afternoon.

When Ohno was 12, he won the Washington state championship in the breaststroke, but preferred inline speed skating over swimming. He has stated that by the time he turned 13, he attended parties with older teenagers if he did not have competitions on the weekends. His father has stated that it was a struggle balancing his son's desire for independence while helping him reach his potential as a young athlete.

== Skating career ==
=== Beginnings ===
When he was 13 years old, Ohno became interested in short track speed skating after seeing the sport during the 1994 Olympics in Lillehammer. His father capitalized on this interest by driving him to short track competitions throughout the northwest United States and Canada, and Ohno won several competitions in his age divisions. His father wanted to encourage Ohno to develop his skills and, although Ohno was underage, he got him admitted to the Lake Placid Olympic Training Center in 1996 to train full-time for short track. At 13, Ohno was the youngest skater admitted to the center.

At first, Ohno's commitment at Lake Placid was low until his teammates nicknamed him "Chunky", which motivated him to train harder. In January, he failed to make the 1997 U.S. Junior World Team. Ohno adjusted his training and made a comeback winning the 1997 U.S. Senior Championships overall title, taking a gold medal in the 1500 m, a silver in the 300 m, and came in fourth in the 500 m races. At the age of 14, he became the youngest person to win the title. Ohno then relocated to the Colorado Springs Olympic Training Center to begin training with the senior level skaters, despite being only 14 years old.

However, Ohno would struggle at the 1997 World Championships in Nagano, Japan, finishing 19th overall. After this disappointing defeat at his first appearance at a world championships, Ohno returned home to Seattle. He did not train from April to August 1997, so he gained weight and was ill-prepared for the 1998 Nagano Winter Olympics. As a result, he finished last in the Olympic trials and did not qualify for the Olympic team. Because of his losses at the World Championships and his failure to qualify for the Olympic team, Ohno recommitted himself to the sport and returned to junior-level skating at Lake Placid, rather than at Colorado Springs.

At the 1999 World Junior Championships, Ohno won first overall, placing first in the 1000 m and 1500 m, and winning silver in the 500 m. He won his second senior U.S. national championship in 1999. He finished fourth overall at the 1999 World Championships and earned a silver medal in the 500 m. At the 2000 U.S. Championships, Ohno was unable to defend his title and finished third overall. At the 2000 World Championships, Ohno finished ninth overall. In the 2000–2001 season, Ohno won his first World Cup overall title, regained his National title, and finished second overall in the World Championships, losing to Chinese skater Li Jiajun.

=== 2002 Winter Olympics ===
==== Qualification race controversy ====
In December 2001, during the U.S. Short Track Speed Skating 2002 Olympic Trials, speed skater Shani Davis was racing for a position on the short track team. Ohno and fellow skater Rusty Smith had already earned slots on the six-man team due to points earned from earlier races. In order for Davis to qualify, he had to place first in the final race—the 1000 m—by overcoming stronger skaters Ohno, Smith, and Ron Biondo. Since Ohno had been dominant in the meet to this point by winning every race he entered, a win by Davis seemed to be unlikely.

Though Ohno, Smith, and Biondo were heavily favored to win the 1000 m, the race ended with Ohno finishing third, Smith second, and Davis at the top of the podium. Prior to crossing the finish line, Ohno started celebrating for Davis and Smith. Davis' first-place finish earned enough points to move past Tommy O'Hare in the final point standings and to qualify for sixth place. By finishing second, Smith earned the opportunity to skate individually in the 1000 m. The victory celebration was short-lived as rumors began that Ohno and Smith, both good friends of Davis, intentionally threw the race so Davis would win.

After returning to Colorado Springs, O'Hare, who did not skate in the 1000 m, filed a formal complaint. The complaint was founded on Ohno's seemingly deliberate attempt to stop Biondo from being able to pass Smith. Because of that blocking move on Biondo, Smith finished in second place and Davis finished first. For three days, Ohno, Smith, and Davis stood before an arbitration panel of the United States Olympic Committee. During the hearing, Davis was never accused of being at fault and Smith made the statement: "Any allegation that there was a fix, conspiracy, or understanding between Apolo and me, or anyone else, to let Shani win the race is completely false. Shani is a great athlete, skated a great race, and deserves to be on the team." The final verdict was that O'Hare's claims went unproven, all three were absolved of guilt, and the claim was dismissed. After the dismissal, Ohno stated, "I am thrilled that the arbitration process has officially vindicated me... As I've said since the moment of these accusations, they were untrue and I did nothing wrong".

==== Games ====
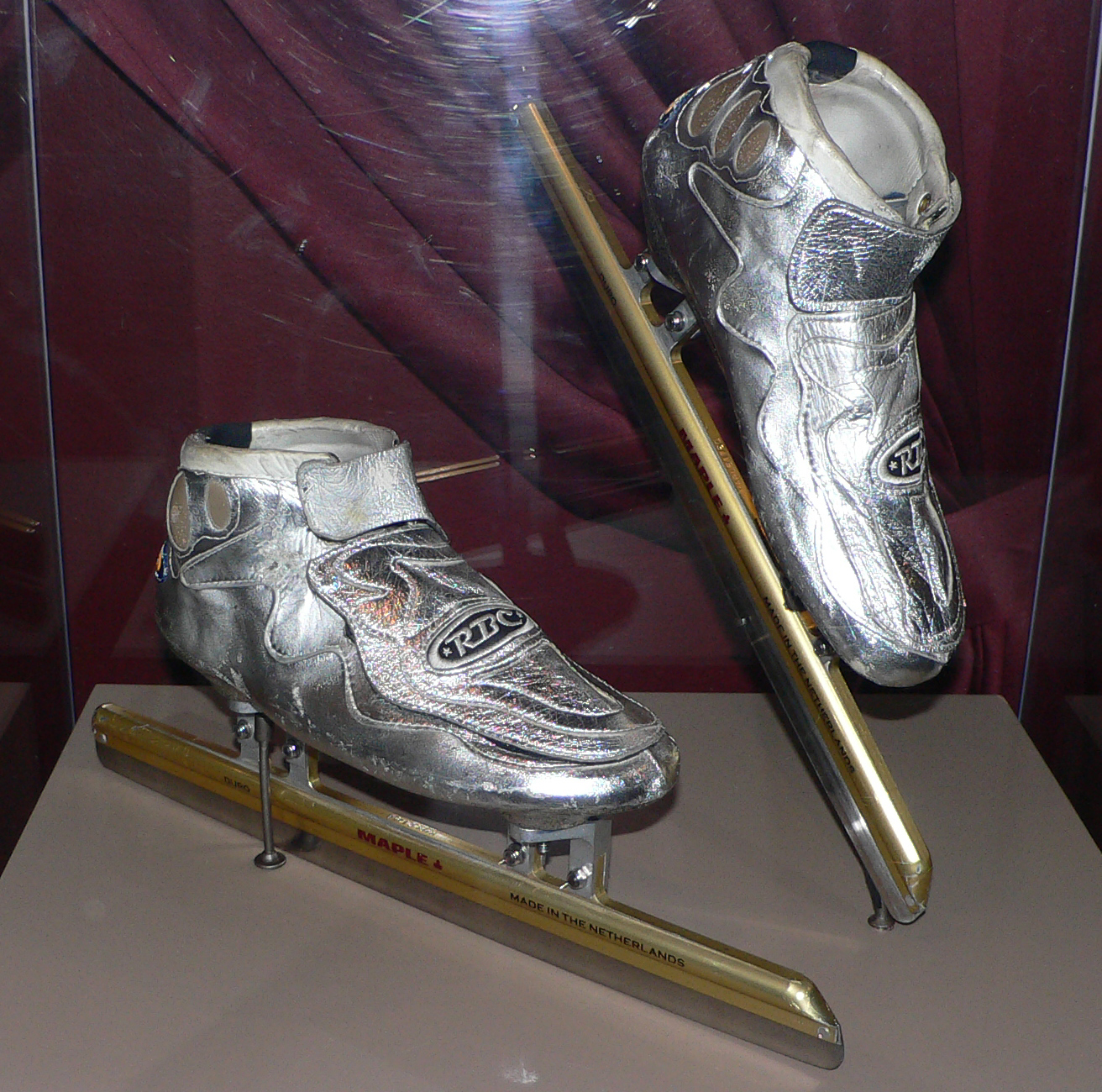
The skates Ohno wore at the 2002 Winter Olympics are preserved in the Smithsonian Institution National Museum of American History.

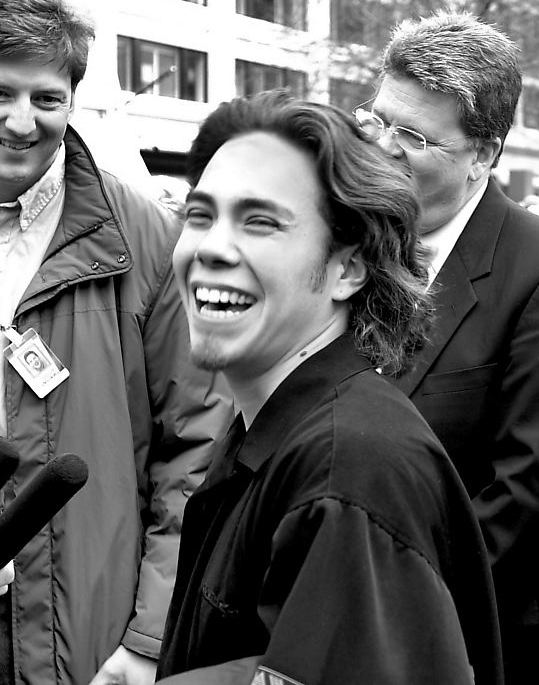
Ohno in Seattle, Washington, shortly after the 2002 Winter Olympics

At the 2002 Winter Olympics in Salt Lake City, Utah, Ohno emerged as the face of short-track speed skating among American fans. He was a medalist in two events, but there was controversy associated with the results.

After a disqualification in the 500 m race, he was leading the skaters in the 1000 m final. During a turn around the final corner, Ohno, Ahn Hyun Soo, Li Jiajun, and Mathieu Turcotte all fell in a series of cascading collisions. The last man standing, famously, was Steven Bradbury from Australia, who was strategically trailing behind for the duration of the race, skating through to win the gold medal and becoming the first person from the southern hemisphere to win a gold medal at a Winter Olympics. Ohno quickly scrambled to his feet and crossed the finish line to win silver, with Turcotte winning the bronze. Ohno, coincidentally, was wearing skates made by Bradbury's own boot company, Revolutionary Boot Company. Prior to the race, Bradbury, not expecting to win, had ironically emailed Ohno, writing: "If you win gold, make sure you give me a mention!"

In the 1500 m final race A, with one lap remaining and currently in second place, Ohno attempted to make a pass on the leader Kim Dong-Sung of South Korea, who then drifted to the inside and as a result, Ohno raised his arms to imply he was blocked. Kim finished first ahead of Ohno, but the Australian referee James Hewish disqualified Kim for what appeared to be impeding, awarding the gold medal to Ohno. The South Korean team immediately protested the decision, appealing to the International Skating Union (ISU), the International Olympic Committee (IOC) and the Court of Arbitration for Sport (CAS). The challenges were all denied after video review. South Korean media accused Ohno of simulating a foul, using the Konglish word "Hollywood action".

The disqualification of Kim upset South Korean supporters, many of whom directed their anger at Ohno and the IOC. A large number of e-mails protesting the race results crashed the IOC's email server, and thousands of accusatory letters, many of which contained death threats, were sent to Ohno and the IOC. Ohno shared his thoughts on the Koreans' hostile reaction by saying, "I was really bothered by it. I grew up around many Asian cultures, Korean one of them. A lot of my best friends were Korean growing up. I just didn't understand. Later on I realized that was built up by certain people and that was directed at me, negative energy from other things, not even resulting around the sport, but around politics, using me to stand on the pedestal as the anti-American sentiment".

=== After Salt Lake ===
Ohno continued to perform well in the sport after the 2002 Winter Games. He declined to participate in a 2003 World Cup short-track event in Korea for security reasons. Despite the absence, he successfully defended his World Cup title during the 2003 season. He continued his dominance by winning the World Cup title again in the 2004–2005 season.

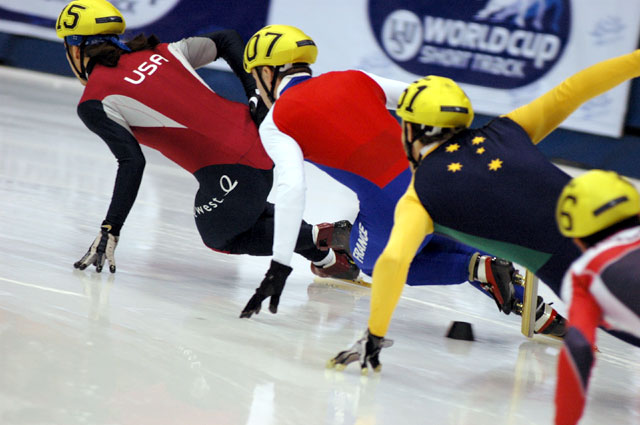
Ohno in lead at a 500 m short-track race at the 2004 World Cup in Saguenay

At the first event of the 2005 World Cup event in China, Ohno severely sprained his ankle and withdrew from the event. At the second event in South Korea, an estimated 100 riot police stood guard at Incheon International Airport to prevent harm from happening to Ohno. Their concern stemmed from a possible lingering negative reaction from the 2002 Olympic Games disqualification controversy.

Ohno won two gold medals, as well as the overall title at the meet despite suffering from a severe stomach illness, and was surprised when the Korean crowd cheered his victories, saying, "I was really happy with the crowd's reaction. It was pretty positive right from the time we landed. I was really happy it wasn't (hostile). Everything went really smooth. We were happy." He was unable to defend his World Cup title from the previous three seasons, finishing third in the 2005–2006 overall standings. At the 2005 World Championships, he finished second overall, winning the 1000 m and 3000 m races.

=== 2006 Winter Olympics ===
In the 2006 Winter Olympics in Turin, Italy, Ohno stumbled during a semifinal heat in the 1500 m. Finishing fifth, he was unable to defend his 2002 gold medal in the event. Ohno was able to win the bronze medal in the 1000 m, with Korean skaters Ahn Hyun Soo and Lee Ho-suk finishing before him.

After two false starts from other skaters, Ohno won gold in the 500 m when he took the lead with an explosive start and held it until the finish. Despite criticism that he appeared to move before the start, a violation of the rules, the race start was validated by the officials. Afterward, Ohno said, "I was in the moment at the time. I thought I timed the start just perfect. The starter had been pretty quick all day, so that's why there were so many false starts at the beginning. But that was really good for me."

On the same day as his 500 m gold win, he earned a bronze medal in the men's 5000 m relay, with an inside pass on Italian skater Nicola Rodigari on the final leg to put the United States in third position. Later, during the medals ceremony for the event, the winning South Korean team and the Americans embraced, followed by a group picture featuring the medalists.

=== Post-Olympic hiatus and return ===
Having taken a year off from competitive skating when the 2006 Winter Olympics ended, Ohno returned to win his eighth national title, placing first in every event during the U.S. Championships held from February 23–25, 2007. On April 26, 2007, he was inducted into the Asian Hall of Fame, an award which honors achievements of Asian Americans.

From March 9–11, 2007, he competed at the 2007 World Championships held in Milan, Italy, winning gold in the 1500 m due to the disqualification of Song Kyung-Taek, who had blocked a passing attempt made by Ohno. He won bronze in the 1000 m, 3000 m, and the 5000 m relay with teammates, Jordan Malone, Travis Jayner, and Ryan Bedford. Because of his wins, he became the overall bronze medalist, behind silver medalist Charles Hamelin and Ahn Hyun Soo, who became the first man to become a five-time World Champion.

On December 24, 2007, in Kearns, Utah, Ohno won his ninth national title, finishing first in the 1000 m and the 1500 m. He also finished first in the 500 m, but was disqualified for crosstracking. In the 3000 m, he finished second. At the 2008 World Championships in Gangneung, South Korea, Ohno won his first overall title, placing first place in the 500 m, second in the 1000 m, and third place in the 3000 m. He defeated South Koreans Lee Ho-Suk, silver medalist and Song Kyung-Taek who finished third in points. He was initially met with loud booing by the crowd, but managed to earn their applause with a clean skate in the 500 m.

In 2009, he won his 10th national title and qualified for the world team. Unable to defend his championship, he finished fifth in the overall rankings at the 2009 World Championships in Vienna, Austria, placing second at the 1000 m, and winning gold with the 5000 m relay team.

=== 2010 Winter Olympics ===
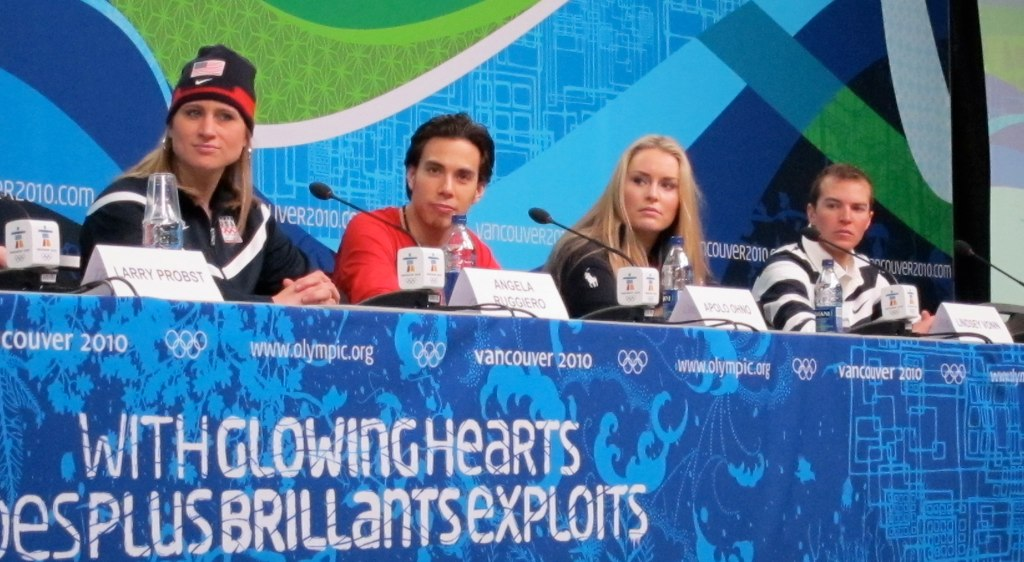
Closing ceremony press conference at the 2010 Winter Olympics featuring Angela Ruggiero, Ohno, Lindsey Vonn and Bill Demong

In preparation for the 2010 Winter Olympics, Ohno lost over 9 kilograms (20 lb) from his weight at the 2002 Winter Games. He went down to a 65.7 kilograms (145 lb) bodyframe and a 2.5% body fat percentage, enduring a 5-month 3-a-day training program combined with a strict nutritional program. As a result, he could lift double the weight he could before the training. With respect to his training regimen, Ohno said: "Come these Games, there's no one who's going to be fitter than me. There's just no way. Whether I can put it together on the ice or not and feel good, that's a different story. But I know, from a physical training standpoint, nobody's even close... I've never prepared like this in my life—for anything. I want to leave nothing on the table."

==== Trials ====
During the U.S. Olympic Trials held September 8–12, 2009, in Marquette, Michigan, Ohno won the overall meet title and defended his national title. He won the finals during the 500 m, 1000 m, and 1500 m races. However, during the 1000 m time trial, Ohno came in second to J. R. Celski despite skating a personal best of 1:24.500 to Celski's personal best of 1:23.981. Celski, who finished second overall and was leading in points after the first two nights of the trials, was injured during a crash in the semifinals of the 1000 m race when his right skate sliced into his left leg; he did not skate in the 1000 m finals. Ohno had a narrow victory in the 500 m, beating out the silver place finisher Jeff Simon by only .039 of a second. Ohno, Celski, Jordan Malone, Travis Jayner, and Simon Cho were the top five finishers at the trials. Afterwards, Ohno said of the nominated team: "This is the strongest team we've ever had. I feel really good about how we will do in the next Olympics."

==== Games ====
In the 1500 m final, Ohno placed second after two Korean skaters, Lee Ho-Suk and Sung Si-Bak, made contact and crashed into the wall during the final turn of the final lap. He was in fourth place leading into the crash, and moved into second place as a result, earning the silver. Fellow American skater J. R. Celski finished with the bronze medal. The gold medal went to South Korea's Lee Jung-Su. Lee Jung-Su criticized Ohno as "too aggressive" in a post-race news conference. Ohno stated in an interview that he was held by one of the Korean skaters, which possibly prevented him from winning gold. He drew anger in South Korea after adding, "I was hoping for another disqualification, kind of like what happened in Salt Lake City." Ohno's silver pushed his tally to six career Olympic medals, tying Bonnie Blair for most medals ever won by a U.S. Winter Olympian.

Heading into the 1000 m final, Ohno had won the overall silver medal for the 1000 m during the 2009–10 World Cup by competing in three of the four competitions during the season. During the finals of the 1000 m, Ohno finished in third place, making a comeback from a slip with less than three laps remaining. With the bronze medal win, he became the most decorated American athlete ever at the Winter Games with seven career medals. Bonnie Blair, the former record holder, said she was happy for his accomplishment, adding: "It's a great feat for him, U.S. speedskating, and the United States of America. We hope that more kids will see his accomplishments and want to try our great sport that has been so good to us and taught us so much about what it takes to be successful in life."

In the 500 m final, Ohno finished the race in second place behind Canada's Charles Hamelin. However, he was disqualified after impeding François-Louis Tremblay of Canada around the final turn. The silver medal went to Sung Si-Bak, with Tremblay taking the bronze.

The 5000 m relay team for the United States finished with the bronze medal. The team, consisting of J. R. Celski, Simon Cho, Travis Jayner, Jordan Malone, and Ohno, were in the fourth position for the majority of the race. With a strong push from Celski with two laps to go, Ohno as the anchor leg was able to pass the Chinese team for third place; Canada won the gold and South Korea took silver. This bronze medal was the eighth Olympic medal of his career.

=== Sponsorships ===
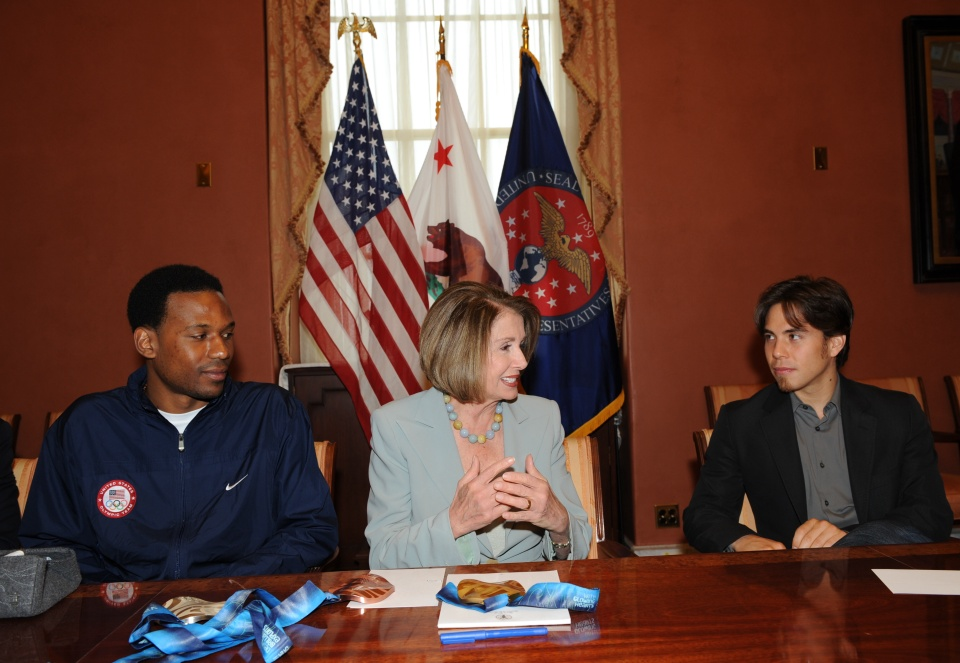
In 2010, Speaker Nancy Pelosi met with Shani Davis (left) and Ohno for the B.J. Stupak Scholarship, a federally-funded scholarship program designed to provide financial assistance to Olympic athletes.

Using his recognition and fame from his sport, he has accumulated a list of sponsors that includes McDonald's, General Electric, The Century Council, Vicks, and Coca-Cola. Ohno's father, Yuki, said about sponsorships: "He's not like a professional athlete who has a multi-million-dollar contract with a team... He has to have sponsorships to pay the bills". Capitalizing on Ohno's fame, Alaska Airlines was his primary sponsor for the 2010 Winter Games and designed a Boeing 737-800 jet with his image on the side.

On the other hand, Ohno has criticized the lack of support for athletes who are not at the very pinnacle of their sport. In the HBO documentary The Weight Of Gold (2020), Ohno characterized the attitude of potential sponsors as "How many golds do you have because if you're silver, you're not making money. You're bronze? You're not making money. You didn't medal? I don't even know your name, pal. Go back to the end of the line, OK?"

He was critical of the leaders of the U.S. Speedskating Organization when a donation of $250,000 was raised by viewers of the Comedy Central show The Colbert Report for the organization after their largest commercial sponsor, the Dutch DSB Bank, declared bankruptcy and was unable to donate its $300,000 in November 2009. In an email to Time, he wrote it was "a bit embarrassing that our leadership couldn't secure other sponsors three months before the Olympic Games" but credited the show's host Stephen Colbert for "his willingness to help out our nation's greatest athletes". In return for The Colbert Report donation, long track and short track skaters had the "Colbert Nation" logo on their uniforms for World Cup events leading up to the 2010 Winter Games. Ohno did not wear the logo because Alaska Airlines was his primary sponsor for the 2010 Games. He was also part of Oreo's Team DSRL sketch in 2011.

== Legacy ==
During his skating career in the United States, Ohno is credited with popularizing and being the face of his sport. He said it is amazing being able to be a role model to younger skaters since growing up, he did not have that influence within his sport, but looked up to other athletes outside his sport, such as Muhammad Ali, Joe Frazier, and Lance Armstrong. After the 2010 Winter Games, he created the Apolo Anton Ohno Foundation and partnered with the Century Council's Ask, Listen, Learn Program to discourage underage drinking of alcohol and to promote a healthy lifestyle.

=== Retirement ===
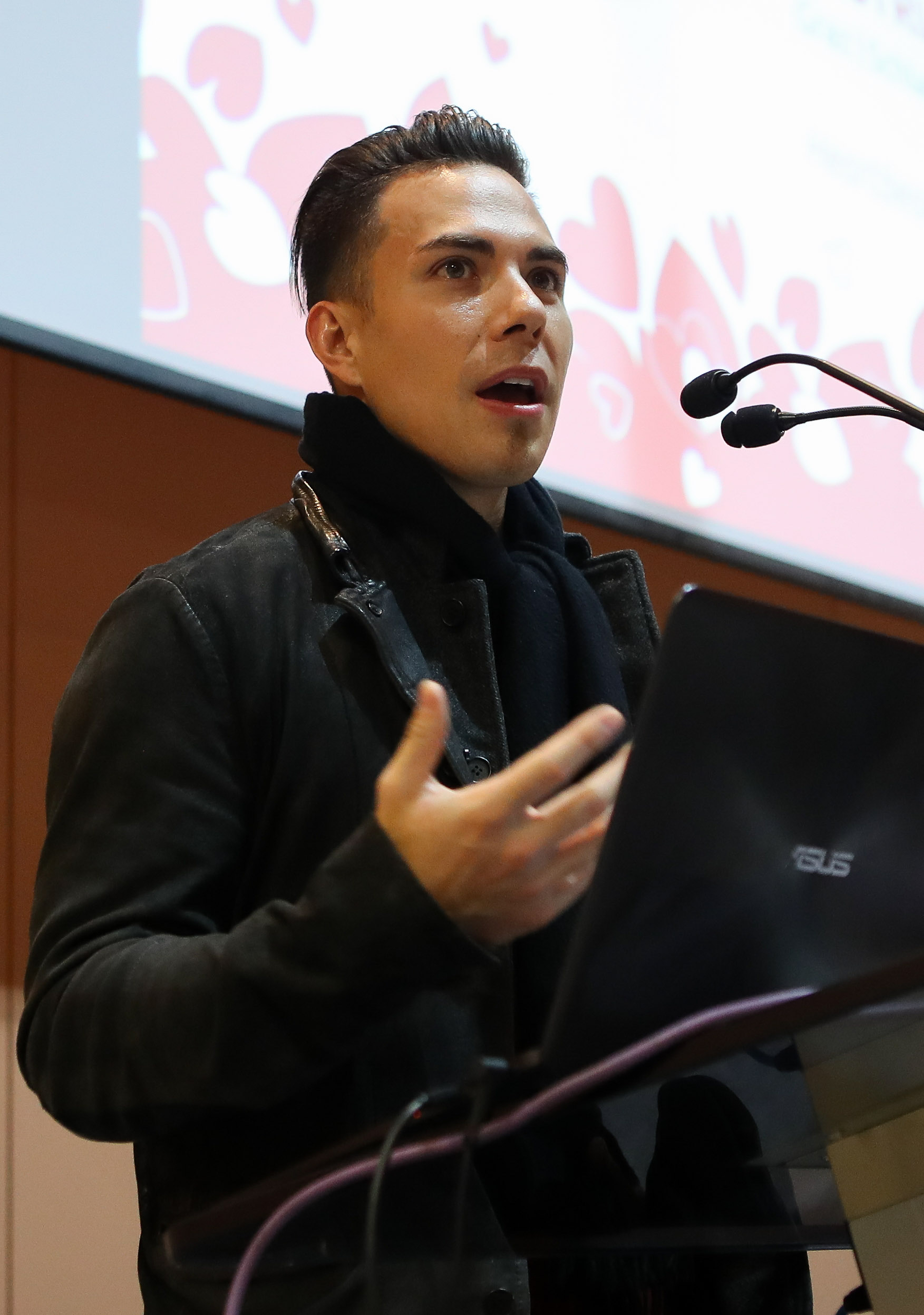
Ohno speaking at the 2017 Special Olympics World Winter Games

Ohno retired after the 2010 Olympics and appeared on NBC as a commentator for the 2014 Sochi Games and 2018 Pyeongchang Games. In November 2014 Ohno sponsored a speedskating race in Salt Lake City, Utah, that featured the four top men and women skaters from the US, China, Canada and the Netherlands. He has appeared in a number of television shows as a host, actor and guest star since his retirement.

In 2019, he was inducted into the U.S. Olympic Hall of Fame. Also in 2019, he announced he is writing a book that chronicles his transition from Olympic athlete to entrepreneur. He says the book will "...pull back the curtain, in a sense, and showcases all the inner workings that go into making an Olympic athlete and then also the other side of what happens after day 17 of the Games when you're no longer competing. You're at the top of your game, you're in top physical condition, top mental condition, and now you're thrust into a world that is very unfamiliar to you and you feel like an alien". The book, Hard Pivot was released February 22, 2022.

=== Activism ===
Ohno has supported several causes. He participated in GAP's campaign to fight the spread of HIV/AIDS in Africa by joining Product Red. Half of the proceeds went to The Global Fund to Fight AIDS, Tuberculosis and Malaria. Besides working with The Salvation Army and the Clothes off our Back Foundations, he used his fame to help raise funds for a Ronald McDonald House in Seattle after the 2002 Winter Games. He helped raise $20,000 for Nikkei Concerns, a provider of care and services for Japanese elders living in the Pacific Northwest. Later that year, Ohno joined Senator Ted Kennedy in Washington, D.C. to show the importance of math and science education by helping launch the "Math Moves U Hippest Homework Happening" program, which gave students the opportunity to do math homework online with celebrities and athletes.

He has also volunteered with the Special Olympics and taken part in Unified Sports, which brings together athletes with intellectual disabilities and without on the same team. Ohno served as a Special Olympics Global Ambassador ahead of the 2015 World Summer Games in Los Angeles, California. He continues to serve as a Special Olympics Global Ambassador.

== Television career ==
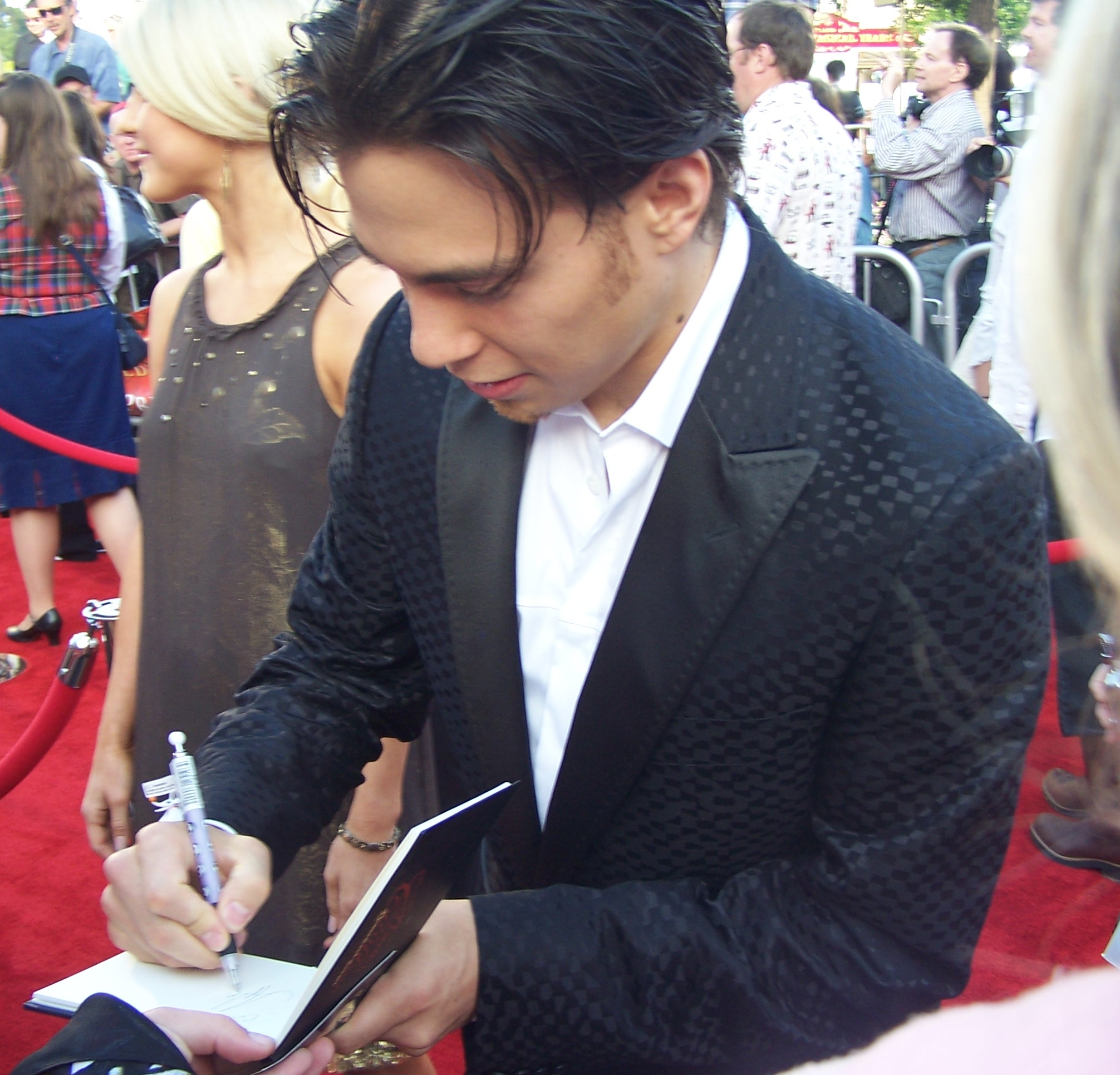
Ohno at the movie premiere of Pirates of the Caribbean 3

Ohno has had an interest in pursuing a career in the entertainment world. He participated and won the fourth season of the U.S. reality show Dancing with the Stars with his partner Julianne Hough. He returned for the 15th season which featured all-star celebrities. Ohno's interests in fashion led him to be a guest judge on the fashion reality show Project Runway in 2008, and to an endorsement deal with Omega, the maker of luxury watches, in 2010. Omega president Stephen Urquhart said, "We are very proud to support Apolo here in Vancouver and congratulate him on his outstanding performance. He is poised to make history of his own here and we are thrilled that he is part of the Omega family". He also appeared on Minute to Win It as the host of the GSN revival in 2013 since he is a fan of the show.

=== Dancing with the Stars ===
==== Season 4 (with Julianne Hough) ====
Ohno participated on the fourth season of the reality show, Dancing with the Stars. He was paired with professional dancer Julianne Hough, and both appeared on the show for the first time on March 19, 2007. Together, they received the competition's first perfect score of 30 for their samba routine on April 16, 2007. They were crowned the champions on May 22, 2007.

Apolo Ohno - Dancing with the Stars (season 4)
Week	Dance	Music	Judges' scores (Note: Individual judges' scores are listed in the following order: Carrie Ann Inaba, Len Goodman, Bruno Tonioli.)			Total score	Result
1	Cha-cha-cha	"Let's Hear It for the Boy" — Deniece Williams	7	7	7	21	Safe
2	Quickstep	"Two Hearts" — Phil Collins	8	9	9	26	Safe
3	Jive	"You Never Can Tell" — Chuck Berry	7	8	8	23	Safe
4	Waltz	"If You Don't Know Me by Now" — Simply Red	9	8	9	26	Safe
5	Samba	"I Like to Move It" — Reel 2 Real	10	10	10	30	Safe
6	Rumba	"Cool" — Gwen Stefani	9	9	10	28	Safe
7	Foxtrot	"Steppin' Out with My Baby" — Dinah Shore	9	8	9	26	Safe
7	Mambo	"Dr. Beat" — Miami Sound Machine	9	9	10	28	Safe
8	Tango	"Jessie's Girl" — Rick Springfield	10	8	10	28	Safe
8	Paso doble	"Carnaval de Paris" — Dario G	10	10	10	30	Safe
9	Quickstep	"Mr. Pinstripe Suit" — Big Bad Voodoo Daddy	10	10	10	30	Bottom two
9	Cha-cha-cha	"Push It" — Salt-N-Pepa	10	9	10	29	Bottom two
10	Rumba	"Midnight Train to Georgia" — Gladys Knight & the Pips	9	9	10	28	Winner
10	Freestyle	"Bust a Move" — Young MC	10	10	10	30	Winner
10	Paso doble	"Carnaval de Paris" — Dario G	10	10	10	30	Winner

==== Season 15 (with Karina Smirnoff) ====
In July 2012, it was announced Ohno would return for the fifteenth season, which was an All-Star season made up entirely of stars who had previously competed. This time, he was paired with season 13 champion Karina Smirnoff. They were voted off during the ninth week of the competition.

Apolo Ohno - Dancing with the Stars (season 15)
Week	Dance	Music	Judges' scores (Note: Individual judges' scores are listed in the following order: Carrie Ann Inaba, Len Goodman, Bruno Tonioli.)			Total score	Result
1	Cha-cha-cha	"Party Rock Anthem" — LMFAO, featuring Lauren Bennett & GoonRock	7.5	7	7.5	22	Safe
2	Quickstep	"Five Months, Two Weeks, Two Days" — Louis Prima	8.5	8	8	24.5	Safe
3	Foxtrot	"Fever" — Michael Bublé	9	8	8.5	25.5	Safe
4	Hip-Hop	"Poison" — Bell Biv DeVoe	8.5	9	8.5	34.5 (Note: Apolo also received a score of 8.5 from guest judge Paula Abdul.)	Safe
5	Team Freestyle	"Call Me Maybe" — Carly Rae Jepsen	9.5	10	10	29.5	Safe
5	Samba	"Give It to Me Baby" — Rick James	8.5	9.5	9	27	Safe
6	Viennese waltz	"Skin (Sarabeth)" — Rascal Flatts	10	10	10	30	Safe
6	Group Freestyle	"Save a Horse (Ride a Cowboy)" — Big & Rich & "I Play Chicken with a Train" — Cowboy Troy	No scores received				Safe
7	Cha-cha-cha & Paso doble Fusion	"Scream" — Usher	9	9	9	27	Safe
7	Swing Marathon	"Do Your Thing" — Basement Jaxx	–			6 (Note: Apolo received six points for this dance marathon.)	Safe
8	Tango	"Holding Out for a Hero" — Bonnie Tyler	10	9.5	10	29.5	Safe
8	Jive	"Greased Lightnin'" — John Travolta	9.5	9.5	10	29	Safe
9	Jazz	"What You Waiting For?" — Gwen Stefani	8.5	9	9.5	27	Eliminated
9	Rumba	"Man in the Mirror" — Michael Jackson	10	10	10	30	Eliminated

=== Other appearances ===
Ohno has appeared in a number of television shows as a guest star, an actor and as a host. He guest-starred in the 17th episode of the 2nd season of Hawaii Five-0, (2012) as a suspect and guest starred in The Biggest Loser in Season 12, Episode 9 and Season 15, Episode 12. He appeared as the live guest during the season finale of NBC's live variety show Best Time Ever with Neil Patrick Harris in 2015. The following year, Ohno appeared as a guest star on Hollywood Game Night hosted by Jane Lynch on NBC. Ohno also appeared in the Nick Jr. series Ryan's Mystery Playdate. The clues Ryan got were an ice rink, 8 medals, and ice skates.

In 2012, he appeared as a grocery store produce worker on the CBS show I Get That a Lot.

In 2013, Ohno appeared as the character "Stone" in the Syfy Original Movie Tasmanian Devils, as well as the host of GSN's Minute to Win It. In 2016, he made a guest appearance as himself in an American single-camera sitcom television series Superstore. In 2017, Ohno appeared as a host in the second season of the reality-competition series Spartan: Ultimate Team Challenge. The second season premiered on June 12, 2017. In the same year, Ohno appeared on an episode of The $100,000 Pyramid. This episode aired on July 9, 2017.

In 2021, Ohno appeared as a contestant on the NBC game show The Wall to raise money for the Team USA Fund. The episode aired on February 22, 2021.

== Business ==
After retiring from short track, Ohno began traveling between the U.S. and countries in Asia to pursue business in manufacturing, infrastructure development, software and hardware technologies, and health and wellness supplements. He invested in a Finnish company called Oura Health and is also the cofounder of Allysian Sciences, a health and supplement company. Ohno studied business at the University of Colorado at Colorado Springs.

Awards and achievements
Preceded by Emmitt Smith & Cheryl Burke	Dancing with the Stars (US) winner Season 4 (Spring 2007 with Julianne Hough)	Succeeded by Hélio Castroneves & Julianne Hough
Preceded by Melissa Gilbert & Maksim Chmerkovskiy	Dancing with the Stars (US) quarter-finalist Season 15 (Fall 2012 with Karina Smirnoff)	Succeeded by Ingo Rademacher & Kym Johnson
