= The Cooking Canon =

British celebrity chef

The Cooking Canon is the screen name of John Eley, a British celebrity chef.

Eley appears on television and radio, contributes to a range of magazines and tours the country with his road show.

== Career ==
Born in 1949, he is an English Anglican priest who was a lighting engineer before studying for the priesthood at Salisbury & Wells Theological College. His first post was as a Curate at Sherborne Abbey, after which he became a Minor Canon at Carlisle Cathedral.

During his time at Sherborne, Eley began to promote the Abbey Cookery recipe book in Sherborne bookshops and he was spotted by BBC TV producers. In 1980 he began to appear as a chef on the BBC television show Pebble Mill at One, and subsequently presented a regular cookery slot on the breakfast TV programme Good Morning Britain with TV-am.

His ecclesiastical career then took him to All Saints, Bromsgrove and after that Kedington Benefice - Great Bradley.

=== Bibliography ===
Eley's television success led to the publication of a series of cookery books by BBC Books:

- Eley, John (1984). The Cooking Canon. BBC Books. ISBN 978-0563202592.
- Eley, John (1985). The Cooking Canon Entertains : Lunch and Dinner Party Menus. BBC Books. ISBN 978-0563203636.
- Eley, John; Blue, Lionel (1986). Simply Divine: Recipes from the Cooking Canon & Rabbi Blue. BBC Books. ISBN 978-0563204596.
- Eley, John (1987). Canon's Fodder: A Celebration of British Cooking. BBC Books. ISBN 9780563205319.
