= Robert Seifert =

German speed skater

Personal information
- Born: January 31, 1988 (age 38) Dresden, East Germany
- Height: 5 ft 11 in (180 cm)
- Weight: 174 lb (79 kg)

Sport
- Country: Germany
- Sport: Short track speed skating

Achievements and titles
- World finals: 3
- Highest world ranking: 5 (500m)
Medal record
Men's short track speed skating
Representing Germany
World Championships
Silver medal – second place	2011 Sheffield	5000 m relay
Bronze medal – third place	2010 Sofia	5000 m relay

Robert Seifert (born January 31, 1988, in Dresden) is a German short-track speed-skater.

Seifert competed at the 2010 Winter Olympics for Germany. In the 500 metres, he placed third in his round one heat, failing to advance. As a member of the German 5000 metre relay team, he finished 3rd in the semifinal and 2nd in the B Final, ending up 5th overall. In the 500 metres, he finished 18th overall.

As of 2013, Seifert's best performance at the World Championships came in 2011, when he won a silver medal as a member of the German 5000m relay team. His best individual performance at a World Championships was in 2012, when he came 4th in the 500 metres. He also won a silver medal as a member of the German relay team at the 2010 European Championships.

As of 2013, Seifert has two ISU Short Track Speed Skating World Cup victories, one as part of the relay team in 2010–11 at Dresden, and in the 500 metres at Nagoya in 2012–13. His top World Cup ranking is 5th, in the 500 metres in 2012–13.

== World Cup podiums ==
Date	Season	Location	Rank	Event
20 February 2011	2010–11	Dresden	1st place, gold medalist(s)	5000m Relay
2 December 2012	2012–13	Nagoya	1st place, gold medalist(s)	500m
