= Simon Cho =

Short-track speed skater

Personal information
- Nationality: American
- Born: October 7, 1991 (age 35) Seoul, South Korea
- Height: 6 ft 0 in (183 cm)
- Weight: 153 lb (69 kg)

Korean name
- Hangul: 조성문
- RR: Jo Seongmun
- MR: Cho Sŏngmun

Sport
- Country: United States
- Club: Potomac Speedskating Club (Arlington County, Virginia)
- Turned pro: 2008

Achievements and titles
- Olympic finals: 1
- Highest world ranking: 8 (500m) 15 (overall)
Medal record
Men's short track speed skating
Representing the United States
Olympic Games
Bronze medal – third place	2010 Vancouver	5000 m relay
World Championships
Gold medal – first place	2011 Sheffield	500 m
Silver medal – second place	2010 Sofia	5000 m relay
Bronze medal – third place	2011 Sheffield	5000 m relay

Simon Cho (born October 7, 1991) is a retired Korean American short track speed skater who was a member of the US Olympic Team for the 2010 Winter Olympics in Vancouver. He is currently the head coach at Potomac Speed Skating Club. Since Cho has become head coach, Potomac Speed Skating Club has been one of the top ranked clubs in the United States with evidence pointing from their Short Track National Club Championship 2016–2017 in March 2017 and a back to back team championship performance at the Buffalo Short Track Championships on October 21–22, 2017.

== Early life ==
Cho was born in Seoul, South Korea and moved to the United States as an undocumented immigrant with his parents at the age of four and settled in Chicago. He remained an undocumented immigrant until he reached the age of 11.

Growing up, Cho recounted that life was financially difficult as an undocumented immigrant, stating, "My parents left for work before I woke up and came back home after I went to sleep. We had financial difficulties and there were times when we had no water or electricity for a few days because we weren't able to pay the bills. Other daily activities that others take for granted such as having a drivers’ license was difficult for my father". Due to a display of skill in speed skating, his parents sold their business and spent their savings to move to Salt Lake City to train Cho for the sport after he graduated from junior high school. Simon Cho now resides in Rockville, Maryland and when he is not coaching, he enjoys watching sports, documentaries and attending concerts.

== Career ==
Cho began skating at the age of 3. He trained in Salt Lake City but moved back to Upper Marlboro, Maryland a year before the U.S. Olympic Trials, initially quit speed skating after failing to qualify for performance grants from the U.S. Olympic Committee and U.S. Speedskating which would have offset the unaffordable costs of $40,000 for training. About his chances of making the Olympic team, Cho said, "When I say nobody thought I would make the team, literally nobody thought I would make it...Not even me". However, at the age of 18, Cho qualified for the 2010 U.S. Olympic team. Apolo Ohno noted that Cho "basically made this team training on his own". Cho cites Ohno and Shani Davis as mentors who helped him face challenges as being a person of color in the sport.

At the Vancouver Olympics, he competed in the 500 meter and 5000 meter relay events. Cho earned a bronze medal in the relay after skating in the semifinals.

On August 27, 2013, Cho received a two-year suspension from competitions after he admitted having sabotaged his Canadian rival's Olivier Jean's equipment during the 2011 World Team Championships. Cho claimed that he acted on an order from his coach Jae-Su Chun. The suspension ran through October 4, 2014, which means Cho missed the chance to qualify for the 2014 Winter Olympics in Sochi. He is now the coach of his home club, the Potomac Speedskating Club, now based in Wheaton, MD.
