= Bartosz Konopko =

Polish short track speed skater

Personal information
- Born: 6 June 1988 (age 37) Białystok, Poland
- Height: 1.78 m (5 ft 10 in)
- Weight: 75 kg (165 lb)

Sport
- Country: Poland
- Sport: Short track speed skating

Bartosz Konopko (born 6 June 1988) is a Polish short track speed skater. He competed in the 2018 Winter Olympics.
