= Jack Whelbourne =

British short track speed skater

Personal information
- Born: 2 August 1991 (age 34) Nottingham, England
- Height: 176 cm (5 ft 9 in)
- Weight: 61 kg (134 lb)

Sport
- Country: Great Britain
- Sport: Short track speed skating
- Club: Nottinghamshire

Achievements and titles
- Personal best(s): 1000 m: 1:24.481; 1500 m: 2:14.574; 3000 m: 4:51:364
Medal record
Men's short track speed skating
Representing Great Britain
World Championships
Bronze medal – third place	2014 Montreal	5000 m relay
World Junior Championships
Silver medal – second place	2011 Courmayeur	Overall

Jack Whelbourne (born 2 August 1991 in Nottingham) is a former British short track speed skater.

== Career ==
Whelbourne was born in 1991 in Nottingham and he learnt to skate at the age of six and within eight years he was representing his country.

He competed in the short track events at the 2010 Winter Olympics for Great Britain. He qualified for the semi-finals of the 1500 m after a crash in his heat took out two of his competitors, allowing him to finish in the final qualifying position. However he was eliminated at the semi-final stage. He also took part in the 5000 m Relay team. He was a bronze medallist in the 2010 World Junior Championships and is a former European Junior champion.

Whelbourne's coach is Nicky Gooch. Whelbourne was chosen to compete at three distances at the Sochi Olympics in 2014. He was the first British athlete to make a 1500m final on 10 February but he collided with a dislodged rubber bollard and fell. The 1500 metre final was won by Charles Hamelin.
