= Niels Kerstholt =

Dutch speed skater (born 1983)

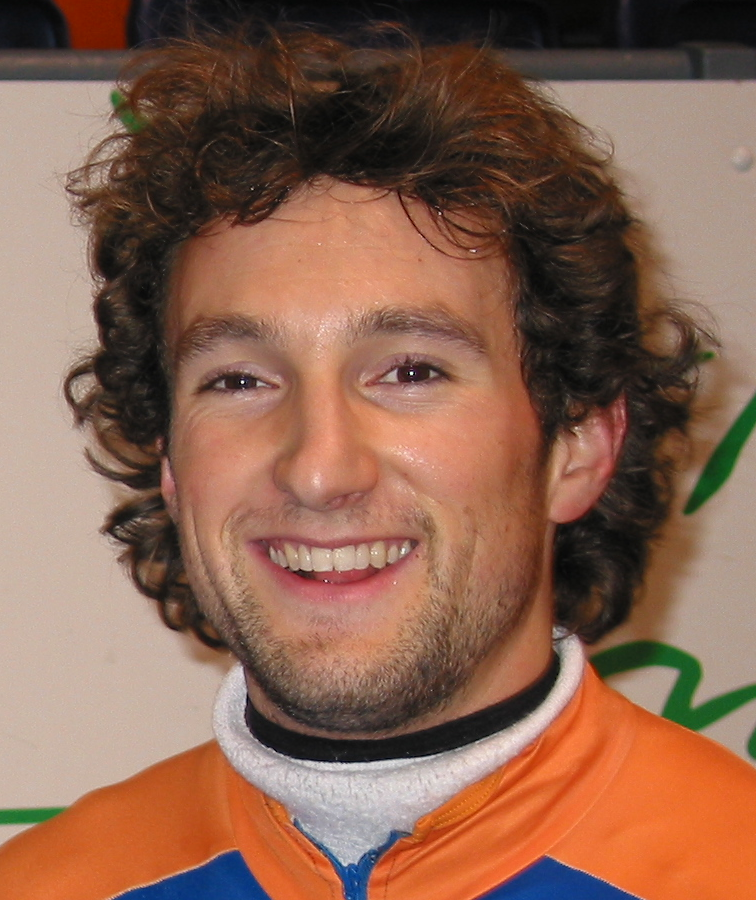
- Kerstholt in 2006

Personal information
- Nationality: Dutch
- Born: 2 April 1983 (age 43) Utrecht, Netherlands

Sport
- Country: Netherlands
- Sport: Short track speed skating
- Turned pro: 2002
- Retired: 2014
Medal record
Men's short track speed skating
Representing the Netherlands
World Championships
Gold medal – first place	2014 Montreal	5000 m Relay
Silver medal – second place	2012 Shanghai	5000 m Relay
Bronze medal – third place	2013 Debrecen	5000 m Relay

Niels Kerstholt (born 2 April 1983 in Utrecht) is a retired Dutch short track speed skater and current head coach of the TeamNL national short track squad.

== Career ==
Kerstholt qualified himself for the 2006 Winter Olympics by finishing among the first twelve in a virtual ranking over 1000 metres using the results of the Speed Skating World Cup meetings in Bormio and The Hague in November 2005. This way he met the requirements set by the Dutch Olympic Committee and was his ticket to Turin reserved. As the Dutch also had a starting entry left at the 1500 metres which was not taken by any other skater Kerstholt also participated at this distance during the Olympics.

At the distance where he qualified himself, the 1000 metres, he was eliminated in the series. However, at the 1500 metres he reached the semi-finals and started in the B-final as a result. Here he became fifth out of six skaters, which meant he finished in 11th position in the end. A few weeks after the Olympics Kerstholt became Dutch National Champion for the first time in his career. A year later he would successfully defend his title. He also broke the Dutch National Record over 1500 metres held by Robbert-Kees Boer with more than two seconds from 2:16.881 to a new best time of 2:14.885.

== Coaching career ==
In 2018, Kerstholt was appointed as a youth coach within the Royal Dutch Speed Skating Association.

In May 2022, Kerstholt succeeded Jeroen Otter as head coach of the TeamNL national short track squad.

Kerstholt oversaw the Dutch squad at the 2026 Winter Olympics, where the Netherlands broke the national record for most short track medals won at a single Olympics with five golds, one silver and one bronze.
