= Blake Skjellerup =

New Zealand speed skater

Personal information
- Born: 13 June 1985 (age 41) Christchurch, New Zealand
- Height: 1.76 m (5 ft 9 in)
- Weight: 71 kg (157 lb)
- Website: blakeskjellerup.com

Sport
- Country: New Zealand
- Sport: Speed skating
- Club: Hauraki Ice Racing Club

Achievements and titles
- Olympic finals: 16th, 1000m Vancouver 2010
- Highest world ranking: 11th, 1000m

Blake Skjellerup (born 13 June 1985 in Christchurch, New Zealand) is a short track speed skater who competed for New Zealand at the 2010 Winter Olympics; finishing sixteenth.

== Sporting career ==
Skjellerup began speed skating at the age of 10 in Christchurch after an injury from roller blading forced him to stop playing rugby union for a season. His brother introduced him to speed skating to keep him active. Blake quickly took to the sport and began spending as much time as he could in skates. In short track Blake had found not only has passion but something that he was good at.

In his career he has won five New Zealand national titles and broken numerous national records throughout his career. Skjellerup currently holds 3 New Zealand individual records in the 500, 1000, 1500 meter event, and 1 record in the 5000m men's relay.

He attempted to qualify for the 2014 Winter Olympics in Sochi, Russia but was not selected.

Skjellerup is currently living in Sydney, Australia.

== Personal life ==
Skjellerup is of Danish and Māori (Ngāti Pāmoana) descent. In 2003 he was awarded the Junior Māori Sportsman at that year's Māori Sports Awards.

Skjellerup came out as gay in an interview with Australian magazine DNA in May 2010, saying he had decided to wait until after the Vancouver Games to do so in order to focus on his performance and to avoid turning off potential sponsors. He is one of only a few openly gay Olympic athletes and was reported at the time as having a partner, also an athlete.

In 2011, Skjellerup and Matthew Mitcham, a gay Olympic athlete from Australia, were named by the Federation of Gay Games as ambassadors to the 2014 Gay Games in Cleveland, Ohio. Skjellerup also became an advocate for Pink Shirt Day, a nationwide campaign to fight bullying in New Zealand. In 2014 he appeared in the documentary film To Russia with Love.

In July 2015, Skjellerup married his boyfriend, lifestyle blogger Saul Carrasco, in Hawaii.
