= Noh Jin-kyu =

South Korean short track speed skater

Personal information
- Born: 20 July 1992
- Died: 3 April 2016 (aged 23)
- Height: 178 cm (5 ft 10 in)
- Weight: 69 kg (152 lb)

Sport
- Country: South Korea
- Sport: Short track speed skating
- Club: Korea National Sport University

Achievements and titles
- World finals: 2011 Overall
Medal record
Men's short track speed skating
Representing South Korea
World Championships
Gold medal – first place	2011 Sheffield	Overall
Gold medal – first place	2011 Sheffield	1000 m
Gold medal – first place	2011 Sheffield	1500 m
Gold medal – first place	2011 Sheffield	3000 m
Gold medal – first place	2012 Shanghai	1500 m
Silver medal – second place	2012 Shanghai	Overall
Silver medal – second place	2012 Shanghai	1000 m
Silver medal – second place	2012 Shanghai	3000 m
Bronze medal – third place	2012 Shanghai	5000 m Relay
World Team Championships
Gold medal – first place	2011 Warsaw	Team
Asian Winter Games
Gold medal – first place	2011 Astana-Almaty	1500 m
Gold medal – first place	2011 Astana-Almaty	5000 m relay
Winter Universiade
Gold medal – first place	2013 Trentino	1000 m
Gold medal – first place	2013 Trentino	1500 m
World Junior Championships
Gold medal – first place	2010 Taipei	Overall
Gold medal – first place	2010 Taipei	1000 m
Gold medal – first place	2010 Taipei	1500 m
Gold medal – first place	2010 Taipei	3000 m relay

Noh Jin-Kyu (Korean: 노진규; Hanja: 盧珍圭, 20 July 1992 – 3 April 2016) was a South Korean short track speed skater. During his first season at the senior level at the age of 18, he became the 2011 Overall World Champion. He was the World Record holder for 1500m and 3000m and team member for the 5000m Relay WR.

== Career ==
Noh won the 2010 Junior World Championships, and due to the format of the South Korean National Team selection rules, he was able to win a spot on the team with his speediness on the ice for the 2010-2011 season despite his inexperience compared to veterans of the sport. He quieted critics of his placement on the team by performing well at the 2011 Asian Winter Games, but struggled against experienced skaters at international events during the 2010–11 ISU Short Track Speed Skating World Cup, where technical aspects such as positioning skills are considered essential.

Overcoming his performances during the World Cup season, he dominated at the 2011 World Short Track Speed Skating Championships, winning gold in every race except the 500 m, where he did not qualify for the quarterfinals. He won the overall World Championship in his first season on the senior level. In the following week, Noh helped Korea to win 2011 World Team Championships (last one to be scheduled into foreseeable future) in Warsaw, setting a new world record in 3000m in the process.

He discovered a benign tumor in his left shoulder in September 2013 and upon further inspection, it was discovered that he had a five-inch malignant tumor in his shoulder. He delayed surgery to allow him to compete at the 2014 Winter Olympics in Sochi. He would have competed in the Olympics, but was ruled out due to a broken elbow. He died on 3 April 2016 from cancer.

== Personal life ==
His sister, Noh Seon-yeong, is also a speed skater.
