= 2011 World Short Track Speed Skating Championships =

International speed skating competition

- Venue: Sheffield Arena
- Dates: 11–13 March
- Competitors: 124 from 31 nations

The 2011 World Short Track Speed Skating Championships took place between 11 and 13 March 2011 at the Sheffield Arena in Sheffield, England. The World Championships were organised by the ISU which also runs world cups and championships in speed skating and figure skating.

== Schedule ==
Date	Time	Program
11 March	17:35	1500 m women
11 March	17:40	1500 m men
12 March	17:10	500 m women
12 March	17:15	500 m men
13 March	15:35	1000 m women
13 March	15:40	1000 m men
13 March	16:20	3000 m women
13 March	16:30	3000 m men
13 March	16:55	3000 m relay women
13 March	17:05	5000 m relay men

== Results ==
* First place is awarded 34 points, second is awarded 21 points, third is awarded 13 points, fourth is awarded 8 points, fifth is awarded 5 points, sixth is awarded 3 points, seventh is awarded 2 points, and eighth is awarded 1 point in the finals of each individual race to determine the overall world champion. The leader after the first 1000m in the 3000m Super-Final is awarded extra 5 points. The relays do not count for the overall classification.

=== Men ===
Event	Gold		Silver		Bronze	
Overall*	Noh Jin-kyu; South Korea	102 points	Charles Hamelin; Canada	50 points	Liang Wenhao; China	47 points
500 m	Simon Cho; United States	42.307	Olivier Jean; Canada	42.429	Liang Wenhao; China	42.493
1000 m	Noh Jin-kyu; South Korea	1:28.552	Charles Hamelin; Canada	1:28.663	Liang Wenhao; China	1:29.203
1500 m	Noh Jin-kyu; South Korea	2:18.291	Charles Hamelin; Canada	2:18.676	Jeff Simon; United States	2:18.725
5000 m relay	Canada; Michael Gilday; Charles Hamelin; François Hamelin; Olivier Jean	6:52.731	Germany; Robert Becker; Paul Herrmann; Christoph Milz; Robert Seifert; Torsten Kröger	6:54.693	United States; Kyle Carr; Travis Jayner; Anthony Lobello; Jeff Simon; Simon Cho	7:01.659

=== Women ===
Event	Gold		Silver		Bronze	
Overall*	Cho Ha-ri; South Korea	81 points	Katherine Reutter; United States	68 points	Arianna Fontana; Italy	57 points
500 m	Fan Kexin; China	44.620	Arianna Fontana; Italy	44.687	Liu Qiuhong; China	44.784
1000 m	Cho Ha-ri; South Korea	1:38.895	Arianna Fontana; Italy	1:40.306	Katherine Reutter; United States	2:23.268
1500 m	Katherine Reutter; United States	2:33.978	Park Seung-hi; South Korea	2:34.218	Cho Ha-ri; South Korea	2:34.336
3000 m relay	China; Fan Kexin; Li Jianrou; Liu Qiuhong; Zhang Hui; Xiao Han	4:16.295	Netherlands; Jorien ter Mors; Annita van Doorn; Sanne van Kerkhof; Yara van Kerkhof	4:17.725	Canada; Marie-Ève Drolet; Jessica Hewitt; Valérie Maltais; Marianne St-Gelais	4:18.043

== Medal table ==
7 nations won at least one medal, which represents the highest total ever.

Rank	Nation	Gold	Silver	Bronze	Total
1	South Korea	5	1	1	7
2	United States	2	1	3	6
3	China	2	0	4	6
4	Canada	1	4	1	6
5	Italy	0	2	1	3
6	Germany	0	1	0	1
6	Netherlands	0	1	0	1
Totals (7 entries)		10	10	10	30

== Entries per Event ==
Each nation can enter up to a maximum of 2 athletes per event, the nations listed below can enter up to three athletes per gender for that respective gender.

Athletes	Men	Ladies
3	Canada; China; France; South Korea; United States	Canada; China; South Korea

== Participating countries ==
124 athletes from 31 nations will compete.

- Argentina (1)
- Australia (2)
- Austria (1)
- Belarus (4)
- Bosnia and Herzegovina (1)
- Bulgaria (4)
- Canada (8)
- China (9)
- Chinese Taipei (2)
- Croatia (1)
- Czech Republic (1)
- France (4)
- Germany (7)
- Great Britain (6)
- Hong Kong (2)
- Hungary (4)
- Israel (1)
- Italy (6)
- Japan (6)
- Latvia (1)
- Netherlands (8)
- New Zealand (1)
- Poland (4)
- Romania (3)
- Russia (6)
- Slovakia (3)
- South Korea (10)
- Spain (4)
- Turkey (1)
- Ukraine (4)
- United States (9)
