= Liang Wenhao =

Chinese speed skater

Personal information
- Born: July 6, 1992 (age 34) Fushun, Liaoning, China
- Height: 170 cm (5 ft 7 in)
- Weight: 65 kg (143 lb)

Sport
- Country: China
- Sport: Short track speed skating
- Coached by: Li Yan (National Team Coach)

Achievements and titles
- Personal bests: 500m: 40.647 (2013); 1000m: 1:24.746 (2013); 1500m: 2:15.453 (2010); 3000m: 4:51.877 (2011)
Medal record
Men's short track speed skating
Representing China
World Championships
| Gold medal – first place | 2010 Sofia | 500 m |
| Gold medal – first place | 2013 Debrecen | 500 m |
| Silver medal – second place | 2011 Sheffield | 3000 m |
| Bronze medal – third place | 2010 Sofia | Overall |
| Bronze medal – third place | 2011 Sheffield | 500 m |
| Bronze medal – third place | 2011 Sheffield | 1000 m |
| Bronze medal – third place | 2011 Sheffield | Overall |
World Team Championships
| Silver medal – second place | 2011 Warsaw | Team |
| Bronze medal – third place | 2010 Bormio | Team |
World Junior Championships
| Silver medal – second place | 2009 Sherbrooke | 3000 m relay |
Asian Winter Games
| Gold medal – first place | 2011 Astana-Almaty | 500 m |

Liang Wenhao (Chinese: 梁文豪; pinyin: Liáng Wénháo; born July 6, 1992) is a Chinese male short track speed skater. He represented China at the 2010 Winter Olympics in Vancouver and the 2014 Winter Olympics in Sochi.
