= Song Weilong (speed skater) =

Chinese short track speed skater

Personal information
- Born: December 9, 1989 (age 36) Shenyang, Liaoning, China
- Height: 179 cm (5 ft 10 in)
- Weight: 67 kg (148 lb)

Sport
- Country: China
- Sport: Short track speed skating

Achievements and titles
- Personal best(s): 500m: 42.321 (2009); 1000m: 1:24.912 (2011); 1500m: 2:09.995 (2011); 3000m: 5:00.263 (2011)
Medal record
Men's short track speed skating
Representing China
World Championships
Silver medal – second place	2009 Vienna	5000 m relay
World Team Championships
Silver medal – second place	2011 Warsaw	Team
Asian Winter Games
Gold medal – first place	2011 Astana-Almaty	1000 m

Song Weilong (simplified Chinese: 宋伟龙; traditional Chinese: 宋偉龍; pinyin: Sòng Wěilóng; born December 9, 1989, in Shenyang, Liaoning) is a Chinese male short track speed skater. He competed at the 2010 Winter Olympics in the 1500m and 5000m relay events.
