= Liu Xianwei =

Chinese speed skater

Personal information
- Born: 22 February 1987 (age 39) China
Medal record
Men's short track speed skating
Representing China
World Championships
Silver medal – second place	2009 Vienna	5000 m relay
World Team Championships
Silver medal – second place	2011 Warsaw	Team
Bronze medal – third place	2010 Bormio	Team

Liu Xianwei (simplified Chinese: 刘显伟; traditional Chinese: 劉顯偉; pinyin: Liú Xiǎnwěi; born February 22, 1987, in Qiqihar, Heilongjiang) is a Chinese male short track speed skater. He competed at the 2010 Winter Olympics in the 1500m and 5000m relay events.
