= François Hamelin =

Canadian short-track speed skater (born 1986)

Personal information
- Born: 18 December 1986 (age 39) Lévis, Quebec, Canada
- Height: 175 cm (5 ft 9 in)
- Weight: 70 kg (154 lb)

Sport
- Country: Canada
- Sport: Short track speed skating
Medal record
Men's short track speed skating
Representing Canada
Olympic Games
Gold medal – first place	2010 Vancouver	5000 m relay
World Championships
Gold medal – first place	2011 Sheffield	5000 m relay
Silver medal – second place	2008 Gangneung	5000 m relay
Silver medal – second place	2010 Sofia	500 m
World Team Championships
Silver medal – second place	2008 Harbin	Team
Silver medal – second place	2009 Heerenveen	Team
Silver medal – second place	2010 Bormio	Team
Bronze medal – third place	2011 Warsaw	Team
World Junior Championships
Silver medal – second place	2006 Miercurea	5000 m relay
Bronze medal – third place	2005 Belgrade	2000 m relay
Bronze medal – third place	2006 Miercurea	1000 m

François Hamelin (French pronunciation: [fʁɑ̃swa amlɛ̃]; born 18 December 1986) is a Canadian former short-track speed skater from Sainte-Julie, Quebec, residing in Montreal. He won Olympic gold in 2010 in Vancouver in the men's 5000 m relay.

He is the younger brother of acclaimed fellow Canadian short tracker Charles Hamelin; their father Yves Hamelin is also the director of the Canadian short track program.

== Career ==
While not having had the same amount of success as his older brother, Hamelin had success at the junior level in international competition. He joined the Canadian national senior team for the 2007–08 season. Hamelin was an important part of the Canadian short track team helping them to both a silver at the 2008 World Championships, and a silver at the 2008 World Team Championships.

=== 2010 Olympics ===
During the 2010 Winter Olympics in Vancouver, Hamelin skated with his brother Charles in the 1000 m short track final, to place fifth. On 26 February, he won a gold medal in the 5000 m relay along with his brother, François-Louis Tremblay, Olivier Jean and Guillaume Bastille.

He also took a silver in the 500 m at the 2010 Worlds, and was part of the Canadian team which won the gold in the 5000 m relay at the 2011 World Championships. He took a total of 48 medals in international competition.

=== 2014 Olympics ===
In the Sochi 2014 Winter Olympics, he finished ninth in the 1500 m and sixth as part of the 5000 m relay team.

=== 2018 Olympics ===
In August 2017, Hamelin was named to Canada's 2018 Winter Olympics team.

In June 2018, Hamelin announced his retirement from competition, having launched his own athlete management agency, Balboa Sports.
