= Olivier Jean =

Canadian short track speed skater (born 1984)

Personal information
- Born: March 15, 1984 (age 42) Lachenaie, Quebec, Canada
- Height: 1.88 m (6 ft 2 in)
- Weight: 80 kg (176 lb)

Sport
- Country: Canada
- Sport: Speed skating

Achievements and titles
- Personal bests: Short track 500m: 40.342 (2012); 1000m: 1:21.815 (2012); 1500m: 2:12.714 (2012); 3000m: 4:45.673 (2012); Long track 500m: 36.47 (2018); 1000m: 1:09.73 (2016); 1500m: 1:46.52 (2016); 3000m: 3:52.49 (2017); 5000m: 6:44.13 (2010); 10000m: 14:00.17 (2010)
Medal record
Representing Canada
Men's speed skating
World Championships
| Bronze medal – third place | 2017 Gangneung | Mass start |
Men's short track speed skating
Olympic Games
| Gold medal – first place | 2010 Vancouver | 5000 m relay |
World Championships
| Gold medal – first place | 2011 Sheffield | 5000 m relay |
| Gold medal – first place | 2012 Shanghai | 500 m |
| Gold medal – first place | 2012 Shanghai | 5000 m relay |
| Gold medal – first place | 2013 Debrecen | 5000 m relay |
| Silver medal – second place | 2007 Milan | 5000 m relay |
| Silver medal – second place | 2011 Sheffield | 500 m |
| Bronze medal – third place | 2009 Vienna | 500 m |
| Bronze medal – third place | 2012 Shanghai | Overall |
World Team Championships
| Silver medal – second place | 2010 Bormio | Team |
| Bronze medal – third place | 2011 Warsaw | Team |
World Junior Championships
| Silver medal – second place | 2002 Chuncheon | 5000 m relay |

Olivier Jean (French pronunciation: [ɔlivje ʒɑ̃]; born March 15, 1984) is a Canadian speed skater. A three-time Olympian in both short and long track speed skating, he won a gold medal at the 2010 Winter Olympics in the men's 5000 m relay.

Initially a short track speed skater, racing internationally from 2002 to 2015, he switched to long track speed skating, competing internationally from 2015 to 2018. Jean competed at his second Olympic Games in 2014 in Sochi in short track speed skating, and for his third Olympic appearance, switched to long track speed skating, competing in the mass start in 2018 in Pyeongchang.

== Career ==
Jean skates in every distance for the Canadian team and is a member of the national short track relay team. He helped the team to a silver at the 2007 World Championships. As well Jean skated to a bronze at the recent 2009 World Championships. Olivier Jean is a member of the Canadian team and relay team in the 2010 Winter Olympics in Vancouver. Jean qualified for the 1500m final on February 13 after judges ruled he was interfered with during his semi-final heat. Jean would go on to finish 4th in the final just missing out on a medal. On February 26, he won a gold medal in the 5000 m relay along with Charles Hamelin, François Hamelin, François-Louis Tremblay and Guillaume Bastille.

At the 2012 World Championships Jean won gold in the 500 m, he followed this with a gold medal in the men's relay final where he skated the anchor leg. He also won his first overall medal at the World Championships when he finished with the bronze.

During the 2011 World Team Championships Jean was the victim of a bizarre sabotage event, when American Simon Cho damaged his skate blade after the United States were already eliminated. This caused the Canadians to be unable to skate for gold, leaving them in the bronze position. The events came to light at an inquiry into the actions of U.S. coach Jae Su Chun in 2012.

At the 2017 World Speed Skating Championships in Gangneung, South Korea Jean won a bronze medal at the mass start event.

Now solely focused on long track speed skating, Jean after finishing in the top 16 in the mass start event at the 2017–18 ISU Speed Skating World Cup, pre-qualified for the 2018 Winter Olympics in Pyeongchang, South Korea.

== Personal life ==
His appearance is well-known for his dreadlocks. Jean listens to reggae, which he says makes him skate faster.
