= Charles Hamelin =

Canadian short-track speed skater (born 1984)

Charles Hamelin OLY
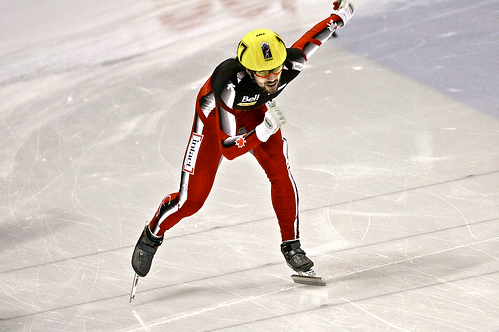
- Hamelin in 2009

Personal information
- Born: April 14, 1984 (age 42) Lévis, Quebec, Canada
- Height: 1.75 m (5 ft 9 in)
- Weight: 71 kg (157 lb)

Sport
- Country: Canada
- Sport: Short track speed skating
- Club: Les Fines Lames de Ste-Julie

Achievements and titles
- Personal bests: 500 m: 40.091 (2016); 1000 m: 1:21.961 (2012); 1500 m: 2:09.098 (2011); 3000 m: 4:38.905 (2002)
Medal record
Men's short track speed skating
Representing Canada
Event	1st	2nd	3rd
Olympic Games	4	1	1
World Championships	14	14	14
World Team Championships	2	4	0
Total	20	19	15
Olympic Games
Gold medal – first place	2010 Vancouver	500 m
Gold medal – first place	2010 Vancouver	5000 m relay
Gold medal – first place	2014 Sochi	1500 m
Gold medal – first place	2022 Beijing	5000 m relay
Silver medal – second place	2006 Turin	5000 m relay
Bronze medal – third place	2018 Pyeongchang	5000 m relay
World Championships
Gold medal – first place	2005 Beijing	5000 m relay
Gold medal – first place	2006 Minneapolis	3000 m
Gold medal – first place	2006 Minneapolis	5000 m relay
Gold medal – first place	2007 Milan	500 m
Gold medal – first place	2009 Vienna	500 m
Gold medal – first place	2011 Sheffield	5000 m relay
Gold medal – first place	2012 Shanghai	5000 m relay
Gold medal – first place	2013 Debrecen	5000 m relay
Gold medal – first place	2014 Montreal	1500 m
Gold medal – first place	2016 Seoul	1000 m
Gold medal – first place	2018 Montreal	Overall
Gold medal – first place	2018 Montreal	1000 m
Gold medal – first place	2018 Montreal	1500 m
Gold medal – first place	2021 Dordrecht	1500 m
Silver medal – second place	2005 Beijing	500 m
Silver medal – second place	2007 Milan	Overall
Silver medal – second place	2007 Milan	1000 m
Silver medal – second place	2007 Milan	5000 m relay
Silver medal – second place	2008 Gangneung	500 m
Silver medal – second place	2008 Gangneung	5000 m relay
Silver medal – second place	2011 Sheffield	Overall
Silver medal – second place	2011 Sheffield	1000m
Silver medal – second place	2011 Sheffield	1500m
Silver medal – second place	2012 Shanghai	500 m
Silver medal – second place	2015 Moscow	1000 m
Silver medal – second place	2016 Seoul	Overall
Silver medal – second place	2016 Seoul	5000 m relay
Silver medal – second place	2018 Montreal	5000 m relay
Bronze medal – third place	2006 Minneapolis	1000 m
Bronze medal – third place	2009 Vienna	Overall
Bronze medal – third place	2009 Vienna	3000 m
Bronze medal – third place	2012 Shanghai	1000 m
Bronze medal – third place	2013 Debrecen	Overall
Bronze medal – third place	2013 Debrecen	1000 m
Bronze medal – third place	2013 Debrecen	1500 m
Bronze medal – third place	2013 Debrecen	3000 m
Bronze medal – third place	2014 Montreal	Overall
Bronze medal – third place	2014 Montreal	500 m
Bronze medal – third place	2015 Moscow	1500 m
Bronze medal – third place	2016 Seoul	3000 m
Bronze medal – third place	2017 Rotterdam	1000 m
Bronze medal – third place	2022 Montreal	5000 m relay
World Team Championships
Gold medal – first place	2005 Chuncheon	Team
Gold medal – first place	2007 Budapest	Team
Silver medal – second place	2006 Montreal	Team
Silver medal – second place	2008 Harbin	Team
Silver medal – second place	2009 Heerenveen	Team
Silver medal – second place	2010 Bormio	Team

Charles Hamelin (French pronunciation: [ʃaʁl amlɛ̃]; born April 14, 1984) is a Canadian retired short-track speed skater. In a competitive career that spanned nearly twenty years on the international circuit, Hamelin participated in five Winter Olympic Games (2006, 2010, 2014, 2018 and 2022) and won six Olympic medals, including a national-best four gold medals. Competing in all distances, he won thirty-eight medals at the World Championships, including fourteen gold medals, and also led Canada to five world relay titles. Hamelin was also the 2014 Overall World Cup season winner and the 2018 Overall World Champion, giving him all the achievements available in the sport.

Hamelin's early success at the 2003 World Junior Championships saw him win silver medals in the 500 m and the 1500 m races and a bronze in the 5000 m relay. After debuting on the senior level, he won two medals at the 2005 World Championships, including his first World gold in the 5000 m relay. In his first Olympics, he finished in fourth place in the 1500 m and won a silver medal as part of the Canadian relay team. He won his first two Olympic gold medals on home ice in Vancouver before picking up two more, the last in his final Olympic appearance in Beijing. Hamelin is the former world record holder in the 1000 m. Dubbed the "Locomotive de Sainte-Julie", Hamelin is widely considered one of Canada's finest athletes.

== Career ==
=== Junior career ===
Hamelin made his debut at the world junior championships in 2002, finishing fourth in the 500 m and helping the relay team to a silver medal. During the next World Junior Championships in 2003, he had his breakout year, finishing second in the 500 m, second in the 1500 m, fourth in the 1000 m, fifth in the super 1500 m, and then helping the relay team to a bronze in the 5000 m relay. Because of his accomplishments in 2003, he finished fourth overall at the world junior championships. He was seemingly following the footsteps of a long line of accomplished French-Canadian short track speedskaters like Marc Gagnon and Éric Bédard.

=== Early senior career and 2006 Winter Olympics ===
Hamelin made his World Cup debut in the 2003–2004 season. His main role on the team at that time was on the relay team, which finished the season second overall. Going into the 2004 World Championships, the Canadian men's relay team was considered one of the favourites but only managed a fourth-place finish.

The 2004–2005 season was a breakout year for Hamelin. This was the first year that he skated every event in the World Cup. He finished third overall in the 500 m, fourth in the 1000 m, fifth in the 1500 m, and fifth overall on the season. He continued to skate on the relay team, which finished first in the final standings. The biggest success of his season would come at the 2005 World Championships, where he managed a silver in the 500 m and two fourth-place finishes in the 1000 m and 3000 m. This allowed him to finish fourth overall in the standings. That year he was also a part of the gold medal-winning Canadian squad at the World Team Championships.

After making his first Canadian Olympic team for the 2006 Winter Olympics, Hamelin managed to qualify for the finals of the 1500 m. In the last lap and a half, he was comfortably in third place before being passed by two Chinese skaters. Although one of the Chinese skaters was disqualified, he still only finished a disappointing fourth. In the relay, the Canadian and Korean teams traded the lead back and forth throughout the race, but the Canadians lost the lead on the last turn but still managed to win silver. The silver medal on the relay was the first Olympic medal in his career.

Following the 2006 Olympics, Hamelin won the gold medal in the 3000 m at the 2006 World Championships. Hamelin would go on to become the 500 m world champion in 2007, over the next three years this would soon be his strongest event. In addition to his 500 m gold, at the 2007 Worlds, he took silvers in the 1000 m and 5000 m relay as well as the overall silver medal. He also took a second gold at the World Team Championships that year. He captured silvers in the 500 m at the worlds and the World Team Championships in 2008, and in 2009, he once again became the 500 m world champion, alongside clinching bronzes in the 3000 m and the overall competition and another World Team silver.

=== 2010 Winter Olympics ===
With the 2010 Winter Olympics taking place in Vancouver, expectations on the Canadian side were high. Hamelin was a medal favourite in the 500, 1000, 1500, and 5000-metre relay. Going into the Olympics, he was the reigning 500 m world champion and reigning World Cup champion. As such Hamelin was the gold medal favourite going into the 2010 Games in his home country.

He began the Vancouver Olympics in the second 1500 m heat, where Hamelin placed second by 0.001 of a second to China's Liang Wenhao. As he only placed second in the heats, Hamelin was drawn into a tough group for the semi-finals, needing to beat one of his two main rivals, Lee Jung-Su or Apolo Ohno, to qualify for the final. Hamelin was in second for much of the race, with Jung-Su in the lead, but on the last lap was passed by Ohno and finished third. Only the top two qualified for the A-Final, and Hamelin was thus relegated to the B-Final, where he finished in first place. When asked about the race, Hamelin said, "it was a really tough field, and I'm not disappointed with the races I had...I'll sleep well tonight".

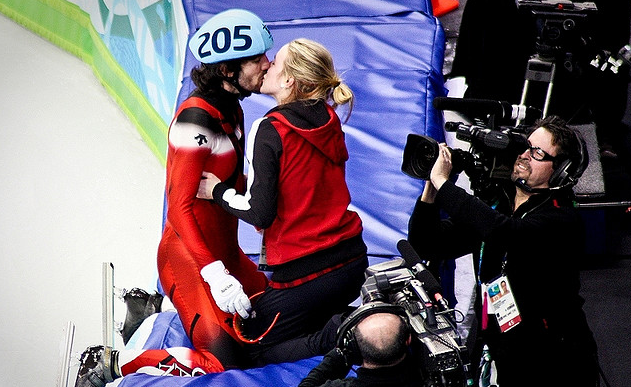
Hamelin kisses former girlfriend and fellow National team speed skater Marianne St-Gelais after winning the gold medal.

During the 1000 m heats, Hamelin placed first, the result duplicating into the quarterfinals. In the semi-finals, Hamelin placed second behind Apolo Ohno and was nearly pushed by Korea's Sung Si-Bak, who trailed him by 0.006 seconds and avoided a disqualification. The final race, which held five skaters, included his younger brother. For three-quarters of the race, he stood in first position in front of François Hamelin and Apolo Ohno, only to be surpassed by Korea's Lee Ho-Suk in the sixth lap. Hamelin fell into third on the following lap, unable to sustain the high speeds much longer. The final lap saw Ohno move to third, leaving Charles and François in fourth and fifth, respectively. During the race the crowd at the Pacific Coliseum was cheering so loudly during the 1,000 m final that Hamelin felt an overwhelming sense of pride like never before, calling it "amazing." Despite the crowd support, Hamelin remained disappointed as he had gone to the Olympics with a mind to win multiple medals.

Next up for Hamelin was his best and most promising event, the 500 m race, Hamelin took the gold medal, with teammate François-Louis Tremblay winning the bronze. It was a close race as the world record holder, Korea's Sung Si-Bak, was in the lead until a slip in the final corner, which allowed Hamelin to pass to finish first. The same night, the Canadian team won the gold in the 5000 m relay. Hamelin shared that gold with his brother François, as well as Tremblay, Olivier Jean and Guillaume Bastille. Of his final and relieving success on the last day of short track at the Olympics, Hamelin said that "they will be going crazy in Quebec, they will be going crazy in Montreal, party all night. I got two gold medals in 30 minutes, and it's incredible."

=== Road to Sochi ===
Following the Vancouver Olympics, Hamelin attended the 2010 World Championships but failed to medal in any event. He won a silver at the 2010 World Team Championships.

Before going into the 2010–11 season, Hamelin said he was using the year to focus on new techniques for 2014 Winter Olympics while not worrying about winning as much during the current season. Hamelin said, "my goal is to try new strategies to make myself more dangerous for 2014...Now it's not to win medals, but to work on things that are difficult mentally – to put myself in situations where I'm not always in control so that even if I'm last, I won't panic and do stupid things." Hamelin was mostly focusing on trying to medal in the longer distances, though he had been dominant in the 500 m the South Koreans continued to own the longer distances, something Hamelin hoped to change. Despite a quiet year on the World Cup, Hamelin finished the 2011 World Championships with a gold in the relay and three silvers, including a second-place overall finish, making progress in his preseason goals.

Hamelin put up decent results through the 2012 season despite several nagging injuries and carried that success into the World Championships. There he won a silver medal in the 500 m trailing teammate Jean who won the gold. He went on to win the bronze in the 1,000 m after being pushed by a Chinese skater. Hamelin was injured in the fall and did not compete in the men's relay final, but he still won gold for his earlier participation in the semi-final.

=== 2014 Winter Olympics ===
As part of his third Canadian Olympic team for the 2014 Winter Olympics in Sochi, Hamelin reached the final of the 1500m while his brother made the B final of the same event. He started the race, pushed to the front of the seven-man pack, and retained that lead for most of the race. Towards the end of the race, Hamelin's lead was challenged by both China's Han Tianyu and Russia's Viktor Ahn, but Hamelin passed Han and held on to win the gold medal as Canada's second gold medal of the Sochi Olympics. The 1,500 m was often identified as a weakness for Hamelin and the Canadians. He was proud of the gold in the event, saying, "it is the best I can dream of, coming in the Olympics and having that gold in the 1,500-metre. We always said in the last few years that it was our weakness, but I really worked hard to prove everyone wrong, and I think today was the day." He had a strong overall season. and won his first overall World Cup title after coming close several times previously.

=== 2018 Winter Olympics ===
In August 2017, Hamelin was named to Canada's 2018 Winter Olympics team, his fourth. The individual events in Pyeongchang proved a disappointment for Hamelin, as penalties knocked him out of the 500 and 1000 m in the early rounds, and he also took a penalty in the 1500 m final. He concluded the Games in the 5000 m relay, where the Canadian team won bronze, his fifth Olympic medal.

He rebounded from the disappointing Olympics to win his first ever World Championship overall title, taking gold in the 1000 m and 1500 m events and silver in the men's relay on home ice in Montreal, after several near misses previously. He was the first Canadian man since Marc Gagnon twenty years earlier to win the Overall World Championship. Hamelin had been widely expected to retire following the 2017–18 season but surprised many by announcing that he intended to continue for at least another year.

=== Pandemic seasons and 2022 Winter Olympics ===
Having postponed his presumed retirement for a year, Hamelin announced in 2019 that he would continue to the 2022 Winter Olympics. His decision was influenced by the unexpected retirement of Samuel Girard after the 2018–19 season, as Girard, a gold medalist in Pyeongchang and part of the bronze medal-winning relay team had been widely seen as Hamelin's heir.

The onset of the COVID-19 pandemic resulted in the cancellation of many events in the second half of the quadrennial and greatly complicated Hamelin's training. While missing almost a year of on-ice training, they improvised other methods to stay in form while largely training separately. In his return to major international championships, he took the gold medal in the 1500 m at the 2021 World Championships in Dordrecht.

In January 2022, Hamelin was named to his fifth and final Olympic team. As well, Hamelin along with hockey player Marie-Philip Poulin were named as Canada's flagbearers during the opening ceremony. Hamelin competed in only one individual event in Beijing, that being the 1500 m, in which he was the reigning world champion. He was disqualified for an illegal lane change in the semi-final, while teammate Steven Dubois won the silver medal. The final Olympic event of Hamelin's career was to be the 5000 m relay event, where the Canadian team would win the gold medal. This was Hamelin's fourth gold and sixth medal, the former tying a record set by women's hockey players Jayna Hefford, Caroline Ouellette, and Hayley Wickenheiser for the most gold medals for a Canadian Olympian. He said afterward that it "was a difficult decision to continue training over the past four years for my fifth Olympics, but I believed in myself. It was a challenge to keep myself competitive against the world, but I did it." He considered it the finest win of his career.

Following the Olympics, the 2022 World Championships, held in Montreal, were expected to be the final event of Hamelin's competitive career. He focused on the relay event, saying, "hopefully, we'll come back with the gold medal like we did at the Olympics. I love what I do, and that's the reason why I'm still here." The Canadian team finished narrowly third, taking the bronze medal, the thirty-eighth and final World Championship medal of Hamelin's career.

== Personal life ==
Short track is a family affair for Hamelin: his brother François Hamelin is a fellow Olympian and national short track member. The former director of the national short track team is his father, Yves Hamelin. Hamelin made Hello! Canada's 50 most beautiful Canadians list in 2010, along with his then-girlfriend, fellow speed skater and Olympian Marianne St-Gelais. In March 2018, after ten years as a couple, Hamelin and St-Gelais announced in a statement that they were splitting up.

He is presently engaged to sports journalist Geneviève Tardif, with whom he shares a daughter, Violette, born on April 23, 2020. The two were engaged in the summer of 2019, and were due to wed in 2020, but delayed their ceremony twice due to the COVID-19 pandemic.

Olympic Games
Preceded by Miranda Ayim; Nathan Hirayama	Flagbearer for Canada; 2022 Beijing (with Marie-Philip Poulin)	Succeeded by Maude Charron; Andre De Grasse
