= Short-track speed skating at the 2014 Winter Olympics – Women's 1500 metres =

Women's 1500 metres at the XXII Olympic Winter Games
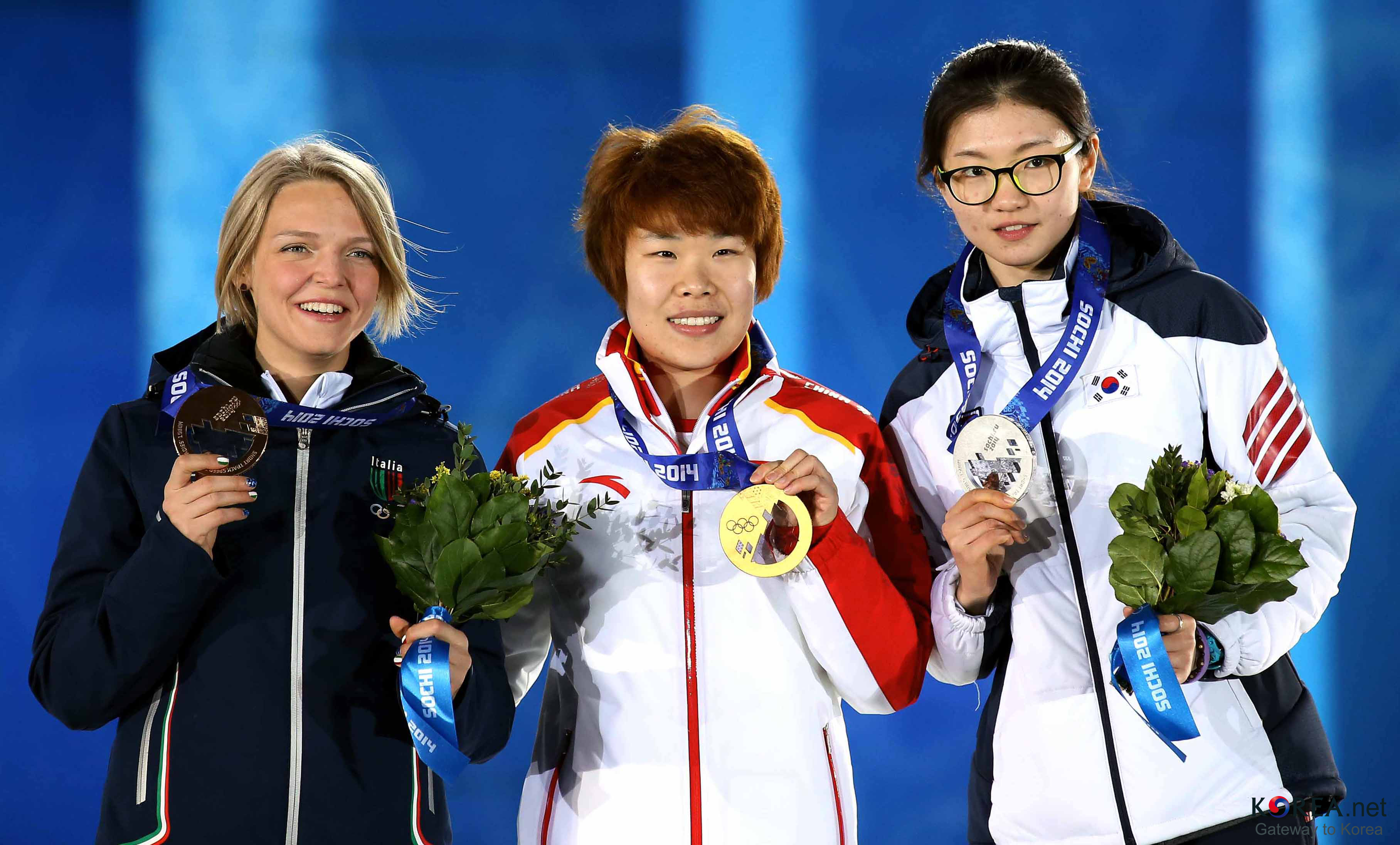
- Podium
- Venue: Iceberg Skating Palace; Sochi, Russia
- Dates: 15 February 2014 (qualifying heats, semifinal, and final)
- Competitors: 36 from 19 nations
- Winning time: 2:19.140

Medalists
1st place, gold medalist(s)		Zhou Yang	China
2nd place, silver medalist(s)		Shim Suk-hee	South Korea
3rd place, bronze medalist(s)		Arianna Fontana	Italy

The women's 1500 metres in short track speed skating at the 2014 Winter Olympics was held on 15 February 2014 at the Iceberg Skating Palace in Sochi, Russia.

The qualifying heats, semifinal and the final were held on 15 February.

The defending Olympic Champion is Zhou Yang of China, while the defending World Champion is Park Seung-hi of South Korea.

== Qualification ==
Countries were assigned quotas using a combination of the four special Olympic Qualification classifications that were held at two world cups in November 2013. A nation may enter a maximum of three athletes per event. For this event a total of 36 athletes representing 19 nations qualified to compete.

== Results ==
The results are:

=== Heats ===
Q – qualified for Quarterfinals
ADV – advanced
PEN – penalty

Rank	Heat	Name	Country	Time	Notes
1	1	Shim Suk-hee	South Korea	2:24.765	Q
2	1	Marie-Ève Drolet	Canada	2:24.859	Q
3	1	Anna Seidel	Germany	2:25.700	Q
4	1	Martina Valcepina	Italy	2:27.212	
5	1	Véronique Pierron	France	2:55.658	ADV
–	1	Valeriya Reznik	Russia		PEN
1	2	Arianna Fontana	Italy	2:29.645	Q
2	2	Olga Belyakova	Russia	2:29.880	Q
3	2	Ayuko Ito	Japan	2:30.354	Q
4	2	Inna Simonova	Kazakhstan	2:30.499	
5	2	Tatiana Bodova	Slovakia	2:31.788	
–	2	Elise Christie	Great Britain		DNF
1	3	Cho Ha-ri	South Korea	2:27.629	Q
2	3	Valérie Maltais	Canada	2:27.721	Q
3	3	Li Jianrou	China	2:27.758	Q
4	3	Alyson Dudek	United States	2:27.899	
5	3	Charlotte Gilmartin	Great Britain	2:27.935	
6	3	Biba Sakurai	Japan	2:28.127	
1	4	Jorien ter Mors	Netherlands	2:21.626	Q
2	4	Bernadett Heidum	Hungary	2:21.826	Q
3	4	Agnė Sereikaitė	Lithuania	2:21.900	Q
4	4	Lucia Peretti	Italy	2:22.953	
5	4	Deanna Lockett	Australia	2:25.140	
6	4	Volha Talayeva	Belarus	2:27.817	
1	5	Zhou Yang	China	2:26.543	Q
2	5	Jessica Smith	United States	2:26.703	Q
3	5	Yara van Kerkhof	Netherlands	2:26.809	Q
4	5	Marianne St-Gelais	Canada	2:27.071	
5	5	Yui Sakai	Japan	2:27.198	
6	5	Kateřina Novotná	Czech Republic	2:27.232	
1	6	Emily Scott	United States	2:22.641	Q
2	6	Kim A-lang	South Korea	2:22.864	Q
3	6	Veronika Windisch	Austria	2:23.042	Q
4	6	Liu Qiuhong	China	2:24.640	
5	6	Zsófia Kónya	Hungary	2:55.523	
–	6	Tatiana Borodulina	Russia		DNF

=== Semifinals ===
QA – qualified for Finals A
QB – qualified for Finals B
ADV – advanced
PEN – penalty

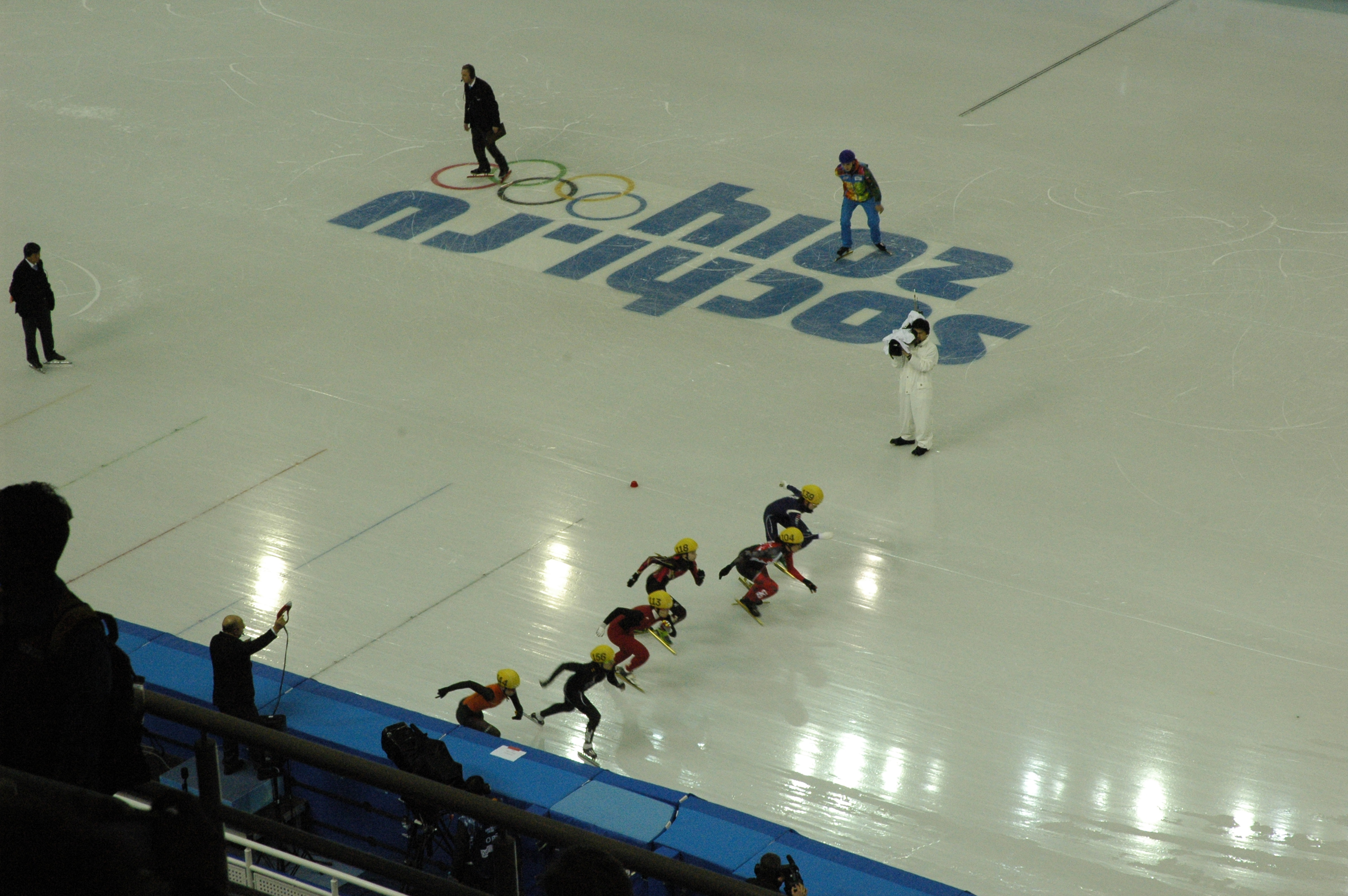
Semifinal 1

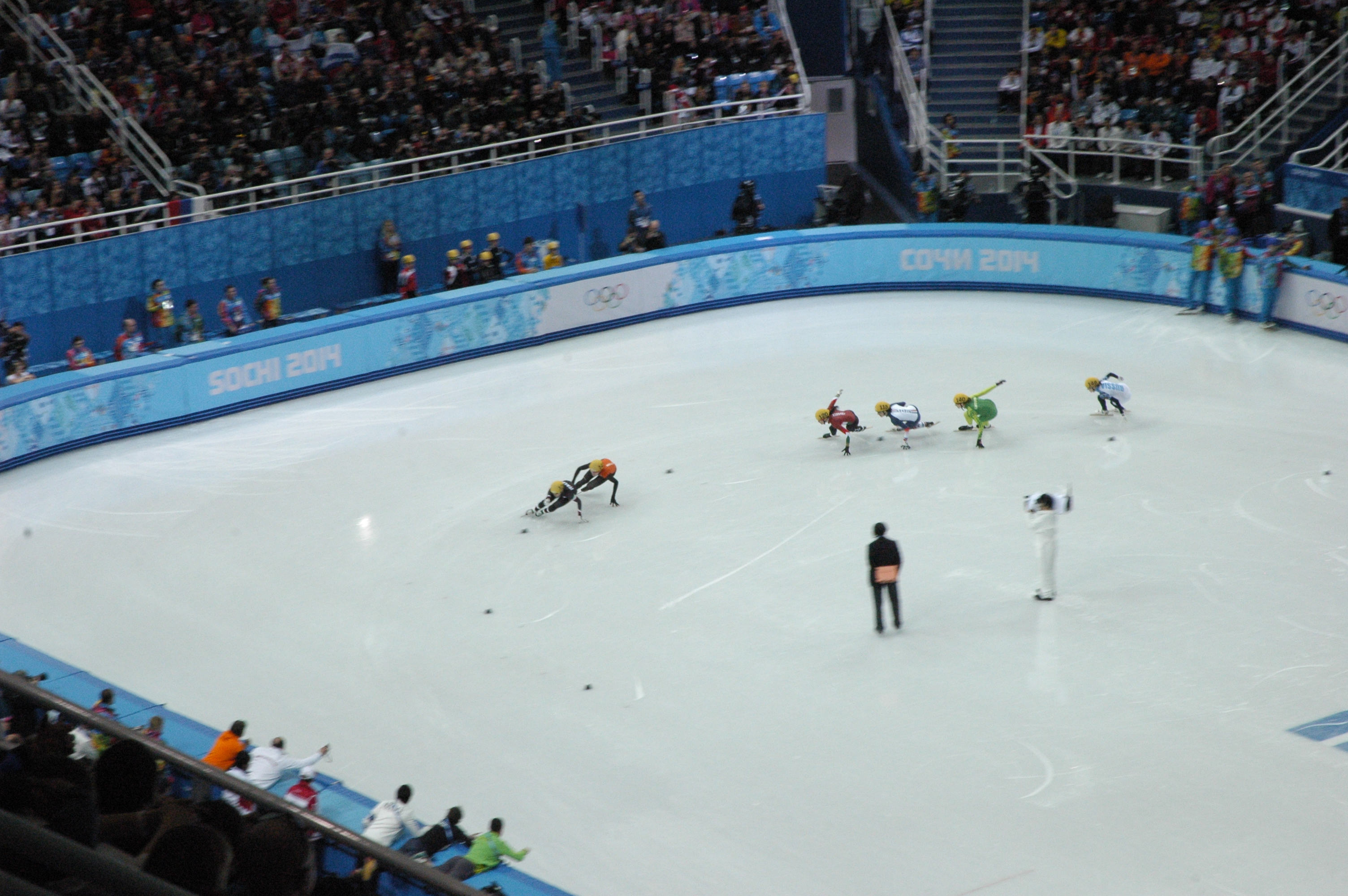
Semifinal 2

Rank	Heat	Name	Country	Time	Notes
1	1	Zhou Yang	China	2:18.825	QA
2	1	Shim Suk-hee	South Korea	2:18.966	QA
3	1	Marie-Ève Drolet	Canada	2:19.516	QB
4	1	Jessica Smith	United States	2:20.259	QB
5	1	Yara van Kerkhof	Netherlands	2:20.291	
6	1	Anna Seidel	Germany	2:20.405	
1	2	Arianna Fontana	Italy	2:19.336	QA
2	2	Jorien ter Mors	Netherlands	2:19.382	QA
3	2	Bernadett Heidum	Hungary	2:20.196	QB
4	2	Véronique Pierron	France	2:20.216	QB
5	2	Olga Belyakova	Russia	2:20.391	
6	2	Agnė Sereikaitė	Lithuania	2:20.398	
7	2	Ayuko Ito	Japan	2:56.961	
1	3	Li Jianrou	China	2:22.866	QA
2	3	Kim A-lang	South Korea	2:22.928	QA
3	3	Valérie Maltais	Canada	2:23.069	QB
4	3	Veronika Windisch	Austria	2:23.241	QB
5	3	Emily Scott	United States	2:23.439	ADV
–	3	Cho Ha-ri	South Korea		PEN

=== Finals ===
==== Final B (classification round) ====
Rank	Name	Country	Time	Notes
6	Valérie Maltais	Canada	2:24.711	
7	Jessica Smith	United States	2:25.787	
8	Marie-Ève Drolet	Canada	2:25.870	
9	Bernadett Heidum	Hungary	2:26.004	
10	Véronique Pierron	France	2:26.066	
11	Veronika Windisch	Austria	2:26.296	

==== Final A (medal round) ====
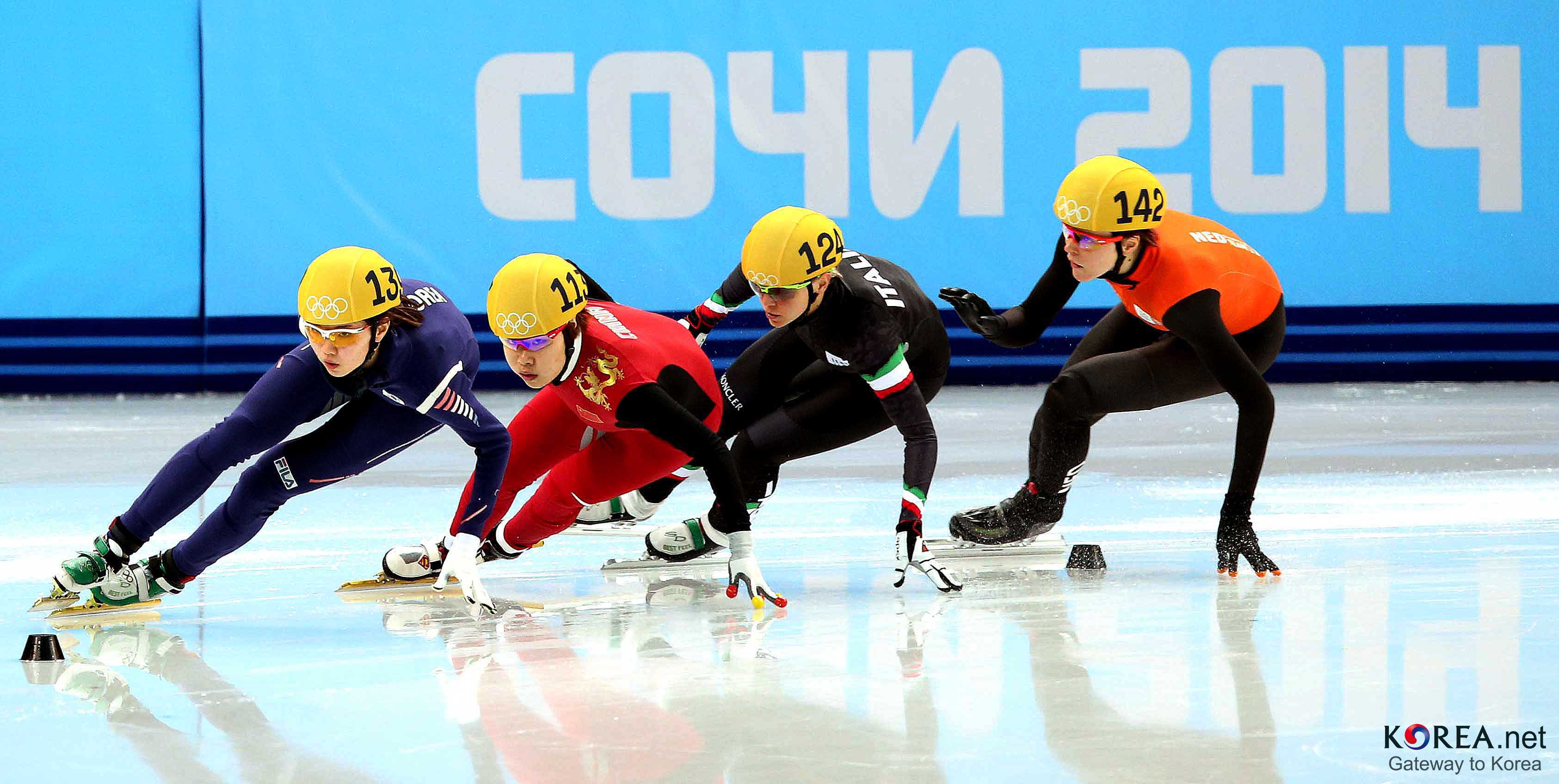
Final A

Rank	Name	Country	Time	Notes
1st place, gold medalist(s)	Zhou Yang	China	2:19.140	
2nd place, silver medalist(s)	Shim Suk-hee	South Korea	2:19.239	
3rd place, bronze medalist(s)	Arianna Fontana	Italy	2:19.416	
4	Jorien ter Mors	Netherlands	2:19.656	
5	Emily Scott	United States	2:39.436	
–	Li Jianrou	China		DNF
–	Kim A-lang	South Korea		PEN

== Final standings ==
The final overall standings were:

Rank	Name	Country
1st place, gold medalist(s)	Zhou Yang	China
2nd place, silver medalist(s)	Shim Suk-hee	South Korea
3rd place, bronze medalist(s)	Arianna Fontana	Italy
4	Jorien ter Mors	Netherlands
5	Emily Scott	United States
6	Valérie Maltais	Canada
7	Jessica Smith	United States
8	Marie-Ève Drolet	Canada
9	Bernadett Heidum	Hungary
10	Véronique Pierron	France
11	Veronika Windisch	Austria
12	Li Jianrou	China
13	Kim A-lang	South Korea
14	Olga Belyakova	Russia
15	Yara van Kerkhof	Netherlands
16	Agnė Sereikaitė	Lithuania
17	Anna Seidel	Germany
18	Ayuko Ito	Japan
19	Cho Ha-ri	South Korea
20	Lucia Peretti	Italy
21	Liu Qiuhong	China
22	Marianne St-Gelais	Canada
23	Martina Valcepina	Italy
24	Alyson Dudek	United States
25	Inna Simonova	Kazakhstan
26	Deanna Lockett	Australia
27	Yui Sakai	Japan
28	Charlotte Gilmartin	Great Britain
29	Tatiana Bodova	Slovakia
30	Zsófia Kónya	Hungary
31	Kateřina Novotná	Czech Republic
32	Volha Talayeva	Belarus
33	Biba Sakurai	Japan
–	Elise Christie	Great Britain
–	Tatiana Borodulina	Russia
–	Valeriya Reznik	Russia
