= Short-track speed skating at the 2014 Winter Olympics – Women's 1000 metres =

Women's 1000 metres at the XXII Olympic Winter Games
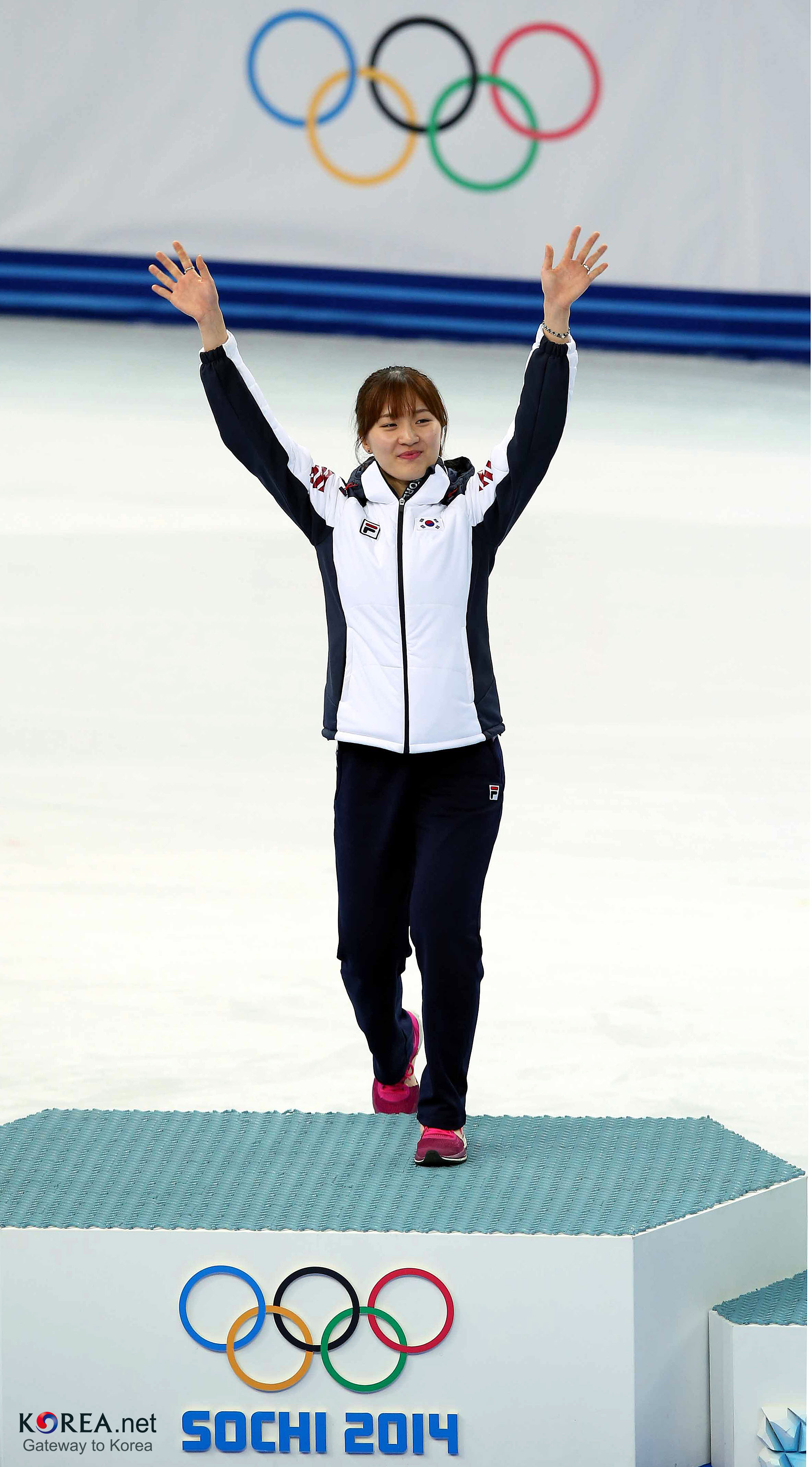
- Podium
- Venue: Iceberg Skating Palace; Sochi, Russia
- Dates: 18 February 2014 (qualifying heats); 21 February 2014 (quarterfinal, semifinal, and final)
- Competitors: 32 from 18 nations
- Winning time: 1:30.761

Medalists
| 1st place, gold medalist(s) | | Park Seung-hi | South Korea |
| 2nd place, silver medalist(s) | | Fan Kexin | China |
| 3rd place, bronze medalist(s) | | Shim Suk-hee | South Korea |

The women's 1000 metres in short track speed skating at the 2014 Winter Olympics was held between 18 and 21 February 2014 at the Iceberg Skating Palace in Sochi, Russia.

The qualifying heats was held on 18 February with the quarterfinal, the semifinal and the final on 21 February.

The defending Olympic Champion and World Champion is Wang Meng of China. Meng qualified to compete at the Games but broke her ankle in a collision with a teammate while practicing for the games in January 2014.

== Qualification ==
Countries were assigned quotas using a combination of the four special Olympic Qualification classifications that were held at two world cups in November 2013. A nation may enter a maximum of three athletes per event. For this event a total of 32 athletes representing 18 nations qualified to compete.

== Results ==
The event was started at 20:44.

=== Preliminaries ===
==== Heats ====
Q – qualified for Quarterfinals
ADV – advanced
PEN – penalty

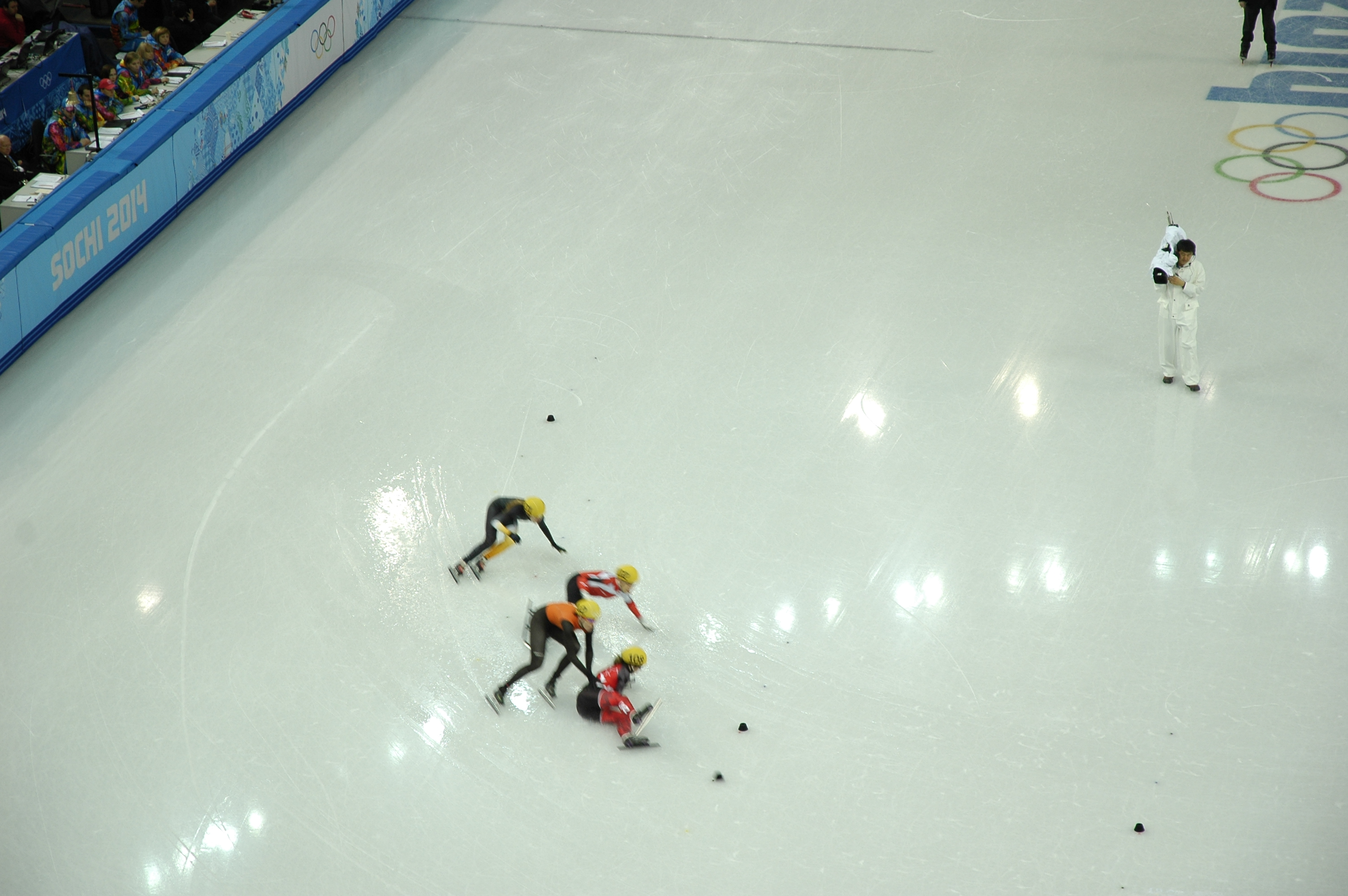
Crash in heat 8

| Rank | Heat | Name | Country | Time | Notes |
|---|---|---|---|---|---|
| 1 | 1 | Li Jianrou | China | 1:31.187 | Q |
| 2 | 1 | Jessica Smith | United States | 1:31.359 | Q |
| 3 | 1 | Tatiana Borodulina | Russia | 1:31.559 | |
| 4 | 1 | Sayuri Shimizu | Japan | 1:31.879 | |
| 1 | 2 | Park Seung-hi | South Korea | 1:31.883 | Q |
| 2 | 2 | Emily Scott | United States | 1:32.585 | Q |
| 3 | 2 | Inna Simonova | Kazakhstan | 1:32.599 | |
| – | 2 | Kateřina Novotná | Czech Republic | | PEN |
| 1 | 3 | Valérie Maltais | Canada | 1:28.771 | Q, OR |
| 2 | 3 | Yui Sakai | Japan | 1:29.824 | Q |
| 3 | 3 | Yara van Kerkhof | Netherlands | 1:29.980 | |
| 4 | 3 | Sofiya Vlasova | Ukraine | 1:32.495 | |
| 1 | 4 | Shim Suk-hee | South Korea | 1:31.046 | Q |
| 2 | 4 | Marie-Ève Drolet | Canada | 1:31.273 | Q |
| 3 | 4 | Martina Valcepina | Italy | 1:34.226 | ADV |
| – | 4 | Liu Qiuhong | China | | PEN |
| 1 | 5 | Kim A-lang | South Korea | 1:31.640 | Q |
| 2 | 5 | Fan Kexin | China | 1:31.713 | Q |
| 3 | 5 | Olga Belyakova | Russia | 1:32.034 | |
| – | 5 | Agnė Sereikaitė | Lithuania | | PEN |
| 1 | 6 | Arianna Fontana | Italy | 1:32.983 | Q |
| 2 | 6 | Véronique Pierron | France | 1:33.022 | Q |
| 3 | 6 | Sofia Prosvirnova | Russia | 1:36.521 | |
| – | 6 | Bernadett Heidum | Hungary | | PEN |
| 1 | 7 | Elise Christie | Great Britain | 1:30.588 | Q |
| 2 | 7 | Patrycja Maliszewska | Poland | 1:32.975 | Q |
| 3 | 7 | Ayuko Ito | Japan | 1:33.188 | |
| 4 | 7 | Elena Viviani | Italy | 1:33.352 | |
| 1 | 8 | Deanna Lockett | Australia | 1:34.845 | Q |
| 2 | 8 | Veronika Windisch | Austria | 1:36.018 | Q |
| 3 | 8 | Jorien ter Mors | Netherlands | 1:46.661 | ADV |
| 4 | 8 | Marianne St-Gelais | Canada | 2:05.206 | |

==== Quarterfinal ====
Q – qualified for Semifinals
ADV – advanced
PEN – penalty

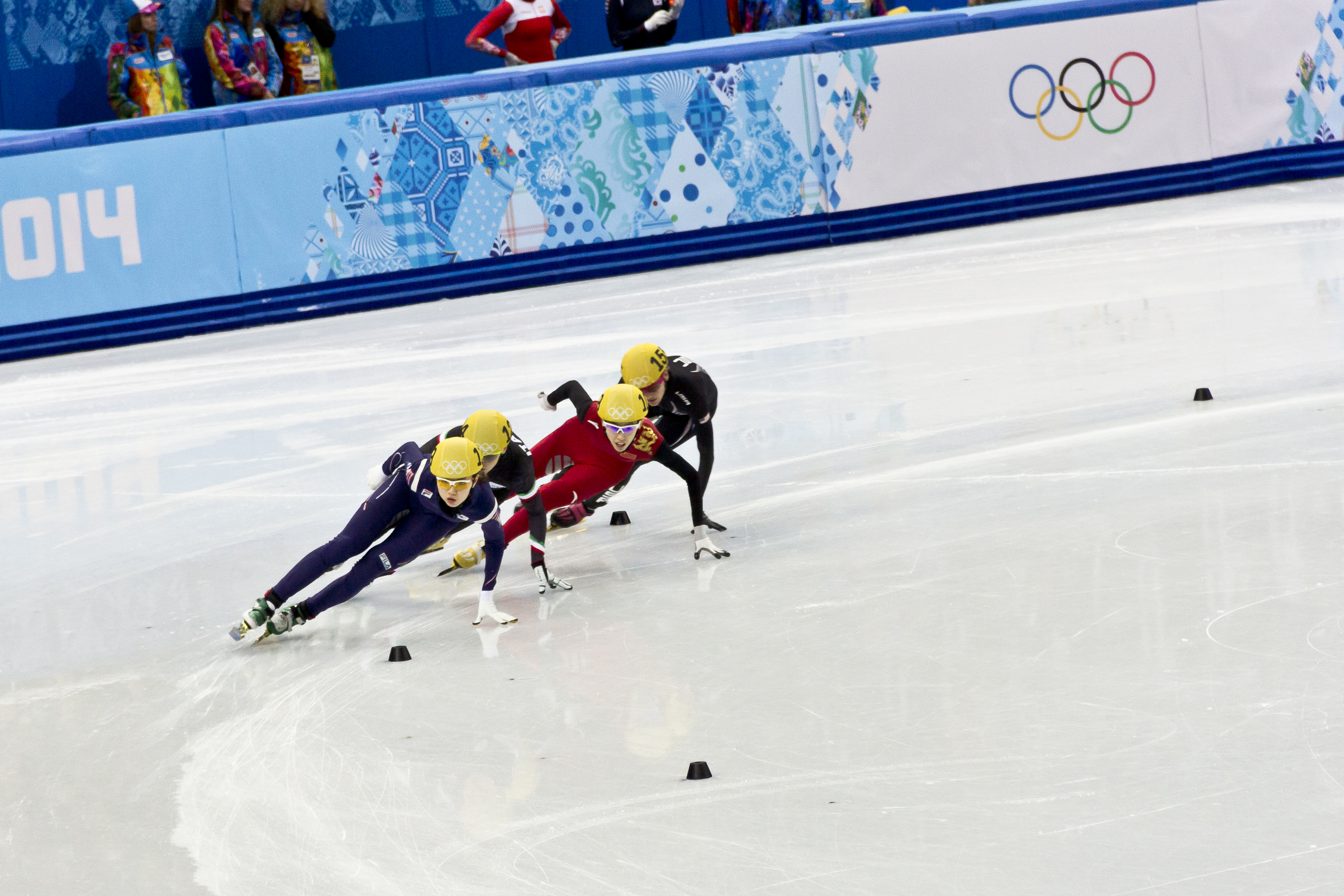
Quarterfinal 3

| Rank | Quarterfinal | Name | Country | Time | Notes |
|---|---|---|---|---|---|
| 1 | 1 | Elise Christie | Great Britain | 1:30.606 | Q |
| 2 | 1 | Park Seung-hi | South Korea | 1:30.801 | Q |
| 3 | 1 | Marie-Ève Drolet | Canada | 1:31.668 | |
| – | 1 | Veronique Pierron | France | | PEN |
| 1 | 2 | Valérie Maltais | Canada | 1:29.037 | Q |
| 2 | 2 | Jorien ter Mors | Netherlands | 1:29.119 | Q |
| 3 | 2 | Deanna Lockett | Australia | 1:29.256 | |
| 4 | 2 | Yui Sakai | Japan | 1:29.328 | |
| 5 | 2 | Veronika Windisch | Austria | 1:30.017 | |
| 1 | 3 | Shim Suk-hee | South Korea | 1:29.356 | Q |
| 2 | 3 | Fan Kexin | China | 1:29.380 | Q |
| 3 | 3 | Emily Scott | United States | 1:30.324 | |
| – | 3 | Arianna Fontana | Italy | | PEN |
| 1 | 4 | Jessica Smith | United States | 1:32.088 | Q |
| 2 | 4 | Li Jianrou | China | 1:32.129 | Q |
| 3 | 4 | Kim A-lang | South Korea | 1:32.154 | |
| 4 | 4 | Patrycja Maliszewska | Poland | 1:32.376 | |

==== Semifinals ====
| Rank | Semifinal | Name | Country | Time | Notes |
|---|---|---|---|---|---|
| 1 | 1 | Park Seung-hi | South Korea | 1:30:202 | QA |
| 2 | 1 | Jessica Smith | United States | 1:30:409 | QA |
| 3 | 1 | Jorien ter Mors | Netherlands | 1:30:481 | QB |
| 4 | 1 | Valérie Maltais | Canada | 1:56:511 | QB |
| 1 | 2 | Shim Suk-hee | South Korea | 1:31.237 | QA |
| 2 | 2 | Fan Kexin | China | 1:32.618 | QA |
| – | 2 | Li Jianrou | China | | PEN |
| – | 2 | Elise Christie | Great Britain | | PEN |

=== Finals ===
==== Final B (classification round) ====
| Rank | Name | Country | Time | Notes |
|---|---|---|---|---|
| 5 | Jorien ter Mors | Netherlands | 1:36.835 | |
| 6 | Valérie Maltais | Canada | 1:36.863 | |

==== Final A (medal round) ====
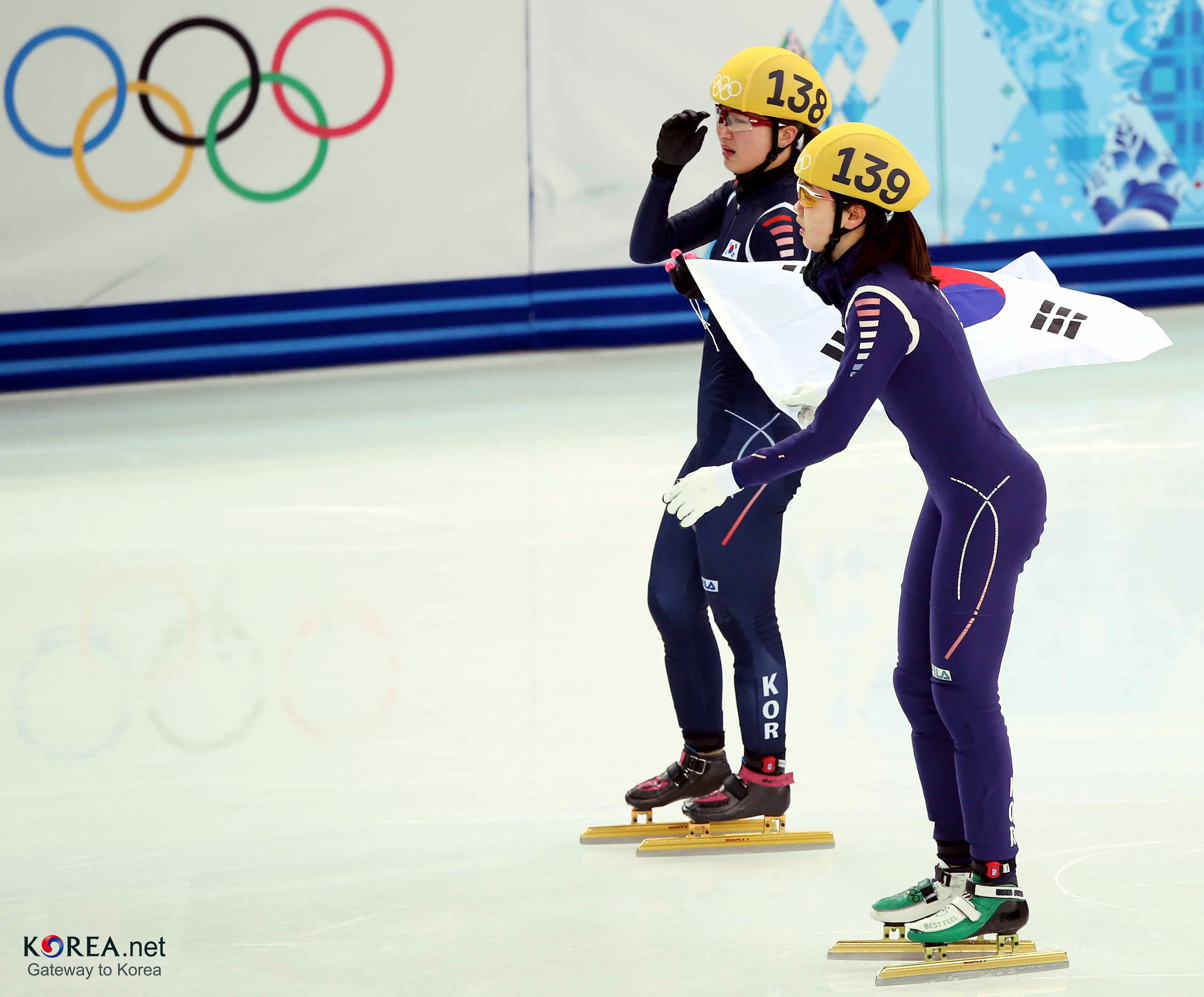
South Korea celebrating their gold and bronze medal

| Rank | Name | Country | Time | Notes |
|---|---|---|---|---|
| 1st place, gold medalist(s) | Park Seung-hi | South Korea | 1:30.761 | |
| 2nd place, silver medalist(s) | Fan Kexin | China | 1:30.811 | |
| 3rd place, bronze medalist(s) | Shim Suk-hee | South Korea | 1:31.027 | |
| 4 | Jessica Smith | United States | 1:31.301 | |
