= Short-track speed skating at the 2014 Winter Olympics – Women's 500 metres =

Women's 500 metres at the XXII Olympic Winter Games
- Pictogram for short track
- Venue: Iceberg Skating Palace; Sochi, Russia
- Dates: 10 February 2014 (qualifying heats); 13 February 2014 (quarterfinal, semifinal, and final)
- Competitors: 32 from 15 nations
- Winning time: 45.263

Medalists
1st place, gold medalist(s)		Li Jianrou	China
2nd place, silver medalist(s)		Arianna Fontana	Italy
3rd place, bronze medalist(s)		Park Seung-hi	South Korea

The women's 500 metres in short track speed skating at the 2014 Winter Olympics was held between 10–13 February 2014 at the Iceberg Skating Palace in Sochi, Russia.

The qualifying heats was held on 10 February with the quarterfinal, the semifinal and the final were held on 13 February.

The defending Olympic Champion and World Champion is Wang Meng of China. Meng qualified to compete at the Games but broke her ankle in a collision with a teammate while practicing for the games in January 2014.

== Qualification ==
Countries were assigned quotas using a combination of the four special Olympic Qualification classifications that were held at two world cups in November 2013. A nation may enter a maximum of three athletes per event. For this event a total of 32 athletes representing 15 nations qualified to compete.

== Results ==
The final results:

=== Preliminaries ===
==== Heats ====
Q – qualified for Quarterfinals
ADV — advanced
PEN — penalty
YC — yellow card

Rank	Heat	Name	Country	Time	Notes
1	1	Liu Qiuhong	China	43.542	Q
2	1	Kim A-lang	South Korea	43.919	Q
3	1	Lara van Ruijven	Netherlands	44.023	
–	1	Tatiana Borodulina	Russia		PEN
1	2	Elise Christie	Great Britain	44.775	Q
2	2	Sofia Prosvirnova	Russia	44.940	Q
3	2	Yui Sakai	Japan	45.051	
4	2	Andrea Keszler	Hungary	45.215	
1	3	Jorien ter Mors	Netherlands	44.262	Q
2	3	Charlotte Gilmartin	Great Britain	44.440	Q
3	3	Martina Valcepina	Italy	44.493	
4	3	Biba Sakurai	Japan	44.628	
1	4	Park Seung-hi	South Korea	44.180	Q
2	4	Emily Scott	United States	45.210	Q
3	4	Agnė Sereikaitė	Lithuania	45.356	
4	4	Véronique Pierron	France	1:12.278	
1	5	Marianne St-Gelais	Canada	43.729	Q
2	5	Yara van Kerkhof	Netherlands	44.044	Q
3	5	Ayuko Ito	Japan	44.174	
4	5	Inna Simonova	Kazakhstan	44.387	
1	6	Arianna Fontana	Italy	43.568	Q
2	6	Li Jianrou	China	43.633	Q
3	6	Patrycja Maliszewska	Poland	44.154	
–	6	Alyson Dudek	United States		PEN
1	7	Fan Kexin	China	43.356	Q
2	7	Jessica Hewitt	Canada	43.447	Q
3	7	Valeriya Reznik	Russia	45.349	
4	7	Jessica Smith	United States	1:13.344	
1	8	Valérie Maltais	Canada	44.093	Q
2	8	Shim Suk-hee	South Korea	44.197	Q
3	8	Veronika Windisch	Austria	44.586	
4	8	Elena Viviani	Italy	44.623	

==== Quarterfinal ====
Q – qualified for the semifinals
ADV – advanced
PEN – penalty
YC – yellow card

Rank	Quarterfinal	Name	Country	Time	Notes
1	1	Park Seung-hi	South Korea	43.392	Q
2	1	Marianne St-Gelais	Canada	43.595	Q
3	1	Yara van Kerkhof	Netherlands	43.888	
4	1	Charlotte Gilmartin	Great Britain	44.279	
1	2	Fan Kexin	China	43.288	Q
2	2	Elise Christie	Great Britain	43.402	Q
3	2	Emily Scott	United States	44.709	
4	2	Jessica Hewitt	Canada	1:00.971	
1	3	Liu Qiuhong	China	43.478	Q
2	3	Jorien ter Mors	Netherlands	43.572	Q
3	3	Kim A-lang	South Korea	43.673	
4	3	Sofia Prosvirnova	Russia	43.862	
1	4	Arianna Fontana	Italy	43.405	Q
2	4	Li Jianrou	China	43.486	Q
3	4	Valérie Maltais	Canada	43.550	
4	4	Shim Suk-Hee	South Korea	43.572	

==== Semifinals ====
QA – qualified for Final A
QB – qualified for Final B
ADV – advanced
PEN – penalty
YC – yellow card

Rank	Semifinal	Name	Country	Time	Notes
1	1	Park Seung-hi	South Korea	43.611	QA
2	1	Arianna Fontana	Italy	43.624	QA
3	1	Marianne St-Gelais	Canada	44.069	QB
4	1	Jorien ter Mors	Netherlands	44.242	QB
1	2	Elise Christie	Great Britain	43.837	QA
2	2	Li Jianrou	China	43.841	QA
3	2	Liu Qiuhong	China	43.916	QB
4	2	Fan Kexin	China	1:24.431	QB

=== Finals ===
==== Final B (classification round) ====
Rank	Name	Country	Time	Notes
4	Liu Qiuhong	China	44.188	
5	Fan Kexin	China	44.297	
6	Jorien ter Mors	Netherlands	44.311	
7	Marianne St-Gelais	Canada	44.359	

==== Final A (medal round) ====
Rank	Name	Country	Time	Notes
1st place, gold medalist(s)	Li Jianrou	China	45.263	
2nd place, silver medalist(s)	Arianna Fontana	Italy	51.250	
3rd place, bronze medalist(s)	Park Seung-hi	South Korea	54.207	
–	Elise Christie	Great Britain		PEN

== Final standings ==
The final overall standings were:

Rank	Name	Country
1st place, gold medalist(s)	Li Jianrou	China
2nd place, silver medalist(s)	Arianna Fontana	Italy
3rd place, bronze medalist(s)	Park Seung-hi	South Korea
4	Liu Qiuhong	China
5	Fan Kexin	China
6	Jorien ter Mors	Netherlands
7	Marianne St-Gelais	Canada
8	Elise Christie	Great Britain
9	Valérie Maltais	Canada
10	Kim A-lang	South Korea
11	Yara van Kerkhof	Netherlands
12	Emily Scott	United States
13	Jessica Hewitt	Canada
14	Shim Suk-hee	South Korea
15	Sofia Prosvirnova	Russia
16	Charlotte Gilmartin	Great Britain
17	Lara van Ruijven	Netherlands
18	Patrycja Maliszewska	Poland
19	Ayuko Ito	Japan
20	Martina Valcepina	Italy
21	Veronika Windisch	Austria
22	Yui Sakai	Japan
23	Valeriya Reznik	Russia
24	Agnė Sereikaitė	Lithuania
25	Inna Simonova	Kazakhstan
26	Elena Viviani	Italy
27	Biba Sakurai	Japan
28	Andrea Keszler	Hungary
29	Véronique Pierron	France
30	Jessica Smith	United States
–	Tatiana Borodulina	Russia
–	Alyson Dudek	United States
