= 2011 World Junior Short Track Speed Skating Championships – Women's 1500 metres =

The Women's 1500 metres at the 2011 World Junior Short Track Speed Skating Championships will be held on February 25 at the Forum Sport Center ice rink.

== Results ==
=== Heats ===
Top 3 Athletes from each heat qualify for Quarterfinals.

Heat 1

Rank	Athlete	Country	Time	Notes
1	Ekaterina Baranok	Russia	2:37.496	Q
2	Ann Veronique Michaud	Canada	2:37.559	Q
3	Hsiao-Ying Chung	Chinese Taipei	2:38.106	Q
4	Sinead Fogarty	Australia	2:38.787	
5	Zornica Pencheva	Bulgaria	2:45.225	

Heat 3

Rank	Athlete	Country	Time	Notes
1	Deanna Lockett	Australia	2:40.411	Q
2	Arianna Valcepina	Italy	2:40.683	Q
3	Anastassiya Krestova	Kazakhstan	2:41.626	Q
4	Natallia Tsaluika	Belarus	2:48.194	
5	Lilia Dzhustrova	Bulgaria	3:08.222	ADV
6	Fumi Kitabuki	Japan		DSQ

Heat 5

Rank	Athlete	Country	Time	Notes
1	Laurie Marceau	Canada	2:38.957	Q
2	Katherine Ralston	United States	2:39.309	Q
3	Marta Wojcik	Poland	2:40.341	Q
4	Sara Blekic	Croatia	2:41.833	
5	Ilze Urtane	Latvia		DSQ

Heat 7

Rank	Athlete	Country	Time	Notes
1	Se Jung Ahn	South Korea	2:38.192	Q
2	Patricia Toth	Hungary	2:38.659	Q
3	Safiya Vlasova	Ukraine	2:39.000	Q
4	Dariya Volokitina	Kazakhstan	2:39.607	
5	Josipa Tadic	Croatia	2:56.628	
6	Lenka Zahumenska	Czech Republic		DSQ

Heat 9

Rank	Athlete	Country	Time	Notes
1	Agne Sereikaite	Lithuania	2:38.854	Q
2	Evgeniya Zakharova	Russia	2:38.970	Q
3	Jin Jingzhu	China	2:39.151	Q
4	Ottilla Sillo	Romania	2:45.721	
5	Karyna Hryschanka	Belarus	2:49.247	
6	Ieva Haino	Latvia	2:50.949	

Heat 2

Rank	Athlete	Country	Time	Notes
1	Martina Valcepina	Italy	2:31.567	Q
2	Zsofia Konya	Hungary	2:32.366	Q
3	Lexi Burkholder	United States	2:34.780	Q
4	Maria Schulze	Germany	2:40.930	
5	Ana Ilijic	Croatia	2:42.883	

Heat 4

Rank	Athlete	Country	Time	Notes
1	Do Hee Noh	South Korea	2:32.904	Q
2	Veronika Denes	Hungary	2:33.599	Q
3	Izumi Nishii	Japan	2:33.695	Q
4	Olena Pashchenko	Ukraine	2:35.971	
5	Tunde Balazs	Romania	2:38.638	
6	Aarathy Kasturiraj	India	2:57.133	

Heat 6

Rank	Athlete	Country	Time	Notes
1	Hee Jung Cheon	South Korea	2:35.313	Q
2	Cynthia Mascitto	Canada	2:37.888	Q
3	Monika Heller	Germany	2:39.367	Q
4	Renata Szocs	Romania	2:42.858	
5	Elena Viviani	Italy	3:30.707	ADV
6	Moemi Kikuchi	Japan		DSQ

Heat 8

Rank	Athlete	Country	Time	Notes
1	Meng Lin	China	2:30.772	Q
2	Rachel Stewart	United States	2:31.938	Q
3	Catherine Alexander	Belgium	2:42.223	Q
4	Tifany Marchand	France		DSQ
5	Nathalie Prescher	Germany		DSQ

Heat 10

Rank	Athlete	Country	Time	Notes
1	Han Xiao	China	2:40.655	Q
2	Agnieszka Tawrel	Poland	2:43.042	Q
3	Xeniya Motova	Kazakhstan	2:43.160	Q
4	Lara Van Ruijven	Netherlands	2:43.573	
5	Elvira Bayazitova	Russia	2:44.808	
6	Rumiana Dimitrova	Bulgaria	2:46.453	

=== Quarterfinals ===
Top 3 Athletes from each heat qualify for Semifinals.

Heat 1

Rank	Athlete	Country	Time	Notes
1	Hee Jung Cheon	South Korea	2:30.115	Q
2	Deanna Lockett	Australia	2:30.938	Q
3	Patricia Toth	Hungary	2:32.366	Q
4	Izumi Nishii	Japan	2:32.683	
5	Anastassiya Krestova	Kazakhstan	2:43.617	

Heat 3

Rank	Athlete	Country	Time	Notes
1	Do Hee Noh	South Korea	2:36.472	Q
2	Han Xiao	China	2:36.575	Q
3	Cynthia Mascitto	Canada	2:37.606	Q
4	Izumi Nishii	United States	2:38.994	
5	Anastassiya Krestova	Poland	2:41.354	

Heat 5

Rank	Athlete	Country	Time	Notes
1	Laurie Marceau	Canada	2:36.749	Q
2	Ekaterina Baranok	Russia	2:36.893	Q
3	Elena Viviani	Italy	2:37.966	Q
4	Katherine Ralston	United States	2:41.317	
5	Agnieszka Tawrel	Poland	2:42.898	
6	Catherine Alexander	Belgium	2:45.356	

Heat 2

Rank	Athlete	Country	Time	Notes
1	Se Jung Ahn	South Korea	2:32.891	Q
2	Agne Sereikaite	Lithuania	2:34.278	Q
3	Evgeniya Zakharova	Russia	2:34.386	Q
4	Arianna Valcepina	Italy	2:34.563	
5	Xeniya Motova	Kazakhstan	2:35.433	
6	Lilia Dzhustrova	Bulgaria	2:43.451	

Heat 4

Rank	Athlete	Country	Time	Notes
1	Martina Valcepina	Italy	2:29.994	Q
2	Veronika Denes	Hungary	2:30.641	Q
3	Rachel Stewart	United States	2:30.911	Q
4	Jin Jingzhu	China	2:30.959	
5	Hsiao-Ying Chung	Chinese Taipei	2:36.741	

Heat 6

Rank	Athlete	Country	Time	Notes
1	Meng Lin	China	2:34.063	Q
2	Ann Veronique Michaud	Canada	2:34.491	Q
3	Zsofia Konya	Hungary	2:34.621	Q
4	Safiya Vlasova	Ukraine	2:34.752	
5	Monika Heller	Germany	2:45.087	

=== Semifinals ===
Top 2 Athletes from each heat qualify for Final.

Heat 1

Rank	Athlete	Country	Time	Notes
1	Hee Jung Cheon	South Korea	2:35.668	Q
2	Han Xiao	China	2:35.699	Q
3	Veronika Denes	Hungary	2:36.401	
4	Elena Viviani	Italy	2:39.716	
5	Rachel Stewart	United States	2:40.569	
6	Laurie Marceau	Canada		DSQ

Heat 3

Rank	Athlete	Country	Time	Notes
1	Se Jung Ahn	South Korea	2:30.912	Q
2	Meng Lin	China	2:31.702	Q
3	Ekaterina Baranok	Russia	2:31.934	
4	Agne Sereikaite	Lithuania	2:32.741	
5	Cynthia Mascitto	Canada	2:32.888	
6	Patricia Toth	Hungary	2:35.813	

Heat 2

Rank	Athlete	Country	Time	Notes
1	Do Hee Noh	South Korea	2:44.854	Q
2	Martina Valcepina	Italy	2:45.010	Q
3	Ann Veronique Michaud	Canada	2:45.440	
4	Zsofia Konya	Hungary	2:45.785	
5	Deanna Lockett	Australia	2:45.823	
6	Evgeniya Zakharova	Russia	2:45.965	

=== Final ===
Rank	Athlete	Country	Time	Notes
Gold medal	Hee Jung Cheon	South Korea	2:28.227	
Silver medal	Se Jung Ahn	South Korea	2:28.316	
Bronze medal	Ming Lin	China	2:28.858	
4	Martina Valcepina	Italy	2:29.811	
5	Han Xiao	China	2:31.820	
6	Do Hee Noh	South Korea		DSQ
