= Volha Talayeva =

Belarusian speed skater

Personal information
- Born: 6 January 1987 (age 39) Vitebsk, Belarusian SSR, Soviet Union
- Height: 5 ft 5 in (165 cm)
- Weight: 128 lb (58 kg)

Sport
- Country: Belarus
- Sport: Short track speed skating

Achievements and titles
- Highest world ranking: 38 (1500m)

Volha Talayeva (born 6 January 1987 in Vitebsk) is a Belarusian short track speed skater.

Talayeva competed at the 2014 Winter Olympics for Belarus. In the 1500 metres she was sixth in her heat, ending up 32nd overall.

As of September 2014, Talayeva's best performance at the World Championships came in 2014, when she finished 31st in the 1500m, and her top World Cup ranking is 38th, in the 1500 metres in 2013–14.
