= Tatiana Bodóvá =

Slovak speed skater

Personal information
- Born: 8 May 1991 (age 35) Levoča, Czechoslovakia
- Height: 5 ft 5 in (165 cm)
- Weight: 134 lb (61 kg)

Sport
- Country: Slovakia
- Sport: Short track speed skating

Achievements and titles
- Highest world ranking: 37 (1000m)

Tatiana Bodóvá (born 8 May 1991) is a Slovak short track speed skater.

Bodóvá competed at the 2014 Winter Olympics for Slovakia. In the 1500 metres she was fifth in her heat, ending up 29th overall.

As of September 2014, Bodóvá's best performance at the World Championships came in 2014, when she finished 15th in the 500m.

As of September 2014, Bodóvá's top World Cup ranking is 37th, in the 1000 metres in 2011–12.
