= Inna Simonova =

Kazakhstani speed skater (born 1990)

Personal information
- Born: 30 September 1990 (age 35) Oral, Kazakh SSR, Soviet Union
- Height: 5 ft 0 in (152 cm)
- Weight: 106 lb (48 kg)

Sport
- Country: Kazakhstan
- Sport: Short track speed skating

Achievements and titles
- Highest world ranking: 35 (1500m)

Inna Simonova (born 30 September 1990 in Oral) is a Kazakhstani short-track speed-skater. Simonova competed at the 2014 Winter Olympics representing Kazakhstan. In the 500 metres she came in fourth in her heat, in the 1000 metres she was third in her heat, and in the 1500 metres, she finishing fourth in her heat. Her best individual finish was in the 1000m, where she was 21st.

As of September 2014, Simonova's best performance at the World Championships came in 2014, when she finished 17th in the 1000m.

As of September 2014, Simonova's top World Cup ranking is 35th, in the 1500 metres in 2013–14.
