= Charlotte Gilmartin =

British short track speed skater

Charlotte Upcott
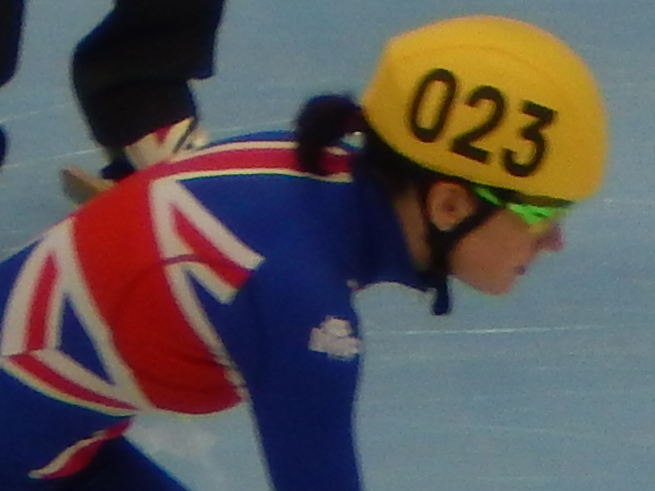
- Upcottt in 2015

Personal information
- Nationality: British
- Born: Charlotte Gilmartin; 7 March 1990 (age 36) Redditch, Worcestershire, England
- Height: 1.62 m (5 ft 4 in) (2014)
- Weight: 60 kg (132 lb) (2014)
- Spouse: Ian Upcott (m. 2018)

Sport
- Country: United Kingdom
- Sport: Short track speed skating
- Club: Mohawks Ice Racing Club
Medal record
European Championships
Gold medal – first place	2016 Sochi	3000m
Silver medal – second place	2016 Sochi	Overall

Charlotte Upcott (née Gilmartin born 7 March 1990) is a British short track speed skater who competed at the 2014 Winter Olympics in the 500m and 1500m events. She also competed at the 2018 Winter Olympics in the 500m, 1000m and 1500m events.

== Background ==
Gilmartin was born in Redditch, Worcestershire. She visited an ice-rink for a friend's party in 2001, where a trainer noticed her. She joined the Mohawks Ice Racing Club in Solihull. She is trained by former Olympian Jon Eley.

== Career ==
=== Sochi Olympic Games ===
She came 16th in the 500 metres in Sochi.

=== Pyeongchang Olympic Games ===
The ISU Short Track Speed Skating World Cup 2017-2018, in four rounds, served as the qualifiers for the Short track speed skating at the 2018 Winter Olympics.

In the first round, in Budapest, she finished 13th in the 1500 metres and 11th in the 500 metres. In the second round, in Dordrecht, she finished second in the 1000 metres. She finished 15th in the 1500 mètres. She finished 11th in the 500 metres. In the third round, in Shanghai, she was disqualified in the B final of the 1500 metres, coming 12th. She came 19th in the 1000 metres.
