= Emily Scott (speed skater) =

American short track speed skater (born 1989)

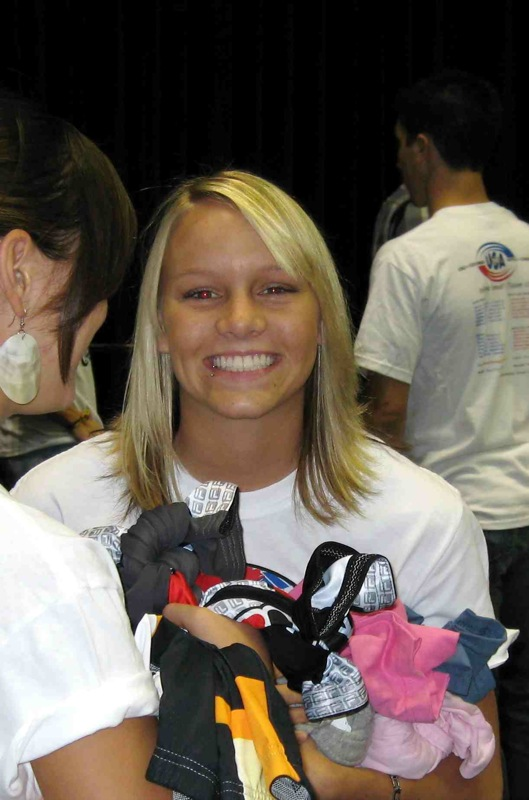
- Emily Scott in 2007

Personal information
- Born: February 16, 1989 (age 37) Springfield, Missouri, U.S.
- Height: 5 ft 3 in (160 cm)
- Weight: 112 lb (51 kg)

Sport
- Country: United States
- Sport: Short track speed skating
- Coached by: Stephen Gough
Medal record
Women's short track speed skating
Representing the United States
World Championships
Silver medal – second place	2012 Shanghai	3000 m relay
World Team Championships
Bronze medal – third place	2011 Warsaw	Team event

Emily Scott (born February 16, 1989) is an American short track speed skater who competed at 2014 Winter Olympics in Sochi, Russia. As a young girl, Scott was a gymnast and roller skater. She discontinued gymnastics when it became too expensive, and took up inline speed skating. As an inline skater, she won five World Championship gold medals and set three national records.

In 2008 Scott transitioned from inline skating to short track speed skating on the ice. She made the United States' World Cup and World Championship teams from 2010 to 2013, winning a silver medal at the 2012 World Championships. With Scott's help, the United States' relay team placed third in the overall 2010–11 World Cup standings and second in the 2011–12 standings. In 2012, she placed second overall at the U.S. National Championships.

Following a poor 2012–13 season, the United States cut Scott's funding, prompting her to fill out an application for food stamps. Shortly thereafter USA Today ran a story on her situation. The story prompted an outpouring of donations from the public, allowing Scott to focus on her training. The increased focus paid off, as Scott finished 2013 as the top rated American in the 1000 meters, second in the 1500 meters, and third in the 500 meters. At the 2014 Olympic Trials, she placed second in all three events, qualifying her for her first Olympics. Scott made the finals of 1500 meters at the Olympics, placing fifth after another skater caused her to fall. She was eliminated in the quarter finals of the 500 and 1000 meter events.

== Early life ==
Scott was born February 16, 1989, in Springfield, Missouri, to mother Carol and father Craig Scott. She grew up in Springfield, Missouri. When she was in third grade, she and her sister were removed from their mother's house. They were subsequently raised by their father. Scott graduated from Hillcrest High School in 2007.

As a young girl, Scott made the Junior Olympics Gymnastics Team, but gave up the sport because it was too expensive for her family. She first learned to roller skate at age two and a half, later taking up inline skating at the local roller rink, Skateport. At age 14, she moved to Florida for three years to focus on her inline training, returning to Springfield in time for high school graduation.

== Skating career ==
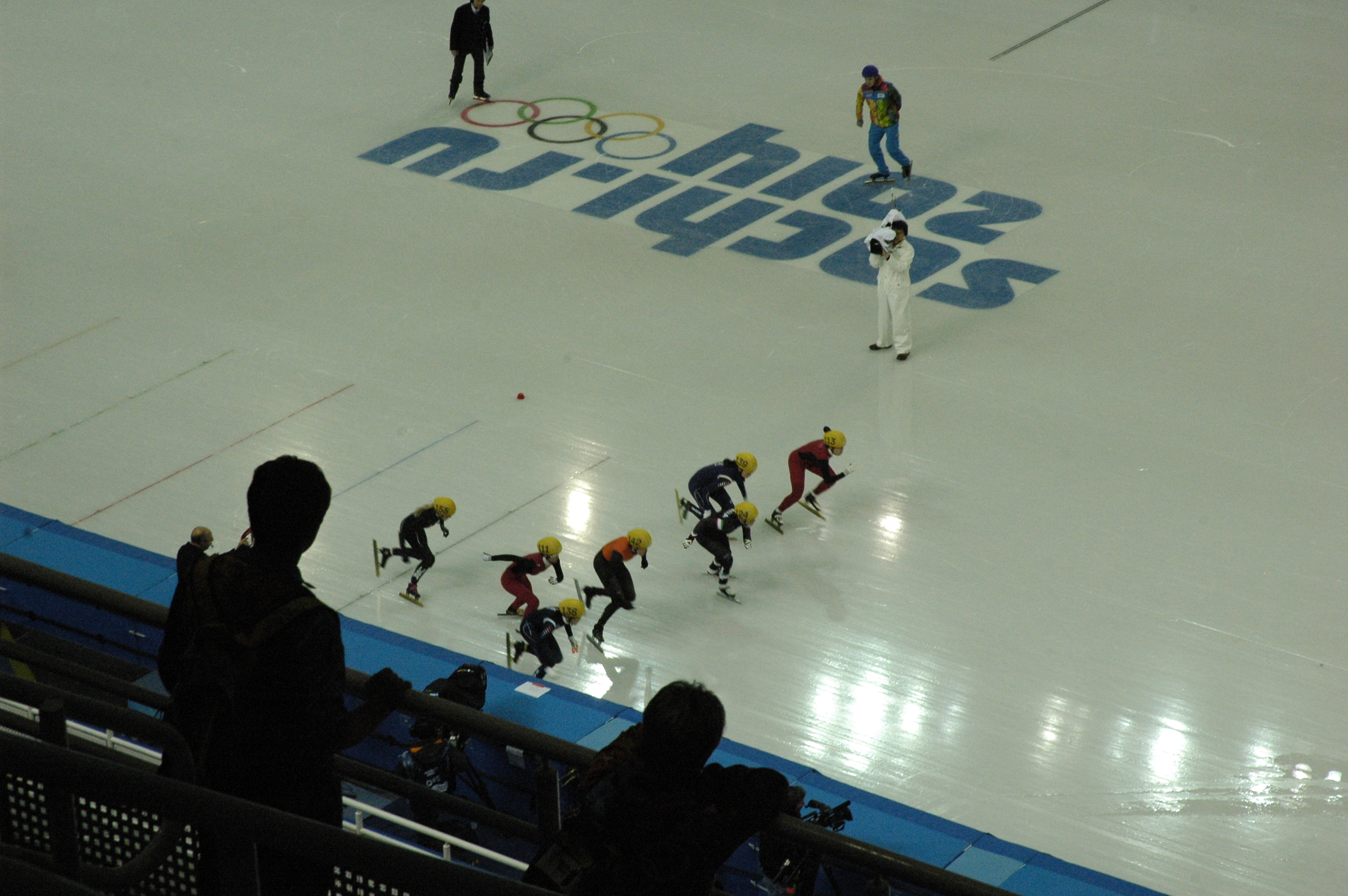
Scott competing at the 2014 Winter Olympics

Scott began her athletic career as an inline speed skater. In 2004, she teamed with Brittany Bowe to set the United States national record in the Sophomore 2000 meter two woman relay with a time of 3:12.574. In 2005, Scott won the junior 15000 meter elimination at the 2006 World Inline Speed Skating Championships, passing Columbia's Carolina Upegui on the final lap. At the 2008 World Championships, Bowe, Scott, and Sara Sayasane teamed up to win gold in the 3000 meter track relay. Also in 2008, Scott set the Senior national record in the 5000 meter elimination with a time of 8:45.049 and teamed up with Kirsten Attipoe to set the national record in the 3000 meter relay with a time of 4:53.179.

In all, Scott won five World Championship crowns before transitioning to the ice in 2008. She found the transition very difficult and nearly quit, but continued on the advice of her father. At the 2010 Olympic Trials, her third ever meet, Scott placed ninth overall. She quickly improved, making the United States' World Cup and World Championship Teams every year from 2010 to 2013.

Scott placed fourth overall at the 2010 and 2011 National Championships. As a member of the National Short Track Team, she has focused primarily on team relay events, helping the United States to place third in the 2010–2011 World Cup standings. At the 2011 World Team Championships, Scott helped the United States to a bronze medal. At the 2012 National Championships, Scott finished second overall. She helped the United States to a second-place finish in the 2011–12 World Cup relay standings and a silver medal at the 2012 World Championships. During the 2012–2013 season, the United States placed eighth in the World Cup relay standing. In total, Scott has won five World Cup medals – 1 gold, 3 silver, and 1 bronze, all for relay events.

After the relay team failed to place in the top eight at the 2013 World Championships, US Speedskating cut Scott's monthly stipend from $1950 to $600. She set up a GoFundMe campaign, but it generated little interest, prompting her to fill out an application for food stamps. USA Today ran a story on Scott's situation in July. Within 24 hours of the story, Scott had raised $30,000, more than double her stated goal. By August, she had generated over $48,000 in donations from 689 people. "It saved my career without a doubt," Scott remarked. She ended up not submitting the food stamp application and quit her part-time job at a surgical supply factory to focus on training. The support lifted an emotional burden and her increased focus allowed Scott to finish 2013 as the top rated American in the 1000 meters, second in the 1500 meters, and third in the 500 meters. The United States finished ninth in the World Cup relay standings for the 2013–14 season.

At the 2014 United States Olympic Trials, Scott placed second in both 500-meter short track races to secure a spot on the Olympic team. "I had no idea [I'd qualified]," she said after the second race. "My coach brought me over. I thought I was in trouble for not winning the race, and he congratulated me. I’m speechless." She also finished second in the 1000 and 1500 meter events at the Trials.

Scott made her Olympic debut in the 500 metres. She advanced through her opening round heat, but was eliminated in the quarter finals. In the 1500 metres, she coasted through the opening round, winning her heat. In the semi-finals, she was in qualifying position when pushed by a rival skater near the finish line. She placed last in the heat, but was advanced to the finals when the judges ruled she had been illegally inhibited by the skater who pushed her. In the final, a South Korean fell, taking Scott down in the process. She got up, but finished fifth. She concluded her Olympics by advancing out of the opening round of the 1000 metres before being eliminated in the quarter finals.

The 1000 and 1500 meters are considered Scott's stronger events, and she lists endurance as her greatest strength. She is coached by Stephen Gough.

== Personal life ==
Scott's mother, Carol, was jailed for selling methamphetamine. When she got out, Scott would occasionally send her money, but Carol soon fell back into the drug trade and Scott stopped sending money. She has not heard from her mother since. Carol and her other daughter are in prison on drug charges as of 2014. Scott's brother died as an infant when she was a teenager. Her father makes his living installing signage.

Scott is close friends with 2002 Olympic gold medalist Derek Parra who helped her transition to ice speed skating with his Wheels on Ice Program (WhIP). "[Parra is] like a fun uncle .. we go to lunch and dinner and he’ll always be just kind of my mentor and I can talk to him if I’m having a rough time", Scott explained. "He’s always been there for me." Scott says her father is her best friend and idol.

Scott is a big fan of the St. Louis Cardinals. When not skating, she enjoys playing golf, watching movies, and talking to her family over Skype. She lists her father as the greatest influence in her life. As of 2014, Scott is pursuing a business degree at Ashworth College.
