= Italy at the 2014 Winter Olympics =

- IOC code: ITA
- NOC: Italian National Olympic Committee
- Website: www.coni.it (in Italian)

in Sochi
- Competitors: 113 in 13 sports
- Flag bearers: Armin Zöggeler (opening); Arianna Fontana (closing)
- Medals Ranked 22nd: Gold 0 Silver 2 Bronze 6 Total 8

Winter Olympics appearances (overview)
- 1924; 1928; 1932; 1936; 1948; 1952; 1956; 1960; 1964; 1968; 1972; 1976; 1980; 1984; 1988; 1992; 1994; 1998; 2002; 2006; 2010; 2014; 2018; 2022; 2026

Italy competed at the 2014 Winter Olympics in Sochi, Russia, from 7 to 23 February 2014. One athlete, bobsledder William Frullani, had been tested positive for methylhexanamine and was sent home from Sochi. For the first time since 1980, Italy failed to win a gold medal in the Winter Olympics. Closest was the alpine skier Christof Innerhofer who lost the gold in downhill against Matthias Mayer of Austria with only six hundredths of a second separating the two.

== Medalists ==
Medal	Name	Sport	Event	Date
Silver	Christof Innerhofer	Alpine skiing	Men's downhill	9 February
Silver	Arianna Fontana	Short track speed skating	Women's 500 metres	13 February
Bronze	Armin Zöggeler	Luge	Men's singles	9 February
Bronze	Christof Innerhofer	Alpine skiing	Men's combined	14 February
Bronze	Arianna Fontana	Short track speed skating	Women's 1500 metres	15 February
Bronze	Arianna Fontana; Lucia Peretti; Martina Valcepina; Elena Viviani	Short track speed skating	Women's 3000 m relay	18 February
Bronze	Lukas Hofer; Karin Oberhofer; Dorothea Wierer; Dominik Windisch	Biathlon	Mixed relay	19 February
Bronze	Carolina Kostner	Figure skating	Ladies' singles	20 February

Medals by sport
Sport	1st place, gold medalist(s)	2nd place, silver medalist(s)	3rd place, bronze medalist(s)	Total
Alpine skiing	0	1	1	2
Biathlon	0	0	1	1
Figure skating	0	0	1	1
Luge	0	0	1	1
Short track	0	1	2	3
Total	0	2	6	8

Medals by date
Day	Date	1st place, gold medalist(s)	2nd place, silver medalist(s)	3rd place, bronze medalist(s)	Total
Day 2	9 February	0	1	1	2
Day 3	10 February	0	0	0	0
Day 4	11 February	0	0	0	0
Day 5	12 February	0	0	0	0
Day 6	13 February	0	1	0	1
Day 7	14 February	0	0	1	1
Day 8	15 February	0	0	1	1
Day 9	16 February	0	0	0	0
Day 10	17 February	0	0	0	0
Day 11	18 February	0	0	1	1
Day 12	19 February	0	0	1	1
Day 13	20 February	0	0	1	1
Day 14	21 February	0	0	0	0
Day 15	22 February	0	0	0	0
Day 16	23 February	0	0	0	0
Total		0	2	6	8

== Alpine skiing ==
According to the quota allocation released on 27 January 2014, Italy qualified a total of 19 athletes in alpine skiing.

Men

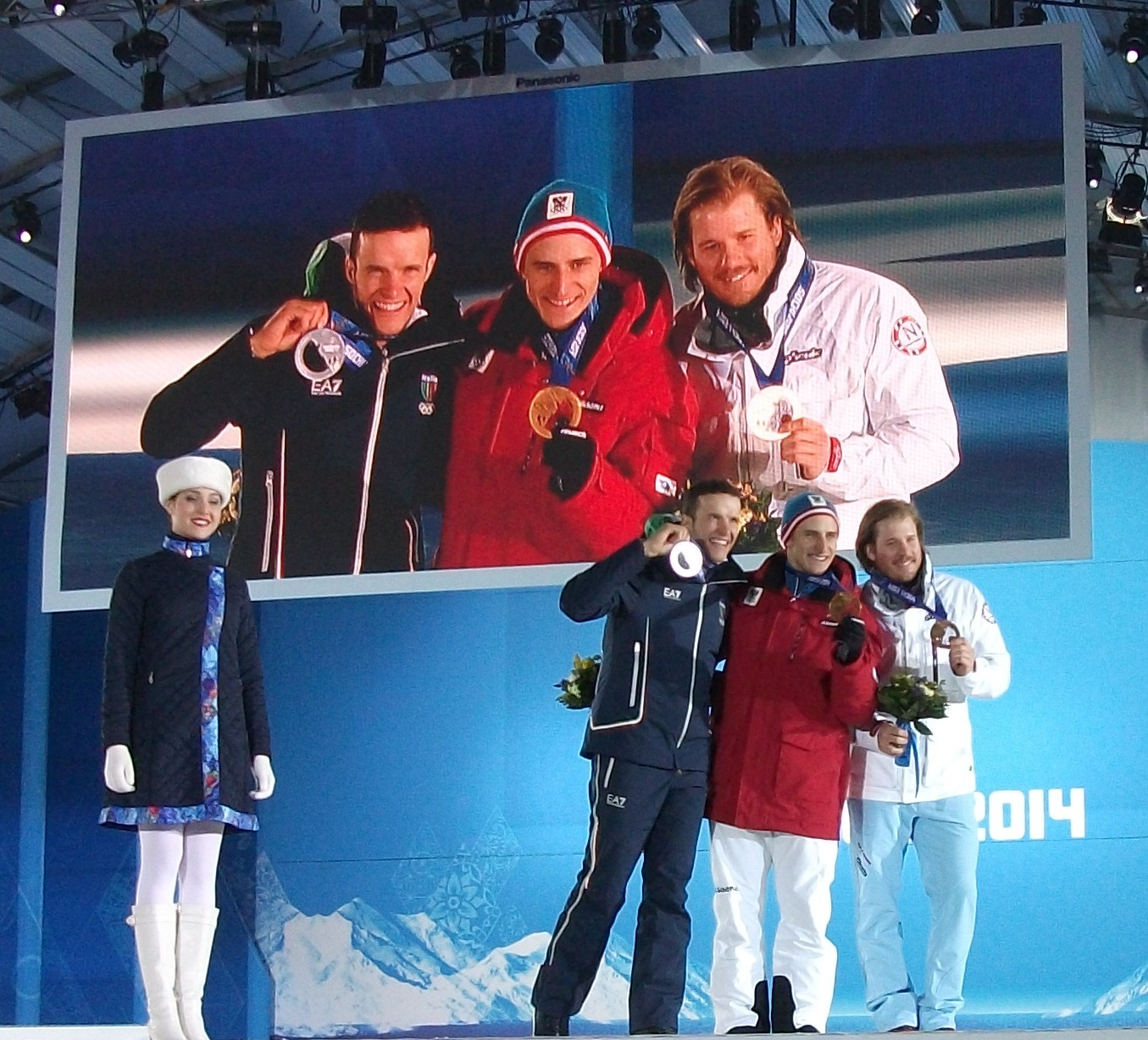
Christof Innerhofer won silver in the donwhill

Athlete	Event	Run 1		Run 2		Total	
Athlete	Event	Time	Rank	Time	Rank	Time	Rank
Luca de Aliprandini	Giant slalom	1:23.08	19	1:23.83	7	2:46.91	11
Peter Fill	Downhill	—N/a				2:06.72	7
Peter Fill	Super-G	—N/a				1:18.85	8
Peter Fill	Combined	1:54.98	15	DNF			
Stefano Gross	Slalom	47.45	=3	55.27	7	1:42.72	=4
Werner Heel	Downhill	—N/a				2:07.16	12
Werner Heel	Super-G	—N/a				1:19.74	=17
Christof Innerhofer	Downhill	—N/a				2:06.29	2nd place, silver medalist(s)
Christof Innerhofer	Super-G	—N/a				DNF	
Christof Innerhofer	Combined	1:54.30	8	51.37	=3	2:45.67	3rd place, bronze medalist(s)
Manfred Mölgg	Giant slalom	1:22.93	17	DNF			
Manfred Mölgg	Slalom	48.38	=12	DNF			
Roberto Nani	Giant slalom	1:22.65	12	DNF			
Dominik Paris	Downhill	—N/a				2:07.13	11
Dominik Paris	Super-G	—N/a				1:19.70	16
Dominik Paris	Combined	1:54.46	10	54.99	22	2:49.45	19
Giuliano Razzoli	Slalom	48.50	16	DNF			
Davide Simoncelli	Giant slalom	1:22.35	3	1:25.00	23	2:47.35	17
Patrick Thaler	Slalom	DNF					

Women

Athlete	Event	Run 1		Run 2		Total	
Athlete	Event	Time	Rank	Time	Rank	Time	Rank
Federica Brignone	Giant slalom	DNF					
Federica Brignone	Slalom	56.98	22	DNF			
Federica Brignone	Combined	1:45.68	22	51.94	9	2:37.62	11
Chiara Costazza	Slalom	57.32	25	DNF			
Elena Fanchini	Downhill	—N/a				1:42.70	12
Elena Fanchini	Combined	1:44.45	14	DNS			
Nadia Fanchini	Downhill	—N/a				1:43.48	22
Nadia Fanchini	Super-G	—N/a				1:27.20	10
Nadia Fanchini	Giant slalom	1:18.53	3	1:18.72	7	2:37.25	4
Denise Karbon	Giant slalom	1:19.49	8	DNF			
Francesca Marsaglia	Super-G	—N/a				DNF	
Francesca Marsaglia	Combined	1:43.96	9	DNF			
Francesca Marsaglia	Giant slalom	1:21.63	26	1:18.29	4	2:39.92	16
Daniela Merighetti	Downhill	—N/a				1:41.84	4
Daniela Merighetti	Super-G	—N/a				DNF	
Daniela Merighetti	Combined	1:44.64	15	DNS			
Verena Stuffer	Downhill	—N/a				1:42.75	14
Verena Stuffer	Super-G	—N/a				1:27.52	=11

== Biathlon ==
Based on their performance at the 2012 and 2013 Biathlon World Championships, Italy qualified 5 men and 5 women.

Men

Athlete	Event	Time	Misses	Rank
Christian De Lorenzi	Sprint	26:25.4	2 (1+1)	47
Christian De Lorenzi	Pursuit	36:58.2	2 (1+1+0+0)	42
Christian De Lorenzi	Individual	53:13.1	2 (1+0+0+1)	31
Lukas Hofer	Sprint	25:08.8	1 (0+1)	12
Lukas Hofer	Pursuit	34:53.1	2 (1+0+0+1)	17
Lukas Hofer	Individual	51:34.6	2 (0+1+0+1)	14
Lukas Hofer	Mass start	DNF	4 (2+2+0)	DNF
Dominik Windisch	Sprint	25:07.6	1 (1+0)	11
Dominik Windisch	Pursuit	35:40.0	4 (1+0+2+1)	25
Dominik Windisch	Individual	56:31.4	6 (1+1+1+3)	65
Dominik Windisch	Mass start	45:28.4	5 (1+1+3+0)	25
Markus Windisch	Sprint	28:14.4	2 (1+1)	81
Markus Windisch	Individual	57:18.5	4 (0+2+1+1)	71
Christian De Lorenzi; Lukas Hofer; Dominik Windisch; Markus Windisch	Team relay	1:13:15.5	11 (0+11)	5

Women

Athlete	Event	Time	Misses	Rank
Nicole Gontier	Sprint	23:26.3	4 (1+3)	54
Nicole Gontier	Pursuit	34:37.5	6 (2+2+0+2)	49
Nicole Gontier	Individual	49:51.2	4 (0+1+2+1)	45
Karin Oberhofer	Sprint	21:34.7	0 (0+0)	4
Karin Oberhofer	Pursuit	30:37.8	1 (0+0+1+0)	8
Karin Oberhofer	Individual	46:46.6	2 (0+0+0+2)	14
Karin Oberhofer	Mass start	37:03.6	2 (0+0+1+1)	13
Michela Ponza	Sprint	22:47.0	0 (0+0)	38
Michela Ponza	Pursuit	34:36.4	3 (1+1+0+1)	48
Alexia Runggaldier	Individual	49:35.6	1 (1+0+0+0)	43
Dorothea Wierer	Sprint	21:37.4	0 (0+0)	6
Dorothea Wierer	Pursuit	31:03.2	2 (0+0+2+0)	17
Dorothea Wierer	Individual	DNS		
Dorothea Wierer	Mass start	38:37.4	3 (1+2+0+0)	25
Nicole Gontier; Karin Oberhofer; Michela Ponza; Dorothea Wierer	Team relay	1:11:43.3	10 (1+9)	6

Mixed

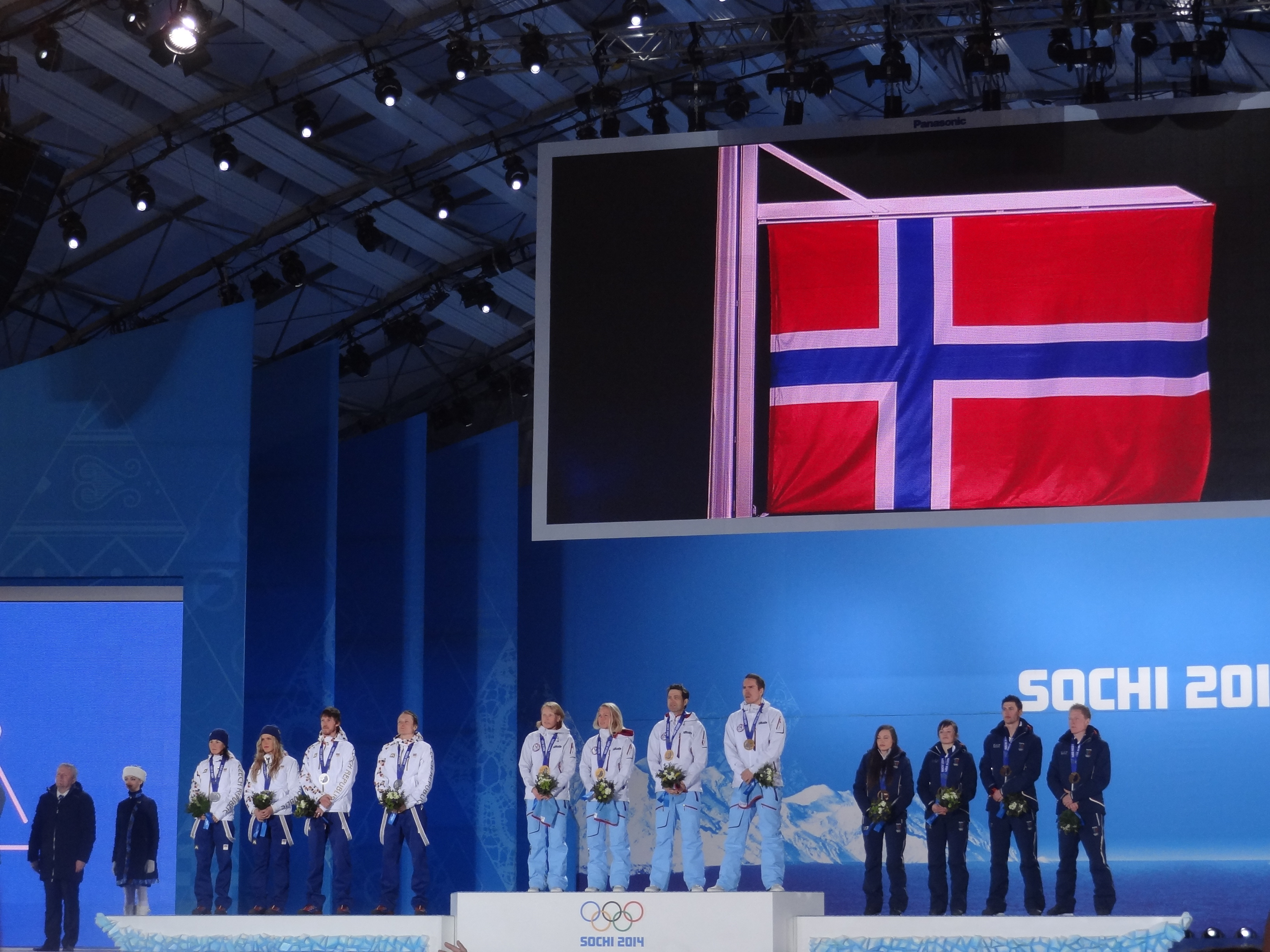
Italy won bronze in the mixed relay

Athlete	Event	Time	Misses	Rank
Lukas Hofer; Karin Oberhofer; Dorothea Wierer; Dominik Windisch	Team relay	1:10:15.2	6 (0+6)	3rd place, bronze medalist(s)

== Bobsleigh ==
Italy rejected quota in the two-woman event. It kept its quota in the 2 and 4 man events.

Athlete	Event	Run 1		Run 2		Run 3		Run 4		Total	
Athlete	Event	Time	Rank	Time	Rank	Time	Rank	Time	Rank	Time	Rank
Simone Bertazzo*; Simone Fontana	Two-man	57.06	15	57.02	13	56.90	13	56.84	=10	3:47.82	14
Simone Bertazzo*; Francesco Costa; Simone Fontana; Samuele Romanini	Four-man	55.78	17	55.73	19	56.06	=19	55.88	=17	3:43.45	18

* – Denotes the driver of each sled

== Cross-country skiing ==
According to the quota allocation released on 27 January 2014, Italy qualified a total of 16 athletes in cross-country skiing.

Distance
Men

Athlete	Event	Classical		Freestyle		Final		
Athlete	Event	Time	Rank	Time	Rank	Time	Deficit	Rank
Roland Clara	30 km skiathlon	37:19.9	38	33:04.3	26	1:10:56.3	+2:40.9	30
Roland Clara	50 km freestyle	—N/a				1:47:28.6	+33.4	11
Francesco de Fabiani	15 km classical	—N/a				41:00.8	+2:31.1	30
Francesco de Fabiani	30 km skiathlon	36:37.6	22	32:59.6	22	1:10:10.7	+1:55.3	22
Francesco de Fabiani	50 km freestyle	—N/a				1:47:51.8	+56.6	25
Giorgio di Centa	30 km skiathlon	36:02.6	8	32:11.1	14	1:08:43.7	+28.3	12
David Hofer	50 km freestyle	—N/a				1:47:35.7	+40.5	16
Dietmar Nöckler	15 km classical	—N/a				41:11.9	+2:42.2	32
Fabio Pasini	15 km classical	—N/a				41:20.1	+2:50.4	36
Mattia Pellegrin	15 km classical	—N/a				42:42.3	+4:12.6	48
Roland Clara; Giorgio di Centa; David Hofer; Dietmar Nöckler	4×10 km relay	—N/a				1:30:04.7	+1:22.7	5

Women

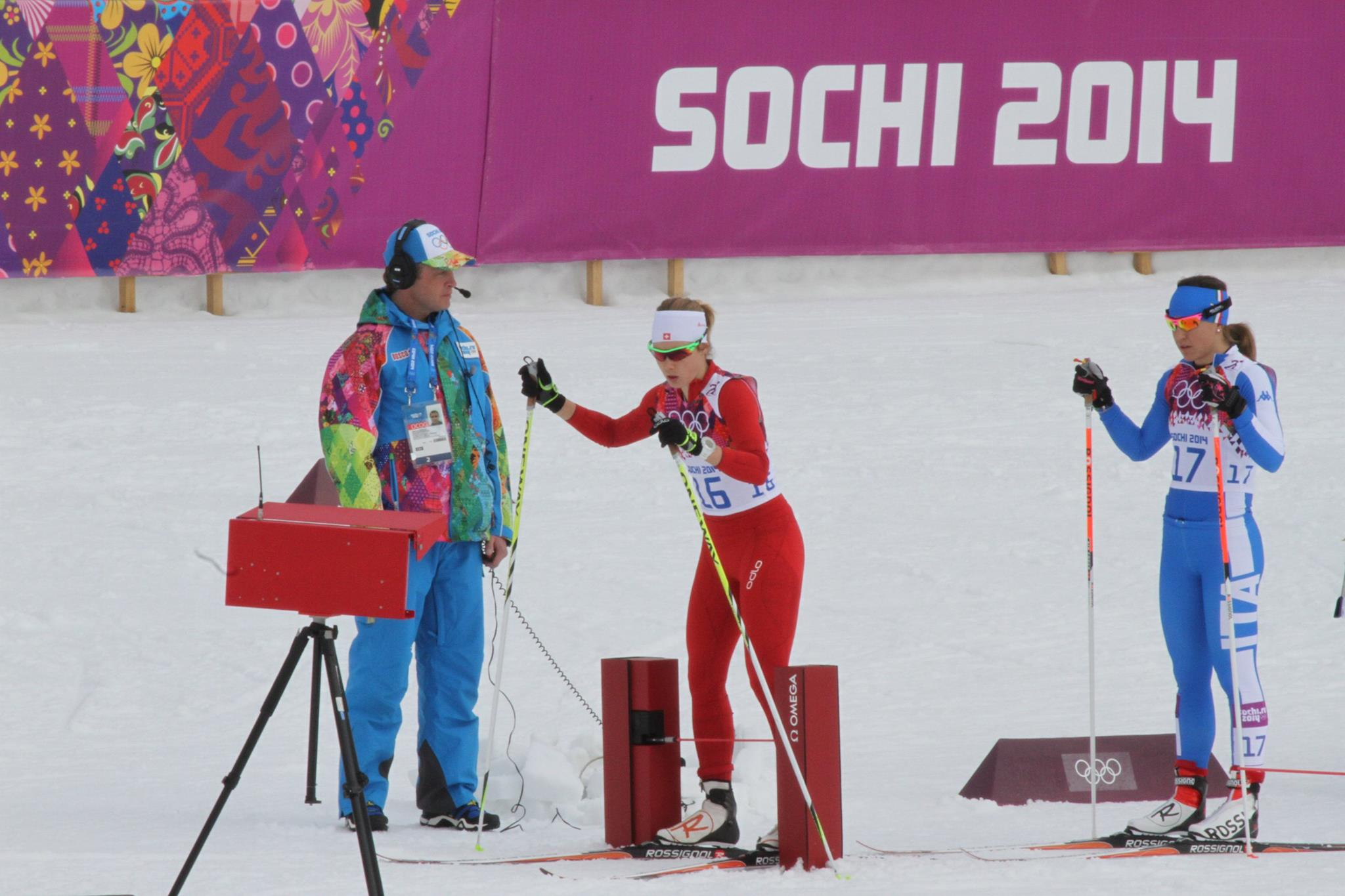
Greta Laurent (right)

Athlete	Event	Classical		Freestyle		Final		
Athlete	Event	Time	Rank	Time	Rank	Time	Deficit	Rank
Debora Agreiter	15 km skiathlon	20:25.4	37	20:04.9	21	41:04.8	+2:31.2	30
Debora Agreiter	30 km freestyle	—N/a				1:12:58.5	+1:53.3	13
Elisa Brocard	10 km classical	—N/a				31:28.0	+3:10.2	37
Elisa Brocard	15 km skiathlon	20:20.3	36	20:18.0	30	41:12.6	+2:39.0	32
Elisa Brocard	30 km freestyle	—N/a				1:12:42.0	+1:36.8	13
Ilaria Debertolis	30 km freestyle	—N/a				1:20:22.2	+9:17.0	44
Virginia de Martin Topranin	15 km skiathlon	20:19.8	35	21:19.8	42	42:17.6	+3:44.0	44
Marina Piller	10 km classical	—N/a				31:07.6	+2:49.8	36
Marina Piller	15 km skiathlon	19:54.7	19	19:36.1	9	40:14.0	+1:40.4	16
Marina Piller	30 km freestyle	—N/a				1:14:44.7	+3:39.5	25
Elisa Brocard; Virginia de Martin Topranin; Ilaria Debertolis; Marina Piller	4×5 km relay	—N/a				55:19.9	+2:17.2	8

Sprint
Men

Athlete	Event	Qualification		Quarterfinal		Semifinal		Final	
Athlete	Event	Time	Rank	Time	Rank	Time	Rank	Time	Rank
David Hofer	Sprint	3:35.68	18 Q	3:44.87	3	Did not advance			
Enrico Nizzi	Sprint	3:40.89	44	Did not advance					
Dietmar Nöckler	Sprint	3:40.27	37	Did not advance					
Federico Pellegrino	Sprint	3:30.38	3 Q	3:43.97	1 Q	3:55.99	6	Did not advance	
Dietmar Nöckler; Federico Pellegrino	Team sprint	—N/a				23:58.12	5	Did not advance	

Women

Athlete	Event	Qualification		Quarterfinal		Semifinal		Final	
Athlete	Event	Time	Rank	Time	Rank	Time	Rank	Time	Rank
Ilaria Debertolis	Sprint	2:40.29	32	Did not advance					
Greta Laurent	Sprint	2:36.30	16 Q	2:52.07	6	Did not advance			
Gaia Vuerich	Sprint	2:35.81	13 Q	2:35.65	3 q	2:36.87	3	Did not advance	
Ilaria Debertolis; Gaia Vuerich	Team sprint	—N/a				17:35.98	7	Did not advance	

== Figure skating ==
Italy achieved the following quota places:

Athlete	Event	SP/OD		FS/FD		Total	
Athlete	Event	Points	Rank	Points	Rank	Points	Rank
Paul Bonifacio Parkinson	Men's singles	56.30	27	Did not advance			
Carolina Kostner	Ladies' singles	74.12	3 Q	142.61	4	216.73	3rd place, bronze medalist(s)
Valentina Marchei	Ladies' singles	57.02	12 Q	116.31	10	173.33	11
Stefania Berton / Ondřej Hotárek	Pairs	63.57	11 Q	115.51	10	179.08	11
Nicole Della Monica / Matteo Guarise	Pairs	51.64	16 Q	86.22	16	137.86	16
Anna Cappellini / Luca Lanotte	Ice dancing	67.58	6 Q	101.92	7	169.50	6
Charlène Guignard / Marco Fabbri	Ice dancing	58.14	15 Q	86.64	14	144.78	14

Team trophy

Athlete	Event	Short program/Short dance						Free skate/Free dance					
Athlete	Event	Men's	Ladies'	Pairs	Ice dance	Total		Men's	Ladies'	Pairs	Ice dance	Total	
Athlete	Event	Points Team points	Points Team points	Points Team points	Points Team points	Points	Rank	Points Team points	Points Team points	Points Team points	Points Team points	Points	Rank
Paul Bonifacio Parkinson (M); Carolina Kostner (L) (SP); Valentina Marchei (L) (FS); Stefania Berton / Ondřej Hotárek (P); Anna Cappellini / Luca Lanotte (I) (OD); Charlène Guignard / Marco Fabbri (I) (FD)	Team trophy	53.94; 1	70.84; 9	70.31; 7	64.92; 6	23	4 Q	121.23; 6	112.51; 8	120.82; 8	81.25; 7	52	4

== Freestyle skiing ==
Moguls

Athlete	Event	Qualification								Final											
Athlete	Event	Run 1				Run 2				Run 1				Run 2				Run 3			
Athlete	Event	Time	Points	Total	Rank	Time	Points	Total	Rank	Time	Points	Total	Rank	Time	Points	Total	Rank	Time	Points	Total	Rank
Giacomo Matiz	Men's moguls	26.48	15.1	20.61	14	26.64	13.66	19.1	11	Did not advance											
Deborah Scanzio	Women's moguls	30.56	14.20	20.02	13	31.04	15.38	21.01	2 Q	29.94	14.05	20.12	12 Q	29.59	13.86	20.07	11	Did not advance			

Slopestyle

Athlete	Event	Qualification				Final			
Athlete	Event	Run 1	Run 2	Best	Rank	Run 1	Run 2	Best	Rank
Markus Eder	Men's slopestyle	11.80	79.00	79.00	15	Did not advance			
Silvia Bertagna	Women's slopestyle	70.60	11.80	70.60	12 Q	69.60	21.80	69.60	8

== Luge ==
Italy earned the maximum quota of ten spots.

Men

Athlete	Event	Run 1		Run 2		Run 3		Run 4		Total	
Athlete	Event	Time	Rank	Time	Rank	Time	Rank	Time	Rank	Time	Rank
Dominik Fischnaller	Singles	52.729	9	52.540	5	52.007	5	52.203	11	3:29.479	6
Emanuel Rieder	Singles	52.981	17	52.875	17	52.578	22	52.511	19	3:30.945	19
Armin Zöggeler	Singles	52.506	3	52.387	3	51.910	3	51.994	3	3:28.797	3rd place, bronze medalist(s)
Patrick Gruber; Christian Oberstolz	Doubles	49.976	7	50.043	8	—N/a				1:40.019	6
Patrick Rastner; Ludwig Rieder	Doubles	50.064	8	49.975	5	—N/a				1:40.039	7

Women

Athlete	Event	Run 1		Run 2		Run 3		Run 4		Total	
Athlete	Event	Time	Rank	Time	Rank	Time	Rank	Time	Rank	Time	Rank
Sandra Gasparini	Singles	51.032	14	50.803	14	50.959	14	50.962	15	3:23.756	14
Sandra Robatscher	Singles	51.589	23	50.981	17	51.678	23	51.258	19	3:25.506	22
Andrea Voetter	Singles	50.937	12	51.592	27	51.420	20	51.290	20	3:25.239	19

Mixed team relay

Athlete	Event	Run 1		Run 2		Run 3		Total	
Athlete	Event	Time	Rank	Time	Rank	Time	Rank	Time	Rank
Sandra Gasparini; Patrick Gruber; Christian Oberstolz; Armin Zöggeler	Team relay	54.823	6	56.039	3	56.558	6	2:47.420	5

== Nordic combined ==
Athlete	Event	Ski jumping			Cross-country		Total	
Athlete	Event	Distance	Points	Rank	Time	Rank	Time	Rank
Armin Bauer	Normal hill/10 km	92.5	107.3	35	23:19.7	7	24:56.7	11
Armin Bauer	Large hill/10 km	115.0	91.4	41	22:23.5	3	24:53.5	23
Samuel Costa	Normal hill/10 km	91.0	106.1	40	24:31.2	28	26:13.2	30
Giuseppe Michielli	Large hill/10 km	114.5	89.1	44	24:16.9	38	26:56.9	41
Alessandro Pittin	Normal hill/10 km	94.5	113.4	25	22:47.5	1	23:59.5	4
Alessandro Pittin	Large hill/10 km	119.5	93.2	39	22:20.5	1	24:43.5	18
Lukas Runggaldier	Normal hill/10 km	97.0	115.7	21	23:06.9	3	24:09.9	7
Lukas Runggaldier	Large hill/10 km	112.5	86.8	46	22:44.0	11	25:33.0	28
Armin Bauer; Samuel Costa; Alessandro Pittin; Lukas Runggaldier	Team large hill/4×5 km	459.0	383.9	9	47:54.7	8	50:04.7	8

== Short track speed skating ==
Italy qualified five skaters of each gender for the Olympics during World Cup 3 and 4 in November 2013. Cecilia Maffei was the 5th woman to qualify for the team but she did not skate in any individual distances or in the relay.

Men

Athlete	Event	Heat		Quarterfinal		Semifinal		Final	
Athlete	Event	Time	Rank	Time	Rank	Time	Rank	Time	Rank
Yuri Confortola	500 m	42.042	3	Did not advance					21
Yuri Confortola	1000 m	1:26.956	2 Q	1:25.428	4	Did not advance			15
Yuri Confortola	1500 m	2:14.143	2 Q	—N/a		2:19.086	5	Did not advance	14
Tommaso Dotti	1500 m	2:17.300	5	—N/a		Did not advance			27
Anthony Lobello, Jr.	500 m	42.133	4	Did not advance					25
Yuri Confortola; Tommaso Dotti; Anthony Lobello, Jr. Nicola Rodigari; Davide Viscardi	5000 m relay	—N/a				6:45.253	3 FB	6:44.904	8

Women

Athlete	Event	Heat		Quarterfinal		Semifinal		Final	
Athlete	Event	Time	Rank	Time	Rank	Time	Rank	Time	Rank
Arianna Fontana	500 m	43.568	1 Q	43.405	1 Q	43.642	2 Q	51.250	2nd place, silver medalist(s)
Arianna Fontana	1000 m	1:32.983	1 Q	PEN		Did not advance			
Arianna Fontana	1500 m	2:29.645	1 Q	—N/a		2:19.336	1 FA	2:19.416	3rd place, bronze medalist(s)
Lucia Peretti	1500 m	2:22.953	4	—N/a		Did not advance			20
Martina Valcepina	500 m	44.493	3	Did not advance					20
Martina Valcepina	1000 m	1:34.226	3 ADV	DNS		Did not advance			23
Martina Valcepina	1500 m	2:27.212	4	—N/a		Did not advance			23
Elena Viviani	500 m	44.623	4	Did not advance					26
Elena Viviani	1000 m	1:33.352	4	Did not advance					27
Arianna Fontana; Lucia Peretti; Martina Valcepina; Elena Viviani	3000 m relay	—N/a				4:11.282	2 FA	4:14.014	3rd place, bronze medalist(s)

Qualification legend: ADV – Advanced due to being impeded by another skater; FA – Qualify to medal round; FB – Qualify to consolation round

== Skeleton ==
Athlete	Event	Run 1		Run 2		Run 3		Run 4		Total	
Athlete	Event	Time	Rank	Time	Rank	Time	Rank	Time	Rank	Time	Rank
Maurizio Oioli	Men's	57.69	16	57.27	16	57.85	19	57.87	18	3:50.68	19

== Ski jumping ==
Italy received the following start quotas:

Athlete	Event	Qualification			First round			Final			Total	
Athlete	Event	Distance	Points	Rank	Distance	Points	Rank	Distance	Points	Rank	Points	Rank
Davide Bresadola	Men's normal hill	90.5	104.3	38 Q	DSQ			Did not advance				
Davide Bresadola	Men's large hill	115.0	83.9	41	Did not advance							
Sebastian Colloredo	Men's normal hill	97.0	116.9	11 Q	97.0	118.9	29 Q	94.0	113.7	27	232.6	28
Sebastian Colloredo	Men's large hill	124.0	104.1	22 Q	130.5	116.7	26 Q	124.5	102.9	30	219.6	30
Roberto Dellasega	Men's normal hill	89.5	96.4	44	Did not advance							
Roberto Dellasega	Men's large hill	112.0	68.9	50	Did not advance							
Evelyn Insam	Women's normal hill	—N/a			98.0	120.5	4	99.0	121.7	4	242.2	5
Elena Runggaldier	Women's normal hill	—N/a			85.0	86.2	29	88.0	93.4	28	179.6	29

== Snowboarding ==
Alpine

Athlete	Event	Qualification		Round of 16	Quarterfinal	Semifinal	Final	
Athlete	Event	Time	Rank	Opposition Time	Opposition Time	Opposition Time	Opposition Time	Rank
Mainhard Erlacher	Men's giant slalom	DSQ		Did not advance				
Mainhard Erlacher	Men's slalom	1:00.62	25	Did not advance				
Roland Fischnaller	Men's giant slalom	1:40.48	18	Did not advance				
Roland Fischnaller	Men's slalom	59.43	9 Q	Flütsch (SUI); W −0.11	Wild (RUS); L +0.52	Did not advance		
Aaron March	Men's giant slalom	DSQ		Did not advance				
Aaron March	Men's slalom	59.44	11	S Schoch (SUI); W DSQ	Mathies (AUT); W −0.29	Košir (SLO); L DSQ	Karl (AUT); L +16.25	4
Christoph Mick	Men's giant slalom	1:48.25	28	Did not advance				
Christoph Mick	Men's slalom	1:00.22	20	Did not advance				
Corinna Boccacini	Women's giant slalom	1:51.85	16 Q	Takeuchi (JPN); L +1.93	Did not advance			
Corinna Boccacini	Women's slalom	1:04.96	8 Q	Riegler (AUT); W −2.78	Kreiner (AUT); W −0.05	Dujmovits (AUT); L +5.18	Kober (GER); L +0.13	4
Nadya Ochner	Women's giant slalom	1:59.88	26	Did not advance				
Nadya Ochner	Women's slalom	1:05.79	22	Did not advance				

Snowboard cross

Athlete	Event	Seeding		Round of 16	Quarterfinal	Semifinal	Final	
Athlete	Event	Time	Rank	Position	Position	Position	Position	Rank
Tommaso Leoni	Men's snowboard cross	CAN		3 Q	DSQ	did not advance		=21
Luca Matteotti	Men's snowboard cross	CAN		3 Q	3 Q	3 FA	6	6
Emanuel Perathoner	Men's snowboard cross	CAN		DNS	Did not advance			
Omar Visintin	Men's snowboard cross	CAN		2 Q	2 Q	DNF FB	DNS	12
Raffaella Brutto	Women's snowboard cross	1:25.11	18	—N/a	4	Did not advance		16
Michela Moioli	Women's snowboard cross	1:24.72	16	—N/a	2 Q	3 FA	DNF	6

Qualification legend: FA – Qualify to medal final; FB – Qualify to consolation final

== Speed skating ==
Italy achieved the following quota places:

Men

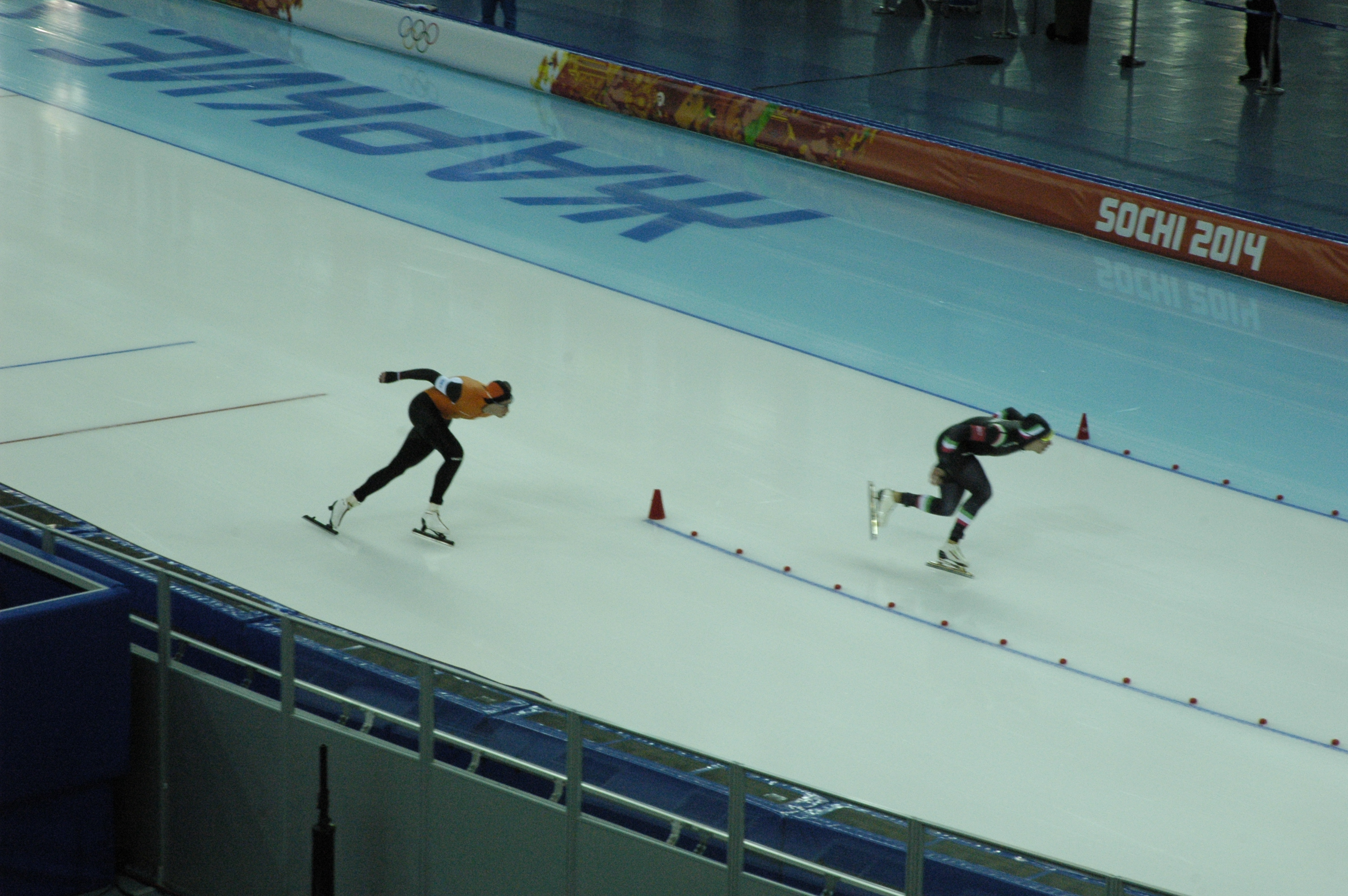
Mirko Giacomo Nenzi (right) riding the 1500 m

Athlete	Event	Race 1		Race 2		Final	
Athlete	Event	Time	Rank	Time	Rank	Time	Rank
Matteo Anesi	1500 m	—N/a				1:50.59	39
David Bosa	500 m	35.63	32	35.64	31	71.28	31
Andrea Giovannini	5000 m	—N/a				6:30.84	17
Mirko Giacomo Nenzi	500 m	35.56	29	35.51	25	71.07	28
Mirko Giacomo Nenzi	1000 m	—N/a				1:10.32	25
Mirko Giacomo Nenzi	1500 m	—N/a				1:47.48	17

Women

Athlete	Event	Race 1		Race 2		Final	
Athlete	Event	Time	Rank	Time	Rank	Time	Rank
Yvonne Daldossi	500 m	39.30	29	39.34	31	78.64	30
Francesca Lollobrigida	3000 m	—N/a				4:16.51	23
