= Evgeniya Zakharova =

Russian short track speed skater

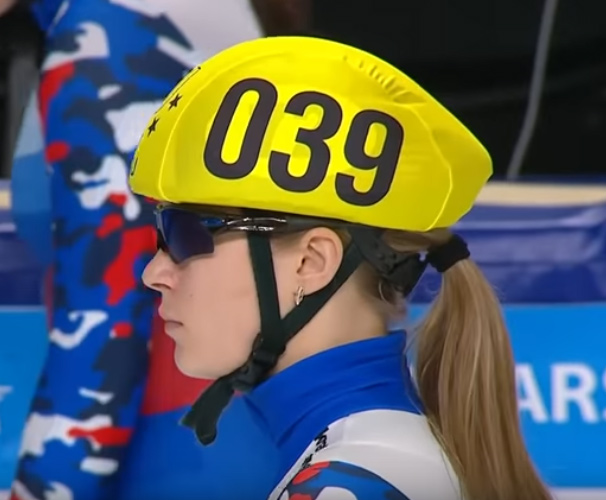
- Evgeniya Zakharova, in speed skating short track 1500m, 29th Winter Universiade (2019), Krasnoyarsk, Russia

Personal information
- Born: 4 October 1994 (age 31) Novouralsk, Russia

Sport
- Country: Russia
- Sport: Short track speed skating
Medal record
Women's short track speed skating
Representing Russia
World Championships
Bronze medal – third place	2016 Seoul	3000 m relay
European Championships
Gold medal – first place	2015 Dordrecht	3000 m relay
Silver medal – second place	2016 Sochi	3000 m relay
Silver medal – second place	2019 Dordrecht	3000 m relay
Bronze medal – third place	2020 Debrecen	3000 m relay
Winter Universiade
Gold medal – first place	2019 Krasnoyarsk	3000 m relay
Silver medal – second place	2013 Trentino	3000 m relay

Evgeniya Sergeevna Zakharova (Russian: Евгения Сергеевна Захарова; born 4 October 1994) is a Russian short track speed skater.

Zakharova represents Russia at international competitions. She won the bronze medal at the 2020 European Short Track Speed Skating Championships in the 3000m relay event, where she only competed in the preliminaries.
