= Veronika Windisch =

Austrian short track speed skater (born 1982)

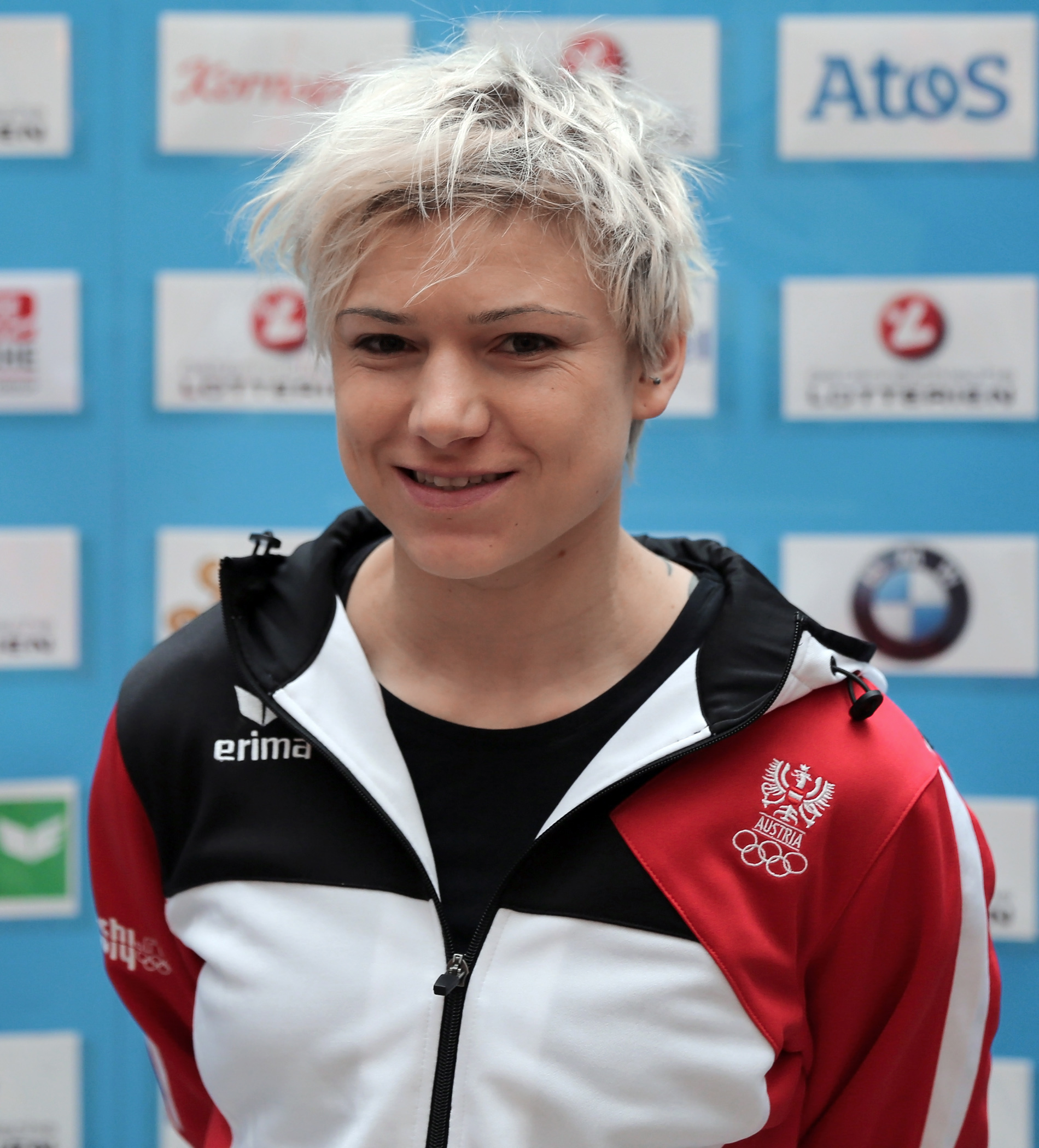
- Windisch in 2014

Personal information
- Born: 9 April 1982 (age 44) Graz, Austria
- Height: 1.62 m (5 ft 4 in)
- Weight: 56 kg (123 lb)
Medal record
Women's short track speed skating
Representing Austria
European Championships
Silver medal – second place	2011 Heerenveen	1500 m
Silver medal – second place	2011 Heerenveen	3000 m

Veronika Windisch (born 9 April 1982) is an Austrian multi-sport athlete, best known for as a short track speed skater. She has also competed at the national level or above in ice cross downhill, inline speed skating, and track cycling.

== Career results ==
2017
National Track Cycling Championships

2nd Sprint
2nd 500m Time Trial

2022–23
Ice cross downhill

Women's Championships
1st - 1000 points
