= Véronique Pierron =

French speed skater (born 1989)

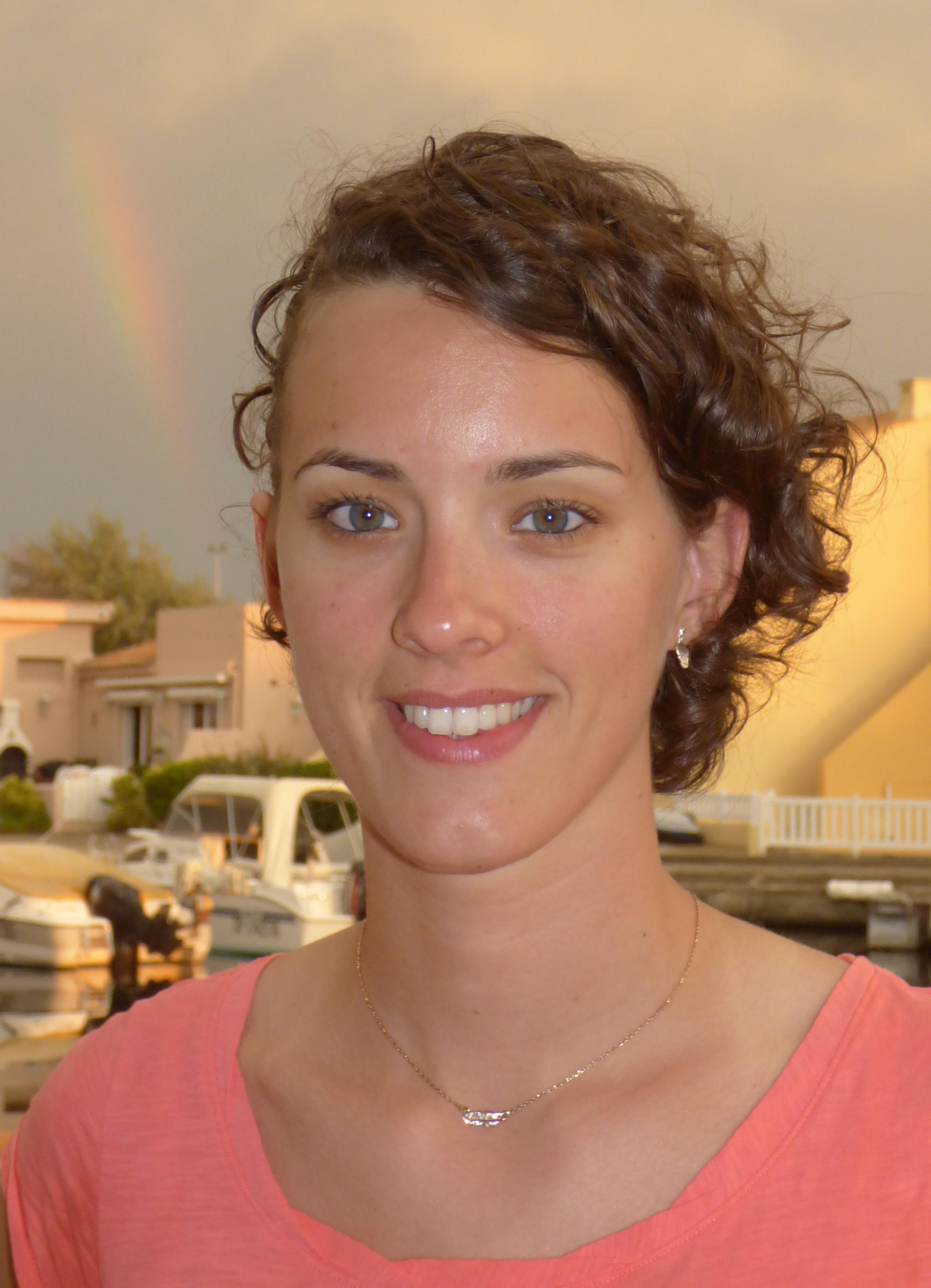

Personal information
- Born: 22 July 1989 (age 36) Sedan, France
- Height: 5 ft 8 in (173 cm)
- Weight: 137 lb (62 kg)

Sport
- Country: France
- Sport: Short track speed skating

Achievements and titles
- Highest world ranking: 9 (1000m)

Véronique Pierron (born 22 July 1989 in Sedan) is a French short-track speed-skater.

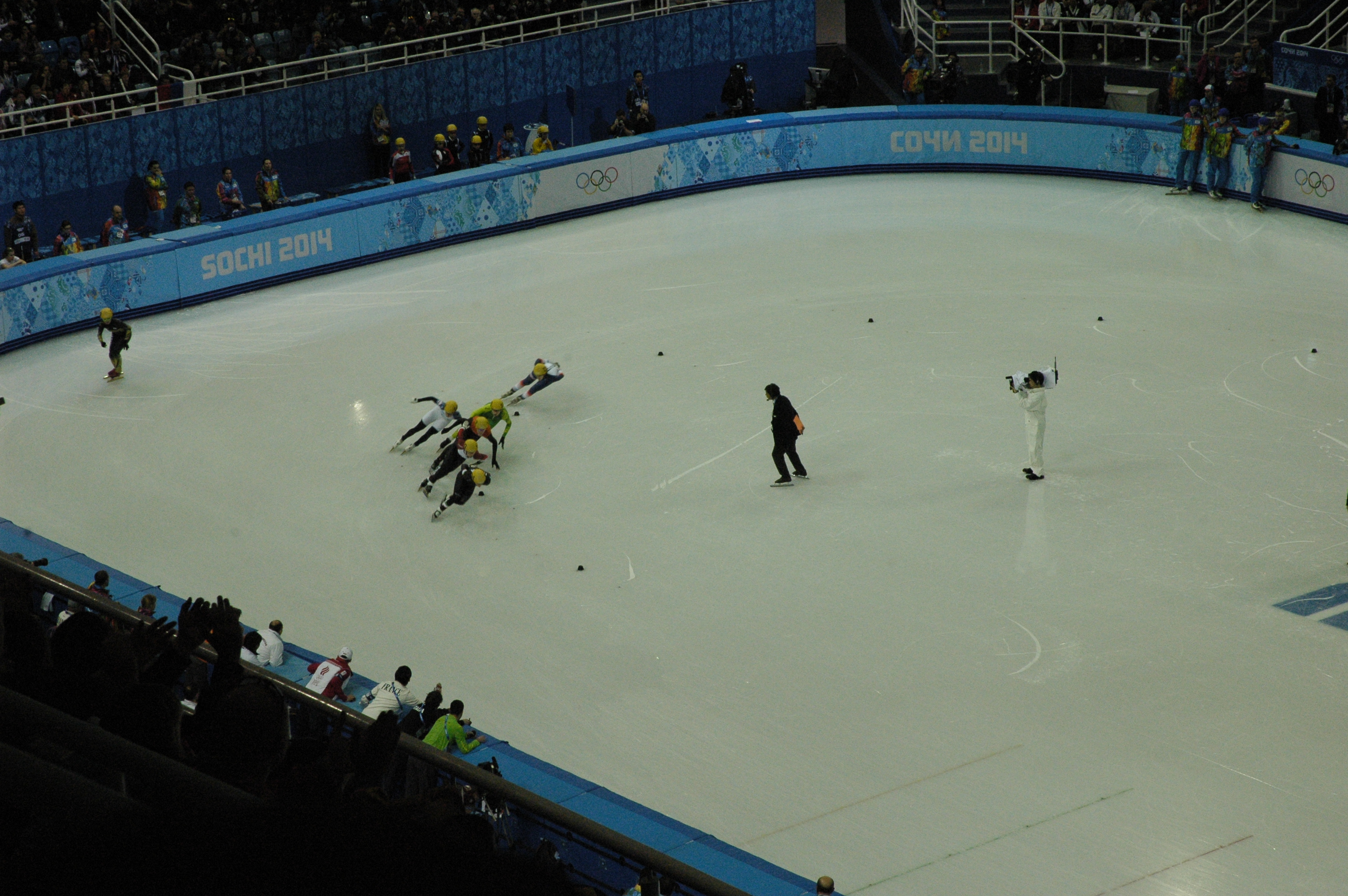
Pierron competing at the 2014 Winter Olympics.

Pierron competed at the 2010 Winter Olympics for France. She finished second in the first round of the 500 metres, advancing to the quarterfinals, where she finished fourth, failing to advance. She placed 14th overall.

As of 2013, Pierron's best finish at the World Championships is 6th, in the 1500 metres in 2012.

As of 2013, Pierron has not finished on the podium on the ISU Short Track Speed Skating World Cup. Her top World Cup ranking is 9th, in the 1000 metres in 2011–12.
