= Jessica Smith (speed skater) =

American short track speed skater and speed skater

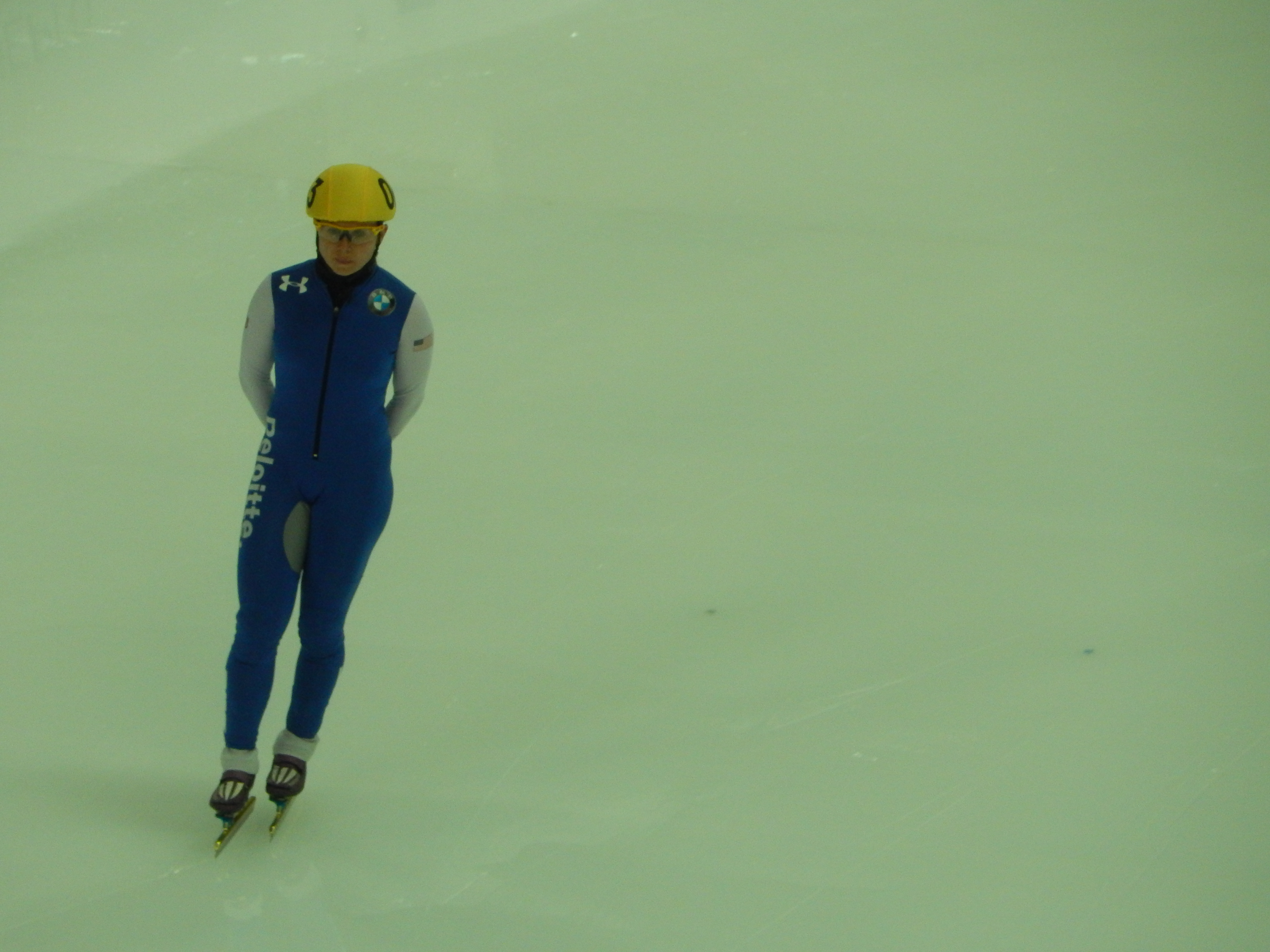

Personal information
- Nickname: Jessie
- Born: October 14, 1983 (age 43) Dearborn, Michigan
- Height: 5 ft 0 in (152 cm)
- Weight: 117 lb (53 kg)

Sport
- Country: United States
- Sport: Short track speed skating
- Coached by: Jae Su Chun
Medal record
Women's short track speed skating
Representing United States
World Championships
| Silver medal – second place | 2012 Shanghai | 3000 m relay |
| Silver medal – second place | 2014 Montreal | 3000 m |
World Team Championships
| Bronze medal – third place | 2009 Heerenveen | Team |
| Bronze medal – third place | 2011 Warsaw | Team |

Jessica Smith (born October 14, 1983) is an American long track speed skater and short track speed skater and former World Champion inline speed skater. As a young girl, Smith was involved in a variety of activities including ballet, modeling, roller skating, and ice hockey. She eventually settled on roller skating and made the United States' Junior World Inline Championships Team at age 12. She won 15 gold medals at the junior level before moving up the senior level at age 16. By 2007, Smith had collected 16 senior World Championships gold medals.

After 2007, Smith switched to short track speed skating on the ice in hopes of making the Olympics. She made the US World Cup team each year from 2008–10. She made the 2009 World Championships, but narrowly missed the 2010 Olympics. After the disappointment, Smith rededicated herself to the sport and made the 2011 and 2012 World Cup and World Championships teams. She won a bronze at the 2011 World Team Championships and a silver at the 2012 World Championships. When national coach Jae Su Chun was dismissed from the team in 2012, Smith stayed with him, forgoing support from the national team.

Smith made the US World Cup and World Championships Teams in 2013. At the 2014 Olympic Trials, she won all three events. As of 2014, Smith holds the US National Record in the 500 meters and has won twelve World Cup medals.

== Early life ==
Jessica Smith was born in Dearborn, Michigan to parents Rick and Reina Smith. She began roller skating at age one, competing in her first race at age two. In addition to skating, Smith took ballet and tap dancing lessons, and modeled. Staying scrape and injury free while skating proved to be too much of a burden, so she dropped ballet, dance, and modeling. She began to play ice hockey while continuing to roller skate. After inline skating and playing hockey competitively for several years, she decided to concentrate on inline to see how far she could take it, citing a preference for individual sports over team sports.

Smith grew up in Melvindale, Michigan, a suburb of Detroit. She graduated from Cabrini High School in Allen Park, Michigan.

== Skating career ==
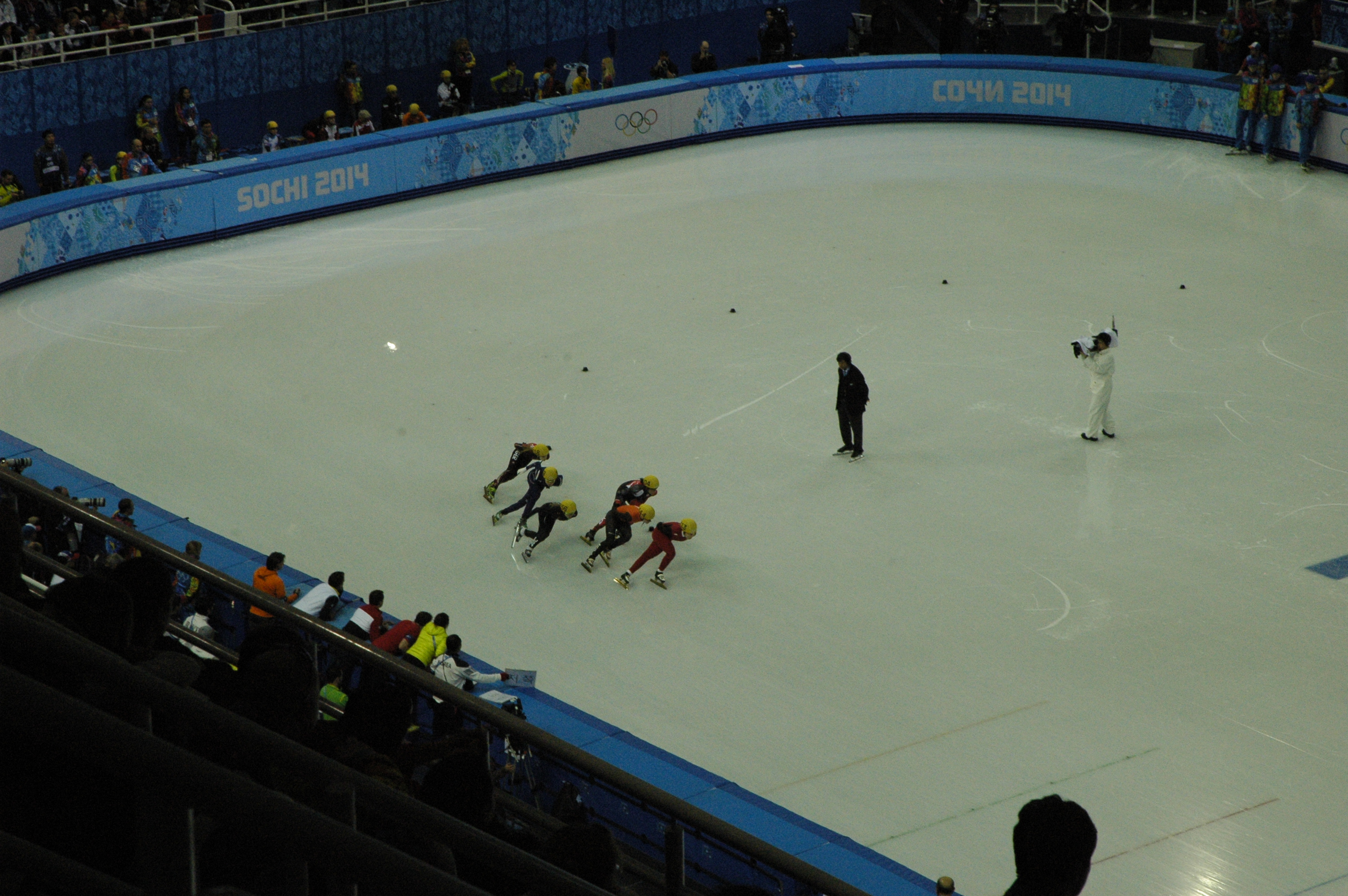
Smith competing at the 2014 Winter Olympics

Smith was coached by her father until age nine when family friend, Rob Dunn, took over. She would remain with Dunn until she gave up inline in 2007. At age twelve, Smith became the youngest inline skater to make a Junior World Team. Over the next three years, she collected 15 gold medals at the junior level. At sixteen, she made the Senior World Team. She collected 16 senior gold medals over the next few years, wrapping up her inline career with a Pan American Gold Medal in 2007. At the 2007 Inline World Championships, she suffered a shoulder injury that required surgery.

After 2007, Smith transitioned to short track speed skating. It was a tough decision – she was making a living as an inline skater and transitioning would require that she move away from her family in Metro Detroit for the first time. But, winning and making money was not enough for Smith so she make the switch. "I decided to pursue my final goal and dream of becoming an Olympian," she explained. "The only way to do it was to make the switch". She moved to Salt Lake City and joined Derek Parra's Wheels on Ice Program. According to Smith, the transition from an elite athlete in inline to a beginner in short track was difficult and "humbling".

Smith briefly moved to Milwaukee to try long track speed skating, but did not like it. "If you put me next to someone, I can outrace [them]," she explained. "But if you put me on the line by myself, I just can’t pull it together." She returned to Utah where national short track coach Jae Su Chun saw something in Smith that made him believe she could be elite.

Under Chun's guidance, Smith improved quickly. She made the 2008, 2009, and 2010 World Cup Teams, and participated in the 2009 World Championships. At the 2009 World Team Championships, Smith helped the United States place third. However, Smith narrowly missed the 2010 Olympic team. "I was a little devastated," she recalled. "[I had] always achieved [my goals] ... I was feeling good about making that team in 2010, but I fell short." She was selected as an alternate, did not compete. A week after the Olympics, Smith had a World Cup meet. She came from behind in every round of the 1000 meters to make the finals. In the finals, she won bronze. Smith later called the meet the most memorable of her career, saying "I didn’t give up on myself ...[and] reminded myself that I am a champion."

Smith rededicated herself to the sport and made both the US World Cup and World Championships Teams in 2011 and 2012. She won a bronze at the 2011 World Team Championships and a silver in the 3000 meter relay at the 2012 World Championships. When Chun was accused of mental and physical abuse later in 2012 and forced out, Smith chose to leave the national program and stay with Chun, feeling it was too close to the Olympics to change coaches. "It wasn't a difficult decision," Smith remarked. "I needed to have him behind me [because] he's the best technical coach I've ever seen." The decision meant that she would receive no financial support from the United States, relying instead on her personal savings and any sponsorship money she could find.

Smith again made the US World Cup and World Championships Teams in 2013. She opened the 2014 Olympic Trials by winning the overall point standings in the 1500 meters. She credited Chun for the win, which secured her a spot in the Olympics. Smith went on to win the 500 meter and 1000 meter events, completing a Trials sweep. Just prior to the start of the Olympics, she revealed that she had a torn quadriceps muscle, but said it was not bothering her.

As of 2014, Smith holds the US National Record in the 500 meters. She has twelve World Cup medals to date – two gold, five silver, and five bronze.

== Personal life ==
Smith's father, Rick, works as a truck driver. Her mother, Reina, is a part-time barber. She has a brother, Travis, who is 14 years her junior. Smith's family is not wealthy, but was able to join her in Sochi, Russia, site of the 2014 Olympics, with the help of community fundraisers.

Smith is married to Michael Kooreman, a former speed skater and current speed skating coach. Kooreman is also responsible for preparing Smith's skating blades for competition. No date has been set for the wedding.

When she is not skating, Smith enjoys shopping, watching movies, and playing golf. She lists speed skater Jennifer Rodriguez as her hero, and her parents as the most influential people in her life. Smith is pursuing a degree in business management from Ashworth College as of 2014. When she retires from speed skating, she plans to work in real estate. She has a mortgage license in Wisconsin. Smith has also spent time volunteering with Play Well Play Safe.
