= Deanna Lockett =

Australian short track speed skater

Personal information
- Born: 13 November 1995 (age 30) Brisbane, Queensland
- Height: 163 cm (5 ft 4 in)
- Weight: 48 kg (106 lb)
- Parent: Leah Lockett (mother)

Sport
- Country: Australia
- Sport: Short track speed skating
- Events: 1000m and 1500m
- Club: Olympic Southern Flyers
- Coached by: Ann Zhang/Jae Su Chun

Achievements and titles
- Olympic finals: 9th place 1000m
Medal record
New Zealand Winter Games
Silver medal – second place	2011 Dunedin	Relay
Bronze medal – third place	2011 Dunedin	500 m
Bronze medal – third place	2011 Dunedin	1000 m
Bronze medal – third place	2011 Dunedin	1500 m
World Junior Championships
Bronze medal – third place	2013	1500m

Deanna Lockett (born 13 November 1995) is an Australian short track speed skater who competed in the 2014 and 2018 Winter Olympics.

Lockett competed in the International Skating Union 2012–13 Speed Skating World Cup, coming 5th in the 1,500 metres (4,900 ft) World Cup in Nagoya, Japan and 4th in the 1,000 metres (3,300 ft) in Shanghai, China.

Lockett also competed in the 2013 Junior World Championships, winning a bronze medal in the 1,500 metres (4,900 ft) speed skate. She also placed 6th in the 500 metres (1,600 ft) and 9th in the 1,000 metres (3,300 ft). Her combined results gave her an overall 4th place in the event.

In December 2016, Lockett was named to Australia's team for the 2017 Asian Winter Games in Sapporo, Japan.

In May 2019, Lockett earned Hungarian citizenship, and with the start of 2019–2020 season she became part of the Hungarian short-track skating team.
