= Agnė Sereikaitė =

Lithuanian speed skater (born 1994)

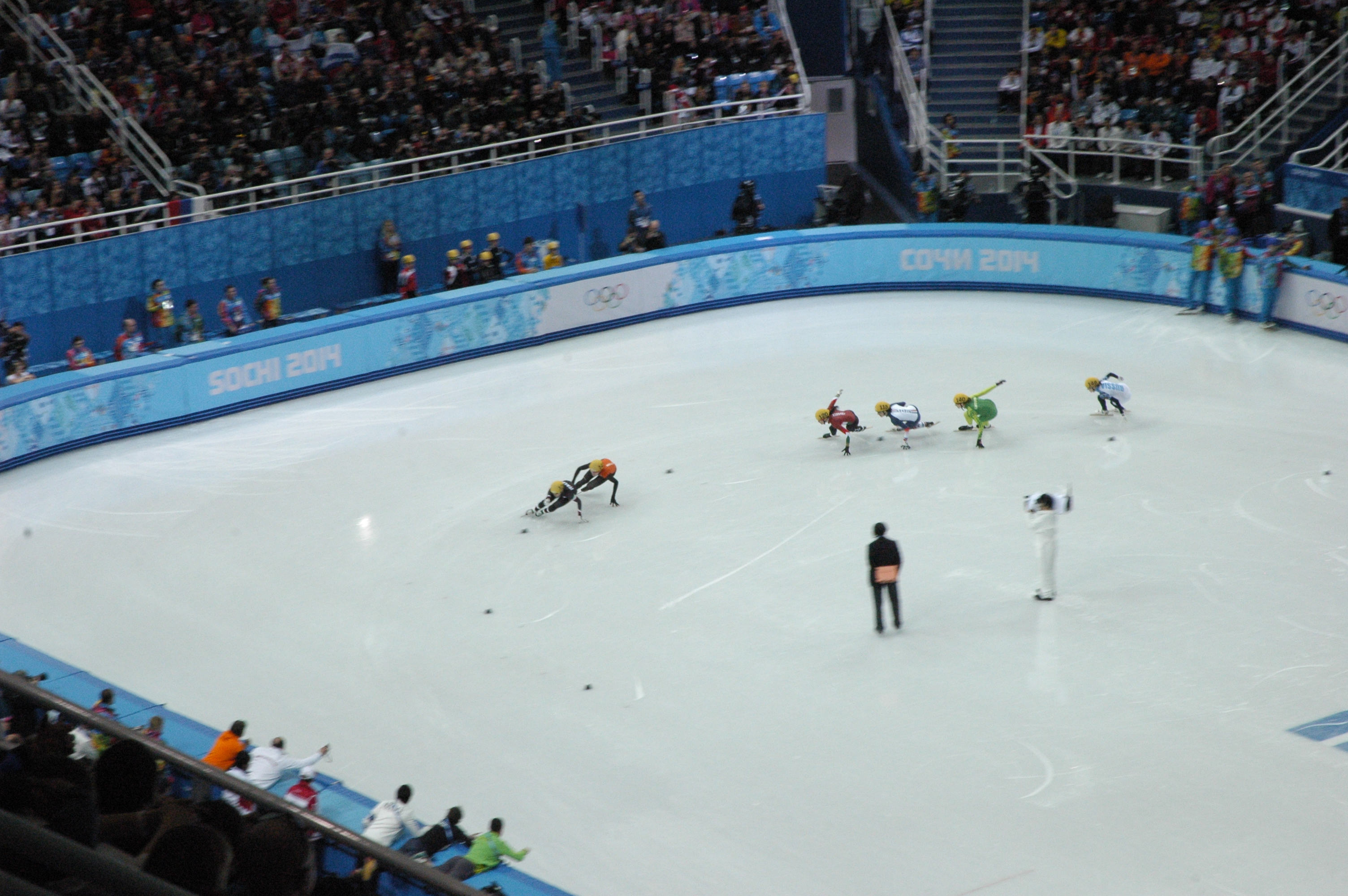
- Sereikaitė competing at the 2014 Winter Olympics

Personal information
- Born: October 19, 1994 (age 31) Vilnius, Lithuania
Medal record
Women's short track speed skating
Representing Lithuania
European Championships
Bronze medal – third place	2015 Dordrecht	1000 m
World Junior Championships
Silver medal – second place	2012 Melbourne	500 m
Winter Universiade
Bronze medal – third place	2013 Trentino	500 m
Bronze medal – third place	2015 Granada	500 m

Agnė Sereikaitė (born 19 October 1994 in Vilnius, Lithuania) is a Lithuanian short track speed skater.

In the 2014 Winter Olympics Sereikaitė participated in all three individual events and became the first Lithuanian short track skater to qualify. She finished 24th at 500 meter distance. She was penalized at the 1000 meter distance and reached the semifinals of the 1500 meter event, where she broke her personal record by almost 5 seconds and finished 16th overall. She was the Lithuanian flag bearer at the closing ceremony.

In October 2018 Sreikaitė announced her retirement from competitive sport.
