= 2011–12 ISU Short Track Speed Skating World Cup =

International speed skating competition

ISU Short Track World Cup
- Dates: 2011–2012

The 2011–12 ISU Short Track Speed Skating World Cup was a multi-race tournament over a season for short track speed skating. The season began on 22 October 2011 and ended on 12 February 2012. The World Cup was organised by the International Skating Union (ISU) who also ran world cups and championships in speed skating and figure skating.

== Calendar ==
=== Men ===
==== Salt Lake City ====
Date	Place	Distance	Winner	Second	Third	Reference
23 October 2011	Utah Olympic Oval	500m	Jon Eley (GBR)	Charles Hamelin (CAN)	Evgenii Kozulin (RUS)	
22 October 2011	Utah Olympic Oval	1000m	Kwak Yoon-Gy (KOR)	Noh Jin-Kyu (KOR)	François-Louis Tremblay (CAN)	
22 October 2011	Utah Olympic Oval	1500m (1)	Charles Hamelin (CAN)	Lee Ho-Suk (KOR)	Lee Jung-Su (KOR)	
23 October 2011	Utah Olympic Oval	1500m (2)	Noh Jin-Kyu (KOR)	Kwak Yoon-Gy (KOR)	J. R. Celski (USA)	
23 October 2011	Utah Olympic Oval	5000m relay	Canada	Great Britain	South Korea	

==== Saguenay ====
Date	Place	Distance	Winner	Second	Third	Reference
29 October 2011	Centre Georges-Vézina	500m (1)	Olivier Jean (CAN)	Charles Hamelin (CAN)	Vladimir Grigorev (RUS)	
30 October 2011	Centre Georges-Vézina	500m (2)	François-Louis Tremblay (CAN)	Guillaume Bastille (CAN)	Liang Wenhao (CHN)	
30 October 2011	Centre Georges-Vézina	1000m	Charles Hamelin (CAN)	Michael Gilday (CAN)	Olivier Jean (CAN)	
29 October 2011	Centre Georges-Vézina	1500m	Noh Jin-Kyu (KOR)	Kwak Yoon-Gy (KOR)	Yuzo Takamido (JPN)	
30 October 2011	Centre Georges-Vézina	5000m relay	South Korea	Russia	Canada	

==== Nagoya ====
Date	Place	Distance	Winner	Second	Third	Reference
4 December 2011	Nippon Gaishi Hall	500m	Olivier Jean (CAN)	Liang Wenhao (CHN)	Gong Qiuwen (CHN)	
3 December 2011	Nippon Gaishi Hall	1000m (1)	Kwak Yoon-Gy (KOR)	J. R. Celski (USA)	Seo Yi-Ra (KOR)	
4 December 2011	Nippon Gaishi Hall	1000m (2)	Charles Hamelin (CAN)	Kwak Yoon-Gy (KOR)	Michael Gilday (CAN)	
3 December 2011	Nippon Gaishi Hall	1500m	Noh Jin-Kyu (KOR)	Lee Ho-Suk (KOR)	Charle Cournoyer (CAN)	
4 December 2011	Nippon Gaishi Hall	5000m relay	China	Russia	Japan	

==== Shanghai ====
Date	Place	Distance	Winner	Second	Third	Reference
10 December 2011	Shanghai Oriental Sports Center	500m (1)	Olivier Jean (CAN)	Gong Qiuwen (CHN)	Daan Breeuwsma (NED)	
11 December 2011	Shanghai Oriental Sports Center	500m (2)	Charles Hamelin (CAN)	Jon Eley (GBR)	Liang Wenhao (CHN)	
11 December 2011	Shanghai Oriental Sports Center	1000m	Kwak Yoon-Gy (KOR)	Olivier Jean (CAN)	Noh Jin-Kyu (KOR)	
10 December 2011	Shanghai Oriental Sports Center	1500m	Noh Jin-Kyu (KOR)	Charles Hamelin (CAN)	Kwak Yoon-Gy (KOR)	
11 December 2011	Shanghai Oriental Sports Center	5000m relay	China	Canada	United Kingdom	

==== Moscow ====
Date	Place	Distance	Winner	Second	Third	Reference
5 February 2012	Megasport Arena	500m	Olivier Jean (CAN)	Liam McFarlane (CAN)	Charles Hamelin (CAN)	
4 February 2012	Megasport Arena	1000m	Kwak Yoon-Gy (KOR)	Noh Jin-Kyu (KOR)	Liang Wenhao (CHN)	
4 February 2012	Megasport Arena	1500m (1)	Lee Jung-Su (KOR)	John-Henry Krueger (USA)	Lee Ho-Suk (KOR)	
5 February 2012	Megasport Arena	1500m (2)	Noh Jin-Kyu (KOR)	Sin Da-woon (KOR)	J. R. Celski (USA)	
5 February 2012	Megasport Arena	5000m relay	Canada	South Korea	China	

==== Dordrecht ====
Date	Place (Note: Location to be confirmed)	Distance	Winner	Second	Third	Reference
12 February 2011	Sportboulevard Dordrecht	500m	Simon Cho (USA)	Kwak Yoon-Gy (KOR)	Francois Louis-Tremblay (CAN)	
11 February 2011	Sportboulevard Dordrecht	1000m (1)	Guillaume Bastille (CAN)	Sjinkie Knegt (NED)	Niels Kerstholt (NED)	
12 February 2011	Sportboulevard Dordrecht	1000m (2)	Noh Jinkyu (KOR)	Olivier Jean (CAN)	J. R. Celski (USA)	
11 February 2011	Sportboulevard Dordrecht	1500m	Noh Jinkyu (KOR)	Sin Da-woon (KOR)	Semen Elistratov (RUS)	
12 February 2011	Sportboulevard Dordrecht	5000m relay	Netherlands	Canada	South Korea	

=== Women ===
==== Salt Lake City ====
Date	Place	Distance	Winner	Second	Third	Reference
23 October 2011	Utah Olympic Oval	500m	Marianne St-Gelais (CAN)	Martina Valcepina (ITA)	Jessica Smith (USA)	
22 October 2011	Utah Olympic Oval	1000m	Yui Sakai (JPN)	Lana Gehring (USA)	Alyson Dudek (USA)	
22 October 2011	Utah Olympic Oval	1500m (1)	Katherine Reutter (USA)	Valérie Maltais (CAN)	Lee Eun-Byul (KOR)	
23 October 2011	Utah Olympic Oval	1500m (2)	Katherine Reutter (USA)	Lee Eun-Byul (KOR)	Li Jianrou (CHN)	
23 October 2011	Utah Olympic Oval	3000m relay	China	South Korea	Russia	

==== Saguenay ====
Date	Place	Distance	Winner	Second	Third	Reference
29 October 2011	Centre Georges-Vézina	500m (1)	Marianne St-Gelais (CAN)	Martina Valcepina (ITA)	Liu Qiuhong (CHN)	
30 October 2011	Centre Georges-Vézina	500m (2)	Arianna Fontana (ITA)	Martina Valcepina (ITA)	Liu Qiuhong (CHN)	
30 October 2011	Centre Georges-Vézina	1000m	Marianne St-Gelais (CAN)	Elise Christie (GBR)	Cho Ha-Ri (KOR)	
29 October 2011	Centre Georges-Vézina	1500m	Arianna Fontana (ITA)	Lee Eun-Byul (KOR)	Cho Ha-Ri (KOR)	
30 October 2011	Centre Georges-Vézina	3000m relay	China	Canada	Japan	

==== Nagoya ====
Date	Place	Distance	Winner	Second	Third	Reference
4 December 2011	Nippon Gaishi Hall	500m	Arianna Fontana (ITA)	Yui Sakai (JPN)	Martina Valcepina (ITA)	
3 December 2011	Nippon Gaishi Hall	1000m (1)	Yui Sakai (JPN)	Elise Christie (GBR)	Katherine Reutter (USA)	
4 December 2011	Nippon Gaishi Hall	1000m (2)	Li Jianrou (CHN)	Lin Meng (CHN)	Xiao Han (CHN)	
3 December 2011	Nippon Gaishi Hall	1500m	Arianna Fontana (ITA)	Cho Ha-Ri (KOR)	Lana Gehring (USA)	
4 December 2011	Nippon Gaishi Hall	3000m relay	Italy	Japan	China	

==== Shanghai ====
Date	Place	Distance	Winner	Second	Third	Reference
10 December 2011	Shanghai Oriental Sports Center	500m (1)	Fan Kexin (CHN)	Liu Qiuhong (CHN)	Jessica Smith (USA)	
11 December 2011	Shanghai Oriental Sports Center	500m (2)	Arianna Fontana (ITA)	Liu Qiuhong (CHN)	Fan Kexin (CHN)	
11 December 2011	Shanghai Oriental Sports Center	1000m	Katherine Reutter (USA)	Li Jianrou (CHN)	Yui Sakai (JPN)	
10 December 2011	Shanghai Oriental Sports Center	1500m	Cho Ha-Ri (KOR)	Katherine Reutter (USA)	Xiao Han (CHN)	
11 December 2011	Shanghai Oriental Sports Center	3000m relay	China	United States	Japan	

==== Moscow ====
Date	Place	Distance	Winner	Second	Third	Reference
5 February 2012	Megasport Arena	500m	Fan Kexin (CHN)	Arianna Fontana (ITA)	Liu Qiuhong (CHN)	
4 February 2012	Megasport Arena	1000m	Elise Christie (GBR)	Liu Qiuhong (CHN)	Yui Sakai (JPN)	
4 February 2012	Megasport Arena	1500m (1)	Cho Ha-Ri (KOR)	Lee Eun-Byul (KOR)	Valérie Maltais (CAN)	
5 February 2012	Megasport Arena	1500m (2)	Lee Eun-Byul (KOR)	Cho Ha-Ri (KOR)	Lana Gehring (USA)	
5 February 2012	Megasport Arena	3000m relay	China	United States	Netherlands	

==== Dordrecht ====
Date	Place	Distance	Winner	Second	Third	Reference
12 February 2011	Sportboulevard Dordrecht	500m	Arianna Fontana (ITA)	Marianne St-Gelais (CAN)	Martina Valcepina (ITA)	
11 February 2011	Sportboulevard Dordrecht	1000m (1)	Marianne St-Gelais (CAN)	Jorien Ter Mors (NED)	Liu Qiuhong (CHN)	
12 February 2011	Sportboulevard Dordrecht	1000m (2)	Lana Gehring (USA)	Marie-Ève Drolet (CAN)	Li Jianrou (CHN)	
11 February 2011	Sportboulevard Dordrecht	1500m	Lana Gehring (USA)	Cho Ha-Ri (KOR)	Fan Kexin (CHN)	
12 February 2011	Sportboulevard Dordrecht	3000m relay	China	United States	Japan	

== World Cup standings ==
* Note – Standings are calculated on the best 6 out of 8 results for the individual distances

=== Men's 500 metres ===
After 8 of 8 events

Pos	Athlete	Points
1.	Olivier Jean (CAN)	4000
2.	Charles Hamelin (CAN)	3240
3.	Liang Wenhao (CHN)	2970
5.	Gong Qiuwen (CHN)	2798
4.	Jon Eley (GBR)	2719

=== Women's 500 metres ===
After 8 of 8 events

Pos	Athlete	Points
1.	Arianna Fontana (ITA)	4800
2.	Martina Valcepina (ITA)	3942
3.	Liu Qiuhong (CHN)	3930
4.	Fan Kexin (CHN)	3690
5.	Marianne St-Gelais (CAN)	3312

=== Men's 1000 metres ===
After 8 of 8 events

Pos	Athlete	Points
1.	Kwak Yoon-Gy (KOR)	5312
2.	Noh Jin-Kyu (KOR)	3896
3.	Olivier Jean (CAN)	3264
4.	Charles Hamelin (CAN)	2000
5.	J. R. Celski (USA)	1996

=== Women's 1000 metres ===
After 8 of 8 events

Pos	Athlete	Points
1.	Yui Sakai (JPN)	4202
2.	Li Jianrou (CHN)	3312
3.	Elise Christie (GBR)	3230
4.	Lana Gehring (USA)	3152
5.	Marianne St-Gelais (CAN)	2169

=== Men's 1500 metres ===
After 8 of 8 events

Pos	Athlete	Points
1.	Noh Jinkyu (KOR)	6000
2.	Sin Da-woon (KOR)	3280
3.	Kwak Yoon-Gy (KOR)	2978
4.	Lee Ho-Suk (KOR)	2240
5.	Charles Hamelin (CAN)	2088

=== Women's 1500 metres ===
After 8 of 8 events

Pos	Athlete	Points
1.	Cho Ha-Ri (KOR)	5040
2.	Lee Eun-Byul (KOR)	4302
3.	Lana Gehring (USA)	2952
4.	Katherine Reutter (USA)	2800
5.	Valérie Maltais (CAN)	2632

=== Men's 5000 metre relay ===
After 6 of 6 events

Pos	Athlete	Points
1.	Canada	3600
2.	South Korea	3080
3.	China	2968
3.	Russia	2522
5.	Great Britain	2362

=== Women's 3000 metre relay ===
After 6 of 6 events

Pos	Athlete	Points
1.	China	4000
2.	United States	2810
3.	Japan	2720
4.	Italy	2230
5.	Canada	2086

== Podium summary ==
Rank	Nation	Gold	Silver	Bronze	Total
1	South Korea (KOR)	16	18	10	44
2	Canada (CAN)	16	14	8	38
3	China (CHN)	10	7	16	33
4	Italy (ITA)	7	4	2	13
5	United States (USA)	6	7	9	22
6	Great Britain (GBR)	2	4	1	7
7	Japan (JPN)	2	2	7	11
8	Netherlands (NED)	1	2	3	6
9	Russia (RUS)	0	2	4	6
Totals (9 entries)		60	60	60	180

== See also ==
- 2012 World Short Track Speed Skating Championships
- 2012 European Short Track Speed Skating Championships
