= 2011 World Short Track Speed Skating Championships – Women's 500 metres =

The women's 500 metre at the 2011 World Short Track Speed Skating Championships took place 12 March at the Sheffield Arena.

== Results ==
=== Heats ===
Top two athletes from each heat and the next four fastest thirds qualified for heats.

Heat 1

Rank	Athlete	Country	Time	Notes
1	Fan Kexin	China	44.948	Q
2	Yui Sakai	Japan	45.033	Q
3	Szandra Lajtos	Hungary	46.268	q
4	Yang Shin-young	South Korea	46.858	

Heat 3

Rank	Athlete	Country	Time	Notes
1	Katherine Reutter	United States	45.152	Q
2	Martina Valcepina	Italy	45.925	Q
3	Annita van Doorn	Netherlands	1:02.485	
4	Bernadett Heidum	Hungary	1:30.943	

Heat 5

Rank	Athlete	Country	Time	Notes
1	Marianne St-Gelais	Canada	45.425	Q
2	Park Seung-Hi	South Korea	45.448	Q
3	Lana Gehring	United States	1:19.514	
4	Patrycja Maliszewska	Poland	1:21.624	

Heat 2

Rank	Athlete	Country	Time	Notes
1	Jessica Hewitt	Canada	45.549	Q
2	Li Jianrou	China	45.579	Q
3	Jorien ter Mors	Netherlands	45.722	q
4	Marina Georgieva-Nikolova	Bulgaria	45.970	

Heat 4

Rank	Athlete	Country	Time	Notes
1	Liu Qiuhong	China	45.157	Q
2	Cho Ha-Ri	South Korea	45.573	Q
3	Kateřina Novotná	Czech Republic	45.779	q
4	Vera Antanenka	Belarus	47.183	

Heat 6

Rank	Athlete	Country	Time	Notes
1	Arianna Fontana	Italy	45.408	Q
2	Marie-Ève Drolet	Canada	45.527	Q
3	Bianca Walter	Germany	46.777	q
4	Olga Belyakova	Russia	47.213	

=== Quarterfinals ===
Top two athletes from each heat qualified for semifinals.

Heat 1

Rank	Athlete	Country	Time	Notes
1	Liu Qiuhong	China	44.776	Q
2	Katherine Reutter	United States	44.858	Q
3	Martina Valcepina	Italy	44.893	
4	Jessica Hewitt	Canada	45.091	

Heat 3

Rank	Athlete	Country	Time	Notes
1	Park Seung-Hi	South Korea	45.488	Q
2	Marie-Ève Drolet	Canada	45.589	Q
3	Kateřina Novotná	Czech Republic	46.101	
4	Bianca Walter	Germany	46.686	

Heat 2

Rank	Athlete	Country	Time	Notes
1	Fan Kexin	China	44.765	Q
2	Marianne St-Gelais	Canada	45.057	Q
3	Yui Sakai	Japan	45.183	
4	Cho Ha-Ri	South Korea	49.036	

Heat 4

Rank	Athlete	Country	Time	Notes
1	Arianna Fontana	Italy	45.347	Q
2	Li Jianrou	China	45.463	Q
3	Jorien ter Mors	Netherlands	45.612	
4	Szandra Lajtos	Hungary	45.873	

=== Semifinals ===
Top two athletes from each heat qualified for final.

Heat 1

Rank	Athlete	Country	Time	Notes
1	Liu Qiuhong	China	45.076	Q
2	Li Jianrou	China	45.174	Q
3	Katherine Reutter	United States	45.181	
4	Marie-Ève Drolet	Canada	45.473	

Heat 2

Rank	Athlete	Country	Time	Notes
1	Fan Kexin	China	44.975	Q
2	Arianna Fontana	Italy	45.082	Q
3	Park Seung-Hi	South Korea	45.190	
4	Marianne St-Gelais	Canada	1:13.133	

=== Final ===
Rank	Athlete	Country	Time	Notes
1st place, gold medalist(s)	Fan Kexin	China	44.620	
2nd place, silver medalist(s)	Arianna Fontana	Italy	44.687	
3rd place, bronze medalist(s)	Liu Qiuhong	China	44.784	
4	Li Jianrou	China	44.879	
