= 2011 World Short Track Speed Skating Championships – Women's 3000 metre relay =

The women's 3000 metre relay at the 2011 World Short Track Speed Skating Championships began on 11 March, and ended on 13 March at the Sheffield Arena.

The top eight teams from the World Cup season competed.

== Results ==
=== Semifinals ===
Top 2 teams from each heat qualify the final.

Heat 1

Rank	Country	Athlete	Time	Notes
1	Canada	Marie-Ève Drolet; Jessica Hewitt; Valérie Maltais; Marianne St-Gelais	4:21.922	Q
2	Netherlands	Jorien ter Mors; Annita van Doorn; Yara van Kerkhof; Sanne van Kerkhof	4:24.093	Q
3	Japan	Ayuko Ito; Yuki Sakai; Biba Sakurai; Sayuri Shimizu	4:27.164	
4	United States	Lara Gehring; Katherine Reutter; Emily Scott; Jessica Smith	4:33.211	

Heat 2

Rank	Country	Athlete	Time	Notes
1	South Korea	Cho Ha-Ri; Kim Dam-Min; Park Seung-Hi; Yang Shin-young	4:23.797	Q
2	China	Li Jianrou; Liu Quihong; Xiao Han; Zhang Hui	4:23.996	Q
3	Italy	Elena Viviani; Martina Valcepina; Cecilia Maffei; Arianna Fontana	4:24.127	
4	Russia	Olga Belyakova; Nina Yevteyeva; Valeriya Poteminka; Lia Stepanova	4:24.994	

=== Final ===
Rank	Country	Athlete	Time	Notes
Gold medal	China	Li Jianrou; Liu Quihong; Fan Kexin; Zhang Hui	4:16.295	
Silver medal	Netherlands	Jorien ter Mors; Annita van Doorn; Yara van Kerkhof; Sanne van Kerkhof	4:17.725	
Bronze medal	Canada	Marie-Ève Drolet; Jessica Hewitt; Valérie Maltais; Marianne St-Gelais	4:18.043	
4	South Korea	Cho Ha-Ri; Hwang Hyun-Sun; Park Seung-Hi; Yang Shin-young	4:39.789	
