= 2012–13 ISU Short Track Speed Skating World Cup =

International speed skating competition

ISU Short Track World Cup
- Dates: 2012–13

The 2012–13 ISU Short Track Speed Skating World Cup was a multi-race tournament over a season for short track speed skating. The season began on 19 October 2012 and ended on 12 February 2013. The World Cup was organised by the ISU who also ran world cups and championships in speed skating and figure skating.

== Calendar ==
=== Men ===
==== Calgary ====
Date	Place	Distance	Winner	Second	Third	Reference
23 October 2012	Olympic Oval	500m	J. R. Celski (USA) WR	Charles Hamelin (CAN)	John-Henry Krueger (USA)	
22 October 2012	Olympic Oval	1000m (1)	Vladimir Grigorev (RUS)	Olivier Jean (CAN)	J. R. Celski (USA)	
22 October 2012	Olympic Oval	1000m (2)	Victor An (RUS)	Michael Gilday (CAN)	Kwak Yoon-Gy (KOR)	
23 October 2012	Olympic Oval	1500m	Noh Jinkyu (KOR)	Kwak Yoon-Gy (KOR)	Charles Hamelin (CAN)	
23 October 2012	Olympic Oval	5000m relay	South Korea	Russia	Canada	

==== Montreal ====
Date	Place	Distance	Winner	Second	Third	Reference
27 October 2012	Maurice Richard Arena	500m (1)	Liang Wenhao (CHN)	Charles Hamelin (CAN)	Olivier Jean (CAN)	
28 October 2012	Maurice Richard Arena	500m (2)	Guillaume Bastille (CAN)	Michael Gilday (CAN)	Liam McFarlane (CAN)	
28 October 2012	Maurice Richard Arena	1000m	Kwak Yoon-Gy (KOR)	Charles Hamelin (CAN)	Noh Jinkyu (KOR)	
27 October 2012	Maurice Richard Arena	1500m	Noh Jinkyu (KOR)	J. R. Celski (USA)	Semen Elistratov (RUS)	
28 October 2012	Maurice Richard Arena	5000m relay	South Korea	China	United States	

==== Nagoya ====
Date	Place	Distance	Winner	Second	Third	Reference
2 December 2012	Nippon Gaishi Hall	500m	Robert Seifert (GER)	Charles Hamelin (CAN)	Travis Jayner (USA)	
1 December 2012	Nippon Gaishi Hall	1000m	Victor An (RUS)	J. R. Celski (USA)	Noh Jin-kyu (KOR)	
1 December 2012	Nippon Gaishi Hall	1500m (1)	Kim Byeong-jun (KOR)	Sin Da-woon (KOR)	Charles Hamelin (CAN)	
2 December 2012	Nippon Gaishi Hall	1500m (2)	Noh Jin-kyu (KOR)	Sin Da-woon (KOR)	Sjinkie Knegt (NED)	
2 December 2012	Nippon Gaishi Hall	5000m relay	South Korea	Netherlands	China	

==== Shanghai ====
Date	Place	Distance	Winner	Second	Third	Reference
9 December 2012	Shanghai Oriental Sports Center	500m	Charles Hamelin (CAN)	Vladimir Grigorev (RUS)	Wu Dajing (CHN)	
8 December 2012	Shanghai Oriental Sports Center	1000m (1)	Kwak Yoon-Gy (KOR)	Liang Wenhao (CHN)	Niels Kerstholt (NED)	
9 December 2012	Shanghai Oriental Sports Center	1000m (2)	Kwak Yoon-Gy (KOR)	Victor An (RUS)	Noh Jinkyu (KOR)	
8 December 2012	Shanghai Oriental Sports Center	1500m	Victor An (RUS)	Noh Jinkyu (KOR)	Guillaume Bastille (CAN)	
9 December 2012	Shanghai Oriental Sports Center	5000m relay	South Korea	Netherlands	Canada	

==== Sochi ====
Date	Place	Distance	Winner	Second	Third	Reference
2 February 2013	Iceberg Skating Palace	500m (1)	Charles Hamelin (CAN)	Wu Dajing (CHN)	Vladimir Grigorev (RUS)	
3 February 2013	Iceberg Skating Palace	500m (2)	Wu Dajing (CHN)	Yu Jiyang (CHN)	Vladimir Grigorev (RUS)	
3 February 2013	Iceberg Skating Palace	1000m	Charles Hamelin (CAN)	Semen Elistratov (RUS)	J. R. Celski (USA)	
2 February 2013	Iceberg Skating Palace	1500m	Noh Jinkyu (KOR)	Kim Yun-Jae (KOR)	Kwak Yoon-Gy (KOR)	
3 February 2013	Iceberg Skating Palace	5000m relay	Russia	Netherlands	China	

==== Dresden ====
Date	Place	Distance	Winner	Second	Third	Reference
10 February 2013	EnergieVerbund Arena	500m	Liang Wenhao (CHN)	Wu Dajing (CHN)	Niels Kerstholt (NED)	
9 February 2013	EnergieVerbund Arena	1000m	Liang Wenhao (CHN)	Charle Cournoyer (CAN)	Victor An (RUS)	
9 February 2013	EnergieVerbund Arena	1500m (1)	Sin Da-Woon (KOR)	J. R. Celski (USA)	Guillaume Bastille (CAN)	
10 February 2013	EnergieVerbund Arena	1500m (2)	Noh Jinkyu (KOR)	Kim Yun-Jae (KOR)	Victor An (RUS)	
10 February 2013	EnergieVerbund Arena	5000m relay	South Korea	Netherlands	Russia	

=== Women ===
==== Calgary ====
Date	Place	Distance	Winner	Second	Third	Reference
23 October 2012	Olympic Oval	500m	Wang Meng (CHN)	Liu Qiuhong (CHN)	Arianna Fontana (ITA)	
22 October 2012	Olympic Oval	1000m (1)	Lee Soyoun (KOR)	Elise Christie (GBR)	Liu Qiuhong (CHN)	
22 October 2012	Olympic Oval	1000m (2)	Shim Suk Hee (KOR)	Marie-Ève Drolet (CAN)	Kim Min-Jung (KOR)	
23 October 2012	Olympic Oval	1500m	Shim Suk Hee (KOR)	Cho Ha-Ri (KOR)	Li Jianrou (CHN)	
23 October 2012	Olympic Oval	3000m relay	South Korea	China	Japan	

==== Montreal ====
Date	Place	Distance	Winner	Second	Third	Reference
27 October 2012	Maurice Richard Arena	500m (1)	Wang Meng (CHN)	Jessica Gregg (CAN)	Liu Qiuhong (CHN)	
28 October 2012	Maurice Richard Arena	500m (2)	Jessica Gregg (CAN)	Marianne St-Gelais (CAN)	Caroline Truchon (CAN)	
28 October 2012	Maurice Richard Arena	1000m	Valérie Maltais (CAN)	Elise Christie (GBR)	Cho Ha-Ri (KOR)	
27 October 2012	Maurice Richard Arena	1500m	Shim Suk Hee (KOR)	Cho Ha-Ri (KOR)	Li Jianrou (CHN)	
28 October 2012	Maurice Richard Arena	3000m relay	China	Canada	Japan	

==== Nagoya ====
Date	Place	Distance	Winner	Second	Third	Reference
2 December 2012	Nippon Gaishi Hall	500m	Wang Meng (CHN)	Liu Qiuhong (CHN)	Shim Suk Hee (KOR)	
1 December 2012	Nippon Gaishi Hall	1000m	Elise Christie (GBR)	Kim Min-Jung (KOR)	Lee Soyoun (KOR)	
1 December 2012	Nippon Gaishi Hall	1500m (1)	Shim Suk Hee (KOR)	Park Seung-Hi (KOR)	Cho Ha-Ri (KOR)	
2 December 2012	Nippon Gaishi Hall	1500m (2)	Lee Soyoun (KOR)	Elise Christie (GBR)	Kong Xue (CHN)	
2 December 2012	Nippon Gaishi Hall	3000m relay	China	South Korea	Japan	

==== Shanghai ====
Date	Place	Distance	Winner	Second	Third	Reference
9 December 2012	Shanghai Oriental Sports Center	500m	Wang Meng (CHN)	Fan Kexin (CHN)	Marianne St-Gelais (CAN)	
8 December 2012	Shanghai Oriental Sports Center	1000m (1)	Park Seung-Hi (KOR)	Wang Meng (CHN)	Elise Christie (GBR)	
9 December 2012	Shanghai Oriental Sports Center	1000m (2)	Shim Suk Hee (KOR)	Li Jianrou (CHN)	Kim Min-Jung (KOR)	
8 December 2012	Shanghai Oriental Sports Center	1500m	Shim Suk Hee (KOR)	Li Jianrou (CHN)	Cho Ha-Ri (KOR)	
9 December 2012	Shanghai Oriental Sports Center	3000m relay	China	Japan	Italy	

==== Sochi ====
Date	Place	Distance	Winner	Second	Third	Reference
2 February 2013	Iceberg Skating Palace	500m (1)	Wang Meng (CHN)	Arianna Fontana (ITA)	Liu Qiuhong (CHN)	
3 February 2013	Iceberg Skating Palace	500m (2)	Fan Kexin (CHN)	Arianna Fontana (ITA)	Gabrielle Williamson-Derraugh (CAN)	
3 February 2013	Iceberg Skating Palace	1000m	Park Seung-Hi (KOR)	Elise Christie (GBR)	Shim Suk Hee (KOR)	
2 February 2013	Iceberg Skating Palace	1500m	Shim Suk Hee (KOR)	Li Jianrou (CHN)	Elise Christie (GBR)	
3 February 2013	Iceberg Skating Palace	3000m relay	China	Canada	Italy	

==== Dresden ====
Date	Place	Distance	Winner	Second	Third	Reference
10 February 2013	EnergieVerbund Arena	500m	Wang Meng (CHN)	Marianne St-Gelais (CAN)	Liu Qiuhong (CHN)	
9 February 2013	EnergieVerbund Arena	1000m	Shim Suk Hee (KOR)	Lee Soyoun (KOR)	Park Seung-Hi (KOR)	
9 February 2013	EnergieVerbund Arena	1500m (1)	Elise Christie (GBR)	Kim Min-Jung (KOR)	Marie-Ève Drolet (CAN)	
10 February 2013	EnergieVerbund Arena	1500m (2)	Shim Suk Hee (KOR)	Kim Min-Jung (KOR)	Li Jianrou (CHN)	
10 February 2013	EnergieVerbund Arena	3000m relay	Netherlands	Canada	China	

== World Cup standings ==
* Note – Standings are calculated on the best 6 out of 8 results for the individual distances

=== Men's 500 metres ===
After 8 of 8 events

Pos	Athlete	Points
1.	Charles Hamelin (CAN)	4400
2.	Wu Dajing (CHN)	3650
3.	Liang Wenhao (CHN)	2731
4.	Vladimir Grigorev (RUS)	2653
5.	Robert Seifert (GER)	2056

=== Women's 500 metres ===
After 8 of 8 events

Pos	Athlete	Points
1.	Wang Meng (CHN)	6000
2.	Liu Qiuhong (CHN)	3730
3.	Fan Kexin (CHN)	3562
4.	Marianne St-Gelais (CAN)	3372
5.	Arianna Fontana (ITA)	2722

=== Men's 1000 metres ===
After 8 of 8 events

Pos	Athlete	Points
1.	Kwak Yoon-Gy (KOR)	4023
2.	Victor An (RUS)	3812
3.	Noh Jinkyu (KOR)	3456
4.	J. R. Celski (USA)	2592
5.	Liang Wenhao (CHN)	2528

=== Women's 1000 metres ===
After 8 of 8 events

Pos	Athlete	Points
1.	Elise Christie (GBR)	4552
2.	Shim Suk Hee (KOR)	3640
3.	Park Seung-Hi (KOR)	2640
4.	Lee Soyoun (KOR)	2475
5.	Liu Qiuhong (CHN)	2444

=== Men's 1500 metres ===
After 8 of 8 events

Pos	Athlete	Points
1.	Noh Jinkyu (KOR)	5800
2.	Victor An (RUS)	3336
3.	Sin Da-Woon (KOR)	2928
4.	Semen Elistratov (RUS)	2418
5.	Guillaume Bastille (CAN)	2072

=== Women's 1500 metres ===
After 8 of 8 events

Pos	Athlete	Points
1.	Shim Suk Hee (KOR)	6000
2.	Li Jianrou (CHN)	3548
3.	Kim Min-Jung (KOR)	3136
4.	Cho Ha-Ri (KOR)	2880
5.	Elise Christie (GBR)	2440

=== Men's 5000 metre relay ===
After 6 of 6 events

Pos	Athlete	Points
1.	South Korea	4000
2.	Netherlands	3200
3.	Russia	2952
4.	China	2592
5.	Canada	2100

=== Women's 3000 metre relay ===
After 6 of 6 events

Pos	Athlete	Points
1.	China	4000
2.	Canada	2992
3.	South Korea	2824
4.	Japan	2720
5.	Italy	2100

== Medal table ==
Rank	Nation	Gold	Silver	Bronze	Total
1	South Korea	29	14	14	57
2	China	15	13	12	40
3	Canada	6	15	12	33
4	Russia	5	4	6	15
5	Great Britain	2	4	2	8
6	Netherlands	1	4	3	8
7	United States	1	3	5	9
8	Germany	1	0	0	1
9	Italy	0	2	3	5
10	Japan	0	1	3	4
Totals (10 entries)		60	60	60	180

== See also ==
- 2013 World Short Track Speed Skating Championships
- 2013 European Short Track Speed Skating Championships
