= Fan Kexin =

Chinese speed skater (born 1993)

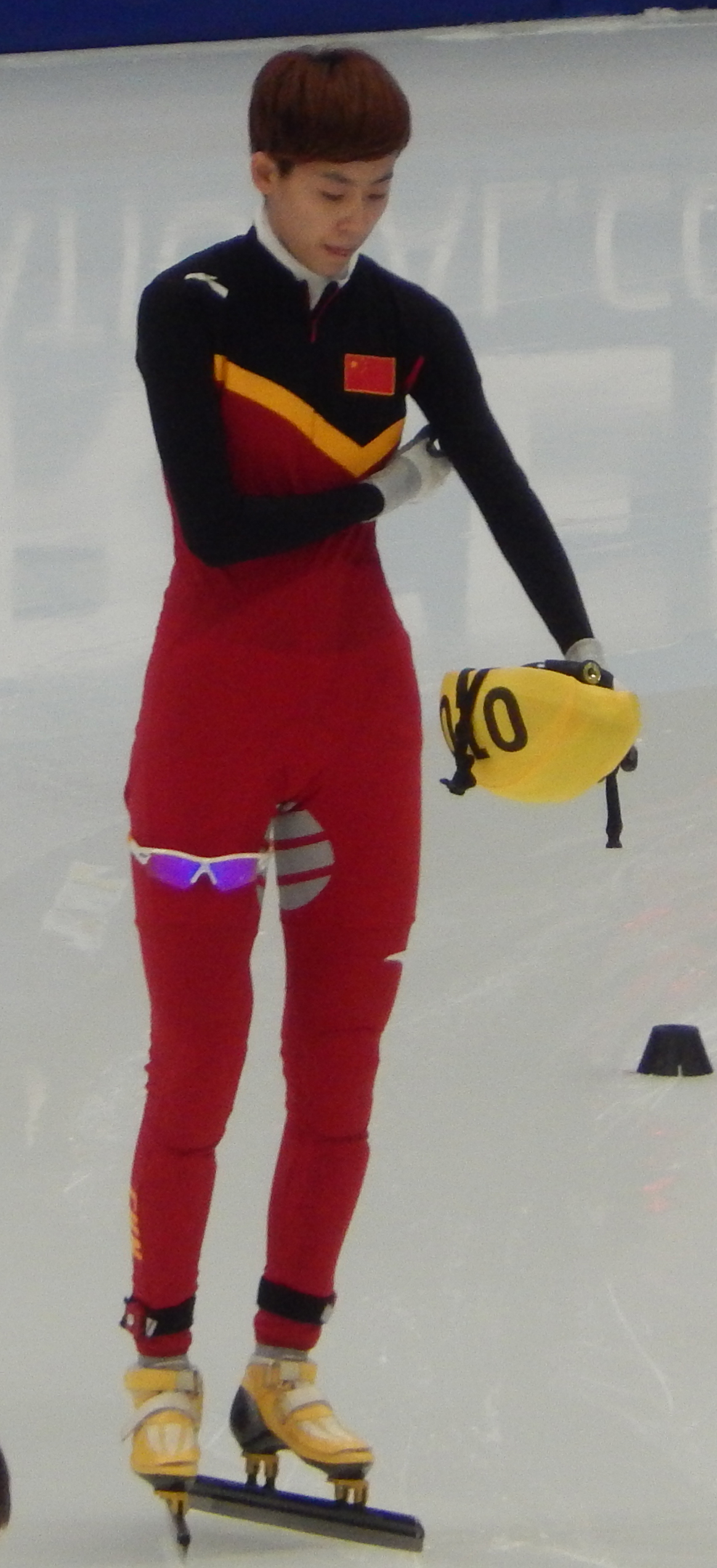
- Fan in 2015

Personal information
- Nationality: Chinese
- Born: 19 September 1993 (age 32) Qitaihe, Heilongjiang, China
- Height: 1.70 m (5 ft 7 in)
- Weight: 55 kg (121 lb)

Sport
- Country: China
- Sport: Short track speed skating
- Event(s): 500 m, 1000 m
- Club: Heilongjiang Province
- Coached by: Li Yan

Achievements and titles
- Personal best(s): 500m: 42.504 (2014); 1000m: 1:29.380 (2014); 1500m: 2:25.978 (2012); 3000m: 5:14.311 (2017)
Medal record
Women's short track speed skating
Representing China
Event	1st	2nd	3rd
Olympic Games	1	1	1
World Championships	11	2	2
World Team Championships	0	1	0
Asian Games	2	2	0
Total	14	6	3
Olympic Games
Gold medal – first place	2022 Beijing	2000 m mixed relay
Silver medal – second place	2014 Sochi	1000 m
Bronze medal – third place	2022 Beijing	3000 m relay
World Championships
Gold medal – first place	2011 Sheffield	500 m
Gold medal – first place	2011 Sheffield	3000 m relay
Gold medal – first place	2012 Shanghai	500 m
Gold medal – first place	2012 Shanghai	3000 m relay
Gold medal – first place	2013 Debrecen	3000 m relay
Gold medal – first place	2014 Montreal	3000 m relay
Gold medal – first place	2015 Moscow	500 m
Gold medal – first place	2016 Seoul	500 m
Gold medal – first place	2017 Rotterdam	500 m
Gold medal – first place	2017 Rotterdam	3000 m relay
Gold medal – first place	2024 Rotterdam	2000 m mixed relay
Silver medal – second place	2015 Moscow	3000 m relay
Silver medal – second place	2019 Sofia	500 m
Bronze medal – third place	2013 Debrecen	500 m
Bronze medal – third place	2014 Montreal	500 m
Asian Winter Games
Gold medal – first place	2011 Astana-Almaty	3000 m relay
Gold medal – first place	2025 Harbin	3000 m relay
Silver medal – second place	2011 Astana-Almaty	500 m
Silver medal – second place	2017 Sapporo	3000 m relay
World Team Championships
Silver medal – second place	2011 Warsaw	Team
World Junior Championships
Silver medal – second place	2010 Taipei	500 m
Silver medal – second place	2010 Taipei	3000 m relay

Fan Kexin (Chinese: 范可新; pinyin: Fàn Kěxīn; Mandarin pronunciation: [fân kʰɤ̀ ɕín]; born 19 September 1993) is a Chinese short-track speed-skater.

== Career ==
She has been on the Chinese national team since 2010. She won two silver medals in the 500 meters and 3000 meters relay at the 2010 ISU World Junior Championships. In 2011, she won her first gold medal at the World Championships on the 500 meters and another gold medal in the 3000 meters relay. She won a gold medal in the 3000 m relay event and a silver medal in the 500 m event in 2012.

In the 2014 Winter Olympics, she had been regarded as the favorite in 500 meters before the game since she was 2nd on that distance in the 2013–2014 season while the strongest Chinese skater Wang Meng was injured and couldn't participate. However, she fell in the second lap in the semifinals and ranked 5th at last. She won a silver medal eight days later in 1000 meters.

In the 2022 Winter Olympics, Fan won a gold medal in the 2000 m mixed relay but failed to advance in the 500m quarter-final. Controversy emerged after footage of her appearing to flick a lane marker in her opponent's path, causing her opponent to crash; it was unclear whether her action was deliberate.

== International competition podiums ==
Date	Competition	Location	Rank	Event	Result
9 January 2010	2010 World Junior Championships, Taipei	Taipei Arena	Silver medal	500 m	45.714
10 January 2010	2010 World Junior Championships, Taipei	Taipei Arena	Silver medal	3000 m relay	4:24.697
24 October 2010	2010–11 ISU World Cup, Montreal	Maurice Richard Arena	1st place, gold medalist(s)	3000 m relay	4:16.924
31 October 2010	2010–11 ISU World Cup, Quebec City	Pavillon de la Jeunesse	3rd place, bronze medalist(s)	500 m	44.224
31 October 2010	2010–11 ISU World Cup, Quebec City	Pavillon de la Jeunesse	1st place, gold medalist(s)	3000 m relay	4:13.008
4 December 2010	2010–11 ISU World Cup, Changchun	Changchun Wuhuan Gymnasium	3rd place, bronze medalist(s)	500 m	44.304
5 December 2010	2010–11 ISU World Cup, Changchun	Changchun Wuhuan Gymnasium	2nd place, silver medalist(s)	500 m	44.475
12 December 2010	2010–11 ISU World Cup, Shanghai	Songjiang University Students Sports Center	1st place, gold medalist(s)	3000 m relay	4:16.645
1 February 2011	2011 Asian Winter Games, Astana-Almaty	Republican Cycling Track	Silver medal	500 m	44.070
2 February 2011	2011 Asian Winter Games, Astana-Almaty	Republican Cycling Track	Gold medal	3000 m relay	4:18.836
13 February 2011	2010–11 ISU World Cup, Moscow	Megasport Arena	1st place, gold medalist(s)	3000 m relay	4:12.308
12 March 2011	2011 World Championships, Sheffield	Sheffield Arena	Gold medal	500 m	44.620
13 March 2011	2011 World Championships, Sheffield	Sheffield Arena	Gold medal	3000 m relay	4:16.295
20 March 2011	2011 World Team Championships, Warsaw	Torwar II	Silver medal	Team	34 points
23 October 2011	2011–12 ISU World Cup, Salt Lake City	Utah Olympic Oval	1st place, gold medalist(s)	3000 m relay	4:12.774
30 October 2011	2011–12 ISU World Cup, Saguenay	Centre Georges-Vézina	1st place, gold medalist(s)	3000 m relay	4:13.559
4 December 2011	2011–12 ISU World Cup, Nagoya	Nippon Gaishi Hall	3rd place, bronze medalist(s)	3000 m relay	4:16.251
10 December 2011	2011–12 ISU World Cup, Shanghai	Oriental Sports Center	1st place, gold medalist(s)	500 m	43.873
11 December 2011	2011–12 ISU World Cup, Shanghai	Oriental Sports Center	3rd place, bronze medalist(s)	500 m	44.130
11 December 2011	2011–12 ISU World Cup, Shanghai	Oriental Sports Center	1st place, gold medalist(s)	3000 m relay	4:12.394
5 February 2012	2011–12 ISU World Cup, Moscow	Megasport Arena	1st place, gold medalist(s)	500 m	43.899
5 February 2012	2011–12 ISU World Cup, Moscow	Megasport Arena	1st place, gold medalist(s)	3000 m relay	4:13.374
11 February 2012	2011–12 ISU World Cup, Dordrecht	Sportboulevard	3rd place, bronze medalist(s)	1500 m	2:33.012
12 February 2012	2011–12 ISU World Cup, Dordrecht	Sportboulevard	1st place, gold medalist(s)	3000 m relay	4:16.887
10 March 2012	2012 World Championships, Shanghai	Oriental Sports Center	Gold medal	500 m	43.887
11 March 2012	2012 World Championships, Shanghai	Oriental Sports Center	Gold medal	3000 m relay	4:13.855
21 October 2012	2012–13 ISU World Cup, Calgary	Olympic Oval	2nd place, silver medalist(s)	3000 m relay	4:07.530
28 October 2012	2012–13 ISU World Cup, Montreal	Maurice Richard Arena	1st place, gold medalist(s)	3000 m relay	4:14.305
2 December 2012	2012–13 ISU World Cup, Nagoya	Nippon Gaishi Hall	1st place, gold medalist(s)	3000 m relay	4:11.843
9 December 2012	2012–13 ISU World Cup, Shanghai	Oriental Sports Center	2nd place, silver medalist(s)	500 m	43.724
9 December 2012	2012–13 ISU World Cup, Shanghai	Oriental Sports Center	1st place, gold medalist(s)	3000 m relay	4:07.660
3 February 2013	2012–13 ISU World Cup, Sochi	Iceberg Skating Palace	1st place, gold medalist(s)	500 m	44.074
3 February 2013	2012–13 ISU World Cup, Sochi	Iceberg Skating Palace	1st place, gold medalist(s)	3000 m relay	4:10.425
10 February 2013	2012–13 ISU World Cup, Dresden	EnergieVerbund Arena	3rd place, bronze medalist(s)	3000 m relay	4:13.148
9 March 2013	2013 World Championships, Debrecen	Főnix Hall	Bronze medal	500 m	44.202
10 March 2013	2013 World Championships, Debrecen	Főnix Hall	Gold medal	3000 m relay	4:14.104
28 September 2013	2013–14 ISU World Cup, Shanghai	Oriental Sports Center	1st place, gold medalist(s)	500 m	43.279
29 September 2013	2013–14 ISU World Cup, Shanghai	Oriental Sports Center	2nd place, silver medalist(s)	3000 m relay	4:08.405
5 October 2013	2013–14 ISU World Cup, Seoul	Mokdong Ice Rink	2nd place, silver medalist(s)	500 m	43.130
6 October 2013	2013–14 ISU World Cup, Seoul	Mokdong Ice Rink	2nd place, silver medalist(s)	3000 m relay	4:08.128
9 November 2013	2013–14 ISU World Cup, Turin	PalaTazzoli	3rd place, bronze medalist(s)	500 m	43.783
10 November 2013	2013–14 ISU World Cup, Turin	PalaTazzoli	2nd place, silver medalist(s)	3000 m relay	4:11.404
16 November 2013	2013–14 ISU World Cup, Kolomna	Kolomna Speed Skating Center	2nd place, silver medalist(s)	500 m	43.203
17 November 2013	2013–14 ISU World Cup, Kolomna	Kolomna Speed Skating Center	1st place, gold medalist(s)	3000 m relay	4:06.785
21 February 2014	2014 Winter Olympics, Sochi	Iceberg Skating Palace	Silver medal	1000 m	1:29.380
15 March 2014	2014 World Championships, Montreal	Maurice Richard Arena	Bronze medal	500 m	42.942
16 March 2014	2014 World Championships, Montreal	Maurice Richard Arena	Gold medal	3000 m relay	4:08.811
8 November 2014	2014–15 ISU World Cup, Salt Lake City	Utah Olympic Oval	3rd place, bronze medalist(s)	1000 m	1:30.422
9 November 2014	2014–15 ISU World Cup, Salt Lake City	Utah Olympic Oval	1st place, gold medalist(s)	500 m	42.504 (WR)
9 November 2014	2014–15 ISU World Cup, Salt Lake City	Utah Olympic Oval	2nd place, silver medalist(s)	3000 m relay	4:06.952
15 November 2014	2014–15 ISU World Cup, Montreal	Maurice Richard Arena	1st place, gold medalist(s)	500 m	43.161
13 December 2014	2014–15 ISU World Cup, Shanghai	Oriental Sports Center	1st place, gold medalist(s)	500 m	43.272
14 December 2014	2014–15 ISU World Cup, Shanghai	Oriental Sports Center	2nd place, silver medalist(s)	3000 m relay	4:08.933
21 December 2014	2014–15 ISU World Cup, Seoul	Mokdong Ice Rink	1st place, gold medalist(s)	500 m	43.747
21 December 2014	2014–15 ISU World Cup, Seoul	Mokdong Ice Rink	1st place, gold medalist(s)	3000 m relay	4:16.782
7 February 2015	2014–15 ISU World Cup, Dresden	EnergieVerbund Arena	2nd place, silver medalist(s)	1000 m	1:30.451
8 February 2015	2014–15 ISU World Cup, Dresden	EnergieVerbund Arena	3rd place, bronze medalist(s)	500 m	43.763
15 February 2015	2014–15 ISU World Cup, Erzurum	Palandöken Ice Skating Hall	1st place, gold medalist(s)	500 m	43.009
15 February 2015	2014–15 ISU World Cup, Erzurum	Palandöken Ice Skating Hall	1st place, gold medalist(s)	3000 m relay	4:13.026
14 March 2015	2015 World Championships, Moscow	Ice Palace Krylatskoye	1st place, gold medalist(s)	500 m	43.866
15 March 2015	2015 World Championships, Moscow	Ice Palace Krylatskoye	2nd place, silver medalist(s)	3000 m relay	4:18.595
5 February 2022	2022 Winter Olympics, Beijing	Capital Indoor Stadium	Gold medal	2000 m mixed relay	2:37.348
