= Short-track speed skating at the 2011 Winter Universiade =

Short track speed skating at the 2011 Winter Universiade was held at the Atatürk University in Erzurum.

== Men's events ==
Event	Gold		Silver		Bronze	
500 metres	Thibaut Fauconnet; France	41.544	Liam McFarlane; Canada	41.874	Gao Ming; China	41.944
1000 metres	Kim Tae-hoon; South Korea	1:32.425	Sui Baoku; China	1:32.672	Kim Seoung-Il; South Korea	1:32.720
1500 metres	Kim Hwan-ee; South Korea	2:24.046	Kim Tae-hoon; South Korea	2:24.169	Kim Seoung-Il; South Korea	2:24.419
5000 metre relay	China (CHN); Liu Songbo; Sui Baoku; Xu Peng; Yang Fei; Gao Ming*	7:05.813	Canada (CAN); Gabriel Chaisson-Poirier; Vincent Cournoyer; Pier-Olivier Gagnon; Liam McFarlane; Allyn Gagnon*	7:06.359	France (FRA); Maxime Chataignier; Thibaut Fauconnet; Jeremy Masson; Vincent Jeanne; Thibaut Méline*	7:06.469

== Women's events ==
Event	Gold		Silver		Bronze	
500 metres	Xue Kong; China	45.054	Valérie Lambert; Canada	45.416	Lee Eun-byul; South Korea	59.793
1000 metres	Lee Eun-byul; South Korea	1:33.388	Kim Min-jung; South Korea	1:33.563	Marie Yoshida; Japan	1:33.734
1500 metres	Lee Eun-byul; South Korea	2:43.677	Jung Ba-ra; South Korea	2:43.985	Li Jianrou; China	2:44.078
3000 metre relay	South Korea (KOR); Jeon Ji-soo; Jung Ba-ra; Kim Min-jung; Lee Eun-byul; Shin Sae-bom*	4:18.097	China (CHN); Jin Jingzhu; Kong Xue; Li Jianrou; Liu Yang	4:19.136	Hungary (HUN); Bernadett Heidum; Erika Huszár; Andrea Keszler; Szandra Lajtos; Rózsa Darázs*	4:19.529

* Skaters who did not participate in the final, but received medals.

== Medals table ==
Rank	Nation	Gold	Silver	Bronze	Total
1	South Korea	5	3	3	11
2	China	2	2	2	6
3	France	1	0	1	2
4	Canada	0	3	0	3
5	Hungary	0	0	1	1
5	Japan	0	0	1	1
Totals (6 entries)		8	8	8	24
