= Short-track speed skating at the 2011 Asian Winter Games – Women's 3000 metre relay =

Women's 3000 metre relay at the 2011 Asian Winter Games
- Venue: Saryarka Velodrome
- Dates: 1–2 February 2011
- Competitors: 26 from 6 nations

Medalists
gold medal	China; Zhou Yang, Liu Qiuhong, Fan Kexin, Zhang Hui, Zhao Nannan
silver medal	South Korea; Park Seung-hi, Cho Ha-ri, Yang Shin-young, Hwang Hyun-sun, Kim Dam-min
bronze medal	Kazakhstan; Inna Simonova, Xeniya Motova, Darya Volokitina, Anna Samarina

The women's 3000 metre relay at the 2011 Asian Winter Games was held on February 1 and 2, 2011 in Astana, Kazakhstan.

== Schedule ==
All times are Almaty Time (UTC+06:00)

Date	Time	Event
Tuesday, 1 February 2011	14:48	Heats
Wednesday, 2 February 2011	15:04	Final

== Results ==
Legend

- PEN — Penalty

=== Heats ===
- Qualification: 1–2 → Final (Q)

==== Heat 1 ====
Rank	Team	Time	Notes
1	China (CHN); Zhou Yang; Zhao Nannan; Fan Kexin; Zhang Hui	4:18.836	Q
2	Kazakhstan (KAZ); Inna Simonova; Xeniya Motova; Darya Volokitina; Anna Samarina	4:39.411	Q
3	Chinese Taipei (TPE); Yang Szu-han; Lin Wei; Chung Hsiao-ying; Tsou Mu-yin	4:39.481	

==== Heat 2 ====
Rank	Team	Time	Notes
1	South Korea (KOR); Park Seung-hi; Kim Dam-min; Cho Ha-ri; Yang Shin-young	4:17.256	Q
2	Japan (JPN); Biba Sakurai; Yui Sakai; Ayuko Ito; Sayuri Shimizu	4:17.402	Q
3	North Korea (PRK); Hwang Hye-jong; Kim Jong-mi; Ri Won-hyang; Ju Yun-mi	4:28.710	

=== Final ===
Rank	Team	Time
1st place, gold medalist(s)	China (CHN); Zhou Yang; Liu Qiuhong; Fan Kexin; Zhang Hui	4:23.800
2nd place, silver medalist(s)	South Korea (KOR); Park Seung-hi; Cho Ha-ri; Yang Shin-young; Hwang Hyun-sun	4:30.010
3rd place, bronze medalist(s)	Kazakhstan (KAZ); Inna Simonova; Xeniya Motova; Darya Volokitina; Anna Samarina	4:32.011
—	Japan (JPN); Biba Sakurai; Yui Sakai; Ayuko Ito; Sayuri Shimizu	PEN
