= Li Jianrou =

Short track speed skater

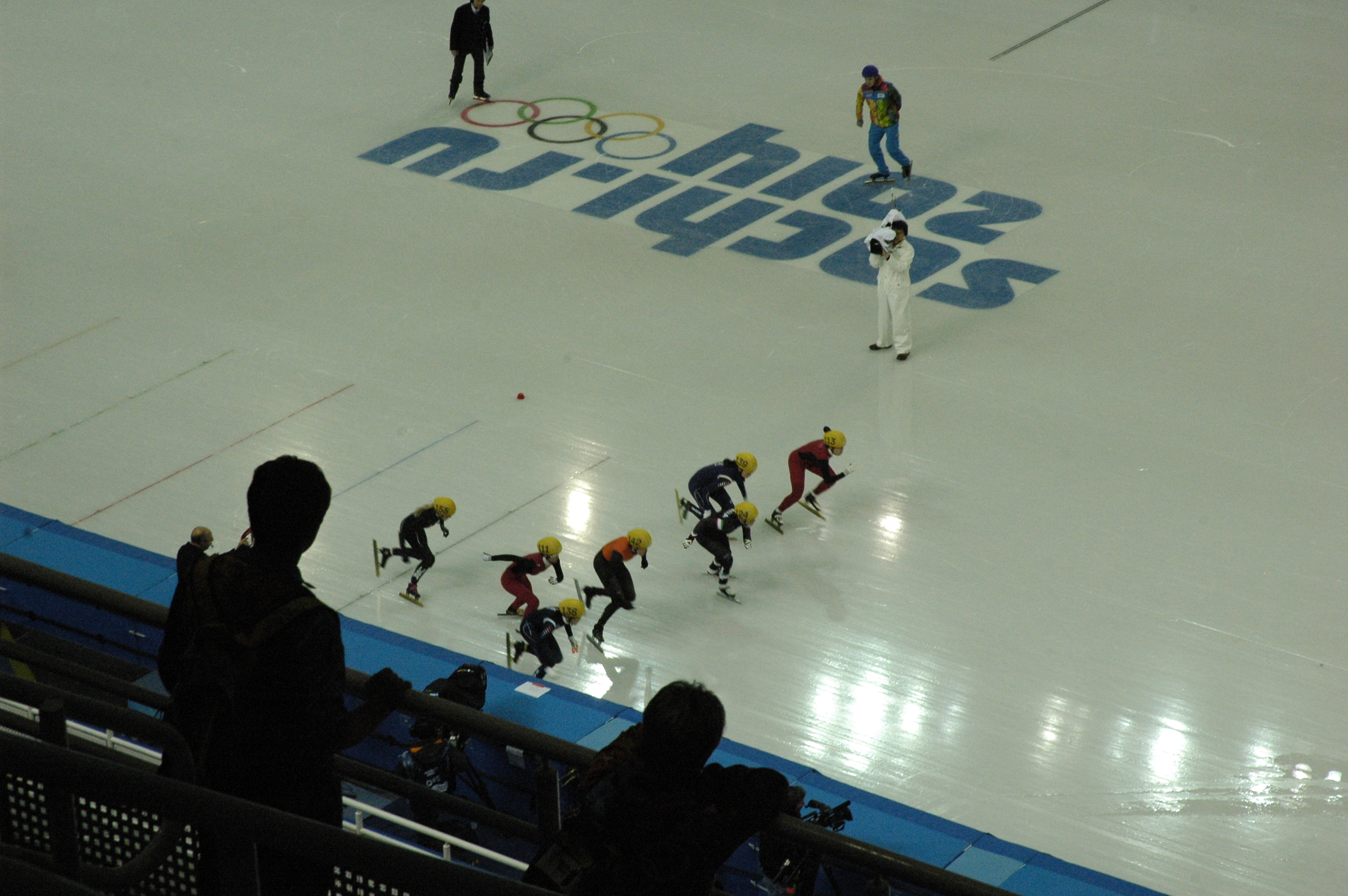
- Jianrou at the 2014 Winter Olympics

Personal information
- Born: August 15, 1986 (age 39) Jilin City, Jilin, China
- Height: 160 cm (5 ft 3 in)
- Weight: 55 kg (121 lb)

Sport
- Country: China
- Sport: Short track speed skating
- Coached by: Li Yan (National Team Coach)

Achievements and titles
- Personal best(s): 500m: 43.486 (2014); 1000m: 1:30.042 (2013); 1500m: 2:18.350 (2012); 3000m: 5:04.961 (2012)
Medal record
Women's short track speed skating
Representing China
Event	1st	2nd	3rd
Olympic Games	1	0	0
World Championships	5	1	0
World Team Championships	0	1	0
Olympic Games
Gold medal – first place	2014 Sochi	500 m
World Championships
Gold medal – first place	2011 Sheffield	3000 m relay
Gold medal – first place	2012 Shanghai	Overall
Gold medal – first place	2012 Shanghai	1500 m
Gold medal – first place	2012 Shanghai	3000 m relay
Gold medal – first place	2013 Debrecen	3000 m relay
Silver medal – second place	2012 Shanghai	1000 m
World Team Championships
Silver medal – second place	2011 Warsaw	Team
Winter Universiade
Silver medal – second place	2011 Erzurum	3000 m relay
Bronze medal – third place	2011 Erzurum	1500 m

Li Jianrou (Chinese: 李坚柔; pinyin: Lǐ Jiānróu; Mandarin pronunciation: [lì tɕjɛ́n ɻǒʊ]; born 15 August 1986 in Jilin City, Jilin Province) is a Chinese Short track Speed skater. She won a gold medal in the 500 m event of the 2014 Winter Olympics. She is the 2012 Overall World Champion. She represented China in the 2014 Winter Olympic's Ladies' 500 m event, 1000 m event and 1500 m event. She competed with China's women's relay team in the Ladies' 3000 m relay Finals and Semifinals.

== Career ==
Li took up the sport at the age of 10 in her hometown, Jilin, China. Educated at the Northeast Normal University in Changchun, she joined the national team in 2007 under the coaching of Li Yan. Li made her debut at the 2010 Speed Skating World Cup for China and in 2011, she was given the Sports Honour medal. In 2014, she finally achieved her ambition of participating in the Sochi Winter Olympics.

== International Competition podiums ==
Date	Competition	Location	Rank	Event	Result
28 Jan 2011	2011 Winter Universiade, Erzurum	(Turkey) GSIM Yenişehir Ice Hockey Hall		1500 m	2:30.434
30 Jan 2011	2011 Winter Universiade, Erzurum	(Turkey) GSIM Yenişehir Ice Hockey Hall		3000 m relay	4:19.136
12 Feb 2011	2010–11 ISU World Cup, Moscow	(Russia) Megasport Arena	3rd place, bronze medalist(s)	1000 m relay	1:32.024
13 Feb 2011	2010–11 ISU World Cup, Moscow	(Russia) Megasport Arena	1st place, gold medalist(s)	3000 m relay	4:12.308
13 Mar 2011	2011 World Championships, Sheffield	(United Kingdom) Sheffield Arena	Gold medal	3000 m relay	4:16.295
20 Mar 2011	2011 World Team Championships, Warsaw	(Poland) Torwar II	Silver medal	Team	34 points
23 Oct 2011	2011–12 ISU World Cup, Salt Lake City	(United States) Utah Olympic Oval	3rd place, bronze medalist(s)	1500 m	2:24.124
23 Oct 2011	2011–12 ISU World Cup, Salt Lake City	(United States) Utah Olympic Oval	1st place, gold medalist(s)	3000 m relay	4:12.774
30 Oct 2011	2011–12 ISU World Cup, Saguenay	(Canada) Centre Georges-Vézina	1st place, gold medalist(s)	3000 m relay	4:13.559
4 Dec 2011	2011–12 ISU World Cup, Nagoya	(Japan) Nippon Gaishi Hall	1st place, gold medalist(s)	1000 m	1:32.370
11 Dec 2011	2011–12 ISU World Cup, Shanghai	(China) Oriental Sports Center	2nd place, silver medalist(s)	1000 m	1:30.927
11 Dec 2011	2011–12 ISU World Cup, Shanghai	(China) Oriental Sports Center	1st place, gold medalist(s)	3000 m relay	4:12.394
5 Feb 2012	2011–12 ISU World Cup, Moscow	(Russia) Megasport Arena	1st place, gold medalist(s)	3000 m relay	4:13.374
12 Feb 2012	2011–12 ISU World Cup, Dordrecht	(Netherlands) Sportboulevard	3rd place, bronze medalist(s)	1000 m	1:32.819
12 Feb 2012	2011–12 ISU World Cup, Dordrecht	(Netherlands) Sportboulevard	1st place, gold medalist(s)	3000 m relay	4:16.887
9 Mar 2012	2012 World Championships, Shanghai	(China) Oriental Sports Center	Gold medal	1500 m	2:23.217
11 Mar 2012	2012 World Championships, Shanghai	(China) Oriental Sports Center	Silver medal	1000 m	1:31.325
11 Mar 2012	2012 World Championships, Shanghai	(China) Oriental Sports Center	Gold medal	Overall	60 points
11 Mar 2012	2012 World Championships, Shanghai	(China) Oriental Sports Center	Gold medal	3000 m relay	4:13.855
20 Oct 2012	2012–13 ISU World Cup, Calgary	(Canada) Olympic Oval	3rd place, bronze medalist(s)	1500 m	2:18.350
21 Oct 2012	2012–13 ISU World Cup, Calgary	(Canada) Olympic Oval	2nd place, silver medalist(s)	3000 m relay	4:07.530
27 Oct 2012	2012–13 ISU World Cup, Montreal	(Canada) Maurice Richard Arena	3rd place, bronze medalist(s)	1500 m	2:22.858
28 Oct 2012	2012–13 ISU World Cup, Montreal	(Canada) Maurice Richard Arena	1st place, gold medalist(s)	3000 m relay	4:14.305
2 Dec 2012	2012–13 ISU World Cup, Nagoya	(Japan) Nippon Gaishi Hall	1st place, gold medalist(s)	3000 m relay	4:11.843
8 Dec 2012	2012–13 ISU World Cup, Shanghai	(China) Oriental Sports Center	2nd place, silver medalist(s)	1500 m	2:19.465
9 Dec 2012	2012–13 ISU World Cup, Shanghai	(China) Oriental Sports Center	2nd place, silver medalist(s)	1000 m	1:30.610
9 Dec 2012	2012–13 ISU World Cup, Shanghai	(China) Oriental Sports Center	1st place, gold medalist(s)	3000 m relay	4:07.660
2 Feb 2013	2012–13 ISU World Cup, Sochi	(Russia) Iceberg Skating Palace	2nd place, silver medalist(s)	1500 m	2:21.702
3 Feb 2013	2012–13 ISU World Cup, Sochi	(Russia) Iceberg Skating Palace	1st place, gold medalist(s)	3000 m relay	4:10.425
10 Feb 2013	2012–13 ISU World Cup, Dresden	(Germany) EnergieVerbund Arena	3rd place, bronze medalist(s)	1500 m	2:25.055
10 Feb 2013	2012–13 ISU World Cup, Dresden	(Germany) EnergieVerbund Arena	3rd place, bronze medalist(s)	3000 m relay	4:13.148
10 Mar 2013	2013 World Championships, Debrecen	(Hungary) Főnix Hall	Gold medal	3000 m relay	4:14.104
29 Sep 2013	2013–14 ISU World Cup, Shanghai	(China) Oriental Sports Center	3rd place, bronze medalist(s)	1000 m	1:30.667
29 Sep 2013	2013–14 ISU World Cup, Shanghai	(China) Oriental Sports Center	2nd place, silver medalist(s)	3000 m relay	4:08.405
6 Oct 2013	2013–14 ISU World Cup, Seoul	(South Korea) Mokdong Ice Rink	2nd place, silver medalist(s)	3000 m relay	4:08.128
10 Nov 2013	2013–14 ISU World Cup, Turin	(Italy) PalaTazzoli	2nd place, silver medalist(s)	3000 m relay	4:11.404
17 Nov 2013	2013–14 ISU World Cup, Kolomna	(Russia) Kolomna Speed Skating Centre	1st place, gold medalist(s)	3000 m relay	4:06.785
13 Feb 2014	2014 Winter Olympics, Sochi	(Russia) Iceberg Skating Palace	Gold medal	500 m	43.486
