= Kim Hwan-ee =

South Korean speed skater

Kim Hwan-Ee
Personal information
- Born: June 6, 1990 (age 36) Daegu, South Korea
- Height: 166 cm (5 ft 5 in)
- Weight: 55 kg (121 lb)

Sport
- Country: South Korea
- Sport: Short track speed skating
Medal record
Men's short track speed skating
Representing South Korea
Winter Universiade
Gold medal – first place	2011 Erzurum	1500 m

Kim Hwan-Ee (Korean: 김환이, born June 6, 1990) is a South Korean short track speed skater.

At the 2011 Winter Universiade, Kim won the gold medal in the men's 1500 metre events.
