= Martina Valcepina =

Italian short track skater

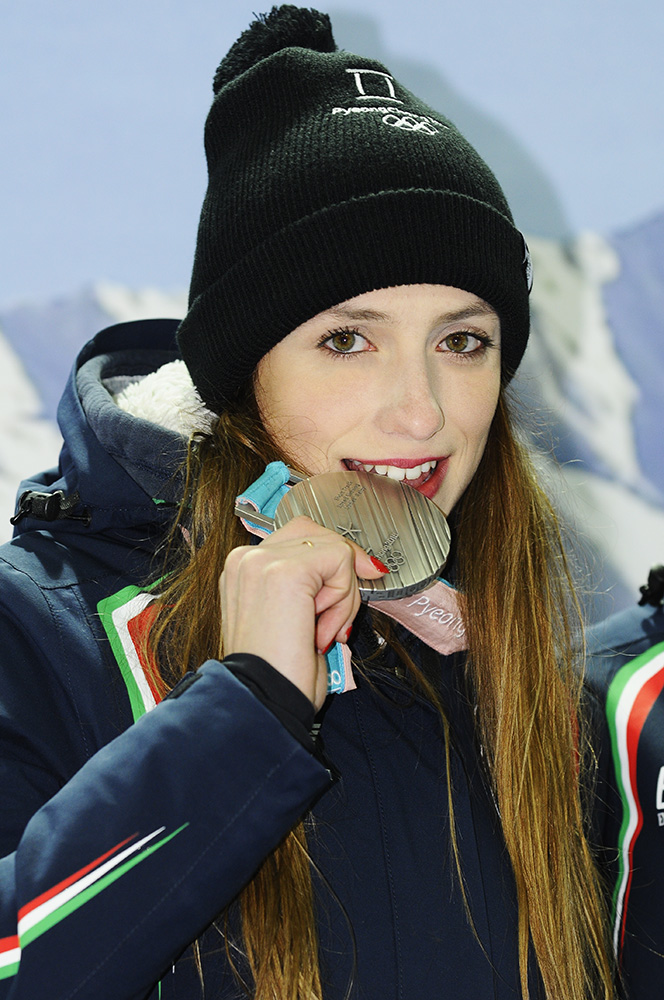
- Valcepina in 2018

Personal information
- Nationality: Italian
- Born: 4 June 1992 (age 34) Sondalo, Italy
- Height: 1.68 m (5 ft 6 in)
- Weight: 60 kg (132 lb)

Sport
- Country: Italy
- Sport: Short track speed skating
- Club: CS Fiamme Gialle

Achievements and titles
- World finals: 1
- Highest world ranking: 2 (500m)
Medal record
Women's short track speed skating
Representing Italy
Olympic Games
Silver medal – second place	2018 Pyeongchang	3000 m relay
Silver medal – second place	2022 Beijing	Mixed 2000 m relay
Bronze medal – third place	2014 Sochi	3000 m relay
World Championships
Bronze medal – third place	2021 Dordrecht	3000 m relay
World Team Championships
Bronze medal – third place	2010 Bormio	Team
European Championships
Gold medal – first place	2011 Heerenveen	500 m
Gold medal – first place	2017 Turin	3000 m relay
Gold medal – first place	2018 Dresden	500 m
Gold medal – first place	2018 Dresden	1500 m
Silver medal – second place	2012 Mladá Boleslav	3000 m relay
Silver medal – second place	2017 Turin	500 m
Silver medal – second place	2018 Dresden	Overall
Silver medal – second place	2019 Dordrecht	500 m
Silver medal – second place	2020 Debrecen	500 m
Silver medal – second place	2020 Debrecen	3000 m relay
Silver medal – second place	2026 Tilburg	3000 m relay
Bronze medal – third place	2011 Heerenveen	Overall
Bronze medal – third place	2011 Heerenveen	3000 m relay
Bronze medal – third place	2012 Mladá Boleslav	Overall
Bronze medal – third place	2020 Debrecen	Overall
Bronze medal – third place	2021 Gdańsk	3000 m relay
World Junior Championships
Bronze medal – third place	2011 Courmayeur	Overall

Martina Valcepina (born 4 June 1992) is an Italian short-track speed-skater. Her sister Arianna is also a short-track speed skater.

== Career ==
Valcepina competed at the 2010 Winter Olympics for Italy. She placed fourth in her round one race of the 500 metres, failing to advance, finishing 31st overall. She was also a member of the Italian 3000 metre relay team, which finished fourth in the semi-finals and third in the B Final, ending up sixth overall.

As of 2013, Valcepina's best performance at the World Championships came in 2012, finishing 4th in the 500 metres. She also won a bronze medal at the 2010 World Short Track Speed Skating Team Championships for Italy, and two gold medals at the World Junior Championships.

As of 2013, Valcepina has one ISU Short Track Speed Skating World Cup victory, as part of the Italian relay team in 2011–12 at Nagoya. She also has eighteen other podium finishes as a member of the relay team. She finished second in the World Cup rankings in the 500 metres in 2011–12.

== World Cup podiums ==
Date	Season	Location	Rank	Event
30 November 2008	2008–09	Beijing	3rd place, bronze medalist(s)	3000m Relay
8 February 2009	2008–09	Sofia	2nd place, silver medalist(s)	3000m Relay
15 February 2009	2008–09	Dresden	2nd place, silver medalist(s)	3000m Relay
12 December 2010	2010–11	Shanghai	3rd place, bronze medalist(s)	3000m Relay
13 February 2011	2010–11	Moscow	3rd place, bronze medalist(s)	500m
13 February 2011	2010–11	Moscow	3rd place, bronze medalist(s)	3000m Relay
19 February 2011	2010–11	Dresden	3rd place, bronze medalist(s)	500m
20 February 2011	2010–11	Dresden	2nd place, silver medalist(s)	500m
23 October 2011	2011–12	Salt Lake City	2nd place, silver medalist(s)	500m
29 October 2011	2011–12	Saguenay	2nd place, silver medalist(s)	500m
30 October 2011	2011–12	Saguenay	2nd place, silver medalist(s)	500m
4 December 2011	2011–12	Nagoya	3rd place, bronze medalist(s)	500m
4 December 2011	2011–12	Nagoya	1st place, gold medalist(s)	3000m Relay
12 February 2012	2011–12	Nagoya	3rd place, bronze medalist(s)	500m
9 December 2012	2012–13	Shanghai	3rd place, bronze medalist(s)	3000m Relay
3 February 2013	2012–13	Sochi	3rd place, bronze medalist(s)	3000m Relay
29 September 2013	2013–14	Shanghai	3rd place, bronze medalist(s)	3000m Relay
10 November 2013	2013–14	Turin	3rd place, bronze medalist(s)	3000m Relay
17 November 2013	2013–14	Kolomna	3rd place, bronze medalist(s)	3000m Relay
