= Kong Xue =

Short track speed skater

Personal information
- Born: August 26, 1991 (age 34)
- Height: 170 cm (5 ft 7 in)
- Weight: 59 kg (130 lb)

Sport
- Country: China
- Sport: Short track speed skating

Achievements and titles
- Personal best(s): 500m: 44.765 (2011); 1000m: 1:29.230 (2012); 1500m: 2:21.901 (2012)
Medal record
Women's short track speed skating
Representing China
World Championships
| Gold medal – first place | 2014 Montreal | 3000 m relay |
| Gold medal – first place | 2012 Shanghai | 3000 m relay |
World Junior Championships
| Silver medal – second place | 2007 Mladá Boleslav | 2000 m relay |
Winter Universiade
| Gold medal – first place | 2011 Erzurum | 500 m |
| Silver medal – second place | 2011 Erzurum | 3000 m relay |

Kong Xue (born August 26, 1991) is a Chinese short track speed skater. She won a gold medal in the 3000 m relay event in 2012.
