= Vincent Jeanne =

French short track speed skater (born 1991)

Personal information
- Born: 31 May 1991 (age 35) Harfleur
Medal record
Men's short track speed skating
Representing France
European Championships
Bronze medal – third place	2016 Sochi	Overall
Winter Universiade
Bronze medal – third place	2011 Erzurum	5000m relay

Vincent Jeanne (born 31 May 1991 in Harfleur) is a former male French short track speed skater. He was third in the overall competition at the 2016 European Championships in Sochi, though he did not finish in top-3 in any event at those championships. He was also bronze medalist in the relay competition at the 2011 Winter Universiade in Erzurum.

He participated only once at the World Championships. His best personal result was 27th in 1500 m event at the 2016 World Championships in Seoul. His best World Cup finish was 8th in the 1500 m at the World Cup stage in Erzurum during the 2014-15 season.

He was last active in the 2017/18 season. During his sporting career, he represented Club de Vitesse sur Glace du Havre from Le Havre.
