= Jung Ba-ra =

South Korean speed skater

Jung Ba-Ra
Personal information
- Born: June 13, 1989 (age 37)
Medal record
Women's short track speed skating
Representing South Korea
World Championships
Silver medal – second place	2009 Vienna	3000 m relay
World Team Championships
Silver medal – second place	2009 Heerenveen	Team
Winter Universiade
Gold medal – first place	2011 Erzurum	3000 m relay
Silver medal – second place	2011 Erzurum	1500 m
Silver medal – second place	2009 Harbin	3000 m relay
Bronze medal – third place	2009 Harbin	1000 m

Jung Ba-Ra (Korean: 정바라, born June 13, 1989) is a South Korean short track speed skater.
