= Kim Tae-hoon (speed skater) =

South Korean speed skater

Kim Tae-Hoon
Personal information
- Born: October 9, 1988 (age 37) Daegu, South Korea
- Height: 165 cm (5 ft 5 in)
- Weight: 58 kg (128 lb)

Sport
- Country: South Korea
- Sport: Short track speed skating
Medal record
Men's short track speed skating
Representing South Korea
Winter Universiade
Gold medal – first place	2011 Erzurum	1000 m
Silver medal – second place	2011 Erzurum	1500 m

Kim Tae-Hoon (Korean: 김태훈, born October 9, 1988, in Daegu) is a South Korean short track speed skater.

At the 2011 Winter Universiade, Kim won the gold medal in the men's 1000 metre events. He added silver in the 1500 metres.
