= Sayuri Shimizu =

Japanese speed skater (born 1989)

Personal information
- Born: January 14, 1989 (age 37) Hamamatsu, Japan
- Height: 5 ft 5 in (165 cm)
- Weight: 117 lb (53 kg)

Sport
- Country: Japan
- Sport: Short track speed skating

Achievements and titles
- Highest world ranking: 24 (500m)
Medal record
Women's short track speed skating
Representing Japan
World Championships
| Bronze medal – third place | 2011 Debrecen | 3000 m relay |

Sayuri Shimizu (清水 小百合, Shimizu Sayuri; born January 14, 1989 in Hamamatsu) is a Japanese short-track speed-skater.

Shimizu competed at the 2014 Winter Olympics for the Japan. In the 1000 metres she was fourth in her heat, failing to advance, and placing 25th overall. As a member of the Japanese 3000 metre relay team, she finished third in the heat, and then second in the B Final, ending up 5th overall.

As of September 2014, Shimizu's best performance at the World Championships came in 2013, when she won a bronze medal as a member of the Japanese 3000m relay team. Her best individual finish was 18th, in the 2013 500m.

As of September 2014, Shimizu has eight ISU Short Track Speed Skating World Cup podium finishes, as part of the relay team, with the best a pair of silver medals. Her top World Cup ranking is 12th, in the 500 metres in 2012–13.

== World Cup podiums ==
| Date | Season | Location | Rank | Event |
| 30 October 2011 | 2011–12 | Saguenay | 3rd place, bronze medalist(s) | 3000m Relay |
| 4 December 2011 | 2011–12 | Nagoya | 2nd place, silver medalist(s) | 3000m Relay |
| 11 December 2011 | 2011–12 | Shanghai | 3rd place, bronze medalist(s) | 3000m Relay |
| 10 February 2012 | 2011–12 | Dordrecht | 3rd place, bronze medalist(s) | 3000m Relay |
| 21 October 2012 | 2012–13 | Calgary | 3rd place, bronze medalist(s) | 3000m Relay |
| 27 October 2012 | 2012–13 | Montreal | 3rd place, bronze medalist(s) | 3000m Relay |
| 2 December 2012 | 2012–13 | Nagoya | 3rd place, bronze medalist(s) | 3000m Relay |
| 7 December 2012 | 2012–13 | Shanghai | 2nd place, silver medalist(s) | 3000m Relay |
