= Lee Eun-byul =

Short track speed skater

Lee Eun-Byul
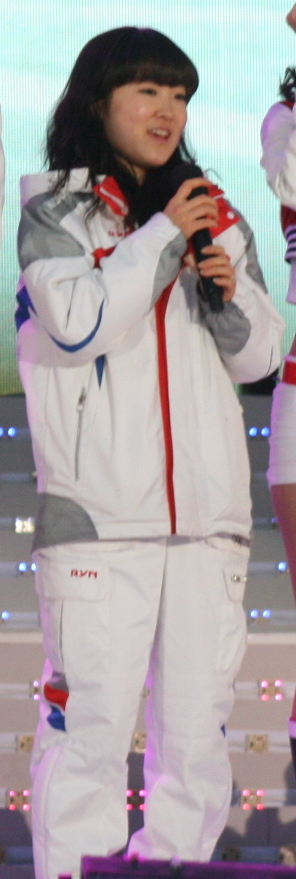

Personal information
- Born: October 2, 1991 (age 35)
- Height: 152 cm (5 ft 0 in)
- Weight: 46 kg (101 lb)

Sport
- Country: South Korea
- Sport: Short track speed skating
Medal record
Olympic Games
Silver medal – second place	2010 Vancouver	1500 m
World Championships
Gold medal – first place	2010 Sofia	3000 m relay
Gold medal – first place	2016 Seoul	3000 m relay
Silver medal – second place	2010 Sofia	1500 m
Bronze medal – third place	2010 Sofia	3000 m
Bronze medal – third place	2012 Shanghai	3000 m relay
World Team Championships
Gold medal – first place	2010 Bormio	Team
Winter Universiade
Gold medal – first place	2011 Erzurum	1000 m
Gold medal – first place	2011 Erzurum	1500 m
Gold medal – first place	2011 Erzurum	3000 m relay
Gold medal – first place	2013 Trentino	3000 m relay
Silver medal – second place	2013 Trentino	1000 m
Silver medal – second place	2015 Granada	1000 m
Silver medal – second place	2015 Granada	1500 m
Silver medal – second place	2015 Granada	3000 m relay
Bronze medal – third place	2011 Erzurum	500 m
World Junior Championships
Silver medal – second place	2008 Bolzano	Overall
Silver medal – second place	2009 Sherbrooke	Overall

- Lee Eun-byul
- Hangul: 이은별
- Hanja: 李은별
- RR: I Eunbyeol
- MR: I Ŭnbyŏl

Lee Eun-Byul (Korean: 이은별, Korean pronunciation: [i.ɯn.bjʌl]; born October 2, 1991) is a South Korean short track speed skater. She won the silver medal at the 2008 World Junior Championships in Bolzano. She also finished in second place in the 1500m speed skating at the 2010 Winter Olympics in Vancouver, British Columbia, Canada.

== Career highlights ==
Winter Olympic Games - Short Track Speed Skating
2010 - Vancouver, (silver) 2nd place
ISU World Junior Short Track Speed Skating Championships
2008 - Bolzano, (silver) 2nd overall classification
