= 2013 World Short Track Speed Skating Championships =

International speed skating competition

- Venue: Főnix Hall; Debrecen, Hungary
- Dates: 8–10 March
- Competitors: 168 from 32 nations

The 2013 World Short Track Speed Skating Championships took place from 8 to 10 March 2013 at the Főnix Hall in Debrecen, Hungary. They were the 38th World Short Track Speed Skating Championships and the first to be held in Hungary.

== Schedule ==
The preliminary schedule of the event is the following:

Date	Time	Program
7 March	All day	Official training
7 March	19:00	Official draw
8 March	TBA	Opening ceremony
8 March	12:30	1500 m ladies/men
8 March	Followed by	Awards ceremony
8 March	15:20	3000 m relay ladies semifinals
9 March	12:30	500 m ladies/men
9 March	Followed by	Awards ceremony
9 March	16:35	5000 m relay men semifinals
10 March	11:00	1000 m ladies/men
10 March	Followed by	Awards ceremony
10 March	14:57	3000 m Super finals ladies/men
10 March	15:33	3000 m relay ladies final
10 March	15:43	5000 m relay men final
10 March	Followed by	Awards ceremony

== Results ==
* First place is awarded 34 points, second is awarded 21 points, third is awarded 13 points, fourth is awarded 8 points, fifth is awarded 5 points, sixth is awarded 3 points, seventh is awarded 2 points, and eighth is awarded 1 point in each race, to determine to the overall world champion. Points are only awarded to the athletes that have taken part in the final of each race. The leader after the first 1000 m in the 3000 m super-final is awarded extra 5 points. Relays do not count for the overall classification.

=== Men ===
Event	Gold		Silver		Bronze	
Overall*	Sin Da-woon; South Korea	89 pts	Kim Yun-jae; South Korea	55 pts	Charles Hamelin; Canada	39 pts
500 m	Liang Wenhao; China	41.090	Victor Ahn; Russia	41.283	Freek van der Wart; Netherlands	41.504
1000 m	Sin Da-woon; South Korea	1:26.035	Sjinkie Knegt; Netherlands	1:25.798	Charles Hamelin; Canada	1:25.546
1500 m	Sin Da-woon; South Korea	2:27.062	Kim Yun-jae; South Korea	2:27.101	Charles Hamelin; Canada	2:27.209
5000 m relay	Canada; Olivier Jean; Charle Cournoyer; Michael Gilday; Charles Hamelin	6:51.379	Russia; Victor Ahn; Vyacheslav Kurginyan; Semen Elistratov; Vladimir Grigorev	6:51.953	Netherlands; Daan Breeuwsma; Niels Kerstholt; Sjinkie Knegt; Freek van der Wart	6:52.187

=== Women ===
Event	Gold		Silver		Bronze	
Overall*	Wang Meng; China	68 pts	Park Seung-hi; South Korea	58 pts	Shim Suk-hee; South Korea	55 pts
500 m	Wang Meng; China	43.177	Park Seung-hi; South Korea	43.850	Fan Kexin; China	44.202
1000 m	Wang Meng; China	1:31.460	Jorien ter Mors; Netherlands	1:31.609	Elise Christie; Great Britain	1:31.593
1500 m	Park Seung-hi; South Korea	2:23.634	Shim Suk-hee; South Korea	2:23.755	Marianne St-Gelais; Canada	2:24.694
3000 m relay	China; Wang Meng; Fan Kexin; Zhou Yang; Liu Qiuhong; Li Jianrou	4:14.104	Canada; Marianne St-Gelais; Valérie Maltais; Jessica Hewitt; Marie-Ève Drolet	4:15.106	Japan; Biba Sakurai; Ayuko Ito; Sayuri Shimizu; Yui Sakai	4:15.680

== Medal table ==
Rank	Nation	Gold	Silver	Bronze	Total
1	China (CHN)	5	0	1	6
2	South Korea (KOR)	4	5	1	10
3	Canada (CAN)	1	1	4	6
4	Netherlands (NED)	0	2	2	4
5	Russia (RUS)	0	2	0	2
6	Great Britain (GBR)	0	0	1	1
6	Japan (JPN)	0	0	1	1
Totals (7 entries)		10	10	10	30
