= Szandra Lajtos =

Hungarian short track speed skater

Personal information
- Full name: Szandra Lajtos
- Nationality: Hungarian
- Born: 22 July 1986 (age 40) Szeged, Hungary

Sport
- Sport: Short track speed skating
- Club: Szegedi Korcsolyázó Egyesület
Medal record
Representing Hungary
Winter Universiade
Bronze medal – third place	2011 Erzurum	3000 m relay
European Championship
Silver medal – second place	2011 Heerenveen	3000 m relay
Bronze medal – third place	2006 Krynica-Zdrój	3000 m relay
Bronze medal – third place	2012 Mladá Boleslav	3000 m relay
Bronze medal – third place	2015 Dordrecht	3000 m relay

Szandra Lajtos (pronounced [ˈsɒndrɒ ˈlɒjtoʃ]; born 22 July 1986 in Szeged) is a Hungarian short track speed skater.

Her first major championship was the 2002 Winter Olympic Games in Salt Lake City, where she participated at the age of 15, being the youngest member of the Hungarian delegation, and also the youngest competitor in short track speed skating. Lajtos ran in two distances, finishing 28th in 500 metres and 19th in the 1,000 metres event.

Among her best results are a silver medal in the 3000 metres relay from the 2011 European Championship and two bronze medals in the same event from 2006 and 2012.

Lajtos was also member of the Hungarian relay team at the 2011 Winter Universiade, where they came third behind South Korea and China.

== Personal records ==
As of 8 March 2012

Distance	Time	Date set	Place	Event
500 meters	45.090	29 October 2011	Saguenay, Canada	Korean Air World Cup
1000 meters	1:32.432	19 February 2011	Dresden, Germany	ISU World Cup
1500 meters	2:25.712	15 December 2006	Spišská Nová Ves, Slovakia	Danubia Series – Slovak Open
3000 meters	5:12.563	14 November 2010	Bormio, Italy	Alta Valtellina Trophy
