= Zhang Hui (speed skater) =

Chinese speed skater

Medal record

Women's short track speed skating

Representing China

Olympic Games
Gold medal – first place	2010 Vancouver	3000 m relay

World Championships
Gold medal – first place	2011 Sheffield	3000 m Relay

Asian Games
Gold medal – first place	2011 Astana-Almaty	3000 m relay

Zhang Hui (simplified Chinese: 张会; traditional Chinese: 張會; pinyin: Zhāng Huì; born 8 March 1988 in Harbin, Heilongjiang) is a short track speed skater who competes for China. As part of the 3000m relay team, Zhang won the gold medal. She was accidentally injured in the face by making contact with the blade of her teammate Wang Meng during the celebration.
