= Kim Yun-jae =

South Korean speed skater

Medal record

Men's short track speed skating

Representing South Korea

World Championships
Gold medal – first place	2013 Debrecen	3000m
Silver medal – second place	2013 Debrecen	1500m
Silver medal – second place	2013 Debrecen	Overall
Silver medal – second place	2014 Montreal	5000m relay

World Junior Championships
Gold medal – first place	2008 Bolzano	Overall
Gold medal – first place	2008 Bolzano	1000m
Gold medal – first place	2008 Bolzano	1500m
Gold medal – first place	2008 Bolzano	2000m relay
Silver medal – second place	2008 Bolzano	3000m

Kim Yun-jae (Korean: 김윤재; born May 14, 1990) is a South Korean short track speed skater. He won three distances and the overall classification at the 2008 World Junior Championships in Bolzano.
