= 2012 World Short Track Speed Skating Championships =

Skating championships

World Short Track Speed Skating Championships
- Venue: Shanghai Oriental Sports Center
- Dates: 9–11 March

The 2012 World Short Track Speed Skating Championships took place between March 9 and 11, 2012 at the Shanghai Oriental Sports Center in Shanghai, China. The World Championships are organised by the ISU which also runs world cups and championships in speed skating and figure skating.

== Schedule ==
Date	Time	Program
9 March	13:00	1500 m women
9 March	13:00	1500 m men
9 March	13:00	3000 m women semifinal
10 March	13:00	500 m women
10 March	13:00	500 m men
10 March	13:00	3000 m men semifinal
11 March	13:00	1000 m women
11 March	13:00	1000 m men
11 March	13:00	3000 m women
11 March	13:00	3000 m men
11 March	13:00	3000 m relay women
11 March	13:00	5000 m relay men

== Results ==
* First place is awarded 34 points, second is awarded 21 points, third is awarded 13 points, fourth is awarded 8 points, fifth is awarded 5 points, sixth is awarded 3 points, seventh is awarded 2 points, and eighth is awarded 1 point in each race, to determine to Overall World Champion. Points are only awarded to the athletes that have taken part in the Final of each race. The leader after the first 1000m in the 3000m Super-Final is awarded extra 5 points. Relays do not count for the Overall Classification.

=== Men ===
Event	Gold		Silver		Bronze	
Overall*	Kwak Yoon-gy; South Korea	102 points	Noh Jin-kyu; South Korea	76 points	Olivier Jean; Canada	52 points
500 m	Olivier Jean; Canada	41.077	Charles Hamelin; Canada	41.186	Kwak Yoon-gy; South Korea	41.479
1000 m	Kwak Yoon-gy; South Korea	1:27.772	Noh Jin-kyu; South Korea	1:34.463	Charles Hamelin; Canada	1:55.181
1500 m	Noh Jin-kyu; South Korea	2:15.661	Kwak Yoon-gy; South Korea	2:15.755	Sin Da-woon; South Korea	2:15.861
5000 m relay	Canada; Guillaume Bastille; François-Louis Tremblay; Olivier Jean; Liam McFarlane; Charles Hamelin*	6:42.570	Netherlands; Niels Kerstholt; Daan Breeuwsma; Freek van der Wart; Sjinkie Knegt	6:42.626	South Korea; Kwak Yoon-gy; Lee Ho-suk; Noh Jin-kyu; Sin Da-woon; Lee Jung-su*	6:42.629

* Skaters who did not participate in the final, but received medals.

=== Ladies ===
Event	Gold		Silver		Bronze	
Overall*	Li Jianrou; China	60 points	Valérie Maltais; Canada	47 points	Arianna Fontana; Italy	44 points
500 m	Fan Kexin; China	44.438	Arianna Fontana; Italy	44.467	Lana Gehring; United States	44.815
1000 m	Cho Ha-ri; South Korea	1:31.283	Li Jianrou; China	1:31.325	Valérie Maltais; Canada	1:31.350
1500 m	Li Jianrou; China	2:23.217	Liu Qiuhong; China	2:23.411	Marie-Ève Drolet; Canada	2:23.474
3000 m relay	China; Liu Qiuhong; Kong Xue; Fan Kexin; Li Jianrou; Xiao Han*	4:16.303	United States; Lana Gehring; Jessica Smith; Emily Scott; Tamara Frederick	4:17.223	South Korea; Cho Ha-ri; Choi Jung-won; Son Soo-min; Lee Eun-byul; Kim Dam-min*	4:17.240

* Skaters who did not participate in the final, but received medals.

== Medal table ==
* Host nation (China)

Rank	Nation	Gold	Silver	Bronze	Total
1	South Korea (KOR)	4	3	4	11
2	China (CHN)*	4	2	0	6
3	Canada (CAN)	2	2	4	8
4	Italy (ITA)	0	1	1	2
4	United States (USA)	0	1	1	2
6	Netherlands (NED)	0	1	0	1
Totals (6 entries)		10	10	10	30
