= Lana Gehring =

American short track speed skater

Personal information
- Born: August 21, 1990 (age 35) Chicago, Illinois, U.S.
- Height: 5 ft 9 in (175 cm)
- Weight: 137 lb (62 kg)

Sport
- Country: United States
- Sport: Short track speed skating
- Club: U.S. National Racing Program
Medal record
Women's short track speed skating
Representing the United States
Olympic Games
| Bronze medal – third place | 2010 Vancouver | 3000 m relay |
World Championships
| Silver medal – second place | 2012 Shanghai | 3000 m relay |
| Bronze medal – third place | 2010 Sofia | 3000 m relay |
| Bronze medal – third place | 2012 Shanghai | 500 m |
World Team Championships
| Bronze medal – third place | 2009 Heerenveen | Team |
| Bronze medal – third place | 2011 Warsaw | Team |

Lana Gehring (born August 21, 1990 in Chicago, Illinois) is an American short track speed skater. She competed for the United States at the 2010 Winter Olympics, winning a bronze medal as part of a relay team. She has qualified for a spot on the U.S. team for the 2018 Winter Olympics.

== Career ==
At the 2010 Winter Olympics, in Vancouver, Gehring won a bronze medal as part of the 3000 m relay team. After failing to make the U.S. short track team for the 2014 Winter Olympics in Sochi, Gerhing retired from speed skating. She then began skating long track before returning to short track. In December 2017 she qualified for the U.S. short track team for the 2018 Winter Olympics.
