= Sin Da-woon =

South Korean speed skater

Chae Ji-hoon
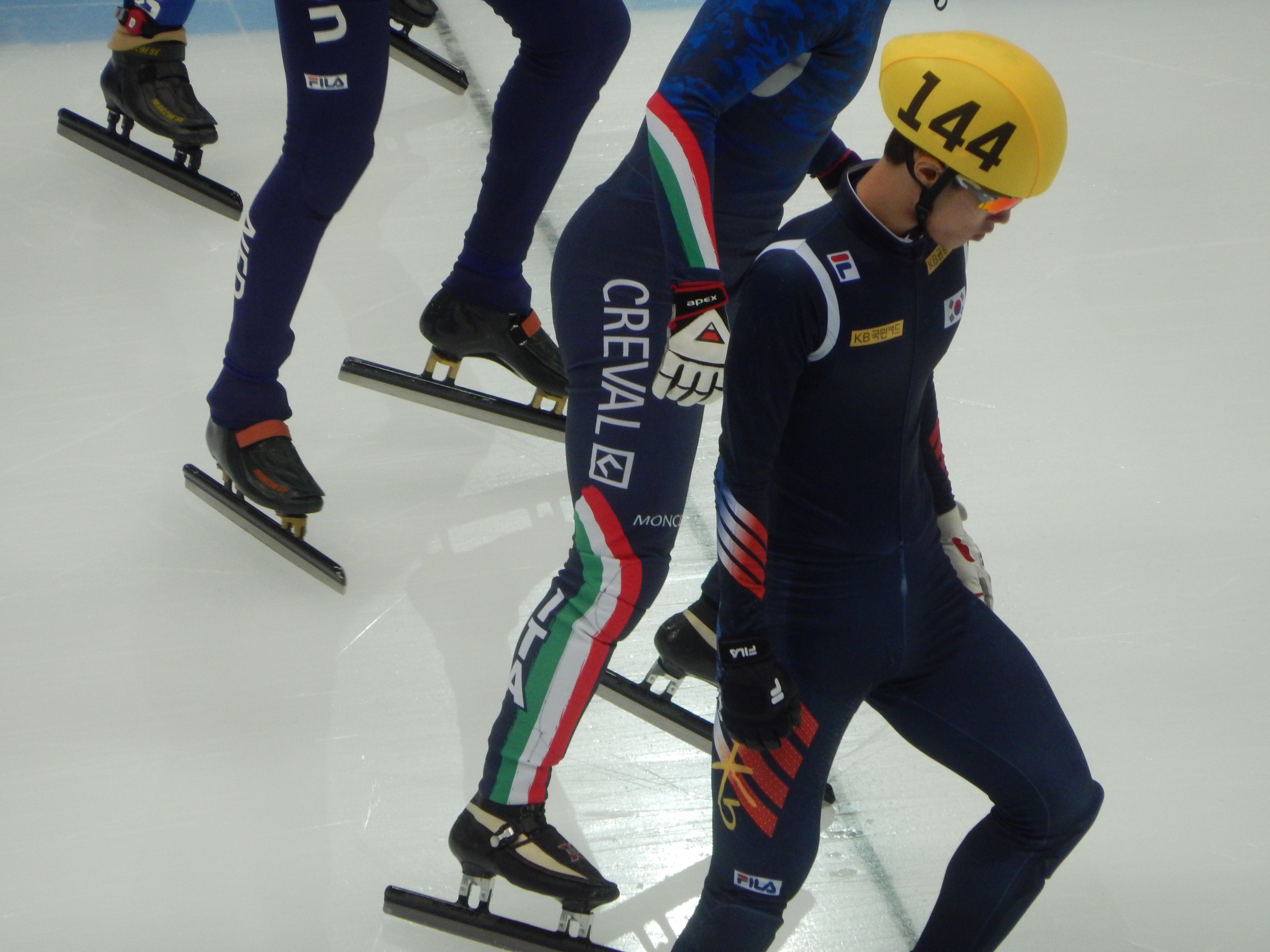

Personal information
- Born: 5 March 1993 (age 33)

Sport
- Country: South Korea
- Sport: Short track speed skating
Medal record
Men's short track speed skating
Representing South Korea
World Championships
Gold medal – first place	2013 Debrecen	Overall
Gold medal – first place	2013 Debrecen	1000 m
Gold medal – first place	2013 Debrecen	1500 m
Gold medal – first place	2017 Rotterdam	1500 m
Silver medal – second place	2013 Debrecen	3000 m
Silver medal – second place	2014 Montreal	5000 m relay
Bronze medal – third place	2012 Shanghai	1500 m
Bronze medal – third place	2012 Shanghai	3000 m
Bronze medal – third place	2012 Shanghai	5000 m relay
Asian Winter Games
Silver medal – second place	2017 Sapporo	1000 m
Silver medal – second place	2017 Sapporo	5000 m relay

Sin Da-Woon (Korean: 신다운, born 5 March 1993) is a South Korean short track speed skater. He won two distances and the overall classification at the 2013 World Short Track Speed Skating Championships.

Sin served a one year ban from April 2018 to April 2019 in a relation to an anti-doping rule violation for three whereabouts failures in a twelve month period.
