= Sportboulevard Dordrecht =

Sports complex in the Netherlands

- Interactive map of Sportboulevard Dordrecht
- Address: Fanny Blankers-Koenweg 10; Dordrecht; Netherlands
- Coordinates: 51°47′36″N 4°40′47″E
- Operator: Optisport Exploitaties B.V.

Construction
- Built: 2004-2010
- Opened: 2010

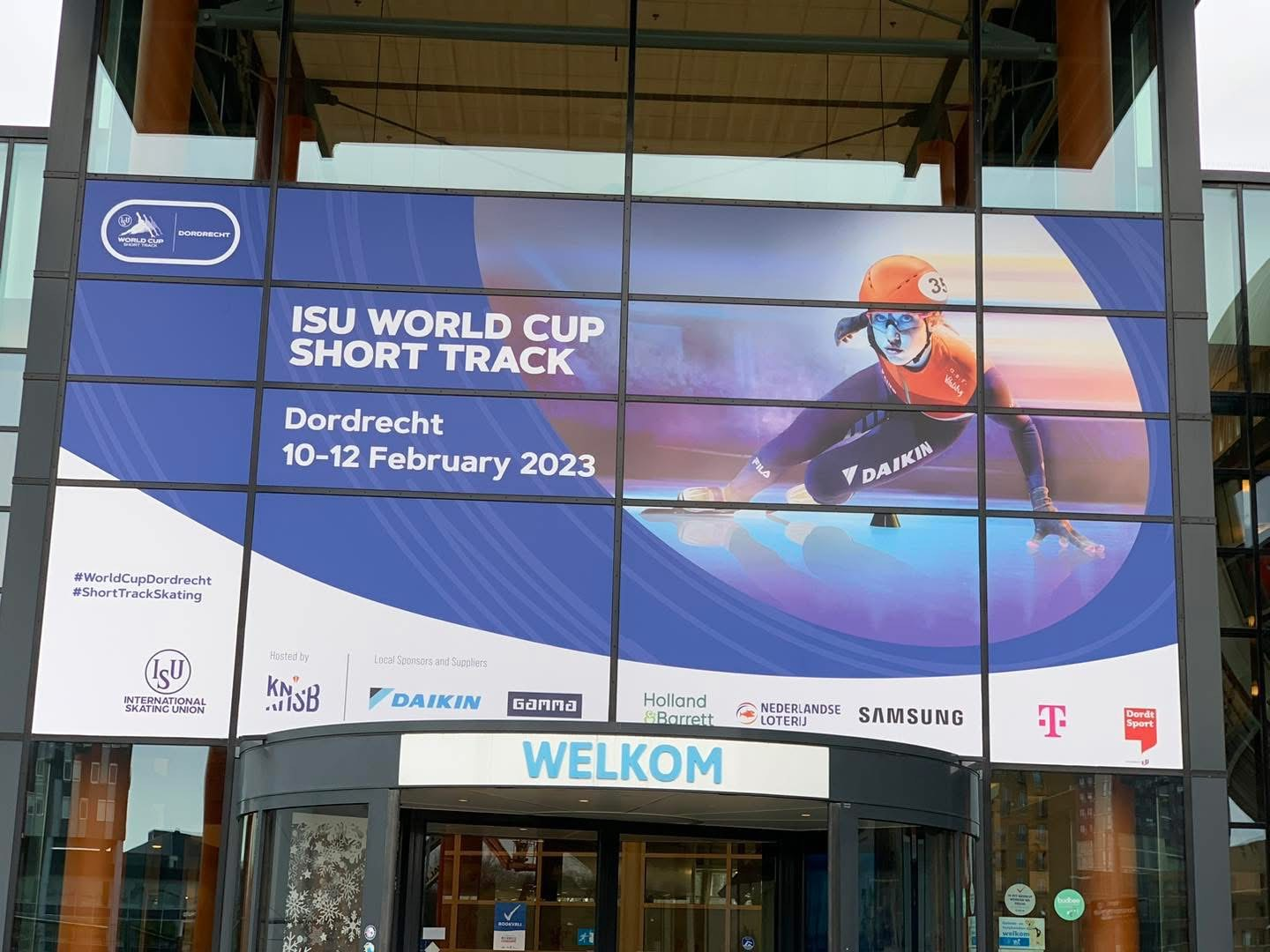
Entrance to Sports Boulevard Dordrecht, 2023

Sportboulevard Dordrecht is a sports complex in Dordrecht, the Netherlands. The facility is owned by the municipality and operated by Optisport, a Dutch management firm. The complex consists of an Olympic-size swimming pool, an ice rink, a gym and an arena for basketball, volleyball and gymnastics. The venue has hosted international championships in short-track speed skating.

== History ==
The idea to build Sportboulevard dates from the late 1990´s, when the expansion of the Albert Schweitzer Hospital required the removal of outdoor swimming pool Aquapulca and an adjacent indoor tennis facility. In 2004, the municipality approved a 52 million Euro project to build the sports complex that, together with the hospital, formed the so-called Health Park. The project was developed by Hooper Architects. The facility replaced the Aquapulca outdoor pool, the Sterrenburg sports arena and the Drechtstedenhal, an indoor ice rink. The complex opened in May 2010 and covered 35,750 m^{2} (384,810 sq ft).

Maintenance costs of over 500.000 euro per year and repairs of 1.6 million euros were financed by Dordrecht municipality. Still, when energy costs soared in the early 2020´s, the municipality was forced to provide additional financing. In 2023, 3.189 solar panels were installed to improve energy sustainability. The project received a mention in the Future of Energy Awards.

== Sports ==
=== Basketball ===
Sportboulevard Dordrecht is home of DBV Rowic. Short-lived professional basketball team Dutch Windmills also played their home games at Sportboulevard.

=== Ice hockey ===
Sportboulevard Dordrecht is home of Dordrecht Lions.

== Events ==
=== Short track speed skating ===
Sportboulevard Dordrecht has hosted the following international short track speed skating events.

- World Championships
  - 2021
- World Cup
  - 2011-12, 2015-16, 2017-18, 2019-20, 2021-22, 2022-23
- World Tour
  - 2025-26
- European Championships
  - 2015, 2019

==== Korfball ====
The 2016 European Korfball Championships were held at Sportboulevard Dordrecht.

=== Underwater hockey ===
The first Underwater Hockey Intercontinental Championships for the Europe-Africa region were held in 2025 at Sportboulevard.
