= Liam McFarlane =

Canadian speed skater (born 1985)

Personal information
- Born: December 30, 1985 (age 40) Medicine Hat, Alberta, Canada
- Height: 173 cm (5 ft 8 in)
- Weight: 80.74 kg (178 lb)

Sport
- Country: Canada
- Sport: Short track speed skating
Medal record
Men's short track speed skating
Representing Canada
World Championships
Gold medal – first place	2012 Shanghai	5,000 m relay

Liam McFarlane (born December 30, 1985, in Medicine Hat, Alberta) is a Canadian short track speed skater. McFarlane was a part of the relay team that won gold for Canada at the 2012 World Short Track Speed Skating Championships.
