= Shanghai Oriental Sports Center =

Sports venue in Shanghai, China

Shanghai SPD Bank Oriental Sports Center
- Shanghai Aquatic Sports Center

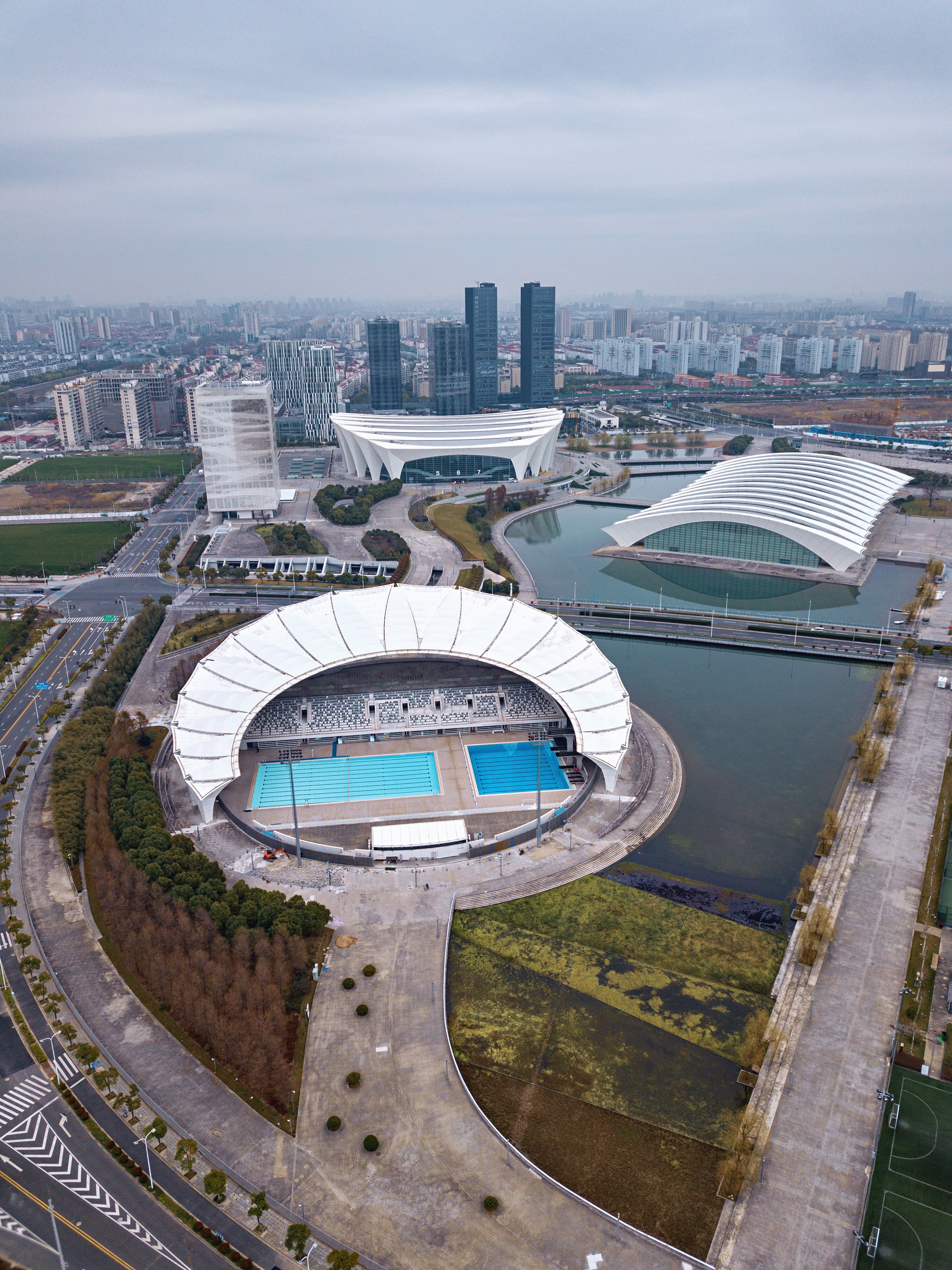
- Interactive map of Shanghai SPD Bank Oriental Sports Center
- Address: Shanghai, China
- Coordinates: 31°9′34.44″N 121°28′22.33″E
- Capacity: 18,000 (indoor arena); 5,000 (indoor swimming pool, seated); 5,000 (outdoor swimming pool, seated)

Construction
- Built: 2008–2011
- Opened: July 2011
- Cost: yuan ¥2 billion USD $ 313 million EUR € 230 million
- Architect: Gerkan, Marg and Partners

Tenant
- Shanghai Skywalkers

The Shanghai SPD Bank Oriental Sports Center (Chinese: 上海浦发银行东方体育中心), also known as the Shanghai Aquatic Sports Center, is a sports venue next to the Expo Park in Shanghai's Pudong New Area. It started construction on 30 December 2008, and was completed in late 2010. The total investment was two billion yuan.

The center has an indoor arena named Indoor Stadium seating 18,000, an indoor swimming pool seating 5,000, and an outdoor swimming pool also seating 5,000. The Shanghai Oriental Sports Center is close to Huangpu River and near the Oriental Sports Center station on the Shanghai Metro.

== Indoor stadium ==
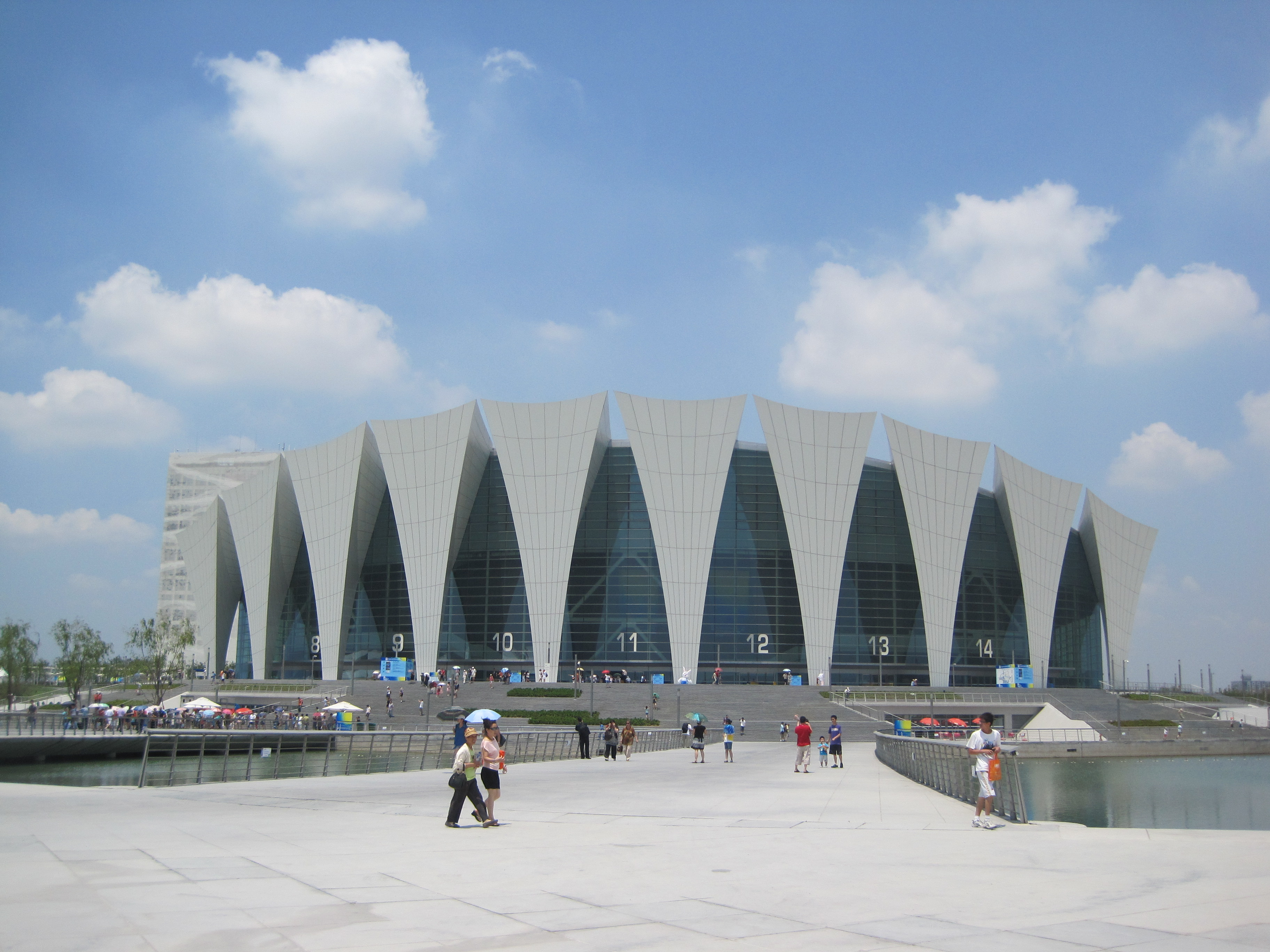
Shanghai Oriental Sports Center

The main venue at the sports complex is the Indoor Stadium, used for the home games of the arena football club Shanghai Skywalkers. It has a capacity of 18,000 and it is used for various events, like arena football, speed skating, basketball, mixed martial arts, figure skating, swimming and esports.

== Notable events ==
- 14th World Aquatics Championships from 16 to 31 July 2011
- 2012 World Short Track Speed Skating Championships
- 2014 FINA Diving World Cup
- 2015 World Figure Skating Championships 23–29 March 2015
- Road FC 27
- 2016 League of Legends Mid-Season Invitational
- 2017 League of Legends World Championship Semifinals
- Perfect World Shanghai Major 2024 Playoffs
- KHL World Games 2026
- The International 2026 Playoffs
- Identity V Call of the Abyss IX Playoffs
- UFC Fight Night: Nurmagomedov vs. Song

== Structure ==
The arena was designed by German architecture firm GMP. The facility sits on a man-made lake that connects to the Huangpu River. The sport center's area is 34.75 hectares (85.9 acres); the floor space is 163,800 square metres (1,763,000 sq ft). In the construction, the workers used 3,000 tons steel to build the architecture.

== Gallery ==
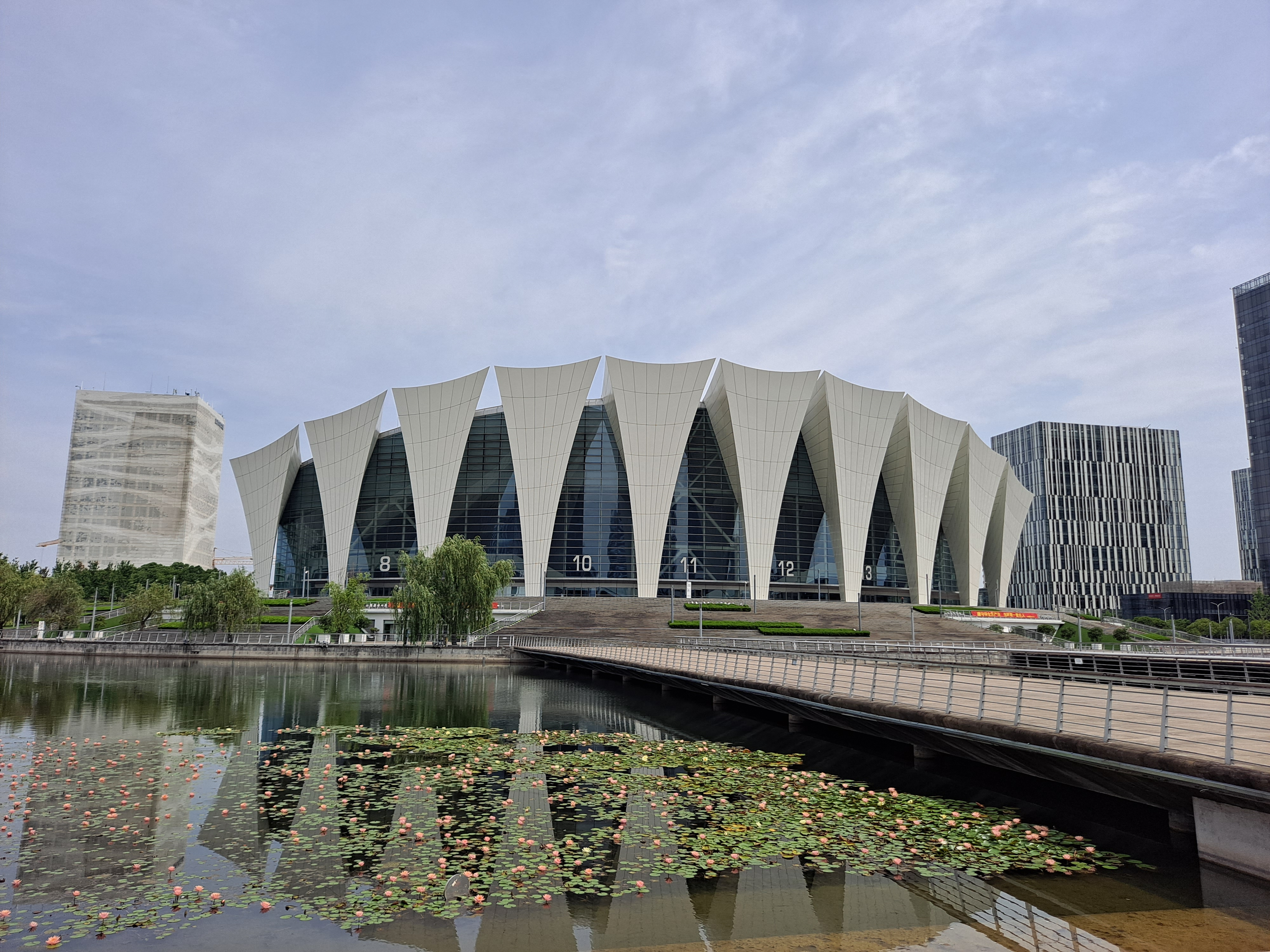

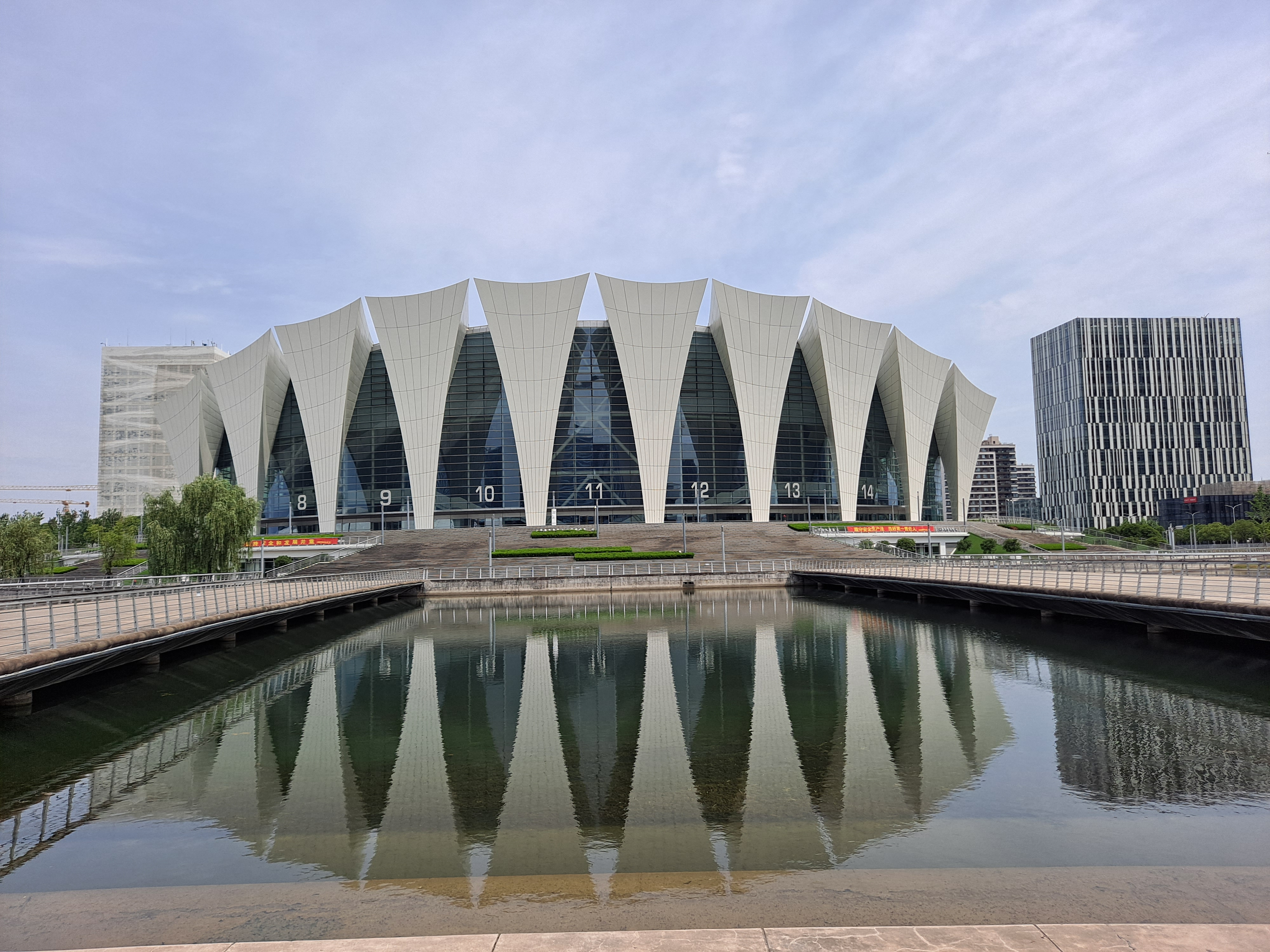

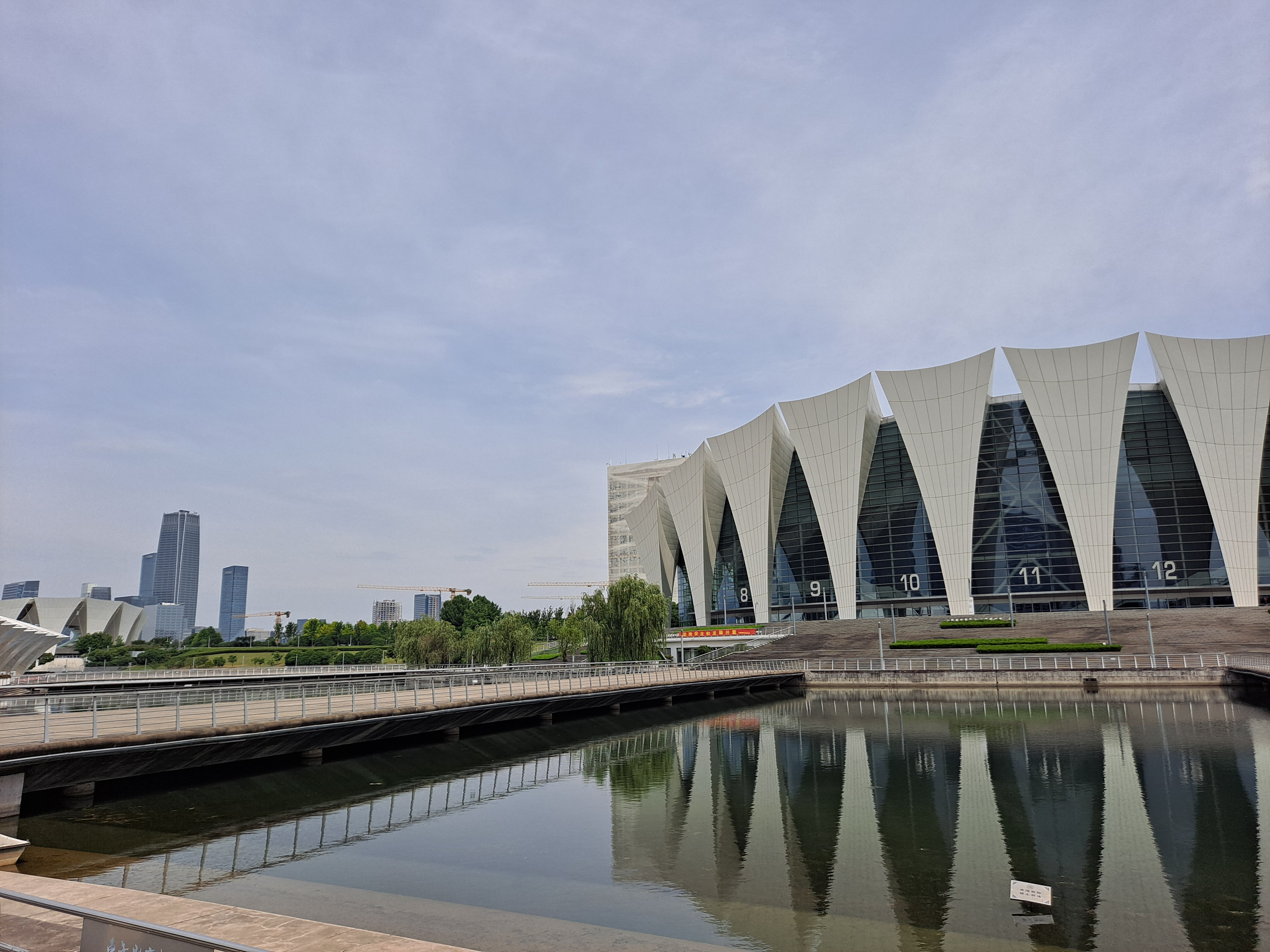

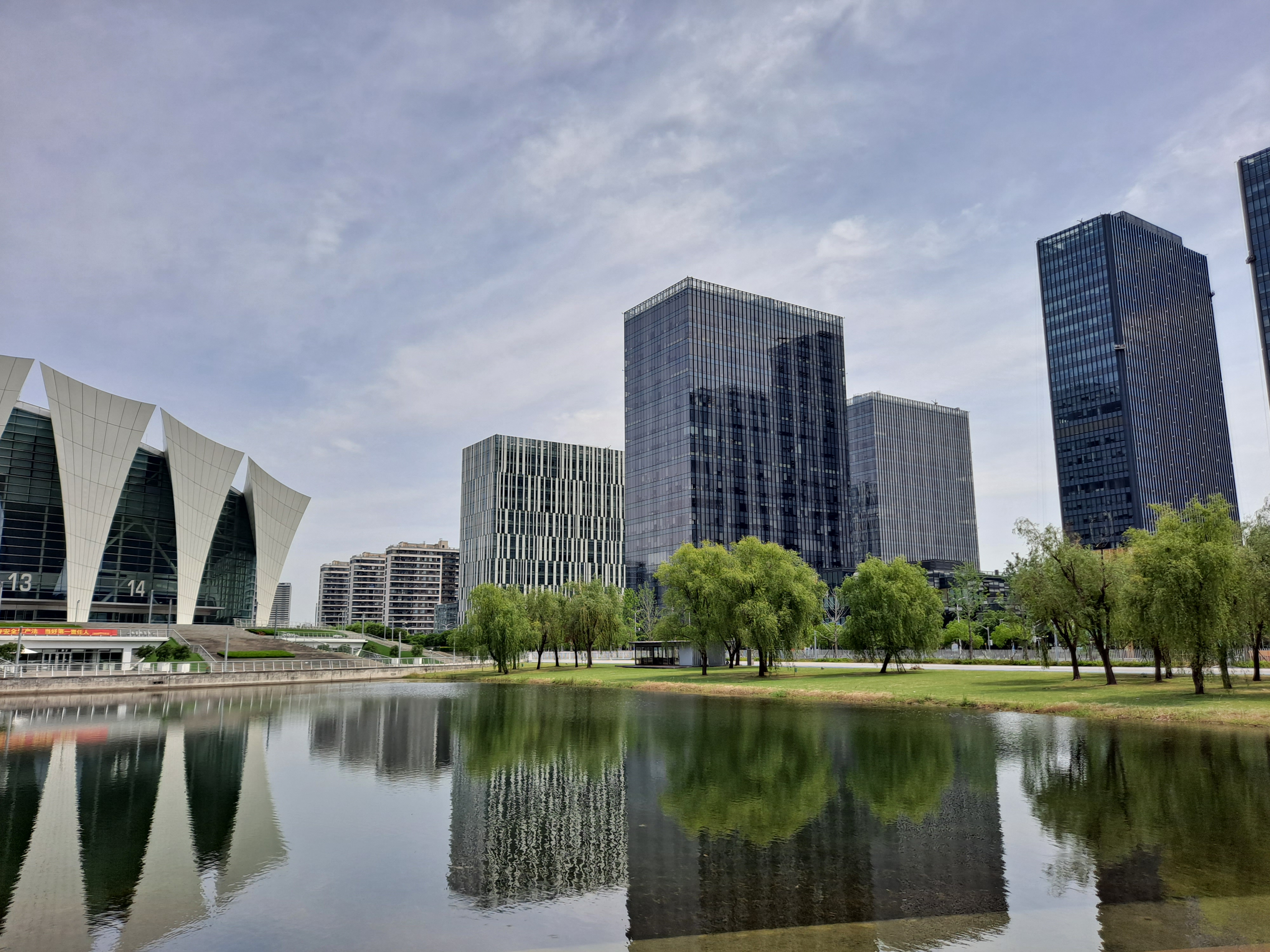

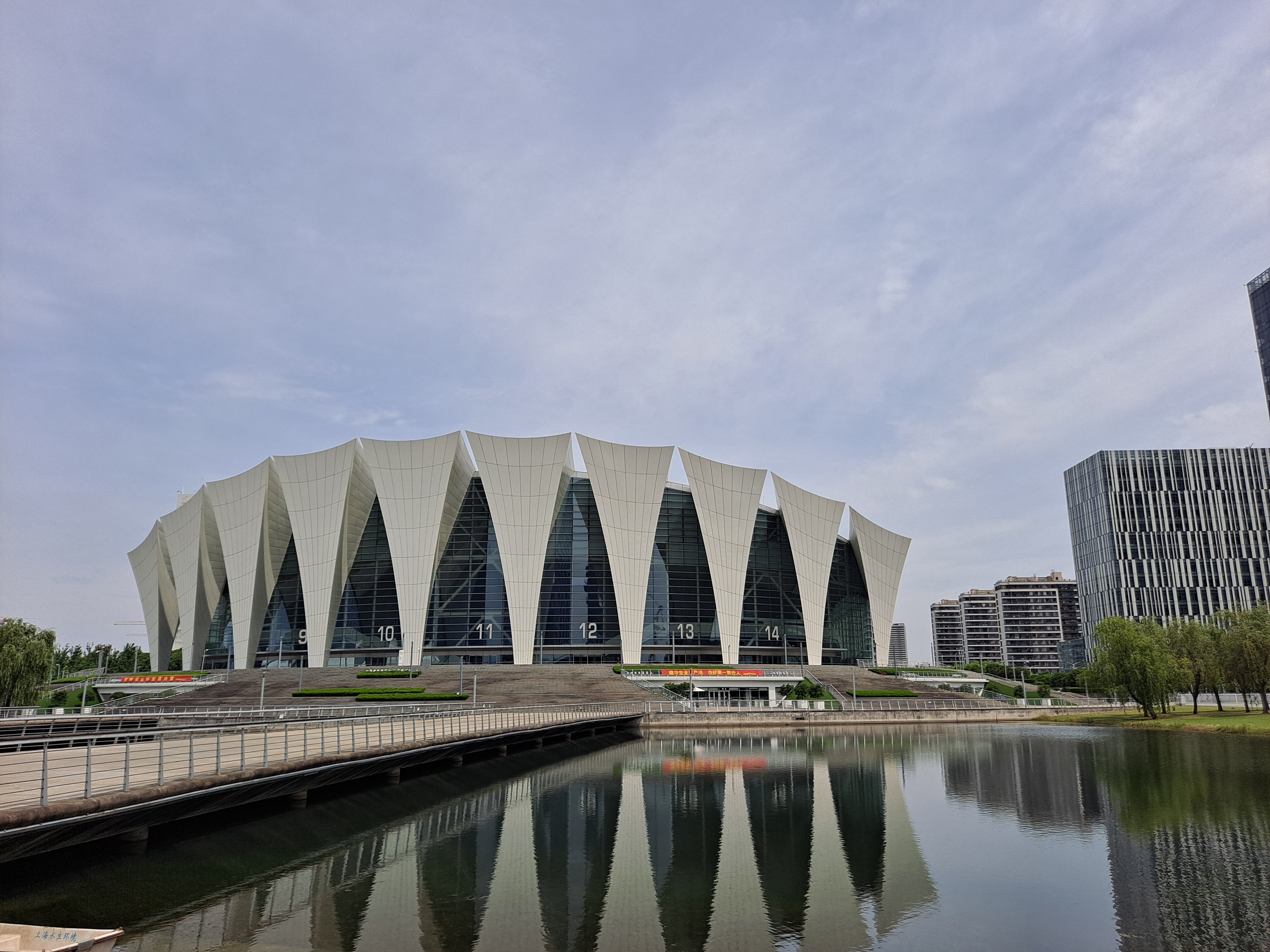

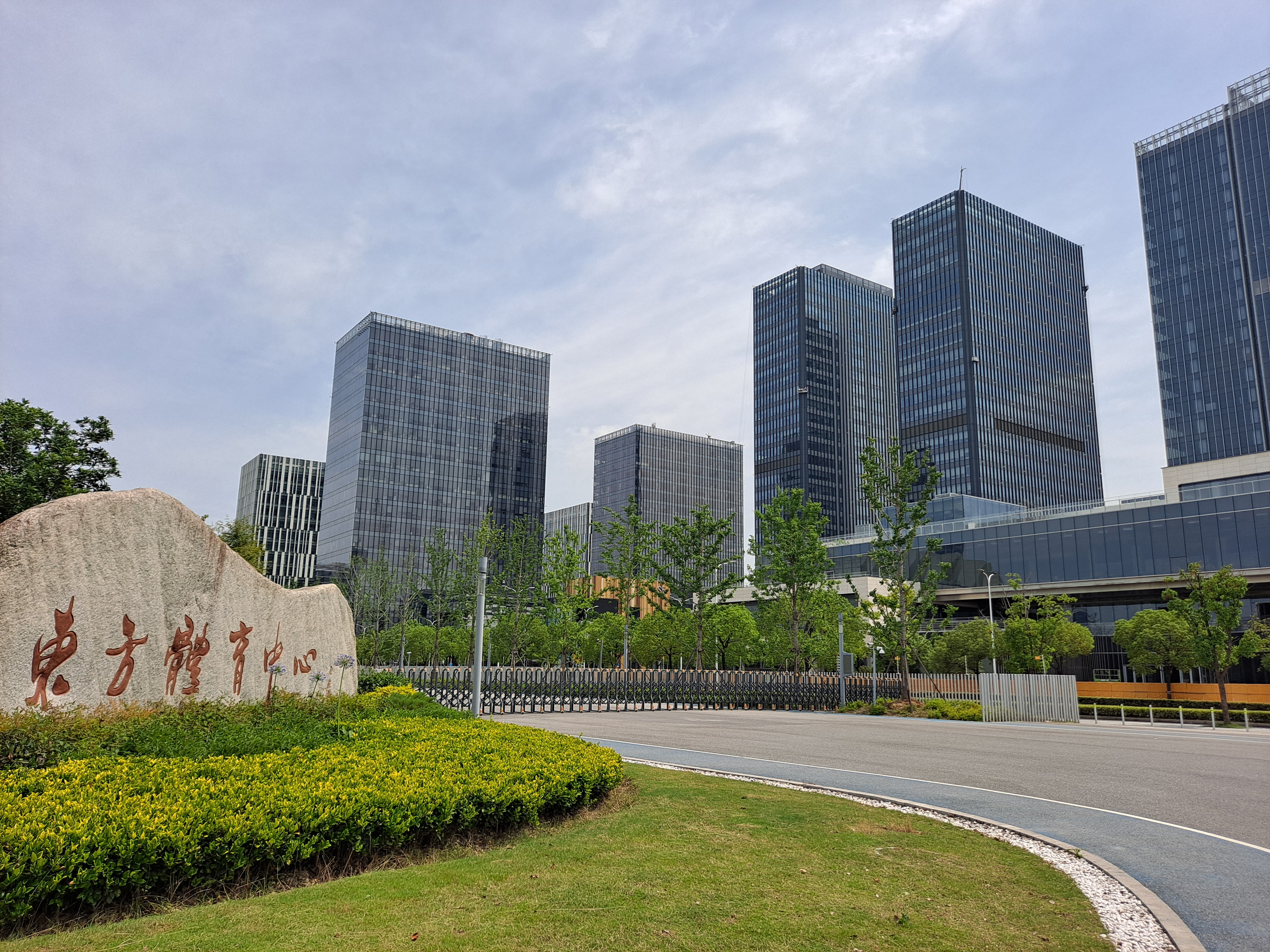

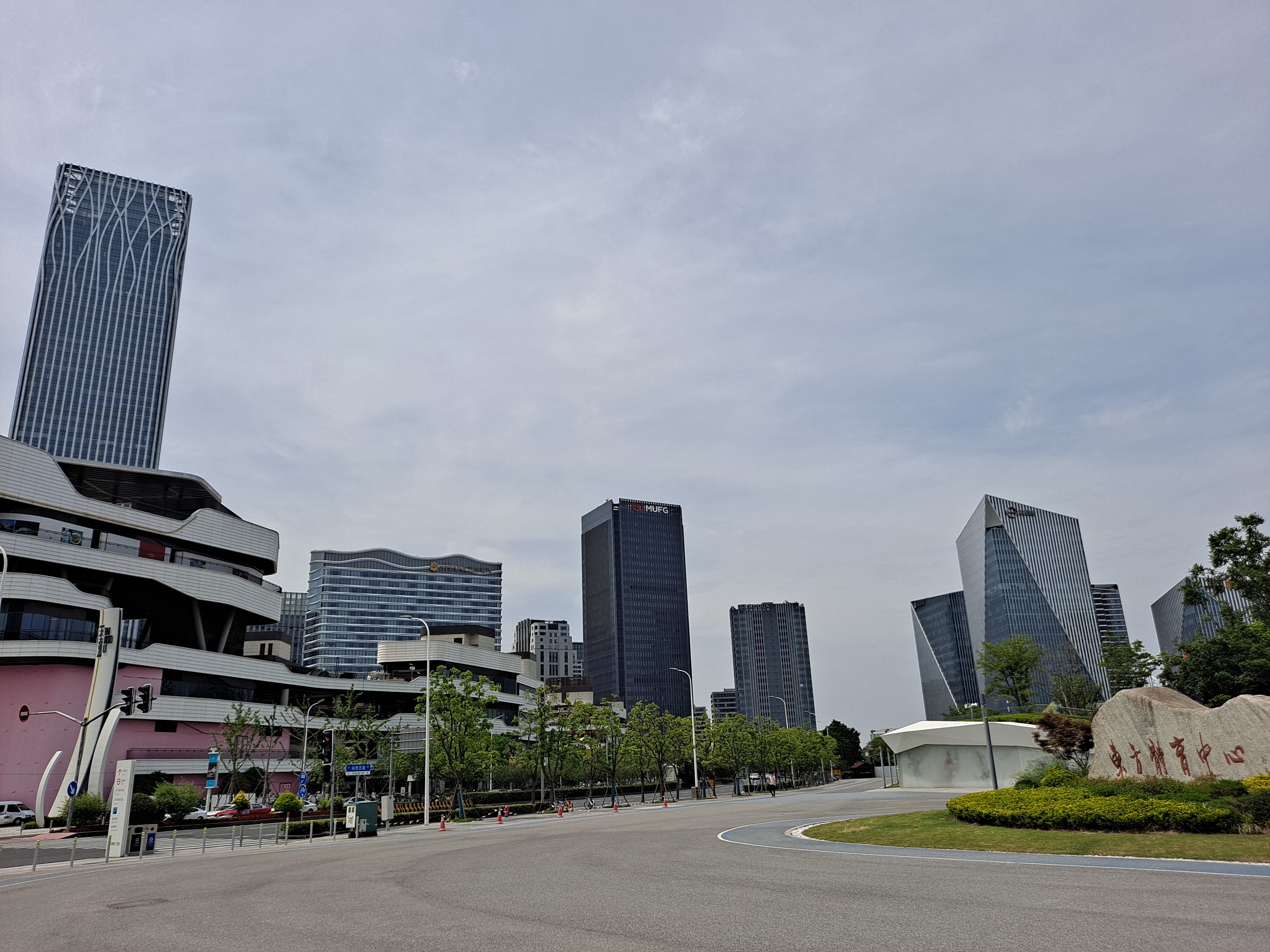

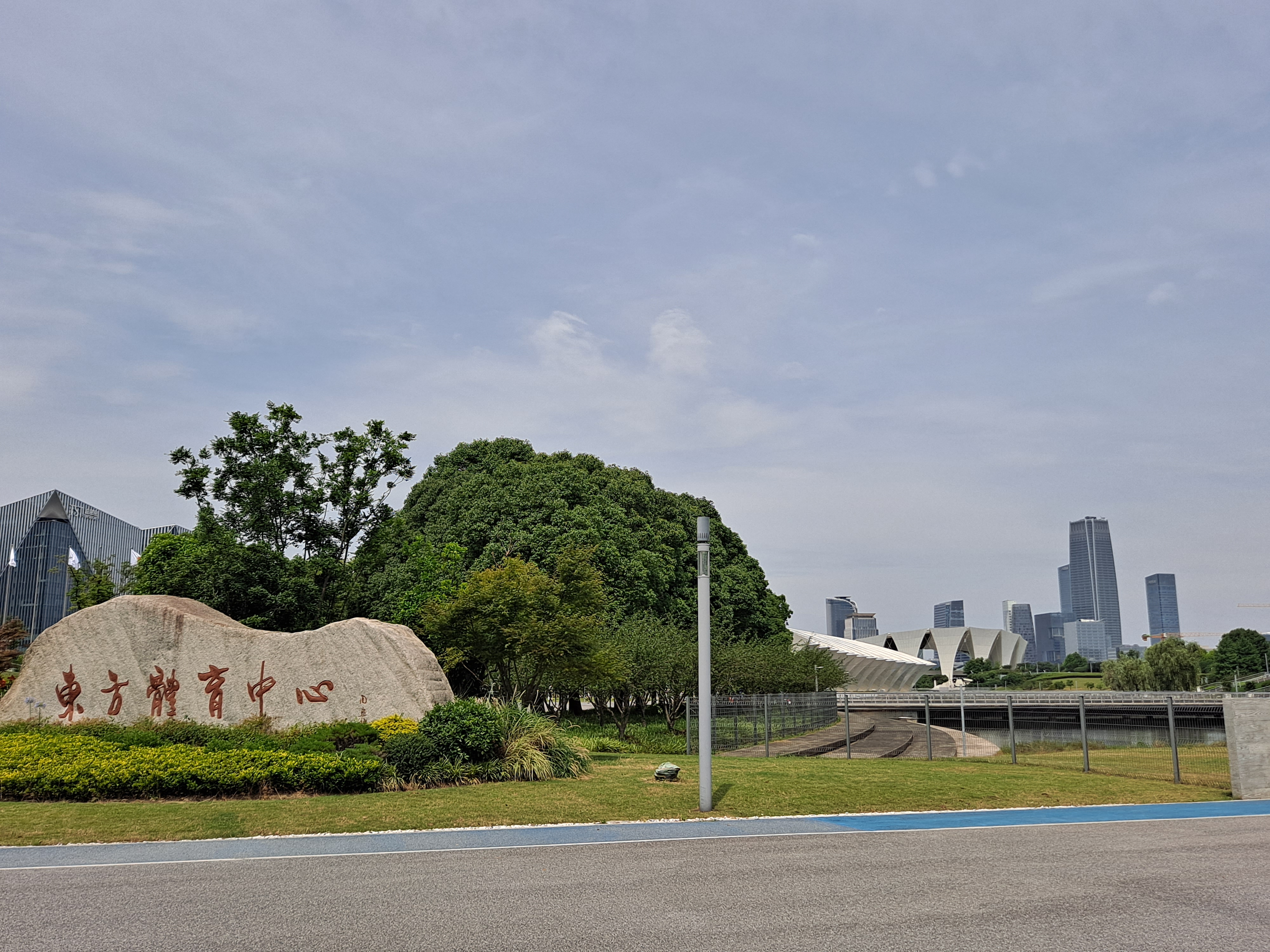

Preceded by Foro Italico; Rome	FINA World Aquatics Championships; Venue; 2011	Succeeded by Palau Sant Jordi; Barcelona
Preceded by Sheffield Arena; Sheffield	World Short Track Speed Skating Championships; Venue; 2012	Succeeded by Főnix Hall; Debrecen
Preceded by Capital Indoor Stadium; Beijing	Cup of China; Venue; 2011, 2012, 2014	Succeeded by Capital Indoor Stadium; Beijing
Preceded by Saitama Super Arena; Saitama (city)	World Figure Skating Championships; Venue; 2015	Succeeded by TD Garden; Boston
