= Nippon Gaishi Hall =

Indoor sports arena in Japan

Coordinates: 35°05′45.32″N 136°55′23.78″E

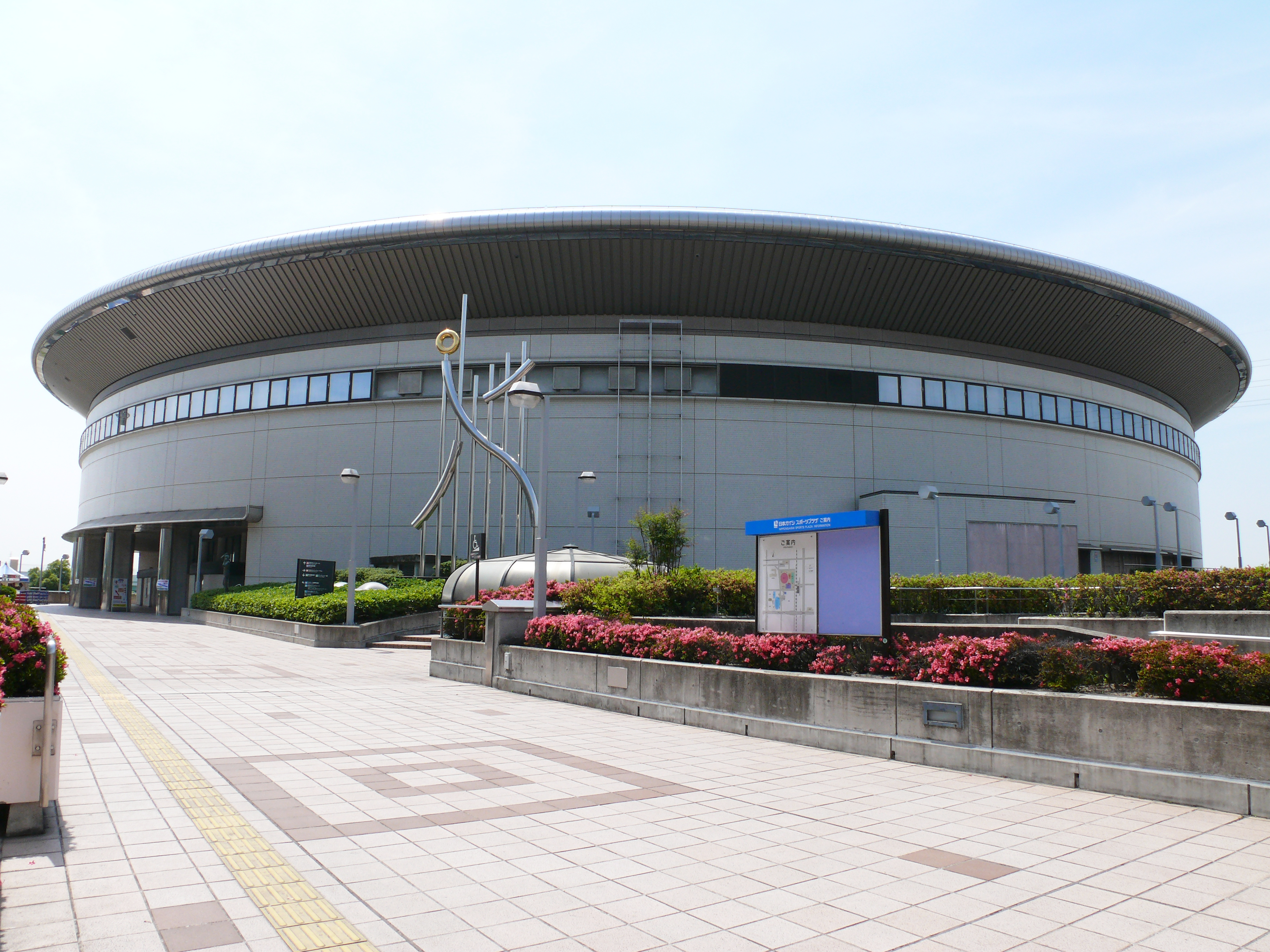
- Interactive map of Nippon Gaishi Hall
- Full name: Nagoya Civic General Gymnasium
- Former names: Nagoya Rainbow Hall (1987–2007)
- Location: Nagoya, Aichi Prefecture, Japan
- Owner: City of Nagoya
- Operator: Nagoya City Education and Sports Promotion Agency
- Capacity: 10,000
- Public transit: JR Central: Tōkaidō Main Line at Kasadera

Construction
- Opened: July 19, 1987

Tenant
- 2026 Asian Games

Nagoya Civic General Gymnasium (名古屋市総合体育館, Nagoya-shi Sōgō Taiikukan), formerly Nagoya Rainbow Hall, is an indoor sports arena located in Nagoya, Aichi, Japan. From April 1, 2007, its name was changed to Nippon Gaishi Hall, to reflect the sponsorship of the NGK Insulators. The capacity of the arena is 10,000 people.

The hall hosted some of the group games for the 2006 and 2010 editions of the official Women's Volleyball World Championship.

It hosted Dream 16, the mixed martial arts promotion in Japan on September 25, 2010. The card was headlined by a triple main event, as Shinya Aoki takes on Marcus Aurelio in a Lightweight non-title match, MMA legend Kazushi Sakuraba met Jason "Mayhem" Miller and Tatsuya Mizuno vs. Gegard Mousasi vied in the Dream Light-Heavyweight Grand Prix Final. The card was broadcast live by HDNet at 2AM US Eastern time.

== Nippon Gaishi Arena ==
Nippon Gaishi Arena is a smaller adjacent facility, which is used as a swimming venue, predominantly. It is used as an Ice rink in winter.

- Capacity: 3,500 (ice rink/swimming events)
