= February 2011 in sports =

<<	February 2011					>>
Su	Mo	Tu	We	Th	Fr	Sa
		1	2	3	4	5
6	7	8	9	10	11	12
13	14	15	16	17	18	19
20	21	22	23	24	25	26
27	28

This list shows notable sports-related deaths, events, and notable outcomes that occurred in February of 2011.

== Deaths in February ==
- 8: Cesare Rubini
- 27: Duke Snider

== Current sporting seasons ==
=== Auto racing 2011 ===
- Sprint Cup
- Nationwide Series
- Camping World Truck Series
- World Rally Championship
- V8 Supercar
- GP2 Asia Series
- Rolex Sports Car Series

=== Basketball 2011 ===
- NBA
- NCAA Division I men
- NCAA Division I women
- Euroleague
- EuroLeague Women
- Eurocup
- EuroChallenge
- France
- Germany
- Greece
- Israel
- Italy
- Philippines
  - Commissioner's Cup
- Russia
- Spain
- Turkey

=== Darts 2011 ===
- Premier League

=== Football (soccer) 2011 ===
National teams competitions

- UEFA Euro 2012 qualifying
- 2012 Africa Cup of Nations qualification

International clubs competitions

- UEFA (Europe) Champions League
- UEFA Europa League
- UEFA Women's Champions League
- Copa Libertadores (South America)
- AFC (Asia) Champions League
- CAF (Africa) Champions League
- CAF Confederation Cup
- CONCACAF (North & Central America) Champions League
- OFC (Oceania) Champions League

Domestic (national) competitions

- Argentina
- Australia
- England
- France
- Germany
- Iran
- Italy
- Scotland
- Spain

=== Golf 2011 ===
- PGA Tour
- European Tour
- LPGA Tour
- Champions Tour

=== Ice hockey 2011 ===
- National Hockey League
- Kontinental Hockey League
- Czech Extraliga
- Elitserien
- Canadian Hockey League:
  - OHL, QMJHL, WHL
- NCAA Division I men
- NCAA Division I women

=== Motorcycle racing 2011 ===
- Superbike World Championship
- Supersport World Championship

=== Rugby league 2011 ===
- Super League

=== Rugby union 2011 ===
- Heineken Cup
- European Challenge Cup
- English Premiership
- Celtic League
- LV Cup
- Top 14
- Super Rugby
- Sevens World Series

=== Snooker 2011 ===
- Players Tour Championship

=== Tennis 2011 ===
- ATP World Tour
- WTA Tour

=== Volleyball 2011 ===
International clubs competitions

- Men's CEV Champions League
- Women's CEV Champions League

Domestic (national) competitions

- Iranian Men's Super League
- Philippine collegiate (UAAP)

=== Winter sports ===
- Alpine Skiing World Cup
- Biathlon World Cup
- Cross-Country Skiing World Cup
- Freestyle Skiing World Cup
- Nordic Combined World Cup
- Ski Jumping World Cup
- Snowboard World Cup
- Speed Skating World Cup

== Days of the month ==
=== February 28, 2011 (Monday) ===
==== Cricket ====
- World Cup:
  - Group A: Zimbabwe 298/9 (50 overs); Canada 123 (42.1 overs) in Nagpur, India. **Zimbabwe win by 175 runs**.
    - Standings (after 2 matches): Pakistan, Australia 4 points, Sri Lanka, New Zealand, Zimbabwe 2, Canada, Kenya 0.
  - Group B: West Indies 330/8 (50 overs); Netherlands 115 (31.3 overs; Kemar Roach 6/27) in New Delhi, India. **West Indies win by 215 runs**.
    - Roach bowls the sixth World Cup hat-trick, 28th in One Day Internationals, and the second by a West Indian bowler, dismissing Pieter Seelaar, Bernard Loots and Berend Westdijk to end the Dutch innings.
    - Standings: India, England 3 points (2 matches), West Indies 2 (2), South Africa 2 (1), Bangladesh 2 (2), Ireland 0 (1), Netherlands 0 (2).

==== Cross-country skiing ====
- Nordic World Ski Championships in Oslo, Norway:
  - Women's 10 km classical: (gold) Marit Bjørgen (NOR) 27:39.3 (silver) Justyna Kowalczyk (POL) 27:43.4 (bronze) Aino-Kaisa Saarinen (FIN) 27:49.0
    - Bjørgen wins her third title of the championships and seventh of her career.

==== Nordic combined ====
- Nordic World Ski Championships in Oslo, Norway:
  - Team normal hill/4 x 5 km: (gold) Austria (David Kreiner, Bernhard Gruber, Felix Gottwald, Mario Stecher) 48:07.8 (silver) Germany (Johannes Rydzek, Björn Kircheisen, Tino Edelmann, Eric Frenzel) 48:08.2 (bronze) Norway (Jan Schmid, Magnus Moan, Mikko Kokslien, Håvard Klemetsen) 48:48.4

=== February 27, 2011 (Sunday) ===
==== Alpine skiing ====
- Women's World Cup in Åre, Sweden:
  - Super-G: (gold) Maria Riesch (GER) 1:13.24 (silver) Lindsey Vonn (USA) 1:13.25 (bronze) Julia Mancuso (USA) 1:14.02
    - Super-G standings (after 5 of 7 races): (1) Vonn 460 points (2) Riesch 329 (3) Lara Gut (SUI) 250
    - Overall standings (after 26 of 38 races): (1) Riesch 1516 points (2) Vonn 1320 (3) Elisabeth Görgl (AUT) 748
- Men's World Cup in Bansko, Bulgaria:
  - Slalom: (gold) Mario Matt (AUT) 1:50.35 (54.21 / 56.14) (silver) Reinfried Herbst (AUT) 1:50.39 (54.33 / 56.06) (bronze) Jean-Baptiste Grange (FRA) 1:50.83 (55.89 / 55.94)
    - Slalom standings (after 8 of 10 races): (1) Ivica Kostelić (CRO) 472 points (2) Grange 442 (3) André Myhrer (SWE) 333
    - Overall standings (after 29 of 38 races): (1) Kostelić 1294 points (2) Didier Cuche (SUI) 725 (3) Aksel Lund Svindal (NOR) 713

==== Auto racing ====
- Sprint Cup Series:
  - Subway Fresh Fit 500 in Avondale, Arizona: (1) (California) Jeff Gordon (Chevrolet; Hendrick Motorsports) (2) (Nevada) Kyle Busch (Toyota; Joe Gibbs Racing) (3) (California) Jimmie Johnson (Chevrolet; Hendrick Motorsports)
    - Gordon ends a 66-race winless streak to win his 83rd Cup race, and ties Cale Yarborough for fifth place on the all-time wins list.
    - Drivers' championship standings (after 2 of 36 races): (1) Kyle Busch 80 points (2) (Nevada) Kurt Busch (Dodge; Penske Racing) 77 (3) (Indiana) Tony Stewart (Chevrolet; Stewart Haas Racing) & (California) A. J. Allmendinger (Ford; Richard Petty Motorsports) 69

==== Bobsleigh ====
- FIBT World Championships in Königssee, Germany:
  - Four-man: (gold) Germany I (Manuel Machata, Andreas Bredau, Richard Adjei, Christian Poser) 3:16.58 (48.65 / 48.79 / 49.26 / 49.88) (2) Germany II (Karl Angerer, Gregor Bermbach, Alex Mann, Christian Friedrich) 3:17.10 (48.74 / 48.92 / 49.31 / 50.13) (3) United States I (Steve Holcomb, Justin Olsen, Steven Langton, Curtis Tomasevicz) 3:17.26 (48.81 / 49.01 / 49.46 / 49.98)
    - Machata, Bredau, Adjei and Poser all win their first world title.

==== Cricket ====
- World Cup:
  - Group B: India 338 (49.5 overs; Sachin Tendulkar 120, Tim Bresnan 5/48); England 338/8 (50 overs; Andrew Strauss 158) in Bangalore, India. **Match tied**.
    - Standings: India, England 3 points (2 matches), South Africa 2 (1), Bangladesh 2 (2), Netherlands, Ireland, West Indies 0 (1).

==== Cross-country skiing ====
- Nordic World Ski Championships in Oslo, Norway:
  - Men's 30 km pursuit: (gold) Petter Northug (NOR) 1:14:10.4 (silver) Maxim Vylegzhanin (RUS) 1:14:11.1 (bronze) Ilia Chernousov (RUS) 1:14:11.6
    - Northug wins his second successive title in this event and fifth world title overall.

==== Equestrianism ====
- Show jumping:
  - FEI World Cup – Western European League:
    - 12th competition in Gothenburg (CSI 5*-W): (gold) Angelica Augustsson (SWE) on Midtown du Tillard (silver) Edwina Alexander (AUS) on Ciske van Overis (bronze) Ludger Beerbaum (GER) on Gotha
      - Standings (after 12 of 13 competitions): (1) Kevin Staut (FRA) 87 points (2) Meredith Michaels-Beerbaum (GER) 73 (3) Rolf-Göran Bengtsson (SWE) 73

==== Football (soccer) ====
- CONCACAF U-17 Championship in Montego Bay, Jamaica:
  - Third-place match: (bronze) **Panama** 1–0 Jamaica
  - Final: (silver) Canada 0–3 (a.e.t.) (gold) **United States**
    - The United States win the under-17 tournament for the first time.
- OFC Champions League Group stage, matchday 5 (team in **bold** advance to the final):
  - Group B: **Auckland City FC** (New Zealand) 1–0 (New Zealand) Waitakere United
    - Standings (after 5 matches): Auckland City FC 11 points, (New Caledonia) AS Magenta 7, Waitakere United 5, (French Polynesia) AS Tefana 4.
- (England) League Cup final in London:
  - Arsenal 1–2 **Birmingham City**
    - Birmingham City win the League Cup for the second time and qualify for UEFA Europa League.
- (Brazil) Campeonato Carioca:
  - Taça Guanabara Final: **Flamengo** 1–0 Boavista
    - Flamengo win the title for the 19th time.

==== Golf ====
- World Golf Championships:
  - WGC-Accenture Match Play Championship in Marana, Arizona, United States:
    - Final: **Luke Donald** (ENG) def. Martin Kaymer (GER) 3 & 2
      - Donald wins his first individual WGC event, for his third PGA Tour title and fourth on the European Tour.
      - Kaymer will replace Lee Westwood (ENG) at the top of the official world rankings, ending Westwood's 17-week run.
    - Consolation match: **Matt Kuchar** (USA) def. Bubba Watson (USA) 2 & 1
- PGA Tour:
  - Mayakoba Golf Classic at Riviera Maya in Cancún, Mexico:
    - Winner: Johnson Wagner (USA) 267 (−17)^{PO}
      - Wagner defeats Spencer Levin (USA) on the first playoff hole, for his second PGA Tour title.
- LPGA Tour:
  - HSBC Women's Champions in Singapore:
    - Winner: Karrie Webb (AUS) 275 (−13)
      - Webb wins her 37th LPGA Tour title, and first in nearly two years.

==== Mixed martial arts ====
- UFC 127 in Sydney, Australia:
  - Welterweight bout: B.J. Penn (USA) and Jon Fitch (USA) fought to a majority draw (29–28 Fitch, 28–28, 28–28)
  - Middleweight bout: **Michael Bisping** (ENG) def. Jorge Rivera (USA) by TKO (strikes)
  - Lightweight bout: **Dennis Siver** (GER) def. George Sotiropoulos (AUS) by unanimous decision (29–28, 30–28, 30–27)
  - Welterweight bout: **Brian Ebersole** (USA) def. Chris Lytle (USA) by unanimous decision (30–27, 29–28, 29–28)
  - Middleweight bout: **Kyle Noke** (AUS) def. Chris Camozzi (USA) by submission (rear naked choke)

==== Motorcycle racing ====
- Superbike:
  - Phillip Island World Championship round in Phillip Island, Australia:
    - Race 1: (1) Carlos Checa (ESP) (Ducati 1198) (2) Max Biaggi (ITA) (Aprilia RSV4) (3) Leon Haslam (GBR) (BMW S1000RR)
    - Race 2: (1) Checa (2) Biaggi (3) Marco Melandri (ITA) (Yamaha YZF-R1)
- Supersport:
  - Phillip Island World Championship round in Phillip Island, Australia: (1) Luca Scassa (ITA) (Yamaha YZF-R6) (2) Broc Parkes (AUS) (Kawasaki Ninja ZX-6R) (3) Sam Lowes (GBR) (Honda CBR600RR)

==== Rugby league ====
- World Club Challenge in Wigan, England:
  - Wigan Warriors (England) 15–21 (Australia) **St. George Illawarra Dragons**
    - The Dragons win at their first attempt, and become the fifth Australian side to win the Challenge.

==== Rugby union ====
- Six Nations Championship, week 3:
  - Scotland 18–21 Ireland in Edinburgh
    - Ireland's Ronan O'Gara takes over from England's Jonny Wilkinson as the leading career point scorer in the Championship with 543 points, two ahead of Wilkinson.
    - Standings (after 3 matches): England 6 points, Wales, France, Ireland 4, Scotland, Italy 0.

==== Short-track speed skating ====
- World Junior Championships in Courmayeur, Italy:
  - Men's 1000 m: (1) Jack Whelbourne (GBR) 1:26.049 (2) Seo Yi Ra (KOR) 1:26.086 (3) Shi Jingnan (CHN) 1:26.312
  - Men's 1500 m super final: (1) Seo 2:13.990 (2) Whelbourne 2:19.895 (3) Shi 2:20.144
    - Men's final standings: (gold) Seo 89 points (silver) Whelbourne 76 (bronze) Wu Dajing (CHN) 40
  - Women's 1000 m: (1) Ahn Se Jung (KOR) 1:31.336 (2) Noh Do Hee (KOR) 1:31.446 (3) Xiao Han (CHN) 1:31.527
  - Women's 1500 m super final: (1) Cheon Hee Jung (KOR) 2:38.268 (2) Noh 2:38.339 (3) Ahn 2:38.408
    - Women's final standings: (gold) Cheon 68 points (silver) Ahn 68 (bronze) Martina Valcepina (ITA) 50
  - Men's 3000 m relay: (gold) France (Thibault Crolet, Sebastien LePape, Alexis Yang, Vincent Giannitrapani) 4:08.911 (silver) Japan (Minto Sekai, Keita Watanabe, Hiroki Yokoyama, Masashi Yoshikawa) 4:09.923 (bronze) Canada (Patrick Duffy, Pier-Olivier Gagnon, Alexandre St. Jean, Maxime Gauthier) 4:15.867
  - Women's 3000 m relay: (gold) Italy (Yelenia Tota, Arianna Valcepina, Martina Valcepina, Elena Viviani) 4:20.004 (silver) Canada (Laurie Marceau, Cynthia Mascitto, Ann-Veronique Michaud, Courtney Shmyr) 4:20.166 (bronze) China (Xhao, Lin Meng, Jingzhu Jin, Shaoyang Zhang) 4:32.995

==== Ski jumping ====
- Nordic World Ski Championships in Oslo, Norway:
  - Men's team normal hill: (gold) Austria (Gregor Schlierenzauer, Martin Koch, Andreas Kofler, Thomas Morgenstern) 1025.5 points (silver) Norway (Anders Jacobsen, Bjørn Einar Romøren, Anders Bardal, Tom Hilde) 1000.5 (bronze) Germany (Martin Schmitt, Michael Neumayer, Michael Uhrmann, Severin Freund) 968.2
    - Morgenstern wins his second title of the championships and the sixth of his career.

==== Tennis ====
- ATP World Tour:
  - Delray Beach International Tennis Championships in Delray Beach, United States:
    - Final: **Juan Martín del Potro** (ARG) def. Janko Tipsarević (SRB) 6–4, 6–4
      - Del Potro wins his eighth career title, and his first since winning the 2009 US Open.

=== February 26, 2011 (Saturday) ===
==== Alpine skiing ====
- Women's World Cup in Åre, Sweden:
  - Downhill: (gold) Lindsey Vonn (USA) 1:40.93 (silver) Tina Maze (SLO) 1:41.06 (bronze) Maria Riesch (GER) 1:41.14
    - Downhill standings (after 6 of 9 races): (1) Vonn 520 points (2) Riesch 417 (3) Julia Mancuso (USA) 241
    - Overall standings (after 25 of 38 races): (1) Riesch 1416 points (2) Vonn 1240 (3) Elisabeth Görgl (AUT) 738
- Men's World Cup in Bansko, Bulgaria:
  - Super combined: (gold) Christof Innerhofer (ITA) 2:23.87 (1:01.12 / 1:22.75) (silver) Felix Neureuther (GER) 2:23.88 (59.92 / 1:23.96) (bronze) Thomas Mermillod-Blondin (FRA) 2:24.20 (1:01.68 / 1:22.52)
    - Final combined standings: (1) Ivica Kostelić (CRO) 345 points (2) Innerhofer 219 (3) Kjetil Jansrud (NOR) 145
      - Kostelić wins his first combined World Cup title, and his first discipline title in nine years.
    - Overall standings (after 28 of 38 races): (1) Kostelić 1294 points (2) Didier Cuche (SUI) 725 (3) Aksel Lund Svindal (NOR) 713

==== Auto racing ====
- Nationwide Series:
  - Bashas' Supermarkets 200 in Phoenix, Arizona: (1) (Nevada) Kyle Busch (Toyota; Joe Gibbs Racing) (2) (Missouri) Carl Edwards (Ford; Roush Fenway Racing) (3) (California) Kevin Harvick (Chevrolet; Kevin Harvick Incorporated)
    - Drivers' championship standings (after 2 of 34 races): (1) (Georgia (U.S. state)) Reed Sorenson (Chevrolet; Turner Motorsports) 78 points (2) (Mississippi) Ricky Stenhouse Jr. (Ford; Roush Fenway Racing) 73 (3) (California) Jason Leffler (Chevrolet; Turner Motorsports) 71

==== Bobsleigh ====
- FIBT World Championships in Königssee, Germany:
  - Four-man standings after 2 runs: (1) Germany I (Manuel Machata, Andreas Bredau, Richard Adjei, Christian Poser) 1:37.44 (2) Germany II (Karl Angerer, Gregor Bermbach, Alex Mann, Christian Friedrich) 1:37.66 (3) Russia I (Alexandr Zubkov, Filipp Yegorov, Dmitry Trunenkov, Nikolay Hrenkov) 1:37.78

==== Cricket ====
- World Cup:
  - Group A: Pakistan 277/7 (50 overs); Sri Lanka 266/9 (50 overs) in Colombo, Sri Lanka. **Pakistan win by 11 runs**.
    - Standings: Pakistan, Australia 4 points (2 matches), Sri Lanka, New Zealand 2 (2), Zimbabwe, Canada 0 (1), Kenya 0 (2).

==== Cross-country skiing ====
- Nordic World Ski Championships in Oslo, Norway:
  - Women's 15 km pursuit: (gold) Marit Bjørgen (NOR) 38:08.6 (silver) Justyna Kowalczyk (POL) 38:16.1 (bronze) Therese Johaug (NOR) 38:17.4
    - Bjørgen wins her second title of the championships, and the sixth of her career.

==== Equestrianism ====
- Dressage:
  - FEI World Cup Western European League:
    - 9th competition in Gothenburg (CDI-W): (gold) Adelinde Cornelissen (NED) on Parzival (silver) Patrik Kittel (SWE) on Watermill Scandic (bronze) Isabell Werth (GER) on Warum nicht FRH
      - Standings (after 9 of 10 competitions): (1) Cornelissen 80 points (2) Ulla Salzgeber (GER) 77 (3) Werth 74
- Show jumping:
  - FEI World Cup North American League – West Coast:
    - 14th competition in Thermal, California (CSI 2*-W): (gold) Mark Watring (PUR) on Vioco (silver) Rich Fellers (USA) on Flexible (bronze) Susan Hutchison (USA) on Cantano

==== Football (soccer) ====
- OFC Champions League Group stage, matchday 5:
  - Group A:
    - Koloale (Solomon Islands) 2–1 (Papua New Guinea) PRK Hekari United
    - Amicale (Vanuatu) 5–1 (Fiji) Lautoka
      - Standings (after 5 matches): Amicale 10 points, Lautoka 7, Koloale 6, PRK Hekari United 5.

==== Freestyle skiing ====
- World Cup in Mariánské Lázně, Czech Republic:
  - Men's Dual Moguls: (gold) Alexandre Bilodeau (CAN) 18.00 points (silver) Mikaël Kingsbury (CAN) 17.00 (bronze) Jeremy Cota (USA) 22.00
    - Moguls standings (after 8 of 11 events): (1) Guilbaut Colas (FRA) 581 points (2) Kingsbury 535 (3) Bilodeau 479
    - Overall standings: (1) Colas 73 points (2) Andreas Matt (AUT) 71 (3) Kingsbury 67
  - Women's Dual Moguls: (gold) Hannah Kearney (USA) 19.00 points (silver) Jennifer Heil (CAN) 16.00 (bronze) Chloé Dufour-Lapointe (CAN) 19.00
    - Moguls standings (after 8 of 11 events): (1) Kearney 709 points (2) Heil 492 (3) Audrey Robichaud (CAN) 350
    - Overall standings: (1) Kearney 89 points (2) Cheng Shuang (CHN) 63 (3) Heil 62

==== Nordic combined ====
- Nordic World Ski Championships in Oslo, Norway:
  - Individual normal hill/10 km: (gold) Eric Frenzel (GER) 25:19.2 (silver) Tino Edelmann (GER) 25:31.1 (bronze) Felix Gottwald (AUT) 25:37.6
    - Frenzel wins his first world title.

==== Rugby union ====
- Six Nations Championship, week 3:
  - Italy 16–24 Wales in Rome
  - England 17–9 France in London
    - England's Jonny Wilkinson reclaims his place as the highest point scorer in Test rugby with 1190 points, two ahead of Dan Carter (NZL).
    - Standings: England 6 points (3 matches), Wales, France 4 (3), Ireland 2 (2), Scotland 0 (2), Italy 0 (3).
- European Nations Cup First Division, week 3:
  - Portugal 12–13 Georgia in Lisbon
  - Romania 33–3 Russia in Bucharest
  - Spain 35–13 Ukraine in Madrid
    - Standings: Georgia 14 points (3 matches), Portugal 9 (3), Spain 6 (3), Romania 5 (2), Russia 5 (3), Ukraine 0 (2).

==== Short-track speed skating ====
- World Junior Championships in Courmayeur, Italy:
  - Men's 500 m: (1) Liu Songbo (CHN) 43.065 (2) Wu Dajing (CHN) 50.424
  - Women's 500 m: (1) Martina Valcepina (ITA) 45.136 (2) Lara van Ruijven (NED) 45.470 (3) Lin Meng (CHN) 45.622

==== Skeleton ====
- FIBT World Championships in Königssee, Germany:
  - Women: (gold) Marion Thees (GER) 3:28.51 (52.22 / 52.21 / 52.07 / 52.01) (silver) Anja Huber (GER) 3:29.39 (52.44 / 52.14 / 52.35 / 52.46) (bronze) Mellisa Hollingsworth (CAN) 3:29.74 (52.64 / 52.34 / 52.46 / 52.30)
    - Thees wins her second consecutive world title.

==== Ski jumping ====
- Nordic World Ski Championships in Oslo, Norway:
  - Men's individual normal hill: (gold) Thomas Morgenstern (AUT) 269.2 points (silver) Andreas Kofler (AUT) 260.1 (bronze) Adam Małysz (POL) 252.2
    - Morgenstern wins his first individual world title, and fifth overall.

==== Snowboarding ====
- World Cup in Calgary, Alberta, Canada:
  - Men's halfpipe: (gold) Ryō Aono (JPN) 28.3 points (silver) Nathan Johnstone (AUS) 27.7 (bronze) Zhang Yiwei (CHN) 27.0
    - Halfpipe standings (after 4 of 6 events): (1) Aono 2800 points (2) Johnstone 2060 (3) Zhang 1470
  - Men's slopestyle: (gold) Clemens Schattschneider (AUT) 27.4 points (silver) Robby Balharry (CAN) 26.3 (bronze) Zachary Stone (CAN) 25.6
    - Big Air/Slopestyle standings (after 5 of 6 events): (1) Schattschneider 2360 points (2) Sebastien Toutant (CAN) 2220 (3) Rocco van Straten (NED) 1845
    - Freestyle overall standings: (1) Aono 2800 points (2) Schattschneider 2508 (3) Toutant 2220
  - Women's halfpipe: (gold) Cai Xuetong (CHN) 24.9 points (silver) Holly Crawford (AUS) 23.0 (bronze) Haruna Matsumoto (JPN) 22.3
    - Halfpipe standings (after 4 of 6 events): (1) Cai 3800 points (2) Crawford 2100 (3) Sun Zhifeng (CHN) 1940
  - Women's slopestyle: (gold) Allyson Carroll (USA) 21.0 points (silver) Brooke Voigt (CAN) 18.3 (bronze) Pia Meusburger (AUT) 15.4
    - Freestyle overall standings: (1) Cai 3800 points (2) Crawford 2100 (3) Sun 1940

==== Tennis ====
- ATP World Tour:
  - Dubai Duty Free Tennis Championships in Dubai, United Arab Emirates:
    - Final: **Novak Djokovic** (SRB) def. Roger Federer (SUI) 6–3, 6–3
      - Djokovic wins the tournament for the third consecutive year, and his 20th career title.
  - Abierto Mexicano Telcel in Acapulco, Mexico:
    - Final: **David Ferrer** (ESP) def. Nicolás Almagro (ESP) 7–6(4), 6–7(2), 6–2
      - Ferrer wins his second title of the year and 11th of his career, and his second consecutive win at the event.
- WTA Tour:
  - Qatar Ladies Open in Doha, Qatar:
    - Final: **Vera Zvonareva** (RUS) def. Caroline Wozniacki (DEN) 6–4, 6–4
      - Zvonareva wins the 11th title of her career.
  - Abierto Mexicano Telcel in Acapulco, Mexico:
    - Final: **Gisela Dulko** (ARG) def. Arantxa Parra Santonja (ESP) 6–3, 7–6(5)
      - Dulko wins the fourth title of her career.

=== February 25, 2011 (Friday) ===
==== Alpine skiing ====
- Women's World Cup in Åre, Sweden:
  - Super combined: (gold) Maria Riesch (GER) 1:59.60 (1:14.21 / 45.39) (silver) Tina Maze (SLO) 2:00.00 (1:14.81 / 45.19) (bronze) Elisabeth Görgl (AUT) 2:00.26 (1:14.40 / 45.86)
    - Combined standings (after 2 of 3 races): (1) Riesch 145 points (2) Görgl & Lindsey Vonn (USA) 140
    - Overall standings (after 24 of 38 races): (1) Riesch 1356 points (2) Vonn 1140 (3) Görgl 738

==== Cricket ====
- World Cup:
  - Group A: New Zealand 206 (45.1 overs); Australia 207/3 (34 overs) in Nagpur, India. **Australia win by 7 wickets.**
    - Standings: Australia 4 points (2 matches), Sri Lanka, Pakistan 2 (1), New Zealand 2 (2), Zimbabwe, Canada 0 (1), Kenya 0 (2).
  - Group B: Bangladesh 205 (49.2 overs); Ireland 178 (45 overs) in Mirpur Thana, Bangladesh. **Bangladesh win by 27 runs.**
    - Standings: India, South Africa, England 2 points (1 match), Bangladesh 2 (2), Netherlands, Ireland, West Indies 0 (1).

==== Football (soccer) ====
- African Nations Championship in Omdurman, Sudan:
  - Third-place playoff: Algeria 0–1 (bronze) **Sudan**
  - Final: (gold) **Tunisia** 3–0 (silver) Angola
    - Tunisia win the title for the first time.
- CONCACAF U-17 Championship in Montego Bay, Jamaica:
  - Semifinals:
    - Panama 0–1 **Canada**
    - **United States** 2–0 Jamaica
- OFC Champions League Group stage, matchday 5:
  - Group B: AS Tefana (French Polynesia) 0–3 (New Caledonia) AS Magenta
    - Standings: (New Zealand) Auckland City FC 8 points (4 matches), AS Magenta 7 (5), (New Zealand) Waitakere United 5 (4), AS Tefana 4 (5).

==== Short-track speed skating ====
- World Junior Championships in Courmayeur, Italy:
  - Men's 1500 m: (1) Seo Yi-Ra (KOR) 2:20.410 (2) Jack Whelbourne (GBR) 2:20.592 (3) Lee Hyo-Been (KOR) 2:20.663
  - Women's 1500 m: (1) Cheon Hee-Jung (KOR) 2:28.227 (2) Ahn Se-Jung (KOR) 2:28.316 (3) Lin Meng (CHN) 2:28.858

==== Skeleton ====
- FIBT World Championships in Königssee, Germany:
  - Men: (gold) Martins Dukurs (LAT) 3:23.70 (51.18 / 50.67 / 50.94 / 50.91) (silver) Aleksandr Tretyakov (RUS) 3:25.44 (51.43 / 51.14 / 51.62 / 51.25) (bronze) Frank Rommel (GER) 3:25.68 (51.71 / 51.14 / 51.53 / 51.30)
    - Dukurs wins Latvia's first world skeleton title.
  - Women's standings after 2 of 4 runs: (1) Marion Thees (GER) 1:44.43 (2) Anja Huber (GER) 1:44.58 (3) Mellisa Hollingsworth (CAN) 1:44.98

==== Ski jumping ====
- Nordic World Ski Championships in Oslo, Norway:
  - Women's individual normal hill: (gold) Daniela Iraschko (AUT) 231.7 points (silver) Elena Runggaldier (ITA) 218.9 (bronze) Coline Mattel (FRA) 211.5

=== February 24, 2011 (Thursday) ===
==== Basketball ====
- Euroleague Top 16, matchday 5 (teams in **bold** advance to quarterfinals):
  - Group E: Caja Laboral (Spain) 78–63 (Spain) Unicaja Málaga
    - Standings: (Greece) Panathinaikos Athens, (Lithuania) Lietuvos Rytas, Caja Laboral 3–2; Unicaja Málaga 1–4.
  - Group F: **Maccabi Tel Aviv** (Israel) 85–92 (OT) (Spain) **Regal FC Barcelona**
    - Standings: Regal FC Barcelona 5–0; Maccabi Tel Aviv 3–2; (Italy) Virtus Roma, (Slovenia) Union Olimpija Ljubljana 1–4.
  - Group G:
    - Partizan Belgrade (Serbia) 56–61 (Spain) **Real Madrid**
    - **Montepaschi Siena** (Italy) 88–76 (Turkey) Efes Pilsen Istanbul
      - Standings: Real Madrid 5–0; Montepaschi Siena 3–2; Efes Pilsen 2–3; Partizan Belgrade 0–5.
  - Group H:
    - Žalgiris Kaunas (Lithuania) 74–80 (Spain) Power Electronics Valencia
    - Fenerbahçe Ülker (Turkey) 65–80 (Greece) **Olympiacos Piraeus**
      - Standings: Olympiacos Piraeus 4–1; Fenerbahçe Ülker 3–2; Power Electronics Valencia 2–3; Žalgiris Kaunas 1–4.

==== Cricket ====
- World Cup:
  - Group B: West Indies 222 (47.3 overs); South Africa 223/3 (42.5 overs; AB de Villiers 107*) in New Delhi. **South Africa win by 7 wickets.**

==== Cross-country skiing ====
- Nordic World Ski Championships in Oslo, Norway:
  - Men's sprint: (gold) Marcus Hellner (SWE) 2:57.4 (silver) Petter Northug (NOR) 2:58.0 (bronze) Emil Jönsson (SWE) 2:58.5
    - Hellner becomes the first Swede to win the sprint world title since Thobias Fredriksson in 2003.
  - Women's sprint: (gold) Marit Bjørgen (NOR) 3:03.9 (silver) Arianna Follis (ITA) 3:04.1 (bronze) Petra Majdič (SLO) 3:04.4
    - Bjørgen wins her second world sprint title, and her fifth world title overall.

==== Darts ====
- Premier League, week 3 in Belfast, Northern Ireland:
  - Gary Anderson (SCO) 8–1 Mark Webster (WAL)
  - Simon Whitlock (AUS) 8–5 James Wade (ENG)
  - Adrian Lewis (ENG) 6–8 Raymond van Barneveld (NED)
  - Phil Taylor (ENG) 8–2 Terry Jenkins (ENG)
    - High Checkout: Lewis 170
    - Standings (after 3 matches): Anderson 6 points, van Barneveld, Taylor 4, Lewis, Whitlock, Webster, Wade, Jenkins 2.

==== Football (soccer) ====
- UEFA Europa League Round of 32, second leg (first leg score in parentheses):
  - **Zenit St. Petersburg** (Russia) 3–1 (1–2) (Switzerland) Young Boys. Zenit St. Petersburg win 4–3 on aggregate.
  - Sporting CP (Portugal) 2–2 (1–1) (Scotland) **Rangers**. 3–3 on aggregate; Rangers win on away goals.
  - **Liverpool** (England) 1–0 (0–0) (Czech Republic) Sparta Prague. Liverpool win 1–0 on aggregate.
  - **Spartak Moscow** (Russia) 1–1 (3–2) (Switzerland) Basel. Spartak Moscow win 4–3 on aggregate.
  - **PSV Eindhoven** (Netherlands) 3–1 (2–2) (France) Lille. PSV Eindhoven win 5–3 on aggregate.
  - **Bayer Leverkusen** (Germany) 2–0 (4–0) (Ukraine) Metalist Kharkiv. Bayer Leverkusen win 6–0 on aggregate.
  - **Villarreal** (Spain) 2–1 (0–0) (Italy) Napoli. Villarreal win 2–1 on aggregate.
  - **Ajax** (Netherlands) 2–0 (3–0) (Belgium) Anderlecht. Ajax win 5–0 on aggregate.
  - **Braga** (Portugal) 2–0 (0–1) (Poland) Lech Poznań. Braga win 2–1 on aggregate.
  - **Dynamo Kyiv** (Ukraine) 4–0 (4–1) (Turkey) Beşiktaş. Dynamo Kyiv win 8–1 on aggregate.
  - **Manchester City** (England) 3–0 (0–0) (Greece) Aris. Manchester City win 3–0 on aggregate.
  - **Twente** (Netherlands) 2–2 (2–0) (Russia) Rubin Kazan. Twente win 4–2 on aggregate.
  - Stuttgart (Germany) 0–2 (1–2) (Portugal) **Benfica**. Benfica win 4–1 on aggregate.
  - **Paris Saint-Germain** (France) 0–0 (2–2) (Belarus) BATE. 2–2 on aggregate; Paris Saint-Germain win on away goals.
- Copa Libertadores second stage:
  - Group 2: Junior (Colombia) 2–1 (Brazil) Grêmio
    - Standings (after 2 matches): Junior 6 points, Grêmio, (Peru) León de Huánuco 3, (Bolivia) Oriente Petrolero 0.
  - Group 3: Argentinos Juniors (Argentina) 3–1 (Mexico) América
    - Standings (after 2 matches): Argentinos Juniors 4 points, América 3, (Brazil) Fluminense 2, (Uruguay) Nacional 1.
  - Group 8: Independiente (Argentina) 3–0 (Uruguay) Peñarol
- CONCACAF Champions League quarterfinals, first leg: Saprissa (Costa Rica) 1–0 (Honduras) Olimpia

==== Skeleton ====
- FIBT World Championships in Königssee, Germany:
  - Men's standings after 2 of 4 runs: (1) Martins Dukurs (LAT) 1:41.85 (2) Michi Halilović (GER) 1:42.42 (3) Sandro Stielicke (GER) 1:42.55

=== February 23, 2011 (Wednesday) ===
==== Basketball ====
- Euroleague Top 16, matchday 5 (teams in **bold** advance to quarterfinals):
  - Group E: Panathinaikos Athens (Greece) 67–68 (Lithuania) Lietuvos Rytas
    - Standings: Panathinaikos Athens, Lietuvos Rytas 3–2; (Spain) Caja Laboral 2–2; (Spain) Unicaja Málaga 1–3.
  - Group F: Union Olimpija Ljubljana (Slovenia) 76–87 (Italy) Virtus Roma
    - Standings: (Spain) **Regal FC Barcelona** 4–0; (Israel) **Maccabi Tel Aviv** 3–1; Virtus Roma, Union Olimpija Ljubljana 1–4.

==== Cricket ====
- World Cup:
  - Group A: Pakistan 317/7 (50 overs); Kenya 112 (33.1 overs; Shahid Afridi 5/16) in Hambantota, Sri Lanka. **Pakistan win by 205 runs.**
    - Standings: New Zealand, Sri Lanka, Pakistan, Australia 2 points (1 match), Zimbabwe, Canada 0 (1), Kenya 0 (2).

==== Football (soccer) ====
- CONCACAF U-17 Championship in Montego Bay, Jamaica:
  - Quarterfinals:
    - **Canada** 2–0 Trinidad and Tobago
    - **Jamaica** 2–1 Honduras
- UEFA Champions League Round of 16, first leg:
  - Marseille (France) 0–0 (England) Manchester United
  - Internazionale (Italy) 0–1 (Germany) Bayern Munich
- UEFA Europa League Round of 32, second leg: (first leg score in parentheses)
  - **Porto** (Portugal) 0–1 (2–1) (Spain) Sevilla. 2–2 on aggregate; Porto win on away goals.
- Copa Libertadores second stage:
  - Group 2: León de Huánuco (Peru) 1–0 (Bolivia) Oriente Petrolero
    - Standings: (Brazil) Grêmio, (Colombia) Junior 3 points (1 match), León de Huánuco 3 (2), Oriente Petrolero 0 (2).
  - Group 3: Fluminense (Brazil) 0–0 (Uruguay) Nacional
    - Standings: (Mexico) América 3 points (1 match), Fluminense 2 (2), (Argentina) Argentinos Juniors 1 (1), Nacional 1 (2).
  - Group 6: Internacional (Brazil) 4–0 (Mexico) Jaguares
    - Standings (after 2 matches): Internacional, (Ecuador) Emelec 4 points, Jaguares 3, (Bolivia) Jorge Wilstermann 0.
  - Group 7: Estudiantes (Argentina) 1–0 (Colombia) Deportes Tolima
    - Standings (after 2 matches): (Brazil) Cruzeiro 6 points, Deportes Tolima, Estudiantes 3, (Paraguay) Guaraní 0.
- CONCACAF Champions League quarterfinals, first leg: Toluca (Mexico) 0–1 (Mexico) Monterrey

=== February 22, 2011 (Tuesday) ===
==== Cricket ====
- World Cup:
  - Group B: Netherlands 292/6 (50 overs; Ryan ten Doeschate 119); England 296/4 (48.4 overs) in Nagpur, India. **England win by 6 wickets.**

==== Football (soccer) ====
- CONCACAF U-17 Championship in Montego Bay, Jamaica:
  - Quarterfinals:
    - Costa Rica 0–1 **Panama**
    - **United States** 3–2 (a.e.t.) El Salvador
- African Nations Championship in Sudan:
  - Semi-finals:
    - Algeria 1–1 (3–5 pen.) **Tunisia**
    - Sudan 1–1 (2–4 pen.) **Angola**
- UEFA Champions League Round of 16, first leg:
  - Copenhagen (Denmark) 0–2 (England) Chelsea
  - Lyon (France) 1–1 (Spain) Real Madrid
- UEFA Europa League Round of 32, second leg: (first leg score in parentheses)
  - **CSKA Moscow** (Russia) 1–1 (1–0) (Greece) PAOK. CSKA Moscow win 2–1 on aggregate.
- Copa Libertadores second stage:
  - Group 1:
    - Universidad San Martín (Peru) 2–0 (Mexico) San Luis
    - Once Caldas (Colombia) 1–1 (Paraguay) Libertad
      - Standings (after 2 matches): Universidad San Martín 6 points, Libertad 4, Once Caldas 1, San Luis 0.
  - Group 6: Emelec (Ecuador) 1–0 (Bolivia) Jorge Wilstermann
    - Standings: Emelec 4 points (2 matches), (Mexico) Jaguares 3 (1), (Brazil) Internacional 1 (1), Jorge Wilstermann 0 (2).
  - Group 7: Cruzeiro (Brazil) 4–0 (Paraguay) Guaraní
    - Standings: Cruzeiro 6 points (2 matches), (Colombia) Deportes Tolima 3 (1), (Argentina) Estudiantes 0 (1), Guaraní 0 (2).
- CONCACAF Champions League quarterfinals, first leg:
  - Columbus Crew (United States) 0–0 (United States) Real Salt Lake
  - Cruz Azul (Mexico) 2–0 (Mexico) Santos Laguna

=== February 21, 2011 (Monday) ===
==== Cricket ====
- World Cup:
  - Group A: Australia 262/6 (50 overs); Zimbabwe 171 (46.2 overs) in Ahmedabad, India. **Australia win by 91 runs.**

==== Football (soccer) ====
- OFC Champions League Group stage, matchday 4:
  - Group B: AS Magenta (New Caledonia) 0–1 (New Zealand) Auckland City
    - Standings (after 4 matches): Auckland City 8 points, (New Zealand) Waitakere United 5, (French Polynesia) AS Tefana, AS Magenta 4.

=== February 20, 2011 (Sunday) ===
==== Alpine skiing ====
- World Championships in Garmisch-Partenkirchen, Germany:
  - Men's slalom: (gold) Jean-Baptiste Grange (FRA) 1:41.72 (51.30 / 50.42) (silver) Jens Byggmark (SWE) 1:42.15 (52.39 / 49.76) (bronze) Manfred Mölgg (ITA) 1:42.33 (51.52 / 50.81)
    - Grange becomes France's first male world champion since Michel Vion won the combined title in 1982.

==== Auto racing ====
- Sprint Cup Series:
  - Daytona 500 in Daytona Beach, Florida: (1) (Tennessee) Trevor Bayne (Ford; Wood Brothers Racing) (2) (Missouri) Carl Edwards (Ford; Roush Fenway Racing) (3) (California) David Gilliland (Ford; Front Row Motorsports)
    - Bayne wins in only his second Sprint Cup start, and ties Jamie McMurray's modern-era record from 2002. Bayne also becomes the youngest winner of the race, and the second-youngest winner in Sprint Cup history, at the age of 20 years, 1 day.

==== Badminton ====
- European Mixed Team Championships in Amsterdam, Netherlands:
  - Final: (gold) **Denmark** 3–1 (silver) Germany
    - Denmark win their ninth successive title, and 14th overall.

==== Basketball ====
- NBA All-Star Game in Los Angeles:
  - West 148, East 143
    - Kobe Bryant, who scores a game-high 37 points, is named MVP for the fourth time and ties the record of Bob Pettit.

==== Bobsleigh ====
- FIBT World Championships in Königssee, Germany:
  - Two-man: (gold) Alexandr Zubkov/Alexey Voyevoda (RUS) 3:20.72 (50.31 / 50.25 / 50.20 / 49.96) (silver) Thomas Florschütz/Kevin Kuske (GER) 3:20.90 (50.50 / 50.17 / 50.29 / 49.94) (silver) Manuel Machata/Andreas Bredau (GER) 3:20.90 (50.51 / 50.26 / 50.24 / 49.89)
    - Zubkov and Voyevoda become the first Russians to win a world title.
  - Mixed team: (gold) Germany II (Michi Halilović, Sandra Kiriasis/Stephanie Schneider, Marion Thees, Francesco Friedrich/Florian Becke) 3:26.09 (51.40 / 51.60 / 52.82 / 50.27) (silver) Germany I (Frank Rommel, Cathleen Martini/Kristin Steinert, Anja Huber, Karl Angerer/Alex Mann) 3:26.15 (51.52 / 51.50 / 52.74 / 50.39) (bronze) Canada I (Jon Montgomery, Kaillie Humphries/Heather Moyse, Mellisa Hollingsworth, Lyndon Rush/Neville Wright) 3:26.96 (51.54 / 51.40 / 53.67 / 50.35)
    - Germany win the event for the fourth successive time.

==== Cricket ====
- World Cup:
  - Group A:
    - Kenya 69 (23.5 overs); New Zealand 72/0 (8 overs) in Chennai, India. **New Zealand win by 10 wickets.**
    - Sri Lanka 332/7 (50 overs; Mahela Jayawardene 100); Canada 122 (36.5 overs) in Hambantota, Sri Lanka. **Sri Lanka win by 210 runs.**

==== Cross-country skiing ====
- World Cup in Drammen, Norway:
  - Men's sprint freestyle: (gold) Emil Jönsson (SWE) 3:04.8 (silver) Alex Harvey (CAN) 3:05.4 (bronze) Petter Northug (NOR) 3:05.7
    - Sprint standings (after 9 of 11 races): (1) Jönsson 430 points (2) Ola Vigen Hattestad (NOR) 344 (3) Alexei Petukhov (RUS) 277
    - Overall standings (after 25 of 31 races): (1) Dario Cologna (SUI) 1247 points (2) Northug 894 (3) Daniel Richardsson (SWE) 781
  - Women's sprint freestyle: (gold) Kikkan Randall (USA) 2:17.2 (silver) Maiken Caspersen Falla (NOR) 2:17.5 (bronze) Charlotte Kalla (SWE) 2:17.8
    - Sprint standings (after 9 of 11 races): (1) Randall 391 points (2) Arianna Follis (ITA) 383 (3) Petra Majdič (SLO) 370
    - Overall standings (after 25 of 31 races): (1) Justyna Kowalczyk (POL) 1659 points (2) Marit Bjørgen (NOR) 1067 (3) Follis 1025

==== Equestrianism ====
- Dressage:
  - FEI World Cup Western European League:
    - 8th competition in Neumünster (CDI-W): (gold) Ulla Salzgeber (GER) on Herzruf's Erbe (silver) Isabell Werth (GER) on Satchmo (bronze) Helen Langehanenberg (GER) on Damon Hill NRW
      - Standings (after 8 of 10 competitions): (1) Salzgeber 77 points (2) Werth 74 (3) Adelinde Cornelissen (NED) 63

==== Figure skating ====
- Four Continents Championships in Taipei, Chinese Taipei:
  - Ladies: (gold) Miki Ando (JPN) 201.34 points (silver) Mao Asada (JPN) 196.30 (bronze) Mirai Nagasu (USA) 189.46
    - Ando wins the title for the first time.

==== Golf ====
- PGA Tour:
  - Northern Trust Open in Pacific Palisades, California:
    - Winner: Aaron Baddeley (AUS) 272 (−12)
      - Baddeley wins his third PGA Tour title, and first for four years.
- European Tour:
  - Avantha Masters in New Delhi, India:
    - Winner: Shiv Chowrasia (IND) 273 (−15)
      - Chowrasia wins his second European Tour title.
- LPGA Tour:
  - Honda LPGA Thailand in Chonburi:
    - Winner: Yani Tseng (TPE) 273 (−15)
      - Tseng wins her sixth LPGA Tour title.
- Champions Tour:
  - The ACE Group Classic in Naples, Florida:
    - Winner: Bernhard Langer (GER) 196 (−20)
      - Langer wins his 14th Champions Tour title.

==== Ice hockey ====
- NHL Heritage Classic in Calgary, Alberta:
  - Calgary Flames 4, Montreal Canadiens 0
    - The Flames' Miikka Kiprusoff becomes the first goaltender to record a shutout in an outdoor NHL game, making 39 saves.

==== Luge ====
- World Cup in Sigulda, Latvia:
  - Women's: (gold) Tatjana Hüfner (GER) 1:24.679 (42.405 / 42.274) (silver) Tatiana Ivanova (RUS) 1:24.692 (42.354 / 42.338) (bronze) Anke Wischnewski (GER) 1:25.187 (42.659 / 42.528)
    - Hüfner wins her seventh race of the season, and ties her own record from 2007–08.
    - Final standings: (1) Hüfner 845 points (2) Natalie Geisenberger (GER) 680 (3) Wischnewski 605
      - Hüfner wins her fourth consecutive World Cup title.
  - Team relay: (gold) Russia (Tatiana Ivanova, Albert Demtschenko, Vladislav Yuzhakov/Vladimir Makhnutin) 2:15.660 (43.915 / 45.668 / 46.077) (silver) Italy (Sandra Gasparini, Armin Zöggeler, Christian Oberstolz/Patrick Gruber) 2:16.417 (44.736 / 45.633 / 46.048) (bronze) Germany (Tatjana Hüfner, Jan-Armin Eichhorn, Toni Eggert/Sascha Benecken) 2:16.626 (43.764 / 45.969 / 46.893)
    - Final standings: (1) Germany 570 points (2) Italy 440 (3) Russia 426
      - Germany win their fifth consecutive title.

==== Short-track speed skating ====
- World Cup 6 in Dresden, Germany:
  - Men:
    - 500 m: (gold) Simon Cho (USA) 41.070 (silver) Liang Wenhao (CHN) 41.196 (bronze) Thibaut Fauconnet (FRA) 41.250
      - Final standings: (1) Cho 3978 points (2) Fauconnet 3275 (3) Liang 2550
    - 1000 m: (gold) Song Weilong (CHN) 1:25.553 (silver) Guillaume Bastille (CAN) 1:26.733 (bronze) Noh Jin-kyu (KOR) 1:34.773
      - Final standings: (1) Fauconnet 4220 points (2) Noh 3152 (3) Travis Jayner (USA) 2411
    - 5000 m relay: (gold) Germany (Robert Becker, Paul Herrmann, Torsten Kroeger, Robert Seifert) 6:44.466 (silver) South Korea (Kim Byeong-jun, Lee Ho-suk, Noh, Um Cheon-ho) 6:47.676 (bronze) Canada (Remi Beaulieu, Guillaume Blais Dufour, Michael Gilday, Olivier Jean) 6:47.687
      - Final standings: (1) Canada 3800 points (2) South Korea 2850 (3) Netherlands 2460
  - Women:
    - 500 m: (gold) Marianne St-Gelais (CAN) 43.091 (silver) Martina Valcepina (ITA) 43.235 (bronze) Liu Qiuhong (CHN) 43.275
      - Final standings: (1) St-Gelais 5000 points (2) Liu 4250 (3) Zhao Nannan (CHN) 3840
    - 1000 m: (gold) Yang Shin-young (KOR) 1:30.659 (silver) Yui Sakai (JPN) 1:30.741 (bronze) Marie-Ève Drolet (CAN) 1:30.852
      - Final standings: (1) Katherine Reutter (USA) 3136 points (2) Yang 3000 (3) Zhou Yang (CHN) 2440
    - 3000 m relay: (gold) United States (Lana Gehring, Reutter, Emily Scott, Jessica Smith) 4:12.939 (silver) South Korea (Park Seung-hi, Yang, Cho Ha-ri, Hwang Hyun-sun) 4:13.037 (bronze) Canada (Drolet, Jessica Hewitt, Valérie Maltais, St-Gelais) 4:13.124
      - Final standings: (1) China 4000 points (2) Canada 2880 (3) United States 2850

==== Skeleton ====
- FIBT World Championships in Königssee, Germany:
  - Mixed team: (gold) Germany II (Michi Halilović, Sandra Kiriasis/Stephanie Schneider, Marion Thees, Francesco Friedrich/Florian Becke) 3:26.09 (51.40 / 51.60 / 52.82 / 50.27) (silver) Germany I (Frank Rommel, Cathleen Martini/Kristin Steinert, Anja Huber, Karl Angerer/Alex Mann) 3:26.15 (51.52 / 51.50 / 52.74 / 50.39) (bronze) Canada I (Jon Montgomery, Kaillie Humphries/Heather Moyse, Mellisa Hollingsworth, Lyndon Rush/Neville Wright) 3:26.96 (51.54 / 51.40 / 53.67 / 50.35)
    - Germany win the event for the fourth successive time.

==== Snooker ====
- Welsh Open in Newport, Wales:
  - Final: **John Higgins** (SCO) 9–6 Stephen Maguire (SCO)
    - In the first All-Scottish final since the 2005 Malta Cup between Stephen Hendry and Graeme Dott, Higgins defends his title, winning the tournament for the third time and wins his 23rd ranking title.

==== Snowboarding ====
- World Cup in Stoneham, Canada:
  - Men's parallel Giant slalom: (gold) Benjamin Karl (AUT) (silver) Andreas Prommegger (AUT) (bronze) Matthew Morison (CAN)
    - Parallel slalom standings (after 7 of 10 races): (1) Karl 4760 points (2) Prommegger 3700 (3) Roland Fischnaller (ITA) 3400
    - Overall standings: (1) Karl 4760 points (2) Prommegger 3700 (3) Fischnaller 3400
  - Women's parallel Giant slalom: (gold) Yekaterina Tudegesheva (RUS) (silver) Claudia Riegler (AUT) (bronze) Marion Kreiner (AUT)
    - Parallel slalom standings (after 7 of 10 races): (1) Tudegesheva 4890 points (2) Fränzi Mägert-Kohli (SUI) 3910 (3) Kreiner 3240
    - Overall standings: (1) Tudegesheva 4890 points (2) Mägert-Kohli 3910 (3) Kreiner 3240

==== Tennis ====
- ATP World Tour:
  - Open 13 in Marseille, France:
    - Final: **Robin Söderling** (SWE) def. Marin Čilić (CRO) 6–7(8), 6–3, 6–3
      - Söderling wins a tournament for the second successive week, and his third title of the year and ninth of his career.
  - Copa Claro in Buenos Aires, Argentina:
    - Final: **Nicolás Almagro** (ESP) def. Juan Ignacio Chela (ARG) 6–3, 3–6, 6–4
      - Almagro wins a tournament for the second successive week, and his second title of the year and ninth of his career.
  - Regions Morgan Keegan Championships in Memphis, United States:
    - Final: **Andy Roddick** (USA) def. Milos Raonic (CAN) 7–6(7), 6–7(11), 7–5
      - Roddick wins the tournament for the third time, and his 30th career title.
- WTA Tour:
  - Dubai Tennis Championships in Dubai, United Arab Emirates:
    - Final: **Caroline Wozniacki** (DEN) def. Svetlana Kuznetsova (RUS) 6–1, 6–3
      - Wozniacki wins her 13th career title and regains the World number one ranking, seven days after Kim Clijsters (BEL) took the spot.
  - Copa BBVA-Colsanitas in Bogotá, Colombia:
    - Final: **Lourdes Domínguez Lino** (ESP) def. Mathilde Johansson (FRA) 2–6, 6–3, 6–2
      - Domínguez Lino wins her second career title.

=== February 19, 2011 (Saturday) ===
==== Alpine skiing ====
- World Championships in Garmisch-Partenkirchen, Germany:
  - Women's slalom: (gold) Marlies Schild (AUT) 1:45.79 (52.69 / 53.10) (silver) Kathrin Zettel (AUT) 1:46.13 (53.30 / 52.83) (bronze) Maria Pietilä Holmner (SWE) 1:46.44 (53.48 / 52.96)
    - Schild wins Austria's fourth title of the championships and the first gold medal in women's slalom since Karin Buder in 1993.

==== Auto racing ====
- Nationwide Series:
  - DRIVE4COPD 300 in Daytona Beach, Florida: (1) (Indiana) Tony Stewart (Chevrolet; Kevin Harvick Incorporated) (2) (Kansas) Clint Bowyer (Chevrolet; Kevin Harvick Incorporated) (3) (Iowa) Landon Cassill (Chevrolet; Phoenix Racing)
    - Stewart wins the race for the sixth time in seven years.

==== Badminton ====
- European Mixed Team Championships in Amsterdam, Netherlands:
  - Semifinals:
    - **Denmark** 3–1 England
    - Russia 1–3 **Germany**

==== Basketball ====
- ASEAN Basketball League finals, game 2:
  - AirAsia Philippine Patriots (Philippines) 68–75 Chang Thailand Slammers. **Chang Thailand Slammers win best-of-3 series 2–0.**

==== Bobsleigh ====
- FIBT World Championships in Königssee, Germany:
  - Two-woman: (gold) Cathleen Martini/Romy Logsch (GER) 3:26.11 (51.36 / 51.41 / 51.69 / 51.65) (silver) Shauna Rohbock/Valerie Fleming (USA) 3:26.33 (51.44 / 51.44 / 51.85 / 51.60) (bronze) Kaillie Humphries/Heather Moyse (CAN) 3:26.74 (51.36 / 51.59 / 52.01 / 51.78)
    - Martini wins her first world title, and Logsch wins her third.
  - Two-man standings after 2 of 4 runs: (1) Alexandr Zubkov/Alexey Voyevoda (RUS) 1:40.56 (2) Beat Hefti/Thomas Lamparter (SUI) 1:40.62 (3) Thomas Florschütz/Kevin Kuske (GER) 1:40.67

==== Cricket ====
- World Cup:
  - Group B: India 370/4 (50 overs; Virender Sehwag 175, Virat Kohli 100*); Bangladesh 283/9 (50 overs) in Mirpur, Dhaka. **India win by 87 runs.**

==== Cross-country skiing ====
- World Cup in Drammen, Norway:
  - Men's 15 km C: (gold) Daniel Richardsson (SWE) 37:19.1 (silver) Martin Johnsrud Sundby (NOR) 37:48.1 (bronze) Petter Northug (NOR) 37:49.1
    - Distance standings (after 14 of 17 races): (1) Dario Cologna (SUI) 531 points (2) Alexander Legkov (RUS) 471 (3) Richardsson 466
    - Overall standings (after 24 of 31 races): (1) Cologna 1247 points (2) Northug 834 (3) Richardsson 781
  - Women's 10 km C: (gold) Marit Bjørgen (NOR) 27:31.9 (silver) Justyna Kowalczyk (POL) 27:49.2 (bronze) Aino-Kaisa Saarinen (FIN) 27:55.5
    - Distance standings (after 14 of 17 races): (1) Kowalczyk 867 points (2) Bjørgen 610 (3) Marianna Longa (ITA) 481
    - Overall standings (after 24 of 31 races): (1) Kowalczyk 1656 points (2) Bjørgen 1022 (3) Arianna Follis (ITA) 975

==== Figure skating ====
- Four Continents Championships in Taipei, Chinese Taipei:
  - Ladies short program: (1) Miki Ando (JPN) 66.58 (2) Mao Asada (JPN) 63.41 (3) Rachael Flatt (USA) 62.23
  - Men: (gold) Daisuke Takahashi (JPN) 244.00 (silver) Yuzuru Hanyu (JPN) 228.01 (bronze) Jeremy Abbott (USA) 225.71
    - Takahashi wins the title for the second time in three years.

==== Football (soccer) ====
- CONCACAF U-17 Championship in Montego Bay, Jamaica: (teams in **bold** advance to the quarter-finals)
  - Group C: **Jamaica** 1–0 Guatemala
    - Final standings: Jamaica, **Trinidad and Tobago** 4 points, Guatemala 0.
  - Group D: **Honduras** 0–0 **Canada**
    - Final standings: Canada, Honduras 4 points, Barbados 0.
- African Nations Championship in Sudan:
  - Quarter-finals:
    - Cameroon 0–0 (8–9 pen.) **Angola**
    - **Tunisia** 1–0 DR Congo

==== Freestyle skiing ====
- World Cup in Minsk, Belarus:
  - Men's Aerials: (gold) Anton Kushnir (BLR) 256.31 points (silver) Stanislav Kravchuk (UKR) 244.49 (bronze) Denis Osipau (BLR) 237.42
    - Final aerials standings: (1) Qi Guangpu (CHN) 461 points (2) Kushnir 428 (3) Renato Ulrich (SUI) 321
      - Qi wins his first aerials World Cup title.
    - Overall standings: (1) Guilbaut Colas (FRA) 77 points (2) Andreas Matt (AUT) 71 (3) Qi 66
  - Women's Aerials: (gold) Cheng Shuang (CHN) 187.87 points (silver) Ashley Caldwell (USA) 183.96 (bronze) Kong Fanyu (CHN) 178.28
    - Final aerials standings: (1) Cheng 442 points (2) Xu Mengtao (CHN) 420 (3) Olha Volkova (UKR) 343
      - Cheng wins her first aerials World Cup title.
    - Overall standings: (1) Hannah Kearney (USA) 87 points (2) Cheng 63 (3) Xu 60

==== Luge ====
- World Cup in Sigulda, Latvia:
  - Men's: (gold) Armin Zöggeler (ITA) 1:36.998 (48.490 / 48.508) (silver) Albert Demtschenko (RUS) 1:37.289 (48.584 / 48.705) (bronze) Mārtiņš Rubenis (LAT) 1:37.465 (48.681 / 48.784)
    - Final standings: (1) Zöggeler 765 points (2) Felix Loch (GER) 658 (3) Demtschenko 514
      - Zöggeler wins his sixth successive World Cup title, and his tenth overall, tying the record of Markus Prock (AUT).
  - Doubles: (gold) Andreas Linger/Wolfgang Linger (AUT) 1:24.209 (42.209 / 42.000) (silver) Christian Oberstolz/Patrick Gruber (ITA) 1:24.637 (42.387 / 42.250) (bronze) Toni Eggert/Sascha Benecken (GER) 1:24.712 (42.367 / 42.345)
    - Final standings: (1) Tobias Wendl/Tobias Arlt (GER) 746 points (2) Linger/Linger 692 (3) Oberstolz/Gruber 671
      - Wendl/Arlt win their first World Cup title.

==== Short-track speed skating ====
- World Cup 6 in Dresden, Germany:
  - Men:
    - 500 m: (gold) Thibaut Fauconnet (FRA) 41.392 (silver) Simon Cho (USA) 41.406 (bronze) Travis Jayner (USA) 42.834
      - Standings (after 7 of 8 races): (1) Cho 2978 points (2) Fauconnet 2635 (3) Han Jialiang (CHN) 2134
    - 1500 m: (gold) Liu Xianwei (CHN) 2:16.962 (silver) Lee Ho-Suk (KOR) 2:17.176 (bronze) Michael Gilday (CAN) 2:17.378
      - Final standings: (1) Maxime Chataignier (FRA) 2405 points (2) Liu 2358 (3) Gilday 2306
  - Women:
    - 500 m: (gold) Marianne St-Gelais (CAN) 43.237 (silver) Liu Qiuhong (CHN) 43.414 (bronze) Martina Valcepina (ITA) 44.252
      - Standings (after 7 of 8 races): (1) Liu 4020 points (2) St-Gelais 4000 (3) Zhao Nannan (CHN) 3840
    - 1500 m: (gold) Yang Shin-young (KOR) 2:21.724 (silver) Marie-Ève Drolet (CAN) 2:21.813 (bronze) Hwang Hyunsun (KOR) 2:24.917
      - Final standings: (1) Katherine Reutter (USA) 4210 points (2) Zhou Yang (CHN) 3490 (3) Cho Ha-Ri (KOR) 2600

==== Snooker ====
- Welsh Open in Newport, Wales, semi-finals:
  - **John Higgins** (SCO) 6–2 Ali Carter (ENG)
  - **Stephen Maguire** (SCO) 6–5 Mark Selby (ENG)

==== Snowboarding ====
- World Cup in Stoneham, Canada:
  - Big Air: (gold) Sebastien Toutant (CAN) 56.5 points (silver) Matts Kulisek (CAN) 51.0 (bronze) Stefan Falkeis (AUT) 50.6
    - Final Big Air standings: (1) Toutant 2220 points (2) Falkeis 1500 (3) Clemens Schattschneider (AUT) 1360

==== Speed skating ====
- World Cup 7 in Kearns, Utah, United States:
  - 1500m women: (gold) Marrit Leenstra (NED) 1:53.38 (silver) Ireen Wüst (NED) 1:53.75 (bronze) Christine Nesbitt (CAN) 1:54.16
    - Standings (after 5 of 6 races): (1) Nesbitt 470 points (2) Leenstra 346 (3) Wüst 310
  - 10000m men: (gold) Bob de Jong (NED) 12:53.17 (silver) Lee Seung-Hoon (KOR) 12:57.27 (bronze) Bob de Vries (NED) 13:01.83
    - Standings (after 5 of 6 races): (1) de Jong 460 points (2) Håvard Bøkko (NOR) 286 (3) Ivan Skobrev (RUS) 280

==== Tennis ====
- WTA Tour:
  - Cellular South Cup in Memphis, United States:
    - Final: **Magdaléna Rybáriková** (SVK) def. Rebecca Marino (CAN) 6–2 retired
      - Marino retires from her first WTA Tour final due to an abdominal injury, giving Rybáriková her second WTA Tour title.

=== February 18, 2011 (Friday) ===
==== Alpine skiing ====
- World Championships in Garmisch-Partenkirchen, Germany:
  - Men's giant slalom: (gold) Ted Ligety (USA) 2:10.56 (1:02.33 / 1:08.23) (silver) Cyprien Richard (FRA) 2:10.64 (1:02.79 / 1:07.85) (bronze) Philipp Schörghofer (AUT) 2:10.99 (1:02.13 / 1:08.86)
    - Ligety wins the United States' first men's alpine skiing world title since Bode Miller in Downhill and Super-G in 2005.

==== Badminton ====
- European Mixed Team Championships in Amsterdam, Netherlands:
  - Quarterfinals:
    - **Denmark** 3–0 Poland
    - **England** 3–1 Bulgaria
    - Netherlands 0–3 **Russia**
    - France 0–3 **Germany**

==== Bobsleigh ====
- FIBT World Championships in Königssee, Germany:
  - Two-woman standings after 2 of 4 runs: (1) Cathleen Martini/Romy Logsch (GER) 1:42.77 (2) Shauna Rohbock/Valerie Fleming (USA) 1:42.88 (3) Kaillie Humphries/Heather Moyse (CAN) 1:42.95

==== Figure skating ====
- Four Continents Championships in Taipei, Chinese Taipei:
  - Men short program: (1) Daisuke Takahashi (JPN) 83.49 points (2) Jeremy Abbott (USA) 76.73 (3) Yuzuru Hanyu (JPN) 76.43
  - Pairs: (gold) Pang Qing/Tong Jian (CHN) 199.45 points (silver) Meagan Duhamel/Eric Radford (CAN) 181.79 (bronze) Paige Lawrence/Rudi Swiegers (CAN) 171.73
    - Pang/Tong win the title for the fifth time.
  - Ice dancing: (gold) Meryl Davis/Charlie White (USA) 172.03 points (silver) Maia Shibutani/Alex Shibutani (USA) 155.38 (bronze) Vanessa Crone/Paul Poirier (CAN) 151.83
    - Davis/White win the title for the second time in three years.
    - World and Olympic champions Tessa Virtue/Scott Moir (CAN) withdrew during the free dance after placing first in short dance.

==== Football (soccer) ====
- CONCACAF U-17 Championship in Montego Bay, Jamaica: (teams in **bold** advance to the quarter-finals)
  - Group A: **Costa Rica** 3–2 **El Salvador**
    - Final standings: Costa Rica 6 points, El Salvador 3, Haiti 0.
  - Group B: **United States** 1–0 **Panama**
    - Final standings: United States 6 points, Panama, Cuba 1.
- African Nations Championship in Sudan:
  - Quarter-finals:
    - South Africa 0–2 **Algeria**
    - **Sudan** 1–1 (4–3 pen.) Niger

==== Snooker ====
- Welsh Open in Newport, Wales, quarter-finals:
  - Mark Williams (WAL) 3–5 **Stephen Maguire** (SCO)
  - **Mark Selby** (ENG) 5–3 Graeme Dott (SCO)
  - **John Higgins** (SCO) 5–3 Matthew Stevens (WAL)
  - **Ali Carter** (ENG) 5–2 Ding Junhui (CHN)

==== Snowboarding ====
- World Cup in Stoneham, Canada:
  - Men's halfpipe: (gold) Ryō Aono (JPN) (silver) Taku Hiraoka (JPN) (bronze) Fujita Kazuumi (JPN)
    - Halfpipe standings (after 3 of 6 events): (1) Aono 1800 points (2) Nathan Johnstone (AUS) 1260 (3) Tore Viken Holvik (NOR) 1000
  - Women's halfpipe: (gold) Cai Xuetong (CHN) (silver) Holly Crawford (USA) (bronze) Haruna Matsumoto (JPN)

==== Speed skating ====
- World Cup 7 in Kearns, Utah, United States:
  - 1500m men: (gold) Trevor Marsicano (USA) 1:43.35 (silver) Shani Davis (USA) 1:43.38 (bronze) Mark Tuitert (NED) 1:43.54
    - Standings (after 5 of 6 races): (1) Marsicano 301 points (2) Davis 290 (3) Simon Kuipers (NED) 285
  - 5000m women: (gold) Martina Sáblíková (CZE) 6:42.66 (WR) (silver) Stephanie Beckert (GER) 6:47.03 (bronze) Eriko Ishino (JPN) 6:55.07
    - Standings (after 5 of 6 races): (1) Sáblíková 360 points (2) Beckert 355 (3) Jilleanne Rookard (USA) 276

=== February 17, 2011 (Thursday) ===
==== Alpine skiing ====
- World Championships in Garmisch-Partenkirchen, Germany:
  - Women's giant slalom: (gold) Tina Maze (SLO) 2:20.54 (1:07.05 / 1:13.49) (silver) Federica Brignone (ITA) 2:20.63 (1:07.39 / 1:13.24) (bronze) Tessa Worley (FRA) 2:21.02 (1:09.17 / 1:11.85)
    - Maze becomes the first Slovenian alpine skier to win a world title.

==== Auto racing ====
- Sprint Cup Series:
  - Gatorade Duels in Daytona Beach, Florida:
    - Duel 1: (1) (Nevada) Kurt Busch (Dodge; Penske Racing) (2) (New York (state)) Regan Smith (Chevrolet; Furniture Row Racing) (3) (California) Kevin Harvick (Chevrolet; Richard Childress Racing)
    - Duel 2: (1) (Virginia) Jeff Burton (Chevrolet; Richard Childress Racing) (2) (Kansas) Clint Bowyer (Chevrolet; Richard Childress Racing) (3) (Kentucky) Michael Waltrip (Toyota; Michael Waltrip Racing)

==== Basketball ====
- Euroleague Top 16, matchday 4: (teams in **bold** advance to quarterfinals, teams in ~~strike~~ are eliminated)
  - Group E:
    - Panathinaikos Athens (Greece) 76–74 (Spain) Caja Laboral
    - Lietuvos Rytas (Lithuania) 70–65 (Spain) Unicaja Málaga
      - Standings (after 4 games): Panathinaikos Athens 3–1; Lietuvos Rytas, Caja Laboral 2–2; Unicaja Málaga 1–3.
  - Group F:
    - ~~Virtus Roma~~ (Italy) 65–74 (Spain) **Regal FC Barcelona**
    - ~~Union Olimpija Ljubljana~~ (Slovenia) 65–83 (Israel) **Maccabi Tel Aviv**
      - Standings (after 4 games): Regal FC Barcelona 4–0; Maccabi Tel Aviv 3–1; Union Olimpija Ljubljana 1–3; Virtus Roma 0–4.
  - Group G: (Turkey) Efes Pilsen Istanbul 60–77 (Spain) **Real Madrid**
    - Standings (after 4 games): Real Madrid 4–0; (Italy) Montepaschi Siena, Efes Pilsen Istanbul 2–2; (Serbia) ~~Partizan Belgrade~~ 0–4.
  - Group H: Power Electronics Valencia (Spain) 79–85 (Greece) Olympiacos Piraeus
    - Standings (after 4 games): (Turkey) Fenerbahçe Ülker, Olympiacos Piraeus 3–1; Power Electronics Valencia, (Lithuania) Žalgiris Kaunas 1–3.

==== Darts ====
- Premier League, week 2 in Nottingham, England:
  - Simon Whitlock (AUS) 3–8 Raymond van Barneveld (NED)
  - James Wade (ENG) 8–6 Adrian Lewis (ENG)
  - Phil Taylor (ENG) 8–5 Mark Webster (WAL)
  - Terry Jenkins (ENG) 4–8 Gary Anderson (SCO)
    - High Checkout: Webster 170
    - Standings (after 2 matches): Anderson 4 points, Lewis, van Barneveld, Webster, Jenkins, Wade, Taylor 2, Whitlock 0.

==== Figure skating ====
- Four Continents Championships in Taipei, Chinese Taipei:
  - Short dance: (1) Tessa Virtue/Scott Moir (CAN) 69.40 points (2) Meryl Davis/Charlie White (USA) 69.01 (3) Kaitlyn Weaver/Andrew Poje (CAN) 65.45
  - Pairs short program: (1) Pang Qing/Tong Jian (CHN) 71.41 points (2) Paige Lawrence/Rudi Swiegers (CAN) 59.98 (3) Meagan Duhamel/Eric Radford (CAN) 59.92

==== Football (soccer) ====
- CONCACAF U-17 Championship in Montego Bay, Jamaica: (teams in **bold** advance to the quarter-finals, team in ~~strike~~ is eliminated)
  - Group C: Guatemala 0–1 **Trinidad and Tobago**
    - Standings: Trinidad and Tobago 4 points (2 matches), Jamaica 1 (1), Guatemala 0 (1).
  - Group D: **Canada** 8–0 ~~Barbados~~
    - Standings: Canada, **Honduras** 3 points (1 match), Barbados 0 (2).
- UEFA Europa League Round of 32, first leg:
  - Rubin Kazan (Russia) 0–2 (Netherlands) Twente
  - Metalist Kharkiv (Ukraine) 0–4 (Germany) Bayer Leverkusen
  - Napoli (Italy) 0–0 (Spain) Villarreal
  - Anderlecht (Belgium) 0–3 (Netherlands) Ajax
  - Lech Poznań (Poland) 1–0 (Portugal) Braga
  - Beşiktaş (Turkey) 1–4 (Ukraine) Dynamo Kyiv
  - Benfica (Portugal) 2–1 (Germany) Stuttgart
  - BATE (Belarus) 2–2 (France) Paris Saint-Germain
  - Rangers (Scotland) 1–1 (Portugal) Sporting CP
  - Sparta Prague (Czech Republic) 0–0 (England) Liverpool
  - Basel (Switzerland) 2–3 (Russia) Spartak Moscow
  - Young Boys (Switzerland) 2–1 (Russia) Zenit St. Petersburg
  - PAOK (Greece) 0–1 (Russia) CSKA Moscow
  - Sevilla (Spain) 1–2 (Portugal) Porto
  - Lille (France) 2–2 (Netherlands) PSV Eindhoven
- Copa Libertadores second stage:
  - Group 2:
    - León de Huánuco (Peru) 1–2 (Colombia) Junior
    - Grêmio (Brazil) 3–0 (Bolivia) Oriente Petrolero
  - Group 5: Cerro Porteño (Paraguay) 5–2 (Chile) Colo-Colo
  - Group 8: Godoy Cruz (Argentina) 2–1 (Ecuador) LDU Quito

==== Snooker ====
- Welsh Open in Newport, Wales, last 16:
  - **Mark Williams** (WAL) 4–0 Jamie Cope (ENG)
  - **Ali Carter** (ENG) 4–1 Peter Ebdon (ENG)
  - Ryan Day (WAL) 3–4 **Matthew Stevens** (WAL)
  - Mark Allen (NIR) 3–4 **Ding Junhui** (CHN)
  - **Graeme Dott** (SCO) 4–1 Neil Robertson (AUS)
  - Stephen Hendry (SCO) 2–4 **Stephen Maguire** (SCO)
    - Hendry compiles the 10th maximum break of his career and now shares the record with Ronnie O'Sullivan, and becomes the oldest player to compile it at the age of 42 years and 35 days.

==== Snowboarding ====
- World Cup in Stoneham, Canada:
  - Men's Snowboard Cross: (gold) Nick Baumgartner (USA) (silver) Jonathan Cheever (USA) (bronze) David Speiser (GER)
    - Snowboard Cross standings (after 4 of 6 races): (1) Alex Pullin (AUS) 1770 points (2) Cheever 1690 (3) Pierre Vaultier (FRA) 1590
    - Overall standings: (1) Benjamin Karl (AUT) 3910 points (2) Roland Fischnaller (ITA) 3120 (3) Andreas Prommegger (AUT) 3100
  - Women's Snowboard Cross: (gold) Lindsey Jacobellis (USA) (silver) Dominique Maltais (CAN) (bronze) Déborah Anthonioz (FRA)
    - Snowboard Cross standings (after 4 of 6 races): (1) Maltais 3800 points (2) Maëlle Ricker (CAN) 2200 (3) Aleksandra Zhekova (BUL) 1960
    - Overall standings: (1) Yekaterina Tudegesheva (RUS) 4180 points (2) Fränzi Mägert-Kohli (SUI) 3910 (3) Maltais 3800

=== February 16, 2011 (Wednesday) ===
==== Alpine skiing ====
- World Championships in Garmisch-Partenkirchen, Germany:
  - Nations team event: (gold) France (Tessa Worley, Taïna Barioz, Anemone Marmottan, Cyprien Richard, Gauthier de Tessières, Thomas Fanara) (silver) Austria (Anna Fenninger, Michaela Kirchgasser, Marlies Schild, Romed Baumann, Benjamin Raich, Philipp Schörghofer) (bronze) Sweden (Sara Hector, Anja Pärson, Maria Pietilä Holmner, Axel Bäck, Hans Olsson, Matts Olsson)
    - France become the third different country to win the team event since its début in 2005.

==== Basketball ====
- Euroleague Top 16, matchday 4:
  - Group G: Montepaschi Siena (Italy) 77–74 (Serbia) Partizan Belgrade
    - Standings: (Spain) Real Madrid 3–0; (Turkey) Efes Pilsen Istanbul 2–1; Montepaschi Siena 2–2; Partizan Belgrade 0–4.
  - Group H: Žalgiris Kaunas (Lithuania) 85–84 (OT) (Turkey) Fenerbahçe Ülker
    - Standings: Fenerbahçe Ülker 3–1; (Greece) Olympiacos Piraeus 2–1; (Spain) Power Electronics Valencia 1–2; Žalgiris Kaunas 1–3.

==== Football (soccer) ====
- CONCACAF U-17 Championship in Montego Bay, Jamaica: (teams in **bold** advance to the quarter-finals, team in ~~strike~~ is eliminated)
  - Group A: **El Salvador** 3–0 ~~Haiti~~; Haiti was forced to forfeit due to an illness that struck the team.
    - Standings: El Salvador, **Costa Rica** 3 points (1 match), Haiti 0 (2).
  - Group B: Panama 0–0 Cuba
    - Standings: **United States** 3 points (1 match), Panama 1 (1), Cuba 1 (2).
- UEFA Champions League Round of 16, first leg:
  - Arsenal (England) 2–1 (Spain) Barcelona
  - Roma (Italy) 2–3 (Ukraine) Shakhtar Donetsk
- Copa Libertadores second stage:
  - Group 1: Once Caldas (Colombia) 0–3 (Peru) Universidad San Martín
  - Group 4: Unión Española (Chile) 2–2 (Chile) Universidad Católica
  - Group 6:
    - Emelec (Ecuador) 1–1 (Brazil) Internacional
    - Jaguares (Mexico) 2–0 (Bolivia) Jorge Wilstermann
  - Group 7: Cruzeiro (Brazil) 5–0 (Argentina) Estudiantes

==== Snooker ====
- Welsh Open in Newport, Wales:
  - Last 32:
    - Shaun Murphy (ENG) 0–4 **Matthew Stevens** (WAL)
    - **Stephen Hendry** (SCO) 4–0 Joe Perry (ENG)
    - **Stephen Maguire** (SCO) 4–2 Gerard Greene (NIR)
    - Ronnie O'Sullivan (ENG) 2–4 **Ryan Day** (WAL)
  - Last 16:
    - **John Higgins** (SCO) 4–1 Dave Harold (ENG)
    - **Mark Selby** (ENG) 4–2 Mark King (ENG)

=== February 15, 2011 (Tuesday) ===
==== Football (soccer) ====
- CONCACAF U-17 Championship in Montego Bay, Jamaica:
  - Group C: Jamaica 2–2 Trinidad and Tobago
  - Group D: Barbados 1–2 Honduras
- UEFA Champions League Round of 16, first leg:
  - Milan (Italy) 0–1 (England) Tottenham Hotspur
  - Valencia (Spain) 1–1 (Germany) Schalke 04
    - Schalke's Raúl becomes the most prolific goal scorer in European club competitions, scoring his 71st goal to surpass Filippo Inzaghi.
- UEFA Europa League Round of 32, first leg: Aris (Greece) 0–0 (England) Manchester City
- Copa Libertadores second stage:
  - Group 1: San Luis (Mexico) 1–2 (Paraguay) Libertad
  - Group 3: América (Mexico) 2–0 (Uruguay) Nacional
  - Group 4: Vélez Sársfield (Argentina) 3–0 (Venezuela) Caracas
  - Group 5: Deportivo Táchira (Venezuela) 0–0 (Brazil) Santos
  - Group 7: Deportes Tolima (Colombia) 1–0 (Paraguay) Guaraní

==== Snooker ====
- Welsh Open in Newport, Wales, last 32:
  - **Mark Williams** (WAL) 4–0 Marco Fu (HKG)
  - **Mark Allen** (NIR) 4–1 Rod Lawler (ENG)
  - **Mark Selby** (ENG) 4–3 Stuart Bingham (ENG)
  - **Peter Ebdon** (ENG) 4–2 Dominic Dale (WAL)
  - **Graeme Dott** (SCO) 4–1 Jamie Burnett (SCO)
  - **Neil Robertson** (AUS) 4–2 Nigel Bond (ENG)

=== February 14, 2011 (Monday) ===
==== Alpine skiing ====
- World Championships in Garmisch-Partenkirchen, Germany:
  - Men's super combined: (gold) Aksel Lund Svindal (NOR) 2:54.51 (1:59.49 / 55.02) (silver) Christof Innerhofer (ITA) 2:55.52 (2:00.67 / 54.85) (bronze) Peter Fill (ITA) 2:56.41 (2:00.83 / 55.58)
    - Svindal retains his world title, becoming the first man to do so since compatriot Kjetil André Aamodt won three successive combined titles between 1997 and 2001.

==== Football (soccer) ====
- CONCACAF U-17 Championship in Montego Bay, Jamaica:
  - Group A: Haiti 1–3 Costa Rica
  - Group B: Cuba 1–3 United States

==== Snooker ====
- Welsh Open in Newport, Wales, last 32:
  - **Ding Junhui** (CHN) 4–3 Marcus Campbell (SCO)
  - Ricky Walden (ENG) 3–4 **Dave Harold** (ENG)
  - **Ali Carter** (ENG) 4–3 Barry Hawkins (ENG)
  - **John Higgins** (SCO) 4–3 Jack Lisowski (ENG)
  - **Mark King** (ENG) 4–1 Michael Holt (ENG)
  - **Jamie Cope** (ENG) 4–3 Rory McLeod (ENG)

=== February 13, 2011 (Sunday) ===
==== Alpine skiing ====
- World Championships in Garmisch-Partenkirchen, Germany:
  - Women's downhill: (gold) Elisabeth Görgl (AUT) 1:47.24 (silver) Lindsey Vonn (USA) 1:47.68 (bronze) Maria Riesch (GER) 1:47.84
    - Görgl wins her second title of the championships and the third for Austrian women, and denies Vonn a second successive title in downhill.

==== Auto racing ====
- World Rally Championship:
  - Rally Sweden in Karlstad, Sweden: (1) Mikko Hirvonen (FIN)/Jarmo Lehtinen (FIN) (Ford Fiesta RS WRC) 3:23:56.6 (2) Mads Østberg (NOR)/Jonas Andersson (SWE) (Ford Fiesta RS WRC) 3:24:03.1 (3) Jari-Matti Latvala (FIN)/Miikka Anttila (FIN) (Ford Fiesta RS WRC) 3:24:30.6

==== Basketball ====
- ASEAN Basketball League finals, game 1:
  - Chang Thailand Slammers 66–58 (Philippines) AirAsia Philippine Patriots
    - Chang Thailand Slammers lead best-of-3 series 1–0.
- (Italy) Italian Cup Final in Turin:
  - **Montepaschi Siena** 79–72 Bennet Cantù
    - Montepaschi Siena win the Cup for the third successive time.
- (Spain) Spanish Cup final in Madrid:
  - Real Madrid 60–68 **Regal FC Barcelona**
    - Regal FC Barcelona win the Cup for the second successive time and 22nd overall.
- (Turkey) Turkish Cup final in Kayseri:
  - Beşiktaş Cola Turka 72–81 **Fenerbahçe Ülker**
    - Fenerbahçe Ülker win the Cup for the second successive time and third overall.
- (France) Semaine des As Cup final in Pau:
  - **Gravelines** 79–71 Chalon-sur-Saône

==== Biathlon ====
- World Cup 8 in Fort Kent, United States:
  - Men's 15 km Mass Start: (gold) Martin Fourcade (FRA) 39:48.9 (0+0+2+0) (silver) Tomasz Sikora (POL) 39:52.0 (0+0+0+0) (bronze) Tarjei Bø (NOR) 39:53.6 (0+0+1+1)
    - Mass Start standings (after 3 of 5 races): (1) Fourcade 163 points (2) Bø 134 (3) Emil Hegle Svendsen (NOR) 124
    - Overall standings (after 19 of 26 races): (1) Bø 823 points (2) Svendsen 750 (3) Fourcade 724
  - Women's 12.5 km Mass Start: (gold) Magdalena Neuner (GER) 39:30.6 (0+0+0+1) (silver) Andrea Henkel (GER) 39:54.2 (0+0+1+0) (bronze) Darya Domracheva (BLR) 39:59.3 (1+0+0+0)
    - Mass Start standings (after 3 of 5 races): (1) Henkel 134 points (2) Tora Berger (NOR) 133 (3) Neuner 130
    - Overall standings (after 19 of 26 races): (1) Henkel 753 points (2) Kaisa Mäkäräinen (FIN) 744 (3) Helena Ekholm (SWE) 723

==== Field hockey ====
- Men's Indoor World Cup in Poznań, Poland:
  - Bronze medal match: Russia 0–5 (bronze) **Austria**
  - Gold medal match: (gold) **Germany** 3–2 (ET) (silver) Poland
    - Germany win the title for the third successive time.
- Women's Indoor World Cup in Poznań, Poland:
  - Bronze medal match: Belarus 2–4 (bronze) **Ukraine**
  - Gold medal match: (silver) Netherlands 2–4 (gold) **Germany**
    - Germany win the title for the second time.

==== Golf ====
- PGA Tour:
  - AT&T Pebble Beach National Pro-Am in Pebble Beach, California:
    - Winner: D. A. Points (USA) 271 (−15)
      - Points wins his first PGA Tour title.
- European Tour:
  - Dubai Desert Classic in Dubai, United Arab Emirates:
    - Winner: Álvaro Quirós (ESP) 277 (−11)
      - Quirós wins his fifth European Tour title.
- Champions Tour:
  - Allianz Championship in Boca Raton, Florida:
    - Winner: Tom Lehman (USA) 203 (−13)
      - Lehman wins his third Champions Tour title.

==== Luge ====
- World Cup in Paramonovo, Russia:
  - Men: (gold) Albert Demtschenko (RUS) 1:41.116 (50.420 / 50.696) (silver) Felix Loch (GER) 1:41.584 (51.006 / 50.578) (bronze) Andi Langenhan (GER) 1:41.738 (50.821 / 50.917)
    - Standings (after 8 of 9 races): (1) Armin Zöggeler (ITA) 665 points (2) Loch 630 (3) David Möller (GER) 466

==== Rugby union ====
- Six Nations Championship, week 2:
  - Ireland 22–25 France in Dublin
    - Standings (after 2 matches): England, France 4 points, Wales, Ireland 2, Scotland, Italy 0.
- IRB Sevens World Series:
  - USA Sevens in Whitney, Nevada:
    - Shield: **United States** 19–12 Japan
    - Bowl: Canada 14–19 **Scotland**
    - Plate: Kenya 15–26 **Samoa**
    - Cup: **South Africa** 24–14 Fiji
      - Standings (after 4 of 8 events): (1) England & New Zealand 80 points (3) Fiji & Samoa 64.

==== Short-track speed skating ====
- World Cup 5 in Moscow, Russia:
  - Men's:
    - 500 m: (gold) Simon Cho (USA) 42.157 (silver) Paul Stanley (GBR) 42.274 (bronze) Freek van der Wart (NED) 42.345
      - Standings (after 6 of 8 races): (1) Cho 2010 points (2) Charles Hamelin (CAN) 1722 points (3) Thibaut Fauconnet (FRA) 1635
    - 1000 m: (gold) Noh Jin-Kyu (KOR) 1:26.661 (silver) Fauconnet 1:26.774 (bronze) Travis Jayner (USA) 1:27.022
      - Standings (after 7 of 8 races): (1) Fauconnet 2800 points (2) Noh 2512 (3) Jayner 2080
    - 5000 m relay: (gold) Netherlands (Sjinkie Knegt, van der Wart, Niels Kerstholt, Daan Breeuwsma) 6:52.216 (silver) France (Fauconnet, Maxime Chataignier, Sébastien Lepape, Jeremy Masson) 6:52.609 (bronze) Canada (François Hamelin, Olivier Jean, Guillaume Blais Dufour, Michael Gilday) 7:00.055
      - Standings (after 5 of 6 races): (1) Canada 3000 points (2) United States 2240 (3) South Korea & Netherlands 2050
  - Women's:
    - 500 m: (gold) Marianne St-Gelais (CAN) 43.612 (silver) Liu Qiuhong (CHN) 44.026 (bronze) Martina Valcepina (ITA) 44.459
      - Standings (after 6 of 8 races): (1) Zhao Nannan (CHN) & St-Gelais 3000 points (3) Liu 2400
    - 1000 m: (gold) Katherine Reutter (USA) 1:32.076 (silver) Hwang Hyunsun (KOR) 1:32.197 (bronze) Kim Dam Min (KOR) 1:32.264
      - Standings (after 7 of 8 races): (1) Reutter 2800 points (2) Zhou Yang (CHN) 2440 (3) Yang Shin-young (KOR) 2000
    - 3000 m relay: (gold) China (Zhang Hui, Liu, Fan Kexin, Li Jianrou) 4:12.308 (silver) Canada (St-Gelais, Marie-Ève Drolet, Jessica Hewitt, Jessica Gregg) 4:12.687 (bronze) Italy (Arianna Fontana, Cecilia Maffei, Valcepina, Elena Viviani) 4:20.731
      - Standings (after 5 of 6 races): (1) China 3000 points (2) Canada 2240 (3) South Korea 2010

==== Ski jumping ====
- World Cup in Vikersund, Norway:
  - HS 225 (Ski flying): (gold) Gregor Schlierenzauer (AUT) 487.5 points (silver) Johan Remen Evensen (NOR) 476.7 (bronze) Adam Małysz (POL) 447.8
    - Ski flying standings (after 5 of 7 events): (1) Schlierenzauer 325 points (2) Martin Koch (AUT) 301 (3) Thomas Morgenstern (AUT) 262
    - Overall standings (after 23 of 26 events): (1) Morgenstern 1596 points (2) Simon Ammann (SUI) 1209 (3) Małysz 1045
      - Morgenstern wins his second World Cup title.

==== Snowboarding ====
- World Cup in Yabuli, China:
  - Men's halfpipe: (gold) Nathan Johnstone (AUS) (silver) Zhang Yiwei (CHN) (bronze) Shi Wancheng (CHN)
    - Halfpipe standings (after 2 of 6 races): (1) Tore Viken Holvik (NOR) & Johnstone 1000 points (3) Ryō Aono (JPN) & Zhang 800
    - Freestyle overall standings: (1) Sebastien Toutant (CAN) 1220 points (2) Rocco van Straten (NED) 1185 (3) Seppe Smits (BEL) 1180
  - Women's halfpipe: (gold) Liu Jiayu (CHN) (silver) Cai Xuetong (CHN) (bronze) Li Shuang (CHN)
    - Halfpipe standings (after 2 of 6 races): (1) Cai 1800 points (2) Liu 1000 (3) Chen Xu (CHN) 810
    - Freestyle overall standings: (1) Cai 1800 points (2) Liu 1000 (3) Chen 810

==== Speed skating ====
- World Allround Championships in Calgary, Canada:
  - Men:
    - 1500 m: (1) Ivan Skobrev (RUS) 1:42.94 (2) Jonathan Kuck (USA) 1:43.12 (3) Brian Hansen (USA) 1:43.35
    - 10000 m: (1) Håvard Bøkko (NOR) 12:53.89 (2) Skobrev 12:58.36 (3) Jan Blokhuijsen (NED) 13:00.04
      - Final standings: (gold) Skobrev 146.230 points (silver) Bøkko 146.408 (bronze) Blokhuijsen 146.603
        - Skobrev becomes the first Russian champion since the break-up of Soviet Union.
  - Women:
    - 1500 m: (1) Ireen Wüst (NED) 1:52.59 (2) Christine Nesbitt (CAN) 1:53.22 (3) Marrit Leenstra (NED) 1:53.88
    - 5000 m: (1) Stephanie Beckert (GER) 6:49.51 (2) Wüst 6:55.85 (3) Masako Hozumi (JPN) 6:56.35
      - Final standings: (gold) Wüst 157.313 points (silver) Nesbitt 158.939 (bronze) Martina Sáblíková (CZE) 159.288
        - Wüst wins her second world title.

==== Tennis ====
- ATP World Tour:
  - ABN AMRO World Tennis Tournament in Rotterdam, Netherlands:
    - Final: **Robin Söderling** (SWE) def. Jo-Wilfried Tsonga (FRA) 6–3, 3–6, 6–3
      - Söderling retains his title, winning his second title of the year, and the eighth of his career.
  - SAP Open in San Jose, United States:
    - Final: **Milos Raonic** (CAN) def. Fernando Verdasco (ESP) 7–6(6), 7–6(5)
      - Raonic becomes the first Canadian to win a singles title since Greg Rusedski at the 1995 Seoul Open.
- WTA Tour:
  - Open GDF Suez in Paris, France:
    - Final: **Petra Kvitová** (CZE) def. Kim Clijsters (BEL) 6–4, 6–3
      - Kvitová wins her second title of the year and third career title.
  - PTT Pattaya Open in Pattaya, Thailand:
    - Final: **Daniela Hantuchová** (SVK) def. Sara Errani (ITA) 6–0, 6–2
      - Hantuchová wins her fourth career title.

=== February 12, 2011 (Saturday) ===
==== Alpine skiing ====
- World Championships in Garmisch-Partenkirchen, Germany:
  - Men's downhill: (gold) Erik Guay (CAN) 1:58.41 (silver) Didier Cuche (SUI) 1:58.73 (bronze) Christof Innerhofer (ITA) 1:59.17
    - Guay becomes the second successive Canadian to win the men's downhill, after John Kucera's win in 2009.

==== Auto racing ====
- Sprint Cup Series:
  - Budweiser Shootout in Daytona Beach, Florida: (1) (Nevada) Kurt Busch (Dodge, Penske Racing) (2) (Missouri) Jamie McMurray (Chevrolet, Earnhardt Ganassi Racing) (3) (Indiana) Ryan Newman (Chevrolet, Stewart Haas Racing)
    - Busch wins the Shootout for the first time.
- V8 Supercars:
  - Yas V8 400 in Yas Marina, United Arab Emirates:
    - Race 2: (1) James Courtney (AUS) (Holden Racing Team, Holden VE Commodore) (2) Jason Bright (AUS) (Brad Jones Racing, Holden VE Commodore) (3) Jamie Whincup (AUS) (Triple Eight Race Engineering, Holden VE Commodore)
      - Drivers' championship standings (after 2 of 27 races): (1) Whincup 279 points (2) Alex Davison (AUS) (Stone Brothers Racing, Ford FG Falcon) 234 (3) Shane van Gisbergen (NZL) (Stone Brothers Racing, Ford FG Falcon) 210

==== Basketball ====
- (Poland) Polish Cup Final in Gdynia:
  - Anwil Włocławek 67–75 **Polpharma Starogard Gdański**
- (Serbia) Serbian Cup Final in Belgrade:
  - FMP 73–77 **Partizan**
    - Partizan win the Cup for the fourth successive time and 12th overall.

==== Biathlon ====
- World Cup 8 in Fort Kent, United States:
  - Men's 12.5 km Pursuit: (gold) Emil Hegle Svendsen (NOR) 35:46.0 (0+0+0+1) (silver) Martin Fourcade (FRA) 35:46.0 (0+0+1+0) (bronze) Tarjei Bø (NOR) 37:03.5 (1+0+0+2)
    - Pursuit standings (after 5 of 7 races): (1) Bø 232 points (2) Fourcade 212 (3) Svendsen 190
    - Overall standings (after 18 of 26 races): (1) Bø 775 points (2) Svendsen 712 (3) Fourcade 664
  - Women's 10 km Pursuit: (gold) Andrea Henkel (GER) 31:09.1 (0+0+1+0) (silver) Magdalena Neuner (GER) 31:33.9 (2+0+0+1) (bronze) Marie Dorin (FRA) 32:02.7 (0+0+0+0)
    - Pursuit standings (after 5 of 7 races): (1) Kaisa Mäkäräinen (FIN) 240 points (2) Henkel 212 (3) Helena Ekholm (SWE) 206
    - Overall standings (after 18 of 26 races): (1) Mäkäräinen 704 points (2) Henkel 699 (3) Ekholm 685

==== Equestrianism ====
- Show jumping:
  - FEI World Cup:
    - Western European League:
      - 11th competition in Vigo (CSI 5*-W): (gold) Michel Robert (FRA) on Kellemoi de Pepita (silver) Kevin Staut (FRA) on Silvana (bronze) Malin Baryard-Johnsson (SWE) on Tornesch
        - Standings (after 11 of 13 competitions): (1) Staut 87 points (2) Meredith Michaels-Beerbaum (GER) 73 (3) Rolf-Göran Bengtsson (SWE) 73
    - North American League – East Coast:
      - 13th competition in Wellington, Florida (CSI 3*-W): (gold) Laura Kraut (USA) on Cedric (silver) McLain Ward (USA) on Antares F (bronze) Pablo Barrios (VEN) on Quick Star
    - North American League – West Coast:
      - 13th competition in Thermal, California (CSI 2*-W): (gold) Eduardo Menezes (BRA) on Tomba (silver) John Perez (COL) on La Cantera Utopia (bronze) Meredith Michaels-Beerbaum (GER) on Kismet

==== Football (soccer) ====
- South American Youth Championship in Peru: (teams in **bold** qualify for 2012 Olympic tournament, teams in italics qualify for U-20 World Cup)
  - Final stage, matchday 5:
    - Colombia 0–2 Argentina
    - Ecuador 1–0 Chile
    - **Brazil** 6–0 **Uruguay**
      - Final standings: Brazil 12 points, Uruguay 10, Argentina 9, Ecuador 8, Chile 3, Colombia 1.
      - Brazil win the title for the third successive time and 11th overall.
      - Colombia qualify for U-20 World Cup as host.

==== Freestyle skiing ====
- World Cup in Moscow, Russia:
  - Men's Aerials: (gold) Anton Kushnir (BLR) 119.91 points (silver) Stanislav Kravchuk (UKR) 102.57 (bronze) Qi Guangpu (CHN) 102.57
    - Aerials standings (after 6 of 7 events): (1) Qi 421 points (2) Kushnir 328 (3) Jia Zongyang (CHN) 288
    - Overall standings: (1) Guilbaut Colas (FRA) 77 points (2) Andreas Matt (AUT) 71 (3) Qi 70
  - Women's Aerials: (gold) Emily Cook (USA) 93.06 points (silver) Olha Volkova (UKR) 85.83 (bronze) Zhang Xin (CHN) 84.10
    - Aerials standings (after 6 of 7 events): (1) Xu Mengtao (CHN) 420 points (2) Cheng Shuang (CHN) 342 (3) Volkova 293
    - Overall standings: (1) Hannah Kearney (USA) 87 points (2) Xu 70 (3) Jennifer Heil (CAN) & Heidi Zacher (GER) 59

==== Luge ====
- World Cup in Paramonovo, Russia:
  - Doubles: (gold) Andreas Linger/Wolfgang Linger (AUT) 1:33.189 (46.692 / 46.497) (silver) Tobias Wendl/Tobias Arlt (GER) 1:33.393 (46.666 / 46.727) (bronze) Andris Šics/Juris Šics (LAT) 1:33.450 (46.760 / 46.890)
    - Standings (after 8 of 9 races): (1) Wendl/Arlt 700 points (2) Linger/Linger 592 (3) Christian Oberstolz/Patrick Gruber (ITA) 586
      - Wendl and Arlt win their first World Cup title.
  - Women: (gold) Alex Gough (CAN) 1:33.536 (46.782 / 46.754) (silver) Carina Schwab (GER) 1:33.914 (46.939 / 46.975) (bronze) Natalie Geisenberger (GER) 1:33.935 (47.095 / 46.840)
    - Gough becomes the first non-German to win a World Cup race since Andrea Tagwerker (AUT) in 1997, ending a winning streak of 105 races for German lugers.
    - Standings (after 8 of 9 races): (1) Tatjana Hüfner (GER) 745 points (2) Geisenberger 630 (3) Anke Wischnewski (GER) 535
      - Hüfner wins her fourth consecutive World Cup title.

==== Mixed martial arts ====
- Strikeforce: Fedor vs. Silva in East Rutherford, New Jersey, United States:
  - Heavyweight Grand Prix quarterfinal bout: **Antônio Silva** (BRA) def. Fedor Emelianenko (RUS) via TKO (doctor stoppage)
  - Heavyweight Grand Prix quarterfinal bout: **Sergei Kharitonov** (RUS) def. Andrei Arlovski (BLR) via KO (punches)
    - Silva and Kharitonov advance to the Heavyweight Grand Prix semifinals.
  - Heavyweight Grand Prix reserve bout: **Shane del Rosario** (USA) def. Lavar Johnson (USA) via submission (armbar)
  - Heavyweight Grand Prix reserve bout: **Chad Griggs** (USA) def. Gianpiero Villante (USA) via TKO (punches)
  - Heavyweight Grand Prix reserve bout: **Valentijn Overeem** (NED) def. Ray Sefo (NZL) via submission (neck crank)

==== Rugby union ====
- Six Nations Championship, week 2:
  - England 59–13 Italy in London
  - Scotland 6–24 Wales in Edinburgh
    - Standings: England 4 points (2 matches), France 2 (1), Wales 2 (2), Ireland 2 (1), Scotland, Italy 0 (2).
- European Nations Cup First Division, week 2:
  - Georgia 60–0 Spain in Tbilisi
  - Russia 19–21 Portugal in Sochi
  - Ukraine – Romania in Kyiv — postponed due to bad weather.
    - Standings: Georgia 10 points (2 matches), Portugal 8 (2), Russia 5 (2), Romania 1 (1), Spain 1 (2), Ukraine 0 (1).

==== Short-track speed skating ====
- World Cup 5 in Moscow, Russia:
  - Men's:
    - 1000 m: (gold) Kim Byeong-jun (KOR) 1:26.726 (silver) François Hamelin (CAN) 1:27.068 (bronze) Liang Wenhao (CHN) 1:27.389
      - Standings (after 6 of 8 races): (1) Thibaut Fauconnet (FRA) 2800 points (2) Kim 2000 (3) Travis Jayner (USA) 1702
    - 1500 m: (gold) Noh Jin-kyu (KOR) 2:14.305 (silver) Travis Jayner (USA) 2:15.278 (bronze) Michael Gilday (CAN) 2:15.383
      - Standings (after 7 of 8 races): (1) Noh 2035 points (2) Maxime Chataignier (FRA) 1920 (3) Jeff Simon (USA) 1850
  - Women's:
    - 1000 m: (gold) Yang Shin-young (KOR) 1:32.640 (silver) Hwang Hyun-sun (KOR) 1:32.733 (bronze) Li Jiranrou (CHN) 1:33.110
      - Standings (after 6 of 8 races): (1) Zhou Yang (CHN) 2440 points (2) Yang 2000 (3) Katherine Reutter (USA) 1968
    - 1500 m: (gold) Katherine Reutter (USA) 2:23.535 (silver) Cho Ha-ri (KOR) 2:23.720 (bronze) Kim Dam-min (KOR) 2:23.928
      - Standings (after 7 of 8 races): (1) Reutter 3000 points (2) Cho 2600 (3) Zhou Yang (CHN) 2440

==== Ski jumping ====
- World Cup in Vikersund, Norway:
  - HS 225 (Ski flying): (gold) Gregor Schlierenzauer (AUT) & Johan Remen Evensen (NOR) 498.6 points (bronze) Simon Ammann (SUI) 452.0
    - Ski flying standings (after 4 of 7 events): (1) Martin Koch (AUT) 265 points (2) Schlierenzauer 225 (3) Thomas Morgenstern (AUT) 217
    - Overall standings (after 22 of 26 events): (1) Morgenstern 1551 points (2) Ammann 1159 (3) Andreas Kofler (AUT) 1016

==== Speed skating ====
- World Allround Championships in Calgary, Canada:
  - Men:
    - 500 m: (1) Shani Davis (USA) 35.08 (2) Brian Hansen (USA) 35.33 (3) Konrad Niedźwiedzki (POL) 35.35
    - 5000 m: (1) Ivan Skobrev (RUS) 6:10.99 (2) Koen Verweij (NED) 6:12.20 (3) Håvard Bøkko (NOR) 6:12.98
      - Standings after day 1: (1) Verweij 72.860 points (2) Skobrev 72.999 (3) Jan Blokhuijsen (NED) 73.008
  - Women:
    - 500 m: (1) Christine Nesbitt (CAN) 37.72 (2) Karolína Erbanová (CZE) 38.22 (3) Ireen Wüst (NED) & Marrit Leenstra (NED) 38.53
    - 3000 m: (1) Martina Sáblíková (CZE) 3:55.55 (2) Wüst 3:58.01 (3) Stephanie Beckert (GER) 4:00.77
      - Standings after day 1: (1) Wüst 78.198 points (2) Nesbitt 78.293 (3) Sáblíková 78.748

==== Tennis ====
- ATP World Tour:
  - Brasil Open in Costa do Sauípe, Brazil:
    - Final: **Nicolás Almagro** (ESP) def. Alexandr Dolgopolov (UKR) 6–3, 7–6(3)
      - Almagro wins his eighth career title, and second win at the event, also winning in 2008.

=== February 11, 2011 (Friday) ===
==== Alpine skiing ====
- World Championships in Garmisch-Partenkirchen, Germany:
  - Women's super combined: (gold) Anna Fenninger (AUT) 2:43.23 (1:49.67 / 53.56) (silver) Tina Maze (SLO) 2:43.32 (1:50.38 / 52.94) (bronze) Anja Pärson (SWE) 2:43.50 (1:49.54 / 53.96)
    - Fenninger repeats her teammate Kathrin Zettel's victory from 2009, and becomes the sixth Austrian to win the women's super combined title.

==== Auto racing ====
- V8 Supercars:
  - Yas V8 400 in Yas Marina, United Arab Emirates:
    - Race 1: (1) Jamie Whincup (AUS) (Triple Eight Race Engineering, Holden VE Commodore) (2) Alex Davison (AUS) (Stone Brothers Racing, Ford FG Falcon) (3) Mark Winterbottom (AUS) (Ford Performance Racing, Ford FG Falcon)

==== Biathlon ====
- World Cup 8 in Fort Kent, United States:
  - Women's 7.5 km Sprint: (gold) Andrea Henkel (GER) 23:20.0 (0+0) (silver) Miriam Gössner (GER) 23:30.9 (0+2) (bronze) Magdalena Neuner (GER) 23:35.8 (1+1)
    - Sprint standings (after 8 of 10 races): (1) Kaisa Mäkäräinen (FIN) 315 points (2) Henkel 292 (3) Neuner 284
    - Overall standings (after 17 of 26 races): (1) Mäkäräinen 664 points (2) Helena Ekholm (SWE) 656 (3) Henkel 639

==== Freestyle skiing ====
- World Cup in Blue Mountain, Canada:
  - Men's Ski Cross: (gold) Christopher Del Bosco (CAN) (silver) Andreas Matt (AUT) (bronze) Tomáš Kraus (CZE)
    - Ski Cross standings (after 7 of 11 events): (1) Matt 499 points (2) Del Bosco 325 (3) Nick Zoricic (CAN) 239
    - Overall standings: (1) Guilbaut Colas (FRA) 77 points (2) Qi Guangpu (CHN) 72 (3) Matt 71
  - Women's Ski Cross: (gold) Anna Wörner (GER) (silver) Fanny Smith (SUI) (bronze) Jenny Owens (AUS)
    - Ski Cross standings (after 7 of 11 events): (1) Heidi Zacher (GER) 412 points (2) Kelsey Serwa (CAN) 374 (3) Anna Holmlund (SWE) 372
    - Overall standings: (1) Hannah Kearney (USA) 87 points (2) Xu Mengtao (CHN) 84 (3) Cheng Shuang (CHN) 63

==== Ski jumping ====
- Johan Remen Evensen (NOR) twice breaks the world record for the longest ski jump during qualification for the World Cup event in Vikersund, Norway. Evensen advances the record to 246.5 metres, 7.5 longer than the old mark set by teammate Bjørn Einar Romøren at Planica in 2005.

==== Tennis ====
- Kim Clijsters (BEL) defeats Jelena Dokić (AUS) 6–3, 6–0 in the quarterfinals of Open GDF Suez in Paris to become the World no. 1 on the WTA rankings next Monday. She is the first ever mother at the top of the standings.

=== February 10, 2011 (Thursday) ===
==== Basketball ====
- (Israel) Israeli State Cup Final in Tel Aviv:
  - **Maccabi Tel Aviv** 106–70 Barak Netanya
    - Maccabi Tel Aviv win the Cup for the second straight time and 38th overall. Four players, two of each team, are ejected following a brawl in the third period. The margin of victory is the third largest in Cup finals history.
- NBA news:
  - Jerry Sloan, head coach of the Utah Jazz since 1988 and the longest-tenured head coach in any of North America's four major leagues, announces his resignation effective immediately. Assistant Tyrone Corbin is named as Sloan's permanent replacement.
  - In the Boston Celtics' 92–86 loss to the Los Angeles Lakers, the Celtics' Ray Allen becomes the NBA's all-time leader in career three-pointers, surpassing Reggie Miller.

==== Biathlon ====
- World Cup 8 in Fort Kent, United States:
  - Men's 10 km Sprint: (gold) Emil Hegle Svendsen (NOR) 24:51.4 (0+1) (silver) Michal Šlesingr (CZE) 24:58.6 (0+0) (bronze) Tarjei Bø (NOR) 25:00.7 (0+0)
    - Sprint standings (after 8 of 10 races): (1) Bø 345 points (2) Svendsen 291 (3) Michael Greis (GER) 254
    - Overall standings (after 17 of 26 races): (1) Bø 727 points (2) Svendsen 652 (3) Martin Fourcade (FRA) 610

==== Darts ====
- Premier League, week 1 in London, England:
  - Mark Webster (WAL) 8–3 James Wade (ENG)
  - Gary Anderson (SCO) 8–5 Simon Whitlock (AUS)
  - Raymond van Barneveld (NED) 6–8 Terry Jenkins (ENG)
  - Adrian Lewis (ENG) 8–2 Phil Taylor (ENG)
    - High Checkout: Anderson 120

=== February 9, 2011 (Wednesday) ===
==== Alpine skiing ====
- World Championships in Garmisch-Partenkirchen, Germany:
  - Men's super-G: (gold) Christof Innerhofer (ITA) 1:38.31 (silver) Hannes Reichelt (AUT) 1:38.91 (bronze) Ivica Kostelić (CRO) 1:39.03
    - Innerhofer becomes the second Italian to win the men's super-G title after Patrick Staudacher in 2007.

==== Football (soccer) ====
- Nations Cup in Dublin, Republic of Ireland:
  - Northern Ireland 0–3 Scotland
- Friendly internationals: (top 10 in FIFA World Rankings)
  - (1) Spain 1–0 Colombia
  - (2) Netherlands 3–1 Austria
  - (3) Germany 1–1 Italy
  - France 1–0 (4) Brazil
  - (5) Argentina 2–1 (8) Portugal in Geneva, Switzerland
  - Denmark 1–2 (6) England
  - (9) Croatia 4–2 Czech Republic
  - (10) Greece 1–0 Canada
- South American Youth Championship in Peru: (team in **bold** qualify for 2012 Olympic tournament, teams in italics qualify for U-20 World Cup)
  - Final stage, matchday 4:
    - Colombia 1–3 Chile
    - Argentina 0–1 **Uruguay**
    - Brazil 1–0 Ecuador
      - Standings (after 4 matches): Uruguay 10 points, Brazil 9, Argentina 6, Ecuador 5, Chile 3, Colombia 1.
      - Colombia qualify for U-20 World Cup as host.
- Copa Libertadores second stage:
  - Group 3: Fluminense (Brazil) 2–2 (Argentina) Argentinos Juniors

==== Golf ====
- Frank Chirkinian, executive producer for CBS Sports' televised golf coverage from 1959 to 1996, is announced as part of the 2011 induction class of the World Golf Hall of Fame. He will be formally enshrined alongside five other inductees on May 9.

==== Snowboarding ====
- World Cup in Yongpyong, South Korea:
  - Men's parallel giant slalom: (gold) Benjamin Karl (AUT) (silver) Siegfried Grabner (AUT) (bronze) Aaron March (ITA)
    - Parallel slalom standings (after 6 of 10 races): (1) Karl 3910 points (2) Roland Fischnaller (ITA) 3120 (3) Andreas Prommegger (AUT) and March 3100
    - Overall standings: (1) Karl 3910 points (2) Fischnaller 3120 (3) Prommegger & March 3100
  - Women's parallel giant slalom: (gold) Marion Kreiner (AUT) (silver) Fränzi Mägert-Kohli (SUI) (bronze) Svetlana Boldykova (RUS)
    - Parallel slalom standings (after 6 of 10 races): (1) Yekaterina Tudegesheva (RUS) 4180 points (2) Mägert-Kohli 3910 (3) Kreiner 2640
    - Overall standings: (1) Tudegesheva 4180 points (2) Mägert-Kohli 3910 (3) Dominique Maltais (CAN) 3000

=== February 8, 2011 (Tuesday) ===
==== Alpine skiing ====
- World Championships in Garmisch-Partenkirchen, Germany:
  - Women's super-G: (gold) Elisabeth Görgl (AUT) 1:23.82 (silver) Julia Mancuso (USA) 1:23.87 (bronze) Maria Riesch (GER) 1:24.03
    - Görgl wins her first World Championship title.

==== Football (soccer) ====
- Nations Cup in Dublin, Republic of Ireland:
  - Republic of Ireland 3–0 Wales

==== Snowboarding ====
- World Cup in Yongpyong, South Korea:
  - Both snowboard cross events are cancelled due to unsafe course conditions.

=== February 7, 2011 (Monday) ===
==== Baseball ====
- Caribbean Series in Mayagüez, Puerto Rico:
  - (Mexico) Yaquis de Obregón 3, (Venezuela) Caribes de Anzoátegui 2.
  - (Dominican Republic) Toros del Este 3, (Puerto Rico) Criollos de Caguas 0.
    - Final standings: Yaquis de Obregón 4–2, Toros del Este, Criollos de Caguas 3–3, Caribes de Anzoátequi 2–4.
      - Yaquis de Obregón win the series for the first time.

==== Basketball ====
- The Cleveland Cavaliers set an NBA record for the longest losing streak in history, losing 99–96 to the Dallas Mavericks in Dallas. The Cavs' 25th straight loss breaks the record that the franchise set from 1982 to 1983.

==== Golf ====
- PGA Tour:
  - Waste Management Phoenix Open in Scottsdale, Arizona:
    - Winner: Mark Wilson (USA) 266 (−18)^{PO}
      - Wilson wins his second PGA Tour title of the season, and his fourth career title, defeating Jason Dufner (USA) on the second playoff hole.

=== February 6, 2011 (Sunday) ===
==== Alpine skiing ====
- Men's World Cup in Hinterstoder, Austria:
  - Giant slalom: (gold) Philipp Schörghofer (AUT) 2:46.44 (1:21.49 / 1:24.95) (silver) Kjetil Jansrud (NOR) 2:46.61 (1:21.14 / 1:25.47) (bronze) Carlo Janka (SUI) 2:46.64 (1:21.69 / 1:24.95)
    - Giant slalom standings (after 5 of 7 races): (1) Ted Ligety (USA) 323 points (2) Aksel Lund Svindal (NOR) 297 (3) Cyprien Richard (FRA) 253
    - Overall standings (after 27 of 38 races): (1) Ivica Kostelić (CRO) 1249 points (2) Didier Cuche (SUI) 725 (3) Svindal 713
- Women's World Cup in Arber-Zwiesel, Germany:
  - Giant slalom: (gold) Viktoria Rebensburg (GER) 1:36.96 (45.82 / 51.14) (silver) Federica Brignone (ITA) 1:37.49 (47.44 / 50.05) (bronze) Kathrin Zettel (AUT) 1:37.85 (47.00 / 50.85)
    - Giant slalom standings (after 5 of 8 races): (1) Tessa Worley (FRA) 358 points (2) Rebensburg 335 (3) Tanja Poutiainen (FIN) 216
    - Overall standings (after 23 of 38 races): (1) Maria Riesch (GER) 1256 points (2) Lindsey Vonn (USA) 1100 (3) Elisabeth Görgl (AUT) 678

==== American football ====
- Super Bowl XLV in Arlington, Texas:
  - Green Bay Packers 31, Pittsburgh Steelers 25
    - The Packers win their first Super Bowl since 1997, and their fourth overall.

==== Auto racing ====
- Polish Formula One driver for the Renault F1 team, Robert Kubica sustains serious injuries in a potentially career ending accident while competing privately in a minor motor rally in Italy.
- Bathurst 12 Hour in Bathurst, Australia:
  - (1) Marc Basseng (DEU), Christopher Mies (DEU) & Darryl O'Young (HKG) (Joest Racing Audi R8 LMS) 292 laps, (2) Mark Eddy (AUS), Craig Lowndes (AUS) & Warren Luff (AUS) (Joest Racing Audi R8 LMS) 292 laps, (3) Craig Baird (NZL), Klark Quinn (AUS) & Tony Quinn (GBR) (VIP Pet Foods Racing Porsche 997 GT3 Cup R) 291 laps
    - Joest Racing's official Audi team wins the 12 Hour on their first attempt with a new record race distance. The race win was also the first competition victory for the Audi R8 GT3.

==== Baseball ====
- Caribbean Series in Mayagüez, Puerto Rico:
  - (Venezuela) Caribes de Anzoátegui 3, (Dominican Republic) Toros del Este 0.
  - (Puerto Rico) Criollos de Caguas 7, (Mexico) Yaquis de Obregón 6.
    - Standings (after 5 games): Yaquis de Obregón, Criollos de Caguas 3–2, Caribes de Anzoátequi, Toros del Este 2–3.

==== Biathlon ====
- World Cup 7 in Presque Isle, United States:
  - Men's 12.5 km Pursuit: (gold) Alexis Bœuf (FRA) 36:02.4 (0+1+0+1) (silver) Ivan Tcherezov (RUS) 36:12.7 (1+1+2+0) (bronze) Carl Johan Bergman (SWE) 36:16.7 (1+0+0+2)
    - Pursuit standings (after 4 of 7 races): (1) Tarjei Bø (NOR) 184 points (2) Martin Fourcade (FRA) 158 (3) Ivan Tcherezov (RUS) 142
    - Overall standings (after 16 of 26 races): (1) Bø 679 points (2) Emil Hegle Svendsen (NOR) 592 (3) Fourcade 567
  - Women's 10 km Pursuit: (gold) Tora Berger (NOR) 35:12.1 (0+1+2+1) (silver) Marie Dorin (FRA) 35:42.8 (0+0+1+2) (bronze) Darya Domracheva (BLR) 36:23.3 (0+0+3+2)
    - Pursuit standings (after 4 of 7 races): (1) Kaisa Mäkäräinen (FIN) 200 points (2) Helena Ekholm (SWE) 177 (3) Domracheva 158
    - Overall standings (after 16 of 26 races): (1) Ekholm 637 points (2) Mäkäräinen 630 (3) Andrea Henkel (GER) 579

==== Bobsleigh ====
- World Cup in Cesana, Italy:
  - Four-man: (gold) Alexandr Zubkov/Philipp Egorov/Dmitry Trunenkov/Nikolay Hrenkov (RUS) 1:49.15 (54.42 / 54.73) (silver) Edgars Maskalāns/Daumants Dreiškens/Ugis Zalims/Intars Dambis (LAT) 1:49.22 (54.42 / 54.80) (bronze) Lyndon Rush/Justin Wilkinson/Cody Sorensen/Neville Wright (CAN) 1:49.35 (54.57 / 54.78)
    - Final standings: (1) Manuel Machata (GER) 1597 points (2) Steve Holcomb (USA) 1522 (3) Zubkov 1420
      - Machata wins his first World Cup title.

==== Cricket ====
- England in Australia:
  - 7th ODI in Perth: Australia 279/7 (50 overs); England 222 (44 overs). **Australia win by 57 runs; win 7-match series 6–1.**
- West Indies in Sri Lanka:
  - 3rd ODI in Colombo: Sri Lanka 277/9 (50 overs); West Indies 251 (49 overs). **Sri Lanka win by 26 runs; win 3-match series 2–0.**

==== Cross-country skiing ====
- World Cup in Rybinsk, Russia:
  - Men's 4 x 10 km relay: (gold) Russia I (Evgeniy Belov, Maxim Vylegzhanin, Petr Sedov, Alexander Legkov) 1:37:37.6 (silver) Italy I (Valerio Checchi, Giorgio Di Centa, Roland Clara, Pietro Piller Cottrer) 1:37:44.0 (bronze) Germany (Andy Kuehne, Franz Göring, Tom Reichelt, Tobias Angerer) 1:38:10.1
  - Women's 4 x 5 km relay: (gold) Italy (Magda Genuin, Marianna Longa, Silvia Rupil, Arianna Follis) 53:15.3 (silver) Russia I (Valentina Novikova, Svetlana Nikolaeva, Yuliya Chekaleva, Olga Mikhailova) 53:27.4 (bronze) Russia II (Anastasia Kasakul, Julia Tikhonova, Julia Ivanova, Natalya Korostelyova) 54:39.4

==== Darts ====
- Players Championship Finals (1) in Doncaster, England:
  - Final: **Phil Taylor** (ENG) 13–2 Gary Anderson (SCO)

==== Football (soccer) ====
- South American Youth Championship in Peru: (teams in italics qualify for U-20 World Cup)
  - Final stage, matchday 3:
    - Uruguay 1–0 Chile
    - Ecuador 0–0 Colombia
    - Argentina 2–1 Brazil
      - Standings (after 3 matches): Uruguay 7 points, Brazil, Argentina 6, Ecuador 5, Colombia 1, Chile 0.
      - Colombia qualify for U-20 World Cup as host.

==== Golf ====
- European Tour:
  - Qatar Masters in Doha, Qatar:
    - Winner: Thomas Bjørn (DEN) 274 (−14)
      - Bjørn wins his eleventh European Tour title.

==== Ski jumping ====
- World Cup in Oberstdorf, Germany:
  - HS 213 Team (Ski flying): (gold) Austria (Thomas Morgenstern, Andreas Kofler, Gregor Schlierenzauer, Martin Koch) 1579.1 points (silver) Norway (Johan Remen Evensen, Anders Jacobsen, Bjørn Einar Romøren, Tom Hilde) 1528.6 (bronze) Germany (Michael Neumayer, Richard Freitag, Michael Uhrmann, Severin Freund) 1479.2

==== Snooker ====
- German Masters in Berlin, Germany:
  - Final: Mark Selby (ENG) 7–9 **Mark Williams** (WAL)
    - Williams wins his 18th ranking title.

==== Tennis ====
- ATP World Tour:
  - SA Tennis Open in Johannesburg, South Africa:
    - Final: **Kevin Anderson** (RSA) def. Somdev Devvarman (IND) 4–6, 6–3, 6–2
      - Anderson wins his first ATP Tour title.
  - PBZ Zagreb Indoors in Zagreb, Croatia:
    - Final: **Ivan Dodig** (CRO) def. Michael Berrer (GER) 6–3, 6–4
      - Dodig wins his first ATP Tour title.
  - Movistar Open in Santiago, Chile:
    - Final: **Tommy Robredo** (ESP) def. Santiago Giraldo (COL) 6–2, 2–6, 7–6(5)
      - Robredo wins his tenth ATP Tour title.
- Fed Cup World Group First round, day 2:
  - Australia 1–4 **Italy**
    - Francesca Schiavone (ITA) def. Samantha Stosur (AUS) 7–6(1), 3–6, 7–5
    - Flavia Pennetta (ITA) def. Jarmila Groth (AUS) 6–3, 6–2
    - Sara Errani/Roberta Vinci (ITA) def. Anastasia Rodionova/Rennae Stubbs (AUS) 2–6, 7–6(1), 6–4
  - **Russia** 3–2 France
    - Anastasia Pavlyuchenkova (RUS) def. Alizé Cornet (FRA) 3–6, 6–3, 6–2
    - Svetlana Kuznetsova (RUS) def. Virginie Razzano (FRA) 6–4, 6–4
    - Pavlyuchenkova/Kuznetsova (RUS) def. Julie Coin/Cornet (FRA) 7–6(4), 6–0
  - Slovakia 2–3 **Czech Republic**
    - Petra Kvitová (CZE) def. Daniela Hantuchová (SVK) 6–4, 6–2
    - Jana Čepelová (SVK) def. Lucie Šafářová (CZE) 4–6, 7–6(5) retired
    - Čepelová/Magdaléna Rybáriková (SVK) def. Květa Peschke/Barbora Záhlavová-Strýcová (CZE) 6–1, 4–6, 7–6(4)
  - **Belgium** 4–1 United States
    - Kim Clijsters (BEL) def. Bethanie Mattek-Sands (USA) 6–7(10), 6–2, 6–1
    - Yanina Wickmayer (BEL) def. Melanie Oudin (USA) 6–2, 6–0
    - Liezel Huber/Vania King (USA) def. Kirsten Flipkens/An-Sophie Mestach (BEL) 6–3, 7–5

=== February 5, 2011 (Saturday) ===
==== Alpine skiing ====
- Men's World Cup in Hinterstoder, Austria:
  - Super-G: (gold) Hannes Reichelt (AUT) 1:43.91 (silver) Benjamin Raich (AUT) 1:44.25 (bronze) Bode Miller (USA) 1:44.84
    - Super G standings (after 5 of 7 races): (1) Georg Streitberger (AUT) 227 points (2) Didier Cuche (SUI) & Ivica Kostelić (CRO) 191
    - Overall standings (after 26 of 38 races): (1) Kostelić 1223 points (2) Silvan Zurbriggen (SUI) 703 (3) Cuche 685
- Women's World Cup in Arber-Zwiesel, Germany:
  - Giant slalom: Cancelled due to strong winds and bad visibility.

==== American football ====
- NCAA bowl games:
  - NFLPA All-Star Game (Texas vs The Nation) in San Antonio, Texas: Texas 13, The Nation 7
    - In the season's final college football game, Texas linebacker Eddie Jones holds up Damien Berry on fourth down with under a minute remaining, to secure victory.

==== Baseball ====
- Caribbean Series in Mayagüez, Puerto Rico:
  - (Mexico) Yaquis de Obregón 6, (Dominican Republic) Toros del Este 3
  - (Puerto Rico) Criollos de Caguas 4, (Venezuela) Caribes de Anzoátegui 2
    - Standings (after 4 games): Yaquis de Obregón 3–1, Toros del Este, Criollos de Caguas 2–2, Caribes de Anzoátequi 1–3.

==== Biathlon ====
- World Cup 7 in Presque Isle, United States:
  - Mixed Relay: (gold) Germany (Kathrin Hitzer, Magdalena Neuner, Alexander Wolf, Daniel Böhm) 1:13:31.6 (0+11) (silver) France (Marie-Laure Brunet, Sophie Boilley, Vincent Jay, Alexis Bœuf) 1:13:59.5 (0+7) (bronze) Russia (Svetlana Sleptsova, Natalia Guseva, Ivan Tcherezov, Maxim Tchoudov) 1:14:33.0 (0+13)
    - Standings (after 2 of 3 races): (1) France 102 points (2) Sweden 98 (3) Germany 94

==== Bobsleigh ====
- World Cup in Cesana, Italy:
  - Two-man: (gold) Simone Bertazzo/Matteo Torchio (ITA) 1:50.96 (55.43 / 55.53) (silver) Beat Hefti/Thomas Lamparter (SUI) 1:51.10 (55.65 / 55.45) (bronze) Thomas Florschütz/Kevin Kuske (GER) 1:51.11 (55.58 / 55.53)
    - Final standings: (1) Alexandr Zubkov (RUS) 1614 points (2) Manuel Machata (GER) 1516 (3) Bertazzo 1476
      - Zubkov becomes the first Russian to win the two-man title, to add to his three four-man titles.
  - Two-woman: (gold) Helen Upperton/Shelley-Ann Brown (CAN) 1:54.21 (56.99 / 57.22) (silver) Esmé Kamphuis/Judith Vis (NED) 1:54.50 (57.17 / 57.33) (bronze) Sandra Kiriasis/Stephanie Schneider (GER) 1:54.52 (57.19 / 57.33)
    - Final standings: (1) Kiriasis 1711 points (2) Cathleen Martini (GER) 1563 (3) Kaillie Humphries (CAN) 1400
      - Kiriasis wins her eighth successive title, and Germany wins for the tenth successive time.

==== Cricket ====
- Pakistan in New Zealand:
  - 6th ODI in Auckland: New Zealand 311/7 (50 overs; Jesse Ryder 107); Pakistan 254 (44.1 overs). **New Zealand win by 57 runs; Pakistan win 6-match series 3–2.**
- News: An International Cricket Council tribunal finds Pakistani cricketers Mohammad Amir, Mohammad Asif and Salman Butt guilty of corruption, relating to allegations of spot-fixing during the fourth Test of their tour of England in August 2010. Butt was banned for ten years with five years suspended, Asif was handed a seven-year ban with two years suspended, and Amir was given a five-year ban.

==== Cross-country skiing ====
- World Cup in Rybinsk, Russia:
  - Men's sprint freestyle: (gold) Alexei Petukhov (RUS) 2:32.7 (silver) Ola Vigen Hattestad (NOR) 2:34.1 (bronze) Anders Gløersen (NOR) 2:34.2
    - Sprint standings (after 8 of 11 races): (1) Hattestad 344 points (2) Emil Jönsson (SWE) 330 (3) Petukhov 277
    - Overall standings (after 23 of 31 races): (1) Dario Cologna (SUI) 1197 points (2) Petter Northug (NOR) 774 (3) Lukáš Bauer (CZE) 698
  - Women's sprint freestyle: (gold) Vesna Fabjan (SLO) 2:54.3 (silver) Katja Višnar (SLO) 2:55.0 (bronze) Justyna Kowalczyk (POL) 2:55.0
    - Sprint standings (after 8 of 11 races): (1) Petra Majdič (SLO) 354 points (2) Arianna Follis (ITA) 333 (3) Kikkan Randall (USA) 291
    - Overall standings (after 23 of 31 races): (1) Kowalczyk 1576 points (2) Follis 975 (3) Marit Bjørgen (NOR) 922

==== Equestrianism ====
- Show jumping:
  - FEI World Cup Western European League:
    - 10th competition in Bordeaux (CSI 5*-W): (gold) Philipp Weishaupt (GER) on Catoki (silver) Simon Delestre (FRA) on Napoli du Ry (bronze) Rolf-Göran Bengtsson (SWE) on Ninja
      - Standings (after 10 of 13 competitions): (1) Kevin Staut (FRA) 87 points (2) Bengtsson 73 (3) Billy Twomey (IRL) 63
- Four-in-hand driving:
  - FEI World Cup:
    - 7th competition in Bordeaux (CAI-W): (gold) IJsbrand Chardon (NED) (silver) Tomas Eriksson (SWE) (bronze) Werner Ulrich (SUI)
      - Final standings: (1) Boyd Exell (AUS) 27 points (2) Koos de Ronde (NED) 25 (3) Jozsef Dobrovitz (HUN) 24

==== Football (soccer) ====
- OFC Champions League Group stage, matchday 4:
  - Group A:
    - Lautoka (Fiji) 1–6 (Solomon Islands) Koloale
    - Amicale (Vanuatu) 3–3 (Papua New Guinea) PRK Hekari United
      - Standings (after 4 matches): Amicale, Lautoka 7 points, PRK Hekari United 5, Koloale 3.

==== Freestyle skiing ====
- World Championships in Deer Valley and Park City, United States:
  - Men's halfpipe: (gold) Micheal Riddle (CAN) 45.6 points (silver) Kevin Rolland (FRA) 45.2 (bronze) Simon Dumont (USA) 43.2
    - Riddle wins his first world title.
  - Women's halfpipe: (gold) Rosalind Groenewoud (CAN) 44.7 points (silver) Jen Hudak (USA) 42.1 (bronze) Keltie Hansen (CAN) 38.8
    - Groenewoud wins her first world title.
  - Men's Dual Moguls: (gold) Alexandre Bilodeau (CAN) (silver) Mikaël Kingsbury (CAN) (bronze) Nobuyuki Nishi (JPN)
    - Bilodeau wins his second consecutive world title.
  - Women's Dual Moguls: (gold) Jennifer Heil (CAN) (silver) Chloé Dufour-Lapointe (CAN) (bronze) Hannah Kearney (USA)
    - Heil completes the moguls double to win her third consecutive dual moguls title, and fourth title overall.

==== Mixed martial arts ====
- UFC 126 in Las Vegas, United States:
  - Middleweight Championship bout: **Anderson Silva** (BRA) (c) def. Vitor Belfort (BRA) via TKO (strikes)
  - Light Heavyweight bout: **Forrest Griffin** (USA) def. Rich Franklin (USA) by unanimous decision (29–28, 29–28, 29–28)
  - Welterweight bout: **Jake Ellenberger** (USA) def. Carlos Eduardo Rocha (BRA) by split decision (27–30, 29–28, 29–28)
  - Light Heavyweight bout: **Jon Jones** (USA) def. Ryan Bader (USA) by submission (guillotine choke)
  - Bantamweight bout: **Miguel Torres** (USA) def. Antonio Banuelos (USA) by unanimous decision (30–27, 30–27, 30–27)

==== Rugby union ====
- Six Nations Championship, week 1:
  - Italy 11–13 Ireland in Rome
  - France 34–21 Scotland in Saint-Denis
- European Nations Cup First Division, week 1:
  - Spain 24–28 Russia in Madrid
  - Portugal 24–17 Romania in Lisbon
  - Georgia 62–3 Ukraine in Tbilisi
- IRB Sevens World Series:
  - New Zealand Sevens in Wellington:
    - Shield: **United States** 19–12 France
    - Bowl: **Kenya** 19–0 Tonga
    - Plate: **Fiji** 26–12 South Africa
    - Cup: England 14–29 **New Zealand**
      - Standings (after 3 of 8 competitions): (1) England & New Zealand 64 points (3) Samoa 52

==== Ski jumping ====
- World Cup in Oberstdorf, Germany:
  - HS 213 (Ski flying): (gold) Martin Koch (AUT) 428.4 points (silver) Tom Hilde (NOR) 406.6 (bronze) Gregor Schlierenzauer (AUT) 404.5
    - Ski flying standings (after 3 of 7 events): (1) Koch 229 points (2) Thomas Morgenstern (AUT) 195 (3) Hilde 152
    - Overall standings (after 21 of 26 events): (1) Morgenstern 1529 points (2) Simon Ammann (SUI) 1099 (3) Andreas Kofler (AUT) 1016

==== Snooker ====
- German Masters in Berlin, Germany:
  - Quarter-finals:
    - **Graeme Dott** (SCO) 5–3 Stephen Maguire (SCO)
    - **Mark Selby** (ENG) 5–1 Ding Junhui (CHN)
    - **Mark Williams** (WAL) 5–1 Joe Perry (ENG)
    - Joe Swail (NIR) 1–5 **Marco Fu** (HKG)
  - Semi-finals:
    - Dott 4–6 **Selby**
    - **Williams** 6–3 Fu

==== Tennis ====
- Fed Cup World Group first round, day 1:
  - Australia 1–1 Italy
    - Jarmila Groth (AUS) def. Francesca Schiavone (ITA) 6–7(4), 6–3, 6–3
    - Flavia Pennetta (ITA) def. Samantha Stosur (AUS) 7–6(5), 6–7(5), 6–4
  - Russia 0–2 France
    - Alizé Cornet (FRA) def. Svetlana Kuznetsova (RUS) 3–6, 6–3, 6–4
    - Virginie Razzano (FRA) def. Maria Sharapova (RUS) 6–3, 6–4
  - Slovakia 0–2 Czech Republic
    - Lucie Šafářová (CZE) def. Daniela Hantuchová (SVK) 7–5, 6–1
    - Petra Kvitová (CZE) def. Dominika Cibulková (SVK) 6–2, 6–3
  - Belgium 2–0 United States
    - Yanina Wickmayer (BEL) def. Bethanie Mattek-Sands (USA) 6–1, 7–6(6)
    - Kim Clijsters (BEL) def. Melanie Oudin (USA) 6–0, 6–4

=== February 4, 2011 (Friday) ===
==== Alpine skiing ====
- Women's World Cup in Arber-Zwiesel, Germany:
  - Slalom: (gold) Marlies Schild (AUT) 1:55.19 (57.16 / 58.03) (silver) Veronika Zuzulová (SVK) 1:55.87 (56.72 / 59.15) (bronze) Tanja Poutiainen (FIN) 1:56.97 (57.43 / 59.54)
    - Slalom standings (after 7 of 10 races): (1) Schild 500 points (2) Poutiainen 460 (3) Maria Riesch (GER) 420
    - Overall standings (after 22 of 38 races): (1) Riesch 1232 points (2) Lindsey Vonn (USA) 1087 (3) Poutiainen 640

==== Baseball ====
- Caribbean Series in Mayagüez, Puerto Rico:
  - (Mexico) Yaquis de Obregón 7, (Venezuela) Caribes de Anzoátegui 3
  - (Dominican Republic) Toros del Este 4, (Puerto Rico) Criollos de Caguas 3
    - Standings (after 3 games): Toros del Este, Yaquis de Obregón 2–1, Criollos de Caguas, Caribes de Anzoátequi 1–2.

==== Basketball ====
- PBA Philippine Cup finals (best-of-7 series):
  - Game 6 in Quezon City: Talk 'N Text Tropang Texters 95, San Miguel Beermen 82. **Talk 'N Text win series 4–2.**
    - Talk 'N Text win the championship for the third time.

==== Biathlon ====
- World Cup 7 in Presque Isle, United States:
  - Men's 10 km Sprint: (gold) Arnd Peiffer (GER) 25:28.8 (0+0) (silver) Martin Fourcade (FRA) 25:44.7 (0+1) (bronze) Ivan Tcherezov (RUS) 26:05.2 (0+0)
    - Sprint standings (after 7 of 10 races): (1) Tarjei Bø (NOR) 297 points (2) Peiffer 239 (3) Emil Hegle Svendsen (NOR) 231
    - Overall standings (after 15 of 26 races): (1) Bø 641 points (2) Svendsen 592 (3) Fourcade 531
  - Women's 7.5 km Sprint: (gold) Helena Ekholm (SWE) 20:38.7 (0+0) (silver) Tora Berger (NOR) 20:47.5 (0+1) (bronze) Valj Semerenko (UKR) 20:58.1 (0+0)
    - Sprint standings (after 7 of 10 races): (1) Kaisa Mäkäräinen (FIN) 281 points (2) Ekholm 262 (3) Anastasiya Kuzmina (SVK) 237
    - Overall standings (after 15 of 26 races): (1) Ekholm 606 points (2) Mäkäräinen 592 (3) Andrea Henkel (GER) 539

==== Cross-country skiing ====
- World Cup in Rybinsk, Russia:
  - Men's 20 km Pursuit: (gold) Ilia Chernousov (RUS) 48:54.2 (silver) Jean-Marc Gaillard (FRA) 48:54.6 (bronze) Maurice Manificat (FRA) 48:57.2
    - Distance standings (after 13 of 17 races): (1) Dario Cologna (SUI) 481 points (2) Alexander Legkov (RUS) 447 (3) Lukáš Bauer (CZE) 400
    - Overall standings (after 22 of 31 races): (1) Cologna 1197 points (2) Petter Northug (NOR) 774 (3) Bauer 698
  - Women's 10 km Pursuit: (gold) Justyna Kowalczyk (POL) 27:04.2 (silver) Marianna Longa (ITA) 27:14.0 (bronze) Aino-Kaisa Saarinen (FIN) 27:24.8
    - Distance standings (after 13 of 17 races): (1) Kowalczyk 787 points (2) Marit Bjørgen (NOR) 510 (3) Longa 441
    - Overall standings (after 22 of 31 races): (1) Kowalczyk 1516 points (2) Arianna Follis (ITA) 930 (3) Bjørgen 922

==== Football (soccer) ====
- OFC Champions League Group stage, matchday 4:
  - Group B: AS Tefana (French Polynesia) 3–1 (New Zealand) Waitakere United
    - Standings: (New Zealand) Auckland City 5 points (3 matches), Waitakere United 5 (4), AS Tefana 4 (4), (New Caledonia) AS Magenta 4 (3).

==== Freestyle skiing ====
- World Championships in Deer Valley and Park City, United States:
  - Men's Ski Cross: (gold) Christopher Del Bosco (CAN) (silver) Jouni Pellinen (FIN) (bronze) Andreas Matt (AUT)
    - Del Bosco wins his first world title.
  - Women's Ski Cross: (gold) Kelsey Serwa (CAN) (silver) Julia Murray (CAN) (bronze) Anna Holmlund (SWE)
    - Serwa wins her first world title.
  - Men's Aerials: (gold) Warren Shouldice (CAN) 253.66 points (silver) Qi Guangpu (CHN) 250.95 (bronze) Anton Kushnir (BLR) 249.63
    - Shouldice wins his first world title.
  - Women's Aerials: (gold) Cheng Shuang (CHN) 188.40 points (silver) Xu Mengtao (CHN) 188.23 (bronze) Olha Volkova (UKR) 178.59
    - Cheng wins her first world title.

==== Rugby union ====
- Six Nations Championship, week 1:
  - Wales 19–26 England in Cardiff

==== Skeleton ====
- World Cup in Cesana, Italy:
  - Men: (gold) Martins Dukurs (LAT) 1:53.06 (56.39 / 56.67) (silver) Tomass Dukurs (LAT) 1:54.27 (56.99 / 57.28) (bronze) Sandro Stielicke (GER) 1:54.32 (57.10 / 57.22)
    - Final standings: (1) Martins Dukurs 1719 points (2) Stielicke 1466 (3) Frank Rommel (GER) 1410
      - Martins Dukurs wins the title for the second successive time.
  - Women: (gold) Anja Huber (GER) 1:56.71 (58.35 / 58.36) (silver) Marion Thees (GER) 1:56.77 (58.46 / 58.31) (bronze) Darla Deschamps (CAN) 1:57.07 (58.48 / 58.59)
    - Final standings: (1) Huber 1710 points (2) Shelley Rudman (GBR) 1642 (3) Mellisa Hollingsworth (CAN) 1516
      - Huber wins her first World Cup title.

==== Snooker ====
- German Masters in Berlin, Germany:
  - Last 32:
    - **John Higgins** (SCO) 5–3 Robert Milkins (ENG)
    - **Mark Williams** (WAL) 5–1 Anthony McGill (SCO)
    - Mark King (ENG) 1–5 **Marco Fu** (HKG)
    - **Stephen Maguire** (SCO) 5–2 Daniel Wells (WAL)
  - Last 16:
    - Anthony Hamilton (ENG) 2–5 **Graeme Dott** (SCO)
    - **Mark Selby** (ENG) 5–3 Stephen Hendry (SCO)
    - Peter Ebdon (ENG) 2–5 **Ding Junhui** (CHN)
    - Shaun Murphy (ENG) 2–5 **Joe Swail** (NIR)
    - Ricky Walden (ENG) 0–5 **Maguire**
    - **Williams** 5–2 Dominic Dale (WAL)
    - **Joe Perry** (ENG) 5–1 Ali Carter (ENG)
    - Higgins w/d–w/o **Fu**
      - Higgins withdraws after his father's death.

=== February 3, 2011 (Thursday) ===
==== Baseball ====
- Caribbean Series in Mayagüez, Puerto Rico:
  - (Dominican Republic) Toros del Este 6, (Venezuela) Caribes de Anzoátegui 5
  - (Puerto Rico) Criollos de Caguas 7, (Mexico) Yaquis de Obregón 3
    - Standings (after 2 games): Toros del Este, Criollos de Caguas, Yaquis de Obregón, Caribes de Anzoátequi 1–1.

==== Basketball ====
- Euroleague Top 16, matchday 3:
  - Group E:
    - Caja Laboral (Spain) 77–70 (Greece) Panathinaikos Athens
    - Unicaja Málaga (Spain) 98–91 (Lithuania) Lietuvos Rytas
      - Standings (after 3 games): Caja Laboral, Panathinaikos Athens 2–1; Unicaja Málaga, Lietuvos Rytas 1–2.
  - Group F:
    - Maccabi Tel Aviv (Israel) 104–67 (Slovenia) Union Olimpija Ljubljana
    - Regal FC Barcelona (Spain) 80–56 (Italy) Virtus Roma
      - Standings (after 3 games): Regal FC Barcelona 3–0; Maccabi Tel Aviv 2–1; Union Olimpija Ljubljana 1–2; Virtus Roma 0–3.
  - Group G:
    - Real Madrid (Spain) 89–86 (OT) (Turkey) Efes Pilsen Istanbul
    - Partizan Belgrade (Serbia) 58–66 (Italy) Montepaschi Siena
      - Standings (after 3 games): Real Madrid 3–0; Efes Pilsen 2–1; Montepaschi Siena 1–2; Partizan Belgrade 0–3.

==== Cricket ====
- Pakistan in New Zealand:
  - 5th ODI in Hamilton: Pakistan 268/9 (50 overs; Ahmed Shehzad 115); New Zealand 227 (46.5 overs). **Pakistan win by 41 runs; lead 6-match series 3–1.**
- West Indies in Sri Lanka:
  - 2nd ODI in Colombo: West Indies 203 (50 overs); Sri Lanka 199/2 (42.3/47 overs; Upul Tharanga 101*). **Sri Lanka win by 8 wickets (D/L); lead 3-match series 1–0.**

==== Football (soccer) ====
- South American Youth Championship in Peru:
  - Final stage, matchday 2:
    - Uruguay 1–1 Ecuador
    - Chile 2–3 Argentina
    - Brazil 2–0 Colombia
      - Standings (after 2 matches): Brazil 6 points, Ecuador, Uruguay 4, Argentina 3, Colombia, Chile 0.
- Copa Libertadores First Stage, second leg (first leg score in parentheses):
  - Deportivo Petare (Venezuela) 1–1 (0–1) (Paraguay) **Cerro Porteño**. Cerro Porteño win 4–1 on points.
  - **Unión Española** (Chile) 0–0 (1–0) (Bolivia) Bolívar. Unión Española win 4–1 on points.

==== Freestyle skiing ====
- World Championships in Deer Valley and Park City, United States:
  - Men's slopestyle: (gold) Alex Schlopy (USA) 41.8 points (silver) Sammy Carlson (USA) 41.5 (bronze) Russ Henshaw (AUS) 41.2
  - Women's slopestyle: (gold) Anna Segal (AUS) 43.4 points (silver) Kaya Turski (CAN) 41.7 (bronze) Keri Herman (USA) 41.0

==== Snooker ====
- German Masters in Berlin, Germany:
  - Wild-card round:
    - Liu Song (CHN) 2–5 **Daniel Wells** (WAL)
    - **Robert Milkins** (ENG) 5–1 Lasse Münstermann (GER)
  - Last 32:
    - **Ding Junhui** (CHN) 5–1 Matthew Stevens (WAL)
    - **Stephen Hendry** (SCO) 5–2 Judd Trump (ENG)
    - **Mark Selby** (ENG) 5–1 Nigel Bond (ENG)
    - **Graeme Dott** (SCO) 5–1 Thanawat Thirapongpaiboon (THA)
    - Mark Allen (NIR) 3–5 **Joe Swail** (NIR)
    - **Peter Ebdon** (ENG) 5–3 Andrew Higginson (ENG)
    - Neil Robertson (AUS) 4–5 **Anthony Hamilton** (ENG)
    - **Shaun Murphy** (ENG) 5–3 Ryan Day (WAL)
    - **Ricky Walden** (ENG) 5–2 Jack Lisowski (ENG)
    - **Ali Carter** (ENG) 5–4 Stephen Lee (ENG)
    - Jamie Cope (ENG) 3–5 **Joe Perry** (ENG)

=== February 2, 2011 (Wednesday) ===
==== Baseball ====
- Caribbean Series in Mayagüez, Puerto Rico:
  - (Mexico) Yaquis de Obregón 4, (Dominican Republic) Toros del Este 3 (15 innings)
  - (Venezuela) Caribes de Anzoátegui 5, (Puerto Rico) Criollos de Caguas 3

==== Basketball ====
- PBA Philippine Cup finals (best-of-7 series):
  - Game 5 in Quezon City: Talk 'N Text Tropang Texters 99, San Miguel Beermen 77. Talk 'N Text lead series 3–2.
- Euroleague Top 16, matchday 3:
  - Group H:
    - Fenerbahçe Ülker (Turkey) 80–72 (Lithuania) Žalgiris Kaunas
    - Olympiacos Piraeus (Greece) 77–62 (Spain) Power Electronics Valencia
      - Standings (after 3 games): Fenerbahçe Ülker 3–0; Olympiacos Piraeus 2–1; Power Electronics Valencia 1–2; Žalgiris Kaunas 0–3.

==== Cricket ====
- England in Australia:
  - 6th ODI in Sydney: England 333/6 (50 overs; Jonathan Trott 137); Australia 334/8 (49.2 overs). **Australia win by 2 wickets; lead 7-match series 5–1.**
    - Australia make their highest successful run chase, after England record their highest score against Australia.

==== Football (soccer) ====
- Copa Libertadores First Stage, second leg (first leg score in parentheses):
  - **Deportes Tolima** (Colombia) 2–0 (0–0) (Brazil) Corinthians. Deportes Tolima win 4–1 on points.
  - **Grêmio** (Brazil) 3–1 (2–2) (Uruguay) Liverpool. Grêmio win 4–1 on points.

==== Freestyle skiing ====
- World Championships in Deer Valley and Park City, United States:
  - Men's Moguls: (gold) Guilbaut Colas (FRA) 26.26 points (silver) Alexandre Bilodeau (CAN) 25.66 (bronze) Mikaël Kingsbury (CAN) 25.57
    - Colas wins his first world title.
  - Women's Moguls: (gold) Jennifer Heil (CAN) 24.35 points (silver) Hannah Kearney (USA) 24.31 (bronze) Kristi Richards (CAN) 23.71
    - Heil wins her first moguls world title, and third overall.

==== Ski jumping ====
- World Cup in Klingenthal, Germany:
  - HS 140: (gold) Kamil Stoch (POL) 264.6 points (silver) Thomas Morgenstern (AUT) 264.0 (bronze) Simon Ammann (SUI) 263.3
    - Standings (after 20 of 26 events): (1) Morgenstern 1514 points (2) Ammann 1073 (3) Andreas Kofler (AUT) 980

==== Snooker ====
- German Masters in Berlin, Germany, wild-card round:
  - **Anthony Hamilton** (ENG) 5–1 Pavel Leyk (GER)
  - **Thanawat Thirapongpaiboon** (THA) 5–3 Tomasz Skalski (BEL)
  - **Jack Lisowski** (ENG) 5–2 Luca Brecel (BEL)
  - **Nigel Bond** (ENG) 5–2 Stefan Kasper (GER)
  - **Joe Swail** (NIR) 5–0 Hans Blanckaert (BEL)

=== February 1, 2011 (Tuesday) ===
==== Cricket ====
- Pakistan in New Zealand:
  - 4th ODI in Napier: New Zealand 262/7 (50 overs); Pakistan 264/8 (49 overs). **Pakistan win by 2 wickets; lead 6-match series 2–1.**

==== Football (soccer) ====
- Copa Libertadores First Stage, second leg (first leg score in parentheses):
  - Deportivo Quito (Ecuador) 1–0 (0–2) (Argentina) **Independiente**. 3–3 on points; Independiente win 2–1 on aggregate.
  - **Jaguares** (Mexico) 2–0 (2–0) (Peru) Alianza Lima. Jaguares win 6–0 on points.
