= Kristin Steinert =

German bobsledder (born 1987)

Personal information
- Born: 3 September 1987 (age 38)
- Height: 1.72 m (5 ft 7 1/2 in)
- Weight: 79 kg (174 lb; 12.4 st)

Sport
- Country: Germany
- Sport: Bobsleigh
- Turned pro: 2009
Medal record
World Championships
Silver medal – second place	2011 Königssee	Mixed team

Kristin Steinert (born 3 September 1987) is a German bobsledder who has competed since 2009. Her best World Cup finish was third in the two-woman events at Lake Placid in December 2010.

She won silver at the 2011 FIBT World Championships in Königssee in the mixed team event.
