= Kazakhstan at the 2000 Summer Olympics =

- IOC code: KAZ
- NOC: National Olympic Committee of the Republic of Kazakhstan
- Website: www.olympic.kz (in Kazakh, Russian, and English)

in Sydney
- Competitors: 130 (86 men and 44 women) in 17 sports
- Flag bearer: Yermakhan Ibraimov
- Medals Ranked 22nd: Gold 3 Silver 4 Bronze 0 Total 7

Summer Olympics appearances (overview)
- 1996; 2000; 2004; 2008; 2012; 2016; 2020; 2024

Other related appearances
- Russian Empire (1900–1912); Soviet Union (1952–1988); Unified Team (1992)

Kazakhstan competed at the 2000 Summer Olympics in Sydney, Australia. 130 competitors, 86 men and 44 women, took part in 104 events in 17 sports.

== Medalists ==
Medal	Name	Sport	Event
Gold	Olga Shishigina	Athletics	Women's 100 metres hurdles
Gold	Bekzat Sattarkhanov	Boxing	Men's featherweight
Gold	Yermakhan Ibraimov	Boxing	Men's light-middleweight
Silver	Mukhtarkhan Dildabekov	Boxing	Men's super heavyweight
Silver	Bulat Jumadilov	Boxing	Men's flyweight
Silver	Alexander Vinokourov	Cycling	Men's road race
Silver	Islam Bairamukov	Wrestling	Men's freestyle 97 kg

== Archery ==
Athlete	Event	Ranking round		Round of 64	Round of 32	Round of 16	Quarterfinals	Semifinals	Final / BM	
Athlete	Event	Score	Seed	Opposition Score	Opposition Score	Opposition Score	Opposition Score	Opposition Score	Opposition Score	Rank
Aleksandr Li	Men's individual	635	15	Makiyama (JPN); L 150–151	Did not advance					
Vadim Shikarev	Men's individual	632	23	M Eriksson (SWE); W 158–156	Hendrickx (BEL); W 154–151	Wunderle (USA); L 166–171	Did not advance			
Stanislav Zabrodsky	Men's individual	649	5	Sayed (EGY); W 166–149	N Eriksson (SWE); W 163–146	van Alten (NED); L 164–166	Did not advance			
Aleksandr Li; Vadim Shikarev; Stanislav Zabrodsky	Men's team	1916	3	—N/a		Norway; W 246–241	Italy; L 244–249	Did not advance		
Yelena Plotnikova	Women's individual	623	37	Łęcka (POL); L 149–163	Did not advance					

== Athletics ==
Men
Track and road events

Athlete	Event	Heat		Quarterfinal		Semifinal		Final	
Athlete	Event	Time	Rank	Time	Rank	Time	Rank	Time	Rank
Vitaly Medvedev	100 m	10.75	74	Did not advance					
Gennadiy Chernovol	200 m	20.95	34	Did not advance					
Valeriy Borisov	20 km walk	—N/a						1:28:36	38
Valeriy Borisov	50 km walk	—N/a						4:01:11	25
Sergey Korepanov	50 km walk	—N/a						3:53:30	15

Field events

Athlete	Event	Qualification		Final	
Athlete	Event	Result	Rank	Result	Rank
Yuriy Pakhlyayev	High jump	2.24	19	Did not advance	
Igor Potapovich	Pole vault	NM		Did not advance	
Sergey Arzamasov	Triple jump	16.70	15	Did not advance	
Oleg Sakirkin	Triple jump	16.20	28	Did not advance	
Sergey Rubtsov	Shot put	15.90	37	Did not advance	

Women
Track and road events

Athlete	Event	Heat		Quarterfinal		Semifinal		Final	
Athlete	Event	Time	Rank	Time	Rank	Time	Rank	Time	Rank
Viktoriya Kovyreva	100 m	11.72	49	Did not advance					
Svetlana Bodritskaya	400 m	53.91	40	Did not advance					
Garifa Kuku	Marathon	—N/a						DNF	
Olga Shishigina	100 m hurdles	12.81	3 Q	12.66	1 Q	12.71	3 Q	12.65	1st place, gold medalist(s)
Natalya Torshina	400 m hurdles	56.38	15 q	—N/a		56.22	15	Did not advance	
Yelena Kuznetsova	20 km walk	—N/a						1:42:45	40
Maya Sazonova	20 km walk	—N/a						DNF	
Svetlana Tolstaya	20 km walk	—N/a						1:35:19	21

Field events

Athlete	Event	Qualification		Final	
Athlete	Event	Result	Rank	Result	Rank
Svetlana Zalevskaya	High jump	1.94	1 Q	1.96	6
Yelena Koshcheyeva	Long jump	6.57	13	Did not advance	
Yelena Pershina	Long jump	6.24	28	Did not advance	
Anna Tarasova	Long jump	NM		Did not advance	
Yelena Parfyonova	Triple jump	13.50	21	Did not advance	
Anna Tarasova	Triple jump	13.11	27	Did not advance	
Iolanta Ulyeva	Shot put	16.38	21	Did not advance	

Combined events – Heptathlon

Athlete	Event	100H	HJ	SP	200 m	LJ	JT	800 m	Final	Rank
Svetlana Kazanina	Event	14.71	1.75	12.97	25.04	5.84	43.53	2:10.45	5898	16
Svetlana Kazanina	Points	880	916	725	883	801	735	958	5898	16
Irina Naumenko	Event	14.26	1.84	11.26	25.19	5.88	32.53	2:18.49	5634	21
Irina Naumenko	Points	942	1029	612	869	813	525	844	5634	21

== Boxing ==
Athlete	Event	Round of 32	Round of 16	Quarterfinal	Semifinal	Final	
Athlete	Event	Opposition Result	Opposition Result	Opposition Result	Opposition Result	Opposition Result	Rank
Bulat Zhumadilov	Flyweight	Bye	Kanyanta (ZAM); W 12–9	Darchinyan (ARM); W 15–8	Thomas (FRA); W 22–16	Ponlid (THA); L 12–19	2nd place, silver medalist(s)
Bekzat Sattarkhanov	Featherweight	Bobîrnat (ROU); W 14–5	Mathebula (RSA); W 16–5	Paliani (TUR); W 12–11	Tamsamani (MAR); W 22–10	Juarez (USA); W 22–14	1st place, gold medalist(s)
Nurzhan Karimzhanov	Lightweight	Gevorgyan (ARM); W 16–6	Katsidis (AUS); W 9–7	Kotelnyk (UKR); L RSC R3	Did not advance		
Daniyar Munaytbasov	Welterweight	Nuumbembe (NAM); W 14–2	Bundu (ITA); W 13–4	Dotsenko (UKR); L 7–8	Did not advance		
Yermakhan Ibraimov	Light middleweight	Massas (SYR); W RSC R3	Yánes (VEN); W RSC R3	Hernández (CUB); W 16–9	Taylor (USA); W RSC R4	Simion (ROU); W 25–23	1st place, gold medalist(s)
Olzhas Orazaliyev	Light heavyweight	Garay (ARG); W RSC R4	Álvarez (CUB); W RSC R3	Mihaylov (UZB); L RSC R4	Did not advance		
Mukhtarkhan Dildabekov	Super heavyweight	—N/a	Kiełsa (POL); W 16–5	Rubalcaba (CUB); W 25–12	Saidov (UZB); W 28–22	Harrison (GBR); L 16–30	2nd place, silver medalist(s)

== Canoeing ==
=== Sprint ===
Athlete	Event	Heat		Semifinal		Final	
Athlete	Event	Time	Rank	Time	Rank	Time	Rank
Kaisar Nurmaganbetov	Men's C-1 500 m	1:55.422	8 SF	1:54.465	6	Did not advance	
Kaisar Nurmaganbetov	Men's C-1 1000 m	4:01.438	8 SF	4:05.206	7	Did not advance	
Zhomart Satubaldin; Konstantin Negodyayev	Men's C-2 500 m	1:45.810	4 SF	1:45.809	3 F	2:01.436	7
Zhomart Satubaldin; Konstantin Negodyayev	Men's C-2 1000 m	3:53.366	7 SF	3:48.756	7	Did not advance	
Sergey Sergin	Men's K-1 500 m	1:47.253	7	Did not advance			
Sergey Sergin	Men's K-1 1000 m	3:42.645	7 SF	3:47.633	8	Did not advance	

== Cycling ==
=== Road ===
Athlete	Event	Time	Rank
Andrey Kivilev	Men's road race	5:30:46	72
Alexandr Shefer	Men's road race	5:30:46	52
Andrey Teteryuk	Men's road race	5:30:46	45
Alexander Vinokourov	Men's road race	5:29:17	2nd place, silver medalist(s)
Sergei Yakovlev	Men's road race	5:30:46	56
Andrey Teteryuk	Men's time trial	58:52.342	6
Alexander Vinokourov	Men's time trial	1:01:34.259	27

=== Track ===
Pursuit

Athlete	Event	Qualifying		Quarterfinal		Semifinal		Final / BM	
Athlete	Event	Time	Rank	Opposition Time	Rank	Opposition Time	Rank	Opposition Time	Rank
Vadim Kravchenko	Men's individual pursuit	4:40.410	17	Did not advance					

Points race

Athlete	Event	Laps behind	Points	Rank
Sergey Lavrenenko	Men's points race	2	1	20

== Diving ==
Athlete	Event	Preliminary		Semifinal				Final		Total	
Athlete	Event	Points	Rank	Points	Rank	Total	Rank	Points	Rank	Points	Rank
Alisher Seitov	Men's 3 m springboard	307.62	42	Did not advance							
Damir Akhmetbekov	Men's 10 m platform	75.42	41	Did not advance							
Alexey Gurman	Men's 10 m platform	320.13	31	Did not advance							
Natalya Popova	Women's 3 m springboard	234.90	28	Did not advance							
Irina Vyguzova	Women's 3 m springboard	303.30	6 Q	217.47	11	520.77	6 Q	310.86	8	528.33	9
Natalya Chikina	Women's 10 m platform	296.58	10 Q	162.27	14	296.58	12 Q	304.53	9	466.80	9
Irina Vyguzova	Women's 10 m platform	284.52	14 Q	157.17	16	441.69	15	Did not advance			

== Fencing ==
Athlete	Event	Round of 64	Round of 32	Round of 16	Quarterfinal	Semifinal	Final / BM	
Athlete	Event	Opposition Result	Opposition Result	Opposition Result	Opposition Result	Opposition Result	Opposition Result	Rank
Andrey Kolganov	Men's foil	Marsi (HUN); L 13–15	Did not advance					
Sergey Shabalin	Men's épée	Switak (AUT); L 13–14	Did not advance					
Igor Tsel	Men's sabre	Smart (USA); L 5–15	Did not advance					
Nelya Sevostiyanova	Women's foil	Yuan (CHN); L 3–15	Did not advance					
Natalya Goncharova	Women's épée	Aznavourian (RUS); L 13–15	Did not advance					

== Gymnastics ==
=== Men ===
Athlete	Event	Qualification								Final							
Athlete	Event	Apparatus						Total	Rank	Apparatus						Total	Rank
Athlete	Event	F	PH	R	V	PB	HB	Total	Rank	F	PH	R	V	PB	HB	Total	Rank
Sergey Fedorchenko	All-around	—N/a	9.662	—N/a	9.775	—N/a	9.725	29.162	81	Did not advance							
Sergey Fedorchenko	Vault	—N/a			9.775	—N/a		9.775	2 Q	—N/a			9.399	—N/a		9.399	5

=== Women ===
Athlete	Event	Qualification						Final					
Athlete	Event	Apparatus				Total	Rank	Apparatus				Total	Rank
Athlete	Event	V	UB	BB	F	Total	Rank	V	UB	BB	F	Total	Rank
Irina Yevdokimova	All-around	9.131	9.062	9.037	9.187	36.417	46	Did not advance					

== Judo ==
Men

Athlete	Event	Round of 64	Round of 32	Round of 16	Quarterfinal	Semifinal	Repechage 1	Repechage 2	Repechage 3	Repechage 4	Final / BM	
Athlete	Event	Opposition Result	Opposition Result	Opposition Result	Opposition Result	Opposition Result	Opposition Result	Opposition Result	Opposition Result	Opposition Result	Opposition Result	Rank
Bazarbek Donbay	–60 kg	Bye	Gussenberg (GER); W 1100–0010	Peñas (ESP); W 0110–0010	Jung (KOR); L 0000–1001	Did not advance	—N/a		Khergiani (GEO); W 0110–0010	Ismayilov (AZE); W 0100–0001	Poulot (CUB); L 0000–0210	5
Ivan Baglayev	–66 kg	Bye	Cameroun (CMR); W 1000–0011	Matsiev (RUS); W 1000–0011	van Kalken (NED); L 0010–1000	Did not advance	—N/a		Nakamura (JPN); L 0000–1010	Did not advance		
Askhat Shakharov	–73 kg	Bye	Makarov (RUS); W 1010–0011	Bilodid (UKR); L 0010–0222	Did not advance							
Ruslan Seilkhanov	–81 kg	Bye	Takimoto (JPN); L 0010–0210	Did not advance			—N/a	García (ARG); W 1001–0111	Paseyro (URU); L 0001–1001	Did not advance		
Sergey Shakimov	–90 kg	—N/a	Yoshida (JPN); L 0002–0012	Did not advance								
Askhat Zhitkeyev	–100 kg	Bye	Kovács (HUN); L 0011–0200	Did not advance								
Vyacheslav Berduta	+100 kg	Bye	Vásquez (DOM); W 1001–0000	Shinohara (JPN); L 0010–1001	Did not advance		—N/a	Sharapov (BLR); L 0000–1001	Did not advance			

Women

Athlete	Event	Round of 32	Round of 16	Quarterfinals	Semifinals	Repechage 1	Repechage 2	Repechage 3	Final / BM	
Athlete	Event	Opposition Result	Opposition Result	Opposition Result	Opposition Result	Opposition Result	Opposition Result	Opposition Result	Opposition Result	Rank
Gulnara Kusherbayeva	+78 kg	Rodina (RUS); L 0000–0201	Did not advance							

== Rowing ==
Athlete	Event	Heat		Repechage		Semifinal		Final	
Athlete	Event	Time	Rank	Time	Rank	Time	Rank	Time	Rank
Vladimir Belonogov	Men's single sculls	7:34.66	6 R	7:36.42	6 SC/D	7:24.44	3 FC	7:21.44	16

== Shooting ==
Athlete	Event	Qualification		Final		Total	
Athlete	Event	Points	Rank	Points	Rank	Points	Rank
Vladimir Gushcha	Men's 50 m pistol	562	7 Q	93.8	8	655.8	8
Vladimir Gushcha	Men's 10 m air pistol	574	23	Did not advance			
Vladimir Vokhmyanin	Men's 25 m rapid fire pistol	580	12	Did not advance			
Sergey Yakshin	Men's skeet	24	7	Did not advance			
Dina Aspandiyarova	Women's 25 m pistol	572	28	Did not advance			
Dina Aspandiyarova	Women's 10 m air pistol	388	2 Q	95.7	8	483.7	6
Yuliya Bondareva	Women's 25 m pistol	579	11	Did not advance			
Yuliya Bondareva	Women's 10 m air pistol	382	9	Did not advance			
Olga Dovgun	Women's 50 m rifle three positions	583	5 Q	91.2	8	674.2	7
Olga Dovgun	Women's 10 m air rifle	391	20	Did not advance			

== Swimming ==
Men

Athlete	Event	Heat		Semifinal		Final	
Athlete	Event	Time	Rank	Time	Rank	Time	Rank
Sergey Borisenko	50 m freestyle	23.46	42	Did not advance			
Andrey Gavrilov	100 m butterfly	56.14	49	Did not advance			
Andrey Kvassov	200 m freestyle	1:55.72	48	Did not advance			
Grigoriy Matuzkov	200 m individual medley	2:05.45	29	Did not advance			
Grigoriy Matuzkov	400 m individual medley	4:31.89	39	—N/a		Did not advance	
Alexandr Savitskiy	100 m breaststroke	1:05.95	54	Did not advance			
Pavel Sidorov	100 m backstroke	1:01.02	52	Did not advance			
Igor Sitnikov	100 m freestyle	52.57	53	Did not advance			
Sergey Borisenko; Andrey Kvassov; Pavel Sidorov; Igor Sitnikov	4 × 100 m freestyle relay	3:28.90	21	—N/a		Did not advance	

Women

Athlete	Event	Heat		Semifinal		Final	
Athlete	Event	Time	Rank	Time	Rank	Time	Rank
Marina Mulyayeva	200 m individual medley	2:22.72	28	Did not advance			

== Synchronized swimming ==
Athlete	Event	Technical routine		Free routine (preliminary)				Free routine (final)		Total	
Athlete	Event	Points	Rank	Points	Rank	Total	Rank	Points	Rank	Points	Rank
Aliya Karimova; Galina Shatnaya	Duet	83.200	22	83.467	21	83.374	22	Did not advance			

== Triathlon ==
Athlete	Event	Swim	Trans. 1	Cycle	Trans. 2	Run	Total	Rank
Dmitriy Gaag	Men's	17:49.39	23.70	58:49.70	18.30	31:42.48	1:49:03.57	4
Mikhail Kuznetsov	Men's	18:28.89	26.20	1:04:17.70	21.50	35:39.21	1:59:13.50	47

== Water polo ==
Summary

Team	Event	Group stage						Classification round			Final / BM / Pl.	
Team	Event	Opposition Score	Opposition Score	Opposition Score	Opposition Score	Opposition Score	Rank	Opposition Score	Opposition Score	Opposition Score	Opposition Score	Rank
Kazakhstan men	Men's tournament	Spain; L 7–8	Australia; D 11–11	Russia; L 7–9	Slovakia; W 9–5	Italy; L 7–13	5	Classification round 9th-12th place Greece; D 6–6	Classification round 9th-12th place Slovakia; W 11–8	Classification round 9th-12th place Netherlands; W 6–4	—N/a	9
Kazakhstan women	Women's tournament	Australia; L 2–9	Netherlands; L 6–8	Canada; L 3–10	Russia; L 6–15	United States; L 6–9	6	—N/a			5th place match Canada; L 8–9	6

=== Men's tournament ===
Team roster
- Roman Chentsov
- Konstantin Chernov
- Sergey Drozdov
- Aleksandr Yelke
- Askar Orazalinov
- Yevgeny Prokhin
- Artemy Sevostyanov
- Aleksandr Shvedov
- Igor Zagoruykov
- Ivan Zaytsev
- Yevgeny Zhilyayev
- Denis Zhivchikov

Preliminary round Group A

Pos	Team	Pld	W	D	L	GF	GA	GD	Pts	Qualification
1	Russia	5	4	1	0	51	28	+23	9	Quarter Finals
2	Italy	5	4	1	0	43	32	+11	9	Quarter Finals
3	Spain	5	2	1	2	32	34	−2	5	Quarter Finals
4	Australia (H)	5	1	2	2	38	36	+2	4	Quarter Finals
5	Kazakhstan	5	1	1	3	41	46	−5	3	
6	Slovakia	5	0	0	5	30	59	−29	0	

Source: LA84
Rules for classification: 1) Points; 2) Head-to-head points; 3) Head-to-head goal difference; 4) Head-to-head goals scored; 5) Goal difference.
(H) Hosts

23 September 2000; 15:00	Kazakhstan	7–8	Spain	Ryde Aquatic Leisure Centre; Referees: Klaric (CRO), Margeta (SLO)
23 September 2000; 15:00	Score by quarters: 1-2, 3-2, 1-3, 2-1			Ryde Aquatic Leisure Centre; Referees: Klaric (CRO), Margeta (SLO)

24 September 2000; 20:30	Australia	11–11	Kazakhstan	Ryde Aquatic Leisure Centre; Referees: Ludecke (GER), Takata (USA)
24 September 2000; 20:30	Score by quarters: 2-4, 3-2, 4-3, 2-2			Ryde Aquatic Leisure Centre; Referees: Ludecke (GER), Takata (USA)

25 September 2000; 15:45	Kazakhstan	7–9	Russia	Ryde Aquatic Leisure Centre; Referees: Csaszar (HUN), Moradi Shahpar (IRI)
25 September 2000; 15:45	Score by quarters: 1-1, 1-4, 2-2, 3-2			Ryde Aquatic Leisure Centre; Referees: Csaszar (HUN), Moradi Shahpar (IRI)

26 September 2000; 15:45	Kazakhstan	9–5	Slovakia	Ryde Aquatic Leisure Centre; Referees: Rajevic (YUG), Mendendez Betancourt (CUB)
26 September 2000; 15:45	Score by quarters: 4-0, 1-0, 1-2, 3-3			Ryde Aquatic Leisure Centre; Referees: Rajevic (YUG), Mendendez Betancourt (CUB)

27 September 2000; 15:45	Italy	13–7	Kazakhstan	Ryde Aquatic Leisure Centre; Referees: Boyer (USA), Csaszar (HUN)
27 September 2000; 15:45	Score by quarters: 2-1, 2-1, 5-3, 4-2			Ryde Aquatic Leisure Centre; Referees: Boyer (USA), Csaszar (HUN)

Classification round 9th-12th place

Team	Pld	W	L	D	GF	GA	GD	Pts
Kazakhstan	3	2	0	1	23	18	+5	5
Greece	3	1	0	2	24	20	+4	4
Netherlands	3	1	1	1	19	20	-1	3
Slovakia	3	0	3	0	24	32	-8	0

29 September 2000; 09:30	Kazakhstan	6–6	Greece	Ryde Aquatic Leisure Centre; Referees: Schwartz (ISR), Menendez Betancourt (CUB)
29 September 2000; 09:30	Score by quarters: 0-3, 3-1, 1-2, 2-0			Ryde Aquatic Leisure Centre; Referees: Schwartz (ISR), Menendez Betancourt (CUB)

30 September 2000; 10:00	Kazakhstan	11–8	Slovakia	Ryde Aquatic Leisure Centre; Referees: Boyer (USA), Melliar (RSA)
30 September 2000; 10:00	Score by quarters: 4-1, 3-1, 2-2, 2-4			Ryde Aquatic Leisure Centre; Referees: Boyer (USA), Melliar (RSA)

1 October 2000; 10:15	Kazakhstan	6–4	Netherlands	Ryde Aquatic Leisure Centre; Referees: Menendez Betancourt (CUB), Margeta (SLO)
1 October 2000; 10:15	Score by quarters: 1-2, 2-0, 2-1, 1-1			Ryde Aquatic Leisure Centre; Referees: Menendez Betancourt (CUB), Margeta (SLO)

=== Women's tournament ===
Team roster
- Rezeda Aleyeva
- Anastasiya Boroda
- Irina Borodavko
- Svetlana Buravova
- Nataliya Galkina
- Yekaterina Gerzanich
- Tatyana Gubina
- Nataliya Ignatyeva
- Asel Dzhakayeva
- Svetlana Koroleva
- Olga Leshchuk
- Larisa Olkhina
- Yuliya Pyryseva

Preliminary round

Pos	Team	Pld	W	D	L	GF	GA	GD	Pts	Qualification
1	Australia (H)	5	4	0	1	35	20	+15	8	Semi Finals
2	United States	5	3	1	1	36	30	+6	7	Semi Finals
3	Netherlands	5	3	0	2	27	26	+1	6	Semi Finals
4	Russia	5	2	1	2	36	29	+7	5	Semi Finals
5	Canada	5	1	2	2	33	34	−1	4	
6	Kazakhstan	5	0	0	5	23	51	−28	0	

Source: LA84
Rules for classification: 1) Points; 2) Head-to-head points; 3) Head-to-head goal difference; 4) Head-to-head goals scored; 5) Goal difference.
(H) Hosts

16 September 2000; 13:00	Report	Kazakhstan	2–9	Australia	Ryde Aquatic Centre; Referees: Melliar (RSA), Rolf Ludecke (GER)
16 September 2000; 13:00	Report	Score by quarters: 1-2, 1-2, 0-1, 0-4			Ryde Aquatic Centre; Referees: Melliar (RSA), Rolf Ludecke (GER)
16 September 2000; 13:00	Report	two players 1	Goals	Gusterson 3	Ryde Aquatic Centre; Referees: Melliar (RSA), Rolf Ludecke (GER)

17 September 2000; 19:15	Report	Kazakhstan	6–8	Netherlands	Ryde Aquatic Centre; Referees: Dragan Rajevic (YUG), Juan Carlos Menéndez (CUB)
17 September 2000; 19:15	Report	Score by quarters: 2-2, 2-2, 1-2, 1-2			Ryde Aquatic Centre; Referees: Dragan Rajevic (YUG), Juan Carlos Menéndez (CUB)
17 September 2000; 19:15	Report	Leshchuk 3	Goals	two players 3	Ryde Aquatic Centre; Referees: Dragan Rajevic (YUG), Juan Carlos Menéndez (CUB)

18 September 2000; 19:15	Report	Canada	10–3	Kazakhstan	Ryde Aquatic Centre; Referees: Rolf Ludecke (GER), Vahid Moradi (IRI)
18 September 2000; 19:15	Report	Score by quarters: 3-1, 3-0, 1-2, 3-0			Ryde Aquatic Centre; Referees: Rolf Ludecke (GER), Vahid Moradi (IRI)
18 September 2000; 19:15	Report	four players 2	Goals	three players 1	Ryde Aquatic Centre; Referees: Rolf Ludecke (GER), Vahid Moradi (IRI)

19 September 2000; 18:00	Report	Kazakhstan	6–15	Russia	Ryde Aquatic Centre; Referees: Gad Schwartz (ISR), Vlastimil Kratochvil (SVK)
19 September 2000; 18:00	Report	Score by quarters: 1-5, 1-5, 3-3, 1-2			Ryde Aquatic Centre; Referees: Gad Schwartz (ISR), Vlastimil Kratochvil (SVK)
19 September 2000; 18:00	Report	Aleyeva 2	Goals	two players 3	Ryde Aquatic Centre; Referees: Gad Schwartz (ISR), Vlastimil Kratochvil (SVK)

20 September 2000; 19:15	Report	Kazakhstan	6–9	United States	Ryde Aquatic Centre; Referees: Zeljko Klaric (CRO), Vahid Moradi (IRI)
20 September 2000; 19:15	Report	Score by quarters: 1-2, 1-3, 2-3, 2-1			Ryde Aquatic Centre; Referees: Zeljko Klaric (CRO), Vahid Moradi (IRI)
20 September 2000; 19:15	Report	two players 2	Goals	Villa 4	Ryde Aquatic Centre; Referees: Zeljko Klaric (CRO), Vahid Moradi (IRI)

5th place match

22 September 2000; 18:00	Report	Canada	9–8 (OT)	Kazakhstan	Ryde Aquatic Centre; Referees: Andrew Jay Takata (USA), Phillip Bower (AUS)
22 September 2000; 18:00	Report	Score by quarters: 1-1, 3-3, 2-3, 2-1 OT: 1-0, 0–0			Ryde Aquatic Centre; Referees: Andrew Jay Takata (USA), Phillip Bower (AUS)
22 September 2000; 18:00	Report	four players 2	Goals	Pyryseva 3	Ryde Aquatic Centre; Referees: Andrew Jay Takata (USA), Phillip Bower (AUS)

== Weightlifting ==
Athlete	Event	Snatch		Clean & Jerk		Total	
Athlete	Event	Weight	Rank	Weight	Rank	Weight	Rank
Dmitriy Lomakin	Men's –62 kg	132.5	9	150.0	14	282.5	13
Sergey Filimonov	Men's –77 kg	167.5 OR	1	195.0	5	362.5	4
Andrey Makarov	Men's –94 kg	177.5	6	197.5	16	375.0	13
Slavik Nyu	Men's –94 kg	175.0	10	200.0	13	375.0	12
Anatoly Khrapaty	Men's –105 kg	DNF					
Tatyana Khromova	Women's –75 kg	110.0 OR	1	DNF			

== Wrestling ==
Key:

- TO – Victory by Fall.
- SP – Decision by technical superiority (10 points difference) – the loser with technical points
- ST – Decision by technical superiority (10 points difference) – the loser without technical points
- PP – Decision by Points – the loser with technical points.
- PO – Decision by Points – the loser without technical points.
- VA – Victory by injury.

Greco-Roman

Athlete	Event	Elimination pool				Quarterfinals	Semifinals	Final / BM	
Athlete	Event	Opposition Result	Opposition Result	Opposition Result	Rank	Opposition Result	Opposition Result	Opposition Result	Rank
Rakymzhan Asembekov	54 kg	Sim (KOR); L 1–3^{PP}	Jabłoński (POL); W 4–0^{TO}	—N/a	2	Did not advance			
Yuriy Melnichenko	58 kg	Kim (KOR); L 0–3^{PO}	Aripov (UZB); L 0–4^{PA}	—N/a	3	Did not advance			
Mkhitar Manukyan	63 kg	Marén (CUB); L 1–3^{PP}	Singh (IND); W 3–1^{PP}	Djakrir (ALG); W 4–0^{ST}	2	Did not advance			
Bakhtiyar Bayseitov	76 kg	Yli-Hannuksela (FIN); L 1–3^{PP}	Riemer (FRA); W 3–1^{PP}	—N/a	2	Did not advance			
Sergey Matviyenko	97 kg	Samurgashev (ARM); W 3–0^{PO}	Peña (CUB); L 0–3^{PO}	—N/a	1 Q	Ljungberg (SWE); L 0–3^{PO}	Did not advance	5th place bout Chkhaidze (GEO); L 1–3^{PP}	6

Freestyle

Athlete	Event	Elimination pool				Quarterfinals	Semifinals	Final / BM	
Athlete	Event	Opposition Result	Opposition Result	Opposition Result	Rank	Opposition Result	Opposition Result	Opposition Result	Rank
Maulen Mamyrov	54 kg	Achilov (UZB); W 3–1^{PP}	Zeiher (GER); W 3–1^{PP}	—N/a	1 Q	Kantoyeu (BLR); L 1–3^{PP}	Did not advance	5th place bout Zakharuk (UKR); L 1–3^{PP}	6
Abil Ibragimov	58 kg	Brands (USA); L 0–4^{TO}	Polychronidis (GRE); L 0–4^{TO}	—N/a	3	Did not advance			
Ruslan Veliyev	69 kg	Askarov (KGZ); L 1–3^{PP}	Johnston (AUS); L 0–4^{PA}	Demchenko (BLR); L 0–4^{PA}	3	Did not advance			
Gennadiy Laliyev	76 kg	Dorostkar (IRI); W 3–1^{PP}	Mönkhbayar (MGL); W 3–0^{PO}	—N/a	1 Q	Slay (USA); L 1–3^{PP}	Did not advance	5th place bout Khinchagov (UZB); W 4–0^{PA}	4
Magomed Kurugliyev	85 kg	Romero (CUB); L 0–3^{PO}	Abdou (CAN); W 3–1^{PP}	Samušonoks (LAT); L 1–3^{PP}	2	Did not advance			
Islam Bayramukov	97 kg	Magomedov (AZE); W 3–0^{PO}	Morales (CUB); L 0–3^{PO}	—N/a	1 Q	Bye	Garmulewicz (POL); W 3–0^{PO}	Murtazaliev (RUS); L 0–3^{PO}	2nd place, silver medalist(s)

== Notes ==
- Wallechinsky, David (2004). The Complete Book of the Summer Olympics (Athens 2004 Edition). Toronto, Canada. ISBN 1-894963-32-6.
- International Olympic Committee (2001). The Results. Retrieved 12 November 2005.
- Sydney Organising Committee for the Olympic Games (2001). Official Report of the XXVII Olympiad Volume 1: Preparing for the Games. Retrieved 20 November 2005.
- Sydney Organising Committee for the Olympic Games (2001). Official Report of the XXVII Olympiad Volume 2: Celebrating the Games. Retrieved 20 November 2005.
- Sydney Organising Committee for the Olympic Games (2001). The Results. Retrieved 20 November 2005.
- International Olympic Committee Web Site
