= Kazakhstan at the 2004 Summer Olympics =

- IOC code: KAZ
- NOC: National Olympic Committee of the Republic of Kazakhstan
- Website: www.olympic.kz (in Kazakh, Russian, and English)

in Athens
- Competitors: 114 in 17 sports
- Flag bearer: Askhat Zhitkeyev
- Medals Ranked 40th: Gold 1 Silver 4 Bronze 3 Total 8

Summer Olympics appearances (overview)
- 1996; 2000; 2004; 2008; 2012; 2016; 2020; 2024; 2028

Other related appearances
- Russian Empire (1900–1912); Soviet Union (1952–1988); Unified Team (1992)

Kazakhstan competed at the 2004 Summer Olympics in Athens, Greece, from 13 to 29 August 2004. This was the nation's third appearance at the Summer Olympics in the post-Soviet era.

National Olympic Committee of the Republic of Kazakhstan sent a total of 114 athletes to the Games, 71 men and 43 women, to compete in 17 sports. The nation's team size was roughly smaller by 16 athletes from Sydney, and had the third largest share of men in its Summer Olympic history. Water polo was the only team-based sport in which Kazakhstan had its representation in these Olympic games. Among the sports played by the athletes, Kazakhstan marked its official Olympic debut in rhythmic gymnastics.

Notable Kazakh athletes featured returning Olympic medalists Alexander Vinokourov in road cycling and Islam Bairamukov in men's freestyle wrestling. Grigoriy Yegorov made his official comeback for his second Olympic bid, since he won the bronze medal in the men's pole vault at the 1988 Summer Olympics in Seoul, representing the Soviet Union. Pistol shooter Galina Belyayeva was the oldest and most accomplished member of the team at age 55. Meanwhile, backstroke swimmer Anastassiya Prilepa set a historic milestone for the Kazakh team as the youngest ever athlete, aged 14, to compete at the Olympics.

Kazakhstan left Athens with a total of eight Olympic medals (one gold, four silver, and three bronze), finishing fortieth in the overall medal count. This was also the nation's poorest Olympic performance in history since the breakup of the Soviet Union, collecting only a single gold medal from welterweight boxer Bakhtiyar Artayev. Three of these medals were awarded each to the athletes in boxing and wrestling, including Artayev's illustrious gold, while Dmitriy Karpov added a second Olympic medal for Kazakhstan in track and field by claiming the bronze in men's decathlon.

Weightlifter Sergey Filimonov originally captured a bronze in the men's 77 kg class. On February 12, 2013, the International Olympic Committee stripped Russia's Oleg Perepetchenov of his 2004 Olympic medal after both probes were retested and showed traces of anabolic steroids, upgrading Filimonov's medal to silver.

== Medalists ==
Medal	Name	Sport	Event	Date
Gold	Bakhtiyar Artayev	Boxing	Men's welterweight	August 29
Silver	Sergey Filimonov	Weightlifting	Men's 77 kg	August 19
Silver	Georgiy Tsurtsumia	Wrestling	Men's Greco-Roman 120 kg	August 25
Silver	Gennady Golovkin	Boxing	Men's middleweight	August 28
Silver	Gennadiy Laliyev	Wrestling	Men's freestyle 74 kg	August 29
Bronze	Dmitriy Karpov	Athletics	Men's decathlon	August 24
Bronze	Mkhitar Manukyan	Wrestling	Men's Greco-Roman 66 kg	August 25
Bronze	Serik Yeleuov	Boxing	Men's lightweight	August 29

== Archery ==
Two Kazakh archers qualified each for the men's and women's individual archery.

Athlete	Event	Ranking round		Round of 64	Round of 32	Round of 16	Quarterfinals	Semifinals	Final / BM	
Athlete	Event	Score	Seed	Opposition Score	Opposition Score	Opposition Score	Opposition Score	Opposition Score	Opposition Score	Rank
Stanislav Zabrodskiy	Men's individual	651	29	Custers (NED); W 145–141	Park K-M (KOR); L 164 (19)–164 (20)	Did not advance				
Viktoriya Beloslydtseva	Women's individual	629	26	Bridger (AUS); W 150–145	Mospinek (POL); L 155–163	Did not advance				
Olga Pilipova	Women's individual	616	48	Folkard (GBR); L 128–139	Did not advance					

== Athletics ==
Kazakh athletes have so far achieved qualifying standards in the following athletics events (up to a maximum of 3 athletes in each event at the 'A' Standard, and 1 at the 'B' Standard).

Key

- Note–Ranks given for track events are within the athlete's heat only
- Q = Qualified for the next round
- q = Qualified for the next round as a fastest loser or, in field events, by position without achieving the qualifying target
- NR = National record
- N/A = Round not applicable for the event
- Bye = Athlete not required to compete in round

Men
Track & road events

Athlete	Event	Heat		Quarterfinal		Semifinal		Final	
Athlete	Event	Result	Rank	Result	Rank	Result	Rank	Result	Rank
Valeriy Borisov	20 km walk	—N/a						1:27:39	27
Gennadiy Chernovol	100 m	10.43	3 Q	10.42	7	Did not advance			
Mihail Kolganov	800 m	1:47.36	6	—N/a		Did not advance			
Sergey Korepanov	50 km walk	—N/a						3:59:33	20
Rustam Kuvatov	50 km walk	—N/a						4:13:40	37
Yevgeniy Meleshenko	400 m hurdles	49.43	5 q	—N/a		49.48	8	Did not advance	

Field events

Athlete	Event	Qualification		Final	
Athlete	Event	Distance	Position	Distance	Position
Roman Valiyev	Triple jump	NM	—	Did not advance	
Grigoriy Yegorov	Pole vault	NM	—	Did not advance	

Combined events – Decathlon

Athlete	Event	100 m	LJ	SP	HJ	400 m	110H	DT	PV	JT	1500 m	Final	Rank
Dmitriy Karpov	Result	10.50	7.81	15.93	2.09	46.81	13.97	51.65	4.60	55.54	4:38.11	8725 AS	3rd place, bronze medalist(s)
Dmitriy Karpov	Points	975	1012	847	887	968	978	905	790	671	692	8725 AS	3rd place, bronze medalist(s)

Women
Track & road events

Athlete	Event	Heat		Quarterfinal		Semifinal		Final	
Athlete	Event	Result	Rank	Result	Rank	Result	Rank	Result	Rank
Svetlana Bodritskaya	400 m	53.35	6	—N/a		Did not advance			
Viktoriya Koviyreva	100 m	11.62	5	Did not advance					
Yelena Kuznetsova	20 km walk	—N/a						1:49:08	50
Tatyana Roslanova	800 m	2:06.39	6	—N/a		Did not advance			
Svetlana Tolstaya	20 km walk	—N/a						1:34:43	28
Natalya Torshina-Alimzhanova	400 m hurdles	55.22	3 q	—N/a		55.08	5	Did not advance	

Field events

Athlete	Event	Qualification		Final	
Athlete	Event	Distance	Position	Distance	Position
Marina Aitova	High jump	1.85	=31	Did not advance	
Tatyana Bocharova	Triple jump	13.81	25	Did not advance	
Yelena Kashcheyeva	Long jump	6.57	11 q	6.53	11
Iolanta Ulyeva	Shot put	14.88	35	Did not advance	

Combined events – Heptathlon

Athlete	Event	100H	HJ	SP	200 m	LJ	JT	800 m	Final	Rank
Svetlana Kazanina	Result	14.99	1.70	12.38	26.31	NM	39.92	DNS	DNF	
Svetlana Kazanina	Points	843	855	686	770	0	666	0	DNF	
Irina Naumenko	Result	14.16	1.79	12.95	24.88	6.16	39.50	2:14.57	6000	22
Irina Naumenko	Points	956	966	724	898	899	658	899	6000	22

== Boxing ==
Kazakhstan sent eight boxers to the 2004 Olympics. Each of them won at least one bout, a feat that not even Cuba accomplished. Three of the Kazakhstani boxers won medals, one each of gold, silver, and bronze. This put Kazakhstan in a tie with Thailand for third place in the boxing medals count, behind only Cuba and Russia. Russia was a constant annoyance for the Kazakhs, as they lost four of the five matches they boxed against Russians. In contrast, Bakhtiyar Artayev won the only match Kazakhstan had against the almost-invincible Cubans. Two boxers were defeated in the round of 16. Three more fell in the quarterfinals, just missing medals. The combined record of the eight boxers was 17-7.

Athlete	Event	Round of 32	Round of 16	Quarterfinals	Semifinals	Final	
Athlete	Event	Opposition Result	Opposition Result	Opposition Result	Opposition Result	Opposition Result	Rank
Mirzhan Rakhimzhanov	Flyweight	Serrano (PUR); W 42–23	Balakshin (RUS); L 20–29	Did not advance			
Galib Jafarov	Featherweight	Mayanja (UGA); W RSC	Khidirov (UZB); W 40–22	Tishchenko (RUS); L 26–36	Did not advance		
Serik Yeleuov	Lightweight	Bye	Díaz (DOM); W 28–16	Valentino (ITA); W 29–23	Khan (GBR); L 26–40	Did not advance	3rd place, bronze medalist(s)
Nurzhan Karimzhanov	Light welterweight	Navarro (MEX); W 48–31	Nafil (MAR); W 33–13	Georgiev (BUL); L 18–20	Did not advance		
Bakhtiyar Artayev	Welterweight	Tankeu (CMR); W WO	Bashirov (TKM); W 33–23	Polyakov (UKR); W RSC	Saitov (RUS); W 20–18	Aragón (CUB); W 36–26	1st place, gold medalist(s)
Gennady Golovkin	Middleweight	Bye	Khan (PAK); W 31–10	Yasser (EGY); W 31–20	Dirrell (USA); W 23–18	Gaydarbekov (RUS); L 18–28	2nd place, silver medalist(s)
Beibut Shumenov	Light heavyweight	Kuziemski (POL); W 34–22	Tarhan (TUR); L 19–27	Did not advance			
Mukhtarkhan Dildabekov	Super heavyweight	—N/a	Köber (GER); W 28–18	Povetkin (RUS); L 15–31	Did not advance		

== Canoeing ==
=== Sprint ===
Men

Athlete	Event	Heats		Semifinals		Final	
Athlete	Event	Time	Rank	Time	Rank	Time	Rank
Kaisar Nurmaganbetov	Men's C-1 500 m	1:55.636	6 q	1:53.333	5	Did not advance	
Kaisar Nurmaganbetov	Men's C-1 1000 m	4:00.486	5 q	3:57.804	5	Did not advance	
Natalya Sergeyeva	Women's K-1 500 m	DSQ		Did not advance			
Natalya Sergeyeva; Ellina Uzhakhova	Women's K-2 500 m	1:46.710	8 q	1:46.214	6	Did not advance	

Qualification Legend: Q = Qualify to final; q = Qualify to semifinal

== Cycling ==
=== Road ===
Athlete	Event	Time	Rank
Maxim Iglinsky	Men's road race	Did not finish	
Andrey Kashechkin	Men's road race	5:50:35	70
Andrey Kashechkin	Men's time trial	Did not finish	
Andrey Mizurov	Men's road race	5:51:28	73
Alexander Vinokourov	Men's road race	5:41:56	35
Alexander Vinokourov	Men's time trial	58:58.14	5
Serguei Yakovlev	Men's road race	5:48:48	53

=== Track ===
Pursuit

Athlete	Event	Qualification		Semifinals		Final	
Athlete	Event	Time	Rank	Opponent Results	Rank	Opponent Results	Rank
Yuriy Yuda	Men's individual pursuit	4:29.676	14	Did not advance			

Omnium

Athlete	Event	Points	Laps	Rank
Alexey Kolessov	Men's points race	22	1	15
Ilya Chernyshov; Yuriy Yuda	Men's madison	2	−1	12

== Gymnastics ==
=== Artistic ===
Men

Athlete	Event	Qualification								Final							
Athlete	Event	Apparatus						Total	Rank	Apparatus						Total	Rank
Athlete	Event	F	PH	R	V	PB	HB	Total	Rank	F	PH	R	V	PB	HB	Total	Rank
Yernar Yerimbetov	All-around	9.687	9.675	9.300	9.537	9.725	9.500	57.424	5 Q	9.312	8.962	9.537	9.625	9.225	9.737	56.398	14
Yernar Yerimbetov	Parallel bars	—N/a				9.725	—N/a	9.725	=8 Q	—N/a				9.737	—N/a	9.737	8

=== Rhythmic ===
Athlete	Event	Qualification						Final					
Athlete	Event	Hoop	Ball	Clubs	Ribbon	Total	Rank	Hoop	Ball	Clubs	Ribbon	Total	Rank
Aliya Yussupova	Individual	25.800	26.150	25.725	23.825	101.500	5 Q	25.500	26.600	26.325	25.550	103.975	4

== Judo ==
Eight Kazakh judoka (five men and three women) qualified for the 2004 Summer Olympics.

Men

Athlete	Event	Preliminary	Round of 32	Round of 16	Quarterfinals	Semifinals	Repechage 1	Repechage 2	Repechage 3	Final / BM	
Athlete	Event	Opposition Result	Opposition Result	Opposition Result	Opposition Result	Opposition Result	Opposition Result	Opposition Result	Opposition Result	Opposition Result	Rank
Bazarbek Donbay	−60 kg	Bye	Rebahi (ALG); W 1000–0000	Khergiani (GEO); L 0000–0010	Did not advance		Uematsu (ESP); L 0001–0200	Did not advance			
Muratbek Kipshakbayev	−66 kg	—N/a	Jacinto (DOM); W 0100–0000	Mijalković (SCG); W 0002–0001	Georgiev (BUL); L 0001–0100	Did not advance	Bye	Margoshvili (GEO); L 0001–0010	Did not advance		
Sagdat Sadykov	−73 kg	Pedro (USA); L 0000–1001	Did not advance								
Askhat Zhitkeyev	−100 kg	Bye	Makarau (BLR); L 0010–1010	Did not advance			Peltola (FIN); W 0221–0001	Jikurauli (GEO); W 1000–0000	Miraliyev (AZE); L 0001–0021	Did not advance	
Yeldos Ikhsangaliyev	+100 kg	Bye	Lazame (IRQ); W 1000–0000	van der Geest (NED); L 0001–1001	Did not advance						

Women

Athlete	Event	Round of 32	Round of 16	Quarterfinals	Semifinals	Repechage 1	Repechage 2	Repechage 3	Final / BM	
Athlete	Event	Opposition Result	Opposition Result	Opposition Result	Opposition Result	Opposition Result	Opposition Result	Opposition Result	Opposition Result	Rank
Tatyana Shishkina	−48 kg	Orozco (COL); W 0012–0011	Dumitru (ROM); L 0000–1011	Did not advance		Bye	Żemła-Krajewska (POL); L 0100–1000	Did not advance		
Sholpan Kaliyeva	−52 kg	Bye	Heylen (BEL); L 0000–1000	Did not advance						
Varvara Massyagina	−78 kg	Kubes (USA); L 0000–1000	Did not advance							

== Modern pentathlon ==
Two Kazakh athletes qualified to compete in the modern pentathlon event through the Asian Modern Pentathlon Championships.

Athlete	Event	Shooting (10 m air pistol)			Fencing (épée one touch)			Swimming (200 m freestyle)			Riding (show jumping)			Running (3000 m)			Total points	Final rank
Athlete	Event	Points	Rank	MP Points	Results	Rank	MP points	Time	Rank	MP points	Penalties	Rank	MP points	Time	Rank	MP Points	Total points	Final rank
Lada Jiyenbalanova	Women's	158	27	832	17–14	=7	860	2:18.49	7	1260	56	8	1144	11:25.45	21	980	5076	14
Lyudmila Shumilova	Women's	170	16	976	7–24	32	568	2:27.22	22	1156	168	22	1032	11:43.41	25	908	4640	30

== Shooting ==
Four Kazakh shooters qualified to compete in the following events:

Men

Athlete	Event	Qualification		Final	
Athlete	Event	Points	Rank	Points	Rank
Andrey Gurov	10 m running target	562	16	Did not advance	
Vladimir Issachenko	10 m air pistol	576	=23	Did not advance	
Vladimir Issachenko	50 m pistol	561	7 Q	654.5	6

Women

Athlete	Event	Qualification		Final	
Athlete	Event	Points	Rank	Points	Rank
Galina Belyayeva	10 m air pistol	373	33	Did not advance	
Galina Belyayeva	25 m pistol	577	=13	Did not advance	
Olga Dovgun	10 m air rifle	395	=12	Did not advance	
Olga Dovgun	50 m rifle 3 positions	588	1 Q	684.9	4

== Swimming ==
Kazakh swimmers earned qualifying standards in the following events (up to a maximum of 2 swimmers in each event at the A-standard time, and 1 at the B-standard time):

Men

Athlete	Event	Heat		Semifinal		Final	
Athlete	Event	Time	Rank	Time	Rank	Time	Rank
Vitaliy Khan	200 m freestyle	1:56.11	55	Did not advance			
Rustam Khudiyev	100 m butterfly	55.03	41	Did not advance			
Stanislav Osinsky	100 m backstroke	59.92	41	Did not advance			
Vladislav Polyakov	100 m breaststroke	1:01.16 NR	7 Q	1:01.36	8 Q	1:01.34	5
Vladislav Polyakov	200 m breaststroke	2:12.96	6 Q	2:12.19 NR	7 Q	2:11.76 NR	5
Yevgeniy Ryzhkov	200 m individual medley	DSQ		Did not advance			
Oleg Shteynikov	50 m freestyle	23.88	55	Did not advance			
Vyacheslav Titarenko	100 m freestyle	52.09	51	Did not advance			

Women

Athlete	Event	Heat		Semifinal		Final	
Athlete	Event	Time	Rank	Time	Rank	Time	Rank
Marina Mulyayeva	200 m individual medley	2:24.25	28	Did not advance			
Anastassiya Prilepa	100 m backstroke	1:07.55	38	Did not advance			
Yuliya Rissik	200 m freestyle	2:09.93	41	Did not advance			
Yelena Skalinskaya	50 m freestyle	27.04	39	Did not advance			
Yelena Skalinskaya	100 m freestyle	58.56	41	Did not advance			

== Synchronized swimming ==
Two Kazakh synchronized swimmers qualified a spot in the women's duet.

Athlete	Event	Technical routine		Free routine (preliminary)			Free routine (final)		
Athlete	Event	Points	Rank	Points	Total (technical + free)	Rank	Points	Total (technical + free)	Rank
Aliya Karimova; Arna Toktagan	Duet	42.250	18	42.667	84.917	18	Did not advance		

== Taekwondo ==
Kazakhstan has sent one taekwondo jin to compete.

Athlete	Event	Round of 16	Quarterfinals	Semifinals	Repechage 1	Repechage 2	Final / BM	
Athlete	Event	Opposition Result	Opposition Result	Opposition Result	Opposition Result	Opposition Result	Opposition Result	Rank
Adilkhan Sagindykov	Men's +80 kg	Moon D-S (KOR); L 2–7	Did not advance		García (ESP); W 5–5 SUP	Kamal (JOR); L 2–2 SUP	Did not advance	5

== Triathlon ==
Four Kazakh triathletes qualified for the following events.

Athlete	Event	Swim (1.5 km)	Trans 1	Bike (40 km)	Trans 2	Run (10 km)	Total Time	Rank
Dmitriy Gaag	Men's	18:29	0:17	1:05:23	0:19	32:36	1:56:28.97	25
Daniil Sapunov	Men's	18:14	0:19	1:02:41	0:20	33:38	1:54:33.15	17
Yekaterina Shatnaya	Women's	22:00	0:22	1:16:50	0:25	40:36	2:19:26.75	41

== Water polo ==
=== Men's tournament ===
Roster

The following is the Kazakh roster in the men's water polo tournament of the 2004 Summer Olympics.

Head coach: Askar Orazalinov

№	Name	Pos.	Height	Weight	Date of birth	2004 club
1	Alexandr Shvedov (C)	GK	1.97 m (6 ft 6 in)	83 kg (183 lb)	11 April 1973	(Kazakhstan) Dynamo Alma-Ata
2	Sergey Drozdov	D	1.83 m (6 ft 0 in)	81 kg (179 lb)	23 October 1969	(Russia) Sintez Kazan
3	Alexandr Gaidukov	D	1.84 m (6 ft 0 in)	90 kg (200 lb)	10 January 1974	(Russia) Spartak Volgograd
4	Sergey Gorovoy	CF	1.88 m (6 ft 2 in)	86 kg (190 lb)	6 August 1975	(Russia) Sintez Kazan
5	Alexandr Shidlovskiy	D	1.87 m (6 ft 2 in)	88 kg (194 lb)	14 July 1974	(Russia) CSK VMF Moscow
6	Ivan Zaytsev	D	1.86 m (6 ft 1 in)	88 kg (194 lb)	11 March 1975	(Russia) Dynamo Moscow
7	Alexandr Elke	CB	1.90 m (6 ft 3 in)	95 kg (209 lb)	18 January 1971	(Spain) Real Canoe NC
8	Artemiy Sevostyanov	CB	1.88 m (6 ft 2 in)	92 kg (203 lb)	2 February 1973	(Russia) Sintez Kazan
9	Yevgeniy Zhilyayev	CB	1.87 m (6 ft 2 in)	95 kg (209 lb)	13 July 1973	(Russia) Dynamo Moscow
10	Igor Zagoruyko	D	1.88 m (6 ft 2 in)	87 kg (192 lb)	31 May 1971	(Russia) Sintez Kazan
11	Yury Smolovoy	CF	1.96 m (6 ft 5 in)	118 kg (260 lb)	9 April 1970	(Russia) Spartak Volgograd
13	Alexandr Polukhin	GK	1.87 m (6 ft 2 in)	94 kg (207 lb)	15 October 1961	(Kazakhstan) Dynamo Alma-Ata

Group play

Pos	Team	Pld	W	D	L	GF	GA	GD	Pts	Qualification
1	Hungary	5	5	0	0	44	27	+17	10	Qualified for the semifinals
2	Serbia and Montenegro	5	4	0	1	37	26	+11	8	Qualified for the quarterfinals
3	Russia	5	3	0	2	32	28	+4	6	Qualified for the quarterfinals
4	United States	5	2	0	3	32	37	−5	4	
5	Croatia	5	1	0	4	35	41	−6	2	
6	Kazakhstan	5	0	0	5	21	42	−21	0	

15 August 2004; 16:30	Russia	5–2	Kazakhstan	Athens Olympic Aquatic Centre; Referees: Koratochvil (SVK), Koryzna (POL)
15 August 2004; 16:30	Score by quarters: 0-0, 1-0, 2-1, 2-1			Athens Olympic Aquatic Centre; Referees: Koratochvil (SVK), Koryzna (POL)
15 August 2004; 16:30	Chomakhidze, Gorshkov 2	Goals	2 players with 1	Athens Olympic Aquatic Centre; Referees: Koratochvil (SVK), Koryzna (POL)

17 August 2004; 16:30	Kazakhstan	6–9	United States	Athens Olympic Aquatic Centre; Referees: Patelli (BRA), Bock (GER)
17 August 2004; 16:30	Score by quarters: 1-1, 3-4, 0-1, 2-3			Athens Olympic Aquatic Centre; Referees: Patelli (BRA), Bock (GER)
17 August 2004; 16:30	Drozdov 3	Goals	Wigo 4	Athens Olympic Aquatic Centre; Referees: Patelli (BRA), Bock (GER)

19 August 2004; 09:30	Serbia and Montenegro	9–5	Kazakhstan	Athens Olympic Aquatic Centre; Referees: Legare (CAN), Sayed Mahmoud (EGY)
19 August 2004; 09:30	Score by quarters: 3-1, 2-1, 1-1, 3-2			Athens Olympic Aquatic Centre; Referees: Legare (CAN), Sayed Mahmoud (EGY)
19 August 2004; 09:30	Šapić 3	Goals	Zhilyayev 3	Athens Olympic Aquatic Centre; Referees: Legare (CAN), Sayed Mahmoud (EGY)

21 August 2004; 09:30	Kazakhstan	4–14	Hungary	Athens Olympic Aquatic Centre; Referees: Koryzna (POL), Patelli (BRA)
21 August 2004; 09:30	Score by quarters: 1-3, 0-4, 2-4, 1-3			Athens Olympic Aquatic Centre; Referees: Koryzna (POL), Patelli (BRA)
21 August 2004; 09:30	4 players with 1	Goals	Kásás, Kiss 3	Athens Olympic Aquatic Centre; Referees: Koryzna (POL), Patelli (BRA)

23 August 2004; 10:45	Croatia	5–4	Kazakhstan	Athens Olympic Aquatic Centre; Referees: Matache (ROU), Rezek (CZE)
23 August 2004; 10:45	Score by quarters: 2-2, 2-0, 0-0, 1-2			Athens Olympic Aquatic Centre; Referees: Matache (ROU), Rezek (CZE)
23 August 2004; 10:45	Smodlaka 2	Goals	4 players with 1	Athens Olympic Aquatic Centre; Referees: Matache (ROU), Rezek (CZE)

9th-12th Place Semifinal

25 August 2004; 09:30	Kazakhstan	5–10	Australia	Athens Olympic Aquatic Centre; Referees: Matache (ROU), Patelli (BRA)
25 August 2004; 09:30	Score by quarters: 2-2, 1-4, 1-3, 1-1			Athens Olympic Aquatic Centre; Referees: Matache (ROU), Patelli (BRA)
25 August 2004; 09:30	Elke 2	Goals	Figlioli, Thomas 2	Athens Olympic Aquatic Centre; Referees: Matache (ROU), Patelli (BRA)

11th-12th Place Final

27 August 2004; 09:30	Kazakhstan	15–7	Egypt	Athens Olympic Aquatic Centre; Referees: Rezek (CZE), Patelli (BRA)
27 August 2004; 09:30	Score by quarters: 6-0, 1-2, 5-3, 3-2			Athens Olympic Aquatic Centre; Referees: Rezek (CZE), Patelli (BRA)
27 August 2004; 09:30	Zaitsev 7	Goals	Mashhour, Khalil 2	Athens Olympic Aquatic Centre; Referees: Rezek (CZE), Patelli (BRA)

=== Women's tournament ===
Roster

The following is the Kazakh roster in the women's water polo tournament of the 2004 Summer Olympics.

Head coach: (Russia) Stanislav Pivovarov

№	Name	Pos.	Height	Weight	Date of birth	2004 club
1	Galina Rytova	GK	1.75 m (5 ft 9 in)	71 kg (157 lb)	10 September 1975	(Italy) Rari Nantes-Città di Augusta
2	Anna Zubkova	D	1.71 m (5 ft 7 in)	65 kg (143 lb)	3 February 1980	(Russia) Uralochka Zlatoust
3	Tatyana Gubina	CB	1.78 m (5 ft 10 in)	67 kg (148 lb)	15 December 1977	(Kazakhstan) Eurasia Rakhat
4	Svetlana Khapsalis	GK	1.86 m (6 ft 1 in)	63 kg (139 lb)	15 June 1973	(Kazakhstan) Eurasia Rakhat
5	Svetlana Koroleva	D	1.74 m (5 ft 9 in)	69 kg (152 lb)	7 September 1973	(Kazakhstan) Eurasia Rakhat
6	Natalya Krassilnikova	CB	1.73 m (5 ft 8 in)	63 kg (139 lb)	2 January 1982	(Kazakhstan) Eurasia Rakhat
7	Alyona Klimenko	D	1.65 m (5 ft 5 in)	56 kg (123 lb)	19 September 1982	(Kazakhstan) Eurasia Rakhat
8	Yekaterina Gariyeva	CF	1.75 m (5 ft 9 in)	72 kg (159 lb)	11 June 1981	(Kazakhstan) Eurasia Rakhat
9	Assel Jakayeva (C)	CF	1.68 m (5 ft 6 in)	70 kg (150 lb)	14 March 1980	(Russia) Kinef Kirishi
10	Marina Gritsenko	D	1.73 m (5 ft 8 in)	64 kg (141 lb)	17 August 1980	(Kazakhstan) Eurasia Rakhat
11	Larissa Mikhailova	D	1.70 m (5 ft 7 in)	67 kg (148 lb)	13 July 1981	(Russia) Uralochka Zlatoust
12	Natalya Ignatyeva	D	1.68 m (5 ft 6 in)	56 kg (123 lb)	17 August 1978	(Kazakhstan) Eurasia Rakhat
13	Irina Tolkunova	D	1.70 m (5 ft 7 in)	58 kg (128 lb)	2 June 1971	(Italy) Volturno SC

Group play

Pos	Team	Pld	W	D	L	GF	GA	GD	Pts	Qualification
1	Australia	3	2	1	0	22	16	+6	5	Qualified for the Semifinals
2	Italy	3	2	0	1	20	14	+6	4	Qualified for the Quarterfinals
3	Greece	3	1	1	1	17	20	−3	3	Qualified for the Quarterfinals
4	Kazakhstan	3	0	0	3	16	25	−9	0	

16 August 2004; 17:45	Report	Greece	8–6	Kazakhstan	Athens Olympic Aquatic Centre; Referees: Radu Matache (ROU); Daniel Legare (CAN)
16 August 2004; 17:45	Report	Score by quarters: 2–2, 2–1, 2–2, 2–1			Athens Olympic Aquatic Centre; Referees: Radu Matache (ROU); Daniel Legare (CAN)
16 August 2004; 17:45	Report	Roumpesi 2 Karagianni 1 Kozompoli 1 Liosi 1 Moraiti 1 Evangelia Moraitidou 1 Oikonomopoulou 1	Goals	Gritsenko 2 Jakayeva 2 Koroleva 1 Tolkunova 1	Athens Olympic Aquatic Centre; Referees: Radu Matache (ROU); Daniel Legare (CAN)

18 August 2004; 09:30	Report	Australia	9–4	Kazakhstan	Athens Olympic Aquatic Centre; Referees: Boris Margeta (SLO); Hector Valcarce (ARG)
18 August 2004; 09:30	Report	Score by quarters: 3–2, 2–1, 2–0, 2–1			Athens Olympic Aquatic Centre; Referees: Boris Margeta (SLO); Hector Valcarce (ARG)
18 August 2004; 09:30	Report	Heuchan 3 Norwood 3 Castle 1 Gynther 1 Rippon 1	Goals	Ignatyeva 1 Jakayeva 1 Tolkunova 1 Zubkova 1	Athens Olympic Aquatic Centre; Referees: Boris Margeta (SLO); Hector Valcarce (ARG)

20 August 2004; 09:00	Report	Italy	8–6	Kazakhstan	Athens Olympic Aquatic Centre; Referees: Mario Brguljan (SCG); Yesenia Marrero (USA)
20 August 2004; 09:00	Report	Score by quarters: 2–0, 3–1, 1–4, 2–1			Athens Olympic Aquatic Centre; Referees: Mario Brguljan (SCG); Yesenia Marrero (USA)
20 August 2004; 09:00	Report	di Mario 4 Araujo 1 Miceli 1 Tóth 1 Zanchi 1	Goals	Koroleva 3 Gubina 2 Mikhailova 1	Athens Olympic Aquatic Centre; Referees: Mario Brguljan (SCG); Yesenia Marrero (USA)

7th-8th Place Final

22 August 2004; 10:45	Report	Kazakhstan	4–10	Canada	Athens Olympic Aquatic Centre; Referees: Radosław Koryzna (POL); Elizabeth Burman (NZL)
22 August 2004; 10:45	Report	Score by quarters: 0–2, 1–4, 3–3, 0–1			Athens Olympic Aquatic Centre; Referees: Radosław Koryzna (POL); Elizabeth Burman (NZL)
22 August 2004; 10:45	Report	Koroleva 4	Goals	Arpin 2 Bégin 2 Campbell 2 Gardiner 2 Dow 1 Illing 1	Athens Olympic Aquatic Centre; Referees: Radosław Koryzna (POL); Elizabeth Burman (NZL)

== Weightlifting ==
Three Kazakh weightlifters qualified for the following events:

Athlete	Event	Snatch		Clean & Jerk		Total	Rank
Athlete	Event	Result	Rank	Result	Rank	Total	Rank
Sergey Filimonov	Men's −77 kg	172.5	=1	200	=2	372.5	2nd place, silver medalist(s)
Bakhyt Akhmetov	Men's −94 kg	180	=4	210	=8	390	7
Tatyana Khromova	Women's −75 kg	117.5	5	135	8	252.5	6

== Wrestling ==
Kazakh wrestlers qualified to compete in all events except the men's freestyle 60 kg class and the women's freestyle wrestling.

Key:

- VT - Victory by Fall.
- PP - Decision by Points - the loser with technical points.
- PO - Decision by Points - the loser without technical points.

Men's freestyle

Athlete	Event	Elimination Pool				Quarterfinal	Semifinal	Final / BM	
Athlete	Event	Opposition Result	Opposition Result	Opposition Result	Rank	Opposition Result	Opposition Result	Opposition Result	Rank
Baurzhan Orazgaliyev	−55 kg	Zakharuk (UKR); L 1–3 ^{PP}	Kantoyeu (BLR); L 1–3 ^{PP}	—N/a	3	Did not advance			9
Leonid Spiridonov	−66 kg	MacDonald (CAN); W 3–1 ^{PP}	Barzakov (BUL); W 3–1 ^{PP}	—N/a	1 Q	Ikematsu (JPN); W 3–1 ^{PP}	Tedeyev (UKR); L 1–3 ^{PP}	Murtazaliev (RUS); L 1–3 ^{PP}	4
Gennadiy Laliyev	−74 kg	Ackerman (GBR); W 4–0 ^{ST}	Gevorgyan (ARM); W 5–0 ^{VT}	—N/a	1 Q	Williams (USA); W 3–1 ^{PP}	Fundora (CUB); W 3–1 ^{PP}	Saitiev (RUS); L 0–3 ^{PO}	2nd place, silver medalist(s)
Magomed Kurugliyev	−84 kg	Borchanka (BLR); L 1–3 ^{PP}	Sanderson (USA); L 1–3 ^{PP}	—N/a	3	Did not advance			18
Islam Bairamukov	−96 kg	Aghayev (AZE); L 1–3 ^{PP}	Jacobs (NAM); W 3–1 ^{PP}	—N/a	2	Did not advance			10
Marid Mutalimov	−120 kg	Mildzihov (KGZ); W 3–1 ^{PP}	Miano-Petta (ITA); W 3–0 ^{PO}	McCoy (USA); W 3–1 ^{PP}	1 Q	Bye	Rezaei (IRI); L 1–3 ^{PP}	Polatçı (TUR); L 1–3 ^{PP}	4

Men's Greco-Roman

Athlete	Event	Elimination Pool				Quarterfinal	Semifinal	Final / BM	
Athlete	Event	Opposition Result	Opposition Result	Opposition Result	Rank	Opposition Result	Opposition Result	Opposition Result	Rank
Nurbakyt Tengizbayev	−55 kg	Im D-W (KOR); L 1–3 ^{PP}	Sandu (ROM); L 0–3 ^{PO}	—N/a	3	Did not advance			17
Nurlan Koizhaiganov	−60 kg	Fucile (ITA); W 3–0 ^{PO}	Chachua (GEO); W 3–1 ^{PP}	—N/a	1 Q	Shevtsov (RUS); L 1–3 ^{PP}	Did not advance	Sasamoto (JPN); L 0–3 ^{PO}	6
Mkhitar Manukyan	−66 kg	Zamanduridis (GER); W 3–1 ^{PP}	Arkoudeas (GRE); W 3–1 ^{PP}	Wood (USA); W 4–1 ^{SP}	1 Q	Bye	Eroğlu (TUR); L 0–5 ^{VT}	Samuelsson (SWE); W 3–1 ^{PP}	3rd place, bronze medalist(s)
Danil Khalimov	−74 kg	Manasherov (ISR); W 3–0 ^{PO}	Recuero (ESP); W 3–1 ^{PP}	—N/a	1 Q	Bucher (SUI); L 0–3 ^{PO}	Did not advance	Azcuy (CUB); W 5–0 ^{VB}	5
Asset Mambetov	−96 kg	G Koutsioumpas (GRE); L 0–3 ^{PO}	Sitnik (POL); L 0–3 ^{PO}	Gaber (EGY); L 0–5 ^{VT}	4	Did not advance			21
Georgiy Tsurtsumia	−120 kg	X Koutsioumpas (GRE); W 3–1 ^{PP}	Giorgadze (GEO); L 1–3 ^{PP}	Bengtsson (SWE); W 5–0 ^{VT}	1 Q	Bye	Gardner (USA); W 3–1 ^{PP}	Baroyev (RUS); L 1–3 ^{PP}	2nd place, silver medalist(s)

== See also ==
- Kazakhstan at the 2002 Asian Games
- Kazakhstan at the 2004 Summer Paralympics
