= Beach water polo at the 2008 Asian Beach Games =

- Venue: Tanjung Benoa
- Dates: 19–22 October 2008

Beach water polo at the 2008 Asian Beach Games was held from 19 October to 22 October in Tanjung Benoa, Bali, Indonesia. Only four teams entered the competition.

== Medalists ==
Event	Gold	Silver	Bronze
Men	Kazakhstan; Sergey Drozdov; Alexandr Margolin; Rustam Ukumanov; Oleg Chsherbakov; Alexandr Shvedov; Nail Nurov; Yevgeniy Medvedev; Viktor Salnichenko	Kuwait; Nawaf Al-Asamawi; Mohammad Al-Mulla; Saleh Mohammad; Fahad Malallah; Yousef Al-Tawhid; Jasem Al-Safran; Ahmad Mandani; Faisal Al-Ghanim	Indonesia; Muhammad Zamri; Deni Novendra; Indrawan Ginting; Hendri Marcyano Raditya; Reza Aditya Putra; Heriansyah Saragih; Ridjkie Mulia Harahap; Maulana Bayu Herfianto

== Results ==
=== Preliminaries ===
Pos	Team	Pld	W	D	L	GF	GA	GD	Pts
1	Kazakhstan	3	3	0	0	41	23	+18	9
2	Kuwait	3	2	0	1	31	20	+11	6
3	Indonesia	3	1	0	2	30	32	−2	3
4	Qatar	3	0	0	3	12	39	−27	0

Source: Official website

19 October; 13:00	Kazakhstan	11–7	Kuwait	Tanjung Benoa, Bali; Referees: Tan Hong Boon (SIN)
19 October; 13:00	Scoring by half: 9–3, 2–4			Tanjung Benoa, Bali; Referees: Tan Hong Boon (SIN)

19 October; 14:00	Qatar	5–12	Indonesia	Tanjung Benoa, Bali; Referees: Alan Balfanbayev (KAZ)
19 October; 14:00	Scoring by half: 2–6, 3–6			Tanjung Benoa, Bali; Referees: Alan Balfanbayev (KAZ)

20 October; 13:00	Indonesia	11–16	Kazakhstan	Tanjung Benoa, Bali; Referees: Ahmad Farman (KUW)
20 October; 13:00	Scoring by half: 4–10, 7–6			Tanjung Benoa, Bali; Referees: Ahmad Farman (KUW)

20 October; 14:00	Kuwait	13–2	Qatar	Tanjung Benoa, Bali; Referees: Johny Ting (MAS)
20 October; 14:00	Scoring by half: 4–2, 9–0			Tanjung Benoa, Bali; Referees: Johny Ting (MAS)

21 October; 14:00	Kazakhstan	14–5	Qatar	Tanjung Benoa, Bali; Referees: Lucky Damapoli (INA)
21 October; 14:00	Scoring by half: 7–2, 7–3			Tanjung Benoa, Bali; Referees: Lucky Damapoli (INA)

21 October; 15:00	Kuwait	11–7	Indonesia	Tanjung Benoa, Bali; Referees: Alan Balfanbayev (KAZ)
21 October; 15:00	Scoring by half: 6–2, 5–5			Tanjung Benoa, Bali; Referees: Alan Balfanbayev (KAZ)

=== Final round ===
==== 3rd place match ====
22 October; 14:00	Indonesia	11–7	Qatar	Tanjung Benoa, Bali; Referees: Ahmad Farman (KUW)
22 October; 14:00	Scoring by half: 4–0, 7–7			Tanjung Benoa, Bali; Referees: Ahmad Farman (KUW)

==== Final ====
22 October; 15:00	Kuwait	9–11	Kazakhstan	Tanjung Benoa, Bali; Referees: Tan Hong Boon (SIN)
22 October; 15:00	Scoring by half: 2–9, 7–2			Tanjung Benoa, Bali; Referees: Tan Hong Boon (SIN)
