= Water polo at the 2002 Asian Games =

- Venue: Changwon Swimming Pool
- Dates: 30 September – 6 October 2002
- Competitors: 78 from 6 nations

Water polo was contested by men's teams at the 2002 Asian Games in Busan, South Korea from September 30 to October 6, 2002. Six teams competed in two round robin groups. All games were staged at the Changwon Swimming Pool.

== Schedule ==
P	Preliminary round	½	Semifinals	F	Finals

Event↓/Date →	30th Mon	1st Tue	2nd Wed	3rd Thu	4th Fri	5th Sat	6th Sun
Men	P	P	P		½		F

== Medalists ==
Event	Gold	Silver	Bronze
Men	Kazakhstan; Alexandr Shvedov; Sergey Drozdov; Alexandr Gaidukov; Sergey Gorovoy; Askar Orazalinov; Ivan Zaitsev; Alexandr Shidlovskiy; Alexandr Kuzov; Yevgeniy Zhilyayev; Artemiy Sevostyanov; Yuriy Smoloviy; Damir Temyrkhanov; Alexandr Polukhin	Japan; Fumikazu Kubota; Daisuke Nakagawa; Satoshi Nagata; Takuya Endo; Koji Tanaka; Masakazu Yamamoto; Hiroyuki Matsubara; Atsushi Naganuma; Hiroshi Hoshiai; Taichi Sato; Yoshinori Shiota; Kan Aoyagi; Kenichi Sato	China; Ge Weiqing; Zhang Weiteng; Bai Jun; Yu Lijun; Xu Guanghao; Li Jun; Li Wenhua; Wang Yong; Zhu Junyi; Han Zhidong; Gui Jiye; Zhao Jinwen; Liao Qiuliang

== Draw ==
The teams were seeded based on their final ranking at the 1998 Asian Games.

Group A

- South Korea (Host)
- China (3)
- Japan
- ~~Sri Lanka~~*

Group B

- Kazakhstan (1)
- ~~Uzbekistan (2)~~*
- Iran
- ~~India~~*
- Singapore

* Withdrew.

== Squads ==
Squads

China	Iran	Japan	Kazakhstan
Ge Weiqing; Zhang Weiteng; Bai Jun; Yu Lijun; Xu Guanghao; Li Jun; Li Wenhua; Wang Yong; Zhu Junyi; Han Zhidong; Gui Jiye; Zhao Jinwen; Liao Qiuliang	Alireza Shahidipour; Bahman Mouchehkiani; Alireza Amirian; Ahmad Nesaei; Majid Gholami; Vahid Rezaei; Ali Saleh; Saeid Mirmehdi; Kambiz Rakhshanimehr; Ali Akbar Shirijian; Hamed Dalil-Heirati; Mohsen Rezvani; Meisam Jafari	Fumikazu Kubota; Daisuke Nakagawa; Satoshi Nagata; Takuya Endo; Koji Tanaka; Masakazu Yamamoto; Hiroyuki Matsubara; Atsushi Naganuma; Hiroshi Hoshiai; Taichi Sato; Yoshinori Shiota; Kan Aoyagi; Kenichi Sato	Alexandr Shvedov; Sergey Drozdov; Alexandr Gaidukov; Sergey Gorovoy; Askar Orazalinov; Ivan Zaitsev; Alexandr Shidlovskiy; Alexandr Kuzov; Yevgeniy Zhilyayev; Artemiy Sevostyanov; Yuriy Smoloviy; Damir Temyrkhanov; Alexandr Polukhin
Singapore	South Korea		
Ng Ker Wei; Shawn Khoo; Nicholas Tan; Darrell Ee; Lee Sai Meng; Lau Chok Yee; Alvin Lee; Derek Lee; Marcus Ng; Terence Tan; Matthew Lui; Yip Ren Kai; David Wee	Jin Man-keun; Jang Dong-bok; Lee Min-soo; Kim Hyun-jong; Maeng Sung-hoon; Kim Ki-woo; Kim Ji-ho; Ma Jae-min; Shin Kwang-ho; Hong In-ki; Kim Hong-ryang; Lee Myung-woo; Baek Won-ki		

== Results ==
All times are Korea Standard Time (UTC+09:00)

=== Preliminary round ===
==== Group A ====
Pos	Team	Pld	W	D	L	GF	GA	GD	Pts	Qualification
1	Japan	2	2	0	0	17	14	+3	4	Semifinals
2	China	2	1	0	1	16	13	+3	2	Semifinals
3	South Korea	2	0	0	2	12	18	−6	0	5th place match

Source: Results

30 September; 17:30	South Korea	7–9	Japan	Changwon Swimming Pool, Changwon
30 September; 17:30	Score by quarters: 2–2, 3–3, 2–2, 0–2			Changwon Swimming Pool, Changwon

1 October; 16:00	China	7–8	Japan	Changwon Swimming Pool, Changwon
1 October; 16:00	Score by quarters: 1–3, 1–2, 3–1, 2–2			Changwon Swimming Pool, Changwon

2 October; 17:30	South Korea	5–9	China	Changwon Swimming Pool, Changwon
2 October; 17:30	Score by quarters: 1–2, 2–4, 0–0, 2–3			Changwon Swimming Pool, Changwon

==== Group B ====
Pos	Team	Pld	W	D	L	GF	GA	GD	Pts	Qualification
1	Kazakhstan	2	2	0	0	29	10	+19	4	Semifinals
2	Iran	2	1	0	1	17	15	+2	2	Semifinals
3	Singapore	2	0	0	2	9	30	−21	0	5th place match

Source: Results

30 September; 16:00	Kazakhstan	17–6	Singapore	Changwon Swimming Pool, Changwon
30 September; 16:00	Score by quarters: 6–2, 3–1, 3–2, 5–1			Changwon Swimming Pool, Changwon

1 October; 17:30	Iran	13–3	Singapore	Changwon Swimming Pool, Changwon
1 October; 17:30	Score by quarters: 4–0, 3–1, 1–2, 5–0			Changwon Swimming Pool, Changwon

2 October; 16:00	Kazakhstan	12–4	Iran	Changwon Swimming Pool, Changwon
2 October; 16:00	Score by quarters: 4–1, 2–1, 4–0, 2–2			Changwon Swimming Pool, Changwon

=== 5th place match ===
4 October; 14:30	South Korea	11–4	Singapore	Changwon Swimming Pool, Changwon
4 October; 14:30	Score by quarters: 3–0, 3–3, 2–0, 3–1			Changwon Swimming Pool, Changwon

=== Final round ===
Semifinals
4 October
Japan	12
Iran	9
4 October
China	2
Kazakhstan	9

Gold medal match
6 October
Japan	10 (4)
Kazakhstan (p)	10 (5)
Bronze medal match
6 October
Iran	6
China	10

==== Semifinals ====
4 October; 16:00	Japan	12–9	Iran	Changwon Swimming Pool, Changwon
4 October; 16:00	Score by quarters: 2–1, 2–3, 4–3, 4–2			Changwon Swimming Pool, Changwon

4 October; 17:30	China	2–9	Kazakhstan	Changwon Swimming Pool, Changwon
4 October; 17:30	Score by quarters: 1–3, 1–2, 0–2, 0–2			Changwon Swimming Pool, Changwon

==== Bronze medal match ====
6 October; 16:00	Iran	6–10	China	Changwon Swimming Pool, Changwon
6 October; 16:00	Score by quarters: 1–4, 0–1, 3–3, 2–2			Changwon Swimming Pool, Changwon

==== Gold medal match ====
6 October; 17:30	Japan	14–15 (OT, PSO)	Kazakhstan	Changwon Swimming Pool, Changwon
6 October; 17:30	Score by quarters: 1–1, 3–3, 1–2, 3–2 OT: 2–2 PSO: 4–5			Changwon Swimming Pool, Changwon

== Final standing ==
Rank	Team	Pld	W	D	L
1st place, gold medalist(s)	Kazakhstan	4	4	0	0
2nd place, silver medalist(s)	Japan	4	3	0	1
3rd place, bronze medalist(s)	China	4	2	0	2
4	Iran	4	1	0	3
5	South Korea	3	1	0	2
6	Singapore	3	0	0	3
