= Jorge Segura =

Jorge Segura may refer to:

- Jorge Segura (footballer) (born 1997), Colombian footballer
- Jorge Segura (racewalker) (born 1975), Mexican racewalker
