= Athletics at the 1998 Asian Games – Men's 20 kilometres walk =

Men's 20 kilometres walk at the 1998 Asian Games
- Venue: Thammasat Stadium
- Dates: 13 December 1998
- Competitors: 10 from 8 nations

Medalists
| gold medal | Yu Guohui | China |
| silver medal | Valeriy Borisov | Kazakhstan |
| bronze medal | Li Zewen | China |

The men's 20 kilometres walk competition at the 1998 Asian Games in Bangkok, Thailand was held on 13 December.

== Schedule ==
All times are Indochina Time (UTC+07:00)

| Date | Time | Event |
|---|---|---|
| Sunday, 13 December 1998 | 07:00 | Final |

== Results ==
Legend

- DNF — Did not finish

| Rank | Athlete | Time | Notes |
|---|---|---|---|
| 1st place, gold medalist(s) | Yu Guohui (CHN) | 1:20:25 | GR |
| 2nd place, silver medalist(s) | Valeriy Borisov (KAZ) | 1:23:52 | |
| 3rd place, bronze medalist(s) | Li Zewen (CHN) | 1:24:41 | |
| 4 | Yoshimi Hara (JPN) | 1:25:14 | |
| 5 | Shin Il-yong (KOR) | 1:29:22 | |
| 6 | Nishantha Nayanananda (SRI) | 1:30:45 | |
| 7 | Sakchai Samutkao (THA) | 1:31:01 | |
| 8 | Rami Deeb (PLE) | 1:35:44 | |
| 9 | Wid Sankrod (THA) | 1:39:41 | |
| — | Teoh Boon Lim (MAS) | DNF | |
