= Athletics at the 1999 Summer Universiade – Men's 20 kilometres walk =

The men's 20 kilometres walk event at the 1999 Summer Universiade was held in Palma de Mallorca, Spain on 10 July.

== Results ==
| Rank | Athlete | Nationality | Time | Notes |
|---|---|---|---|---|
| 1st place, gold medalist(s) | Alejandro López | Mexico | 1:25:12 | |
| 2nd place, silver medalist(s) | Lorenzo Civallero | Italy | 1:25:23 | |
| 3rd place, bronze medalist(s) | Daisuke Ikeshima | Japan | 1:26:01 | |
| 4 | Fedosei Ciumacenco | Moldova | 1:26:16 | |
| 5 | Francesco Galdenzi | Italy | 1:26:52 | |
| 6 | Shin Il-yong | South Korea | 1:27:03 | PB |
| 7 | Juan Antonio Porras | Spain | 1:27:43 | |
| 8 | Pei Chuang | China | 1:28:02 | PB |
| 9 | Li Guoqing | China | 1:29:12 | SB |
| 10 | Silviu Casandra | Romania | 1:30:59 | |
| 11 | Kevin Eastler | United States | 1:32:20 | |
| 12 | Peter Barto | Slovakia | 1:32:31 | |
| 13 | Sten Reichel | Germany | 1:33:32 | |
| | Merzak Abbès | Algeria | DQ | |
| | Artur Meleshkevich | Belarus | DQ | |
| | Claudio Erasmo Vargas | Mexico | DQ | |
| | Vladimir Stankin | Russia | DQ | |
| | Al Heppner | United States | DQ | |
