= Shin Il-yong =

South Korean racewalker

- Hangul: 신일용
- RR: Sin Ilyong
- MR: Sin Iryong

Shin Il-yong
Personal information
- Born: 17 February 1979 (age 47) Seoul, South Korea

Sport
- Sport: Race walking
Medal record
Representing South Korea
Asian Championships
Silver medal – second place	2007 Amman	20 km walk
Bronze medal – third place	2002 Colombo	20 km walk
East Asian Games
Silver medal – second place	2005 Macau	20 km walk

Shin Il-yong (Korean: 신일용; born 17 February 1979) is a South Korean race walker.

== Achievements ==
Year	Competition	Venue	Position	Event	Notes
Representing South Korea
1998	World Junior Championships	Annecy, France	9th	10,000 m	44:11.96
1998	Asian Games	Bangkok, Thailand	5th	20 km	1:29:22
1999	Universiade	Palma de Mallorca, Spain	6th	20 km	1:27:03
2000	Olympic Games	Sydney, Australia	30th	20 km	1:26:22
2001	World Championships	Edmonton, Canada	19th	20 km	1:27:47
2002	Asian Championships	Colombo, Sri Lanka	3rd	20 km	1:31:07
2004	Olympic Games	Athens, Greece	29th	20 km	1:28:02
2005	World Championships	Helsinki, Finland	16th	20 km	1:23:10
2005	East Asian Games	Macau	2nd	20 km	1:24:44
2006	World Race Walking Cup	A Coruña, Spain	63rd	20 km	1:29:13
2007	Asian Championships	Amman, Jordan	2nd	20 km	1:31:33.4
