= 2007 Asian Athletics Championships – Men's 20 kilometres walk =

The men's 20 kilometres walk event at the 2007 Asian Athletics Championships was held in Amman, Jordan on July 26.

== Results ==
Rank	Name	Nationality	Time	Notes
1st place, gold medalist(s)	Cui Zhide	China	1:30:21.3	
2nd place, silver medalist(s)	Shin Il-Yong	South Korea	1:31:33.4	
3rd place, bronze medalist(s)	Rustam Kuvatov	Kazakhstan	1:32:37.5	
4	Mabrook Saleh Nasser Mohamed	Qatar	1:34:43.4	
5	Kristian Tobing Lumban	Indonesia	1:35:08.3	
6	Jibreel Rahmat Khan	Qatar	1:36:45.6	
7	Lo Choon Sieng	Malaysia	1:39:17.7	
8	Mohd Sharrulhaizy Abdul Rahman	Malaysia	1:48:01.0	
	Dong Jimin	China	DNS	
	Mohamed Jomaa	Syria	DNS	
