= 2002 Asian Athletics Championships – Men's 20 kilometres walk =

The men's 20 kilometres walk event at the 2002 Asian Athletics Championships was held in Colombo, Sri Lanka on 10 August.

== Results ==
Rank	Name	Nationality	Time	Notes
1st place, gold medalist(s)	Eiichi Yoshizawa	Japan	1:26:51	
2nd place, silver medalist(s)	Toshihito Fujinohara	Japan	1:28:06	
3rd place, bronze medalist(s)	Shin Il-Yong	South Korea	1:31:07	
4	Gurdev Singh	India	1:32:53	SB
5	Waleed Ahmed Al-Sabahy	Qatar	1:33:49	
6	B.N. Nayananada	Sri Lanka	1:35:18	SB
7	Fang Mingbiao	China	1:36:51	
8	Sergey Bantikov	Tajikistan	1:40:43	PB
9	O.G. Somasooriya	Sri Lanka	1:47:21	PB
	Chang Ming	China	DNF	
	Harbas Narinder Singh	Malaysia	DNF	
	M.D. Sunil	Sri Lanka	DNF	
