= Silviu Casandra =

Romanian racewalker

Personal information
- Born: October 27, 1975 (age 51)

Sport
- Sport: Race walking

Silviu Casandra (born October 27, 1975) is a male race walker from Romania.

== Doping ==
Casandra tested positive at Gran Premio Cantones in Spain 16 March 2002 and received a two-year doping ban.

== Achievements ==
Year	Competition	Venue	Position	Event	Notes
Representing Romania
1994	World Junior Championships	Lisbon, Portugal	20th	10,000m	43:41.40
1997	European U23 Championships	Turku, Finland	12th	20 km	1:27:18
1999	Universiade	Palma de Mallorca, Spain	10th	20 km	1:30:59
2000	European Race Walking Cup	Eisenhüttenstadt, Germany	23rd	20 km	1:23:51
2001	European Race Walking Cup	Dudince, Slovakia	13th	20 km	1:22:34
2001	World Championships	Edmonton, Canada	22nd	20 km	1:29:49
2001	Universiade	Beijing, China	14th	20 km	1:30:50
2005	World Championships	Helsinki, Finland	19th	20 km	1:23:46
2006	European Championships	Gothenburg, Sweden	15th	20 km	1:26:36
2010	European Championships	Barcelona, Spain	15th	20 km	1:24:51
