= Alexandr Polukhin =

Kazakhstani water polo player

Personal information
- Full name: Aleksandr Viktorovich Polukhin
- Nationality: Kazakhstan
- Born: 15 October 1961 (age 65) Alma-Ata, Kazakh SSR, Soviet Union
- Height: 1.87 m (6 ft 2 in)
- Weight: 94 kg (207 lb)

Sport
- Sport: Water polo
- Position: goalkeeper
National team
- Years: Team
- ?: Kazakhstan
Medal record
Representing Kazakhstan
Asian Games
Gold medal – first place	2002 Busan	Team competition

Aleksandr Viktorovich Polukhin (Александр Викторович Полухин, born 15 October 1961) is a Kazakhstani water polo player. He was a member of the Kazakhstan men's national water polo team, playing as a goalkeeper.

Polukhin holds the record for the oldest water polo player to debut at the Olympics. On 13 August 2004, he made his Olympic debut at the age of 42 years and 303 days in Athens.

== See also ==
- Kazakhstan men's Olympic water polo team records and statistics
- List of men's Olympic water polo tournament goalkeepers
