= Cui Zhide =

Chinese race walker

Medal record

Men's athletics

Representing China

Asian Championships
Gold medal – first place	2007 Amman	20 km walk

Cui Zhide (born 11 January 1983, in Henan) is a Chinese race walker.

== Achievements ==
Year	Competition	Venue	Position	Event	Notes
Representing China
2004	World Race Walking Cup	Naumburg, Germany	7th	50 km	3:52:24
2007	Asian Championships	Amman, Jordan	1st	20 km	1:30:21.3
2008	World Race Walking Cup	Cheboksary, Russia	78th	20 km	1:31:46
2012	World Race Walking Cup	Saransk, Russia	24th	50 km	3:57:23
