= 1994 World Junior Championships in Athletics – Men's 10,000 metres walk =

The men's 10,000 metres walk event at the 1994 World Junior Championships in Athletics was held in Lisbon, Portugal, at Estádio Universitário de Lisboa on 21 July.

== Medalists ==
Gold	Jorge Segura; Mexico
Silver	Yevgeniy Shmalyuk; Russia
Bronze	Artur Meliashkevich; Belarus

== Results ==
=== Final ===
21 July

Rank	Name	Nationality	Time	Notes
1st place, gold medalist(s)	Jorge Segura	Mexico	40:26.93	
2nd place, silver medalist(s)	Yevgeniy Shmalyuk	Russia	40:32.72	
3rd place, bronze medalist(s)	Artur Meliashkevich	Belarus	40:35.52	
4	Sebastiano Catania	Italy	40:58.46	
5	Daisuke Ikeshima	Japan	41:01.97	
6	Alejandro López	Mexico	41:28.14	
7	Oleg Ishutkin	Russia	41:46.30	
8	Dion Russell	Australia	41:50.70	
9	Andreas Erm	Germany	42:21.72	
10	Marcos Carracedo	Spain	42:26.03	
11	João Vieira	Portugal	42:26.17	
12	Peter Barto	Slovakia	42:28.55	
13	Tobias Persson	Sweden	42:35.67	
14	José Alejandro Cambil	Spain	42:47.62	
15	Lorenzo Civallero	Italy	42:58.34	
16	Lukasz Szela	Poland	43:04.26	
17	Vitaliy Stetsyshyn	Ukraine	43:10.87	
18	Toshihito Fujinohara	Japan	43:11.33	
19	Erik Kalina	Slovakia	43:31.47	
20	Silviu Casandra	Romania	43:41.40	
21	Moncef Kessab	Algeria	43:42.60	
22	Sérgio Vieira	Portugal	43:50.07	
23	Arne Martinsen	Norway	43:56.48	
24	Luke Adams	Australia	44:09.59	
25	Tony Sargisson	New Zealand	44:55.27	
26	Balmore Elias	El Salvador	44:55.55	
27	Edson do Prado	Brazil	45:17.82	
28	Justin Marrujo	United States	45:22.40	
29	Antony Gillet	France	46:25.35	
30	Arian Rödel	Germany	47:00.45	
	Omar Aguirre	Ecuador	DQ	
	Aigars Fadejevs	Latvia	DQ	
	William Vanaxen	United States	DNF	

== Participation ==
According to an unofficial count, 33 athletes from 23 countries participated in the event.

- Algeria (1)
- Australia (2)
- Belarus (1)
- Brazil (1)
- Ecuador (1)
- El Salvador (1)
- France (1)
- Germany (2)
- Italy (2)
- Japan (2)
- Latvia (1)
- Mexico (2)
- New Zealand (1)
- Norway (1)
- Poland (1)
- Portugal (2)
- Romania (1)
- Russia (2)
- Slovakia (2)
- Spain (2)
- Sweden (1)
- Ukraine (1)
- United States (2)
