= 2012 Asian Water Polo Championship =

- Host city: Tokyo, Japan
- Dates: 24–27 January 2012

The 2012 Asian Water Polo Championship for men and women was held from 24 to 27 January 2012 at the Chiba International General Swimming Center near Tokyo, Japan.

== Road to the 2012 Olympics ==
The winners of this championship (both men and women) qualified directly for the 2012 Olympic Games in London. The second- and third-placed teams (both men and women) were eligible to participate in the World Olympic qualification tournament, held 1–8 April 2012 for men in Edmonton, Alberta, Canada, and 15–22 April for women in Trieste, Italy. However, only the Kazakhstan women's team applied to take part.

== Results ==
=== Men ===
Team qualified for the 2012 Summer Olympics

Team	Pld	W	D	L	GF	GA	GD	Pts
Kazakhstan	3	3	0	0	24	16	+8	9
China	3	2	0	1	37	18	+19	6
Japan	3	1	0	2	32	15	+17	3
Kuwait	3	0	0	3	11	55	−44	0

25 January 2012; 17:30	Report	China	7–8	Kazakhstan	Chiba International General Swimming Center, Tokyo; Referees: Flahive (AUS), Juhasz (HUN)
25 January 2012; 17:30	Report	Score by quarters: 2–3, 0–2, 1–1, 4–2			Chiba International General Swimming Center, Tokyo; Referees: Flahive (AUS), Juhasz (HUN)
25 January 2012; 17:30	Report	Zhongxing, Ning 2	Goals	Zhilyayev 3	Chiba International General Swimming Center, Tokyo; Referees: Flahive (AUS), Juhasz (HUN)

25 January 2012; 19:30	Report	Japan	22–2	Kuwait	Chiba International General Swimming Center, Tokyo; Referees: Shiwei (CHN), Salnichenko (KAZ)
25 January 2012; 19:30	Report	Score by quarters: 4–0, 3–1, 7–0, 8–1			Chiba International General Swimming Center, Tokyo; Referees: Shiwei (CHN), Salnichenko (KAZ)
25 January 2012; 19:30	Report	Kan 4	Goals	Abdulaziz, Mohammad 1	Chiba International General Swimming Center, Tokyo; Referees: Shiwei (CHN), Salnichenko (KAZ)

26 January 2012; 17:30	Report	China	23–4	Kuwait	Chiba International General Swimming Center, Tokyo; Referees: Fukumoto, Orikasa (JPN)
26 January 2012; 17:30	Report	Score by quarters: 6–1, 7–2, 8–0, 2–1			Chiba International General Swimming Center, Tokyo; Referees: Fukumoto, Orikasa (JPN)
26 January 2012; 17:30	Report	Zhongxing 9	Goals	Mohammad 2	Chiba International General Swimming Center, Tokyo; Referees: Fukumoto, Orikasa (JPN)

26 January 2012; 19:30	Report	Japan	4–6	Kazakhstan	Chiba International General Swimming Center, Tokyo; Referees: Flahive (AUS), Juhasz (HUN)
26 January 2012; 19:30	Report	Score by quarters: 1–1, 2–2, 1–2, 0–1			Chiba International General Swimming Center, Tokyo; Referees: Flahive (AUS), Juhasz (HUN)
26 January 2012; 19:30	Report	Yusuke 2	Goals	Ushakov 3	Chiba International General Swimming Center, Tokyo; Referees: Flahive (AUS), Juhasz (HUN)

27 January 2012; 17:30	Report	Kuwait	5–10	Kazakhstan	Chiba International General Swimming Center, Tokyo; Referees: Shiwei (CHN), Fukumoto (JPN)
27 January 2012; 17:30	Report	Score by quarters: 1–3, 0–3, 1–3, 3–1			Chiba International General Swimming Center, Tokyo; Referees: Shiwei (CHN), Fukumoto (JPN)
27 January 2012; 17:30	Report	Abdulaziz 3	Goals	Manafov 3	Chiba International General Swimming Center, Tokyo; Referees: Shiwei (CHN), Fukumoto (JPN)

27 January 2012; 19:30	Report	Japan	6–7	China	Chiba International General Swimming Center, Tokyo; Referees: Flahive (AUS), Juhasz (HUN)
27 January 2012; 19:30	Report	Score by quarters: 1–3, 0–1, 2–1, 3–2			Chiba International General Swimming Center, Tokyo; Referees: Flahive (AUS), Juhasz (HUN)
27 January 2012; 19:30	Report	Hiroki 2	Goals	Feihu 2	Chiba International General Swimming Center, Tokyo; Referees: Flahive (AUS), Juhasz (HUN)

=== Women ===
Team qualified for the 2012 Summer Olympics
Team qualified for the World Qualification Tournament

Team	Pld	W	D	L	GF	GA	GD	Pts
China	2	2	0	0	39	14	+25	6
Kazakhstan	2	1	0	1	20	29	−9	3
Japan	2	0	0	2	14	30	−16	0

24 January 2012; 11:30	Report	Kazakhstan	8–21	China	Chiba International General Swimming Center, Tokyo; Referees: Flahive (AUS), Juhasz (HUN)
24 January 2012; 11:30	Report	Score by quarters: 2–6, 1–5, 4–4, 1–6			Chiba International General Swimming Center, Tokyo; Referees: Flahive (AUS), Juhasz (HUN)
24 January 2012; 11:30	Report	Aizhan 3	Goals	Fei, Jin 5	Chiba International General Swimming Center, Tokyo; Referees: Flahive (AUS), Juhasz (HUN)

25 January 2012; 11:30	Report	Japan	8–12	Kazakhstan	Chiba International General Swimming Center, Tokyo; Referees: Flahive (AUS), Juhasz (HUN)
25 January 2012; 11:30	Report	Score by quarters: 3–6, 2–1, 3–3, 0–2			Chiba International General Swimming Center, Tokyo; Referees: Flahive (AUS), Juhasz (HUN)
25 January 2012; 11:30	Report	Yumi 3	Goals	Assel 3	Chiba International General Swimming Center, Tokyo; Referees: Flahive (AUS), Juhasz (HUN)

26 January 2012; 11:30	Report	Japan	6–18	China	Chiba International General Swimming Center, Tokyo; Referees: Flahive (AUS), Anbar (KUW)
26 January 2012; 11:30	Report	Score by quarters: 1–5, 1–6, 3–4, 1–3			Chiba International General Swimming Center, Tokyo; Referees: Flahive (AUS), Anbar (KUW)
26 January 2012; 11:30	Report	Yumi 3	Goals	Yujun 4	Chiba International General Swimming Center, Tokyo; Referees: Flahive (AUS), Anbar (KUW)
