= Daisuke Ikeshima =

Japanese race walker

Personal information
- Born: January 30, 1975 (age 51) Ishikawa, Japan

Sport
- Sport: Track and field
Medal record
Representing Japan
Summer Universiade
Bronze medal – third place	1999 Palma de Mallorca	20km walk
East Asian Games
Silver medal – second place	1997 Busan	20km walk

Daisuke Ikeshima (Japanese: 池島 大介; born January 30, 1975) is a retired Japanese male race walker. He set his personal best (1:19.42) in the men's 20 km on January 30, 2000, in Kobe.

== International competitions ==
Representing Japan
Year	Competition	Venue	Position	Event	Notes
1992	World Junior Championships	Seoul, South Korea	7th	10,000m	41:45.18
1994	World Junior Championships	Lisbon, Portugal	5th	10,000m	41:01.97
1995	World Championships	Gothenburg, Sweden	35th	20 km	1:37:11
1996	Olympic Games	Atlanta, United States	22nd	20 km	1:24:54
1997	World Race Walking Cup	Poděbrady, Czech Republic	16th	20 km	1:20:27
1997	East Asian Games	Busan, South Korea	2nd	20,000 m	1:23:59.99
1999	World Race Walking Cup	Mézidon-Canon, France	42nd	20 km	1:28:10
1999	Universiade	Palma de Mallorca, Spain	3rd	20 km	1:26:01
1999	World Championships	Seville, Spain	17th	20 km	1:29:03
2000	Olympic Games	Sydney, Australia	27th	20 km	1:25:34
