= Alexandr Shidlovskiy =

Kazakhstani water polo player

Personal information
- Full name: Aleksandr Aleksandrovich Shidlovsky
- Nationality: Kazakhstan
- Born: 14 July 1974 (age 52) Russian SFSR, Soviet Union
- Height: 1.87 m (6 ft 2 in)
- Weight: 88 kg (194 lb)

Sport
- Sport: Water polo
- Position: driver
National team
- Years: Team
- ?: Kazakhstan
Medal record
Representing Kazakhstan
Asian Games
Gold medal – first place	2002 Busan	Team competition

Aleksandr Aleksandrovich Shidlovsky (Александр Александрович Шидловский; born 14 July 1974) is a Russian-born Kazakhstani water polo player. He was a member of the Kazakhstan men's national water polo team, playing as a driver. He was a part of the team at the 2004 Summer Olympics.
