= Water polo at the 1998 Asian Games =

- Venue: Thammasat Aquatic Center
- Dates: 11–19 December 1998
- Nations: 9

Water Polo was contested by men's teams at the 1998 Asian Games in Bangkok, Thailand from December 11 to December 19, 1998. All games were staged at the Thammasat Aquatic Center.

== Schedule ==
P	Preliminary round	●	Final round	●	Last round

Event↓/Date →	11th Fri	12th Sat	13th Sun	14th Mon	15th Tue	16th Wed	17th Thu	18th Fri	19th Sat
Men	P	P	P		●	●	●	●	●

== Medalists ==
Event	Gold	Silver	Bronze
Men	Kazakhstan; Konstantin Chernov; Roman Chentsov; Sergey Drozdov; Alexandr Elke; Mikhail Klochkov; Askar Orazalinov; Yevgeniy Prokhin; Artemiy Sevostyanov; Sergey Sevostyanov; Alexandr Shvedov; Igor Zagoruyko; Ivan Zaitsev; Yevgeniy Zhilyayev	Uzbekistan; Evgeniy Belov; Rinat Galeev; Denis Galkin; Evgeniy Kochergin; Aleksandr Komarov; Oleg Kornienko; Oleg Koryakov; Rais Kovyazin; Sergey Maximov; Ruslan Nasirov; Sergey Voronin; Aleksandr Yashnov; Aleksandr Yugai	China; Bai Jun; Cai Shuli; Chen Yaohua; Feng Zewen; Han Zhidong; He Qingzu; Hong Xicheng; Huang Yunquan; Li Wenhua; Shen Jie; Xu Guanghao; Yu Lijun; Zhou Hao

== Results ==
=== Preliminary round ===
==== Group A ====
Pos	Team	Pld	W	D	L	GF	GA	GD	Pts	Qualification
1	Japan	2	2	0	0	39	8	+31	4	Final round
2	Iran	2	1	0	1	22	15	+7	2	Final round
3	Kuwait	2	0	0	2	8	46	−38	0	Classification 7th–9th

Source: Results

11 December	Japan	31–1	Kuwait	Thammasat Aquatic Center, Bangkok
11 December	Score by quarters: 8–0, 10–0, 6–1, 7–0			Thammasat Aquatic Center, Bangkok

12 December	Iran	7–8	Japan	Thammasat Aquatic Center, Bangkok
12 December	Score by quarters: 1–0, 1–2, 4–4, 1–2			Thammasat Aquatic Center, Bangkok

13 December	Kuwait	7–15	Iran	Thammasat Aquatic Center, Bangkok
13 December	Score by quarters: 2–4, 2–5, 2–0, 1–6			Thammasat Aquatic Center, Bangkok

==== Group B ====
Pos	Team	Pld	W	D	L	GF	GA	GD	Pts	Qualification
1	Uzbekistan	2	2	0	0	37	10	+27	4	Final round
2	China	2	1	0	1	29	12	+17	2	Final round
3	Hong Kong	2	0	0	2	5	49	−44	0	Classification 7th–9th

Source: Results

11 December	Uzbekistan	27–3	Hong Kong	Thammasat Aquatic Center, Bangkok
11 December	Score by quarters: 10–0, 6–0, 4–1, 7–2			Thammasat Aquatic Center, Bangkok

12 December	China	7–10	Uzbekistan	Thammasat Aquatic Center, Bangkok
12 December	Score by quarters: 0–3, 3–3, 2–3, 2–1			Thammasat Aquatic Center, Bangkok

13 December	Hong Kong	2–22	China	Thammasat Aquatic Center, Bangkok
13 December	Score by quarters: 0–3, 0–6, 1–7, 1–6			Thammasat Aquatic Center, Bangkok

==== Group C ====
Pos	Team	Pld	W	D	L	GF	GA	GD	Pts	Qualification
1	Kazakhstan	2	2	0	0	28	4	+24	4	Final round
2	Singapore	2	1	0	1	9	20	−11	2	Final round
3	Thailand	2	0	0	2	7	20	−13	0	Classification 7th–9th

Source: Results

11 December	Singapore	8–4	Thailand	Thammasat Aquatic Center, Bangkok
11 December	Score by quarters: 2–1, 2–0, 3–1, 1–2			Thammasat Aquatic Center, Bangkok

12 December	Kazakhstan	16–1	Singapore	Thammasat Aquatic Center, Bangkok
12 December	Score by quarters: 5–0, 3–0, 4–0, 4–1			Thammasat Aquatic Center, Bangkok

13 December	Thailand	3–12	Kazakhstan	Thammasat Aquatic Center, Bangkok
13 December	Score by quarters: 0–4, 1–2, 2–3, 0–3			Thammasat Aquatic Center, Bangkok

=== Classification 7th–9th ===
Pos	Team	Pld	W	D	L	GF	GA	GD	Pts
1	Thailand	2	2	0	0	19	14	+5	4
2	Hong Kong	2	1	0	1	12	13	−1	2
3	Kuwait	2	0	0	2	17	21	−4	0

Source: Results

15 December	Kuwait	7–8	Hong Kong	Thammasat Aquatic Center, Bangkok
15 December	Score by quarters: 3–2, 1–2, 1–1, 2–3			Thammasat Aquatic Center, Bangkok

16 December	Thailand	13–10	Kuwait	Thammasat Aquatic Center, Bangkok
16 December	Score by quarters: 4–1, 2–3, 3–1, 4–5			Thammasat Aquatic Center, Bangkok

17 December	Hong Kong	4–6	Thailand	Thammasat Aquatic Center, Bangkok
17 December	Score by quarters: 2–2, 0–2, 1–1, 1–1			Thammasat Aquatic Center, Bangkok

=== Final round ===
- The results and the points of the matches between the same teams that were already played during the preliminary round shall be taken into account for the final round.

Pos	Team	Pld	W	D	L	GF	GA	GD	Pts
1	Kazakhstan	5	5	0	0	62	20	+42	10
2	Uzbekistan	5	3	1	1	60	34	+26	7
3	China	5	3	0	2	48	33	+15	6
4	Japan	5	2	1	2	40	35	+5	5
5	Iran	5	1	0	4	37	50	−13	2
6	Singapore	5	0	0	5	13	88	−75	0

Source: Results

15 December	Singapore	6–13	Iran	Thammasat Aquatic Center, Bangkok
15 December	Score by quarters: 2–5, 2–2, 1–3, 1–3			Thammasat Aquatic Center, Bangkok

15 December	Japan	8–8	Uzbekistan	Thammasat Aquatic Center, Bangkok
15 December	Score by quarters: 1–2, 2–1, 2–3, 3–2			Thammasat Aquatic Center, Bangkok

16 December	Kazakhstan	12–3	China	Thammasat Aquatic Center, Bangkok
16 December	Score by quarters: 4–1, 3–0, 2–1, 3–1			Thammasat Aquatic Center, Bangkok

16 December	Singapore	2–15	Japan	Thammasat Aquatic Center, Bangkok
16 December	Score by quarters: 0–4, 1–4, 0–3, 1–4			Thammasat Aquatic Center, Bangkok

17 December	Kazakhstan	9–7	Uzbekistan	Thammasat Aquatic Center, Bangkok
17 December	Score by quarters: 4–1, 2–1, 2–3, 1–2			Thammasat Aquatic Center, Bangkok

17 December	China	12–5	Iran	Thammasat Aquatic Center, Bangkok
17 December	Score by quarters: 2–2, 3–1, 3–2, 4–0			Thammasat Aquatic Center, Bangkok

18 December	Singapore	3–24	Uzbekistan	Thammasat Aquatic Center, Bangkok
18 December	Score by quarters: 1–3, 0–5, 0–8, 2–8			Thammasat Aquatic Center, Bangkok

18 December	Japan	5–6	China	Thammasat Aquatic Center, Bangkok
18 December	Score by quarters: 1–2, 1–3, 0–0, 3–1			Thammasat Aquatic Center, Bangkok

18 December	Kazakhstan	13–5	Iran	Thammasat Aquatic Center, Bangkok
18 December	Score by quarters: 3–0, 4–3, 3–1, 3–1			Thammasat Aquatic Center, Bangkok

19 December	China	20–1	Singapore	Thammasat Aquatic Center, Bangkok
19 December	Score by quarters: 5–0, 4–0, 4–1, 7–0			Thammasat Aquatic Center, Bangkok

19 December	Uzbekistan	11–7	Iran	Thammasat Aquatic Center, Bangkok
19 December	Score by quarters: 3–1, 2–3, 3–2, 3–1			Thammasat Aquatic Center, Bangkok

19 December	Kazakhstan	12–4	Japan	Thammasat Aquatic Center, Bangkok
19 December	Score by quarters: 1–1, 4–1, 3–1, 4–1			Thammasat Aquatic Center, Bangkok

== Final standing ==
Rank	Team	Pld	W	D	L
1st place, gold medalist(s)	Kazakhstan	6	6	0	0
2nd place, silver medalist(s)	Uzbekistan	6	4	1	1
3rd place, bronze medalist(s)	China	6	4	0	2
4	Japan	6	3	1	2
5	Iran	6	2	0	4
6	Singapore	6	1	0	5
7	Thailand	4	2	0	2
8	Hong Kong	4	1	0	3
9	Kuwait	4	0	0	4
