= Rezeda Aleyeva =

Kazakhstani water polo player

Personal information
- Nationality: Kazakhstani
- Born: 13 December 1967 (age 58) Ulyanovsk, Russian SFSR, Soviet Union

Sport
- Sport: Water polo

Rezeda Aleyeva (Резеда Минихайдеровна Алеева, born 13 December 1967) is a Kazakhstani water polo player. She competed in the women's tournament at the 2000 Summer Olympics.
