= Nataliya Galkina =

Kazakhstani water polo player

Personal information
- Nationality: Kazakhstani
- Born: 11 August 1973 (age 51); Karaganda, Kazakh SSR, Soviet Union

Sport
- Sport: Water polo

Nataliya Galkina (born 11 August 1973) is a Kazakhstani water polo player. She competed in the women's tournament at the 2000 Summer Olympics.
