= Alexandr Elke =

Kazakhstani water polo player

Personal information
- Full name: Alexandr Rudolfovich Elke
- Nationality: Kazakhstan
- Born: 18 January 1971 (age 55) Alma-Ata, Kazakh SSR, Soviet Union
- Height: 1.90 m (6 ft 3 in)
- Weight: 95 kg (209 lb)

Sport
- Sport: Water polo
- Position: centre back

Senior clubs
- Years: Team
- –: Real Canoe NC
National team
- Years: Team
- –: Kazakhstan

Alexandr Rudolfovich Elke (Александр Рудольфович Эльке, born 18 January 1971) is a Kazakhstani water polo player. He was a member of the Kazakhstan men's national water polo team, playing as a centre back. He was a part of the team at the 2000 Summer Olympics and 2004 Summer Olympics. On club level he played for Real Canoe NC in Spain.
