= Ivan Zaitsev (water polo) =

Kazakhstani water polo player

Ivan Zaytsev
Personal information
- Full name: Ivan Vladislavovich Zaitsev
- Nationality: Kazakhstan
- Born: 11 March 1975 (age 51) Norilsk, Soviet Union
- Height: 1.86 m (6 ft 1 in)
- Weight: 88 kg (194 lb)

Sport
- Sport: Water polo
- Position: driver

Senior clubs
- Years: Team
- ?-?: Dynamo Moscow
National team
- Years: Team
- ?-?: Kazakhstan
Medal record
Representing Kazakhstan
Asian Games
Gold medal – first place	1998 Bangkok	Team competition
Gold medal – first place	2002 Busan	Team competition
Bronze medal – third place	2006 Doha	Team competition

Ivan Vladislavovich Zaitsev (Иван Владиславович Зайцев, born 11 March 1975 in Norilsk) is a Russian born Kazakhstani male water polo player. He was a member of the Kazakhstan men's national water polo team, playing as a driver. He was a part of the team at the 2000 Summer Olympics and 2004 Summer Olympics. On club level he played for Dynamo Moscow in Russia.
