= Konstantin Chernov =

Kazakhstani water polo player

Personal information
- Nationality: Kazakhstani
- Born: 24 December 1967 (age 58) Karaganda, Kazakh SSR, Soviet Union

Sport
- Sport: Water polo
Medal record
Representing Kazakhstan
Asian Games
Gold medal – first place	1994 Hiroshima	Team competition
Gold medal – first place	1998 Bangkok	Team competition

Konstantin Chernov (Константин Васильевич Чернов, born 24 December 1967) is a Kazakhstani water polo player. He competed in the men's tournament at the 2000 Summer Olympics.

== See also ==
- Kazakhstan men's Olympic water polo team records and statistics
- List of men's Olympic water polo tournament goalkeepers
