= Roman Chentsov =

Kazakhstani water polo player

Personal information
- Nationality: Kazakhstani
- Born: 16 January 1978 (age 48) Alma-Ata, Kazakh SSR, Soviet Union

Sport
- Sport: Water polo
Medal record
Representing Kazakhstan
Asian Games
Gold medal – first place	1998 Bangkok	Team competition

Roman Chentsov (Роман Васильевич Ченцов, born 16 January 1978) is a Kazakhstani water polo player. He competed in the men's tournament at the 2000 Summer Olympics.
