= Yuliya Pyryseva =

Russian-born Kazakhstani water polo player

Personal information
- Nationality: Soviet; Russian; Kazakhstani
- Born: 22 December 1967 (age 57); Miass, Russian SFSR, Soviet Union

Sport
- Sport: Water polo

Yuliya Pyryseva (born 22 December 1967) is a Russian-born Kazakhstani water polo player. She competed in the women's tournament at the 2000 Summer Olympics.
