= Sergey Drozdov =

Kazakhstani water polo player

Personal information
- Born: 23 October 1969 (age 56) Alma-Ata, Kazakh SSR, Soviet Union
Medal record
Men's water polo
Representing Kazakhstan
Asian Games
| Gold medal – first place | 1994 Hiroshima | Team |
| Gold medal – first place | 1998 Bangkok | Team |
| Gold medal – first place | 2002 Busan | Team |

Sergey Mikhailovich Drozdov (Russian: Сергей Михайлович Дроздо́в; born 23 October 1969) is a retired Kazakhstani professional water polo player who last competed at the 2002 Asian Games as a member of the Kazakhstan men's national water polo team. He is currently serves as a coach of the Kazakhstan men's national team and coach of the team Astana SK in Astana.

== Ranks ==
- World class master of sports
- Honored coach of the Republic of Kazakhstan

== Achievements ==
=== As player ===
==== Water Polo Club Spartak Volgograd ====
- 2-fold winner Cup of Russia (2005, 2007)
- Champion of Russia (2008–09)

==== Hapoel Tel Aviv ====
- 3-fold winner Cup of Israel
- 3-fold Champion of Israel

==== Kazakhstan men's national water polo team ====
- 3-fold champion Asian Games (1994, 1998, 2002)
- 3-fold champion of Asia (1995, 2001, 2003)
- Champion of Asian Beach Games (2008)
- Participant of the Olympic Games (2000, 2004)

=== As coach ===
==== Kazakhstan men's national water polo team ====
- Champion of Asian Games (2010)
- Champion of Asia (2012)
- Runners - up of the championship of Asia (2008)
- Champion of Asian Beach Games (2010)
