= Jorge Segura (race walker) =

Mexican male former racewalker (born 1975)

Jorge Segura (born 23 April 1975) is a Mexican male former racewalker. He was the gold medallist at the 1994 World Junior Championships in Athletics. He also won senior gold medals in the 20,000 metres track walk at the 1996 Ibero-American Championships in Athletics and the 20 kilometres race walk at the 1995 Central American and Caribbean Championships in Athletics. He was a four-time participant at the Pan American Race Walking Cup. Segura retired from the sport after 2009.

He holds personal bests of 1:22:53 hours for the 20 km distance and 4:13:54 hours for the 50 kilometres race walk.

== Personal bests ==
- 10,000 metres race walk – 40:26.93 (1994)
- 10 kilometres race walk – 41:28 (2005)
- 20 kilometres race walk – 1:22:53 (2005)
- 50 kilometres race walk – 4:13:54 (2007)

== International competitions ==
Year	Competition	Venue	Position	Event	Notes
1994	World Junior Championships	Lisbon, Portugal	1st	10,000 m walk	40:26.93
1994	Pan American Race Walking Cup	Atlanta, Georgia	15th	20 km walk	1:31:13
1995	CAC Championships	Guatemala City, Guatemala	1st	20 km walk	1:25:08 A
1996	Pan American Race Walking Cup	Manaus, Brazil	—	20 km walk	DQ
1996	Ibero-American Championships	Medellín, Colombia	1st	20,000 m walk	1:25:25.21
2000	Pan American Race Walking Cup	Poza Rica, Mexico	—	20 km walk	DQ
2000	Ibero-American Championships	Rio de Janeiro, Brazil	—	20,000 m walk	DQ
2007	Pan American Race Walking Cup	Balneário Camboriú, Brazil	—	50 km walk	DQ
