= Rustam Kuvatov =

Kazakhstani racewalker (born 1977)

Rustam Kovatov
Personal information
- Full name: Rustam Barotovich Kuvatov
- Nationality: Kazakhstan
- Born: 9 November 1977 (age 48) Pavlodar, Kazakh SSR, Soviet Union
- Height: 1.80 m (5 ft 11 in)
- Weight: 70 kg (154 lb)

Sport
- Sport: Athletics
- Event: Race walking

Achievements and titles
- Personal bests: 20 km walk: 1:23:16 (2008); 50 km walk: 3:59:57 (2004)
Medal record
Men's athletics
Representing Kazakhstan
Asian Championships
Bronze medal – third place	2007 Amman	20 km walk

Rustam Barotovich Kuvatov (Kazakh: Рустам Баротович Куватов; born November 9, 1977, in Pavlodar) is a Kazakhstani race walker. He set a personal best time of 1:23:16 by finishing twelfth for the 20 km race walk at the Kazakh national walking championships. Kuvatov made his official debut for the 2004 Summer Olympics in Athens, where he placed thirty-seventh in the men's 50 km race walk, with a time of 4:13:40.

At the 2008 Summer Olympics, Kuvatov competed this time for the men's 20 km race walk. During the competition, he set an early pace and was narrowly ahead in the 4 km lap after the athletes had left the stadium. Reaching the 8 km lap, Kuvatov's strong lead came to an end, as he was passed by several race walkers including Ivano Brugnetti of Italy, and Paquillo Fernández of Spain, both of whom won gold and silver in the previous Olympics. Kuvatov entered the stadium and finished the entire run in forty-second place by ten seconds behind Serbia's Predrag Filipović, with a time of 1:28:25.
