= Yuriy Smoloviy =

Kazakhstani water polo player

Yury Smolovoy
Personal information
- Full name: Yuriy Vasilyevich Smolovoy
- Nationality: Kazakhstan
- Born: 9 April 1970 (age 56) Volgograd, Soviet Union
- Height: 1.96 m (6 ft 5 in)
- Weight: 118 kg (260 lb)

Sport
- Sport: Water polo
- Position: centre forward

Senior clubs
- Years: Team
- ?-?: Lukoil-Spartak
National team
- Years: Team
- ?-? ?-?: Russia; Kazakhstan

Yuriy Vasilyevich Smoloviy (Юрий Васильевич Смоловый, born 9 April 1970) is a Russian Kazakhstani male water polo player. He was a member of the Russia men's national water polo team and Kazakhstan men's national water polo team, playing as a centre forward. He was a part of the Russian team at the 1996 Summer Olympics and of the Kazakhstani team at the 2000 Summer Olympics and 2004 Summer Olympics. On club level he played for Lukoil-Spartak in Russia.

== See also ==
- List of World Aquatics Championships medalists in water polo
