= Alexandr Shvedov =

Kazakhstani water polo player

Personal information
- Native name: Александр Викторович Шведов
- Full name: Aleksandr Viktorovich Shvedov
- Born: 11 April 1973 (age 53) Alma-Ata, Kazakh SSR, Soviet Union
- Height: 197 cm (6 ft 6 in)
- Weight: 83 kg (183 lb)
Medal record
Men's water polo
Representing Kazakhstan
Asian Games
Gold medal – first place	1998 Bangkok	Team
Gold medal – first place	2002 Busan	Team
Gold medal – first place	2010 Guanzhou	Team
Bronze medal – third place	2006 Doha	Team
Asian Beach Games
Gold medal – first place	2008 Bali	Team
Gold medal – first place	2014 Phuket	Team

Alexandr Shvedov (Александр Шведов, born 11 April 1973) is a Kazakhstani water polo goalkeeper. At the 2012 Summer Olympics, he competed for the Kazakhstan men's national water polo team in the men's event. He is 6 ft 6 inches tall.

== See also ==
- Kazakhstan men's Olympic water polo team records and statistics
- List of men's Olympic water polo tournament goalkeepers
