= Artemiy Sevostyanov =

Kazakhstani water polo player

Personal information
- Full name: Artemy Viktorovich Sevostyanov
- Nationality: Kazakhstan
- Born: 2 February 1973 (age 53) Quaraghandy, Kazakh SSR, Soviet Union
- Height: 1.88 m (6 ft 2 in)
- Weight: 92 kg (203 lb)

Sport
- Sport: Water polo
- Position: centre back

Senior clubs
- Years: Team
- ?-?: Sintez Kazan
National team
- Years: Team
- ?-?: Kazakhstan
Medal record
Representing Kazakhstan
Asian Games
Gold medal – first place	1994 Hiroshima	Team competition
Gold medal – first place	1998 Bangkok	Team competition
Gold medal – first place	2002 Busan	Team competition

Artemy Viktorovich Sevostyanov (Артемий Викторович Севостьянов; born 2 February 1973) is a Kazakhstani male water polo player. He was a member of the Kazakhstan men's national water polo team, playing as a centre back. He was a part of the team at the 2000 Summer Olympics and 2004 Summer Olympics. On club level he played for Sintez Kazan in Russia.
