= Larisa Olkhina =

Kazakhstani water polo player

Personal information
- Nationality: Kazakhstani
- Born: 9 November 1968 (age 57) Alma-Ata, Kazakh SSR, Soviet Union

Sport
- Sport: Water polo

Larisa Olkhina (Лариса Аркадьевна Ольхина, born 9 November 1968) is a Kazakhstani water polo player. She competed in the women's tournament at the 2000 Summer Olympics.
