= Yekaterina Gerzanich =

Kazakhstani water polo player

Personal information
- Nationality: Kazakhstani
- Born: 18 May 1972 (age 53) Russian SFSR, Soviet Union

Sport
- Sport: Water polo

Yekaterina Gerzanich (Екатерина Вадимовна Герзанич, born 18 May 1972) is a Kazakhstani water polo player. She competed in the women's tournament at the 2000 Summer Olympics.
