= Tatyana Gubina =

Kazakhstani water polo player

Personal information
- Full name: Tatyana Dmitriyevna Gubina
- Nationality: Kazakhstan
- Born: 15 December 1977 (age 48) Temirtau, Kazakh SSR, Soviet Union
- Height: 1.78 m (5 ft 10 in)
- Weight: 67 kg (148 lb)

Sport
- Sport: Water polo
- Position: centre back

Senior clubs
- Years: Team
- ?-?: Eurasia Rakhat
National team
- Years: Team
- ?-?: Kazakhstan

Tatyana Dmitriyevna Gubina (Татьяна Дмитриевна Губина, born 15 December 1977) is a Kazakhstani female water polo player. She was a member of the Kazakhstan women's national water polo team, playing as a centre back.

She was a part of the team at the 2000 Summer Olympics and 2004 Summer Olympics. On club level she played for Eurasia Rakhat in Kazakhstan.
