= Svetlana Koroleva (water polo) =

Kazakhstani water polo player

Personal information
- Born: 7 September 1973 (age 51); Zhambyl, Soviet Union

Sport
- Sport: Water polo

Svetlana Viktorovna Korolyova (Russian: Светлана Викторовна Королева; born 7 September 1973) is a water polo player from Kazakhstan, who represented her native country in two consecutive Summer Olympics, starting in 2000. She finished in 6th and 8th place with the Kazakhstani national team.
