= Natalya Ignatyeva =

Kazakhstani water polo player

Personal information
- Full name: Nataliya Yuryevna Ignatyeva
- Nationality: Kazakhstan
- Born: 17 August 1978 (age 48) Alma-Ata, Kazakh SSR, Soviet Union
- Height: 1.68 m (5 ft 6 in)
- Weight: 56 kg (123 lb)

Sport
- Sport: Water polo
- Position: driver

Senior clubs
- Years: Team
- ?-?: Eurasia Rakhat
National team
- Years: Team
- ?-?: Kazakhstan

Nataliya Yuryevna Ignatyeva (Наталья Юрьевна Игнатьева, born 17 August 1978) is a Kazakhstani female water polo player. She was a member of the Kazakhstan women's national water polo team, playing as a driver.

She was a part of the team at the 2000 Summer Olympics and 2004 Summer Olympics. On club level she played for Eurasia Rakhat in Kazakhstan.
