= Marina Mulyayeva =

Kazakhstani swimmer

Personal information
- Full name: Marina Vladimirovna Mulyayeva
- Nickname: Marishka
- National team: Kazakhstan
- Born: 30 April 1981 (age 45) Alma-Ata, Kazakh SSR, Soviet Union
- Height: 1.77 m (5 ft 10 in)
- Weight: 65 kg (143 lb)

Sport
- Sport: Swimming
- Strokes: Freestyle, medley
- College team: University of Maryland (U.S.)

Marina Vladimirovna Mulyayeva (Kazakh: Марина Владимировна Муляева; born April 30, 1981) is a Kazakh former swimmer, who specialized in sprint freestyle and individual medley events. She is a six-time national record holder, a multiple-time ACC titleholder, and a one-time NCAA Honorable Mention All-American swimmer. Mulyayeva is also a varsity swimmer for the Maryland Terrapins and an international business major at the University of Maryland in College Park, Maryland.

Mulyayeva made her first Kazakh team, as a 19-year-old, at the 2000 Summer Olympics in Sydney, where she competed in the women's 200 m individual medley. She edged out Kyrgyzstan's Alexandra Zertsalova on the freestyle leg to lead the first heat in 2:24.09.

At the 2004 Summer Olympics in Athens, Mulyayeva placed twenty-fifth in the 200 m individual medley. Swimming in the same heat from Sydney, she edged out Denmark's Louise Mai Jansen to save a fifth spot by nearly three seconds in 2:24.25.

Mulyayeva decided to drop her specialty event, the 200 m individual medley, and experiment with the 50 m freestyle, when she competed for her third time at the 2008 Summer Olympics in Beijing. She achieved a FINA B-standard of 26.30 from the Kazakhstan Open Championships in Almaty. She challenged seven other swimmers in heat seven, including fellow three-time Olympic veteran Mariya Bugakova of Uzbekistan. She raced to sixth place by three hundredths of a second (0.03) behind Hong Kong's Elaine Chan in 26.57. Mulyayeva failed to advance into the semifinals, as she placed forty-sixth overall out of 92 swimmers in the preliminaries.
