= Yevgeniy Zhilyayev =

Kazakhstani water polo player

Personal information
- Born: 13 July 1973 (age 52) Alma-Ata, Kazakh SSR, Soviet Union
Medal record
Men's water polo
Representing Kazakhstan
Asian Winter Games
Gold medal – first place	1994 Hiroshima	Team
Gold medal – first place	1998 Bangkok	Team
Gold medal – first place	2002 Busan	Team
Gold medal – first place	2010 Guanzhou	Team

Yevgeniy Zhilyayev (born 13 July 1973 in Almaty) is a Kazakhstani water polo player. At the 2012 Summer Olympics, he competed for the Kazakhstan men's national water polo team in the men's event, but he has won no Olympic honor. He is 6 ft 3 in (191 cm) tall.
