= Askar Orazalinov =

Kazakhstani water polo player

Personal information
- Nationality: Kazakhstani
- Born: 13 September 1961 (age 64) Alma-Ata, Kazakh SSR, Soviet Union

Sport
- Sport: Water polo
Medal record
Representing Kazakhstan
Asian Games
Gold medal – first place	1994 Hiroshima	Team competition
Gold medal – first place	1998 Bangkok	Team competition
Gold medal – first place	2002 Busan	Team competition

Askar Orazalinov (born 13 September 1961) is a Kazakhstani water polo player. He competed in the men's tournament at the 2000 Summer Olympics.
