= Kazakhstan men's national water polo team =

Men's national water polo team representing Kazakhstan

Kazakhstan
- FINA code: KAZ
- Association: Swimming Federation of the Republic of Kazakhstan
- Confederation: AASF (Asia)
- Head coach: Rustam Ukumanov
- Asst coach: Damir Temyrkhanov

FINA ranking (since 2008)
- Current: 10 (as of 9 August 2021)
- Highest: 6 (2012)

Olympic Games (team statistics)
- Appearances: 4 (first in 2000)
- Best result: 9th place (2000)

World Championship
- Appearances: 12 (first in 1994)
- Best result: 11th place (1998, 2015, 2017)

World Cup
- Appearances: 1 (first in 2014)
- Best result: 6th place (2014)

World League
- Appearances: 9 (first in 2010)
- Best result: 5th place (2012)

Asian Games
- Appearances: 7 (first in 1994)
- Best result: (gold) (1994, 1998, 2002, 2010, 2014, 2018)

Asian Swimming Championships
- Best result: (silver) (2012, 2016)

Asian Water Polo Championship
- Best result: (gold) (2012)

Asian Cup
- Appearances: 1 (first in 2012)
- Best result: (gold) (2012)

Media
- Website: aquatics.kz
Medal record
Men's water polo
Asian Games
Gold medal – first place	1994 Hiroshima	Team
Gold medal – first place	1998 Bangkok	Team
Gold medal – first place	2002 Busan	Team
Gold medal – first place	2010 Guangzhou	Team
Gold medal – first place	2014 Incheon	Team
Gold medal – first place	2018 Jakarta	Team
Bronze medal – third place	2006 Doha	Team
Asian Swimming Championships
Gold medal – first place	2012 Dubai	Team
Silver medal – second place	2016 Tokyo	Team
Asian Water Polo Championship
Gold medal – first place	2012 Tokyo
Silver medal – second place	2009 Changshu
Bronze medal – third place	2015 Foshan
Asian Cup
Gold medal – first place	2012 Chengdu
- Last updated: 1 May 2020

The Kazakhstan men's national water polo team is the representative for Kazakhstan in international men's water polo.

== Results ==
=== Olympic Games ===
Water polo at the Summer Olympics
Year	Rank	M	W	D	L	GF	GA	GD
1900–1992	Did not enter							
1996	Did not qualify							
2000	9th	8	3	2	3	64	64	0
2004	11th	7	1	0	6	41	59	−18
2008	Did not qualify							
2012	11th	5	0	0	5	24	53	−29
2016	Did not qualify							
2020	11th	5	0	0	5	35	92	−57
2024	Did not qualify							
Total	4/28	25	4	2	19	164	268	−104

=== World Championship ===
Year	Rank	M	W	D	L	GF	GA	GD
1973–1991	Did not enter							
1994	12th	7	2	0	5	63	64	−1
1998	11th	8	2	0	6	52	98	−46
2001	12th	8	2	0	6	43	73	−30
2003–2007	Did not enter							
2009	16th	5	0	0	5	24	62	−38
2011	13th	5	2	0	3	32	64	−32
2013	12th	4	1	0	3	28	41	−13
2015	11th	6	3	0	3	60	52	+8
2017	11th	6	2	0	4	39	63	−24
2019	14th	5	1	0	4	45	67	−22
2022	14th	4	0	0	4	18	65	−47
2023	14th	5	1	0	4	32	74	−42
2024	16th	5	0	0	5	21	114	−93
Total	12/21	68	16	0	52	457	837	−380

=== World Cup ===
FINA Water Polo World Cup
Year	Rank	M	W	D	L	GF	GA	GD
1979–2010	Did not enter							
2014	6th	6	1	0	5	49	76	−27
2018	Did not enter							
2023	R1	4	2	0	2	23	46	−23
Total	2/17	10	3	0	7	72	122	−50

=== World League ===
Year	Rank	M	W	D	L	GF	GA	GD
2002–2009	Did not enter							
2010	R1	10	5	0	5	132	85	+47
2011	R1	8	2	1	5	73	76	−3
2012	5th	12	2	2	8	74	117	−43
2013	Did not enter							
2014	R1	5	1	0	4	38	43	−5
2015	R1	6	2	0	4	66	72	−8
2016	R1	6	2	0	4	56	85	−29
2017	6th	12	2	1	9	86	146	−60
2018	8th	10	1	1	8	63	125	−62
2019	7th	12	3	2	7	107	153	−46
2020	6th	6	0	1	5	58	89	−31
2022	Did not enter							
Total	10/20	87	20	8	59	753	991	−238

=== Asian Games ===
Year	Rank	M	W	D	L	GF	GA	GD
1951–1990	Did not enter							
1994	1/6	5	5	0	0	68	40	+28
1998	1/9	6	6	0	0	74	23	+51
2002	1/6	4	4	0	0	48	22	+26
2006	3/10	5	3	1	1	58	32	+26
2010	1/9	6	6	0	0	100	24	+76
2014	1/7	5	5	0	0	80	30	+50
2018	1/9	6	6	0	0	77	37	+40
Total	7/18	37	35	1	1	505	208	+297

=== Asian Water Polo Championship ===
- 1995 – (gold) Gold medal
- 2000 – (gold) Asian Swimming Championship
- 2005 – (bronze)
- 2009 – (silver) Silver medal
- 2012 – (gold) Gold medal
- 2012 – (silver) Silver medal Asian Swimming Championship
- 2015 – (bronze) Bronze medal
- 2016 – (silver) Silver medal Asian Swimming Championship
- 2022 – (bronze) Bronze medal
- 2023 – (bronze) Bronze medal

=== Asian Cup ===
- 2012 – (gold) Gold medal

=== Islamic Solidarity Games ===
- 2005 – (silver) Silver medal

== Current squad ==
Roster for the 2024 World Aquatics Championships.

Head coach: Rustam Ukumanov

- 1 Temirlan Balfanbayev GK
- 2 Eduard Tsoy FP
- 3 Alexandr Yeremin FP
- 4 Yegor Beloussov FP
- 5 Maxim Lamayev FP
- 6 Vladimir Yurtayev FP
- 7 Anatoliy Pustovalov FP
- 8 Tamir Gribov FP
- 9 Ruslan Akhmetov FP
- 10 Igor Nedokontsev FP
- 11 Kirill Panteleyev FP
- 12 Sultan Shonzhigitov FP
- 13 Akzhan Aday GK
- 14 Nurzhas Nurtaza FP

== See also ==
- Kazakhstan men's Olympic water polo team records and statistics
- Kazakhstan women's national water polo team
