= Russians in Kazakhstan =

Ethnic minority group in Kazakhstan

Russian Kazakhstanis Russian Kazakhs
Total population
- 2,943,022 (14.4% of the population) (2026 government est.)

Regions with significant populations
- Akmola Region, North Kazakhstan, East Kazakhstan, Karaganda Region, Kostanay Region, Pavlodar Region

Languages
- Russian (majority), Kazakh (minority)

Religion
- Russian Orthodox Church

Related ethnic groups
- Ukrainians of Kazakhstan, Uyghurs of Kazakhstan, Germans of Kazakhstan, Tatars of Kazakhstan, Azerbaijanis of Kazakhstan, Koreans of Kazakhstan, Turks of Kazakhstan

There has been a substantial population since the 19th century of Russian Kazakhstanis, or simply Russian Kazakhs, who are ethnic Russians living as citizens in Kazakhstan. Russians formed a plurality of the Kazakh SSR's population for several decades. Although their numbers have been reduced since the breakup of the Soviet Union, they remain prominent in Kazakh society today.

== Early colonisation ==
The first Rusʹ traders and soldiers began to appear on the northwestern edge of modern Kazakhstan territory in the early 16th century, when Cossacks established the forts that later became the cities of Oral (Uralʹsk, est. 1520) and Atyrau (Gurʹyev). Ural, Siberian and later Orenburg Cossack Hosts gradually established themselves in parts of northern Kazakhstan. In 1710s and 1720s Siberian Cossacks founded Oskemen (Ust-Kamennaya), Semey (Semipalatinsk) and Pavlodar (Fort Koryakovskiy) as border forts and trading posts.

Russian imperial authorities followed and were able to seize Kazakh territory because the local khanates were preoccupied by a war with Kalmyks (Oirats, Dzungars). Kazakhs were increasingly caught in the middle between the Kalmyks and the Russians. In 1730 Abul Khayr, one of the khans of the Lesser Horde, sought Russian assistance against the stronger Kalmyks, and the Russians in exchange for help gained permanent control of the Lesser Horde as a result of his decision. The Russians conquered the Middle Horde by 1798, but the Great Horde managed to remain independent until the 1820s, when the expanding Kokand Khanate to the south forced the Great Horde khans to choose Russian protection, which seemed to them the lesser of two evils. In 1824, Siberian Cossacks from Omsk founded a fortress on the upper Ishim River named Akmolinsk, which is known today as Astana, capital of Kazakhstan. In the same year they founded the fort of Kokshetau.

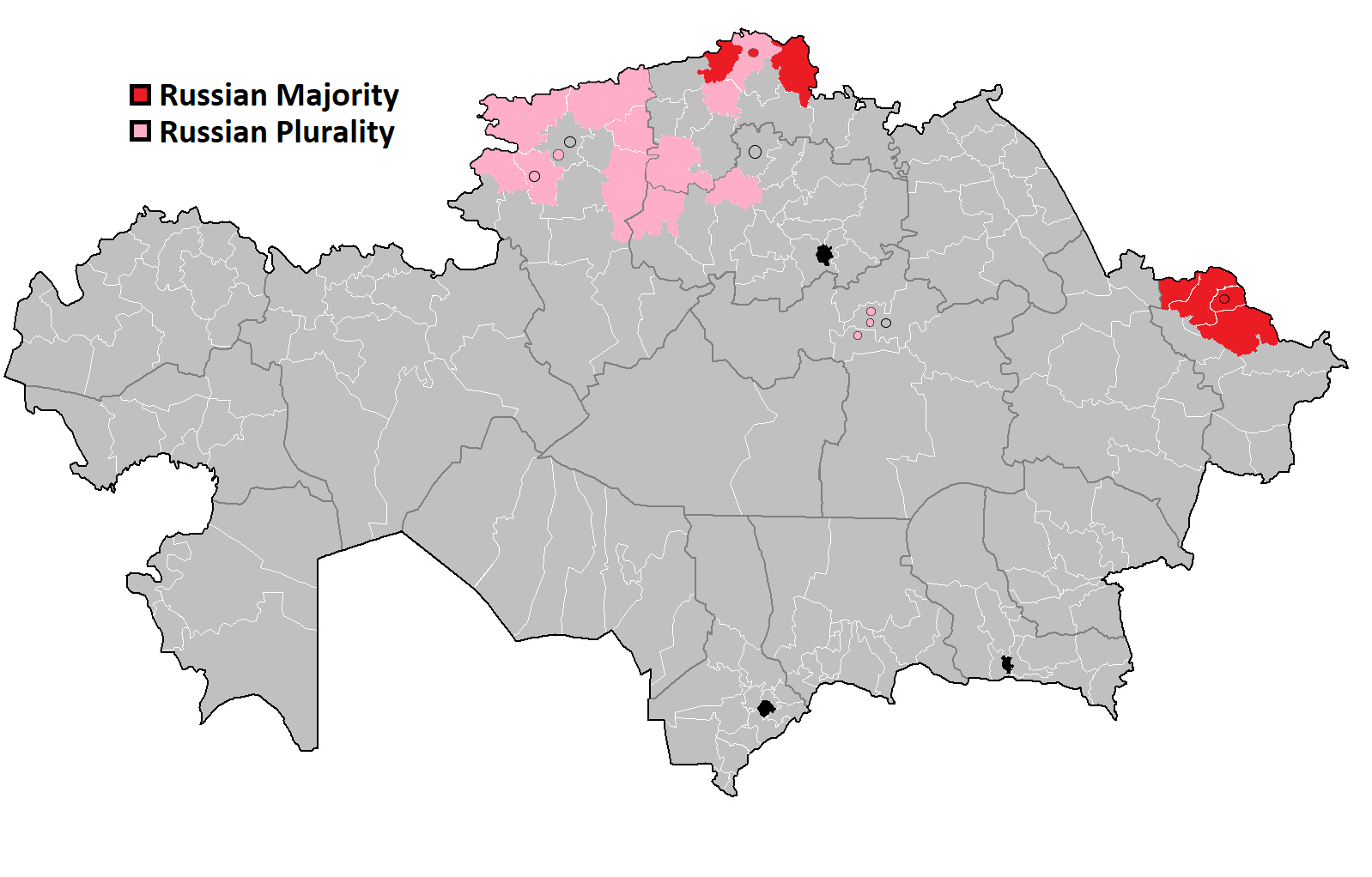
Districts of Kazakhstan in which ethnic Russians are the largest group as of 2024

In the 1850s, the construction of Russian forts began in southern Kazakhstan including Fort Shevchenko (Fort Alexandrovsky), Kyzylorda (Fort Petrovsky), Kazaly (Kazalinsk) and Almaty (Verniy).

In 1863, the Russian Empire created two administrative districts, the Governor-Generalships in Central Asia of Russian Turkestan (the oasis region to the south of the Kazakh steppes and Zhetysu (Semirechye) region) and that of the Steppe (modern eastern and northern Kazakhstan including the lands of the Siberian and Semiryechensk Cossask Hosts) with their capital at Omsk. The north-west of Kazakhstan was at the time part of Orenburg Governorate. First Governor-General Gerasim Kolpakovsky of the Steppe region (and all his future successors) was also ataman of Siberian Cossacks symbolizing the important role the Cossacks played in the Russian colonization of Kazakh territories. In 1869 Russian settlers founded the town of Aktobe (Aktyubinsk), in 1879 Kostanay. In the 1860s General Mikhail Chernyayev conquered the only towns that existed in Kazakhstan before the Russian conquest Hazrat-e Turkestan, Taraz and Shymkent that belonged to the Khanate of Kokand.

Christianity spread in the predominantly Muslim region together with Russian colonists: the Russian Orthodox Church established a Central Asian bishopric in 1871 with its bishop first residing in Verniy and after 1916 in Tashkent.

In the 1890s, many non-Cossack Russian settlers migrated into the fertile lands of northern and eastern Kazakhstan. In 1906 the Trans-Aral Railway between Orenburg and Tashkent was completed, further facilitating Russian and Ukrainian migration to Central Asia.

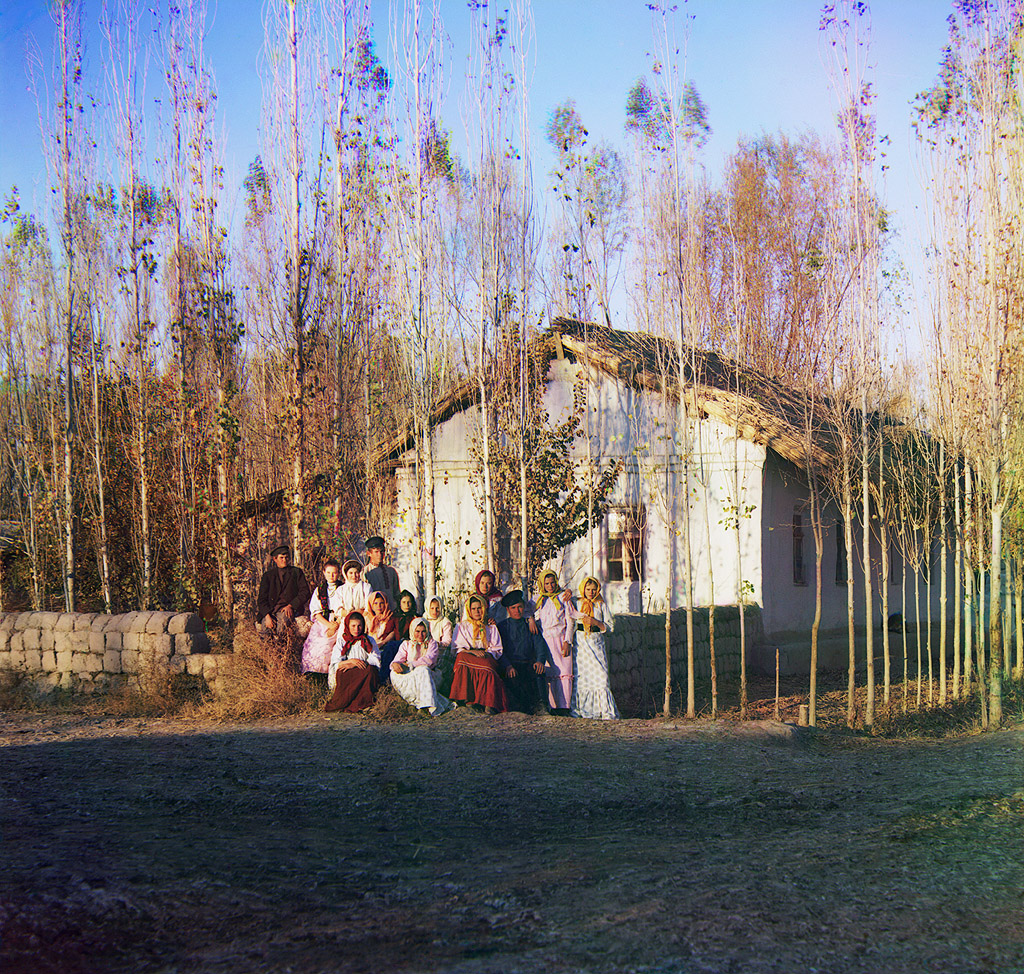
Russian settlers in Kazakhstan, 1911. Sergey Prokudin-Gorsky

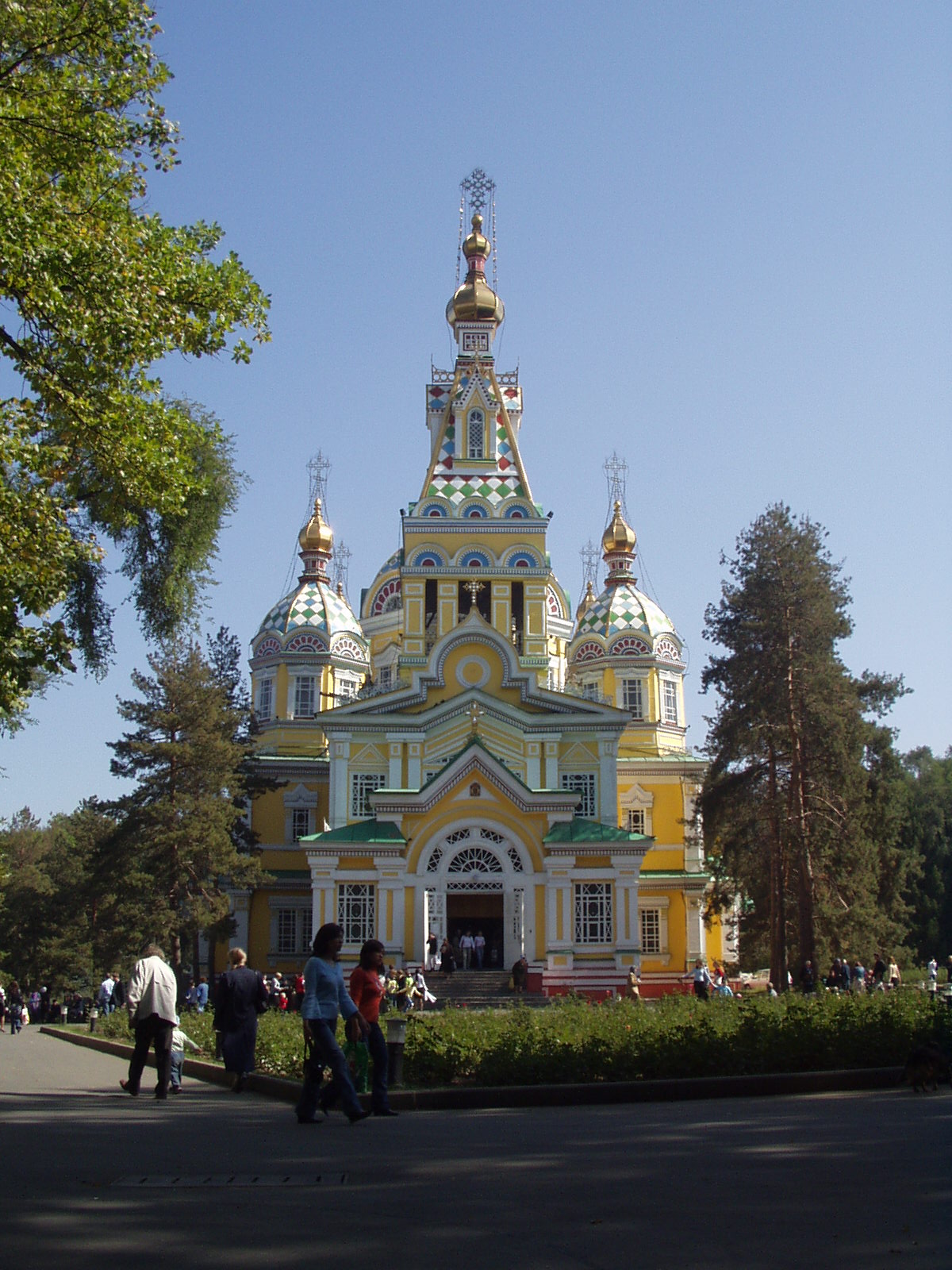
The 19th-century Russian Orthodox church in Almaty is the second-tallest wooden building in the world.

Between 1906 and 1912, more than half a million Ukrainian and Russian farms were started in Kazakhstan as part of the reforms of the Russian minister of the interior Petr Stolypin. By 1917 there were close to a million slavs in Kazakhstan, about 30% of the total population. Analysis of data on migrants who arrived during the Stolypin agrarian reform (1906-1912) on the territory of Kazakhstan shows that 83.1% of the settlers were from Ukraine, the rest came from the southern regions of Russia (16.8%).

== Soviet period ==
Russians of Kazakhstan together with other ethnic groups of the region suffered heavily during the Russian Civil War and Collectivisation in the USSR and endured repeated famines and unrest. In 1918-1931 Basmachi Revolt affected areas of southern Kazakh SSR often taking a form of an ethnic conflict between Russian and Ukrainian farmers and native Muslim nomads. Thousands of Russian settlers are thought to have been killed by the Kazakhs in the violence and this was followed by equally bloody reprisals against the nomadic population by the Red Army.

The Kazakh Autonomous Soviet Socialist Republic was established as part of the RSFSR - the process was not straightforward and included disputes over territories. On 26 August 1920, the Soviet government issued a decree signed by Mikhail Kalinin and Vladimir Lenin "On the formation of the Autonomous Kyrgyz (Kazakh) Soviet Socialist Republic" in the RSFSR. The city of Orenburg, with a majority Russian population, became the capital of the Kazakh Autonomous Republic.

When it came to the formation of borders, there were many opponents to the inclusion of Akmola, Semipalatinsk and Ural regions in the KazASSR. Others, on the contrary, demanded to include the territories of the Omsk region, Barnaul district, Altai region of Russia and some parts of Central Asia into the structure of Kazakhstan. The expediency of the inclusion of Kustanay region into Kazakhstan was comprehensively proved in a note by Akhmet Baitursynov and Mukhamedjan Seralin. It was necessary to prove the necessity of inclusion of Akmola and Semipalatinsk regions. As strangely as it was, these territories, native to Kazakhs, belonged to Western Siberia. Thus, in 1920, the member of the Revcom Alikhan Yermekov in Moscow was at the reception of the leader of the state Vladimir Lenin. In the Kremlin, he made an important report "On the situation of the Kirghiz region in general, and on the issue of borders in particular". Thanks to this document, the Kazakh authorities managed to defend Akmola, Semipalatinsk and Atyrau regions. The republic included a 10-verst long strip along the Urals and Irtysh Rivers, where the Cossacks settled during the expansion of Tsarist Russia.

Many European Soviet citizens and much of Russia's industry were relocated to Kazakhstan during World War II, when Nazi armies threatened to capture all the European industrial centers of the Soviet Union. These migrants founded mining towns which quickly grew to become major industrial centers such as Karaganda (1934), Zhezkazgan (1938), Temirtau (1945) and Ekibastuz (1948). In 1955, the town of Baikonur was built to support the Baikonur Cosmodrome to this day its administered by Russia.

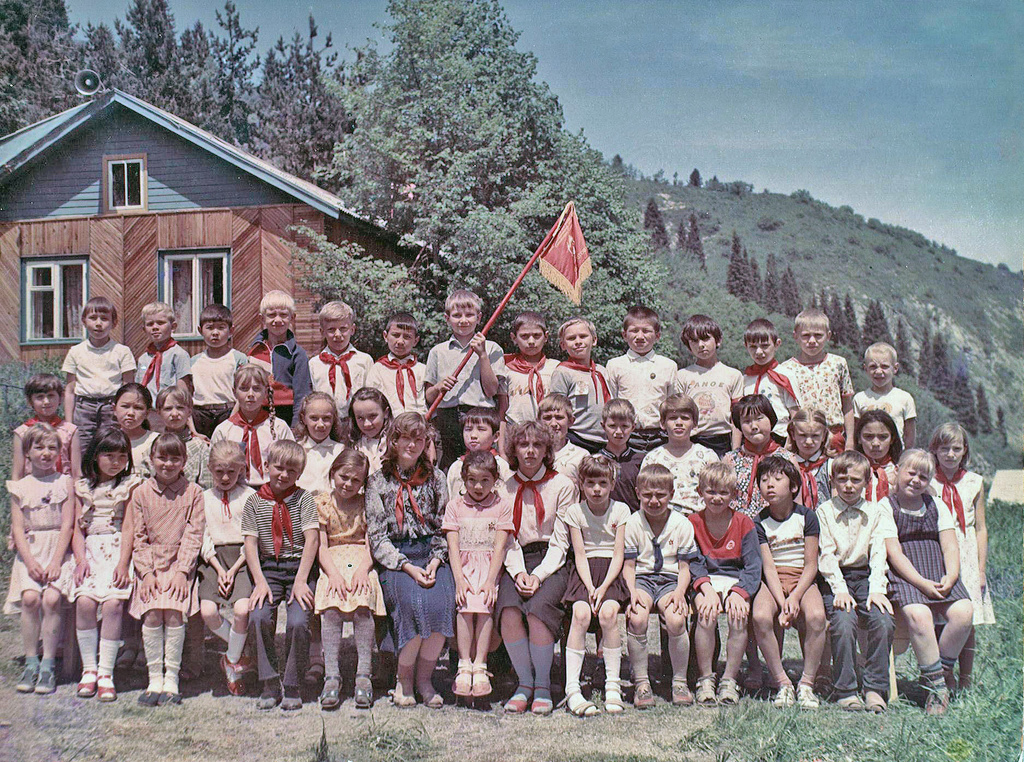
Young Pioneers at a Young Pioneer camp in the Kazakh SSR

Many more Russians arrived in the years 1953–1965, during the so-called Virgin Lands Campaign of Soviet general secretary Nikita Khrushchev. Still more settlers came in the late 1960s and 70s, when the government paid bonuses to workers participating in a program to relocate Soviet industry close to the extensive coal, gas, and oil deposits of Central Asia. By 1979 ethnic Russians in Kazakhstan numbered about 5,991,000, almost 41% of the total population.

In December 1986, Soviet general secretary Mikhail Gorbachev appointed Gennady Kolbin, with no ties to the republic, as the first secretary of the Central Committee of Communist Party of Kazakh SSR, breaking with a tradition of ethnic Kazakh dominance in the local administration. Following several incidents of ethnic unrest in 1989, Kolbin was replaced by Nursultan Nazarbayev who following the dissolution of the Soviet Union became the president of independent Kazakhstan.

According to the 1989 Soviet census, 66% of Russians living in Kazakhstan had been born there, the highest proportion of all Soviet republics besides the Russian SFSR. 37% of the Russians who were born elsewhere had lived in the Kazakh SSR for at least 20 years.

== Post-Soviet period ==
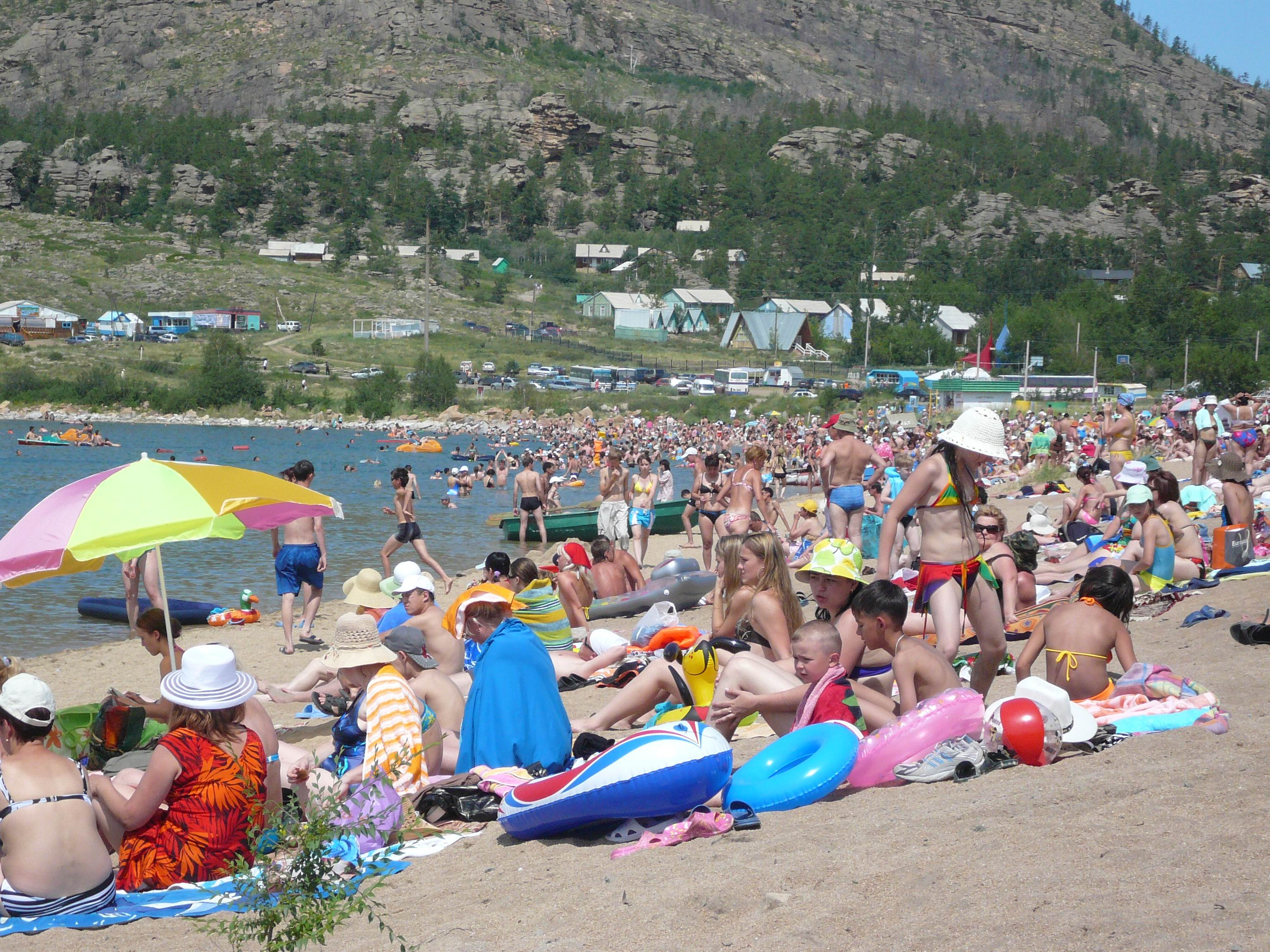
Kazakhstanis on a Lake Jasybay beach, Pavlodar Region

As of 2024, the total population of ethnic Russians in Kazakhstan numbered up to three million people. Although Nazarbayev is widely credited with peaceful preservation of the delicate inter-ethnic balance in Kazakhstan, hundreds of thousands of Russians left Kazakhstan in the 1990s due to the perceived lack of economic opportunities. A number of factors contributed to this situation. Following independence from the Soviet Union, the Kazakh government adopted a policy of developing the state language that sought to affirm the ethnically Kazakh nature of the country and promote Kazakh language and culture. One aspect of this policy was the government's decision to define Kazakhstan as the national state of the ethnically Kazakh people in the country's first constitution in 1993 and again in its second constitution in 1995.

In 1994 Kazakhstan held its first parliamentary elections since independence. In these elections, Kazakh candidates won a disproportionate number of seats compared to Russian candidates relative to the demographic makeup of the country at the time. Observers attributed the over-representation of Kazakh politicians to electoral tampering carried out by the government, primarily through gerrymandering. Many Russians interpreted this as an attempt to promote Kazakh domination of the state at the expense of Russian influence.

A major factor that contributed to the alienation of Russians and the increase of inter-ethnic tensions in post-Soviet Kazakhstan was the government's language policy. Following independence, the government adopted Kazakh as the country's official language. Russian was designated as the language of interethnic communication but not given official status. Over the course of the 1990s, the government mandated the instruction of Kazakh in schools and introduced Kazakh language fluency requirements for all public sector jobs. Many Russians objected to these measures and advocated for official bilingualism, which was denied.

The government's language policy struck many Russians as inequitable, in part because at the time of independence Russian was the de facto language of communication in government and business. Most Kazakhs were already fluent in Russian, while few Russians were fluent in Kazakh. This policy had the effect of excluding the vast majority of Russian-speakers from some of the most coveted professional occupations. These various developments contributed to an increasing sense of marginalization and exclusion among Russians in Kazakhstan. Many Russians felt that there were limited opportunities for them and their children in the country, as a result of the government's new linguistic and educational policies. These and other grievances were major causes of the massive emigration of Russians from Kazakhstan that took place in the 1990s.

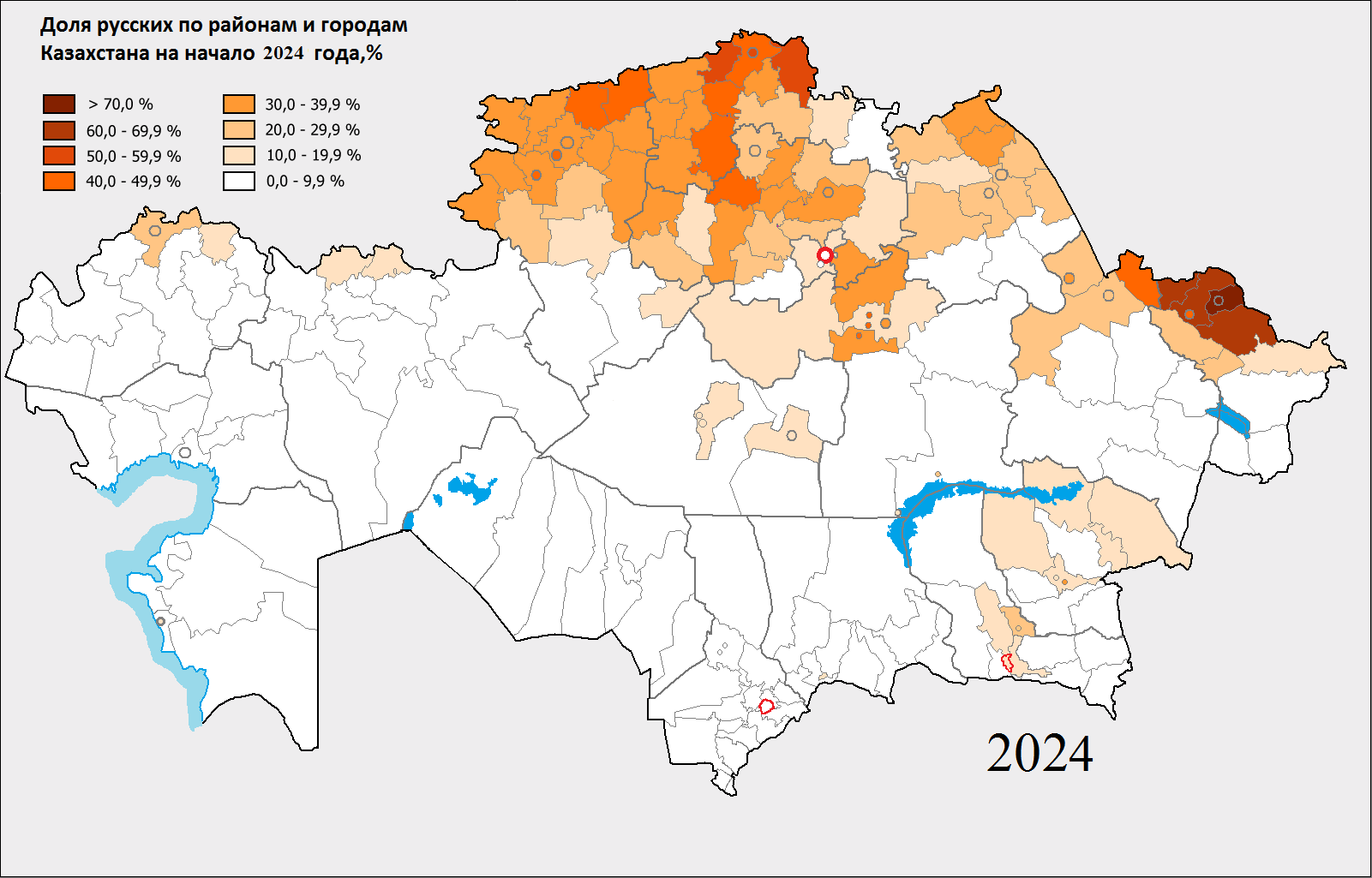
The share Russians by districts and cities of regional and republican subordination Kazakhstan in 2024

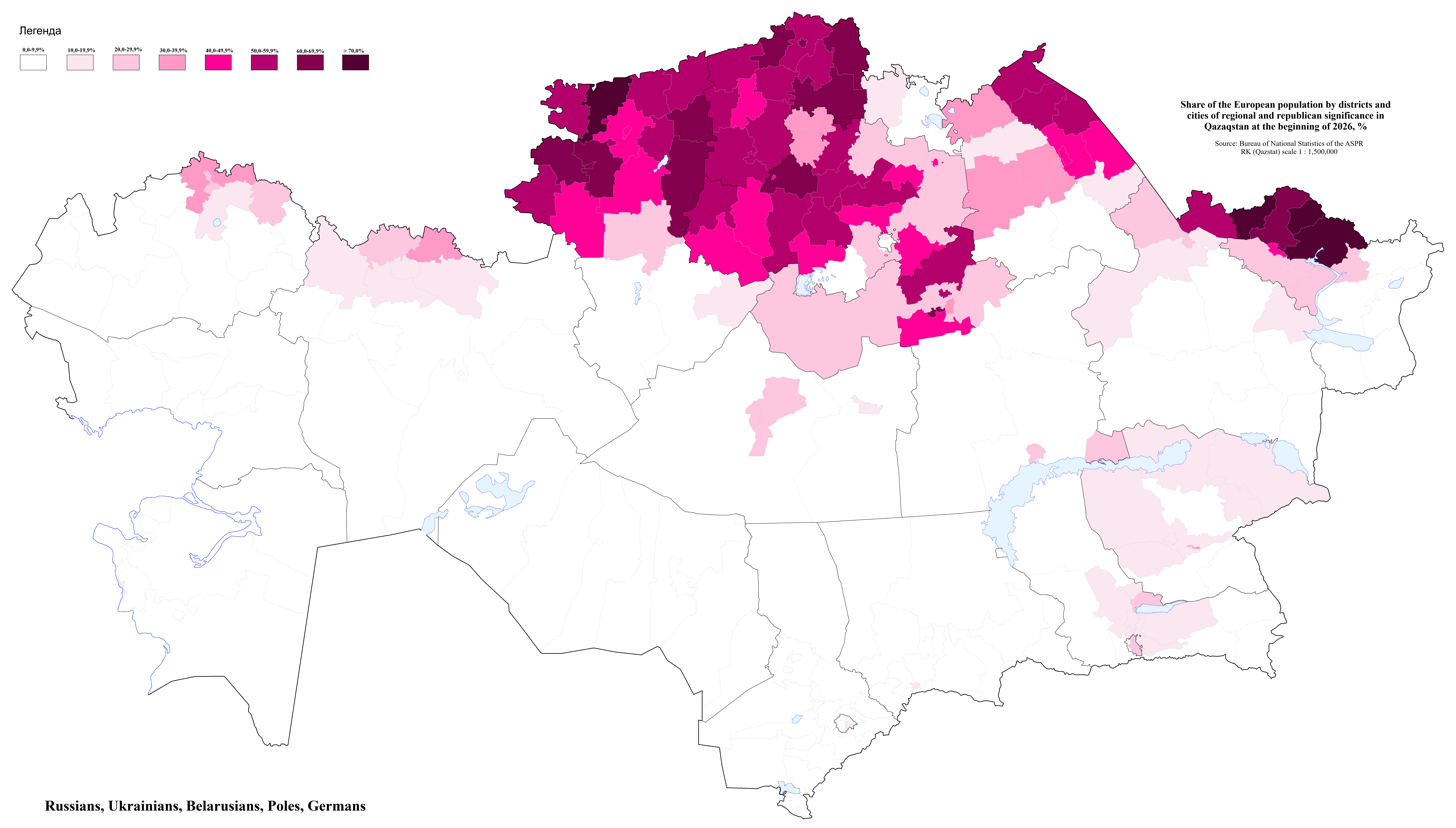
The share of the European population by districts and cities of regional and republican subordination Kazakhstan in 2026 ≥70% 60.0 – 69.9% 50.0 – 59.9% 40.0 – 49.9% 30.0 – 39.9% 20.0 – 29.9% 10.0 – 19.9% 0.0 – 9.9%

By 1999, the number of Russians in Kazakhstan dropped to 4,479,618 people, roughly 30% of Kazakhstan's population. Emigration from Kazakhstan reached its peak in 1994, when 344,112 people emigrated from Kazakhstan to Russia. Since then, it has consistently decreased, perhaps because those most eager to leave or with the resources to leave have already done so. At the beginning of his presidency in 2000, Vladimir Putin met with leaders of the Russian community in Kazakhstan who explained to him the situation they faced in the country. This meeting resulted in a proposal of a massive departure of the remainder of Russians from Kazakhstan. It was suggested that these migrants would revitalize depopulated areas of central Russia and provide a counterweight to the demographic decline of Russians within the Russian Federation.

However, support for the idea has since evaporated and the Russian government has not provided the resources necessary for massive repatriation. The majority of Russians who emigrated from Kazakhstan were Russians born in Russia who had moved to Kazakhstan later in life, primarily for professional reasons. Most of this group resided in urban areas and tended to be more highly educated. In contrast, Russians who were born in the country and whose families have lived in Kazakhstan for two to three generations were far less likely to emigrate. This group is concentrated in rural regions, especially in the northern part of the country. In the 1990s, this group made up two thirds of Kazakhstan's Russian population but only one third of the migrants who left the country. By 2002, the share of Russians in Kazakhstan has dropped to 23.7% of the total population in the country(or 3,793,764 people).

Residents of Almaty of different ethnic backgrounds at the Spirit of Tengri festival, Abai Square

Russians are still an influential socio-political group in Kazakhstan, and they remain active in Kazakhstan's public, military, cultural and economic life. Although the Kazakh language is the state language, Russian is now also officially used as an equal language to Kazakh in Kazakhstan's public institutions. Kazakhstan is also part of the Eurasian Economic Union with Russia.

After the Russian invasion of Ukraine, tens and hundreds of thousands of Russian immigrants intending to avoid the 2022 Russian mobilization fled to Kazakhstan due to a relatively open border and few restrictions on travel. Whilst up to 930,000 Russians initially moved to Kazakhstan following mobilization, the majority of these have since moved on to third countries or returned to Russia, with only approximately 50,000 - 80,000 remaining in Kazakhstan by the end of 2023.

== Number and share ==
Today, the most updated number of ethnic Russian Kazakh citizens from a reliable source numbered up to 3,500,000 people, or 17.5% of the total population of Kazakhstan, which was recorded in 2022.

=== Censuses ===
Number and share of Russians according to the census over the years by regions:

	Number							Share (in %)					
	1970	1979	1989	1999	2009	2021		1970	1979	1989	1999	2009	2021
Kazakhstan	5 521 917	5 991 205	6 062 019	4 479 620	3 793 764	2 981 946	Kazakhstan	42.43	40.78	37.42	29.95	23.69	15.54
Akmola Region	424 421	442 506	459 348	329 454	264 011	210 769	Akmola Region	44.22	44.47	43.15	39.39	35.79	26.92
Aktobe Region	145 218	158 298	173 281	114 416	103 069	67 462	Aktobe Region	26.37	25.11	23.65	16.76	13.60	7.44
Almaty	530 931	612 783	615 365	510 366	452 947	415 705	Almaty	68.28	64.04	57.40	45.19	33.16	20.48
Almaty Region	481 944	514 011	518 315	339 984	306 383	229 234	Almaty Region	37.87	35.36	31.54	21.81	16.94	10.68
Atyrau Region	76 316	67 957	63 673	38 013	33 617	30 059	Atyrau Region	22.42	18.18	14.99	8.63	6.58	4.46
East Kazakhstan Region	881 608	899 047	914 424	694 705	561 183	430 978	East Kazakhstan Region	56.37	54.24	50.87	45.37	40.18	32.13
Jambyl Region	256 267	282 403	275 424	179 258	122 612	87 965	Jambyl Region	32.34	30.36	26.51	18.12	11.99	7.33
Karaganda Region	788 777	859 363	817 900	614 416	529 961	391 718	Karaganda Region	50.54	50.16	46.85	43.56	39.49	29.05
Kostanay Region	432 109	483 260	535 100	430 242	380 599	280 577	Kostanay Region	42.93	44.37	43.72	42.27	42.97	33.66
Kyzylorda Region	91 797	86 084	37 960	17 155	16 146	12 324	Kyzylorda Region	18.56	15.31	6.60	2.87	2.37	1.51
Mangystau Region	60 008	99 923	106 801	46 630	39 851	31 990	Mangystau Region	37.68	40.15	32.93	14.81	8.21	4.35
North Kazakhstan Region	458 783	463 114	469 636	361 461	300 849	240 567	North Kazakhstan Region	52.43	52.36	51.49	49.78	50.43	44.48
Astana	104 010	133 432	152 147	129 480	122 215	118 376	Astana	57.36	67.93	54.09	40.54	19.93	9.59
Pavlodar Region	310 004	370 916	427 658	337 924	287 970	223 712	Pavlodar Region	44.41	45.94	45.38	41.87	38.78	29.56
Turkistan Region	282 553	300 365	278 473	162 098	136 538	27 926	Turkistan Region	21.91	19.14	15.27	8.19	5.52	1.36
West Kazakhstan Region	197 171	217 743	216 514	174 018	135 813	109 205	West Kazakhstan Region	38.42	37.18	34.39	28.21	22.60	16.16
Shymkent						73 379	Shymkent						6.6

== Prominent ethnic Russians from Kazakhstan ==
- Nik Antropov
- Viktor Khrapunov
- Yuri Ilyin
- Pavel Kazantsev
- Dmitriy Balandin
- Anatoli Boukreev
- Alexander Dutov
- Gennady Golovkin (half-Korean)
- Vassiliy Jirov
- Ilya Ilyin
- Natalya Ilyina
- Vsevolod Ivanov
- Andrey Kashechkin
- Roman Kireyev
- Andrei Kivilev
- Nikolay Koksharov
- Ruslana Korshunova
- Yuri Lonchakov
- Vladimir Muravyov
- Viktor Patsayev
- Elena Rybakina
- Olga Rypakova
- Vitaliy Savin
- Irina Saratovtseva
- Mikhail Shaidorov
- Fedor Shcherbakov
- Olga Shishigina
- Denis Shemelin
- Vladimir Smirnov
- Igor Sysoev
- Ivan Strebkov (basketball)
- Dmitriy Gavrilov
- Alexander Vinokourov
- Alexandre Vinokurov
- Nicolas Vinokurov
- Alexander Volkov
- Oleg Yankovsky
- Pavel Akolzin
- Roman Aleksandrov
- Sergei Alexandrov (ice hockey)
- Viktor Alexandrov
- Sergei Antipov
- Alexei Antsiferov
- Artyom Argokov
- Alikhan Asetov
- Vladimir Belyayev (ice hockey)
- Maksim Belyayev (ice hockey)
- Sergey Belyayev
- Aleksey Belyayev
- Galina Belyayeva (sport shooter)
- Evgeni Blokhin
- Anatoly Bogdanov (footballer)
- Evgeni Bolyakin
- Alexei Bondarev
- Mikhail Borodulin
- Nikita Boyarkin
- Evgeni Bumagin
- Alexander Byzov
- Pyotr Devyatkin
- Dmitri Dudarev
- Yevgeny Fadeyev
- Anatoli Filatov
- Andrei Gavrilin
- Vladimir Grebenshchikov
- Dmitri Gurkov
- Lyubov Ibragimova
- Alexei Ivanov (ice hockey, born 1988)
- Nikita Ivanov (ice hockey)
- Pavel Kamentsev
- Anton Kazantsev
- Alexey Kolessov
- Tatyana Khlyzova
- Maxim Khudyakov
- Vitaliy Khudyakov
- Alexei Koledayev
- Anton Kuzmin
- Stanislav Kuzmin
- Yevgeniya Kuzmina
- Vladislav Kolesnikov
- Maxim Komissarov
- Olga Konysheva
- Andrei Korabeinikov
- Semyon Koshelev
- Dimitrij Kotschnew
- Vadim Krasnoslobodtsev
- Oleg Kryazhev
- Olga Kryukova
- Ivan Kuchin
- Aleksey Igorevich Kuznetsov
- Igor Kuznetsov (ice hockey)
- Artyom Likhotnikov
- Alexander Lipin
- Ilya Lobanov
- Nadezhda Loseva
- Alexei Maklyukov
- Maxim Kuznetsov
- Dmitri Malgin
- Mikhail Malakhov (jurist)
- Svetlana Maltseva
- Yekaterina Maltseva
- Anatoli Melikhov
- Leonid Metalnikov
- Valentin Milyukov
- Nikita Mokin
- Igor Nikitin (ice hockey)
- Vitali Novopashin
- Sergei Ogureshnikov
- Valeri Orekhov
- Evgeni Paladiev
- Mikhail Panshin
- Kirill Panyukov
- Andrei Pchelyakov
- Georgi Petrov (ice hockey)
- Yegor Petukhov
- Pavel Poluektov
- Kirill Polokhov
- Olga Potapova
- Yevgeni Pupkov
- Konstantin Romanov (ice hockey)
- Evgeni Rymarev
- Andrei Samokhvalov
- Andrei Savenkov
- Viktoriya Sazonova
- Maxim Semyonov
- Yegor Shalapov
- Andrei Shayanov
- Arkadiy Shestakov
- Alexander Shimin
- Andrei Shutov (ice hockey)
- Andrei Sokolov (ice hockey)
- Ilya Solaryov
- Yuliya Solovyova
- Andrei Spiridonov
- Vyacheslav Tokarev
- Vitali Tregubov
- Natalya Trunova
- Vyacheslav Tryasunov
- Valeri Tushentsov
- Svetlana Vasina
- Maxim Volkov
- Mariya Agapova
- Alexei Vorontsov
- Oleg Yeremeyev
- Vladimir Zavyalov (ice hockey)
- Kirill Zinovyev
- Valery Anisimov
- Viktor Antipin
- Vladimir Antipin
- Vladimir Bakulin
- Igor Valetov
- Ilya Mokretsov
- Eduard Vinokurov
- Vyacheslav Grigoryev
- Konstantin Lokhanov
- Roman Melyoshin
- Andrey Samokhin
- Leonid Spiridonov
- Dmitriy Alexanin
- Oleg Sakirkin
- Oleg Boltin
- Sergey Baburin
- Yevgeniy Alexeyev (canoeist)
- Elena Antonova (skier)
- Sergey Arzamasov
- Dmitriy Barmashov
- Sergey Morozov (fighter)
- Sofya Berultseva
- Valeriy Borisov
- Vladimir Borisov
- Roman Chentsov
- Sergey Cherepanov
- Konstantin Chernov
- Ilya Chernyshov
- Alexandr Chervyakov
- Alexey Dergunov
- Valeriy Dmitriyev
- Igor Dorokhin
- Svetlana Deshevykh
- Sergey Drozdov
- Margarita Dulova
- Alexandr Dymovskikh
- Yevgeniy Fedorov
- Dmitry Fofonov
- Daniil Fominykh
- Lyudmila Fedotova
- Artur Fedosseyev
- Stanislav Filimonov
- Sergey Filimonov
- Lyubov Filimonova
- Artur Fyodorov
- Aleksandr Fyodorov (water polo)
- Alexandr Gaidukov (water polo)
- Yuliya Galysheva
- Vadim Galeyev
- Ilya Golendov
- Maxim Gourov
- Dmitriy Gruzdev
- Sergey Gubarev
- Andrey Gurov
- Natalya Gurova
- Dmitriy Karpov
- Irina Karpova
- Alexey Khovrin
- Elena Khrustaleva
- Darya Klimina
- Inna Klinova
- Svetlana Klyuchnikova
- Elena Kolomina
- Andrey Kondryshev
- Sergey Kopytov
- Sergey Korepanov (race walker)
- Alexander Koreshkov (ice hockey)
- Yevgeni Koreshkov
- Dmitriy Koshkin
- Yevgeniy Koshkin
- Mikhail Kukushkin
- Denis Kuzin
- Marina Lebedeva
- Yevgeniy Levkin
- Pavel Lipilin
- Andrey Makarov (weightlifter)
- Nikolay Maksimov
- Svetlana Malahova-Shishkina
- Yevgeniy Medvedev
- Yuriy Melsitov
- Andrey Mizurov
- Dimitry Muravyev
- Inna Mozhevitina
- Margarita Mukasheva
- Svetlana Lukasheva
- Yekaterina Larionova
- Aleksandr Nedovyesov
- Konstantin Negodyayev
- Andrey Nevzorov
- Yekaterina Smirnova (canoeist)
- Olga Smirnova (wrestler)
- Olga Novikova (orienteer)
- Maxim Odnodvortsev
- Dmitriy Pantov
- Alexander Parygin
- Svetlana Podobedova
- Irina Podoinikova
- Alexey Poltoranin
- Olga Poltoranina
- Alexandr Polukhin
- Vladislav Polyakov
- Dmitriy Pozdnyakov
- Aleksandr Akunichikov
- Lyudmila Prokasheva
- Yevgeniy Prokhin
- Pavel Ryabinin
- Margarita Torlopova
- Valeriya Tyuleneva
- Svetlana Ussova
- Olga Safronova
- Milana Safronova
- Olga Seleznyova
- Sergey Sergeyev (canoeist)
- Natalya Sergeyeva
- Sergey Sergin
- Konstantin Shafranov
- Nadezhda Stepashkina
- Artemiy Sevostyanov
- Sergey Shabalin
- Yelena Shalygina
- Lyudmila Shumilova
- Alexandr Shvedov
- Yevgeni Safonov (skier)
- Mark Starostin
- Anastassiya Slonova
- Mikhail Sorokin
- Darya Starostina
- Elizaveta Stekolnikova
- Igor Zubrilin
- Yevgeniy Zhilyayev
- Ivan Zaitsev (water polo)
- Andrey Yerguchyov
- Sergey Yemelyanov (canoeist)
- Mikhail Yemelyanov
- Alexandr Yemelyanov
- Timofey Yemelyanov
- Margarita Yelisseyeva
- Vitali Yeremeyev
- Yevgeniy Yegorov
- Grigoriy Yegorov
- Alexey Yegorov
- Sergey Yakshin
- Vladimir Vokhmyanin
- Vladimir Ushakov
- Dmitriy Tyurin
- Dmitriy Torlopov
- Olga Tereshkova
- Vitaliy Abramov
- Sergei Anashkin
- Igor Avdeyev
- Aleksandr Bogatyryov
- Andrei Bogomolov
- Dmitry Byakov
- Vladislav Chernyshov
- Anton Chichulin
- Vadim Egoshkin
- Willi Evseev
- Aleksandr Familtsev
- Maksim Fedin
- Ilya Fomichev
- Mikhail Gabyshev
- Matvey Gerasimov
- Sergey Gridin
- Andrey Gridin
- Valeriy Ivanov (biathlete)
- Yury Ivanov (footballer, born 1972)
- Vitaly Kafanov
- Oleg Kapustnikov
- Nikita Khokhlov (footballer, born 1983)
- Aleksandr Kirov
- Aleksandr Kislitsyn
- Yevgeni Klimov
- Alexei Klishin
- Stanislav Kankurov
- Valery Korobkin
- Viktor Kovalev
- Sergei Kozyulin
- Andrey Kucheryavykh
- Anton Kuksin
- Andrei Kurdyumov
- Sergey Kvochkin
- Sergei Larin
- Konstantin Ledovskikh
- Vladimir Loginov (footballer)
- Oleg Lotov
- Yevgeny Lovchev (footballer)
- Stanislav Lunin
- Yevgeniy Lunyov
- Dmitry Lyapkin
- Denis Malinin
- Gleb Maltsev
- Dmitry Mamonov
- Aleksandr Marochkin
- Aleksandr Mokin
- Andrey Morev
- Oleg Musin
- Igor Atanov
- Sergey Barabashin
- Dmitry Nazarov (footballer)
- Dmytro Nepohodov
- Maksim Nizovtsev
- Yuri Novikov
- Yevgeni Ovshinov
- Aleksandr Petukhov (footballer, born 1985)
- Vladimir Plotnikov (footballer)
- Stas Pokatilov
- Aleksei Popov (footballer, born 1978)
- Yevgeny Postnikov
- Aleksey Rodionov
- Denis Rodionov
- Mikhail Rozhkov
- Maksim Samorodov
- Grigory Sartakov
- Aleksandr Shatskikh
- Denis Shchetkin
- Aleksey Shchyotkin
- Andrey Shkurin
- Artur Shushenachev
- Vyacheslav Shvyryov
- Andrei Sidelnikov
- Ivan Sivozhelezov
- Aleksandr Sklyarov
- Sergei Skorykh
- Lev Skvortsov
- Oleg Sobirov
- Vyacheslav Sobolev
- Andrej Startsev
- Ivan Sviridov
- Yevgeni Tarasov
- Sergey Timofeev
- Andrey Travin
- Anton Tsirin
- Roman Uzdenov
- Vladislav Vasilyev (footballer, born 1997)
- Sergei Volgin
- Denis Volodin
- Ilya Vorotnikov (footballer, born 1986)
- Oleg Voskoboynikov
- Valeriy Yablochkin
- Vitali Yevstigneyev
- Pavel Yevteyev
- Igor Yurin
- Eva Dedova
- Georgy Zhukov (footballer)
- Aleksandr Zuyev (footballer)
- Viktor Zubarev (footballer)
- Svetlana Bortnikova
- Alexandra Burova
- Natalia Ivanova (footballer)
- Yekaterina Krasyukova
- Yulia Myasnikova
- Angelina Portnova
- Irina Sandalova
- Svetlana Stupina
- Anastassiya Vlassova
- Mariya Yalova
- Mariya Grigorova
- Yuliya Krygina
- Olga Vediasheva
- Danil Anisimov
- Andrey Kolotvin
- Igor Zakurdayev
- Anastassiya Bannova
- Viktoriya Beloslyudtseva
- Irina Leonova (archer)
- Olga Pilipova
- Artyom Gankin
- Denis Gankin
- Sergey Martynov (archer)
- Vladimir Yesheyev
- Svetlana Kazanina
- Lyudmila Butuzova
- Yelizaveta Matveyeva
- Anna Ustinova
- Yekaterina Yevseyeva
- Tatyana Azarova
- Svetlana Gusarova
- Margarita Ponomaryova
- Aleksandra Romanova
- Anastasiya Soprunova
- Anastassiya Vinogradova
- Tatyana Bocharova
- Yelena Koshcheyeva
- Anastassya Kudinova
- Yelena Pershina
- Anna Tarasova
- Zoya Ivanova
- Irina Smolnikova
- Yevgeniy Ektov
- Irina Ektova
- Yekaterina Ektova
- Mariya Ovchinnikova
- Kristina Ovchinnikova
- Yelena Parfyonova
- Anna Tarasova
- Tatyana Roslanova
- Viktoriya Yalovtseva
- Yelena Kuznetsova
- Polina Repina
- Regina Rykova
- Maya Sazonova
- Svetlana Tolstaya
- Galina Yakusheva
- Viktoriya Kovyreva
- Nataliya Vorobyova (sprinter)
- Elina Mikhina
- Viktoriya Zyabkina
- Yuriy Pakhlyayev
- Vitaliy Tsykunov
- Dmitriy Koblov
- Viktor Leptikov
- Viktor Yevsyukov
- Yevgeniy Labutov
- Konstantin Safronov
- Anatoly Badrankov
- Alexey Gussarov
- Artem Kossinov
- Mihail Krassilov
- Boris Kuznetsov (athlete)
- Andrey Leymenov
- Mikhail Kolganov (runner)
- Nikita Filippov (pole vaulter)
- Sergey Grigoryev (pole vaulter)
- Vitaliy Anichkin
- Valeriy Borisov
- Sergey Korepanov (race walker)
- Ivan Ivanov (shot putter)
- Sergey Rubtsov
- Nikolay Kolesnikov (sprinter)
- Aleksandr Kurochkin
- Vitaliy Medvedev (sprinter)
- Vyacheslav Muravyev
- Vladimir Muravyov (athlete)
- Vitaliy Savin
- Vladimir Sukharev
- Sergey Zaikov
- Alexandr Mukhin
- Mariya Telushkina
- Elizaveta Axenova
- Yevgeniy Pavlov
- Valery Rachkov
- Natalya Bogdanova
- Viktoriya Grafeyeva
- Valentina Khalzova
- Marina Volnova
- Yevgeniya Bogunova
- Dayana Fedossova
- Varvara Massyagina
- Alexandra Podryadova
- Tatyana Shishkina
- Ivan Baglayev
- Igor Peshkov
- Maxim Rakov
- Alexandr Kulikov (canoeist)
- Grigory Medvedev
- Konstantin Negodyayev
- Alexandra Opachanova
- Vladimir Belonogov
- Vladislav Yakovlev (rower)
- Svetlana Khokhlova
- Maxim Lifontov
- Konstantin Rachkov
- Margarita Dulova
- Lyudmila Guryeva
- Elena Khrustaleva
- Anna Kistanova
- Darya Klimina
- Anna Lebedeva
- Marina Lebedeva
- Inna Mozhevitina
- Olga Poltoranina
- Alina Raikova
- Anton Pantov
- Dmitriy Pantov
- Vassiliy Podkorytov
- Dmitriy Pozdnyakov
- Alexandr Trifonov
- Roman Yeremin
- Vladimir Bortsov
- Nikolay Ivanov (skier)
- Alexandr Kolyadin
- Andrey Kondryshev
- Pavel Korolyov
- Denis Krivushkin
- Roman Ragozin
- Pavel Ryabinin
- Zinaida Amosova
- Irina Bykova
- Yelena Chernetsova
- Oksana Kotova
- Marina Matrossova
- Tatyana Osipova
- Yelena Antonova (cyclist)
- Nadezhda Geneleva
- Tatyana Geneleva
- Marina Kurnossova
- Stepan Astafyev
- Dmitry Lukyanov (cyclist)
- Daniil Marukhin
- Yuriy Natarov
- Matvey Nikitin
- Viktor Okishev
- Sergey Ponomaryov
- Yevgeniy Sladkov
- Youri Sourkov
- Nikita Stalnov
- Roman Vassilenkov
- Sergei Yakovlev (cyclist)
- Artyom Zakharov
- Oleg Zemlyakov
- Yuriy Kozhanov
- Anton Ponomarev
- Mikhail Chopov
- Anatoliy Kolesnikov
- Alexey Kuleshov (beach volleyball)
- Tatyana Mashkova
- Dmitriy Yakovlev
- Aleksandr Dryagin
- Natalya Chikina
- Yelena Ivanova (diver)
- Olga Khristoforova
- Natalya Popova (diver)
- Irina Vyguzova
- Marina Khalturina
- Andrei Krukov
- Dmitri Lagutin
- Juri Litvinov
- Sofia Samodelkina
- Vladimir Cheburin
- Igor Yulchiyev
- Aleksandr Goncharov
- Artyom Kuchin
- Irina Yevdokimova
- Stepan Gorbachev
- Valeri Liukin
- Nastia Liukin
- Valeri Liukin
- Vladimir Novikov (gymnast)
- Anna Kotchneva
- Milana Parfilova
- Irina Alexandrova
- Irina Antonova (handballer)
- Irina Danilova
- Tatyana Davydova
- Tatiana Erokhina
- Yelena Ilyukhina
- Kristina Radayeva
- Valeriya Karavayeva
- Veronika Khardina
- Natalya Kubrina
- Yevgeniya Latkina
- Natalya Yakovleva (handballer)
- Xeniya Volnukhina
- Yana Vassilyeva
- Olga Tankina
- Olga Travnikova
- Yevgeniya Tsupenkova
- Yekaterina Tyapkova
- Igor Sitnikov
- Mariya Sitnikova
- Valentina Sitnikova
- Yelena Suyazova
- Anastassiya Rodina
- Tatyana Parfenova
- Marina Pikalova
- Iulia Poilova
- Yelena Portova
- Mariya Pupchenkova
- Kristina Nedopekina
- Kseniya Nikandrova
- Anna Nikitina
- Alexey Nemtsev
- Aleksandr Asanov
- Igor Pirekeyev
- Yury Rodnov
- Yuriy Yurkov
- Dmitriy Chvykov
- Ivan Karaulov
- Aleksandr Kolmakov
- Aleksandr Korobov
- Ilya Mizernykh
- Alexey Pchelintsev
- Maxim Polunin
- Andrey Verveykin
- Irina Kormysheva
- Yuliya Rodionova
- Darya Rybalova
- Aleksey Bannikov
- Pavel Kolmakov
- Yekaterina Aydova
- Anzhelika Gavrilova
- Elizaveta Golubeva
- Andrey Golubev
- Igor Gramotkin
- Nadezhda Morozova (speed skater)
- Marina Pupina
- Natalya Rybakova
- Anastassiya Krestova
- Inna Simonova
- Yelena Sinitsina
- Stanislav Palkin
- Yevgeny Sanarov
- Vadim Sayutin
- Sergey Kaznacheyev
- Vladimir Klepinin
- Vladimir Kostin (speed skater)
- Artyom Krikunov
- Fyodor Mezentsev
- Viktor Shasherin
- Nikolay Ulyanin
- Viktor Varlamov
- Aleksandr Zhigin
- Marina Sedneva
- Yevgeniya Yermakova
- Marina Mulyayeva
- Diana Nazarova
- Yuliya Litvina
- Nataliya Galkina
- Yekaterina Glushkova
- Tatyana Gubina
- Natalya Ignatyeva
- Evgeny Korolev
- Alexey Korolev
- Svetlana Koroleva (water polo)
- Anna Zubkova
- Irina Tolkunova
- Natalia Shepelina
- Galina Rytova
- Yuliya Pyryseva
- Tatyana Ponomaryova
- Oxana Makeyeva
- Larisa Olkhina
- Andrey Gavrilov
- Konstantin Petrov
- Viktor Aboimov
- Andrey Kvassov
- Oleg Shteynikov
- Pavel Sidorov
- Sergey Ushkalov
- Alexander Varakin
- Alexandr Tarabrin
- Vadim Alekseyev
- Yevgeniy Ryzhkov
- Grigoriy Matuzkov
- Yuri Kudinov
- Denis Zhivchikov
- Stanislav Shvedov
- Anna Kulkina
- Anastassiya Lavrova
- Marina Shumakova
- Irina Selyutina
- Yaroslava Shvedova
- Galina Voskoboeva
- Yulia Putintseva
- Yuri Schukin
- Timofey Skatov
- Denis Yevseyev
- Grigoriy Lomakin
- Arina Shulgina
- Mikhail Kuznetsov (triathlete)
- Danylo Sapunov
- Oļegs Antropovs
- Roman Fartov
- Vladimir Prokofyev
- Alexandr Stolnikov
- Vitaliy Vorivodin
- Sergey Kuznetsov (volleyball)
- Anton Kuznetsov
- Alexandra Aborneva
- Karina Goricheva
- Tatyana Kapustina
- Tatyana Khromova
- Tatyana Koshevnikova
- Nadezda Likhacheva
- Alla Vazhenina
- Irina Nekrassova
- Alexey Churkin
- Sergey Istomin
- Vladimir Kuznetsov (weightlifter, born 1984)
- Alexandr Zaichikov
- Eduard Tyukin
- Denis Ulanov
- Vladimir Sedov
- Kirill Pavlov (weightlifter)
- Marina Aitova
- Vadim Tarasov
- Aleksandr Sudin

== See also ==
- Kazakhstan–Russia relations
- Demographics of Kazakhstan
- Ethnic Russians in post-Soviet states
- Ukrainians in Kazakhstan
- Kazakhs in Russia
