= Alpine skiing at the 1999 Asian Winter Games =

- Venue: Yongpyong Resort
- Dates: 31 January – 5 February 1999
- Competitors: 45 from 12 nations

Alpine skiing at the 1999 Winter Asian Games took place in the resort town of Yongpyong, Gangwon, South Korea with six events contested — three each for men and women. Slalom events were reinstated in this edition of the games after being substituted for Super Giant slalom events in the 1996 Winter Asiad in Harbin, China.

== Schedule ==
F	Final

Event↓/Date →	31st Sun	1st Mon	2nd Tue	3rd Wed	4th Thu	5th Fri
Men's slalom					F	
Men's giant slalom			F			
Men's super-G	F					
Women's slalom						F
Women's giant slalom				F		
Women's super-G		F				

== Medalists ==
=== Men ===
Event	Gold	Silver	Bronze
Slalom	Hur Seung-wook; South Korea	Joji Kawaguchi; Japan	Choi Moon-sung; South Korea
Giant slalom	Joji Kawaguchi; Japan	Hur Seung-wook; South Korea	Lee Ki-hyun; South Korea
Super-G	Hur Seung-wook; South Korea	Joji Kawaguchi; Japan	Choi Moon-sung; South Korea

=== Women ===
Event	Gold	Silver	Bronze
Slalom	Rina Seki; Japan	Olga Vediasheva; Kazakhstan	Yoo Hye-min; South Korea
Giant slalom	Olga Vediasheva; Kazakhstan	Yoo Hye-min; South Korea	Yuliya Krygina; Kazakhstan
Super-G	Yoo Hye-min; South Korea	Yang Woo-young; South Korea	Olga Vediasheva; Kazakhstan

== Medal table ==
Rank	Nation	Gold	Silver	Bronze	Total
1	South Korea (KOR)	3	3	4	10
2	Japan (JPN)	2	2	0	4
3	Kazakhstan (KAZ)	1	1	2	4
Totals (3 entries)		6	6	6	18

== Participating nations ==
A total of 45 athletes from 12 nations competed in alpine skiing at the 1999 Asian Winter Games:

- China (4)
- Chinese Taipei (3)
- India (4)
- Iran (7)
- Japan (4)
- Kazakhstan (6)
- Kyrgyzstan (1)
- Lebanon (2)
- Mongolia (1)
- Pakistan (2)
- South Korea (9)
- Uzbekistan (2)
