= Alpine skiing at the 1999 Asian Winter Games – Men's super-G =

Men's super-G at the 1999 Asian Winter Games
- Venue: Yongpyong Resort
- Dates: 31 January 1999
- Competitors: 25 from 12 nations

Medalists
gold medal	Hur Seung-wook	South Korea
silver medal	Joji Kawaguchi	Japan
bronze medal	Choi Moon-sung	South Korea

The men's super-G at the 1999 Asian Winter Games was held on 31 January 1999 at the Yongpyong Resort in South Korea.

== Schedule ==
All times are Korea Standard Time (UTC+09:00)

Date	Time	Event
Sunday, 31 January 1999	10:00	Final

== Results ==
Legend

- DNF — Did not finish
- DSQ — Disqualified

Rank	Athlete	Time
1st place, gold medalist(s)	Hur Seung-wook (KOR)	1:26.83
2nd place, silver medalist(s)	Joji Kawaguchi (JPN)	1:27.02
3rd place, bronze medalist(s)	Choi Moon-sung (KOR)	1:27.57
4	Lee Ki-hyun (KOR)	1:27.66
5	Azumi Tajima (JPN)	1:27.73
6	Dmitriy Kvach (KAZ)	1:29.45
7	Danil Anisimov (KAZ)	1:33.30
8	Kamil Urumbaev (UZB)	1:33.99
9	Rostam Kalhor (IRI)	1:35.96
10	Bagher Kalhor (IRI)	1:37.37
11	Huang Hongli (CHN)	1:39.05
12	Alidad Saveh-Shemshaki (IRI)	1:39.38
13	Jin Guangbin (CHN)	1:39.70
14	Hossein Kalhor (IRI)	1:40.94
15	George Salameh (LIB)	1:46.60
16	Andrey Trelevski (KGZ)	1:49.91
17	Chagnaagiin Aranzalzul (MGL)	1:52.54
18	Chu Tai-wei (TPE)	1:59.37
19	Bhag Chand (IND)	2:00.17
—	Qurban Ali (PAK)	DNF
—	Dmitriy Shlajmov (KAZ)	DNF
—	Sarfaraz Ahmad Bajwa (PAK)	DNF
—	Byun Jong-moon (KOR)	DNF
—	Lee Yu-der (TPE)	DNF
—	Nanak Chand Thakur (IND)	DSQ
