= Alpine skiing at the 1999 Asian Winter Games – Men's giant slalom =

Men's slalom at the 1999 Asian Winter Games
- Venue: Yongpyong Resort
- Dates: 2 February 1999
- Competitors: 26 from 12 nations

Medalists
gold medal	Joji Kawaguchi	Japan
silver medal	Hur Seung-wook	South Korea
bronze medal	Lee Ki-hyun	South Korea

The men's giant slalom at the 1999 Asian Winter Games was held on 2 February 1999 at the Yongpyong Resort in South Korea.

== Schedule ==
All times are Korea Standard Time (UTC+09:00)

Date	Time	Event
Tuesday, 2 February 1999	10:00	Final

== Results ==
Legend

- DNF1 — Did not finish run 1
- DNF2 — Did not finish run 2
- DNS1 — Did not start run 1
- DNS2 — Did not start run 2
- DSQ1 — Disqualified run 1
- DSQ2 — Disqualified run 2

Rank	Athlete	Time
1st place, gold medalist(s)	Joji Kawaguchi (JPN)	2:35.40
2nd place, silver medalist(s)	Hur Seung-wook (KOR)	2:35.97
3rd place, bronze medalist(s)	Lee Ki-hyun (KOR)	2:37.41
4	Choi Moon-sung (KOR)	2:38.74
5	Dmitriy Shlajmov (KAZ)	2:45.44
6	Bagher Kalhor (IRI)	2:49.75
7	Danil Anisimov (KAZ)	2:51.85
8	Rostam Kalhor (IRI)	2:55.61
9	Jin Guangbin (CHN)	2:56.84
10	Alidad Saveh-Shemshaki (IRI)	2:58.22
11	George Salameh (LIB)	3:11.59
12	Nanak Chand Thakur (IND)	3:13.47
13	Chafic Khalife (LIB)	3:14.12
14	Andrey Trelevski (KGZ)	3:16.27
15	Bhag Chand (IND)	3:27.70
16	Chu Tai-wei (TPE)	3:35.63
17	Lee Yu-der (TPE)	3:55.87
—	Kamil Urumbaev (UZB)	DNF2
—	Byun Jong-moon (KOR)	DSQ2
—	Chagnaagiin Aranzalzul (MGL)	DNS2
—	Qurban Ali (PAK)	DNF1
—	Dmitriy Kvach (KAZ)	DNF1
—	Hossein Kalhor (IRI)	DNF1
—	Huang Hongli (CHN)	DNF1
—	Azumi Tajima (JPN)	DSQ1
—	Sarfaraz Ahmad Bajwa (PAK)	DNS1
