= Alpine skiing at the 1999 Asian Winter Games – Men's slalom =

Men's slalom at the 1999 Asian Winter Games
- Venue: Yongpyong Resort
- Dates: 4 February 1999
- Competitors: 26 from 12 nations

Medalists
gold medal	Hur Seung-wook	South Korea
silver medal	Joji Kawaguchi	Japan
bronze medal	Choi Moon-sung	South Korea

The men's slalom at the 1999 Asian Winter Games was held on 4 February 1999 at the Yongpyong Resort in South Korea.

== Schedule ==
All times are Korea Standard Time (UTC+09:00)

Date	Time	Event
Thursday, 4 February 1999	10:00	Final

== Results ==
Legend

- DNF1 — Did not finish run 1
- DNF2 — Did not finish run 2
- DNS1 — Did not start run 1
- DSQ2 — Disqualified run 2

Rank	Athlete	Time
1st place, gold medalist(s)	Hur Seung-wook (KOR)	1:54.68
2nd place, silver medalist(s)	Joji Kawaguchi (JPN)	1:55.00
3rd place, bronze medalist(s)	Choi Moon-sung (KOR)	1:56.67
4	Azumi Tajima (JPN)	1:56.90
5	Hong Sung-woo (KOR)	1:58.70
6	Danil Anisimov (KAZ)	2:04.80
7	Kamil Urumbaev (UZB)	2:05.12
8	Huang Hongli (CHN)	2:11.06
9	Bagher Kalhor (IRI)	2:12.00
10	Alidad Saveh-Shemshaki (IRI)	2:15.05
11	George Salameh (LIB)	2:15.53
12	Hossein Kalhor (IRI)	2:16.12
13	Rostam Kalhor (IRI)	2:19.35
14	Chafic Khalife (LIB)	2:20.19
15	Nanak Chand Thakur (IND)	2:58.90
16	Chu Tai-wei (TPE)	3:05.70
17	Bhag Chand (IND)	3:20.55
18	Qurban Ali (PAK)	3:34.62
—	Dmitriy Shlajmov (KAZ)	DNF2
—	Lee Yu-der (TPE)	DSQ2
—	Andrey Trelevski (KGZ)	DNF1
—	Sarfaraz Ahmad Bajwa (PAK)	DNF1
—	Kim Gi-byung (KOR)	DNF1
—	Jin Guangbin (CHN)	DNF1
—	Dmitriy Kvach (KAZ)	DNF1
—	Chagnaagiin Aranzalzul (MGL)	DNS1
