= Alpine skiing at the 1996 Asian Winter Games – Men's super-G =

Men's super-G at the 1996 Asian Winter Games
- Venue: Yabuli Ski Resort
- Dates: 5 February 1996
- Competitors: 41 from 14 nations

Medalists
gold medal	Byun Jong-moon	South Korea
silver medal	Kenta Uraki	Japan
bronze medal	Azumi Tajima	Japan

The men's super-G at the 1996 Asian Winter Games was held on 5 February 1996 at Yabuli Ski Resort in Harbin, China.

== Results ==
Legend

- DNF — Did not finish
- DNS — Did not start
- DSQ — Disqualified

Rank	Athlete	Time
1st place, gold medalist(s)	Byun Jong-moon (KOR)	1:22.58
2nd place, silver medalist(s)	Kenta Uraki (JPN)	1:22.81
3rd place, bronze medalist(s)	Azumi Tajima (JPN)	1:22.82
4	Hur Seung-wook (KOR)	1:23.55
5	Kim Joon-hyung (KOR)	1:24.50
6	Hou Jian (CHN)	1:30.16
7	Yang Hui (CHN)	1:30.25
8	Ren Ligang (CHN)	1:30.29
9	Kamil Urumbaev (UZB)	1:30.74
10	Jin Guangbin (CHN)	1:31.00
11	Rostam Kalhor (IRI)	1:31.39
12	Vladimir Yunusov (UZB)	1:31.63
13	Hassan Shemshaki (IRI)	1:31.92
14	Hossein Kalhor (IRI)	1:33.60
15	Askar Enikeev (UZB)	1:34.24
16	Linar Abdoulin (KGZ)	1:34.41
17	Alidad Saveh-Shemshaki (IRI)	1:34.49
18	Roman Buikov (KGZ)	1:34.69
19	Dmitriy Kovalev (UZB)	1:36.80
20	Enver Ussubaliev (KGZ)	1:38.27
21	Nanak Chand Thakur (IND)	1:41.70
22	Chang Feng-chou (TPE)	1:43.22
23	Chuni Lal Thakur (IND)	1:43.99
24	Lee Ming-tang (TPE)	1:44.05
25	Karomadin Akhioev (TJK)	1:44.98
26	Chafic Hachem (LIB)	1:45.74
27	Murli Dhar (IND)	1:46.10
28	Bhag Chand (IND)	1:46.24
29	Chagnaagiin Aranzalzul (MGL)	1:46.78
30	Bashar Huneidi (KUW)	1:50.92
31	Jean Khalil (LIB)	1:55.80
32	Qurban Ali (PAK)	1:56.63
33	Mateeullah Khan (PAK)	2:16.48
—	Dmitriy Kvach (KAZ)	DNF
—	Mamoru Hayashi (JPN)	DNF
—	Byun Jong-woo (KOR)	DNF
—	George Salameh (LIB)	DSQ
—	Saidakbar Eshonov (TJK)	DSQ
—	Antoine Al-Helou (LIB)	DSQ
—	Tojialy Sakhibov (TJK)	DNS
—	Chagnaagiin Bayarzul (MGL)	DNS
