= Alpine skiing at the 1996 Asian Winter Games =

- Venue: Yabuli Ski Resort
- Dates: 5–8 February 1996
- Competitors: 65 from 14 nations

Alpine skiing at the 1996 Asian Winter Games took place in Harbin, China from 5 to 8 February 1996 with four events contested — two each for men and women.

== Schedule ==
F	Final

Event↓/Date →	5th Mon	6th Tue	7th Wed	8th Thu
Men's giant slalom			F	
Men's super-G	F			
Women's giant slalom				F
Women's super-G		F		

== Medalists ==
=== Men ===
Event	Gold	Silver	Bronze
Giant slalom	Kenta Uraki; Japan	Hur Seung-wook; South Korea	Byun Jong-moon; South Korea
Super-G	Byun Jong-moon; South Korea	Kenta Uraki; Japan	Azumi Tajima; Japan

=== Women ===
Event	Gold	Silver	Bronze
Giant slalom	Olga Vediasheva; Kazakhstan	Fumiyo Uemura; Japan	Tomomi Sato; Japan
Super-G	Fumiyo Uemura; Japan	Olga Vediasheva; Kazakhstan	Junko Yamakawa; Japan

== Medal table ==
Rank	Nation	Gold	Silver	Bronze	Total
1	Japan (JPN)	2	2	3	7
2	South Korea (KOR)	1	1	1	3
3	Kazakhstan (KAZ)	1	1	0	2
Totals (3 entries)		4	4	4	12

== Participating nations ==
A total of 65 athletes from 14 nations competed in alpine skiing at the 1996 Asian Winter Games:

- China (8)
- Chinese Taipei (2)
- India (6)
- Iran (6)
- Japan (6)
- Kazakhstan (4)
- Kuwait (1)
- Kyrgyzstan (3)
- Lebanon (6)
- Mongolia (3)
- Pakistan (4)
- South Korea (6)
- Tajikistan (3)
- Uzbekistan (7)
