= Alpine skiing at the 1999 Asian Winter Games – Women's super-G =

Women's super-G at the 1999 Asian Winter Games
- Venue: Yongpyong Resort
- Dates: 1 February 1999
- Competitors: 16 from 8 nations

Medalists
gold medal	Yoo Hye-min	South Korea
silver medal	Yang Woo-young	South Korea
bronze medal	Olga Vediasheva	Kazakhstan

The women's super-G at the 1999 Asian Winter Games was held on 1 February 1999 at the Yongpyong Resort in South Korea.

== Schedule ==
All times are Korea Standard Time (UTC+09:00)

Date	Time	Event
Monday, 1 February 1999	10:00	Final

== Results ==
Rank	Athlete	Time
1st place, gold medalist(s)	Yoo Hye-min (KOR)	1:12.94
2nd place, silver medalist(s)	Yang Woo-young (KOR)	1:14.54
3rd place, bronze medalist(s)	Olga Vediasheva (KAZ)	1:14.77
4	Kae Nishishita (JPN)	1:15.17
5	Yuliya Krygina (KAZ)	1:16.32
6	Rina Seki (JPN)	1:16.78
7	Kim Sook-hee (KOR)	1:17.81
8	Elmira Urumbaeva (UZB)	1:20.48
9	Li Hongdan (CHN)	1:20.77
10	Galina Sibiryakova (KAZ)	1:25.72
11	Asieh Tir (IRI)	1:25.93
12	Dong Jinzhi (CHN)	1:26.38
13	Zahra Kalhor (IRI)	1:30.14
14	Dicky Dolma (IND)	1:40.15
15	Neha Ahuja (IND)	1:41.66
16	Lee En-ting (TPE)	1:56.98
