= Alpine skiing at the 1999 Asian Winter Games – Women's giant slalom =

Women's giant slalom at the 1999 Asian Winter Games
- Venue: Yongpyong Resort
- Dates: 3 February 1999
- Competitors: 17 from 8 nations

Medalists
gold medal	Olga Vediasheva	Kazakhstan
silver medal	Yoo Hye-min	South Korea
bronze medal	Yuliya Krygina	Kazakhstan

The women's giant slalom at the 1999 Asian Winter Games was held on 3 February 1999 at the Yongpyong Resort in South Korea.

== Schedule ==
All times are Korea Standard Time (UTC+09:00)

Date	Time	Event
Wednesday, 3 February 1999	10:00	Final

== Results ==
Legend

- DNF1 — Did not finish run 1
- DNF2 — Did not finish run 2
- DNS1 — Did not start run 1

Rank	Athlete	Time
1st place, gold medalist(s)	Olga Vediasheva (KAZ)	2:11.27
2nd place, silver medalist(s)	Yoo Hye-min (KOR)	2:11.42
3rd place, bronze medalist(s)	Yuliya Krygina (KAZ)	2:14.65
4	Yang Woo-young (KOR)	2:16.77
5	Kim Sook-hee (KOR)	2:19.86
6	Dong Jinzhi (CHN)	2:25.50
7	Elmira Urumbaeva (UZB)	2:30.26
8	Galina Sibiryakova (KAZ)	2:36.93
9	Asieh Tir (IRI)	2:42.24
10	Fatemeh Saveh-Shemshaki (IRI)	2:53.67
11	Neha Ahuja (IND)	3:05.32
12	Lee En-ting (TPE)	3:08.47
—	Li Hongdan (CHN)	DNF2
—	Kae Nishishita (JPN)	DNF2
—	Zahra Kalhor (IRI)	DNF1
—	Dicky Dolma (IND)	DNF1
—	Rina Seki (JPN)	DNS1
