= Alpine skiing at the 1996 Asian Winter Games – Men's giant slalom =

Men's giant slalom at the 1996 Asian Winter Games
- Venue: Yabuli Ski Resort
- Dates: 7 February 1996
- Competitors: 41 from 14 nations

Medalists
gold medal	Kenta Uraki	Japan
silver medal	Hur Seung-wook	South Korea
bronze medal	Byun Jong-moon	South Korea

The men's giant slalom at the 1996 Asian Winter Games was held on 7 February 1996 at Yabuli Ski Resort in China.

== Results ==
Legend

- DNF1 — Did not finish run 1
- DSQ1 — Disqualified run 1
- DSQ2 — Disqualified run 2

Rank	Athlete	Time
1st place, gold medalist(s)	Kenta Uraki (JPN)	2:03.31
2nd place, silver medalist(s)	Hur Seung-wook (KOR)	2:03.73
3rd place, bronze medalist(s)	Byun Jong-moon (KOR)	2:04.21
4	Azumi Tajima (JPN)	2:04.95
5	Byun Jong-woo (KOR)	2:06.19
6	Hou Jian (CHN)	2:14.64
7	Jin Guangbin (CHN)	2:16.67
8	Rostam Kalhor (IRI)	2:17.19
9	Yang Hui (CHN)	2:17.90
10	Kamil Urumbaev (UZB)	2:18.07
11	Hassan Shemshaki (IRI)	2:19.11
12	Vladimir Yunusov (UZB)	2:19.32
13	Hossein Kalhor (IRI)	2:20.54
14	Askar Enikeev (UZB)	2:21.80
15	Alidad Saveh-Shemshaki (IRI)	2:22.61
16	Linar Abdoulin (KGZ)	2:23.96
17	Jean Khalil (LIB)	2:24.22
18	Roman Buikov (KGZ)	2:26.08
19	Dmitriy Kovalev (UZB)	2:26.13
20	Chang Feng-chou (TPE)	2:26.80
21	George Salameh (LIB)	2:26.98
22	Chuni Lal Thakur (IND)	2:30.89
23	Nanak Chand Thakur (IND)	2:33.64
24	Bhag Chand (IND)	2:34.28
25	Lee Ming-tang (TPE)	2:35.47
26	Chafic Hachem (LIB)	2:36.60
27	Karomadin Akhioev (TJK)	2:40.05
28	Bashar Huneidi (KUW)	2:42.94
29	Chagnaagiin Aranzalzul (MGL)	2:43.81
30	Murli Dhar (IND)	2:53.21
31	Abdul Amin (PAK)	2:57.58
32	Tariq Khan (PAK)	3:11.94
33	Chagnaagiin Bayarzul (MGL)	3:14.68
—	Tojialy Sakhibov (TJK)	DSQ2
—	Antoine Al-Helou (LIB)	DSQ2
—	Saidakbar Eshonov (TJK)	DSQ2
—	Dmitriy Kvach (KAZ)	DNF1
—	Ren Ligang (CHN)	DNF1
—	Mamoru Hayashi (JPN)	DNF1
—	Kim Joon-hyung (KOR)	DSQ1
—	Enver Ussubaliev (KGZ)	DSQ1
