= Alpine skiing at the 1999 Asian Winter Games – Women's slalom =

Women's slalom, Asian Winter Games

Women's slalom at the 1999 Asian Winter Games
- Venue: Yongpyong Resort
- Dates: 5 February 1999
- Competitors: 17 from 8 nations

Medalists
gold medal	Rina Seki	Japan
silver medal	Olga Vediasheva	Kazakhstan
bronze medal	Yoo Hye-min	South Korea

The women's slalom at the 1999 Asian Winter Games was held on 5 February 1999 at the Yongpyong Resort in South Korea.

== Schedule ==
All times are Korea Standard Time (UTC+09:00)

Date	Time	Event
Friday, 5 February 1999	10:00	Final

== Results ==
Legend

- DNF1 — Did not finish run 1
- DNF2 — Did not finish run 2
- DSQ2 — Disqualified run 2

Rank	Athlete	Time
1st place, gold medalist(s)	Rina Seki (JPN)	1:47.57
2nd place, silver medalist(s)	Olga Vediasheva (KAZ)	1:49.34
3rd place, bronze medalist(s)	Yoo Hye-min (KOR)	1:49.78
4	Yuliya Krygina (KAZ)	1:49.88
5	Kae Nishishita (JPN)	1:53.16
6	Yang Woo-young (KOR)	1:53.94
7	Zahra Kalhor (IRI)	2:24.89
8	Fatemeh Saveh-Shemshaki (IRI)	2:35.25
9	Neha Ahuja (IND)	2:51.06
10	Lee En-ting (TPE)	2:55.63
—	Kim Sook-hee (KOR)	DNF2
—	Dicky Dolma (IND)	DSQ2
—	Asieh Tir (IRI)	DNF1
—	Elmira Urumbaeva (UZB)	DNF1
—	Dong Jinzhi (CHN)	DNF1
—	Li Hongdan (CHN)	DNF1
—	Galina Sibiryakova (KAZ)	DNF1
