= Alpine skiing at the 1996 Asian Winter Games – Women's super-G =

Women's super-G at the 1996 Asian Winter Games
- Venue: Yabuli Ski Resort
- Dates: 6 February 1996
- Competitors: 20 from 8 nations

Medalists
gold medal	Fumiyo Uemura	Japan
silver medal	Olga Vediasheva	Kazakhstan
bronze medal	Junko Yamakawa	Japan

The women's super-G at the 1996 Asian Winter Games was held on 6 February 1996 at Yabuli Ski Resort in Harbin, China.

== Results ==
Legend

- DNS — Did not start

Rank	Athlete	Time
1st place, gold medalist(s)	Fumiyo Uemura (JPN)	1:09.57
2nd place, silver medalist(s)	Olga Vediasheva (KAZ)	1:09.81
3rd place, bronze medalist(s)	Junko Yamakawa (JPN)	1:11.45
4	Yelena Semiglazova (KAZ)	1:11.51
5	Tomomi Sato (JPN)	1:11.69
6	Li Xueqin (CHN)	1:12.97
7	Chung Hye-in (KOR)	1:13.53
8	Yuliya Krygina (KAZ)	1:14.15
9	Li Xueling (CHN)	1:14.32
10	Wang Chunyan (CHN)	1:15.31
11	Chee In (KOR)	1:15.41
12	Dong Jinzhi (CHN)	1:16.33
13	Elmira Urumbaeva (UZB)	1:18.12
14	Ekaterina Aleksandrova (UZB)	1:22.82
15	Aleksandra Tkachenko (UZB)	1:23.31
16	Asieh Tir (IRI)	1:27.78
17	Zahra Kalhor (IRI)	1:29.76
18	Shefali Ahuja (IND)	1:41.90
19	Uma Kumari (IND)	2:08.25
—	Chagnaagiin Nyamzul (MGL)	DNS
