= Cross-country skiing at the 1999 Asian Winter Games – Men's 4 × 10 kilometre relay =

Men's 4 × 10 kilometre relay at the 1999 Asian Winter Games
- Venue: Provincial Nordic Venue
- Dates: 2 February 1999
- Competitors: 28 from 7 nations

Medalists
gold medal	Kazakhstan; Pavel Ryabinin, Igor Zubrilin, Andrey Nevzorov, Vladimir Smirnov
silver medal	Japan; Katsuhito Ebisawa, Takeshi Sato, Mitsuo Horigome, Hiroyuki Imai
bronze medal	South Korea; Park Byung-joo, Park Byung-chul, Shin Doo-sun, Ahn Jin-soo

The men's 4 × 10 kilometre relay at the 1999 Asian Winter Games was held on February 2, 1999, at Yongpyong Cross Country Venue, South Korea.

== Schedule ==
All times are Korea Standard Time (UTC+09:00)

Date	Time	Event
Tuesday, 2 February 1999	10:00	Final

== Results ==
Rank	Team	Time
1st place, gold medalist(s)	Kazakhstan (KAZ)	1:41:12.8
	Pavel Ryabinin	
	Igor Zubrilin	
	Andrey Nevzorov	
	Vladimir Smirnov	
2nd place, silver medalist(s)	Japan (JPN)	1:42:18.3
	Katsuhito Ebisawa	
	Takeshi Sato	
	Mitsuo Horigome	
	Hiroyuki Imai	
3rd place, bronze medalist(s)	South Korea (KOR)	1:47:41.8
	Park Byung-joo	
	Park Byung-chul	
	Shin Doo-sun	
	Ahn Jin-soo	
4	China (CHN)	1:47:44.1
	Xu Zhongcheng	
	Han Dawei	
	Qu Donghai	
	Wu Jintao	
5	Mongolia (MGL)	2:12:19.2
	Gombojavyn Gantulga	
	Jargalyn Erdenetülkhüür	
	Dagvadorjiin Ochirsükh	
	Davaasürengiin Undrakh	
6	Iran (IRI)	
	Bahaeddin Seid	
	Mostafa Mirhashemi	
	Mojtaba Mirhashemi	
	Mohammad Taghi Shemshaki	
7	India (IND)	
	Shanti Prasad	
	Cheering Namgyal	
	Thondup Namgyal	
	Karma Smasthan	
