= Cross-country skiing at the 1999 Asian Winter Games – Men's 15 kilometre classical =

Asian winter games discipline in 1999

Men's 15 kilometre classical at the 1999 Asian Winter Games
- Venue: Provincial Nordic Venue
- Dates: 31 January 1999
- Competitors: 25 from 7 nations

Medalists
gold medal	Vladimir Smirnov	Kazakhstan
silver medal	Pavel Ryabinin	Kazakhstan
bronze medal	Andrey Nevzorov	Kazakhstan

The men's 15 kilometre classical at the 1999 Asian Winter Games was held on January 31, 1999 at Yongpyong Cross Country Venue, South Korea.

== Schedule ==
All times are Korea Standard Time (UTC+09:00)

Date	Time	Event
Sunday, 31 January 1999	10:00	Final

== Results ==
Legend

- DSQ — Disqualified

Rank	Athlete	Time
1st place, gold medalist(s)	Vladimir Smirnov (KAZ)	37:09.0
2nd place, silver medalist(s)	Pavel Ryabinin (KAZ)	38:08.3
3rd place, bronze medalist(s)	Andrey Nevzorov (KAZ)	38:53.8
4	Katsuhito Ebisawa (JPN)	39:04.8
5	Mitsuo Horigome (JPN)	39:13.6
6	Takeshi Sato (JPN)	39:43.7
7	Igor Zubrilin (KAZ)	39:52.7
8	Park Byung-chul (KOR)	39:53.9
9	Hiroyuki Imai (JPN)	40:17.9
10	Xu Zhongcheng (CHN)	41:27.0
11	Park Byung-joo (KOR)	41:46.1
12	Han Dawei (CHN)	41:58.6
13	Hwang Jun-nam (KOR)	44:22.3
14	Dagvadorjiin Ochirsükh (MGL)	47:33.2
15	Gombojavyn Gantulga (MGL)	47:41.2
16	Jargalyn Erdenetülkhüür (MGL)	51:51.2
17	Mohammad Taghi Shemshaki (IRI)	52:21.3
18	Mojtaba Mirhashemi (IRI)	53:45.0
19	Mostafa Mirhashemi (IRI)	54:08.4
20	Bahaeddin Seid (IRI)	57:07.2
21	Karma Smasthan (IND)	1:02:09.7
22	Cheering Namgyal (IND)	1:05:09.2
23	Shanti Prasad (IND)	1:05:57.9
24	Thondup Namgyal (IND)	1:16:46.1
—	Enkhtöriin Battogtokh (MGL)	DSQ
