= Alpine skiing at the 1996 Asian Winter Games – Women's giant slalom =

Women's giant slalom at the 1996 Asian Winter Games
- Venue: Yabuli Ski Resort
- Dates: 8 February 1996
- Competitors: 21 from 8 nations

Medalists
gold medal	Olga Vediasheva	Kazakhstan
silver medal	Fumiyo Uemura	Japan
bronze medal	Tomomi Sato	Japan

The women's giant slalom at the 1996 Asian Winter Games was held on 8 February 1996 at Yabuli Ski Resort in Harbin, China. Olga Vediasheva from Kazakhstan won the gold medal.

== Results ==
Legend

- DNF1 — Did not finish run 1

Rank	Athlete	Time
1st place, gold medalist(s)	Olga Vediasheva (KAZ)	1:44.71
2nd place, silver medalist(s)	Fumiyo Uemura (JPN)	1:45.28
3rd place, bronze medalist(s)	Tomomi Sato (JPN)	1:46.97
4	Junko Yamakawa (JPN)	1:47.05
5	Yelena Semiglazova (KAZ)	1:50.02
6	Yuliya Krygina (KAZ)	1:51.03
7	Li Xueqin (CHN)	1:53.10
8	Dong Jinzhi (CHN)	1:55.35
9	Chung Hye-in (KOR)	1:55.51
10	Chee In (KOR)	1:56.80
11	Wang Chunyan (CHN)	1:57.28
12	Elmira Urumbaeva (UZB)	1:58.35
13	Aleksandra Tkachenko (UZB)	2:03.59
14	Ekaterina Aleksandrova (UZB)	2:06.58
15	Asieh Tir (IRI)	2:11.94
16	Zahra Kalhor (IRI)	2:14.62
17	Yara Feghali (LIB)	2:19.07
18	Rita Feghali (LIB)	2:22.56
19	Shefali Ahuja (IND)	2:26.72
20	Uma Kumari (IND)	2:32.89
—	Li Xueling (CHN)	DNF1
