= Cross-country skiing at the 1999 Asian Winter Games – Men's 30 kilometre freestyle =

Men's 30 kilometre freestyle at the 1999 Asian Winter Games
- Venue: Provincial Nordic Venue
- Dates: 4 February 1999
- Competitors: 21 from 7 nations

Medalists
gold medal	Andrey Nevzorov	Kazakhstan
silver medal	Vladimir Smirnov	Kazakhstan
bronze medal	Mitsuo Horigome	Japan

The men's 30 kilometre freestyle at the 1999 Asian Winter Games was held on February 4, 1999 at Yongpyong Cross Country Venue, South Korea.

== Schedule ==
All times are Korea Standard Time (UTC+09:00)

Date	Time	Event
Thursday, 4 February 1999	10:00	Final

== Results ==
Legend

- DNF — Did not finish
- DNS — Did not start

Rank	Athlete	Time
1st place, gold medalist(s)	Andrey Nevzorov (KAZ)	1:13:19.2
2nd place, silver medalist(s)	Vladimir Smirnov (KAZ)	1:13:30.0
3rd place, bronze medalist(s)	Mitsuo Horigome (JPN)	1:14:04.9
4	Pavel Ryabinin (KAZ)	1:14:30.1
5	Hiroyuki Imai (JPN)	1:16:46.5
6	Takeshi Sato (JPN)	1:17:31.2
7	Wu Jintao (CHN)	1:17:35.5
8	Park Byung-chul (KOR)	1:18:29.4
9	Han Dawei (CHN)	1:18:34.9
10	Qu Donghai (CHN)	1:20:32.2
11	Shin Doo-sun (KOR)	1:20:58.3
12	Park Byung-joo (KOR)	1:21:20.6
13	Ahn Jin-soo (KOR)	1:22:12.2
14	Andrey Kustov (KAZ)	1:24:40.9
15	Mohammad Taghi Shemshaki (IRI)	1:34:21.8
16	Dagvadorjiin Ochirsükh (MGL)	1:36:16.7
17	Gombojavyn Gantulga (MGL)	1:37:15.0
18	Mostafa Mirhashemi (IRI)	1:37:17.1
—	Mojtaba Mirhashemi (IRI)	DNF
—	Xu Zhongcheng (CHN)	DNF
—	Karma Smasthan (IND)	DNS
