= Alpine skiing at the 2002 Winter Olympics – Men's slalom =

Men's slalom at the XIX Olympic Winter Games
- Pictogram for alpine skiing
- Venue: Deer Valley
- Date: February 23, 2002
- Competitors: 78 from 43 nations
- Winning time: 1:41.06

Medalists
1st place, gold medalist(s)		Jean-Pierre Vidal	France
2nd place, silver medalist(s)		Sébastien Amiez	France
3rd place, bronze medalist(s)		Benjamin Raich	Austria

The event was held on February 23 at Deer Valley. Pre-race favorite Bode Miller fell off the course in the second run, and many of the other top competitors struggled with an extremely challenging course.

Alain Baxter of Great Britain originally took the bronze, but was disqualified after testing positive for traces of methamphetamine. This apparently occurred because Baxter had used a Vicks inhaler from Canada, which had a slightly different chemical content from the legal British Vicks inhaler.

== Results ==
Complete results from the men's slalom event at the 2002 Winter Olympics.

Rank	Name	Country	Run 1	Run 2	Time	Difference
1st place, gold medalist(s)	Jean-Pierre Vidal	France	48.01	53.05	1:41.06	
2nd place, silver medalist(s)	Sébastien Amiez	France	50.16	51.66	1:41.82	+0.76
3rd place, bronze medalist(s)	Benjamin Raich	Austria	49.34	53.07	1:42.41	+1.35
4	Kilian Albrecht	Austria	50.26	52.19	1:42.45	+1.39
5	Urs Imboden	Switzerland	49.61	52.87	1:42.48	+1.42
6	Kjetil André Aamodt	Norway	49.92	52.80	1:42.72	+1.66
7	Markus Larsson	Sweden	50.29	52.57	1:42.86	+1.80
8	Jure Košir	Slovenia	49.80	53.54	1:43.34	+2.28
9	Ole Kristian Furuseth	Norway	51.03	53.36	1:44.39	+3.33
10	Andrzej Bachleda	Poland	51.43	53.22	1:44.65	+3.59
11	Chip Knight	United States	50.85	54.01	1:44.86	+3.80
12	Tom Stiansen	Norway	50.74	54.45	1:45.19	+4.13
13	Erik Schlopy	United States	51.27	53.94	1:45.21	+4.15
14	Michael von Grünigen	Switzerland	51.38	53.97	1:45.35	+4.29
15	Stanley Hayer	Czech Republic	51.97	54.15	1:46.12	+5.06
16	Thomas Grandi	Canada	51.15	55.08	1:46.23	+5.17
17	Cristian Javier Simari Birkner	Argentina	51.55	55.27	1:46.82	+5.76
18	Kiminobu Kimura	Japan	52.46	55.97	1:48.43	+7.37
19	Michal Rajčan	Slovakia	52.73	55.93	1:48.66	+7.60
20	Noel Baxter	Great Britain	53.66	55.98	1:49.64	+8.58
21	Kristinn Björnsson	Iceland	53.05	56.76	1:49.81	+8.75
22	Gareth Trayner	Great Britain	54.58	56.33	1:50.91	+9.85
23	Angel Pumpalov	Bulgaria	53.72	58.21	1:51.93	+10.87
24	Bode Miller	United States	48.37	1:04.42	1:52.79	+11.73
25	Ivars Ciaguns	Latvia	56.31	58.42	1:54.73	+13.67
26	Marko Đorđević	FR Yugoslavia	55.95	1:00.04	1:55.99	+14.93
27	Alexander Heath	South Africa	56.37	1:00.56	1:56.93	+15.87
28	Johann F. Haraldsson	Iceland	56.98	1:00.19	1:57.17	+16.11
29	Tahir Bisic	Bosnia and Herzegovina	57.55	1:00.17	1:57.72	+16.66
30	Kang Min Heuk	South Korea	58.01	1:00.47	1:58.48	+17.42
31	Byun Jong Moon	South Korea	58.38	1:03.20	2:01.58	+20.52
32	Atakan Alaftargil	Turkey	1:03.10	1:07.26	2:10.36	+29.30
33	Péter Vincze	Hungary	1:01.46	1:14.11	2:15.57	+34.51
	Mitja Kunc	Slovenia	51.08	DNF		
	Ivica Kostelić	Croatia	49.60	DNF		
	Pierrick Bourgeat	France	50.54	DNF		
	Drago Grubelnik	Slovenia	50.51	DNF		
	Rene Mlekuž	Slovenia	50.57	DNF		
	Markus Ganahl	Liechtenstein	51.85	DNF		
	Tom Rothrock	United States	50.61	DNF		
	Ondřej Bank	Czech Republic	52.37	DNF		
	Niki Fürstauer	Lebanon	51.99	DNF		
	Alex Antor	Andorra	54.57	DNF		
	Michael Dickson	Australia	56.88	DNF		
	Nikolay Skriabin	Ukraine	56.76	DNF		
	Theodoros Christodoulou	Cyprus	59.74	DNF		
	Kamil Urumbaev	Uzbekistan	1:04.09	DNF		
	Alain Baxter	Great Britain	50.16	DSQ		
	Hur Seung Wook	South Korea	56.70	DSQ		
	Vassilis Dimitriadis	Greece	55.24	DSQ		
	Bořek Zakouřil	Czech Republic	DNS			
	Rainer Schönfelder	Austria	DNF			
	Giorgio Rocca	Italy	DNF			
	Kalle Palander	Finland	DNF			
	Manfred Pranger	Austria	DNF			
	Markus Eberle	Germany	DNF			
	Jean-Philippe Roy	Canada	DNF			
	Truls Ove Karlsen	Norway	DNF			
	Edoardo Zardini	Italy	DNF			
	Giancarlo Bergamelli	Italy	DNF			
	Alan Perathoner	Italy	DNF			
	Akira Sasaki	Japan	DNF			
	Stefan Georgiev	Bulgaria	DNF			
	Jan Holicky	Czech Republic	DNF			
	Björgvin Björgvinsson	Iceland	DNF			
	Todd Haywood	New Zealand	DNF			
	Ivan Heimschild	Slovakia	DNF			
	Kristinn Magnusson	Iceland	DNF			
	Jesse Teat	New Zealand	DNF			
	Lee Ki-hyun	South Korea	DNF			
	Danil Anisimov	Kazakhstan	DNF			
	Dejan Panovski	Macedonia	DNF			
	Laurence Thoms	Fiji	DNF			
	Robert Makharashvili	Georgia	DNF			
	Bagher Kalhor	Iran	DNF			
	Arsen Harutyunyan	Armenia	DNF			
	Elbrus Isakov	Azerbaijan	DNF			
	Kentaro Minagawa	Japan	DSQ			
