= Iran at the 1999 Asian Winter Games =

- IOC code: IRI
- NOC: National Olympic Committee of the Islamic Republic of Iran

in Kangwon
- Competitors: 11 in 1 sport
- Medals: Gold 0 Silver 0 Bronze 0 Total 0

Asian Winter Games appearances
- 1990; 1996; 1999; 2003; 2007; 2011; 2017; 2025; 2029

Iran participated in the 1999 Asian Winter Games held in Kangwon, South Korea from January 30, 1999 to February 6, 1999.

== Competitors ==
Sport	Men	Women	Total
Alpine skiing	4	3	7
Cross-country skiing	4		4
Total	8	3	11

== Results by event ==
=== Skiing ===
==== Alpine ====
Athlete	Event	Time	Rank
Bagher Kalhor	Men's slalom	2:12.00	9
Hossein Kalhor	Men's slalom	2:16.12	12
Rostam Kalhor	Men's slalom	2:19.35	13
Alidad Saveh-Shemshaki	Men's slalom	2:15.05	10
Bagher Kalhor	Men's giant slalom	2:49.75	6
Hossein Kalhor	Men's giant slalom	Did not finish	—
Rostam Kalhor	Men's giant slalom	2:55.61	8
Alidad Saveh-Shemshaki	Men's giant slalom	2:58.22	10
Bagher Kalhor	Men's super-G	1:37.37	10
Hossein Kalhor	Men's super-G	1:40.94	14
Rostam Kalhor	Men's super-G	1:35.96	9
Alidad Saveh-Shemshaki	Men's super-G	1:39.38	12
Zahra Kalhor	Women's slalom	2:24.89	7
Fatemeh Saveh-Shemshaki	Women's slalom	2:35.25	8
Asieh Tir	Women's slalom	Did not finish	—
Zahra Kalhor	Women's giant slalom	Did not finish	—
Fatemeh Saveh-Shemshaki	Women's giant slalom	2:53.67	10
Asieh Tir	Women's giant slalom	2:42.24	9
Zahra Kalhor	Women's super-G	1:30.14	13
Asieh Tir	Women's super-G	1:25.93	11

==== Cross-country ====
Athlete	Event	Time	Rank
Mojtaba Mirhashemi	Men's 15 km classical	53:45.0	18
Mostafa Mirhashemi	Men's 15 km classical	54:08.4	19
Bahaeddin Seid	Men's 15 km classical	57:07.2	20
Mohammad Taghi Shemshaki	Men's 15 km classical	52:21.3	17
Mojtaba Mirhashemi	Men's 30 km freestyle	Did not finish	—
Mostafa Mirhashemi	Men's 30 km freestyle	1:37:17.1	18
Mohammad Taghi Shemshaki	Men's 30 km freestyle	1:34:21.8	15
Bahaeddin Seid; Mostafa Mirhashemi; Mojtaba Mirhashemi; Mohammad Taghi Shemshaki	Men's 4 × 10 km relay		6
