= Iran at the 1996 Asian Winter Games =

- IOC code: IRI
- NOC: National Olympic Committee of the Islamic Republic of Iran

in Harbin
- Competitors: 6 in 1 sport
- Medals: Gold 0 Silver 0 Bronze 0 Total 0

Asian Winter Games appearances
- 1990; 1996; 1999; 2003; 2007; 2011; 2017; 2025; 2029

Iran participated in the 1996 Asian Winter Games held in Harbin, China from February 4, 1996 to February 11, 1996.

== Competitors ==
Sport	Men	Women	Total
Alpine skiing	4	2	6
Total	4	2	6

== Results by event ==
=== Skiing ===
==== Alpine ====
Athlete	Event	Time	Rank
Hossein Kalhor	Men's giant slalom	2:20.54	13
Rostam Kalhor	Men's giant slalom	2:17.19	8
Alidad Saveh-Shemshaki	Men's giant slalom	2:22.61	15
Hassan Shemshaki	Men's giant slalom	2:19.11	11
Hossein Kalhor	Men's super-G	1:33.60	14
Rostam Kalhor	Men's super-G	1:31.39	11
Alidad Saveh-Shemshaki	Men's super-G	1:34.49	17
Hassan Shemshaki	Men's super-G	1:31.39	13
Zahra Kalhor	Women's giant slalom	2:14.62	16
Asieh Tir	Women's giant slalom	2:11.94	15
Zahra Kalhor	Women's super-G	1:29.76	17
Asieh Tir	Women's super-G	1:27.78	16
