= Shchyotkin =

Shchyotkin, Schyotkin, Shchetkin, Schetkin or Shchotkin (Russian: Щёткин, from щетка meaning brush) is a Russian masculine surname, its feminine counterpart is Shchyotkina, Schyotkina, Shchetkina, Schetkina or Shchotkina. It may refer to

- Aleksey Shchotkin (born 1991), Kazakhstani football player
- Denis Shchetkin (born 1982), Kazakhstani football player
