= Robert Makharashvili =

Georgian alpine skier (born 1981)

Personal information
- Nationality: Georgian
- Born: 6 October 1981 (age 43); Tbilisi, Soviet Union

Sport
- Sport: Alpine skiing

Robert Makharashvili (born 6 October 1981) is a Georgian alpine skier. He competed in the men's slalom at the 2002 Winter Olympics.
