= India at the 2011 Asian Winter Games =

- IOC code: IND
- NOC: Indian Olympic Association

in Astana and Almaty
- Competitors: 11 in 2 sports
- Flag bearer: Tashi Lundup
- Medals: Gold 0 Silver 0 Bronze 0 Total 0

Asian Winter Games appearances
- 1986; 1990; 1996; 1999; 2003; 2007; 2011; 2017; 2025; 2029

India participated in the 2011 Asian Winter Games in 2 sports sending 11 athletes. India did not win any medals.

== Alpine skiing ==
Men

Athlete	Time (Super-G)	Time (Slalom)	Time (combined)	Rank
Jamyang Namgial	1:18.66			
Hira Lal	1:21.75	59.67	2:15.09	12
Ludar Chand	1:22.12	57.27	2:19.39	13

== Cross country skiing ==
Men

Athlete	Event	Time	Rank
Tashi Lundup	15 km free	1:00:48.3	5
Nadeem Iqbal	15 km free	1:05:32.1	6
Nadeem Iqbal; Tashi Lundup; Hemant Kumar; Bilal Ahmed	4×10 km relay	2:34:53.2	4

Women

Athlete	Event	Time	Rank
Bhuwneshwari Thakur	10 km free	56:05.6	9
Phuntsog Yangdon	10 km free	1:06:01.1	10
Bhuwneshwari Thakur; Mehjabeen Akhter; Phuntsog Yangdon; Masooda Akhter	4×5 km relay	1:53:11.0	5
