= India at the 2007 Asian Winter Games =

- IOC code: IND
- NOC: Indian Olympic Association

in Changchun
- Competitors: 5
- Medals Ranked 7th: Gold 0 Silver 0 Bronze 0 Total 0

Asian Winter Games appearances
- 1986; 1990; 1996; 1999; 2003; 2007; 2011; 2017; 2025; 2029

India participated in the 2007 Asian Winter Games held in Changchun, China from 28 January 2007 to 4 February 2007.
