= India at the 1990 Asian Winter Games =

India at the 1986 Asian Winter Games
- IOC code: IND
- NOC: Indian Olympic Association

in Sapporo
- Competitors: 12
- Medals Ranked 6th: Gold 0 Silver 0 Bronze 0 Total 0

Asian Winter Games appearances
- 1986; 1990; 1996; 1999; 2003; 2007; 2011; 2017; 2025; 2029

India participated in the 1990 Asian Winter Games held in Sapporo, Hokkaidō, Japan, from March 9 to March 14. India failed to win any medal in the Games. One of the national Indian skiers at the Games was Khem Raj Thakur.
