= Gareth Trayner =

British alpine skier (born 1980)

Gareth Trayner (born 7 June 1980) is a British former alpine skier who represented Great Britain at the 2002 Winter Olympics in Salt Lake City. Trayner specialised in Slalom and Giant Slalom. He placed twenty second in the men's slalom at the 2002 winter games. Trayner officially retired from competitive ski racing in 2004.

== See also ==
Alpine skiing at the 2002 Winter Olympics - Men's slalom
