= Elbrus Isakov =

Azerbaijani alpine skier (born 1981)

Personal information
- Nationality: Azerbaijani
- Born: 1 March 1981 (age 44); Rustavi, Soviet Union

Sport
- Sport: Alpine skiing

Elbrus Isakov (born 1 March 1981) is an Azerbaijani alpine skier. He competed in the men's slalom at the 2002 Winter Olympics.
