= India at the 2003 Asian Winter Games =

- IOC code: IND
- NOC: Indian Olympic Association

in Aomori
- Competitors: 8
- Medals Ranked 8th: Gold 0 Silver 0 Bronze 0 Total 0

Asian Winter Games appearances
- 1986; 1990; 1996; 1999; 2003; 2007; 2011; 2017; 2025; 2029

India participated in the 2003 Asian Winter Games held in Aomori Prefecture, Japan, from February 1 to February 8. India failed to win any medals in the Games.
