= Michael Dickson (skier) =

Australian alpine skier (born 1975)

Personal information
- Nationality: Australia
- Born: 3 September 1975 (age 50) Sydney, Australia

Sport
- Sport: Alpine skiing
- Event: Slalom

Michael Dickson (born 3 September 1975) is an Australian alpine skier. He competed in the men's slalom at the 2002 Winter Olympics.
