= Igor Gramotkin =

- Ігор Іванович Грамоткін
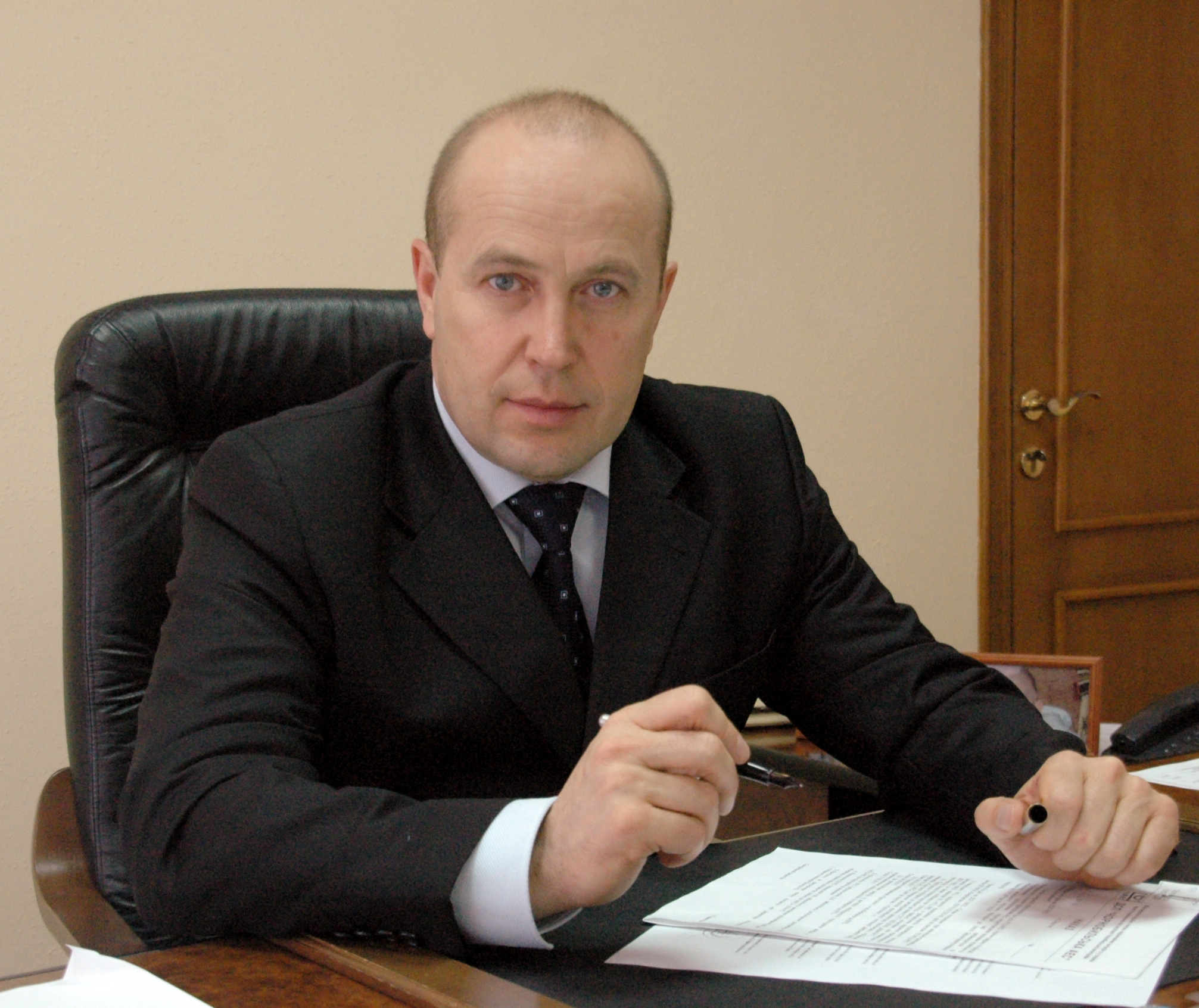
- Born: Igor Ivanovych Gramotkin; July 17, 1964 (age 60); Leninogorsk, East Kazakhstan Region, Kazakh SSR USSR
- Citizenship: Ukraine
- Occupation(s): General Director, Chernobyl NPP

Igor Ivanovich Gramotkin (Ukrainian: Ігор Іва́нович Гра́моткін (July 17, 1964) is the General Director of State Specialized Enterprise Chernobyl Nuclear Power Plant since 2005.

== Biography ==
=== Education ===
In 1988 he graduated in Tomsk Polytechnic institute as an engineer-physicist.

=== Activity ===
He started his labor activity as the laboratory assistant at chair in Tomsk Polytechnic Institute. Then he became the student and was graduated in the same institute on a profession "physical and power installations ", the engineer-physicist.

From 1988 to 1995 he worked at Chernobyl NPP as the operator of gr 6, engineer, Shift Supervisor in the Reactor shop and Plant's Deputy Shift Supervisor of Operating Management Team.

From 1995 to 2001 he was the official representative of Polish Enterprise Budowlano-Handlowe "Zalubski" for Ukraine and CIS countries. He was Chairman of the Supervisory Council "Technical Center Energy".

From 2001 to February 2005 he was the Deputy Director For Human Resource Service at DE "Zaporozhye NPP" SE NEGC "Energoatom".

Since August 11, 2005 he is the SSE ChNPP General Director.
