= Andrey Kolotvin =

Kazakhstani alpine skier (born 1972)

Personal information
- Nationality: Kazakhstani
- Born: 21 January 1972 (age 54)

Sport
- Sport: Alpine skiing

Andrey Kolotvin (Андрей Константинович Колотвин, born 21 January 1972) is a Kazakhstani alpine skier. He competed in two events at the 1994 Winter Olympics.
