= Yury Ivanov (footballer, born 1972) =

Kazakhstani footballer

Personal information
- Date of birth: 30 March 1972
- Date of death: 1995
- Place of death: Aktobe, Kazakhstan
- Height: 1.75 m (5 ft 9 in)
- Position: Midfielder

Senior career*
Years	Team	Apps	(Gls)
1989–1992	FC Aktyubinets	95	(14)
1993	FC Kolos Krasnodar	36	(3)
1994	FC Lada Togliatti	5	(0)
- * Club domestic league appearances and goals

Yury Ivanov (Russian: Юрий Иванов; born 30 March 1972; died in 1995) was a Kazakhstani football player.
