= Svetlana Stupina =

Kazakhstani footballer

Personal information
- Date of birth: 31 October 2001 (age 25)
- Position: Forward

Team information
- Current team: Zhas Kyran

Senior career*
Years	Team	Apps	(Gls)
- Zhas Kyran

International career^{‡}
2018–2019	Kazakhstan U19	6	(0)
2020–	Kazakhstan	2	(0)
- * Club domestic league appearances and goals ‡ National team caps and goals as of 1 December 2020.

Svetlana Stupina (Kazakh: Светлана Ступина; born 31 October 2001) is a Kazakhstani footballer who plays as a forward for Zhas Kyran and the Kazakhstan women's national team.

== Club career ==
Stupina has played for Zhas Kyran in Kazakhstan.

== International career ==
Stupina capped for Kazakhstan at senior level during the UEFA Women's Euro 2022 qualifying.
