= Yevgeniy Pavlov =

Kazakh boxer (born 1999)

Personal information
- Nationality: Kazakh
- Born: Евгений Павлов; 28 September 1999 (age 26) Petropavl, Kazakhstan
- Height: 5 ft 9.5 in (177 cm)
- Weight: Super bantamweight

Boxing career
- Stance: Southpaw

Boxing record
- Total fights: 8
- Wins: 8
- Win by KO: 6

Yevgeniy Pavlov (born 28 September 1999) is a Kazakh professional boxer, who has held the WBA International super bantamweight title since 2021.

== Professional boxing career ==
Pavlov made his professional debut against Patrik Renato Horvath on 26 July 2020. He won the fight by a second-round knockout. Pavlov next faced Goodluck Mrema on 31 October 2020. He once again won the fight by a second-round stoppage. Pavlov faced Alie Laurel on 16 December 2020, in his final fight of the year. He won the fight by unanimous decision, the first one of his professional career, with scores of 60–53, 60-53 and 60–54.

Pavlov was booked to face Nasibu Ramadhani on 20 May 2021, in his first fight of the year. He won the fight by a fifth-round knockout. Pavlov fought the experienced Isaac Sackey for the vacant WBA International super bantamweight title on 12 September 2021. He won the fight by a fourth-round technical knockout. Pavlov was next booked to face Edixon Perez in a non-title bout on 24 December 2021. He won the fight by unanimous decision, with all three judges awarding him an 80-72 scorecard.

Pavlov faced Alexis Salido on 4 June 2022, in his first fight of the year. He won the bout by a second-round technical knockout.

== Professional boxing record ==
9 fights	9 wins	0 losses
By knockout	7	0
By decision	2	0

No.	Result	Record	Opponent	Type	Round, time	Date	Location	Notes
9	Win	9–0	Juan Carlos Mireles	TKO	2 (8)	25 Mar 2023	Gimnasio de Mexicali, Mexicali, Mexico	
8	Win	8–0	Jesus Gomez Quintana	KO	6 (8), 0:10	15 Oct 2022	Casino Hipodromo Agua Caliente, Tijuana, Mexico	
7	Win	7–0	Alexis Salido	TKO	2 (6), 0:55	4 Jun 2022	Armory, Minneapolis, Minnesota, U.S.	
6	Win	6–0	Edixon Perez	UD	8	24 Dec 2021	USC Soviet Wings, Moscow, Russia	
5	Win	5–0	Isaac Sackey	TKO	4 (10), 1:14	12 Sep 2021	Jekpe-Jek Arena, Nur-Sultan, Kazakhstan	Won vacant WBA International super bantamweight title
4	Win	4–0	Nasibu Ramadhani	KO	5 (8), 1:13	20 May 2021	Lokomotiv Arena, Novosibirsk, Russia	
3	Win	3–0	Alie Laurel	UD	6	16 Dec 2020	Jekpe-Jek Arena, Nur-Sultan, Kazakhstan	
2	Win	2–0	Goodluck Mrema	TKO	2 (6), 2:50	31 Oct 2020	Atyrau, Kazakhstan	
1	Win	1–0	Patrik Renato Horvath	KO	2 (6), 2:30	26 Jul 2020	DiaMond, Minsk, Belarus	
