= Mikhail Chopov =

Kazakhstani professional basketball player

No. 16 – BC Astana
- League: Kazakhstan Championship

Personal information
- Born: June 1, 2006 (age 20) Almaty, Kazakhstan
- Listed height: 2.05 m (6 ft 9 in)

Mikhail Chopov (Russian: Чопов Михаил Алексеевич; born 1 June 2006) is a Kazakhstani professional basketball player for BC Astana, a leading club in the Kazakhstan Championship and participant in the VTB United League. He previously played for Champion and TwoSteps, and represented Kazakhstan at the under-18 level.

== Early life and career ==
Chopov was born in Almaty, Kazakhstan. He began playing basketball in his youth and joined the TwoSteps development team in 2020.

== Club career ==
=== TwoSteps (2020–2024) ===
Chopov played for TwoSteps from 2020 to 2024, competing in the national youth leagues.

=== Champion (2024–2025) ===
In 2024, he joined Champion, a professional team in the Higher Basketball League of Kazakhstan.

=== BC Astana (2025–present) ===
In 2025, Chopov signed with BC Astana, the top professional basketball club in Kazakhstan. Astana regularly competes in both the domestic championship and the VTB United League. His transfer to Astana marked a key milestone in his professional development.

His signing with BC Astana was officially reported by Sports24.kz.

== International career ==
Chopov represents Kazakhstan at the U18 level. In July 2024, he helped the team qualify for the FIBA U18 Asia Cup after victories over Kyrgyzstan and Uzbekistan in the Central Asia qualifying tournament.

Chopov contributed 12 points in the win over Uzbekistan. During the tournament in Amman, Jordan, he also made a three-pointer against Japan.

== See also ==
- BC Astana
- Basketball in Kazakhstan
- FIBA U18 Asian Championship
