= Denis Volodin =

Kazakhstani footballer

Personal information
- Full name: Denis Volodin
- Date of birth: 11 July 1982 (age 44)
- Place of birth: Kazakhstan
- Height: 1.88 m (6 ft 2 in)
- Position: Central defender

Senior career*
Years	Team	Apps	(Gls)
2000–2003	MYPA	61	(8)
2001	→ Jazz Pori (loan)	2	(0)
2004	TP-47	8	(0)
2006	Astana	14	(2)
2007	FC Ordabasy	26	(1)
2008	FC Atyrau	9	(0)
2008	FC Shakhter		
2009	FC Astana-1964		
2010	FC Vostok		
2011	FC Atyrau	3	(0)
2012	FC Vostok		
- * Club domestic league appearances and goals

Denis Volodin (born 11 July 1982) is a Kazakhstani professional footballer. He plays as a defender. He once was called up for Kazakhstan national football team, but never made an appearance officially.

== Club career stats ==
Last update: 11 July 2008

Season	Team	Country	League	Level	Apps	Goals
2000	MyPa	Finland	Veikkausliiga	1	1	0
2001	Jazz Pori	Finland	Veikkausliiga	1	2	0
2001	MyPa	Finland	Veikkausliiga	1	10	1
2002	MyPa	Finland	Veikkausliiga	1	28	5
2003	MyPa	Finland	Veikkausliiga	1	22	2
2004	TP-47	Finland	Veikkausliiga	1	8	0
2006	Astana	Kazakhstan	Premier League	1	14	2
2007	Ordabasy	Kazakhstan	Premier League	1	26	1
2008	Atyrau	Kazakhstan	Premier League	1	9	0
2008	Shakhter	Kazakhstan	Premier League	1		

== Honours ==
with Astana

- Kazakhstan League Champion: 2006
