= Yelena Sinitsina =

Kazakhstani speed skater

Personal information
- Nationality: Kazakhstani
- Born: 4 October 1971 (age 53)

Sport
- Sport: Short track speed skating

Yelena Sinitsina (born 4 October 1971) is a Kazakhstani short track speed skater. She competed in two events at the 1994 Winter Olympics.
