= Alexander Byzov =

Kazakhstani ice hockey player

Aleksandr Byzov (born April 29, 1974) is professional ice hockey goalie from Russia. He played for the Kazakhstan men's national ice hockey team in the 2007 Men's World Ice Hockey Championships. In addition to he's competed for several tournaments and events in Kazakhstan and Russia.
