= Vyacheslav Tokarev =

Kazakhstani ice hockey player

- Born: 17 June 1986 (age 38); Almaty, Kazakhstan
- Height: 1.83 m (6 ft 0 in)
- Weight: 87 kg (192 lb; 13 st 10 lb)
- Position: Forward
- Shoots: Left
- KAZ team: Arystan Temirtau
- Playing career: 2004–present

Vyacheslav Tokarev (born 17 June 1986, in Almaty) is a Kazakhstani professional ice hockey player currently playing for Arystan Temirtau in the Kazakhstan Hockey Championship league.
