= Andrey Nevzorov =

Kazakhstani cross-country skier (born 1966)

Personal information
- Native name: Андрей Игоревич Невзоров
- Full name: Andrey Igorevich Nevzorov
- Born: 12 January 1966 (age 60) Pavlodar
- Height: 184 cm (6 ft 0 in)
- Weight: 78 kg (172 lb)

Sport
- Country: Kazakhstan
- Sport: Cross-country skiing
Medal record
Men's cross-country skiing
Representing Kazakhstan
Asian Winter Games
Gold medal – first place	1996 Harbin	4 × 10 km relay
Gold medal – first place	1999 Gangwon	4 × 10 km relay
Gold medal – first place	1999 Gangwon	30 km freestyle
Bronze medal – third place	1999 Gangwon	15 km classical

Andrey Igorevich Nevzorov (Андрей Игоревич Невзоров, born 12 January 1966 in Pavlodar) is a Kazakhstan cross-country skier. He competed at the Winter Olympics in 1994 in Lillehammer, in 1998 in Nagano, and in 2002 in Salt Lake City.
