= Junko Yamakawa =

Japanese alpine skier (born 1975)

Medal record

Women's alpine skiing

Representing Japan

Asian Winter Games
Bronze medal – third place	1996 Harbin	Super-G

Junko Yamakawa (山川 純子, Yamakawa Junko, born 28 March 1975 in Niigata Prefecture) is a Japanese alpine skier. She competed in slalom, giant slalom, and alpine combined at the 1998 Winter Olympics in Nagano.
