= Palchan =

Village in Himachal Pradesh, India

Coordinates: 32.3099139°N 77.17551°E

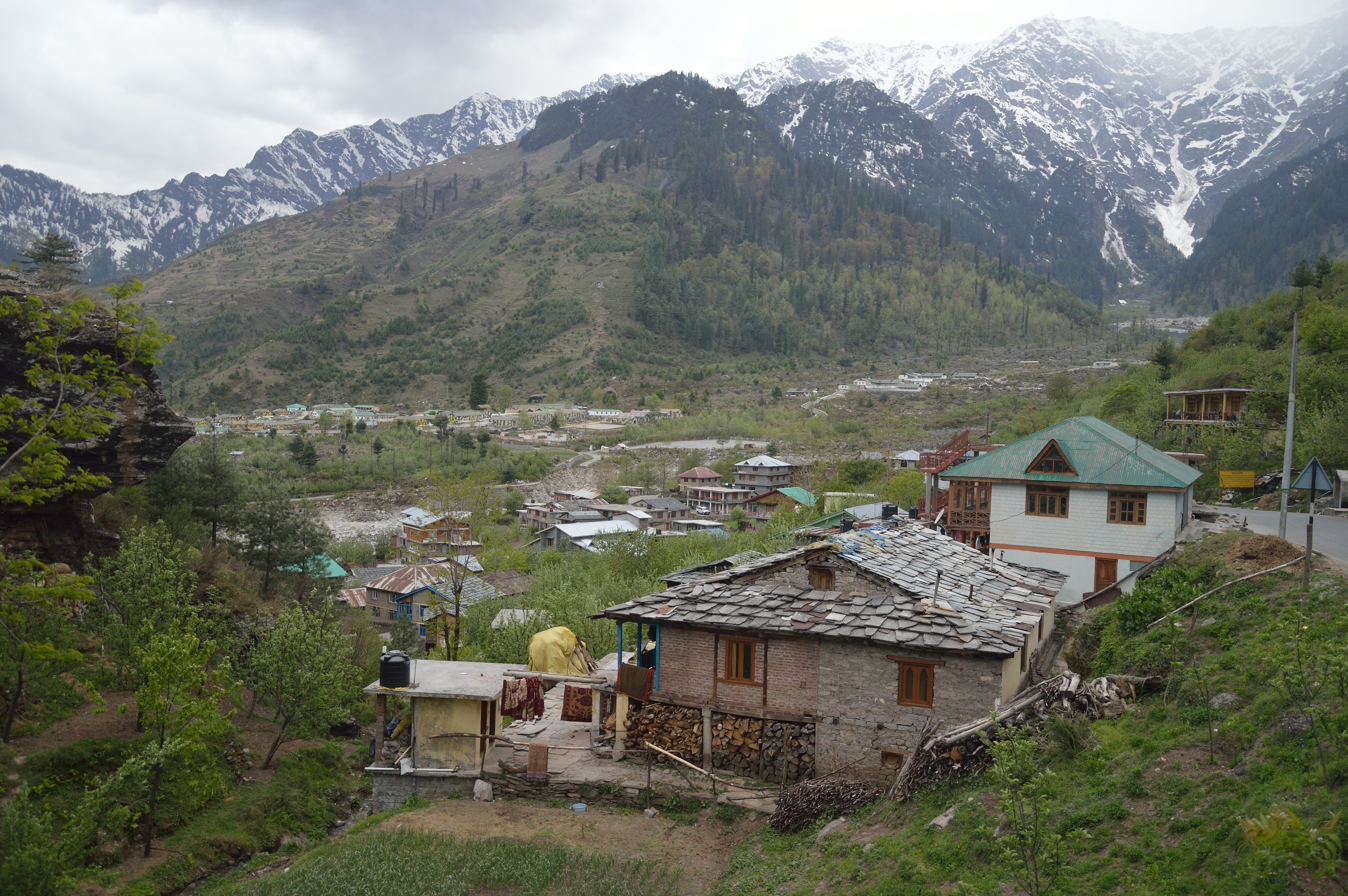
Palchan village

Palchan is a village in the Kullu district in the state of Himachal Pradesh, India. It has a population of 1,241 according to 2011 census. it is close to tourist places of Manali, Solang and Rohtang pass.
