= Denis Shchetkin =

Kazakhstani footballer

Personal information
- Date of birth: September 14, 1982 (age 44)
- Place of birth: Kazakhstan
- Height: 1.85 m (6 ft 1 in)
- Position: Defender

Senior career*
Years	Team	Apps	(Gls)
2000–2001	Irtysh	8	(0)
2002–2003	Ekibastuzets	33	(0)
2004	Esil Bogatyr	8	(0)
2005–2008	Energetic	103	(7)
2009	Irtysh	7	(0)
2010	Kazakhmys	7	(0)
2010	Kaisar	14	(0)
2011	Okzhetpes	20	(0)
2012–2013	Kyzylzhar	61	(8)
2014	Gefest	14	(1)
2015	Kyzyl-Zhar	4	(0)
2016–2018	Altai Semey	0	(0)

International career^{‡}
2003	Kazakhstan	1	(0)
- * Club domestic league appearances and goals as of 27 March 2016 ‡ National team caps and goals as of 19 November 2015

Denis Shchetkin (Russian: Денис Щеткин) (born 14 September 1982) is a Kazakhstan footballer who played as a defender.

== Career ==
Shchetkin began playing professional football with FC Irtysh Pavlodar in 1999, where he won the Kazakhstan Premier League. He scored four goals in 101 Premier League appearances during his career.
