= Igor Zubrilin =

Kazakhstani cross-country skier (born 1976)

Medal record

Men's cross-country skiing

Representing Kazakhstan

Asian Winter Games
Gold medal – first place	1999 Gangwon	4×10 km relay

Igor Zubrilin (Игорь Алексеевич Зубрилин, born March 20, 1976, in Astana) is a Kazakhstani cross-country skier. He competed at the Winter Olympics in 2002 in Salt Lake City, in the 15 km and in the 50 km.
