= Hassan Shemshaki =

Iranian alpine skier (born 1974)

Personal information
- Nationality: Iranian
- Born: 22 May 1974 (age 50); Tehran, Iran

Sport
- Sport: Alpine skiing

Hassan Shemshaki (Persian: حسن شمشکی, born 22 May 1974) is an Iranian alpine skier. He competed in the men's slalom at the 1998 Winter Olympics.
