= Park Byung-joo (skier) =

South Korean cross-country skier

Personal information
- Nationality: South Korean
- Born: 23 April 1979 (age 45); Gunsan, South Korea

Sport
- Sport: Cross-country skiing

Park Byung-joo (born 23 April 1979) is a South Korean cross-country skier. He competed at the 1998 Winter Olympics, the 2002 Winter Olympics and the 2006 Winter Olympics.
