= Park Byung-chul (skier) =

South Korean cross-country skier

Personal information
- Nationality: South Korean
- Born: 9 December 1972 (age 53) Gunsan, Jeollabuk (KOR) South Korea

Sport
- Sport: Cross-country skiing

Park Byung-chul (born 9 December 1972) is a South Korean cross-country skier. He competed at the 1992 Winter Olympics, the 1994 Winter Olympics and the 1998 Winter Olympics.
