= Lee Ki-hyun =

South Korean alpine skier (born 1978)

Personal information
- Nationality: South Korean
- Born: 13 November 1978 (age 46)

Sport
- Sport: Alpine skiing

Lee Ki-hyun (born 13 November 1978) is a South Korean alpine skier. He competed in the men's slalom at the 2002 Winter Olympics.
