= Nanak Chand Thakur =

Indian alpine skier (born 1971)

Personal information
- Born: 20 March 1971 (age 55) Palchan, Kullu, Himachal Pradesh, India

Skiing career
- Sport: Alpine skiing
- Disciplines: Slalom, giant slalom

Olympics
- Teams: 1 – (1992)
- Medals: 0

Nanak Chand Thakur (born 20 March 1971) is an Indian alpine skier. He competed in two events at the 1992 Winter Olympics.

== Alpine skiing results ==
All results are sourced from the International Ski Federation (FIS).

=== Olympic results ===
Year
Year	Age	Slalom	Giant; Slalom	Super-G	Downhill	Combined	Team Event
1992	20	58	82	—	—	—	—
