= Bagher Kalhor =

Iranian alpine skier (born 1979)

Personal information
- Nationality: Iranian
- Born: 23 May 1979 (age 45); Dizin, Iran

Sport
- Sport: Alpine skiing

Bagher Kalhor (born 23 May 1979) is an Iranian alpine skier. He competed in the men's slalom at the 2002 Winter Olympics.
