= Yoo Hye-min =

South Korean alpine skier (born 1981)

Personal information
- Full name: 유혜민
- Nationality: South Korean
- Born: 6 April 1981 (age 43)

Sport
- Sport: Alpine skiing

Yoo Hye-min (born 6 April 1981) is a South Korean alpine skier. She competed in the women's giant slalom at the 2002 Winter Olympics. Yoo went to Cheongju Girls' High School. She won a gold medal in the 1999 Asian Winter Games.
