= George Salameh =

Lebanese alpine skier (born 1976)

Personal information
- Nationality: Lebanese
- Born: 1 January 1976 (age 49); Beirut, Lebanon

Sport
- Sport: Alpine skiing

George Salameh (born 1 January 1976) is a Lebanese alpine skier. He competed in the men's slalom at the 2006 Winter Olympics.
