= Danil Anisimov =

Kazakhstani alpine skier (born 1978)

Personal information
- Nationality: Kazakhstani
- Born: 23 May 1978 (age 47) Oskemen, Soviet Union

Sport
- Sport: Alpine skiing

Danil Anisimov (Данил Михайлович Анисимов, born 23 May 1978) is a Kazakhstani alpine skier. He competed in two events at the 2002 Winter Olympics.
