= Elmira Urumbaeva =

Uzbekistani alpine skier (born 1973)

Personal information
- Nationality: Uzbekistani
- Born: 3 October 1973 (age 51); Bustanlik, Soviet Union

Sport
- Sport: Alpine skiing

Elmira Urumbaeva (born 3 October 1973) is an Uzbekistani alpine skier. She competed in the women's slalom at the 2002 Winter Olympics.
