= Dong Jinzhi =

Chinese skier (born 1977)

Personal information
- Nationality: Chinese
- Born: 7 March 1977 (age 48); Heilongjiang, China

Sport
- Sport: Alpine skiing

Dong Jinzhi (born 7 March 1977) is a Chinese alpine skier. She competed in two events at the 2006 Winter Olympics.
