= Byun Jong-moon =

South Korean alpine skier (born 1975)

Personal information
- Nationality: South Korean
- Born: 30 October 1976 (age 48); Seoul, South Korea

Sport
- Sport: Alpine skiing

Byun Jong-moon (born 30 October 1976) is a South Korean alpine skier. He competed at the 1998 Winter Olympics and the 2002 Winter Olympics.
