= Hur Seung-wook =

South Korean alpine skier (born 1972)

Medal record

Men's alpine skiing

Representing South Korea

Asian Winter Games
Gold medal – first place	1999 Gangwon	Slalom
Gold medal – first place	1999 Gangwon	Super-G
Silver medal – second place	1996 Harbin	Giant slalom
Silver medal – second place	1999 Gangwon	Giant slalom
Bronze medal – third place	1990 Sapporo	Slalom

Hur Seung-Wook (Korean: 허승욱; born 25 April 1972 in Suwon) is a South Korean alpine skier who competed at five consecutive Winter Olympics from 1988 to 2002.

Hur is the second Korean, after shooter Lee Eun-chul, to compete at five Olympics.

== See also ==
- List of athletes with the most appearances at Olympic Games
