= Yuliya Krygina =

Kazakhstani alpine skier (born 1978)

Personal information
- Nationality: Kazakhstani
- Born: 10 February 1978 (age 48)

Sport
- Sport: Alpine skiing

Yuliya Krygina (Юлия Анатольевна Крыгина, born 10 February 1978) is a Kazakhstani alpine skier. She competed in the women's super-G event at the 1998 Winter Olympics.
