= Mona Yongpyong =

Ski resort in South Korea

Coordinates: 37.645°N 128.681°E

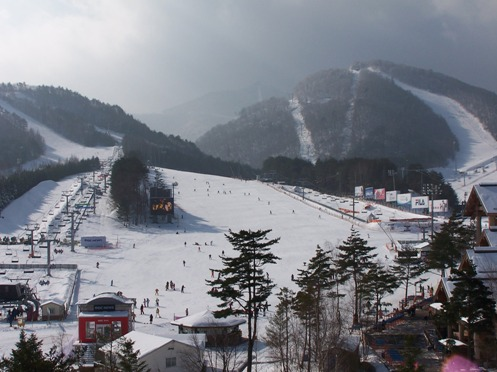

Korean name
- Hangul: 모나 용평
- Hanja: 모나 龍平
- RR: Mona Yongpyeong
- MR: Mona Yongp'yŏng

Location in South Korea

2018 Winter Olympics logo

Mona Yongpyong or Yongpyong Resort is a ski resort in South Korea, located in Daegwallyeong-myeon, Pyeongchang, Gangwon Province. It is the largest ski and snowboard resort in Korea, and offers golf in the summer months.

In 2003, Segye Ilbo, which is owned by the Unification Church, bought Yongpyong Resort.

Yongpyong is currently owned by the Unification Church (the Holy Spirit Association for the Unification of World Christianity), a new religious movement founded by Sun Myung Moon, through the Tongil Group. Yongpyeong-myeon, a nearby township (myeon), is not related to the resort.

The ski season runs from November to early April. It has 31 slopes such as Yellow, Mega Green, Pink, Red, New Red, Blue, Red Paradise, Silver, Silver Paradise, Gold Valley, Gold Fantastic, Gold Paradise, New Gold, Rainbows 1,2,3 and 4, Rainbow Paradise, 15 different lift facilities, including one gondola at a length of 3.7 km (2.3 mi), and Korea's largest ski house (Dragon Plaza).

The elevation at the base area is at approximately 770 metres (2,525 ft) above sea level, and the lift-served summit at Dragon Zone is at 1,458 m (4,783 ft).

== Events ==
Yongpyong Resort has hosted men's World Cup technical events in four seasons (1998, 2000, 2003, 2006) with giant slalom on the Rainbow 1 slope and slalom on Rainbow 3. It was one of the three main sites of the 1999 Asian Winter Games which were hosted by Gangwon. It was the site of the IPC Disabled Alpine World Cup and the 2009 Biathlon World Championships, although the event was marred by lack of snow due to an unseasonable warmth, and criticized for poor spectator attendance.

Yongpyong hosted the technical alpine skiing events for the 2018 Winter Olympics and Paralympics in Pyeongchang. It was also part of the unsuccessful bids for the 2010 and 2014 Winter Olympics (missing out to Vancouver and Sochi, respectively). With a greater vertical drop, Jeongseon Alpine Centre was developed to host the alpine speed events of Downhill, Super-G, and Combined.

The capacity of the venue for these events is 12,000 (4,500 seats / 7,500 standing).

== In media ==
Some scenes of the 2002 Korean Broadcasting System drama Winter Sonata were filmed at the resort.

The resort was also used as a filming location for 2013 Seoul Broadcasting System drama That Winter, the Wind Blows. The filming, during a two nights and three days film shoot at the Resort, was featured in a pictorial in Issue 97 March 2013 edition of fashion magazine, High Cut, with lead actors Jo In-sung and Song Hye-kyo featured on the cover.

It was also featured in the Korean drama Goblin (2016–17) and the Korean drama Sad Love Story (2005).

== Facilities ==
Also contained at Mona Yongpyong is an indoor water park named Yongpyong Water Park.
