= Alidad Saveh-Shemshaki =

Iranian skier (born 1972)

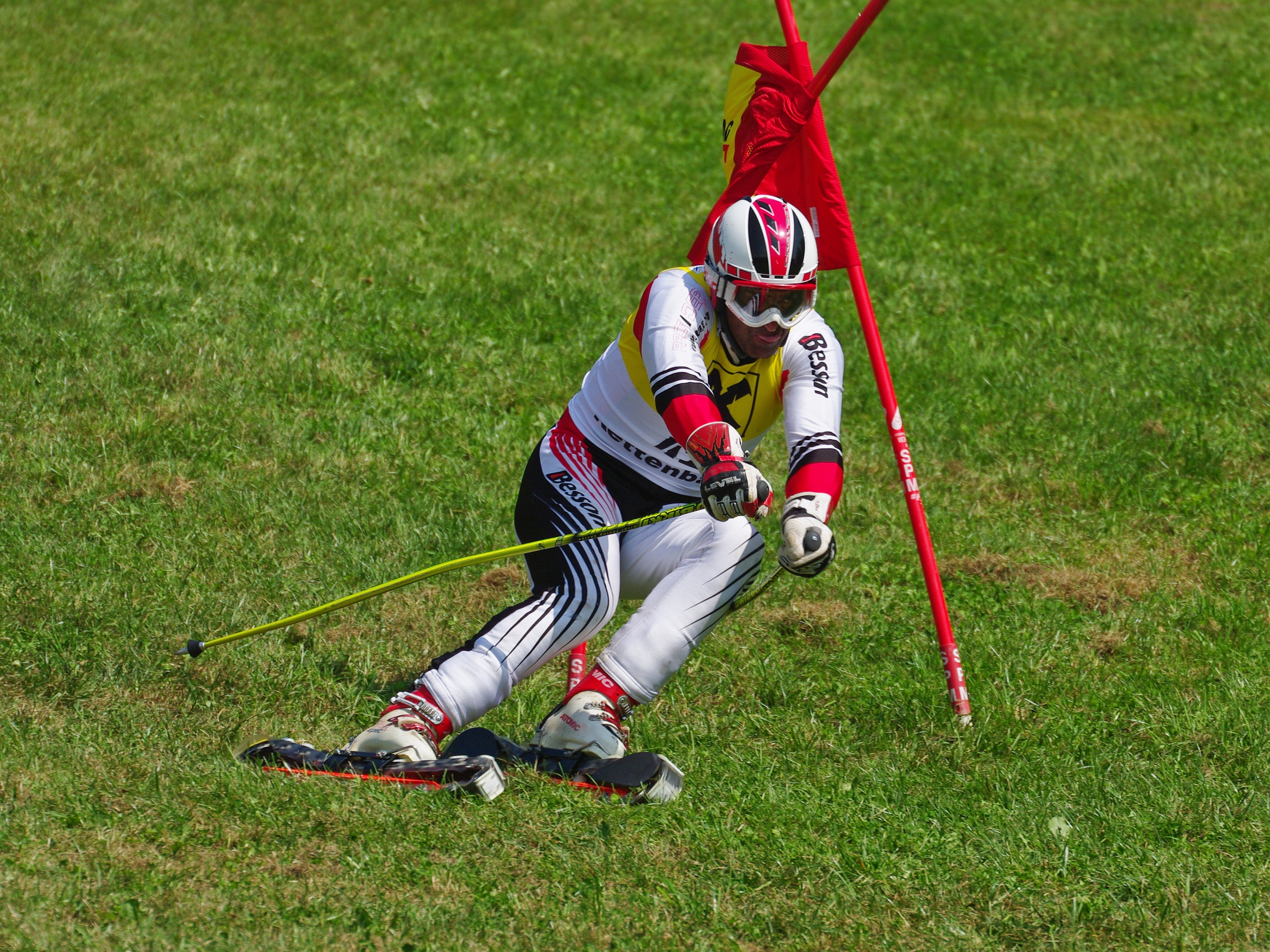
Iranian grass skier Alidad Saveh Shemshaki in the second Giant Slalom run at the 2009 Grass Skiing World Championships in Rettenbach, Austria.

Alidad Saveh-Shemshaki (Persian: علیداد ساوه شمشكی, born 23 July 1972 in Tehran) is a retired alpine skier from Iran. He competed for Iran at the 2006 Winter Olympics. He was also Iran's Flag Bearer at the Games.
