= Olga Vediasheva =

Kazakhstani alpine skier (born 1970)

Personal information
- Nationality: Kazakhstani
- Born: Olga Kurdachenko; 5 November 1970 (age 55)

Sport
- Sport: Alpine skiing

Olga Vediasheva (née Kuradchenko, born 5 November 1970) is a Kazakhstani alpine skier. She competed in three events at the 1994 Winter Olympics.
