= List of flag bearers for Jordan at the Olympics =

Jordan at the Olympics
- IOC code: JOR
- NOC: Jordan Olympic Committee
- Website: www.joc.jo (in English and Arabic)
- Medals: Gold 1 Silver 2 Bronze 1 Total 4

Summer appearances
- 1980; 1984; 1988; 1992; 1996; 2000; 2004; 2008; 2012; 2016; 2020; 2024

This is a list of flag bearers who have represented Jordan at the Olympics.

Flag bearers carry the national flag of their country at the opening ceremony of the Olympic Games.

#	Event year	Season	Flag bearer	Sport
1	1980	Summer	Abdul Latif Abdul Magid	Official
2	1984	Summer	Mourad Barakat	Official
3	1988	Summer	Muneir Al-Masri	Wrestling
4	1992	Summer	Tawfeiq Nwaiser	Taekwondo
5	1996	Summer	Walid Al-Awazem	Judo
6	2000	Summer	Princess Haya bint Al Hussein	Equestrian
7	2004	Summer	Khalil Al-Hanahneh	Athletics
8	2008	Summer	Zeina Shaban	Table tennis
9	2012	Summer	Nadin Dawani	Taekwondo
10	2016	Summer	Hussein Ishaish	Boxing
11	2020	Summer	Julyana Al-Sadeq	Taekwondo
11	2020	Summer	Zeyad Ishaish	Boxing
12	2024	Summer	Rama Abo-Alrub	Taekwondo
12	2024	Summer	Saleh Sharabaty	Taekwondo

== See also ==
- Jordan at the Olympics
