= Alpine skiing at the 2007 Asian Winter Games =

- Venue: Beida Lake Skiing Resort
- Dates: 31 January – 3 February 2007
- Competitors: 85 from 18 nations

Alpine skiing at the 2007 Asian Winter Games was held at the Beida Lake Skiing Resort in Changchun, China. Events were held from 31 January to 3 February 2007.

== Schedule ==
| F | Final |

| Event↓/Date → | 31st Wed | 1st Thu | 2nd Fri | 3rd Sat |
|---|---|---|---|---|
| Men's slalom | | | | F |
| Men's giant slalom | | F | | |
| Women's slalom | | | F | |
| Women's giant slalom | F | | | |

== Medalists ==
=== Men ===
| Event | Gold | Silver | Bronze |
|---|---|---|---|
| Slalom | Yasuhiro Ikuta; Japan | Kang Min-heuk; South Korea | Masashi Hanada; Japan |
| Giant slalom | Yasuhiro Ikuta; Japan | Kang Min-heuk; South Korea | Kim Woo-sung; South Korea |

=== Women ===
| Event | Gold | Silver | Bronze |
|---|---|---|---|
| Slalom | Chika Kato; Japan | Moe Hanaoka; Japan | Oh Jae-eun; South Korea |
| Giant slalom | Emiko Kiyosawa; Japan | Oh Jae-eun; South Korea | Kim Sun-joo; South Korea |

== Medal table ==
| Rank | Nation | Gold | Silver | Bronze | Total |
|---|---|---|---|---|---|
| 1 | Japan (JPN) | 4 | 1 | 1 | 6 |
| 2 | South Korea (KOR) | 0 | 3 | 3 | 6 |
| Totals (2 entries) | | 4 | 4 | 4 | 12 |

== Participating nations ==
A total of 85 athletes from 18 nations competed in alpine skiing at the 2007 Asian Winter Games:

- Afghanistan (3)
- China (14)
- Chinese Taipei (1)
- India (3)
- Iran (8)
- Japan (7)
- Jordan (3)
- Kazakhstan (6)
- Kyrgyzstan (1)
- Lebanon (2)
- Mongolia (6)
- Nepal (1)
- North Korea (5)
- Pakistan (6)
- Palestine (1)
- South Korea (7)
- Tajikistan (3)
- Uzbekistan (8)
