= Alpine skiing at the 2007 Asian Winter Games – Men's giant slalom =

Men's giant slalom at the 2007 Asian Winter Games
- Venue: Beida Lake Skiing Resort
- Dates: 1 February 2007
- Competitors: 46 from 16 nations

Medalists
gold medal	Yasuhiro Ikuta	Japan
silver medal	Kang Min-heuk	South Korea
bronze medal	Kim Woo-sung	South Korea

The men's giant slalom at the 2007 Asian Winter Games was held on 1 February 2007 at Beida Lake Skiing Resort, China.

== Schedule ==
All times are China Standard Time (UTC+08:00)

Date	Time	Event
Thursday, 1 February 2007	10:00	1st run
Thursday, 1 February 2007	10:00	2nd run

== Results ==
Legend

- DNF — Did not finish
- DNS — Did not start

Rank	Athlete	1st run	2nd run	Total
1st place, gold medalist(s)	Yasuhiro Ikuta (JPN)	1:04.70	1:04.64	2:09.34
2nd place, silver medalist(s)	Kang Min-heuk (KOR)	1:04.89	1:05.04	2:09.93
3rd place, bronze medalist(s)	Kim Woo-sung (KOR)	1:05.81	1:04.98	2:10.79
4	Masaharu Ajiki (JPN)	1:06.64	1:04.97	2:11.61
5	Masashi Hanada (JPN)	1:06.10	1:05.82	2:11.92
6	Takumu Yoshinami (JPN)	1:06.20	1:05.91	2:12.11
7	An Sung-jun (KOR)	1:06.31	1:06.14	2:12.45
8	Kim Min-sung (KOR)	1:07.24	1:06.20	2:13.44
9	Viktor Ryabchenko (KAZ)	1:07.92	1:07.04	2:14.96
10	Pouria Saveh-Shemshaki (IRI)	1:07.94	1:07.49	2:15.43
11	Hossein Saveh-Shemshaki (IRI)	1:08.66	1:07.94	2:16.60
12	Bagher Kalhor (IRI)	1:08.88	1:08.35	2:17.23
13	Alidad Saveh-Shemshaki (IRI)	1:08.77	1:09.14	2:17.91
14	Taras Pimenov (KAZ)	1:09.99	1:08.39	2:18.38
15	Vladimir Ryabchenko (KAZ)	1:10.19	1:09.00	2:19.19
16	Ren Zhipeng (CHN)	1:10.29	1:09.83	2:20.12
17	Cang Song (CHN)	1:10.52	1:09.93	2:20.45
18	Denis Grigorev (UZB)	1:10.68	1:09.90	2:20.58
19	Igor Zakurdayev (KAZ)	1:10.88	1:09.85	2:20.73
20	Oleg Shamaev (UZB)	1:11.45	1:10.12	2:21.57
21	Kayrat Ermetov (UZB)	1:12.68	1:10.45	2:23.13
22	Choe Chang-jun (PRK)	1:15.20	1:15.17	2:30.37
23	Alisher Qudratov (TJK)	1:15.61	1:15.10	2:30.71
24	Muhammad Abbas (PAK)	1:15.30	1:16.16	2:31.46
25	Rachid Khalil (LIB)	1:16.06	1:17.80	2:33.86
26	Ri Myong-ho (PRK)	1:17.61	1:16.72	2:34.33
27	Tara Chand (IND)	1:15.48	1:22.00	2:37.48
28	Ri Chol-jin (PRK)	1:19.12	1:19.34	2:38.46
29	Muhammad Iqbal Shah (PAK)	1:20.67	1:19.16	2:39.83
30	Waseem Abbas (PAK)	1:20.23	1:19.78	2:40.01
31	Pramod Lama (NEP)	1:23.20	1:23.65	2:46.85
32	Jamyang Namgial (IND)	1:24.78	1:23.75	2:48.53
33	Chagnaagiin Aranzalzul (MGL)	1:25.45	1:25.32	2:50.77
34	Mir Nawaz Khan (PAK)	1:27.88	1:26.93	2:54.81
35	Nasrullo Zokirov (TJK)	1:27.45	1:28.95	2:56.40
36	Abdurakhim Kurbonov (TJK)	1:29.00	1:28.02	2:57.02
37	Khaled Badreddin (JOR)	1:28.64	1:29.64	2:58.28
38	Dondogiin Bayaraa (MGL)	1:39.50	1:49.49	3:28.99
39	Mohammed El-Batta (PLE)	1:47.39	1:45.62	3:33.01
—	Zhang Honglei (CHN)	1:13.03	DNF	DNF
—	Nail Shiriazdanov (UZB)	1:13.31	DNF	DNF
—	An Yu-chol (PRK)	1:15.24	DNF	DNF
—	Li Lei (CHN)	DNF		DNF
—	Ivan Borisov (KGZ)	DNS		DNS
—	Chagnaagiin Bayarzul (MGL)	DNS		DNS
—	Raja Badreddin (JOR)	DNS		DNS
