= Alpine skiing at the 2007 Asian Winter Games – Men's slalom =

Men's slalom at the 2007 Asian Winter Games
- Venue: Beida Lake Skiing Resort
- Dates: 3 February 2007
- Competitors: 49 from 17 nations

Medalists
gold medal	Yasuhiro Ikuta	Japan
silver medal	Kang Min-heuk	South Korea
bronze medal	Masashi Hanada	Japan

The men's slalom at the 2007 Asian Winter Games was held on 3 February 2007 at Beida Lake Skiing Resort, China.

== Schedule ==
All times are China Standard Time (UTC+08:00)

Date	Time	Event
Saturday, 3 February 2007	10:00	1st run
Saturday, 3 February 2007	10:00	2nd run

== Results ==
Legend

- DNF — Did not finish
- DNS — Did not start
- DSQ — Disqualified

Rank	Athlete	1st run	2nd run	Total
1st place, gold medalist(s)	Yasuhiro Ikuta (JPN)	53.48	54.44	1:47.92
2nd place, silver medalist(s)	Kang Min-heuk (KOR)	53.62	54.92	1:48.54
3rd place, bronze medalist(s)	Masashi Hanada (JPN)	54.02	54.83	1:48.85
4	Takumu Yoshinami (JPN)	54.83	54.87	1:49.70
5	Masaharu Ajiki (JPN)	54.50	55.92	1:50.42
6	Kim Woo-sung (KOR)	54.95	55.70	1:50.65
7	Kim Min-sung (KOR)	55.41	55.46	1:50.87
8	Viktor Ryabchenko (KAZ)	56.68	57.28	1:53.96
9	Hossein Saveh-Shemshaki (IRI)	57.74	57.24	1:54.98
10	Alidad Saveh-Shemshaki (IRI)	58.26	57.50	1:55.76
11	Bagher Kalhor (IRI)	57.39	58.41	1:55.80
12	Pouria Saveh-Shemshaki (IRI)	58.64	58.73	1:57.37
13	Taras Pimenov (KAZ)	58.78	59.61	1:58.39
14	Li Lei (CHN)	59.75	59.09	1:58.84
15	Oleg Shamaev (UZB)	59.78	1:00.47	2:00.25
16	Nail Shiriazdanov (UZB)	1:00.61	1:00.13	2:00.74
17	Igor Zakurdayev (KAZ)	1:01.77	59.36	2:01.13
18	Zheng Min (CHN)	1:00.51	1:00.97	2:01.48
19	Kayrat Ermetov (UZB)	1:00.10	1:01.47	2:01.57
20	An Sung-jun (KOR)	55.82	1:07.52	2:03.34
21	Ivan Borisov (KGZ)	1:02.50	1:03.60	2:06.10
22	Rachid Khalil (LIB)	1:06.51	1:07.91	2:14.42
23	Choe Chang-jun (PRK)	1:08.87	1:07.39	2:16.26
24	Muhammad Abbas (PAK)	1:09.58	1:09.74	2:19.32
25	An Yu-chol (PRK)	1:11.03	1:10.61	2:21.64
26	Ri Chol-jin (PRK)	1:12.18	1:11.49	2:23.67
27	Muhammad Iqbal Shah (PAK)	1:11.64	1:13.62	2:25.26
28	Ri Myong-ho (PRK)	1:12.17	1:13.19	2:25.36
29	Jamyang Namgial (IND)	1:12.01	1:13.92	2:25.93
30	Waseem Abbas (PAK)	1:17.56	1:19.39	2:36.95
31	Chagnaagiin Aranzalzul (MGL)	1:20.98	1:20.33	2:41.31
32	James Hillier (TPE)	1:21.08	1:20.29	2:41.37
33	Abdurakhim Kurbonov (TJK)	1:22.31	1:21.65	2:43.96
34	Mir Nawaz Khan (PAK)	1:22.05	1:23.34	2:45.39
35	Nasrullo Zokirov (TJK)	1:29.26	1:18.18	2:47.44
36	Chagnaagiin Bayarzul (MGL)	1:28.40	1:29.05	2:57.45
37	Dondogiin Bayaraa (MGL)	1:33.78	1:32.31	3:06.09
—	Tara Chand (IND)	1:10.52	DNF	DNF
—	Otgonbayaryn Ochirbat (MGL)	1:33.88	DSQ	DSQ
—	Liu Peihua (CHN)	DNF		DNF
—	Tian Yuheng (CHN)	DNF		DNF
—	Alisher Qudratov (TJK)	DNF		DNF
—	Denis Grigorev (UZB)	DNF		DNF
—	Vladimir Ryabchenko (KAZ)	DNF		DNF
—	Pramod Lama (NEP)	DNF		DNF
—	Mohammad Khwaja Harun (AFG)	DNF		DNF
—	Mohammad Khwaja Arif (AFG)	DNF		DNF
—	Mohammad Haji Daoud (AFG)	DNF		DNF
—	Mohammed El-Batta (PLE)	DNS		DNS
