= Alpine skiing at the 2007 Asian Winter Games – Women's giant slalom =

Women's giant slalom at the 2007 Asian Winter Games
- Venue: Beida Lake Skiing Resort
- Dates: 31 January 2007
- Competitors: 27 from 12 nations

Medalists
gold medal	Emiko Kiyosawa	Japan
silver medal	Oh Jae-eun	South Korea
bronze medal	Kim Sun-joo	South Korea

The women's giant slalom at the 2007 Asian Winter Games was held on 31 January 2007 at the Beida Lake Skiing Resort, China.

== Schedule ==
All times are China Standard Time (UTC+08:00)

Date	Time	Event
Wednesday, 31 January 2007	10:00	1st run
Wednesday, 31 January 2007	10:00	2nd run

== Results ==
Legend

- DNF — Did not finish

Rank	Athlete	1st run	2nd run	Total
1st place, gold medalist(s)	Emiko Kiyosawa (JPN)	1:05.20	1:03.72	2:08.92
2nd place, silver medalist(s)	Oh Jae-eun (KOR)	1:05.60	1:04.04	2:09.64
3rd place, bronze medalist(s)	Kim Sun-joo (KOR)	1:06.83	1:04.97	2:11.80
4	Miao Liyan (CHN)	1:07.33	1:05.00	2:12.33
5	Dong Jinzhi (CHN)	1:07.70	1:06.30	2:14.00
6	Kim Ye-seul (KOR)	1:07.69	1:06.51	2:14.20
7	Lyudmila Fedotova (KAZ)	1:08.40	1:07.26	2:15.66
8	Kseniya Grigoreva (UZB)	1:10.13	1:08.33	2:18.46
9	Li Yang (CHN)	1:10.26	1:09.51	2:19.77
10	Elvira Haliulina (UZB)	1:12.11	1:07.77	2:19.88
11	Guliza Gayupova (UZB)	1:13.21	1:10.13	2:23.34
12	Marjan Kalhor (IRI)	1:14.05	1:11.67	2:25.72
13	Andrea Araman (LIB)	1:15.59	1:14.54	2:30.13
14	Samira Zargari (IRI)	1:17.79	1:14.09	2:31.88
15	Madina Rasuleva (UZB)	1:18.74	1:14.51	2:33.25
16	Mitra Kalhor (IRI)	1:20.36	1:14.36	2:34.72
17	Fatemeh Kiadarbandsari (IRI)	1:21.40	1:16.39	2:37.79
18	Preeti Dimri (IND)	1:26.31	1:21.95	2:48.26
19	Galbaataryn Enkhsükh (MGL)	1:34.66	1:30.78	3:05.44
20	Leen Badreddin (JOR)	1:44.94	1:26.43	3:11.37
21	Nadia Hassan Khan (PAK)	1:58.17	1:45.06	3:43.23
—	Yun Ran-hui (PRK)	1:17.04	DNF	DNF
—	Qin Xiyue (CHN)	DNF		DNF
—	Anmaar Habib (PAK)	DNF		DNF
—	Moe Hanaoka (JPN)	DNF		DNF
—	Chika Kato (JPN)	DNF		DNF
—	Vera Yeremenko (KAZ)	DNF		DNF
