= Jordan at the Asian Games =

- IOC code: JOR
- NOC: Jordan Olympic Committee
- Medals Ranked 30th: Gold 7 Silver 24 Bronze 34 Total 65

Summer appearances
- 1986; 1990; 1994; 1998; 2002; 2006; 2010; 2014; 2018; 2022; 2026

Winter appearances
- 2007; 2011; 2017; 2025; 2029

Jordan have competed at all-but-one Asian Games since their first participation in 1986, with the exception of the 1990 edition in Beijing. Jordan has won 53 medals, including five gold, 21 silver and 27 bronze medals. These have been won in seven sports: Taekwondo (27), Karate (13), Jujitsu (five), Boxing (five), Basketball (one), Bodybuilding (one) and Wrestling (one).

== Seoul 1986 ==
Jordan's first participation came at the 10th Asian Games, hosted by the South Korean capital Seoul in 1986. Jordan sent athletes to compete football, basketball, athletics, taekwondo, and archery and succeeded in winning four medals in taekwondo. Three silver medals were won by Ahmed Ali, Tawfiq Nuweiser and Samer Kamal and a bronze was won by Tariq Al-Lababidi. The taekwondo national team ranked third overall, level with Indonesia, in the standings behind South Korea, who won seven gold medals, and Iran, who won two medal including a gold. Overall, Jordan came in 16th out of 22 countries that won medals and fifth out of eight Arab nations that won medals.

== Hiroshima 1994 ==
After missing Beijing 1990, Jordan returned to the 12 edition in the Japanese city of Hiroshima from October 2–16, 1994. Over 7,000 athletes representing 42 National Olympic Committees competed in 34 sports with Jordan taking 13 athletes in five sports: Equestrian, Athletics, Taekwondo, Archery and Karate. The Jordanian delegation won two Taekwondo silver medals through Mohammed Al Zu'bi and Ammar Fahed, with Tawfiq Twaiser becoming the first Jordanian to win at two editions by repeating his Seoul bronze in Hiroshima. Yousef Abu Zaid also received a Taekwondo bronze. Jordan ranked 24th overall on the medal table out of 32 countries that won at least one medal, and fifth in the Arab world.

== Bangkok 1998 ==
Jordan took part in the 13th edition of the Asian Games held in Bangkok from December 6–20, the third time that Thailand has hosted the event after 1966 and 1970. More than 6,000 athletes representing 41 National Olympic Committees competed in 36 sports. Jordan took 38 athletes in 11 sports: Taekwondo, Archery, Bowling, Boxing, Weightlifting, Squash, Judo, Karate, Swimming, Gymnastics and Athletics. Five medals were won with Alaa Kotkot becoming the first Jordanian woman to win a medal, with her Taekwondo silver. There were further Taekwondo silvers for Hussein Al-Tahla and Ibrahim Aqil and a bronze for Mohammed Al-Fararjah. Boxer Mohammed Abu Khadija won Jordan's first non-Taekwondo medal with a bronze. Jordan finished 25th on the medals table out of 32 countries that won at least one medal, and third in the Arab world behind Kuwait and Qatar. China ranked first with 274 medals, including 129 golds.

== Busan 2002 ==
Jordan participated in the 14th edition of the Asian Games which returned in 2002 to South Korea for the second time, in Busan. A total of 7,711 athletes competed from 44 National Olympic Committees. A delegation of 23 athletes competed in 12 sports: Swimming, Gymnastics, Athletics, Taekwondo, Fencing, Table Tennis, Boxing, Weightlifting, Squash, Shooting, Wrestling and Karate. Jordan's haul of two Taekwondo bronze medals represent their lowest won at an Asian Games with only Eyad Saifi and Ali Asmar successful, leaving Jordan 34th on the medals ladder from the 39 countries that won at least one medal.

== Doha 2006 ==
Jordan participated in the 15th edition of the Asian Games held in Doha from December 1–15. The Jordanian delegation consisted of 98 athletes competing in 13 sports including Football, Gymnastics, Athletics, Taekwondo, Basketball, Bodybuilding, Boxing, Weightlifting, Billiards, Equestrian, Wrestling, Chess and Karate. The event also brought Jordan's first gold medal when Mohammed Al Bakhit clinched a Taekwondo title. Seven further medals were won including three silver medals by Yahya Abu Tabikh (Wrestling), Alaa Kett (Taekwondo) and Jamil Al Khafash (Taekwondo). Four bronze medals were won by Amer Abu Afifah (Karate), Talaat Khalil (Karate), Mutasim Billah Kheir (Karate) and Ahmad Al-Saafin (Bodybuilding). The Jordanian team ranked 25th on the medals table out of 38 countries that recorded at least one medal.

== Guangzhou 2010 ==
Manar Shaath created history by becoming the first Jordanian woman to win gold at the Asian Games at the 16th edition in the Chinese city of Guangzhou from November 12–27, 2010. She, and fellow Taekwondo fighter Nabil Talal, won golds out of a total of six medals won by the Kingdom. Dana Haider (Taekwondo) and Bashar Al Najjar (Karate) won silver medals and Nadeen Dawani (Taekwondo) and Mu'tasim Khair (Karate) clinched bronze medals. Jordan was one of the 45 National Olympic Committees to participate with 42 sports held, including 28 Olympic and 14 non-Olympic sports. Jordan sent 86 players to compete in 11 sports: Football, Taekwondo, Boxing, Fencing, Wrestling, Squash, Karate, Basketball, Chess, Kung-Fu and Swimming.

== Incheon 2014 ==
The 17th edition of the Asian Games was held in Incheon, South Korea, from September 19 – October 4, 2014, the third time South Korea has hosted the event after 1986 and 2002. More than 9500 athletes representing 45 National Olympic Committees competed in 36 sports. Jordan sent 97 athletes to play in 12 sports: Boxing, Karate, Taekwondo, Football, Wrestling, Judo, Squash, Basketball, Triathlon, Weightlifting, Wushu and Cycling. Four medals were won with Karate fighter Abdul Rahman winning silver medal the -60 kg weight. Boxer Odai Al-Hindawi took silver the 75 kg event, while fellow boxers, Obadah Al Kissbeh and Ehab Matbouli also won bronze medals. Jordan ranked 31st on the medals table from 37 countries that had won at least one medal.

== Indonesia 2018 ==
The 18th edition of the Asian Games was held in Jakarta and Palembang, Indonesia, from August 18 – September 2, 2018. Jordan sent 35 representatives to compete in Taekwondo, Swimming, 3x3 Basketball, Boxing, Ju-Jitsu, Athletics, Karate and Judo. The event saw Jordan clinch a record haul of 12 medals, including two gold, one silver and nine bronze medals. Taekwondo fighter Juliana Al-Sadiq won Jordan's first gold medal and Ju-Jitsu athlete Haidar Al-Rasheed won the second. Zaid Sami Jarandouqa (Ju-Jitsu) won silver. The nine bronze medals were won by Hamza Qattan (Taekwondo), Saleh El-Sharabaty (Taekwondo), Ahmed Abu Ghaush (Taekwondo), Yara Qaqish (Ju-Jitsu), Fraih Harahsheh (Ju-Jitsu), Abdul-Karim Al-Rasheed (Ju-Jitsu), Abdul Rahman Masatfa (Karate), Bashar Najjar (Karate) and Ziad Ishaish (Boxing). Jordan ranked 23rd on the medals table from 45 countries, and fifth in the Arab world.

== Medal tables ==
=== Medals by Asian Games ===
Games	Gold	Silver	Bronze	Total	Rank
1986	0	3	1	4	16
1990	DNP				
1994	0	2	2	4	24
1998	0	3	2	5	25
2002	0	0	2	2	35
2006	1	3	4	8	25
2010	2	2	2	6	23
2014	0	2	2	4	31
2018	2	1	9	12	23
2022	0	5	4	9	28
2026	2	3	6	11	23
10/20	7	24	34	65	30

=== Medals by Asian Winter Games ===
Games	Gold	Silver	Bronze	Total	Rank
1986 - 2003	DNP				
2007	0	0	0	0	-
2011	0	0	0	0	-
2017	0	0	0	0	-
2025	0	0	0	0	-
4/9	0	0	0	0	-

=== Medals by Asian Para Games ===
Games	Gold	Silver	Bronze	Total	Rank
2010	3	0	2	5	12
2014	1	4	4	9	20
2018	1	2	0	3	24
2022	4	2	1	7	15
2026	2	1	2	5	19
5/5	11	9	9	29	19

=== Medals by Asian Youth Para Games ===
Games	Gold	Silver	Bronze	Total	Rank
2009	7	1	3	11	10
2013	8	4	3	15	12
2017	DNP				
2021	0	2	0	2	20
2025	0	2	0	2	28
4/5	15	9	6	30	18

=== Medals by Asian Indoor and Martial Arts Games ===
Games	Gold	Silver	Bronze	Total	Rank
2005	1	1	4	6	13
2007	0	0	2	2	27
2009	1	4	1	6	21
2009	2	2	8	12	15
2013	0	2	3	5	19
2017	1	2	14	17	24
6/6	5	11	32	48	23

=== Medals by Asian Youth Games ===
Games	Gold	Silver	Bronze	Total	Rank
2009	0	0	0	0	-
2013	0	0	3	3	24
2025	2	2	9	13	20
3/3	2	2	12	16	24

=== Medals by Asian Beach Games ===
Games	Gold	Silver	Bronze	Total	Rank
2008	0	1	0	1	23
2010	0	2	1	3	16
2012	0	0	0	0	-
2018	0	0	1	1	36
2016	4	4	5	13	8
2026	0	0	0	0	-
6/6	4	7	7	18	27

=== Medals by West Asian Games ===
Games	Gold	Silver	Bronze	Total	Rank
1997	2	4	4	10	8
2002	2	1	6	9	6
2005	3	12	10	25	8
3/3	7	17	20	44	7
