= Alpine skiing at the 2007 Asian Winter Games – Women's slalom =

Women's slalom at the 2007 Asian Winter Games
- Venue: Beida Lake Skiing Resort
- Dates: 2 February 2007
- Competitors: 27 from 11 nations

Medalists
gold medal	Chika Kato	Japan
silver medal	Moe Hanaoka	Japan
bronze medal	Oh Jae-eun	South Korea

The women's slalom at the 2007 Asian Winter Games was held on 2 February 2007 at Beida Lake Skiing Resort, China.

== Schedule ==
All times are China Standard Time (UTC+08:00)

Date	Time	Event
Friday, 2 February 2007	10:00	1st run
Friday, 2 February 2007	10:00	2nd run

== Results ==
Legend

- DNF — Did not finish
- DSQ — Disqualified

Rank	Athlete	1st run	2nd run	Total
1st place, gold medalist(s)	Chika Kato (JPN)	42.15	42.68	1:24.83
2nd place, silver medalist(s)	Moe Hanaoka (JPN)	41.90	43.88	1:25.78
3rd place, bronze medalist(s)	Oh Jae-eun (KOR)	43.61	44.16	1:27.77
4	Miao Liyan (CHN)	43.91	44.40	1:28.31
5	Kim Sun-joo (KOR)	44.92	45.25	1:30.17
6	Vera Yeremenko (KAZ)	45.04	46.42	1:31.46
7	Liu Rui (CHN)	45.95	45.56	1:31.51
8	Xia Lina (CHN)	46.61	45.55	1:32.16
9	Kim Ye-seul (KOR)	46.70	46.04	1:32.74
10	Liu Jing (CHN)	47.13	45.69	1:32.82
11	Kseniya Grigoreva (UZB)	46.48	46.58	1:33.06
12	Andrea Araman (LIB)	52.55	49.03	1:41.58
13	Fatemeh Kiadarbandsari (IRI)	51.66	51.59	1:43.25
14	Samira Zargari (IRI)	52.78	51.38	1:44.16
15	Marjan Kalhor (IRI)	52.83	54.24	1:47.07
16	Madina Rasuleva (UZB)	58.57	57.48	1:56.05
17	Guliza Gayupova (UZB)	1:08.95	49.86	1:58.81
18	Yun Ran-hui (PRK)	1:06.57	56.25	2:02.82
19	Preeti Dimri (IND)	1:02.52	1:02.93	2:05.45
20	Galbaataryn Enkhsükh (MGL)	1:07.62	1:06.35	2:13.97
21	Mitra Kalhor (IRI)	1:23.04	54.14	2:17.18
22	Ünenbatyn Maral (MGL)	1:11.67	1:09.06	2:20.73
—	Lyudmila Fedotova (KAZ)	48.14	DNF	DNF
—	Elvira Haliulina (UZB)	50.88	DNF	DNF
—	Nadia Hassan Khan (PAK)	DNF		DNF
—	Anmaar Habib (PAK)	DSQ		DSQ
—	Emiko Kiyosawa (JPN)	DSQ		DSQ
