= Tajikistan at the Asian Games =

- IOC code: TJK
- NOC: National Olympic Committee of the Republic of Tajikistan
- Medals Ranked 29th: Gold 8 Silver 13 Bronze 30 Total 51

Summer appearances
- 1994; 1998; 2002; 2006; 2010; 2014; 2018; 2022; 2026

Winter appearances
- 1996; 1999; 2003; 2007; 2011; 2017; 2025; 2029

Tajikistan first competed at the Asian Games in 1994.

== Asian Games ==
=== Medals by Games ===
Peach colour indicates best performance

Games	Gold	Silver	Bronze	Total	Rank
(Japan) 1994 Hiroshima	0	0	2	2	29
(Thailand) 1998 Bangkok	0	0	0	0	-
(South Korea) 2002 Busan	0	2	4	6	28
(Qatar) 2006 Doha	2	0	2	4	24
(China) 2010 Guangzhou	1	0	3	4	28
(South Korea) 2014 Incheon	1	1	3	5	23
(Indonesia) 2018 Jakarta	0	4	3	7	30
(China) 2022 Hangzhou	2	1	4	7	24
(Japan) 2026 Aichi	2	5	9	16	22
(Qatar) 2030 Doha	future event				
Total	8	13	30	51	29

=== Medals by sport ===
Leading in that sport

=== Asian Games ===
Sport	Gold	Silver	Bronze	Total
Athletics	3	1	0	4
Boxing	2	0	4	6
Judo	1	1	6	8
Karate	0	0	2	2
Kurash	0	1	2	3
Taekwondo	0	0	4	4
Wrestling	0	3	2	5
Total	6	8	21	35

=== Medals by individual ===
This is a list of multiple Asian Games gold medalists for Tajikistan, listing people who have won more than two gold medals.

Athletes in bold are still active.

Athlete	Sport	Asian Games	Gold	Silver	Bronze	Total
**Dilshod Nazarov**	Athletics	2006–2014	3	0	0	3

== Asian Winter Games ==
=== Medals by Games ===
Games	Gold	Silver	Bronze	Total	Rank
(China) 1996 Harbin	0	0	0	0	-
(South Korea) 1999 Gangwon	did not participate				
(Japan) 2003 Aomori	0	0	0	0	-
(China) 2007 Changchun	0	0	0	0	-
(Kazakhstan) 2011 Astana-Almaty	0	0	0	0	-
(Japan) 2017 Sapporo	0	0	0	0	-
(China) 2025 Harbin	0	0	0	0	-
(Saudi Arabia) 2029 Trojena	future event				
Total	0	0	0	0	0

== See also ==
- Tajikistan at the Olympics
