= Snowboarding at the 2007 Asian Winter Games – Men's halfpipe =

Men's halfpipe at the 2007 Asian Winter Games
- Venue: Beida Lake Skiing Resort
- Dates: 30 January 2007
- Competitors: 18 from 7 nations

Medalists
gold medal	Kazuhiro Kokubo	Japan
silver medal	Shi Wancheng	China
bronze medal	Daisuke Murakami	Japan

The men's snowboard halfpipe competition at the 2007 Asian Winter Games in Changchun, China was held on 30 January at the Beida Lake Skiing Resort.

== Schedule ==
All times are China Standard Time (UTC+08:00)

Date	Time	Event
Tuesday, 30 January 2007	10:00	Qualification run 1
Tuesday, 30 January 2007	10:30	Qualification run 1
Tuesday, 30 January 2007	11:00	Final run 1
Tuesday, 30 January 2007	11:30	Final run 2

== Results ==
Legend

- DNS — Did not start

=== Qualification run 1 ===
Rank	Athlete	Score
1	Kazuhiro Kokubo (JPN)	43.0
2	Zeng Xiaoye (CHN)	38.4
3	Kim Ho-jun (KOR)	38.0
4	Daisuke Murakami (JPN)	30.9
5	Yue Ling (CHN)	30.2
6	Zhang Yiwei (CHN)	26.6
7	Shi Wancheng (CHN)	21.7
8	Han Jin-bae (KOR)	18.8
9	Yoon Jung-min (KOR)	18.5
10	Park Sung-jin (KOR)	14.3
11	Amir Hossein Sharifinia (IRI)	9.6
12	Aleksey Pirogov (KGZ)	6.3
13	Alireza Ghasemzadeh (IRI)	6.0
14	Andrey Vakurin (KGZ)	5.4
15	Akmatali Paisov (KGZ)	5.1
16	James Hillier (TPE)	3.5
17	Vitaly Batyaikin (KGZ)	3.1
—	Dondogiin Bayaraa (MGL)	DNS

=== Qualification run 2 ===
Rank	Athlete	Score
1	Shi Wancheng (CHN)	39.3
2	Han Jin-bae (KOR)	35.3
3	Park Sung-jin (KOR)	35.1
4	Yoon Jung-min (KOR)	32.8
5	Zhang Yiwei (CHN)	21.9
6	Aleksey Pirogov (KGZ)	11.6
7	Amir Hossein Sharifinia (IRI)	11.1
8	Alireza Ghasemzadeh (IRI)	8.6
9	Andrey Vakurin (KGZ)	8.5
10	Vitaly Batyaikin (KGZ)	7.7
11	James Hillier (TPE)	5.3
12	Akmatali Paisov (KGZ)	3.9
—	Dondogiin Bayaraa (MGL)	DNS

=== Final ===
Rank	Athlete	Run 1	Run 2	Best
1st place, gold medalist(s)	Kazuhiro Kokubo (JPN)	44.5	39.6	44.5
2nd place, silver medalist(s)	Shi Wancheng (CHN)	13.8	42.0	42.0
3rd place, bronze medalist(s)	Daisuke Murakami (JPN)	40.7	32.2	40.7
4	Zeng Xiaoye (CHN)	39.0	39.5	39.5
5	Yue Ling (CHN)	37.0	24.4	37.0
6	Park Sung-jin (KOR)	22.8	29.5	29.5
7	Zhang Yiwei (CHN)	23.8	28.2	28.2
8	Kim Ho-jun (KOR)	21.2	14.2	21.2
9	Han Jin-bae (KOR)	16.0	20.1	20.1
10	Yoon Jung-min (KOR)	19.6	9.4	19.6
