= Snowboarding at the 2007 Asian Winter Games =

- Venue: Beida Lake Skiing Resort
- Dates: 29–30 January 2007
- Competitors: 29 from 8 nations

Snowboarding was featured as part of the 2007 Asian Winter Games at the Beida Lake Skiing Resort in Changchun, China. Events were held from 29 January to 30 January 2007. Japan won both gold medals in halfpipe competition, the host nation China won the remaining medals.

== Schedule ==
Q	Qualification	F	Final

Event↓/Date →	29th Mon		30th Tue	
Men's halfpipe			Q	F
Women's halfpipe	Q	F		

== Medalists ==
Event	Gold	Silver	Bronze
Men's halfpipe	Kazuhiro Kokubo; Japan	Shi Wancheng; China	Daisuke Murakami; Japan
Women's halfpipe	Shiho Nakashima; Japan	Soko Yamaoka; Japan	Liu Jiayu; China

== Medal table ==
Rank	Nation	Gold	Silver	Bronze	Total
1	Japan (JPN)	2	1	1	4
2	China (CHN)	0	1	1	2
Totals (2 entries)		2	2	2	6

== Participating nations ==
A total of 29 athletes from 8 nations competed in snowboarding at the 2007 Asian Winter Games:

- China (8)
- Chinese Taipei (1)
- Iran (2)
- Japan (4)
- Kyrgyzstan (4)
- Lebanon (1)
- Mongolia (1)
- South Korea (8)
