= Iran at the 2007 Asian Winter Games =

- IOC code: IRI
- NOC: National Olympic Committee of the Islamic Republic of Iran

in Changchun
- Competitors: 14 in 1 sport
- Flag bearer: Alidad Saveh-Shemshaki
- Medals: Gold 0 Silver 0 Bronze 0 Total 0

Asian Winter Games appearances
- 1990; 1996; 1999; 2003; 2007; 2011; 2017; 2025; 2029

Iran participated in the 2007 Asian Winter Games held in Changchun, China from January 28, 2007 to February 4, 2007.

== Competitors ==
Sport	Men	Women	Total
Alpine skiing	4	4	8
Cross-country skiing	4		4
Snowboarding	2		2
Total	10	4	14

== Results by event ==
=== Skiing ===
==== Alpine ====
Athlete	Event	Run 1		Run 2		Total	
Athlete	Event	Time	Rank	Time	Rank	Time	Rank
Bagher Kalhor	Men's slalom	57.39	10	58.41	11	1:55.80	11
Alidad Saveh-Shemshaki	Men's slalom	58.26	12	57.50	10	1:55.76	10
Hossein Saveh-Shemshaki	Men's slalom	57.74	11	57.24	8	1:54.98	9
Pouria Saveh-Shemshaki	Men's slalom	58.64	13	58.73	12	1:57.37	12
Bagher Kalhor	Men's giant slalom	1:08.88	13	1:08.35	12	2:17.23	12
Alidad Saveh-Shemshaki	Men's giant slalom	1:08.77	12	1:09.14	15	2:17.91	13
Hossein Saveh-Shemshaki	Men's giant slalom	1:08.66	11	1:07.94	11	2:16.60	11
Pouria Saveh-Shemshaki	Men's giant slalom	1:07.94	10	1:07.49	10	2:15.43	10
Marjan Kalhor	Women's slalom	52.83	17	54.24	17	1:47.07	15
Mitra Kalhor	Women's slalom	1:23.04	24	54.14	16	2:17.18	21
Fatemeh Kiadarbandsari	Women's slalom	51.66	14	51.59	15	1:43.25	13
Samira Zargari	Women's slalom	52.78	16	51.38	14	1:44.16	14
Marjan Kalhor	Women's giant slalom	1:14.05	12	1:11.67	12	2:25.72	12
Mitra Kalhor	Women's giant slalom	1:20.36	17	1:14.36	14	2:34.72	16
Fatemeh Kiadarbandsari	Women's giant slalom	1:21.40	18	1:16.39	17	2:37.79	17
Samira Zargari	Women's giant slalom	1:17.79	15	1:14.09	13	2:31.88	14

==== Cross-country ====
Athlete	Event	Qualification		Quarterfinal		Semifinal		Final	Rank
Athlete	Event	Time	Rank	Time	Rank	Time	Rank	Time	Rank
Ahmad Kavian	Men's sprint freestyle	3:15.86	22	Did not advance					22
Mostafa Mirhashemi	Men's sprint freestyle	3:12.81	20	Did not advance					20
Hossein Saveh-Shemshaki	Men's sprint freestyle	3:13.03	21	Did not advance					21
Sattar Seid	Men's sprint freestyle	3:22.60	24	Did not advance					24
Ahmad Kavian	Men's 30 km freestyle	—N/a						DNF	—
Mostafa Mirhashemi	Men's 30 km freestyle	—N/a						1:45:09.0	17
Hossein Saveh-Shemshaki	Men's 30 km freestyle	—N/a						1:52:25.0	19
Sattar Seid; Ahmad Kavian; Hossein Saveh-Shemshaki; Mostafa Mirhashemi	Men's 4 × 10 km relay	—N/a						2:24:22.8	5

==== Snowboarding ====
Athlete	Event	Qualification		Repechage		Final	Rank
Athlete	Event	Score	Rank	Score	Rank	Score	Rank
Alireza Ghasemzadeh	Men's halfpipe	6.0	13	8.6	8	Did not advance	13
Amir Hossein Sharifinia	Men's halfpipe	9.6	11	11.1	7	Did not advance	12
