= Jordan at the 2025 Asian Winter Games =

- Flag of Jordan
- IOC code: JOR
- NOC: Jordan Olympic Committee

in Harbin, China 7 February 2025 – 14 February 2025
- Competitors: 1 in 1 sport
- Flag bearer: Sharif Zawaideh
- Medals: Gold 0 Silver 0 Bronze 0 Total 0

Asian Winter Games appearances
- 2007; 2011; 2017; 2025; 2029

Jordan competed at the 2025 Asian Winter Games in Harbin, China, from February 7 to 14. The Jordanian team consisted of one male alpine skier. As Jordan's only athlete, Sharif Zawaideh was the country's opening ceremony flagbearer.

== Competitors ==
The following table lists the Jordanian delegation per sport and gender.

Sport	Men	Women	Total
Alpine skiing	1	0	1
Total	1	0	1

== Alpine skiing ==
Jordan entered one male alpine skier. Sharif Zawaideh is an American born skier who will represent the country in the slalom competition. Al-Zawaideh would finish the slalom competition in 30th place.

Athlete	Event	Run 1		Run 2		Total	
Athlete	Event	Time	Rank	Time	Rank	Time	Rank
Sharif Zawaideh	Men's slalom	1:01.60	38	59.71	30	2:01.31	30

== See also ==
- Jordan at the 2024 Summer Olympics
