= Jordan at the 1984 Summer Olympics =

- IOC code: JOR
- NOC: Jordan Olympic Committee

in Los Angeles
- Competitors: 13 in 3 sports
- Flag bearer: Mourad Barakat
- Medals: Gold 0 Silver 0 Bronze 0 Total 0

Summer Olympics appearances (overview)
- 1980; 1984; 1988; 1992; 1996; 2000; 2004; 2008; 2012; 2016; 2020; 2024

Jordan competed at the 1984 Summer Olympics in Los Angeles, United States. 13 competitors, 12 men and 1 woman, took part in 12 events in 3 sports.

== Athletics ==
Men's 800 metres

- Muteb Alfawair

- 1:49

Men's 1,500 metres

- Muteb Alfawair

- 3:50

Men's 5,000 metres

- Basil Kilani

- Heat — 15:20.58 (→ did not advance)

Men's 10,000 metres

- Basil Kilani

- Heat — 30:43.54 (→ did not advance, 37th place)

Men's Marathon

- Ismail Mahmoud

- Final — 2:33:30 (→ 64th place)

Men's 20 km Walk

- Amjad Tawalbeh

- Final — 1:49:35 (→ 38th and last place)

Women's 3.000 metres

- Raida Abdallah

- Heat — 10.48.00 (→ did not advance, 28th place)

== Fencing ==
One male fencer represented Jordan in 1984.

Men's foil

- Ayman Jumean

== Shooting ==
Open

Athlete	Event	Final	
Athlete	Event	Score	Rank
Irfan Adelbi	Trap	149	65
Ayser Al-Hyari	Trap	164	60
Khayri Amar	Skeet	180	49
Ali Hamed Al-Awasa	50 metre rifle prone	581	52
Mohamed Al-Shushe	50 metre rifle prone	577	61
Mohamed Jbour	50 metre rifle three positions	1122	36
Hussam Abdul Rahman	50 metre rifle three positions	1095	47
