= Basil Kilani =

Jordanian long-distance runner

Personal information
- Native name: باسل كيلاني
- Full name: Basil Kilani
- Nationality: Jordanian
- Born: 6 August 1960 (age 65)

Sport
- Sport: Long-distance running
- Event: 5000 metres

Basil Kilani (Arabic: باسل كيلاني; born 6 August 1960) is a Jordanian long-distance runner. Kilani would compete at the 1984 Summer Olympics in Los Angeles, United States, representing Jordan in two athletics events. He would be one of the first athletes to represent the nation in the sport at a Summer Games.

He competed in the men's 5000 metres and 10,000 metres and would place thirteenth in both of the events' heats. He would not advance to the finals of either event.

== Biography ==
Basil Kilani was born on 6 August 1960. Kilani would compete for Jordan at the 1984 Summer Olympics in Los Angeles, United States, representing the nation in two athletics events. He would be one of the first Jordanian athletes to compete in athletics at an Olympic Games.

He would first compete in the heats of the men's 10,000 metres on 3 August against fourteen other competitors. He would finish with a time of 30:43.54, setting a new personal best in the event, and placed thirteenth in his round. He would not advance to the finals of the event.

Kilani would then compete in his second event, the heats of the men's 5000 metres on 8 August against fourteen other competitors. He would finish with a time of 15:20.58 and again placed thirteenth in his round. He would not advance to the finals of the event. Even though Kilani was the next-to-last finisher in the heats of the event, it was observed that attendees cheered him and the other slower runners on more than the winners. In the same year, he would set a personal best in the men's 5000 metres with a time of 15:06.68.
