= Jordan at the 2008 Summer Olympics =

- IOC code: JOR
- NOC: Jordan Olympic Committee
- Website: www.joc.jo (in English and Arabic)

in Beijing
- Competitors: 7 in 5 sports
- Flag bearers: Zeina Shaban (opening); Nadin Dawani (closing)
- Medals: Gold 0 Silver 0 Bronze 0 Total 0

Summer Olympics appearances (overview)
- 1980; 1984; 1988; 1992; 1996; 2000; 2004; 2008; 2012; 2016; 2020; 2024

Jordan was represented at the 2008 Summer Olympics in Beijing, China by the Jordan Olympic Committee.

A total of seven athletes, comprising three men and four women, competed in five disciplines: athletics, equestrian, swimming, table tennis, and taekwondo.

== Competitors ==
In total, seven athletes represented Jordan at the 2008 Summer Olympics in Beijing, China across five different sports.

| Sport | Men | Women | Total |
|---|---|---|---|
| Athletics | 1 | 1 | 2 |
| Equestrian | 1 | 0 | 1 |
| Swimming | 1 | 1 | 2 |
| Table tennis | 0 | 1 | 1 |
| Taekwondo | 0 | 1 | 1 |
| Total | 3 | 4 | 7 |

== Athletics ==
In total, twp Jordanian athletes participated in the athletics events – Khalil Al-Hanahneh in the men's 200 m and Baraah Awadallah in the women's 800 m.

The heats for the men's 200 m took place on 16 August 2008. Al-Hanahneh finished seventh in his heat in a time of 21.55 seconds and he did not advance to the quarter-finals.

| Athlete | Event | Heat | | Quarterfinal | | Semifinal | | Final | |
| Athlete | Event | Result | Rank | Result | Rank | Result | Rank | Result | Rank |
|---|---|---|---|---|---|---|---|---|---|
| Khalil Al-Hanahneh | 200 m | 21.55 SB | 7 | Did not advance | | | | | |

The heats for the women's 800 m took place on 15 August 2008. Awadallah finished seventh in her heat in a time of two minutes 18.41 seconds and she did not advance to the semi-finals.

| Athlete | Event | Heat | | Semifinal | | Final | |
| Athlete | Event | Result | Rank | Result | Rank | Result | Rank |
|---|---|---|---|---|---|---|---|
| Baraah Awadallah | 800 m | 2:18.41 SB | 7 | Did not advance | | | |

== Equestrian ==
In total, one Jordanian athlete participated in the equestrian events – Ibrahim Bisharat in the individual jumping.

The qualifying rounds for the individual jumping took place from 15 to 18 August 2008. Bisharat did not advance past the second round of qualifying.

| Athlete | Horse | Event | Qualification | | | | | | | | Final | | | | | Total | |
| Athlete | Horse | Event | Round 1 | | Round 2 | | | Round 3 | | | Round A | | Round B | | | Total | |
| Athlete | Horse | Event | Penalties | Rank | Penalties | Total | Rank | Penalties | Total | Rank | Penalties | Rank | Penalties | Total | Rank | Penalties | Rank |
|---|---|---|---|---|---|---|---|---|---|---|---|---|---|---|---|---|---|
| Ibrahim Bisharat | Sam-Sam | Individual | 19 | 71 | 32 | 41 | =60 | Did not advance | | | | | | | | 41 | =60 |

== Swimming ==
In total, two Jordanian athletes participated in the swimming events – Anas Hamadeh in the men's 50 m freestyle and Razan Taha in the women's 50 m freestyle.

The heats for the men's 50 m freestyle took place on 14 August 2008. Hamadeh finished third in his heat in a time of 24.40 seconds which was ultimately not fast enough to advance to the semi-finals.

| Athlete | Event | Heat | | Semifinal | | Final | |
| Athlete | Event | Time | Rank | Time | Rank | Time | Rank |
|---|---|---|---|---|---|---|---|
| Anas Hamadeh | 50 m freestyle | 24.40 | 59 | Did not advance | | | |

The heats for the women's 50 m freestyle took place on 15 August 2008. Taha finished fourth in her heat in a time of 27.82 seconds which was ultimately not fast enough to advance to the semi-finals.

| Athlete | Event | Heat | | Semifinal | | Final | |
| Athlete | Event | Time | Rank | Time | Rank | Time | Rank |
|---|---|---|---|---|---|---|---|
| Razan Taha | 50 m freestyle | 27.82 | 56 | Did not advance | | | |

== Table tennis ==
In total, one Jordanian athlete participated in the table tennis events – Zeina Shaban in the women's singles.

The first round of the women's singles took place on 18 August 2008. Shaban lost 11–3 11–6 11–8 11–5 to Dana Hadačová of Czech Republic.

| Athlete | Event | Preliminary round | Round 1 | Round 2 | Round 3 | Round 4 | Quarterfinals | Semifinals | Final / BM | |
| Athlete | Event | Opposition Result | Opposition Result | Opposition Result | Opposition Result | Opposition Result | Opposition Result | Opposition Result | Opposition Result | Rank |
|---|---|---|---|---|---|---|---|---|---|---|
| Zeina Shaban | Women's singles | Hadačová (CZE); L 0–4 | Did not advance | | | | | | | |

== Taekwondo ==
In total, one Jordanian athlete participated in the taekwondo events – Nadin Dawani in the women's +67 kg category.

The women's +67 kg category took place on 23 August 2008. In the first round, Dawani lost to Sarah Stevenson of Great Britain.

| Athlete | Event | Round of 16 | Quarterfinals | Semifinals | Repechage | Bronze Medal | Final | |
| Athlete | Event | Opposition Result | Opposition Result | Opposition Result | Opposition Result | Opposition Result | Opposition Result | Rank |
|---|---|---|---|---|---|---|---|---|
| Nadin Dawani | Women's +67 kg | Stevenson (GBR); L 2–3 | Did not advance | | | | | |
