= Jordan at the 2004 Summer Olympics =

- IOC code: JOR
- NOC: Jordan Olympic Committee
- Website: www.joc.jo (in English and Arabic)

in Athens
- Competitors: 8 in 5 sports
- Flag bearer: Khalil Al Hanahneh
- Medals: Gold 0 Silver 0 Bronze 0 Total 0

Summer Olympics appearances (overview)
- 1980; 1984; 1988; 1992; 1996; 2000; 2004; 2008; 2012; 2016; 2020; 2024

Jordan competed at the 2004 Summer Olympics in Athens, Greece, from 13 to 29 August 2004.

== Athletics ==
Jordanian athletes have so far achieved qualifying standards in the following athletics events (up to a maximum of 3 athletes in each event at the 'A' Standard, and 1 at the 'B' Standard).

Key

- Note–Ranks given for track events are within the athlete's heat only
- Q = Qualified for the next round
- q = Qualified for the next round as a fastest loser or, in field events, by position without achieving the qualifying target
- NR = National record
- N/A = Round not applicable for the event
- Bye = Athlete not required to compete in round

Men

| Athlete | Event | Heat | | Quarterfinal | | Semifinal | | Final | |
| Athlete | Event | Result | Rank | Result | Rank | Result | Rank | Result | Rank |
|---|---|---|---|---|---|---|---|---|---|
| Khalil Al-Hanahneh | 100 m | 10.76 | 6 | did not advance | | | | | |

Women

| Athlete | Event | Heat | | Quarterfinal | | Semifinal | | Final | |
| Athlete | Event | Result | Rank | Result | Rank | Result | Rank | Result | Rank |
|---|---|---|---|---|---|---|---|---|---|
| Basma Al-Eshosh | 100 m | 12.09 NR | 5 | did not advance | | | | | |

== Equestrian ==
=== Show jumping ===
| Athlete | Horse | Event | Qualification | | | | | | | | Final | | | | | Total | |
| Athlete | Horse | Event | Round 1 | | Round 2 | | | Round 3 | | | Round A | | Round B | | | Total | |
| Athlete | Horse | Event | Penalties | Rank | Penalties | Total | Rank | Penalties | Total | Rank | Penalties | Rank | Penalties | Total | Rank | Penalties | Rank |
|---|---|---|---|---|---|---|---|---|---|---|---|---|---|---|---|---|---|
| Ibrahim Bisharat | Qwinto | Individual | 13 | =63 | 9 | 22 | 51 Q | 20 | 42 | 55 | did not advance | | | | | | |

== Swimming ==
Men

| Athlete | Event | Heat | | Semifinal | | Final | |
| Athlete | Event | Result | Rank | Result | Rank | Result | Rank |
|---|---|---|---|---|---|---|---|
| Omar Abu Fares | 100 m backstroke | 1:02.36 | 44 | did not advance | | | |

Women

| Athlete | Event | Heat | | Semifinal | | Final | |
| Athlete | Event | Result | Rank | Result | Rank | Result | Rank |
|---|---|---|---|---|---|---|---|
| Samar Nassar | 50 m freestyle | 30.83 | 62 | did not advance | | | |

== Table tennis ==
Jordan has qualified one table tennis player in the women's singles through a tripartite invitation.

| Athlete | Event | Round 1 | Round 2 | Round 3 | Round 4 | Quarterfinals | Semifinals | Final / BM | |
| Athlete | Event | Opposition Result | Opposition Result | Opposition Result | Opposition Result | Opposition Result | Opposition Result | Opposition Result | Rank |
|---|---|---|---|---|---|---|---|---|---|
| Zeina Shaban | Women's singles | Medina (HON); W 4–3 | Zamfir (ROM); L 1–4 | did not advance | | | | | |

== Taekwondo ==
Jordan has qualified two taekwondo jin for the following events.

| Athlete | Event | Round of 16 | Quarterfinals | Semifinals | Repechage 1 | Repechage 2 | Final / BM | |
| Athlete | Event | Opposition Result | Opposition Result | Opposition Result | Opposition Result | Opposition Result | Opposition Result | Rank |
|---|---|---|---|---|---|---|---|---|
| Ibrahim Kamal | Men's +80 kg | Asidah (DEN); W 9–6 | Nguyen (VIE); W 9–7 | Nikolaidis (GRE); L 3–6 | Bye | Sagindykov (KAZ); W 2–2 SUP | Gentil (FRA); L 2–6 | 4 |
| Nadin Dawani | Women's +67 kg | Dudu (NGR); W 12–9 | Vezmar (CRO); W 5–4 | Baverel (FRA); L 3–3 SUP | Bye | Carmona (VEN); L 8–11 | Did not advance | 5 |

== See also ==
- Jordan at the 2002 Asian Games
- Jordan at the 2004 Summer Paralympics
