= Rugby in Jordan =

Rugby union is a minor, but developing sport in Jordan.

== Governing body ==
Jordanian rugby is administered by Jordan Rugby, which has been recognized by the Jordan Olympic Committee since 2007.

== History ==
Rugby was first introduced into Jordan by the British. Since then, it has mainly been played by expatriates from the British Commonwealth and foreign workers.

Jordan maintains a close relationship with AGRFU, and their development team includes Ghaith Jalajel, a Jordanian.

The Dubai Sevens has also helped stir up some interest in the sport in Arabic-speaking nations. Jordanian rugby has its own sevens and rugby 15s leagues that consists of Citadel Warriors RFC, Citadel Knights RFC, Nomads RFC, Amman Saracens and Aqaba Sharks.

=== Lowest rugby match ===
Jordan has hosted a rugby match at the lowest altitude ever recorded – at over 400 metres below sea level on the eastern shore of the Dead Sea on 29 October 1982. This was between a team representing Aqaba and Safi and another representing Amman. The temperature at the time, was in the 90s (fahrenheit).

== National team ==
The Jordan national rugby union team is a third tier rugby playing international side. Jordan played their first test match against Lebanon on 14 May 2010, in Dubai. They competed in and won the inaugural Asian 5 nations division 3 West competition in 2016.

== Rugby clubs in Jordan ==
There are four clubs in Amman:

- Nomads Rugby Club
- Amman Citadel Rugby Club
- Amman Saracens
- Sosruka rugby

Outside Amman:

- Aqaba Sharks
