= Ryabchenko =

Ryabchenko (Ukrainian: Рябченко) is a Ukrainian surname. Notable people with the surname include:

- Stepan Ryabchenko (born 1987), Ukrainian artist
- Tetyana Ryabchenko (born 1989), Ukrainian racing cyclist
- Vasiliy Ryabchenko (born 1954), Ukrainian artist
- Viktor Ryabchenko (born 1982), Kazakhstani alpine skier
