= Afghanistan at the 2025 Asian Winter Games =

- Flag of Afghanistan (Note: Afghanistan still competes under the tricolor flag used by the Islamic Republic and not the white banner preferred by the Taliban.)
- IOC code: AFG
- NOC: National Olympic Committee of the Islamic Republic of Afghanistan

in Harbin, China 7 February 2025 – 14 February 2025
- Competitors: 3 in 1 sport
- Flag bearer: Nizaruddin Ali Zada
- Medals: Gold 0 Silver 0 Bronze 0 Total 0

Asian Winter Games appearances
- 2007; 2011; 2017; 2025; 2029

Afghanistan competed at the 2025 Asian Winter Games in Harbin, China, from February 7 to 14. The Afghani team consisted of three male snowboarders. Snowboarder Nizaruddin Ali Zada was the country's opening ceremony flagbearer.

Afghanistan returns to the Asian Winter Games with their last competition being in 2011. Despite the fall of the Islamic Republic and the takeover of the Taliban in 2021, Afghan athletes competed under the old tricolor flag.

== Competitors ==
The following table lists the Afghan delegation per sport and gender.

Sport	Men	Women	Total
Snowboarding	3	0	3
Total	3	0	3

== Snowboarding ==
Afghanistan entered three male snowboarders. Included on the team was Ahmad Habibzi, who fled Afghanistan in 1995 at the age of four due to war and settled in Toronto, Canada. Habibzi had only received his Afghan passport after landing in Harbin. All three members of the team were refugees who fled Afghanistan.

Men

Athlete	Event	Qualification				Final				
Athlete	Event	Run 1	Run 2	Best	Rank	Run 1	Run 2	Run 3	Best	Rank
Nizaruddin Ali Zada	Halfpipe	7.00	7.00	7.00	10	Final cancelled				
Ahmad Habibzi	Halfpipe	5.25	5.25	5.25	11	Final cancelled				
Ahmad Hayat	Halfpipe	4.25	4.25	4.25	12	Final cancelled				
Ahmad Habibzi	Slopestyle	8.50	8.50	8.50	10	Did not advance				
