= Jordan at the 2011 Asian Winter Games =

- IOC code: JOR
- NOC: Jordan Olympic Committee

in Astana and Almaty
- Competitors: 2 in 2 sports
- Officials: 3
- Medals: Gold 0 Silver 0 Bronze 0 Total 0

Asian Winter Games appearances
- 2007; 2011; 2017; 2025; 2029

Jordan participated in the 2011 Asian Winter Games in Almaty and Astana, Kazakhstan from January 30, 2011 to February 6, 2011. The nation sent 2 male athletes. Jordan was scheduled to send 3 athletes, but one withdrew due to injury.

== Alpine skiing ==
Men

- Khaled Badr-El-Din
- Raja Badr-El-Din - Also, freestyle skiing.

== Freestyle skiing ==
- Leen Badr-El-Din
- Raja Badr-El-Din - Also, Alpine skiing.
