= Afghanistan at the 2011 Asian Winter Games =

- IOC code: AFG
- NOC: Afghanistan National Olympic Committee

in Astana and Almaty
- Competitors: 1 in 1 sport
- Medals: Gold 0 Silver 0 Bronze 0 Total 0

Asian Winter Games appearances
- 2007; 2011; 2017; 2025; 2029

Afghanistan participated in the 2011 Asian Winter Games in Almaty and Astana, Kazakhstan from January 30, 2011, to February 6, 2011.

== Cross-country skiing ==
Afghanistan's only athlete competed in one race finishing in seventh (and last) place.

Men

Athlete	Event	Final		
Athlete	Event	Time	Deficit	Rank
Omar Rona	15 km freestyle	1:27:32.9	+38:01.9	7
