= Raida Abdallah Bader =

Jordanian athlete (born 1965)

Personal information
- Native name: Raida Abdallah Bader
- National team: Jordan
- Born: February 22, 1965 (age 60)
- Height: 158 cm (5 ft 2 in) (1984)
- Weight: 49 kg (1984)

Sport
- Country: Jordan
- Sport: Athletics
- Updated on 13 July 2017

Raida Abdallah Bader (Arabic: رائدة عبد الله بدر; born February 22, 1965) is a Jordanian middle distance runner. She represented Jordan in 1984 Summer Olympics in Los Angeles. She was the first woman to represent Jordan at the Olympics.

== Olympic participation ==
Bader was the youngest and the only female participant for Jordan in the 1984 Olympics aged only 19 years and 168 days.

She was eliminated in Heat one of the 3000 metres event.
