= Jordan at the 1992 Summer Olympics =

- IOC code: JOR
- NOC: Jordan Olympic Committee

in Barcelona
- Competitors: 4 in 3 sports
- Flag bearer: Tawfeiq Nwaiser
- Medals: Gold 0 Silver 0 Bronze 0 Total 0

Summer Olympics appearances (overview)
- 1980; 1984; 1988; 1992; 1996; 2000; 2004; 2008; 2012; 2016; 2020; 2024

Jordan competed at the 1992 Summer Olympics in Barcelona, Spain.

== Competitors ==
The following is the list of number of competitors in the Games.

| Sport | Men | Women | Total |
|---|---|---|---|
| Athletics | 2 | 0 | 2 |
| Shooting | 1 | 0 | 1 |
| Table tennis | 0 | 1 | 1 |
| Total | 3 | 1 | 4 |

== Athletics ==
Men's 5.000 metres

- Awwad Al-Hasini

- Heat — 14:55.58 (→ did not advance, 48th place)

Men's 10.000 metres

- Awwad Al-Hasini

- Heat — 30:43.19 (→ did not advance, 47th place)

== Shooting ==
Open

| Athlete | Event | Qualification | | Semifinal | | Final | |
| Athlete | Event | Score | Rank | Score | Rank | Score | Rank |
|---|---|---|---|---|---|---|---|
| Khaled Naghaway | Skeet | (41) DNF | 60 | did not advance | | | |
