= Jordan at the 1988 Summer Olympics =

- IOC code: JOR
- NOC: Jordan Olympic Committee

in Seoul
- Competitors: 7 (5 men, 2 women) in 5 sports
- Flag bearer: Muneir Al-Masri
- Medals: Gold 0 Silver 0 Bronze 0 Total 0

Summer Olympics appearances (overview)
- 1980; 1984; 1988; 1992; 1996; 2000; 2004; 2008; 2012; 2016; 2020; 2024

Jordan competed at the 1988 Summer Olympics in Seoul, South Korea. Seven competitors, five men and two women, took part in nine events in five sports.

== Competitors ==
The following is the list of number of competitors in the Games.

Sport	Men	Women	Total
Archery	0	1	1
Boxing	2	–	2
Fencing	1	0	1
Table tennis	0	1	1
Wrestling	2	–	2
Total	5	2	7

== Archery ==
Women

Athlete	Event	Ranking round		Eighth-final		Quarterfinal		Semifinal		Final	
Athlete	Event	Score	Rank	Score	Rank	Score	Rank	Score	Rank	Score	Rank
Eliana Peridakis	Individual	1055	61	Did not advance							

== Boxing ==
Athlete	Event	Round of 64	Round of 32	Round of 16	Quarterfinals	Semifinals	Final
Athlete	Event	Opposition Result	Opposition Result	Opposition Result	Opposition Result	Opposition Result	Opposition Result
Abidnasir Shabab	Light Welterweight	David Kamau (KEN); L RSCH	Did not advance				

== Fencing ==
Men

Athlete	Event	Preliminary round 1	Preliminary round 2	Preliminary round 3	Round of 32	Round of 16	Quarterfinal	Semifinal	Final
Ali Abuzamia	Épée	0 victories, 4 losses 5th in group,74th overall	Did not advance						

== Table Tennis ==
Women

Athlete	Event	Preliminary round	Round of 16	Quarterfinal	Semifinal	Final
Jaklein Duqom	Singles	0 victories, 5 losses 6th in group	Did not advance			

== Wrestling ==
=== Men's freestyle ===
Athlete	Event	Preliminary round	Standing	Final
Athlete	Event	Opposition Score	Standing	Opposition Score
Jihad Sharif	52 kg	Mitsuru Sato (JPN); L 0:45 Herbert Tutsch (FRG); L 2:16	13th in group 26th overall	Did not advance

=== Men's Greco-Roman ===
Athlete	Event	Preliminary round	Standing	Final
Athlete	Event	Opposition Score	Standing	Opposition Score
Muneir Almasri	68 kg	Aria Grigorakis (GRE); L 1-15 Edmu Ichillimpa (PER); L 1-16	6th in group 12th overall	Did not advance
Jihad Sharif	52 kg	Hristo Fliev (BUL); L 0-16 Tobor Jankovics (TCH); L	4th in group 7th overall	Did not advance
