= Kim Ho-jun =

Kim Ho-jun may refer to:

- Kim Ho-jun (footballer)
- Kim Ho-jun (snowboarder)
