= Jordan Rugby =

لجنة الرجبي
- Sport: Rugby union
- World Rugby affiliation: 2020
- Asia affiliation: 2016
- Website: https://jordan.rugby/

The Jordan Rugby Committee is a non-profit organisation with the sole responsibility of developing the sport of rugby in Jordan. It is funded by the Jordan Olympic Committee and is an associate member of World Rugby. Jordan Rugby became an associate member of Asia Rugby in 2008 and then a full member in 2016.

== Rugby clubs in Jordan ==
- Amman Citadel Rugby Club

== Domestic competition ==
In 2016, through developing five teams to compete in the Domestic 15's League, the Jordan Rugby Committee fulfilled Asia Rugby's criteria for full membership Status. Nomads, Citadel and Aqaba Sharks were the first teams to compete in domestic competitions since 2012. The two new teams welcomed to the competition in 2016 were the Amman Saracens and Citadel Warriors.

The Domestic 7's League commenced in July 2016.

== Jordan national team ==
Jordan's captain from 2010 to 2012 was Saleh Fleifel, succeeded by Zaid Arabiat in 2013 and then by Mohammed AlMajed in 2015.

== Youth development ==
=== Get into Rugby ===
Get into Rugby was created by World Rugby as a way of introducing the game to the general public. The programme focuses on non contact rugby or tag rugby, where the players just need to make contact with the belt instead of tackling the opponent to the ground. Other than that the basic principles of the game are the same.

In Jordan, this programme has been adopted by 10 schools across Amman, who all take part in an annual tournament divided into grades of ability. The tournament is then celebrated with a Get Into Rugby Festival Finale where all the school teams compete for a trophy to commemorate a successful campaign. Jordan Rugby has a vision to expand participation into this programme through the Universities.

=== The Rugby Academy of Jordan ===
The Rugby Academy of Jordan is a programme dedicated to fine tuning skill sets for youngsters aspiring to play rugby at a more competitive level. The Academy runs sessions on Friday mornings for the 13 - 17 age group and encourages both boys and girls to participate

=== Amman Camels ===
Amman Camels is a youth programme that focuses on non-contact rugby for boys and girls aged between 4 – 11 years old to get the kids involved in the game.. The sessions are held at the British Club, usually on Friday mornings.

== See also ==
- Rugby in Jordan
