= Rama Abu Al-Rub =

Jordanian taekwondo practitioner (born 2001)

Personal information
- Native name: راما ايمن جميل ابو الرب
- Full name: Rama Ayman Jameel Abo-Alrub
- Born: 8 June 2001 (age 25)
- Home town: Amman, Jordan
- Height: 172 cm (5 ft 8 in)

Sport
- Country: Jordan
- Sport: Taekwondo
- Weight class: +67 kg
Medal record
Women's taekwondo
Representing Jordan
Islamic Solidarity Games
Bronze medal – third place	2021 Konya	73 kg
Bronze medal – third place	2025 Riyadh	+70 kg

Rama Abu Al-Rub (Arabic: راما ايمن جميل ابو الرب, born 8 June 2001)), is a Jordanian taekwondo practitioner. She represented Jordan at the 2024 Summer Olympics and is a two-time bronze medalist at the Islamic Solidarity Games.

== Career ==
In February 2024, she competed at the 2024 Asian Qualification Tournament in Tai'an, China. She won her semifinal match and qualified to represent Jordan at the 2024 Summer Olympics. She was chosen as the flag bearer for Jordan during the opening ceremonies at the Olympics.
