= Jordan at the 2016 Summer Olympics =

- IOC code: JOR
- NOC: Jordan Olympic Committee
- Website: www.joc.jo (in English and Arabic)

in Rio de Janeiro
- Competitors: 8 in 6 sports
- Flag bearer: Hussein Ishaish
- Medals Ranked 54th: Gold 1 Silver 0 Bronze 0 Total 1

Summer Olympics appearances (overview)
- 1980; 1984; 1988; 1992; 1996; 2000; 2004; 2008; 2012; 2016; 2020; 2024

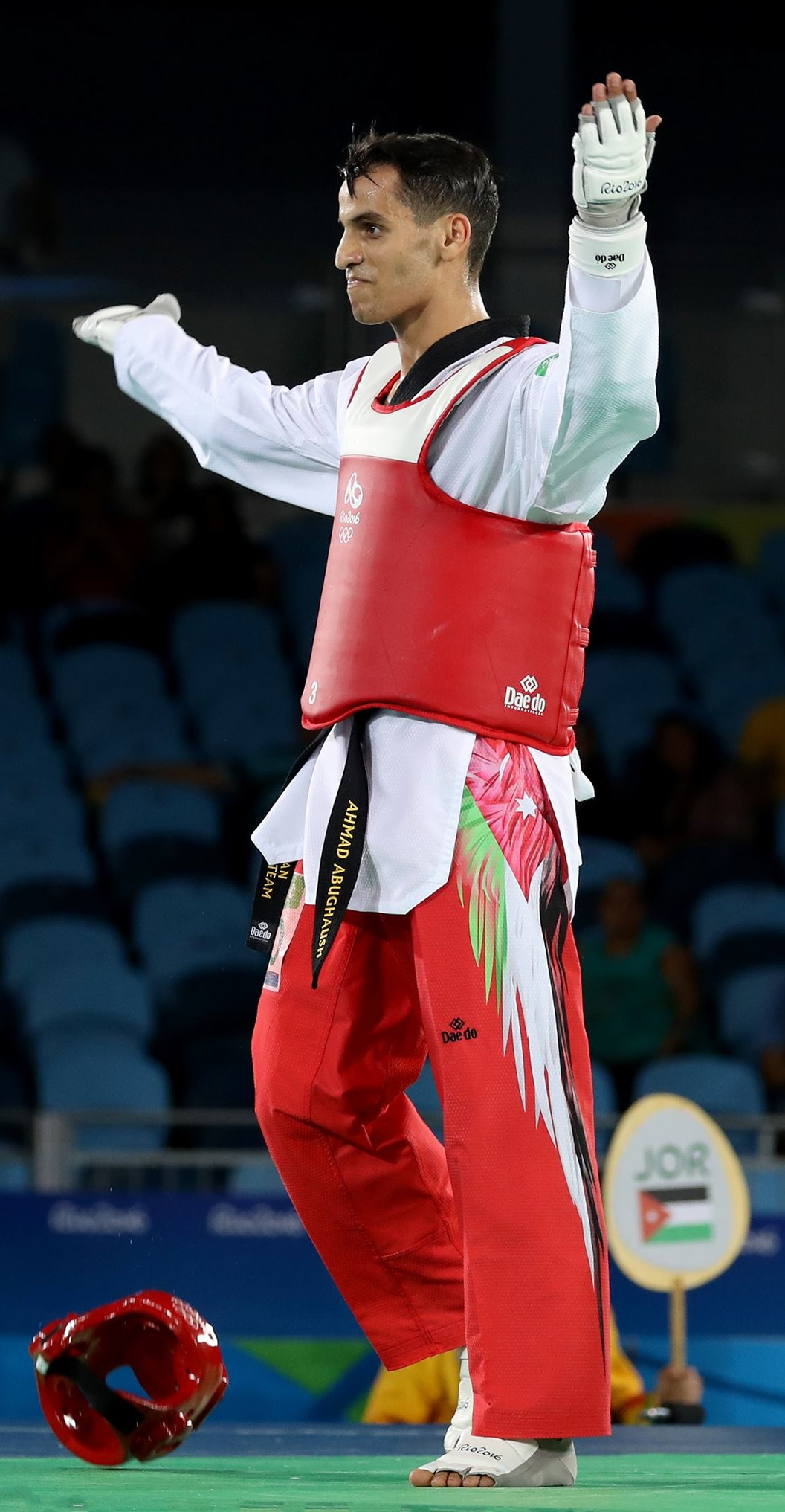
Ahmad Abu-Ghaush won Jordan's first ever Olympic medal, winning gold in the men's 68 kg competition.

Jordan competed at the 2016 Summer Olympics in Rio de Janeiro, Brazil, from 5 to 21 August 2016. This was the nation's tenth consecutive appearance at the Summer Olympics.

The Jordan Olympic Committee selected a team of eight athletes, seven men and one woman, to compete in six sports at the Games. The nation's roster in Rio de Janeiro was also a replication to those sent to Sydney 2000 and Athens 2004, respectively, but had the highest percentage of men in its Olympic history since 1984. Among the sports represented by the athletes, Jordan made its Olympic debut in triathlon.

The Jordanian team featured two returning athletes from London 2012: Methkal Abu Drais in men's marathon, and Talita Baqlah, who became the first swimmer to attend two Olympic Games, along with her younger brother Khader. Meanwhile, super heavyweight boxer Hussein Ishaish was chosen by the committee to carry the Jordanian flag in the opening ceremony.

Jordan left Rio de Janeiro with its first ever Olympic gold medal, which was also its first medal of any color. It was won by taekwondo fighter Ahmad Abu-Ghaush in the men's featherweight category.

== Medallists ==
Medal	Name	Sport	Event	Date
Gold	Ahmad Abu-Ghaush	Taekwondo	Men's 68 kg	18 August

== Athletics ==
Jordanian athletes have so far achieved qualifying standards in the following athletics events (up to a maximum of 3 athletes in each event):

Key

- Note–Ranks given for track events are within the athlete's heat only
- Q = Qualified for the next round
- q = Qualified for the next round as a fastest loser or, in field events, by position without achieving the qualifying target
- NR = National record
- N/A = Round not applicable for the event
- Bye = Athlete not required to compete in round

Track & road events

Athlete	Event	Final	
Athlete	Event	Result	Rank
Methkal Abu Drais	Men's marathon	2:46:18	140

== Boxing ==
Jordan has entered two boxers to compete in each of the following classes into the Olympic boxing tournament. Super heavyweight boxer Hussein Ishaish claimed his Olympic spot with a box-off victory at the 2016 Asia & Oceania Qualification Tournament in Qian'an, China. Meanwhile, Obada Al-Kasbeh received an invitation from the Tripartite Commission to compete in the men's light welterweight division.

Athlete	Event	Round of 32	Round of 16	Quarterfinals	Semifinals	Final	
Athlete	Event	Opposition Result	Opposition Result	Opposition Result	Opposition Result	Opposition Result	Rank
Obada Al-Kasbeh	Men's light welterweight	Biyarslanov (CAN); L 0–3	Did not advance				
Hussein Ishaish	Men's super heavyweight	Bye	Nistor (ROU); W 2–1	Yoka (FRA); L 0–3	Did not advance		

== Judo ==
Jordan has qualified one judoka for the men's middleweight category (90 kg) at the Games, signifying the nation's Olympic debut in the sport. Ibrahim Khalaf earned a continental quota spot from the Asian region, as the highest-ranked Jordanian judoka outside of direct qualifying position in the IJF World Ranking List of May 30, 2016.

Athlete	Event	Round of 64	Round of 32	Round of 16	Quarterfinals	Semifinals	Repechage	Final / BM	
Athlete	Event	Opposition Result	Opposition Result	Opposition Result	Opposition Result	Opposition Result	Opposition Result	Opposition Result	Rank
Ibrahim Khalaf	Men's −90 kg	Briceño (CHI); L 000–011	Did not advance						

== Swimming ==
Jordan has received a Universality invitation from FINA to send two swimmers (one male and one female) to the Olympics.

Athlete	Event	Heat		Semifinal		Final	
Athlete	Event	Time	Rank	Time	Rank	Time	Rank
Khader Baqlah	Men's 200 m freestyle	1:48.42	31	Did not advance			
Talita Baqlah	Women's 50 m freestyle	26.48	51	Did not advance			

== Taekwondo ==
Jordan entered one athlete into the taekwondo competition at the Olympics. Ahmad Abu-Ghaush secured a spot in the men's lightweight category (68 kg) by virtue of his top two finish at the 2016 Asian Qualification Tournament in Manila, Philippines.

Athlete	Event	Round of 16	Quarterfinals	Semifinals	Repechage	Final / BM	
Athlete	Event	Opposition Result	Opposition Result	Opposition Result	Opposition Result	Opposition Result	Rank
Ahmad Abu-Ghaush	Men's −68 kg	Zaki (EGY); W 9–1	Lee D-h (KOR); W 11–8	González (ESP); W 12–7	Bye	Denisenko (RUS); W 10–6	1st place, gold medalist(s)

== Triathlon ==
Jordan has entered one triathlete to compete at the Games, signifying the nation's Olympic debut in the sport. Lawrence Fanous was awarded a tripartite commission invitation for the men's event.

Athlete	Event	Swim (1.5 km)	Trans 1	Bike (40 km)	Trans 2	Run (10 km)	Total Time	Rank
Lawrence Fanous	Men's	18:16	0:48	59:34	0:40	35:47	1:55.05	46
