= Mira Ghniem =

Jordanian swimmer

Mira Ghneim
Personal information
- Native name: ميرا غنيم
- National team: Jordan
- Born: May 18, 1983 (age 41)

Sport
- Country: Jordan
- Sport: Swimming
- Updated on 15 July 2017

Mira Ghniem (Arabic: ميرا غنيم; born May 18, 1983) is a Jordanian Olympic swimmer. She represented Jordan in the 1996 Summer Olympics in Atlanta.

== Olympic participation ==
=== Atlanta 1996 ===
Ghniem was the youngest participant for Jordan in the tournament, aged only 13 years and 68 days then. Till 2017, Ghniem was still the youngest ever participant for Jordan in the Olympics.

Swimming – Women's 200 Metre Individual Medley – Round OneHeat 1
Rank	Swimmer	Time
1.	Olga Bogatyreva (KGZ)	2:26.42
2.	Meritxell Sabaté (AND)	2:37.38
3.	Mira Ghniem (JOR)	2:56.99

She did not qualify round one, and ranked 43rd in the final standing.
