= Jordan at the 2020 Summer Olympics =

- IOC code: JOR
- NOC: Jordan Olympic Committee
- Website: www.joc.jo (in English and Arabic)

in Tokyo, Japan July 23, 2021 – August 8, 2021
- Competitors: 14 in 8 sports
- Flag bearers (opening): Julyana Al-Sadeq; Zeyad Ishaish
- Flag bearer (closing): Abdelrahman Al-Masatfa
- Medals Ranked 74th: Gold 0 Silver 1 Bronze 1 Total 2

Summer Olympics appearances (overview)
- 1980; 1984; 1988; 1992; 1996; 2000; 2004; 2008; 2012; 2016; 2020; 2024

Jordan competed at the 2020 Summer Olympics in Tokyo. Originally scheduled to take place during the summer of 2020, the Games were postponed to 23 July to 8 August 2021, because of the COVID-19 pandemic. It was the nation's 11th consecutive appearance at the Summer Olympics.

== Medalists ==
Medal	Name	Sport	Event	Date
Silver	Saleh El-Sharabaty	Taekwondo	Men's 80 kg	26 July
Bronze	Abdelrahman Al-Masatfa	Karate	Men's 67 kg	5 August

== Competitors ==
The following is a list of the number of Jordanian competitors in the Games.

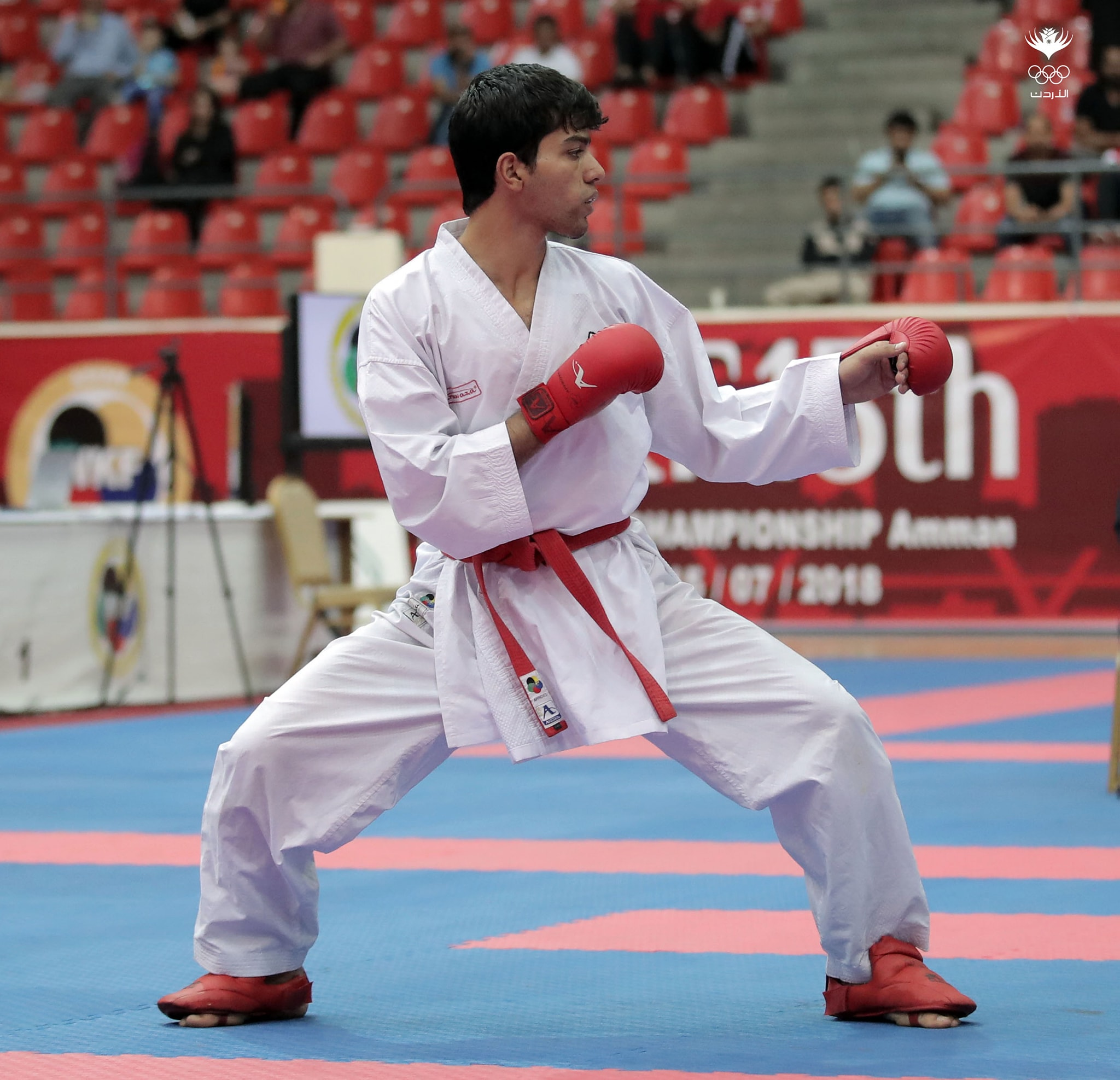
Abdelrahman Al-Masatfa

Sport	Men	Women	Total
Athletics	0	1	1
Boxing	5	0	5
Equestrian	1	0	1
Judo	1	0	1
Karate	1	0	1
Shooting	0	1	1
Taekwondo	1	1	2
Swimming	1	1	2
Total	10	4	14

== Athletics ==
Jordan received a universality slot from the World Athletics to send a female track and field athlete to the Olympics.

Key

- Note–Ranks given for track events are within the athlete's heat only
- Q = Qualified for the next round
- q = Qualified for the next round as a fastest loser or, in field events, by position without achieving the qualifying target
- NR = National record
- N/A = Round not applicable for the event
- Bye = Athlete not required to compete in round

Track & road events

Athlete	Event	Heat		Semifinal		Final	
Athlete	Event	Result	Rank	Result	Rank	Result	Rank
Aliya Boshnak	Women's 400 m	DSQ		Did not advance			

== Boxing ==
Jordan entered five male boxers into the Olympic tournament. Rio 2016 Olympians Obada Al-Kasbeh (men's lightweight), Hussein Ishaish (men's super heavyweight) and his brother Zeyad (men's welterweight), along with two other rookies (Al-Wadi and Al-Hindawi), secured the spots on the Jordanian squad by advancing to the semifinal match of their respective weight divisions at the 2020 Asia & Oceania Qualification Tournament in Amman.

Athlete	Event	Round of 32	Round of 16	Quarterfinals	Semifinals	Final	
Athlete	Event	Opposition Result	Opposition Result	Opposition Result	Opposition Result	Opposition Result	Rank
Mohammad Al-Wadi	Men's featherweight	Ávila (COL); L 0–5	Did not advance				
Obada Al-Kasbeh	Men's lightweight	Asanau (BLR); L 0–5	Did not advance				
Zeyad Ishaish	Men's welterweight	Bye	Clair (MRI); L 2–3	Did not advance			
Odai Al-Hindawi	Men's light heavyweight	Plantić (CRO); L 2–3	Did not advance				
Hussein Ishaish	Men's heavyweight	Bye	Castillo (ECU); W 4–0	Teixeira (BRA); L 1–4	Did not advance		

== Equestrian ==
Jordan entered one jumping rider into the Olympic competition by finishing in the top two, outside the group selection, of the individual FEI Olympic Rankings for Group F (Africa and Middle East), marking the country's recurrence to the sport after an eight-year absence.

=== Jumping ===
Athlete	Horse	Event	Qualification		Final		
Athlete	Horse	Event	Penalties	Rank	Penalties	Time	Rank
Ibrahim Bisharat	Blushing	Individual	Retired		Did not advance		

== Judo ==
Jordan entered one male judoka into the Olympic tournament based on the International Judo Federation Olympics Individual Ranking.

Athlete	Event	Round of 32	Round of 16	Quarterfinals	Semifinals	Repechage	Final / BM	
Athlete	Event	Opposition Result	Opposition Result	Opposition Result	Opposition Result	Opposition Result	Opposition Result	Rank
Younis Eyal Slman	Men's −73 kg	Çiloğlu (TUR); L 00–10	Did not advance					

== Karate ==
Jordan entered one karateka into the inaugural Olympic tournament. Abdelrahman Al-Masatfa qualified directly for the men's kumite 67 kg category by finishing second in the final pool round at the 2021 World Olympic Qualification Tournament in Paris, France.

Athlete	Event	Group stage					Semifinals	Final	
Athlete	Event	Opposition Result	Opposition Result	Opposition Result	Opposition Result	Rank	Opposition Result	Opposition Result	Rank
Abdelrahman Al-Masatfa	Men's −67 kg	Kalniņš (LAT); W 8–3	Da Costa (FRA); W 7–4	Derafshipour (EOR); W 3–0	Madera (VEN); W 4–1	1 Q	Şamdan (TUR); L 0–2	Did not advance	3rd place, bronze medalist(s)

== Shooting ==
Jordan granted an invitation from ISSF to send Asma Abu Rabee in the women's 10 m air pistol to the Olympics, based on her minimum qualifying score (MQS) attained on or before June 6, 2021, marking the country's return to the sport for the first time since Sydney 2000.

Women

Athlete	Event	Qualification		Final	
Athlete	Event	Points	Rank	Points	Rank
Asma Abu Rabee	10 m air pistol	559	44	Did not advance	

== Swimming ==
Jordan received a universality invitation from FINA to send two top-ranked swimmers (one per gender) in their respective individual events to the Olympics, based on the FINA Points System of June 28, 2021.

Athlete	Event	Heat		Semifinal		Final	
Athlete	Event	Time	Rank	Time	Rank	Time	Rank
Amro Al-Wir	Men's 100 m breaststroke	1:02.17	41	Did not advance			
Amro Al-Wir	Men's 200 m breaststroke	2:12.61	26	Did not advance			
Talita Baqlah	Women's 50 m freestyle	26.49	=45	Did not advance			

== Taekwondo ==
Jordan entered two athletes into the taekwondo competition at the Games. Saleh El-Sharabaty (men's 80 kg) and reigning Asian Games champion Julyana Al-Sadeq (women's 67 kg) secured the spots on the Jordanian taekwondo squad with a top two finish each in their respective weight classes at the 2021 Asian Qualification Tournament in Amman.

Athlete	Event	Round of 16	Quarterfinals	Semifinals	Repechage	Final / BM	
Athlete	Event	Opposition Result	Opposition Result	Opposition Result	Opposition Result	Opposition Result	Rank
Saleh El-Sharabaty	Men's −80 kg	Ordemann (NOR); W 5–4	Mahboubi (MAR); W 17–15	Rafalovich (UZB); W 13–11	Bye	Khramtsov (ROC); L 9–20	2nd place, silver medalist(s)
Julyana Al-Sadeq	Women's −67 kg	Titoneli (BRA); L 9–9 SUP	Did not advance				
