= Jordan at the 2017 Asian Winter Games =

- IOC code: JOR
- NOC: Jordan Olympic Committee

in Sapporo and Obihiro February 19–26
- Competitors: 2 in 1 sport
- Flag bearer: Nasser Majali (Opening Ceremony) Volunteer (Closing Ceremony)
- Medals: Gold 0 Silver 0 Bronze 0 Total 0

Asian Winter Games appearances
- 2007; 2011; 2017; 2025; 2029

Jordan competed at the 2017 Asian Winter Games in Sapporo and Obihiro, Japan from February 19 to 26. The country's athletes competed in one sport: alpine skiing. Jordan's team consisted of two athletes (one male and one female).

Nasser Majali, the Jordan Olympic Committee's secretary general was the country's flagbearer during the parade of nations at the opening ceremony, due to both athletes still preparing elsewhere before their competitions began later in the week.

== Background ==
Jordan originally did not enter any athletes at the close of entries in December 2016. However, the country was allowed to enter athletes after the deadline, after the Olympic Council of Asia extended an invite to the two skiers to compete, only a month before the games began.

== Competitors ==
The following table lists the Jordanian delegation per sport and gender.

Sport	Men	Women	Total
Alpine skiing	1	1	2
Total	1	1	2

== Alpine skiing ==
Jordan's alpine skiing team consisted of two athletes, one per gender.

Athlete	Event	Run 1		Run 2		Total	
Athlete	Event	Time	Rank	Time	Rank	Time	Rank
Suhail Azzam	Men's giant slalom	1:48.01	34	1:52.34	30	3:40.35	30
Suhail Azzam	Men's slalom	1:17.44	29	1:21.77	22	2:39.21	22
Sara Sukhtian	Women's giant slalom	2:02.25	25	1:57.16	22	3:59.41	22
