= Jordan at the 1996 Summer Olympics =

- IOC code: JOR
- NOC: Jordan Olympic Committee
- Website: www.joc.jo (in English and Arabic)

in Atlanta
- Competitors: 5 in 3 sports
- Flag bearer: Walid Al-Awazem
- Medals: Gold 0 Silver 0 Bronze 0 Total 0

Summer Olympics appearances (overview)
- 1980; 1984; 1988; 1992; 1996; 2000; 2004; 2008; 2012; 2016; 2020; 2024

Jordan competed at the 1996 Summer Olympics in Atlanta, United States.

== Athletics ==
Women's Shot Put

- Nada Kawar

- Qualification — 15.28m (→ did not advance, 24th place)

== Swimming ==
Men's 400m Freestyle

- Omar Dallal

- Qualification — 4:41.12 (→ did not advance, 34th place)

Women's 200m individual medley

- Mira Ghneim

- Qualification — 2:56.99 (→ did not advance, 43rd place)

== Shooting ==
Men

Athlete	Event	Qualification		Semifinal		Final	
Athlete	Event	Score	Rank	Score	Rank	Score	Rank
Mohamed Al-Qasem	Skeet	112	49	did not advance			
