= Snowboarding at the 2025 Asian Winter Games – Men's halfpipe =

Men's halfpipe at the 2025 Asian Winter Games
- Venue: Yabuli Ski Resort
- Dates: 12–13 February 2025
- Competitors: 12 from 4 nations

Medalists
gold medal	Kim Geon-hui	South Korea
silver medal	Koyata Kikuchihara	Japan
bronze medal	Lee Ji-o	South Korea

The men's halfpipe at the 2025 Asian Winter Games was held on 12 and 13 February 2025 at Yabuli Ski Resort in Harbin, China.

== Schedule ==
All times are China Standard Time (UTC+08:00)

Date	Time	Event
Wednesday, 12 February 2025	12:00	Qualification
Thursday, 13 February 2025	11:20	Final

== Results ==
Legend

- DNI — Did not improve
- DNS — Did not start

=== Qualification ===
Rank	Athlete	Run 1	Run 2	Best
1	Kim Geon-hui (KOR)	78.00	DNI	78.00
2	Koyata Kikuchihara (JPN)	69.75	75.00	75.00
3	Lee Ji-o (KOR)	10.75	69.75	69.75
4	Konosuke Murakami (JPN)	24.50	64.75	64.75
5	Kim Kang-san (KOR)	59.75	DNI	59.75
6	Lee Chae-un (KOR)	43.75	DNI	43.75
7	Gu Ao (CHN)	10.00	36.50	36.50
8	Wang Ziyang (CHN)	20.25	31.00	31.00
9	Shuichiro Shigeno (JPN)	12.50	DNS	12.50
10	Nizaruddin Alizada (AFG)	7.00	8.75	8.75
11	Ahmad Mushtaba Habibzi (AFG)	5.25	DNI	5.25
12	Ahmad Romal Hayat (AFG)	4.25	DNI	4.25

=== Final ===
Rank	Athlete	Run 1	Run 2	Run 3	Best
1st place, gold medalist(s)	Kim Geon-hui (KOR)				
2nd place, silver medalist(s)	Koyata Kikuchihara (JPN)				
3rd place, bronze medalist(s)	Lee Ji-o (KOR)				
4	Konosuke Murakami (JPN)				
5	Kim Kang-san (KOR)				
6	Lee Chae-un (KOR)				
7	Gu Ao (CHN)				
8	Wang Ziyang (CHN)				
9	Shuichiro Shigeno (JPN)				
10	Nizaruddin Alizada (AFG)				
11	Ahmad Mushtaba Habibzi (AFG)				
12	Ahmad Romal Hayat (AFG)				

- The final was cancelled due to weather conditions. Qualification results would be considered as final results.
