= Jordan at the 1980 Summer Olympics =

- IOC code: JOR
- NOC: Jordan Olympic Committee

in Moscow
- Competitors: 4 in 1 sport
- Flag bearer: Abdul Latif Abdul Magid
- Medals: Gold 0 Silver 0 Bronze 0 Total 0

Summer Olympics appearances (overview)
- 1980; 1984; 1988; 1992; 1996; 2000; 2004; 2008; 2012; 2016; 2020; 2024

Jordan competed in the Olympic Games for the first time at the 1980 Summer Olympics in Moscow, USSR.

== Shooting ==
Open

Athlete	Event	Final	
Athlete	Event	Score	Rank
Mohamed Jbour	50 metre rifle prone	579	51
Mohamed Jbour	50 metre rifle three positions	1138	26
Khleif Ayyat	50 metre rifle prone	591	32
Khleif Ayyat	50 metre rifle three positions	1104	32
Mohamed Issa Shahin	Trap	171	31
Nader George Shalhoub	Trap	66	34
