= Jordan at the 2012 Summer Olympics =

- IOC code: JOR
- NOC: Jordan Olympic Committee
- Website: www.joc.jo (in English and Arabic)

in London
- Competitors: 9 in 5 sports
- Flag bearers: Nadin Dawani (opening); Mohammad Abu-Libdeh (closing)
- Medals: Gold 0 Silver 0 Bronze 0 Total 0

Summer Olympics appearances (overview)
- 1980; 1984; 1988; 1992; 1996; 2000; 2004; 2008; 2012; 2016; 2020; 2024

Jordan competed at the 2012 Summer Olympics in London, from 27 July to 12 August 2012. This was the nation's ninth consecutive appearance at the Olympics.

The Jordan Olympic Committee sent the nation's second largest delegation to the Games. A total of 10 athletes, equally shared between men and women, competed in 5 sports. Two Jordanian athletes made their second consecutive appearance at the Olympics: equestrian show jumper Ibrahim Besharat, and taekwondo jin Nadin Dawani, who became the nation's third female flag bearer at the opening ceremony. Former Olympic swimmer Samar Nassar also led the Jordanian team as chef de mission. Jordan, however, has yet to win its first ever Olympic medal.

== Athletics ==
Key

- Note–Ranks given for track events are within the athlete's heat only
- Q = Qualified for the next round
- q = Qualified for the next round as a fastest loser or, in field events, by position without achieving the qualifying target
- NR = National record
- N/A = Round not applicable for the event
- Bye = Athlete not required to compete in round

Men

| Athlete | Event | Final | |
| Athlete | Event | Result | Rank |
|---|---|---|---|
| Methkal Abu Drais | Marathon | 2:21:00 | 56 |

Women

| Athlete | Event | Heat | | Quarterfinal | | Semifinal | | Final | |
| Athlete | Event | Result | Rank | Result | Rank | Result | Rank | Result | Rank |
|---|---|---|---|---|---|---|---|---|---|
| Rima Taha | 100 m | 12.66 | 6 | did not advance | | | | | |

== Boxing ==
Jordan has qualified boxers for the following events.

Men

| Athlete | Event | Round of 32 | Round of 16 | Quarterfinals | Semifinals | Final | |
| Athlete | Event | Opposition Result | Opposition Result | Opposition Result | Opposition Result | Opposition Result | Rank |
|---|---|---|---|---|---|---|---|
| Ihab Al-Matbouli | Light heavyweight | Lawal (NGR); W 19–7 | la Cruz (CUB); L 8–25 | did not advance | | | |

== Equestrian ==
=== Jumping ===
Jordan has qualified an athlete.

| Athlete | Horse | Event | Qualification | | | | | | | | Final | | | | | Total | |
| Athlete | Horse | Event | Round 1 | | Round 2 | | | Round 3 | | | Round A | | Round B | | | Total | |
| Athlete | Horse | Event | Penalties | Rank | Penalties | Total | Rank | Penalties | Total | Rank | Penalties | Rank | Penalties | Total | Rank | Penalties | Rank |
|---|---|---|---|---|---|---|---|---|---|---|---|---|---|---|---|---|---|
| Ibrahim Bisharat | Vrieda | Individual | 12 | =67 | did not advance | | | | | | | | | | | 12 | =67 |

== Swimming ==
Jordan has gained two "Universality places" from the FINA.

Men

| Athlete | Event | Heat | | Semifinal | | Final | |
| Athlete | Event | Time | Rank | Time | Rank | Time | Rank |
|---|---|---|---|---|---|---|---|
| Kareem Ennab | 50 m freestyle | 24.09 | 37 | did not advance | | | |

Women

| Athlete | Event | Heat | | Semifinal | | Final | |
| Athlete | Event | Time | Rank | Time | Rank | Time | Rank |
|---|---|---|---|---|---|---|---|
| Talita Baqlah | 50 m freestyle | 27.45 | 45 | did not advance | | | |

== Taekwondo ==
Jordan has qualified 3 athletes.

| Athlete | Event | Round of 16 | Quarterfinals | Semifinals | Repechage | Bronze Medal | Final | |
| Athlete | Event | Opposition Result | Opposition Result | Opposition Result | Opposition Result | Opposition Result | Opposition Result | Rank |
|---|---|---|---|---|---|---|---|---|
| Mohammad Abu-Libdeh | Men's −68 kg | Muhammad (NGR); W 13–1 | Silva (BRA); L 5–7 | did not advance | | | | |
| Raya Hatahet | Women's −49 kg | Alegría (MEX); L 1–12 | did not advance | | | | | |
| Nadin Dawani | Women's +67 kg | Konieva (UKR); L 13–18 | did not advance | | | | | |
