= Jordan at the 2000 Summer Olympics =

- IOC code: JOR
- NOC: Jordan Olympic Committee
- Website: www.joc.jo (in English and Arabic)

in Sydney
- Competitors: 8 in 6 sports
- Flag bearer: Princess Haya bint Hussein
- Medals: Gold 0 Silver 0 Bronze 0 Total 0

Summer Olympics appearances (overview)
- 1980; 1984; 1988; 1992; 1996; 2000; 2004; 2008; 2012; 2016; 2020; 2024

Jordan competed at the 2000 Summer Olympics in Sydney, Australia.

== Competitors ==
The following is the list of number of competitors in the Games.

Sport	Men	Women	Total
Athletics	1	1	2
Equestrian	0	1	1
Shooting	1	0	1
Swimming	1	1	2
Table tennis	0	1	1
Taekwondo	1	0	0
Total	4	4	8

== Athletics ==
Track and road events

Athlete	Event	Heat		Quarterfinal		Semifinal		Final	
Athlete	Event	Time	Rank	Time	Rank	Time	Rank	Time	Rank
Mohamed Al-Kafraini	Men's 800 m	DQ		—N/a		Did not advance			

Field events

Athlete	Event	Qualification		Final	
Athlete	Event	Result	Rank	Result	Rank
Nada Kawar	Women's shot put	15.67	25	Did not advance	

== Equestrian ==
=== Jumping ===
Athlete	Horse	Event	Qualification								Final				Total	
Athlete	Horse	Event	Round 1		Round 2			Round 3			Round A		Round B		Total	
Athlete	Horse	Event	Penalties	Rank	Penalties	Total	Rank	Penalties	Total	Rank	Penalties	Rank	Penalties	Rank	Penalties	Rank
Princess Haya bint Hussein	Lucilla II	Individual	25.50	68	23.25	48.75	69	60.50	109.25	70	Did not advance					

== Shooting ==
Athlete	Event	Qualification		Final	
Athlete	Event	Score	Rank	Score	Rank
Mufid Allawanseh	Men's 50 m rifle prone	581	50	did not advance	

== Swimming ==
Athlete	Event	Heat		Semifinal		Final	
Athlete	Event	Time	Rank	Time	Rank	Time	Rank
Omar Abu-Fares	Men's 200 m individual medley	2:21.22	56	Did not advance			
Hana Majaj	Women's 200 m butterfly	2:31.78	36	Did not advance			

== Table tennis ==
Athlete	Event	Group stage			Round of 32	Round of 16	Quarterfinals	Semifinals	Final / BM	
Athlete	Event	Opposition Result	Opposition Result	Rank	Opposition Result	Opposition Result	Opposition Result	Opposition Result	Opposition Result	Rank
Tatiana Al-Najar	Women's singles	Kostromina (BLR); L 0–3	Svensson (SWE); L 0–3	3	Did not advance					

== Taekwondo ==
Athlete	Event	Round of 16	Quarterfinals	Semifinals	Repechage Quarterfinals	Repechage Semifinals	Final / BM	
Athlete	Event	Opposition Result	Opposition Result	Opposition Result	Opposition Result	Opposition Result	Opposition Result	Rank
Mohamed Al-Fararjeh	Men's –80 kg	Ebnoutalib (GER); L 2–8	Did not advance		Hansen (AUS); L 4–5	Did not advance		

== Sources ==
- Wallechinsky, David (2004). The Complete Book of the Summer Olympics (Athens 2004 Edition). Toronto, Canada. ISBN 1-894963-32-6.
- International Olympic Committee (2001). The Results. Retrieved 12 November 2005.
- Sydney Organising Committee for the Olympic Games (2001). Official Report of the XXVII Olympiad Volume 1: Preparing for the Games. Retrieved 20 November 2005.
- Sydney Organising Committee for the Olympic Games (2001). Official Report of the XXVII Olympiad Volume 2: Celebrating the Games. Retrieved 20 November 2005.
- Sydney Organising Committee for the Olympic Games (2001). The Results. Retrieved 20 November 2005.
- International Olympic Committee Web Site
