= Tajikistan at the 2025 Asian Winter Games =

- Flag of Tajikistan
- IOC code: TJK
- NOC: National Olympic Committee of the Republic of Tajikistan

in Harbin, China 7 February 2025 – 14 February 2025
- Competitors: 4 in 1 sport
- Flag bearer: Ikromiddin Abdullozoda
- Medals: Gold 0 Silver 0 Bronze 0 Total 0

Asian Winter Games appearances
- 1996; 1999; 2003; 2007; 2011; 2017; 2025; 2029

Tajikistan competed at the 2025 Asian Winter Games in Harbin, China, from February 7 to 14. The Tajikistani delegation consisted of four male alpine skiers. Alpine skier Ikromiddin Abdullozoda was the country's opening ceremony flagbearer. The Tajikistani team finished the competition with no medals.

== Competitors ==
The following table lists the Tajikistani delegation per sport and gender.

Sport	Men	Women	Total
Alpine skiing	4	0	4
Total	4	0	4

== Alpine skiing ==
Tajikistan entered four male alpine skiers.

Men

Athlete	Event	Run 1		Run 2		Total	
Athlete	Event	Time	Rank	Time	Rank	Time	Rank
Ikromiddin Abdullozoda	Slalom	1:09.55	43	1:08.35	37	2:17.90	37
Saidashraf Eshonov	Slalom	1:00.93	36	1:01.95	32	2:02.88	32
Mahmadrajab Kholikov	Slalom	1:03.55	40	1:05.65	35	2:09.20	35
Marufjon Mirali	Slalom	1:01.79	39	1:03.23	34	2:05.02	33

== See also ==
- Tajikistan at the 2024 Summer Olympics
