= Afghanistan at the 2007 Asian Winter Games =

- IOC code: AFG
- NOC: Afghanistan National Olympic Committee

in Changchun
- Competitors: 3
- Medals Ranked 7th: Gold 0 Silver 0 Bronze 0 Total 0

Asian Winter Games appearances
- 2007; 2011; 2017; 2025; 2029

Afghanistan participated in the 2007 Asian Winter Games which was held in Changchun, China from January 28, 2007, to February 4, 2007. This country is represented by 3 athletes competing in the Alpine skiing event.
