= Zeng Xiaoye =

Chinese snowboarder (born 1991)

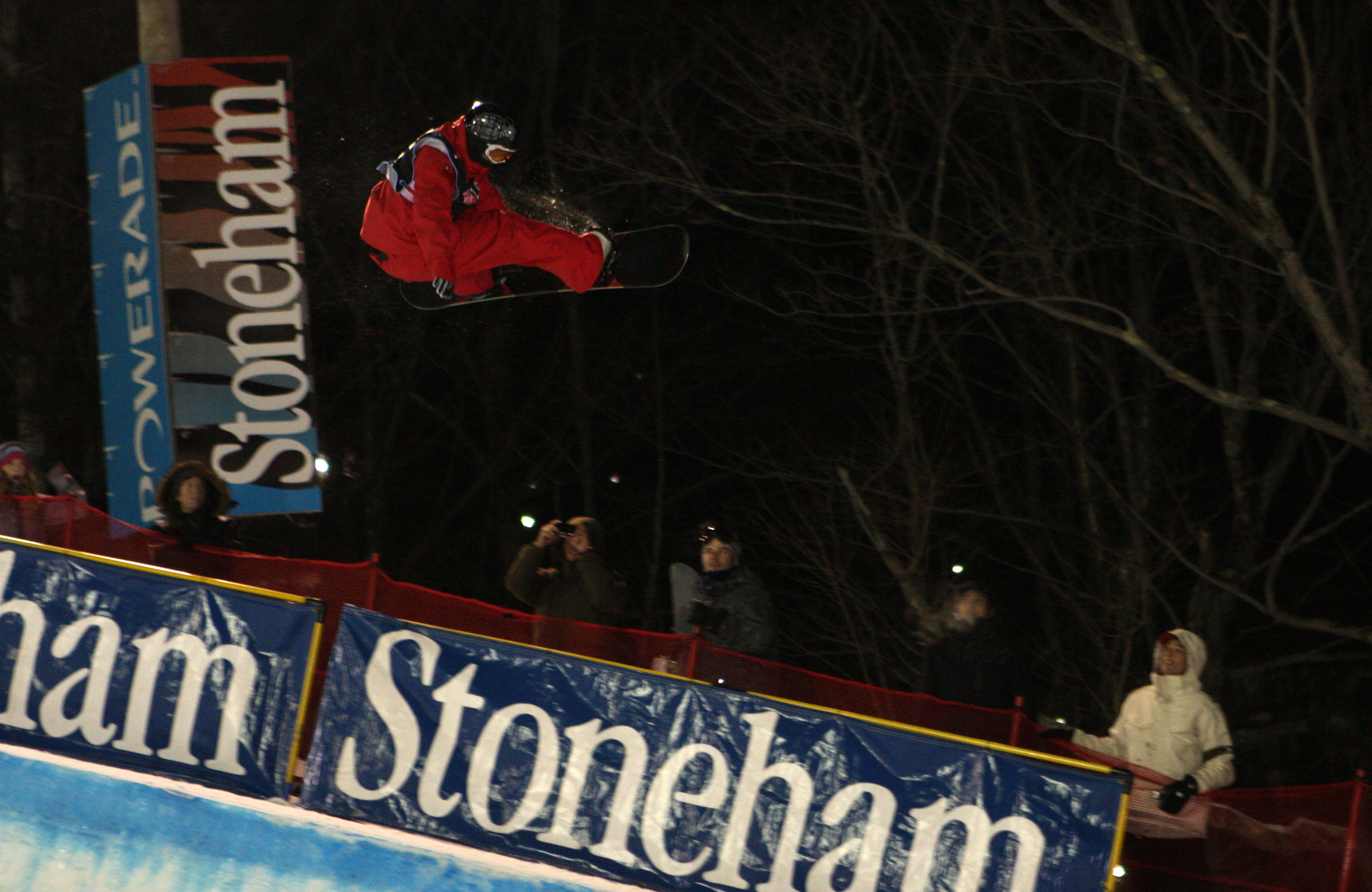

Zeng Xiaoye (Chinese: 曾小烨; born on February 26, 1991, in Wenzhou, China) is a Chinese snowboarder.

== 2010 Winter Olympics ==
He competed at the 2010 Winter Olympics in the Halfpipe.
