= Jordan at the 2024 Summer Olympics =

- IOC code: JOR
- NOC: Jordan Olympic Committee

in Paris, France 26 July 2024 – 11 August 2024
- Competitors: 12 (9 men and 3 women) in 6 sports
- Flag bearers (opening): Saleh El-Sharabaty & Rama Abu Al-Rub
- Flag bearers (closing): Zaid Kareem & Julyana Al-Sadeq
- Medals Ranked 74th: Gold 0 Silver 1 Bronze 0 Total 1

Summer Olympics appearances (overview)
- 1980; 1984; 1988; 1992; 1996; 2000; 2004; 2008; 2012; 2016; 2020; 2024

Jordan competed at the 2024 Summer Olympics in Paris from 26 July to 11 August 2024. It was the nation's 12th consecutive appearance at the Summer Olympics.

== Medalists ==
Medal	Name	Sport	Event	Date
Silver	Zaid Kareem	Taekwondo	Men's 68 kg	8 August

Medals by sport
Sport	1st place, gold medalist(s)	2nd place, silver medalist(s)	3rd place, bronze medalist(s)	Total
Taekwondo	0	1	0	1
Total	0	1	0	1

Medals by gender
Gender	1st place, gold medalist(s)	2nd place, silver medalist(s)	3rd place, bronze medalist(s)	Total
Female	0	0	0	0
Male	0	1	0	1
Mixed	0	0	0	0
Total	0	1	0	1

Medals by date
Date	1st place, gold medalist(s)	2nd place, silver medalist(s)	3rd place, bronze medalist(s)	Total
8 August	0	1	0	1
Total	0	1	0	1

== Competitors ==
The following is a list of the number of Jordanian competitors in the Games.

Sport	Men	Women	Total
Athletics	1	0	1
Boxing	3	0	3
Gymnastics	1	0	1
Swimming	1	1	2
Table tennis	1	0	1
Taekwondo	2	2	4
Total	9	3	12

== Athletics ==
Jordanian track and field athletes qualified for Paris 2024, by receiving the direct universality spots in the following event:

Key

- Note–Ranks given for track events are within the athlete's heat only
- Q = Qualified for the next round
- q = Qualified for the next round as a fastest loser or, in field events, by position without achieving the qualifying target
- NR = National record
- N/A = Round not applicable for the event
- Bye = Athlete not required to compete in round

Track and road events

Athlete	Event	Final	
Athlete	Event	Result	Rank
Mo'ath Alkhawaldeh	Men's marathon	2:20:01 SB	65

== Boxing ==
Jordan entered three boxers into the Olympic tournament. Two-times Olympian, Obada Al-Kasbeh (men's lightweight) qualified himself to Paris by winning the quota bouts round at the 2024 World Olympic Qualification Tournament 1 in Busto Arsizio, Italy.Zeyad Ishaish and Hussein Ishaish qualified for the games, following the triumph of their victories in quota bouts round at the 2024 World Olympic Qualification Tournament 2, in Bangkok, Thailand.

Athlete	Event	Round of 32	Round of 16	Quarterfinals	Semifinals	Final	
Athlete	Event	Opposition Result	Opposition Result	Opposition Result	Opposition Result	Opposition Result	Rank
Obada Al-Kasbeh	Men's 63.5 kg	Clancy (IRL); W 3–2	Oumiha (FRA); L 0–5	Did not advance			
Zeyad Ishaish	Men's 71 kg	Shymbergenov (KAZ); W 3–2	Okazawa (JPN); W 3–2	Richardson (GBR); L 2–3	Did not advance		
Hussein Ishaish	Men's 80 kg	Bye	Veočić (CRO); L 0–5	Did not advance			

== Gymnastics ==
=== Artistic ===
For the first time in history, Jordan entered one gymnast to compete at the games. Ahmad Abu Al-Soud secured a quota place by virtue of becoming the highest eligible gymnast, not yet qualified, through the final ranking of 2024 FIG Artistic Gymnastics World Cup series, making the nation's debut at the sport.

Men

Athlete	Event	Qualification		Final	
Athlete	Event	Total	Rank	Total	Rank
Ahmad Abu Al-Soud	Pommel horse	12.466	51	Did not advance	

== Swimming ==
Jordan sent two swimmers to compete at the 2024 Paris Olympics.

Athlete	Event	Heat		Semifinal		Final	
Athlete	Event	Time	Rank	Time	Rank	Time	Rank
Amro Al-Wir	Men's 200 m breaststroke	2:15.78	23	Did not advance			
Karin Belbeisi	Women's 400 m freestyle	4:37.30	21	—N/a		Did not advance	

== Table tennis ==
For the first time since 2008, Jordan entered one athlete into the games. Zaid Abo Yaman secured his spot at the Games via winning the gold medal for men's single event, through the 2024 West Asian Qualification Tournament in Sulaymaniyah, Iraq

Athlete	Event	Preliminary	Round 1	Round 2	Round 3	Round of 16	Quarterfinals	Semifinals	Final / BM	
Athlete	Event	Opposition Result	Opposition Result	Opposition Result	Opposition Result	Opposition Result	Opposition Result	Opposition Result	Opposition Result	Rank
Zaid Abo Yaman	Men's singles	Desai (IND); L 0–4	Did not advance							

== Taekwondo ==
Jordan qualified four athletes to compete at the games. Zaid Kareem, Saleh El-Sharabaty and Julyana Al-Sadeq qualified for the games by virtue of finishing in the top five in the Olympic rankings in their respective events. Later on, Rama Abu Al-Rub joining the squad after winning the semifinal rounds in her class, at the 2024 Asian Qualification Tournament in Tai'an, China.

Athlete	Event	Round of 16	Quarterfinals	Semifinals	Repechage	Final / BM	
Athlete	Event	Opposition Result	Opposition Result	Opposition Result	Opposition Result	Opposition Result	Rank
Zaid Kareem	Men's −68 kg	Pontes (BRA); W 2–1	Reçber (TUR); W 2–0	Sinden (GBR); W 2–1	—N/a	Rashitov (UZB); L 0–2	2nd place, silver medalist(s)
Saleh El-Sharabaty	Men's −80 kg	Marques (BRA); L 0–2	Did not advance				
Julyana Al-Sadeq	Women's −67 kg	Nav Naitasi (FIJ); W 2–0	Song J (CHN); L 1–2	Did not advance			
Rama Abu Al-Rub	Women's +67 kg	Aboufaras (MAR); W 2–1	Kuş (TUR); L 1–2	Did not advance			
