= Tajikistan at the 2011 Asian Winter Games =

- IOC code: TJK
- NOC: National Olympic Committee of the Republic of Tajikistan

in Astana and Almaty
- Competitors: 2 in 1 sport
- Medals: Gold 0 Silver 0 Bronze 0 Total 0

Asian Winter Games appearances
- 1996; 1999; 2003; 2007; 2011; 2017; 2025; 2029

Tajikistan will participate in the 2011 Asian Winter Games in Almaty and Astana, Kazakhstan from January 30, 2011, to February 6, 2011. The nation will send more than 1 athlete in 1 sport

== Alpine skiing ==
Tajikistan will send 2 male alpine skiers.

Men

Athlete	Event	Final	
Athlete	Event	Time	Rank
Alisher Kudratov	Super-G	1:15.83	11
Alisher Kudratov	Super Combined	Did not finish	
Abdugafor Sharipov	Super-G	1:20.91	15
Abdugafor Sharipov	Super Combined	Did not finish	
