= Shi Wancheng =

Chinese snowboarder (born 1990)

Medal record

Men's snowboarding

Representing China

Asian Games
Silver medal – second place	2007 Changchun	Halfpipe

Shi Wancheng
- Simplified Chinese: 史万成
- Traditional Chinese: 史萬成
Transcriptions
Standard Mandarin
- Hanyu Pinyin: Shǐ Wànchéng
- IPA: [ʂɻ̩̀ wân ʈʂʰə̌ŋ]

Shi Wancheng (Chinese: 史万成; pinyin: Shǐ Wànchéng; Mandarin pronunciation: [ʂɻ̩̀ wân ʈʂʰə̌ŋ]; born on 13 August 1990 in Harbin) is a Chinese snowboarder.

== 2010 Winter Olympics ==
He competed at the 2010 Winter Olympics in the Halfpipe.
