= Mouteb Al-Faouri =

Personal information
- Nationality: Jordanian
- Born: 1 March 1960 (age 66) Jordan
- Height: 178 cm (5 ft 10 in)
- Weight: 70 kg (154 lb)

Sport
- Country: Jordan
- Sport: Middle-distance running Cross-country running

Mouteb Al-Faouri (متعب الفاعوري; born 1 March 1960) is a Jordanian Olympic former middle-distance runner and cross-country runner.

He represented his country in the men's 1500 meters and the men's 800 meters at the 1984 Summer Olympics. His time was a 3:59.85 in the 1500, and a 1:53.89 in the 800 heats.

He also represented his country his nation at other competitors, including at the 1985 IAAF World Cross Country Championships in the senior men's race event.

In 2007, he was a member of the founding committee of the Jordanian American Association in New Jersey.
