= Tajikistan at the 2017 Asian Winter Games =

- IOC code: TJK
- NOC: National Olympic Committee of the Republic of Tajikistan

in Sapporo and Obihiro February 19–26
- Competitors: 4 in 1 sport
- Medals: Gold 0 Silver 0 Bronze 0 Total 0

Asian Winter Games appearances
- 1996; 1999; 2003; 2007; 2011; 2017; 2025; 2029

Tajikistan competed at the 2017 Asian Winter Games in Sapporo and Obihiro, Japan from February 19 to 26. The country's athletes competed in one sport: alpine skiing. The team consisted of four athletes.

== Background ==
All four athletes made their international debuts at the event. Bahriddin Ghoibov was originally scheduled to compete for the country at the 2011 games, but ultimately did not take part. The teams expenses for travel, accommodation, food etc. were covered by the organizing committee of the games.

== Competitors ==
The following table lists the Tajik delegation per sport and gender.

Sport	Men	Women	Total
Alpine skiing	4	0	4
Total	4	0	4

== Alpine skiing ==
Tajikistan competed in the alpine skiing events. The team consisted of four male athletes.

Men

Athlete	Event	Run 1		Run 2		Total	
Athlete	Event	Time	Rank	Time	Rank	Time	Rank
Bahriddin Ghoibov	Giant slalom	1:23.99	26	1:26.44	24	2:50.43	23
Bahriddin Ghoibov	Slalom	DSQ					
Sayfiddin Nizomiddin	Giant slalom	1:24.93	28	1:24.28	21	2:49.21	22
Sayfiddin Nizomiddin	Slalom	1:04.33	22	1:08.87	19	2:13.20	19
Sokhibnazari Tursunmurod	Giant slalom	1:21.75	24	1:26.28	23	2:48.03	21
Sokhibnazari Tursunmurod	Slalom	1:06.34	23	1:10.35	20	2:16.69	20
Barakatullo Zokirov	Giant slalom	1:22.11	25	1:23.84	20	2:45.95	20
Barakatullo Zokirov	Slalom	1:03.39	21	1:08.56	18	2:11.95	18

== See also ==
- Tajikistan at the 2014 Winter Olympics
