= Jordan at the Olympics =

- IOC code: JOR
- NOC: Jordan Olympic Committee
- Website: www.joc.jo (in English and Arabic)
- Medals Ranked 102nd: Gold 1 Silver 2 Bronze 1 Total 4

Summer appearances
- 1980; 1984; 1988; 1992; 1996; 2000; 2004; 2008; 2012; 2016; 2020; 2024; 2028

Jordan first participated at the Olympic Games in 1980, and has sent athletes to compete in every Summer Olympic Games since then. The nation has never participated in any Winter Olympic Games, although at the 1992 Winter Olympics Mohamed Hadid competed for Jordan in speed skiing.

Jordan won its first medal at the Olympic Games at Rio de Janeiro in 2016, when Ahmad Abughaush took the gold in the Men's 68 kg tournament in Taekwondo. Jordan earned its second medal at the 2020 Summer Olympics in Tokyo with another taekwondo achievement as Saleh El-Sharabaty won a silver medal in the 80 kg category. Jordan won its fourth medal at the 2024 Olympics in Paris one silver in the taekwondo Men's 68kg category by Zaid Kareem.

Samer Kamal and Ihsan Abu-Sheikha won two bronze medals in Taekwondo at the 1988 Summer Olympics at Seoul, South Korea when Taekwondo was just introduced into the Olympic Games; however, it was introduced only as a demonstration sport and therefore, are not official medals.

The National Olympic Committee for Jordan was created in 1957 and recognized by the International Olympic Committee in 1963.

The Jordan Olympic Committee is now headed by Prince Faisal Bin Al Hussein.

== Medal tables ==
=== Medals by Summer Games ===
Games	Athletes	Gold	Silver	Bronze	Total	Rank
1980 Moscow	4	0	0	0	0	–
1984 Los Angeles	5	0	0	0	0	–
1988 Seoul	3	0	0	0	0	–
1992 Barcelona	5	0	0	0	0	–
1996 Atlanta	5	0	0	0	0	–
2000 Sydney	6	0	0	0	0	–
2004 Athens	5	0	0	0	0	–
2008 Beijing	6	0	0	0	0	–
2012 London	9	0	0	0	0	–
2016 Rio de Janeiro	8	1	0	0	1	54
2020 Tokyo	14	0	1	1	2	74
2024 Paris	12	0	1	0	1	74
2028 Los Angeles	future event					
2032 Brisbane	future event					
Total (12/30)	82	1	2	1	4	102

=== Medals by sport ===
Sport	Gold	Silver	Bronze	Total
Taekwondo	1	2	0	3
Karate	0	0	1	1
Totals (2 entries)	1	2	1	4

== List of medalists ==
Medal	Name	Games	Sport	Event
Gold	Ahmad Abu-Ghaush	2016 Rio de Janeiro	Taekwondo	Men's 68 kg
Silver	Saleh El-Sharabaty	2020 Tokyo	Taekwondo	Men's 80 kg
Bronze	Abdelrahman Al-Masatfa	2020 Tokyo	Karate	Men's 67 kg
Silver	Zaid Kareem	2024 Paris	Taekwondo	Men's 68 kg

== See also ==
- List of flag bearers for Jordan at the Olympics
- Category:Olympic competitors for Jordan
