= Kazuhiro Kokubo =

Japanese snowboarder

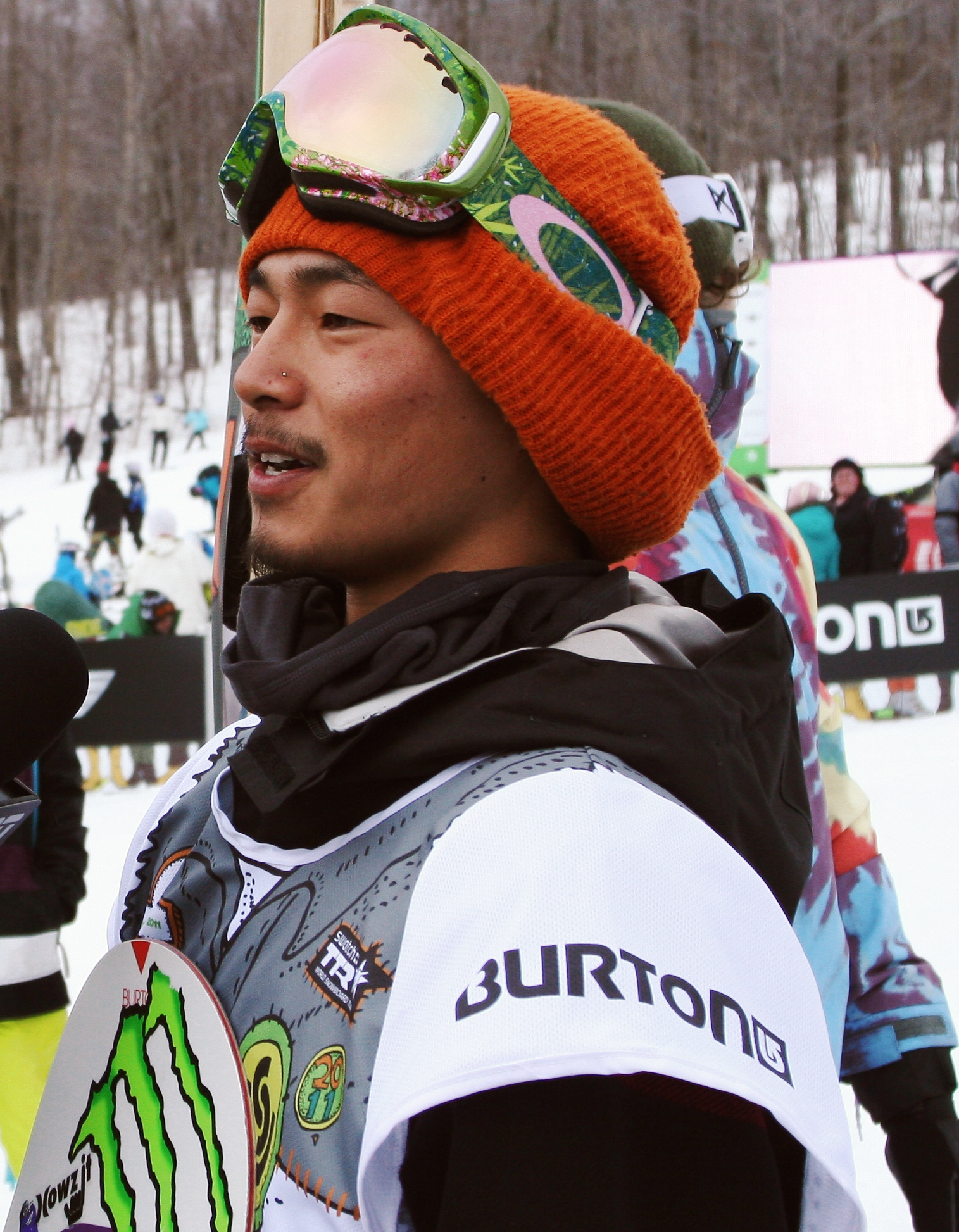
- Kokubo in 2011

Personal information
- Nickname: Kazu
- Born: August 16, 1988 (age 37) Ishikari, Hokkaido, Japan
- Home town: Hokkaido, Japan; California, U.S.

Sport
- Country: Japan
- Sport: Snowboarding
Medal record
Men's snowboarding
Representing Japan
US OPEN
Gold medal – first place	2011 Stratton	Halfpipe
US OPEN
Gold medal – first place	2010 Stratton	Halfpipe
Winter X Games
Bronze medal – third place	2010 Aspen	SuperPipe
Winter Universiade
Gold medal – first place	2009 Harbin	Halfpipe
Gold medal – first place	2009 Harbin	BigAir
NZ OPEN
Gold medal – first place	2009 Snow Park	Halfpipe
FIS Snowboarding World Championships
Silver medal – second place	2007 Arosa	Halfpipe
Asian Games
Gold medal – first place	2007 Changchun	Halfpipe
World Cup
Bronze medal – third place	2005 Tandådalen	Halfpipe

Kazuhiro Kokubo (國母 和宏, Kokubo Kazuhiro; born August 16, 1988) is a Japanese snowboarder who has won multiple medals in international events, including consecutive golds in US Open Halfpipe in 2010 and 2011. He competed at the 2006 Turin Winter Olympics and 2010 Vancouver Winter Olympics, representing Japan.

== Career ==
Kokubo showed great aptitude from age 11. He won multiple medals in international halfpipe and bigair events, including the silver in US Open Halfpipe at the age of 14. He represented Japan in Turin Olympics and Vancouver Olympics, and had consecutive wins in US Open Halfpipe in 2010 and 2011. He mostly stays in the US in snowboarding seasons for competitions and video shooting sessions while mentoring and coaching aspiring young snowboarders including Ayumu Hirano, the 15-year-old silver medalist of 2014 winter Olympics from his home country, Japan. He is assigned as the official technical coach to the Japanese national snowboarding team since August 2013.

== Style ==
His halfpipe boarding style is often described as clean and stylish with a unique combination of tricks.

== Influence ==
Kokubo is known to be the mentor to Ayumu Hirano, a Japanese gold medalist in Halfpipe at 2022 Winter Olympics, since 2011. He was officially assigned as the technical coach to the Japanese snowboarding team for Sochi Winter Olympics, leading Ayumu Hirano and Taku Hiraoka to the Silver and Bronze medals respectively.

== Victory devoted to earthquake/tsunami victims in Japan ==
Kokubo won his second US OPEN gold at the age of 22 in March 2011, right after his home country Japan was hit by a massive earthquake and following tsunami. In his winning interview, he confessed how he was saddened by the incident, and really hoped for good for his fellow country men : "I talked to my family and everybody is okay, but I have some friends I still haven't been able to contact." "I hope my win brings a little joy and happiness to Japan." In the following April, he released a press note from JEARS (Japan Earthquake Animal Rescue and Support) where he announced an offer of support to his country. He stated, "I was speechless, and for the first time since I was a kid, I sat and cried as we watched the news reports." "I knew immediately that I wanted to help my country and like so many people, I didn't know how. My main focus was not on winning or the competition itself at that point, but just getting the day over with and being with my wife who was flying to California from Japan."

== Controversy ==
Kokubo was criticized for his style of dress on February 9, 2010, after he was seen at the Narita International Airport wearing his Olympic team uniform with his shirt untucked, his trousers hanging low, and his tie loosened. Next day, when asked by the press, Kokubo said he was sorry about his dress, but the microphone caught Kokubo murmuring in a low voice "shut up". Subsequently, he was barred from the Olympic opening ceremony. This caused a controversy in Japan regarding whether an Olympian should represent the country not only in his/her athletic effort but also in cultural contexts.
