= Kang Min-heuk =

South Korean alpine skier (born 1981)

Personal information
- Nationality: South Korean
- Born: 29 October 1981 (age 44)

Sport
- Sport: Alpine skiing

Korean name
- Hangul: 강민혁
- RR: Gang Minhyeok
- MR: Kang Minhyŏk

Kang Min-heuk (born 29 October 1981) is a South Korean alpine skier. He competed at the 2002 Winter Olympics and the 2006 Winter Olympics.
