= Zeina Shaban =

Jordanian table tennis player

Sport
- Sport: Table tennis

Princess Zeina Rashid (Arabic: زينة راشد; born Zeina Shaban; 12 May 1988) is a Jordanian artist, sports executive, former table tennis player and a member of the Jordanian royal family. She represented Jordan in table tennis at the 2004 and 2008 Summer Olympics and served as the country's flag bearer at the opening ceremony of the 2008 Beijing Olympic Games. She is Vice President of the Jordan Taekwondo Federation and Vice President of the International Table Tennis Federation (ITTF).

== Table tennis career ==
Born in Amman, Jordan, Shaban was introduced to table tennis at the age of six, where she occasionally played with her father. In 1996, she headed with her family to watch the Summer Olympic games in Atlanta, Georgia. Shaban rapidly changed her life, when she first met Chinese table tennis player and then-world champion Deng Yaping, who motivated her to play for the sport.

Following her training in China and even in Europe, Shaban achieved an early success in table tennis, when she claimed the title for the under-14 category at the national junior championships. At the age of ten, she made her inaugural international appearance at the U.S. Open Table Tennis Tournament in Fort Lauderdale, Florida, where she displayed her exquisite talent and performance to obtain the tournament title in the women's under-10 category. She continued to build her success in sport by participating as the nation's leading player at the ITTF World Junior Circuit, ITTF Pro Tour and at both the Liebherr World Individual Championships and World Team Championships. She also won two silver medals at the Arab Cup in Sanaa, Yemen (2003) and in Beirut, Lebanon (2004).

In 2003, Shaban was named Jordan's athlete of the year. She was also selected for an Olympic Solidarity Scholarship, which helped her in qualify for the Olympic games.

At age sixteen, Shaban made her debut for the 2004 Summer Olympics in Athens, after booking her place from the West Asian Olympic Qualification Tournament in Doha, Qatar. She reached the second preliminary match of the women's singles, where she lost to three-time Olympian Adriana Simion-Zamfir of Romania. Shortly after the Olympics, she was awarded the prestigious King Hussein Medal for Achievement by His Majesty King Abdullah II, for her full participation to the games and vast display of sportsmanship and national pride.

At the 2008 Summer Olympics in Beijing, Shaban was given the honor and prestige of carrying the nation's flag in the opening ceremony. She competed for the second time in the women's singles tournament, where she lost her first match to Czech Republic's Dana Hadačová, with a set score of 0–4.

Shaban is a member of TTF Liebherr Ochsenhausen and 3B Berlin Table Tennis Club in Germany, being coached and trained by Swedish national Anders Johansson.

== Personal life ==
Shaban is also a management graduate, with a degree major in economics, at the Royal Holloway, University of London. On July 22, 2011, she married Prince Rashid bin Hassan at the Basman Palace in Amman. She has given birth to two sons, Prince Hassan and Prince Talal since her marriage.
