= Jordan at the 2007 Asian Winter Games =

- IOC code: JOR
- NOC: Jordan Olympic Committee

in Changchun
- Competitors: 3
- Medals Ranked 7th: Gold 0 Silver 0 Bronze 0 Total 0

Asian Winter Games appearances
- 2007; 2011; 2017; 2025; 2029

Jordan participated in the 2007 Asian Winter Games held in Changchun, China from January 28, 2007 to February 4, 2007.
