= Yasuhiro Ikuta =

Japanese alpine skier (born 1979)

Personal information
- Nationality: Japanese
- Born: 12 June 1979 (age 46) Obanazawa, Yamagata, Japan

Sport
- Sport: Alpine skiing

Yasuhiro Ikuta (生田 康宏, Ikuta Yasuhiro; born 12 June 1979) is a Japanese alpine skier. He competed in the men's slalom at the 2006 Winter Olympics.
