= Marjan Kalhor =

Iranian alpine skier (born 1988)

Personal information
- Full name: Marjan Kalhor
- Born: 21 July 1988 (age 38) Tehran, Iran
- Height: 1.68 m (5 ft 6 in)
- Weight: 60 kg (132 lb)

Sport
- Country: Iran
- Sport: Alpine skiing
- Event: Slalom giant slalom

Marjan Kalhor (Persian: مرجان كلهر; born 21 July 1988 in Tehran) is an Kurdish alpine skier who became the first Iranian woman to participate in the Winter Olympics, at the 2010 Vancouver Olympics. Kalhor competed in the slalom and giant slalom competitions. She was her nation's flag bearer in the Opening Ceremony. Kalhor finished 60th among 86 competitors in the giant slalom and 55th among 87 participants in the slalom.

Kalhor started skiing at the age of four, in the Dizin resort north of Tehran, in the Alborz mountain range. At the age of eleven, she won a national competition, and later competed and won medals in Turkey and Lebanon. She has not yet competed in a World Cup event. Kalhor is studying to become a physical education teacher.

On 7 June 2023, Kalhour immigrated to France along with fellow Iranian skier Porya Saveh Shemshaki.
