= Viktor Ryabchenko =

Kazakhstani alpine skier (born 1982)

Personal information
- Nationality: Kazakhstani
- Born: 8 September 1982 (age 44) Almaty, Soviet Union

Sport
- Sport: Alpine skiing

Viktor Ryabchenko (Виктор Анатольевич Рябченко, born 8 September 1982) is a Kazakhstani alpine skier. He competed in two events at the 2006 Winter Olympics.
