= Porya Saveh Shemshaki =

Iranian alpine skier (born 1987)

Personal information
- Born: 30 April 1987 (age 38) Tehran, Iran
- Height: 1.75 m (5 ft 9 in)
- Weight: 77 kg (170 lb)

Sport
- Country: Iran
- Sport: Alpine skiing

Porya Saveh Shemshaki (born 30 April 1987) is an alpine skier from Iran. He, along with his brother, Hossein Saveh Shemshaki, competed for Iran at the 2010 Winter Olympics. His best result was a 60th place in the giant slalom. He also competed at the 2007 Asian Winter Games and 2011 Asian Winter Games.

On 7 June 2023, Saveh Shemshaki immigrated to France along with fellow Iranian skier Marjan Kalhor.

Exclusive to Iran International; Two more skiers immigrate to France | Iran International
