= Oh Jae-eun =

South Korean alpine skier (born 1983)

Personal information
- Full name: 오재은
- Nationality: South Korean
- Born: 15 May 1983 (age 41); Seoul, South Korea

Sport
- Sport: Alpine skiing

Oh Jae-eun (born 15 May 1983) is a South Korean alpine skier. She competed in two events at the 2006 Winter Olympics. She won a bronze medal at the 2007 Asian Winter Games.
