= Lebanon at the 2007 Asian Winter Games =

- IOC code: LIB
- NOC: Lebanese Olympic Committee

in Changchun
- Competitors: 1 in 1 sport

Asian Winter Games appearances
- 1996; 1999; 2003; 2007; 2011; 2017; 2025; 2029

Lebanon participated in the 2007 Asian Winter Games held in Changchun, China from January 28, 2007 to February 4, 2007. This country was represented by 1 athlete in the snowboarding competition.

== Snowboarding ==
Athlete	Event	Qualification				Final			
Athlete	Event	Run 1	Run 2	Best	Rank	Run 1	Run 2	Best	Rank
Marwa El Hage	Women's halfpipe	5.2	6.5	5.2	8	Did not advance			
