= Kyrgyzstan at the 2007 Asian Winter Games =

- IOC code: KGZ
- NOC: National Olympic Committee of the Republic of Kyrgyzstan

in Changchun
- Competitors: 5
- Medals Ranked –th: Gold 0 Silver 0 Bronze 0 Total 0

Asian Winter Games appearances
- 1996; 1999; 2003; 2007; 2011; 2017; 2025; 2029

Kyrgyzstan, participated in the 2007 Asian Winter Games held in Changchun, China from January 28, 2007 to February 4, 2007.
