= Pakistan at the 2007 Asian Winter Games =

- IOC code: PAK
- NOC: Pakistan Olympic Association

in Changchun
- Competitors: 7

Asian Winter Games appearances
- 1996; 1999; 2003; 2007; 2011; 2017; 2025; 2029

Pakistan participated in the 2007 Asian Winter Games held in Changchun, China from January 28, 2007 to February 4, 2007.
