= Jordan Olympic Committee =

National Olympic Committee

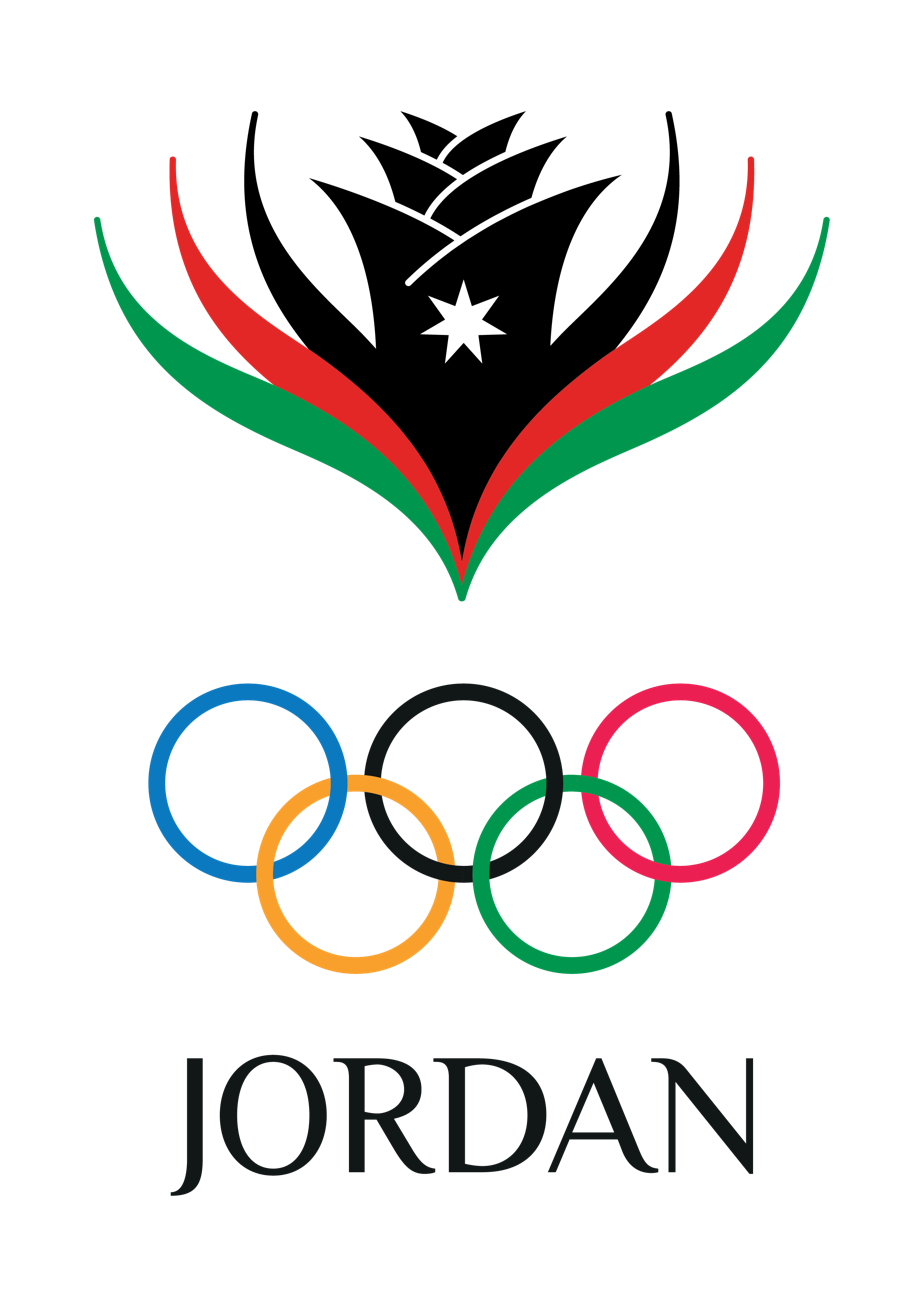
- Country: Jordan
- [[|]]
- Code: JOR
- Created: 1957
- Recognized: 1963
- Continental Association: OCA
- Headquarters: Amman, Jordan
- President: Prince Faisal bin Al Hussein
- Secretary General: Rana Nazmi Al-Saeed
- Website: www.joc.jo

The Jordan Olympic Committee (Arabic: اللجنة الأولمبية الأردنية, IOC code: JOR) is the National Olympic Committee representing Jordan, and is the umbrella organisation responsible for managing, developing and promoting sport in Jordan.

== Member federations ==
- Jordan Athletics Federation
- Jordan Badminton Federation
- Jordan Basketball Federation
- Jordan Federation for Billiard and Snooker
- Jordan Bowling Federation
- Jordan Bridge Federation
- Jordan Cycling Federation
- Jordan Fencing Federation
- Jordan Sport Information Federation
- Jordan Amateur Boxing Association
- Jordan Kick Boxing Association
- Jordan Sport Medicine Federation
- Jordan Paralympic Committee
- Jordan School Sports Federation
- Jordan Squash Federation
- Jordan Swimming Federation
- Jordan Table Tennis Federation
- Jordan Taekwondo Federation
- Jordan Volleyball Federation
- Jordan Weightlifting Federation
- Royal Jordanian Equestrian Federation
- Jordan Judo Federation
- Jordan Football Association
- Jordan Shooting Federation
- Jordan Handball Federation
- Jordan Gymnastics Federation
- Brazilian Jiu-Jitsu Federation of Jordan
- Royal Jordanian Chess Federation
- Jordan Bodybuilding Federation
- Jordan Wrestling Federation
- Jordan Golf Federation
- Jordan Karate Federation
- Jordan Triathlon Association
- Jordan Marine Sports Federation
- Jordan Motorsport
- Jordan Rugby Committee
- Jordan Camel Committee
- Jordan Tennis Federation

== See also ==
- Jordan at the Olympics
