= List of flag bearers for Iran at the Olympics =

Iran at the Olympics
- IOC code: IRI
- NOC: National Olympic Committee of the Islamic Republic of Iran
- Website: www.olympic.ir (in Persian and English)
- Medals: Gold 27 Silver 29 Bronze 32 Total 88

Summer appearances
- 1900; 1904–1936; 1948; 1952; 1956; 1960; 1964; 1968; 1972; 1976; 1980–1984; 1988; 1992; 1996; 2000; 2004; 2008; 2012; 2016; 2020; 2024

Winter appearances
- 1956; 1960; 1964; 1968; 1972; 1976; 1980–1994; 1998; 2002; 2006; 2010; 2014; 2018; 2022; 2026

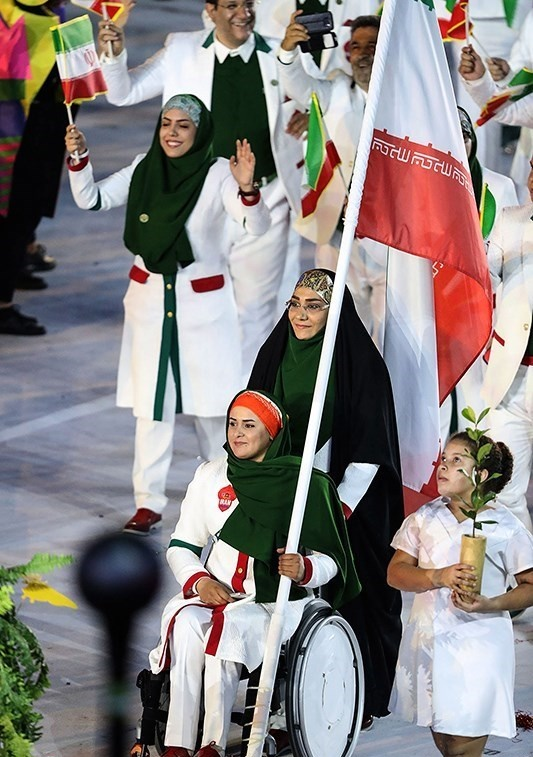
Zahra Nemati takes Iran's flag at the 2016 Summer Olympics' Parade of Nations

This is a list of flag bearers who have represented Iran at the Olympics.

Flag bearers carry the national flag of their country at the opening ceremony of the Olympic Games.

#	Event year	Season	Flag bearer	Sport	Ref
1	1948	Summer	Mostafa Baharmast	Official	
2	1952	Summer	Mahmoud Namjoo	Weightlifting	
3	1956	Winter	Simon Farzami	Official	
4	1956	Summer	Mahmoud Namjoo	Weightlifting	
5	1960	Summer	Jafar Salmasi	Official	
6	1964	Winter	Ovaness Meguerdounian	Alpine skiing	
7	1964	Summer	Nosratollah Shahmir	Official	
8	1968	Winter	Ovaness Meguerdounian	Alpine skiing	
9	1968	Summer	Abolfazl Anvari	Wrestling	
10	1972	Winter	Ovaness Meguerdounian	Official	
11	1972	Summer	Moslem Eskandar-Filabi	Wrestling	
12	1976	Winter	Lotfollah Kiashemshaki	Official	
13	1976	Summer	Moslem Eskandar-Filabi	Wrestling	
14	1988	Summer	Hassan Zahedi	Taekwondo	
15	1992	Summer	Alireza Soleimani	Wrestling	
16	1996	Summer	Lida Fariman	Shooting	
17	1998	Winter	Hassan Shemshaki	Alpine skiing	
18	2000	Summer	Amir Reza Khadem	Wrestling	
19	2002	Winter	Bagher Kalhor	Alpine skiing	
20	2004	Summer	Arash Miresmaeili	Judo	
21	2006	Winter	Alidad Saveh-Shemshaki	Alpine skiing	
22	2008	Summer	Homa Hosseini	Rowing	
23	2010	Winter	Marjan Kalhor	Alpine skiing	
24	2012	Summer	Ali Mazaheri	Boxing	
25	2014	Winter	Hossein Saveh-Shemshaki	Alpine skiing	
26	2016	Summer	Zahra Nemati	Archery	
27	2018	Winter	Samaneh Beyrami Baher	Cross-country skiing	
28	2020	Summer	Samad Nikkhah Bahrami	Basketball	
28	2020	Summer	Hanieh Rostamian	Shooting	
29	2022	Winter	Atefeh Ahmadi	Alpine skiing	
29	2022	Winter	Hossein Saveh-Shemshaki	Alpine skiing	
30	2024	Summer	Mahdi Olfati	Artistic gymnastics	
30	2024	Summer	Neda Shahsavari	Table tennis	

== See also ==
- Iran at the Olympics
