= 2018 Asian Alpine Ski Championships =

The 2018 Asian Alpine Ski Championships were the 27th Asian Alpine Ski Championships and took place from March 4–6, 2018, in Darbandsar Ski Resort, Darband Sar, Iran.

== Medal summary ==
=== Men ===
Event	Gold	Silver	Bronze
Slalom	Mohammad Kiadarbandsari; Iran	Igor Zakurdayev; Kazakhstan	Hossein Saveh-Shemshaki; Iran
Giant slalom	Zakhar Kuchin; Kazakhstan	Mohammad Kiadarbandsari; Iran	Igor Zakurdayev; Kazakhstan
Super-G	Igor Zakurdayev; Kazakhstan	Mohammad Kiadarbandsari; Iran	Zakhar Kuchin; Kazakhstan
Alpine combined	Mohammad Kiadarbandsari; Iran	Igor Zakurdayev; Kazakhstan	Hossein Saveh-Shemshaki; Iran

=== Women ===
Event	Gold	Silver	Bronze
Slalom	Shin Hyo-im; South Korea	Forough Abbasi; Iran	Yekaterina Karpova; Kazakhstan
Giant slalom	Mariya Grigorova; Kazakhstan	Sadaf Saveh-Shemshaki; Iran	Shin Hyo-im; South Korea
Super-G	Mariya Grigorova; Kazakhstan	Atefeh Ahmadi; Iran	Sadaf Saveh-Shemshaki; Iran
Alpine combined	Mariya Grigorova; Kazakhstan	Sadaf Saveh-Shemshaki; Iran	Forough Abbasi; Iran

== Medal table ==
Rank	Nation	Gold	Silver	Bronze	Total
1	Kazakhstan	5	2	3	10
2	Iran	2	6	4	12
3	South Korea	1	0	1	2
Totals (3 entries)		8	8	8	24
