= Iran at the 1964 Winter Olympics =

- IOC code: IRI (IRN used at these Games)
- NOC: National Olympic Committee of Iran
- Website: www.olympic.ir (in Persian and English)

in Innsbruck
- Competitors: 4 in 1 sport
- Flag bearer: Ovaness Meguerdounian
- Medals: Gold 0 Silver 0 Bronze 0 Total 0

Winter Olympics appearances (overview)
- 1956; 1960; 1964; 1968; 1972; 1976; 1980–1994; 1998; 2002; 2006; 2010; 2014; 2018; 2022; 2026

Iran competed at the 1964 Winter Olympics in Innsbruck, Austria. Four athletes and two officials represented Iran in the 1964 Olympics.

== Competitors ==
Sport	Men	Women	Total
Skiing, Alpine	4		4
Total	4	0	4

== Results by event ==
=== Skiing ===
==== Alpine ====
Men

Athlete	Event	Qualifying run 1		Qualifying run 2		Final			Rank
Athlete	Event	Time	Rank	Time	Rank	Run 1	Run 2	Total	Rank
Prince Karim Aga Khan	Slalom	1:11.92	67	1:01.68	30	did not advance			55
Prince Karim Aga Khan	Giant slalom					2:13.57			53
Prince Karim Aga Khan	Downhill					2:42.59			59
Feizollah Bandali	Slalom	1:05.60	56	1:03.80	37	did not advance			62
Feizollah Bandali	Giant slalom					2:21.05			65
Feizollah Bandali	Downhill					2:52.44			66
Lotfollah Kiashemshaki	Slalom	1:08.47	62	Disqualified		did not advance			—
Lotfollah Kiashemshaki	Giant slalom					2:17.11			60
Lotfollah Kiashemshaki	Downhill					2:50.70			65
Ovaness Meguerdounian	Slalom	did not finish		1:04.38	40	did not advance			65
Ovaness Meguerdounian	Giant slalom					2:19.28			64
Ovaness Meguerdounian	Downhill					2:57.10			69
