= Iran at the 1968 Winter Olympics =

- IOC code: IRI (IRA used at these Games)
- NOC: National Olympic Committee of Iran
- Website: www.olympic.ir (in Persian and English)

in Grenoble
- Competitors: 4 in 1 sport
- Flag bearer: Ovaness Meguerdounian
- Medals: Gold 0 Silver 0 Bronze 0 Total 0

Winter Olympics appearances (overview)
- 1956; 1960; 1964; 1968; 1972; 1976; 1980–1994; 1998; 2002; 2006; 2010; 2014; 2018; 2022; 2026

Iran had four competitors at the 1968 Winter Olympics in Grenoble, France. All took part in the men's Alpine Skiing events, with the highest finish being 66th place by Lotfollah Kiashemshaki in the Downhill.

== Competitors ==
Sport	Men	Women	Total
Skiing, Alpine	4		4
Total	4	0	4

== Results by event ==
=== Skiing ===
==== Alpine ====
Men

Athlete	Event	Qualifying run 1			Qualifying run 2			Final			Rank
Athlete	Event	Heat	Time	Rank	Heat	Time	Rank	Run 1	Run 2	Total	Rank
Feizollah Bandali	Slalom	D	58.90	4	D	Disqualified		did not advance			—
Feizollah Bandali	Giant slalom							2:05.44	2:04.64	4:10.08	70
Feizollah Bandali	Downhill							2:27.07			68
Lotfollah Kiashemshaki	Slalom	C	57.18	5	C	did not finish		did not advance			—
Lotfollah Kiashemshaki	Giant slalom							2:05.10	2:07.45	4:12.55	71
Lotfollah Kiashemshaki	Downhill							2:23.60			66
Ovaness Meguerdounian	Slalom	P	did not finish		P	1:03.41	3	did not advance			80
Ovaness Meguerdounian	Giant slalom							2:08.10	2:08.58	4:16.68	73
Ovaness Meguerdounian	Downhill							2:30.25			69
Ali Saveh-Shemshaki	Slalom	E	57.93	4	E	57.87	2	did not advance			67
Ali Saveh-Shemshaki	Giant slalom							2:17.78	2:05.94	4:23.72	77
Ali Saveh-Shemshaki	Downhill							2:47.88			73
