= Iran at the 1972 Winter Olympics =

- IOC code: IRI (IRN used at these Games)
- NOC: National Olympic Committee of Iran
- Website: www.olympic.ir (in Persian and English)

in Sapporo
- Competitors: 4 in 1 sport
- Flag bearer: Ovaness Meguerdounian
- Medals: Gold 0 Silver 0 Bronze 0 Total 0

Winter Olympics appearances (overview)
- 1956; 1960; 1964; 1968; 1972; 1976; 1980–1994; 1998; 2002; 2006; 2010; 2014; 2018; 2022; 2026

Iran competed at the 1972 Winter Olympics in Sapporo, Japan. Four athletes and three officials represented Iran in the 1972 Olympics.

== Competitors ==
Sport	Men	Women	Total
Skiing, Alpine	4		4
Total	4	0	4

== Results by event ==
=== Skiing ===
==== Alpine ====
Men

Athlete	Event	1st run	2nd run	Total	Rank
Feizollah Bandali	Slalom	1:18.14	1:14.61	2:32.75	32
Feizollah Bandali	Giant slalom	1:55.72	2:08.42	4:04.14	40
Feizollah Bandali	Downhill	2:18.19			54
Ghorban Ali Kalhor	Slalom	1:18.34	1:19.19	2:37.53	33
Ghorban Ali Kalhor	Giant slalom	DSQ	—	—	—
Ghorban Ali Kalhor	Downhill	2:20.98			55
Lotfollah Kiashemshaki	Slalom		DNF	—	—
Lotfollah Kiashemshaki	Giant slalom	2:07.26	1:58.95	4:06.21	43
Lotfollah Kiashemshaki	Downhill	2:16.14			53
Ali Saveh-Shemshaki	Slalom		DSQ	—	—
Ali Saveh-Shemshaki	Giant slalom	2:08.05	1:58.83	4:06.88	44
Ali Saveh-Shemshaki	Downhill	2:11.29			52
