= Iran at the 2022 Winter Olympics =

- Flag of Iran
- IOC code: IRI
- NOC: National Olympic Committee of the Islamic Republic of Iran
- Website: www.olympic.ir (in Persian and English)

in Beijing, China 4–20 February 2022
- Competitors: 3 (2 men and 1 woman) in 2 sports
- Flag bearers (opening): Atefeh Ahmadi; Hossein Saveh-Shemshaki
- Flag bearer (closing): Volunteer
- Medals: Gold 0 Silver 0 Bronze 0 Total 0

Winter Olympics appearances (overview)
- 1956; 1960; 1964; 1968; 1972; 1976; 1980–1994; 1998; 2002; 2006; 2010; 2014; 2018; 2022; 2026

Iran competed at the 2022 Winter Olympics in Beijing, China, from 4 to 20 February 2022.

Iran's team consisted of two athletes (one man and one woman) competing in alpine skiing disciplines and cross-country skiing. On January 23, 2022, alpine skiers Atefeh Ahmadi and Hossein Saveh-Shemshaki were named as the Iranian flagbearers during the opening ceremony. Meanwhile a volunteer was the flagbearer during the closing ceremony.

== Competitors ==
The following is the list of number of competitors participating at the Games per sport/discipline.

Sport	Men	Women	Total
Alpine skiing	1	1	2
Cross country skiing	1	0	1
Total	2	1	3

== Alpine skiing ==
By meeting the basic qualification standards, Iran qualified one male and one female alpine skier. On 10 February 2022, Hossein Saveh-Shemshaki became the first athlete to provide a positive test for doping at the 2022 Winter Olympics and did not compete in any events.

Athlete	Event	Run 1		Run 2		Total	
Athlete	Event	Time	Rank	Time	Rank	Time	Rank
Atefeh Ahmadi	Women's slalom	1:11.88	57	DNF			

== Cross-country skiing ==
By meeting the basic qualification standards, Iran qualified one male cross-country skier.

Distance

Athlete	Event	Final		
Athlete	Event	Time	Deficit	Rank
Danial Saveh Shemshaki	Men's 15 km classical	47:26.0	+9:31.2	84
