= Alpine skiing at the 2019 Winter Universiade – Women's combined =

Women's combined at the XXIX Winter Universiade
- Venues: Bobrovy Log
- Dates: 4 March
- Competitors: 54 from 21 nations
- Winning time: 1:31.38

Medalists
1st place, gold medalist(s)		Jessica Gfrerer	Austria
2nd place, silver medalist(s)		Amélie Dupasquier	Switzerland
3rd place, bronze medalist(s)		Carmen Haro	France

The women's combined competition of the 2019 Winter Universiade was held at Bobrovy Log, Krasnoyarsk, Russia on 4 March 2019.

== Results ==
The race was started at 10:00 (super-G race) and 13:30 (slalom race).

Rank	Bib	Name	Nation	Super-G	Rank	Slalom	Rank	Total	Behind
1st place, gold medalist(s)	6	Jessica Gfrerer	Austria	58.50	1	32.88	8	1:31.38	—
2nd place, silver medalist(s)	15	Amélie Dupasquier	Switzerland	58.66	2	33.27	11	1:31.93	+0.55
3rd place, bronze medalist(s)	36	Carmen Haro	France	59.88	15	32.24	4	1:32.12	+0.74
4	3	Denise Dingsleder	Austria	59.93	16	32.27	5	1:32.20	+0.82
5	47	Ekaterina Tkachenko	Russia	59.55	8	32.78	7	1:32.33	+0.95
6	31	Veronika Čamková	Czech Republic	58.83	3	33.51	14	1:32.34	+0.96
7	8	Agnes Dahlin	Sweden	1:00.62	23	32.09	2	1:32.71	+1.33
8	22	Petra Smaldore	Italy	1:00.71	27	32.08	1	1:32.79	+1.41
9	18	Petra Hromcová	Slovakia	59.77	13	33.19	10	1:32.96	+1.58
10	50	Nanoha Matsumoto	Japan	1:00.70	26	32.29	6	1:32.99	+1.61
11	27	Tereza Nová	Czech Republic	59.86	14	33.15	9	1:33.01	+1.63
11	24	Elise Guilbert	France	1:00.82	30	32.19	3	1:33.01	+1.63
13	10	Saša Brezovnik	Slovenia	59.99	17	33.33	12	1:33.32	+1.94
14	1	Sandra Absmann	Austria	59.69	11	33.89	17	1:33.58	+2.20
15	7	Katarzyna Wąsek	Poland	1:00.34	19	33.64	15	1:33.98	+2.60
16	34	Elizaveta Timchenko	Russia	59.40	7	34.75	25	1:34.15	+2.77
17	33	Nikola Bubáková	Czech Republic	1:00.53	21	33.69	16	1:34.22	+2.84
18	29	Milena Fokina	Russia	59.56	10	34.75	25	1:34.31	+2.93
19	32	Perrine Clair	France	1:00.98	35	33.47	13	1:34.45	+3.07
20	40	Laurence Huot	Canada	1:00.61	22	34.09	20	1:34.70	+3.32
21	21	Anne-Sophie Loretan	Switzerland	1:00.27	18	34.56	24	1:34.83	+3.45
22	48	Jessica Albertin	Switzerland	59.11	4	35.80	30	1:34.91	+3.53
23	38	Tereza Zahálková	Czech Republic	1:00.72	28	34.27	21	1:34.99	+3.61
24	46	Liene Bondare	Latvia	1:00.80	29	34.34	23	1:35.14	+3.61
25	51	Yoko Ishijima	Japan	1:01.04	36	34.27	21	1:35.31	+3.93
26	14	Sofia Krokhina	Russia	1:01.63	43	33.97	18	1:35.60	+4.22
27	49	Arata Wakatsuki	Japan	1:01.92	46	33.97	18	1:35.89	+4.51
28	4	Lana Zbasnik	Croatia	1:01.25	37	34.77	27	1:36.02	+4.64
29	28	Olivia Wenk	Germany	1:00.90	33	35.49	29	1:36.39	+5.01
30	20	Nora Schweizer	Switzerland	1:00.65	24	35.98	33	1:36.63	+5.25
31	19	Victoria Bolješić	Serbia	1:00.93	34	35.90	32	1:36.83	+5.45
32	53	Marie Desrosiers	Canada	1:00.87	32	36.34	34	1:37.21	+5.83
33	42	Adrienne Poitras	Canada	1:01.89	45	35.44	28	1:37.33	+5.95
34	9	Aleksandra Karachun	Russia	1:01.62	42	35.83	31	1:37.45	+6.07
35	39	Noh Jin-soul	South Korea	1:01.57	41	36.39	35	1:37.96	+6.58
36	25	Tanja Intlekofer	Germany	1:01.41	39	37.14	36	1:38.55	+7.17
37	43	Han Ji-hye	South Korea	1:03.13	51	37.41	37	1:40.54	+9.16
38	44	Louise Van den Bosch	Belgium	1:02.94	50	37.94	39	1:40:88	+9.50
39	45	Evelyn Hrehorová	Slovakia	1:03.85	52	37.89	38	1:41.74	+10.36
40	30	Mariya Grigorova	Kazakhstan	1:02.41	48	40.17	40	1:42.58	+11.20
41	54	Lise Anette Vaher	Estonia	1:05.16	53	40.67	41	1:45.83	+14.45
42	41	Zofia Zdort	Poland	59.39	6	53.83	42	1:53.22	+21.84
	23	Alexandra Bauer	Sweden	59.70	12	DNF	—		
	37	Lea Chapuis	France	1:00.68	25	DNF	—		
	2	Anastasia Gornostaeva	Russia	59.55	9	DNF	—		
	17	Kenza Lacheb	France	1:01.50	40	DNF	—		
	26	Nea Luukko	Finland	1:01.36	38	DNF	—		
	5	Martina Nobis	Italy	1:00.82	30	DNF	—		
	11	Zuzanna Czapska	Poland	1:00.48	20	DNF	—		
	13	Nina Lea Bertsch	Switzerland	1:01.82	44	DNF	—		
	12	Fanny Axelsson	Finland	59.35	5	DNF	—		
	16	Katrin Don	Slovenia	1:02.79	49	DSQ	—		
	35	Viola Sertorelli	Italy	1:02.28	47	DNS	—		
	52	Sabrina Cormier	Canada	DSQ		—			
