= Iran at the 2018 Winter Olympics =

- Flag of Iran
- IOC code: IRI
- NOC: National Olympic Committee of the Islamic Republic of Iran
- Website: www.olympic.ir (in Persian and English)

in Pyeongchang, South Korea 9–25 February 2018
- Competitors: 4 in 2 sports
- Flag bearer: Samaneh Beyrami Baher (opening)
- Medals: Gold 0 Silver 0 Bronze 0 Total 0

Winter Olympics appearances (overview)
- 1956; 1960; 1964; 1968; 1972; 1976; 1980–1994; 1998; 2002; 2006; 2010; 2014; 2018; 2022; 2026

Iran competed at the 2018 Winter Olympics in Pyeongchang, South Korea, from 9 to 25 February 2018, with four competitors in two sports.

== Competitors ==
The following is the list of number of competitors participating in the Iranian delegation per sport.

Sport	Men	Women	Total
Alpine skiing	1	1	2
Cross-country skiing	1	1	2
Total	2	2	4

== Alpine skiing ==
Iran qualified two athletes, one male and one female.

Athlete	Event	Run 1		Run 2		Total	
Athlete	Event	Time	Rank	Time	Rank	Time	Rank
Mohammad Kiyadarbandsari	Men's giant slalom	1:19.11	63	1:18.61	59	2:37.72	58
Mohammad Kiyadarbandsari	Men's slalom	55.66	42	57.03	33	1:52.69	34
Forough Abbasi	Women's slalom	1:02.56	55	1:01.50	50	2:04.06	49

== Cross-country skiing ==
Iran qualified two athletes, one male and one female.

Distance

Athlete	Event	Final		
Athlete	Event	Time	Deficit	Rank
Seyed Sattar Seyd	Men's 15 km freestyle	39:39.1	+5:55.2	91

Sprint

Athlete	Event	Qualification		Quarterfinal		Semifinal		Final	
Athlete	Event	Time	Rank	Time	Rank	Time	Rank	Time	Rank
Seyed Sattar Seyd	Men's sprint	3:58.08	76	did not advance					
Samaneh Beyrami Baher	Women's sprint	4:47.91	68	did not advance					

== See also ==
- Iran at the 2017 Asian Winter Games
- Iran at the 2018 Summer Youth Olympics
