= 2015 Asian Alpine Ski Championships =

The 2015 Asian Alpine Ski Championships were the 24th Asian Alpine Ski Championships (1st senior competition) and took place from March 3–4, 2015, in Yongpyong Resort, South Korea.

== Medal summary ==
=== Men ===
Event	Gold	Silver	Bronze
Slalom	Hossein Saveh-Shemshaki; Iran	Kim Dong-cheul; South Korea	Choi Chang-hyun; South Korea
Giant slalom	Choi Chang-hyun; South Korea	Hossein Saveh-Shemshaki; Iran	Lee Dong-geun; South Korea

=== Women ===
Event	Gold	Silver	Bronze
Slalom	Choe Jeong-hyeon; South Korea	Moe Takahashi; Japan	Sayano Sunaga; Japan
Giant slalom	Lee Hyun-ji; South Korea	Mariya Grigorova; Kazakhstan	Ko Un-sori; South Korea

== Medal table ==
Rank	Nation	Gold	Silver	Bronze	Total
1	South Korea	3	1	3	7
2	Iran	1	1	0	2
3	Japan	0	1	1	2
4	Kazakhstan	0	1	0	1
Totals (4 entries)		4	4	4	12
