= Iran at the 1976 Winter Olympics =

- IOC code: IRI (IRN used at these Games)
- NOC: National Olympic Committee of Iran
- Website: www.olympic.ir (in Persian and English)

in Innsbruck
- Competitors: 4 in 1 sport
- Flag bearer: Lotfollah Kiashemshaki
- Medals: Gold 0 Silver 0 Bronze 0 Total 0

Winter Olympics appearances (overview)
- 1956; 1960; 1964; 1968; 1972; 1976; 1980–1994; 1998; 2002; 2006; 2010; 2014; 2018; 2022; 2026

Iran competed at the 1976 Winter Olympics in Innsbruck, Austria. Four athletes represented Iran in the 1976 Olympics, all of them in alpine skiing.

== Competitors ==
| Sport | Men | Women | Total |
|---|---|---|---|
| Skiing, Alpine | 4 | | 4 |
| Total | 4 | 0 | 4 |

== Results by event ==
=== Skiing ===
==== Alpine ====
Men

| Athlete | Event | 1st run | 2nd run | Total | Rank |
|---|---|---|---|---|---|
| Ghorban Ali Kalhor | Slalom | DNF | — | — | — |
| Ghorban Ali Kalhor | Giant slalom | 2:02.30 | 2:06.65 | 4:08.95 | 47 |
| Ghorban Ali Kalhor | Downhill | 1:59.15 | | | 55 |
| Mohammad Kalhor | Slalom | | DNS | — | — |
| Mohammad Kalhor | Giant slalom | 1:59.95 | DNF | — | — |
| Mohammad Kalhor | Downhill | Did not finish | | | |
| Akbar Kalili | Slalom | DSQ | — | — | — |
| Akbar Kalili | Giant slalom | 2:02.98 | DSQ | — | — |
| Akbar Kalili | Downhill | 2:00.32 | | | 58 |
| Mohammad Hadi Kiashemshaki | Slalom | DSQ | — | — | — |
| Mohammad Hadi Kiashemshaki | Giant slalom | DNF | — | — | — |
| Mohammad Hadi Kiashemshaki | Downhill | 1:59.44 | | | 56 |
