= Alpine skiing at the 2019 Winter Universiade – Women's super-G =

Women's super-G at the XXIX Winter Universiade
- Venues: Bobrovy Log
- Dates: 3 March
- Competitors: 53 from 21 nations
- Winning time: 58.44

Medalists
1st place, gold medalist(s)		Jessica Gfrerer	Austria
2nd place, silver medalist(s)		Amélie Dupasquier	Switzerland
3rd place, bronze medalist(s)		Fanny Axelsson	Sweden

The women's super-G competition of the 2019 Winter Universiade was held at Bobrovy Log, Krasnoyarsk, Russia on 3 March 2019.

== Results ==
The race was started at 10:30.

Rank	Bib	Name	Country	Time	Difference
1st place, gold medalist(s)	3	Jessica Gfrerer	Austria	58.44	
2nd place, silver medalist(s)	2	Amélie Dupasquier	Switzerland	59.53	+1.09
3rd place, bronze medalist(s)	13	Fanny Axelsson	Sweden	59.70	+1.26
4	22	Veronika Čamková	Czech Republic	1:00.32	+1.88
4	16	Tereza Nová	Czech Republic	1:00.32	+1.88
6	5	Elizaveta Timchenko	Russia	1:00.41	+1.97
7	4	Denise Dingsleder	Austria	1:00.59	+2.15
8	30	Nea Luukko	Finland	1:00.66	+2.22
9	9	Olga Pogrebitskaya	Russia	1:00.70	+2.26
10	6	Ekaterina Perfilova	Russia	1:00.72	+2.28
11	7	Valentina Golenkova	Russia	1:00.73	+2.29
12	25	Agnes Dahlin	Sweden	1:00.78	+2.34
13	8	Saša Brezovnik	Slovenia	1:00.84	+2.40
14	1	Anne-Sophie Loretan	Switzerland	1:00.95	+2.51
15	19	Carmen Haro	France	1:01.01	+2.57
16	10	Sandra Absmann	Austria	1:01.02	+2.58
17	23	Alexandra Bauer	Sweden	1:01.04	+2.60
18	18	Nina Lea Bertsch	Switzerland	1:01.09	+2.65
19	53	Ekaterina Tkachenko	Russia	1:01.27	+2.83
20	15	Katarzyna Wasek	Poland	1:01.42	+2.98
21	11	Jessica Albertin	Switzerland	1:01.49	+3.05
22	39	Petra Hromcová	Slovakia	1:01.55	+3.11
23	37	Petra Smaldore	Italy	1:01.58	+3.14
24	42	Elise Guilbert	France	1:01.59	+3.15
25	21	Zuzanna Czapska	Poland	1:01.81	+3.37
26	17	Sofia Krokhina	Russia	1:01.88	+3.44
27	14	Martina Nobis	Italy	1:01.93	+3.49
28	43	Laurence Huot	Canada	1:01.97	+3.53
29	20	Nora Schweizer	Switzerland	1:02.00	+3.56
30	47	Lea Chapuis	France	1:02.01	+3.57
31	51	Yoko Ishijima	Japan	1:02.06	+3.62
32	49	Nanoha Matsumoto	Japan	1:02.18	+3.74
33	36	Kenza Lacheb	France	1:02.19	+3.75
34	29	Olivia Wenk	Germany	1:02.23	+3.79
35	28	Victoria Bolješić	Serbia	1:02.31	+3.87
36	46	Liene Bondare	Latvia	1:02.33	+3.89
37	54	Marie Desrosiers	Canada	1:02.35	+3.91
38	24	Tanja Intlekofer	Germany	1:02.37	+3.93
39	34	Nikola Bubáková	Czech Republic	1:02.40	+3.96
40	31	Lana Zbasnik	Croatia	1:02.44	+4.00
41	33	Perrine Clair	France	1:02.76	+4.32
42	32	Viola Sertorelli	Italy	1:03.04	+4.60
43	27	Tereza Zahálková	Czech Republic	1:03.28	+4.84
44	40	Noh Jin-soul	South Korea	1:03.30	+4.86
45	35	Katrin Don	Slovenia	1:03.49	+5.05
46	52	Sabrina Cormier	Canada	1:03.51	+5.07
47	45	Arata Wakatsuki	Japan	1:03.77	+5.33
48	38	Mariya Grigorova	Kazakhstan	1:04.29	+5.85
49	44	Adrienne Poitras	Canada	1:04.57	+6.13
50	48	Han Ji-hye	South Korea	1:05.01	+6.57
51	50	Evelyn Hrehorová	Slovakia	1:05.12	+6.68
52	41	Louise Van den Bosch	Belgium	1:05.15	+6.71
53	55	Lisa Anette Vaher	Estonia	1:05.32	+6.88
	12	Daria Krajewska	Poland	Did not start	
	26	Zofia Zdort	Poland	Did not start	
