= Atefeh Ahmadi =

Iranian alpine skier (born 2000)

Personal information
- Born: 23 December 2000 (age 25) Tehran, Iran
Medal record
Women's alpine skiing
Representing Iran
Asian Championships
Silver medal – second place	2018 Darbandsar	Super-G
Silver medal – second place	2022 Mzaar	Slalom
Silver medal – second place	2022 Mzaar	Giant slalom

Atefeh Ahmadi (Persian: عاطفه احمدی; born 23 December 2000) is an alpine skier from Iran. She is a silver medalist in the Super-G event of the 2018 Asian Alpine Ski Championships.

Her father was a member of the Iranian national cross-country skiing team. He also became the first coach for Atefa and her sister Hadis.

She has been performing at the adult level since 2017; the next season, she won her first gold in the National Championship, held in Darbandsar. In the giant slalom competition, Ahmadi defeated her more experienced rivals Forough Abbasi and Marjan Kalhor.

She qualified for the 2022 Winter Olympics. She competed at the 2022 Winter Olympics in Beijing. She was the only woman from Iran to take part and was Iran's flag bearer. In January 2023, she applied for asylum in Germany. Officially, she had travelled to Europe to prepare for the World Championships in France in February.

In December 2023, Ahmadi became the first FIS Athlete to gain Refugee status.

In December 2025, Ahmadi posted in her Instagram account that she has returned to Iran. The German Olympic Sports Confederation, which supported her integration with a scholarship, stated they did not know anything about her return to Iran.
