= Iran at the 2026 Winter Olympics =

- Flag of Iran
- IOC code: IRI
- NOC: National Olympic Committee of the Islamic Republic of Iran
- Website: www.olympic.ir (in Persian and English)

in Milan and Cortina d'Ampezzo, Italy 6 February 2026 – 22 February 2026
- Competitors: 4 (2 men and 2 women) in 2 sports
- Flag bearers (opening): Danyal Saveh Shemshaki & Samaneh Beyrami Baher
- Flag bearer (closing): Sadaf Saveh Shemshaki
- Medals: Gold 0 Silver 0 Bronze 0 Total 0

Winter Olympics appearances (overview)
- 1956; 1960; 1964; 1968; 1972; 1976; 1980–1994; 1998; 2002; 2006; 2010; 2014; 2018; 2022; 2026

Iran (officially called the Islamic Republic of Iran) competed at the 2026 Winter Olympics in Milan and Cortina d'Ampezzo, Italy, from 6 to 22 February 2026.

Iran's team consisted of four athletes (two per gender) competing in two sports.

Cross-country skiers Danyal Saveh Shemshaki and Samaneh Beyrami Baher were the country's flagbearer during the opening ceremony. Meanwhile, Sadaf Saveh Shemshaki was the country's flagbearer during the closing ceremony.

Following the 2026 Iran massacres amid the 2025–2026 Iranian protests, activists called on the IOC to ban the Iranian team from the 2026 Winter Olympics.

== Competitors ==
The following is the list of number of competitors participating at the Games per sport/discipline.

Sport	Men	Women	Total
Alpine skiing	1	1	2
Cross-country skiing	1	1	2
Total	2	2	4

== Alpine skiing ==
Iran qualified one female and one male alpine skier through the basic quota.

Athlete	Event	Run 1		Run 2		Total	
Athlete	Event	Time	Rank	Time	Rank	Time	Rank
Mohammad Kiyadarbandsari	Men's giant slalom	1:29.14	64	1:22.03	61	2:51.17	61
Mohammad Kiyadarbandsari	Men's slalom	1:09.49	36	1:07.28	30	2:16.77	33
Sadaf Saveh Shemshaki	Women's slalom	1:06.64	64	1:11.95	53	2:18.59	53

== Cross-country skiing ==
Iran qualified one female and one male cross-country skier through the basic quota.

Distance

Athlete	Event	Final		
Athlete	Event	Time	Deficit	Rank
Danyal Saveh Shemshaki	Men's 10 km freestyle	26:30.8	+5:54.6	93
Samaneh Beyrami Baher	Women's 10 km freestyle	30:49.9	+8:00.7	98

== See also ==
- Iran at the 2026 Winter Paralympics
