= National Olympic Academy of Iran =

National Olympic and Paralympic Academy of Iran (Persian: آکادمی ملی المپیک و پارالمپیک ایران) is a sporting academy situated in Tehran, Iran. It concerns the matters related to the Olympics and Paralympics.

== See also ==
- National Olympic Committee of Iran
