= Iran at the 2002 Winter Olympics =

- IOC code: IRI
- NOC: National Olympic Committee of the Islamic Republic of Iran
- Website: www.olympic.ir (in Persian and English)

in Salt Lake City
- Competitors: 2 in 1 sport
- Flag bearer: Bagher Kalhor
- Medals Ranked —th: Gold 0 Silver 0 Bronze 0 Total 0

Winter Olympics appearances (overview)
- 1956; 1960; 1964; 1968; 1972; 1976; 1980–1994; 1998; 2002; 2006; 2010; 2014; 2018; 2022; 2026; 2030

Iran participated in the 2002 Winter Olympics in Salt Lake City, United States. Two athletes represented Iran in the 2002 Olympics, one in alpine skiing and one in cross-country skiing.

== Competitors ==
Sport	Men	Women	Total
Skiing, Alpine	1		1
Skiing, Cross-country	1		1
Total	2	0	2

== Results by event ==
=== Skiing ===
==== Alpine ====
Men

Athlete	Event	1st run	2nd run	Total	Rank
Bagher Kalhor	Slalom	DNF	—	—	—

==== Cross-country ====
Men

Athlete	Event	10 km classical		10 km free		
Athlete	Event	Time	Rank	Time	Total	Rank
Mostafa Mirhashemi	20 km pursuit	34:42.7	79	Did not advance		
