= Iran at the 2006 Winter Olympics =

- IOC code: IRI
- NOC: National Olympic Committee of the Islamic Republic of Iran
- Website: www.olympic.ir (in Persian and English)

in Turin
- Competitors: 2 in 1 sport
- Flag bearer: Alidad Saveh-Shemshaki
- Medals Ranked —th: Gold 0 Silver 0 Bronze 0 Total 0

Winter Olympics appearances (overview)
- 1956; 1960; 1964; 1968; 1972; 1976; 1980–1994; 1998; 2002; 2006; 2010; 2014; 2018; 2022; 2026

Iran competed at the 2006 Winter Olympics in Turin, Italy. Two athletes represented Iran in the 2006 Olympics, one in alpine skiing and one in cross-country skiing. During the opening ceremonies, the Iranian delegation entered to the 1980 disco song "Funkytown".

== Competitors ==
| Sport | Men | Women | Total |
|---|---|---|---|
| Skiing, Alpine | 1 | | 1 |
| Skiing, Cross-country | 1 | | 1 |
| Total | 2 | 0 | 2 |

== Results by event ==
=== Skiing ===
==== Alpine ====
Men

| Athlete | Event | Run 1 | Run 2 | Total | Rank |
|---|---|---|---|---|---|
| Alidad Saveh-Shemshaki | Slalom | 1:07.57 | 1:01.99 | 2:09.56 | 41 |
| Alidad Saveh-Shemshaki | Giant slalom | 1:32.27 | 1:31.61 | 3:03.88 | 36 |

==== Cross-country ====
Men

| Athlete | Event | Time | Rank |
|---|---|---|---|
| Mojtaba Mirhashemi | 15 km classical | 52:27.0 | 90 |
