= Hossein Saveh Shemshaki =

Iranian alpine skier (born 1985)

Personal information
- Native name: حسین ساوه شمشکی
- National team: Iran
- Citizenship: Iranian
- Born: 5 August 1985 (age 40) Tehran, Iran
- Education: Industrial Management
- Years active: 2002–present
- Height: 183 cm (6 ft 0 in)

Sport
- Country: Iran
- Sport: Alpine skiing slalom Giant slalom

Achievements and titles
- Highest world ranking: 2010 Vancouver Winter Olympics - 41st; 2014 Sochi Winter Olympics - 31st
Medal record
Men's alpine skiing
Representing Iran
Event	1st	2nd	3rd
2015 Asian Championships	1	1	0
2018 Asian Championships	0	0	2
Total	1	1	2
Asian Championships
Gold medal – first place	2015 South Korea	Slalom
Silver medal – second place	2015 South Korea	Giant slalom
Bronze medal – third place	2018 Iran	Slalom
Bronze medal – third place	2018 Iran	Alpine combined

Hossein Saveh Shemshaki (Persian: حسین ساوه شمشكی, born 5 August 1985, in Tehran) is an alpine skier from Iran. He competed for Iran at the 2010 Winter Olympics, where his best result was 41st place in the slalom, and at the 2014 Winter Olympics.

He was chosen as Iran's Flag Bearer for the 2014 Sochi Winter Olympics and 2017 Sapporo Asian Winter Games.

One of the best performances of Saveh Shemshaki in international competitions was winning a gold medal in the slalom and a silver medal in the giant slalom at the 2015 Asian Alpine Ski Championships.

In February 2022, Saveh Shemshaki became the first athlete to provide a positive test for doping at the 2022 Winter Olympics. and subsequently suspended from competing, training, coaching or participating in any activity during the Olympic Winter Games Beijing 2022 per the ITA.

== Winter Olympics and Asian Cups results ==
Competition	Host city	Year	Age	Slalom	Giant Slalom	Super-G	Downhill	Combined
Asian Winter Games	(China) Changchun	2007	21	9	11	—	—	—
Winter Olympics	(Canada) Vancouver	2010	24	41	70	—	—	—
Asian Winter Games	(Kazakhstan) Astana & Almaty	2011	25	—	—	4	4	4
Winter Olympics	(Russia) Sochi	2014	28	31	55	—	—	—
Asian Alpine Championship	(South Korea) Yongpyong	2015	29	1	2	—	—	—
Asian Winter Games	(Japan) Sapporo	2017	31	5	10	—	—	—
Asian Alpine Championship	(Iran) Darbandsar	2018	32	3	—	—	—	3
