= Badminton at the Summer Olympics =

- IOC Code: BDM
- Governing body: BWF
- Events: 5 (men: 2; women: 2; mixed: 1)

Summer Olympics
- 1896; 1900; 1904; 1908; 1912; 1920; 1924; 1928; 1932; 1936; 1948; 1952; 1956; 1960; 1964; 1968; 1972; 1976; 1980; 1984; 1988; 1992; 1996; 2000; 2004; 2008; 2012; 2016; 2020; 2024; 2028; 2032; Note: demonstration or exhibition sport years indicated in italics
- Medalists

Badminton had its debut as an official event on the 1992 Summer Olympics and has been contested in nine Olympiads. 74 different nations have appeared in the Olympic badminton competitions, with 17 appearing all nine times. It is governed by the Badminton World Federation.

== Summary ==
Games	Year	Events	Best nation
XX	1972	4	Indonesia (1)
XXIV	1988	5	South Korea (1)
XXV	1992	4	Indonesia (2)
XXVI	1996	5	South Korea (2)
XXVII	2000	5	China (1)
XXVIII	2004	5	China (2)
XXIX	2008	5	China (3)
XXX	2012	5	China (4)
XXXI	2016	5	China (5)
XXXII	2020	5	China (6)
XXXIII	2024	5	China (7)
XXXIV	2028	5	
XXXV	2032	5	

== History ==
The 1972 Summer Olympics saw the inaugural staging of badminton, as a demonstration sport. Two decades later, after a successful exhibition at the 1988 games, the sport was officially introduced to the Olympics in 1989, and debuted in competition at the 1992 Games where 4 events were held, with singles and doubles events for both men and women. Four medals were awarded in each event, including two bronzes. At the following Games in 1996, had 5 events with the addition of mixed doubles. Since 1996 there is a playoff between the two semi-final losers to determine the sole winner of the bronze medal. This format has continued to 2024 Olympics.

== Events ==
(d) = demonstration event
(e) = exhibition event

Current program
Event	72	88	92	96	00	04	08	12	16	20	24	28
Men's singles	(d)	(e)	X	X	X	X	X	X	X	X	X	X
Men's doubles	(d)	(e)	X	X	X	X	X	X	X	X	X	X
Women's singles	(d)	(e)	X	X	X	X	X	X	X	X	X	X
Women's doubles		(e)	X	X	X	X	X	X	X	X	X	X
Mixed doubles	(d)	(e)		X	X	X	X	X	X	X	X	X
Events	4	5	4	5	5	5	5	5	5	5	5	5

== Medal table ==
As of the 2024 edition

Rank	Nation	Gold	Silver	Bronze	Total
1	China	22	15	15	52
2	Indonesia	8	6	8	22
3	South Korea	7	8	7	22
4	Denmark	3	3	4	10
5	Chinese Taipei	2	1	0	3
6	Japan	1	1	4	6
7	Spain	1	0	0	1
8	Malaysia	0	6	5	11
9	Great Britain	0	1	2	3
9	India	0	1	2	3
11	Netherlands	0	1	0	1
11	Thailand	0	1	0	1
13	Russia	0	0	1	1
Totals (13 entries)		**44**	**44**	**48**	**136**

=== Successful national teams ===
Below is the gold medalists showed based on category and countries after the 2024 Summer Olympics. China has been successfully dominating the Summer Olympics, it is the only country ever to achieve a shutout of the medals, which they did at the 2012 Summer Olympics. Indonesia is the second most successful country in Badminton sports after China at the Olympics event. China and Indonesia are the only countries that have ever won gold medals in every badminton discipline. Bolded numbers below indicate a country as the overall winner of Olympic badminton of that year.

As of the 2024 Olympics

Rank	Country	92	96	00	04	08	12	16	20	24	28	Total
1	China		1	**4**	**3**	**3**	**5**	**2**	**2**	**2**		22
2	Indonesia	**2**	1	1	1	1		1	1			8
3	South Korea	2	**2**		1	1				1		7
4	Denmark		1						1	1		3
5	Chinese Taipei								1	1		2
6	Japan							1				1
6	Spain							1				1

== Medals by event ==
=== Men's singles ===
As of 2024 Olympics

Rank	Nation	Gold	Silver	Bronze	Total
1	China	4	2	3	9
2	Denmark	3	0	2	5
3	Indonesia	2	2	3	7
4	Malaysia	0	3	2	5
5	South Korea	0	1	0	1
5	Thailand	0	1	0	1
Totals (6 entries)		9	9	10	28

=== Women's singles ===
As of 2024 Olympics

Rank	Nation	Gold	Silver	Bronze	Total
1	China	5	3	4	12
2	South Korea	2	1	0	3
3	Indonesia	1	1	3	5
4	Spain	1	0	0	1
5	India	0	1	2	3
6	Chinese Taipei	0	1	0	1
6	Denmark	0	1	0	1
6	Netherlands	0	1	0	1
9	Japan	0	0	1	1
Totals (9 entries)		9	9	10	28

=== Men's doubles ===
As of 2024 Olympics

Rank	Nation	Gold	Silver	Bronze	Total
1	Indonesia	3	1	2	6
2	China	2	3	1	6
3	South Korea	2	2	3	7
4	Chinese Taipei	2	0	0	2
5	Malaysia	0	2	3	5
6	Denmark	0	1	0	1
7	Great Britain	0	0	1	1
Totals (7 entries)		9	9	10	28

=== Women's doubles ===
As of 2024 Olympics

Rank	Nation	Gold	Silver	Bronze	Total
1	China	6	5	4	15
2	South Korea	1	2	4	7
3	Japan	1	1	1	3
4	Indonesia	1	0	0	1
5	Denmark	0	1	0	1
6	Russia	0	0	1	1
Totals (6 entries)		9	9	10	28

=== Mixed doubles ===
As of 2024 Olympics

Rank	Nation	Gold	Silver	Bronze	Total
1	China	5	2	3	10
2	South Korea	2	2	0	4
3	Indonesia	1	2	0	3
4	Great Britain	0	1	1	2
5	Malaysia	0	1	0	1
6	Denmark	0	0	2	2
6	Japan	0	0	2	2
Totals (7 entries)		8	8	8	24

== Qualification ==
The Badminton World Federation's ranking list is used to determine qualification for the Olympic tournament. For singles, around 40 competitors are selected. For doubles, 16 pairs are selected.

The general method of selection is by ranking. Each National Olympic Committee can send a maximum of two players/pairs if both players/pairs are within the top 16 on the singles rankings or top 8 on the doubles rankings. Below that, each NOC can send a maximum of one player/pair.

Each of the five continental confederations will be guaranteed at least two entries in each singles and at least one entry in each doubles event (this is called the Continental Representation Place system). If this has not been satisfied by the entry selection method described above, the highest ranked player or pair from the respective continent will qualify. An NOC can qualify players or pairs in a maximum of two events through the Continental Representation Place system; if a NOC qualifies for more than two events through the Continental Representation Place system, the NOC must choose which of them are qualified, and the quota place declined will be offered to the next NOC's eligible player or pair.

The host nation reserves one spot in each of the men's and women's singles events. If one or more players from the host nation qualify directly, their slots will be reallocated to the next highest-ranked eligible player.

== Competition ==
Olympic badminton consists of a group stage and single-elimination tournament. Each match is played to the best of three games. Games are up to 21 points. Rally scoring is used, meaning a player does not need to be serving to score. A player must win by two points or be the first player to 30 points.

== Participating nations ==
The following nations have taken part in the badminton competition. The numbers in the table indicate the number of competitors sent to that year's Olympics.

Event	96	00	04	08	12	20	24	28	32	36	48	52	56	60	64	68	72	76	80	84	88	92	96	00	04	08	12	16	20	24	Years
Algeria																										1				2	2
Australia																						2	8	7	6	6	5	5	4	3	9
Austria																						2	1				2	2	1	1	6
Azerbaijan																													1	2	2
Belarus																							2			1	1				3
Belgium																						1		1			2	2	1	2	6
Brazil																												2	2	2	3
Brunei																												1			1
Bulgaria																						7	3	4	2	1	1	3	3	3	9
Canada																						6	7	6	7	4	4	2	8	4	9
China																						13	20	17	19	19	17	14	14	16	9
Chinese Taipei																							6	5	5	4	8	4	5	6	8
Cuba																												1			1
Czech Republic																										2	2	2		4	4
Czechoslovakia																						2									1
Denmark																						12	16	18	12	10	9	8	9	7	9
Egypt																										1	1		3		3
El Salvador																														1	1
Estonia																										2	1	2	2	1	5
Finland																						2	2	2	3	2	2	1	1	1	9
France																						4	2	3	3	2	2	2	4	9	9
Germany																						4	6	6	6	5	6	7	5	4	9
Great Britain																						12	11	12	11	6	4	8	7	3	9
Greece																									2						1
Guatemala																							1		1	1	1	1	2	1	7
Hong Kong																						5	3	4	5	3	4	7	4	6	9
Hungary																						3	1					1	2		4
Iceland																						3	1			1	1				4
India																						3	2	2	3	2	5	7	4	7	9
Indonesia																						13	20	19	14	11	9	10	11	9	9
Iran																										1			1		2
Ireland																								1		2	2	2	1	2	6
Israel																											1	1	2	1	4
Italy																										1	1	1		1	4
Jamaica																									1						1
Japan																						11	7	9	11	10	11	9	13	12	9
Kazakhstan																														1	1
Lithuania																										2	1				2
Malaysia																						6	7	6	9	9	6	8	8	8	9
Maldives																											1		1	1	3
Malta																													1		1
Mauritius																						3	4	5		1		1	1	1	7
Mexico																										1	1	1	2	1	5
Myanmar																													1	1	2
Nepal																														1	1
Netherlands																						3	5	8	4		1	3	4	2	8
New Zealand																						4	2		2	3					4
Nigeria																							2			1		3	1		4
Norway																						1			1		1				3
Pakistan																													1		1
Peru																							1		1	1	2		1	1	6
Philippines																							1								1
Poland																						6	1	3	3	5	6	5			7
Portugal																						2		1	1	2	2	2			6
Refugee Olympic Team																													1	1	2
Romania																						1									1
Russia																							5	3	2	2	6	4			6
Republic of China																													4		1
Seychelles																										2					1
Singapore																						3	1		3	5	4	2	2	4	8
Slovakia																										1	1		1		3
Slovenia																								1		1	1				3
South Africa																						2			6	5	4	1		1	6
South Korea																						12	17	12	15	13	12	14	10	12	9
Spain																						2			2	2	2	2	2	2	7
Sri Lanka																						1				1	2	1	1	1	6
Suriname																							1				1	1		1	4
Sweden																						8	10	6	3	1	1	1	1		8
Switzerland																						2	2			2	1	1	1	2	7
Thailand																						8	7	6	8	4	6	7	7	9	9
Trinidad and Tobago																							1								1
Turkey																											1	1	1	1	4
Uganda																										1	1				2
Ukraine																							3	3		2	2	2	2	1	7
Unified Team																						2									1
United States																						6	3	1	2	5	3	7	4	7	9
Vietnam																										2	1	2	2	2	5
Zambia																										1					1
Year	96	00	04	08	12	20	24	28	32	36	48	52	56	60	64	68	72	76	80	84	88	92	96	00	04	08	12	16	20	24	Years

== See also ==
- Badminton at the Summer Paralympics
- List of Olympic venues in badminton
