= Iran at the 2014 Winter Olympics =

- IOC code: IRI
- NOC: National Olympic Committee of the Islamic Republic of Iran
- Website: www.olympic.ir (in Persian and English)

in Sochi
- Competitors: 5 in 2 sports
- Flag bearers: Hossein Saveh Shemshaki (opening); Mohammad Kiyadarbandsari (closing)
- Medals: Gold 0 Silver 0 Bronze 0 Total 0

Winter Olympics appearances (overview)
- 1956; 1960; 1964; 1968; 1972; 1976; 1980–1994; 1998; 2002; 2006; 2010; 2014; 2018; 2022; 2026

Iran competed at the 2014 Winter Olympics in Sochi, Russia from 7 to 23 February 2014. Iran's team consisted of five athletes in two sports, representing the largest ever Iranian team at the Winter Olympics.

The 2014 Games marked the first time an Iranian Olympic team competed in Russia, as Iran and 64 western countries took part at the American-led boycott in the 1980 Summer Olympics held in Moscow due to the Soviet–Afghan War.

== Alpine skiing ==
According to the final quota allocation released on January 20, 2014, Iran had three athletes in qualification position.

Athlete	Event	Run 1		Run 2		Total	
Athlete	Event	Time	Rank	Time	Rank	Time	Rank
Mohammad Kiyadarbandsari	Men's giant slalom	1:30.12	56	1:32.01	52	3:02.13	51
Mohammad Kiyadarbandsari	Men's slalom	55.09	55	1:03.78	29	1:58.87	30
Hossein Saveh Shemshaki	Men's giant slalom	1:32.35	62	1:32.87	55	3:05.22	55
Hossein Saveh Shemshaki	Men's slalom	55.46	57	1:03.90	30	1:59.36	31
Forough Abbasi	Women's slalom	1:26.71	60	1:08.98	46	2:35.69	48

== Cross-country skiing ==
According to the final quota allocation released on January 20, 2014, Iran had two athletes in qualification position. For the first time ever Iran also qualified a female cross-country skier.

Distance

Athlete	Event	Final		
Athlete	Event	Time	Deficit	Rank
Sattar Seid	Men's 15 km classical	47:16.1	+8:46.4	79
Farzaneh Rezasoltani	Women's 10 km classical	42:31.3	+14:13.5	70

== See also ==
- Iran at the 2014 Summer Youth Olympics
- Iran at the 2014 Winter Paralympics
