= Iran at the 1998 Winter Olympics =

- IOC code: IRI
- NOC: National Olympic Committee of the Islamic Republic of Iran
- Website: www.olympic.ir (in Persian and English)

in Nagano
- Competitors: 1 in 1 sport
- Flag bearer: Hassan Shemshaki
- Medals: Gold 0 Silver 0 Bronze 0 Total 0

Winter Olympics appearances (overview)
- 1956; 1960; 1964; 1968; 1972; 1976; 1980–1994; 1998; 2002; 2006; 2010; 2014; 2018; 2022; 2026

Iran was represented at the 1998 Winter Olympics in Nagano, Japan by the National Olympic Committee of the Islamic Republic of Iran.

In total, one athlete represented Iran: Hassan Shemshaki in the alpine skiing men's slalom.

== Background ==
It had been 22 years since Iran had last competed at the Winter Olympics. The country sent four athletes to the 1976 Winter Olympics in Innsbruck, Austria but did not compete at any of the subsequent five games. Prior to their 22 year hiatus, Iran had competed regularly at the Winter Olympics after making their debut at the 1956 Winter Olympics in Cortina d'Ampezzo, Italy. Between 1956 and 1976, the country only missed one Olympics – the 1960 Winter Olympics in Squaw Valley, California, United States. They had not won any medals at any previous Winter Olympics.

== Competitors ==
In total, one athlete represented Iran at the 1998 Winter Olympics in Nagano, Japan in one sport.

Sport	Men	Women	Total
Alpine skiing	1	0	1
Total	1	0	1

== Alpine skiing ==
In total, one Iranian athlete participated in the alpine skiing events – Hassan Shemshaki in the men's slalom.

The alpine skiing events took place from 10 to 21 February 1998. The speed events were held at the Hakuba Happoone Winter Resort in Hakuba, Nagano Prefecture and the technical events were held at Shiga Kogen in Yamanouchi, Nagano Prefecture.

The men's slalom took place on 21 February 1998. Shemshaki completed his first run in a time of one minute 13.59 seconds. He completed his second run in a time of one minute 13.4 seconds for a total time of two minutes 26.99 seconds to finish 30th overall.

Athlete	Event	Run 1	Run 2	Total	Rank
Hassan Shemshaki	Slalom	1:13.59	1:13.40	2:26.99	30
