= Iran at the Olympics =

- IOC code: IRI
- NOC: National Olympic Committee of the Islamic Republic of Iran
- Website: www.olympic.ir (in Persian and English)
- Medals Ranked 39th: Gold 27 Silver 29 Bronze 32 Total 88

Summer appearances
- 1900; 1904–1936; 1948; 1952; 1956; 1960; 1964; 1968; 1972; 1976; 1980–1984; 1988; 1992; 1996; 2000; 2004; 2008; 2012; 2016; 2020; 2024

Winter appearances
- 1956; 1960; 1964; 1968; 1972; 1976; 1980–1994; 1998; 2002; 2006; 2010; 2014; 2018; 2022; 2026

Iran, formerly known as Persia before 1935 and officially the Islamic Republic of Iran since 1979, first participated in the Olympic Games in 1900. Iran has sent athletes to compete in every Summer Olympic Games since 1948, except for 1980 and 1984 due to political boycotts. Iran has also participated in the Winter Olympic Games on several occasions since 1956.

Iran has participated in 19 Summer Olympics and 13 Winter Olympics so far. Iran participated in 9 Summer Olympics and gained 4 gold medals before the 1979 Revolution, and participated in 10 Summer Olympics and won 23 gold medals after the revolution.

Freydoun Malkom, a fencer who competed in the épée event at the 1900 Summer Olympics, was the first Iranian Olympic competitor. Jafar Salmasi won Iran's first Olympic medal in 1948, and Kimia Alizadeh was the first Iranian female Olympic medalist, having done so in 2016. Iranian athletes have won a total of 88 Summer Olympic medals, all in wrestling, weightlifting, taekwondo, athletics, shooting, and karate. Iran's National Olympic Committee was founded in 1947.

== Medal tables ==
Former logo of the National Olympic Committee of Iran (Before the Iranian Revolution of 1979)

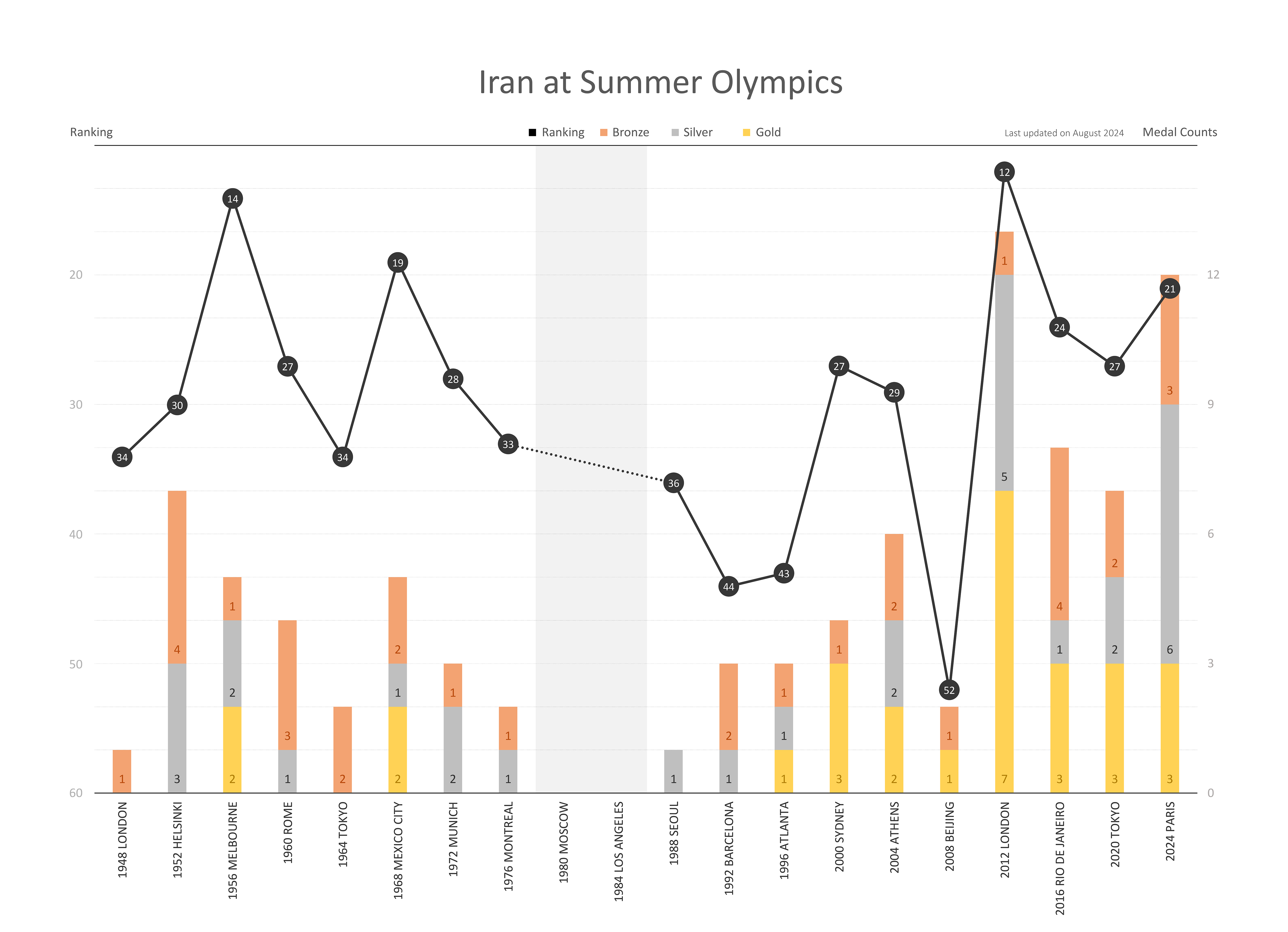
Iran at Summer Olympic Games

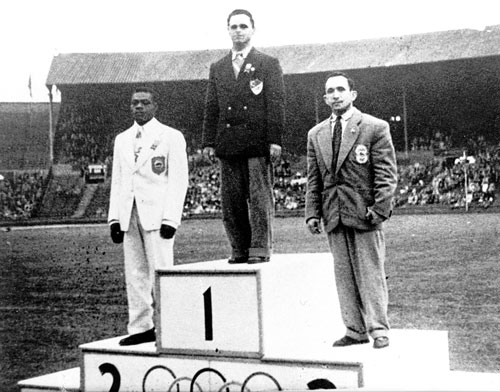
The first olympic medal for Iran, Jafar Salmasi

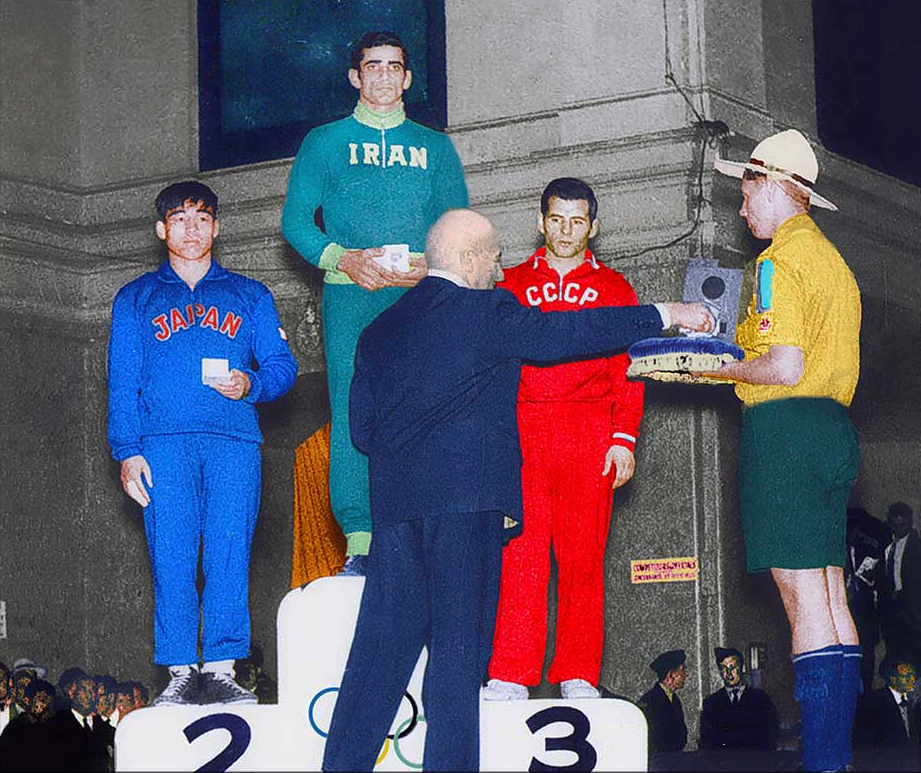
Emam-Ali Habibi, 1956 Melbourne

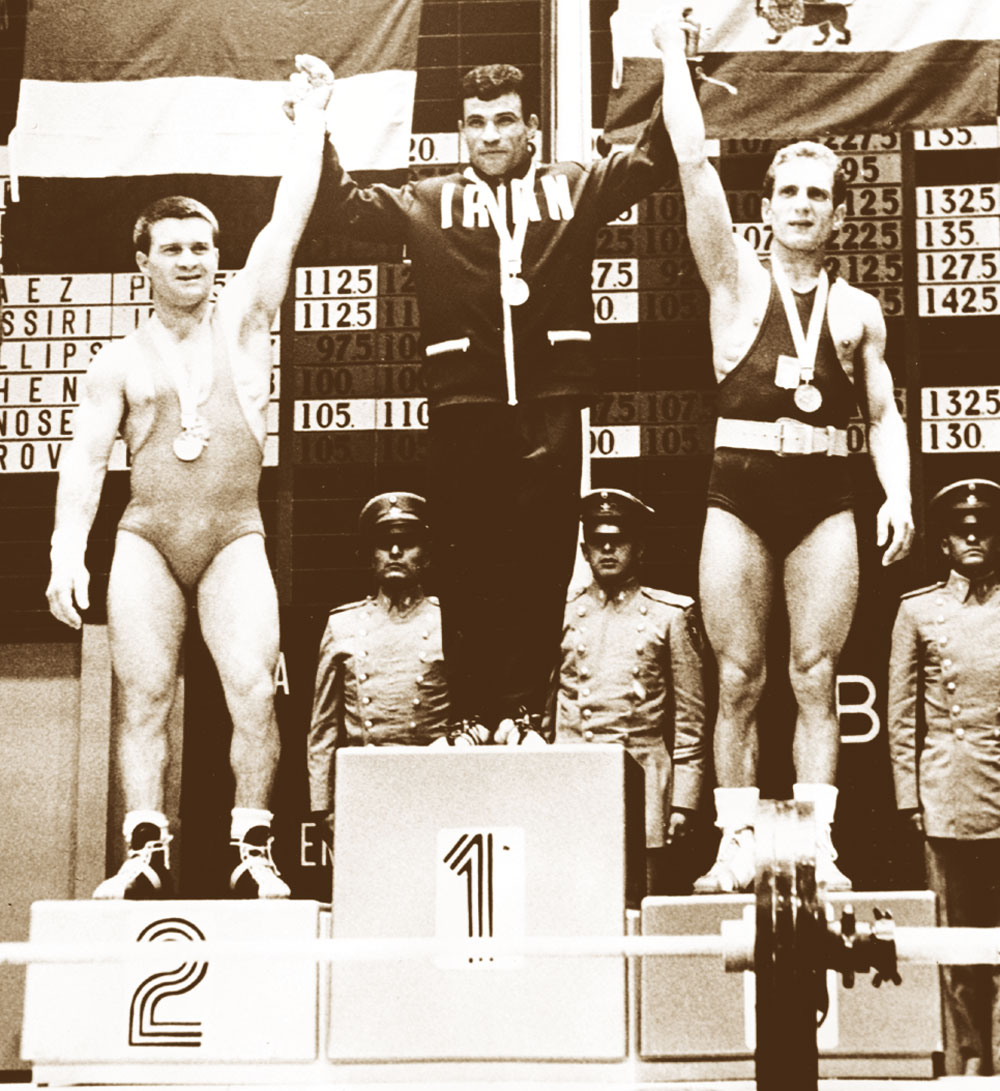
Mohammad Nassiri, 1968 Mexico City

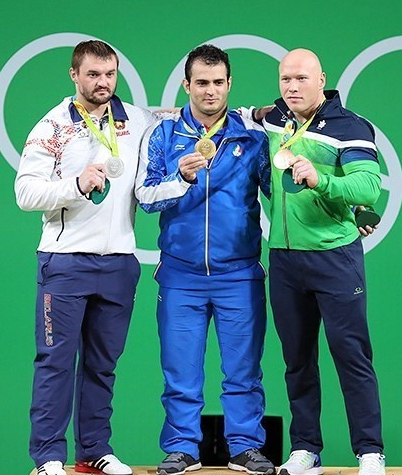
Sohrab Moradi, 2016 Summer Olympics

=== Medals by Summer Games ===
Games	Athletes	Gold	Silver	Bronze	Total	Rank
(French Third Republic) 1900 Paris	1	0	0	0	0	–
1904–1936	did not participate					
(United Kingdom) 1948 London	36	0	0	1	1	34
(Finland) 1952 Helsinki	22	0	3	4	7	30
(Australia) 1956 Melbourne	17	2	2	1	5	14
(Italy) 1960 Rome	25	0	1	3	4	27
(Japan) 1964 Tokyo	63	0	0	2	2	34
1968 Mexico City	14	2	1	2	5	19
(West Germany) 1972 Munich	50	0	2	1	3	28
(Canada) 1976 Montreal	86	0	1	1	2	33
(Soviet Union) 1980 Moscow	did not participate					
(United States) 1984 Los Angeles	did not participate					
(South Korea) 1988 Seoul	27	0	1	0	1	36
(Spain) 1992 Barcelona	40	0	1	2	3	44
(United States) 1996 Atlanta	18	1	1	1	3	43
(Australia) 2000 Sydney	35	3	0	1	4	27
(Greece) 2004 Athens	38	2	2	2	6	29
(China) 2008 Beijing	55	1	0	1	2	52
(United Kingdom) 2012 London	53	7	5	1	13	12
(Brazil) 2016 Rio de Janeiro	63	3	1	4	8	24
(Japan) 2020 Tokyo	65	3	2	2	7	27
(France) 2024 Paris	41	3	6	3	12	21
(United States) 2028 Los Angeles	future event					
(Australia) 2032 Brisbane	future event					
Total (19/30)	749	27	29	32	88	39

=== Medals by Winter Games ===
Games	Athletes	Gold	Silver	Bronze	Total	Rank
(Italy) 1956 Cortina d'Ampezzo	4	0	0	0	0	–
(United States) 1960 Squaw Valley	did not participate					
(Austria) 1964 Innsbruck	4	0	0	0	0	–
(France) 1968 Grenoble	4	0	0	0	0	–
(Japan) 1972 Sapporo	4	0	0	0	0	–
(Austria) 1976 Innsbruck	4	0	0	0	0	–
1980–1994	did not participate					
(Japan) 1998 Nagano	1	0	0	0	0	–
(United States) 2002 Salt Lake City	2	0	0	0	0	–
(Italy) 2006 Turin	2	0	0	0	0	–
(Canada) 2010 Vancouver	4	0	0	0	0	–
(Russia) 2014 Sochi	5	0	0	0	0	–
(South Korea) 2018 Pyeongchang	4	0	0	0	0	–
(China) 2022 Beijing	3	0	0	0	0	–
(Italy) 2026 Milano Cortina	4	0	0	0	0	–
(France) 2030 French Alps	future event					
(United States) 2034 Utah	future event					
Total (13/25)	45	0	0	0	0	–

=== Medals by summer sport ===
Sport	Gold	Silver	Bronze	Total
Wrestling	13	19	23	55
Weightlifting	9	6	5	20
Taekwondo	3	3	4	10
Shooting	1	0	0	1
Karate	1	0	0	1
Athletics	0	1	0	1
Total (6)	27	29	32	88

== List of medalists ==
Medal	Name	Games	Sport	Event	Date
Bronze	Jafar Salmasi	1948 London	Weightlifting	Men's 60 kg	9 August 1948
Silver	Gholamreza Takhti	1952 Helsinki	Wrestling	Men's freestyle 79 kg	23 July 1952
Silver	Nasser Givehchi	1952 Helsinki	Wrestling	Men's freestyle 62 kg	23 July 1952
Silver	Mahmoud Namjoo	1952 Helsinki	Weightlifting	Men's 56 kg	25 July 1952
Bronze	Mahmoud Mollaghasemi	1952 Helsinki	Wrestling	Men's freestyle 52 kg	23 July 1952
Bronze	Abdollah Mojtabavi	1952 Helsinki	Wrestling	Men's freestyle 73 kg	23 July 1952
Bronze	Tofigh Jahanbakht	1952 Helsinki	Wrestling	Men's freestyle 67 kg	23 July 1952
Bronze	Ali Mirzaei	1952 Helsinki	Weightlifting	Men's 56 kg	25 July 1952
Gold	Emam-Ali Habibi	1956 Melbourne	Wrestling	Men's freestyle 67 kg	1 December 1956
Gold	Gholamreza Takhti	1956 Melbourne	Wrestling	Men's freestyle 87 kg	1 December 1956
Silver	Mehdi Yaghoubi	1956 Melbourne	Wrestling	Men's freestyle 57 kg	1 December 1956
Silver	Mohammad Ali Khojastehpour	1956 Melbourne	Wrestling	Men's freestyle 52 kg	1 December 1956
Bronze	Mahmoud Namjoo	1956 Melbourne	Weightlifting	Men's 56 kg	23 November 1956
Silver	Gholamreza Takhti	1960 Rome	Wrestling	Men's freestyle 87 kg	6 September 1960
Bronze	Mohammad Paziraei	1960 Rome	Wrestling	Men's Greco-Roman 52 kg	31 August 1960
Bronze	Ebrahim Seifpour	1960 Rome	Wrestling	Men's freestyle 52 kg	6 September 1960
Bronze	Esmaeil Elmkhah	1960 Rome	Weightlifting	Men's 56 kg	7 September 1960
Bronze	Ali Akbar Heidari	1964 Tokyo	Wrestling	Men's freestyle 52 kg	14 October 1964
Bronze	Mohammad Ali Sanatkaran	1964 Tokyo	Wrestling	Men's freestyle 78 kg	14 October 1964
Gold	Mohammad Nassiri	1968 Mexico City	Weightlifting	Men's 56 kg	13 October 1968
Gold	Abdollah Movahed	1968 Mexico City	Wrestling	Men's freestyle 70 kg	20 October 1968
Silver	Parviz Jalayer	1968 Mexico City	Weightlifting	Men's 67.5 kg	15 October 1968
Bronze	Aboutaleb Talebi	1968 Mexico City	Wrestling	Men's freestyle 57 kg	20 October 1968
Bronze	Shamseddin Seyed-Abbasi	1968 Mexico City	Wrestling	Men's freestyle 63 kg	20 October 1968
Silver	Mohammad Nassiri	1972 Munich	Weightlifting	Men's 56 kg	28 August 1972
Silver	Rahim Aliabadi	1972 Munich	Wrestling	Men's Greco-Roman 48 kg	10 September 1972
Bronze	Ebrahim Javadi	1972 Munich	Wrestling	Men's freestyle 48 kg	31 August 1972
Silver	Mansour Barzegar	1976 Montreal	Wrestling	Men's freestyle 74 kg	31 July 1976
Bronze	Mohammad Nassiri	1976 Montreal	Weightlifting	Men's 52 kg	18 July 1976
Silver	Askari Mohammadian	1988 Seoul	Wrestling	Men's freestyle 57 kg	1 October 1988
Silver	Askari Mohammadian	1992 Barcelona	Wrestling	Men's freestyle 62 kg	7 August 1992
Bronze	Amir Reza Khadem	1992 Barcelona	Wrestling	Men's freestyle 74 kg	6 August 1992
Bronze	Rasoul Khadem	1992 Barcelona	Wrestling	Men's freestyle 82 kg	7 August 1992
Gold	Rasoul Khadem	1996 Atlanta	Wrestling	Men's freestyle 90 kg	2 August 1996
Silver	Abbas Jadidi	1996 Atlanta	Wrestling	Men's freestyle 100 kg	31 July 1996
Bronze	Amir Reza Khadem	1996 Atlanta	Wrestling	Men's freestyle 82 kg	31 July 1996
Gold	Hossein Tavakkoli	2000 Sydney	Weightlifting	Men's 105 kg	25 September 2000
Gold	Hossein Rezazadeh	2000 Sydney	Weightlifting	Men's +105 kg	26 September 2000
Gold	Alireza Dabir	2000 Sydney	Wrestling	Men's freestyle 58 kg	1 October 2000
Bronze	Hadi Saei	2000 Sydney	Taekwondo	Men's 68 kg	28 September 2000
Gold	Hossein Rezazadeh	2004 Athens	Weightlifting	Men's +105 kg	25 August 2004
Gold	Hadi Saei	2004 Athens	Taekwondo	Men's 68 kg	27 August 2004
Silver	Alireza Rezaei	2004 Athens	Wrestling	Men's freestyle 120 kg	28 August 2004
Silver	Masoud Mostafa-Jokar	2004 Athens	Wrestling	Men's freestyle 60 kg	29 August 2004
Bronze	Yousef Karami	2004 Athens	Taekwondo	Men's 80 kg	28 August 2004
Bronze	Alireza Heidari	2004 Athens	Wrestling	Men's freestyle 96 kg	29 August 2004
Gold	Hadi Saei	2008 Beijing	Taekwondo	Men's 80 kg	22 August 2008
Bronze	Morad Mohammadi	2008 Beijing	Wrestling	Men's freestyle 60 kg	19 August 2008
Gold	Saeid Mohammadpour	2012 London	Weightlifting	Men's 94 kg	4 August 2012^{[b]}
Gold	Hamid Sourian	2012 London	Wrestling	Men's Greco-Roman 55 kg	5 August 2012
Gold	Omid Norouzi	2012 London	Wrestling	Men's Greco-Roman 60 kg	6 August 2012
Gold	Navab Nassirshalal	2012 London	Weightlifting	Men's 105 kg	6 August 2012^{[d]}
Gold	Ghasem Rezaei	2012 London	Wrestling	Men's Greco-Roman 96 kg	7 August 2012
Gold	Behdad Salimi	2012 London	Weightlifting	Men's +105 kg	7 August 2012
Gold	Komeil Ghasemi	2012 London	Wrestling	Men's freestyle 120 kg	11 August 2012^{[c]}
Silver	Kianoush Rostami	2012 London	Weightlifting	Men's 85 kg	3 August 2012^{[a]}
Silver	Sajjad Anoushiravani	2012 London	Weightlifting	Men's +105 kg	7 August 2012
Silver	Ehsan Haddadi	2012 London	Athletics	Men's discus throw	7 August 2012
Silver	Mohammad Bagheri Motamed	2012 London	Taekwondo	Men's 68 kg	9 August 2012
Silver	Sadegh Goudarzi	2012 London	Wrestling	Men's freestyle 74 kg	10 August 2012
Bronze	Ehsan Lashgari	2012 London	Wrestling	Men's freestyle 84 kg	11 August 2012
Gold	Kianoush Rostami	2016 Rio de Janeiro	Weightlifting	Men's 85 kg	12 August 2016
Gold	Sohrab Moradi	2016 Rio de Janeiro	Weightlifting	Men's 94 kg	13 August 2016
Gold	Hassan Yazdani	2016 Rio de Janeiro	Wrestling	Men's freestyle 74 kg	19 August 2016
Silver	Komeil Ghasemi	2016 Rio de Janeiro	Wrestling	Men's freestyle 125 kg	20 August 2016
Bronze	Saeid Abdevali	2016 Rio de Janeiro	Wrestling	Men's Greco-Roman 75 kg	14 August 2016
Bronze	Ghasem Rezaei	2016 Rio de Janeiro	Wrestling	Men's Greco-Roman 98 kg	16 August 2016
Bronze	Kimia Alizadeh	2016 Rio de Janeiro	Taekwondo	Women's 57 kg	18 August 2016
Bronze	Hassan Rahimi	2016 Rio de Janeiro	Wrestling	Men's freestyle 57 kg	19 August 2016
Gold	Javad Foroughi	2020 Tokyo	Shooting	Men's 10 m air pistol	24 July 2021
Gold	Mohammad Reza Geraei	2020 Tokyo	Wrestling	Men's Greco-Roman 67 kg	4 August 2021
Gold	Sajjad Ganjzadeh	2020 Tokyo	Karate	Men's kumite +75 kg	7 August 2021
Silver	Ali Davoudi	2020 Tokyo	Weightlifting	Men's +109 kg	4 August 2021
Silver	Hassan Yazdani	2020 Tokyo	Wrestling	Men's freestyle 86 kg	5 August 2021
Bronze	Mohammad Hadi Saravi	2020 Tokyo	Wrestling	Men's Greco-Roman 97 kg	3 August 2021
Bronze	Amir Hossein Zare	2020 Tokyo	Wrestling	Men's freestyle 125 kg	6 August 2021
Gold	Mohammad Hadi Saravi	2024 Paris	Wrestling	Men's Greco-Roman −97 kg	7 August 2024
Gold	Saeid Esmaeili	2024 Paris	Wrestling	Men's Greco-Roman −67 kg	8 August 2024
Gold	Arian Salimi	2024 Paris	Taekwondo	Men's +80 kg	10 August 2024
Silver	Alireza Mohmadi	2024 Paris	Wrestling	Men's Greco-Roman −87 kg	8 August 2024
Silver	Nahid Kiani	2024 Paris	Taekwondo	Women's 57 kg	8 August 2024
Silver	Hassan Yazdani	2024 Paris	Wrestling	Men's freestyle 86 kg	9 August 2024
Silver	Mehran Barkhordari	2024 Paris	Taekwondo	Men's 80 kg	9 August 2024
Silver	Amir Hossein Zare	2024 Paris	Wrestling	Men's freestyle 125 kg	10 August 2024
Silver	Rahman Amouzad	2024 Paris	Wrestling	Men's freestyle 65 kg	11 August 2024
Bronze	Amin Mirzazadeh	2024 Paris	Wrestling	Men's Greco-Roman 130 kg	6 August 2024
Bronze	Mobina Nematzadeh	2024 Paris	Taekwondo	Women's 49 kg	7 August 2024
Bronze	Amir Ali Azarpira	2024 Paris	Wrestling	Men's 97 kg	11 August 2024

- ^{a} Kianoush Rostami originally won the bronze medal, but was upgraded to silver on 26 November 2016 after the original silver medalist tested positive for doping.
- ^{b} Saeid Mohammadpour originally finished 5th, but was upgraded to the gold medal position on 20 December 2016 since the top four weightlifters tested positive for doping.
- ^{c} Komeil Ghasemi originally won the bronze medal, but was upgraded to gold on 26 July 2019 after the original gold and silver medalists tested positive for doping.
- ^{d} Navab Nassirshalal originally won the silver medal, but was upgraded to gold on 19 December 2019 after the original gold medalist tested positive for doping.

== Athletes with most medals ==
- Athletes in **bold** are still active with Iran.

#	Athlete	Sport	Games	Gold medal	Silver medal	Bronze medal	Total
1	Hadi Saei	Taekwondo	2000–2008	2	0	1	3
2	Hossein Rezazadeh	Weightlifting	2000–2004	2	0	0	2
3	Gholamreza Takhti	Wrestling	1952–1964	1	2	0	3
3	**Hassan Yazdani**	Wrestling	2016–2024	1	2	0	3
5	Mohammad Nassiri	Weightlifting	1968–1976	1	1	1	3
6	Komeil Ghasemi	Wrestling	2012–2016	1	1	0	2
6	Kianoush Rostami	Weightlifting	2012–2016	1	1	0	2
8	Rasoul Khadem	Wrestling	1992–1996	1	0	1	2
8	Ghasem Rezaei	Wrestling	2012–2016	1	0	1	2
8	**Mohammad Hadi Saravi**	Wrestling	2020–2024	1	0	1	2
11	Askari Mohammadian	Wrestling	1988–1992	0	2	0	2
12	Mahmoud Namjoo	Weightlifting	1952–1956	0	1	1	2
12	**Amir Hossein Zare**	Wrestling	2020–2024	0	1	1	2
14	Amir Reza Khadem	Wrestling	1992–1996	0	0	2	2

== Sport by year ==
=== Summer Olympics ===
Sport	00	48	52	56	60	64	68	72	76	88	92	96	00	04	08	12	16	20	24	Years
Aquatics, Diving						1														1
Aquatics, Swimming						1						1	1	1	1	1	1	1	1	9
Aquatics, Water polo									11											1
Archery															2	2	1	1	1	5
Athletics			1	2	1	8	1	3	4	1	2	1	1	2	6	10	10	3	2	17
Badminton															1			1		2
Basketball		13													12			12		3
Boxing		8	6		4	5		5	6		6	4	5	1	3	4	1	2		14
Canoeing, Sprint													1			2	1	1	2	5
Cycling, Road						4		4	7	7	7		2	2	3	3	3	1	1	12
Cycling, Track								4	7	7	7			2						5
Equestrian													1							1
Fencing	1					4		2	13							1	2	4	4	8
Football						17		19	17											3
Gymnastics, Artistic						2													1	2
Judo												1	3	7	6	1	2			6
Karate																		3		1
Rowing															2	2	1	1	3	5
Shooting		3			1	4			4			1	1	1		3	5	6	4	11
Sport climbing																			1	1
Table tennis											1		1	1	1	2	3	1	3	8
Taekwondo										4	3		2	2	3	3	4	3	4	7
Volleyball																	12	12		2
Weightlifting		5	7	7	5	5	4	3	7		5		6	6	3	6	5	2	2	16
Wrestling		7	8	8	12	12	9	14	17	15	16	10	11	13	12	13	12	11	12	18
Total	1	36	22	17	23	63	14	50	86	27	40	18	35	38	55	53	63	65	41	19

=== Winter Olympics ===
Sport	56	64	68	72	76	98	02	06	10	14	18	22	26	Years	
Sport	Alpine skiing	3	4	4	4	4	1	1	1	3	3	2	1	2	13
Cross-country skiing							1	1	1	2	2	1	2	7	
Total	3	4	4	4	4	1	2	2	4	5	4	2	4	11	

== See also ==
- List of flag bearers for Iran at the Olympics
- Category:Olympic competitors for Iran
- Iran at the Paralympics
- Iran at the Asian Games
