= 2022 Asian Alpine Ski Championships =

The 2022 Asian Alpine Ski Championships were the 30th Asian Alpine Ski Championships and took place from February 24–26, 2022, in Mzaar Kfardebian, Lebanon.

== Medal summary ==
=== Men ===
Event	Gold	Silver	Bronze
Slalom	Komiljon Tukhtaev; Uzbekistan	Mohammad Saveh-Shemshaki; Iran	Cesar Arnouk; Lebanon
Giant slalom	Zakhar Kuchin; Kazakhstan	Komiljon Tukhtaev; Uzbekistan	Mohammad Saveh-Shemshaki; Iran

=== Women ===
Event	Gold	Silver	Bronze
Slalom	Manon Ouaiss; Lebanon	Atefeh Ahmadi; Iran	Carlie Iskandar; Lebanon
Giant slalom	Manon Ouaiss; Lebanon	Atefeh Ahmadi; Iran	Alexandra Troitskaya; Kazakhstan

== Medal table ==
Rank	Nation	Gold	Silver	Bronze	Total
1	Lebanon	2	0	2	4
2	Uzbekistan	1	1	0	2
3	Kazakhstan	1	0	1	2
4	Iran	0	3	1	4
Totals (4 entries)		4	4	4	12
