= Iran at the 1956 Winter Olympics =

- IOC code: IRI (IRN used at these Games)
- NOC: National Olympic Committee of Iran
- Website: www.olympic.ir (in Persian and English)

in Cortina d'Ampezzo
- Competitors: 3 in 1 sport
- Flag bearer: Simon Farzami
- Medals: Gold 0 Silver 0 Bronze 0 Total 0

Winter Olympics appearances (overview)
- 1956; 1960; 1964; 1968; 1972; 1976; 1980–1994; 1998; 2002; 2006; 2010; 2014; 2018; 2022; 2026

Iran competed at the Winter Olympic Games for the first time at the 1956 Winter Olympics in Cortina d'Ampezzo, Italy. Three athletes and four officials represented Iran in the 1956 Olympics.

== Competitors ==
Sport	Men	Women	Total
Skiing, Alpine	3		3
Total	3	0	3

== Results by event ==
=== Skiing ===
==== Alpine ====
Men

Athlete	Event	Run 1	Run 2	Total	Rank
Benik Amirian	Slalom	DSQ	—	—	—
Benik Amirian	Giant slalom	Disqualified			
Benik Amirian	Downhill	5:02.7			44
Reza Bazargan	Slalom	DSQ	—	—	—
Reza Bazargan	Giant slalom	4:15.0			75
Reza Bazargan	Downhill	Disqualified			
Mahmoud Beigloo	Slalom	2:56.7	2:54.6	5:51.3	55
Mahmoud Beigloo	Giant slalom	4:43.9			82
Mahmoud Beigloo	Downhill	4:22.0			39
