= List of Olympic venues in badminton =

For the Summer Olympics, 13 venues have been or will be used in badminton.

Games	Venue	Other sports hosted at venue for games	Capacity	Ref.
1972 Munich	Volleyballhalle (demonstration)	Volleyball	3,675	
1988 Seoul	Seoul National University Gymnasium (demonstration)	Table tennis	5,000	
1992 Barcelona	Pavelló de la Mar Bella	None	4,000	
1996 Atlanta	Georgia State University Gymnasium	None	3,500	
2000 Sydney	Pavilion 3, Sydney Olympic Park	Gymnastics (rhythmic)	6,000	
2004 Athens	Goudi Olympic Hall	None	8,000	
2008 Beijing	Beijing University of Technology Gymnasium	Gymnastics (rhythmic)	7,500	
2012 London	Wembley Arena	Gymnastics (rhythmic)	6,000	
2016 Rio de Janeiro	Riocentro – Pavilion 4	None	6,500	
2020 Tokyo	Musashino Forest Sport Plaza	Modern pentathlon (fencing)	7,200	
2024 Paris	Porte de La Chapelle Arena	Gymnastics (rhythmic)	8,000	
2028 Los Angeles	USC Sports Center	Gymnastics (rhythmic)	10,258	
2032 Brisbane	Brisbane Convention & Exhibition Centre	Fencing, Taekwondo, Table Tennis	6,000	

== Gallery of venues ==
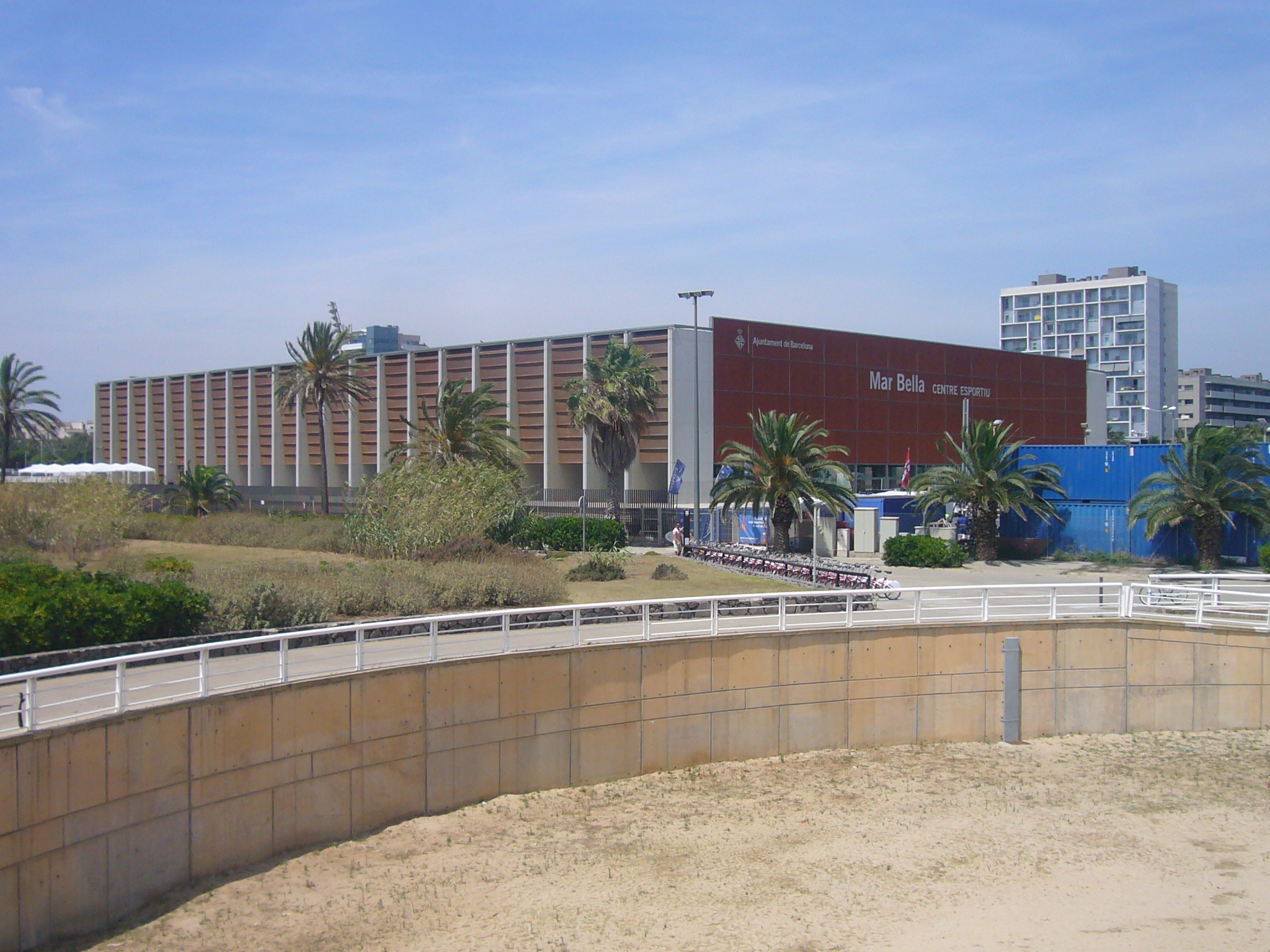
Mar Bella hosted the badminton events for the 1992 Summer Olympics in Barcelona.

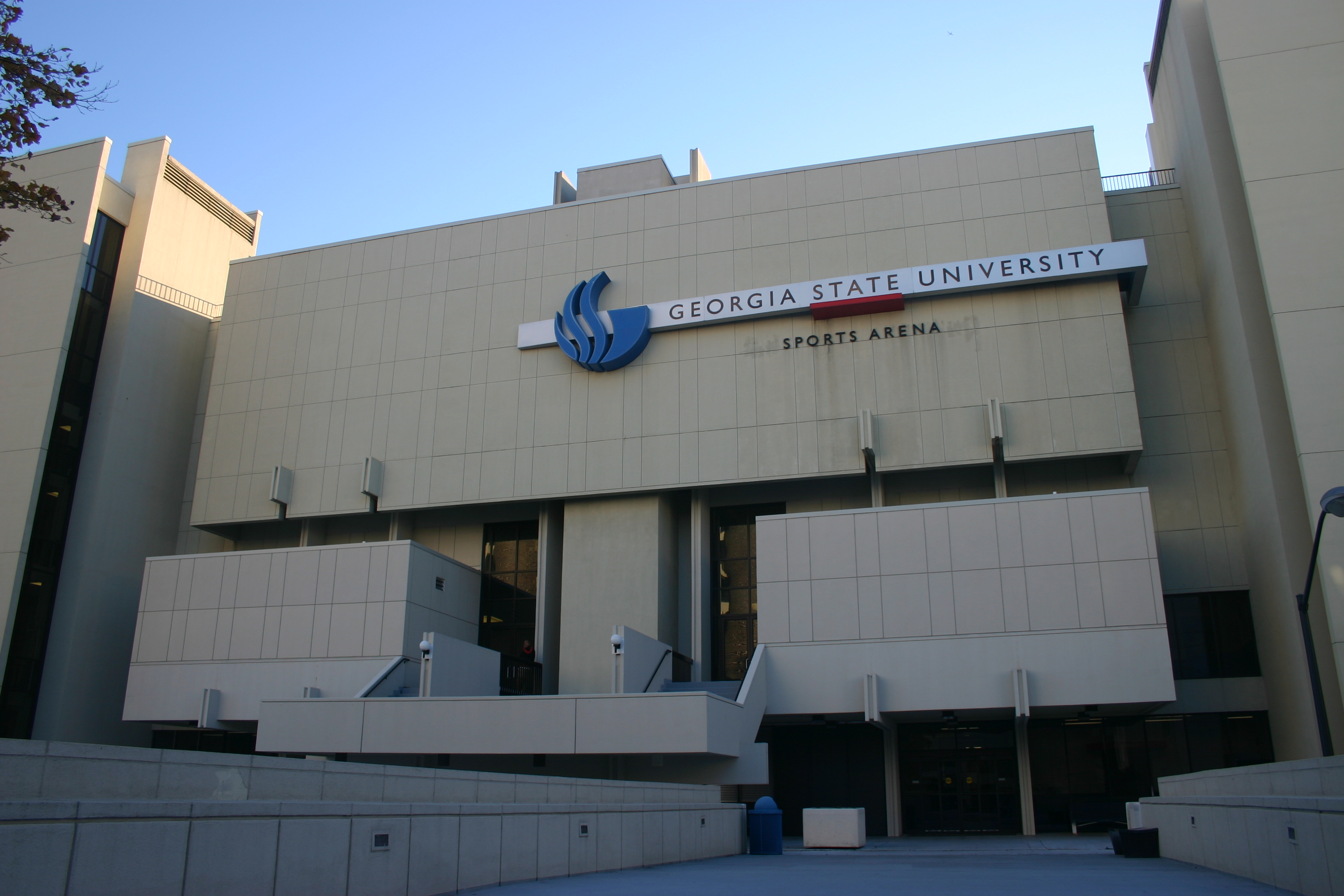
The GSU Sports Arena hosted badminton at the 1996 Summer Olympics in Atlanta.

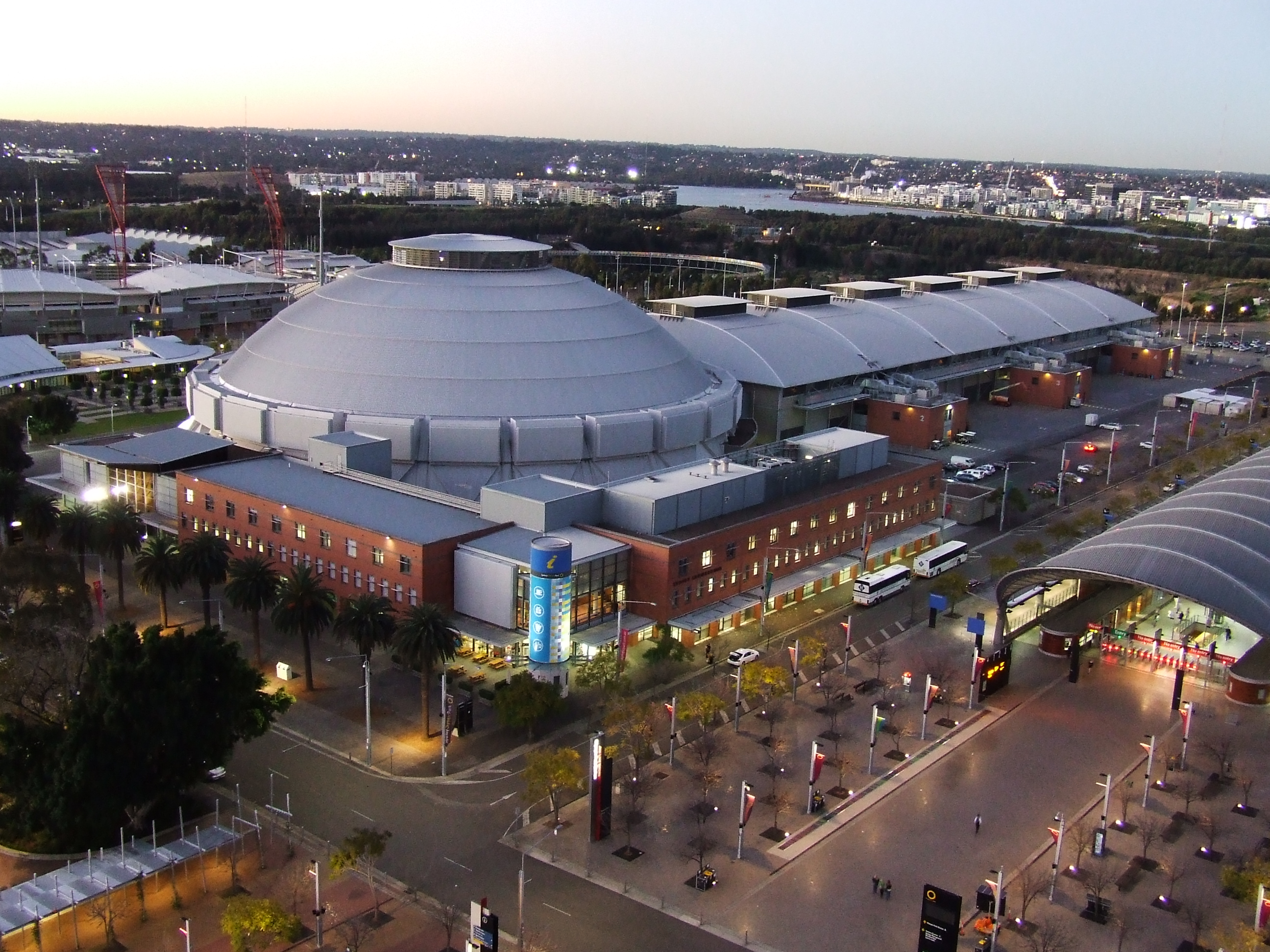
The Dome at the Sydney Olympic Park hosted badminton at the 2000 Summer Olympics.

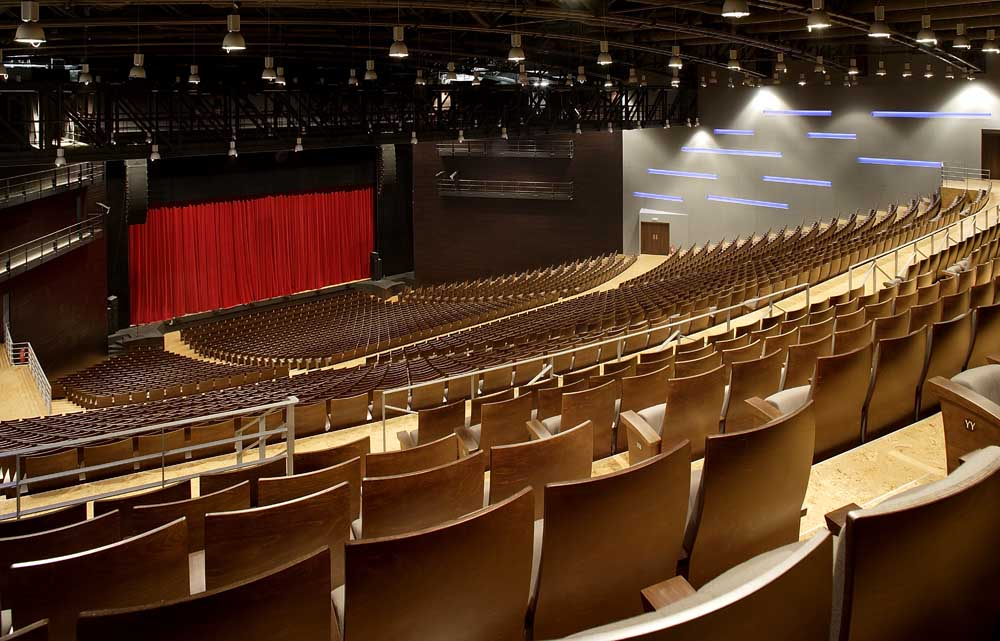
The Badminton Theater hosted badminton at the 2004 Summer Olympics in Athens.

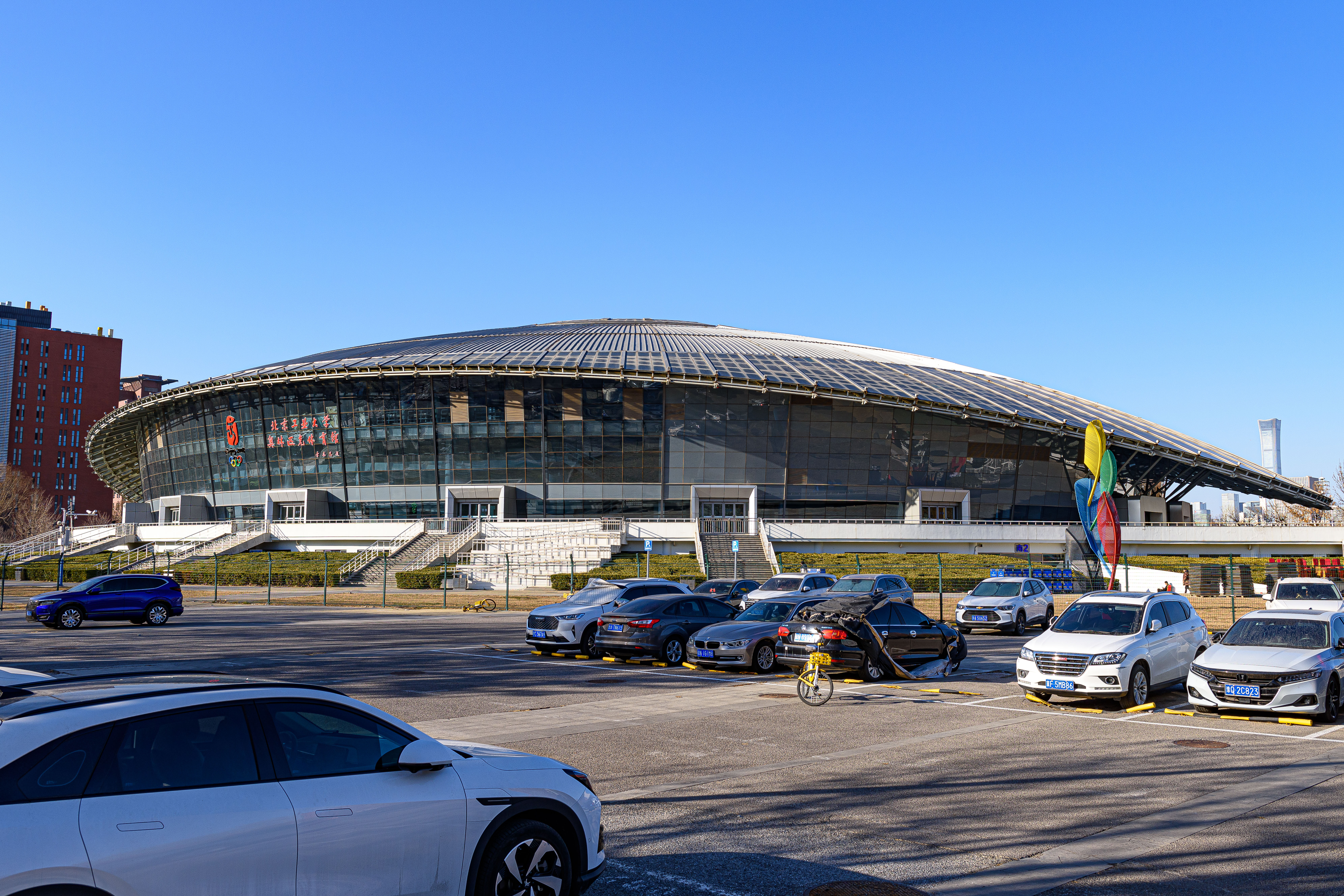
The Beijing University of Technology Gymnasium hosted badminton at the 2008 Summer Olympics.

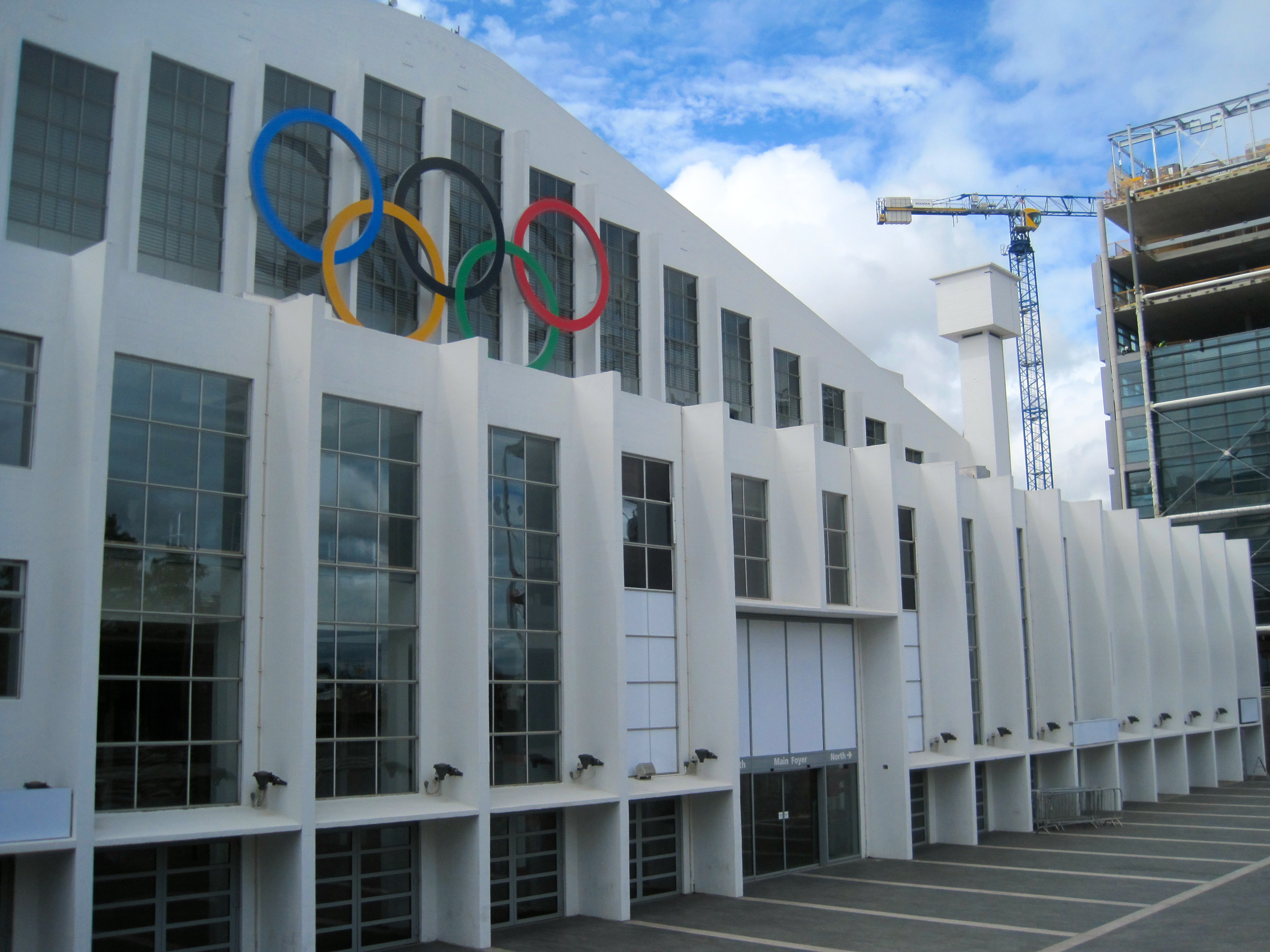
Wembley Arena hosted badminton at the 2012 Summer Olympics in London.

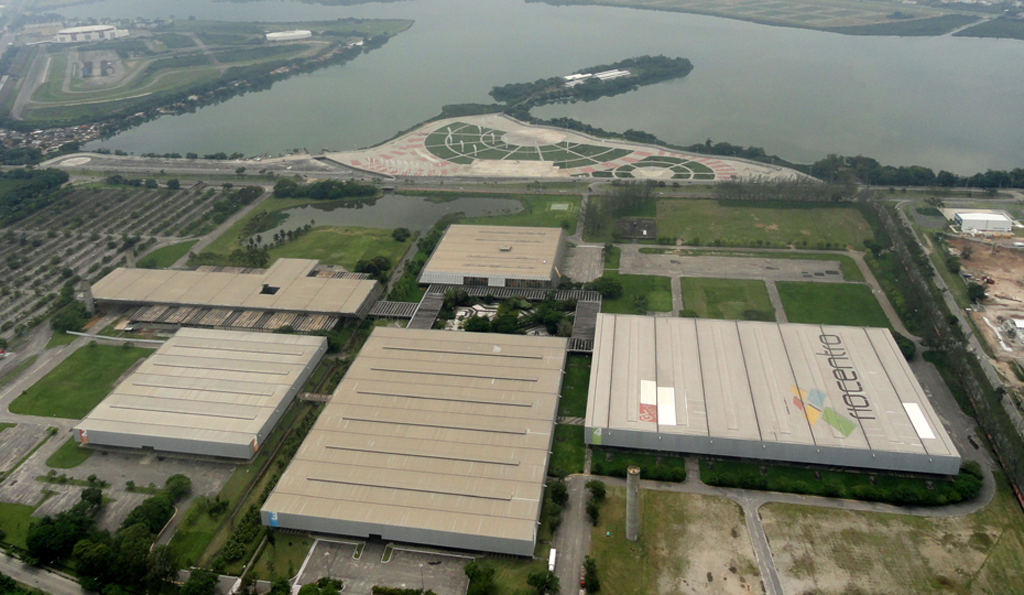
Riocento hosted badminton at the 2016 Summer Olympics in Rio de Janeiro.

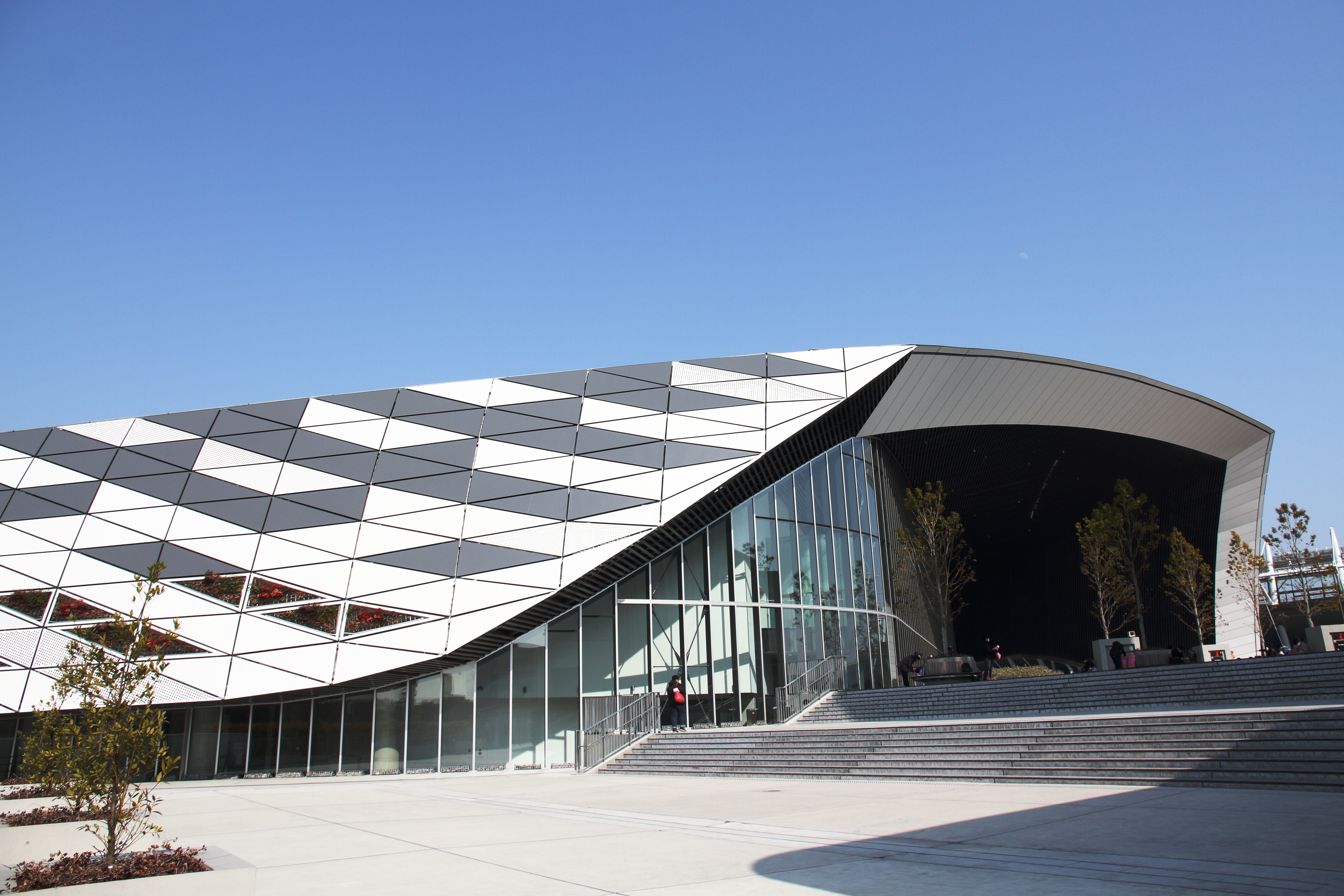
The Musashino Forest Sport Plaza hosted badminton at the 2020 Summer Olympics in Tokyo.

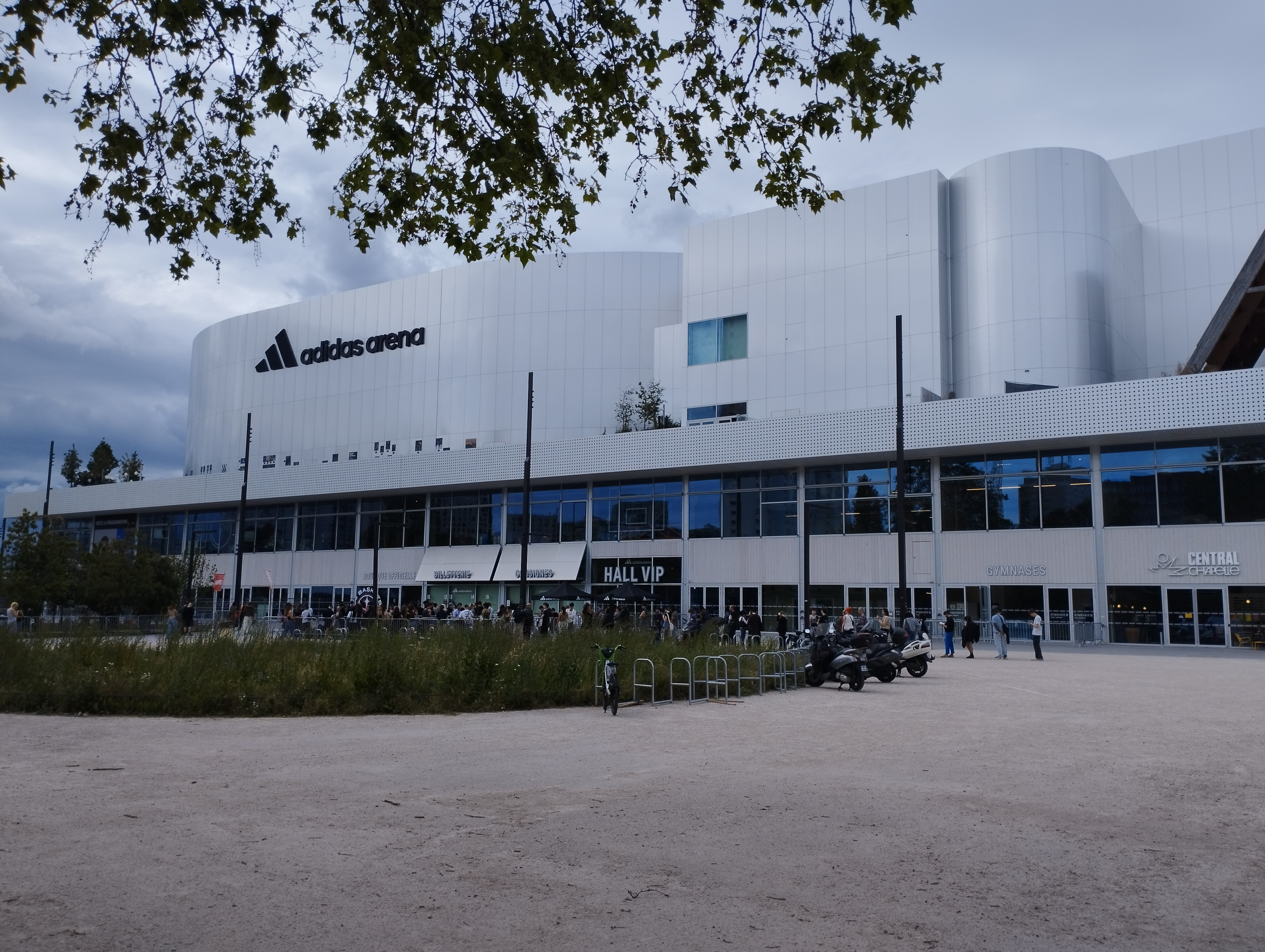
The Adidas Arena hosted badminton at the 2024 Summer Olympics in Paris.

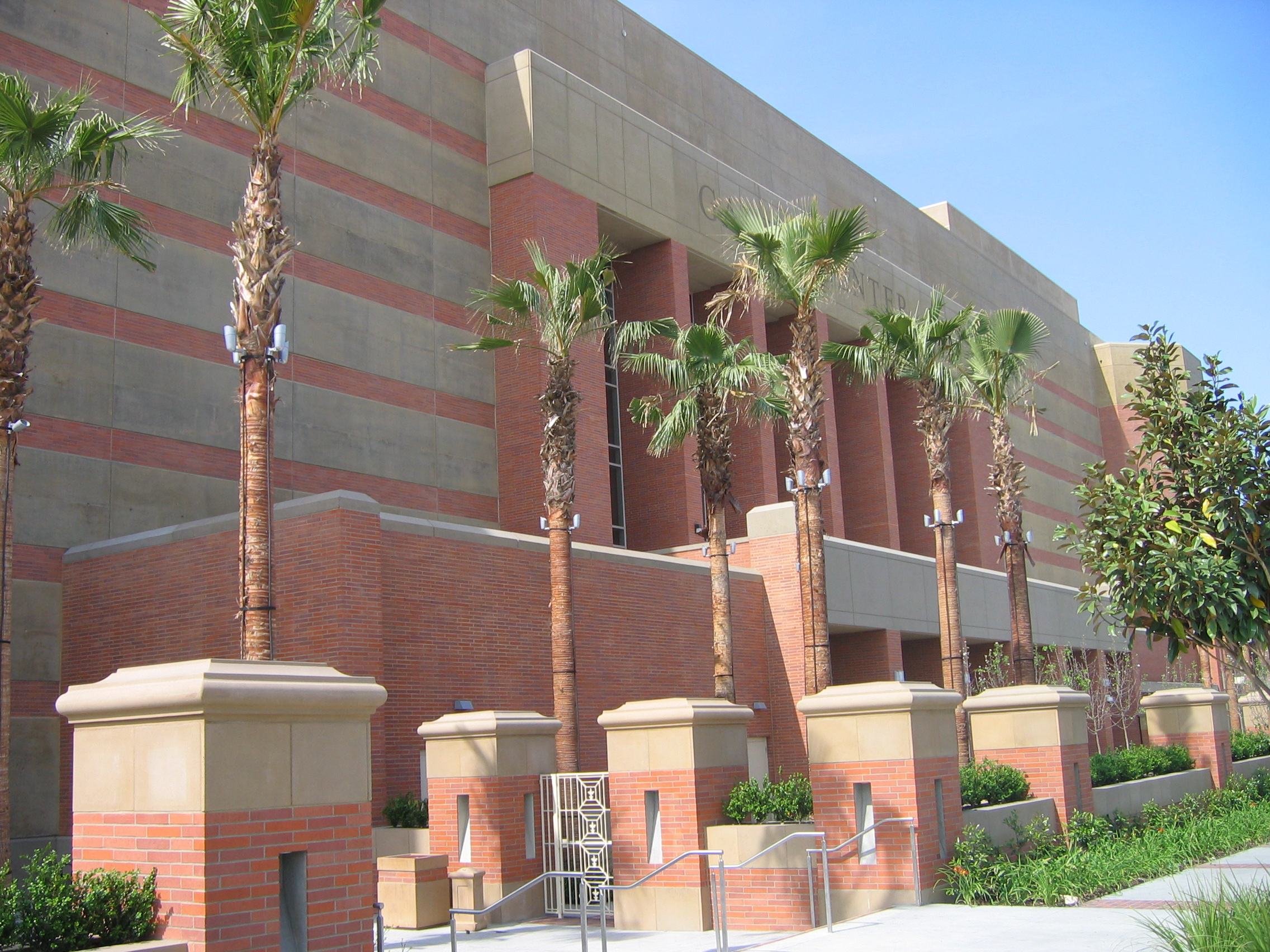
The Galen Center will host badminton at the 2028 Summer Olympics in Los Angeles.
