= Iran at the 2010 Winter Olympics =

- IOC code: IRI
- NOC: National Olympic Committee of the Islamic Republic of Iran
- Website: www.olympic.ir (in Persian and English)

in Vancouver
- Competitors: 4 in 1 sport
- Flag bearer: Marjan Kalhor
- Medals Ranked —th: Gold 0 Silver 0 Bronze 0 Total 0

Winter Olympics appearances (overview)
- 1956; 1960; 1964; 1968; 1972; 1976; 1980–1994; 1998; 2002; 2006; 2010; 2014; 2018; 2022; 2026

Iran participated in the 2010 Winter Olympics in Vancouver, British Columbia, Canada. Four athletes represented Iran in the 2010 Olympics, three in alpine skiing and one in cross-country skiing. Marjan Kalhor was the first woman to represent Iran at the Winter Olympics.

== Background ==
Iran has not won a medal at the Winter Olympics.

== Results by event ==
=== Skiing ===
==== Alpine ====
Men

Athlete	Event	Run 1	Run 2	Total	Rank
Hossein Saveh-Shemshaki	Slalom	57.59	58.80	1:56.39	41
Hossein Saveh-Shemshaki	Giant slalom	1:31.31	1:34.56	3:05.87	70
Pouria Saveh-Shemshaki	Slalom	DNF	—	—	—
Pouria Saveh-Shemshaki	Giant slalom	1:26.44	1:31.26	2:57.70	60

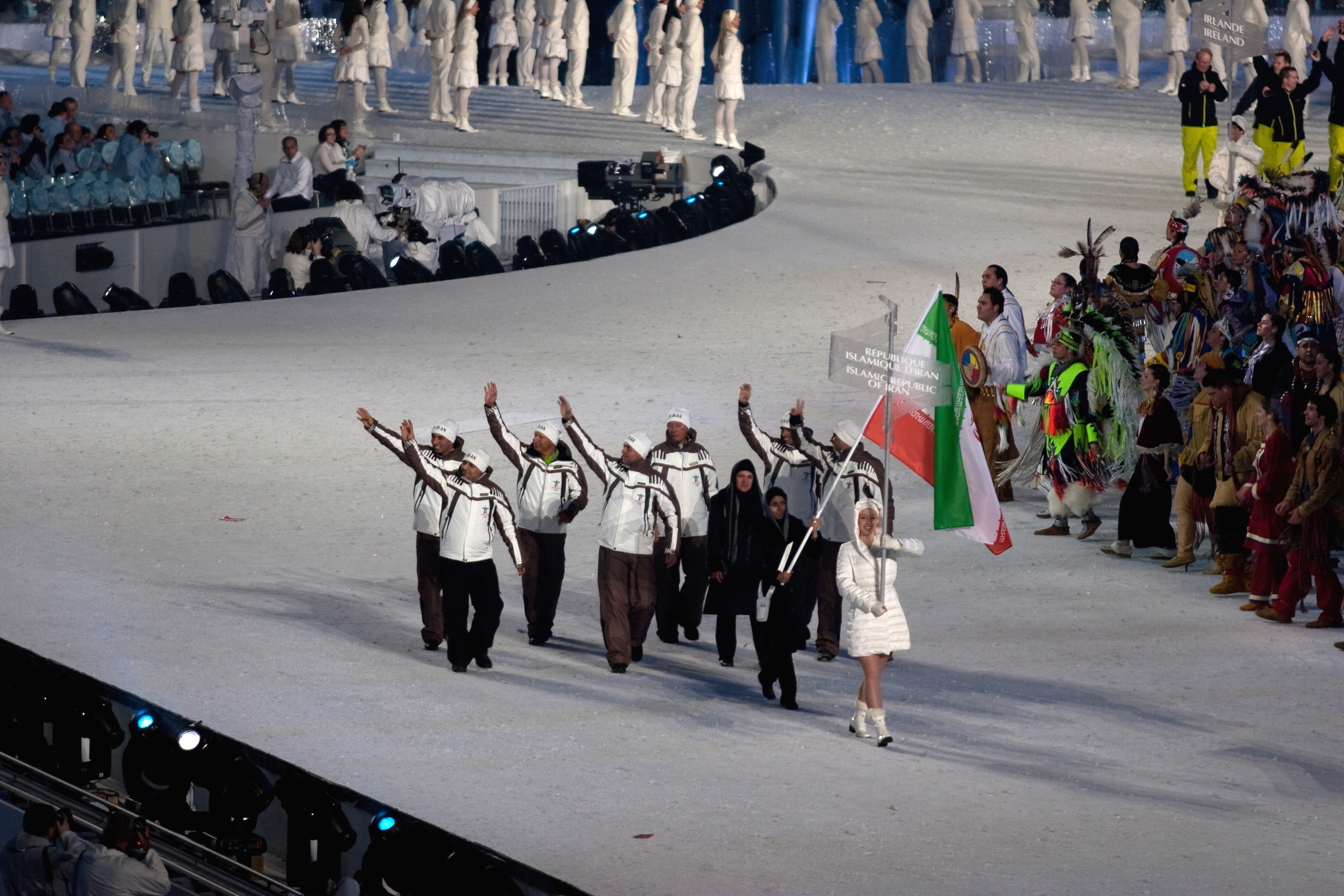
The athletes entering the stadium during the opening ceremonies.

Women

Athlete	Event	Run 1	Run 2	Total	Rank
Marjan Kalhor	Slalom	1:08.65	1:09.95	2:18.60	55
Marjan Kalhor	Giant slalom	1:36.87	1:28.52	3:05.39	60

==== Cross-country ====
Men

Athlete	Event	Time	Rank
Sattar Seid	15 km free	42:41.1	89
