= Asian Alpine Ski Championships =

Alpine skiing championship

The Asian Alpine Ski Championships is an alpine skiing championship organized by the Asian Ski Federation for competitors from the Asian countries.

== List tournaments ==
#	Year	Age group	Venue	Date
1	1991	Children	Suzuran Kogen, Japan	21–23 March 1991
2	1992	Children	Alpensia, South Korea	29–30 January 1992
3	1993	Children	Otoineppu, Japan	17–19 March 1993
4	1994	Children	Yabuli, China	10–11 March 1994
5	1995	Juniors	Alpensia, South Korea	26–28 February 1995
6	1996	Children	Inawashiro, Japan	12–13 March 1996
7	1997	Juniors	Phoenix, South Korea	3–4 March 1997
8	1998		Tottori, Japan	Cancelled
9	1999	Children	Dizin, Iran	18–19 February 1999
10	2000	Children	Mzaar Kfardebian, Lebanon	3–4 March 2000
11	2001	Children	Yongpyong, South Korea	2–3 March 2001
12	2002	Children	Owani, Japan	8–9 March 2002
	2003	Children	Dizin, Iran	Cancelled
13	2004	Juniors	Dizin, Iran	11–12 March 2004
14	2005	Children	Beidahu, China	26–27 February 2005
15	2006	Juniors	Yomase, Japan	16–17 March 2006
16	2007	Children	Yongpyong, South Korea	7–8 March 2007
17	2008	Juniors	Mzaar Kfardebian, Lebanon	23–24 February 2008
18	2009	Children	Mzaar Kfardebian, Lebanon	14–15 February 2009
19	2010	Juniors	Shymbulak, Kazakhstan	4–6 March 2010
20	2011	Children	Kangwon, South Korea	4–5 March 2011
21	2012	Juniors	Dizin, Iran	22–24 February 2012
22	2013	Children	Shymbulak, Kazakhstan	27–28 February 2013
23	2014	Juniors	Dizin, Iran	4–6 March 2014
24	2015	Seniors	Yongpyong, South Korea	3–4 March 2015
25	2016	Children	Mzaar Kfardebian, Lebanon	5–6 March 2016
26	2017	Juniors	Mzaar Kfardebian, Lebanon	5 March 2017
27	2018	Seniors	Darbandsar, Iran	4–6 March 2018
28	2019	Children	Yongpyong, South Korea	16–17 March 2019
29	2020	Juniors	Dizin, Iran	Cancelled
30	2022	Seniors	Mzaar Kfardebian, Lebanon	24–26 February 2022
31	2023	Children	Jeongseon, South Korea	8–9 March 2023
32	2024	Juniors	Zhangjiakou, China	8–9 March 2024
