= Forough Abbasi =

Iranian alpine skier (born 1993)

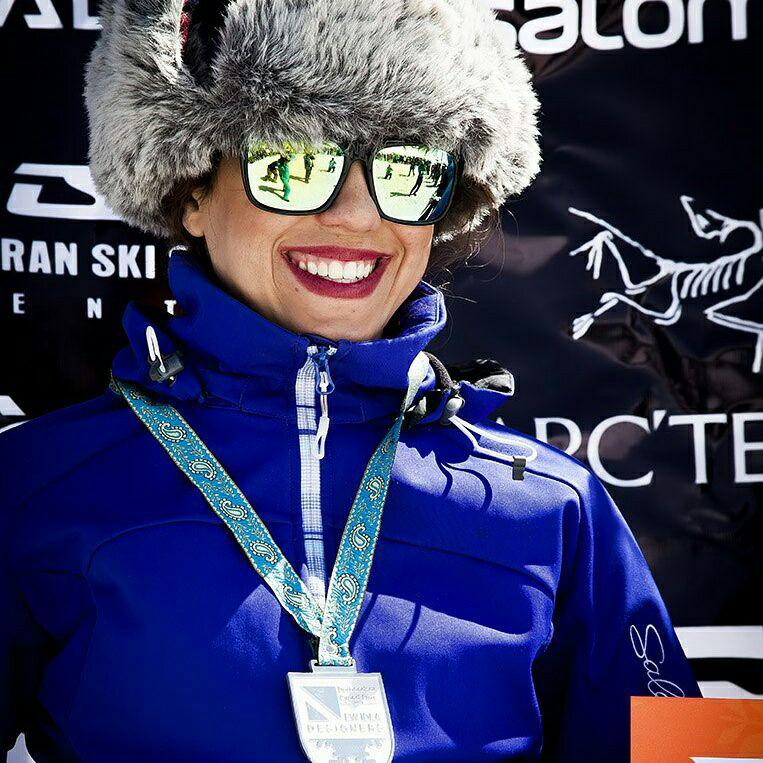

Personal information
- Born: 15 September 1993 (age 32) Shiraz, Iran
Medal record
Alpine skiing
Representing Iran

Forough Abbasi (born 15 September 1993 in Shiraz, Iran) is an alpine skier from Iran. She competed for Iran at the 2014 Winter Olympics and at the 2018 Winter Olympics in the slalom competition, where she achieved a top 50 finish both times. In 2021, Abbasi made a strong appeal for Women's rights in Iran after her coach, Samira Zargari, was banned from leaving Iran by her husband, as under Iranian law a husband can stop their wife from traveling outside of Iran.

== See also ==
- Iran at the 2014 Winter Olympics
- Iran at the 2018 Winter Olympics
