= Samaneh Beyrami Baher =

Iranian cross-country skier (born 1991)

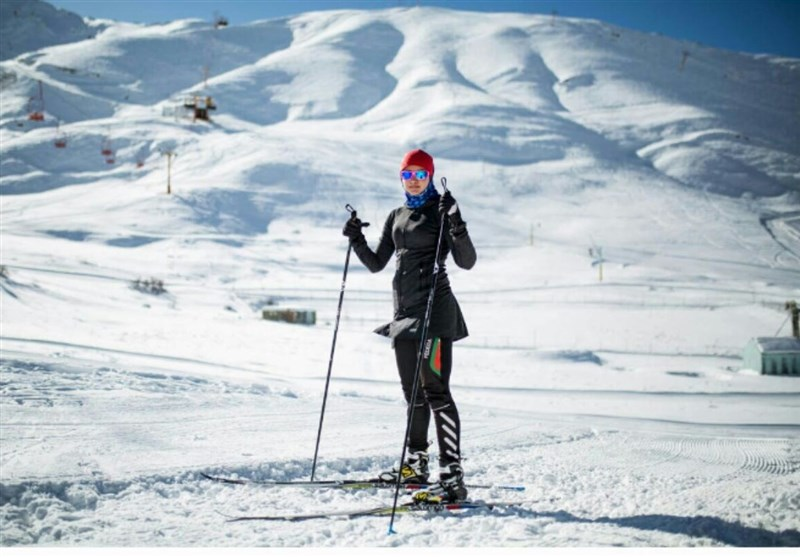
- 2021

Personal information
- Born: 12 June 1991 (age 35) Tehran, Iran
- Height: 171 cm (5 ft 7 in)
- Weight: 60 kg (132 lb)

Samaneh Beyrami Baher (Persian: سمانه بیرامی باهر, born 12 June 1991 in Iran) is an Iranian female cross-country skier. Samaneh competed in the 2018 Winter Olympics in Pyeongchang. She also competed at the 2025 Asian Winter Games and 2026 Winter Olympics.
