= Mariya Grigorova =

Kazakhstani alpine skier (born 1996)

Personal information
- Born: 4 March 1996 (age 30)

Sport
- Country: Kazakhstan
- Sport: Alpine skiing

Mariya Grigorova (Мария Николаевна Григорова, born 4 March 1996) is a Kazakhstani alpine skier. She competed in slalom and giant slalom at the 2018 Winter Olympics.
