= Ovaness Meguerdonian =

Iranian skier (born 1929)

Personal information
- Nationality: Iranian
- Born: 1929 Tehran, Iran

Sport
- Sport: Alpine skiing

Ovaness Meguerdonian (born 1929) is an Iranian former alpine skier. He competed at the 1964 Winter Olympics and the 1968 Winter Olympics.
