= Darbandsar Ski Resort =

Ski resort in Iran

Darbandsar
- Location within Iran
- Location: Darband Sar, Iran
- Coordinates: 36°01′16.8″N 51°27′56.2″E
- Top elevation: 3,500 m (11,500 ft)
- Base elevation: 2,600 m (8,500 ft)
- Trails: 5
- Lift system: 1 gondolas 3 chairlifts 2 Surface lifts
- Snowmaking: Yes
- Night skiing: Yes
- Website: http://main.darbandsarski.ir

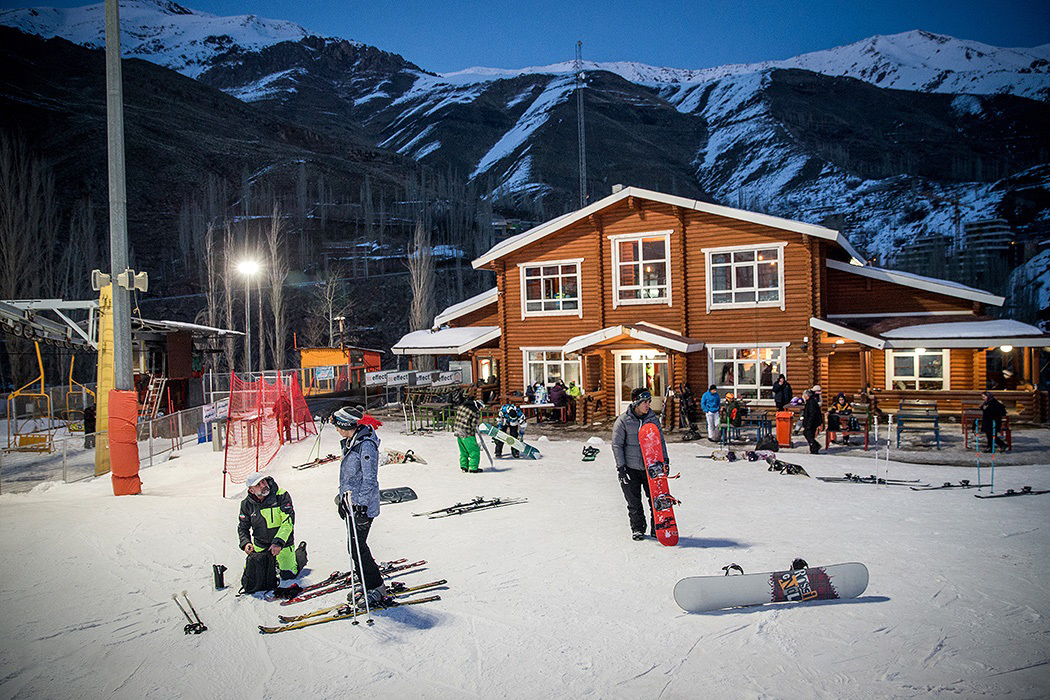

Darbandsar is one of the largest Iranian ski resorts, and is located in Tehran Province. It is located on the Alborz mountain range about 47 kilometres away from the Iranian capital of Tehran.

Darbandsar is the only resort in Iran that is capable of Snowmaking.

== See also ==
- List of ski areas and resorts in Iran
- List of ski areas and resorts
- Sports in Iran
