= Lotfollah Kiashemshaki =

Iranian alpine skier (born 1938)

Personal information
- Nationality: Iranian
- Born: 1 June 1938 (age 86); Shemshak, Iran

Sport
- Sport: Alpine skiing

Lotfollah Kiashemshaki (born 1 June 1938) is an Iranian alpine skier. He competed at the 1964, 1968 and the 1972 Winter Olympics.
