= National Olympic Committee of the Islamic Republic of Iran =

National Olympic Committee of Iran

- Country: Iran
- Code: IRI
- Created: 1947; 79 years ago
- Recognized: 1947
- Continental Association: OCA
- Headquarters: Tehran, Iran
- President: Mahmoud Khosravivafa
- Website: olympic.ir

The National Olympic Committee of the Islamic Republic of Iran (Persian: کمیته ملی المپیک جمهوری اسلامی ایران) is the National Olympic Committee (NOC) for Iran, and the governing body of Olympic sports in Iran. It was founded in 1947 and is headquartered in Tehran.

Former logo of the National Olympic Committee of Iran (Before the Iranian Revolution of 1979)

== Presidents ==
- Mahmoud Khosravivafa (current)

== See also ==
- National Olympic Academy of Iran
- Iran at the Olympics
- Iran at the Asian Games
- I.R. Iran National Paralympic Committee
