= Short-track speed skating at the 2015 Winter Universiade – Men's 1000 metres =

The men's 1000 metres competition of the Short track speed skating at the 2015 Winter Universiade was held at the Universiade Igloo, Granada on February 13.

== Results ==
=== Preliminaries ===
Q — qualified for Heats
QT- qualified by time
ADV — advanced
PEN — penalty

Rank	Heat	Bib	Name	Country	Time	Notes
1	1	69	Iwasa Dan	Japan	1:28.417	Q
2	1	50	Samuel Belanger-Marceau	Canada	1:28.606	Q
3	1	65	Jeremy Masson	France	1:28.829	QT
4	1	84	Rafał Grycner	Poland	1:29.195	
1	2	56	Ma Xingguang	China	1:29.445	Q
2	2	82	Dennis Visser	Netherlands	1:29.531	Q
3	2	71	Muratake Hironobu	Japan	1:29.695	QT
4	2	96	Artem Khmelnivskyi	Ukraine	1:33.593	
1	3	53	Yoan Gauthier	Canada	1:27.977	Q
2	3	93	Timur Zakharov	Russia	1;28.153	Q
3	3	59	Xu Fu	China	1:28.29	QT
4	3	60	Victor Martinez Blanch	Spain	1:35.037	
1	4	77	Park Se-young	South Korea	1:32.927	Q
2	4	89	Dmitriy Miasnikov	Russia	1:33.171	Q
3	4	104	Jae Jae Yoo	United States	1:34.705	ADV
	4	67	Matteo Compagnoni	Italy		PEN
1	5	99	Adam Callister	United States	1:28.632	Q
2	5	78	Seo Yi-ra	South Korea	1:28.654	Q
3	5	87	Wojciech Kraśnicki	Poland	1:29.017	QT
4	5	97	Stanislav Omelchenko	Ukraine	1:32.943	
1	6	72	Sekai Minto	Japan	1;31.833	Q
2	6	80	Leon Bloemhof	Netherlands	1:31.972	Q
3	6	100	William Mullarkey	United States	1:32.791	
4	6	95	Mykyta Sokolov	Ukraine	1:34.297	
1	7	83	Adam Filipowicz	Poland	No Time	Q
2	7	66	Tristan Navarro	France	No Time	Q
3	7	61	Roger Vallverdu Imbernon	Spain	No Time	ADV
4	7	94	Matthew Mak	Singapore	No Time	
1	8	55	Chen Guang	China	1:27.93	Q
2	8	64	Yoann Martinez	France	1:29.088	Q
3	8	68	Pietro de Lorenzis	Italy	1:30.734	QT
4	8	52	Pascal Dion	Canada	No Time	
1	9	74	Han Seung-soo	South Korea	1:29.925	Q
2	9	90	Kirill Shashin	Russia	1:30.118	Q
3	9	81	Dylan Hoogerwerf	Netherlands	1:31.425	QT
4	9	79	Normans Beikmanis	Latvia	1:34.951	

=== Heats ===
Q — qualified for Quarterfinals
QT- qualified by time
ADV — advanced
PEN — penalty

Rank	Heat	Bib	Name	Country	Time	Notes
1	1	55	Chen Guang	China	1:32.962	Q
2	1	50	Samuel Belanger-Marceau	Canada	1:33.203	Q
3	1	81	Dylan Hoogerwerf	Netherlands	1:33.427	QT
4	1	64	Yoann Martinez	France	1:33.577	
5	1	104	Jae Jae Yoo	United States	1:34.441	
1	2	72	Sekai Minto	Japan	1:36.587	Q
2	2	59	Xu Fu	China	1;36.664	Q
	2	66	Tristan Navarro	France		DNF
	2	74	Han Seung-soo	South Korea		PEN
1	3	69	Iwasa Dan	Japan	1:32.182	Q
2	3	93	Timur Zakharov	Russia	1:33.119	Q
3	3	87	Wojciech Kraśniecki	Poland	1:33.845	
	3	80	Leon Bloemhof	Netherlands		PEN
1	4	78	Seo Yi-ra	South Korea	1:29.423	Q
2	4	53	Yoan Gauthier	Canada	1:29.478	Q
3	4	82	Dennis Visser	Netherlands	1:29.943	QT
4	4	68	Pietro de Lorenzis	Italy	1:32.998	
5	4	61	Roger Vallverdu Imbernon	Spain	1:36.865	
1	5	77	Park Se-young	South Korea	1:28.451	Q
2	5	89	Dmitriy Miasnikov	Russia	1;28.999	Q
3	5	65	Jeremy Masson	France	1:29.089	QT
	5	56	Ma Xingguang	China		PEN
1	6	90	Kirill Shashin	Russia	1:30.992	Q
2	6	99	Adam Callister	United States	1:31.076	Q
3	6	71	Muratake Hironobu	Japan	1:31.151	QT
4	6	83	Adam Filipowicz	Poland	1:32.004	

=== Quarterfinals ===
Q — qualified for Semifinals
ADV — advanced
PEN — penalty

Rank	Heat	Bib	Name	Country	Time	Notes
1	1	77	Park Se-young	South Korea	1:32.999	Q
2	1	50	Samuel Belanger-Marceau	Canada	1:33.111	Q
3	1	65	Jeremy Masson	France	1:33.676	
4	1	90	Kirill Shashin	Russia	No Time	
1	2	69	Iwasa Dan	Japan	1:34.628	Q
2	2	53	Yoan Gauthier	Canada	1:34.672	Q
3	2	89	Dmitriy Miasnikov	Russia	1:34.787	
4	2	81	Dylan Hoogerwerf	Netherlands	1:35.064	
1	3	78	Seo Yi-ra	South Korea	1:29.607	Q
2	3	72	Sekai Minto	Japan	1:30.445	Q
3	3	82	Dennis Visser	Netherlands	No Time	
4	3	59	Xu Fu	China	No Time	
1	4	71	Muratake Hironobu	Japan	1:32.31	Q
2	4	55	Chen Guang	China	1:32.453	Q
3	4	99	Adam Callister	United States	1:32.768	
4	4	93	Timur Zakharov	Russia	1:32.966	

=== Semifinals ===
QA — qualified for Final A
QB- qualified for Final B
ADV — advanced
PEN — penalty

Rank	Heat	Bib	Name	Country	Time	Notes
1	1	55	Chen Guang	China	1:32.954	QA
2	1	71	Muratake Hironobu	Japan	1:33.271	QA
3	1	50	Samuel Belanger-Marceau	Canada	1:33.29	QB
4	1	69	Iwasa Dan	Japan	No Time	QB
1	2	78	Seo Yi-ra	South Korea	1:29.274	QA
2	2	77	Park Se-young	South Korea	1:29.296	QA
3	2	72	Sekai Minto	Japan	1:29.49	QB
4	2	53	Yoan Gauthier	Canada	No Time	QB

=== Final B (classification round) ===
Rank	Bib	Name	Country	Time	Notes
5	53	Yoan Gauthier	Canada	1:34.704	
6	72	Sekai Minto	Japan	1:35.013	
7	50	Samuel Belanger-Marceau	Canada	1:35.167	
8	69	Iwasa Dan	Japan	1:35.304	

=== Final A (medal round) ===
Rank	Bib	Name	Country	Time	Notes
1st place, gold medalist(s)	77	Park Se-young	South Korea	1:25.907	
2nd place, silver medalist(s)	78	Seo Yi-ra	South Korea	1:26	
3rd place, bronze medalist(s)	55	Chen Guang	China	1:26.171	
4	71	Muratake Hironobu	Japan	1:26.335	
