= Short-track speed skating at the 2015 Winter Universiade – Men's 500 metres =

The men's 500 metres competition of the Short track speed skating at the 2015 Winter Universiade was held at the Universiade Igloo, Granada on February 12.

== Results ==
=== Preliminaries ===
Q — qualified for Heats
QT- qualified by time
ADV — advanced
PEN — penalty

Rank	Heat	Bib	Name	Country	Time	Notes
1	1	53	Yoan Gauthier	Canada	42.595	Q
2	1	83	Adam Filipowicz	Poland	42.756	Q
3	1	79	Normans Beikmanis	Latvia	45.586	ADV
	1	64	Yoann Martinez	France		PEN
1	2	92	Eduard Strelkov	Russia	42.312	Q
2	2	54	William Louis Preudhomme	Canada	42.41	Q
3	2	84	Rafał Grycner	Poland	42.9	QT
4	2	61	Roger Vallverdu Imbernon	Spain	45.813	
1	3	77	Park Se-Young	South Korea	41.581	Q
2	3	80	Leon Bloemhof	Netherlands	41.968	Q
3	3	67	Matteo Compagnoni	Italy	42.91	QT
4	3	95	Mykyta Sokolov	Ukraine	44.973	
1	4	55	Chen Guang	China	41.775	Q
2	4	50	Samuel Belanger-Marceau	Canada	42.083	Q
3	4	62	Paul Beauchamp	France	43.588	QT
4	4	100	William Mullarkey	United States	No Time	
1	5	74	Han Seung-Soo	South Korea	42.043	Q
2	5	58	Sui Xin	China	42.24	Q
3	5	101	Benjamin Oh	United States	43.853	QT
4	5	94	Matthew Mak	Singapore	48.785	
1	6	71	Muratake Hironobu	Japan	42.002	Q
2	6	90	Kirill Shashin	Russia	42.121	Q
3	6	68	Pietro de Lorenzis	Italy	44.393	
4	6	60	Victor Martinez Blanch	Spain	46.027	
1	7	56	Ma Xingguang	China	42.436	Q
2	7	81	Dylan Hoogerwerf	Netherlands	42.517	Q
3	7	73	Yokoyama Hiroki	Japan	42.72	QT
4	7	97	Stanislav Omelchenko	Ukraine	45.308	
1	8	89	Dmitrii Miasnikov	Russia	42.616	Q
2	8	65	Jeremy Masson	France	43.566	Q
3	8	96	Artem Khmelivskyi	Ukraine	44.833	
4	8	102	Ian Quinn	United States	45.036	
1	9	78	Seo Yi-Ra	South Korea	42.022	Q
2	9	70	Iwashita Hijiri	Japan	42.308	Q
3	9	82	Dennis Visser	Netherlands	42.339	QT
4	9	85	Wojciech Kamienski	Poland	43.057	

=== Heats ===
Q — qualified for Quarterfinals
QT- qualified by time
ADV — advanced
PEN — penalty
DNF - did not finish
UR - universiade record

Rank	Heat	Bib	Name	Country	Time	Notes
1	1	78	Seo Yi-Ra	South Korea	41.622	Q
2	1	89	Dmitrii Miasnikov	Russia	41.734	Q
3	1	81	Dylan Hoogerwerf	Netherlands	42.124	QT
4	1	84	Rafał Grycner	Poland	42.834	
1	2	56	Ma Xingguang	China	41.924	Q
2	2	92	Eduard Strelkov	Russia	42.302	Q
3	2	82	Dennis Visser	Netherlands	42.313	QT
4	2	65	Jeremy Masson	France	42.909	
1	3	71	Muratake Hironobu	Japan	41.874	Q
2	3	80	Leon Bloemhof	Netherlands	41.904	Q
3	3	67	Matteo Compagnoni	Italy	43.137	
	3	54	William Louis Preudhomme	Canada		DNF
1	4	55	Chen Guang	China	41.486	Q
2	4	50	Samuel Belander-Marceau	Canada	41.569	Q
3	4	70	Iwashita Hijiri	Japan	41.626	QT
4	4	62	Paul Beauchamp	France	43.69	
1	5	77	Park Se-Young	South Korea	41.113	Q,UR
2	5	58	Sui Xin	China	41.491	Q
3	5	90	Kirill Shashin	Russia	41.619	QT
4	5	101	Benjamin Oh	United States	43.954	
5	5	79	Normans Beikmanis	Latvia	45.012	
1	6	74	Han Seung-Soo	South Korea	42.335	Q
2	6	73	Yokoyama Hiroki	Japan	42.493	Q
3	6	83	Adam Filipowicz	Poland	42.738	
4	6	53	Yoan Gauthier	Canada	42.993	

=== Quarterfinals ===
Q — qualified for Semifinals
ADV — advanced
PEN — penalty
UR — universiade record

Rank	Heat	Bib	Name	Country	Time	Notes
1	1	55	Chen Guang	China	41.404	Q
2	1	74	Han Seung-Soo	South Korea	41.614	Q
3	1	70	Iwashita Hijiri	Japan	41.73	
4	1	50	Samuel Belanger-Marceau	Canada	41.819	
1	2	71	Muratake Hironobu	Japan	41.97	Q
2	2	80	Leon Bloemhof	Netherlands	42.064	Q
3	2	90	Kirill Shashin	Russia	42.296	
	2	56	Ma Xingguang	China		PEN
1	3	77	Park Se-Young	South Korea	41.554	Q
2	3	92	Eduard Strelkov	Russia	42.09	Q
3	3	82	Dennis Visser	Netherlands	42.215	
4	3	58	Sui Xin	China	No Time	
1	4	78	Seo Yi-Ra	South Korea	41.057	Q,UR
2	4	89	Dmitrii Miasnikov	Russia	41.261	Q
3	4	73	Yokoyama Hiroki	Japan	41.646	
4	4	81	Dylan Hoogerwerf	Netherlands	No Time	

=== Semifinals ===
QA — qualified for Final A
QB - qualified for Final B
ADV — advanced
PEN — penalty

Rank	Heat	Bib	Name	Country	Time	Notes
1	1	78	Seo Yi-Ra	South Korea	41.299	QA
2	1	74	Han Seung-Soo	South Korea	41.367	QA
3	1	71	Muratake Hironobu	Japan	41.429	QB
4	1	80	Leon Bloemhof	Netherlands	41.775	QB
1	2	77	Park Se-Young	South Korea	41.498	QA
2	2	55	Chen Guang	China	41.757	QA
3	2	89	Dmitrii Miasnikov	Russia	41.819	QB
4	2	92	Eduard Strelkov	Russia	42.113	QB

=== Finals ===
==== Final B (classification round) ====
Rank	Bib	Name	Country	Time	Notes
5	71	Muratake Hironobu	Japan	42.173	
6	89	Dmitrii Miasnikov	Russia	42.805	
7	80	Leon Bloemhof	Netherlands	43.199	
8	92	Eduard Strelkov	Russia	46.463	

==== Final A (medal round) ====
Rank	Bib	Name	Country	Time	Notes
1st place, gold medalist(s)	78	Seo Yi-Ra	South Korea	41.411	
2nd place, silver medalist(s)	74	Han Seung-Soo	South Korea	41.542	
3rd place, bronze medalist(s)	55	Chen Guang	China	41.611	
4	77	Park Se-Young	South Korea	No Time	
