= Short-track speed skating at the 2015 Winter Universiade – Men's 1500 metres =

The men's 1500 metres competition of the Short track speed skating at the 2015 Winter Universiade was held at the Universiade Igloo, Granada on February 11.

== Results ==
=== Heats ===
Q — qualified for Semifinals
ADV — advanced
PEN — penalty

Rank	Heat	Bib	Name	Country	Time	Notes
1	1	55	Chen Guang	China	2:34.645	Q
2	1	91	Alexander Shubekin	Russia	2:35.238	Q
3	1	63	Thomas Meline	France	2:35.368	Q
4	1	104	Jae Jae Yoo	United States	2:36.059	
5	1	73	Yokoyama Hiroki	Japan	2:50.783	ADV
	1	95	Mykyta Sokolov	Ukraine		PEN
1	2	77	Park Se-Young	South Korea	2:18.976	Q
2	2	51	Cedrik Blais	Canada	2;19.55	Q
3	2	72	Sekai Minto	Japan	2:19.938	Q
4	2	67	Matteo Compagnoni	Italy	2:21.172	
5	2	96	Artem Khmelivskyi	Ukraine	2:26.091	
	2	82	Dennis Visser	Netherlands		PEN
1	3	74	Han Seung-Soo	South Korea	2:32.006	Q
2	3	87	Wojciech Kraśnicki	Poland	2;32.931	Q
3	3	103	Aaron Tran	United States	2:33.059	Q
4	3	60	Victor Martinez Blanch	Spain	2:39.75	
5	3	66	Tristan Navarro	France	2:55.598	ADV
	3	68	Pietro de Lorenzis	Italy		PEN
1	4	93	Timur Zakharov	Russia	2:30.152	Q
2	4	52	Pascal Dion	Canada	2:30.296	Q
3	4	81	Dylan Hoogerwerf	Netherlands	2:30.908	Q
4	4	85	Wojciech Kamienski	Poland	2:31.371	
5	4	97	Stanislav Omelchenko	Ukraine	2:35.013	
6	4	79	Normans Beikmanis	Latvia	2:38.844	
1	5	78	Seo Yi-Ra	South Korea	3:01.193	Q
2	5	59	Xu Fu	China	3:01.298	Q
3	5	70	Iwashita Hijiri	Japan	3:01.388	Q
4	5	62	Paul Beauchamp	France	3;01.442	
5	5	86	Michał Kłosiński	Poland	3:04.965	
6	5	61	Roger Vallverdu Imbernon	Spain	3:06.407	
1	6	99	Adam Callister	United States	2:41.513	Q
2	6	54	William Louis Preudhomme	Canada	2;41.634	Q
3	6	92	Eduard Strelkov	Russia	2;41.682	Q
4	6	56	Ma Xingguang	China	2;41.699	
5	6	80	Leon Bloemhof	Netherlands	2;41.919	
6	6	94	Matthew Mak	Singapore	No Time	

=== Semifinals ===
QA — qualified for Finals A
QB — qualified for Finals B
ADV — advanced
PEN — penalty

Rank	Heat	Bib	Name	Country	Time	Notes
1	1	77	Park Se-Young	South Korea	2:26.432	QA
2	1	78	Seo Yi-Ra	South Korea	2:26.579	QA
3	1	73	Yokoyama Hiroki	Japan	2:27.075	QB
4	1	72	Sekai Minto	Japan	2:27.32	QB
5	1	59	Xu Fu	China	2:27.442	
6	1	51	Cedrik Blais	Canada	2:27.836	
7	1	70	Iwashita Hijiri	Japan	No Time	
1	2	74	Han Seung-Soo	South Korea	2:39.564	QA
2	2	55	Chen Guang	China	2:39.734	QA
3	2	103	Aaron Tran	United States	2:40.612	QB
4	2	91	Alexander Shubekin	Russia	2:40.695	QB
5	2	63	Thomas Meline	France	2:40.776	
6	2	87	Wojciech Kraśniecki	Poland	2;40.923	
1	3	99	Adam Callister	United States	2:30.957	QA
2	3	52	Pascal Dion	Canada	2:31.027	QA
3	3	92	Eduard Strelkov	Russia	2:31.392	QB
4	3	81	Dylan Hoogerwerf	Netherlands	2:31.758	QB
5	3	66	Tristan Navarro	France	2:32.642	
6	3	93	Timur Zakharov	Russia	No Time	
7	3	54	William Louis Preudhomme	Canada	No Time	

=== Finals ===
==== Final B (classification round) ====
Rank	Bib	Name	Country	Time	Notes
7	73	Yokoyama Hiroki	Japan	2:25.95	
8	72	Sekai Minto	Japan	2:26.629	
9	92	Eduard Strelkov	Russia	2;26.454	
10	81	Dylan Hoogerwerf	Netherlands	2;26.629	
11	91	Alexander Shubekin	Russia	2;27.919	
12	103	Aaron Tran	United States	2:29.915	

==== Final A (medal round) ====
Rank	Bib	Name	Country	Time	Notes
1st place, gold medalist(s)	77	Park Se-Young	South Korea	2;32.511	
2nd place, silver medalist(s)	74	Han Seung-Soo	South Korea	2:32.798	
3rd place, bronze medalist(s)	55	Chen Guang	China	2:33.509	
4	52	Pascal Dion	Canada	2:33.55	
5	78	Seo Yi-Ra	South Korea	2;33.578	
6	99	Adam Callister	United States	2:33.75	
