= Alpine skiing at the 2015 Winter Universiade – Women's slalom =

The women's slalom competition of the 2015 Winter Universiade was held at Universiade slope, Sierra Nevada, Spain on February 13, 2015.

== Results ==
Rank	Bib	Name	Nation	Run 1	Rank	Run 2	Rank	Total	Behind
1st place, gold medalist(s)	2	Thea Grosvold	Norway	48.77	2	49.95	4	1:38.72	
2nd place, silver medalist(s)	8	Monica Hübner	Germany	49.12	4	50.07	6	1:39.19	+0.47
3rd place, bronze medalist(s)	5	Eve Routhier	Canada	48.81	3	50.52	12	1:39.33	+0.61
4	46	Ekaterina Tkachenko	Russia	50.5	13	49.15	1	1:39.65	+0.93
5	14	Lucie Piccard	France	50.06	10	49.78	2	1:39.84	+1.12
6	3	Jessica Honkonen	Finland	50.04	9	49.93	3	1:39.97	+1.25
7	15	Maria Shkanova	Belarus	49.95	8	50.48	10	1:40.43	+1.71
8	21	Karolina Chrapek	Poland	50.13	12	50.31	8	1:40.44	+1.72
9	17	Victoria Martel-Stevens	Canada	49.48	6	51.23	21	1:40.71	+1.99
10	30	Johanna Bœuf	France	49.88	7	50.9	17	1:40.78	+2.06
11	32	Veronika Rudolfová	Czech Republic	51.26	20	50.1	7	1:41.36	+2.64
12	24	Natalie Knowles	Canada	50.54	14	50.83	15	1:41.37	+2.65
13	52	Carmina Pallas	Andorra	51.69	21	50.31	8	1:42	+3.28
14	16	Shane McLean	United States	51.2	16	51.15	19	1:42.35	+3.63
15	6	Jana Gantnerová	Slovakia	50.73	15	51.67	25	1:42.4	+3.68
16	9	Kathrin Auer	Austria	48.5	1	53.93	31	1:42.43	+3.71
17	33	Maren Nessen Byrkjeland	Norway	51.22	17	51.25	23	1:42.47	+3.75
18	22	Tereza Kmochová	Czech Republic	51.25	19	51.25	23	1:42.5	+3.78
19	23	Alexandra Sjöström	Sweden	51,81	23	50.94	18	1:42.75	+4.03
20	38	Sandra Holm	Finland	51.24	18	51.67	25	1:42.91	+4.19
21	18	Romane Nicoletta	France	52.89	28	50.03	5	1:42.92	+4.2
22	19	Laurence Vallerand	Canada	51.73	22	51.2	20	1:42.93	+4.21
23	56	Sofie Carlsson	Sweden	52.14	24	50.81	14	1:42.95	+4.23
24	39	Pavla Klicnarová	Czech Republic	52.7	26	50.48	10	1:43.18	+4.46
25	28	Nadezda Alexeeva	Russia	52.48	25	50.71	13	1:43.19	+4.47
26	43	Alice Macaulay	Great Britain	53.24	29	50.84	16	1:44.08	+5.36
27	51	Manuela Kiener	Switzerland	53.71	32	51.24	22	1:44.95	+6.23
28	47	Daniela Kamenická	Slovakia	53.33	30	51.87	27	1:45.2	+6.48
29	40	Stephanie Gould	Canada	53.54	31	53.25	28	1:46.79	+8.07
30	49	Audrey Chaperon	Switzerland	53.86	33	53.52	29	1:47.38	+8.66
31	62	Nina Halme	Finland	54.3	36	53.65	30	1:47.95	+9.23
32	34	Emma Naatz	United States	54.09	35	54.2	32	1:48.29	+9.57
33	69	Ana Zimšek	Slovenia	55.89	39	56.81	33	1:52.7	+13.98
34	58	Noh Jin-soul	South Korea	57.86	43	57.09	34	1:54.95	+16.23
35	72	Roksana Tymchenko	Ukraine	57.52	41	57.49	35	1:55.01	+16.29
36	13	Devin Delaney	United States	49.42	5	1:08.26	40	1:57.68	+18.96
37	66	Kim Seo-hyun	South Korea	58.62	44	59.82	37	1:58.44	+19.72
38	68	Edita Marenić	Croatia	1:06.06	46	58.01	36	2:04.07	+25.35
39	71	Özlem Çarıkçıoğlu	Turkey	1:02.09	45	1:03.35	39	2:05.44	+26.72
40	41	Clare Wise	United States	1:12.91	47	1:00.28	38	2:13.19	+34.47
41	74	Alara Ayyıldız	Turkey	1:14.28	48	1:14.61	41	2:28.89	+50.17
42	75	Helin Gültekin	Turkey	1:15.3	49	1:15.2	42	2:30.5	+51.78
	1	Claudia Paquin-Ricard	Canada	56	40	DNF	—		
	12	Daria Ovchinikova	Russia	50.06	10	DNF	—		
	35	Bára Straková	Czech Republic	57.7	42	DNF	—		
	37	Saana Ahonen	Finland	54.03	34	DNF	—		
	59	Gaia Martinelli	Italy	52.78	27	DNF	—		
	61	Magdalena Klusak	Poland	54.42	37	DNF	—		
	65	Lee Hyun-ji	South Korea	55.28	38	DNF	—		
	20	Maria Bedareva	Russia	DNS	—				
	4	Kristína Saalová	Slovakia	DNF	—				
	7	Mukogawa Sakurako	Japan	DNF	—				
	10	Carmen Geyr	Italy	DNF	—				
	11	Arai Makiko	Japan	DNF	—				
	25	Kristine Fausa Aasberg	Norway	DNF	—				
	26	Sabina Majerczyk	Poland	DNF	—				
	27	Maria Nairz	Italy	DNF	—				
	31	Sohvi Virkkula	Finland	DNF	—				
	36	Núria Pau	Spain	DNF	—				
	42	Aleksandra Prokopyeva	Russia	DNF	—				
	44	Helena Rapaport	Sweden	DNF	—				
	48	Sara Ramentol	Andorra	DNF	—				
	50	Inda Garin	Spain	DNF	—				
	53	Júlia Bargalló	Spain	DNF	—				
	54	Choe Jeong-hyeon	South Korea	DNF	—				
	55	Martina Gebert	Switzerland	DNF	—				
	57	Mariana Boix	Spain	DNF	—				
	60	Lisa Pfeifer	Italy	DNF	—				
	63	Ko Un-Sori	South Korea	DNF	—				
	64	Ekaterina Popova	Russia	DNF	—				
	67	Olga Pogrebitskaya	Russia	DNF	—				
	70	Ni Yueming	China	DNF	—				
	73	Sun Meng	China	DNF	—				
	29	Courtney Altringer	United States	DSQ	—				
	45	Danielle Brownell-Patty	United States	DSQ	—				
