= Biathlon at the 2015 Winter Universiade – Men's 12.5 km pursuit =

The men's 12.5 km pursuit competition of the 2015 Winter Universiade was held at the National Biathlon Centre in Osrblie on January 28.

== Results ==
Rank	Bib	Name	Country	Time	Penalties (P+P+S+S)	Deficit
1st place, gold medalist(s)	3	Yuri Shopin	Russia	30:25.5	0 (0+0+0+0)	
2nd place, silver medalist(s)	1	Iaroslav Ivanov	Russia	30:27	1 (0+0+0+1)	+1.5
3rd place, bronze medalist(s)	2	Maksim Burtasov	Russia	31:08.1	3 (1+0+2+0)	+42.6
4	11	Vincent Mathieu	France	31:55.1	1 (0+1+0+0)	+1:29.6
5	18	Oleg Kolodiichuk	Russia	32:17.6	1 (0+1+0+0)	+1;52.1
6	8	Stanislav Pershikov	Russia	32:17.7	3 (1+0+2+0)	+1:52.2
7	15	Michal Sima	Slovakia	32:32.7	2 (0+0+1+1)	+2:07.2
8	5	Vasyl Potapenko	Ukraine	32:32.8	1 (0+0+1+0)	+2:07.3
9	16	Yohan Huillier	France	32:55.8	3 (0+0+2+1)	+2:30.3
10	13	Håkon Svaland	Norway	32:59.4	4 (1+2+1+0)	+2:33.9
11	12	Dmytro Rusinov	Ukraine	33:08.7	4 (0+1+1+2)	+2:43.2
12	10	Michal Kubaliak	Slovakia	33:09	4 (1+1+1+1)	+2:34.5
13	14	Ole Martin Erdal	Norway	33:46.1	4 (0+1+2+1)	+3:20.6
14	9	Vassiliy Podkorytov	Kazakhstan	33:56	4 (1+0+1+2)	+3:30.5
15	6	Ruslan Tkalenko	Ukraine	34:05.3	5 (1+0+2+2)	+3:39.8
16	21	Chris Endre Haugen	Norway	34:08.1	1 (0+0+0+1)	+3:42.6
17	19	Maksim Ramanouski	Belarus	34:12.2	2 (0+0+0+2)	+3:46.7
18	17	Vitaliy Kilchytskyy	Ukraine	34:14.2	5 (0+2+3+0)	+3:48.7
19	20	Tommy Grøtte	Norway	34:27.9	3 (0+1+0+2)	+4:02.4
20	23	Sergey Neverov	Russia	34:40.8	3 (1+1+1+0)	+4:15.3
21	27	Sami Orpana	Finland	34:56.7	2 (0+0+1+1)	+4:31.2
22	28	Aliaksei Abromchyk	Belarus	35:14	0 (0+0+0+0)	+4;48.5
23	26	Thibaut Ogier	France	35:14.4	4 (1+1+0+2)	+4:48.9
24	25	Dany Chavoutier	France	35:51.3	7 (3+1+1+2)	+5:25.8
25	30	Oleksii Kravchenko	Ukraine	36:00.6	1 (0+1+0+0)	+5:35.1
26	22	Timur Khamitgatin	Kazakhstan	36:34	6 (3+1+2+0)	+6:08.5
27	24	Henrich Lonsky	Slovakia	37:04.3	7 (3+1+1+2)	+6:38.3
28	37	Michal Žák	Czech Republic	37:13.9	1 (0+1+0+0)	+6:48.4
29	34	Henri Lehtomaa	Finland	37:48	7 (2+1+2+2)	+7:22.5
30	32	René Bevelaqua	Slovakia	38:20	3 (0+2+1+0)	+7:54.5
31	31	Kamil Cymerman	Poland	32:29.3	8 (0+1+3+4)	+9:03.8
	29	Aleksander Piech	Poland	LAP	5 (2+1+2)	
	33	Juraj Valenta	Slovakia	LAP	5 (5)	
	35	Hokuto Tanaka	Japan	LAP	4 (1+3)	
	36	Ruslan Bessov	Kazakhstan	LAP	4 (2+2)	
	38	Son Sung-rack	South Korea	LAP	2 (2+0)	
	39	Krzysztof Guzik	Poland	LAP	4 (2+2)	
	40	Alexandr Kulinich	Kazakhstan	LAP	2 (0+2)	
	41	Marcin Piasecki	Poland	LAP	2 (1+1)	
	42	Anton Kastussyov	Kazakhstan	LAP	3 (3)	
	43	Ahmet Üstüntaş	Turkey	LAP	3 (1+2)	
	44	Kim Chang-hyun	South Korea	LAP	2 (2)	
	45	Marek Kittel	Czech Republic	LAP	0 (0+0)	
	47	Kim Ju-sung	South Korea	LAP	1 (1)	
	48	Reagan Mills	Canada	LAP	1 (1)	
	49	Loïc Dehottay	Belgium	LAP	3 (3)	
	50	Jeremy Flanagan	Australia	LAP	1 (1)	
	51	Evan Girard	Canada	LAP	3 (3)	
	53	Vjačeslavs Mihalovs	Latvia	LAP	0 (0)	
	54	Sasha Eccleston	Canada	LAP	3 (3)	
	55	Adam Buki	Hungary	LAP	4 (4)	
	56	Samuel West	Canada	LAP	3 (3)	
	57	Alex Gibson	Australia	LAP	4 (4)	
	58	David Buki	Hungary	LAP	3 (3)	
	7	Maxim Braun	Kazakhstan	DNF	(0+0)	
	4	Michal Krčmář	Czech Republic	DNS		
	46	Organhazi Civil	Turkey	DNS		
	52	Christian Lorenzi	Italy	DNS		
