= Alpine skiing at the 2015 Winter Universiade – Men's super-G =

The men's super-G competition of the 2015 Winter Universiade was held at Universiade slope, Sierra Nevada, Spain on February 6, 2015.

== Results ==
Rank	Bib	Name	Country	Time	Difference
1st place, gold medalist(s)	12	Michelangelo Tentori	Italy	1:23.74	
2nd place, silver medalist(s)	11	Marc Oliveras	Andorra	1:23.75	+0.01
3rd place, bronze medalist(s)	2	Sandro Boner	Switzerland	1:24.23	+0.49
4	18	Vegard Busengdal	Norway	1:24.65	+0.91
5	6	Bernhard Graf	Austria	1:24.89	+1.15
6	5	Maksim Stukov	Russia	1:24.93	+1.19
7	4	Kristoffer Berger	Norway	1:25.17	+1.43
8	16	Michał Klusak	Poland	1:25.41	+1.67
9	15	Evgenij Pyasik	Russia	1:25.45	+1.71
10	9	Luca Riorda	Italy	1:25.46	+1.72
11	14	Ivo Ricou	France	1:26.08	+2.34
12	22	Adam Chrapek	Poland	1:26.18	+2.44
13	19	Matej Falat	Slovakia	1:26.34	+2.6
14	20	Max Marno	United States	1:26.68	+2.94
15	17	Yuri Danilochkin	Belarus	1:26.75	+3.01
16	27	Vladislav Novikov	Russia	1:26.82	+3.08
17	24	Nakamura Shun	Japan	1:26.84	+3.1
18	32	Youri Mougel	France	1:26.9	+3.16
19	26	Anton Smolenskiy	Russia	1:26.93	+3.19
20	21	Adam Zika	Czech Republic	1:27.59	+3.85
20	13	Evgenij Tulupov	Russia	1:27.59	+3.85
22	34	Kalle Peltola	Finland	1:27.79	+4.05
23	39	Graham Black	United States	1:29.45	+4.71
23	30	Jakub Klusak	Poland	1:28.45	+4.71
25	48	Mateusz Garniewicz	Poland	1:28.72	+4.98
26	28	Pietro Migliazza	Italy	1:29	+5.26
27	51	Alberto Chiappa	Italy	1:29.14	+5.4
28	36	Miyamoto Shinya	Japan	1:29.73	+5.99
29	29	Michael Waligora	Czech Republic	1:29.77	+6.03
30	35	Vladimir Siráň	Slovakia	1:29.93	+6.19
31	23	Simon Efimov	Russia	1:29.95	+6.21
32	44	Hong Dong-Kwan	South Korea	1:30.47	+6.73
33	41	Lee Jang-Woo	South Korea	1:31.08	+7.34
34	37	Kim Seulkyung	South Korea	1:31.25	+7.51
35	40	Kim Hyeon-Soo	South Korea	1:31.41	+7.67
36	31	Christian Rottanara	Italy	1:33.27	+9.53
37	43	Choi Chang-Hyun	South Korea	1:33.53	+9.79
38	45	Emre Şimşek	Turkey	1:33.92	+10.18
39	49	Ihor Ham	Ukraine	1:38.20	+14.46
40	54	Taras Kovbasnyuk	Ukraine	1:39.81	+16.07
41	50	Andriy Mariichyn	Ukraine	1:46.56	+17.8
42	52	Mustafa Topaloğlu	Turkey	1:46.61	+22.87
	38	Martin Štěpán	Czech Republic	DNS	
	47	Kasper Hietanen	Finland	DNS	
	1	Vincent Lajoie	Canada	DNF	
	3	Franck Berla	France	DNF	
	7	Stian Saugestad	Norway	DNF	
	8	Axel William Patricksson	Norway	DNF	
	10	William Schuessler Bedard	Canada	DNF	
	25	Patrick Boner	Switzerland	DNF	
	42	Kim Dong-Woo	South Korea	DNF	
	33	Daniel Paulus	Czech Republic	DSQ	
	46	Levent Taş	Turkey	DSQ	
	51	Daniil Chertsin	Belarus	DSQ	
