= Alpine skiing at the 2015 Winter Universiade – Men's combined =

The men's combined competition of the 2015 Winter Universiade was held at Universiade slope, Sierra Nevada, Spain on February 8, 2015.

== Results ==
Rank	Bib	Name	Nation	Super-G	Rank	Slalom	Rank	Total	Behind
1st place, gold medalist(s)	12	Sandro Boner	Switzerland	1:20.38	8	44.32	3	2:04.7	
2nd place, silver medalist(s)	15	Giulio Bosca	Italy	1;19.57	2	45.48	8	2:05.05	+0.35
3rd place, bronze medalist(s)	2	Matej Falat	Slovakia	1:20.7	10	44.36	4	2:05.06	+0.36
4	9	Luca Riorda	Italy	1:20.23	7	45.57	9	2:05.8	+1.1
5	4	Vincent Lajoie	France	1:19.88	6	46.34	14	2:06.22	+1.52
6	6	William Schuessler Bedard	Canada	1:19.64	4	47.16	20	2:06.8	+2.1
7	7	Ivo Ricou	France	1:20.9	14	45.99	12	2:06.89	+2.19
8	29	Adam Zika	Czech Republic	1:21.66	16	45.3	6	2:06.96	+2.26
9	16	Adam Chrapek	Poland	1;20.78	12	46.73	16	2:07.51	+2.81
10	1	Yuri Danilochkin	Belarus	1:20.83	13	47.1	=18	2:07.93	+3.23
11	33	Evgenij Tulupov	Russia	1:22.35	20	45.62	10	2:07.97	+3.27
12	51	Youri Mougel	France	1:24.14	23	43.85	1	2:07.99	+3.29
12	19	Jakub Klusak	Poland	1:22.05	15	45.94	11	2:07.99	+3.29
14	26	Vladimir Siráň	Slovakia	1:23.85	22	44.23	2	2:08.08	+3.38
15	20	Michał Klusak	Poland	1:20.99	15	47.1	=18	2:08.09	+3.39
16	27	Daniel Paulus	Czech Republic	1:22.01	17	46.31	13	2:08.32	+3.62
17	23	Pietro Migliazza	Italy	1:23.31	21	45.11	5	2:08.42	+3.72
18	8	Axel William Patricksson	Norway	1:19.63	3	49.08	21	2:08.71	+4.01
19	32	Mateusz Garniewicz	Poland	1:24.35	25	45.37	7	2:09.72	+5.02
20	43	Kasper Hietanen	Finland	1:26.79	31	46.63	15	2;13.42	+8.72
21	40	Kim Seul-Kyung	South Korea	1:27.85	34	46.96	17	2:14.81	+10.11
22	11	Michelangelo Tentori	Italy	1:19.13	1	56.81	27	2:15.94	+11.24
23	36	Miyamoto Shinya	Japan	1:26.07	29	50.3	22	2:16.37	+11.67
24	44	Kim Hyeon-Soo	South Korea	1:26.3	30	54.28	26	2;20.58	+15.88
25	53	Daniil Chertsin	Belarus	1:32.65	40	51.58	24	2:24.53	+19.53
26	45	Andriy Mariichyn	Ukraine	1:34.41	41	51.29	23	2:25.7	+21.00
27	55	Taras Kovbasnyuk	Ukraine	1:35.8	42	54.08	25	2:29.88	+25.18
	5	Max Marno	United States	1:20.73	10	DNF	—		
	17	Vladislav Novikov	Russia	1:22.25	19	DNF	—		
	22	Christian Rottonara	Italy	1:25.61	28	DNF	—		
	25	Stian Saugestad	Norway	1:19.83	5	DNF	—		
	37	Kim Dong-Woo	South Korea	1:28.28	35	DNF	—		
	38	Hong Dong-Kwan	South Korea	1:27.13	33	DNF	—		
	39	Evgenij Pyasik	Russia	1:25.03	27	DNF	—		
	41	Choi Chang-Hyun	South Korea	1:30.04	30	DNF	—		
	42	Lee Jang-Woo	South Korea	1:28.68	36	DNF	—		
	47	Patrick Boner	Switzerland	1:24.76	26	DNF	—		
	49	Levent Taş	Turkey	1:31.24	39	DNF	—		
	50	Emre Şimşek	Turkey	1:30.32	38	DNF	—		
	56	Alberto Chiappa	Italy	1:27	32	DNF	—		
	3	Maksim Stukov	Russia	1:20.41	9	DSQ	—		
	48	Kalle Peltola	Finland	1:24.25	24	DSQ	—		
	21	Martin Štěpán	Czech Republic	DNS	—				
	10	Bernhard Graf	Austria	DNF	—				
	13	Marc Oliveras	Andorra	DNF	—				
	14	Vegard Busengdal	Norway	DNF	—				
	18	Kristoffer Berger	Norway	DNF	—				
	24	Michael Waligora	Czech Republic	DNF	—				
	28	Martin Hyška	Slovakia	DNF	—				
	30	Simon Efimov	Russia	DNF	—				
	31	Nakamura Shun	Japan	DNF	—				
	34	Franck Berla	France	DNF	—				
	35	Graham Black	United States	DNF	—				
	46	Anton Smolenskiy	Russia	DNF	—				
	52	Mustafa Topaloğlu	Turkey	DNF	—				
	54	Ihor Ham	Ukraine	DNF	—				
