= Alpine skiing at the 2015 Winter Universiade – Women's giant slalom =

The women's giant slalom competition of the 2015 Winter Universiade was held at Universiade slope, Sierra Nevada, Spain on February 11, 2015.

== Results ==
Rank	Bib	Name	Nation	Run 1	Rank	Run 2	Rank	Total	Behind
1st place, gold medalist(s)	12	Kristine Fausa Aasberg	Norway	1:04.18	1	1:05.38	1	2:09.56	
2nd place, silver medalist(s)	1	Sabina Majerczyk	Poland	1:06.43	4	1:05.66	3	2:12.09	+2.53
3rd place, bronze medalist(s)	26	Carmina Pallas	Andorra	1:06.91	8	1:05.86	5	2:12.77	+3,21
4	17	Lucie Piccard	France	1:07.08	10	1:05.91	7	2:12.99	+3.43
5	7	Jana Gantnerová	Slovakia	1:06.26	2	1:06.81	12	2:13.07	+3.51
6	6	Lisa Pfeifer	Italy	1:06.32	6	1:06.97	14	2:13.29	+3.73
7	19	Maren Byrkjeland	Norway	1:06.8	7	1:06.5	9	2:13.3	+3.74
8	23	Stephanie Gould	Canada	1:06.7	6	1:06.88	13	2:13.58	+4.02
9	51	Karolina Chrapek	Poland	1:07.52	11	1:06.23	8	2:13.75	+4.19
10	49	Aleksandra Prokopyeva	Russia	1:07.9	13	1:05.86	5	2:13.76	+4.2
11	16	Shane McLean	United States	1:06.98	9	1:07.27	16	2:14.25	+4.69
12	48	Tereza Kmochová	Czech Republic	1:09.41	15	1:05.56	5	2:14.97	+5.41
13	41	Johanna Bœuf	France	1:08.92	14	1:06.5	9	2:15.42	+5.86
14	50	Alice Macaulay	Great Britain	1:10.32	21	1:05.77	4	2:16.09	+6.53
15	40	Bára Straková	Czech Republic	1:10.31	20	1:06.61	11	2:16.92	+7.36
16	47	Ekaterina Popova	Russia	1:09.68	17	1:07.6	19	2:17.28	+7.72
17	66	Magdalena Klusak	Poland	1:10.19	19	1:07.48	18	2:17.67	+8.11
18	42	Emma Naatz	United States	1:10.82	25	1:07.17	15	2:17.99	+8.43
19	61	Veronika Rudolfová	Czech Republic	1:09.76	18	1:08.3	21	2:18.06	+8.5
20	43	Clare Wise	United States	1:10.74	24	1:07.29	17	2:18.08	+8.52
21	45	Alexandra Sjöström	Sweden	1:10.35	22	1:07.84	20	2:18.19	+8.63
22	57	Lee Hyun-Ji	South Korea	1:09.66	16	1:08.63	22	2:18.19	+8.73
23	64	Kim Seo-Hyun	South Korea	1:13.01	27	1:09.38	24	2;22.39	+12.83
24	59	Noh Jin-Soul	South Korea	1:13.08	28	1:09.55	25	2:22.63	+13.07
25	67	Ana Zimšek	Slovenia	1;14.87	30	1:09.03	23	2:23.9	+14.34
26	69	Ni Yueming	China	1:14.5	29	1;13.62	26	2;28.12	+18.56
27	70	Roksana Tymchenko	Ukraine	1:16.91	31	1:13.93	27	2:30.84	+21.18
28	71	Özlem Çarıkçıoğlu	Turkey	1:21.37	32	1:16.22	28	2:37.59	+28.03
	10	Mukogawa Sakurako	Japan	1:07.63	12	DNF	—		
	13	Daria Ovchinnikova	Russia	1:12.54	26	DNF	—		
	15	Eve Routhier	Canada	1:06.44	5	DNF	—		
	46	Laurence Vallerand	Canada	1:10.66	23	DNF	—		
	25	Michaela Dygruber	Austria	DNS	—				
	74	Edita Marenić	Croatia	DNS	—				
	2	Pavla Klicnarová	Czech Republic	DNF	—				
	3	Nina Halme	Finland	DNF	—				
	4	Monica Hübner	Germany	DNF	—				
	5	Maria Nairz	Italy	DNF	—				
	8	Arai Makiko	Japan	DNF	—				
	9	Victoria Stevens	Canada	DNF	—				
	11	Maria Bedareva	Russia	DNF	—				
	14	Jessica Honkonen	Finland	DNF	—				
	18	Ekaterina Tkachenko	Russia	DNF	—				
	20	Romane Nicoletta	France	DNF	—				
	21	Maria Shkanova	Belarus	DNF	—				
	22	Kathrin Auer	Austria	DNF	—				
	24	Courtney Altringer	United States	DNF	—				
	27	Danielle Brownell-Patty	United States	DNF	—				
	28	Natalie Knowles	Canada	DNF	—				
	29	Carmen Geyr	Italy	DNF	—				
	30	Thea Grosvold	Norway	DNF	—				
	31	Devin Delaney	United States	DNF	—				
	32	Sofie Carlsson	Sweden	DNF	—				
	33	Claudia Paquin-Ricard	Canada	DNF	—				
	34	Sara Ramentol	Andorra	DNF	—				
	35	Sohvi Virkkula	Finland	DNF	—				
	36	Helena Rapaport	Sweden	DNF	—				
	37	Júlia Bargalló	Spain	DNF	—				
	38	Nadezda Alexeeva	Russia	DNF	—				
	39	Saana Ahonen	Finland	DNF	—				
	44	Sandra Holm	Finland	DNF	—				
	52	Kristína Saalová	Slovakia	DNF	—				
	53	Núria Pau	Spain	DNF	—				
	54	Inda Garin	Spain	DNF	—				
	55	Mariona Boix	Spain	DNF	—				
	56	Choe Jeong-Hyun	South Korea	DNF	—				
	58	Martina Gebert	Switzerland	DNF	—				
	60	Lee Ga-Ram	South Korea	DNF	—				
	62	Daniela Kamenická	Slovakia	DNF	—				
	63	Ko Un-Sori	South Korea	DNF	—				
	65	Audrey Chaperon	Switzerland	DNF	—				
	68	Gaia Martinelli	Italy	DNF	—				
	72	Sun Meng	China	DNF	—				
	73	Helin Gültekin	Turkey	DNF	—				
	75	Alara Ayyıldız	Turkey	DNF	—				
