= Ukraine at the 2015 Winter Universiade =

- IOC code: UKR
- NOC: Sports Students Union of Ukraine
- Website: osvitasport.org

in Granada, Spain and Štrbské Pleso-Osrblie, Slovakia 24 January – 14 February 2015
- Competitors: 52 in 8 sports
- Medals Ranked 13th: Gold 2 Silver 1 Bronze 2 Total 5

Winter Universiade appearances (overview)
- 1993; 1995; 1997; 1999; 2001; 2003; 2005; 2007; 2009; 2011; 2013; 2015; 2017; 2019; 2023; 2025

Ukraine competed at the 2015 Winter Universiade in Granada, Spain, and Štrbské Pleso/Osrblie, Slovakia. The Ukrainian team consisted of 52 athletes (13th team by number of athletes) who competed in alpine skiing, biathlon, cross-country skiing, figure skating, Nordic combined, short track speed skating, ski jumping, and snowboarding. The team was not represented in curling, freestyle skiing, and ice hockey. Ukraine won 5 medals (all in biathlon) and shared 13th rank with Austria.

== Competitors ==
At the Games, 52 Ukrainian athletes took part. The team included six Olympians (Maryna Antsybor, Oleksiy Krasovsky, Viktor Pasichnyk, Ruslan Perekhoda, Kateryna Serdiuk, and Sofiya Vlasova).

Sport	Men	Women	Total
Alpine skiing	3	2	5
Biathlon	5	6	11
Cross-country skiing	6	6	12
Figure skating	1	3	4
Nordic combined	3	—	3
Short-track speed skating	4	4	8
Ski jumping	5	—	5
Snowboarding	4	—	4
Total	31	21	52

== Medalists ==
Medal	Name	Sport	Event	Date
Gold	Dmytro Rusinov	Biathlon	Men's individual	January 25
Gold	Vitaliy Kilchytskyy	Biathlon	Men's mass start	January 31
Silver	Dmytro Rusinov	Biathlon	Men's mass start	January 31
Bronze	Yuliya Brygynets; Iana Bondar; Ruslan Tkalenko; Dmytro Rusinov	Biathlon	Mixed relay	January 30
Bronze	Iana Bondar	Biathlon	Women's mass start	January 31

Medals by sport
Sport	1st place, gold medalist(s)	2nd place, silver medalist(s)	3rd place, bronze medalist(s)	Total
Biathlon	2	1	2	5

Medals by date
Day	Date	1st place, gold medalist(s)	2nd place, silver medalist(s)	3rd place, bronze medalist(s)	Total
Day 1	January 25	1	0	0	1
Day 2	January 26	0	0	0	0
Day 3	January 27	0	0	0	0
Day 4	January 28	0	0	0	0
Day 5	January 29	0	0	0	0
Day 6	January 30	0	0	1	1
Day 7	January 31	1	1	1	3
Day 8	February 1	0	0	0	0
Day 9	February 5	0	0	0	0
Day 10	February 6	0	0	0	0
Day 11	February 7	0	0	0	0
Day 12	February 8	0	0	0	0
Day 13	February 9	0	0	0	0
Day 14	February 10	0	0	0	0
Day 15	February 11	0	0	0	0
Day 16	February 12	0	0	0	0
Day 17	February 13	0	0	0	0
Day 18	February 14	0	0	0	0
Total		2	1	2	5

== Alpine skiing ==
=== Men ===
Athlete	Event	Final rank
Andriy Mariichyn	Super-G	41
Andriy Mariichyn	Giant slalom	50
Andriy Mariichyn	Slalom	27
Andriy Mariichyn	Combined	26
Andriy Mariichyn	Combined classification	8
Ihor Ham	Super-G	39
Ihor Ham	Giant slalom	51
Ihor Ham	Slalom	DNF
Ihor Ham	Combined	DNF
Taras Kovbasnyuk	Super-G	40
Taras Kovbasnyuk	Giant slalom	DNF
Taras Kovbasnyuk	Slalom	26
Taras Kovbasnyuk	Combined	27
Taras Kovbasnyuk	Combined classification	15

=== Women ===
Athlete	Event	Final rank
Roksana Tymchenko	Super-G	43
Roksana Tymchenko	Giant slalom	27
Roksana Tymchenko	Slalom	35
Roksana Tymchenko	Combined	23
Roksana Tymchenko	Combined classification	11
Daria Ovchinikova	Super-G	7

== Biathlon ==
=== Men ===
Athlete	Event	Final rank
Dmytro Rusinov	Sprint	12
Dmytro Rusinov	Pursuit	11
Dmytro Rusinov	Mass start	2nd place, silver medalist(s)
Dmytro Rusinov	Individual	1st place, gold medalist(s)
Vitaliy Kilchytskyy	Sprint	17
Vitaliy Kilchytskyy	Pursuit	18
Vitaliy Kilchytskyy	Mass start	1st place, gold medalist(s)
Vitaliy Kilchytskyy	Individual	12
Ruslan Tkalenko	Sprint	6
Ruslan Tkalenko	Pursuit	15
Ruslan Tkalenko	Mass start	10
Ruslan Tkalenko	Individual	8
Vasyl Potapenko	Sprint	5
Vasyl Potapenko	Pursuit	8
Vasyl Potapenko	Mass start	27
Vasyl Potapenko	Individual	15
Oleksii Kravchenko	Sprint	30
Oleksii Kravchenko	Pursuit	25
Oleksii Kravchenko	Mass start	17
Oleksii Kravchenko	Individual	19

=== Women ===
Athlete	Event	Final rank
Iana Bondar	Sprint	8
Iana Bondar	Pursuit	5
Iana Bondar	Mass start	3rd place, bronze medalist(s)
Iana Bondar	Individual	15
Yuliya Brygynets	Sprint	7
Yuliya Brygynets	Pursuit	7
Yuliya Brygynets	Mass start	4
Yuliya Brygynets	Individual	25
Alla Gylenko	Sprint	10
Alla Gylenko	Pursuit	12
Alla Gylenko	Mass start	27
Alla Gylenko	Individual	12
Nadiia Bielkina	Sprint	18
Nadiia Bielkina	Pursuit	15
Nadiia Bielkina	Mass start	8
Nadiia Bielkina	Individual	18
Kristina Lytvynenko	Sprint	11
Kristina Lytvynenko	Pursuit	14
Kristina Lytvynenko	Mass start	17
Kristina Lytvynenko	Individual	27
Iryna Behan	Sprint	34
Iryna Behan	Pursuit	LAP
Iryna Behan	Individual	26

=== Mixed ===
Athlete	Event	Final rank
Yuliya Brygynets; Iana Bondar; Ruslan Tkalenko; Dmytro Rusinov	Mixed relay	3rd place, bronze medalist(s)

== Cross country skiing ==
=== Men ===
Athlete	Event	Final rank
Ruslan Perekhoda	Sprint	27
Ruslan Perekhoda	10 km	28
Ruslan Perekhoda	Mass start	16
Oleksii Krasovskyi	Sprint	13
Oleksii Krasovskyi	10 km	10
Oleg Yoltukhovskyy	Sprint	31
Oleg Yoltukhovskyy	10 km	66
Oleg Yoltukhovskyy	Mass start	29
Kostyantyn Yaremenko	Sprint	45
Kostyantyn Yaremenko	10 km	15
Kostyantyn Yaremenko	Mass start	26
Ivan Marchyshak	Sprint	54
Ivan Marchyshak	10 km	57
Andriy Marchenko	Sprint	76
Andriy Marchenko	10 km	35
Andriy Marchenko	Mass start	38

Athlete	Event	Final rank
Oleksii Krasovskyi; Konstyantyn Yaremenko; Oleg Yoltukhovskyy; Ruslan Perekhoda	Relay	6

=== Women ===
Athlete	Event	Final rank
Kateryna Serdyuk	Sprint	17
Kateryna Serdyuk	5 km	4
Kateryna Serdyuk	Mass start	9
Maryna Antsybor	Sprint	8
Maryna Antsybor	5 km	18
Maryna Antsybor	Mass start	5
Oksana Shatalova	Sprint	28
Oksana Shatalova	5 km	31
Oksana Shatalova	Mass start	29
Viktoriia Olekh	Sprint	36
Viktoriia Olekh	5 km	25
Viktoriia Olekh	Mass start	DNS
Oleksandra Andrieieva	Sprint	38
Oleksandra Andrieieva	5 km	42
Oleksandra Andrieieva	Mass start	32
Mariia Nasyko	Sprint	39
Mariia Nasyko	5 km	40
Mariia Nasyko	Mass start	41

Athlete	Event	Final rank
Kateryna Serdyuk; Viktoriia Olekh; Maryna Antsybor	Relay	6

=== Mixed ===
Athlete	Event	Final rank
Andriy Marchenko; Viktoriia Olekh	Mixed team sprint	18
Oleg Yoltukhovskyy; Oksana Shatalova	Mixed team sprint	20

== Figure skating ==
Athlete	Event	SP		FS		Total	
Athlete	Event	Points	Rank	Points	Rank	Points	Rank
Anna Khnychenkova	Ladies' singles	45.90	11 Q	99.97	4	145.87	9
Anastasia Yalovaia	Ladies' singles	32.56	28	did not advance			
Lolita Yermak; Oleksiy Shumsky	Ice dance	42.38	9	68.62	9	111.00	9

== Nordic combined ==
Athlete	Event	Final rank
Viktor Pasichnyk	10 km	4
Viktor Pasichnyk	10 km mass star	9
Ruslan Balanda	10 km	19
Ruslan Balanda	10 km mass star	19
Oleh Vilivchuk	10 km	21
Oleh Vilivchuk	10 km mass start	24

Athlete	Event	Final rank
Oleh Vilivchuk; Ruslan Balanda; Viktor Pasichnyk	Relay	5

== Short track speed skating ==
=== Men ===
Athlete	Event	Final rank
Mykyta Sokolov	500 m	28
Mykyta Sokolov	1000 m	31
Mykyta Sokolov	1500 m	PEN
Stanislav Omelchenko	500 m	30
Stanislav Omelchenko	1000 m	29
Stanislav Omelchenko	1500 m	24
Artem Khmelivskyi	500 m	27
Artem Khmelivskyi	1000 m	30
Artem Khmelivskyi	1500 m	22

Athlete	Event	Final rank
Mykyta Sokolov; Artem Khmelivskyi; Stanislav Omelchenko; Oleksandr Zheltonog	Relay	9

=== Women ===
Athlete	Event	Final rank
Olena Korinchuk	500 m	15
Olena Korinchuk	1000 m	14
Olena Korinchuk	1500 m	16
Sofiya Vlasova	500 m	PEN
Sofiya Vlasova	1000 m	22
Sofiya Vlasova	1500 m	26
Diana Mykhalchuk	500 m	24
Diana Mykhalchuk	1000 m	23
Mariya Dolgopolova	1500 m	20

Athlete	Event	Final rank
Olena Korinchuk; Sofiya Vlasova; Diana Mykhalchuk; Mariya Dolgopolova	Relay	7

== Ski jumping ==
=== Men ===
Athlete	Event	Final rank
Vitaliy Kalinichenko	NH	35
Andriy Klymchuk	NH	38
Andriy Kalinchuk	NH	46
Vatalii Dodyuk	NH	50
Igor Yakibyuk	NH	51

Athlete	Event	Final rank
Ruslan Balanda; Igor Yakibyuk; Vatalii Dodyuk	NH Team	10

== Snowboarding ==
=== Men ===
Athlete	Event	Final rank
Roman Aleksandrovskyy	PGS	7
Roman Aleksandrovskyy	SBX	18
Taras Bihus	PGS	17
Taras Bihus	SBX	26
Anton Karpov	PGS	26
Anton Karpov	SBX	27
Yevheniy Huliy	PGS	23

== See also ==
- Ukraine at the 2015 Summer Universiade

== Sources ==
- Results book
- Results
