= Biathlon at the 2015 Winter Universiade – Men's 10 km sprint =

Sports

The men's 10 km sprint competition of the 2015 Winter Universiade was held at the National Biathlon Centre in Osrblie on January 27.

== Results ==
Rank	Bib	Name	Country	Time	Penalties (P+S)	Deficit
1st place, gold medalist(s)	39	Iaroslav Ivanov	Russia	23:17.3	1 (0+1)	
2nd place, silver medalist(s)	40	Maksim Burtasov	Russia	23:30.7	1 (0+1)	+13.4
3rd place, bronze medalist(s)	1	Yuri Shopin	Russia	23:32.2	2 (0+2)	+14.9
4	15	Michal Krčmář	Czech Republic	23:41.8	2 (1+1)	+24.5
5	34	Vasyl Potapenko	Ukraine	23:42.2	0 (0+0)	+24.9
6	29	Ruslan Tkalenko	Ukraine	24:03.1	1 (0+1)	+45.8
7	13	Maxim Braun	Kazakhstan	24:09.4	0 (0+0)	+52.1
8	26	Stanislav Pershikov	Russia	24:18.6	3 (2+1)	+1:01.3
9	24	Vassilliy Podkorytov	Kazakhstan	24:22	1 (0+1)	+1:04.7
10	9	Michal Kubaliak	Slovakia	24:23.6	1 (0+1)	+1:06.3
11	41	Vincent Mathieu	France	24:23.7	1 (0+1)	+1:06.4
12	7	Dmytro Rusinov	Ukraine	24:25	2 (1+1)	+1:07.7
13	35	Håkon Svaland	Norway	24:31.2	3 (1+2)	+1:13.9
14	18	Ole Martin Erdal	Norway	24:32.3	2 (1+1)	+1;15
15	36	Michal Sima	Slovakia	24:34.6	2 (1+1)	+1:17.3
16	4	Yohan Huillier	France	24;38.5	2 (1+1)	+1:21.2
17	19	Vitaliy Kilchytskyy	Ukraine	24:46.7	4 (2+2)	+1:29.4
18	48	Oleg Kolodiichuk	Russia	24:47.8	2 (1+1)	+1:30.5
19	53	Maksim Ramanouski	Belarus	24:53.9	1 (0+1)	+1:36.6
20	50	Tommy Grøtte	Norway	25:07.6	3 (0+3)	+1:50.3
21	2	Chris Haugen	Norway	25:12.4	2 (0+2)	+1:55.1
22	43	Timur Khamitgatin	Kazakhstan	25:15.2	1 (1+0)	+1:57.9
23	52	Sergey Neverov	Russia	25:23.7	4 (1+3)	+2:06.4
24	37	Henrich Lonsky	Slovakia	25:28	2 (0+2)	+2:10.7
24	46	Dany Chavoutier	France	25:28	3 (1+2)	+2:10.7
26	54	Thibaut Ogier	France	25:30.5	1 (0+1)	+2:13.2
27	8	Sami Orpana	Finland	25:34.6	3 (0+3)	+2:17.3
28	44	Aliaksej Abromchyk	Belarus	25:41.7	0 (0+0)	+2:24.4
29	56	Aleksander Piech	Poland	25:42	1 (0+1)	+2;24.7
30	55	Oleksii Kravchenko	Ukraine	25:42.4	0 (0+0)	+2:25.1
31	32	Kamil Cymerman	Poland	25:56.5	2 (0+2)	+2:39.2
32	17	René Bevelaqua	Slovakia	26:15.5	2 (1+1)	+2:58.2
33	49	Juraj Valenta	Slovakia	26:36.6	3 (2+1)	+3:19.5
34	38	Henri Lehtomaa	Finland	26;38.8	4 (1+3)	+3:21.5
35	14	Tanaka Hokuto	Japan	26:56.7	3 (2+1)	+3:39.4
36	33	Ruslan Bessov	Kazakhstan	26:56.9	4 (2+2)	+3:39.6
37	30	Michal Žák	Czech Republic	26:58.2	2 (0+2)	+3:40.9
38	42	Son Sung-rack	South Korea	27:03.1	3 (1+2)	+3:45.8
39	6	Krzysztof Guzik	Poland	27;15.4	3 (1+2)	+ 3:58.1
40	51	Alexandr Kulinich	Kazakhstan	27;28.9	2 (0+2)	+4:11.6
41	25	Marcin Piasecki	Poland	27:29.8	5 (4+1)	+4;12.5
42	58	Anton Kastussyov	Kazakhstan	27;32.2	2 (0+2)	+4:14.9
43	22	Ahmet Üstüntaş	Turkey	27:48.6	2 (1+1)	+4:31.3
44	21	Kim Chang-hyun	South Korea	28:03.4	2 (0+2)	+4:46.1
45	47	Marek Kittel	Czech Republic	28;10.4	2 (0+2)	+4:53.1
46	45	Organhazi Civil	Turkey	28:59.5	3 (1+2)	+5:42.2
47	28	Kim Ju-sung	South Korea	29:26.9	2 (2+0)	+6:09.6
48	31	Reagan Mills	Canada	29:28.2	2 (1+1)	+6:10.9
49	3	Loïc Dehottay	Belgium	29:50.2	4 (2+2)	+6:32.9
50	27	Jeremy Flanagan	Australia	29:57.2	3 (1+2)	+6:39.9
51	12	Evan Girard	Canada	30:27.1	3 (1+2)	+7:09.8
52	16	Christian Lorenzi	Italy	30:33	7 (3+4)	+7:15.7
53	10	Vjačeslavs Mihailovis	Latvia	30:34.9	5 (4+1)	+7:17.6
54	11	Sasha Eccleston	Canada	30;40.5	4 (1+3)	+7:23.2
55	5	Adam Buki	Hungary	31:55.5	7 (4+3)	+8:38.2
56	57	Samuel West	Canada	33:32.3	4 (2+2)	+10:15
57	23	Alex Gibson	Australia	33:33	7 (2+5)	+10:15.7
58	20	David Buki	Hungary	33:45.5	6 (4+2)	+10:28.2
