= Alpine skiing at the 2015 Winter Universiade – Women's combined =

The women's combined competition of the 2015 Winter Universiade was held at Universiade slope, Sierra Nevada, Spain on February 7, 2015.

== Results ==
Rank	Bib	Name	Nation	Super-G	Rank	Slalom	Rank	Total	Behind
1st place, gold medalist(s)	12	Daria Ovchinnikova	Russia	1:02.49	3	47.31	10	1:49.8	
2nd place, silver medalist(s)	13	Pavla Klicnarová	Czech Republic	1:02.79	5	47.27	9	1:50.06	+0.26
3rd place, bronze medalist(s)	29	Maren Byrkjeland	Norway	1:03.86	16	46.35	2	1:50.21	+0.41
4	43	Kristine Fausa Aasberg	Norway	1:03.6	12	46.62	6	1;50.22	+0.42
5	4	Jana Gantnerová	Slovakia	1:04.22	22	46.36	3	1:50.58	+0.78
6	45	Júlia Bargalló	Spain	1:04.15	20	46.64	7	1;50.79	+0.99
7	20	Mukogawa Sakurako	Japan	1:04.69	26	46.18	1	1:50.87	+1.07
8	27	Victoria Martel-Stevens	Canada	1:30.08	15	47.50	12	1:51.3	+1.5
9	25	Gaia Martinelli	Italy	1:03.68	13	47.64	14	1:51.32	+1.52
9	15	Maria Bedareva	Russia	1:02.38	2	48,94	17	1:51.32	+1.52
9	8	Tereza Kmochová	Czech Republic	1:03.08	8	48.24	15	1:51.32	+1.52
12	5	Carmina Pallas	Andorra	1:03.06	7	48.31	16	1:51.37	+1.57
13	11	Maria Shkanova	Belarus	1:04.55	25	46.97	8	1:51.52	+1.72
14	41	Sohvi Virkkula	Finland	1:05.32	27	46.49	4	1:51.81	+2.01
15	16	Daniela Kamenická	Slovakia	1:05.6	30	46.6	5	1:52.2	+2.4
16	17	Nina Halme	Finland	1:02.9	6	49.42	18	1:52.32	+2.52
17	36	Inda Garin	Spain	1:05.39	28	47.31	10	1:52.7	+2.9
18	35	Veronika Rudolfová	Czech Republic	1:05.73	32	47.62	13	1:53.35	+3.55
19	22	Olga Pogrebitskaya	Russia	1:03.25	10	50.69	19	1:53.94	+4.14
20	48	Jessica Honkonen	Finland	1:05.62	31	52.39	23	1:58.01	+8.21
21	30	Lee Hyun-Ji	South Korea	1:08.87	38	51.07	20	1:59.94	+10.14
22	33	Kim Seo-Hyun	South Korea	1:09.8	41	51.85	21	2:01.65	+11.85
23	47	Roksana Tymchenko	Ukraine	1:13.91	43	52.06	22	2:05.97	+16.17
24	44	Lee Ga-Ram	South Korea	1:12.97	42	57.9	24	2:10.87	+21.07
25	37	Martina Gebert	Switzerland	1:04.42	23	1:12.93	25	2:17.35	+27.55
26	6	Lisa Pfeifer	Italy	1:03.19	9	1:33.89	26	2:37.08	+47.28
	1	Stephanie Gould	Canada	1:03.51	11	DNF	—		
	2	Kristína Saalová	Slovakia	1:04.51	24	DNF	—		
	7	Lucie Piccard	France	1:04.01	19	DNF	—		
	9	Bára Straková	Czech Republic	1:04	=17	DNF	—		
	10	Aleksandra Prokopyeva	Russia	1:02.56	10	DNF	—		
	14	Karolina Chrapek	Poland	1:02.04	1	DNF	—		
	18	Nadezda Alexeeva	Russia	1:03.68	=13	DNF	—		
	31	Choi Jeong-Hyeon	South Korea	1:08.99	39	DNF	—		
	32	Magdalena Klusak	Poland	1:07.64	37	DNF	—		
	34	Núria Pau	Spain	1:04.16	21	DNF	—		
	38	Saana Ahonen	Finland	1:05.95	33	DNF	—		
	39	Sandra Holm	Finland	1:05.98	34	DNF	—		
	40	Mariana Boix	Spain	1:05.42	29	DNF	—		
	42	Ko Un-Sori	South Korea	1:14.24	44	DNF	—		
	46	Ekaterina Popova	Russia	1:06.23	35	DNF	—		
	21	Arai Makiko	Japan	1:04	=17	DSQ	—		
	26	Thea Grosvold	Norway	1:06.65	36	DSQ	—		
	28	Noh Jin-Soul	South Korea	1:09.01	40	DSQ	—		
	3	Johanna Bœuf	France	DNF	—				
	19	Sara Ramentol	Andorra	DNF	—				
	23	Romane Nicoletta	France	DNF	—				
	24	Helena Rapaport	Sweden	DNF	—				
