= Alpine skiing at the 2015 Winter Universiade – Women's super-G =

The women's super-G competition of the 2015 Winter Universiade was held at Universiade slope, Sierra Nevada, Spain on February 6, 2015.

== Results ==
Rank	Bib	Name	Country	Time	Difference
1st place, gold medalist(s)	19	Kristine Fausa Aasberg	Norway	1:26.61	
2nd place, silver medalist(s)	3	Karolina Chrapek	Poland	1:27.25	+0.64
3rd place, bronze medalist(s)	8	Helena Rapaport	Sweden	1:27.43	+0.82
4	9	Aleksandra Prokopyeva	Russia	1:27.5	+0.89
5	4	Maria Bedareva	Russia	1:27.9	+1.29
6	13	Carmina Pallas	Andorra	1:28.03	+1.42
7	10	Daria Ovchinikova	Ukraine	1:28.29	+1.68
8	22	Maren Nessen Byrkjeland	Norway	1:28.61	+2.00
9	25	Arai Makiko	Japan	1:28.81	+2.2
10	11	Nina Halme	Finland	1:28.83	+2.22
11	1	Nadezda Alexeeva	Russia	1:28.89	+2.28
12	16	Lisa Pfeifer	Italy	1:29	+2.39
13	5	Pavla Klicnarová	Czech Republic	1:29.24	+2.63
14	18	Lucie Piccard	France	1:29.34	+2.73
15	6	Johanna Bœuf	France	1:29.38	+2.77
16	2	Victoria Stevens	Canada	1:29.68	+3.07
17	20	Romane Nicoletta	France	1:29.88	+3.27
18	14	Sara Ramentol	Andorra	1:29.98	+3.37
19	32	Núria Pau	Spain	1:30.16	+3.55
20	28	Tereza Kmochová	Czech Republic	1:30.27	+3.66
21	12	Jana Gantnerová	Slovakia	1:30.39	+3.78
22	24	Júlia Bargalló	Spain	1:30.7	+4.09
23	17	Maria Shkanova	Belarus	1:30.72	+4.11
24	23	Kristína Saalová	Slovakia	1:30.8	+4.19
25	34	Martina Gebert	Switzerland	1:30.85	+4.24
26	21	Bára Straková	Czech Republic	1:30.91	+4.3
27	7	Olga Pogrebitskaya	Russia	1:30.99	+4.38
28	33	Gaia Martinelli	Italy	1:31.59	+4.98
29	35	Inda Garin	Spain	1:31.75	+5.14
30	30	Sohvi Virkkula	Finland	1:31.82	+5.21
31	37	Mariona Boix	Spain	1:32.28	+5.67
32	45	Jessica Honkonen	Finland	1:32.83	+6.22
33	29	Daniela Kamenická	Slovakia	1:33.27	+6.66
34	43	Veronika Rudolfová	Czech Republic	1:33.84	+7.23
35	40	Sandra Holm	Finland	1:34.35	+7.74
36	27	Thea Grosvold	Norway	1:35.13	+8.52
37	41	Magdalena Klusak	Poland	1:36.53	+9.92
38	42	Kim Seo-Hyun	South Korea	1:38.77	+12.16
39	36	Lee Hyun-Ji	South Korea	1:39.41	+12.8
40	39	Noh Jin-Soul	South Korea	1:41.07	+14.46
41	38	Choe Jeong-Hyeon	South Korea	1:43.26	+16.65
42	46	Lee Ga-Ram	South Korea	1:46.88	+20.27
43	48	Roksana Tymchenko	Ukraine	1:47.29	+20.68
	15	Stephanie Gould	Canada	DNF	
	26	Mukogawa Sakurako	Japan	DNF	
	31	Ekaterina Popova	Russia	DNF	
	47	Ko Un-Sori	South Korea	DNF	
	44	Saana Ahonen	Finland	DSQ	
