= Biathlon at the 2015 Winter Universiade – Men's 20 km individual =

The men's 20 km individual competition of the 2015 Winter Universiade was held at the National Biathlon Centre in Osrblie on January 25.

== Results ==
Rank	Bib	Name	Country	Time	Penalties (P+S+P+S)	Deficit
1st place, gold medalist(s)	5	Dmytro Rusinov	Ukraine	49:52.8	1 (0+0+1+0)	0.0
2nd place, silver medalist(s)	39	Vadim Filimonov	Russia	50:15.4	2 (1+0+0+1)	+22.6
3rd place, bronze medalist(s)	40	Yuri Shopin	Russia	51:18.0	3 (0+1+1+1)	+1:25.2
4	7	Oleg Kolodiichuk	Russia	51:22.3	1 (0+0+1+0)	+1:29.5
5	6	Vincent Mathieu	France	51:25.7	2 (1+0+1+0)	+1:32.9
6	2	Maksim Ramanouski	Belarus	51:49.3	0 (0+0+0+0)	+1:56.5
7	25	Maxim Braun	Kazakhstan	52:19.1	2 (0+2+0+0)	+2:26.3
8	38	Ruslan Tkalenko	Ukraine	52:20.1	3 (1+0+1+1)	+2:27.3
9	53	Chris Endre Haugen	Norway	52:20.3	1 (0+1+0+0)	+2:27.5
10	19	Ole Martin Erdal	Norway	52:28.1	3 (1+0+0+2)	+2:35.3
11	26	Maksim Burtasov	Russia	52:30.8	5 (1+2+2+0)	+2:38.0
12	43	Vitaliy Kilchytskyy	Ukraine	52:32.2	4 (1+0+1+2)	+2:39.4
13	49	Arkadii Menshikov	Russia	52:50.0	2 (1+1+0+0)	+2:57.2
14	46	Michal Sima	Slovakia	53:16.3	3 (0+1+0+2)	+3:23.5
15	3	Vasyl Potapenko	Ukraine	53:16.8	2 (1+0+1+0)	+3:24.0
16	42	Sami Orpana	Finland	53:19.3	3 (0+1+0+2)	+3:26.5
17	9	Vassiliy Podkorytov	Kazakhstan	53:30.0	3 (0+1+1+1)	+3:37.2
18	55	Stanislav Pershikov	Russia	53:47.1	5 (2+2+0+1)	+3:54.3
19	50	Oleksii Kravchenko	Ukraine	53:48.2	1 (0+0+1+0)	+3:55.2
20	32	Timur Khamitgatin	Kazakhstan	54:17.7	4 (2+1+1+0)	+4:24.9
21	27	Håkon Svaland	Norway	54:19.8	5 (1+3+0+1)	+4:27.0
22	44	Tommy Grøtte	Norway	54:46.1	6 (0+1+2+3)	+4:53.3
23	22	Michal Kubaliak	Slovakia	55:01.4	4 (2+1+1+0)	+5:08.6
24	41	Aliaksei Abromchyk	Belarus	55:19.2	1 (0+0+0+1)	+5:26.4
25	29	Michal Žák	Czech Republic	55:37.6	3 (0+0+2+1)	+5:44.8
26	33	Ahmet Üstüntaş	Turkey	55:50.1	0 (0+0+0+0)	+5:57.3
27	18	Dany Chavoutier	France	55:59.0	6 (1+1+1+3)	+6:06.2
28	31	Ruslan Bessov	Kazakhstan	56:12.0	3 (0+1+2+0)	+6:19.2
29	37	Marcin Piasecki	Poland	57:15.8	4 (0+1+1+2)	+7:23.0
30	57	Son Sung-rack	South Korea	57:21.3	3 (0+1+0+2)	+7:28.5
31	1	Marek Kittel	Czech Republic	58:10.1	3 (0+2+0+1)	+8:17.3
32	36	Matej Bevelaqua	Slovakia	58:10.9	4 (0+2+1+1)	+8:18.1
33	28	Thibaut Ogier	France	58:19.1	6 (1+1+3+1)	+8:26.3
34	4	Krzysztof Guzik	Poland	58:31.4	4 (3+1+0+0)	+8:38.6
35	51	Yohan Huillier	France	58:38.2	7 (0+3+1+3)	+8:45.4
36	47	Juraj Valenta	Slovakia	58:55.1	6 (2+2+1+1)	+9:02.3
37	12	Henrich Lonsky	Slovakia	59:22.0	7 (2+4+0+1)	+9:29.2
38	56	Aleksander Piech	Poland	59:26.4	6 (1+0+2+3)	+9:33.6
39	14	Kamil Cymerman	Poland	59:46.6	6 (1+2+1+2)	+9:53.8
40	52	Anton Kastussyov	Kazakhstan	1:00:50.7	5 (2+2+0+1)	+10:57.9
41	8	Henri Lehtomaa	Finland	1:01:00.3	9 (2+1+2+4)	+11:07.5
42	15	Hokuto Tanaka	Japan	1:01:31.2	9 (1+5+1+2)	+11:38.4
43	11	Orhangazi Civil	Turkey	1:02:26.7	5 (2+1+1+1)	+12:33.9
44	24	Christian Lorenzi	Italy	1:03:12.5	5 (1+2+0+2)	+13:19.7
45	23	Loïc Dehottay	Belgium	1:03:52.7	4 (0+2+1+1)	+13:59.9
46	20	Evan Girard	Canada	1:04:50.8	6 (1+3+1+1)	+14:58.0
47	17	Kim Chang-hyun	South Korea	1:05:26.7	6 (2+0+2+2)	+15:33.9
48	34	Kim Ju-sung	South Korea	1:05:31.9	5 (2+2+1+0)	+15:39.1
49	13	Vjačeslavs Mihailovs	Latvia	1:08:25.4	10 (3+2+3+2)	+18:32.6
50	10	Jeremy Flanagan	Australia	1:09:02.9	7 (3+0+2+2)	+19:10.1
51	21	David Buki	Hungary	1:09:52.3	4 (0+1+1+2)	+19:59.5
52	16	Sasha Eccleston	Canada	1:10:51.6	10 (3+2+3+2)	+20:58.8
53	30	Adam Buki	Hungary	1:11:32.5	9 (3+3+1+2)	+21:39.7
54	45	Alex Gibson	Australia	1:13:14.1	13 (4+2+3+4)	+23:21.3
	48	Reagan Mills	Canada	DSQ	6 (0+2+1+3)	
	35	Samuel West	Canada	DNS		
	54	Alexandr Kulinich	Kazakhstan	DNS		
