= Short-track speed skating at the 2015 Winter Universiade – Women's 1000 metres =

The women's 1000 metres competition of the Short track speed skating at the 2015 Winter Universiade was held at the Universiade Igloo, Granada on February 13.

== Results ==
=== Heats ===
Q — qualified for Quarterfinals
QT- qualified by time
ADV — advanced
PEN — penalty

Rank	Heat	Bib	Name	Country	Time	Notes
1	1	22	Son Ha-kyung	South Korea	1:38.016	Q
2	1	14	Kikuchi Yuki	Japan	1:38.909	Q
3	1	34	Olena Korinchuk	Ukraine	1:52.372	ADV
4	1	39	Kristen Santos	United States	No Time	
1	2	5	Caroline Truchon	Canada	1:33.76	Q
2	2	17	Yoshida Marie	Japan	1:33.81	Q
3	2	38	Katherine Ralston	United States	1:33.875	QT
4	2	25	Monika Grządkowska	Poland	1:34.855	
1	3	24	Agnė Sereikaitė	Lithuania	1:32.116	Q
2	3	7	Ji Xue	China	1:32.246	Q
3	3	37	Alexis Burkholder	United States	1:36.591	
4	3	28	Ekaterina Baranok	Russia	No Time	
1	4	2	Namasthee Camille Harris-Gauthier	Canada	1:39.335	Q
2	4	12	Ylenia Tota	Italy	1:41.285	Q
3	4	35	Diana Mykhalchuk	Ukraine	1:42.5	
4	4	32	Anastasia Surkova	Russia	1:50.446	
1	5	6	Han Yutong	China	2:01.47	Q
2	5	13	Kikuchi Moemi	Japan	2:01.497	Q
3	5	26	Katarzyna Iwach	Poland	2:01.775	
1	6	19	Kim A-lang	South Korea	1:33.424	Q
2	6	9	Lin Meng	China	1:33.549	Q
3	6	27	Agnieszka Tawrel	Poland	1:37.033	
4	6	23	Evita Krievāne	Latvia	1:37.136	
1	7	20	Lee Eun-byul	South Korea	1:34.741	Q
2	7	4	Keri Elizabeth Morrison	Canada	1:34.881	Q
3	7	31	Liya Stepanova	Russia	1:35.928	QT
4	7	36	Sofiya Vlasova	Ukraine	1:37.16	

=== Quarterfinals ===
Q — qualified for Semifinals
ADV — advanced
PEN — penalty

Rank	Heat	Bib	Name	Country	Time	Notes
1	1	24	Agnė Sereikaitė	Lithuania	1:32.762	Q
2	1	7	Ji Xue	China	1:32.961	Q
3	1	31	Liya Stepanova	Russia	1:34.833	
4	1	17	Yoshida Marie	Japan	1:35.501	
5	1	34	Olena Korinchuk	Ukraine	1:36.477	
1	2	22	Son Ha-kyung	South Korea	1:34.448	Q
2	2	9	Lin Meng	China	1:34.567	Q
3	2	13	Kikuchi Moemi	Japan	1:34.854	
4	2	5	Caroline Truchon	Canada	1:35.127	
1	3	20	Lee Eun-byul	South Korea	1:38.107	Q
2	3	2	Namasthee Camille Harris-Gauthier	Canada	1:38.196	Q
3	3	14	Kikuchi Yuki	Japan	1:38.353	
4	3	12	Ylenia Tota	Italy	1:40.347	
1	4	19	Kim A-lang	South Korea	1:33.394	Q
2	4	6	Han Yutong	China	1:33.464	Q
3	4	4	Keri Elizabeth Morrison	Canada	1:33.653	
4	4	38	Katherine Ralston	United States	No Time	

=== Semifinals ===
QA — qualified for Final A
QB - qualified for Final B
ADV — advanced
PEN — penalty

Rank	Heat	Bib	Name	Country	Time	Notes
1	1	22	Son Ha-kyung	South Korea	1:37.892	QA
2	1	19	Kim A-lang	South Korea	1:37.954	QA
3	1	2	Namasthee Camille Harris-Gauthier	Canada	1:38.104	QB
4	1	7	Ji Xue	China	1:38.971	QB
1	2	24	Agnė Sereikaitė	Lithuania	1:31.131	QA
2	2	20	Lee Eun-byul	South Korea	1:33.991	QA
3	2	9	Lin Meng	China	1:34.278	QB
	2	6	Han Yutong	China		PEN

=== Final B (classification round) ===
Rank	Bib	Name	Country	Time	Notes
5	7	Ji Xue	China	1:59.188	
	2	Namasthee Camille Harris-Gauthier	Canada		PEN
	9	Lin Meng	China		PEN

=== Final A (medal round) ===
Rank	Bib	Name	Country	Time	Notes
1st place, gold medalist(s)	19	Kim A-lang	South Korea	1:37.321	
2nd place, silver medalist(s)	20	Lee Eun-byul	South Korea	1:37.488	
3rd place, bronze medalist(s)	22	Son Ha-kyung	South Korea	1:37.705	
4	24	Agnė Sereikaite	Lithuania	1:38.247	
