= Short-track speed skating at the 2015 Winter Universiade – Women's 3000 metres relay =

The women's 3000 metres relay competition of the Short track speed skating at the 2015 Winter Universiade was held at the Universiade Igloo, Granada the semifinal was held on February 12, and final was held on February 13.

== Results ==
=== Semifinals ===
QA — qualified for Final A
QB - qualified for Final B
ADV — advanced
PEN — penalty

Rank	Heat	Country	Bib	Name	Time	Notes
1	1	China	6; 7; 9; 11	Han Yutong; Ji Xue; Lin Meng; Xu Moyuan	4:17.798	QA
2	1	Canada	1; 2; 3; 5	Joanie Gervais; Namasthee Camille Harris-Gauthier; Jamie Macdonald; Caroline Truchon	4:19.564	QA
3	1	Ukraine	33; 34; 35; 36	Mariya Dolgopolova; Olena Korinchuk; Diana Mykhalchuk; Sofiya Vlasova	4:26.769	QB
4	1	United States	37; 38; 39; 41	Alexis Burkholder; Katherine Ralston; Kristen Santos; Jerebelle Yutangco	4:39.957	QB
1	2	South Korea	18; 20; 21; 22	Ahn Se-jung; Lee Eun-byul; Noh Ah-reum; Son Ha-kyung	4:21.143	QA
2	2	Japan	13; 14; 16; 17	Kikuchi Moemi; Kikuchi Yuki; Otsubo Saki; Yoshida Marie	4:21.244	QA
3	2	Russia	28; 30; 31; 32	Ekaterina Baranok; Natalia Plugina; Liya Stepanova; Anastasia Surkova	4:23.963	QB

=== Final B (classification round) ===
Rank	Country	Bib	Name	Time	Notes
5	Russia	28; 29; 30; 32	Ekaterina Baranok; Vera Milyaeva; Natalia Plugina; Anastasia Surkova	4:23.455	
6	United States	37; 38; 39; 41	Alexis Burkholder; Katherine Ralston; Kristen Santos; Jerebelle Yutangco	4:27.211	
7	Ukraine	33; 34; 35; 36	Mariya Dolgopolova; Olena Korinchuk; Diana Mykhalchuk; Sofiya Vlasova	4:38.483	

=== Final A (medal round) ===
Rank	Country	Bib	Name	Time	Notes
1st place, gold medalist(s)	China	6; 7; 8; 9	Han Yutong; Ji Xue; Li Hongshuang; Lin Meng	4:19.01	
2nd place, silver medalist(s)	South Korea	19; 20; 21; 22	Kim A-lang; Lee Eun-byul; Noh Ah-rum; Son Ha-kyung	4:19.289	
3rd place, bronze medalist(s)	Canada	1; 2; 4; 5	Joanie Gervais; Namasthee Camille Harris-Gauthier; Keri Elizabeth Morrison; Caroline Truchon	4:20.089	
4	Japan	13; 14; 16; 17	Kikuchi Moemi; Kikuchi Yuki; Otsubo Saki; Yoshida Marie	4:21.28	
