= Alpine skiing at the 2015 Winter Universiade – Women's combined classification =

The women's combined classification competition of the 2015 Winter Universiade was held at Universiade slope, Sierra Nevada, Spain on February 13, 2015.

== Results ==
| Rank | Name | Nation | Super-G | Combined | Giant Slalom | Slalom | Total |
|---|---|---|---|---|---|---|---|
| 1st place, gold medalist(s) | Maren Nessen Byrkjeland | Norway | 96 | 110 | 98 | 84 | 388 |
| 2nd place, silver medalist(s) | Carmina Pallas | Andorra | 100 | 89 | 110 | 88 | 387 |
| 3rd place, bronze medalist(s) | Jana Gantnerová | Slovakia | 80 | 103 | 103 | 86 | 372 |
| 4 | Tereza Kmochová | Czech Republic | 81 | 94 | 89 | 83 | 347 |
| 5 | Kristine Fausa Aasberg | Norway | 120 | 106 | 120 | | 346 |
| 6 | Veronika Rudolfová | Czech Republic | 67 | 83 | 82 | 90 | 322 |
| 7 | Karolina Chrapek | Poland | 115 | | 94 | 96 | 305 |
| 8 | Lucie Piccard | France | 87 | | 106 | 103 | 296 |
| 9 | Kim Seo-hyun | South Korea | 63 | 79 | 78 | 64 | 284 |
| 10 | Pavla Klicnarová | Czech Republic | 88 | 115 | | 77 | 280 |
| 11 | Roksana Tymchenko | Ukraine | 58 | 78 | 74 | 66 | 276 |
| 12 | Victoria Martel-Stevens | Canada | 85 | 96 | | 94 | 275 |
| 13 | Johanna Bœuf | France | 86 | | 88 | 92 | 266 |
| 14 | Lisa Pfeifer | Italy | 89 | 75 | 100 | | 264 |
| 14 | Maria Shkanova | Belarus | 78 | 88 | | 98 | 264 |
| 16 | Jessica Honkonen | Finland | 69 | 81 | | 100 | 250 |
| 17 | Nina Halme | Finland | 92 | 85 | | 70 | 247 |
| 18 | Daniela Kamenická | Slovakia | 68 | 86 | | 73 | 227 |
| 19 | Lee Hyun-ji | South Korea | 62 | 80 | 79 | | 221 |
| 20 | Noh Jin-soul | South Korea | 61 | | 77 | 67 | 205 |
