= Short-track speed skating at the 2015 Winter Universiade – Women's 1500 metres =

The women's 1500 metres competition of the Short track speed skating at the 2015 Winter Universiade was held at the Universiade Igloo, Granada on February 11.

== Results ==
=== Heats ===
Q — qualified for Semifinals
ADV — advanced
PEN — penalty

Rank	Heat	Bib	Name	Country	Time	Notes
1	1	6	Han Yutong	China	No Time	Q
2	1	28	Ekaterina Baranok	Russia	No Time	Q
3	1	23	Evita Krievāne	Latvia	No Time	Q
4	1	36	Sofiya Vlasova	Ukraine	No Time	
5	1	42	Lauren Ziegelmayer	United States	No Time	
1	2	22	Son Ha-Kyung	South Korea	2:36.93	Q
2	2	24	Agnė Sereikaitė	Lithuania	2:37.299	Q
3	2	13	Kikuchi Moemi	Japan	2:37.421	Q
4	2	3	Jamie Louise Macdonald	Canada	2:37.71	
5	2	31	Liya Stupanova	Russia	2:43.537	
6	2	26	Katarzyna Iwach	Poland	2:55.19	
1	3	20	Lee Eun-Byul	South Korea	2:56.662	Q
2	3	2	Namasthee Camille Harris-Gauthier	Canada	2:56.737	Q
3	3	16	Otsubo Saki	Japan	2:57.059	Q
4	3	27	Agnieszka Tawrel	Poland	3:00.268	
5	3	40	Taylor Wentz	United States	3:04.818	
1	4	19	Kim A-Lang	South Korea	2:32.023	Q
2	4	11	Xu Moyuan	China	2:32.139	Q
3	4	29	Vera Milyaeva	Russia	2;32.587	Q
4	4	12	Ylenia Tota	Italy	2:35.204	
5	4	33	Mariya Dolgopolova	Ukraine	2:38.197	
1	5	8	Li Hongshuang	China	2;31.385	Q
2	5	4	Keri Elizabeth Morrison	Canada	2L31.747	Q
3	5	14	Kikuchi Yuki	Japan	2;32.404	Q
4	5	34	Olena Korinchuk	Ukraine	2:33.905	
5	5	25	Monika Grządkowska	Poland	2;33.919	
6	5	41	Jerebelle Yutangco	United States	2:36.809	

=== Semifinals ===
QA — qualified for Finals A
QB — qualified for Finals B
ADV — advanced
PEN — penalty

Rank	Heat	Bib	Name	Country	Time	Notes
1	1	22	Son Ha-Kyung	South Korea	2:38.397	QA
2	1	20	Lee Eun-Byul	South Korea	2:38.713	QA
3	1	28	Ekaterina Baranok	Russia	2;39.059	QB
4	1	2	Namasthee Camille Harris-Gauthier	Canada	2:39.753	QB
5	1	23	Evita Krievāne	Latvia	2;44.653	
1	2	19	Kim A-Lang	South Korea	2:32.134	QA
2	2	6	Han Yutong	China	2:32.396	QA
3	2	24	Agnė Sereikaitė	Lithuania	2;32.865	QB
4	2	14	Kikuchi Yuki	Japan	2:32.987	QB
5	2	16	Otsubo Saki	Japan	2:36.365	
1	3	4	Keri Elizabeth Morrison	Canada	2:35.466	QA
2	3	8	Li Hongshuang	China	2:35.599	QA
3	3	13	Kikuchi Moemi	Japan	2:36.025	QB
4	3	11	Xu Moyuan	China	2:36.09	QB
5	3	29	Vera Milyaeva	Russia	2:37.198	

=== Finals ===
==== Final B (classification round) ====
Rank	Bib	Name	Country	Time	Notes
7	24	Agnė Sereikaitė	Lithuania	2;33.509	
8	13	Kikuchi Moemi	Japan	2:34.333	
9	28	Ekaterina Baranok	Russia	2:34.403	
10	2	Namasthee Camille Harris-Gauthier	Canada	2;34.657	
11	14	Kikuchi Yuki	Japan	2:34.763	
	11	Xu Moyuan	China		PEN

==== Final A (medal round) ====
Rank	Bib	Name	Country	Time	Notes
1st place, gold medalist(s)	19	Kim A-Lang	South Korea	2:33.829	
2nd place, silver medalist(s)	20	Lee Eun-Byul	South Korea	2;34.168	
3rd place, bronze medalist(s)	6	Han Yutong	China	2:34.339	
4	4	Keri Elizabeth Morrison	Canada	2;34.36	
5	8	Li Hongshuang	China	2:34.94	
6	22	Son Ha-Kyung	South Korea	2:35.287	
