= Snowboarding at the 2015 Winter Universiade – Men's snowboard cross =

The men's snowboard cross competition of the 2015 Winter Universiade was held at Sulayr Snowpark, Sierra Nevada, Spain at February 6, 2015.

The qualification round and elimination round was completed on February 6.

== Results ==
=== Qualification ===
Rank	Bib	Name	Country	Run 1	Rank	Run 2	Rank	Best	Difference	Notes
1	40	Nikolay Olyunin	Russia	51.73	2	50.82	1	50.82		Q
2	46	Ken Vuagnoux	France	51.15	1	51.39	2	51.15	+0.33	Q
3	43	Nathan Birrien	France	52.08	4	51.68	3	51.68	+0.86	Q
4	41	Alessandro Hämmerle	Austria	52.39	5	51.73	4	51.73	+0.91	Q
5	53	Daniil Dilman	Russia	51.98	3	51.9	5	51.9	+1.08	Q
6	54	Aleksandr Guzachev	Russia	52.54	6	51.92	6	51.92	+1.1	Q
7	48	Hanno Douschan	Austria	52.71	7	52.63	7	52.63	+1.81	Q
8	42	Pierre Ramoin	France	54.75	18	52.99	8	52.99	+2.17	Q
9	50	Fabio Colella	Italy	53.12	8	53.11	9	53.11	+2.29	Q
10	44	Leo Trespeuch	France	53.58	10	53.38	10	53.38	+2.56	Q
11	49	Kevin Klossner	Switzerland	53.41	9	53.72	14	53.41	+2.59	Q
12	39	Dominic Beer	Switzerland	54.27	12	53.42	11	53.42	+2.6	Q
13	45	Dawid Wal	Poland	54.47	15	53.47	12	53.47	+2.65	Q
14	35	Nico Giuntoli Vercellin	Italy	53.73	11	53.69	13	53.69	+2.87	Q
15	77	Mal Prior	United States	54.53	17	53.83	15	53.83	+3.01	Q
16	60	Aleksey Vakurin	Kyrgyzstan	54.42	14	54.13	16	54.13	+3.31	Q
17	76	Lee Jung-hyun	South Korea	54.77	19	54.24	17	54.24	+3.42	Q
18	66	Roman Aleksandrovskyy	Ukraine	54.39	13	54.65	21	54.39	+3.57	Q
19	78	Jake Black	United States	55.47	22	54.39	18	54.39	+3.57	Q
20	55	Marcin Bocian	Poland	54.52	16	54.40	19	54.40	+3.58	Q
21	79	Dylan Bidez	United States	55.80	26	54.55	20	54.55	+3.73	Q
22	58	Matej Bačo	Slovakia	55.70	23	55.20	22	55.20	+4.38	Q
23	74	Denis Podmarev	Russia	55.22	20	55.34	24	55.22	+4.40	Q
24	63	Pavel Vakurin	Kyrgyzstan	55.72	24	55.27	23	55.27	+4.45	Q
25	67	Kang Jong-Won	South Korea	55.38	21	1:00.41	33	55.38	+4.56	Q
26	72	Taras Bihus	Ukraine	55.78	25	55.67	25	55.67	+4.85	Q
27	61	Anton Karpov	Ukraine	55.99	27	55.68	26	55.68	+4.86	Q
28	62	Petr Bohunek	Czech Republic	56.70	29	56.06	27	56.06	+5.24	Q
29	57	Daniel Martinek	Czech Republic	56.19	28	1:00.86	34	56.19	+5.37	Q
30	56	Piotr Bodziony	Poland	59.84	34	56.48	30	56.48	+5.66	Q
31	69	Vladimir Komissarov	Kyrgyzstan	58.13	31	57.52	29	57.52	+6.70	Q
32	68	Oleg Panin	Kazakhstan	57.93	30	58.48	30	57.93	+7.11	Q
33	73	Timur Gubaev	Kyrgyzstan	58.35	32	58.61	31	58.35	+7.53	
34	80	Max Bigley	United States	58.44	33	1:01.35	35	58.44	+7.62	
35	75	Mikheli Tasoshvili	Georgia	1:01.37	35	59.61	32	59.61	+8.79	
	51	Lukas Pachner	Austria							DNS
	52	Glenn de Blois	Netherlands							DNS
	59	Štĕpán Kubičík	Czech Republic							DNS

=== Elimination round ===
==== 1/8 Finals ====
Heat 1

Rank	Bib	Name	Country	Notes
1	1	Nikolay Olyunin	Russia	Q
2	16	Aleksey Vakurin	Kyrgyzstan	Q
3	17	Lee Jung-hyun	South Korea	
4	32	Oleg Panin	Kazakhstan	

Heat 2

Rank	Bib	Name	Country	Notes
1	8	Pierre Ramoin	France	Q
2	9	Fabio Colella	Italy	Q
3	24	Pavel Vakurin	Kyrgyzstan	
4	25	Kang Jong-Won	South Korea	

Heat 3

Rank	Bib	Name	Country	Notes
1	5	Daniil Dilman	Russia	Q
2	12	Dominic Beer	Switzerland	Q
3	21	Dylan Bidez	United States	
4	28	Petr Bohunek	Czech Republic	

Heat 4

Rank	Bib	Name	Country	Notes
1	4	Alessandro Hämmerle	Austria	Q
2	13	Dawid Wal	Poland	Q
3	29	Daniel Martinek	Czech Republic	
4	20	Marcin Bocian	Poland	

Heat 5

Rank	Bib	Name	Country	Notes
1	3	Nathan Birrien	France	Q
2	14	Nico Giuntoli Vercellin	Italy	Q
3	19	Jake Black	United States	
4	30	Piotr Bodziony	Poland	

Heat 6

Rank	Bib	Name	Country	Notes
1	11	Kevin Klossner	Switzerland	Q
2	22	Matej Bačo	Slovakia	Q
3	6	Aleksandr Guzachev	Russia	
4	27	Anton Karpov	Ukraine	

Heat 7

Rank	Bib	Name	Country	Notes
1	7	Hanno Douschan	Austria	Q
2	10	Leo Trespeuch	France	Q
3	23	Denis Podmarev	Russia	
4	26	Taras Bihus	Ukraine	

Heat 8

Rank	Bib	Name	Country	Notes
1	2	Ken Vuagnoux	France	Q
2	15	Mal Prior	United States	Q
3	18	Roman Aleksandrovskyy	Ukraine	
4	31	Vladimir Komissarov	Kyrgyzstan	

==== Quarterfinals ====
Quarterfinal 1

Rank	Bib	Name	Country	Notes
1	8	Pierre Ramoin	France	Q
2	1	Nikolay Olyunin	Russia	Q
3	9	Fabio Colella	Italy	
4	16	Aleksey Vakurin	Kyrgyzstan	

Quarterfinal 2

Rank	Bib	Name	Country	Notes
1	4	Alessandro Hämmerle	Austria	Q
2	5	Daniil Dilman	Russia	Q
3	13	Dawid Wal	Poland	
4	12	Dominic Beer	Switzerland	

Quarterfinal 3

Rank	Bib	Name	Country	Notes
1	3	Nathan Birrien	France	Q
2	11	Kevin Klossner	Switzerland	Q
3	14	Nico Giuntoli Vercellin	Italy	
4	22	Matej Bačo	Slovakia	

Quarterfinal 4

Rank	Bib	Name	Country	Notes
1	2	Ken Vuagnoux	France	Q
2	7	Hanno Douschan	Austria	Q
3	10	Leo Trespeuch	France	
4	15	Mal Prior	United States	

==== Semifinals ====
Semifinal 1

Rank	Bib	Name	Country	Notes
1	1	Nikolay Olyunin	Russia	Q
2	4	Alessandro Hämmerle	Austria	Q
3	8	Pierre Ramoin	France	
4	5	Daniil Dilman	Russia	

Semifinal 2

Rank	Bib	Name	Country	Notes
1	11	Kevin Klossner	Switzerland	Q
2	3	Nathan Birrien	France	Q
3	7	Hanno Douschan	Austria	
4	2	Ken Vuagnoux	France	

==== Finals ====
Small Final

Rank	Bib	Name	Country	Notes
5	8	Pierre Ramoin	France	
6	5	Daniil Dilman	Russia	
7	7	Hanno Douschan	Austria	
8	2	Ken Vuagnoux	France	

Big Final

Rank	Bib	Name	Country	Notes
1st place, gold medalist(s)	1	Nikolay Olyunin	Russia	
2nd place, silver medalist(s)	4	Alessandro Hämmerle	Austria	
3rd place, bronze medalist(s)	3	Nathan Birrien	France	
4	11	Kevin Klossner	Switzerland	
