= Alpine skiing at the 2015 Winter Universiade – Men's combined classification =

The men's combined classification competition of the 2015 Winter Universiade was held at Universiade slope, Sierra Nevada, Spain on February 14, 2015.

== Results ==
Rank	Name	Nation	Super-G	Combined	Giant Slalom	Slalom	Total
1st place, gold medalist(s)	Sandro Boner	Switzerland	110	120	90	94	414
2nd place, silver medalist(s)	Adam Zika	Czech Republic	81	96	79	88	344
3rd place, bronze medalist(s)	Michelangelo Tentori	Italy	120	79	120		319
4	Matej Falat	Slovakia	88	110		115	313
5	Jakub Klusak	Poland	78	89	63	81	311
6	Luca Riorda	Italy	92	106	85		283
7	Youri Mougel	France	83	89		96	268
8	Andriy Mariichyn	Ukraine	60	75	51	74	260
9	Yuri Danilochkin	Belarus	86	92	64		242
10	Miyamoto Shinya	Japan	73	78		85	236
11	Vladimir Siráň	Slovakia	71	87	75		233
12	Evgeniy Tulupov	Russia	81	90	61		232
13	Mateusz Garniewicz	Poland	76	82	65		223
14	Graham Black	United States	78		59	77	214
15	Taras Kovbasnyuk	Ukraine	61	74		75	210
15	Simon Efimov	Russia	70		58	82	210
