= Short-track speed skating at the 2015 Winter Universiade – Women's 500 metres =

The women's 500 metres competition of the Short track speed skating at the 2015 Winter Universiade was held at the Universiade Igloo, Granada on February 12.

== Results ==
Results are from the official FISU results archive.

=== Heats ===
Q — qualified for Quarterfinals
QT- qualified by time
ADV — advanced
PEN — penalty

Rank	Heat	Bib	Name	Country	Time	Notes
1	1	1	Joanie Gervais	Canada	45.056	Q
2	1	34	Olena Korinchuk	Ukraine	45.132	Q
3	1	30	Natalia Plugina	Russia	45.32	QT
4	1	37	Alexis Burkholder	United States	47.001	
1	2	24	Agnė Sereikaitė	Lithuania	44.603	Q
2	2	32	Anastasia Surkova	Russia	45.572	Q
3	2	39	Kristen Santos	United States	47.048	
4	2	35	Diana Mykhalchuk	Ukraine	47.768	
1	3	22	Son Ha-Kyung	South Korea	44.707	Q
2	3	8	Li Hongshuang	China	45.244	Q
3	3	31	Liya Stepanova	Russia	45.446	
	3	3	Jamie Louise Macdonald	Canada		PEN
1	4	20	Lee Eunbyul	South Korea	45.299	Q
2	4	38	Katherine Ralston	United States	45.317	Q
3	4	16	Otsubo Saki	Japan	46.999	
4	4	12	Ylenia Tota	Italy	47.184	
1	5	19	Kim A-Lang	South Korea	44.671	Q
2	5	23	Evita Krievāne	Latvia	47.615	Q
3	5	25	Monika Grządkowska	Poland	47.652	
1	6	6	Han Yutong	China	44.251	Q
2	6	5	Caroline Truchon	Canada	44.822	Q
3	6	17	Yoshida Marie	Japan	45.356	QT
4	6	26	Katarzyna Iwach	Poland	49.245	
1	7	10	Wang Xue	China	44.999	Q
2	7	27	Agnieszka Tawrel	Poland	47.312	Q
3	7	15	Matsushima Joannayoko	Japan	47.487	
	7	36	Sofiia Vlasova	Ukraine		PEN

=== Quarterfinals ===
Q — qualified for Semifinals
ADV — advanced
PEN — penalty

Rank	Heat	Bib	Name	Country	Time	Notes
1	1	6	Han Yutong	China	44.683	Q
2	1	5	Caroline Truchon	Canada	44.931	Q
3	1	17	Yoshida Marie	Japan	No Time	
	1	34	Olena Korinchuk	Ukraine		PEN
1	2	1	Joanie Gervais	Canada	44.786	Q
2	2	38	Katherine Ralston	United States	44.995	Q
3	2	23	Evita Krievāne	Latvia	46.92	
4	2	19	Kim A-Lang	South Korea	No Time	
1	3	8	Li Hong Shuang	China	44.202	Q
2	3	24	Agnė Sereikaitė	Lithuania	44.314	Q
3	3	20	Lee Eunbyul	South Korea	44.662	
4	3	30	Natalia Plugina	Russia	45.574	
1	4	22	Son Hakyung	South Korea	44.88	Q
2	4	32	Anastasia Surkova	Russia	45.694	Q
3	4	27	Agnieszka Tawrel	Poland	46.511	
	4	10	Wang Xue	China		PEN

=== Semifinals ===
QA — qualified for Final A
QB- qualified for Final B
ADV — advanced
PEN — penalty

Rank	Heat	Bib	Name	Country	Time	Notes
1	1	22	Son Hakyung	South Korea	44.559	QA
2	1	1	Joanie Gervais	Canada	44.661	QA
3	1	5	Caroline Truchon	Canada	44.785	QB
4	1	38	Katherine Ralston	United States	No Time	QB
1	2	6	Han Yutong	China	44.357	QA
2	2	24	Agnė Sereikaitė	Lithuania	44.463	QA
	2	8	Li Hongshuang	China		PEN
	2	32	Anastasia Surkova	Russia		PEN

=== Final A (medal round) ===
Final B cancelled due to lack of athletes

Rank	Bib	Name	Country	Time	Notes
1st place, gold medalist(s)	6	Han Yutong	China	43.573	UR
2nd place, silver medalist(s)	22	Son Hakyung	South Korea	43.655	
3rd place, bronze medalist(s)	24	Agnė Sereikaitė	Lithuania	43.817	
4	1	Joanie Gervais	Canada	43.963	
