= Biathlon at the 2015 Winter Universiade – Men's 15 km mass start =

The men's 15 km mass start competition of the 2015 Winter Universiade was held at the Sporting Centre FIS Štrbské Pleso on January 31.

== Results ==
Rank	Bib	Name	Country	Time	Penalties (P+P+S+S)	Deficit
1st place, gold medalist(s)	16	Vitaliy Kilchytskyy	Ukraine	43:17.1	4 (0+1+3+0)	
2nd place, silver medalist(s)	2	Dmytro Rusinov	Ukraine	43:28.1	3 (1+1+1+0)	+11.0
3rd place, bronze medalist(s)	1	Yuri Shopin	Russia	43:46.6	5 (0+3+1+1)	+29.5
4	17	Yohan Huillier	France	44:05.3	4 (0+1+2+1)	+48.2
5	5	Vincent Mathieu	France	44:10.4	3 (1+0+1+1)	+53.3
6	13	Håkon Svaland	Norway	44:21.9	7 (0+0+3+4)	+1:04.8
7	11	Ole Martin Erdal	Norway	44:30.7	5 (0+0+1+4)	+1:13.6
8	4	Vadim Filimonov	Russia	44:32.9	4 (0+1+1+2)	+1:15.8
9	19	Sami Orpana	Finland	44:33.4	2 (0+1+1+0)	+1:16.3
10	8	Ruslan Tkalenko	Ukraine	45:09.7	8 (0+2+3+3)	+1:52.6
11	15	Chris Endre Haugen	Norway	45:46	5 (0+1+1+3)	+2:28.9
12	6	Oleg Kolodiichuk	Russia	45:53	5 (1+2+1+1)	+2:35.9
13	20	Timur Khamitgatin	Kazakhstan	46:03.9	6 (2+2+0+2)	+2:46.8
14	12	Maksim Ramanouski	Belarus	46:19.8	1 (0+0+1+0)	+3:02.7
15	23	Dany Chavoutier	France	46:23.5	4 (2+0+1+1)	+3:06.4
16	14	Michal Kubaliak	Slovakia	46:34.5	6 (2+2+2+0)	+3:17.4
17	21	Oleksii Kravchenko	Ukraine	46:39.5	1 (1+0+0+0)	+3:22.4
18	25	Thibaut Ogier	France	47:10	3 (1+0+0+2)	+3:52.9
19	26	Sergey Neverov	Russia	47:25	8 (0+3+3+2)	+4:07.9
20	24	Michal Krčmař	Czech Republic	47:45.7	11 (3+1+4+3)	+4:28.6
21	10	Michal Šima	Slovakia	48:18.5	7 (0+2+3+2)	+5:01.4
22	30	Henri Lehtomaa	Finland	48:33.5	8 (0+1+4+3)	+5:16.4
23	28	Michal Žák	Czech Republic	48;34.6	4 (0+1+2+1)	+5:17.5
24	9	Stanislav Pershikov	Russia	49:14	8 (3+1+3+1)	+5:56.9
25	22	Aliaksei Abromchyk	Belarus	49:42.5	7 (0+0+4+3)	+6:25.4
26	29	Kamil Cymerman	Poland	50:44	6 (1+0+2+3)	+7:26.9
27	7	Vasyl Potapenko	Ukraine	51:41.8	12 (4+4+2+2)	+8:24.7
28	27	Henrich Lonsky	Slovakia	51:53.5	5 (0+1+2+2)	+8:36.4
	3	Maksim Burtasov	Russia	DNF	(3)	
	18	Tommy Grøtte	Norway	DNF	(0+3+3)	
