= Biathlon at the 2015 Winter Universiade – Women's 7.5 km sprint =

The women's 7.5 km sprint competition of the 2015 Winter Universiade was held at the National Biathlon Centre in Osrblie on January 27.

== Results ==
Rank	Bib	Name	Country	Time	Penalties (P+S)	Deficit
1st place, gold medalist(s)	6	Paulína Fialková	Slovakia	20:20.8	0 (0+0)	
2nd place, silver medalist(s)	27	Evgenia Pavlova	Russia	20:50.3	0 (0+0)	+29.5
3rd place, bronze medalist(s)	4	Jitka Landová	Czech Republic	20:55.7	1 (0+1)	+34.9
4	29	Eva Puskarčíková	Czech Republic	21:12.2	2 (0+2)	+51.4
5	49	Galina Vishnevskaya	Kazakhstan	21:18.3	0 (0+0)	+57.5
6	25	Anna Kristanova	Kazakhstan	21:34.4	0 (0+0)	+1:13.6
7	32	Yuliya Brygynets	Ukraine	21:38.9	0 (0+0)	+1;18.1
8	2	Iana Bondar	Ukraine	21:44.5	3 (1+2)	+1:23.7
9	21	Kristina Smirnova	Russia	22:04.4	2 (0+2)	+1:43.6
10	38	Alla Gylenko	Ukraine	22:08.6	1 (0+1)	+1:47.8
11	42	Kristina Lytvynenko	Ukraine	22:10.5	1 (0+1)	+1:49.7
12	14	Darya Ussanova	Kazakhstan	22:17.2	1 (0+1)	+1:56.4
13	46	Nadezhda Efremova	Russia	22:19.3	2 (0+2)	+1:58.15
14	47	Ludmila Horká	Czech Republic	22:22.1	2 (0+2)	+2:01.3
15	10	Ekaterina Avvakumova	Russia	22:29.2	1 (0+1)	+2:08.4
16	9	Patrycja Hojnisz	Poland	22:31.1	3 (1+2)	+2;10.3
17	17	Julie Cardon	France	22:43.7	1 (0+1)	+2:22.9
18	1	Nadiia Bielkina	Ukraine	22:51.6	4 (2+2)	+2:30.8
19	20	Anna Mąka	Poland	22:59.9	2 (0+2)	+2:39.1
20	11	Suvi Minkkinen	Finland	23:07.1	0 (0+0)	+2:46.3
21	30	Alina Lutsykovich	Belarus	23:09.8	2 (0+2)	+2:49
22	34	Alina Raikova	Kazakhstan	23:14.5	2 (1+1)	+2:53.7
23	33	Juliette Lazzarotto	France	23:19.9	2 (1+1)	+2:59.1
24	3	Lene Berg Ådlandsvik	Norway	23;22.5	3 (1+2)	+3:01.7
25	26	Lucia Simová	Slovakia	23:24.9	2 (1+1)	+3:04.1
26	28	Kristina Ilchenko	Russia	23:26.8	6 (1+5)	+3:06
27	7	Alžbeta Majdišová	Slovakia	23:30.9	2 (0+2)	+3:10.1
28	48	Rikke Hald Andersen	Norway	23:31.4	4 (1+3)	+3:10.6
29	37	Tonje Marie Skjeldstadås	Norway	23:35.6	2 (0+2)	+3:14.8
30	45	Janka Maráková	Slovakia	23:36.9	2 (1+1)	+3:16.1
31	23	Andrea Horčiková	Slovakia	23:45	3 (1+2)	+3:24.2
32	19	Anastassiya Kondratyeva	Kazakhstan	23:45.3	1 (0+1)	+3;24.5
33	40	Ekaterina Muraleeva	Russia	23:47.8	4 (3+1)	+3:27
34	50	Iryna Behan	Ukraine	23:48.5	3 (2+1)	+3:27.7
35	16	Victoria Padial	Spain	23:55.7	5 (2+3)	+3:34.9
36	31	Meri Maijala	Finland	24:16.8	1 (0+1)	+3:56
37	48	Galina Mikryukova	Kazakhstan	24:19.4	4 (2+2)	+3:58.6
38	44	Karolina Batożyńska	Poland	24:25.1	2 (0+2)	+4:04.3
39	35	Katarzyna Wołoszyn	Poland	24:36.8	2 (1+1)	+4:16
40	36	Keely Macculloch	Canada	25:04.7	2 (1+1)	+4:43.9
41	39	Laurie-Anne Serrette	France	25:17.8	5 (3+2)	+4:57
42	43	Mira Holopainen	Finland	25:27.3	6 (2+4)	+5:06.5
43	15	Jessica Paterson	Canada	26:04	3 (3+0)	+5:43.2
44	13	Ham Hae-young	South Korea	26:33.5	1 (0+1)	+6:12.7
45	22	Takeda Chinatsu	Japan	26:37.4	7 (2+5)	+6:16.6
46	24	Busra Güneş	Turkey	27:17.9	4 (0+4)	+6:57.1
47	18	Veronica Bessone	Italy	28:03.4	1 (0+1)	+7:42.6
48	5	Jillian Colebourn	Australia	28:11.5	3 (3+0)	+7:50.7
49	8	Jo Kyung-ran	South Korea	28:58.1	3 (2+1)	+8:37.3
50	12	Nihan Erdiler	Turkey	30:33.2	5 (3+2)	+10:12.4
