= Biathlon at the 2015 Winter Universiade – Women's 15 km individual =

The women's 15 km individual competition of the 2015 Winter Universiade was held at the National Biathlon Centre in Osrblie on January 25.

== Results ==
Rank	Bib	Name	Country	Time	Penalties (P+S+P+S)	Deficit
1st place, gold medalist(s)	37	Alina Raikova	Kazakhstan	47:29.4	1 (0+1+0+0)	0.0
2nd place, silver medalist(s)	3	Ekaterina Avvakumova	Russia	47:38.4	0 (0+0+0+0)	+9.0
3rd place, bronze medalist(s)	12	Paulína Fialková	Slovakia	48:11.1	4 (1+0+1+2)	+41.7
4	20	Galina Vishnevskaya	Kazakhstan	48:26.3	2 (1+1+0+0)	+56.9
5	27	Evgeniia Pavlova	Russia	48:59.9	2 (0+1+0+1)	+1:30.5
6	22	Kristina Smirnova	Russia	50:17.2	4 (0+1+1+2)	+2:47.8
7	10	Ludmila Horká	Czech Republic	50:49.7	4 (0+0+1+3)	+3:20.3
8	16	Ekaterina Muraleeva	Russia	51:03.3	3 (1+0+2+0)	+3:33.9
9	13	Darya Usanova	Kazakhstan	51:08.1	5 (0+1+1+3)	+3:38.7
10	6	Juliette Lazzarotto	France	51:16.2	3 (1+1+0+1)	+3:46.8
11	39	Nadezda Morozova	Russia	51:39.3	4 (1+1+1+1)	+4:09.9
12	33	Alla Gylenko	Ukraine	52:02.2	3 (2+1+0+0)	+4:32.8
13	34	Lene Berg Ådlandsvik	Norway	52:21.1	3 (0+2+0+1)	+4:51.7
14	44	Elena Ankudinova	Russia	52:34.3	3 (0+3+0+0)	+5:04.9
15	23	Iana Bondar	Ukraine	52:44.0	7 (2+2+2+1)	+5:14.6
16	4	Anna Mąka	Poland	52:45.1	2 (1+0+0+1)	+5:15.7
17	36	Victoria Padial	Spain	53:01.5	6 (1+2+1+2)	+5:32.1
18	5	Nadiia Bielkina	Ukraine	53:20.8	6 (1+2+2+1)	+5:51.4
19	38	Tonje Marie Skjeldstadås	Norway	53:21.7	3 (1+1+1+0)	+5:52.3
20	9	Patrycja Hojnisz	Poland	53:25.8	6 (0+2+1+3)	+5:56.4
21	15	Rikke Hald Andersen	Norway	53:32.8	5 (0+4+0+1)	+6:03.4
22	46	Katarzyna Wołoszyn	Poland	53:33.2	1 (0+0+0+1)	+6:03.8
23	7	Alžbeta Majdišová	Slovakia	53:34.8	4 (1+0+1+2)	+6:05.4
24	26	Aliona Lutsykovich	Belarus	53:55.6	5 (0+2+1+2)	+6:26.2
25	19	Yuliya Brygynets	Ukraine	54:26.8	6 (0+2+4+0)	+6:57.4
26	41	Iryna Behan	Ukraine	54:35.0	6 (1+2+1+2)	+7:05.6
27	40	Kristina Lytvynenko	Ukraine	55:04.9	6 (0+1+2+3)	+7:35.5
28	25	Lucia Simová	Slovakia	55:19.8	6 (1+1+0+4)	+7:50.4
29	35	Anastassiya Kondratyeva	Kazakhstan	55:32.0	4 (2+0+1+1)	+8:02.6
30	32	Andrea Horčiková	Slovakia	56:30.2	7 (0+2+2+3)	+9:00.8
31	45	Laurie-Anne Serrette	France	56:49.4	7 (2+2+1+2)	+9:20.0
32	42	Janka Maráková	Slovakia	56:52.5	7 (1+3+1+2)	+9:23.1
33	24	Julie Cardon	France	56:57.6	8 (2+3+0+3)	+9:28.2
34	17	Suvi Minkkinen	Finland	57:06.6	5 (1+2+0+2)	+9:37.2
35	28	Meri Maijala	Finland	57:06.9	4 (1+2+1+0)	+9:37.5
36	47	Galina Mikryukova	Kazakhstan	57:21.3	8 (3+1+3+1)	+9:51.9
37	14	Keely MacCulloch	Canada	58:26.2	4 (0+2+1+1)	+10:56.8
38	31	Karolina Batożyńska	Poland	58:56.1	6 (0+0+3+3)	+11:26.7
39	29	Jessica Paterson	Canada	59:54.5	5 (0+1+3+1)	+12:25.1
40	11	Busra Güneş	Turkey	1:01:56.3	6 (2+3+0+1)	+14:26.9
41	43	Mira Holopainen	Finland	1:02:02.8	11 (3+2+3+3)	+14:33.4
42	21	Ham Hae-yeong	South Korea	1:02:24.5	5 (0+2+1+2)	+14:55.1
43	2	Chinatsu Takeda	Japan	1:05:11.0	14 (2+4+4+4)	+17:41.6
44	1	Jillian Colebourn	Australia	1:08:05.5	6 (1+2+0+3)	+20:36.1
45	8	Veronica Bessone	Italy	1:10:23.8	5 (2+0+2+1)	+22:54.4
46	18	Jo Kyung-ran	South Korea	1:10:35.3	8 (2+1+2+3)	+23:05.9
47	30	Nihan Erdiler	Turkey	1:15:40.1	12 (3+3+5+1)	+28:10.7
