= Biathlon at the 2015 Winter Universiade – Women's 12.5 km mass start =

The women's 12.5 km mass start competition of the 2015 Winter Universiade was held at the Sporting Centre FIS Štrbské Pleso on January 31, 2015.

== Results ==
Rank	Bib	Name	Country	Time	Penalties (P+P+S+S)	Deficit
1st place, gold medalist(s)	3	Jitka Landová	Czech Republic	40;00.5	2 (0+0+1+1)	
2nd place, silver medalist(s)	28	Eva Puskarčíková	Czech Republic	40:55.7	2 (0+0+0+2)	+55.2
3rd place, bronze medalist(s)	5	Iana Bondar	Ukraine	41:06	6 (1+0+1+4)	+1:05.5
4	8	Yuliya Brygynets	Ukraine	41:25.6	2 (1+0+1+0)	+1;25.1
5	30	Elena Ankudinova	Russia	41:38.9	1 (0+0+1+0)	+1:38.4
6	4	Galina Vishnevskaya	Kazakhstan	41:48.8	5 (0+1+1+3)	+1:48.3
7	2	Ekaterina Avvakumova	Russia	42:13.3	2 (1+0+1+0)	+2:12.8
8	11	Nadiia Bielkina	Ukraine	42:18.3	3 (0+1+2+0)	+2:17.8
9	1	Paulína Fialková	Slovakia	42:37.3	4 (1+0+0+3)	+2:36.8
10	24	Rikke Hald Andersen	Norway	42:51.8	3 (0+0+2+1)	+2:51.3
11	10	Ekaterina Muraleeva	Russia	43;24.1	3 (0+2+1+0)	+3:23.6
12	9	Anna Kistanova	Kazakhstan	43:44	6 (2+1+1+2)	+3:43.5
13	26	Lene Berg Ålandsvik	Norway	43:49.9	5 (2+2+1+0)	+3:49.4
14	19	Victoria Padial	Spain	44:00.6	5 (0+1+2+2)	+4:00.1
15	21	Kristina Ilchenko	Russia	44:17.4	8 (3+1+2+2)	+4;16.9
16	17	Nadezhda Efremova	Russia	44:20.5	4 (1+2+1+0)	+4:20
17	12	Kristina Lytvynenko	Ukraine	44:41.5	3 (1+1+0+1)	+4:41
18	13	Juliette Lazzarotto	France	44:53.3	1 (0+1+0+0)	+4:52.8
19	25	Lucia Simová	Slovakia	44:58.9	4 (0+3+0+1)	+4;58.4
20	29	Nadezda Morozova	Russia	45:01.4	3 (0+1+1+1)	+5:00.9
21	23	Aliona Lutsykovich	Belarus	45:15.7	4 (2+1+1+0)	+5:15.2
22	16	Julie Cardon	France	45:27.2	3 (1+0+1+1)	+5:26.7
23	6	Ludmila Horká	Czech Republic	45:43.5	8 (0+3+2+3)	+5:43
24	14	Patrycja Hojnisz	Poland	45:45.2	8 (3+2+2+1)	+5:44.7
25	15	Anna Mąka	Poland	45:45.3	4 (1+2+0+1)	+5:44.8
26	22	Tonje Marie Skjeldstadås	Norway	46:14.2	5 (2+1+1+1)	+6:13.7
27	7	Alla Gylenko	Ukraine	47:15.4	8 (2+2+2+2)	+7:14.9
28	20	Alžbeta Majdišová	Slovakia	47:23.5	4 (1+0+2+1)	+7:23
29	27	Suvi Minkkinen	Finland	48;11.5	5 (1+0+2+2)	+8:11
	18	Darya Ussanova	Kazakhstan	DNF	(3)	
