= Özlem Çarıkçıoğlu =

Turkish alpine skier (born 1994)

Personal information
- Nationality: Turkey
- Born: 11 January 1994 (age 32) Sakarya, Turkey

Sport
- Sport: Skiing
- Club: AKUT Sports Club

Özlem Çarıkçıoğlu (born 11 January 1994) is a Turkish alpine skier, who competed at the 2018 and 2022 Winter Olympics.

== Personal life ==
Özlem Çarıkçıoğlu was born in Sakarya, Turkey on 11 January 1994. After completing her high school education at Robert College, she studied Industrial Engineering at Koç University in Istanbul. Aside from skiing, Çarıkçıoğlu practices ballet.

== Sports career ==
At the age of eight, Çarıkçıoğlu made acquaintance with skiing during a winter camp at Uludağ in Bursa held by her primary school. She is a member of the AKUT Search and Rescue Association, and competed for the AKUT sports Club's Snow Sports Branch.

She competed at the 2011 European Youth Olympic Winter Festival. She took part in the alpine skiing women's giant slalom and women's slalom events at the 2015 Winter Universiade held in the Sierra Nevada Ski Station, Canada. She competed in the alpine skiing women's giant slalom (37th place) and women's slalom (did not finish) events at the 2017 Winter Universiade in Almaty, Kazakhstan.

Çarıkçıoğlu competed at the 2018 Winter Olympics, where she was the only Turkish female alpine skier. She missed one event at the games due to a fever. She was one of seven Turkish athletes at the 2022 Winter Olympics, and was the oldest Turkish competitor at the games. She placed 49th in the slalom discipline.

== See also ==
- Turkey at the 2018 Winter Olympics
- Turkey at the 2022 Winter Olympics
