= Biathlon at the 2015 Winter Universiade – Women's 10 km pursuit =

The women's 10 km pursuit competition of the 2015 Winter Universiade was held at the National Biathlon Centre in Osrblie on January 28.

== Results ==
Rank	Bib	Name	Country	Time	Penalties (P+P+S+S)	Deficit
1st place, gold medalist(s)	2	Evgenia Pavlova	Russia	30;45.1	2 (0+0+1+1)	
2nd place, silver medalist(s)	1	Paulína Fialková	Slovakia	31:23.3	3 (2+0+1+0)	+38.2
3rd place, bronze medalist(s)	9	Kristina Smirnova	Russia	32:30.9	2 (0+2+0+0)	+1:45.8
4	6	Anna Kistanova	Kazakhstan	33:34.1	3 (0+1+0+2)	+2:49
5	8	Iana Bondar	Ukraine	33;46.9	7 (1+1+3+2)	+3:01.8
6	26	Kristina Ilchenko	Russia	34:01.8	5 (3+0+0+2)	+3:16.7
7	7	Yuliya Brygynets	Ukraine	34:02.3	4 (0+2+1+1)	+3:17.2
8	13	Nadezhda Efremova	Russia	34:04.5	4 (1+1+1+1)	+3:19.4
9	17	Julie Cardon	France	34:12.8	1 (1+0+0+0)	+3:27.7
10	15	Ekaterina Avvakumova	Russia	34:13	2 (1+0+1+0)	+3:27.9
11	33	Ekaterina Muraleeva	Russia	34:24.3	1 (0+0+0+1)	+3:39.2
12	10	Alla Gylenko	Ukraine	34:24.7	4 (0+1+1+2)	+3:39.6
13	14	Ludmila Horká	Czech Republic	34:35.4	5 (0+1+2+2)	+3;50.3
14	11	Kristina Lytvynenko	Ukraine	35:14.8	5 (0+1+3+1)	+4:27
15	18	Nadiia Bielkina	Ukraine	35:15.1	4 (1+1+0+2)	+4:30
16	5	Galina Vishnevskaya	Kazakhstan	35:40.9	10 (3+5+1+1)	+4:55.8
17	35	Victoria Padial	Spain	35:44.1	3 (1+2+0+0)	+4:59
18	16	Patrycja Hojnisz	Poland	35:50.5	7 (1+3+1+2)	+5:05.4
19	27	Alžbeta Majdišová	Slovakia	36:01.5	3 (0+0+2+1)	+5:16.4
20	23	Juliette Lazzarotto	France	36:36.3	3 (0+1+1+1)	+5:51.2
21	19	Anna Mąka	Poland	36:38.6	4 (2+1+0+1)	+5:53.5
22	25	Lucia Simová	Slovakia	36:45.3	4 (1+2+1+0)	+6:00.2
23	29	Tonje Marie Skjeldstadås	Norway	36:46.6	4 (0+1+2+1)	+6:01.5
24	28	Rikke Hald Andersen	Norway	37:01.3	4 (0+1+2+1)	+6;16.2
25	20	Suvi Minkkinen	Finland	37:37.6	5 (2+1+1+1)	+6;52.5
26	21	Aliona Lutsykovich	Belarus	38:31.5	6 (0+2+2+2)	+7:46.4
	24	Lene Berg Ålandsvik	Norway	LAP	7 (3+1+3)	
	30	Janka Maráková	Slovakia	LAP	6 (2+1+3)	
	31	Andrea Horčiková	Slovakia	LAP	7 (1+2+4)	
	32	Anastassiya Kondratyeva	Kazakhstan	LAP	2 (0+2+0)	
	34	Iryna Behan	Ukraine	LAP	5 (2+3)	
	36	Meri Maijala	Finland	LAP	2 (2+0)	
	37	Galina Mikryukova	Kazakhstan	LAP	5 (1+4)	
	39	Katarzyna Wołoszyn	Poland	LAP	1 (0+1)	
	40	Keely Macculloch	Canada	LAP	2 (2+0)	
	41	Laurie-Anne Serrette	France	LAP	3 (1+0+2)	
	42	Mira Holopainen	Finland	LAP	4 (3+1)	
	43	Jessica Paterson	Canada	LAP	0 (0+0)	
	44	Ham Hae-young	South Korea	LAP	2 (2)	
	45	Takeda Chinatsu	Japan	LAP	7 (2+5)	
	47	Veronica Bessone	Italy	LAP	2 (2)	
	48	Jillian Colebourn	Australia	LAP	4 (1+3)	
	49	Jo Kyung-ran	South Korea	LAP	2 (2)	
	3	Jitka Landová	Czech Republic	DNS		
	4	Eva Puskarčíková	Czech Republic	DNS		
	12	Darya Ussanova	Kazakhstan	DNS		
	22	Alina Raikova	Kazakhstan	DNS		
	38	Karolina Batożyńska	Poland	DNS		
	46	Busra Güneş	Turkey	DNS		
	50	Nihan Erdiler	Turkey	DNS		
