= Ken Vuagnoux =

French snowboarder (born 1995)

Personal information
- Nationality: French
- Born: 25 July 1995 (age 30) Nice, France
- Height: 1.72 m (5 ft 8 in)

Sport
- Sport: Snowboarding

Ken Vuagnoux (born 25 July 1995) is a French snowboarder athlete. He competed in the 2018 Winter Olympics.
