= Biathlon at the 2015 Winter Universiade – Mixed 2 x 6 km + 2 x 7.5 km relay =

The Mixed 2×6 km + 2×7.5 km relay competition of the 2015 Winter Universiade was held at the Sporting Centre FIS Štrbské Pleso on January 30.

== Results ==
Rank	Bib	Country	Time	Penalties (P+S)	Deficit
1st place, gold medalist(s)	1	Russia; Kristina Smirnova; Evgenia Pavlova; Vadim Filimonov; Yuri Shopin	1:36:38.4; 22:50.7; 24:08.2; 24:50.5; 24:49	0+2 0+4; 0+1 0+1; 0+0 0+0; 0+1 0+2; 0+0 0+1	
2nd place, silver medalist(s)	9	Kazakhstan; Galina Vishnevskaya; Anna Kistanova; Maxim Braun; Vassiliy Podkorytov	1:37:11.6; 22:24.4; 23:54.8; 25:30.5; 25:21.9	0+4 0+3; 0+0 0+0; 0+1 0+1; 0+3 0+2; 0+0 0+0	+33.2
3rd place, bronze medalist(s)	2	Ukraine; Yuliya Brygynets; Iana Bondar; Ruslan Tkalenko; Dmytro Rusinov	1:37:27.6; 22:51.4; 25:10.3; 24:47.3; 24:38.6	0+2 4+6; 0+1 0+0; 0+0 4+3; 0+0 0+2; 0+1 0+1	+49.2
4	3	France; Juliette Lazzarotto; Julie Cardon; Yohan Huillier; Vincent Mathieu	1:40:23.8; 24:58.7; 24:35.9; 25:04.3; 25:44.9	0+3 0+4; 0+2 0+2; 0+1 0+1; 0+0 0+1; 0+0 0+0	+3:45.4
5	4	Slovakia; Alžbeta Majdišová; Lucia Šimová; Michal Kubaliak; Michal Šíma	1:41:01.4; 24:31.3; 25:39.6; 25:13.8; 25:36.7	0+2 0+2; 0+1 0+0; 0+0 0+0; 0+0 0+1; 0+1 0+1	+4:23.0
6	11	Norway; Tonje Marie Skjeldstadås; Lene Berg Ålandsvik; Ole Martin Erdal; Håkon Svaland	1:41:15.7; 25:48.1; 25:41; 24:56.8; 24:49.8	0+5 1+8; 0+2 1+3; 0+1 0+2; 0+2 0+0; 0+0 0+3	+4:37.3
7	5	Poland; Anna Maka; Patrycja Hojnisz; Kamil Cymerman; Aleksander Piech	1;44:34.2; 24:25.3; 24:48.9; 27:20.6; 28:19.4	0+4 0+7; 0+0 0+2; 0+1 0+1; 0+0 0+2; 0+3 0+2	+7:55.8
8	6	Finland; Suvi Minkkinen; Meri Maijala; Sami Orpana; Henri Lehtomaa	LAP; 26:10; 27:29.6; 25:53.4	0+2 0+2; 0+0 0+0; 0+2 0+0; 0+0 0+0; 0+0 0+2	
9	10	Turkey; Nihan Erdiler; Büșra Güneş; Ahmet Üştüntaş; Organhazi Civil	LAP; 31:15.7; 27:29.7; 28:36.3	1+5 0+4; 1+3 0+3; 0+0 0+1; 0+0 0+0; 0+2	
10	7	Canada; Keely MacCulloch; Jessica Paterson; Evan Girard; Reagan Mills	LAP; 28:03.3; 29:35.6; 32:51.1	2+6 1+6; 0+1 1+3; 2+3 0+0; 0+0 0+3; 0+2	
	8	South Korea; Ham Hae-young; Jo Kyung-ran; Kim Chang-huyn; Son Sung-rack	DNF; 29:50.9; 34:23.8; 32:32.9	0+2 1+9; 0+1 0+3; 0+1 1+3; 0+0 0+3	
