= Vladislav Novikov =

Russian alpine skier (born 1993)

Personal information
- Born: 10 November 1993 (age 32) Toksovo, Russia
- Height: 1.70 m (5 ft 7 in) (5' 7″)
- Weight: 78 kg / 172 lb
Medal record
Alpine skiing
Representing Russia

Vladislav Novikov (born 10 November 1993 in Toksovo, Russia) is an alpine skier from Russia. He competed for Russia at the 2014 Winter Olympics in the alpine skiing events.
