= Jérémy Masson =

French speed skater (born 1987)

Personal information
- Nationality: French
- Born: 6 October 1987 (age 37); Moûtiers, France

Sport
- Sport: Short track speed skating

Jérémy Masson (born 6 October 1987) is a French short track speed skater. He competed in the men's 5000 metre relay event at the 2010 Winter Olympics.
