= Xu Fu (speed skater) =

Chinese speed skater

Personal information
- Born: 2 November 1995 (age 30) Heihe, Heilongjiang, China

Sport
- Country: China
- Sport: Short track speed skating

Achievements and titles
- Personal best(s): 500m: 42.497 (2014); 1000m: 1:25.443 (2013); 1500m: 2:26.110 (2014)
Medal record
Men's short track speed skating
Representing China
Four Continents Championships
Silver medal – second place	2020 Milwaukee	Team sprint
World Junior Championships
Gold medal – first place	2014 Erzurum	3000 m relay
Silver medal – second place	2012 Melbourne	3000 m relay
Winter Universiade
Gold medal – first place	2015 Granada	5000 m relay
Gold medal – first place	2017 Almaty	5000 m relay

Xu Fu (Chinese: 徐富; born 2 November 1995 in Heilongjiang) is a Chinese male short track speed skater. He ranked 4th for men's 1000 meters in 2013 Winter Universiade in Trento, Italy.

== Career ==
Fu was part of Team China for the 2022 Winter Olympic Games.
