= Stian Saugestad =

Norwegian alpine skier (born 1992)

Stian Saugestad (born 12 October 1992) is a Norwegian former alpine skier.

He competed at the 2015 Winter Universiade, albeit without finishing any race. He made his FIS Alpine Ski World Cup debut in February 2016 in Hinterstoder, not managing to finish. He collected his first World Cup points with a 21st place finish in February 2017 in Kvitfjell. He broke the top 20 for the first time in November 2017 in Lake Louise with an 18th place, and then managed an 11th place in March 2018 in Kvitfjell.

He represented the sports club Grong IL.
