= Dmytro Rusinov =

Ukrainian biathlete (born 1990)

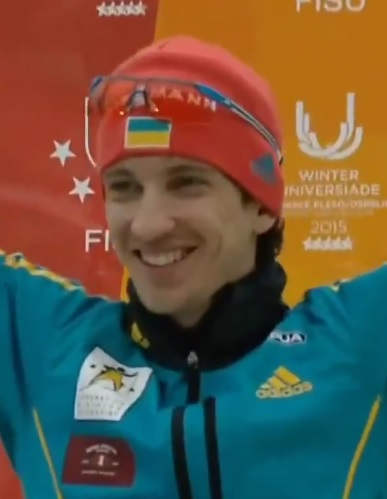
- Dmytro Rusinov at the 2015 Winter Universiade

Personal information
- Born: 26 February 1990 (age 36) Dedovsk, Russian SFSR

Sport
- Sport: Skiing
Medal record
Men's biathlon
Representing Ukraine
Winter Universiade
Gold medal – first place	2015 Osrblie	Individual
Silver medal – second place	2015 Osrblie	Mass start
Bronze medal – third place	2015 Osrblie	Mixed relay

Dmytro Rusinov (born 26 February 1990) is a Ukrainian biathlete.
