= Dennis Visser (speed skater) =

Dutch speed skater

Personal information
- Nationality: Dutch
- Born: 3 April 1995 (age 30) Sneek, Netherlands
- Height: 1.88 m (6 ft 2 in)
- Weight: 76 kg (168 lb)

Sport
- Country: Netherlands
- Sport: Short track speed skating

Dennis Visser (born 3 April 1995 in Sneek) is a Dutch short track speed skater.

He won the gold medal in the 5000 metre relay event at the 2017 World Short Track Speed Skating Championships and also at the 2018 European Short Track Speed Skating Championships. He is selected for the 5000 m relay team at the 2018 Winter Olympics.

== Biography ==
Visser started with short track speed skating when he was 8 years old, in Thialf, Heerenveen. In February 2017 Visser torn his ankle ligament.

He studies management at the Friesland College in Heerenveen.
