= Ahmet Üstüntaş =

Turkish biathlete

Personal information
- Nationality: Turkish
- Born: 27 January 1990 (age 35)

Sport
- Country: Turkey
- Sport: Biathlon

Ahmet Üstüntaş (born 27 January 1990) is a Turkish biathlete. He represented Turkey at the 2011, 2012, 2013, 2015 and 2016 Biathlon World Championships.
