= Christian Lorenzi =

French academic

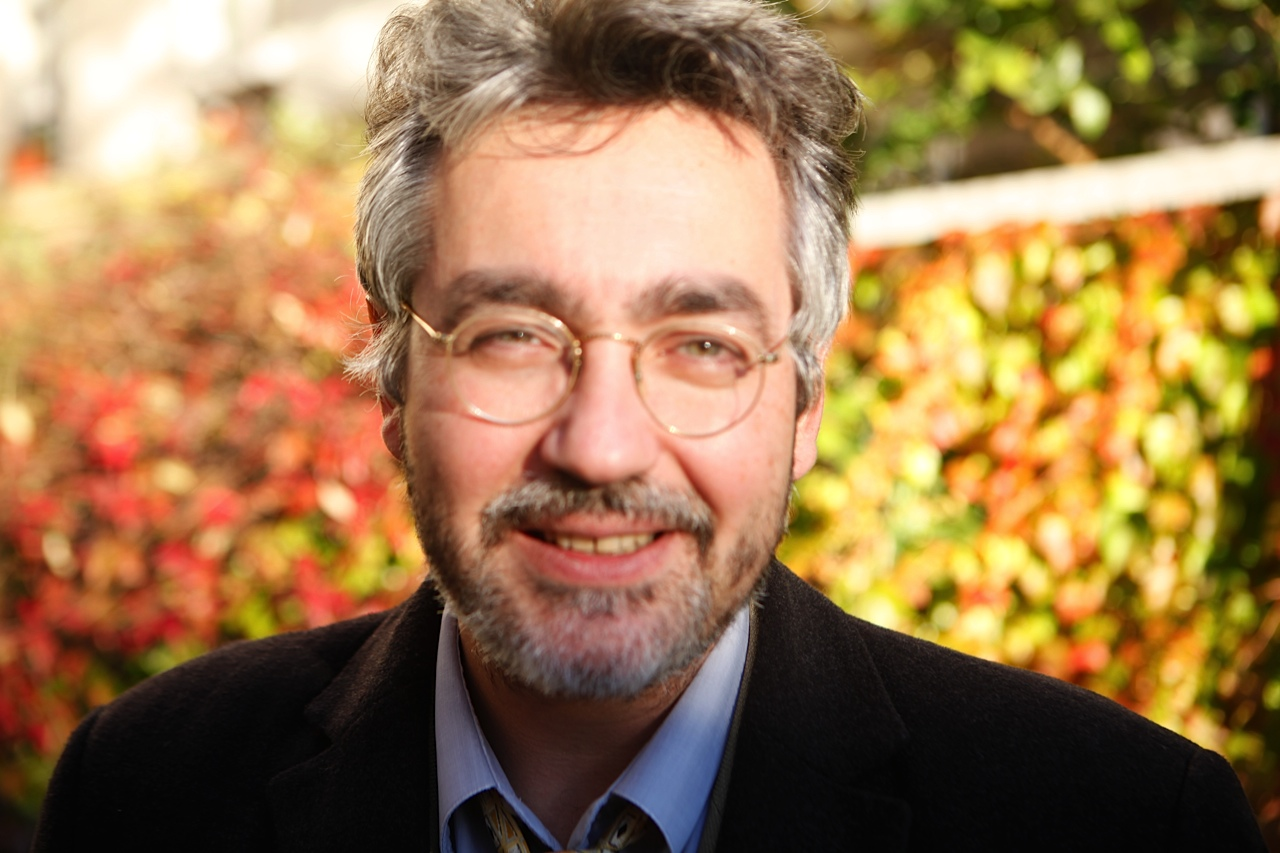
- Christian Lorenzi in 2012
- Born: April 15, 1968 (age 57)
- Education: PhD, Université Lyon 2, France, 1995
- Scientific career
- Fields: Auditory sciences
- Institutions: École Normale Supérieure, Paris, France
- Thesis: "Codage de la modulation d'amplitude dans le système auditif: expériences psychoacoustiques et modélisation physiologique" (1995)
- Website: lsp.dec.ens.fr/en/member/646/christian-lorenzi

Christian Lorenzi (born April 15, 1968) is Professor of Experimental Psychology at École Normale Supérieure in Paris, France, where he has been Director of the Department of Cognitive Studies and Director of Scientific Studies until. Lorenzi works on auditory perception.

== Biography ==
Lorenzi obtained a PhD in experimental psychology from Université Lyon 2 in 1995 for his work on "Codage de la modulation d'amplitude dans le système auditif: expériences psychoacoustiques et modélisation physiologique" (coding of amplitude modulation in the auditory system: psychoacoustical experiments and physiological modelling). He then spent a year as a postdoc at the Applied Psychology Unit in Cambridge, UK, where he worked with Roy D. Patterson on the perception of temporally asymmetric envelopes and click trains. The following year, he moved to the Glasgow branch of the MRC Institute of Hearing Research where he worked with Stuart Gatehouse.

Back in France, he became Lecturer (Maître de Conférences) at the Université Paris Descartes. He obtained his Habilitation à Diriger les Recherches in 2000 and became Professor in 2001. During this period, he is a member of the Laboratoire de Psychologie de la Perception where he worked on the creation of the Équipe Audition which becomes physically located at the ENS. In 2011, his affiliation officially changed to the École Normale Supérieure, where he was Director of Scientific Studies until 2020.

Lorenzi became a fellow of the Acoustical Society of America in 2008.

== Research ==
Sounds such as speech, music and natural soundscapes are decomposed by the peripheral auditory system of humans (the cochlea) into narrow frequency bands. The resulting signals convey information at different time scales to more central auditory structures. A dichotomy between slow "temporal envelope" cues and faster "temporal fine structure" (TFS) cues has been proposed to explore several aspects of auditory perception including speech intelligibility in quiet or against competing sound sources.

Starting from the late nineties, Lorenzi conducted a research program on auditory perception combining signal processing, psychophysical, electrophysiological and computational methods based on this envelope/TFS dichotomy. He examined the role of these two cues in sound discrimination and auditory scene analysis, how these cues are processed at each stage of the auditory system, and the effects of peripheral (cochlear) or central damage, development, ageing and rehabilitation systems (e.g., hearing aids or cochlear implants) on the perception of these temporal envelope and TFS cues.

His early work on the perception of temporal-envelope information corroborated the existence of tuned (selective) modulation filters at central stages of the human auditory system, consistent with the notion that the auditory system computes some form of modulation spectrum of incoming sounds. He then showed that dynamic information in sounds not only is carried by so-called first-order characteristic of sounds (e.g., onset and offset cues, slow amplitude modulations composing the envelope of sounds), but also can be carried by “second-order” characteristics such as variations in the temporal-envelope contrast (modulation depth). His psychophysical conducted on normal-hearing people and patients with cochlear or brain lesions is consistent with the idea that, as in vision, nonlinear mechanisms along the auditory pathway generate an audible distortion component at the 2nd-order AM frequency in the internal modulation spectrum of sounds.

His more recent work on the perception of TFS information suggested that TFS cues convey as much spectro-temporal information as temporal-envelope cues do for complex sounds such as speech. He also showed that TFS cues are less vulnerable than temporal envelope cues when sounds are masked by competing sounds such as noise or presented at high intensities, and may play a role in robust sound coding at the low (brainstem) level. His work conducted with people with sensorineural hearing loss and computational models of auditory perception showed how cochlear lesions may alter the neural representation of TFS cues in the early stages of the auditory system, even in regions of the pure-tone audiogram where hearing is clinically considered as normal.

Since 2020, his work has reoriented towards human auditory ecology, a new field promoting research on the human ability to perceive ecological processes at work in natural environments. This line of research invites hearing scientists to collaborate actively with soundscape ecologists or ecoacousticians, earth scientists and geographers in order to characterise acoustic statistics of natural scenes, and study how humans listen to natural soundscapes and perceive subtle/transient auditory attributes of natural scenes such as habitat, moment of the day, season or biodiversity and effects of sensorineural hearing loss on these capacities.

== See also ==
- Temporal envelope and fine structure
