= Mateusz Garniewicz =

Polish alpine skier (born 1990)

Personal information
- Born: 15 January 1990 (age 36) Poznań, Poland
Medal record
Alpine skiing
Representing Poland

Mateusz Garniewicz (born 15 January 1990 in Poznań, Poland) is an alpine skier from Poland. He competed for Poland at the 2014 Winter Olympics in the alpine skiing events.
