= Dylan Hoogerwerf =

Dutch speed skater

Personal information
- Nationality: Dutch
- Born: 9 August 1995 (age 30) Delft, Netherlands
- Height: 188 cm (6 ft 2 in)
- Weight: 79 kg (174 lb)

Sport
- Country: Netherlands
- Sport: Short track speed skating
Medal record
European Championships
Gold medal – first place	2017 Turin	5000 m relay
Gold medal – first place	2018 Dresden	5000 m relay
Gold medal – first place	2021 Gdansk	5000 m relay
Silver medal – second place	2017 Turin	500 m
Silver medal – second place	2020 Debrecen	5000 m relay

Dylan Hoogerwerf (born 9 August 1995) is a Dutch short track speed skater.

He qualified for the men's 500 metres and men's 5000 m relay event at the 2018 Winter Olympics.

== Biography ==
Hoogerwerf started doing short track speed skating in The Hague, when he was nine years old.

Hoogerwerf studies graphic design at the Friesland College in Heerenveen.
