= Chen Guang =

Chinese short track speed skater

Personal information
- Born: 3 February 1995 (age 31) Jilin, China

Sport
- Country: China
- Sport: Short track speed skating

Achievements and titles
- Personal best(s): 500m: 41.666 (2014); 1000m: 1:28.458 (2014); 1500m: 2:18.392 (2012)
Medal record
Men's short track speed skating
Representing China
World Junior Championships
Gold medal – first place	2014 Erzurum	3000 m relay
Silver medal – second place	2012 Melbourne	3000 m relay
Winter Universiade
Gold medal – first place	2015 Granada	5000 m relay
Gold medal – first place	2017 Almaty	5000 m relay
Bronze medal – third place	2015 Granada	500 m
Bronze medal – third place	2015 Granada	1000 m
Bronze medal – third place	2015 Granada	1500 m

Chen Guang (Chinese: 陈光; born 3 February 1995 in Jilin) is a Chinese male short track speed skater.
