= Yuki Kikuchi =

Japanese short track speed skater

Personal information
- Born: 24 July 1990 (age 36) Minamiaiki, Nagano, Japan
- Height: 1.60 m (5 ft 3 in)
- Weight: 54 kg (119 lb)

Sport
- Country: Japan
- Sport: Short track speed skating

Yuki Kikuchi (菊池 悠希, Kikuchi Yūki; born 24 July 1990) is a Japanese short track speed skater who competed in the 2018 Winter Olympics.
