= Maria Bedareva =

Russian alpine skier (born 1992)

Personal information
- Born: 3 March 1992 (age 34) Karaginsky District, Russia
- Height: 1.70 m (5 ft 7 in)
- Weight: 70 kg (154 lb)

Sport
- Country: Russia
- Sport: Alpine skiing

Maria Bedareva (born 3 March 1992 in Karaginsky District, Russia) is an alpine skier from Russia. She competed for Russia at the 2014 Winter Olympics in the alpine skiing events.
