= Pavla Klicnarová =

Czech alpine ski racer (born 1988)

Pavla Klicnarová (born 2 January 1988 in Náchod) is a Czech alpine ski racer.
