= Sofiya Vlasova =

Ukrainian speed skater

Personal information
- Born: October 10, 1991 (age 34) Kyiv, Ukraine
- Height: 5 ft 6 in (168 cm)
- Weight: 126 lb (57 kg)

Sport
- Country: Ukraine
- Sport: Short track speed skating

Achievements and titles
- Highest world ranking: 42 (1000m)

Sofiya Vlasova (born October 10, 1991, in Kyiv) is a Ukrainian short-track speed-skater.

Vlasova competed at the 2014 Winter Olympics for Ukraine. In the 1000 metres she was fourth in her heat, finishing 26th overall.

As of September 2014, Vlasova's best performance at the World Championships came in 2012, when she finished 21st in the 1000m.

As of September 2014, Vlasova's top World Cup ranking is 42nd, in the 1000 metres in 2013–14.
