= Roksana Tymchenko =

Ukrainian alpine skier (born 1991)

Personal information
- Full name: Roksana Tymchenko
- Born: 15 June 1991 (age 35) Ukraine

Sport
- Sport: Skiing
- Updated on 15 February 2013

Roksana Tymchenko (born 15 June 1991) is an alpine skier from Ukraine.

== Performances ==
Level	Year	Event	SL	GS	SG	DH	SC	T
JWSC	2008	Formigal, Spain	56	76	72			
AWSC	2013	Schladming, Austria	69	60				
