= Michiko =

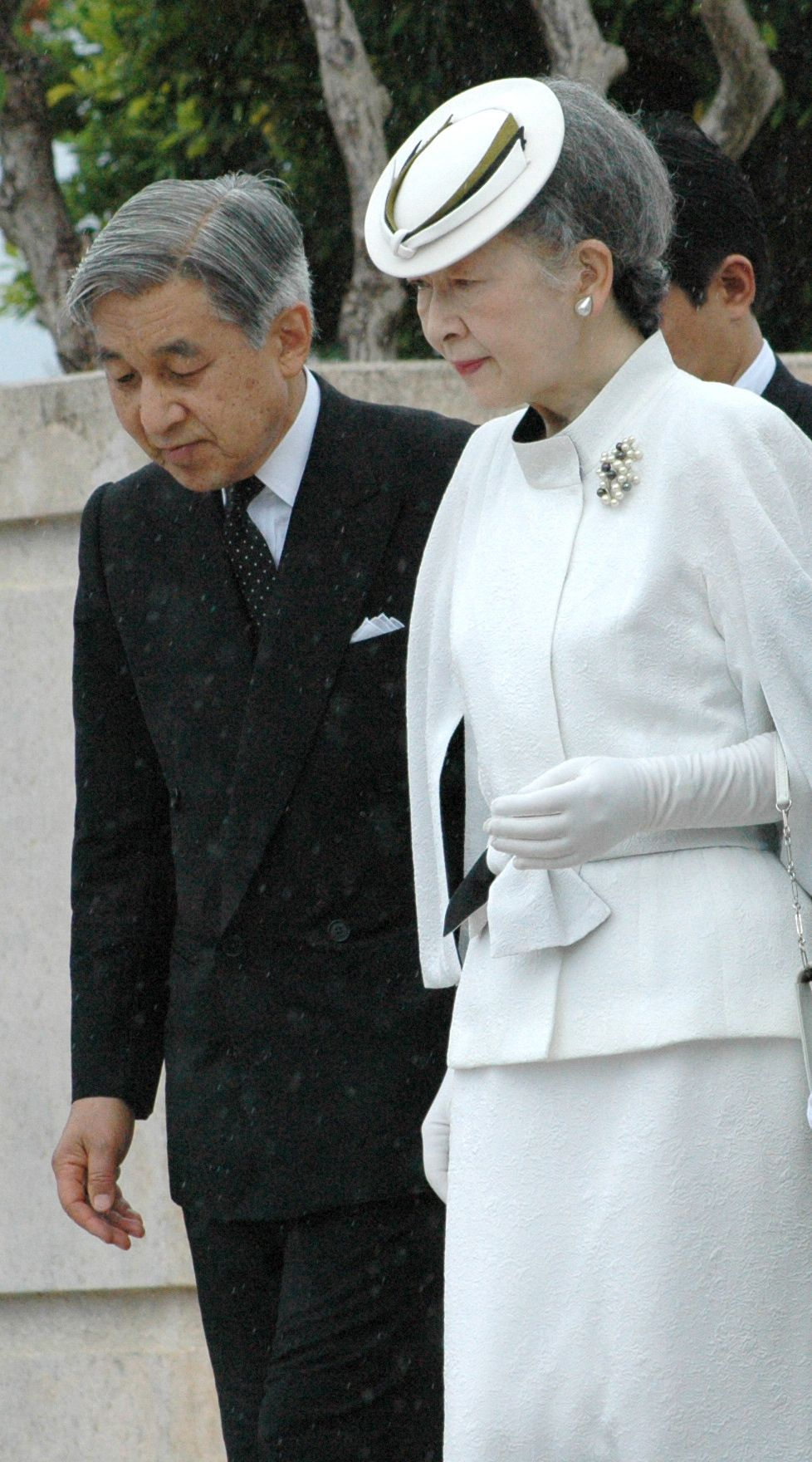
- Empress Michiko (right), and her husband Emperor Akihito
- Gender: Female
- Language: Japanese

Origin
- Meaning: Different meanings depending on the kanji used
- Region of origin: Japan

Other names
- Related names: Michiyo; Michiru; Machiko; Michie; Michi; Michirō; Michio; Michihiko; Michiya

Michiko is a traditional female Japanese given name. Although written romanized the same way, the Japanese language written forms (kanji, katakana, hiragana) can be different. Common forms include:

- 美智子 — "beautiful wise child"
- 美千子 — "child of a thousand beauties"
- 見知子 — "child of recognition"
- 道子 — "child of the way"
- 路子 — "child of the road"
- 倫子 — "child of morals"
- 皆子 — "child of all"
- 通子 — "child of passage"

Phonetic spellings (no particular meaning):

- みちこ (in hiragana)
- ミチコ (in katakana)

== People ==
- Michiko Shoda (正田 美智子), later Empress Michiko of Japan
- Michiko Fujiwara (藤原 道子; 1900–1983), Japanese nurse and politician
- Michiko Fukushima (長谷川-福島 實智子), a Japanese sport shooter from Kumaishi, Hokkaidō Japan
- Michiko Godai (五大 路子), Japanese actress from Yokohama, Japan
- Michiko Hada (羽田 美智子), an actress from Mitsukaido, Japan
- Michiko Hattori (服部道子), Japanese professional golfer and former Player of the Year on the Japan LPGA
- Michiko Hamamura (浜村 美智子), Japanese singer and actress from Osaka, Japan
- Michiko Hirai (平井 道子; 1935–1984), Japanese actress and voice actress
- Horibe Michiko (堀部美智子), a Japanese ski mountaineer and telemark skier
- Michiko Inukai (犬養 道子), Japanese Roman-Catholic author and philanthropist
- Michiko Ishii (石井 道子; 1933–2012), Japanese politician
- Michiko Ishimure (石牟礼道子), a Japanese writer
- Michiko Itatani (born 1948), Japanese artist
- Michiko Kakutani (角谷 美智子), an American literary critic
- Michiko Kanba (樺 美智子; 1937–1960), Japanese communist
- Michiko Kashiwabara (柏原 理子), a Japanese cross-country skier who competed at the 2010 Winter Olympic Games
- Michiko Katagiri, paralympic swimmer from Japan
- Michiko Kawai (河合 美智子; born 1968), Japanese actress and singer
- Michiko Kichise (吉瀬 美智子), a Japanese actress
- Michiko Kon (今道子), Japanese photographer
- Michiko Kono, Japanese former cricketer
- Michiko Koshino (小篠 美智子), a Japanese fashion designer
- Michiko Maeda (前田通子), Japanese film and television actress from Osaka
- Michiko Matsuda (松田 理子; born 1966), former Japanese football player
- Michiko Matsumoto (松本 路子), Japanese photographer
- Michiko Nagai (永井路子), Japanese historical fiction writer
- Michiko Neya (根谷 美智子), a voice actress from Echizen, Fukui Japan
- Michiko Nishiwaki (西脇 美智子), a Japanese stunt woman, actress, martial artist, and former female bodybuilder
- Michiko Nomura (野村 道子, born 1938), a voice actress
- Michiko Naruke (なるけ みちこ), a Japanese video game composer
- Michiko Okada, Japanese professional golfer who played on the LPGA of Japan Tour
- Michiko Omukai (大向 美智子; born 1975), Japanese former professional wrestler
- Michiko Shimizu (athlete) (志水 見千子; born 1970), Japanese long-distance runner
- Michiko Shimizu (entertainer) (清水 ミチコ; born 1960), Japanese television personality, comedian and actress
- Michiko Shiokawa (塩川 美知子), retired Japanese volleyball player who competed in the 1972 Summer Olympics
- Michiko Suganuma (菅沼 三千子), Kamakura-bori now Wagae-nuri artist from Japan
- Michiko Tanaka (田中路子, 1913–1988), a Japanese actress and singer who was married to German stage and film actor Viktor de Kowa
- Michiko Tomabechi (苫米地 美智子; born 1980), Japanese curler
- Michiko Ueno (上野 通子; born 1958), Japanese politician
- Michiko Yamamoto (山本 道子; 1936–2026), Japanese writer and poet
- Michiko Yamamoto (screenwriter) (born 1979), Filipino screenwriter
- Michiko Yamawaki (山脇 道子; 1910–2000), Japanese designer and textile artist
- Michiko Yokote (横手 美智子), a Japanese screenwriter

== Fictional characters ==
- Michiko Malandro (ミチコ・マランドロ), protagonist of the anime series Michiko to Hatchin
- Michiko Sawada (沢田・ミチ子), a character from manga and anime Perman
- Michiko, a character from anime Dennō Coil
- Michiko Ueda, a character from the book The Knox Chronicles
- Daimon Michiko (大門未知子), the eponymous protagonist of the successful Japanese television series Doctor-X: Surgeon Michiko Daimon (ドクターX〜外科医・大門未知子〜) (2012–2021)
- Michiko (美智子), a hunter in the video game Identity V
- Michiko Arasaka, member of the Arasaka family from Mike Podsmith Cyberpunk franchise.*
