= Cross-country skiing at the 2015 Winter Universiade – Women's 15 km free mass start =

The women's 15 km free mass start competition of the 2015 Winter Universiade was held at the Sporting Centre FIS Štrbské Pleso on January 31, 2015.

== Results ==
Rank	Bib	Athlete	Country	Time	Deficit
1st place, gold medalist(s)	17	Anastassiya Slonova	Kazakhstan	44:47.1	
2nd place, silver medalist(s)	1	Svetlana Nikolaeva	Russia	44:55.9	+8.8
3rd place, bronze medalist(s)	4	Ewelina Marcisz	Poland	45:02.3	+15.2
4	7	Viktoria Karkina	Russia	45:15.9	+28.8
5	15	Maryna Antsybor	Ukraine	45:51.2	+1:04.1
6	19	Iris Pessey	France	45:51.2	+1:04.1
7	16	Olga Mandrika	Kazakhstan	45:59.5	+1:12.4
8	10	Sandra Schützová	Czech Republic	46:04.0	+1:16.9
9	9	Kateryna Serdyuk	Ukraine	46:20.1	+1:33.0
10	34	Justyna Mordaska	Poland	46:22.4	+1:35.3
11	5	Lilia Vasilieva	Russia	46:28.4	+1:41.3
12	3	Anna Povoliaeva	Russia	46:31.4	+1:44.3
13	20	Kati Roivas	Finland	47:03.1	+2:16.0
14	12	Karolína Grohová	Czech Republic	47:06.2	+2:19.1
15	28	Tatyana Ossipova	Kazakhstan	47:18.9	+2:31.8
16	2	Marion Buillet	France	47:32.4	+2:45.3
17	26	Marina Matrossova	Kazakhstan	47:32.6	+2:45.5
18	6	Yukari Tanaka	Japan	47:59.2	+3:12.1
19	33	Julia Devaux	France	48:03.2	+3:16.1
20	24	Kateřina Beroušková	Czech Republic	48:12.3	+3:25.2
21	11	Lali Kvaratskhelia	Russia	48:15.7	+3:28.6
22	18	Maki Ohdaira	Japan	48:26.9	+3:39.8
23	8	Anastasia Vlasova	Russia	48:37.1	+3:50.0
24	14	Jessica Yeaton	Australia	48:46.5	+3:59.4
25	22	Yana Hrakovich	Belarus	49:04.7	+4:17.6
26	37	Tamara Ebel	Kazakhstan	49:10.1	+4:23.0
27	21	Chantal Carlen	Switzerland	49:27.7	+4:40.6
28	27	Elise Langkås	Norway	49:33.1	+4:46.0
29	29	Oksana Shatalova	Ukraine	49:33.2	+4:46.1
30	13	Kozue Takizawa	Japan	49:46.3	+4:59.2
31	39	Valentina Ebel	Kazakhstan	49:54.0	+5:06.9
32	47	Oleksandra Andrieieva	Ukraine	50:07.1	+5:20.0
33	40	Martyna Galewicz	Poland	50:19.7	+5:32.6
34	44	Hao Ri	China	50:27.2	+5:40.1
35	35	Eva Segečová	Slovakia	50:58.2	+6:11.1
36	25	Šárka Klaclová	Czech Republic	51:28.8	+6:41.7
37	36	Elise Sulser	United States	51:47.1	+7:00.0
38	23	Fiona Hughes	Great Britain	52:18.9	+7:31.8
39	31	Barbora Klementová	Slovakia	52:37.4	+7:50.3
40	46	Natalia Grzebisz	Poland	53:17.1	+8:30.0
41	42	Mariya Nasyko	Ukraine	55:38.1	+10:51.0
42	51	Catherine Schmidt	United States	56:09.6	+11:22.5
43	30	Anna Trnka	Australia	56:47.0	+11:59.9
44	52	Enkhbayaryn Ariuntungalag	Mongolia	56:58.5	+12:11.4
45	45	Sierra Jech	United States	58:00.0	+13:12.9
46	32	Lee Young-ae	South Korea	58:01.5	+13:14.4
47	50	Jadambaagiin Khaliunaa	Mongolia	59:46.3	+14:59.2
48	38	Shin Ji-soo	South Korea	1:06:14.9	+21:27.8
49	43	Cha I-re	South Korea	1:07:28.0	+22:40.9
	41	Kristin Faye Eriksen	Norway	Did not finish	
	53	Yonca Karademir	Turkey	Did not finish	
	48	Britta Schroeter	United States	Did not start	
	49	Yara Thomas	United States	Did not start	
	54	Viktoriya Olekh	Ukraine	Did not start	
