= Cross-country skiing at the 2015 Winter Universiade – Women's 5 km classic =

Event at winter competition at Pleso

The women's 5 km classic competition of the 2015 Winter Universiade was held at the Sporting Centre FIS Štrbské Pleso on January 28.

== Results ==
| Rank | Bib | Athlete | Country | Time | Deficit | Note |
|---|---|---|---|---|---|---|
| 1st place, gold medalist(s) | 63 | Oxana Usatova | Russia | 13:09.5 | | |
| 2nd place, silver medalist(s) | 47 | Anastassiya Slonova | Kazakhstan | 13:27.6 | +18.1 | |
| 3rd place, bronze medalist(s) | 60 | Lilia Vasilieva | Russia | 13:31.4 | +21.9 | |
| 4 | 57 | Kateryna Serdyuk | Ukraine | 13:41.6 | +32.1 | |
| 5 | 61 | Ewelina Marcisz | Poland | 13:43.3 | +33.8 | |
| 6 | 42 | Anna Stoyan | Kazakhstan | 13:58.3 | +48.8 | |
| 7 | 58 | Anastasia Vlasova | Russia | 13:58.6 | +49.1 | |
| 8 | 62 | Anna Povoliaeva | Russia | 14:00.7 | +51.2 | |
| 9 | 52 | Viktoriya Lanchakova | Kazakhstan | 14:01.5 | +52 | |
| 10 | 56 | Sandra Schützová | Czech Republic | 14:02.9 | +53.4 | |
| 11 | 21 | Marcela Marcisz | Poland | 14:07.8 | +58.3 | |
| 12 | 50 | Elsa Airaksinen | Finland | 14:08.1 | +58.6 | |
| 13 | 9 | Tatjana Stiffler | Switzerland | 14:11.8 | +1:02.3 | |
| 14 | 48 | Olga Mandrika | Kazakhstan | 14:12.2 | +1:02.7 | |
| 15 | 54 | Karolína Grohová | Czech Republic | 14:15.3 | +1:05.8 | |
| 16 | 32 | Tatyana Ossipova | Kazakhstan | 14:16 | +1:06.5 | |
| 17 | 44 | Dominika Bielecka | Poland | 14:18.8 | +1:09.3 | |
| 18 | 49 | Maryna Antsybor | Ukraine | 14:22.6 | +1:13.1 | |
| 19 | 59 | Yukari Tanaka | Japan | 14:25.7 | +1:16.2 | |
| 20 | 41 | Kati Roivas | Finland | 14:26.2 | +1;16.7 | |
| 21 | 64 | Ksenia Podoprigora | Russia | 14:26.6 | +1:17.1 | |
| 22 | 38 | Fiona Hughes | Great Britain | 14:28.7 | +1:19.2 | |
| 23 | 25 | Elise Sulser | United States | 14:29.2 | +1:19.7 | |
| 24 | 34 | Marina Matrossova | Kazakhstan | 14:30.7 | +1;21.2 | |
| 25 | 2 | Viktoriya Olekh | Ukraine | 14:31.8 | +1;22.3 | |
| 26 | 53 | Kozue Takizawa | Japan | 14:32.1 | +1:22.6 | |
| 27 | 45 | Urszula Łętocha | Poland | 14:33.5 | +1:24 | |
| 28 | 37 | Kateřina Beroušková | Czech Republic | 14:37.9 | +1:28.4 | |
| 29 | 43 | Iris Pessey | France | 14:40.4 | +1:30.9 | |
| 30 | 20 | Martyna Galewicz | Poland | 14:40.7 | +1:31.2 | |
| 31 | 31 | Oksana Shatalova | Ukraine | 14:41.1 | +1:31.6 | |
| 32 | 30 | Anna Trnka | Australia | 14:43.6 | +1:34.1 | |
| 33 | 55 | Lali Kvaratshkhelia | Russia | 14:45.8 | +1:36.3 | |
| 34 | 27 | Julia Devaux | France | 14:46.3 | +1:36.8 | |
| 35 | 46 | Maki Ohdaira | Japan | 14:48.2 | +1:38.7 | |
| 36 | 51 | Jessica Yeaton | Australia | 14:48.5 | +1:39 | |
| 37 | 40 | Chantal Carlen | Switzerland | 14:59 | +1:49.5 | |
| 38 | 39 | Yana Hrakovich | Belarus | 15:00.1 | +1:50.6 | |
| 39 | 29 | Barbora Klementová | Slovakia | 15:01.5 | +1:52 | |
| 40 | 18 | Mariia Nasyko | Ukraine | 15:01.9 | +1:52.4 | |
| 41 | 33 | Elise Langkås | Norway | 15:11.3 | +2:01.8 | |
| 42 | 13 | Oleksandra Andrieieva | Ukraine | 15:13.4 | +2:03.9 | |
| 43 | 26 | Eva Segečová | Czech Republic | 15:15.5 | +2:06 | |
| 44 | 15 | Hao Ri | China | 15:27.1 | +2:17.6 | |
| 45 | 4 | Chen Xu | China | 15:35.5 | +2:26 | |
| 46 | 35 | Šárka Klaclová | Czech Republic | 15:37.8 | +2:28.3 | |
| 47 | 3 | Enkhbayar Ariuntungalag | Mongolia | 15:49.2 | +2:39.7 | |
| 48 | 19 | Kristen Faye Eriksen | Norway | 15:52.2 | +2:42.7 | |
| 49 | 14 | Sierra Jech | United States | 16:08.1 | +2:58.6 | |
| 50 | 36 | Nam Seul-gi | South Korea | 16:27.6 | +3:18.1 | |
| 51 | 22 | Choe Shin-ae | South Korea | 16:40.7 | +3:31.2 | |
| 52 | 10 | Yara Thomas | United States | 16:50.4 | +3:40.9 | |
| 53 | 28 | Lee Young-ae | South Korea | 16:51.1 | +3:41.6 | |
| 54 | 24 | Yoo Dan-bi | South Korea | 17:07.2 | +3:57.7 | |
| 55 | 11 | Britta Schroeter | United States | 17:30.2 | +4:20.7 | |
| 56 | 6 | Jadambaa Khaliunaa | Mongolia | 17:31.2 | +4:21.7 | |
| 57 | 7 | Yonca Karademir | Turkey | 17:31.7 | +4:22.2 | |
| 58 | 17 | Natālija Kovaļova | Latvia | 17:53.9 | +4:44.4 | |
| 59 | 23 | Shin Ji-soo | South Korea | 18:05.5 | +4:56 | |
| 60 | 5 | Catherine Schmidt | United States | 18:10.2 | +5:00.7 | |
| 61 | 8 | Zhang Xue | China | 18:31.4 | +5:21.9 | |
| 62 | 12 | Olga Kovaļova | Latvia | 20:14 | +7:04.5 | |
| 63 | 1 | Leyla Turan | Turkey | 20:27.7 | +7:18.2 | |
| 64 | 16 | Cha I-re | South Korea | 21:36.7 | +8:27.2 | |
