= Cross-country skiing at the 2015 Winter Universiade – Women's sprint free =

Women's sprint free at the 2015 Winter Universiade
- Date: 2015,01,25
- Competitors: 59 from 19 nations

Medalists
gold medal	Anastassiya Slonova	Kazakhstan
silver medal	Ewelina Marcisz	Poland
bronze medal	Svetlana Nikolaeva	Russia

The women's sprint free competition of the 2015 Winter Universiade was held at the Sporting Centre FIS Štrbské Pleso on January 25.

== Schedule ==
All times are Central European Time (UTC+01:00)

Date	Time	Event
Sunday, 25 January 2015	10:00	Qualification
Sunday, 25 January 2015	12:00	Quarterfinal 1
Sunday, 25 January 2015	12:05	Quarterfinal 2
Sunday, 25 January 2015	12:10	Quarterfinal 3
Sunday, 25 January 2015	12:15	Quarterfinal 4
Sunday, 25 January 2015	12:20	Quarterfinal 5
Sunday, 25 January 2015	12:50	Semifinal 1
Sunday, 25 January 2015	12:56	Semifinal 2
Sunday, 25 January 2015	13:13	Final

== Results ==
=== Qualification ===
Rank	Bib	Athlete	Country	Time	Deficit	Note
1	8	Ewelina Marcisz	Poland	3:07.41		Q
2	3	Anna Povoliaeva	Russia	3:09.17	+1.76	Q
3	7	Karolína Grohová	Czech Republic	3:10.58	+3.17	Q
4	16	Kateryna Serdyuk	Ukraine	3:12.43	+5.02	Q
5	11	Sandra Schützová	Czech Republic	3:12.47	+5.06	Q
6	9	Leena Nurmi	Finland	3:13.84	+6.43	Q
7	15	Anastassiya Slonova	Kazakhstan	3:14.00	+6.59	Q
8	18	Maryna Antsybor	Ukraine	3:14.95	+7.54	Q
9	1	Svetlana Nikolaeva	Russia	3:14.96	+7.55	Q
10	14	Marcela Marcisz	Poland	3:15.60	+8.19	Q
11	12	Jessica Yeaton	Australia	3:15.72	+8.31	Q
12	13	Urszula Łętocha	Poland	3:16.29	+8.88	Q
13	2	Marion Buillet	France	3:17.32	+9.91	Q
14	5	Lilia Vasilieva	Russia	3:17.76	+10.35	Q
15	27	Maaret Pajunoja	Finland	3:17.84	+10.43	Q
16	6	Oxana Usatova	Russia	3:17.87	+10.46	Q
17	19	Victoria Karkina	Russia	3:18.14	+10.73	Q
18	17	Viktoriya Lanchakova	Kazakhstan	3:18.47	+11.06	Q
19	4	Tatjana Stiffler	Switzerland	3:19.40	+11.99	Q
20	23	Justyna Mordaska	Poland	3:19.51	+12.10	Q
21	10	Lali Kvaratskhelia	Russia	3:20.67	+13.26	Q
22	49	Kateřina Beroušková	Czech Republic	3:22.25	+14.84	Q
23	20	Barbora Klementová	Slovakia	3:22.48	+15.07	Q
24	25	Tatyana Ossipova	Kazakhstan	3:23.86	+16.45	Q
25	35	Julia Devaux	France	3:24.24	+16.83	Q
26	28	Šárka Klaclová	Czech Republic	3:24.97	+17.56	Q
27	22	Kozue Takizawa	Japan	3:28.93	+21.52	Q
28	29	Kati Roivas	Finland	3:29.11	+21.70	Q
29	24	Oksana Shatalov	Ukraine	3:29.18	+21.77	Q
30	33	Chantal Carlen	Switzerland	3:29.99	+22.58	Q
31	34	Tamara Ebel	Kazakhstan	3:30.11	+22.70	
32	31	Yukari Tanaka	Japan	3:30.72	+23.31	
33	26	Fiona Hughes	Great Britain	3:33.32	+25.91	
34	37	Eva Segečová	Slovakia	3:33.38	+25.97	
35	30	Anna Trnka	Australia	3:34.23	+26.82	
36	52	Viktoriya Olekh	Ukraine	3:35.77	+28.36	
37	32	Valentina Ebel	Kazakhstan	3:35.85	+28.44	
38	51	Oleksandra Andrieieva	Ukraine	3:36.07	+28.66	
39	39	Mariia Nasyko	Ukraine	3:36.23	+28.82	
40	21	Yana Hrakovich	Belarus	3:38.09	+30.68	
41	43	Sierra Jech	United States	3:39.06	+31.65	
42	36	Maki Ohdaira	Japan	3:39.71	+32.30	
43	50	Elise Sulser	United States	3:41.02	+33.61	
44	56	Chen Xu	China	3:44.29	+36.88	
45	53	Yonca Karademir	Turkey	3:46.92	+39.51	
46	54	Enkhbayar Ariuntungalag	Mongolia	3:52.98	+45.57	
47	40	Hao Ri	China	3:54.37	+46.96	
48	58	Zhang Xue	China	3:54.39	+46.98	
49	59	Catherine Schmitt	United States	3:54.66	+47.25	
50	46	Yara Thomas	United States	3:58.98	+51.57	
51	42	Choe Shin-ae	South Korea	4:00.66	+54.25	
52	44	Britta Schroeter	United States	4:01.95	+55.54	
53	41	Lee Yeong-ae	South Korea	4:02.87	+56.46	
54	38	Natālija Kovaļova	Latvia	4:03.35	+56.94	
55	55	Jadambaa Khaliunaa	Mongolia	4:09.67	+1:03.26	
56	47	Olga Kovaļova	Latvia	4:12.72	+1:06.31	
57	57	Leyla Turan	Turkey	4:18.72	+1:12.31	
58	48	Shin Ji-soo	South Korea	4:25.74	+1:19.33	
59	45	Cha I-re	South Korea	4:28.65	+1:22.24	

=== Finals ===
==== Quarterfinals ====
Quarterfinal 1

Rank	Seed	Athlete	Country	Time	Deficit	Note
1	1	Ewelina Marcisz	Poland	3:22.06		Q
2	11	Jessica Yeaton	Australia	3:23.99	+1.93	Q
3	10	Marcela Marcisz	Poland	3:24.76	+2.70	
4	20	Justyna Mordaska	Poland	3:26.18	+4.12	
5	21	Lali Kvaratskhelia	Russia	3:27.04	+4.98	
6	30	Chantal Carlen	Switzerland	3:39.23	+17.17	

Quarterfinal 2

Rank	Seed	Athlete	Country	Time	Deficit	Note
1	14	Lilia Vasilieva	Russia	3:23.09		Q
2	7	Anastassiya Slonova	Kazakhstan	3:23.80	+0.71	Q
3	4	Kateryna Serdyuk	Ukraine	3:24.29	+1.20	
4	17	Viktoria Karkina	Russia	3:24.67	+1.58	
5	24	Tatyana Ossipova	Kazakhstan	3:30.82	+7.73	
6	27	Kozue Takizawa	Japan	3:45.44	+22.35	

Quarterfinal 3

Rank	Seed	Athlete	Country	Time	Deficit	Note
1	5	Sandra Schützová	Czech Republic	3:21.32		Q
2	6	Leena Nurmi	Finland	3:21.39	+0.07	Q
3	15	Maaret Pajunoja	Finland	3:22.46	+1.14	LL
4	16	Oxana Usatova	Kazakhstan	3:23.27	+1.95	
5	25	Julia Devaux	France	3:23.91	+2.59	
6	26	Šárka Klaclová	Czech Republic	3:29.28	+7.96	

Quarterfinal 4

Rank	Seed	Athlete	Country	Time	Deficit	Note
1	2	Anna Povoliaeva	Russia	3:21.28		Q
2	9	Svetlana Nikolaeva	Russia	3:21.87	+0.59	Q
3	19	Tatjana Stiffler	Switzerland	3:22.70	+1.42	
4	12	Urszula Łętocha	Poland	3:23.15	+1.87	
5	22	Kateřina Beroušková	Czech Republic	3:24.15	+2.87	
6	29	Oksana Shatalova	Ukraine	3:40.52	+19.24	

Quarterfinal 5

Rank	Seed	Athlete	Country	Time	Deficit	Note
1	13	Marion Buillet	France	3:20.87		Q
2	3	Karolína Grohová	Czech Republic	3:21.35	+0.48	Q
3	8	Maryna Antsybor	Ukraine	3:21.44	+0.57	LL
4	23	Barbora Klementová	Slovakia	3:31.23	+10.36	
5	28	Kati Roivas	Finland	3:36.23	+15.36	
6	18	Viktoriya Lanchakova	Kazakhstan	4:00.10	+39.23	

==== Semifinals ====
Semifinal 1

Rank	Seed	Athlete	Country	Time	Deficit	Note
1	1	Ewelina Marcisz	Poland	3:22.33		Q
2	7	Anastassiya Slonova	Kazakhstan	3:23.26	+0.93	Q
3	14	Lilia Vasilieva	Russia	3:24.16	+1.83	
4	11	Jessica Yeaton	Australia	3:25.69	+3.36	
5	15	Maaret Pajunoja	Finland	3:30.56	+8.23	
6	5	Sandra Schützová	Czech Republic	3:39.69	+17.36	

Semifinal 2

Rank	Seed	Athlete	Country	Time	Deficit	Note
1	3	Karolína Grohová	Czech Republic	3:18.56		Q
2	6	Leena Nurmi	Finland	3:18.67	+0.11	Q
3	9	Svetlana Nikolaeva	Russia	3:18.69	+0.13	LL
4	13	Marion Buillet	France	3:19.04	+0.48	LL
5	2	Anna Povoliaeva	Russia	3:19.31	+0.75	
6	8	Maryna Antsybor	Ukraine	3:22.13	+3.57	

==== Final ====
Rank	Seed	Athlete	Country	Time	Deficit	Note
1st place, gold medalist(s)	7	Anastassiya Slonova	Kazakhstan	3:22.75		
2nd place, silver medalist(s)	1	Ewelina Marcisz	Poland	3:22.93	+0.18	
3rd place, bronze medalist(s)	9	Svetlana Nikolaeva	Russia	3:23.17	+0.42	
4	13	Marion Bulliet	France	3:23.23	+0.48	
5	3	Karolína Grohová	Czech Republic	3:26.72	+3.97	
6	6	Leena Nurmi	Finland	3:27.74	+4.99	
