= Cross-country skiing at the 2015 Winter Universiade – Women's 3 x 5 km relay =

The women's 3×5 km classic competition of the 2015 Winter Universiade was held at the Sporting Centre FIS Štrbské Pleso on January 30.

== Results ==
Rank	Bib	Nation	Skiers	Time	Deficit
1st place, gold medalist(s)	9	Russia	Oxana Usatova (18:23.5); Viktoria Karkina (14:49.5); Svetlana Nikolaeva (14:34.1)	47:47.1	
2nd place, silver medalist(s)	2	Kazakhstan	Anna Stoyan (18:46.6); Viktoriya Lanchakova (15:04.2); Anastassiya Slonova (14:39.9)	48:30.7	+43.6
3rd place, bronze medalist(s)	8	France	Iris Pessey (19:05.6); Julia Devaux (15:12.4); Marion Buillet (15:00.2)	49:18.2	+1:31.1
4	7	Poland	Marcela Marcisz (19:28.9); Martyna Galewicz (15:04.8); Justyna Mordaska (14:58.7)	49:32.4	+1:45.3
5	3	Czech Republic	Karolína Grohová (18:47.5); Kateřina Beroušková (15:56); Sandra Schützová (15:03.3)	49:46.8	+1:59.7
6	1	Ukraine	Kateryna Serdyuk (18:51.4); Viktoriya Olekh (16:28.2); Maryna Antsybor (14:51.2)	50:10.8	+2:23.7
7	4	Finland	Elsa Airaksinen (19:42.7); Kati Roivas (15:23.6); Maaret Pajunoja (16:08)	51:14.3	+3:27.2
8	6	Japan	Kozue Takizawa (20:33.2); Yukari Tanaka (15:40.9); Maki Ohdaira (15:51.5)	52:05.6	+4:18.5
9	13	Slovakia	Barbora Klementová (21:05.4); Eva Segečová (16:04.1); Katarína Krišicová (17:02.5)	54:12	+6:24.9
10	11	China	Hao Ri (20;52.2); Zhang Xue (18:39.8); Chen Xu (17:04)	56:36	+8:48.9
11	10	South Korea	Choe Shin-ae (23:46.5); Yoo Dan-bi (19:06.7); Nam Seul-gi (17:09.6)	1:00:02.8	+12:15.7
12	12	United States	Yara Thomas (23:04.4); Catherine Schmidt (18:00.3); Britta Schroeter (19:47)	1:00:51.7	+13:04.6
	5	Norway	Kristen Faye Eriksen (20:30.6); Elise Langkås (15:35.6); Rikke Hald Andersen	DNF	
