= Cross-country skiing at the 2015 Winter Universiade – Mixed team sprint classic =

The mixed team sprint classic competition of the 2015 Winter Universiade was held at the Sporting Centre FIS Štrbské Pleso on January 26.

== Results ==
=== Semifinals ===
Semifinal 1

Rank	Heat	Bib	Country	Athletes	Time	Note
1	1	1	Russia I	Anton Gafarov; Svetlana Nikolaeva	19:54.17	Q
2	1	4	Finland I	Aku Nikander; Leena Nurmi	19:59.25	Q
3	1	6	Poland I	Maciej Staręga; Marcela Marcisz	20:00.08	LL
4	1	5	Kazakhstan II	Roman Ragozin; Anastassiya Slonova	20:25.33	LL
5	1	2	Japan I	Hiroyuki Miyazawa; Kozue Takizawa	20:30.39	LL
6	1	11	Slovakia I	Andrej Segec; Barbora Klementová	20:30.82	
7	1	10	Belarus	Pavel Maruha; Yana Hrakovich	20:59.15	
8	1	7	France II	Bertrand Hamoumraoui; Iris Pessey	20:59.86	
9	1	3	Japan II	Tomoki Satou; Yukari Tanaka	21:10.28	
10	1	14	Ukraine II	Andriy Marchenko; Viktoriya Olekh	21:11.31	
11	1	12	Ukraine I	Oleg Yoltukhovskyy; Oksana Shatalova	21:24.98	
12	1	8	Finland II	Aki Kauppinen; Elsa Airaksinen	21:51.66	
13	1	13	China I	Shang Jincai; Hao Ri	21:58.05	
14	1	9	Norway	Jorgen Grav; Kristin Faye Eriksen	22:11.91	
15	1	15	United States II	Benjamin Noren; Elise Sulser	23:22.06	
16	1	16	Mongolia II	Amarsanaa Baasansuren; Jadambaa Khaliunaa	24:58.47	

Semifinal 2

Rank	Heat	Bib	Country	Athletes	Time	Note
1	2	17	Russia II	Raul Shakirzianov; Anna Povoliaeva	19:56.52	Q
2	2	19	Czech Republic II	Jan Šrail; Karolína Grohová	19:57.51	Q
3	2	24	Kazakhstan I	Alexandr Malyshev; Anna Stoyan	19:58.33	LL
4	2	18	France I	Alexis Jeannerod; Marion Buillet	20:02.46	LL
5	2	22	Czech Republic I	Daniel Maka; Sandra Schützová	20:12.66	LL
6	2	26	Poland II	Jan Antolec; Justyna Mordaska	20:42.10	
7	2	20	Australia I	Phillip Bellingham; Jessica Yeaton	20:51.08	
8	2	21	Switzerland I	Philipp Spiess; Tatjana Stiffler	20:51.22	
9	2	23	Switzerland II	Arnaud du Pasquier; Chantal Carlen	21:11.45	
10	2	30	Slovakia II	Erik Urgela; Eva Segečová	21:26.65	
11	2	27	China II	Sun Qinghai; Chen Xu	22:15.08	
12	2	29	Australia II	Jackson Bursill; Anna Trnka	22:25.87	
13	2	32	Mongolia I	Boldyn Byambadorj; Enkhbayar Ariuntungalag	22:32.39	
14	2	31	United States I	Nathaniel Hough; Sierra Jech	22:50.31	
15	2	25	South Korea I	Ha Tae-bok; Nam Seul-gi	23:15.86	
16	2	28	South Korea II	Kim Hyun-woo; Yoo Dan-bi	23:53.54	

=== Final ===
Rank	Bib	Country	Athletes	Time	Deficit
1st place, gold medalist(s)	1	Russia I	Anton Gafarov; Svetlana Nikolaeva	19:56.98	
2nd place, silver medalist(s)	17	Russia II	Raul Shakirzianov; Anna Povoliaeva	20:00.84	+3.86
3rd place, bronze medalist(s)	19	Czech Republic II	Jan Šrail; Karolína Grohová	20:01.76	+4.78
4	4	Finland I	Aku Nikander; Leena Nurmi	20:17.28	+20.3
5	5	Kazakhstan II	Roman Ragozin; Anastassiya Slonova	20;20.74	+23.76
6	22	Czech Republic I	Daniel Maka; Sandra Schützová	20:24.51	+27.53
7	24	Kazakhstan I	Alexandr Malyshev; Anna Stoyan	20;25.05	+28.07
8	18	France I	Alexis Jeannerod; Marion Buillet	20:34.93	+37.95
9	6	Poland I	Maciej Staręga; Marcela Marcisz	20:42.28	+45.3
10	2	Japan I	Hiroyuki Miyazawa; Kozue Takizawa	21:30.7	+1:33.72
