= Michie =

Michie may refer to:

== People with the surname ==
- Alexander Michie (1833–1902), Scottish author, journalist, businessman, and traveller
- Archibald Michie (1813–1899), Australian lawyer, journalist, Agent-General, Attorney-General of Victoria and politician
- Bill Michie (1935–2017), British politician
- Chris Michie (1948–2003), American musician and composer
- David Michie (1928–2015), Scottish painter
- Dennis Michie (1870–1898), American football coach and U.S. Army officer killed in the Spanish–American War
- Donald Michie (1923–2007), British artificial intelligence researcher
- James Coutts Michie (1859–1919), Scottish painter
- James Michie (1927–2007), British poet and translator of Latin poetry
- Jimmy Michie (born 1971), English snooker player
- John Lundie Michie (1882–1946), Scottish professor of classics at the University of Queensland, Australia
- John Michie (born 1956), British actor
- Pat Michie, Australian psychologist and academic
- Peter Smith Michie (1839–1901), American military engineer and educator
- Ray Michie, Baroness Michie of Gallanach (1934–2008), British politician
- Susan Michie (born 1955), British professor of health psychology at University College London
- Thomas J. Michie (1896–1973), American lawyer and federal judge
- Thomas J. Michie Jr. (1931–2019), American attorney and politician

== People with the given name ==
- Michie Nakatani (born 1961), Japanese musician
- Michie Tomizawa (born 1961), Japanese voice actress and singer

== Places ==
- Michie, Tennessee
- Michie Stadium, American football stadium at the United States Military Academy in West Point, New York
- Michie Tavern, historic tavern near Charlottesville, Virginia
