= Katagiri =

Katagiri (written: 片桐) is a Japanese surname. Notable people with the surname include:

- Atsushi Katagiri (片桐 淳至; born 1983), Japanese footballer
- Dainin Katagiri (片桐 大忍; 1928–1990), Japanese Zen Buddhist
- Jin Katagiri (片桐 仁; born 1973), Japanese comedian, actor, sculptor and potter
- Katagiri Katsumoto (片桐 且元; 1556–1615), Japanese daimyō
- Michiko Katagiri, Japanese Paralympic swimmer
- Mikio Katagiri (片桐 幹雄; born 1955), Japanese alpine skier
- Mineo Katagiri (1919–2005), Japanese minister and activist
- Miyuki Katagiri (片桐 美雪; born 1948), Japanese alpine skier
- Shigeru Katagiri (片桐 茂; 1892–1944), Imperial Japanese Army general
- Kim Kataguiri (1996–Present), Brazilian Politician

== Fictional characters ==
- Billy Katagiri (ビリー・カタギリ), a character in the anime series Mobile Suit Gundam 00
- Himeko Katagiri (片桐 姫子), a character in the manga series Pani Poni
- Tsubasa Katagiri (片桐 ツバサ), a character in the anime series AKB0048
- Yūhi Katagiri (片桐 優姫), a character in the visual novel Akaneiro ni Somaru Saka
- Yūichi Katagiri (片切友一), the main protagonist of the manga series Tomodachi Game

== See also ==
- Katagiri Dam, a dam in Nagano Prefecture, Japan
