= Michirō =

- Gender: Male

Origin
- Origin: Japanese
- Meaning: Different meanings depending on the kanji used

Michirō, Michiro or Michirou (written: 道朗 or ミチロウ in katakana) is a masculine Japanese given name. Notable people with the name include:

- Michiro Endo (遠藤 ミチロウ; 1950–2019), Japanese musician, writer and activist
- Michiro Sato (佐藤 道朗; born 1967), Japanese composer, singer and musician
