= Cross-country skiing at the 2011 Asian Winter Games – Women's 4 × 5 kilometre relay =

Women's 4 × 5 kilometre relay at the 2011 Asian Winter Games
- Venue: Biathlon and Cross-Country Ski Complex
- Dates: 5 February 2011
- Competitors: 20 from 5 nations

Medalists
gold medal	Kazakhstan; Yelena Kolomina, Oxana Yatskaya, Anastassiya Slonova, Svetlana Malahova-Shishkina
silver medal	Japan; Madoka Natsumi, Masako Ishida, Yuki Kobayashi, Michiko Kashiwabara
bronze medal	China; Man Dandan, Li Hongxue, Li Xin, Liu Yuanyuan

The women's 4 × 5 kilometre relay at the 2011 Asian Winter Games was held on February 5, 2011 at Biathlon and Cross-Country Ski Complex, Almaty.

== Schedule ==
All times are Almaty Time (UTC+06:00)

Date	Time	Event
Saturday, 5 February 2011	12:35	Final

== Results ==
Rank	Team	Time
1st place, gold medalist(s)	Kazakhstan (KAZ)	1:01:45.1
	Yelena Kolomina	14:05.1
	Oxana Yatskaya	14:22.9
	Anastassiya Slonova	16:24.8
	Svetlana Malahova-Shishkina	16:52.3
2nd place, silver medalist(s)	Japan (JPN)	1:02:38.1
	Madoka Natsumi	14:22.1
	Masako Ishida	14:04.0
	Yuki Kobayashi	16:14.7
	Michiko Kashiwabara	17:57.3
3rd place, bronze medalist(s)	China (CHN)	1:05:34.8
	Man Dandan	14:26.0
	Li Hongxue	14:43.6
	Li Xin	17:37.4
	Liu Yuanyuan	18:47.8
4	South Korea (KOR)	1:11:51.2
	Nam Seul-gi	16:30.4
	Lee Chae-won	15:24.9
	Han Da-som	19:41.6
	Lee Eun-kyung	20:14.3
5	India (IND)	1:53:11.0
	Bhuwneshwari Thakur	23:32.3
	Mehjabeen Akhter	28:43.8
	Phuntsog Yangdon	28:16.7
	Masooda Akhter	32:38.2
