= Mishio =

Mishio is a Japanese name (meaning salt) which may refer to:

- Mishiodono (jinja & no mamori no kami), Mishiohama, Mishio kumiiresho, & Mishio yakisho, parts of the Ise Grand Shrine

== People ==
- Fukazawa Mishio, author of Duan Surk of the Dengeki Bunko publishing label
- Ogawa Mishio (born 1959), member of Love, Peace & Trance, band project of Haruomi Hosono
- Mishio Ishimoto, Japanese seismologist

== Characters ==
- Amano Mishio of Kanon
- Maeno Mishio of Mnemosyne
- Manami Mishio of Great Dangaioh

== See also ==
- Michio
