= Anastassiya Slonova =

Kazakhstani cross-country skier (born 1991)

Medal record

Women's cross country skiing

Representing Kazakhstan

U23 World Championships
| Silver medal – second place | 2013 Liberec | 10 km freestyle |

Asian Winter Games
| Gold medal – first place | 2011 Astana-Almaty | 4 × 5 km relay |

Winter Universiade
| Gold medal – first place | 2015 Štrbské Pleso | Individual sprint |
| Gold medal – first place | 2015 Štrbské Pleso | 15 km freestyle |
| Silver medal – second place | 2015 Štrbské Pleso | 5 km classical |
| Silver medal – second place | 2015 Štrbské Pleso | 3 × 5 km relay |

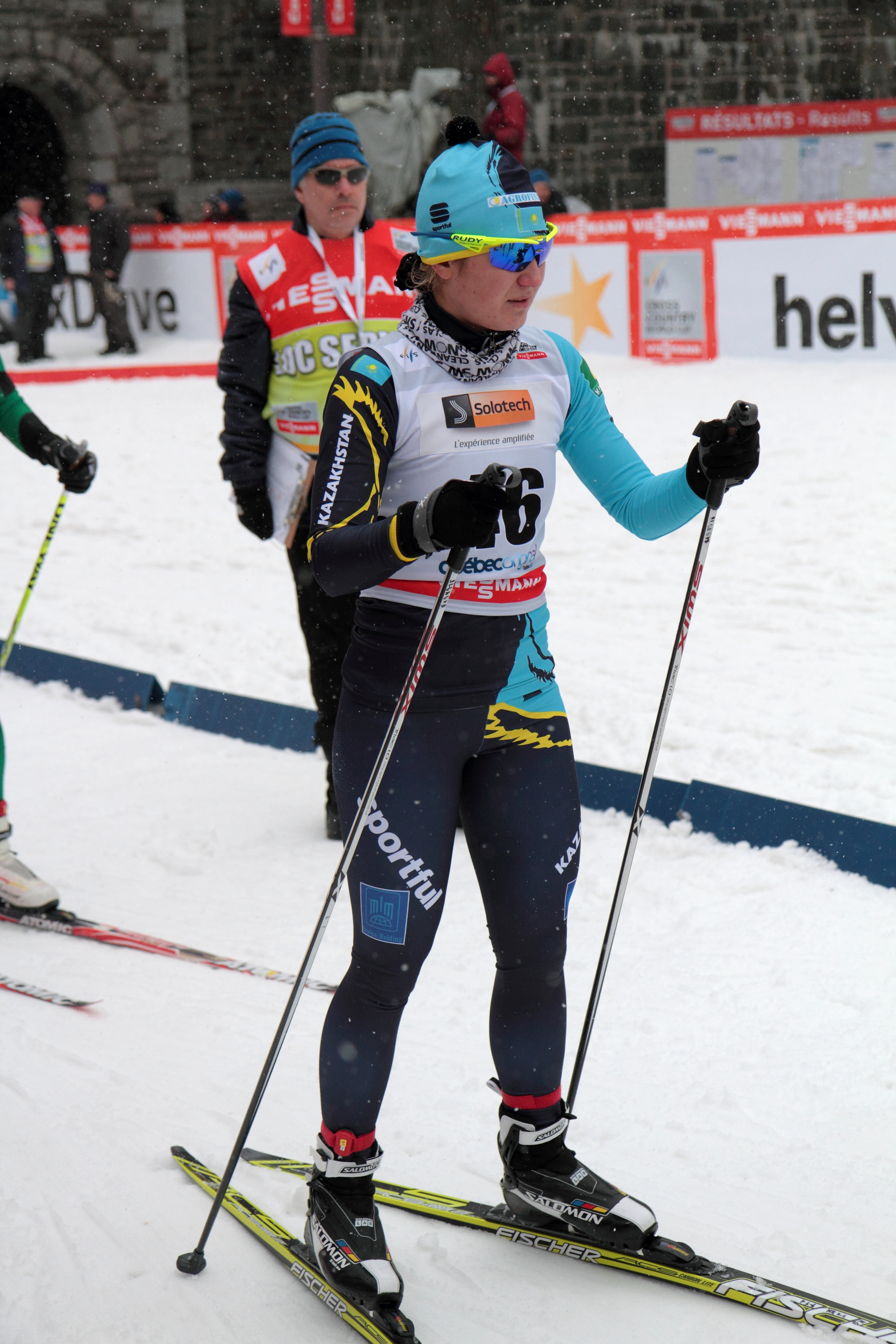
Anastassiya Slonova in 2012

Anastassiya Slonova (born 10 June 1991) is a Kazakhstani cross-country skier.

At the 2011 Asian Winter Games she was part of the winning Kazakhstani team on the 4 × 5 kilometre relay, together with Elena Kolomina, Oxana Yatskaya and Svetlana Malahova-Shishkina.

She competed at the FIS Nordic World Ski Championships 2011 in Oslo.
