= Michiyo =

- Gender: Both

Origin
- Origin: Japanese
- Meaning: Different meanings depending on the kanji used

Michiyo (written: 道世, 道代, 路代, 真世, 充代, 通世, 迪与, 美千代, 実千代, 美智代, 美知依, 美知代, 三千代 or みちよ in hiragana) is a unisex Japanese given name. Notable people with the name include:

- Michiyo Akaishi (赤石 路代; born 1959), Japanese manga artist
- Michiyo Aratama (新珠 三千代; 1930–2001), Japanese actress
- Michiyo Arito (有藤 通世; born 1946), Japanese baseball player
- Michiyo Azusa (梓みちよ; 1943–2020), Japanese singer and actress
- Michiyo Fujimaru (藤丸 真世; born 1979), Japanese synchronized swimmer
- Michiyo Fukaya (1953–1987), American poet and activist
- Michiyo Heike (平家 みちよ; born 1979), Japanese singer-songwriter
- Michiyo Inaoka (稲岡 美千代; born 1950), Japanese high jumper
- Michiyo Ishikake (石掛 美知代; born 1966), Japanese volleyball player
- Michiyo Kogure (木暮 実千代; 1918–1990), Japanese actress
- Michiyo Kikuta, Japanese manga artist and creator of Mamotte! Lollipop
- Michiyo Murase (村瀬 迪与), Japanese actress and voice actress
- Michiyo Nakajima (中嶋 美智代; born 1973), Japanese singer and voice actress
- Michiyo Ōkusu (大楠 道代; born 1946), Japanese actress
- Michiyo Takagi (高木 美智代; born 1952), Japanese politician
- Michiyo Taki (瀧 通世), Japanese footballer
- Michiyo Tsujimura (辻村 みちよ; 1888–1969), Japanese agricultural scientist and biochemist
- Michiyo Yagi (八木 美知依), Japanese musician
- Michiyo Yanagisawa (柳沢 三千代), Japanese voice actress
- Michiyo Yasuda (保田 道世; 1939–2016), Japanese animator
