= Michiko Kashiwabara =

Japanese cross-country skier (born 1991)

Medal record

Women's cross-country skiing

Representing Japan

Asian Games
Silver medal – second place	2011 Astana-Almaty	4×5 km relay

Michiko Kashiwabara (柏原 理子, Kashiwabara Michiko) (born March 14, 1991) is a Japanese cross-country skier who has competed since 2008. At the 2010 Winter Olympics in Vancouver, she finished ninth in the 4 x 5 km relay and 61st in the 10 km event.

Kashiwabara finished third in the 5 km qualification event at the FIS Nordic World Ski Championships 2009 in Liberec, Czech Republic. This allowed her to qualify for the 10 km event the following day though she did not start. At those same championships, she finished seventh in the 4 x 5 km relay and 45th in the individual sprint event.

Kashiwabara's best World Cup finish was 60th in the individual sprint at Valdidentro, Italy in February 2009.
