= Jan Šrail =

Czech cross country skier (born 1990)

Personal information
- Born: 18 December 1990 (age 35)

Sport
- Sport: Skiing
- Club: SK Nove Mesto n.M.

World Cup career
- Seasons: -
Medal record
Men's cross-country skiing
Representing Czech Republic

Jan Šrail (born 18 December 1990) is a Czech cross-country skier.

He represented the Czech Republic at the FIS Nordic World Ski Championships 2015 in Falun.
