= Michiro Sato =

Michiro Sato (佐藤 道朗, Satō Michirō; born January 1967 in Tokyo, Japan) is an avant-garde composer, singer, synthesizer player, and member of the rock band Factor.

== Career ==
Sato moved to London, England in 1995.

He has performed in the United Kingdom, Germany and Denmark. In London, he has performed at the Rock Garden, the Red Eye (on a bill with Ridiculous and the Kenny Process Team), the Bull and Gate, and Spitz. He toured Germany with the Frank Chickens, appearing at the clubs Tanzdiele and B-Movie.

After returning to Japan, he has performed in Asagaya, Suginami, Tokyo.

== Compositions ==
His composition works are Discommunication City, Surreal Man, and Factor
