= STAB Kyrgyzstan =

STAB (School of Theory and Activism) is an institute located in Bishkek, Kyrgyzstan, which focuses on research, expression, and activism. STAB was established in 2012 and provides a platform for discussion and expression of many issues facing the people of Kyrgyzstan primarily through art and literature. STAB focuses on several key issues including Postcolonialism, gender, and sexuality, and has partnered with other activist groups like Labrys, a Bishkek LGBT organization. STAB holds theory critical to the process of its work, and its members spend much time conceptualizing before completing their work.

== Workshop of Unalienating Protest ==
In a collaboration with the LGBT organization called Labrys, STAB helped create a 2-week project designed to create and use anti-homophobic slogans. The project ended with the creation of various materials like t-shirts and posters.

== Soviet Mosaics ==
On many of the walls of both public and residential buildings, Soviet mosaics exist as remnants of the Soviet Union in Bishkek. STAB categorized these mosaics as public domain, and claimed that they play a part of Bishkek's cultural heritage. STAB located and mapped all of these mosaics located in Bishkek, and now hosts tours of them.

=== Cosmos and Scientific Progress ===
In looking for these mosaics, STAB discovered a mosaic titled Cosmos and Scientific Progress which was located on the side of a building owned by a local karaoke club. The owners of this club called Zapoi had painted over the mosaic with a dark brown colour in order to cover the artwork. In an attempt to protect the mosaic and restore its original state, STAB filed a complaint and rallied the general public. STAB created an animated video that highlighted the issue to the general public in an effort to bring to light the situation. The result of the campaign was successful for STAB, and the owners of the club were fined and required to remove the paint off the mosaic.

== Botanical Garden Controversy ==
STAB was involved in protecting the Botanical Garden in Bishkek from developers who sought to build residences in its current location. In 2016, Parliament had planned to transfer the land from the Kyrgyz Academy of Sciences to the Ministry of Agriculture. STAB had seen this move as an attempt to privatize the land. In a response to this, STAB rallied the employees to protest the transfer of land.

== Programs ==
=== Fellows Program ===
STAB runs a fellowship program for Kyrgyz citizens every year, and the program made its debut in 2012. The content of these fellowships is comprehensive, and they include but are not limited to lectures, research and production spaces, and publication opportunities on their website. The fellowship students typically come from a wide variety of fields and interests, as a background in art is not required.

==== Critical Animation Workshop ====
STAB fellows have had opportunities to collaborate with each other in the past. The Critical Animation Workshop is focused around the creation of animation that highlights social issues. These issues range in topics, but typically focus on LGBT issues, namely Homophobia and gay rights within Kyrgyzstan.
