= Peter Smith Michie =

American soldier, Army engineer, and military educator

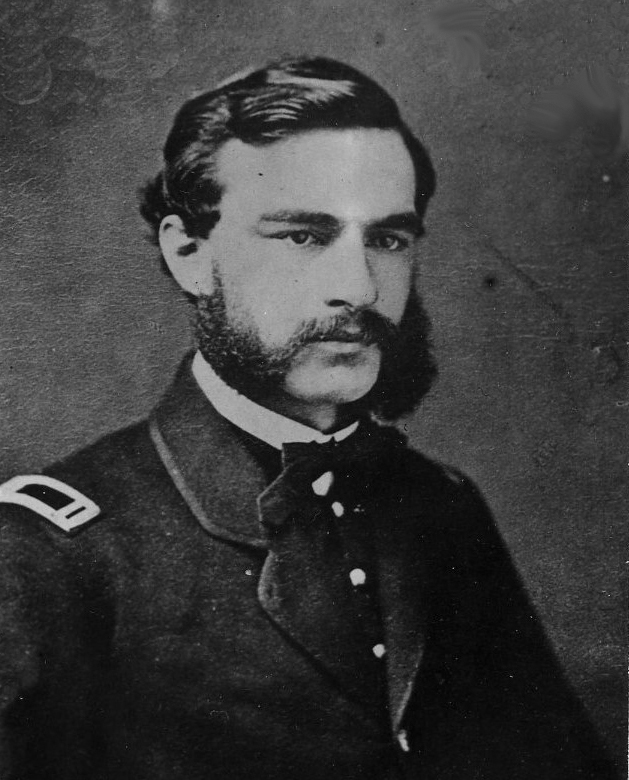
Peter Smith Michie

Peter Smith Michie (March 24, 1839 – February 16, 1901) was an American soldier, Army engineer, and military educator.

Michie's biography of Major General George B. McClellan, who lead the Union Army of the Potomac during the Peninsula and Maryland campaigns, including the Seven Days Battles and the Battle of Antietam, was published in 1901. In 2010, historian John C. Waugh referred to it as "the oldest and still one of the best McClellan biographies."

== Life and career ==
Michie was born in Brechin, Scotland and came to the United States in 1843; he was brought up in Cincinnati. He graduated second in the class of 1863 at the United States Military Academy (USMA) at West Point and entered the United States Army Corps of Engineers.

During the Civil War, Michie served in the campaign of 1864 against Richmond, Virginia; was chief engineer of General Benjamin Butler's Army of the James during the construction of the Dutch Gap Canal; and was at the head of all engineering operations of the left column at the Battle of Hatcher's Run during the Siege of Petersburg, and the subsequent pursuit of General Robert E. Lee's Army of Northern Virginia.

After the war, having attained the brevet rank of brigadier in 1865, he was for a year engaged in the government survey of the theatre of the war. From 1867 to 1869 he taught various courses at West Point; and was a member of a coastal fortification commission which visited Europe in 1870. For the last thirty years of his life he was professor of natural and experimental philosophy at the Academy. In addition, from 1871 to 1901 he was an overseer of the Thayer School of Civil Engineering at Dartmouth College.

He and his wife had two sons and a daughter. His son Dennis Michie also attended West Point, where he was the first coach and captain of the Army Black Knights football team, and was killed in the Spanish–American War.

== Death ==
Michie died in West Point, New York, at the age of 61, and was buried at the West Point Cemetery on February 18, 1901.

== Honors ==
Michie was a companion of the New York Commandery of the Military Order of the Loyal Legion of the United States. His son, William R. Michie, was an hereditary member of the order.

== Dates of rank ==
- Cadet, United States Military Academy: July 1, 1859
- First Lieutenant, Engineers: June 11, 1863
- Lieutenant Colonel, Assistant Inspector General: March 23 to June 6, 1865
- Brevet Brigadier General: January 1, 1865
- Captain, Engineers: October 23, 1865
- Professor, USMA: February 14, 1871

== Works ==
- Elements of Wave Motion Relating to Sound and Light (1882)
- The Life and Letters of Emory Upton (1885)
- Elements of Analytical Mechanics (1886)
- The Personnel of Sea-Coast Defense (1887)
- Hydrodynamics (1888)
- Practical Astronomy (1891)
- General McClellan (“Great Commanders Series,” New York, 1901)
