= Dennis Michie =

United States Army officer and football coach

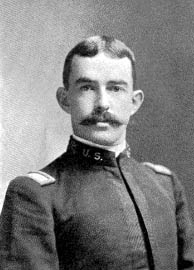

Biographical details
- Born: April 10, 1870; West Point, New York, U.S.
- Died: July 1, 1898 (aged 28); Santiago de Cuba, Cuba

Playing career
- 1890–1891: Army
- Position: Fullback

Coaching career (HC unless noted)
- 1890: Army
- 1892: Army

Head coaching record
- Overall: 3–2–1

Dennis Mahan Michie (April 10, 1870 – July 1, 1898) was an American college football player and coach and United States Army officer.

== Early life and education ==
Michie was born April 10, 1870, in West Point, New York. His father Peter Smith Michie was a West Point graduate who served in the Civil War before becoming a professor.

He attended Lawrenceville School, where he graduated in 1888.

== Career ==
=== Army football ===
In 1890, Michie served as the first head football coach and captain of the Army Black Knights football team at the United States Military Academy. He served as captain of the Army football team again in 1891 and again as head football coach in 1892. He compiled a record of 3–2–1 as head coach of the Army Black Knights.

=== U.S. Army service ===
On July 1, 1898, Captain Michie was killed while directing soldiers to a crossing point at the Bloody Bend of the San Juan River in the Spanish–American War.

== Legacy ==
Army's home football stadium, Michie Stadium, was dedicated in his honor when it opened in 1924.

== Head coaching record ==
Year	Team	Overall	Conference	Standing	Bowl/playoffs
Army Cadets (Independent) (1890)
1890	Army	0–1			
Army Cadets (Independent) (1892)
1892	Army	3–1–1			
Army:		3–2–1			
Total:		3–2–1			

== See also ==
- List of college football head coaches with non-consecutive tenure
