= Michiru =

- Gender: Unisex
- Language: Japanese

Origin
- Meaning: Different meanings depending on the kanji used
- Region of origin: Japan

Michiru (満, みちる, ミチル) is a Japanese given name. Notable people with the name include:

- Michiru Jo (城 みちる; born 1957), 1970s J-Pop artist
- Michiru Oshima (大島 ミチル; born 1961), Japanese composer
- Michiru Sasano (笹野 みちる; born 1967), Japanese pop singer and songwriter
- Michiru Satou (佐藤 ミチル; born 1980), Japanese voice actor
- Michiru Shimada (島田 満; 1959–2017), Japanese anime scriptwriter
- Michiru Yamane (山根 ミチル; born 1963), Japanese video game composer and pianist
- Michiru Yuimoto (結下 みちる), Japanese voice actress
- Monday Michiru (マンデイ 満ちる; born 1963), Japanese-American singer and songwriter
- Noroi Michiru (呪みちる), Japanese horror manga artist

== Fictional characters ==
- Michiru Aida, the protagonist of the Japanese TV drama Last Friends
- Michiru Matsushima, a character in the Japanese visual novel series The Fruit of Grisaia
- Michiru, a character in the Japanese visual novel series Air
- Sailor Neptune, a.k.a. Michiru Kaioh, one of the central characters in the Sailor Moon metaseries
- Michiru Nishikiori, a character in the Japanese anime and manga series Kamichama Karin
- Michiru Tsuki, a character in the third Naruto movie Naruto the Movie: Guardians of the Crescent Moon Kingdom
- Michiru Kagemori, the protagonist of the Japanese anime series BNA: Brand New Animal
- Michiru Kiryuu, a character in the Japanese anime series Pretty Cure Splash Star
- Michiru Otori, a character in the Revue Starlight franchise
- Michiru Hyodo, a character in the light novel series Saekano: How to Raise a Boring Girlfriend
- Michiru Sonoda, a character in the manga series Nozo × Kimi
- Michiru Onamida, a character in the video game series Phoenix Wright: Ace Attorney – Trials and Tribulations
