= Michie Stadium =

Outdoor football stadium at the U.S. Military Academy in West Point, New York

Blaik Field at Michie Stadium

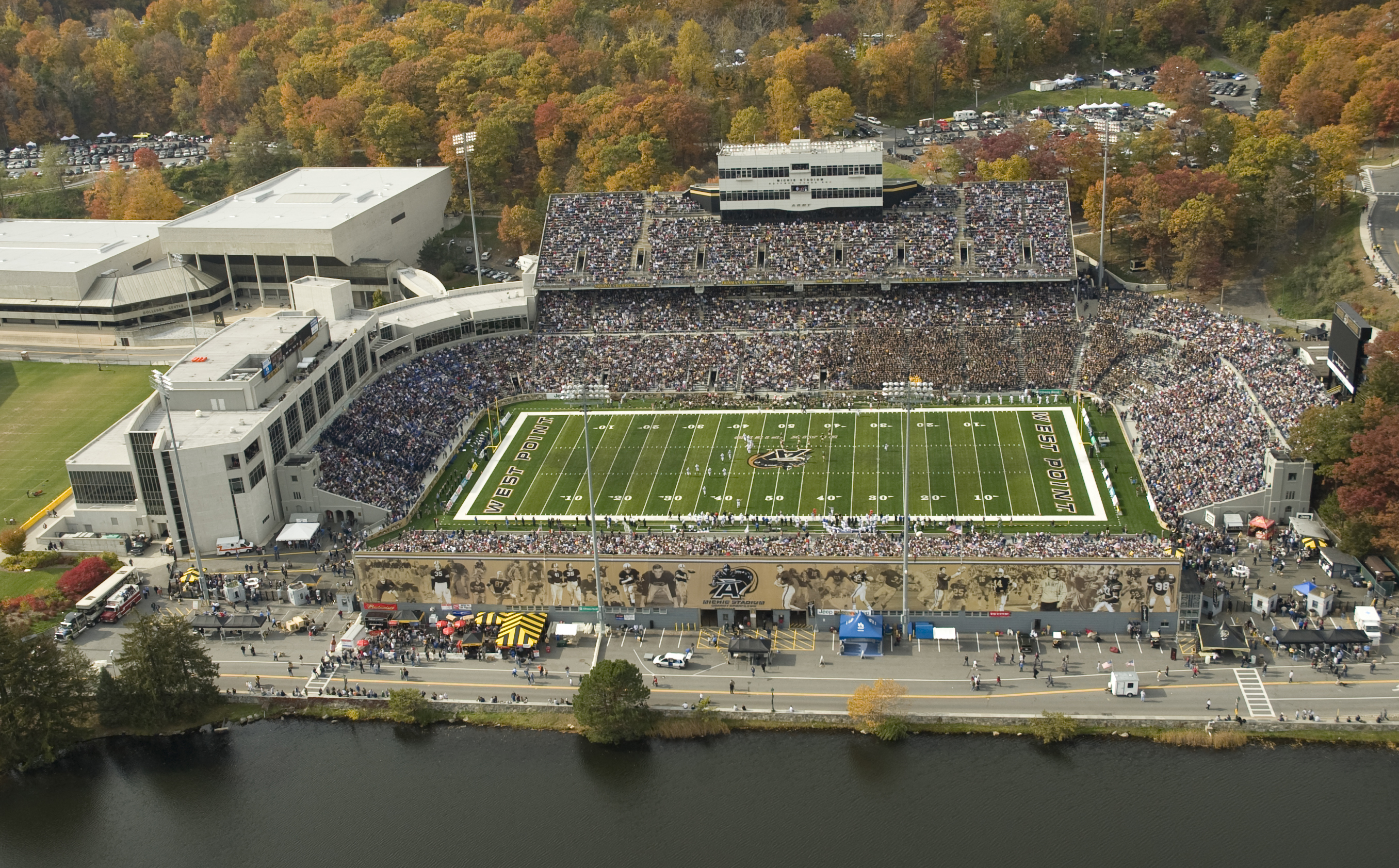
- Aerial view from east in November 2008

- Location within New York Location within the United States
- Full name: Blaik Field at Michie Stadium
- Address: 700 Mills Road
- Location: U.S. Military Academy; West Point, New York, U.S.
- Coordinates: 41°23′15″N 73°57′51″W
- Elevation: 335 feet (102 m) AMSL
- Owner: U.S. Military Academy
- Operator: U.S. Military Academy
- Capacity: 35,647 (2026–present); 30,000 (2024–2025); 38,000 (2023); 39,929 (c. 1997); 41,684 (1969–c. 1997); 29,425 (1962–1968); 16,000 (1924–1961)
- Surface: FieldTurf (2008–present); AstroPlay (2001–2007); AstroTurf (1977–2000); Grass (1924–1976)

Construction
- Groundbreaking: 1924
- Opened: 1924, 102 years ago
- Renovated: 2026: east grandstand (Michie Stadium Preservation Project)
- Expanded: 1962: east grandstand 1969: west upper deck 2003: press box
- Cost: $300,000

Tenant
- Army Black Knights (NCAA) (1924–present)

Website
- michiestadium.com

Michie Stadium /ˈmaɪki/ is an outdoor college football stadium on the campus of the U.S. Military Academy in West Point, New York. The home field for the Army Black Knights, it opened in 1924 and has a seating capacity of 30,000 for the 2024 and 2025 seasons.

The stadium sits at the upper portion of campus, directly west of Lusk Reservoir. The field is at an elevation of 335 feet (102 m) above sea level and runs in the traditional north–south configuration, with the press box above the west sideline. Due to the view offered by its location overlooking the Hudson River and the Neo-Gothic architecture of the campus below, it was rated as Sports Illustrated's #3 sports venue of the 20th century.

== Overview ==
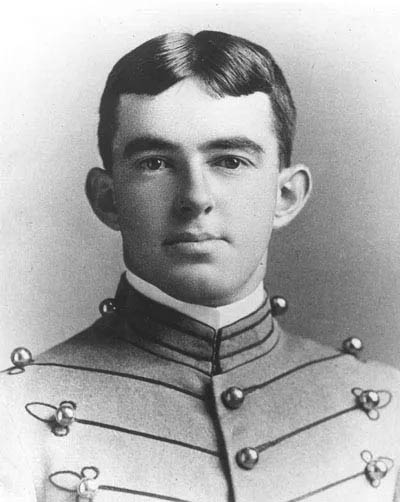
Michie Stadium is named for Dennis Michie, who was instrumental in starting the Army Black Knights football program in 1890.

Michie Stadium is dedicated to the memory of Dennis Michie (1870–1898), who was instrumental in starting the football program while a cadet at the Academy. A member of the Class of 1892, Michie organized, managed, and coached the first football team at West Point in 1890. Six years after graduation, he was killed in Cuba during the Spanish–American War. There have been several renovations since the stadium's first game in October 1924, when Army defeated Saint Louis, 17–0.

In 1999, the football field at Michie Stadium was named "Blaik Field" on September 25, in honor of Earl "Red" Blaik, West Point's all-time leader in wins during a 17-year tenure from 1941 to 1958. Blaik led Army to three consecutive national titles from 1944 to 1946.

Since 2008, the playing surface has been FieldTurf. This replaced AstroPlay, which had been used since 2001. The stadium's playing field was natural grass until AstroTurf was installed in 1977.

Michie Stadium first hosted the Army–Navy Game in 1943 during World War II, after it was played at Thompson Stadium at Annapolis the year before. Neither Army nor Navy had played at an on-campus facility since very early in the rivalry, since teams' home stadiums are not nearly large enough to accommodate the crowds and media that usually attend the rivalry games. Their rivalry game is normally played at a neutral site between the campuses on the East Coast, usually in Philadelphia in early December. In 2020, the Army–Navy Game was moved from Philadelphia to Michie Stadium due to state-imposed attendance limits on outdoor events as a result of the COVID-19 pandemic.

Construction on the Michie Stadium Preservation Project began on April 15, 2024. The project aimed to replace the eastern stands and all amenities, including walkways, bathrooms, and concessions. The stadium's capacity is capped at 30,000 during construction. The new eastern stands were scheduled to be ready just before the 2026 football season, and were intended to provide endzone to endzone seating for the Corps of Cadets while increasing premium hospitality seating.

== Attendance records ==
Highest attendance at Michie Stadium
Rank	Attendance	Date	Game result
1	42,765	Oct. 2, 1971	Army 22, Missouri 6
2	42,503	Oct. 20, 1973	Army 3, Notre Dame 62
3	42,399	Oct. 14, 1972	Army 0, Penn State 45
4	42,382	Sept. 23, 1972	Army 7, Nebraska 77
5	42,249	Nov. 4, 1972	Army 17, Air Force 14
6	42,139	Nov. 9, 1974	Army 17, Air Force 16
7	42,123	Oct. 27, 1973	Army 10, Holy Cross 17
8	42,085	Nov. 1, 1969	Army 6, Air Force 13
9	41,952	Oct. 23, 1971	Army 14, Virginia 9
10	41,903	Oct. 28, 1972	Army 7, Miami (FL) 28

== Gallery ==
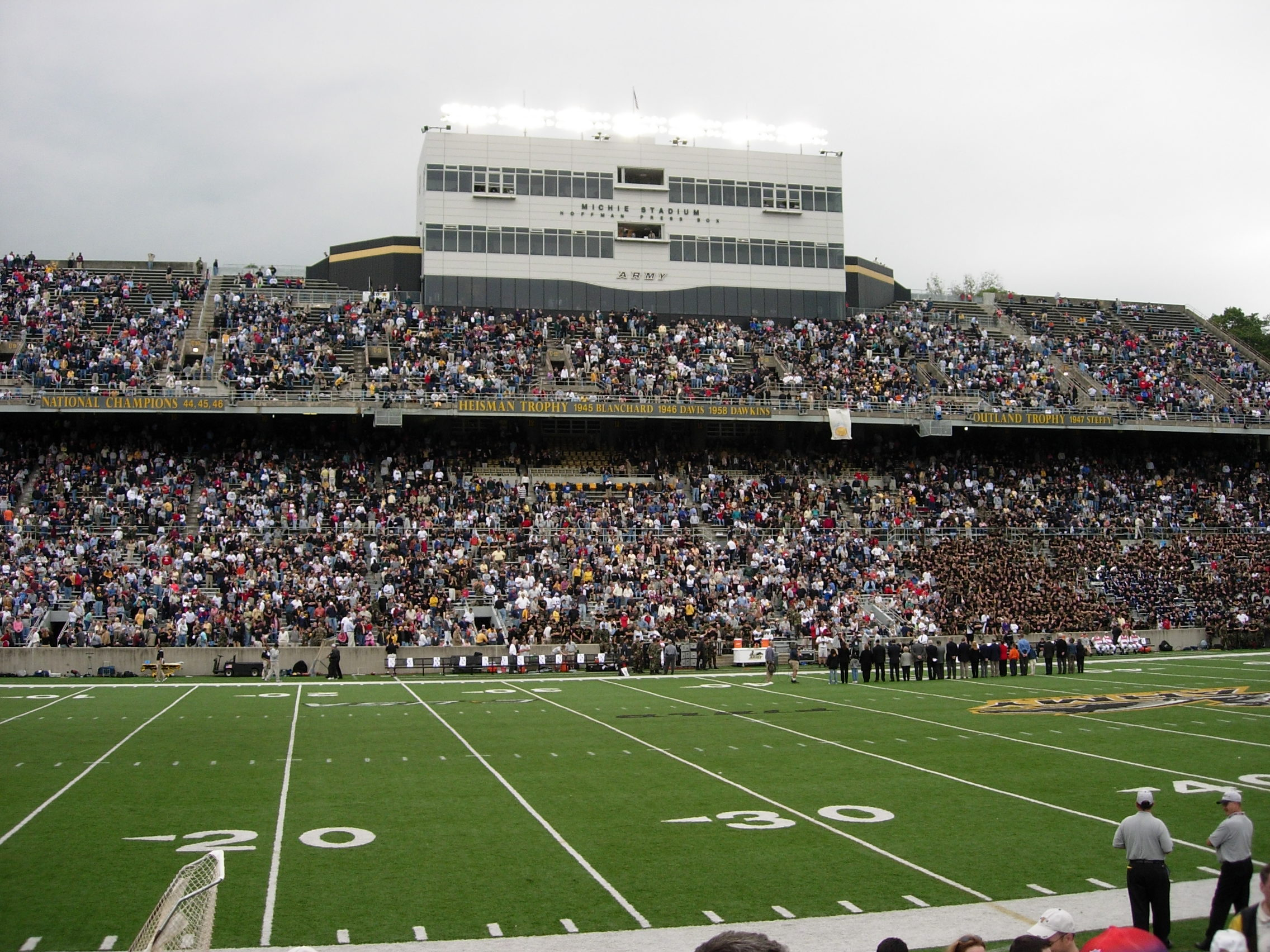
Press box, 2004

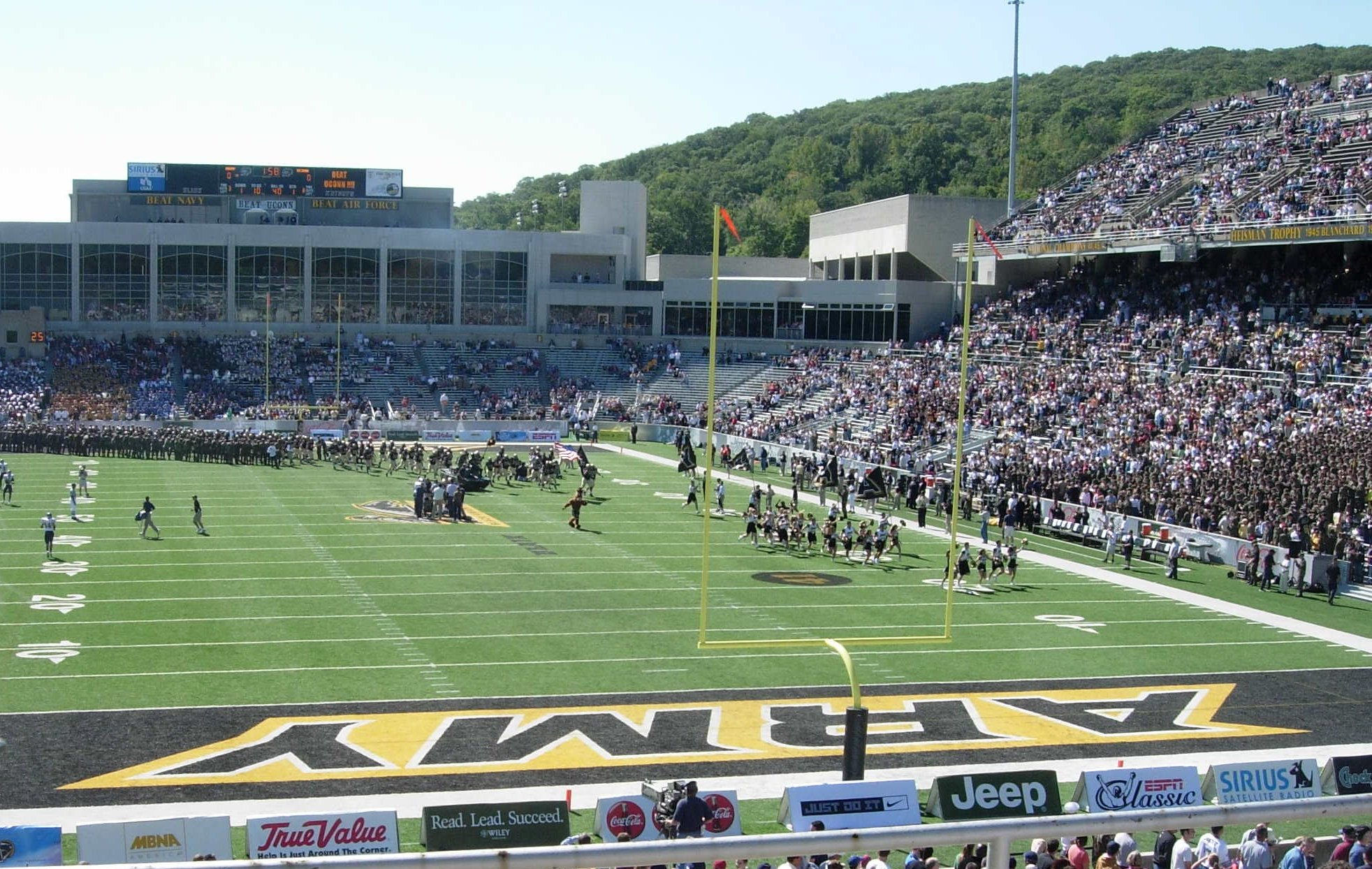
Football team entrance on game day, 2005

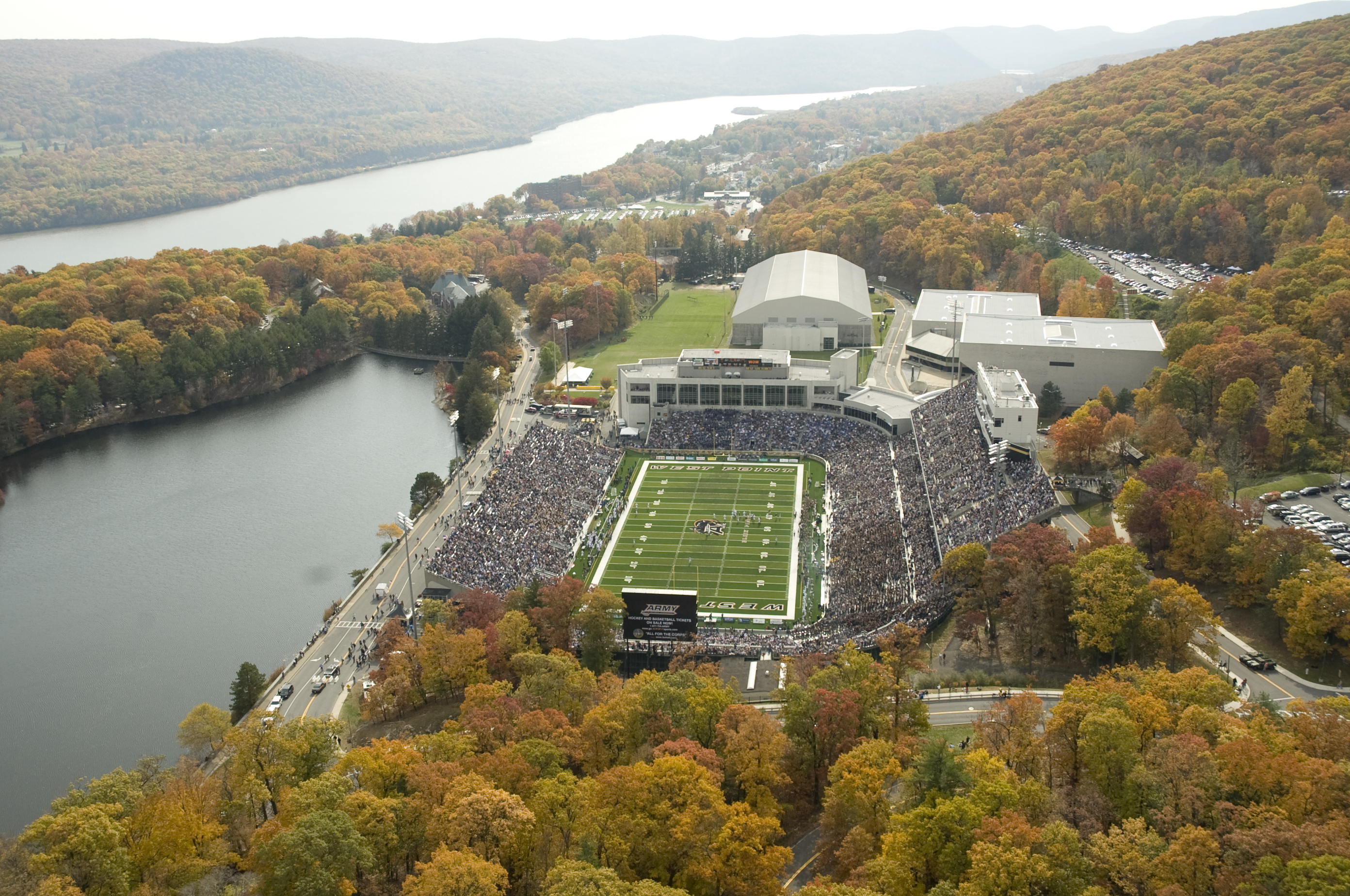
View looking south into the Hudson Valley, 2008

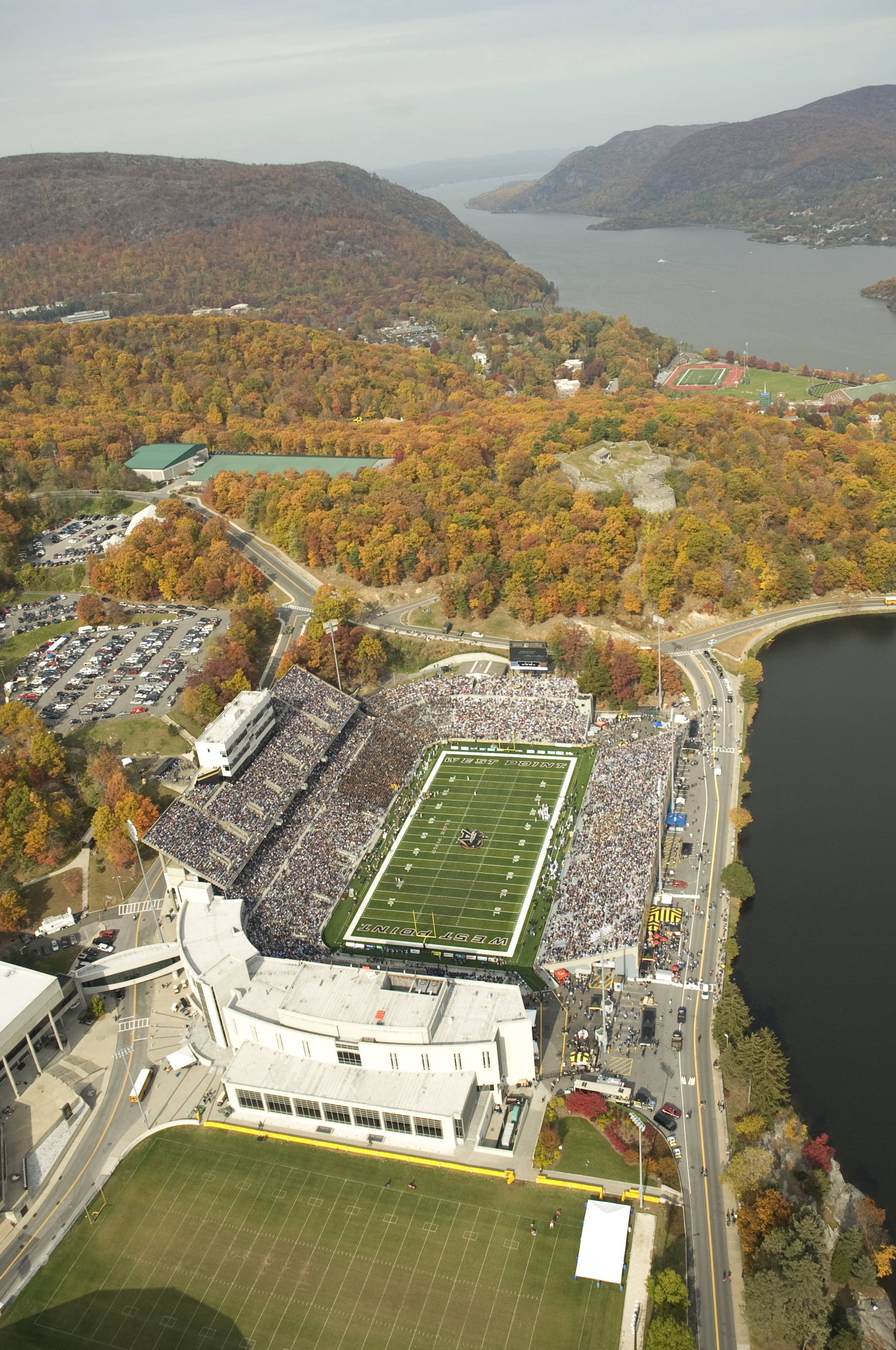
View looking north into the Hudson Valley, 2008

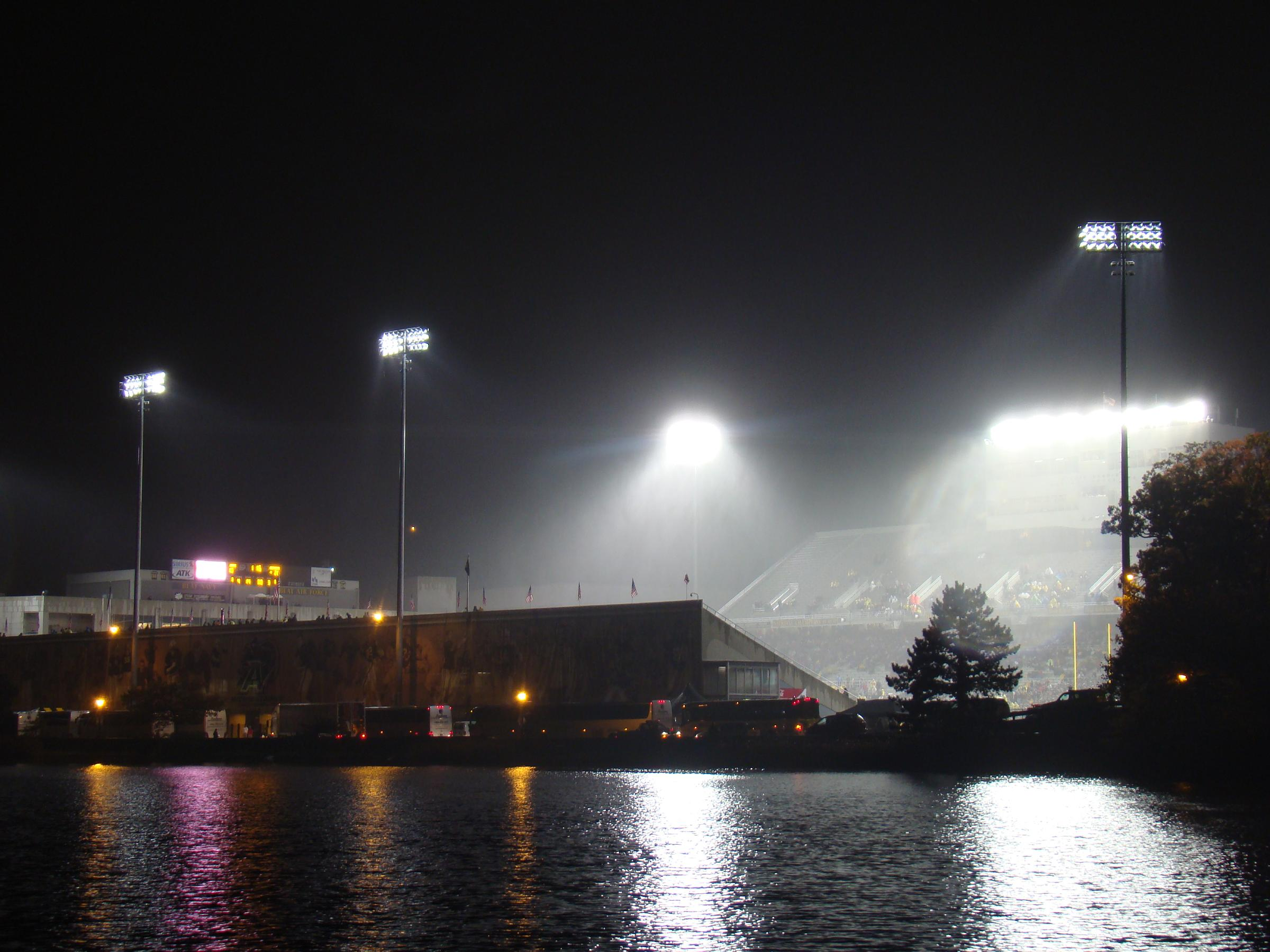
Michie Stadium from across the reservoir, 2011

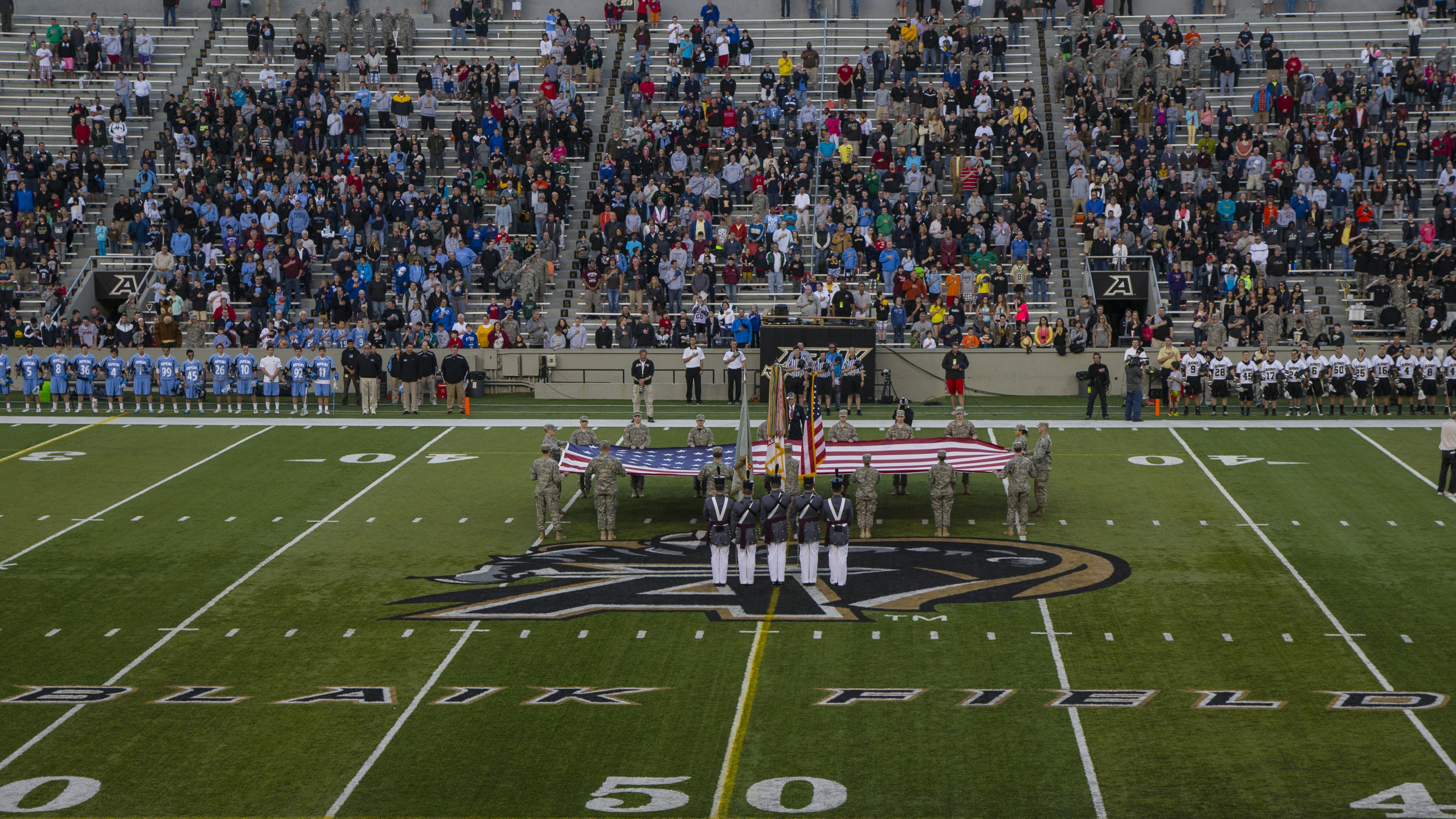
Ceremonies before a men's lacrosse game, 2013

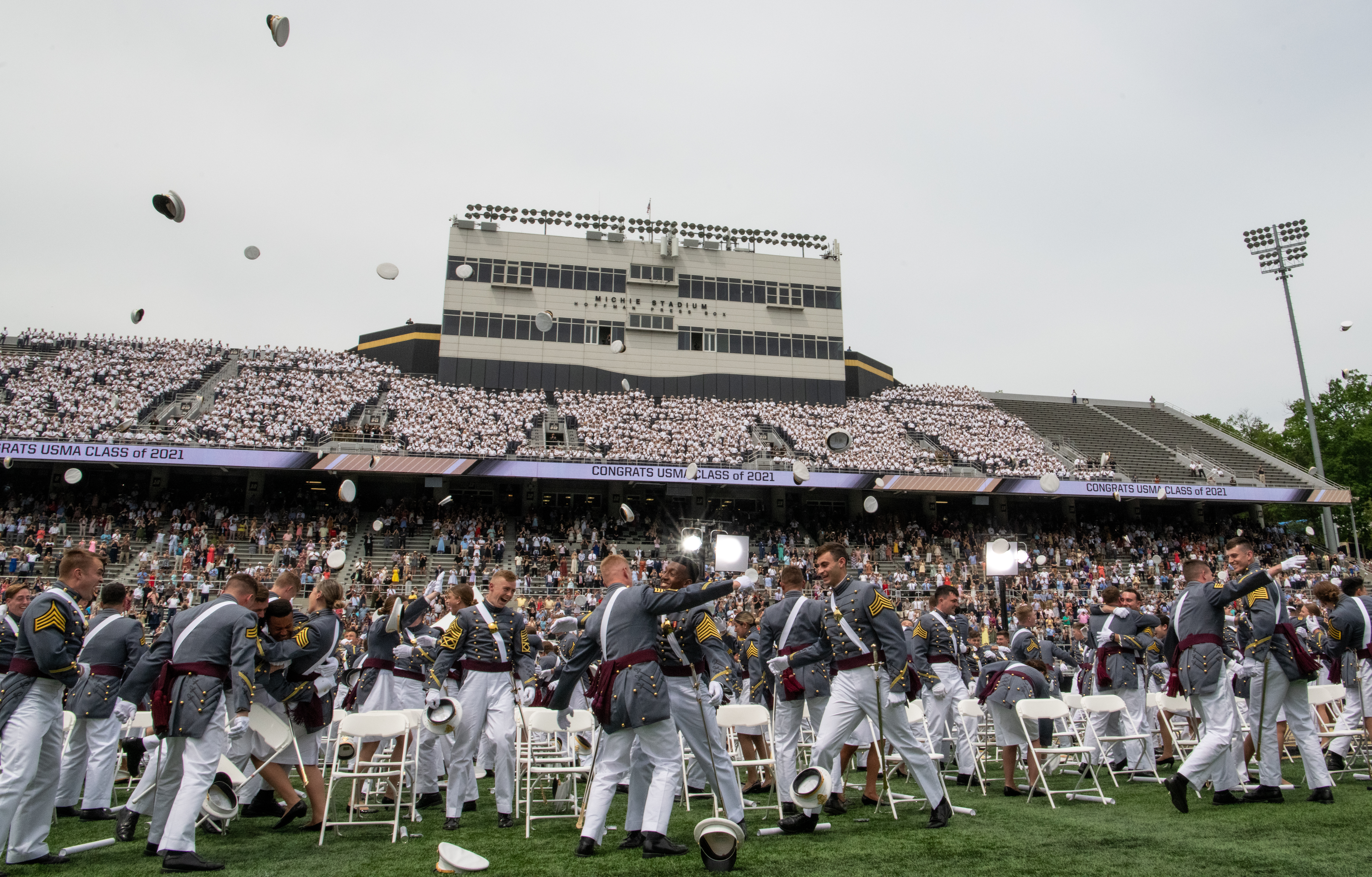
The USMA graduation ceremony, 2021

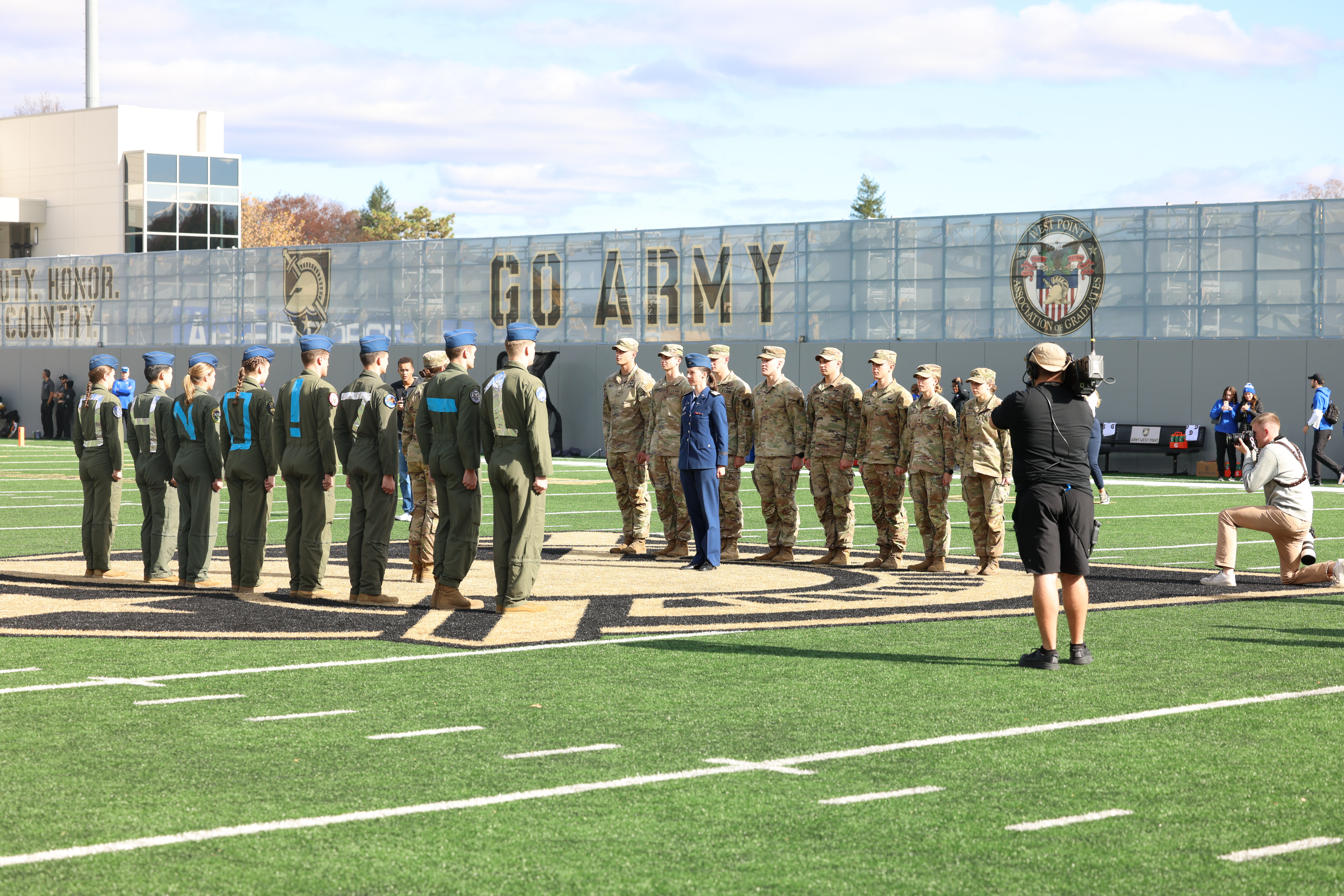
View of a temporary construction barrier in place of the removed eastern stands, 2024

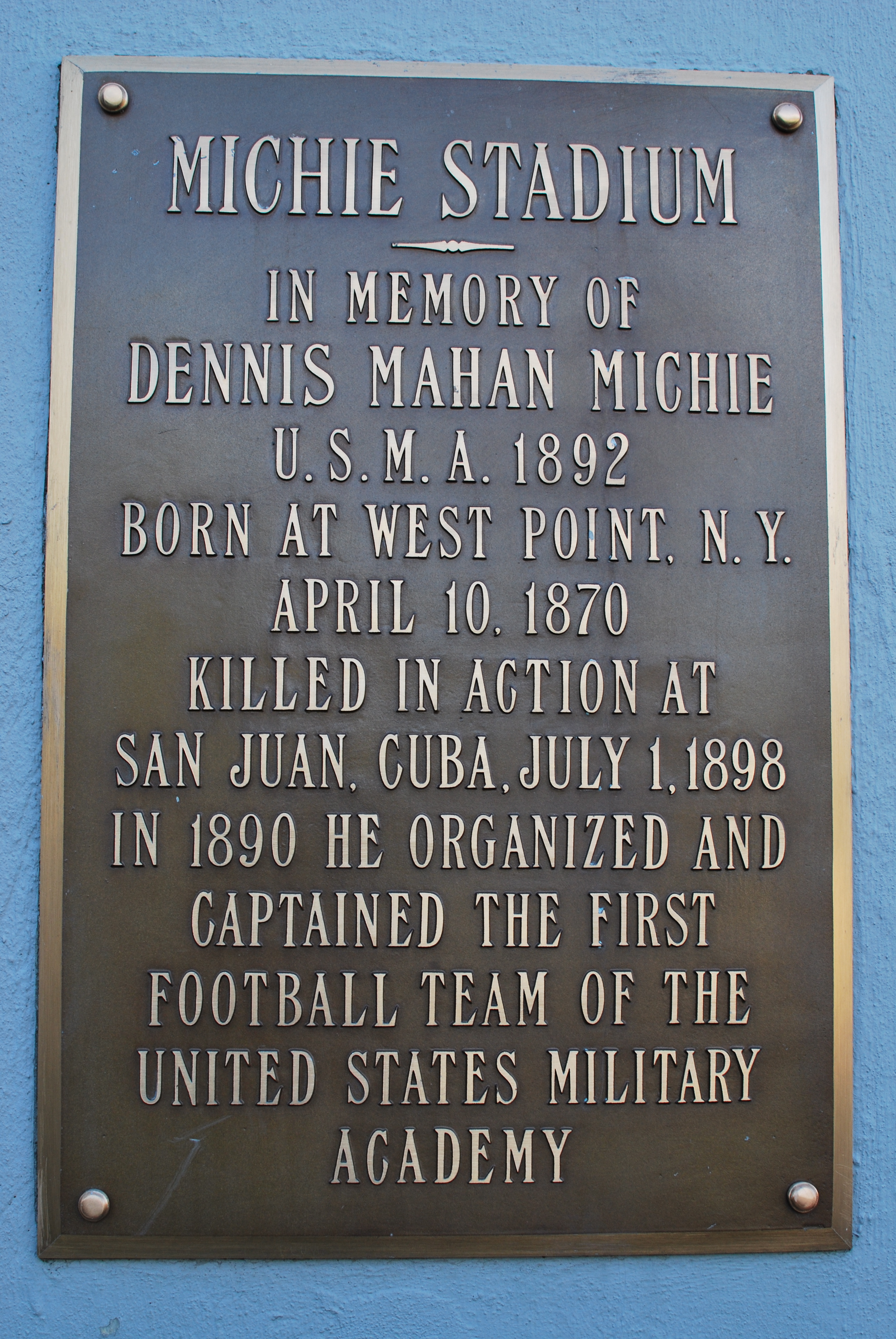
Plaque honoring Dennis Michie

== See also ==
- List of NCAA Division I FBS football stadiums
