= Michiya =

- Gender: Male

Origin
- Origin: Japanese
- Meaning: Different meanings depending on the kanji used

Michiya (written: 道哉 or 美智也) is a masculine Japanese given name. Notable people with the name include:

- Michiya Haruhata (春畑 道哉) (born 1966), Japanese guitarist
- Michiya Mihashi (三橋 美智也) (1930–1996), Japanese singer
