= Machiko =

- Pronunciation: MAH-Chee-koh
- Gender: Female

Origin
- Origin: Japanese
- Meaning: Multiple different meanings depending on the kanji used

Machiko (マチコ, まちこ)

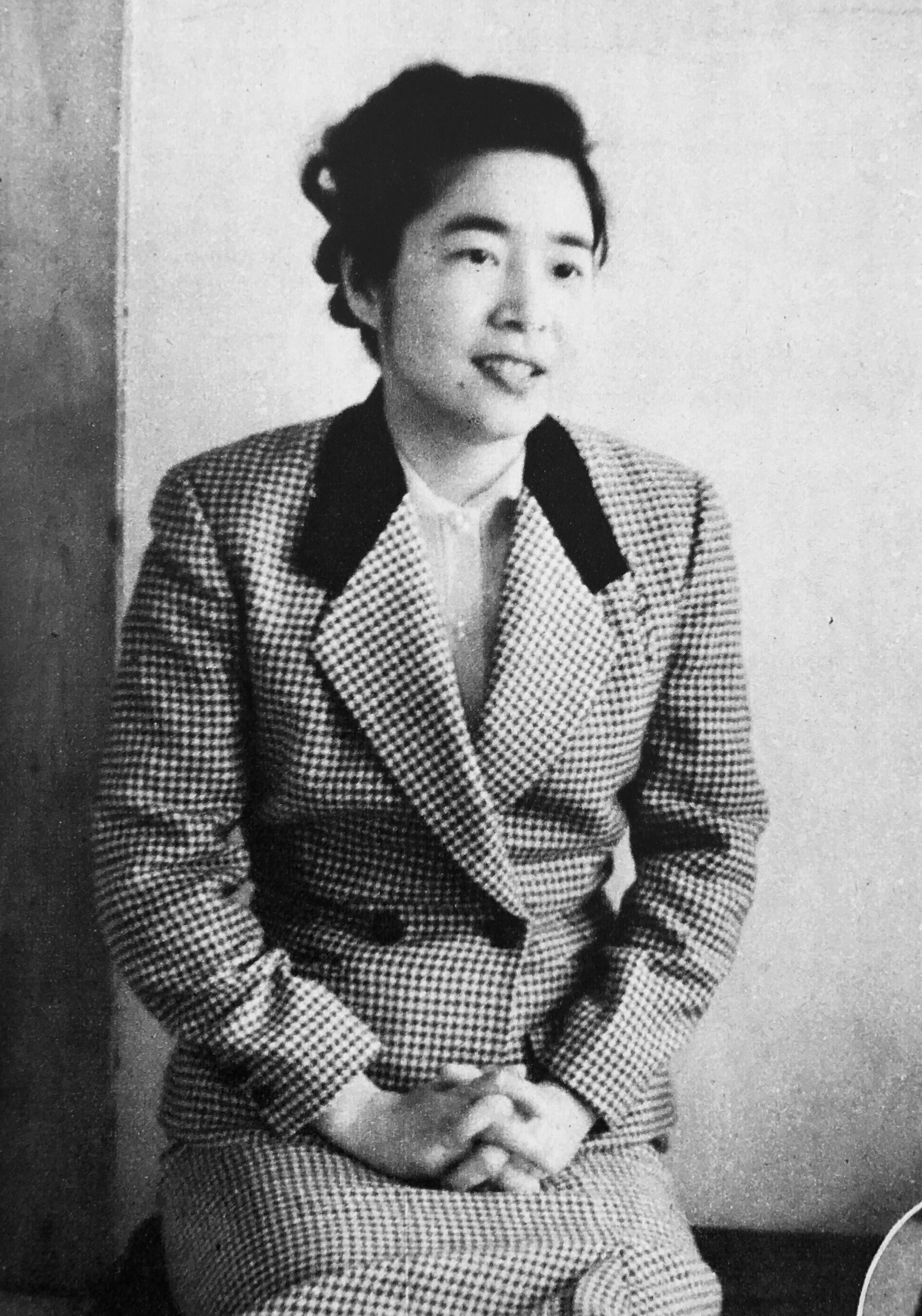
Machiko Hasegawa (長谷川 町子; 1920–1992)

is a feminine given name of Japanese origin. It can be written with the characters for know; wisdom (machi) and child (ko), although it can have a number of other different meanings depending on which kanji characters are used to write it. Machiko may also be written using the katakana or hiragana writing systems.

== Written forms ==
Forms in kanji can include:

- 真智子, "true, wisdom, child"
- 真千子, "true, thousand, child"
- 真知子, "true, knowledge, child"
- 町子, "town, child"
- 街子, "city, child"
- 待子, "wait, child"
- 茉茅子, "jasmine, miscanthus, child"
- 麻知子, "hemp, knowledge, child"

== People with the name ==
- Machiko Aizawa (相沢 マチ子), Japanese badminton player
- Machiko Hasegawa (長谷川 町子; 1920–1992), Japanese manga artist
- Machiko Kawana (川名 真知子; born 1983), Japanese voice actress
- Machiko Kyō (京 マチ子; born 1924), Japanese actress
- Machiko Nakanishi (中西 真知子; born 1976), Japanese triathlete
- Ōgimachi Machiko (正親町町子; 1675 - 1724) a Japanese noble lady, scholar and memoirist, member of the Ōgimachi family of court nobles during the Edo period.
- Machiko Ono (尾野 真千子; born 1981), Japanese actress
- Machiko Saitō (齊藤 真知子; born 1992), better known by her stage name Machico, Japanese singer and voice actress
- Machiko Satonaka (里中 満智子; born 1948), Japanese manga artist
- Machiko Soga (曽我 町子; 1938–2006), Japanese actress and voice actress
- Machiko Tezuka (手束 真知子; born 1986), Japanese idol and singer
- Machiko Toyoshima (豊嶋 真千子; born 1971), Japanese manga artist
- Machiko Washio (鷲尾 真知子; born 1949), Japanese actress and voice actress
- Machiko Yamada (山田 満知子; born 1943), Japanese figure skater and coach

== Fictional characters ==
- Machiko Mai (マチコ先生), main character of the Miss Machiko manga and anime series
- Machiko Noguchi (野口真千子), protagonist of the Aliens vs. Predator novel series

== See also ==
- Machiko Raheem (මචිකෝ රහීම්, born 1996), Sri Lankan swimmer
