= Michio =

- Gender: Male

Origin
- Origin: Japanese
- Meaning: Different meanings depending on the kanji used

Michio (written: 道夫, 道雄, 道郎, 通夫 or 三知男) is a masculine Japanese given name. Notable people with the name include:

- Michio Ariyoshi (有吉 道夫; 1935–2022), Japanese shogi player
- Michio Itō (伊藤 道郎; 1892–1961), Japanese dancer and choreographer
- Michio Kaku (born 1947), American theoretical physicist, futurist and writer
- Michio Kitazume (北爪 道夫; born 1948), Japanese classical composer and conductor
- Michio Kubota (久保田 三知男; born 1949), Japanese Nordic combined skier
- Michio Mamiya (1929–2024), Japanese composer, pianist, harpsichordist, and conductor of baroque and classical music
- Michio Miyagi (宮城 道雄; 1894–1956), Japanese musician
- Michio Morishima (森嶋 通夫; 1923–2004), Japanese economist and emeritus professor of LSE
- Michio Suzuki (inventor) (鈴木 道雄; 1887–1982), Japanese businessman, inventor and founder of the Suzuki Motor Corporation
- Michio Suzuki (mathematician) (鈴木 通夫; 1926–1998), Japanese mathematician
- Michio Takahashi (高橋 道雄; born 1960), Japanese shogi player

== Fictional characters ==
- Michio Suzuki, a main character from manga Ultra B
- Michio Yuki, the antagonist of manga series MW
- Michio Pa, a character from the book series The Expanse

== See also ==
- Mishio (disambiguation)
