= Michihiko =

- Gender: Male

Origin
- Origin: Japanese
- Meaning: Different meanings depending on the kanji used

(Michihiko (written: 道彦 or 美知彦) is a masculine Japanese given name. Notable people with the name include:

- Michihiko Hachiya (蜂谷 道彦) (1903–1980), Japanese diarist
- Michihiko Kano (鹿野 道彦) (born 1942), Japanese politician
- Michihiko Ohta (太田 美知彦) (born 1964), Japanese singer and composer
- Michihiko Watase (渡瀬 道彦) (born 1941), japanese actor
