= Michiko Katagiri =

Japanese Paralympic swimmer

Medal record

Women's swimming

Representing Japan

Paralympic Games
Bronze medal – third place	1992 Barcelona	100 metre breaststroke - SB3

Michiko Katagiri (片桐 美智子, Katagiri Michiko) is a paralympic swimmer from Japan competing mainly in category SB3 events.

Michiko competed at the 1992 Summer Paralympics in the 100m breaststroke for SB3 class athletes and won the bronze medal.
