= Marion Buillet =

French cross-country skier (born 1990)

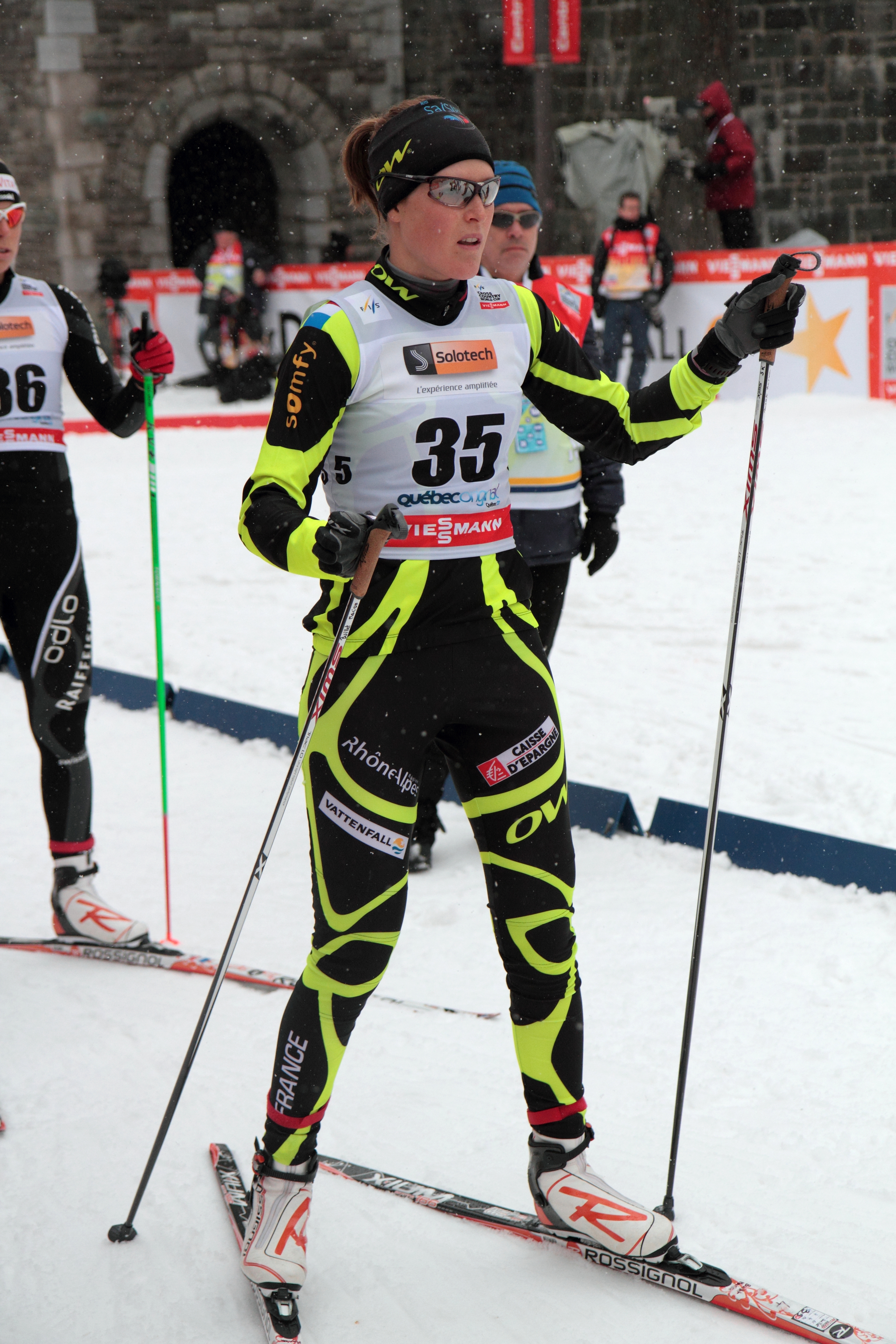
- Buillet in 2012

Personal information
- Nationality: France
- Born: August 16, 1990 (age 35) Saint-Martin-d'Hères, France

Sport
- Sport: Skiing

World Cup career
- Seasons: 6 – (2011–2015, 2017)
- Indiv. starts: 19
- Indiv. podiums: 0
- Team starts: 5
- Team podiums: 0
- Overall titles: 0 – (81st in 2012)
- Discipline titles: 0
Medal record
Women's cross-country skiing
Representing France
Winter Universiade
Bronze medal – third place	2015 Strsbské Pleso	3 × 5 km relay

Marion Buillet (born August 16, 1990 in Saint-Martin-d'Hères) is a French cross-country skier.

Buillet competed at the 2014 Winter Olympics for France. She placed 36th in the qualifying round in the sprint, failing to advance to the knockout stages.

Buillet made her World Cup debut in December 2010. As of April 2014, her best finish is 10th, in a freestyle team sprint race at Milan in 2011–12. Her best individual finish is 11th, in a freestyle sprint race at Szklarska Poreba in 2013–14. Her best World Cup overall finish is 81st, in 2011-12. Her best finish in a discipline is 53rd, in the sprint in 2013-14.

== Cross-country skiing results ==
All results are sourced from the International Ski Federation (FIS).

=== Olympic Games ===
Year	Age	10 km individual	15 km skiathlon	30 km mass start	Sprint	4 × 5 km relay	Team sprint
2014	23	—	—	—	35	—	—

=== World Cup ===
Season standings
Season	Age	Discipline standings			Ski Tour standings		
Season	Age	Overall	Distance	Sprint	Nordic Opening	Tour de Ski	World Cup Final
2011	20	NC	NC	—	—	—	—
2012	21	81	—	57	—	—	—
2013	22	118	NC	76	—	—	—
2014	23	82	—	53	—	—	—
2015	24	NC	—	NC	DNF	—	—N/a
2017	26	NC	NC	NC	—	—	—
