= Fiona Hughes =

English cross-country skier (born 1990)

Personal information
- Full name: Fiona-Elizabeth Hughes
- Born: 5 March 1990 (age 36) Huddersfield, England
- Height: 1.59 m (5 ft 3 in)

Sport
- Sport: Skiing
- Club: Yorkshire Dales Cross Country Ski Club, England

World Cup career
- Seasons: 2009 World Championships; 2010 Olympic Winter Games
- Updated on 8 AUGUST 2014

Fiona-Elizabeth Hughes (born 5 March 1990) is an English cross-country skier from Huddersfield. She has competed in the World Cup since February 2010 and represented Great Britain at the 2009 World Championships and the 2010 Winter Olympics. Hughes is the only female British cross-country skier competing at the 2010 Olympics.

She finished 68th in the 10 km event at the 2010 Games while at the 2009 championships, Hughes finished 14th in the team sprint, 68th in the 10 km, 85th in the individual sprint, and was lapped in the 15 km mixed pursuit events. Her best World Cup finish was 60th in the individual sprint event at Canada in 2010.

She's currently reading Engineering at Queens' College, Cambridge.
