= Martyna Galewicz =

Polish cross-country skier

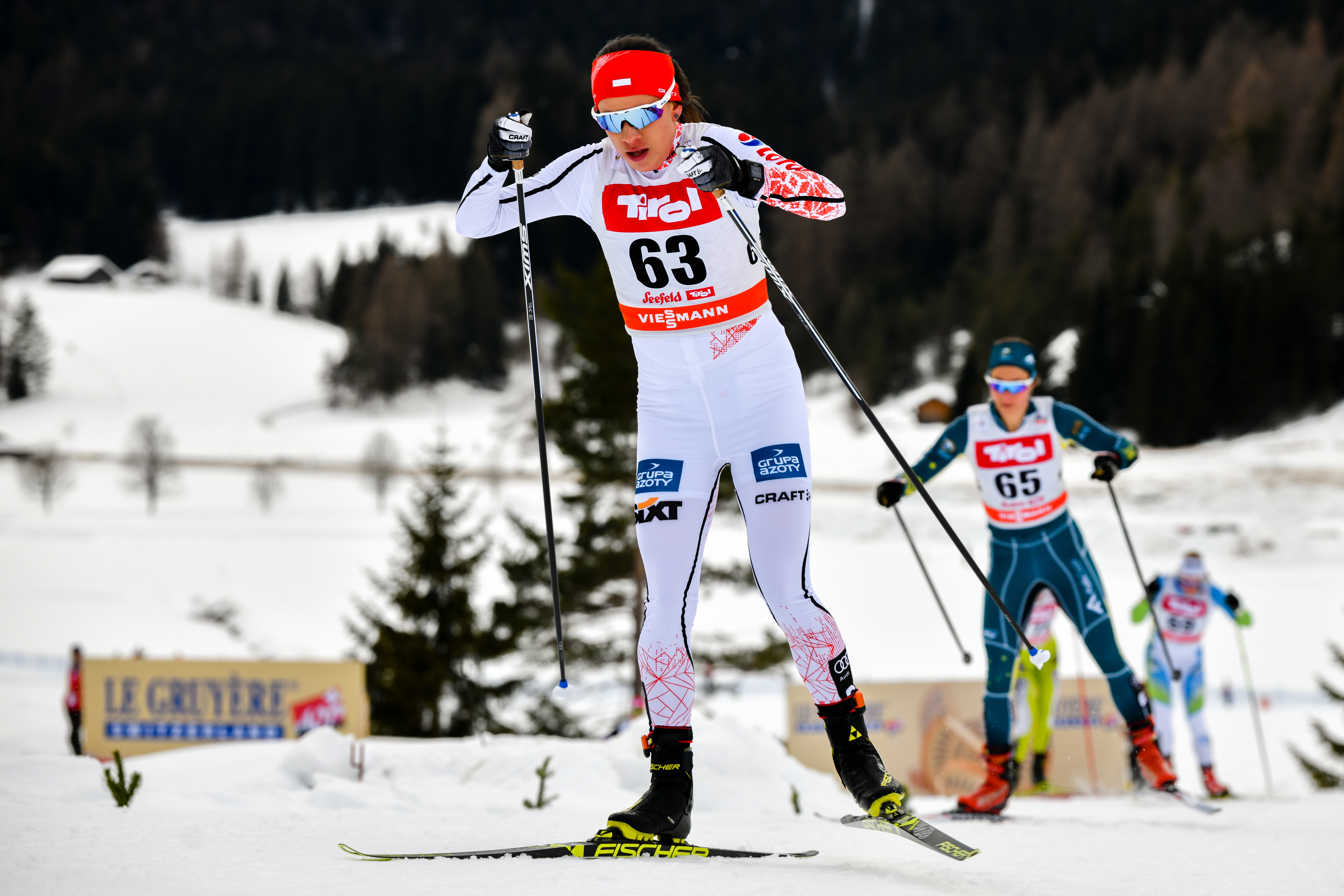
- Martyna Galewicz in 2018

Personal information
- Nationality: Poland
- Born: 29 January 1989 (age 37) Zakopane, Poland

Sport
- Sport: Skiing
- Club: AZS AWF Katowice

World Cup career
- Seasons: 6 – (2009, 2011, 2014, 2016–2018)
- Indiv. starts: 25
- Indiv. podiums: 0
- Team starts: 1
- Team podiums: 0
- Overall titles: 0
- Discipline titles: 0

Martyna Galewicz (born 29 January 1989) is a Polish cross-country skier. She competed in the women's 15 kilometre skiathlon at the 2018 Winter Olympics.

== Cross-country skiing results ==
All results are sourced from the International Ski Federation (FIS).

=== Olympic Games ===
Year	Age	10 km individual	15 km skiathlon	30 km mass start	Sprint	4 × 5 km relay	Team sprint
2018	29	64	41	—	—	10	—

=== World Championships ===
Year	Age	10 km individual	15 km skiathlon	30 km mass start	Sprint	4 × 5 km relay	Team sprint
2017	28	53	45	—	—	8	—

=== World Cup ===
==== Season standings ====
Season	Age	Discipline standings			Ski Tour standings			
Season	Age	Overall	Distance	Sprint	Nordic Opening	Tour de Ski	World Cup Final	Ski Tour Canada
2009	20	NC	NC	NC	—N/a	—	—	—N/a
2011	22	NC	NC	NC	63	—	—	—N/a
2014	25	NC	NC	NC	—	—	—	—N/a
2016	27	NC	NC	—	—	—	—N/a	—
2017	28	NC	NC	NC	DNF	—	—	—N/a
2018	29	NC	NC	—	—	—	—	—N/a
