= Oksana Shatalova =

Kazakh Artist

Oksana Shatalova (born 1972, Rudny, Kazakhstan) is a visual artist, art critic, writer and curator from Kazakhstan.

Shatalova is known for her photographic, video, and installation work which provides feminist perspectives around the Soviet legacy and life in Central Asia. Her work has been exhibited worldwide, including at the 53rd Venice Biennale (2009), the first Biennale in Thessaloniki (2007), and the second Moscow Biennale (2007). Shatalova has been writing extensively on Central Asian Art, and was a co-curator of the Central Asian Pavilion at Venice Biennale (2011) as well as co-Artistic Director of School of Theory and Activism (STAB).

== Selected exhibitions ==
As an artist, Shatalova's artworks often explores themes on individual experiences of the Soviet past, local mythology and folk customs, body politics and feminism, and critique of social and economic inequalities. Shatalova has exhibited worldwide in cities like Cologne, Toronto, Los Angeles, and Naples, among others. For example, in the exhibition "East of Nowhere" (2009) held at Foundation 107, Turin, Shatalova showcased a series of photographic work titled Red Flag (2008), which sees herself in a red dress holding a red flag filled with white dots.

In the 2nd Bishkek International Exhibition "In the Shadow of 'Heroes'", Shatalova and Girik presented a series of photographic works Ofelia. Gestures., showing a woman making iconic gestures of different faiths such as Buddhist and Hindu Moudrs, and that of Christian saints.

In the 3rd Bishkek Exhibition of Contemporary Art "Zone of Risk - Transition", they collaborated again to create the video work Wedding Dances, featuring seven modern styled Russian weddings in the town of Rudny to represent customs and rituals within a patriarchal and conservative culture of the so-called Third World.

She also participated in festivals such as the 53rd Venice Biennale (2009), the 2nd Moscow Biennale (2007), the 1st Annual Women's International Video Festival (2006) in Tucson, Cologne Online Film Festival (2006), the 2006 Cabbagetown Short Film & Video Festival in Toronto, LA Freewaves' 10th Biennial Festival of New Media Arts Too Much Freedom? in Los Angeles (2006), SWGC Art Gallery Contemporary Film & Video Festival in Newfoundland and Labrador (2006), VAD International Festival of Video and Digital Arts of Girona (2005).

Other exhibitions she participated in include "Intervals and Borders" (2008) in Ohio, "Non-Eroticism" (2007) in Almaty, "Selfportrait - a show for Bethlehem" (2006) in Bethlehem, and "Capturing Utopia" (2005) in Santa Fe.

== Curatorial projects and other initiatives ==
Since 2007, Shatalova has collaborated with curator Georgy Mamedov on various artistic projects. Their research interests include the cultural history and theory, contemporary philosophy, cultural politics, gender and queer theories.

In 2011, they became part of the curatorial team of the Central Asian Pavilion in the Venice Biennale, which presented the exhibition project "Lingua Franca". They are also the authors of Queer-communism as Ethics, a book exploring the radical imagination of a queer future alongside the legacy of Soviet communism, which was published in 2016 by Free Marxist Press.

In 2012, Shatalova and Mamedov founded the School of Theory and Activism (STAB) in Bishkek, Kyrgyzstan, an artistic and research initiative that tackles issues on queer and communist history in Central Asia. Their work was informed by the principles of Soviet avant-garde art and activism that seek to create timely response to contemporary issues. Since its establishment, STAB has run animation workshops which addresses critical topics in Kyrgyz Republic, such as the dominance of the Russian language in Central Asia, urban development, or the passing of a bill banning "homosexual propaganda".

From 1997 to 2001, Shatalova issued and edited the literary and art magazine Pigmalion. She was awarded the U.S. Artslink International Fellowship in 2008 and the Back Apartment Residency in 2015. She was also the recipient of the Prince Claus Award in 2015 for her works around gender inequality and also "generously, mentoring, curating and promoting Central Asian artists."

Her other curatorial projects included STIILS-Enthusiasm: To be or not to be for Koldo Art Gallery in Bishkek, Kyrgyzstan, 2010 (co-curated with Boris Chukhovich), a photo project in which more than 80 artists participated from five countries in the region and Lingua Franca.

== Selected writings and publications ==
Shatalova has published writings collaboratively with other curators or writers on Central Asian art on topics related to queer and women identities, Soviet history and communism.

In 2016, Shatalova and Georgy Mamedov co-wrote the book Queer Communism is an Ethics.

They also co-wrote the chapter "Architecture, Outer Space, Sex: The Kollontai Commune in 1970s Frunze" in the book Queer(ing) Russian Art in 2023, which discussed early Soviet revolutionary ideas of liberation of sexuality in Alexandra Kollontai's writings in relation to non-heteronormative sexuality and gender identity within the semi-fictional Frunze queer commune of the 1970s.

As the co-curators of the Central Asian Pavilion in the Venice Biennale in 2011, they co-wrote the catalogue Lingua Franca: Central Asia Pavilion, which discusses the exhibition project that set out to "test art for universality", the ability to act as a kind of lingua franca, through the works of artists from Kazakhstan, Kyrgyzstan, Tajikistan, and Uzbekistan.

In 2017, they published the essay "Against Simple Answers: The Queer-Communist Theory of Evald Ilyenkov and Alexander Suvorov" in Ways of Seeing: Russian Colonialisms, which sought to examine queer-theories of today through the lens of Ilyenkov and Alexander Suvorov's radical theory and praxis so as to combat the politics of identity with the tools of social determinism. The essay was translated by Giuliano Vivaldi from Russian into English.

Shatalova is also the co-author of Muzykstan. Media Generation of Contemporary Artists From Central Asia together with Sorokina Yuliya, Джапаров Улан, and Misiano Viktor. The book was published in 2007 on the occasion of Central Asia's participation in the 52nd Venice Biennale. Their project was based on the local music leitmotiv which served as a reflection of the social and cultural background of Central Asia.

She was also a co-author of "New nomads" in In the Shadow of 'Heroes': 2nd Bishkek International Exhibition of Contemporary Art with Alia Girik.
