= Kateřina Razýmová =

Czech cross-country skier

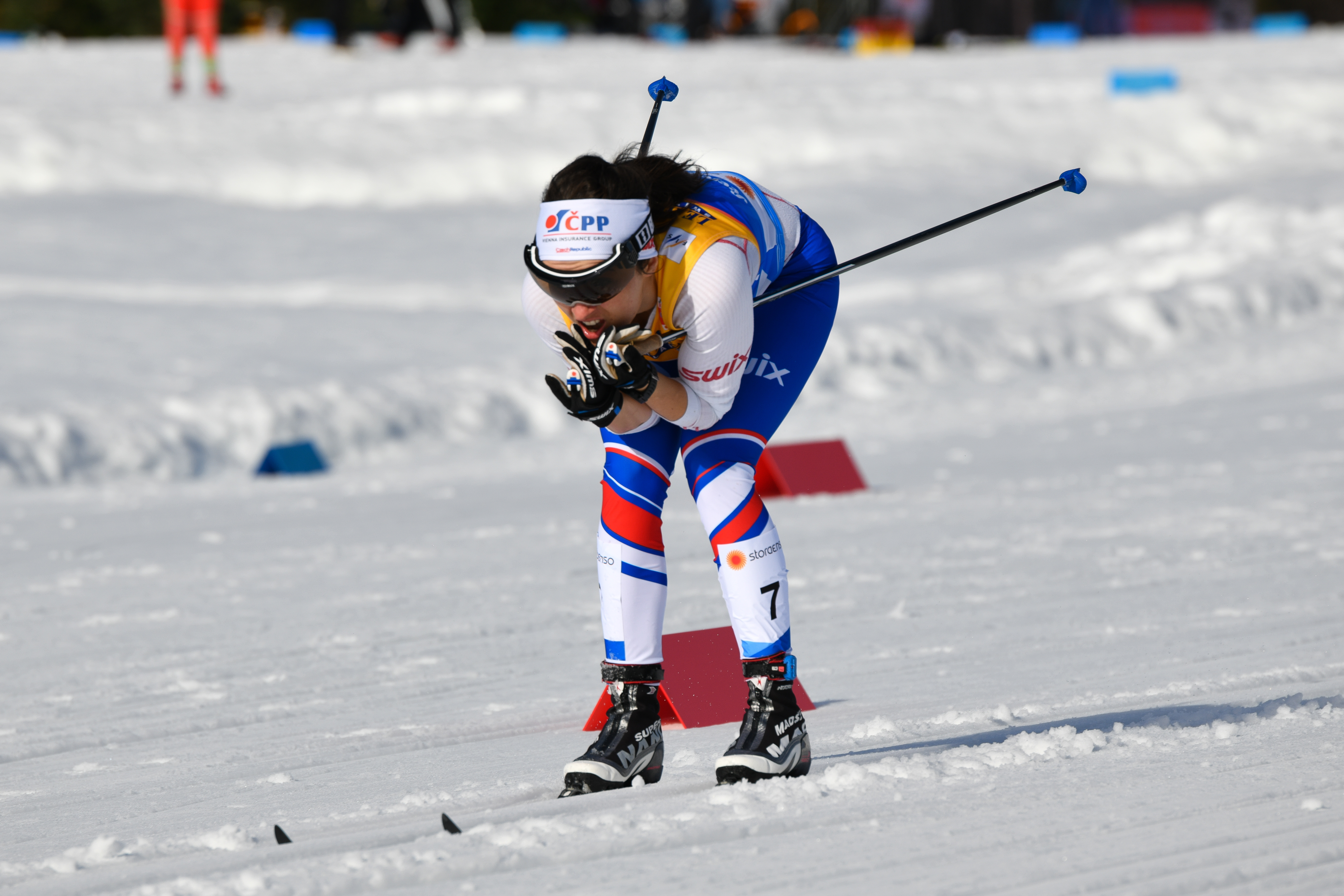
- Razýmová in February 2019

Personal information
- Nationality: Czech Republic
- Born: 10 September 1991 (age 34) Domažlice, Czechoslovakia

Sport
- Sport: Skiing
- Club: Sport Club Plzeň

World Cup career
- Seasons: 8 – (2014, 2016–2021, 2023–present)
- Indiv. starts: 81
- Indiv. podiums: 0
- Team starts: 4
- Team podiums: 0
- Overall titles: 0 – (19th in 2021)
- Discipline titles: 0
- Updated on 27 March 2023

Kateřina Razýmová (née Beroušková, born 10 September 1991) is a Czech cross-country skier who competes internationally.

She competed for the Czech Republic at the FIS Nordic World Ski Championships 2017 in Lahti, Finland.

== Cross-country skiing results ==
All results are sourced from the International Ski Federation (FIS).

=== Olympic Games ===
Year	Age	10 km individual	15 km skiathlon	30 km mass start	Sprint	4 × 5 km relay	Team sprint
2018	26	45	38	23	26	11	11

=== World Championships ===
Year	Age	10 km individual	15 km skiathlon	30 km mass start	Sprint	4 × 5 km relay	Team sprint
2017	25	28	27	27	—	11	—
2019	27	37	29	37	—	11	—
2021	29	25	14	19	—	8	8
2023	31	22	13	21	—	9	—

=== World Cup ===
==== Season standings ====
Season	Age	Discipline standings			Ski Tour standings				
Season	Age	Overall	Distance	Sprint	Nordic Opening	Tour de Ski	Ski Tour 2020	World Cup Final	Ski Tour Canada
2014	22	NC	—	NC	—	—	—N/a	—	—N/a
2016	24	NC	NC	—	—	—	—N/a	—N/a	—
2017	25	NC	NC	NC	56	DNF	—N/a	—	—N/a
2018	26	82	59	NC	—	32	—N/a	—	—N/a
2019	27	60	43	NC	48	23	—N/a	—	—N/a
2020	28	28	20	76	9	DNF	—	—N/a	—N/a
2021	29	19	15	59	22	10	—N/a	—N/a	—N/a
2023	31	40	24	NC	—N/a	17	—N/a	—N/a	—N/a
