= Karolína Grohová =

Czech cross-country skier

Personal information
- Nationality: Czech Republic
- Born: 21 November 1990 (age 35) Dvůr Králové nad Labem, Czechoslovakia

Sport
- Sport: Skiing
- Club: Dukla Liberec

World Cup career
- Seasons: 8 – (2011–2018)
- Indiv. starts: 54
- Indiv. podiums: 0
- Team starts: 7
- Team podiums: 0
- Overall titles: 0 – (88th in 2016)
- Discipline titles: 0
Medal record
Women's cross-country skiing
Representing Czech Republic
Winter Universiade
Bronze medal – third place	2015 Štrbské Pleso	Team sprint

Karolína Grohová (born 21 November 1990 in Dvůr Králové nad Labem) is a Czech cross-country skier.

Grohová competed at the 2014 Winter Olympics for the Czech Republic. She placed 38th in the qualifying round in the sprint, failing to advance to the knockout stages. She also competed with Eva Vrabcová-Nývltová, Petra Nováková and Klára Moravcová in the relay, finishing 10th.

As of April 2014, her best showing at the World Championships is 12th, in the relay in 2013. Her best individual finish is 34th, in the 2013 individual sprint.

Grohová made her World Cup debut in January 2011. As of April 2014, her best finish is 15th, in a classical team sprint race at Asiago in 2013–14. Her best individual finish is 28th, in a freestyle sprint at Lenzerheide in the 2013–14 Tour de Ski. Her best World Cup overall finish is 111th, in 2013–14. Her best World Cup finish in a discipline is 72nd, in the 2013-14 sprint.

== Cross-country skiing results ==
All results are sourced from the International Ski Federation (FIS).

=== Olympic Games ===
Year	Age	10 km individual	15 km skiathlon	30 km mass start	Sprint	4 × 5 km relay	Team sprint
2014	23	—	—	—	37	9	—
2018	27	—	—	—	43	11	—

=== World Championships ===
Year	Age	10 km individual	15 km skiathlon	30 km mass start	Sprint	4 × 5 km relay	Team sprint
2013	22	—	—	—	34	12	—
2015	24	55	43	38	42	—	—
2017	26	—	—	—	33	—	12

=== World Cup ===
Season Standings
Season	Age	Discipline standings			Ski Tour standings			
Season	Age	Overall	Distance	Sprint	Nordic Opening	Tour de Ski	World Cup Final	Ski Tour Canada
2011	20	123	—	85	—	—	—	—N/a
2012	21	NC	—	NC	—	—	—	—N/a
2013	22	NC	—	NC	—	—	—	—N/a
2014	23	111	NC	72	72	DNF	—	—N/a
2015	24	NC	NC	NC	DNF	—	—N/a	—N/a
2016	25	88	NC	56	61	DNF	—N/a	—
2017	26	NC	NC	NC	54	—	—	—N/a
2018	27	NC	NC	NC	61	DNF	—	—N/a
