= Kateryna Serdiuk =

Ukrainian cross-country skier (born 1989)

Personal information
- Born: 1989 (age 36–37)

Sport
- Sport: Skiing

Kateryna Serdiuk (Ukrainian: Катерина Сердюк, Russian: Екатери́на Сердю́к; born 1989) is a Ukrainian cross-country skier.

== Early life ==
Kateryna Serdiuk was born in 1989.

== Career ==
Serdiuk competed at the 2014 Winter Olympics for Ukraine. She placed 45th in the qualifying round in the sprint, failing to advance to the knockout stages. She was scheduled to compete in the team sprint with Maryna Lisohor, but did not start due to injury. The National Olympic Committee of Ukraine claimed Serdiuk was injured.

Serdiuk made her World Cup debut in November 2008. As of April 2014, her best finish is 11th, in a relay event at La Clusaz in 2008–09. Her best individual finish is 56th, in a freestyle mass start event at La Clusaz in 2008–09.
