= Viktoriya Olekh =

Ukrainian cross country skier (born 1993)

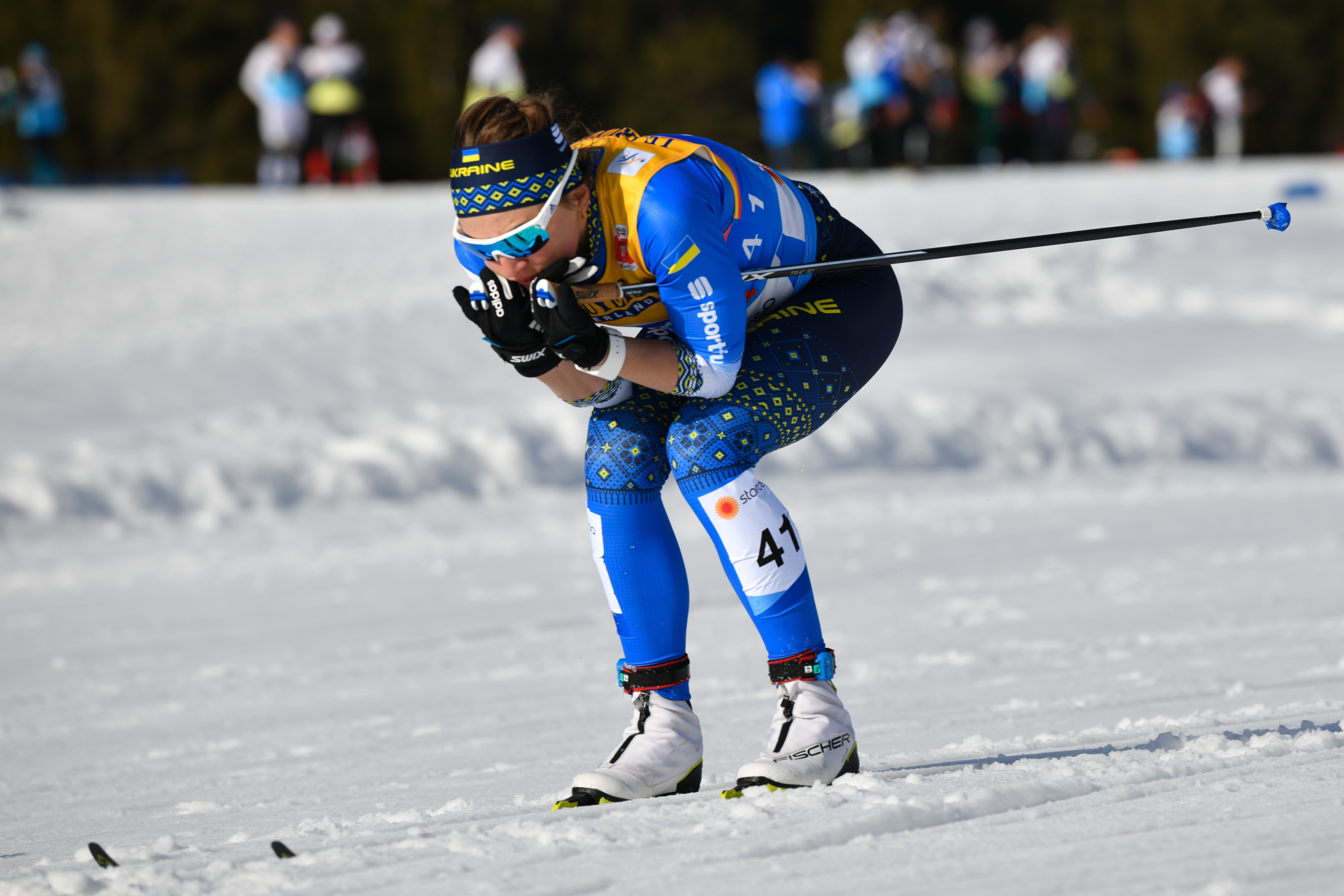
- Olekh on February 26, 2019, in Seefeld

Personal information
- Full name: Viktoriya Viktorivna Olekh
- Nationality: Ukraine
- Born: 2 October 1993 (age 33) Konotop, Ukraine

Sport
- Sport: Skiing
- Club: Armed Forces of Ukraine

World Cup career
- Seasons: 2 – (2021, 2023–present)
- Indiv. starts: 13
- Indiv. podiums: 0
- Team starts: 4
- Team podiums: 0
- Overall titles: 0 – (113th in 2021)
- Discipline titles: 0
- Updated on 27 March 2023

Viktoriya Viktorivna Olekh (Ukrainian: Вікторія Віторівна Олех, born 2 October 1993) is a Ukrainian cross country skier who has competed internationally since 2011. She competed at the 2022 Winter Olympics, in Women's 10 kilometre classical, Women's 30 kilometre freestyle, Women's 15 kilometre skiathlon, Women's sprint, and Women's 4 × 5 kilometre relay.

== Career ==
Olekh started her international career in 2011 when she participated at the 2011 European Youth Olympic Winter Festival in Liberec, Czech Republic where her best result was 36th in 7.5 km classical race. After that she participated at three FIS Nordic Junior World Ski Championships between 2011 and 2013 (with her best personal result being 54th in 10 km skiathlon in Turkish Erzerum in 2012). Olekh also took part in three Universiades (2013, 2015, and 2017), with her best individual finish being 28th in 5 km freestyle pursuit and best team result being 5th in 3x5 km relay (together with Tarasenko and Nasyko) both in 2017.

She debuted at World Cup on January 23, 2021, in Finnish Lahti where she finished 49th in skiathlon. As of January 2022, Olekh's best World Cup individual finish was 47th in a 10 km freestyle pursuit in Ruka, Finland, on November 28, 2021, and best World Cup team finish was 11th in a 4x5 km relay in Lahti, Finland, on January 24, 2021 (together with Antsybor, Kaminska, and Kovalova).

In 2022, Viktoriya Olekh was nominated for her first Winter Games in Beijing.

She participated at two FIS Nordic World Ski Championships. As of January 2022, her best individual finish was 46th in 30 km classical race in 2021.

== Cross-country skiing results ==
All results are sourced from the International Ski Federation (FIS).

=== Olympic Games ===
Year	Age	10 km individual	15 km skiathlon	30 km mass start	Sprint	4 × 5 km relay	Team sprint
2022	28	76	60	58	69	18	—

=== World Championships ===
Year	Age	10 km individual	15 km skiathlon	30 km mass start	Sprint	4 × 5 km relay	Team sprint
2019	25	70	47	46	74	17	—
2021	27	73	56	—	67	13	—
2023	29	52	48	—	57	—	18

=== World Cup ===
==== Season standings ====
Season	Age	Discipline standings			Ski Tour standings	
Season	Age	Overall	Distance	Sprint	Nordic Opening	Tour de Ski
2021	27	113	83	NC	—	—
2023	29	162	128	NC	—N/a	—
