= Michiko Suganuma =

Japanese artist (1928–2015)

Michiko Suganuma (Japanese: 菅沼 三千子, Hepburn: Suganuma Michiko, born 1940) is a leading Japanese Kamakura-bori artist using a technique she calls Wagae-nuri. She is the only Japanese female to have presented her collection at exhibitions of National Gallery of Victoria in Melbourne. Her works are held in the collection of the gallery.

== Career ==
After graduating from Joshibi University of Art and Design, Michiko Suganuma studied Kamakura-bori, a traditional form of lacquerware in her 20s. She opened her first studio in 1977. For 12 years from 1985 she was a visiting teacher at primary schools in Zushi, Kanagawa.

== Selected exhibitions and collections ==
In 1984 Michiko Suganuma had an exhibition of her urushi-ware and Kamakura-bori work at the National Gallery of Victoria. The gallery purchased Michiko's urushi-ware called Cinnabar Red lacquer then. In 1998 the Minato Ward Office purchased Michiko’s Kamakura-bori which was exhibited at the National Gallery of Victoria in 1984 and was finally presented to the Australian Embassy of Tokyo. In 1984, Michiko Suganuma successfully held the first living artist’s exhibition at the National Gallery of Victoria in Melbourne, Australia, where she showed five Kamakura-bori and five urushi pieces. In 2004, her tea ceremony works were shown as part of the Gallery's "The Art of Zen" exhibition. She also participated in the Gallery's 2006 exhibition "Focus on Japanese Lacquer".

Her work can be seen at the National Gallery of Victoria in Melbourne and at the Australian Embassy of Tokyo.

== Awards ==
In 1976 Michiko Suganuma was given a certificate for urushi coating by the Governor of Kanagawa Prefecture. In 1978 at Tokyo Metropolitan Art Gallery, she obtained Freshman Prize for a transparent urushi piece. In the same year, the object was also selected by Kanagawa-prefecture. From 1979 to 1982, she obtained Encouragement Prize, Effort Prize, Industrial Arts Great Prize for transparent urushi pieces at Tokyo Metropolitan Art Gallery. Her urishi-ware won Japanese regional awards in 1992.

The 40 cm across piece of work was officially fixed as the Minato Ward Office's specified lacquerware in 2012. The office would keep the lacquerware permanently and hire out the piece occasionally.

== Style ==
She makes Cinnabar-red lacquerware using a coating method basing on Kamakura-bori technique which she calls Wagae-nuri (和賀江塗). Another of her techniques combines the brilliance of Shin-nuri (enamel) with the dullness of an unpolished oxidized silver.
