= Carved lacquer =

Chinese form of lacquerware

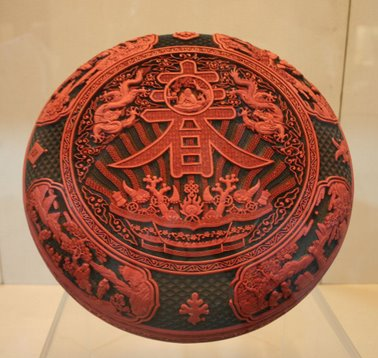
Box with the character for "Spring" (春), Qianlong period, Qing dynasty. Nanjing Museum

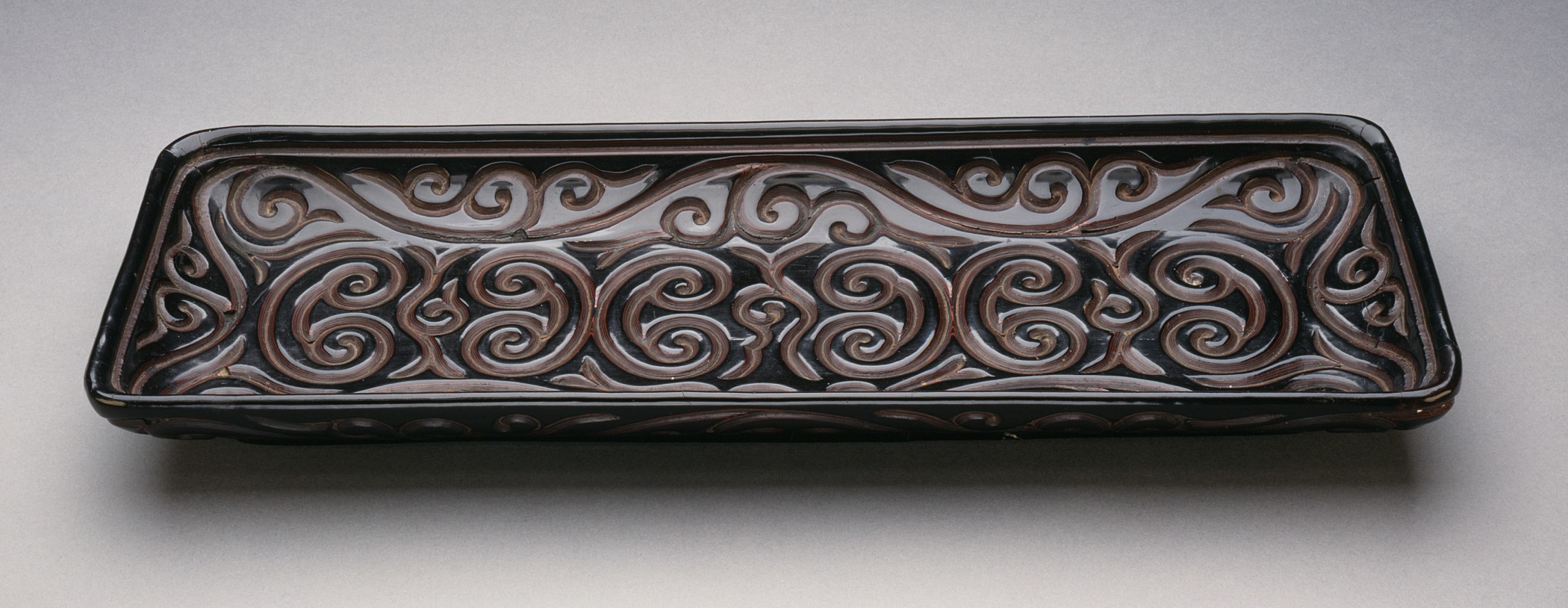
Changfang Pan (rectangular tray) with Sword-Pommel Pattern, black with red layers, Middle Ming, about 1450–1550

Carved lacquer or Qidiao (Chinese: 漆雕) is a distinctive Chinese form of decorated lacquerware. While lacquer has been used in China for at least 3,000 years, the technique of carving into very thick coatings of it appears to have been developed in the 12th century CE. It is extremely time-consuming to produce, and has always been a luxury product, essentially restricted to China, though imitated in Japanese lacquer in somewhat different styles. The producing process is called Diaoqi (雕漆, carving lacquer).

Though most surviving examples are from the Ming and Qing dynasties, the main types of subject matter for the carvings were all begun under the Song dynasty, and the development of both these and the technique of carving were essentially over by the early Ming. These types were the abstract guri or Sword-Pommel pattern, figures in a landscape, and birds and plants. To these some designs with religious symbols, animals, auspicious characters (right) and imperial dragons can be added.

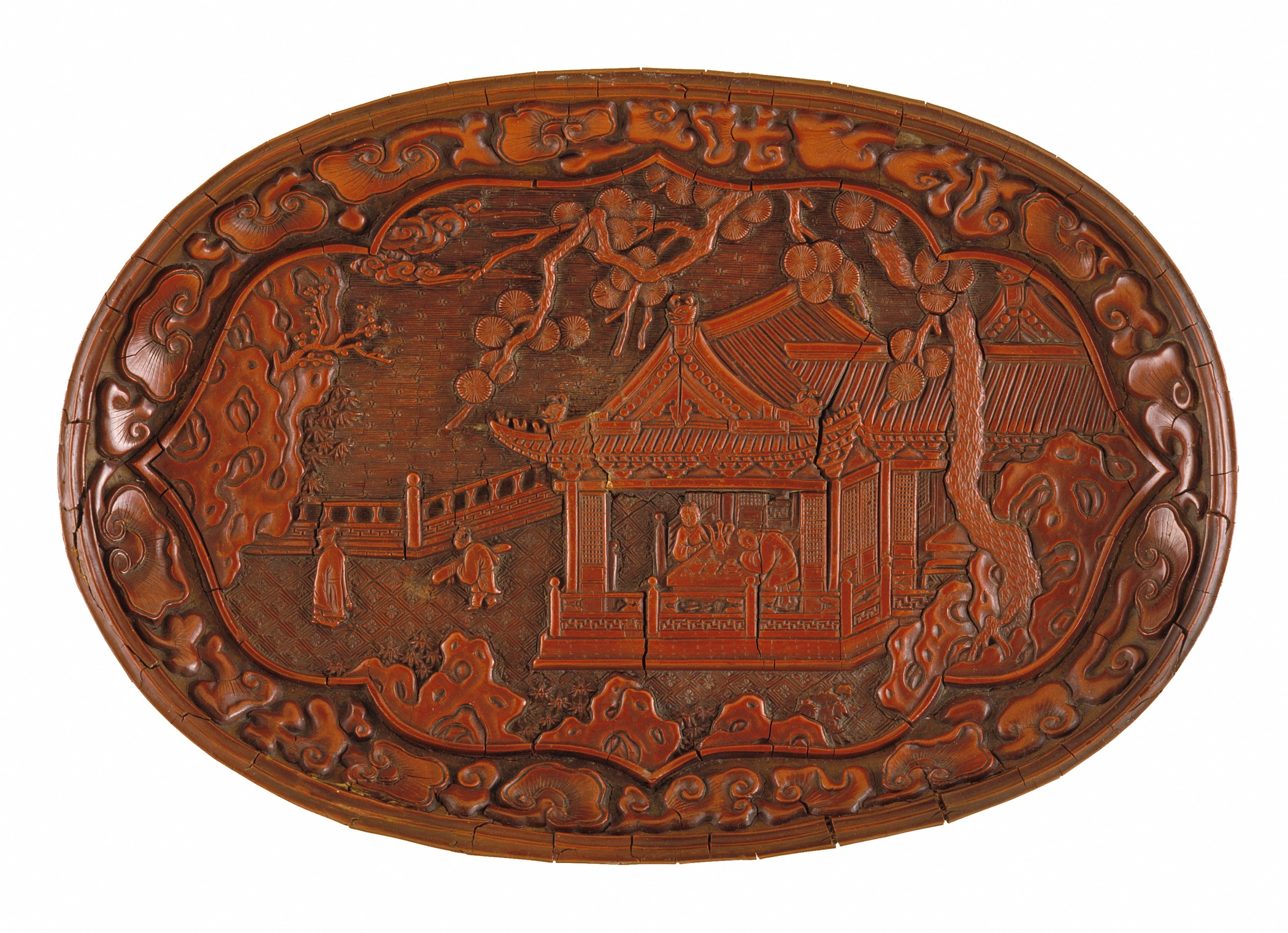
Tuoyuan pan (oval tray) with people in a landscape, 24.5 cm wide, Yuan

The objects made in the technique are a wide range of small types, but are mostly practical vessels or containers such as boxes, plates and trays. Some screens and pieces of Chinese furniture were made. Carved lacquer is only rarely combined with painting in lacquer and other lacquer techniques.

== History ==
Later Chinese writers dated the introduction of carved lacquer to the Tang dynasty (618–906), and many modern writers have pointed to some late Tang pieces of armour found on the Silk Road by Aurel Stein and now in the British Museum. These are red and black lacquer on camel hide, but the lacquer is very thin, "less than one millimeter in thickness", and the effect very different, with simple abstract shapes on a plain field and almost no impression of relief.

=== Song dynasty, and the main types of subject matter ===
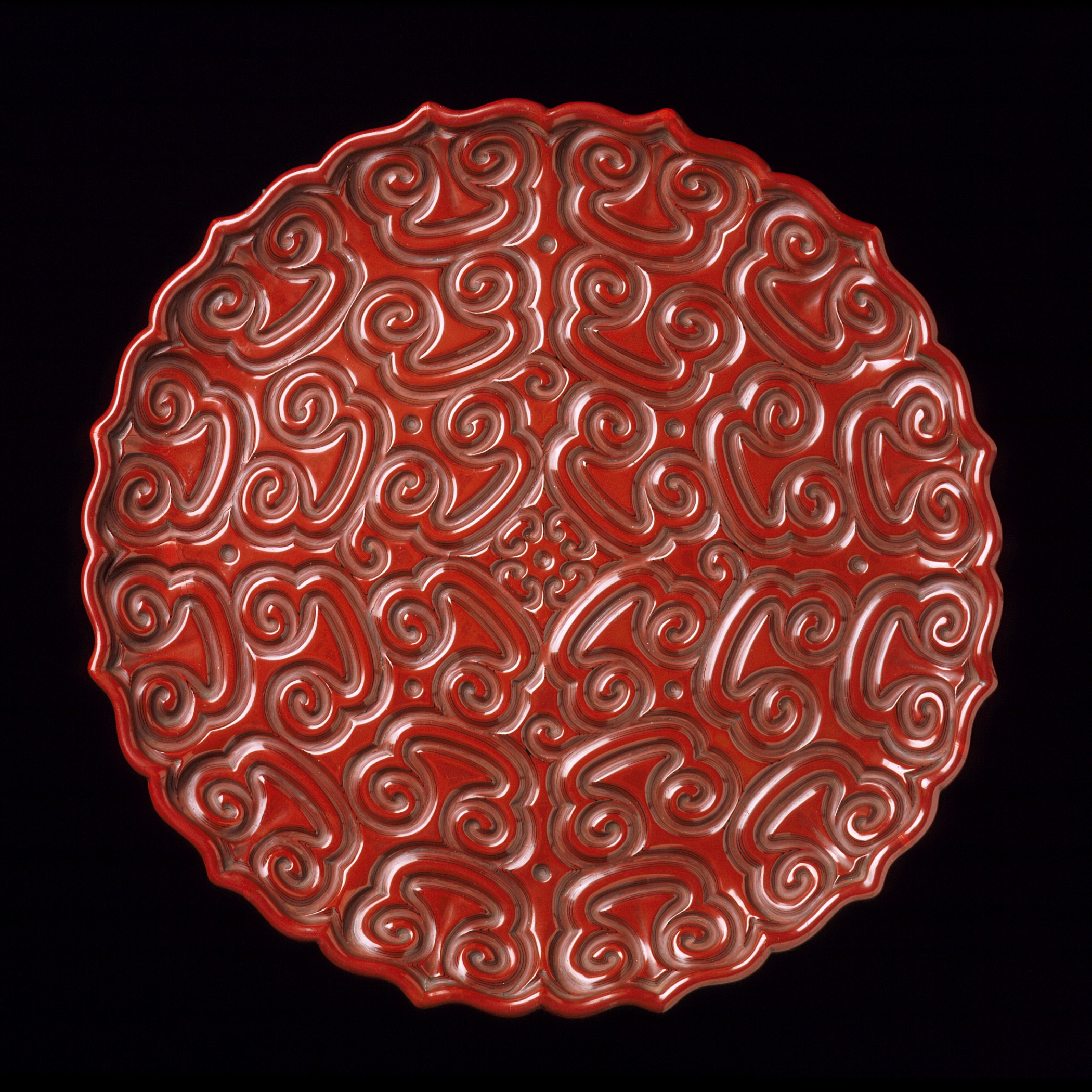
Foliated dish or tray in the tixi technique with the guri or "Sword-Pommel Pattern", here using red with three thin layers of black. The polished top layer of red contrasts with the duller bottom layer. Early Ming.

The style of carving into thick lacquer used later is first seen in the Southern Song (1127–1279), following the development of techniques for making very thick lacquer. There is some evidence from literary sources that it had existed in the late Tang. At first the style of decoration used is known as guri (屈輪) from the Japanese word for the ring-pommel of a sword, where the same motifs were used in metal, and is often called the "Sword-Pommel pattern" in English. This style uses a family of repeated two-branched scrolling shapes cut with a rounded profile at the surface, but below that a "V" section through layers of lacquer in different colours (black, red and yellow, and later green), giving a "marbled" effect from the contrasted colours; this technique is called tìxī (剔犀) in Chinese. This style continued to be used up to the Ming dynasty, especially on small boxes and jars with covers, though after the Song only red was often used, and the motifs were often carved with wider flat spaces at the bottom level to be exposed.

Most Song carved lacquer to survive is in the guri and tixi style and technique, but the period also saw the development of a pictorial style, and the beginning of the two other main streams of iconography that were to dominate the rest of the history of carved lacquer, though surviving examples from the Song are rare. Both relate to Chinese art in other media, and use the existing vocabulary of Chinese ornament for borders. The first type of subject is scenes of people in a landscape, derived mainly from Chinese painting and woodcut book illustrations; such scenes were only later to be found in Chinese ceramics. The settings quickly became fairly standardized, with a few figures close to one or more buildings, in a garden setting, perhaps near water or a road (the English chinoiserie "Willow pattern" is just such a scene). A convention developed by which the areas of sky, water and land (floor or ground) left largely blank in paintings are filled in with discreet patterns derived from textiles, known as "brocade-grounds" and also "diaper backgrounds"; this convention has continued to modern times. Standard groups of patterns for each type are followed in work from the imperial workshops, but may be mixed up in work from the commercial workshops. The precise form of patterns used can be a factor in dating pieces, but in general "The background diaper of sky consisted of looping clouds, diapers representing water were cut in rhomboid curves for waves, and the land and paving had diapers with geometricized flowers".

The other main type of subject was birds against a foliage background that filled the whole carved area, or just flowers and foliage treated in the same way. Dragons and phoenixes were also treated in this style, and became very prominent in Ming imperial works (see below). A design of this type known as the "two birds" was especially successful aesthetically and often used; in later examples the birds are often the fenghuang or Chinese phoenix. The style continued to develop until reaching its finest period in the early Ming dynasty, and has continued to be produced. Plant decoration of this sort was later generally used to fill in borders and other spaces around other types of subject, such as the edges and legs of furniture. This style relates to a broad tradition of Chinese ornament reaching back into Chinese antiquity in stone reliefs, metalwork and other media, including ceramics.

Lacquer was among the luxury products often given by the emperor as diplomatic or political gifts, or to the subsidiary courts of princes of the imperial house. Japanese collections, often accumulated in temples, have a high proportion of the surviving early Chinese carved lacquer pieces. The Engaku-ji temple in Kamakura has an especially important group of pieces, some of which are credibly reputed to have been brought to Japan by its founder, a refugee monk escaping the fall of the Song dynasty to the Mongols in 1279.

==== Guri pattern and tixi technique ====
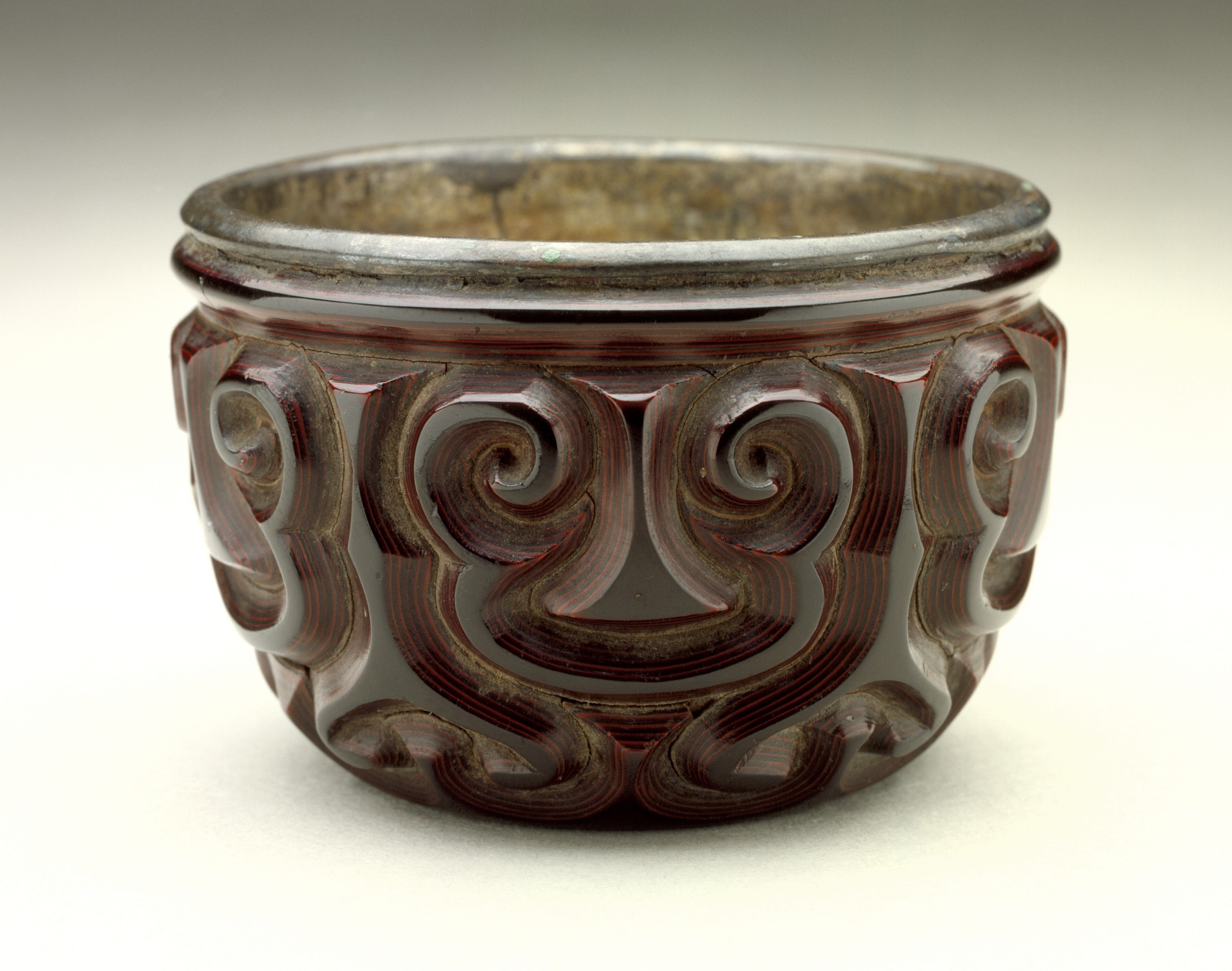
Bei (Cup) with guri Sword-Pommel Pattern, in tixi, with silver interior. Song or Yuan. Straight sides to grooves, and several thin layers of red.

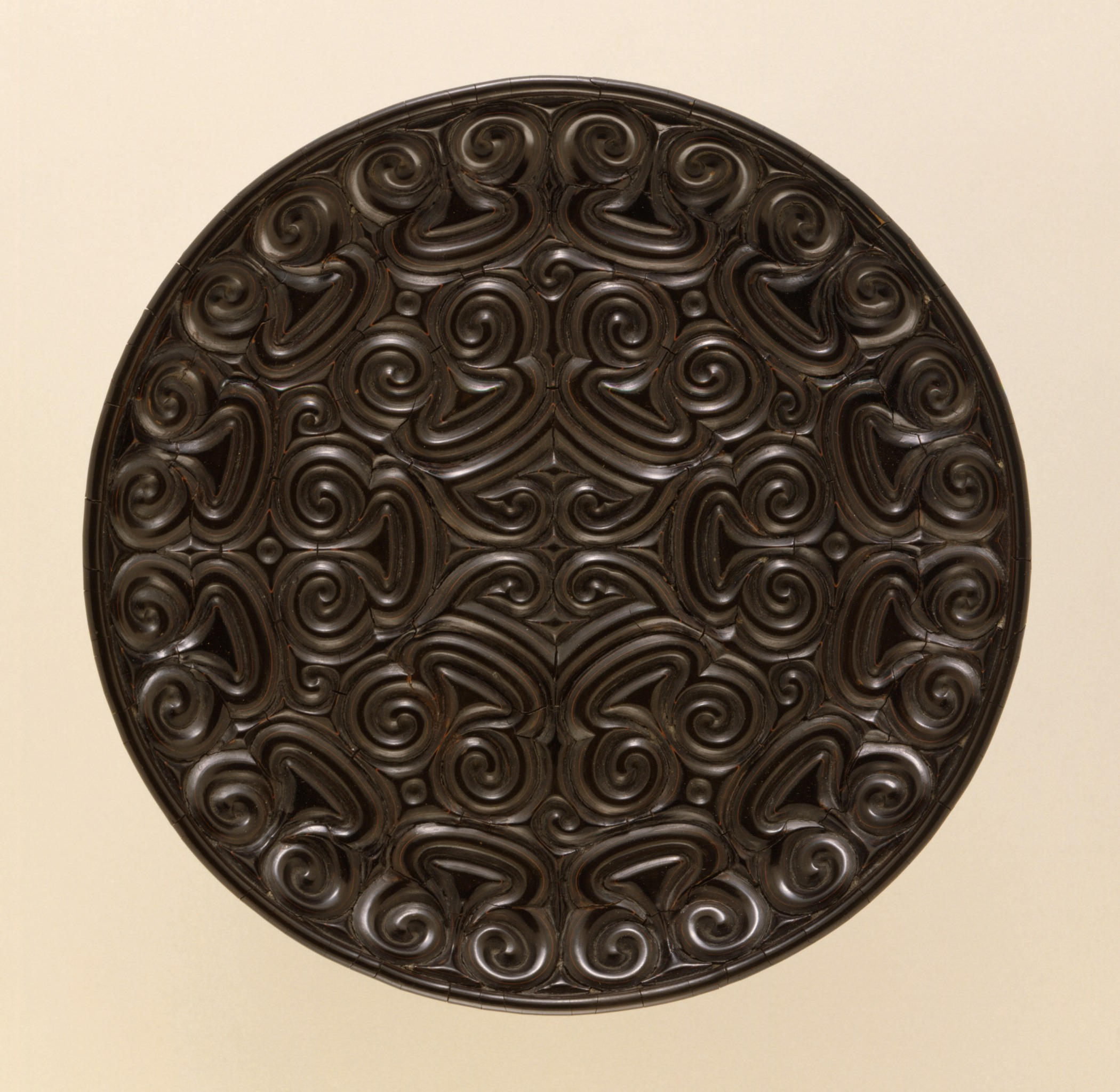
Pan (Dish) with Sword-Pommel Pattern, Yuan. Brown with red layers

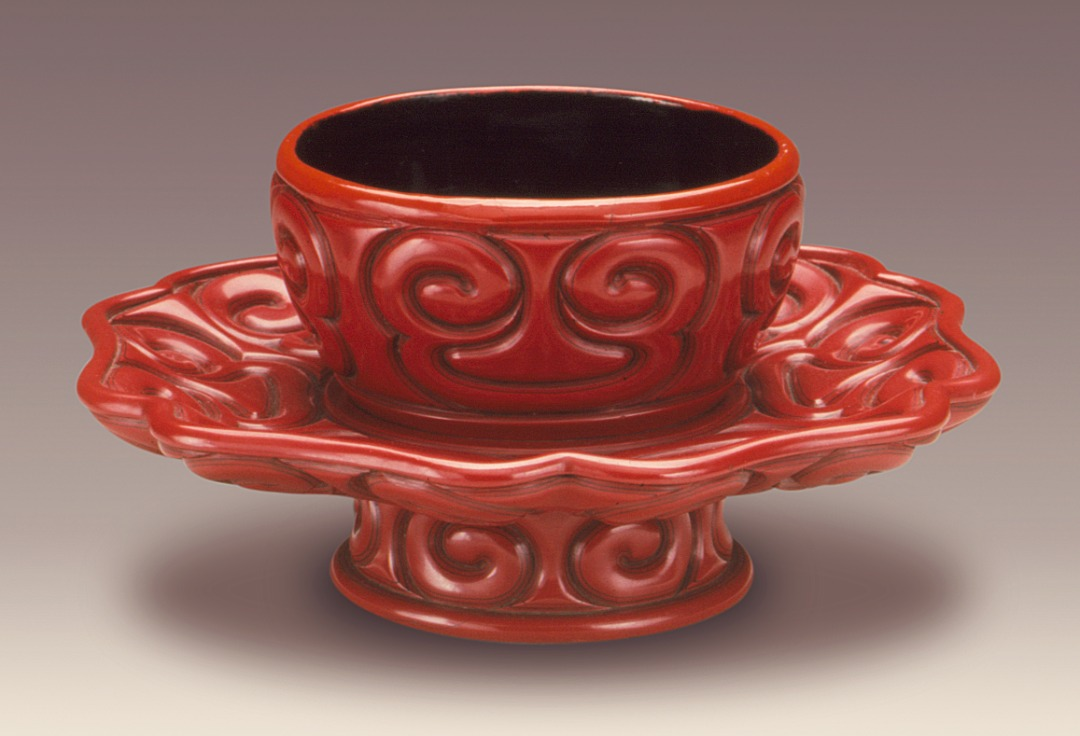
Tuozhan (Cup Stand) in the Form of a Lotus Blossom with Sword-Pommel Pattern, early Ming. Very rounded carving, and a few black layers.

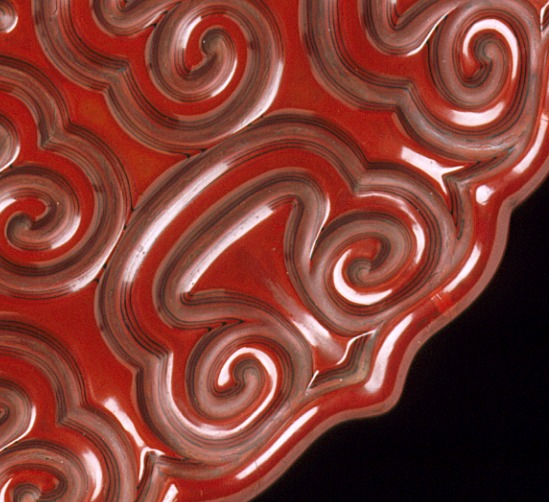
Foliated Pan (Dish) with Sword-Pommel Pattern, detail of the tray and layers of different colours can be seen above.

=== Yuan ===
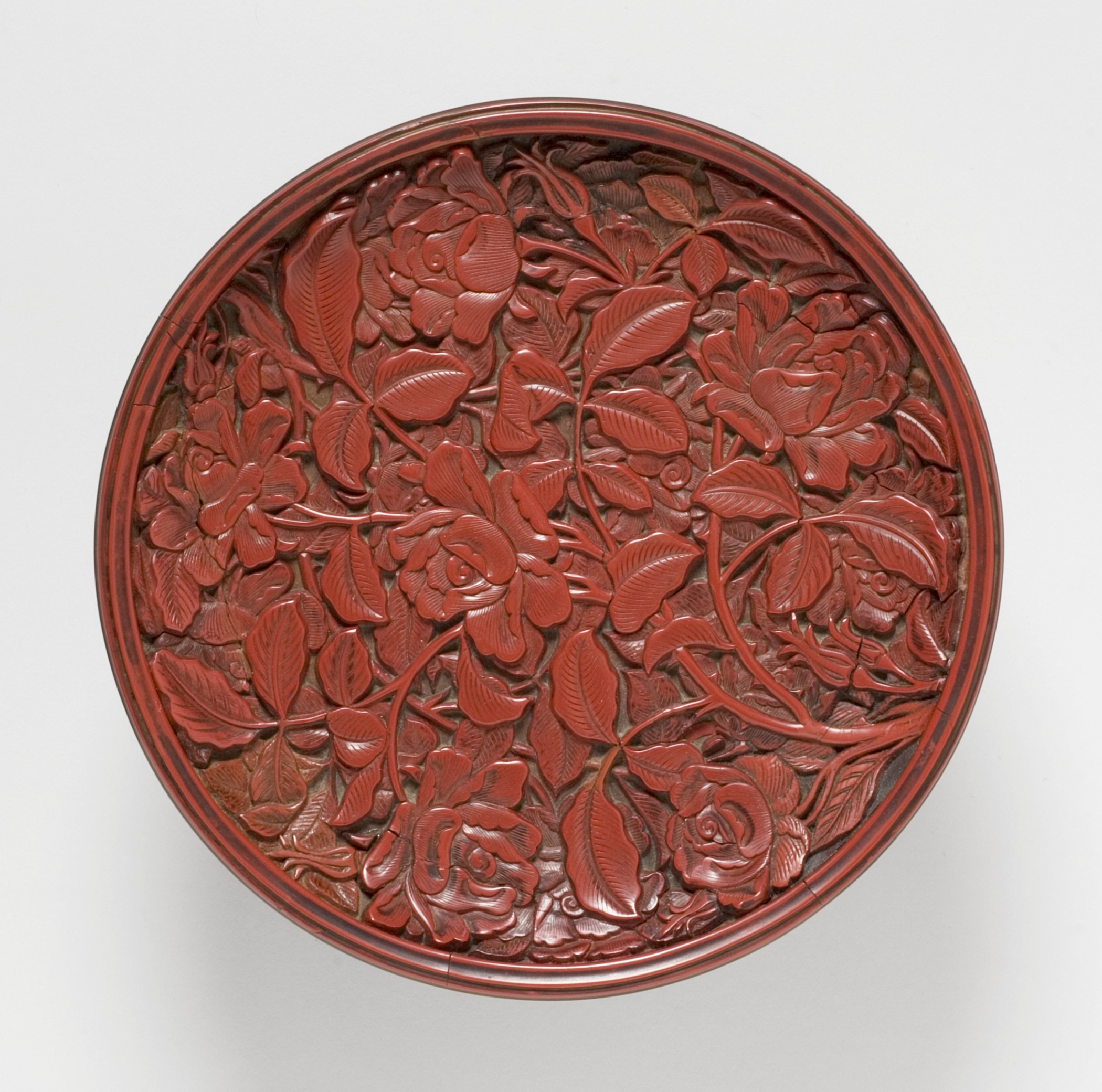
Dish with roses, Yuan dynasty, 16 cm across

In the Yuan dynasty the development of Song styles continued, especially from about 1320, after something of a hiatus (as also seen in other arts). Pieces in the Sword-Pommel pattern have more rounded tops to the ridges, and more narrow bottoms. The artistic quality of carving was perhaps never higher, in all the main streams of iconography: Sword-Pommel pattern, birds, flowers and foliage, and figures in landscapes. In the crowded, "exuberant and complex" designs with birds and plants, the forms overlap and curl in a more sculptural fashion, allowed by slightly thicker lacquer.

By the late Yuan the reputation of individual masters has come down to us, although few pieces are signed and even these cannot be very confidently assigned to an artist, as the signatures may not be genuine. Yang Mao and Zhang Cheng were the most famous masters, both from Jiaxing in the southern province of Zhejiang.

==== Bird and plant designs ====
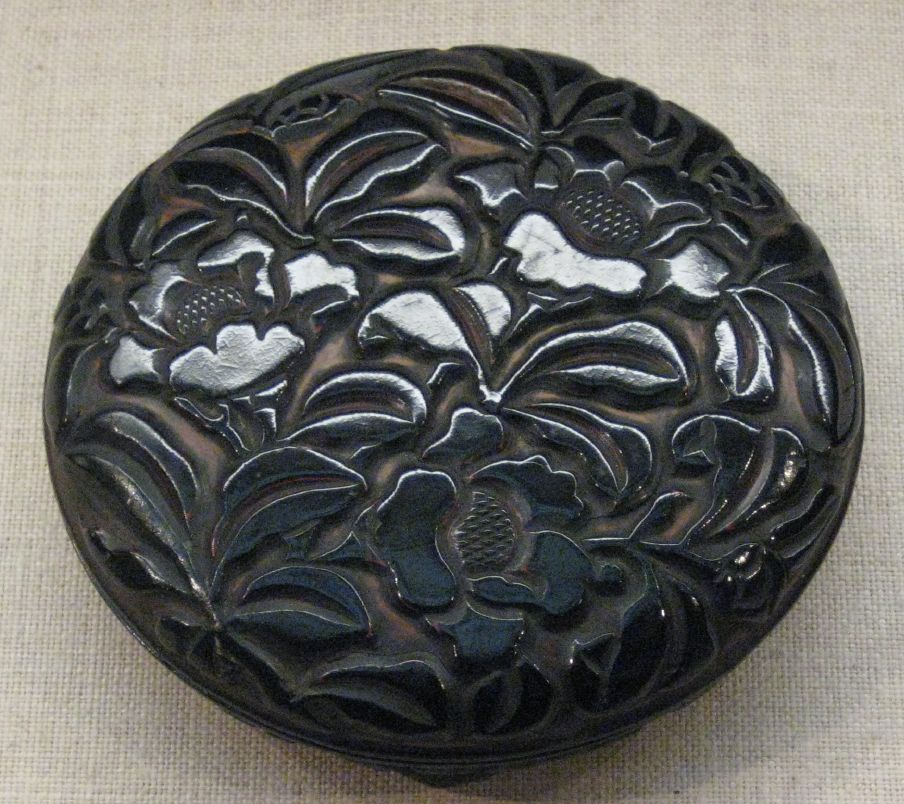
Box with Camellias, Song

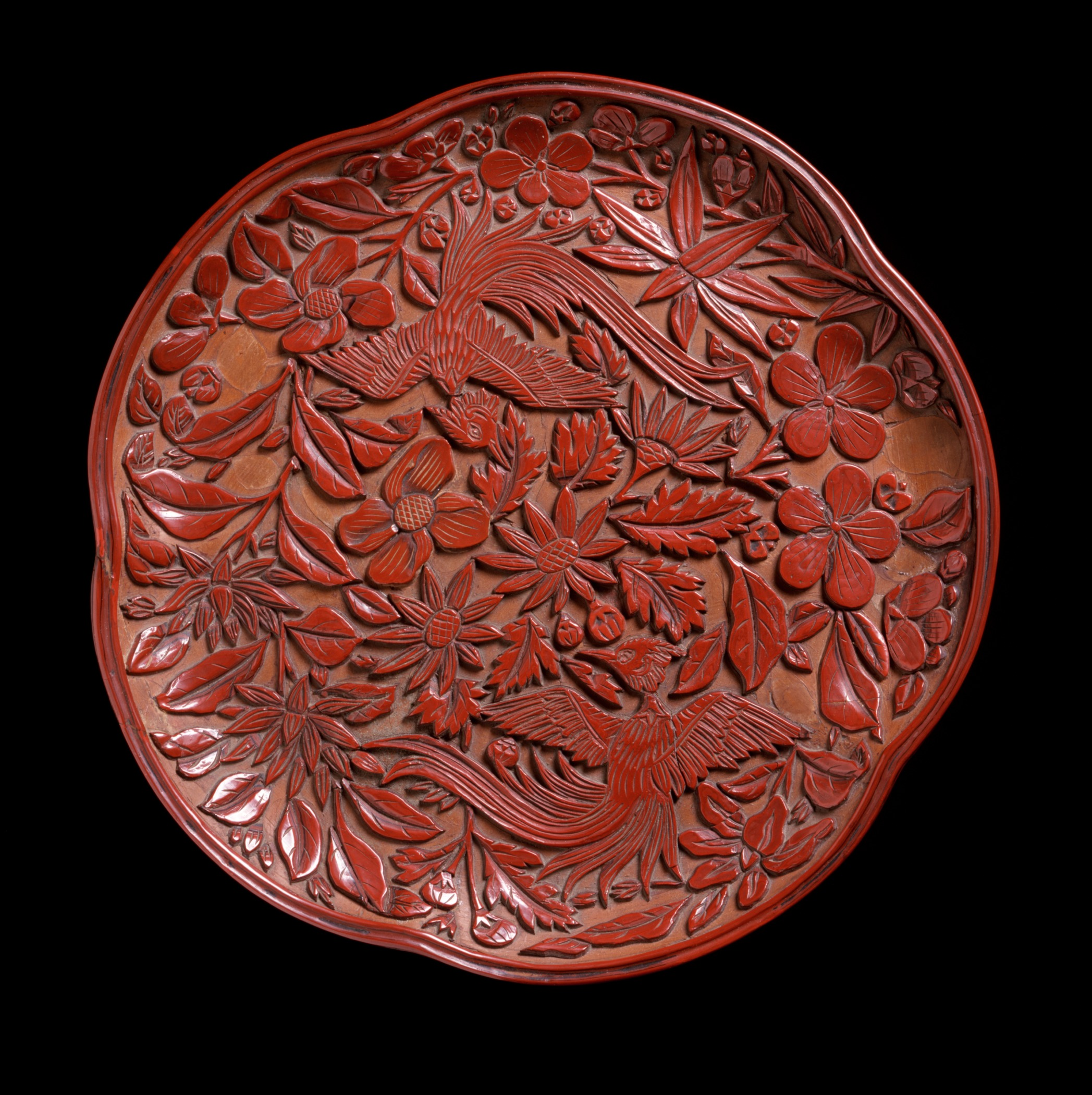
Tray with two birds against a background of plum blossom and flowers, 19 cm wide, late Song, 13th century (oblique view). No overlapping of forms, and relatively wide strips of background visible.

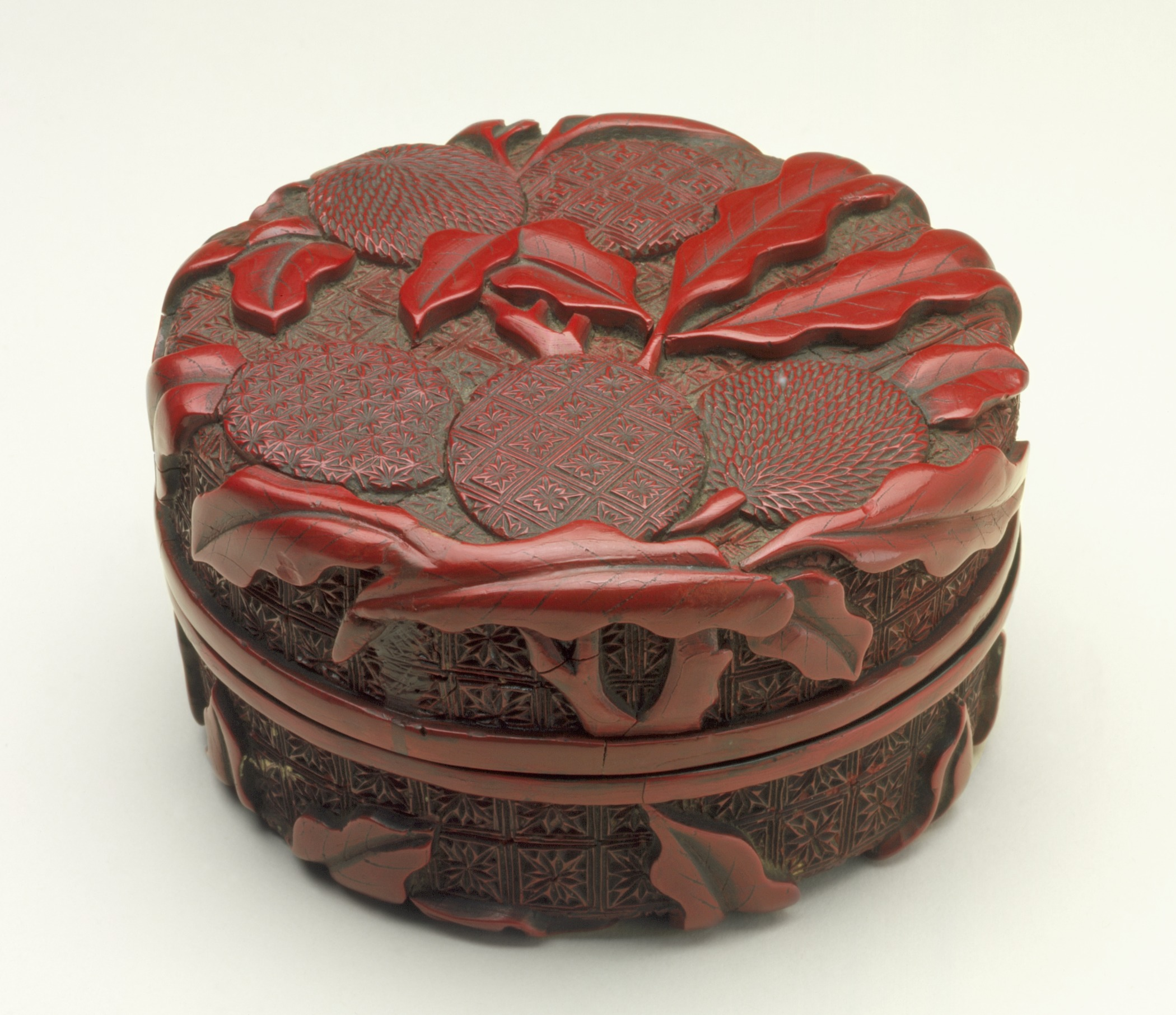
Yinni He (Seal Paste Box) with Litchi Stems, 7.5 cm wide, Middle Ming, 1450–1500. Brocade-ground patterns are used both for the background and on the fruit.

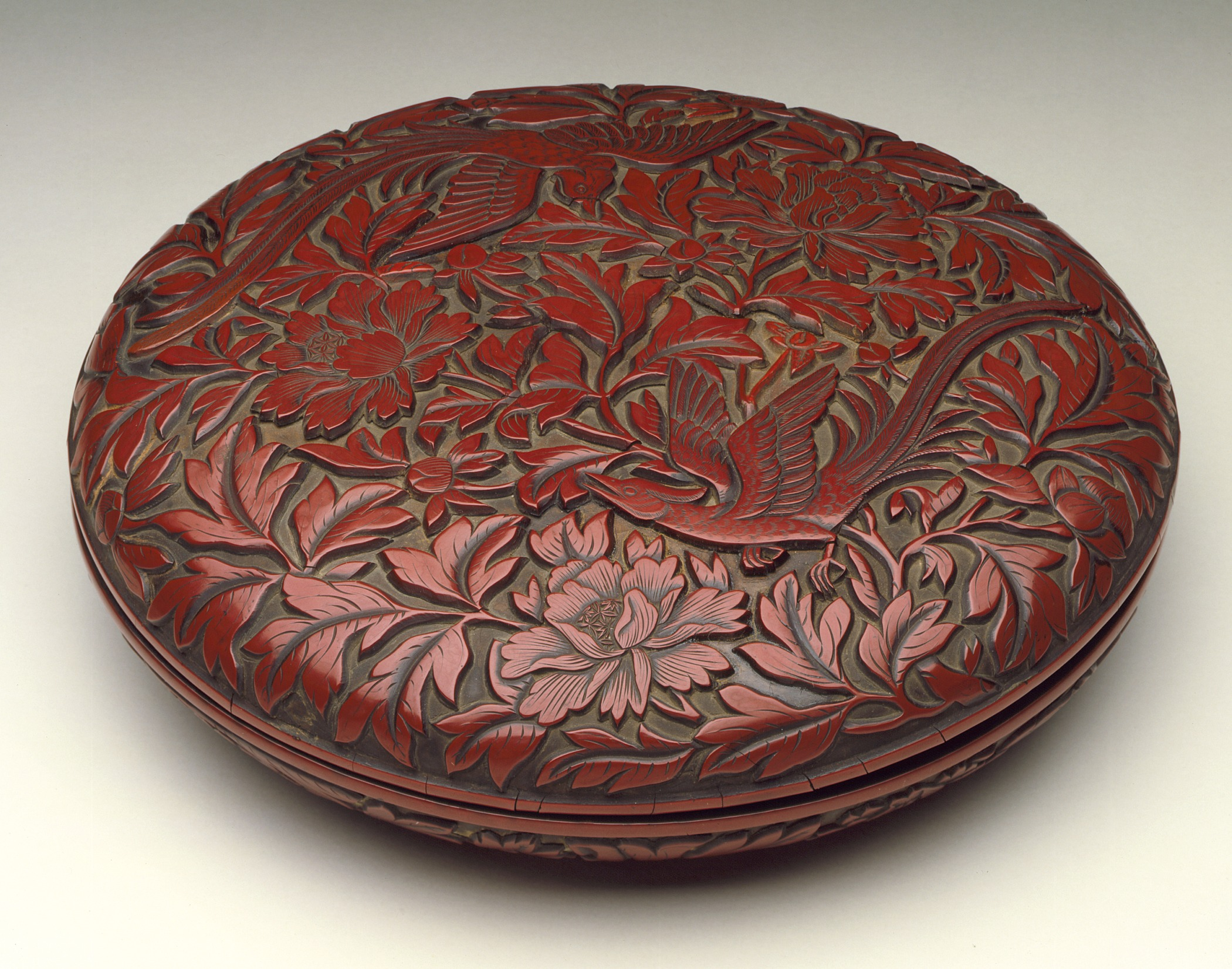
He (Box) with Pair of Pheasants in Peonies, late Ming, 19 cm wide. Thin top layers of red over black give effective contrasts.

=== Ming ===
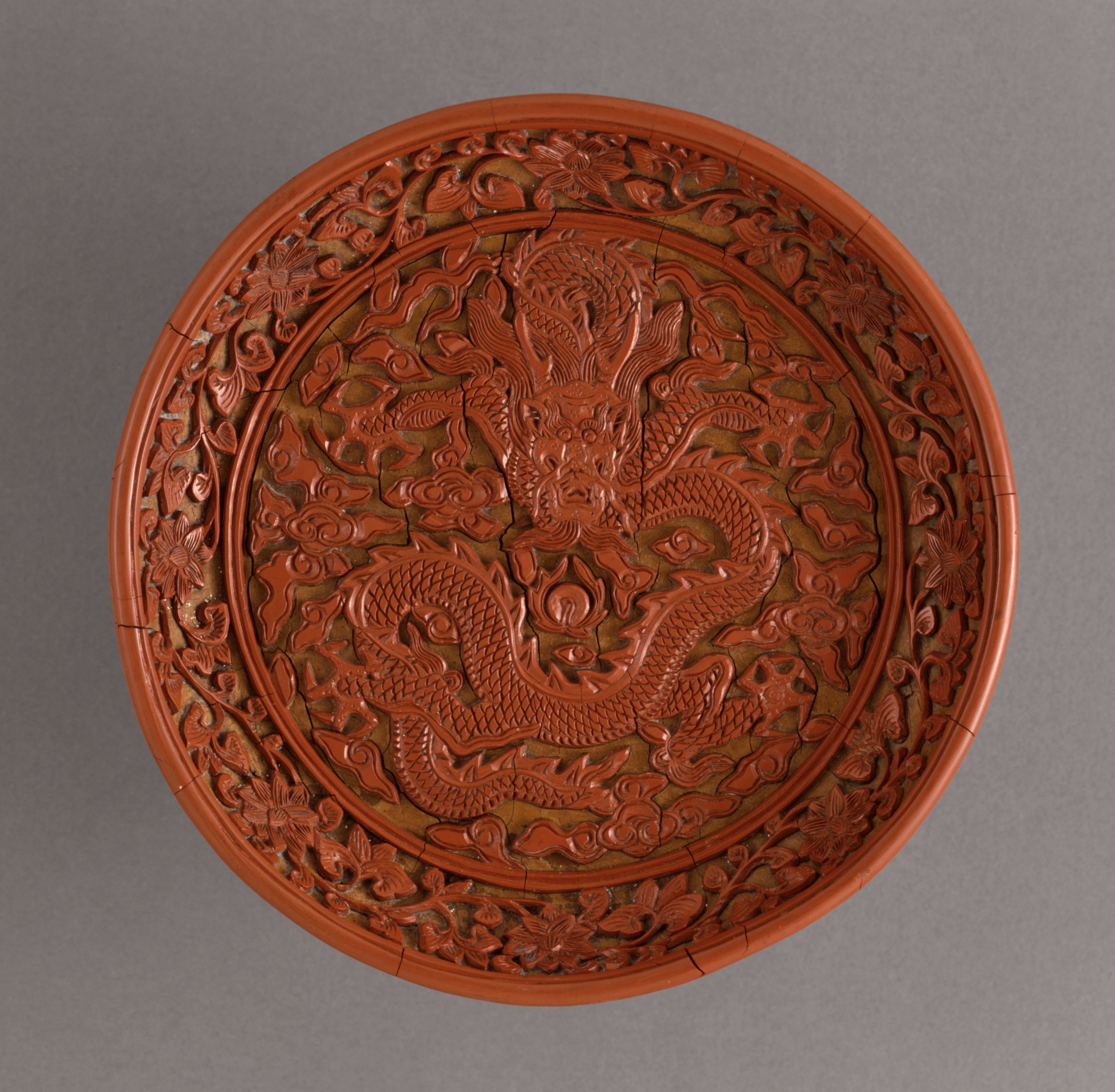
Ming Wanli period tray with "frontal" dragon against a background of clouds, with a floral border. Red over rather faded buff yellow lacquer

Chinese diplomatic gifts to the Japanese government in the early Ming are especially well-documented on the Japanese side, at a time when the Ashikaga shogunate was enjoying a period of improved relations with China. In 1403 a consignment of luxury goods, also including Chinese silks and lacquered Chinese furniture, had 58 pieces of carved red lacquerware in a range of shapes. Lists with descriptions and measurements that allow some surviving pieces to be identified also survive from 1406, 1407, 1433 and 1434. These confirm that carved red lacquer was already "the favored type of lacquer for court use" by this point.

Most early production of lacquer had been in the more suitable hot and moist climate of the south, but from the early Ming onwards the finest work was often from official workshops in Beijing, and the best early Ming work is "technically ... as near perfection as has ever been possible".

The "Orchard Factory" was founded around 1416 in Lingjing hutong in Beijing, near the Forbidden City. It used imported workers from the south, the masters from Jiaxing in Zhejiang province, and other workers from Yunnan and Sichuan. As part of the internal tax or tribute system, about 5,000 workers from the south were required to work in the imperial workshops for terms of four years. The raw lacquer was also imported from the south, as the Chinese lacquer tree will not grow as far north as Beijing. Beijing was an unpromising location for lacquer production, being very cold in winter, and with dry and dusty air; the opposite of what was best. The Orchard Factory closed in 1436, after only some 20 years of operations. The production of imperial wares seems to have lapsed between 1436 and 1522, after another Mongol invasion, from which lacquer production took longer to recover than Jingdezhen porcelain.

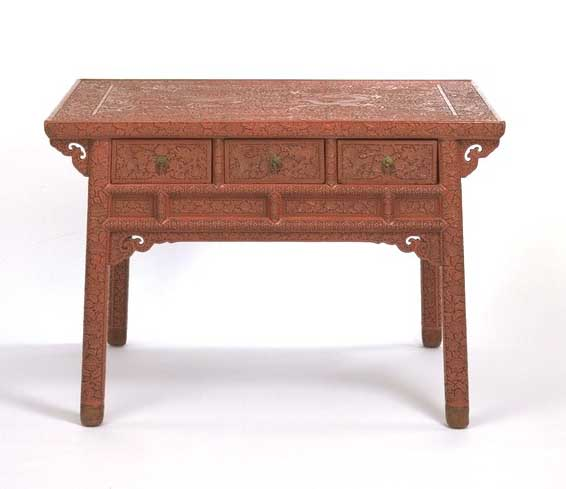
The Ming table in the Victoria and Albert Museum, 1425–1436

In the Ming period the dragon became a key imperial symbol, very often appearing on lacquer from the imperial workshops for the use of the court, or made to be given by the emperor. Initially the dragon's head was seen in the traditional profile but in the middle of the 15th century the "frontal" dragon, seen looking out full-face at the viewer, was introduced and soon became the norm in lacquer as in other media.

By at least the Ming dynasty carved lacquer was being used all over the visible surfaces of pieces of furniture, a dauntingly expensive proposition. One of the best known pieces is a desk-sized table with three drawers in the Victoria and Albert Museum in London, whose top has a typical imperial Ming design with a central dragon and phoenix, symbolizing the emperor and empress respectively. The table-top measures 119.5 cm by 84.5 cm and it was produced between 1425 and 1436 in the "Orchard Factory", and is the only piece of its size to survive from their production, the best period of Ming workmanship. As with many other pieces, the ground of the relief was originally a yellow that contrasted with the red of the upper layers, but has now faded to a dark colour. Black grounds under red carved layers were also common from this period, but in some cases what now appears black may originally have been green. A less common type, often of very high quality, has black upper layers on a red ground.

From about 1400, the "brocade-ground" patterns already used for floors and sky in scenes of figures in a landscape were also used in depicting plant designs, both on the backgrounds and on the leaves or fruits of the plants themselves, "a curious development". More logically, they were also used for the background of non-representational designs such as characters of Chinese script.

Though sometimes used earlier, polychrome carved lacquer in a variety of the tixi technique was only prominent during the period between the Jiajing Emperor and Wanli Emperor (1521–1620). This involved carving different parts of the image down to expose a layer in a different colour, so building up a coloured image.

==== Landscape and figure designs ====
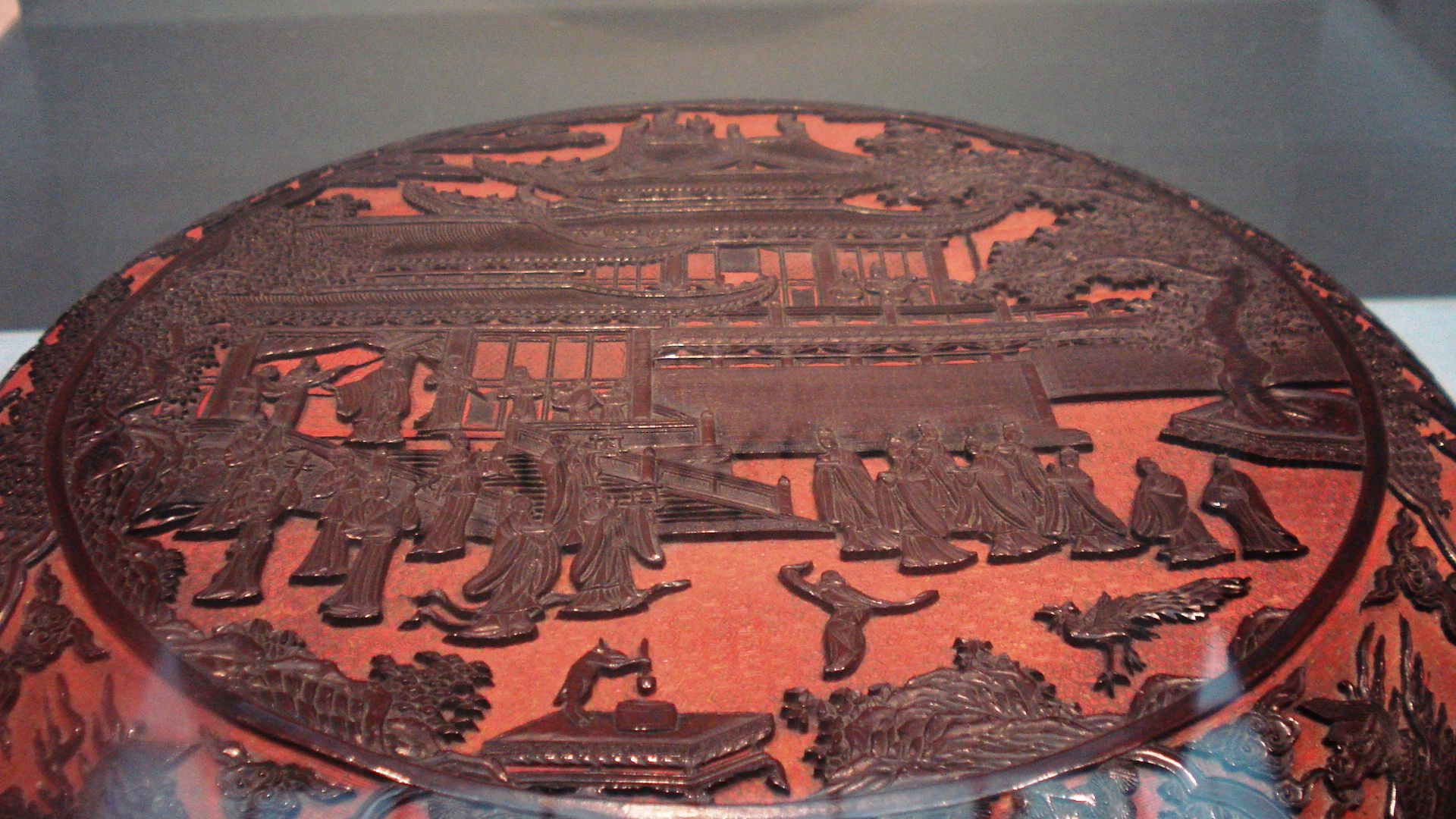
The palace of Chang'e, goddess of the moon, in black over red, 1490s

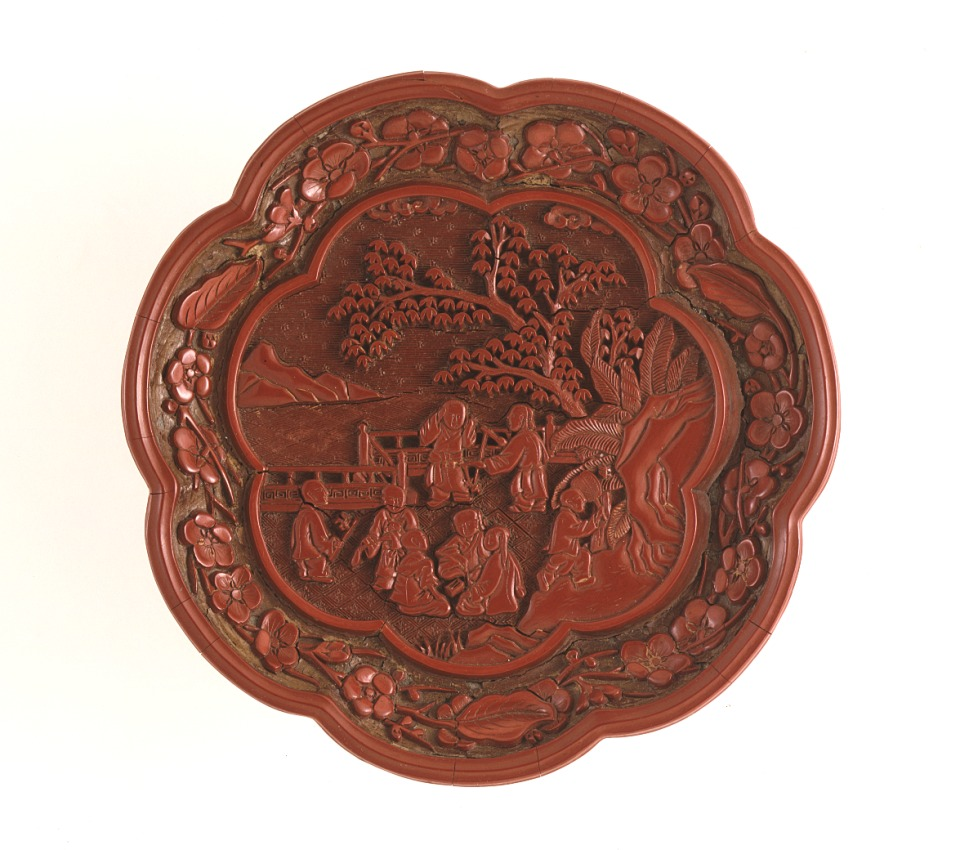
Pan (Dish) with Children Playing in a Garden, a popular subject. Ming, Yongle

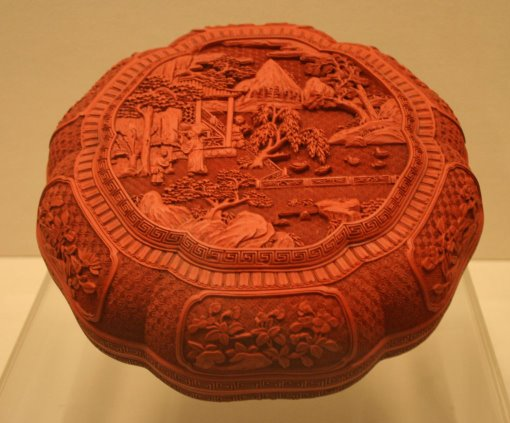
Qing "fruit box" with typical genre scene

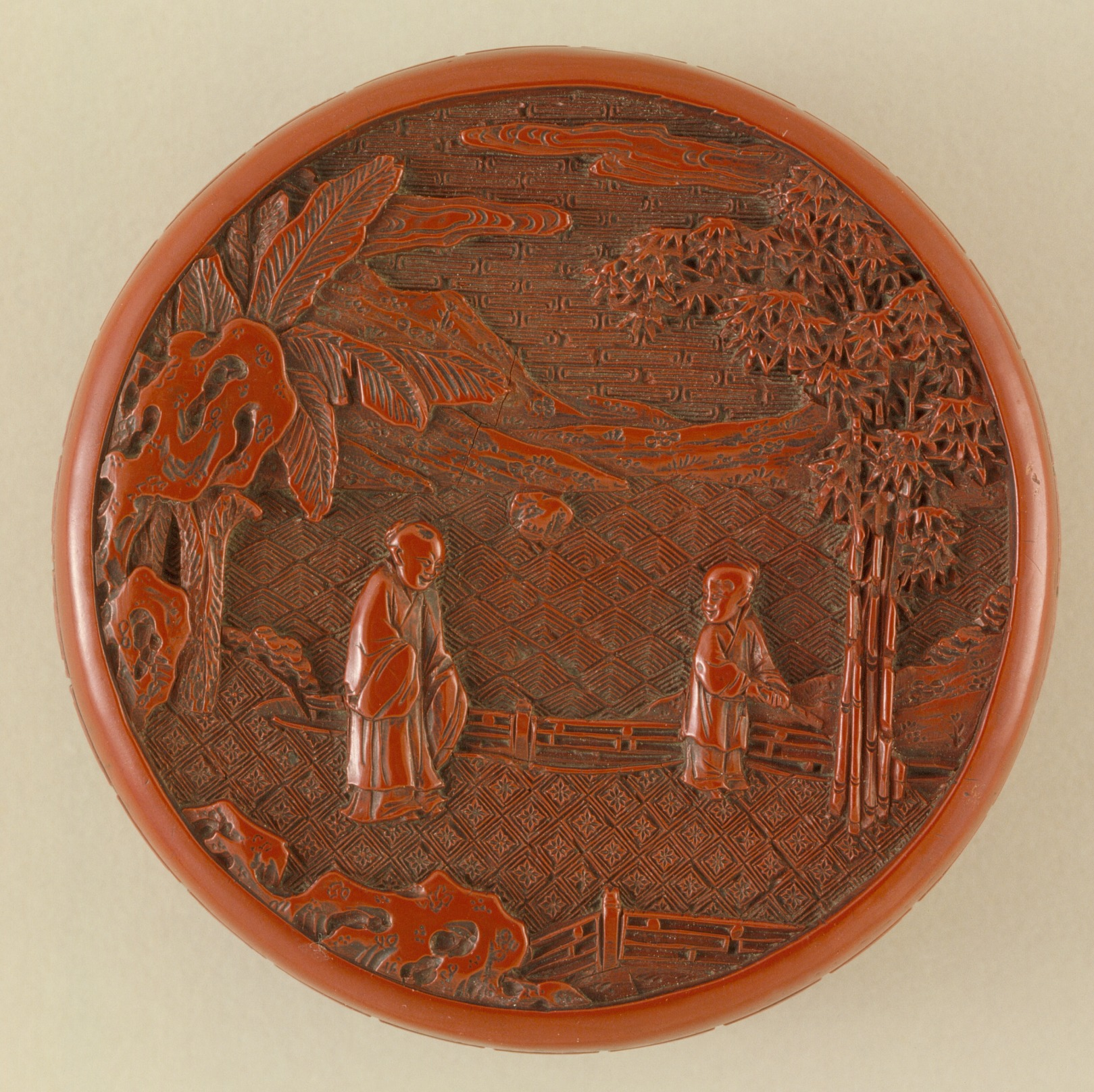
He (Small Box) with Elderly Woman and Young Boy Tending Bamboo in a Garden. Qing, Qianlong. Note the three kinds of brocade-ground.

=== Qing ===
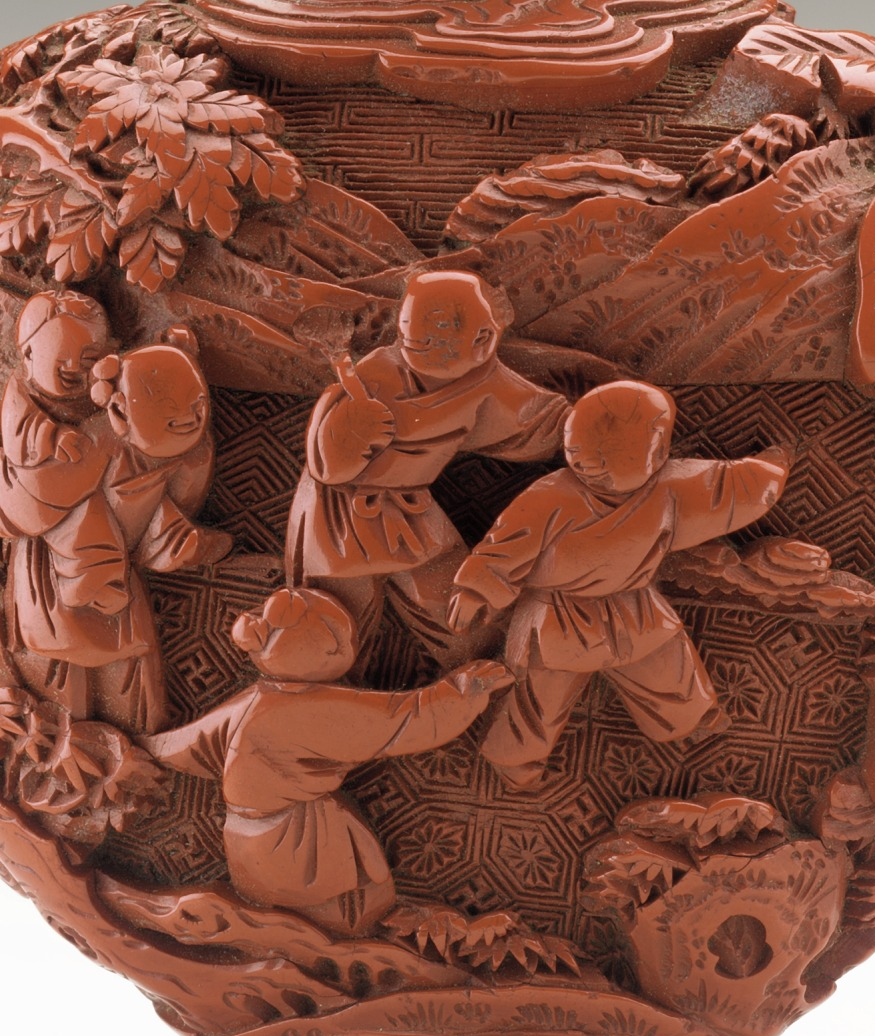
Detail of 18th-century snuff bottle with Children at Play, and three types of diaper background for ground, water and sky. The top layers are worn from use.

Another imperial factory was founded beside the Forbidden City in 1680 under the Qing dynasty by the Kangxi Emperor and was still producing under the Qianlong Emperor (1736–95), "one of the most prodigal spenders in Chinese history" and a great lover of carved lacquer. Referring to the traditional complaints, stretching back to the Han dynasty, about the cost to the imperial budget of "ordinary" lacquerware, he had a carved Ming piece in the imperial collection engraved with an inscription beginning "Lacquer is cause for ten officials to complain; what if it is also carved?".

A pair of vases, late Qing dynasty. Adilnor Collection, Sweden.

By the Qing period the repertoire of subjects for carved lacquer was essentially complete, but one addition in the Qianlong reign was a few pieces showing foreigners, mostly Central Asians bearing tribute though landscapes. Combination techniques of other techniques sometimes included carving, but more often slightly raised areas built up by applying fillers to the base surface before the lacquer was applied.

After the death of the Qianlong Emperor both the quality and quantity of imperial production sharply declined, and has never reached the previous standard again.

== Manufacturing process ==
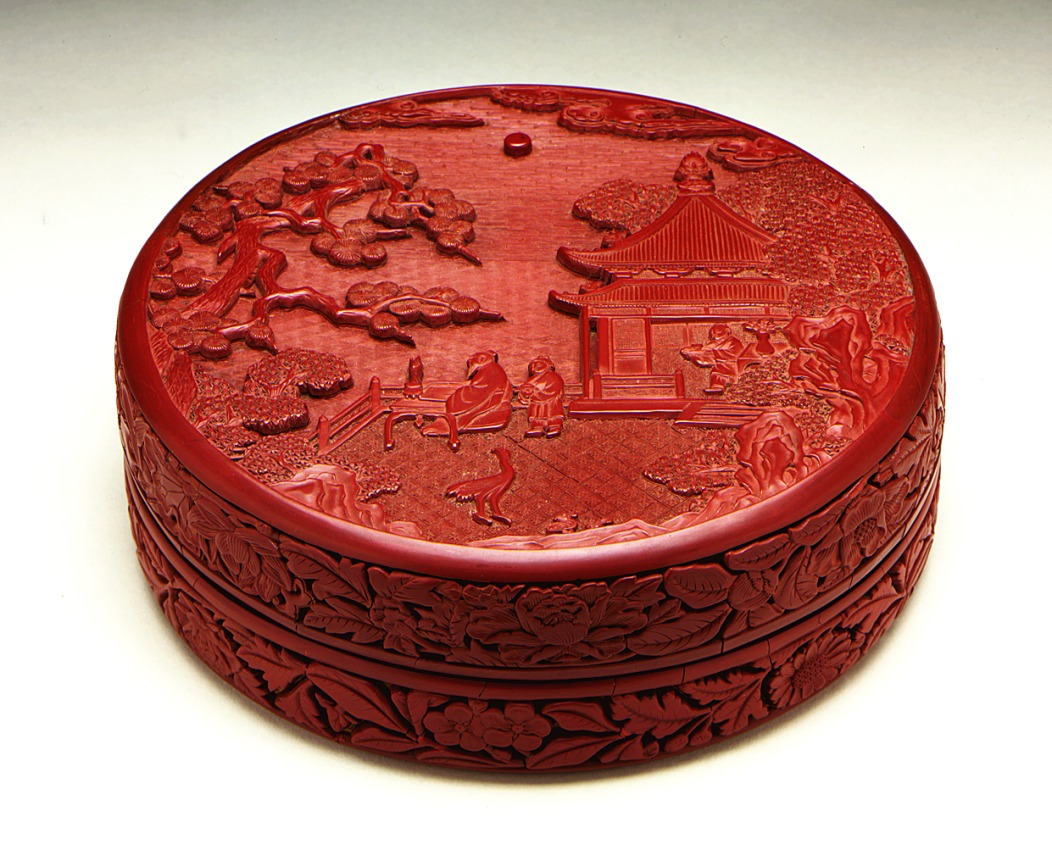
He (box) with a Scholar and Attendants in a Garden, Early Ming. About halfway-up a "horizon" can be seen as the diaper background pattern changes from water to sky.

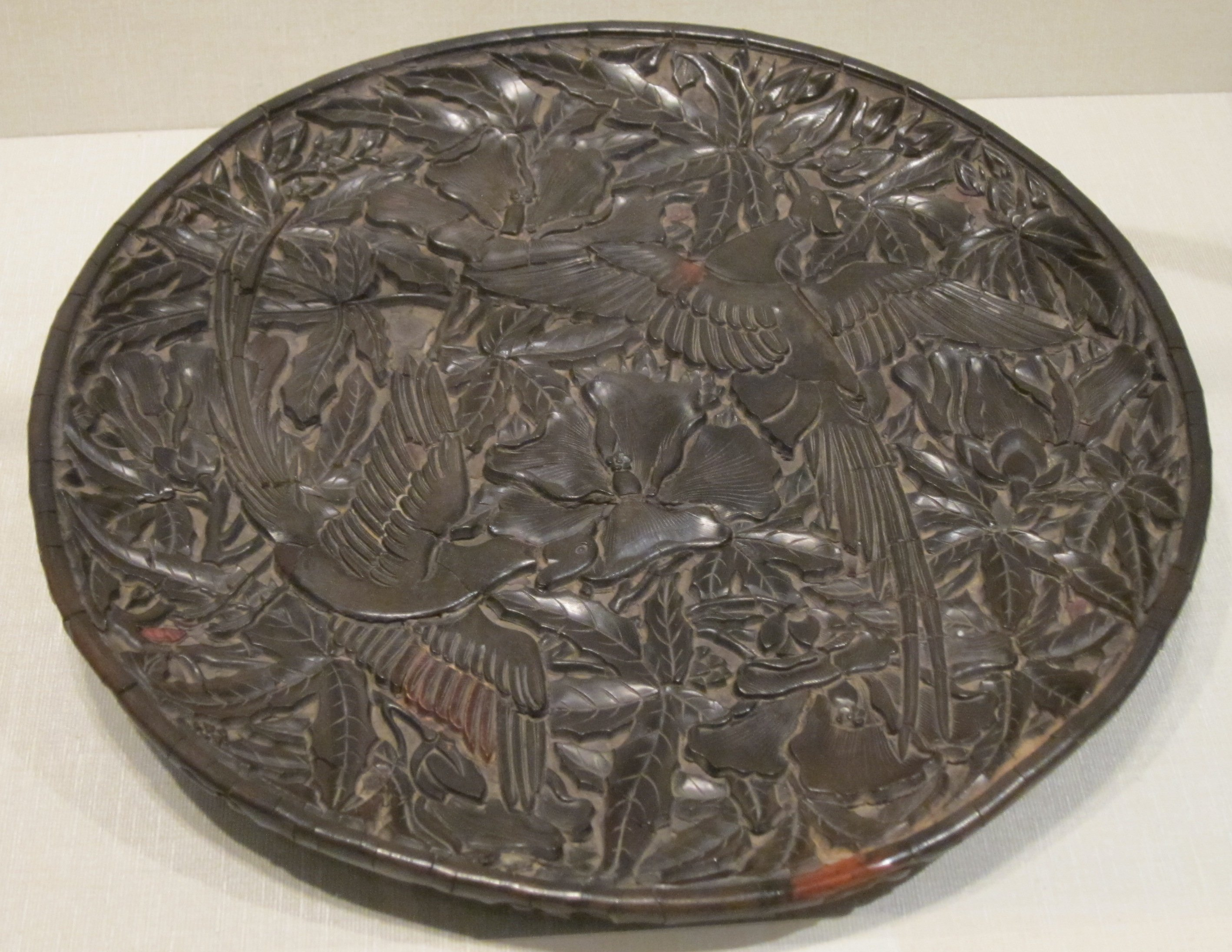
"Two birds" tray in black lacquer, Yuan (1260–1368)

The lacquer, sap from the Toxicodendron vernicifluum lacquer tree that is native to China, is mixed with colourings, with the usual colours being red from cinnabar, by far the most common, black from carbon (probably Chinese ink and soot), and a yellow or buff from orpiment, which is liable to fade to a dark colour and is often now hardly apparent. There appears to have been a change in the early Ming from using red from natural mineral cinnabar to synthetic vermilion. Some time after this, the colouring of the red changed from the previous brownish-red shade to a "bright scarlet", for reasons that remain unclear. The chemistry of other common pigments known to the Chinese at this period appears to have made them unsuitable for use in lacquer.

The base is usually of wood, though other materials may be used. Often the base of flatter pieces is made of two pieces of wood glued one on top of the other, with their grains running at right angles to each other. This helps the finished piece withstand stresses from different directions. Nonetheless, early pieces often show some warping and cracking. The wood was often covered with a glued-on coarse cloth made from ramie or hemp before the lacquer was applied.

The base is coated with a succession of coats or layers of lacquer, each of which must be allowed to dry and harden slowly in a warm temperature of 70 to 80 °F (21 to 27 °C) with high humidity (75% to 85%) before the next is applied. The drying time for each coat has been said to take weeks, "several days", 48 hours, or a day. It has been noted that "there is a great diversity in the literature .... about the numbers of layers involved. Estimates ...vary between a few and over 300". It is often stated that the number of coats in the best quality pieces reaches into the low hundreds, though it has also been said that microscopic examination of pieces does not support such high numbers,

The lacquer is then carved with knives and other metal tools. Usually the general large areas of the composition were carved down to the right level first, then the main forms followed by the details, and lastly the patterns in the backgrounds. Finally any polishing needed is done; the best pieces had also been polished after each coat was hard. Modern works often use a number of shortcuts, including starting with carving most of the design in relief on the base wood, so greatly reducing the depth of actual lacquer required (this has been also been done in the Japanese kamakura-bori technique since around the 15th century). Additives are also added in large amounts to the lacquer, or cast resin or other materials used instead.

Nowadays there are less than 20 diaoqi masters who can still perform the craft. Because of its endangered status, it has been listed as a Chinese intangible cultural heritage.

== Uses ==
Lacquerware has been described as "not unlike modern plastic in that it is light, durable and clean". Other types of lacquerware were widely used as tablewares, but the pictorial style of carved lacquer is less suitable for this, with intricate sunk corners that would be hard to clean of wet food remains. Partly for this reason, wide flattish shapes that are called dishes in other media, such as ceramics, tend to be rather more flat and to be called "trays" when in lacquer. Nonetheless, there is evidence that carved lacquer was used for serving food. Ming paintings of court scenes show food for "imperial picnics" being carried by court eunuchs in round lidded boxes in carved lacquer, a common shape that can reach nearly 40 cm across. The interior of these is almost always plain lacquer, greatly reducing the problem of keeping them clean, and the food itself may have been wrapped or in ceramic containers. A Yongle reign dish or tray 35 cm wide, probably made at the Orchard Factory and now in the British Museum, has a rare inscription indicating the use of the piece, as it declares it the property of the "Imperial Household Department of Sweetmeats and Delicacies".

Lacquer was more often used for cup-stands (or bowl-stands), a sort of saucer with an integral raised hollow tube at the centre to hold the cup, than actual cups, but sometimes the exterior of these is carved lacquer, especially in the guri style, while the interior lacquer is smooth. As in other materials, there is a considerable overlap between the pieces used for serving and drinking tea, wine, and other drinks.

Items for the scholar's desk, including brush pens with their matching covers, were often made in carved lacquer, as were those for the male and female toilet. The "Studio of the Three Rarities", the Qianlong Emperor's study in his main Beijing apartments, had an elaborate writing set in carved lacquer and other materials, including some of the visual tricks he enjoyed, such as a lacquer and ivory "book" that was actually a box containing his rhyming dictionary. Many smaller round boxes are described in the literature as "incense boxes", and a type of late Ming rectangular box with rounded corners was apparently mainly or initially used for the ceremonial presentation of documents or gifts.

Craig Clunas suggests that in looking at pictorial scenes, we should be alert to possible connections in what may seem general genre scenes to specific major life events, as such pieces were used and reused among the elite to carry and themselves to be gifts on such occasions as a marriage, birth of a child, birthday, passing the imperial examinations, moving house, promotion and retirement. Specific episodes from the history of famous literati or literature may be intended; in paintings such subjects are likely to be made clear by inscriptions, but not on lacquer. In addition to presentation pieces, boxes in all types of lacquer were used in elite society as containers to send gifts of food, where the recipient was intended, after admiring the container, to send it back containing another gift.

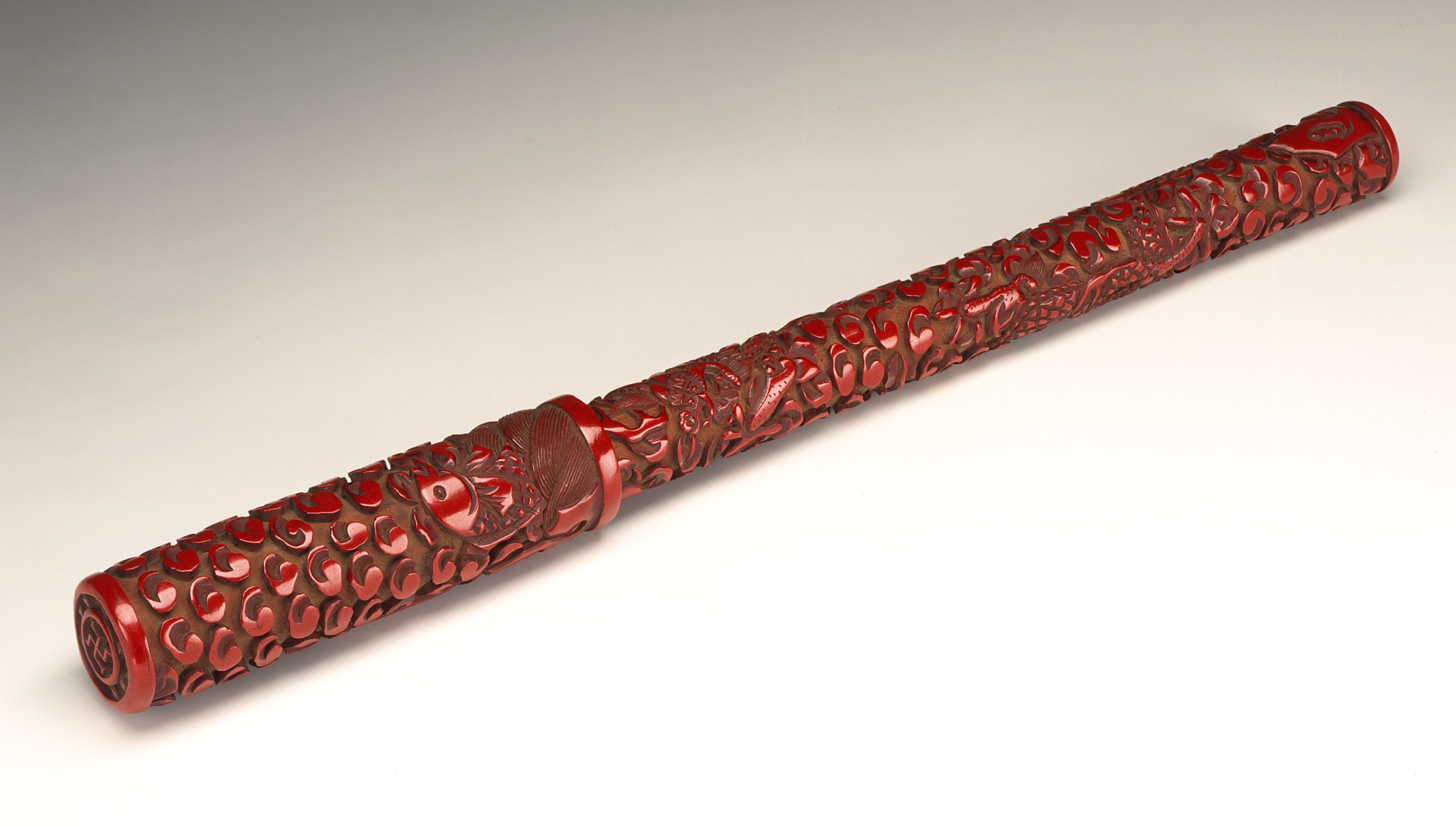
Bi (Writing brush) and cap with Carp and Dragon, Middle Ming

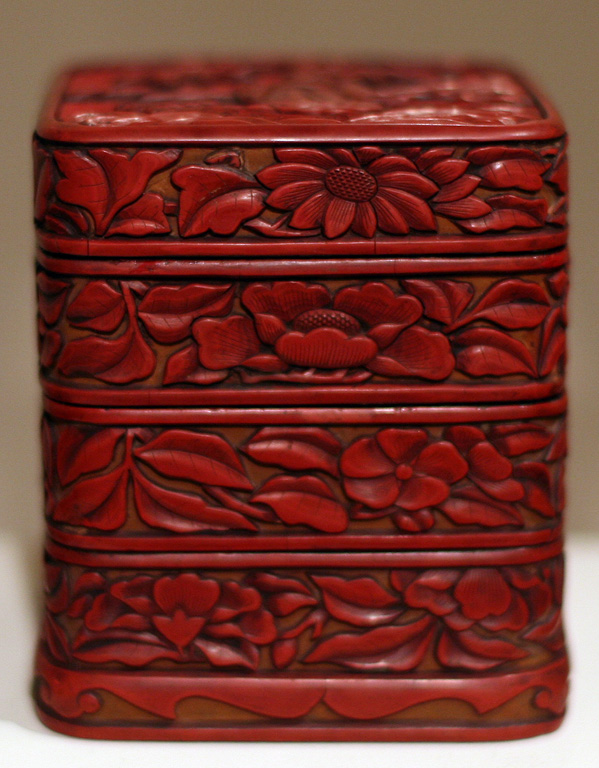
Box with four tiers, 15th century

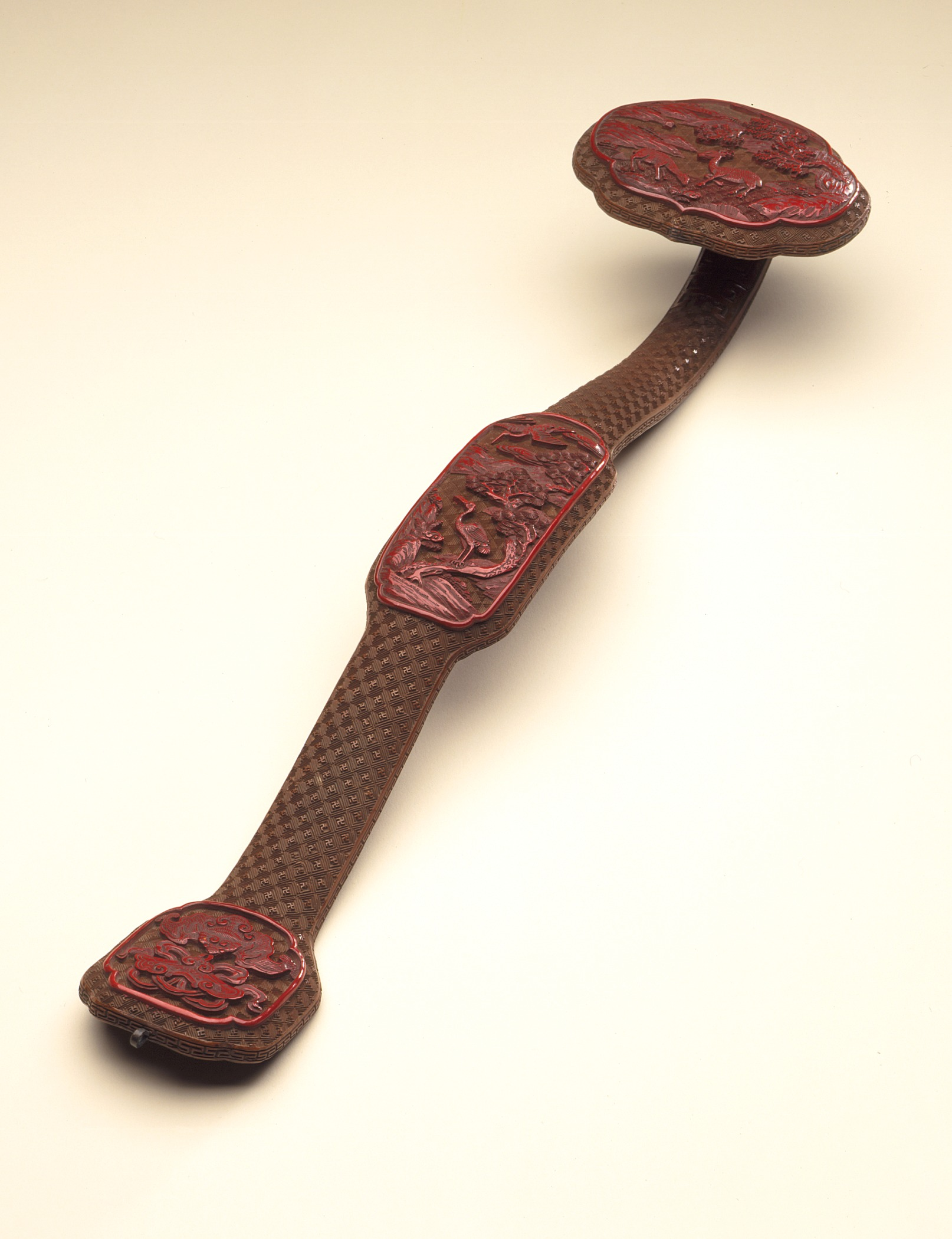
Ruyi (sceptre of office) with Deer, Cranes, and a Bat (and a swastika background pattern), Qing

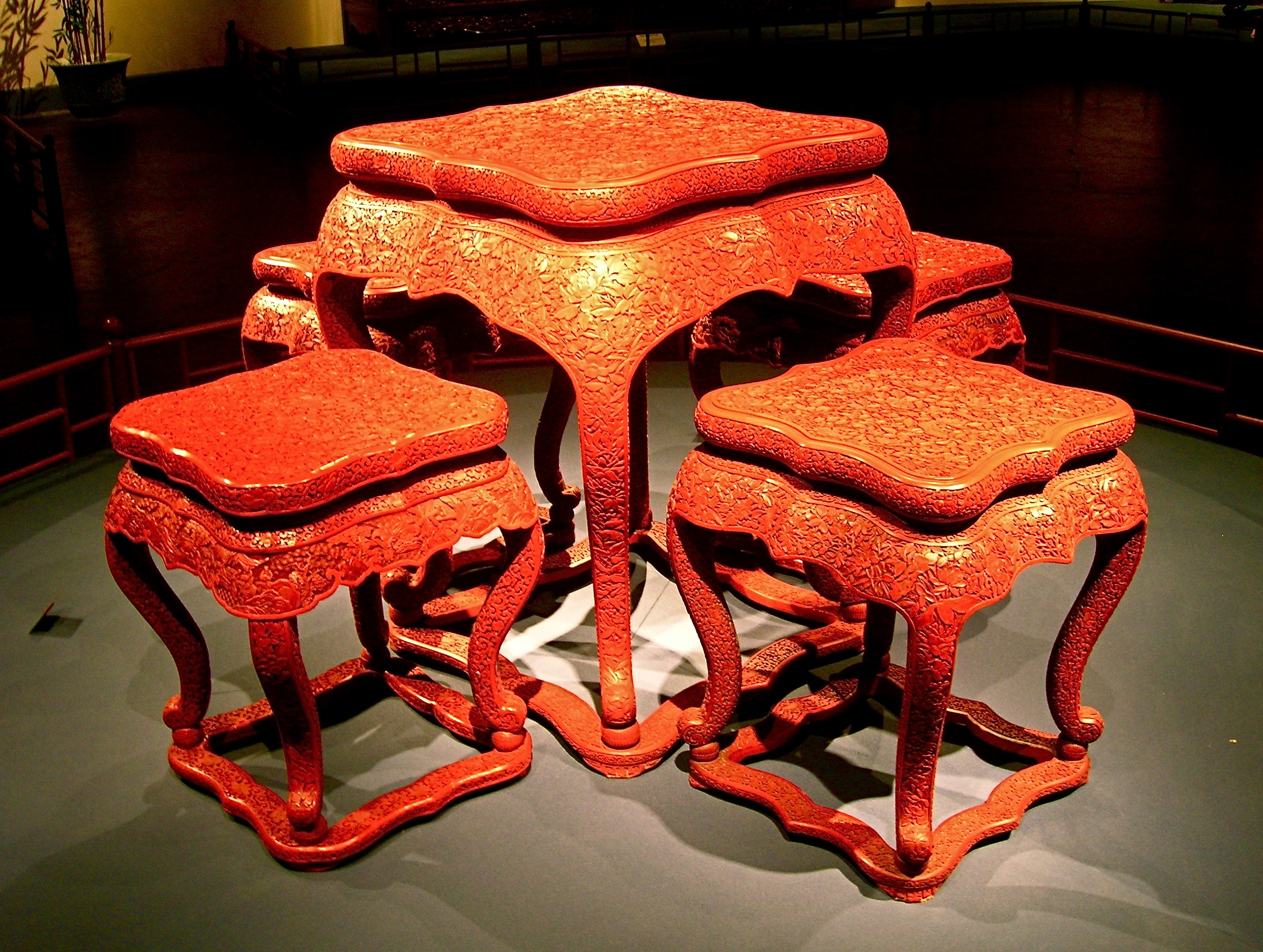
Table and chair set, Qing
