= Diapering =

Decorative pattern

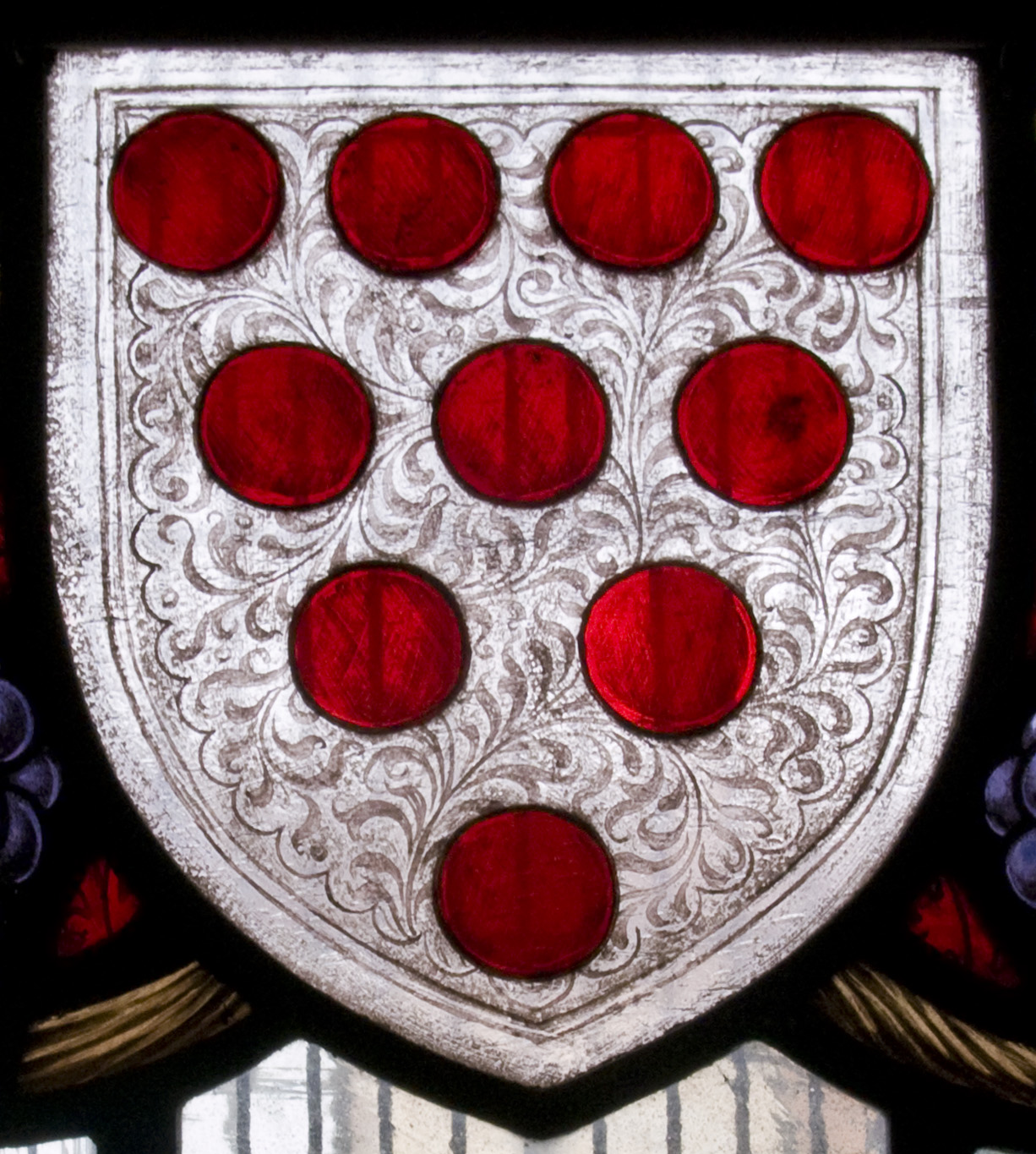
Arabesque-like diapering on the field of the shield of the See of Worcester: Argent, ten torteaux four, three, two, and one

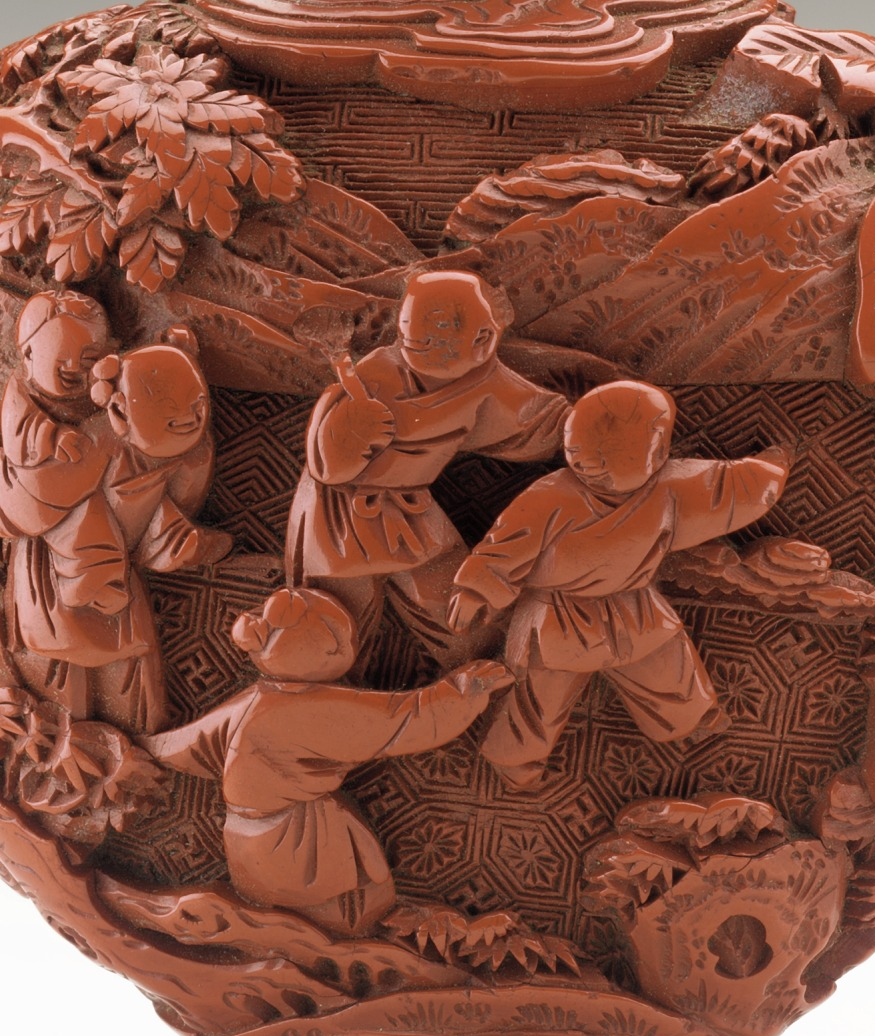
Detail of Chinese carved lacquer snuff bottle with Children at Play, and three types of diaper backgrounds, representing ground, water and sky. 18th century

Diaper is any of a wide range of decorative patterns used in a variety of works of art, such as stained glass, heraldic shields, architecture, and silverwork. Its chief use is in the enlivening of plain surfaces.

== Etymology ==
For the full etymology, see "diaper". The Oxford dictionary gives the Greek dia for "cross" as in "diamond" or "diagonal"; and aspros, Greek for "white". A white diamond or white cloth is used on the diagonal, hence the diagonal lattice or reticulation in patterning.

== In art ==
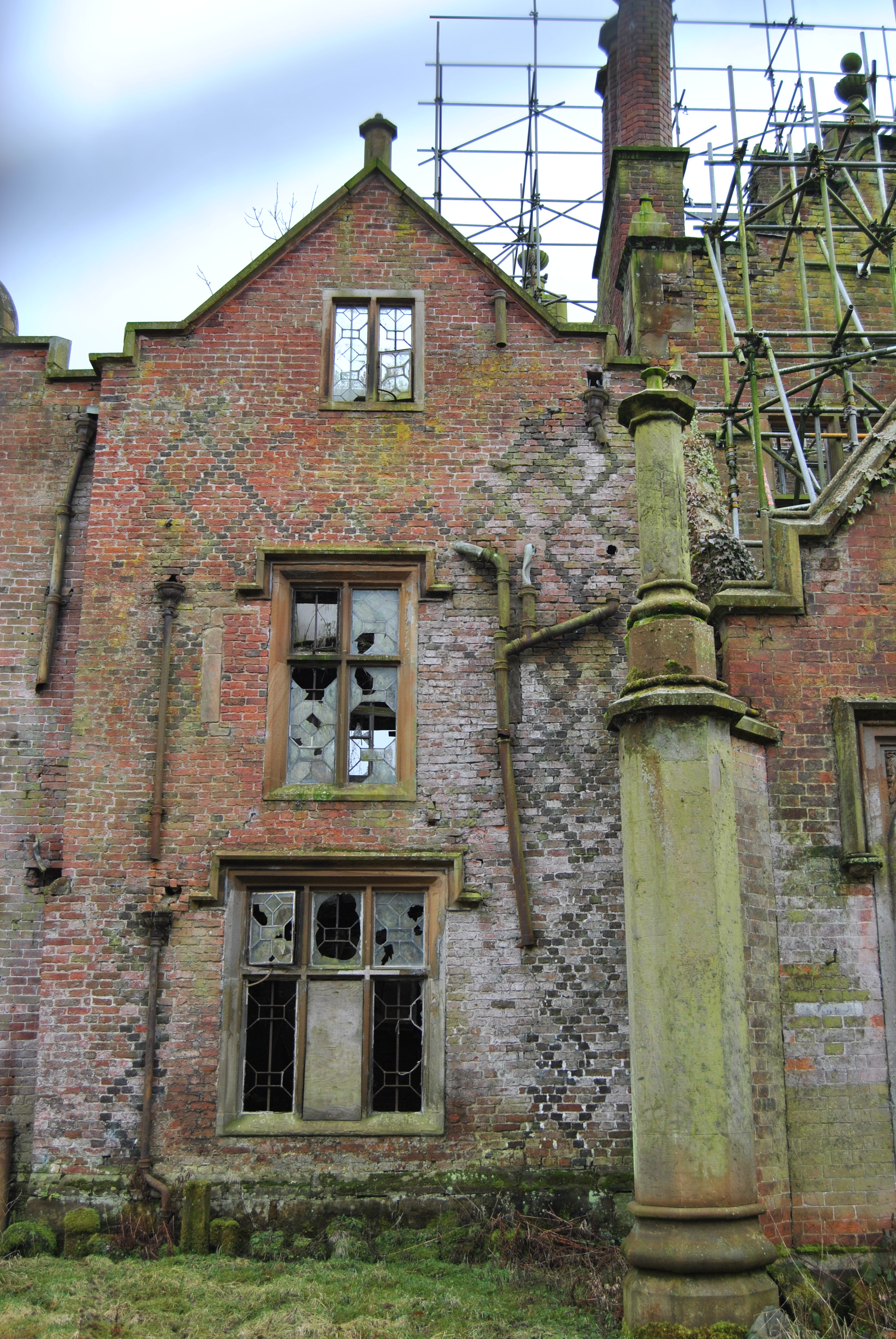
Diamond or lozenge pattern diaper work from 1608 on the walls of Bank Hall, Bretherton

In architecture and other decorative arts, diaper is applied as a decorative treatment of a surface with a repeat pattern of squares (chequers), rectangles, or lozenges. Diaper was particularly used in medieval stained glass to increase the vividness of a coloured pane, for example the field in a shield of arms. A stone wall may be decorated with such a pattern sculpted in relief; in brickwork the effect may be achieved by using bricks of different colours, or by allowing certain bricks to protrude from the wall's surface to create a regular diamond-shaped pattern. In English flushwork, limestone and dark knapped flint are used. Windows may be set in a diamond-shaped lattice. In the manuscripts the diapering was used as an alternative to the gold ground primarily from the late 13th to 15th century, eventually replaced by the landscape background.

In Chinese carved lacquer, a convention developed by which the areas of sky, water and floor or ground that would be left largely blank in paintings are filled in with discreet patterns derived from textiles, known as "diaper backgrounds" and also "brocade-grounds" (錦地 jǐndì, lit. ‘embroidery[-like] background’); this convention has continued to modern times. They are also used on porcelains, especially borders.

== Textiles ==
Diaper in textiles refers to richly decorated fabrics with a small geometrical or floral pattern that consists of the constant repetition of one or more simple figures or units of design evenly spaced. The term was initially associated with silk with diamond patterns later applied to linen and cotton fabrics of similar designs.

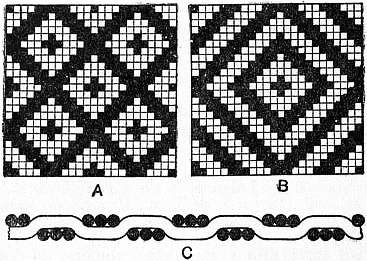
A diaper weave, that is a weave creating a diamond pattern in the cloth. Such cloth is quite absorbent and was therefore used for babies' nappies, also called diapers

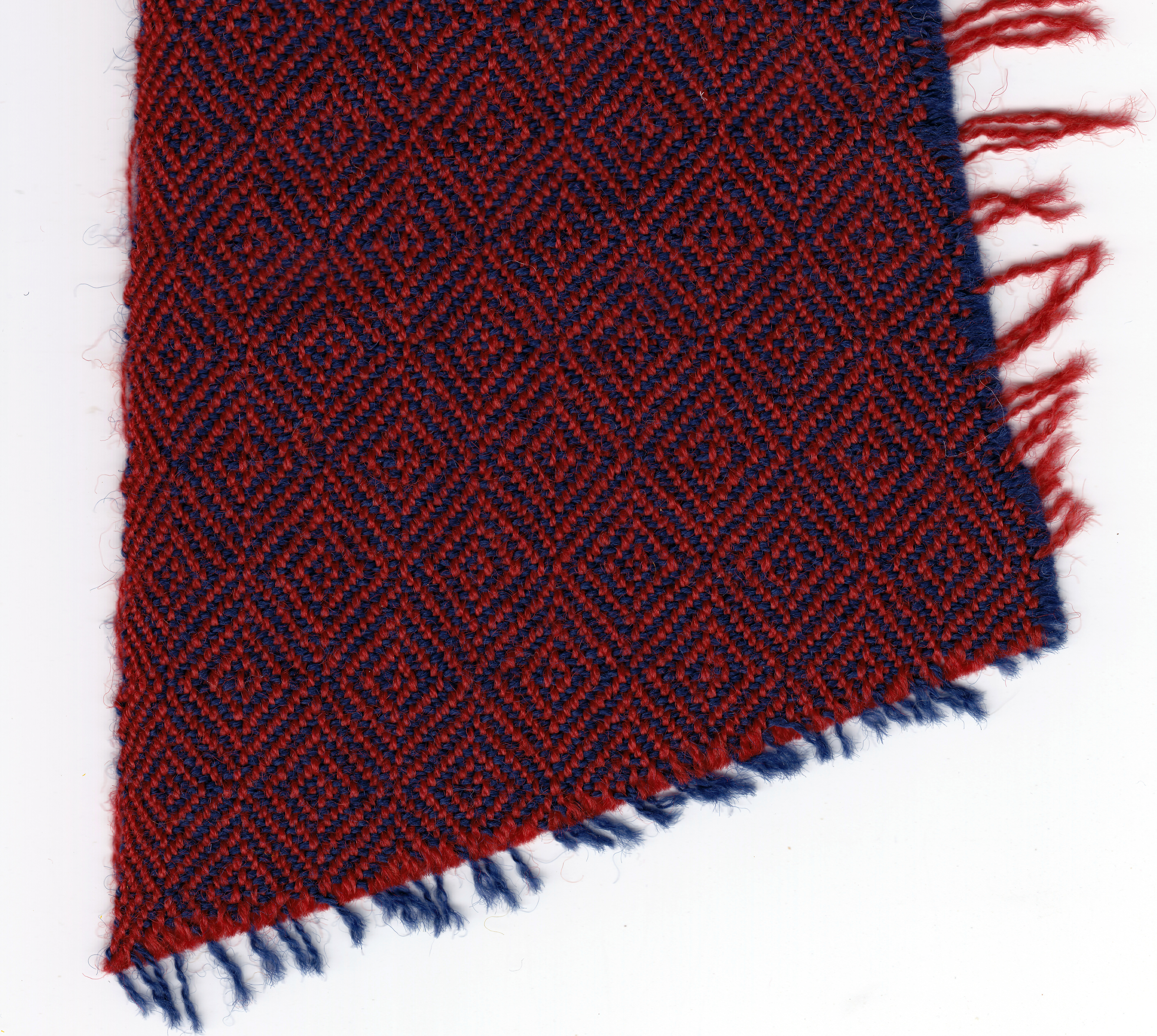
A similar weave, also called a diamond twill

== Heraldry ==
In heraldry, diapering is a technique in which those who emblazon, draw, paint, or otherwise depict achievements of arms decorate large areas of flat colour by drawing crosshatches or arabesques. There is no standard, and each artist is allowed individual idiosyncrasies.

=== Excluded from blazon ===
With very rare exceptions, diapering is not a part of the blazon, but is mere decoration, or ornamental accessory. Thus a shield with diapering is considered the same as a shield of the same design but without diapering. For this reason diapering must not be so obtrusive or so heavily drawn that it could be mistaken for a substantive charge or for a variation of the field. This is especially the case with diaper of simple cross-hatching which might be mistaken for a field of lozengy.

=== Exceptions ===
There are at least three Scots coats whose blazon includes diaper:

- Fulton of Lochliboside, Az. diapered or semy of fleurs de lys of the last, on a fess arg. two boar's heads erased of the field (Public Register vol 1, p 551, 1789);
- Fulton of Park of Inchinnan, a difference of the above, Az. diapered or semy of fleurs de lys of the last, on a fess arg. a boar's head erased of the field (Public Register vol 1. pp 550–1);
- Royal Burgh of Cullen, a 20th-century armorial: Per fess sable and argent, in chief on a sedilla or cushioned gules diapered or the Blessed Virgin enthroned proper habited gules mantled azure crowned or and holding in her dexter hand a sceptre surmounted of a fleur de lis or and in her sinister arm the Holy Child enhaloed also proper in base a talbot passant of the first (Public Register, vol 41, p 37, 1956).

== Examples ==
Arms of Percy, Beverley Minster, c.1350: A lion rampant. The diaper decoration of squared quatrefoils in the field has not been included in the blazon. Were the shield to show the tinctures, the blazon would be: Or, a lion rampant azure

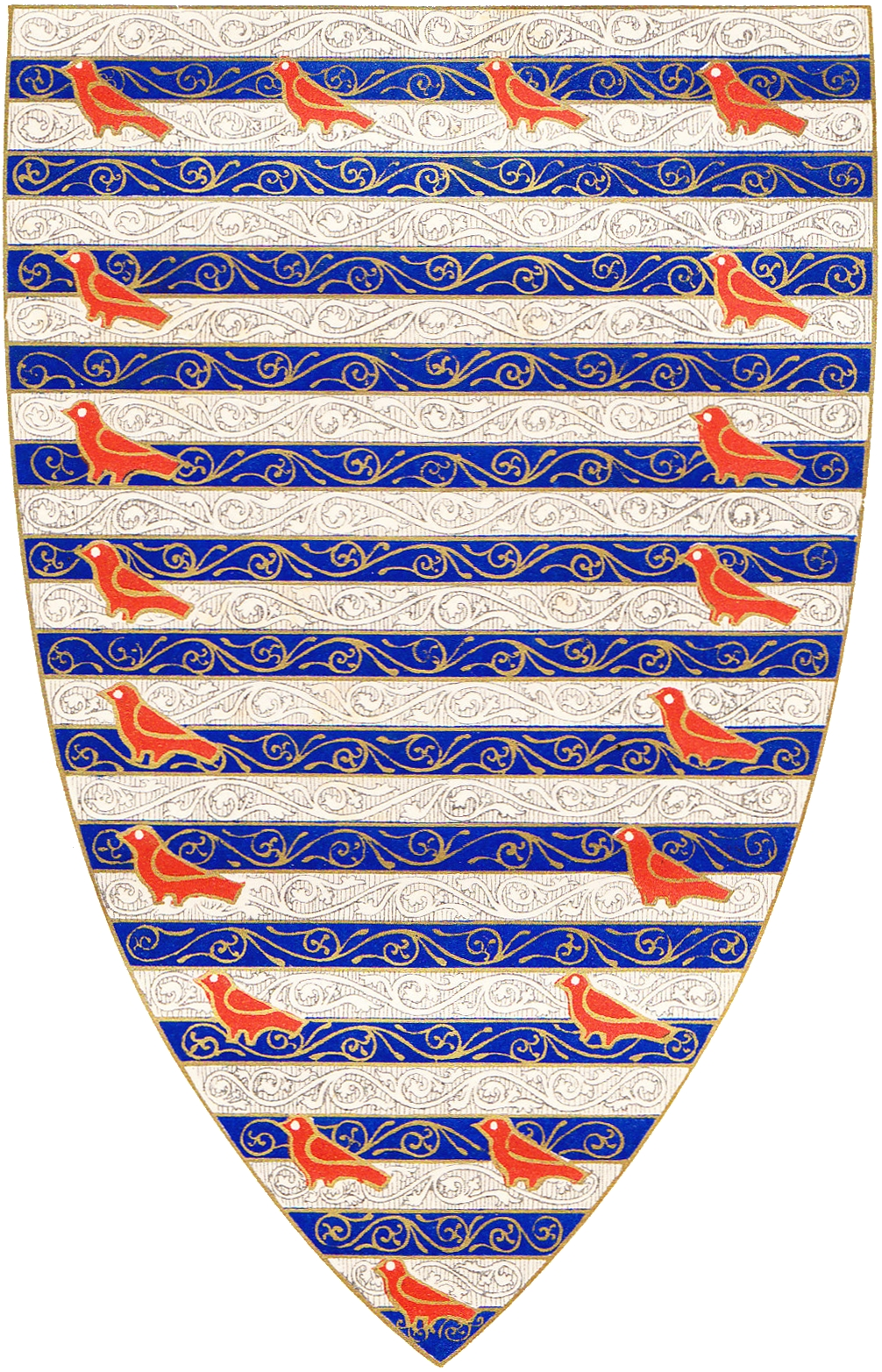
Arabesque diaper on the Heraldic shield of William de Valence, 1st Earl of Pembroke (d.1296) from his tomb in Westminster Abbey. Champlevé enamel

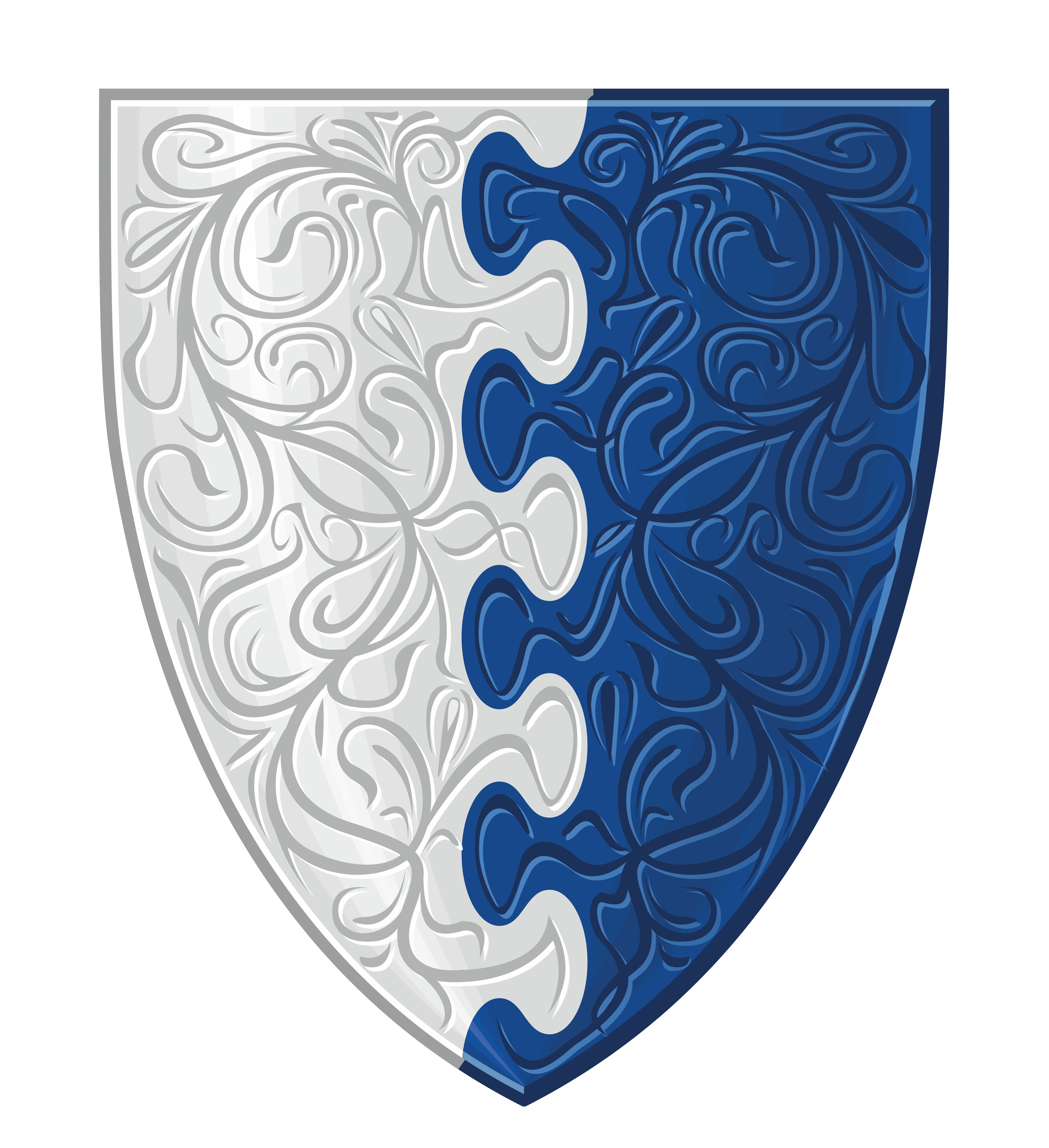
Diapering on the arms ("per pale nebuly argent and azure") as borne by the descendants of Rev. William Courtenay Thomas, himself an agnatic descendant of Sir William ap Thomas.

Plaster casts of 13th century diapering from Westminster Abbey (begun 1245).

Flushwork diapering on the end of the Guildhall, Norwich, 1407–12

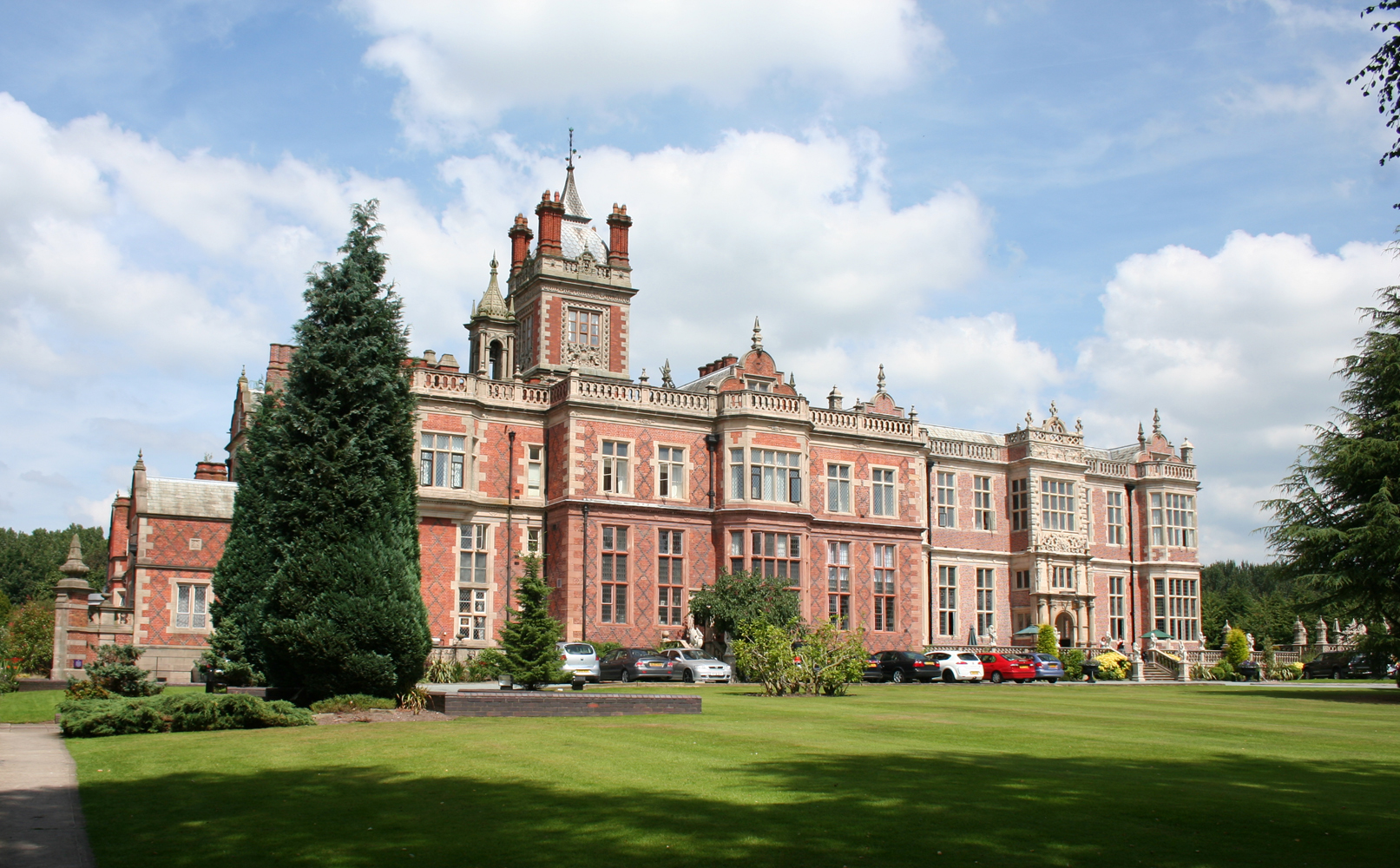
Diaper work at Crewe Hall, Cheshire built 1615–36

== See also ==
- Horror vacui

== Sources ==
- Osborne, Harold (1970). "Diaper". The Oxford Companion to Art. Oxford. p. 314. ISBN 0-19-866107-X.
