= Chinese lacquerware table =

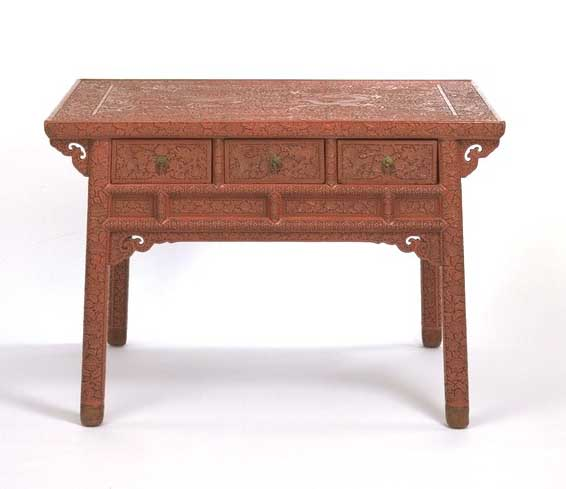
Chinese lacquerware table, 1425-1436 V&A Museum no. FE.6:1 to 4-1973

This carved lacquerware table in the Victoria and Albert Museum in London is from the Ming dynasty (1368–1644). It is unique in shape and decoration and is one of the most important objects from the period. It is one of the few surviving examples in the world of a major piece of furniture produced in the 'Orchard Workshop', the Imperial lacquer workshop set up in the early Ming period and situated to the north-west of the 'Forbidden City' compound in Peking (now Beijing).

By at least the Ming dynasty carved lacquer was being used all over the visible surfaces of pieces of furniture, a dauntingly expensive proposition. One of the best known pieces is this table, with three drawers, whose top has a typical imperial Ming design with a central dragon and phoenix, symbolizing the emperor and empress respectively; the pair also appear on the drawer-fronts. The table-top measures 119.5 by 84.5 cm (47.0 by 33.3 in) and the table is 79.2 cm (31.2 in) high. It was produced between 1425–1436 in the "Orchard Factory", and is the only piece of its size to survive from their production, the best period of Ming workmanship. As with many other pieces, the ground of the table-top relief was originally a yellow that contrasted with the red of the upper layers, but has now faded to a dark colour.

The legs and edges of the top are carved with the "Flowers of the Four Seasons". The insides of the drawers are in plain red lacquer, and the outsides and underside of the table in black lacquer. The table bears the mark of the reign of the Xuande Emperor (1426–1435) and was probably made to stand in an Imperial Palace. An Imperial provenance is also suggested by the five-clawed dragons carved on the surface, each of which has been mutilated by the removal of one claw on each foot, as was often done when pieces left imperial ownership. The five-clawed dragon was only allowed to be used by the emperor, with very severe penalties for abuse, but imperial pieces were sometimes given as gifts, or pilfered by the court eunuchs to be sold at a notorious market outside the northern gate of the Forbidden City.

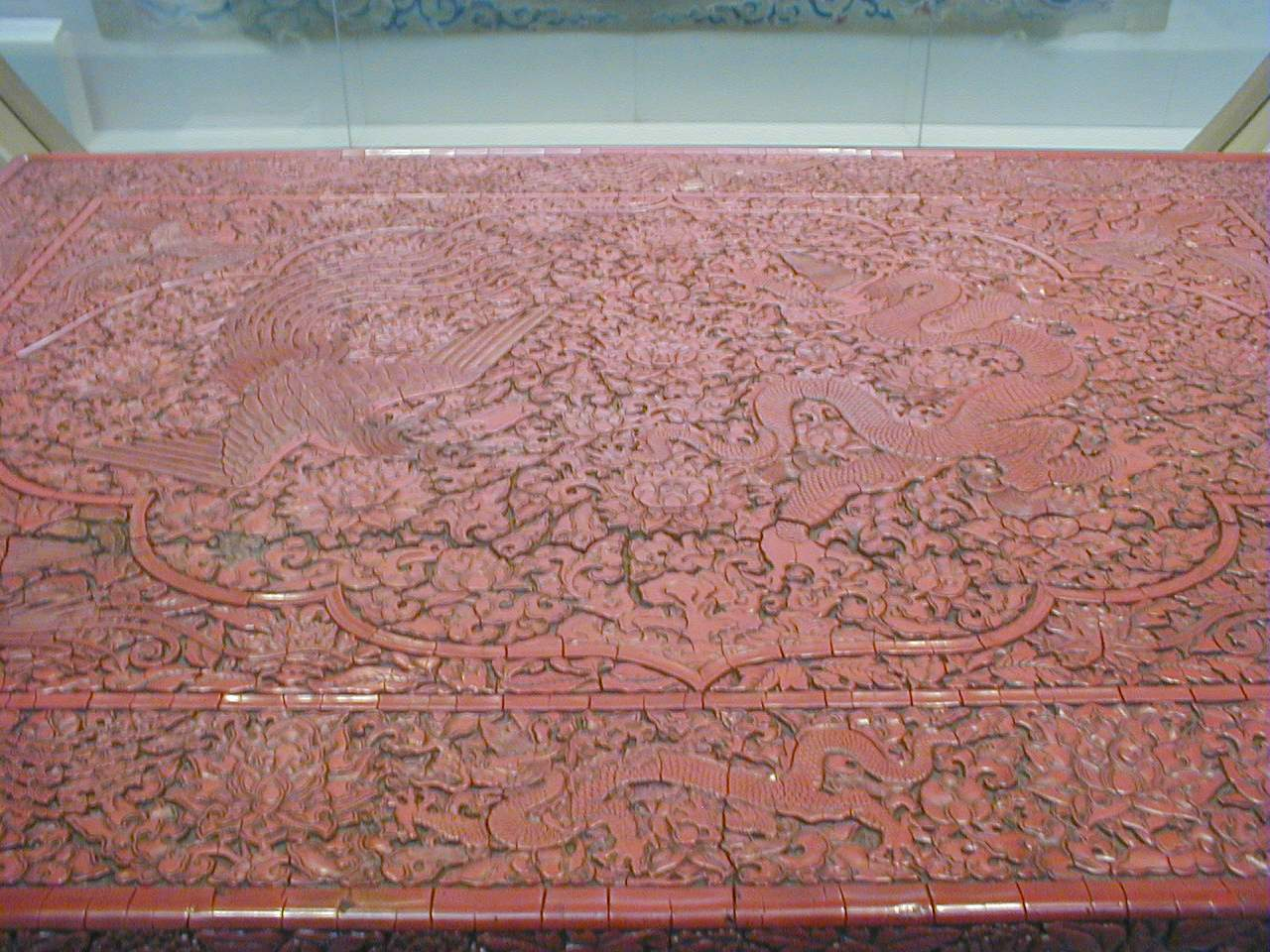
The table top

In the Ming period the dragon became a key imperial symbol, very often appearing on lacquer from the imperial workshops for the use of the court, or made to be given by the emperor. Initially the dragon's head was seen in the traditional profile, as here, but in the middle of the 15th century the "frontal" dragon, seen looking out full-face at the viewer, was introduced and soon became the norm in lacquer as in other media.

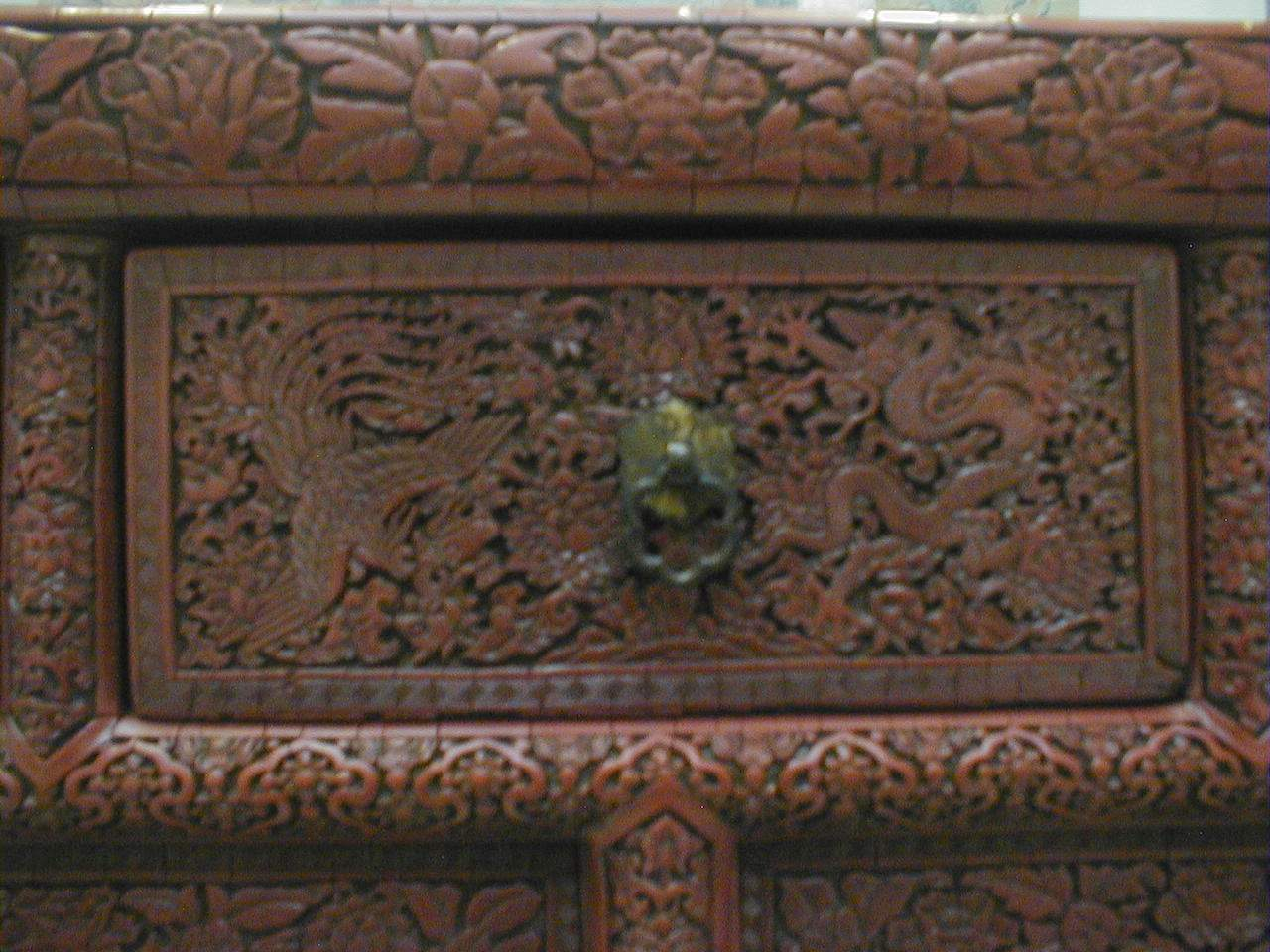
Detail of a drawer

The table was lent to the British Museum's 2014 exhibition Ming, 50 years that changed China.
