= Kamakura-bori =

Form of Japanese lacquerware

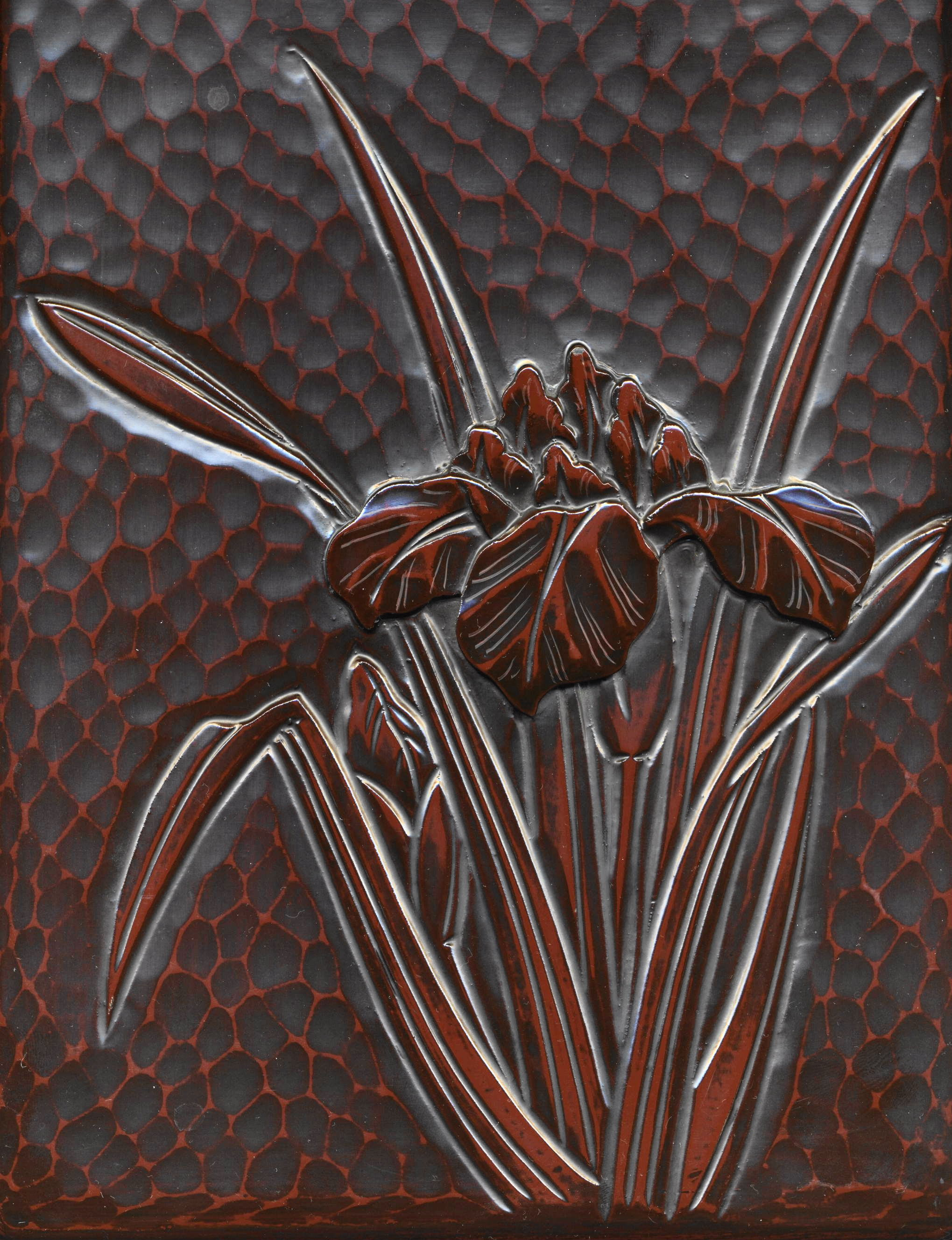
An example of Kamakura-bori

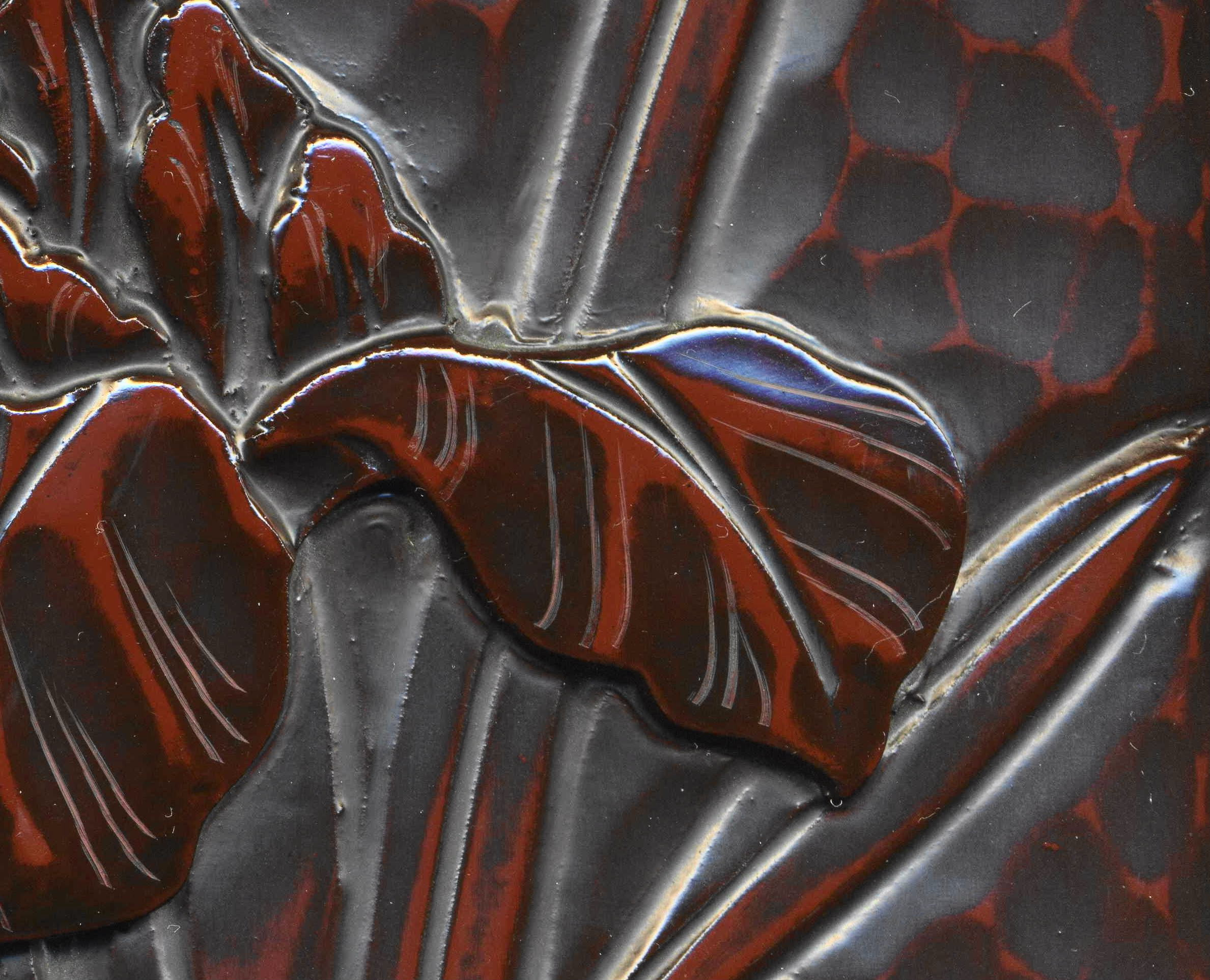
Enlargement showing how polishing reveals layers

Kamakura-bori (鎌倉彫) is a form of lacquerware from Kamakura, Japan. It is made by carving patterns in wood, then lacquering it with layers of color. It is then polished.

In the Kamakura period (1185 –1333), carved lacquer from the Song dynasty of China was imported to Japan by Chin Na-kei (or Chin Wa-kei). However, many Japanese lacquer craftsmen did not adopt the Chinese method of depositing lacquer and then carving it; instead, they created Kamakura-bori, a method of carving wood and then coating lacquer. Kamakura-bori is a technique invented by Kōun (康運) or Kōen (康円), who were busshi (sculptors of Buddhist statues), in order to mass-produce Buddhist altar fittings resembling carved lacquer in a short period of time.

Kamakura-bori was widely used as a box, stand or plate for daily necessities, Buddhist altar fittings and tea utensils.
