= Ski jumping at the Winter World University Games =

- Events: 10 (men: 5; women: 5)

Games
- 1959; 1960; 1961; 1962; 1963; 1964; 1965; 1966; 1967; 1968; 1970; 1970; 1973; 1972; 1975; 1975; 1977; 1978; 1979; 1981; 1983; 1985; 1987; 1989; 1991; 1993; 1995; 1997; 1999; 2001; 2003; 2005; 2007; 2009; 2011; 2013; 2015; 2017; 2019; 2023; 2025

Ski jumping events have been contested at the Universiade since 1960.

== Events ==
Event	60	62	64	66	68	70	72	78	83	85	87	89	91	93	95	97	99	01	03	05	07	09	11	13	15	17	Years
Men's normal hill	•	•	•	•	•	•	•	•	•	•	•	•	•	•	•	•	•	•	•	•	•	•	•	•	•	•	26
Men's large hill													•	•		•	•	•	•	•	•	•	•	•			11
Men's normal hill team											•	•	•	•	•	•	•	•	•	•	•	•	•	•	•	•	16
Women's normal hill																				•	•	•	•	•	•	•	7
Women's team																									•	•	2
Mixed team																								•	•	•	3

== Medalists ==
=== Men ===
==== Normal hill ====
Year	Gold	Silver	Bronze
1960	(Soviet Union) Albert Larionov	(Czechoslovakia) Jaromír Nevlud	(Socialist Federal Republic of Yugoslavia) Milan Rojina
1962	(Japan) Shigeyuki Wasaka	(Japan) Yosuke Eto	(Japan) Renzo Nigawara
1964	(Austria) Baldur Preiml	(Soviet Union) Yury Zubarev	(Poland) Andrzej Szfolt
1966	(Japan) Yukio Kasaya	(Poland) Andrzej Szfolt	(Japan) Takashi Fujisawa
1968	(Japan) Hiroshi Itagaki	(Japan) Masakatsu Asari	(Japan) Yukio Kasawa
1970	(Soviet Union) Gariy Napalkov	(Soviet Union) Alexander Ivannikov	(East Germany) Rainer Schmidt
1972	(Japan) Hideki Nakano	(Soviet Union) Gariy Napalkov	(Soviet Union) Yuriy Kalinin
1975	not included in the program		
1978	(Soviet Union) Sergey Suslikov	(Czechoslovakia) František Novák	(Soviet Union) Sergey Mukhin
1981	(Italy) Massimo Rigoni	(Italy) Lido Tomasi	(United States) Mark Konopacke
1983	(Soviet Union) Gennady Prokopenko	(Socialist Federal Republic of Yugoslavia) Primoz Ulaga	(Italy) Sandro Sambugaro
1985	(Czechoslovakia) Jiří Malec	(Czechoslovakia) Ivan Šindler	(East Germany) Ingo Lesser
1987	(Czechoslovakia) Peter Číž	(Czechoslovakia) Jiří Malec	(East Germany) Ingo Lesser (Czechoslovakia) František Vavrinčík
1989	(East Germany) Heiko Hunger	(Poland) Jarosław Mądry	(United States) Mark Konopacke
1991	(Japan) Naoto Ito	(Czechoslovakia) Vladimír Podzimek	(Socialist Federal Republic of Yugoslavia) Janez Debelak
1993	(Japan) Naoto Ito	(Poland) Bartłomiej Gąsiennica-Sieczka	(Japan) Mitsuhiro Suzuki
1995	(Japan) Yukitaka Fukita	(Slovenia) Franci Petek	(Japan) Hiroki Vesugi
1997	(Poland) Łukasz Kruczek	(Japan) Yoshiharu Ikeda	(Austria) Gerhard Schallert
1999	(Austria) Fabian Ebenhoch	(Poland) Łukasz Kruczek	(Japan) Yoshiharu Ikeda
2001	(Poland) Łukasz Kruczek	(South Korea) Choi Heungchul	(Russia) Artur Khamidullin
2003	(South Korea) Kang Chilgu	(Austria) Reinhard Schwarzenberger	(Poland) Krystian Długopolski
2005	(Austria) Manuel Fettner	(Austria) Reinhard Schwarzenberger	(Slovenia) Nejc Frank
2007	(Russia) Dmitry Ipatov	(South Korea) Choi Yongjik	(Russia) Denis Kornilov
2009	(South Korea) Kim Hyunki	(Poland) Marcin Bachleda	(Austria) Bastian Kaltenboeck
2011	(Slovenia) Matej Dobovsek	(Poland) Maciej Kot	(Slovenia) Ziga Mandl
2013	(Finland) Sami Niemi	(Poland) Krzysztof Biegun	(Russia) Mikhail Maksimochkin
2015	(Bulgaria) Vladimir Zografski	(Russia) Ilmir Hazetdinov	(Russia) Evgeniy Klimov
2017	(Japan) Naoki Nakamura	(Russia) Mikhail Maksimochkin	(Austria) Thomas Lackner
2023	(Kazakhstan) Danil Vassilyev	(Austria) Maximilian Lienher	(Austria) Timon Kahofer

==== Large hill ====
Year	Gold	Silver	Bronze
1960-1989	not included in the program		
1991	(Japan) Naoto Ito	(Czechoslovakia) Vladimír Podzimek	(Japan) Takayuki Sazaki
1993	(Japan) Yukitaka Fukita	(Austria) Alexander Diess	(Austria) Franz Wiegele
1995	not included in the program		
1997	(Japan) Yoshiharu Ikeda	(Austria) Alexander Pointner	(Japan) Yusuke Kaneko
1999	(Belarus) Siarhei Babrou	(Japan) Shinichiro Saito	(Japan) Yusuke Kaneko
2001	(Poland) Łukasz Kruczek	(Austria) Karlheinz Dorner	(Czech Republic) Vlastibor Sedlák
2003	(Slovenia) Jernej Damjan	(South Korea) Kang Chilgu	(Finland) Lassi Huuskonen
2005	(Austria) Manuel Fettner	(Austria) Florian Liegl	(Austria) Martin Koch
2007	(Russia) Denis Kornilov	(Japan) Yoshihiro Osanai	(Russia) Dmitry Ipatov
2009	(Austria) David Unterberger	(South Korea) Kim Hyunki	(South Korea) Choi Heungchul
2011	(Slovenia) Matej Dobovsek	(Poland) Maciej Kot	(Slovenia) Ziga Mandl
2013	(Poland) Krzysztof Biegun	(Finland) Sami Niemi	(Japan) Junshiro Kobayashi
2015-2023	not included in the program		

==== Normal hill team ====
Year	Gold	Silver	Bronze
1960-1985	not included in the program		
1987	Czechoslovakia	East Germany	(Socialist Federal Republic of Yugoslavia) Yugoslavia
1989	East Germany	United States	Japan
1991	Japan	Soviet Union	Austria
1993	Austria	Japan	Poland
1995	Austria	Japan	Slovenia
1997	Japan	Austria	Slovenia
1999	Japan	Austria	Russia
2001	Slovenia	South Korea	Finland
2003	South Korea	Slovenia	Poland
2005	Slovenia	Poland	Austria
2007	Austria	South Korea	Japan
2009	South Korea	Austria	Germany
2011	Japan; Shōtarō Hosoda; Yūmu Harada; Shō Suzuki	Slovenia; Rok Mandl; Matej Dobovšek; Žiga Mandl	Poland; Jakub Kot; Wojciech Gąsienica-Kotelnicki; Maciej Kot
2013	Poland; Aleksander Zniszczoł; Bartłomiej Kłusek; Krzysztof Biegun	Russia; Roman Trofimov; Aleksandr Sardyko; Mikhail Maksimochkin	Austria; Daniel Huber; David Unterberger; Clemens Aigner
2015	Russia; Evgeniy Klimov; Mikhail Maksimochkin; Ilmir Hazetdinov	Japan; Kanta Takanashi; Minato Mabuchi; Junshiro Kobayashi	Poland; Andrzej Zapotoczny; Stanisław Biela; Jakub Kot
2017	Russia; Aleksandr Bazhenov; Roman Trofimov; Mikhail Maksimochkin	Slovenia; Anže Lavtižar; Andraž Modic; Aljaž Vodan	Poland; Krzysztof Miętus; Stanisław Biela; Przemysław Kantyka
2023	(Austria) Austria; Maximilian Lienher; Timon Kahofer	Kazakhstan; Sergey Tkachenko; Danil Vassilyev	Japan; Sakutaro Kobayashi; Ryusei Ikeda

=== Women ===
==== Normal hill ====
Year	Gold	Silver	Bronze
1960-2003	not included in the program		
2005	(Austria) Daniela Iraschko	(Slovenia) Monika Pogladic	(Japan) Seiko Koasa
2007	(Austria) Daniela Iraschko	(Japan) Misaki Shigeno	(Japan) Erina Kabe
2009	(Japan) Misaki Shigeno	(Japan) Natsuka Sawaya	(China) Li Zhenhuan
2011	(Italy) Elena Runggaldier	(Japan) Yurika Hirayama	(Italy) Lisa Demetz
2013	(Slovenia) Katja Požun	(Czech Republic) Michaela Doleželová	(Russia) Irina Avvakumova
2015	(Russia) Irina Avvakumova	(Japan) Yuka Kobayashi	(Russia) Anastasiya Gladysheva
2017	(Japan) Haruka Iwasa	(Japan) Yuka Kobayashi	(Czech Republic) Marta Křepelková
2023	(Poland) Nicole Konderla	(Japan) Machiko Kubota	(Poland) Kinga Rajda

==== Normal hill team ====
Year	Gold	Silver	Bronze
1960-2013	not included in the program		
2015	Russia; Anastasiya Gladysheva; Irina Avvakumova	Japan; Yuka Kobayashi; Aki Matsuhashi	Czech Republic; Vladěna Pustková; Michaela Doleželová
2017	Japan; Yuka Kobayashi; Haruka Iwasa	Czech Republic; Karolína Indráčková; Marta Křepelková	Russia; Stefaniya Nadymova; Alena Sutiagina
2023	Poland I Kinga Rajda; Nicole Konderla	Poland II; Anna Twardosz; Paulina Cieślar	Japan I Miki Ikeda; Machiko Kubota

=== Mixed ===
==== Team ====
Year	Gold	Silver	Bronze
1960-2011	not included in the program		
2013	Russia; Irina Avvakumova; Mikhail Maksimochkin	Finland; Julia Kykkänen; Sami Niemi	Slovenia; Katja Požun; Mitja Mežnar
2015	Japan; Yuka Kobayashi; Junshiro Kobayashi	Russia; Anastasiya Gladysheva; Mikhail Maksimochkin	Japan II; Aki Matsuhashi; Kanta Takanshi
2017	Japan I Haruka Iwasa; Naoki Nakamura	Czech Republic I Marta Křepelková; Čestmír Kožíšek	Japan II; Yuka Kobayashi; Max Koga
2023	Poland I Adam Niżnik; Nicole Konderla	Japan I Ryusei Ikeda; Machiko Kubota	Poland II; Szymon Jojko; Kinga Rajda

== Medal table ==
Last updated after the 2023 Winter Universiade

Rank	Nation	Gold	Silver	Bronze	Total
1	Japan (JPN)	19	16	18	53
2	Austria (AUT)	11	8	9	28
3	Poland (POL)	7	10	9	26
4	Russia (RUS)	7	5	9	21
5	Slovenia (SLO)	6	5	6	17
6	South Korea (KOR)	4	5	1	10
7	Soviet Union (URS)	4	4	2	10
8	Czechoslovakia (TCH)	3	6	1	10
9	East Germany (GDR)	2	1	2	5
9	Italy (ITA)	2	1	2	5
11	Finland (FIN)	1	2	1	4
12	Kazakhstan (KAZ)	1	1	0	2
13	Belarus (BLR)	1	0	0	1
13	Bulgaria (BUL)	1	0	0	1
15	Czech Republic (CZE)	0	3	3	6
16	Yugoslavia (YUG)	0	1	3	4
17	United States (USA)	0	1	2	3
18	China (CHN)	0	0	1	1
18	Germany (GER)	0	0	1	1
Totals (19 entries)		69	69	70	208
