= 1991–92 FIS Ski Jumping Europa (Continental) Cup =

Ski jumping competition series

FIS Europa/Continental Cup 1991/92
Winners
- Overall: (Austria) Andreas Rauschmeier

Competitions
- Venues: 19
- Individual: 21

The 1991/92 FIS Ski Jumping Europa Cup was the 12th Europa Cup season in ski jumping for men and at the same counts as the 1st Continental Cup winter season in ski jumping. Europa Cup was a predecessor of Continental Cup with events held only in Europe.

21 individual men events were on calendar. But unclear if the competition held on 9 March 1992 in Reit im Winkl on Franz-Haslberger-Schanze K90 actually counted for Continental Cup or not where Franz Neuländtner won in front of Andreas Rauschmeier and Harald Rodlauer.

Other competitive circuits this season included the World Cup season.

== Men's Individual ==
Individual events in the CC history

| Total | L | N | Winners |
|---|---|---|---|
| 21 | 7 | 14 | 16 |

after normal hill event in Feldberg (5 April 1992)

=== Calendar ===
| EC | CC | No. | Date | Place (Hill) | Size | Winner | Second | Third |
|---|---|---|---|---|---|---|---|---|
| 230 | 1 | 1 | 14 December 1991 | (Germany) Oberwiesenthal (Fichtelbergschanzen K90) (Note: Not clear if Fichtelbergschanzen hill in Oberwiesenthal had K-point at K90 or K95 at that time.) | N _{001} | (Austria) Martin Höllwarth | (Austria) Andreas Goldberger | (Germany) Jürgen Winterhalder |
| 231 | 2 | 2 | 15 December 1991 | (Germany) Oberhof (Rennsteigschanze K90) | N _{002} | (Austria) Martin Höllwarth | (France) Nicolas Jean-Prost | (Czechoslovakia) Jiří Raška Jr. |
| 232 | 3 | 3 | 22 December 1991 | (France) Courchevel (Tremplin du Praz K120) | L _{001} | (Austria) Martin Höllwarth | (Finland) Raimo Ylipulli | (Finland) Vesa Hakala |
| 233 | 4 | 4 | 29 December 1991 | (Austria) St. Aegyd (Klaushoferschanze K73) | N _{003} | (Austria) Andreas Goldberger | (Austria) Klaus Huber | (Czechoslovakia) Marian Bielcik |
| 234 | 5 | 5 | 10 January 1992 | (Slovenia) Planica (Srednja Bloudkova K90) | N _{004} | (Austria) Andreas Rauschmeier | (Germany) Josef Heumann | (Germany) Andreas Bauer |
| 235 | 6 | 6 | 11 January 1992 | (Austria) Saalfelden (Bibergschanze K85) | N _{005} | (Austria) Heinz Kuttin | (Austria) Andreas Rauschmeier | (Czechoslovakia) Vladimír Podzimek |
| 236 | 7 | 7 | 12 January 1992 | (Germany) Ruhpolding (Große Zirmbergschanze K107) | L _{002} | (Austria) Heinz Kuttin | (Austria) Andreas Rauschmeier | (Austria) Alexander Pointner |
| 3rd Alps-Adria-Tournament Overall (10 – 12 January 1992) | | | | | | (Austria) Andreas Rauschmeier | (Germany) Josef Heumann | (Austria) Franz Neuländtner |
| 237 | 8 | 8 | 18 January 1992 | (Czechoslovakia) Liberec (Ještěd A K120) (Note: Not clear if they jumped in Liberec on normal (K90) or large hill (K120).) | N _{006} | (Czechoslovakia) Jiří Raška Jr. | (Czechoslovakia) Roman Lesota | (Czechoslovakia) Jaroslav Krejca |
| 238 | 9 | 9 | 19 January 1992 | (Czechoslovakia) Harrachov (Čerťák K90) | N _{007} | (Czechoslovakia) Peter Berger | (Czechoslovakia) Jiří Raška Jr. | (Czechoslovakia) Tomas Raszka |
| 29th Bohemia Tournament Overall (18 – 19 January 1992) | | | | | | (Czechoslovakia) Jiří Raška Jr. | (Czechoslovakia) Tomáš Raszka | (Czechoslovakia) Peter Berger |
| 239 | 10 | 10 | 25 January 1992 | (Germany) Willingen (Mühlenkopfschanze K120) (Note: Not clear if Mühlenkopfschanze hill in Willingen had K-point at K110 or K120 at that time.) | L _{003} | (Czechoslovakia) Roman Lesota | (Germany) Remo Lederer | (Austria) Christian Reinthaler |
| 240 | 11 | 11 | 26 January 1992 | (Germany) Willingen (Mühlenkopfschanze K120) | L _{004} | (Germany) Remo Lederer | (Germany) Ingo Lesser | (Czechoslovakia) Peter Berger |
| 241 | 12 | 12 | (Note: Another possible date of La Molina (2 February event) is actually 26 January (unclear).)2 February 1992 | (Spain) La Molina (Albert Bofill Mosella K75) | N _{008} | (France) Sebastian Frenot | (France) Jacky Arpin | (Slovenia) Janez Debelak |
1992 Winter Olympics (9 – 16 February • (France) Albertville)
| 242 | 13 | 13 | 23 February 1992 | (Poland) Szczyrk (Skalite K90) | N _{009} | (Poland) Wojciech Skupień | (Poland) Jan Kowal | (Poland) Andrzej Mlynarczyk |
| 243 | 14 | 14 | 29 February 1992 | (Germany) Schönwald (Adlerschanzen Schönwald K84) | N _{010} | (Austria) Stefan Horngacher | (France) Didier Mollard | (Austria) Andreas Rauschmeier |
| 244 | 15 | 15 | 1 March 1992 | (Germany) Titisee-Neustadt (Hochfirstschanze K112) (Note: Not clear if Hochfirstschanze hill in Titisee-Neustadt had K-point at K112 or K113 at that time.) | L _{005} | (Austria) Werner Haim | (Austria) Alexander Pointner | (Slovenia) Franci Rogelj |
| 21st Schwarzwald Tournament Overall (29 February – 1 March 1992) | | | | | | (Austria) Werner Haim | (Slovenia) Bine Rogelj | (Austria) Andreas Rauschmeier |
| 245 | 16 | 16 | 7 March 1992 | (France) Chamonix (Le Mont K95 | N _{011} | (Austria) Stefan Horngacher | (Germany) Ingo Lesser | (Austria) Werner Haim |
| 246 | 17 | 17 | 8 March 1992 | (Switzerland) Le Brassus (Tr. de la Chirurgienne K104) | L _{006} | (Austria) Werner Haim | (Austria) Franz Neuländtner | (Germany) Ingo Lesser |
| Grand Prix of Nations Overall (7 – 8 March 1992) | | | | | | (Austria) Werner Haim | (Germany) Ingo Lesser | (Austria) Franz Neuländtner |
| 247 | 18 | 18 | 20 March 1992 | (Norway) Sprova (Steinfjellbakken K90) (Note: Not clear if Steinfjellbakken hill in Skrova Had K-point at K85 or K90 at that time.) | N _{012} | (France) Yannick Revuz | (Sweden) Magnus Westman | (Norway) Bjørn Myrbakken |
| 248 | 19 | 19 | 21 March 1992 | (Norway) Meldal (Kløvsteinbakken K105) | L _{007} | (Norway) Bjørn Myrbakken | (Austria) Andreas Rauschmeier | (Austria) Franz Neuländtner |
FIS World Cup 1991/92 = FIS Ski Flying World Championships 1992 (21 March • (Czech Republic) Harrachov)
| 249 | 20 | 20 | 4 April 1992 | (Germany) Feldberg (Feldbergschanze K85) | N _{013} | (Czechoslovakia) Jiří Parma | (Austria) Alexander Pointner | (Austria) Alexander Pointner |
| 250 | 21 | 21 | 5 April 1992 | (Germany) Feldberg (Feldbergschanze K85) | N _{014} | (Germany) Rico Meinel | (Austria) Andreas Rauschmeier | (Austria) Alexander Pointner |
| 12th FIS Europa Cup Overall = 1st FIS Continental Cup Overall (14 December 1991 – 5 April 1993) | | | | | | (Austria) Andreas Rauschmeier | (Austria) Franz Neuländtner | (Germany) Remo Lederer |

== Standings ==
=== Overall ===
| Rank | after 21 events | Points |
|---|---|---|
| 1 | (Austria) Andreas Rauschmeier | 175 |
| 2 | (Austria) Franz Neuländtner | 152 |
| 3 | (Germany) Remo Lederer | 125 |
| 4 | (Austria) Alexander Pointner | 108 |
| 5 | (Austria) Werner Haim | 97 |
| 6 | (Germany) Ingo Lesser | 86 |
| 7 | (Austria) Martin Höllwarth | 75 |
| 8 | (Czechoslovakia) Jiří Raška Jr. | 72 |
| 9 | (Austria) Stefan Horngacher | 67 |
| | (Czechoslovakia) Roman Lesota | 67 |

== Europa Cup vs. Continental Cup ==
- This was originally penultimate Europa Cup season and is also recognized as the first Continental Cup season by International Ski Federation although under the "Continental Cup" name began its first official season in 1993/94.
- European Cup competitions included more than just competitors from the European continent. However, the standings at the end of each season included only European competitors. Competitors from Asia and North America were classified in the Pacific Rim Cup.

== See also ==
- 1991–92 FIS World Cup
