= Ski jumping at the 2015 Winter Universiade – Mixed team normal hill =

The mixed team normal hill competition of the 2015 Winter Universiade was held at the Sporting Centre FIS Štrbské Pleso on January 30.

The final round were cancelled due to bad weather condition and heavy snowfall

== Results ==
Rank	Bib	Country	Round 1 Distance (m)	Round 1 Points	Round 1 Rank	Total Points
1st place, gold medalist(s)	8	Japan I Yuka Kobayashi; Junshiro Kobayashi	85.5; 94	202.4; 91.8; 110.6	1	202.4
2nd place, silver medalist(s)	1	Russia II; Anastasiya Gladysheva; Mikhail Maksimochkin	79; 88	185; 79.9; 105.1	2	185
3rd place, bronze medalist(s)	4	Japan II; Aki Matsuhashi; Kanta Takanashi	83; 86	178.6; 85.9; 92.7	3	178.6
4	9	Russia I Irina Avvakumova; Ilmir Hazetdinov	77.5; 80	178; 77.5; 100.5	4	178
5	7	Czech Republic I Michaela Doleželová; Jan Souček	78; 69.5	129.5; 75.5; 54	5	129.5
6	5	Austria; Katharina Keil; Lukas Müller	60; 77.5	122.8; 39; 83.8	6	122.8
7	6	China I Li Xueyao; Li Chao	77; 60	102.6; 70.6; 32	7	102.6
8	2	China II; Ma Tong; Wang Bingrong	61; 54.5	62.9; 36.1; 26.8	8	62.9
9	3	Czech Republic II; Vladěna Pustková; Vít Háček	66.5; DSQ	48.6; 48.6; DSQ	9	48.6
