= Ski jumping at the 2015 Winter Universiade – Women's team normal hill =

The women's team normal hill competition of the 2015 Winter Universiade was held at the Sporting Centre FIS Štrbské Pleso on January 29.

== Results ==
Rank	Bib	Country	Round 1 Distance (m)	Round 1 Points	Round 1 Rank	Final Round Distance (m)	Final Round Points	Final Round Rank	Total Points
1st place, gold medalist(s)	5	Russia; Anastasiya Gladysheva; Irina Avvakumova	84.5; 88.5	201.7; 94.7; 107.0	1	75.0; 90.0	190.6; 80.1; 110.5	2	392.3
2nd place, silver medalist(s)	4	Japan; Aki Matsuhashi; Yuka Kobayashi	84.0; 79.5	188.0; 96.2; 91.8	2	81.5; 84.5	197.9; 97.5; 100.4	1	385.9
3rd place, bronze medalist(s)	3	Czech Republic; Vladěna Pustková; Michaela Doleželová	76.0; 75.5	157.6; 78.4; 79.2	3	74.0; 80.0	165.2; 76.1; 89.1	3	322.8
4	2	China; Ma Tong; Li Xueyao	69.0; 80.5	152.9; 64.5; 88.4	4	59.0; 80.0	130.5; 43.0; 87.5	4	283.4
5	1	Mixed Team; Svetlana Gladikova; Katharina Keil	63.5; 59.0	93.4; 51.7; 41.7	5	59.0; 59.0	90.4; 45.0; 45.4	5	183.8
