= Ski jumping at the 2015 Winter Universiade – Women's individual normal hill =

The women's individual normal hill competition of the 2015 Winter Universiade was held at the Sporting Centre FIS Štrbské Pleso on January 27.

== Results ==
| Rank | Bib | Name | Country | Round 1 Distance (m) | Round 1 Points | Round 1 Rank | Final Round Distance (m) | Final Round Points | Final Round Rank | Total Points |
|---|---|---|---|---|---|---|---|---|---|---|
| 1st place, gold medalist(s) | 11 | Irina Avvakumova | Russia | 88.5 | 108.3 | 1 | 95.5 | 114.9 | 1 | 223.2 |
| 2nd place, silver medalist(s) | 10 | Yuka Kobayashi | Japan | 83.5 | 99.7 | 2 | 84.0 | 98.5 | 2 | 198.2 |
| 3rd place, bronze medalist(s) | 9 | Anastasiya Gladysheva | Russia | 85.5 | 96.0 | 3 | 83.5 | 94.5 | 3 | 190.5 |
| 4 | 8 | Michaela Doleželová | Czech Republic | 82.5 | 93.6 | 4 | 82.0 | 92.7 | 4 | 186.3 |
| 5 | 3 | Li Xueyao | China | 81.5 | 85.2 | 5 | 78.5 | 88.3 | 6 | 173.5 |
| 6 | 5 | Aki Matsuhashi | Japan | 78.5 | 83.5 | 6 | 80.5 | 88.9 | 5 | 172.4 |
| 7 | 6 | Vladěna Pustková | Czech Republic | 70.5 | 67.9 | 7 | 69.5 | 65.8 | 7 | 133.7 |
| 8 | 4 | Ma Tong | China | 61.0 | 45.0 | 9 | 66.0 | 56.8 | 8 | 101.8 |
| 9 | 2 | Katharina Keil | Austria | 61.0 | 46.2 | 8 | 61.5 | 47.3 | 9 | 93.5 |
| 10 | 1 | Svetlana Gladikova | Russia | 57.0 | 32.4 | 10 | 57.5 | 41.3 | 10 | 73.7 |
| | 7 | Adelya Rashitova | Russia | | DSQ | | | | | DSQ |
