= Figure skating at the 2015 Winter Universiade – Men's singles =

The men's singles competition of the figure skating at the 2015 Winter Universiade was held at the Universiade Igloo in Granada. The short program was held on February 4 and the free skating was held on February 5.

== Results ==
=== Short program ===
Pl.	Name	Nation	TSS	TES	PCS	SS	TR	PE	CH	IN	Ded	StN
1	Takahiko Kozuka	Japan	77.15	41.35	37.80	7.90	7.45	7.20	7.70	7.55	-2.00	2
2	Artur Gachinski	Russia	73.78	37.13	36.65	7.55	7.00	7.50	7.25	7.35	0.00	22
3	Song Nan	China	73.48	40.38	33.10	6.70	6.40	6.75	6.60	6.65	0.00	11
4	Peter Liebers	Germany	73.23	36.78	36.45	7.35	7.00	7.35	7.30	7.45	0.00	9
5	Gordei Gorshkov	Russia	66.31	32.81	34.50	7.00	6.85	6.85	6.85	6.95	-1.00	10
6	Javier Raya	Spain	65.89	35.29	30.60	6.20	5.75	6.35	6.10	6.20	0.00	24
7	Ronald Lam	Hong Kong	65.20	35.20	31.00	6.40	5.75	6.20	6.35	6.30	-1.00	25
8	Liu Jiaxing	China	61.18	29.43	31.75	6.50	6.00	6.35	6.40	6.50	0.00	8
9	Romain Ponsart	France	59.15	30.50	29.65	6.15	5.50	5.85	6.05	6.10	-1.00	20
10	Stéphane Walker	Switzerland	59.00	32.20	27.80	5.60	5.25	5.85	5.50	5.60	-1.00	14
11	Ryuju Hino	Japan	58.92	30.87	29.05	6.05	5.70	5.85	5.80	5.65	-1.00	16
12	Pavel Kaška	Czech Republic	56.44	29.94	26.50	5.55	4.90	5.45	5.35	5.25	0.00	4
13	Valtter Virtanen	Finland	55.23	27.08	28.15	5.90	5.45	5.50	5.75	5.55	0.00	27
14	Moris Kvitelashvili	Russia	55.07	27.42	29.65	6.20	5.65	5.75	6.10	5.95	-2.00	23
15	Manuel Koll	Austria	54.74	27.09	27.65	5.35	5.25	5.65	5.60	5.80	0.00	7
16	Ondrej Spiegl	Sweden	54.22	26.87	28.35	5.45	5.30	5.75	5.85	6.00	-1.00	6
17	Maurizio Zandron	Italy	54.13	27.43	26.70	5.45	5.15	5.30	5.40	5.40	0.00	28
18	Marcus Björk	Sweden	53.10	29.10	24.00	5.05	4.50	4.75	4.95	4.75	0.00	1
19	Engin Ali Artan	Turkey	51.52	27.62	23.90	5.05	4.50	4.75	4.80	4.80	0.00	21
20	Abzal Rakimgaliev	Kazakhstan	50.91	25.26	26.65	5.40	4.95	5.40	5.35	5.55	-1.00	5
21	Felipe Montoya	Spain	49.32	23.12	26.20	5.40	4.95	5.25	5.25	5.35	0.00	18
22	Mario-Rafael Ionian	Austria	48.27	24.07	24.20	5.05	4.55	4.90	4.95	4.75	0.00	15
23	Leung Kwun Hung	Hong Kong	47.84	23.84	25.00	5.10	4.80	5.05	4.95	5.10	-1.00	19
24	Kristóf Forgó	Hungary	46.89	21.14	25.75	5.30	4.95	5.15	5.10	5.25	0.00	3
Did not advance to free skating
25	Kamil Dymowski	Poland	46.20	23.50	23.70	4.90	4.55	4.85	4.65	4.75	-1.00	13
26	Charles Parry-Evans	Great Britain	45.35	24.15	22.20	4.65	4.20	4.40	4.45	4.50	-1.00	26
27	Bela Papp	Finland	44.82	22.37	25.45	5.25	4.90	5.00	5.25	5.05	-3.00	29
28	Anton Karpuk	Belarus	43.61	19.96	23.65	4.80	4.50	4.75	4.85	4.75	0.00	17
29	Ali Demirboğa	Turkey	41.86	19.21	22.65	4.65	4.40	4.50	4.55	4.55	0.00	12

=== Free skating ===
Pl.	Name	Nation	TSS	TES	PCS	SS	TR	PE	CH	IN	Ded	StN
1	Peter Liebers	Germany	150.51	76.81	73.70	7.35	7.20	7.45	7.35	7.50	0.00	20
2	Artur Gachinski	Russia	142.81	66.81	77.00	7.80	7.40	7.75	7.75	7.80	-1.00	23
3	Takahiko Kozuka	Japan	140.55	62.05	80.50	8.35	7.85	7.80	8.15	8.10	-2.00	21
4	Moris Kvitelashvili	Russia	138.27	72.97	66.30	6.75	6.25	6.80	6.60	6.75	-1.00	10
5	Gordei Gorshkov	Russia	136.85	69.95	66.90	6.75	6.50	6.90	6.65	6.65	0.00	22
6	Song Nan	China	135.93	68.93	67.00	6.90	6.30	6.65	6.80	6.85	0.00	19
7	Ronald Lam	Hong Kong	131.37	69.97	64.40	6.65	6.30	6.40	6.40	6.45	-3.00	15
8	Ryuju Hino	Japan	127.38	66.68	61.70	6.45	5.90	6.20	6.20	6.10	-1.00	14
9	Romain Ponsart	France	123.58	59.48	65.10	6.60	6.10	6.55	6.55	6.75	-1.00	13
10	Liu Jiaxing	China	120.80	57.10	63.70	6.65	5.95	6.25	6.60	6.40	0.00	17
11	Pavel Kaška	Czech Republic	117.43	59.63	58.80	6.20	5.30	5.95	5.90	6.05	-1.00	18
12	Stéphane Walker	Switzerland	114.65	52.05	63.60	6.35	6.05	6.30	6.50	6.60	-1.00	16
13	Javier Raya	Spain	114.37	52.77	63.60	6.45	6.10	6.40	6.40	6.45	-2.00	24
14	Ondrej Spiegl	Sweden	112.56	55.06	58.50	6.05	5.55	5.90	5.85	5.90	-1.00	11
15	Abzal Rakimgaliev	Kazakhstan	110.61	56.31	56.30	5.85	5.25	5.60	5.65	5.80	-2.00	6
16	Valtter Virtanen	Finland	110.18	54.28	55.90	5.85	5.30	5.60	5.60	5.60	0.00	9
17	Marcus Björk	Sweden	105.33	52.83	54.50	5.65	5.20	5.45	5.45	5.50	-2.00	7
18	Mario-Rafael Ionian	Austria	103.06	51.96	51.10	5.20	4.75	5.35	5.10	5.15	0.00	5
19	Kristóf Forgó	Hungary	101.87	51.27	50.60	5.25	4.85	5.05	5.15	5.00	0.00	1
20	Maurizio Zandron	Italy	100.09	47.79	54.30	5.40	5.30	5.30	5.55	5.60	-2.00	12
21	Felipe Montoya	Spain	96.60	46.00	51.60	5.25	5.00	5.05	5.25	5.25	-1.00	4
22	Engin Ali Artan	Turkey	93.24	48.64	45.60	4.90	4.30	4.40	4.65	4.55	-1.00	3
23	Manuel Koll	Austria	82.28	34.28	49.00	5.10	4.65	4.80	5.00	4.95	-1.00	8
24	Leung Kwun Hung	Hong Kong	71.85	28.75	45.10	4.60	4.40	4.30	4.60	4.65	-2.00	2

=== Overall ===
Rank	Name	Nation	TP	SP		FS	
1st place, gold medalist(s)	Peter Liebers	Germany	223.74	4	73.23	1	150.51
2nd place, silver medalist(s)	Takahiko Kozuka	Japan	217.70	1	77.15	3	140.55
3rd place, bronze medalist(s)	Artur Gachinski	Russia	216.59	2	73.78	2	142.81
4	Song Nan	China	209.41	3	73.48	6	135.93
5	Gordei Gorshkov	Russia	203.16	5	66.31	5	136.85
6	Ronald Lam	Hong Kong	196.57	7	65.20	7	131.37
7	Moris Kvitelashvili	Russia	193.34	14	55.07	4	138.27
8	Ryuju Hino	Japan	186.30	11	58.92	8	127.38
9	Romain Ponsart	France	182.73	9	59.15	9	123.58
10	Liu Jiaxing	China	181.98	8	61.18	10	120.80
11	Javier Raya	Spain	180.26	6	65.89	13	114.37
12	Pavel Kaška	Czech Republic	173.87	12	56.44	11	117.43
13	Stéphane Walker	Switzerland	173.65	10	59.00	12	114.65
14	Ondrej Spiegl	Sweden	166.78	16	54.22	14	112.56
15	Valtter Virtanen	Finland	165.41	13	55.23	16	110.18
16	Abzal Rakimgaliev	Kazakhstan	161.52	20	50.91	15	110.61
17	Marcus Björk	Sweden	158.43	18	53.10	17	105.33
18	Maurizio Zandron	Italy	154.22	17	54.13	20	100.09
19	Mario-Rafael Ionian	Austria	151.33	22	48.27	18	103.06
20	Kristóf Forgó	Hungary	148.76	24	46.89	19	101.87
21	Felipe Montoya	Spain	145.92	21	49.32	21	96.60
22	Engin Ali Artan	Turkey	144.76	19	51.52	22	93.24
23	Manuel Koll	Austria	137.02	15	54.74	23	82.28
24	Leung Kwun Hung	Hong Kong	119.69	23	47.84	24	71.85
Did not advance to free skating
25	Kamil Dymowski	Poland		25	46.20	—	
26	Charles Parry-Evans	Great Britain		26	45.35	—	
27	Bela Papp	Finland		27	44.82	—	
28	Anton Karpuk	Belarus		28	43.61	—	
29	Ali Demirboğa	Turkey		29	41.86	—	
