= FIS Ski Jumping Europa Cup =

Ski Jumping Europa Cup
- Status: defunct
- Genre: ski jumping
- Location: Europe
- Inaugurated: 1980/81
- Most recent: 1992/93
- Organiser: International Ski Federation

The FIS Ski Jumping Europa Cup was a series of ski jumping competitions arranged yearly by the International Ski Federation. Prior to the formation of the Continental Cup in 1993, the Europa Cup served as the second level of international ski jumping, ranking below the World Cup. Athletes competing in the Europa Cup were usually juniors and jumpers fighting for a spot on their nation's World Cup team. Often some World Cup athletes would also compete in the Europa Cup in between World Cup events.

The International Ski Federation considers the last two Europa Cup seasons in 1991/92 and 1992/93 where they competed only in Europe and with only European ski jumpers, as first two Continental Cup seasons. Starting from the 1993/94 season the Continental Cup was officially started with events in North America and Asia and the Europa Cup was absorbed in the new Continental Cup as a result.

== Men's standings ==
last two season of Europa Cup also counted as Continental Cup seasons

Season	Winner	Second	Third
1980/81	(Austria) Alois Lipburger		
1981/82	(Austria) Hans Wallner	(Finland) Kari Ylianttila	(Germany) Peter Rohwein
1982/83	(Austria) Franz Wiegele	(Norway) Vegard Opaas	(Norway) Rolf Åge Berg
1983/84	(Bulgaria) Vladimir Breitchev	(Norway) Geir Johnson	(France) Gerrard Colin
1984/85	(Norway) Per Marten Olsrud	(Socialist Federal Republic of Yugoslavia) Vasja Bajc	(Socialist Federal Republic of Yugoslavia) Matjas Zagar
1985/86	(Bulgaria) Valentin Bozhkov	(Germany) Georg Waldvogel	(Czechoslovakia) Bohumil Vacek
1986/87	(Czechoslovakia) Jiří Malec	(Austria) Adolf Hirner	(Austria) Paul Erat
1987/88	(Austria) Werner Haim	(Socialist Federal Republic of Yugoslavia) Tomaž Dolar	(Austria) Oliver Strohmaier
1988/89	(Austria) Harald Rodlauer	(Austria) Stefan Horngacher	(Germany) Robert Leonhardt
1989/90	(Austria) Franz Wiegele	(Germany) Robert Leonhardt	(Switzerland) Stephan Zünd
1990/91	(Austria) Franz Neuländtner	(Austria) Werner Schuster	(Germany) Ingo Lesser
1991/92	(Austria) Andreas Rauschmeier	(Austria) Franz Neuländtner	(Germany) Remo Lederer
1992/93	(Austria) Franz Neuländtner	(Austria) Christian Moser	(Austria) Christoph Müller

== Double wins ==
No.	Season	Date	Place	Hill	Size	Winners	
1	1982/83		(Czechoslovakia) Štrbské Pleso	MS 1970 B K88	NH	(Czechoslovakia) Jan Jelenský	(Czechoslovakia) Peter Ciz
2	1984/85		(Austria) Wörgl	Latella-Schanze K83	NH	(Socialist Federal Republic of Yugoslavia) Matjaz Zagar	(Austria) Heinz Koch
