= Ski jumping at the 2015 Winter Universiade =

Ski jumping at the 2015 Winter Universiade was held in Štrbské Pleso from January 27 to February 1, 2015.

== Men's events ==
Event	Gold		Silver		Bronze	
Individual normal hill	(Bulgaria) Vladimir Zografski	248.8	(Russia) Ilmir Hazetdinov	244.2	(Russia) Evgeniy Klimov	241.7
Team normal hill	(Russia) Russia; Evgeniy Klimov; Mikhail Maksimochkin; Ilmir Hazetdinov	723.2	(Japan) Japan; Kanta Takanashi; Minato Mabuchi; Junshiro Kobayashi	702.3	(Poland) Poland; Andrzej Zapotoczny; Stanisław Biela; Jakub Kot	680.3

== Women's events ==
Event	Gold		Silver		Bronze	
Individual normal hill	(Russia) Irina Avvakumova	223.2	(Japan) Yuka Kobayashi	198.2	(Russia) Anastasiya Gladysheva	190.5
Team normal hill	(Russia) Russia; Anastasiya Gladysheva; Irina Avvakumova	392.3	(Japan) Japan; Aki Matsuhashi; Yuka Kobayashi	385.9	(Czech Republic) Czech Republic; Vladěna Pustková; Michaela Doleželová	322.8

== Mixed events ==
Event	Gold		Silver		Bronze	
Team normal hill	(Japan) Japan; Yuka Kobayashi; Junshiro Kobayashi	202.4	(Russia) Russia; Anastasiya Gladysheva; Mikhail Maksimochkin	185.0	(Japan) Japan; Aki Matsuhashi; Kanta Takanashi	178.6

== Medal table ==
Rank	Nation	Gold	Silver	Bronze	Total
1	Russia	3	2	2	7
2	Japan	1	3	1	5
3	Bulgaria	1	0	0	1
4	Czech Republic	0	0	1	1
4	Poland	0	0	1	1
Totals (5 entries)		5	5	5	15
