= Short-track speed skating at the 2015 Winter Universiade – Men's 5000 metres relay =

The men's 5000 metres relay competition of the Short track speed skating at the 2015 Winter Universiade was held at the Universiade Igloo, Granada the qualification was held on February 11, semifinal was held on February 12 and final was held on February 13.

== Results ==
=== Heats ===
Q — qualified for Semifinals
QT- qualified by time
ADV — advanced
PEN — penalty

Rank	Heat	Country	Bib	Name	Time	Notes
1	1	China	55; 56; 58; 59	Chen Guang; Ma Xinguang; Sui Xin; Xu Fu	7:08.372	Q
2	1	Russia	89; 90; 92; 93	Dmitrii Miasnikov; Kirill Shashin; Eduard Strelkov; Timur Zakharov	7:08.689	Q
3	1	Ukraine	95; 96; 97; 98	Mykyta Sokolov; Artem Khmelivskyi; Stanislav Omelchenko; Oleksandr Zheltonog	7:28.729	
1	2	United States	99; 100; 101; 104	Adam Callister; William Mullarkey; Benjamin Oh; Jae Jae Yoo	7:02.986	Q
2	2	Canada	50; 51; 53; 54	Samuel Belanger-Marceau; Cedrik Blais; Yoan Gauthier; William Louis Preudhomme	7:03.093	Q
3	2	Poland	83; 84; 86; 87	Adam Filipowicz; Rafał Grycner; Michał Kłosiński; Wojciech Kraśnicki	7:03.231	QT
1	3	South Korea	75; 76; 77; 78	Kim Joon-Chun; Lee Hyo-Been; Park Se-Young; Seo Yi-Ra	7:08.841	Q
2	3	Japan	70; 71; 72; 73	Iwashita Hijiri; Muratake Hironobu; Sekai Minto; Yokoyama Hiroki	7:08.992	Q
3	3	France	62; 64; 65; 66	Paul Beauchamp; Yoann Martinez; Jeremy Masson; Tristan Navarro	7:10.652	QT

=== Semifinals ===
QA — qualified for Final A
QB - qualified for Final B
ADV — advanced
PEN — penalty

Rank	Heat	Country	Bib	Name	Time	Notes
1	1	China	55; 56; 58; 59	Chen Guang; Ma Xingguang; Sui Xin; Xu Fu	6:57.359	QA
2	1	Japan	70; 71; 72; 73	Iwashita Hijiri; Muratake Hironobu; Sekai Minto; Yokoyama Hiroki	6:57.84	QA
3	1	South Korea	74; 75; 76; 78	Han Seung-soo; Kim Joon-chun; Lee Hyo-been; Seo Yi-ra	6:57.857	QB
4	1	Poland	83; 84; 85; 87	Adam Filipowicz; Rafał Grycner; Wojciech Kamienski; Wojciech Kraśnicki	7:03.991	QB
1	2	Russia	89; 90; 92; 93	Dmitrii Miasnikov; Kirill Shashin; Eduard Strelkov; Timur Zakharov	6:59.827	QA
2	2	France	63; 64; 65; 66	Thomas Meline; Yoann Martinez; Jeremy Masson; Tristan Navarro	6:59.969	QA
3	2	Canada	50; 52; 53; 54	Samuel Belanger-Marceau; Pascal Dion; Yoan Gauthier; William Louis Preudhomme	7:00.174	QB
4	2	United States	99; 101; 103; 104	Adam Callister; Benjamin Oh; Aaron Tran; Jae Jae Yoo	7:03.42	QB

=== Final B (classification round) ===
Rank	Country	Bib	Name	Time	Notes
5	South Korea	74; 76; 77; 78	Han Seung-soo; Lee Hyo-been; Park Se-young; Seo Yi-ra	6:39.442	UR
6	Canada	50; 51; 53; 54	Samuel Belanger-Marceau; Cedrik Blais; Yoan Gauthier; William Louis Preudhomme	6:50.31	
7	Poland	83; 85; 86; 87	Adam Filipowicz; Wojciech Kamienski; Michał Kłosiński; Wojciech Kraśnicki	No Time	
	United States	99; 100; 103; 104	Adam Callister; William Mullarkey; Aaron Tran; Jae Jae Yoo		PEN

=== Final A (medal round) ===
Rank	Country	Bib	Name	Time	Notes
1st place, gold medalist(s)	China	55; 56; 58; 59	Chen Guang; Ma Xingguang; Sui Xin; Xu Fu	7:11.252	
2nd place, silver medalist(s)	Russia	89; 90; 92; 93	Dmitriy Miasnikov; Kirill Shashin; Eduard Strelkov; Timur Zakharov	7:11.623	
3rd place, bronze medalist(s)	France	63; 64; 65; 66	Thomas Meline; Yoann Martinez; Jeremy Masson; Tristan Navarro	7:11.745	
4	Japan	69; 71; 72; 73	Iwasa Dan; Muratake Hironobu; Sekai Minto; Yokoyama Hiroki	7:17.456	
