= Ski jumping at the 1997 Winter Universiade =

Ski jumping at the 1997 Winter Universiade was held at the Jumping Park in Muju Resort in Muju, South Korea from January 26 to February 2, 1997.

== Men's events ==
Event	Gold	Silver	Bronze
Individual normal hill	(Poland) Łukasz Kruczek	(Japan) Yoshiharu Ikeda	(Austria) Gerhard Schallert
Individual large hill	(Japan) Yoshiharu Ikeda	(Austria) Alexander Pointner	(Japan) Yusuke Kaneko
Team normal hill	(Japan) Japan; Obora Takayuki; Kasama Noritaka; Yoshiharu Ikeda; Yusuke Kaneko	(Austria) Austria; Alexander Pointner; Gerhard Schallert; Christian Reinthaler; Werner Schuster	(Slovenia) Slovenia; Goran Janus; Matjaž Kladnik; Saso Komovec; Franci Petek

== Medal table ==
Rank	Nation	Gold	Silver	Bronze	Total
1	Japan	2	1	1	4
2	Poland	1	0	0	1
3	Austria	0	2	1	3
4	Slovenia	0	0	1	1
Totals (4 entries)		3	3	3	9
