= 2015 Universiade =

2015 Universiade may refer to:

- 2015 Summer Universiade, a summer sporting event held in Gwangju
- 2015 Winter Universiade, a winter sporting event
