= Snowboarding at the 2015 Winter Universiade – Men's halfpipe =

The men's halfpipe competition of the 2015 Winter Universiade was held at Sulayr Snowpark, Sierra Nevada, Spain at February 7, 2015.

== Results ==
=== Qualification ===
Rank	Bib	Name	Country	Run 1	Rank	Run 2	Rank	Best	Notes
1	31	Zhang Yiwei	China	84	2	94	1	94	Q
2	41	Nedefuji Ayumu	Japan	89.25	1	85.75	3	89.25	Q
3	50	Broc Waring	United States	82.75	3	86.25	2	86.25	Q
4	38	Nikita Avtaneev	Russia	77.5	5	84.5	4	84.5	Q
5	46	Zachary Black	United States	79	4	66.5	6	79	Q
6	47	Dylan Bidez	United States	67	6	73.75	5	73.75	Q
7	40	Woo Jae-Won	South Korea	27	14	63.75	7	63.75	Q
8	32	Yannis Tourki	France	51.75	9	63.5	8	63.5	Q
9	43	Hu Yi	China	62	7	34.25	14	62	Q
10	33	Huang Shiying	China	60.75	8	49	11	60.75	Q
11	36	Martin Mikyska	Czech Republic	49.75	10	54.5	9	54.5	Q
12	37	Alexandr Sladkov	Russia	49.25	11	51	10	51	Q
13	39	Pavel Smirnov	Russia	40.25	12	48.25	12	48.25	
14	45	Na Myung-Joo	South Korea	14	17	47.5	13	47.5	
15	44	Petr Horák	Czech Republic	29.25	13	22.75	15	29.25	
16	51	Fabrizio Arnaud	Italy	25.5	15	15.75	17	25.5	
17	34	Guo Yu	China	15	16	19.25	16	19.25	
	35	Piotr Gryzlo	Poland						DNS
	42	Mal Prior	United States						DNS
	48	Kaspar Grigorjev	Estonia						DNS
	49	Giacomo Picasso	Switzerland						DNS

=== Final ===
Rank	Bib	Name	Country	Run 1	Rank	Run 2	Rank	Best	Notes
1st place, gold medalist(s)	41	Nedefuji Ayumu	Japan	91.5	1	28	11	91.5	
2nd place, silver medalist(s)	46	Zachary Black	United States	85	3	90.5	1	90.5	
3rd place, bronze medalist(s)	50	Broc Waring	United States	85.5	2	85.25	2	85.5	
4	47	Dylan Bidez	United States	81.25	4	84	3	84	
5	38	Nikita Avtaneev	Russia	80.25	5	79.25	4	80.25	
6	37	Alexandr Sladkov	Russia	72.5	6	51	8	72.5	
7	40	Woo Jae-Won	South Korea	64.25	7	59.75	5	64.25	
8	36	Martin Mikyska	Czech Republic	60	8	34	10	60	
9	43	Hu Yi	China	52.25	9	55.5	6	55.5	
10	33	Huang Shiying	China	10	12	55.25	7	55.25	
11	32	Yannis Tourki	France	17.75	11	46.5	9	46.5	
12	31	Zhang Yiwei	China	43.5	10	21.25	12	43.5	
