= Wojciech Gąsienica-Kotelnicki =

Polish ski jumper

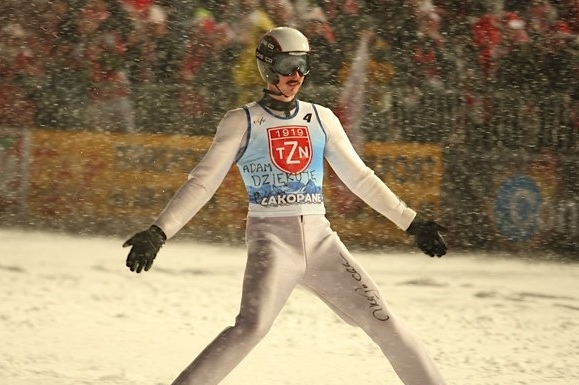

Personal information
- Nationality: Poland
- Born: 14 November 1989 (age 36) Zakopane

Sport
- Sport: Skiing
- Club: Start Krokiew Zakopane (2004–2009); Wisła Zakopane (2009–2012); KS Chochołów (2012–2014); AZS Zakopane (since 2014)

Achievements and titles
- Personal bests: 143 m (469 ft); Wielka Krokiew, Zakopane (2011)
Medal record
Bronze medal – third place	2011 Winter Universiade	K-95 hill Team event

Wojciech Gąsienica-Kotelnicki (born 14 November 1989 in Zakopane) is a Polish ski jumper and Nordic combined athlete, representing the AZS Zakopane club. He won a bronze medal in the team event at the 2011 Winter Universiade.

He made his national team debut on 21 January 2006 during a FIS Cup competition in Ljubno. His best result in this series is a victory in Szczyrk in July 2013. His highest ranking in the FIS Cup overall standings came in the 2006/2007 season, when he finished in 28th place. On 2 February 2008, he competed in a Continental Cup event for the first time, finishing 80th in Zakopane. On 3 February 2011, he took 3rd place in the team competition at the Winter World University Games. Individually, he placed 17th and 19th.

He won a bronze medal at the Polish Summer Ski Jumping Championships in the team competition with the Start Krokiew Zakopane team. He was selected for the Polish junior national team for three seasons.

His personal best is 143 m during training at Wielka Krokiew in Zakopane.

== Ski jumping career ==
Wojciech Gąsienica-Kotelnicki began ski jumping in the 6th grade of elementary school. Prior to that, he had trained in slalom skiing. In February 2004, during the TZN Championships in Zakopane, he placed 33rd in the junior competition.

=== 2004/2005 season ===
On 28 May 2004, he took part in a school league competition at Mała Krokiew and finished in 13th place. On 8 June, he placed 16th. During the Crunchips Grand Cup competition in July 2004, he finished in 37th place. In August, he placed 38th in the McDonald's Cup. On 8 October, he competed in the Euroleague in Zakopane, where he placed 17th in the 1989–1990 age group. On 23 December, he placed 10th in the 28th School Winter Sports League competition at Mała Krokiew, in the 1989–90 age group. On 2 January 2005, he placed 11th in the next school league competition on the K-65 hill.

On 11 February, he made his debut in the national Lotos Cup series, competing in the junior category. In the competition held at Mała Krokiew, he finished in 29th place. The following day, he was 27th on the normal hill. On 22 February, the National Youth Olympics took place on the K-65 hill, where Kotelnicki finished in 26th place. He placed 17th on the K-85 hill, and in the team competition on the same hill, he placed 7th. On 4 March, he was 24th in the Lotos Cup on the K-50 hill in Szczyrk. He then competed in the Silesian-Beskid Ski Association Championships at the same venue. On 5 March, the open category competition took place, where he finished 48th, achieving a jump of 53 m. On the second day, age-group competitions were held, and Kotelnicki placed 18th in the junior series, jumping 65.5 m twice.

On 11 March, he finished in the top 20 of the Lotos Cup for the first time. He placed 16th at Łabajów after jumps of 55 m and 50.5 m. The junior competition was held on the same hill during the National Meeting of Student Sports Clubs. He finished in 13th place after jumps of 52 m and 52.5 m. On 19 March, the Lotos Cup ended, and Gąsienica-Kotelnicki placed 29th in the standings for his age group.

=== 2005/2006 season ===
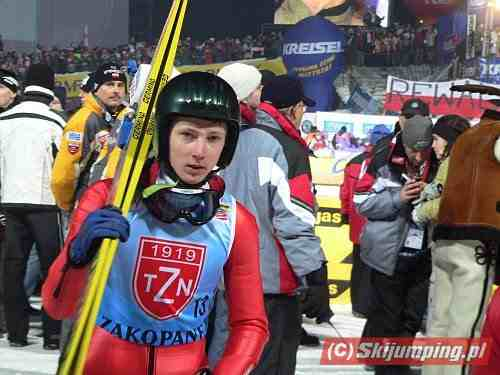
Gąsienica-Kotelnicki as the opening jumper at the World Cup competition in Zakopane

In the Christmas competition on 26 December 2005 in Zakopane, he finished 53rd. He placed 23rd at the January TZN Championships in Zakopane, after jumping 108 m and 115.5 m, which earned him sixth place in the junior standings.

On 21 January, he made his debut in an official FIS competition, taking part in a FIS Cup event in Ljubno. After a jump of 75 meters, he finished in 42nd place. The next day, he placed 32nd, landing 1.5 meters further. On 8 February, he won the 1988–1989 age group category at the school league competition in Zakopane, jumping 81 m and 87 m On 15 February, he took fourth place after jumps of 82.5 m and 78 m in the OOM competition at Orlinek, now competing among juniors. He placed 3rd at Lubawka, achieving 88.5 m and 82 m. On 25 February, he competed in the Polish Championships for the first time. On the large hill in Zakopane, he placed 30th after jumps of 98.5 m and 93 m. On the medium hill, he tied for 23rd place with Krzysztof Stryczula – in the first round he jumped 76.5 m, and in the second, five meters shorter. On 5 March, he earned his first points in the FIS Cup at Średnia Krokiew. Among 30 competitors, he placed 23rd, achieving 78.5 m in the first round and 75.5 m in the final round. The eight points he earned placed him 226th in the overall standings at the end of the season. On 11 March, he placed 8th in the junior classification at the Silesian-Beskid Ski Association Championships, with jumps of 73 m and 75 m. During the TZN Championships in Zakopane, which concluded the national competition for the season, he placed 4th among juniors, achieving distances of 81.5 m and 82.5 m.

=== 2006/2007 season ===
Gąsienica-Kotelnicki was selected for the Polish national team's B squad, led by Adam Celej, for the 2006/2007 season.

During the Perfect Milk Cup competition, held on 17 June 2007 at Wielka Krokiew, he finished 50th in the senior event. In the junior competition, he placed 17th.

On 1 July, he placed 27th in a FIS Cup competition at the HS-78 hill in Bischofshofen, jumping 61.5 m and 55 m.

On 23 July 2006, he was 5th in the 1988–1989 age group at the Crunchips Cup competition at Średnia Krokiew, with jumps of 83.5 m and 79.5 m.

On 7 October, he placed 10th in a FIS Cup competition on the medium hill in Einsiedeln, achieving jumps of 69 m and 67 m. A day later, he placed 28th on the large hill. After these competitions, he held 48th place in the overall standings.

On 17 September, he took 3rd place in the Summer League competition at Średnia Krokiew, in the 1988–1990 age group. On 14 October, he finished 48th on the large hill at the Polish Summer Championships in Zakopane and 44th on the normal hill. In February, he competed in Zakopane. On 10 February, he placed 13th at the TZN Championships on the large hill, winning the junior classification after jumps of 114.5 m and 115.5 m.

A week later, the FIS Cup took place. After jumps of 81.5 m and 83.5 m, he placed 8th in the first competition. The next day, he was ranked one spot lower – he achieved jumps of 86 m and 86.5 m. Ultimately, he finished 28th in the overall series standings, earning 94 points.

On 22 February, he finished 8th in the OOM individual competition on a normal hill, landing at 78.5 m and 70 m. He took 4th place at Wielka Krokiew, jumping 117.5 m and 122 m.

=== 2007/2008 season ===
Gąsienica-Kotelnicki was selected for the Polish national team for the 2007/2008 season as part of the junior squad coached by Adam Celej.

On 23 June 2007, he placed 23rd in the open category in the Perfect Milk Cup competition in Zakopane after a jump of 91.5 m. He was 2nd in the Junior A classification. On 22 July, he placed 15th in the Junior A category in the Crunchips Grand Cup competition at Średnia Krokiew, achieving a jump of 67 m in his only round.

On 2 September, he competed in the FIS Cup at the HS 106 hill in Oberwiesenthal, where he placed 8th with jumps of 96 m and 94 m.

On 21 September, the Solidarity Cup took place at Wielka Krokiew, where he finished 23rd. He placed 8th among the juniors there.

On 6 and 7 October, the FIS Cup competition took place in Einsiedeln. Gąsienica-Kotelnicki finished 14th on the medium hill and 12th on the large hill. After completing the summer portion of the series, he was ranked 27th in the overall standings.

At the 2007 Polish Summer Championships in Zakopane in October, he finished 24th on the large hill (after jumps of 112 m and 108 m) and 13th on the normal hill (achieving 82.5 m and 76 m). On 26 December 2007, he placed 22nd at the Polish Championships at Wielka Krokiew, jumping 110.5 m and 113 m.

On 2 February, he made his debut in the Continental Cup. He finished 70th in the competition at Wielka Krokiew, landing a jump of 105.5 m. The next day, he jumped 6.5 meters farther and tied for 69th place with Roman Trofimov. On 17 February, two FIS Cup competitions were held in Szczyrk. In the first one, Gąsienica-Kotelnicki finished 8th, landing a jump of 93.5 m in the only round. In the second, he placed 14th, achieving distances of 97 m and 90.5 m. Ultimately, he finished 40th in the overall standings of the series with 122 points.

Three days later, the OOM competitions were held at the same venue. He finished 8th on the normal hill, jumping 92.5 m and 88.5 m. In the second competition, he placed 9th. On 15 March, he placed 8th in the Junior A category at the TZN Championships at Średnia Krokiew, achieving jumps of 76 m and 75.5 m. On the large hill, with jumps of 103 m and 107 m, he placed 19th in the open category and 9th among Junior A competitors. The Polish Championships were also held in Zakopane in March. On the large hill, he placed 39th after a jump of 85.5 m, and on the normal hill, he placed 23rd after jumps of 79.5 m and 76 m.

=== 2008/2009 season ===
Wojciech Gąsienica-Kotelnicki was selected for the Polish junior national ski jumping team for the 2008/2009 season.

On 19 June, he placed 9th in the Summer League competition at Mała Krokiew. On 20 July 2008, he won the Crunchips Grand Cup competition in the Junior A category at Średnia Krokiew, after landing a jump of 91 m.

On 10 September, he took 2nd place in the Summer League competition at Średnia Krokiew. He repeated this result nine days later at the same venue. The Polish Summer Championships were held in Wisła at the end of September. In the individual competition, Gąsienica-Kotelnicki finished 11th, jumping 115.5 m and 116.5 m, while in the team event, his team Start Krokiew Zakopane won the bronze medal, and he himself jumped 111 m and 118.5 m.

On 11 October, he made his debut in the Summer Continental Cup in Falun. He jumped 83.5 m and was ranked 32nd.

On 20 December, another FIS Cup competition was held in Štrbské Pleso. This time, the Polish athlete finished in 13th place after jumping 89 m and 91 m. In January, he finished 25th and 22nd in Harrachov, and 19th in Lauscha. These were his final competitions of that series for the season. In the overall standings of the 2008/2009 FIS Cup, he finished 63rd with 81 points.

On 14 February 2009, he finished 56th at the Polish Championships in Wisła. The team competition took place a month later in Szczyrk; this time, Gąsienica-Kotelnicki competed as part of his club's second team. He landed jumps of 94.5 m and 92.5 m, and his team finished in 5th place. On 14 March, he placed 20th at the TZN Championships on the normal hill, which earned him 4th place in the Junior A category. On the large hill, he was 22nd in the open classification and again 4th among juniors.

=== 2009/2010 season ===
On 2 August 2009, he finished in 17th place at the International Olympians Memorial in Szczyrk. Six days later, he took the lowest spot on the podium in the competition for the Cup of the President of the Silesian-Beskid Ski Association, held as part of Beskid Culture Week. Jumps of 121 m and 118 m secured him this position during the competition at Malinka. On 26 September, he placed 21st in the Solidarity Cup competition.

In October 2009, he placed 34th on the normal hill and 15th on the large hill during the Summer Polish Championships in Zakopane. In December, the Polish Championships were held at Skalite, where he placed 31st.

=== 2010/2011 season ===
In July 2010, the Summer Polish Championships were held in Szczyrk. Gąsienica-Kotelnicki finished 14th on the normal hill, with jumps of 86 m and 84 m. In the team competition, he competed for the second team of Wisła Zakopane. The team finished in 5th place, and Kotelnicki achieved jumps of 84.5 m and 87.5 m. On 1 August, he placed 7th after jumps of 99 m and 96 m at the 2nd International Olympians Memorial in Szczyrk. On 28 August, he won the bronze medal in the Zakopane Mayor's Cup competition, achieving jumps of 124.5 m and 118.5 m.

He competed in the Autumn Cup, a series of national competitions held in Zakopane. He took part in all eight events and finished 3rd in the overall standings with 456 points. In the September competitions for the Solidarity Cup, he placed 5th and 6th. In December, he was 20th and 18th in the Winter Cup competitions.

In December 2010, he placed 18th at the Polish Championships in Zakopane, jumping 110.5 m and 98.5 m. He placed 13th at the TZN Championships.

At the January FIS Cup competitions in Štrbské Pleso, he finished 15th and 14th. In Szczyrk, he was 15th and 13th. He also competed in the Continental Cup events in Titisee-Neustadt, where he finished 61st and 43rd. The 2011 Winter Universiade took place in Erzurum at the end of January and beginning of February. In the competition on the HS 140 hill, he finished 19th after jumps of 120 m and 121.5 m. On the HS 109 hill, he finished 17th after jumps of 90 m and 95.5 m. In the team competition held on the normal hill, he won a bronze medal alongside the brothers Jakub and Maciej Kot. He jumped 94 m and 102 m.

On 19 February, the Polish Championships were held on the normal hill in Szczyrk. He finished in 15th place, jumping 92.5 m and 91 m. In the team competition, he placed 4th. He finished 54th and 60th in the Continental Cup competitions on the large hill in Zakopane on 26–27 February. He participated in the TZN Championships in March, where he placed 13th on the normal hill, and 2nd on the large hill after a jump of 131 m.

=== 2011/2012 season ===
In the 2011/2012 season, he once again competed in the Autumn Cup. After two events, he was in 4th place in the overall standings, but the remaining events were canceled. On 17 September 2011, he finished 25th at the Summer Polish Championships in Zakopane, with jumps of 104 m and 95 m. Six days later, Polish ski jumpers competed for the Solidarity Cup. Gąsienica-Kotelnicki finished 5th, jumping 119.5 m and 122.5 m.

The Polish Championships were held at Malinka on 26 December 2011 – he finished 14th, landing twice at 98.5 m. On 10 February, he returned to competition in the Lotos Cup following the introduction of a senior classification. He finished 4th twice at Średnia Krokiew. On 22 February, he was 7th in Szczyrk.

On 8 March, he finished 4th again at the Lotos Cup competition in Zakopane. The points he earned allowed him to finish 4th in the overall standings of the series. In March 2012, the Polish Championships were held in Zakopane. He finished 36th in the individual competition and 8th in the team event. In the TZN Championships, he placed 7th and 11th.

=== 2012/2013 season ===
On 2 September 2012, he finished 24th at the Summer Polish Championships in Wisła, jumping 111.5 m and 110 m. A week later, he competed in the FIS Cup in Wisła. In the first competition, he landed twice at the 117-meter mark and finished in 11th place. In the second event, he reached 120 m twice, which earned him 6th place. On 6 October, he took 5th place in the Solidarity Cup competition at Wielka Krokiew, jumping 124.5 m in the first round and half a meter less in the second. A day later, he finished 10th in a competition as part of the TZN President's Cup series.

On 26 December, he finished 27th in the Christmas competition in Wisła. On 28 December, he stood on the podium for the first time at the Lotos Cup – after jumps of 92 m and 91 m, he placed 2nd in Szczyrk. On 9 February, he finished 33rd in the FIS Cup competition in Zakopane. He ended the season in 85th place in the overall standings with 64 points earned during the summer. On 13 February, he finished 6th in the Lotos Cup competition at Wielka Krokiew. In the senior overall standings, he finished 10th, earning 120 points and competing in two of the six events.

=== 2013/2014 season ===
On 20 July 2013, he finished 15th in the PZN President's Cup competition in Wisła. A week later, he competed in the FIS Cup events at Skalite. In the first event, he finished 4th after two jumps of 98 meters. He trailed 3rd-place finisher Przemysław Kantyka by half a point. A day later, he won, being the only one to reach the 100-meter mark twice – in the first round he jumped 102.5 m, and in the second 100 m. His lead over 2nd-place Wangler was one and a half points. After these competitions, he was in 4th place in the overall standings.

On 17 August in Zakopane, he finished in 6th place in the FIS Cup competition after a jump of 123 m. On 24 August, he won the PZN President's Cup competition in Wisła. He jumped 125.5 m and 127 m. On 1 September, he placed 14th at the Polish Championships in Szczyrk. Six days later, he placed 16th in the Solidarity Cup in Zakopane. The next day, he placed 21st in the Polish Summer Championships at the same venue.

On 14 September in Lillehammer, he competed in the Summer Continental Cup for the first time this season. He finished 49th after a 105-meter jump.

On 7 February 2014, he competed in the Lotos Cup in Szczyrk. He finished 4th out of 11 competitors in the Senior category. The next day, he placed 5th.

On 26 February, he won the Lotos Cup competition at Wielka Krokiew. He landed jumps of 126 m and 125 m. Over the next two days, he competed at this venue in FIS Cup events, finishing 52nd and 31st. On 8 March, he took part in a Continental Cup competition, also at this hill, jumping as part of the national team. He placed 39th after a jump of 118 m. In the second competition, he landed at 103 meters and finished in 62nd place.

=== 2014/2015 season ===
On 19 July 2014, he competed in the individual event at the Summer National Championships in Wisła. He finished in 16th place, after jumps of 115.5 m and 117.5 m. A day later, in the team competition, he competed for his club's second team and, with jumps of 92 m and 113 m, received the lowest score among his teammates. The team finished in 6th place. On 27 July at the VI Olympians' Memorial in Szczyrk, he placed 22nd.

On 29 August, he placed 8th in the competition held in Wisła that opened the 2014 PZN President's Cup series. On 13 September in the Zakopane Solidarity Cup, he placed 12th.

In the competition for the national summer championship on the normal hill in Szczyrk, held in October, he finished 22nd.

At the end of March 2016, he announced that he had ended his athletic career a few months earlier.

== Nordic combined career ==
At the 2009 Polish Summer Championships in Zakopane held on 10 October, Gąsienica-Kotelnicki finished in 20th place, having been in 4th place after the ski jumping round. In the September 2010 Autumn Cup competition in Zakopane, he took 2nd place, having been in 1st place after the ski jumping. In the second competition of this series, he finished in 6th place. On 9 October, the third Autumn Cup competition took place. After the jumping round, Gąsienica-Kotelnicki was in the lead with a jump of 85 m. On the first lap of the cross-country race, Mateusz Wantulok overtook Kotelnicki, who ultimately finished 7th. In the final competition of this series, he achieved his best result in the jumps. After the first lap of the cross-country race, he was caught by Wantulok, and later also by Wojciech Marusarz and Konrad Turczak. He ultimately finished 4th and took 3rd place in the overall standings. In the Winter Cup competition held on 18 December, he finished in 14th place, though he was the second-ranked Pole in the standings.

On 7 October 2011, he finished 6th at the Autumn Cup competition in Zakopane, having led after the ski jumping round.

In 2011, he decided to stop competing in the Nordic combined due to his poor performance in cross-country skiing.

== Results ==
=== Overall FIS Cup standings ===
Season	Place
2005/2006	226.
2006/2007	28.
2007/2008	40.
2008/2009	63.
2010/2011	90.
2012/2013	85.
2013/2014	19.
2014/2015	169.

=== Other achievements ===
- TZN Championships
  - 2005 – 6th place among juniors
  - 2006 – 4th place among juniors
  - 2007 – victory in the juniors standings
  - 2008 – 8th place on the normal hill in the Junior A standings and 9th in the Junior A standings
  - 2009 – 4th place in the Junior A standings on the normal hill and on the large hill
  - 2011 – 2nd place on the large hill
  - 2012 – 7th
- National Youth Olympics
  - 2006 – 4th and 3rd place among juniors
  - 2007 – 8th place on the normal hill, 4th place on the large hill
  - 2008 – 9th and 8th place
- Crunchips Grand Cup
  - 2006 – 6th place in the 1988–1989 standings
  - 2008 – victory in the Junior A category
- Silesian-Beskid Ski Association Championships 2006 – 8th place in the juniors competition
- Perfect Milk Cup
  - 2007 – 2nd place in the Junior A standings
- Solidarity Cup
  - 2007 – 8th place among juniors
  - 2010 – 5th and 6th place
  - 2011 – 5th place
  - 2012 – 5th place
- International Olympians' Memorial in Szczyrk 2010 – 7th place
- Silesian-Beskid Ski Association President's Cup 2009 – 3rd place
- Zakopane Mayor's Cup "for the Highland Hat" 2010 – 3rd place
- Autumn Cup 2010 – 3rd place in the overall standings
- Autumn Cup 2011 – 4th place in the overall standings
