= Ski jumping at the 2015 Winter Universiade – Men's team normal hill =

The men's team normal hill competition of the 2015 Winter Universiade was held at the Sporting Centre FIS Štrbské Pleso on February 1.

== Results ==
Rank	Bib	Country	Round 1 Distance (m)	Round 1 Points	Round 1 Rank	Final Round Distance (m)	Final Round Points	Final Round Rank	Total Points
1st place, gold medalist(s)	9	Russia; Evgeni Klimov; Mikhail Maksimochkin; Ilmir Hazetdinov	96.5; 90.5; 90	356.2; 123.7; 116.1; 116.4	1	98; 92; 95	367; 125.8; 116.2; 125	1	723.2
2nd place, silver medalist(s)	7	Japan; Kanta Takanashi; Minato Mabuchi; Junshiro Kobayashi	94; 88.5; 95	351.1; 118; 108.6; 124.5	2	92; 90.5; 95	351.2; 114.2; 113; 124	2	702.3
3rd place, bronze medalist(s)	10	Poland; Andrzej Zapotoczny; Stanisław Biela; Jakub Kot	94.5; 87.5; 85	331.8; 118.2; 108.5; 105.1	3	95; 93.5; 89.5	348.5; 122.5; 114.4; 111.6	3	680.3
4	4	Germany; Florian Menz; Jan Mayländer; Tobias Simon	89; 88.5; 86	308.2; 102.1; 102.5; 103.6	4	88; 87; 87.5	316.8; 105.5; 104.2; 107.1	5	625
5	5	Finland; Frans Tähkävuori; Riku Tähkävuori; Ossi-Pekka Valta	87; 90; 85	305.9; 101.1; 106.2; 98.6	6	88.5; 87.5; 87	312.1; 105.3; 101.1; 105.7	6	618
6	6	Slovenia; Matej Likar; Žiga Mandl; Ernest Prišlič	80.5; 90.5; 89	306.7; 86.4; 110.5; 109.8	5	83; 93; 87	311; 89.6; 116.9; 104.5	7	617.7
7	8	Austria; Thomas Ortner; Björn Koch; Thomas Lackner	83.5; 82; 84.5	292.2; 97.6; 107.7; 112.6	7	85.5; 88.5; 90.5	317.9; 97.6; 107.7; 112.6	4	610.1
8	1	Norway; Joakim Larsen Aune; Alexander Henningsen; Stian Andre Skinnes	84.5; 82; 85.5	288.3; 99.9; 87.6; 100.8	8	90.5; 81.5; 86.5	302.2; 112.5; 88.4; 101.3	8	590.5
9	2	Czech Republic; Jan Souček; Vít Háček; Petr Kutal	78; 76.5; 74	235.4; 82.2; 75.8; 77.4	9				235.4
10	3	Ukraine; Vatalii Dodyuk; Igor Yakibyuk; Ruslan Balanda	65; 70.5; 68.5	174.2; 51.4; 58.3; 64.5	10				174.2
