= Peter Liebers =

German figure skater

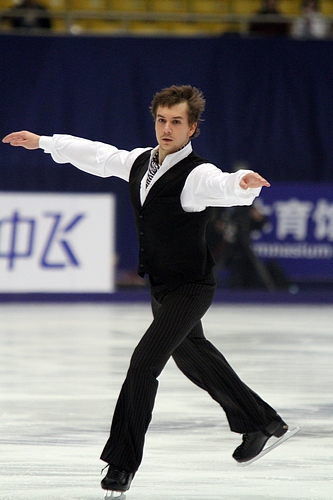
- Liebers in 2010.

Personal information
- Born: 16 April 1988 (age 38) East Berlin, East Germany
- Height: 1.70 m (5 ft 7 in)

Figure skating career
- Country: Germany
- Coach: Viola Striegler
- Skating club: SC Berlin
- Began skating: 1994
- Retired: January 19, 2018

Peter Liebers (born 16 April 1988) is a German former competitive figure skater. He is the 2015 Winter Universiade champion, the 2010 Nebelhorn Trophy bronze medalist, the 2012 Ice Challenge champion, and a six-time German national champion. He placed eighth at the 2014 Winter Olympics in Sochi and as high as sixth at the European Championships (2014 and 2015).

== Personal life ==
Peter Liebers was born on 16 April 1988 in Berlin. He is the son of Mario Liebers and the younger brother of Martin Liebers, both of whom competed internationally in figure skating. He speaks German and English.

In the summer of 2014, he married German former competitive figure skater Denise Zimmermann. On May 1, 2015, Zimmermann gave birth to the couple's first child, a son named Emil.

== Career ==
=== Early years ===
Liebers began skating in 1994. He won the 2002 German junior national title and competed in four seasons of the ISU Junior Grand Prix series. He finished 13th at the 2006 World Junior Championships but, while practicing following the event, he broke his left leg when he hit a rut in the ice. As a result, he missed the 2006–07 season and had a metal insert in his leg until March 2007, returning to the ice in May.

=== 2007–08 to 2012–13 ===
In 2008, Liebers finished 13th in his debut at the European Championships and 32nd at the World Championships. The next season, he competed at two senior Grand Prix events and won his first German senior national title.

In the 2010–11 season, Liebers won bronze at the 2010 Nebelhorn Trophy and competed at two Grand Prix events. He finished 11th at the 2011 Europeans and 15th at the 2011 Worlds.

In June 2011, Liebers broke his sacrum while working on a new program in Toronto, Canada. He won the silver medal at the 2011 NRW Trophy and bronze at the 2012 Coupe Internationale de Nice. Liebers finished tenth at the 2013 European Championships and eleventh at the 2013 World Championships. It was the best World result of his career and qualified a spot for Germany in men's singles at the 2014 Winter Olympics.

=== 2013–14 season ===
Liebers placed a career-best sixth at the 2014 European Championships in Budapest. In February 2014, he was training six to seven hours a day. At the Olympics in Sochi, he represented Germany in the team event short program and then finished eighth in the separate men's event. In March, he competed in Saitama, Japan at the 2014 World Championships, where he placed 14th.

=== 2014–15 season ===
Having fallen and broken his left shoulder while working on a modified spin, Liebers underwent an operation in the second half of August 2014. Estimated to lose up to eight weeks following the operation, he withdrew from the 2014 Cup of China. He later withdrew from his second Grand Prix assignment, the 2014 NHK Trophy, and the German Championships. In January 2015, he took bronze at the Toruń Cup and finished sixth at the European Championships in Stockholm, Sweden. The following month, he won gold at the Winter Universiade in Granada, having climbed from fourth in the short program to finish ahead of Takahiko Kozuka and Artur Gachinski.

=== 2015–16 season ===
Liebers began his season on the ISU Challenger Series (CS), placing 5th at the 2015 Nebelhorn Trophy. He dropped out of his next CS event, the 2015 Finlandia Trophy, due to an adductor strain and later withdrew from his GP assignments, the 2015 Skate Canada International and the 2015 Rostelecom Cup, and the German Championships for the same reason. On 20 December 2015, the Deutsche Presse-Agentur reported that Liebers had ended his season, the injury being more serious than initially thought. As a result of a gap in the acetabulum, caused by a fall, he underwent an arthroscopic operation on 23 February 2016 and was expected to rest for six weeks.

== Programs ==
Season	Short program	Free skating	Exhibition
2016–2017 2015–2016	Jubel by Klingande	Theme from Schindler's List by John Williams; Prelude in C-sharp minor by Sergei Rachmaninoff; Hatikvah (The Hope)	
2014–2015 2013–2014	Clocks by 2Cellos feat. Lang Lang choreo. by Lori Nichol	Who Wants to Live Forever; Smells Like Teen Spirit both performed by David Garrett choreo. by Shin Amano	
2012–2013	Alexander by Vangelis	Resistance; Hurt by Muse both performed by 2Cellos	
2011–2012	Blues Deluxe by Joe Bonamassa choreo. by Lori Nichol	Resistance; Hurt by Muse both performed by 2Cellos	
2010–2011	Blues Deluxe by Joe Bonamassa choreo. by Lori Nichol	Sherlock Holmes by Hans Zimmer choreo. by Shin Amano	
2009–2010	Les Lacs du Connemara by Michel Sardou	Habanera (from Carmen); Symphony No. 9; For Elise; Piano Concerto by Ludwig van Beethoven (all modern arrangements)	
2008–2009	Les Lacs du Connemara by Michel Sardou	Ying and Yang (selection of Asian music)	
2007–2008	National Treasure by Trevor Rabin	Ying and Yang (selection of Asian music)	Dirty Boogie by Brian Setzer
2005–2006	Ying and Yang (selection of Asian music)	Cool Runnings by Hans Zimmer, Ernie Freeman	
2004–2005	La Primavera by Sasha	Cool Runnings by Hans Zimmer, Ernie Freeman	

== Competitive highlights ==
=== Seasons: 2007–2008 to present ===
International
Event	07–08	08–09	09–10	10–11	11–12	12–13	13–14	14–15	15–16	16–17	17–18
Olympics							8th				
Worlds	32nd	25th	25th	15th	20th	11th	14th	29th			
Europeans	13th	15th		11th	15th	10th	6th	6th			WD
GP Bompard		6th	10th	7th							
GP Cup of China				9th			7th	WD			
GP NHK Trophy		10th						WD			
GP Rostelecom Cup							7th		WD		
CS Autumn Classic											7th
CS Ice Star											10th
CS Nebelhorn									5th		
CS Tallinn Trophy											4th
Universiade								1st			
Challenge Cup		5th			5th						
Cup of Nice	6th	5th		4th		3rd	4th				3rd
Finlandia Trophy		5th	8th								
Golden Spin	7th	5th									
Ice Challenge						1st					
Nebelhorn Trophy	15th	9th		3rd		10th					
Nepela Trophy			5th				3rd				
NRW Trophy					2nd	3rd				4th	
Seibt Memorial						1st					
Toruń Cup								3rd		2nd	
National
German Champ.	2nd	1st	2nd	1st	1st	1st	1st	WD	WD	1st	2nd
Team events
Olympics							8th T				

=== Seasons: 1999–2000 to 2005–2006 ===
International: Junior
Event	01–02	02–03	03–04	04–05	05–06
Junior Worlds					13th
JGP Germany				4th	
JGP Hungary				10th	
JGP Italy		14th			
JGP Japan					4th
JGP Mexico			8th		
JGP Poland					11th
JGP Slovakia		12th			
JGP Slovenia			10th		
Dragon Trophy					3rd J
National
German Champ.	1st J		5th	5th	6th
