= Ski jumping at the 2017 Winter Universiade =

Ski jumping at the XXVIII Winter Universiade
- Venue: Sunkar International Ski Jumping Complex
- Dates: 1–5 February 2017

Ski jumping at the 2017 Winter Universiade was held in Sunkar International Ski Jumping Complex from 1 to 5 February 2017.

== Men's events ==
Event	Gold		Silver		Bronze	
Individual normal hill	(Japan) Naoki Nakamura	265.8	(Russia) Mikhail Maksimochkin	263.4	(Austria) Thomas Lackner	261.2
Team normal hill	(Russia) Russia; Aleksandr Bazhenov; Roman Trofimov; Mikhail Maksimochkin	789.9	(Slovenia) Slovenia; Anže Lavtižar; Andraž Modic; Aljaž Vodan	783.8	(Poland) Poland; Krzysztof Miętus; Stanisław Biela; Przemysław Kantyka	761.8

== Women's events ==
Event	Gold		Silver		Bronze	
Individual normal hill	(Japan) Haruka Iwasa	212.6	(Japan) Yuka Kobayashi	200.2	(Czech Republic) Marta Křepelková	198.8
Team normal hill	(Japan) Japan; Yuka Kobayashi; Haruka Iwasa	432.8	(Czech Republic) Czech Republic; Karolína Indráčková; Marta Křepelková	344.4	(Russia) Russia; Stefaniya Nadymova; Alena Sutiagina	307.8

== Mixed events ==
Event	Gold		Silver		Bronze	
Team normal hill	(Japan) Japan; Haruka Iwasa; Naoki Nakamura	445.1	(Czech Republic) Czech Republic; Marta Křepelková; Čestmír Kožíšek	434.9	(Japan) Japan; Yuka Kobayashi; Max Koga	430.6

== Medal table ==
Rank	Nation	Gold	Silver	Bronze	Total
1	Japan	4	1	1	6
2	Russia	1	1	1	3
3	Czech Republic	0	2	1	3
4	Slovenia	0	1	0	1
5	Austria	0	0	1	1
5	Poland	0	0	1	1
Totals (6 entries)		5	5	5	15
