= 2017 Universiade =

2017 Universiade may refer to:

- 2017 Summer Universiade, a summer sporting event held in Taipei
- 2017 Winter Universiade, a winter sporting event held in Almaty
