= List of World University Games records in short-track speed skating =

This is the list of Winter World University Games records in short-track speed skating maintained by FISU, current after the 2023 Winter World University Games.

== Men ==
Event	Record	Athlete	Nationality	Date	Edition	Place	Ref
500 metres	40.589	Kim Do-kyoum	South Korea	6 February 2017	2017 Universiade	Almaty, Kazakhstan	
1000 metres	1:25.079	Um Cheon-ho	South Korea	20 December 2013	2013 Universiade	Trentino, Italy	
1500 metres	2:13.058	Park Ji-won	South Korea	4 March 2019	2019 Universiade	Krasnoyarsk, Russia	
5000 metres relay	6:39.442	Han Seung-soo; Lee Hyo-been; Park Se-yeong; Seo Yi-ra	South Korea	13 February 2015	2015 Universiade	Granada, Spain	

== Women ==
Event	Record	Athlete	Nationality	Date	Edition	Place	Ref
500 metres	43.215	Ekaterina Efremenkova	Russia	5 March 2019	2019 Universiade	Krasnoyarsk, Russia	
1000 metres	1:29.505	Ekaterina Efremenkova	Russia	6 March 2019	2019 Universiade	Krasnoyarsk, Russia	
1500 metres	2:22.249	Choi Eun-kyung	South Korea	19 January 2005	2005 Universiade	Innsbruck, Austria	
3000 metres relay	4:12.322	Noh Do-hee; Kim A-lang; Park Ji-won; Son Ha-kyung	South Korea	5 March 2019	2019 Universiade	Krasnoyarsk, Russia	

== Mixed ==
Event	Record	Athlete	Nationality	Date	Edition	Place	Ref
2000 metres relay	2:42.988	Choi Min-jeong; Kim Geon-hee; Kim Tae-sung; Lee Jeong-min	South Korea	19 January 2023	2023 World University Games	Lake Placid, United States	
