= Ski jumping at the 2011 Winter Universiade =

Ski jumping at the 2011 Winter Universiade was held at the Kiremitliktepe Ski Jump in Erzurum, Turkey. The four events were scheduled between January 28 - February 3, 2011.

== Men ==
Event	Gold		Silver		Bronze	
Normal hill individual	Matej Dobovšek; Slovenia	269.0	Maciej Kot; Poland	254.9	Žiga Mandl; Slovenia	254.5
Large hill individual	Matej Dobovšek; Slovenia	285.7	Maciej Kot; Poland	281.9	Žiga Mandl; Slovenia	271.6
Normal hill team	Japan (JPN); Shotaro Hosoda; Yumu Harada; Sho Suzuki	743.0	Slovenia (SLO); Rok Mandl; Matej Dobovšek; Žiga Mandl	742.4	Poland (POL); Jakub Kot; Wojciech Gąsienica-Kotelnicki; Maciej Kot	735.8

== Women ==
Event	Gold		Silver		Bronze	
Normal hill individual	Elena Runggaldier; Italy	240.8	Yurika Hirayama; Japan	221.4	Lisa Demetz; Italy	218.6

== Medals table ==
Rank	Nation	Gold	Silver	Bronze	Total
1	Slovenia	2	1	2	5
2	Japan	1	1	0	2
3	Italy	1	0	1	2
4	Poland	0	2	1	3
Totals (4 entries)		4	4	4	12
