= Liu Jiaxing =

Chinese figure skater

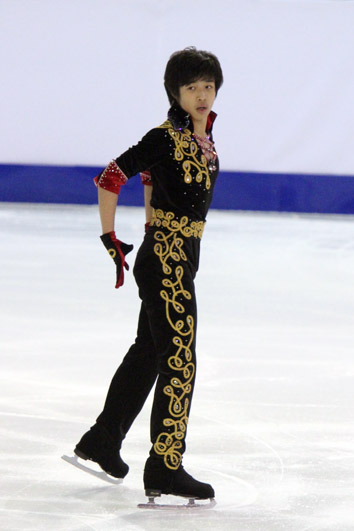

Personal information
- Born: May 13, 1993 (age 33) Harbin, China
- Height: 1.75 m (5 ft 9 in)

Figure skating career
- Country: China
- Coach: Cong Wenyi
- Skating club: Harbin Winter Sports Training Center
- Began skating: 1998

Liu Jiaxing (simplified Chinese: 刘佳星; traditional Chinese: 劉佳星; pinyin: Liú Jiāxīng; May 13, 1993) is a Chinese former figure skater. He competed at two World Junior Championships, reaching the free skate both times.

== Programs ==
Season	Short program	Free skating	Exhibition
2012–2013	Moulin Rouge!	Terracotta Warrior by Shigeru Umebayashi	
2010–2011	The Matrix	The Legend of Zorro by James Horner; Lady Caliph by Ennio Morricone; Pasodoble	Por una cabeza by Carlos Gardel; Xinwen Lianbo; We Are the Heirs of Communism; Super Mario Bros. by Koji Kondo; Journey to the West
2009–2010	Ice Passion by Edvin Marton	The Legend of Zorro by James Horner	

== Competitive highlights ==
JGP: Junior Grand Prix

International
Event	09–10	10–11	11–12	12–13	13–14	14–15
Universiade						10th
International: Junior
Junior Worlds	14th	16th				
JGP Belarus	4th					
JGP Czech Rep.		5th				
JGP Germany		10th				
JGP Hungary	7th					
JGP Latvia			5th			
National
Chinese NG			7th			
Chinese Champ.	6th	WD	5th	8th	16th	5th
WD: Withdrew

== Detailed results ==
2011–12 season
Date	Event	Level	QR	SP	FS	Total
January 4–6, 2012	12th Chinese National Winter Games	Senior	–	11; 54.63	7; 122.40	7; 177.03
September 20–23, 2011	2012 Chinese Championships	Senior	5; 92.29	3; 63.67	7; 123.59	5; 279.55
Aug. 31 – Sept. 3, 2011	2011 Junior Grand Prix, Latvia	Junior	–	5; 55.20	4; 115.52	5; 170.72
2010–11 season
Date	Event	Level	QR	SP	FS	Total
Feb. 27 – March 6, 2011	2011 World Junior Championships	Junior	–	16; 54.88	16; 98.68	16; 153.56
December 23–24, 2010	2011 Chinese Championships	Senior	–	5; 55.62	–	WD
October 13–16, 2010	2010 Junior Grand Prix, Czech	Junior	–	3; 62.59	5; 106.06	5; 168.65
October 6–9, 2010	2010 Junior Grand Prix, Germany	Junior	–	13; 49.98	7; 108.52	10; 158.50
2009–10 season
Date	Event	Level	QR	SP	FS	Total
March 8–14, 2010	2010 World Junior Championships	Junior	–	17; 50.95	9; 110.55	14; 161.50
September 23–26, 2009	2009 Junior Grand Prix, Belarus	Junior	–	5; 52.10	5; 105.65	4; 157.75
September 3–5, 2009	2010 Chinese Championships	Senior	–	7 ?	6 ?	6; 166.56
August 26–29, 2009	2009 Junior Grand Prix, Hungary	Junior	–	6; 51.31	8; 94.41	7; 145.72
