= Japan at the 2015 Winter Universiade =

- IOC code: JPN
- NOC: Japanese Olympic Committee
- Website: www.joc.or.jp/english/ (in English)

in Granada, Spain and Štrbské Pleso-Osrblie, Slovakia 24 January – 14 February 2015
- Competitors: 97 in 11 sports
- Medals Ranked 10th: Gold 2 Silver 5 Bronze 2 Total 9

Winter Universiade appearances (overview)
- 1960; 1962; 1964; 1966; 1968; 1972; 1978; 1981; 1983; 1985; 1987; 1989; 1991; 1993; 1995; 1997; 1999; 2001; 2003; 2005; 2007; 2009; 2011; 2013; 2015; 2017; 2019; 2023; 2025

Japan competed at the 2015 Winter Universiade in Granada, Spain, and Štrbské Pleso-Osrblie, Slovakia. The country finished tenth in the medal table with two gold, five silver, and two bronze medals.

== Medal summary ==
=== Medalists ===
Medal	Name	Sport	Event	Date
Gold	Yuka Kobayashi; Junshiro Kobayashi	Ski jumping	Mixed team normal hill	January 30
Gold	Ayumu Nedefuji	Snowboarding	Men's halfpipe	February 7
Silver	Yuka Kobayashi	Ski jumping	Women's individual normal hill	January 27
Silver	Aki Matsuhashi; Yuka Kobayashi	Ski jumping	Women's team normal hill	January 29
Silver	Go Yamamoto; Aguri Shimizu; Takehiro Watanabe	Nordic combined	Team normal hill	January 31
Silver	Junshiro Kobayashi; Kanta Takanashi; Minato Mabuchi	Ski jumping	Men's team normal hill	February 1
Silver	Takahiko Kozuka	Figure skating	Men's singles	February 5
Bronze	Aki Matsuhashi; Kanta Takanashi	Ski jumping	Mixed team normal hill	January 30
Bronze	Nana Fujimoto; Shiori Koike; Nachi Fujimoto; Ayaka Toko; Miyuka Yoshida; Sena Suzuki; Mika Hori; Haruna Yoneyama; Mai Morii; Chiho Osawa; Moeko Fujimoto; Seika Yuyama; Miyou Touma; Yui Notoya; Yukina Ota; Runa Moritake; Asami Ohashi; Yuuri Komura; Mayu Iwasaki; Nene Sugisawa; Rio Sakamoto; Amika Yoshida	Ice hockey	Women's tournaments	February 12

=== Medals by sport ===
Medals by sport
Sport	1st place, gold medalist(s)	2nd place, silver medalist(s)	3rd place, bronze medalist(s)	Total
Ski jumping	1	3	1	5
Snowboarding	1	0	0	1
Figure skating	0	1	0	1
Nordic combined	0	1	0	1
Ice hockey	0	0	1	1
Total	2	5	2	9
