= Figure skating at the 2015 Winter Universiade =

- Type: Senior international
- Date: February 4 – 8
- Season: 2014–15
- Location: Granada, Spain
- Venue: Universiade Igloo

Champions
- Men's singles: (Germany) Peter Liebers
- Ladies' singles: (Russia) Alena Leonova
- Pairs: (China) Yu Xiaoyu / Jin Yang
- Ice dance: (Italy) Charlène Guignard / Marco Fabbri
- Previous: 2013 Winter Universiade
- Next: 2017 Winter Universiade

Figure skating at the 2015 Winter Universiade was held at the Universiade Igloo in Granada from February 4 to 8, 2015.

== Medalists ==
Event	Gold	Silver	Bronze
Men's singles	(Germany) Peter Liebers	(Japan) Takahiko Kozuka	(Russia) Artur Gachinski
Ladies' singles	(Russia) Alena Leonova	(France) Maé-Bérénice Méité	(Russia) Maria Artemieva
Pairs	(China) Yu Xiaoyu / Jin Yang	(Russia) Kristina Astakhova / Alexei Rogonov	(France) Vanessa James / Morgan Ciprès
Ice dancing	(Italy) Charlène Guignard / Marco Fabbri	(Spain) Sara Hurtado / Adriàn Díaz	(Slovakia) Federica Testa / Lukáš Csölley

== Medal table ==
* Host nation (Spain)

Rank	Nation	Gold	Silver	Bronze	Total
1	Russia	1	1	2	4
2	China	1	0	0	1
2	Germany	1	0	0	1
2	Italy	1	0	0	1
5	France	0	1	1	2
6	Japan	0	1	0	1
6	Spain*	0	1	0	1
8	Slovakia	0	0	1	1
Totals (8 entries)		4	4	4	12
