= Fichtelbergschanzen =

Ski jumping hills in Oberwiesenthal, Germany

Coordinates: 50.4236°N 12.9615°E

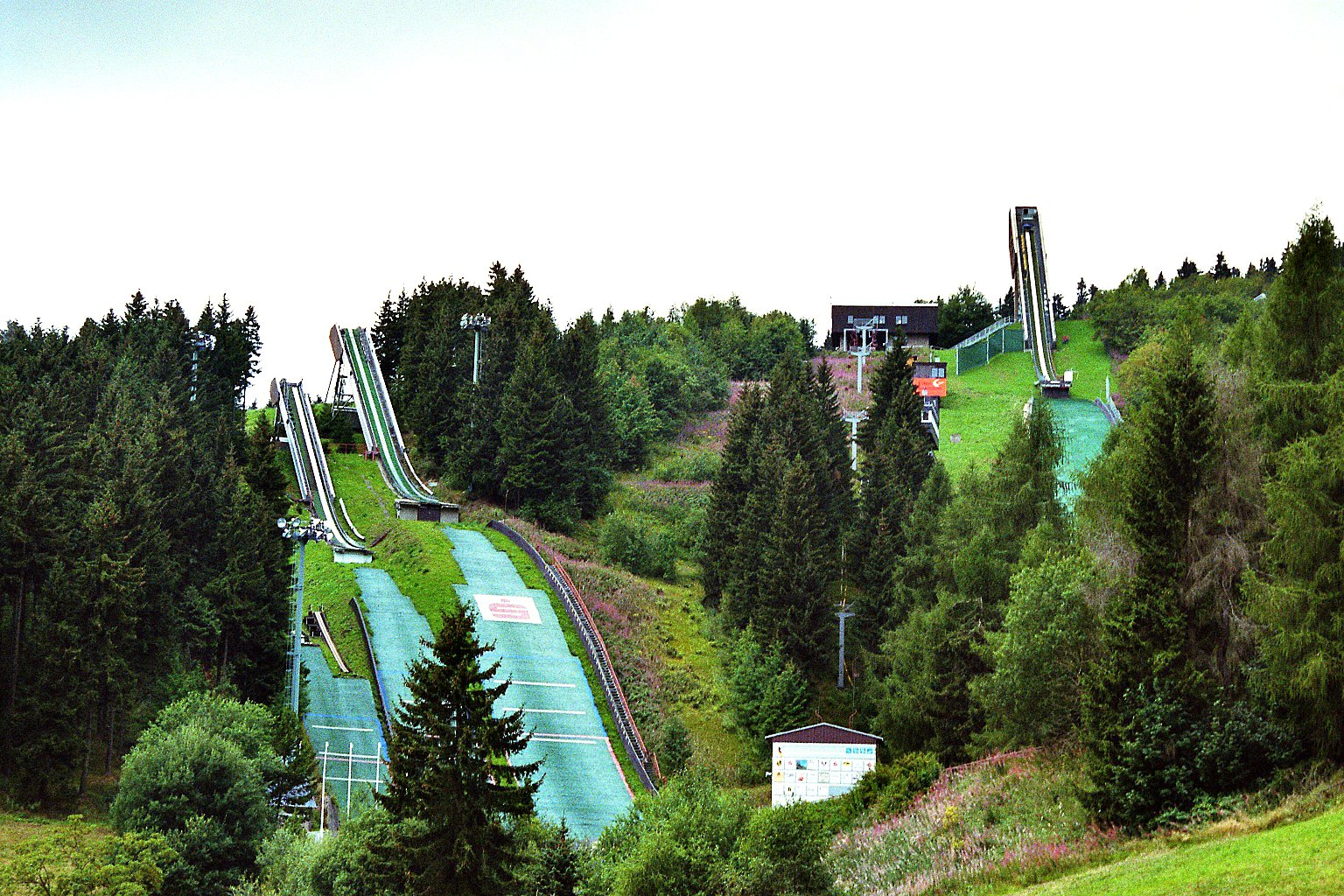
- Location: Oberwiesenthal; Germany
- Opened: 1938; 87 years ago
- Renovated: 1974; 51 years ago, 1991; 34 years ago

Size
- K–point: K-95
- Hill size: HS 100
- Hill record: 106 m (353 ft) (Germany) Tobias Bogner (4 September 2004)

Fichtelbergschanzen are ski jumping hills in Oberwiesenthal, Germany.

== History ==
Original hill was opened in 1938 and demolished in 1972. They built a totally new steel inrun in 1974 and again totally reconstructed in 1991. It hosted FIS Ski jumping World Cup events in 1980s and more world cup events in Nordic combined. Tobias Bogner holds the hill record.

Oberwiesenthal hosted the 2020 Nordic Junior World Ski Championships.

== World Cup ==
=== Men ===
Date	Size	Winner	Second	Third
19 Jan 1986	K-90	(East Germany) Ulf Findeisen (Austria) Ernst Vettori		(East Germany) Ingo Lesser
14 Jan 1987	K-90	(Austria) Ernst Vettori	(Norway) Hroar Stjernen	(Czechoslovakia) Jiří Parma
