= Ski jumping at the 2007 Winter Universiade =

Ski jumping at the 2007 Winter Universiade includes four ski jumping events.

== Medal table ==
| Rank | Nation | Gold | Silver | Bronze | Total |
|---|---|---|---|---|---|
| 1 | Austria (AUT) | 1 | 0 | 0 | 1 |
| 2 | Japan (JPN) | 0 | 1 | 1 | 2 |
| Totals (2 entries) | | 1 | 1 | 1 | 3 |

== Women's events ==
=== Individual K95 ===
| Pos. | Athlete | Dist. | Points | Jury | Total |
|---|---|---|---|---|---|
| 1st place, gold medalist(s) | (Austria) Daniela Iraschko | 92.0 | 54.0 | 51.5 | 105.5 |
| 2nd place, silver medalist(s) | (Japan) Misaki Shigeno | 71.0 | 12.0 | 47.0 | 59.0 |
| 3rd place, bronze medalist(s) | (Japan) Erina Kabe | 68.5 | 7.0 | 46.5 | 53.5 |
| 4. | (Slovenia) Maja Vtic | 67.0 | 4.0 | 43.5 | 47.5 |
| 5. | (Slovenia) Monika Pogladic | 65.5 | 1.0 | 43.5 | 44.5 |
