= Mikhail Maksimochkin =

Russian ski jumper (born 1993)

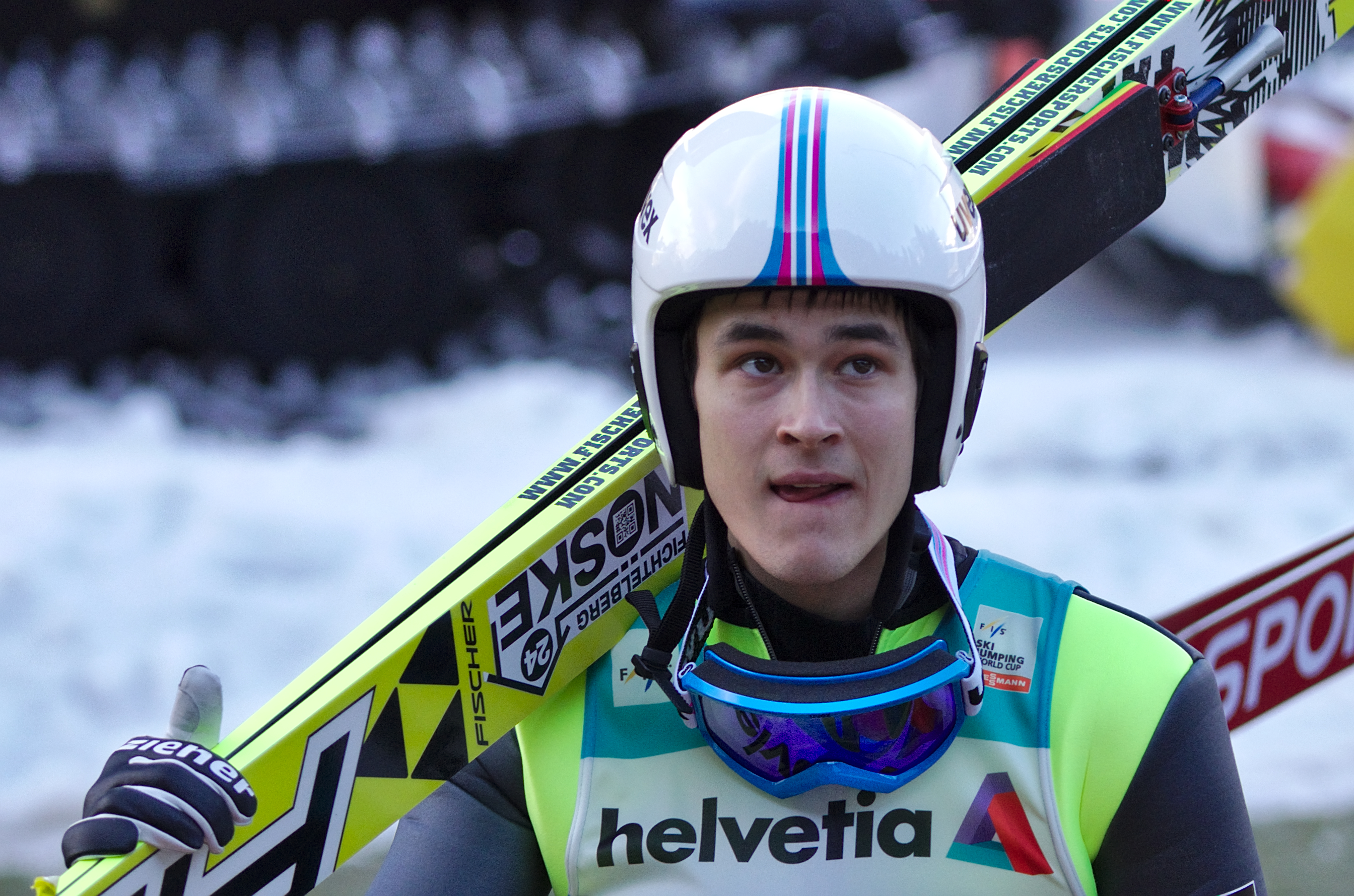

Personal information
- Born: 29 August 1993 (age 32) Nizhny Novgorod, Russia

Sport
- Sport: Skiing
Medal record
Men's ski jumping
Representing Russia
Winter Universiade
Gold medal – first place	2013 Trentino	Mixed team
Gold medal – first place	2013 Osrblie	Team NH
Silver medal – second place	2013 Trentino	Team LH
Silver medal – second place	2015 Osrblie	Mixed team
Bronze medal – third place	2013 Trentino	Individual NH

Mikhail Maksimochkin (born 29 August 1993, in Nizhny Novgorod) is a Russian ski jumper.

Maksimochkin competed at the 2014 Winter Olympics for Russia. He placed 29th in the normal hill qualifying round, and 30th in the final.

Maksimochkin made his World Cup debut in November 2013. As of September 2014, his best finish is 5th, in a large hill event at Zakopane in 2013–14. His best World Cup overall finish is 54th, in 2013–14.
