= Andreas Rauschmeier =

Austrian ski jumper (born 1970)

Personal information
- Full name: Andreas Rauschmeier
- Born: 9 September 1970 (age 55) Salzburg, Austria

Sport
- Sport: Skiing

World Cup career
- Seasons: 1988–1992
- Indiv. podiums: 1
- Updated on 30 Mar 2015

Andreas Rauschmeier (born 9 September 1970) is an Austrian former ski jumper.
