= Yusuke Kaneko =

Japanese ski jumper

Personal information
- Born: 18 April 1976 (age 50) Sapporo, Japan

Sport
- Sport: Skiing
- Club: Tokyo Biso

World Cup career
- Seasons: 1997, 2003-2005
- Indiv. wins: 0

Yusuke Kaneko (金子 祐介, Kaneko Yūsuke; born 18 April 1976) is a Japanese ski jumper.

In the World Cup his highest place was number 17 from February 2005 in Sapporo.
