= Remo Lederer =

German ski jumper

Personal information
- Born: 19 December 1968 (age 57) Rodewisch, East Germany
- Height: 174 cm (5 ft 9 in)
- Weight: 63

Sport
- Sport: Skiing
- Club: SC Dynamo Klingenthal

World Cup career
- Seasons: 1985-1992
- Indiv. podiums: 1
- Indiv. wins: 0
- Updated on 14 September 2008

Remo Lederer (born 19 December 1968, in Rodewisch) is a retired German ski jumper.

In the World Cup he finished three times among the top 10, his best result being a third place from St. Moritz in January 1988. He also competed at the 1988 Winter Olympics.
