= Alexander Pointner =

Austrian ski jumping coach

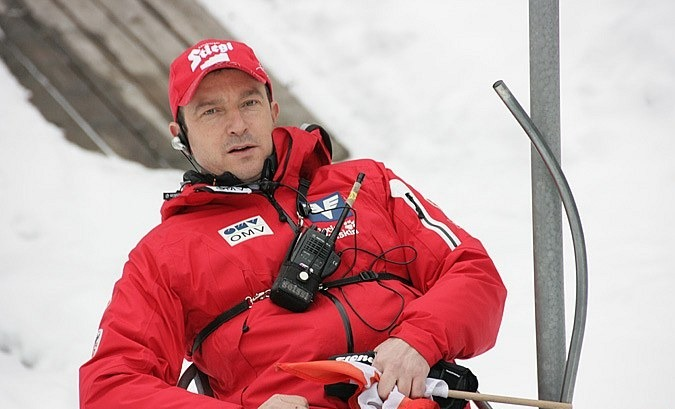
Alexander Pointner

Alexander Pointner (born January 1, 1971, in Grieskirchen) is the former head coach of Austria ski jumping team.

Since 2014 he has been superseded by Heinz Kuttin as head coach of the Austrian National Skijumping Team.
