= Li Xueyao =

Chinese ski jumper (born 1995)

Li Xueyao 李雪尧
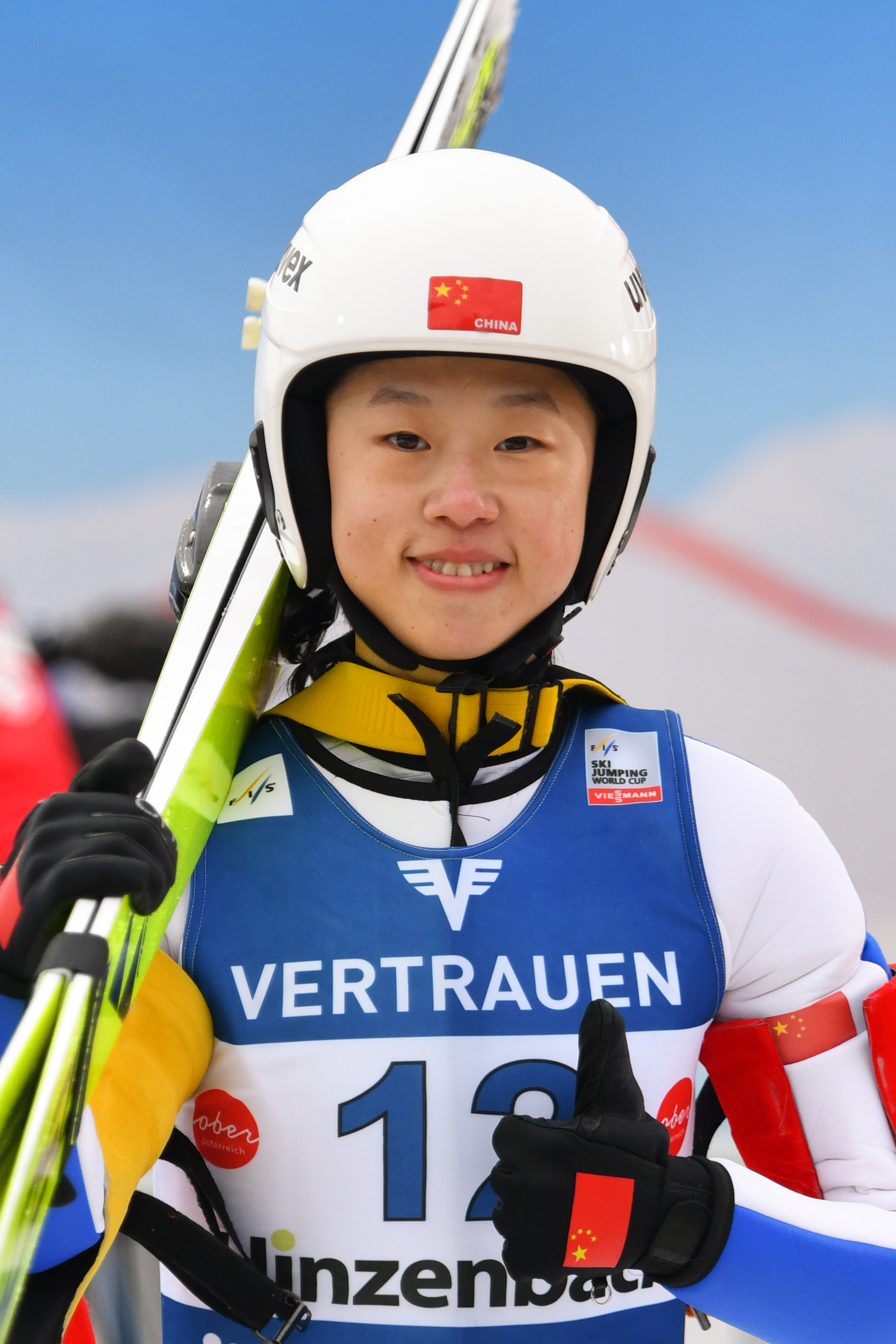

Personal information
- Nationality: China
- Born: 11 April 1995 (age 31) Changchun, Jilin, China

Sport
- Sport: Skiing
- Club: Chinese Ski Association

World Cup career
- Seasons: 2012–2014; 2016–present
- Indiv. starts: 47
- Team starts: 1
- Updated on 13 March 2026

Li Xueyao (Chinese: 李雪尧, born 11 April 1995) is a Chinese ski jumper. Born to a father who did luohanquan martial arts, she began ski jumping at age 11 under the coaching of Wang Jianxun.

== World Cup ==
=== Standings ===
Season	Overall	ST	AK	L3	RA	BB
2011/12	—	N/A	N/A	N/A	N/A	N/A
2012/13	—	N/A	N/A	N/A	N/A	N/A
2013/14	—	N/A	N/A	N/A	N/A	N/A
2014/15	—	N/A	N/A	N/A	N/A	N/A
2015/16	—	N/A	N/A	N/A	N/A	N/A
2016/17	—	N/A	N/A	N/A	N/A	N/A
2017/18	41	N/A	N/A	39	N/A	N/A
2018/19	36	N/A	N/A	33	—	—
2019/20	38	N/A	N/A	N/A	—	N/A
2021/22	—	—	51	N/A	—	N/A

=== Individual starts (47) ===
Season	1	2	3	4	5	6	7	8	9	10	11	12	13	14	15	16	17	18	19	20	21	22	23	24	25	26	Points
2011/12	Lillehammer	Hinterzten	Hinterzten	Val di Fiemme	Val di Fiemme	Hinzenbach	Hinzenbach	Ljubno	Ljubno	Zaō Onsen	Zaō Onsen	Zaō Onsen	Oslo														0
2011/12	–	–	–	DN	–	–	–	44	–	–	–	–	–														0
2012/13	Lillehammer	Sochi	Sochi	Ramsau am Dachstein	Schonach	Schonach	Hinterzten	Hinterzten	Sapporo	Sapporo	Zaō Onsen	Zaō Onsen	Ljubno	Ljubno	Trondheim	Oslo											0
2012/13	–	–	–	–	–	–	–	–	–	–	–	–	37	37	47	–											0
2013/14	Lillehammer	Hinterzten	Hinterzten	Chaykovsky, Perm Krai	Chaykovsky, Perm Krai	Sapporo	Sapporo	Zaō Onsen	Zaō Onsen	Planica	Planica	Hinzenbach	Hinzenbach	Râșnov	Râșnov	Oslo	Falun	Planica									0
2013/14	q	41	45	39	41	–	–	–	–	–	–	–	–	–	–	–	–	–									0
2015/16	Lillehammer	Nizhny Tagil	Nizhny Tagil	Sapporo	Sapporo	Zaō Onsen	Zaō Onsen	Oberstdorf	Oberstdorf	Oslo	Hinzenbach	Hinzenbach	Ljubno	Ljubno	Lahti	Almaty	Almaty										0
2015/16	q	–	–	q	q	37	36	q	q	–	–	–	–	–	–	–	–										0
2016/17	Lillehammer	Lillehammer	Nizhny Tagil	Nizhny Tagil	Oberstdorf	Oberstdorf	Sapporo	Sapporo	Zaō Onsen	Zaō Onsen	Râșnov	Râșnov	Hinzenbach	Hinzenbach	Ljubno	Ljubno	Pyeongchang	Pyeongchang	Oslo								8
2016/17	q	q	–	–	–	–	q	q	q	q	35	33	37	37	35	23	–	–	–								8
2017/18	Lillehammer	Lillehammer	Lillehammer	Hinterzarten	Sapporo	Sapporo	Zaō Onsen	Zaō Onsen	Ljubno	Ljubno	Râșnov	Râșnov	Oslo	Oberstdorf	Oberstdorf												22
2017/18	q	38	–	34	25	26	24	32	30	28	–	–	–	–	–												22
2018/19	Lillehammer	Lillehammer	Lillehammer	Prémanon	Prémanon	Sapporo	Sapporo	Zaō Onsen	Zaō Onsen	Râșnov	Râșnov	Hinzenbach	Hinzenbach	Ljubno	Ljubno	Oberstdorf	Oberstdorf	Oslo	Lillehammer	Trondheim	Nizhny Tagil	Nizhny Tagil	Chaykovsky, Perm Krai	Chaykovsky, Perm Krai			57
2018/19	28	34	38	24	24	20	30	26	37	17	24	33	29	–	–	–	–	–	–	–	–	–	–	–			57
2019/20	Lillehammer	Lillehammer	Klingenthal	Sapporo	Sapporo	Zaō Onsen	Zaō Onsen	Râșnov	Râșnov	Oberstdorf	Oberstdorf	Hinzenbach	Hinzenbach	Ljubno ob Savinji	Oslo	Lillehammer											21
2019/20	q	25	39	–	–	–	–	26	33	38	33	27	36	25	–	–											21
2021–22	Nizhny Tagil	Nizhny Tagil	Lillehammer	Lillehammer	Klingenthal	Klingenthal	Ramsau am Dachstein	Ljubno ob Savinji	Ljubno ob Savinji	Willingen	Willingen	Hinzenbach	Hinzenbach	Lillehammer	Oslo	Oslo	Oberhof	Oberhof									0
2021–22	q	q	–	–	q	q	34	q	–	–	–	–	–	–	–	–	–	–									0
