= Ingo Lesser =

German ski jumper

Personal information
- Full name: Ingo Lesser
- Born: Brotterode, East Germany

Sport
- Sport: Skiing

World Cup career
- Seasons: 1987; 1989–1992
- Indiv. podiums: 1
- Updated on 30 Mar 2015

Ingo Lesser is an East German and later German former ski jumper.
