= Anastasiya Barannikova =

Russian ski jumper (born 1987)

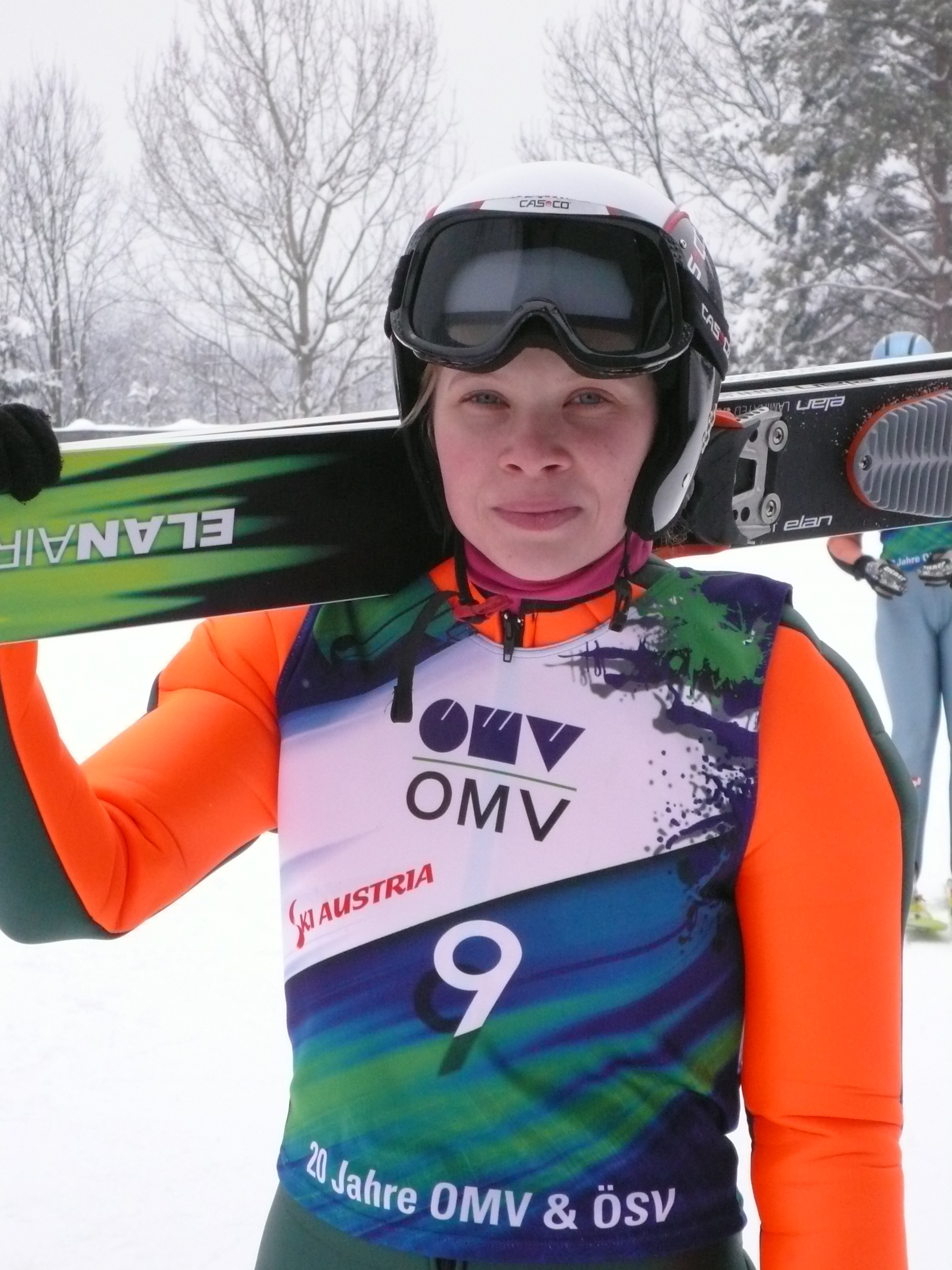
- Barannikova in Villach, 2010

Personal information
- Full name: Anastasiya Anatolievna Barannikova
- Nationality: Russia
- Born: 27 November 1987 (age 38) Perm, Russia

Sport
- Sport: Skiing
- Club: SDUSSHOR Start SCT Berez

World Cup career
- Seasons: 2012–2018
- Indiv. starts: 94
- Team starts: 2
- Team podiums: 2
- Updated on 23 May 2023

Anastasiya Anatolievna Barannikova (née Gladysheva; born 27 November 1987) is a Russian former ski jumper. She competed at World Cup level from the 2011–12 season to the 2017–18 season, with her best individual results being ninth place in Lillehammer on 6 December 2013, and in Nizhy Tagil on 12 December 2015; her best team finish is third in Zaō on 20 January 2018.
