= Vladěna Pustková =

Czech ski jumper

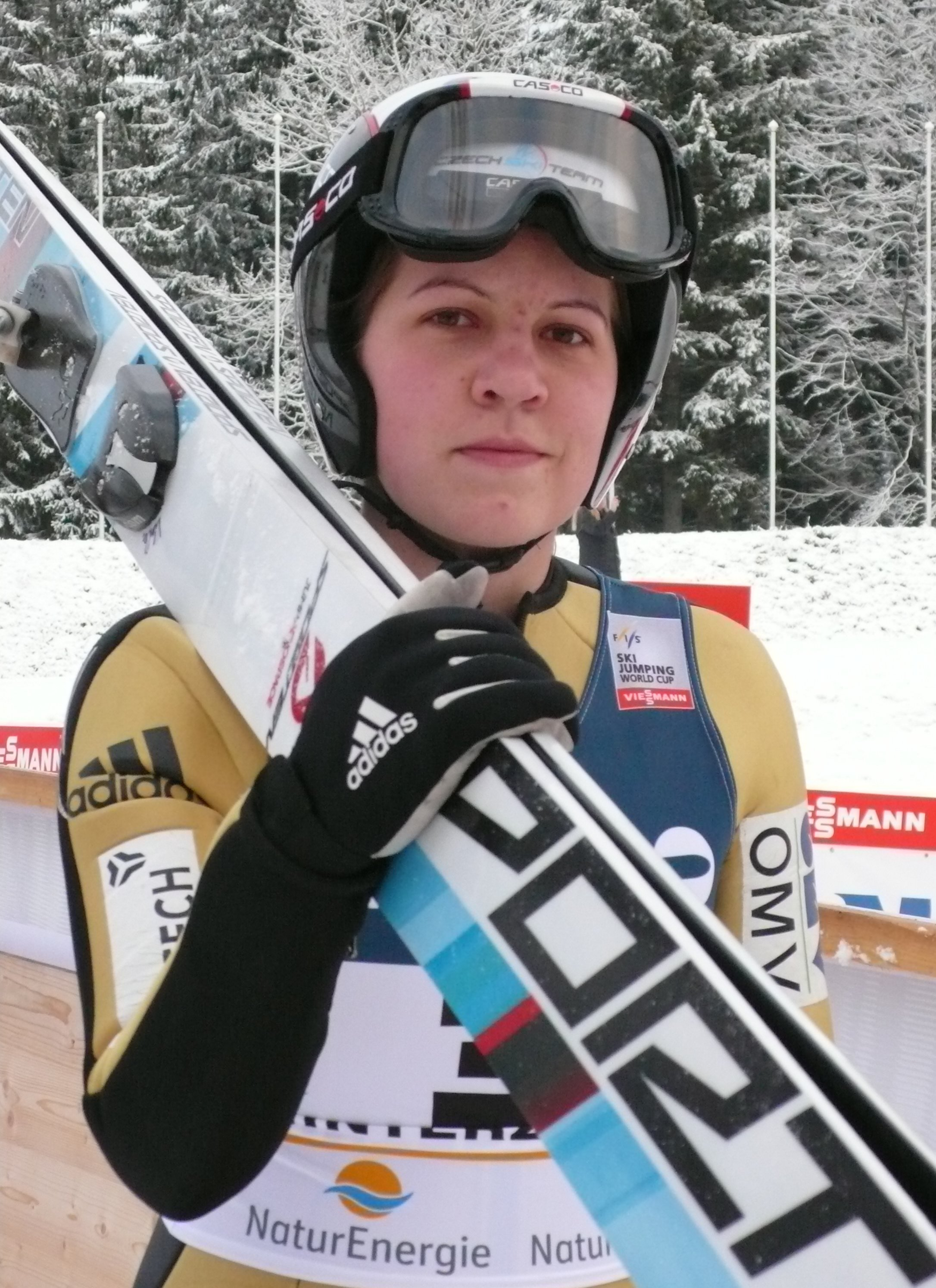

Personal information
- Nationality: Czech Republic
- Born: 11 July 1992 (age 34) Čeladná, Czechoslovakia

Sport
- Sport: Skiing
- Club: Sokol Kozlovice

World Cup career
- Seasons: 2012–present

Vladěna Pustková (born 11 July 1992) is a Czech ski jumper. She participated in the FIS Ski Jumping Continental Cup between the 2004–05 and 2011–12 seasons, before moving up to the FIS Ski Jumping World Cup, which she contested in 2011–12, 2012–13 and 2013–14. She was part of the Czech team which finished last in the FIS Nordic World Ski Championships 2013 – Mixed team normal hill event.
