= 2015 Winter Universiade =

Multi-sport event in Spain and Slovakia

XXVII Winter Universiade XXVII Universiada de invierno XXVII Zimná univerziáda
- Host city: Granada, Spain; Štrbské Pleso, Slovakia (Nordic & Biathlon)
- Nations: 30 (SVK); 34 (ESP)
- Athletes: 1,551
- Events: 68 in 11 sports
- Opening: 24 January 2015 (Nordic & biathlon); 4 February 2015
- Closing: 1 February 2015 (Nordic & biathlon); 14 February 2015
- Opened by: Andrej Kiska and Sebastian Pérez Ortiz
- Athlete's Oath: Sara Hurtado
- Judge's Oath: José Cervi
- Torch lighter: Pavol Hurajt (Slovakia); Patricia Muñoz (Spain)
- Main venue: Štrbské Pleso (Slovakia); Palacio de Congresos (Opening); Palacio Municipal de Deportes de Granada (Closing)
- Website: granada2015.org (archived)

Winter

Summer

The 2015 Winter Universiade, the XXVII Winter Universiade, was a multi-sport winter event with the host duties shared by Granada, Spain and Štrbské Pleso, Slovakia. On 14 March 2009, FISU announced that the host would be Granada because they were the only bid.

On 25 June 2014, after Granada announced that it could not host cross-country skiing events for environmental and logistical reasons, FISU announced that Slovakia was invited to be a co-host of the 2015 Winter Universiade. FISU approved moving cross-country skiing and biathlon events to Štrbské Pleso and Osrblie in Slovakia.Due local demands, Slovakia was allowed to add another two sports to the program: Nordic combined and ski jumping.

== Sports ==
Four sports took place in Slovakia, from January 24 – February 1. From February 4 – 14, the other sports were contested in Granada.

=== Granada ===
- Alpine skiing (10)
- Curling (2)
- Figure skating (4)
- Freestyle skiing (8)
- Ice hockey (2)
- Short track speed skating (8)
- Snowboarding (8)

=== Slovakia ===
- Biathlon (9)
- Cross-country skiing (9)
- Nordic combined (3)
- Ski jumping (5)

== Schedule ==
The competition schedule for the 2015 Winter Universiade is shown as follows:

=== Štrbské Pleso/Osrblie ===
OC	Opening ceremony	1	Event finals	CC	Closing ceremony

January/February	24 Sat	25 Sun	26 Mon	27 Tue	28 Wed	29 Thu	30 Fri	31 Sat	01 Sun	Events
Ceremonies	OC								CC	
Biathlon		2		2	2		1	2		9
Cross-country skiing		2	1		2		2	1	1	9
Nordic combined			1			1		1		3
Ski jumping				2		1	1		1	5
Total events		4	2	4	4	2	4	4	2	26
Cumulative total		4	6	10	14	16	20	24	26	
January/February	24 Sat	25 Sun	26 Mon	27 Tue	28 Wed	29 Thu	30 Fri	31 Sat	01 Sun	Events

=== Granada ===
OC	Opening ceremony	●	Event competitions	1	Event finals	EG	Exhibition gala	CC	Closing ceremony

February	03 Tue	04 Wed	05 Thu	06 Fri	07 Sat	08 Sun	09 Mon	10 Tue	11 Wed	12 Thu	13 Fri	14 Sat	Events
Ceremonies		OC										CC	
Alpine skiing				2	1	1			1	1	2	2	10
Curling			●	●	●	●	●	●	●	●	2		2
Figure skating		●	1	1	1	1/EG							4
Freestyle skiing			2				2	●	2		2		8
Ice hockey	●	●	●	●	●	●	●	●	●	1	●	1	2
Short track speed skating									2	2	4		8
Snowboarding				2	2			2			2		8
Total events			3	5	4	2	2	2	5	4	12	3	42
Cumulative total			3	8	12	14	16	18	23	27	39	42	
February	03 Tue	04 Wed	05 Thu	06 Fri	07 Sat	08 Sun	09 Mon	10 Tue	11 Wed	12 Thu	13 Fri	14 Sat	Events

== Venues ==
=== Granada ===
- Palacio de Exposiciones y Congresos de Granada — opening ceremony
- Palacio Municipal de Deportes de Granada — men's ice hockey and closing ceremony
- Pabellón de Mulhacén — women's ice hockey
- Pabellón de Universiada — curling
- Sierra Nevada Ski Station - alpine skiing
- Universiade Igloo - figure skating and short track speed skating

=== Štrbské Pleso and Osrblie, Slovakia ===
- Štrbské Pleso - cross country skiing, Nordic combined and ski jumping, opening and closing ceremonies
- Osrblie - biathlon

== Participants ==
Following is a list of nations that entered athletes at the Universiade:

- Andorra (9)
- Australia (13)
- Austria (37)
- Belarus (15)
- Belgium (3)
- Bulgaria (4)
- Canada (82)
- China (94)
- Croatia (4)
- Czech Republic (71)
- Estonia (6)
- Finland (33)
- France (60)
- Georgia (6)
- Germany (20)
- Great Britain (15)
- Hong Kong (2)
- Hungary (4)
- Italy (39)
- Japan (97)
- Kazakhstan (89)
- Kyrgyzstan (4)
- Latvia (7)
- Lithuania (6)
- Mexico (2)
- Mongolia (6)
- Netherlands (6)
- New Zealand (1)
- Norway (33)
- Poland (72)
- Russia (178)
- Singapore (1)
- Slovakia (56) (co-host)
- Slovenia (17)
- South Africa (1)
- South Korea (86)
- Spain (78) (co-host)
- Sweden (42)
- Switzerland (51)
- Turkey (24)
- Ukraine (51)
- United States (117)

== Medal table ==
* Host nations (Spain, Slovakia)

Rank	Nation	Gold	Silver	Bronze	Total
1	Russia (RUS)	20	18	18	56
2	South Korea (KOR)	5	9	2	16
3	Kazakhstan (KAZ)	5	6	0	11
4	Switzerland (SUI)	5	1	4	10
5	China (CHN)	5	0	4	9
6	Norway (NOR)	5	0	1	6
7	Germany (GER)	3	4	1	8
8	Czech Republic (CZE)	3	3	5	11
9	Italy (ITA)	3	2	2	7
10	Japan (JPN)	2	5	2	9
11	Poland (POL)	2	4	4	10
12	United States (USA)	2	3	3	8
13	Austria (AUT)	2	1	2	5
13	Ukraine (UKR)	2	1	2	5
15	Bulgaria (BUL)	2	0	0	2
16	Slovakia (SVK)*	1	3	4	8
17	France (FRA)	1	2	6	9
18	Canada (CAN)	0	2	3	5
19	Andorra (AND)	0	2	1	3
20	Spain (ESP)*	0	2	0	2
21	Great Britain (GBR)	0	0	1	1
21	Lithuania (LTU)	0	0	1	1
21	Slovenia (SLO)	0	0	1	1
21	Sweden (SWE)	0	0	1	1
Totals (24 entries)		68	68	68	204
