= Short-track speed skating at the 2011 Asian Winter Games =

- Venue: Saryarka Velodrome
- Dates: 31 January – 2 February 2011
- Competitors: 56 from 9 nations

Short-track speed skating at the 2011 Asian Winter Games was held at Saryarka Velodrome in Astana, Kazakhstan. The eight events were scheduled for January 31– February 2, 2011.

== Schedule ==
H	Heats	S	Semifinals	F	Finals

Event↓/Date →	31st Mon		1st Tue			2nd Wed		
Men's 500 m			H	S	F			
Men's 1000 m						H	S	F
Men's 1500 m	H	F						
Men's 5000 m relay			H			F		
Women's 500 m			H	S	F			
Women's 1000 m						H	S	F
Women's 1500 m	H	F						
Women's 3000 m relay			H			F		

== Medalists ==
=== Men ===
Event	Gold	Silver	Bronze
500 m	Liang Wenhao; China	Takahiro Fujimoto; Japan	Ryosuke Sakazume; Japan
1000 m	Song Weilong; China	Daisuke Uemura; Japan	Sung Si-bak; South Korea
1500 m	Noh Jin-kyu; South Korea	Um Cheon-ho; South Korea	Liu Xianwei; China
5000 m relay	South Korea; Lee Ho-suk; Noh Jin-kyu; Sung Si-bak; Kim Byeong-jun; Um Cheon-ho	Japan; Yuzo Takamido; Daisuke Uemura; Ryosuke Sakazume; Takahiro Fujimoto	Kazakhstan; Aidar Bekzhanov; Artur Sultangaliyev; Nurbergen Zhumagaziyev; Abzal Azhgaliyev; Fedor Andreyev

=== Women ===
Event	Gold	Silver	Bronze
500 m	Liu Qiuhong; China	Fan Kexin; China	Yui Sakai; Japan
1000 m	Park Seung-hi; South Korea	Cho Ha-ri; South Korea	Liu Qiuhong; China
1500 m	Cho Ha-ri; South Korea	Park Seung-hi; South Korea	Biba Sakurai; Japan
3000 m relay	China; Zhou Yang; Liu Qiuhong; Fan Kexin; Zhang Hui; Zhao Nannan	South Korea; Park Seung-hi; Cho Ha-ri; Yang Shin-young; Hwang Hyun-sun; Kim Dam-min	Kazakhstan; Inna Simonova; Xeniya Motova; Darya Volokitina; Anna Samarina

== Medal table ==
Rank	Nation	Gold	Silver	Bronze	Total
1	South Korea (KOR)	4	4	1	9
2	China (CHN)	4	1	2	7
3	Japan (JPN)	0	3	3	6
4	Kazakhstan (KAZ)	0	0	2	2
Totals (4 entries)		8	8	8	24

== Participating nations ==
A total of 56 athletes from 9 nations competed in short-track speed skating at the 2011 Asian Winter Games:

- China (10)
- Chinese Taipei (8)
- Hong Kong (2)
- Japan (9)
- Kazakhstan (9)
- Mongolia (2)
- North Korea (5)
- Singapore (1)
- South Korea (10)
