= Cross-country skiing at the 2011 Asian Winter Games =

- Venue: Biathlon and Cross-Country Ski Complex
- Dates: 31 January – 6 February 2011
- Competitors: 44 from 7 nations

Cross-country skiing at the 2011 Asian Winter Games was held at the Biathlon and Cross-Country Ski Complex in Almaty, Kazakhstan. The twelve events were scheduled for January 31 – February 6, 2011.

== Schedule ==
Q	Qualification	F	Final

Event↓/Date →	31st Mon		1st Tue	2nd Wed	3rd Thu	4th Fri	5th Sat	6th Sun
Men's sprint classical	Q	F						
Men's team sprint freestyle			F					
Men's 10 km classical					F			
Men's 15 km freestyle				F				
Men's 30 km classical								F
Men's 4 × 10 km relay							F	
Women's sprint classical	Q	F						
Women's team sprint freestyle			F					
Women's 5 km classical					F			
Women's 10 km freestyle				F				
Women's 15 km classical								F
Women's 4 × 5 km relay							F	

== Medalists ==
=== Men ===
Event	Gold	Silver	Bronze
Sprint classical	Alexey Poltoranin; Kazakhstan	Nikolay Chebotko; Kazakhstan	Yuichi Onda; Japan
Team sprint freestyle	Kazakhstan; Alexey Poltoranin; Nikolay Chebotko	Japan; Masaya Kimura; Nobu Naruse	South Korea; Park Byung-joo; Jung Eui-myung
10 km classical	Keishin Yoshida; Japan	Nikolay Chebotko; Kazakhstan	Alexey Poltoranin; Kazakhstan
15 km freestyle	Keishin Yoshida; Japan	Nobu Naruse; Japan	Nikolay Chebotko; Kazakhstan
30 km classical	Alexey Poltoranin; Kazakhstan	Sergey Cherepanov; Kazakhstan	Keishin Yoshida; Japan
4 × 10 km relay	Kazakhstan; Sergey Cherepanov; Alexey Poltoranin; Nikolay Chebotko; Yevgeniy Velichko	Japan; Kohei Shimizu; Keishin Yoshida; Masaya Kimura; Nobu Naruse	South Korea; Im Yeui-gyu; Ha Tae-bok; Lee Jun-gil; Park Byung-joo

=== Women ===
Event	Gold	Silver	Bronze
Sprint classical	Madoka Natsumi; Japan	Yelena Kolomina; Kazakhstan	Oxana Yatskaya; Kazakhstan
Team sprint freestyle	Kazakhstan; Oxana Yatskaya; Yelena Kolomina	China; Man Dandan; Li Hongxue	Japan; Naoko Omori; Yuki Kobayashi
5 km classical	Masako Ishida; Japan	Madoka Natsumi; Japan	Li Hongxue; China
10 km freestyle	Lee Chae-won; South Korea	Masako Ishida; Japan	Yuki Kobayashi; Japan
15 km classical	Masako Ishida; Japan	Yelena Kolomina; Kazakhstan	Svetlana Malahova-Shishkina; Kazakhstan
4 × 5 km relay	Kazakhstan; Yelena Kolomina; Oxana Yatskaya; Anastassiya Slonova; Svetlana Malahova-Shishkina	Japan; Madoka Natsumi; Masako Ishida; Yuki Kobayashi; Michiko Kashiwabara	China; Man Dandan; Li Hongxue; Li Xin; Liu Yuanyuan

== Medal table ==
Rank	Nation	Gold	Silver	Bronze	Total
1	Kazakhstan (KAZ)	6	5	4	15
2	Japan (JPN)	5	6	4	15
3	South Korea (KOR)	1	0	2	3
4	China (CHN)	0	1	2	3
Totals (4 entries)		12	12	12	36

== Participating nations ==
A total of 44 athletes from 7 nations competed in cross-country skiing at the 2011 Asian Winter Games:

- Afghanistan (1)
- China (5)
- India (8)
- Iran (3)
- Japan (10)
- Kazakhstan (8)
- South Korea (9)
