= Speed skating at the 2011 Asian Winter Games =

- Venue: Alau Ice Palace
- Dates: 31 January – 6 February 2011
- Competitors: 61 from 7 nations

Speed skating at the 2011 Asian Winter Games was held at Alau Ice Palace in Astana, Kazakhstan. The twelve events were scheduled for January 31 – February 6, 2011.

== Schedule ==
F	Final

Event↓/Date →	31st Mon	1st Tue	2nd Wed	3rd Thu	4th Fri	5th Sat	6th Sun
Men's 500 m		F					
Men's 1500 m					F		
Men's 5000 m	F						
Men's 10000 m						F	
Men's mass start			F				
Men's team pursuit							F
Women's 500 m		F					
Women's 1500 m					F		
Women's 3000 m	F						
Women's 5000 m						F	
Women's mass start			F				
Women's team pursuit							F

== Medalists ==
=== Men ===
Event	Gold	Silver	Bronze
500 m	Joji Kato; Japan	Lee Kang-seok; South Korea	Keiichiro Nagashima; Japan
1500 m	Denis Kuzin; Kazakhstan	Mo Tae-bum; South Korea	Lee Kyou-hyuk; South Korea
5000 m	Lee Seung-hoon; South Korea	Dmitriy Babenko; Kazakhstan	Hiroki Hirako; Japan
10000 m	Lee Seung-hoon; South Korea	Dmitriy Babenko; Kazakhstan	Hiroki Hirako; Japan
Mass start	Lee Seung-hoon; South Korea	Hiroki Hirako; Japan	Dmitriy Babenko; Kazakhstan
Team pursuit	Japan; Hiroki Hirako; Teppei Mori; Shota Nakamura	South Korea; Lee Kyou-hyuk; Lee Seung-hoon; Mo Tae-bum	Kazakhstan; Dmitriy Babenko; Artem Beloussov; Alexandr Zhigin

=== Women ===
Event	Gold	Silver	Bronze
500 m	Yu Jing; China	Wang Beixing; China	Lee Sang-hwa; South Korea
1500 m	Wang Fei; China	Noh Seon-yeong; South Korea	Nao Kodaira; Japan
3000 m	Masako Hozumi; Japan	Kim Bo-reum; South Korea	Wang Fei; China
5000 m	Masako Hozumi; Japan	Park Do-yeong; South Korea	Eriko Ishino; Japan
Mass start	Noh Seon-yeong; South Korea	Masako Hozumi; Japan	Lee Ju-yeon; South Korea
Team pursuit	South Korea; Lee Ju-yeon; Noh Seon-yeong; Park Do-yeong	China; Fu Chunyan; Ji Jia; Wang Fei	Japan; Eriko Ishino; Shiho Ishizawa; Miho Takagi

== Medal table ==
Rank	Nation	Gold	Silver	Bronze	Total
1	South Korea (KOR)	5	6	3	14
2	Japan (JPN)	4	2	6	12
3	China (CHN)	2	2	1	5
4	Kazakhstan (KAZ)	1	2	2	5
Totals (4 entries)		12	12	12	36

== Participating nations ==
A total of 61 athletes from 7 nations competed in speed skating at the 2011 Asian Winter Games:

- China (14)
- Japan (13)
- Kazakhstan (12)
- Mongolia (3)
- North Korea (2)
- Qatar (4)
- South Korea (13)
