= Short-track speed skating at the 2011 Asian Winter Games – Men's 500 metres =

Men's 500 metres at the 2011 Asian Winter Games
- Venue: Saryarka Velodrome
- Dates: 1 February 2011
- Competitors: 13 from 8 nations

Medalists
gold medal	Liang Wenhao	China
silver medal	Takahiro Fujimoto	Japan
bronze medal	Ryosuke Sakazume	Japan

The men's 500 metres at the 2011 Asian Winter Games was held on February 1, 2011 in Astana, Kazakhstan.

== Schedule ==
All times are Almaty Time (UTC+06:00)

Date	Time	Event
Tuesday, 1 February 2011	14:00	Heats
Tuesday, 1 February 2011	14:24	Semifinals
Tuesday, 1 February 2011	14:40	Finals

== Results ==
Legend

- PEN — Penalty

=== Heats ===
- Qualification: 1–2 → Semifinals (Q)

==== Heat 1 ====
Rank	Athlete	Time	Notes
1	Lee Ho-suk (KOR)	42.325	Q
2	Takahiro Fujimoto (JPN)	42.725	Q
3	Yang Bo-kai (TPE)	1:01.425	

==== Heat 2 ====
Rank	Athlete	Time	Notes
1	Liang Wenhao (CHN)	42.057	Q
2	Aidar Bekzhanov (KAZ)	43.748	Q
3	Barton Lui (HKG)	1:18.040	

==== Heat 3 ====
Rank	Athlete	Time	Notes
1	Ryosuke Sakazume (JPN)	43.470	Q
2	Tsai Yu-lun (TPE)	47.593	Q
3	Lucas Ng (SIN)	50.124	
4	Kim Byeong-jun (KOR)	1:14.302	

==== Heat 4 ====
Rank	Athlete	Time	Notes
1	Han Jialiang (CHN)	42.534	Q
2	Artur Sultangaliyev (KAZ)	43.782	Q
3	Ganbatyn Mönkh-Amidral (MGL)	1:15.295	

=== Semifinals ===
- Qualification: 1–2 → Final A (QA), 3–4 → Final B (QB)

==== Heat 1 ====
Rank	Athlete	Time	Notes
1	Liang Wenhao (CHN)	41.999	QA
2	Ryosuke Sakazume (JPN)	42.563	QA
3	Aidar Bekzhanov (KAZ)	42.675	QB
4	Tsai Yu-lun (TPE)	46.014	QB

==== Heat 2 ====
Rank	Athlete	Time	Notes
1	Lee Ho-suk (KOR)	42.366	QA
2	Takahiro Fujimoto (JPN)	42.551	QA
3	Artur Sultangaliyev (KAZ)	43.425	QB
4	Han Jialiang (CHN)	43.645	QB

=== Finals ===
==== Final B ====
Rank	Athlete	Time
1	Han Jialiang (CHN)	42.936
2	Artur Sultangaliyev (KAZ)	43.021
3	Aidar Bekzhanov (KAZ)	45.369
4	Tsai Yu-lun (TPE)	45.889

==== Final A ====
Rank	Athlete	Time
1st place, gold medalist(s)	Liang Wenhao (CHN)	41.983
2nd place, silver medalist(s)	Takahiro Fujimoto (JPN)	42.124
3rd place, bronze medalist(s)	Ryosuke Sakazume (JPN)	42.543
—	Lee Ho-suk (KOR)	PEN
