= Short-track speed skating at the 2011 Asian Winter Games – Men's 1000 metres =

Men's 1000 metres at the 2011 Asian Winter Games
- Venue: Saryarka Velodrome
- Dates: 2 February 2011
- Competitors: 13 from 8 nations

Medalists
gold medal	Song Weilong	China
silver medal	Daisuke Uemura	Japan
bronze medal	Sung Si-bak	South Korea

The men's 1000 metres at the 2011 Asian Winter Games was held on February 2, 2011, in Astana, Kazakhstan.

== Schedule ==
All times are Almaty Time (UTC+06:00)

Date	Time	Event
Wednesday, 2 February 2011	14:16	Heats
Wednesday, 2 February 2011	14:40	Semifinals
Wednesday, 2 February 2011	14:56	Finals

== Results ==
Legend

- PEN — Penalty

=== Heats ===
- Qualification: 1–2 → Semifinals (Q)

==== Heat 1 ====
Rank	Athlete	Time	Notes
1	Han Jialiang (CHN)	1:31.731	Q
2	Artur Sultangaliyev (KAZ)	1:33.467	Q
3	Yang Shun-fan (TPE)	1:33.825	

==== Heat 2 ====
Rank	Athlete	Time	Notes
1	Song Weilong (CHN)	1:27.741	Q
2	Yuzo Takamido (JPN)	1:27.756	Q
3	Um Cheon-ho (KOR)	1:27.870	

==== Heat 3 ====
Rank	Athlete	Time	Notes
1	Daisuke Uemura (JPN)	1:30.112	Q
2	Nurbergen Zhumagaziyev (KAZ)	1:31.638	Q
3	Wang Yang-chun (TPE)	1:32.871	
4	Lucas Ng (SIN)	1:40.220	

==== Heat 4 ====
Rank	Athlete	Time	Notes
1	Sung Si-bak (KOR)	1:38.890	Q
2	Barton Lui (HKG)	1:39.964	Q
3	Ganbatyn Mönkh-Amidral (MGL)	1:41.121	

=== Semifinals ===
- Qualification: 1–2 → Final A (QA), 3–4 → Final B (QB)

==== Heat 1 ====
Rank	Athlete	Time	Notes
1	Han Jialiang (CHN)	1:30.838	QA
2	Daisuke Uemura (JPN)	1:31.143	QA
3	Nurbergen Zhumagaziyev (KAZ)	1:31.563	QB
4	Barton Lui (HKG)	1:31.992	QB

==== Heat 2 ====
Rank	Athlete	Time	Notes
1	Sung Si-bak (KOR)	1:27.368	QA
2	Song Weilong (CHN)	1:27.544	QA
3	Yuzo Takamido (JPN)	1:27.811	QB
4	Artur Sultangaliyev (KAZ)	1:31.223	QB

=== Finals ===
==== Final B ====
Rank	Athlete	Time
1	Yuzo Takamido (JPN)	1:36.834
2	Artur Sultangaliyev (KAZ)	1:37.270
3	Barton Lui (HKG)	1:37.448
4	Nurbergen Zhumagaziyev (KAZ)	1:38.033

==== Final A ====
Rank	Athlete	Time
1st place, gold medalist(s)	Song Weilong (CHN)	1:29.353
2nd place, silver medalist(s)	Daisuke Uemura (JPN)	2:00.916
3rd place, bronze medalist(s)	Sung Si-bak (KOR)	2:41.236
—	Han Jialiang (CHN)	PEN
