= Figure skating at the 2011 Asian Winter Games =

- Venue: Saryarka Velodrome
- Dates: 3–5 February 2011
- Competitors: 49 from 12 nations

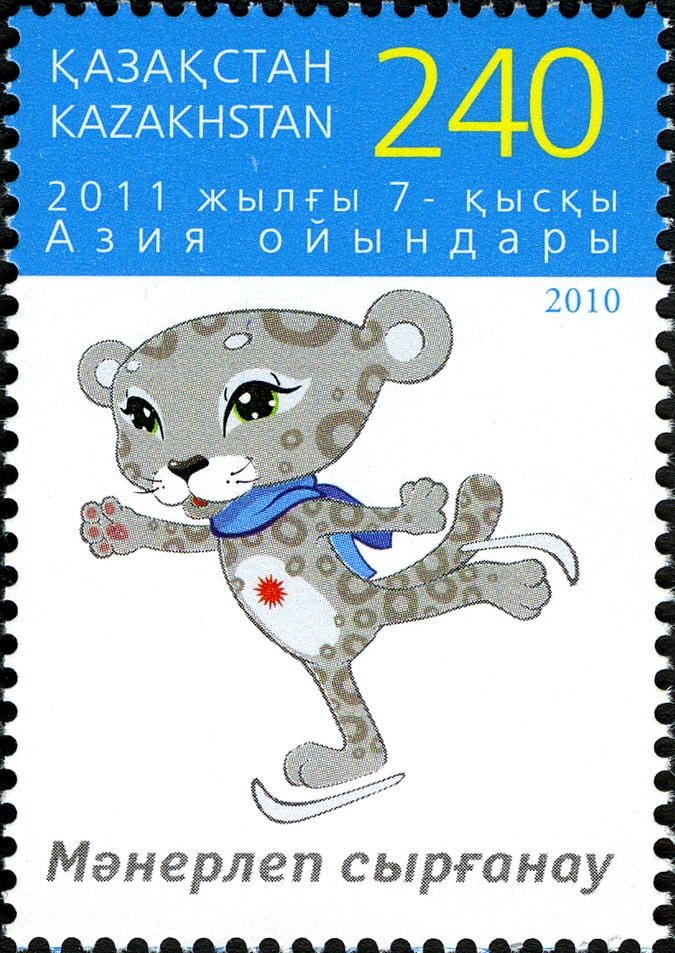

Figure skating was featured as part of the 2011 Asian Winter Games at the Saryarka Velodrome in Astana, Kazakhstan. Events were held on between the third and fifth of February 2011. Skaters competed in four disciplines: men's singles, ladies' singles, pairs, and ice dance.

== Schedule ==
S	Short program	F	Free skating

Event↓/Date →	3rd Thu	4th Fri	5th Sat
Men's singles	S	F	
Women's singles		S	F
Pairs	S		F
Ice dance	S		F

== Medalists ==
Event	Gold	Silver	Bronze
Men's singles	Denis Ten; Kazakhstan	Takahito Mura; Japan	Song Nan; China
Women's singles	Kanako Murakami; Japan	Haruka Imai; Japan	Kwak Min-jeong; South Korea
Pairs	China; Tong Jian; Pang Qing	China; Han Cong; Sui Wenjing	North Korea; Thae Won-hyok; Ri Ji-hyang
Ice dance	China; Zheng Xun; Huang Xintong	Japan; Chris Reed; Cathy Reed	China; Wang Chen; Yu Xiaoyang

== Medal table ==
Rank	Nation	Gold	Silver	Bronze	Total
1	China (CHN)	2	1	2	5
2	Japan (JPN)	1	3	0	4
3	Kazakhstan (KAZ)	1	0	0	1
4	North Korea (PRK)	0	0	1	1
4	South Korea (KOR)	0	0	1	1
Totals (5 entries)		4	4	4	12

== Participating nations ==
A total of 49 athletes from 12 nations competed in figure skating at the 2011 Asian Winter Games:

- China (12)
- Chinese Taipei (3)
- Hong Kong (1)
- Japan (6)
- Kazakhstan (8)
- Malaysia (2)
- Mongolia (1)
- North Korea (5)
- Philippines (3)
- South Korea (3)
- Thailand (3)
- Uzbekistan (2)
