= Short-track speed skating at the 2011 Asian Winter Games – Men's 1500 metres =

Men's 1500 metres at the 2011 Asian Winter Games
- Venue: Saryarka Velodrome
- Dates: 31 January 2011
- Competitors: 12 from 7 nations

Medalists
gold medal	Noh Jin-kyu	South Korea
silver medal	Um Cheon-ho	South Korea
bronze medal	Liu Xianwei	China

The men's 1500 metres at the 2011 Asian Winter Games was held on January 31, 2011 in Astana, Kazakhstan.

== Schedule ==
All times are Almaty Time (UTC+06:00)

Date	Time	Event
Monday, 31 January 2011	14:15	Heats
Monday, 31 January 2011	14:35	Finals

== Results ==
Legend

- DNS — Did not start
- PEN — Penalty

=== Heats ===
- Qualification: 1–3 → Final A (QA), 4–6 → Final B (QB)

==== Heat 1 ====
Rank	Athlete	Time	Notes
1	Song Weilong (CHN)	2:32.185	QA
2	Noh Jin-kyu (KOR)	2:32.196	QA
3	Daisuke Uemura (JPN)	2:32.728	QA
4	Nurbergen Zhumagaziyev (KAZ)	2:50.300	QB
5	Wang Yang-chun (TPE)	2:50.415	QB
—	Ganbatyn Mönkh-Amidral (MGL)	PEN	

==== Heat 2 ====
Rank	Athlete	Time	Notes
1	Yuzo Takamido (JPN)	2:19.707	QA
2	Liu Xianwei (CHN)	2:20.152	QA
3	Um Cheon-ho (KOR)	2:20.258	QA
4	Aidar Bekzhanov (KAZ)	2:22.984	QB
5	Barton Lui (HKG)	2:23.278	QB
6	Yang Shun-fan (TPE)	2:25.039	QB

=== Finals ===
==== Final B ====
Rank	Athlete	Time
1	Nurbergen Zhumagaziyev (KAZ)	2:42.007
2	Barton Lui (HKG)	2:42.857
3	Wang Yang-chun (TPE)	2:43.015
4	Yang Shun-fan (TPE)	2:44.000
—	Aidar Bekzhanov (KAZ)	DNS

==== Final A ====
Rank	Athlete	Time
1st place, gold medalist(s)	Noh Jin-kyu (KOR)	2:18.998
2nd place, silver medalist(s)	Um Cheon-ho (KOR)	2:19.337
3rd place, bronze medalist(s)	Liu Xianwei (CHN)	2:19.622
4	Daisuke Uemura (JPN)	2:20.270
5	Yuzo Takamido (JPN)	2:20.365
—	Song Weilong (CHN)	PEN
