= Short-track speed skating at the 2011 Asian Winter Games – Women's 1000 metres =

Women's 1000 metres at the 2011 Asian Winter Games
- Venue: Saryarka Velodrome
- Dates: 2 February 2011
- Competitors: 13 from 8 nations

Medalists
gold medal	Park Seung-hi	South Korea
silver medal	Cho Ha-ri	South Korea
bronze medal	Liu Qiuhong	China

The women's 1000 metres at the 2011 Asian Winter Games was held on February 2, 2011 in Astana, Kazakhstan.

== Schedule ==
All times are Almaty Time (UTC+06:00)

Date	Time	Event
Wednesday, 2 February 2011	14:00	Heats
Wednesday, 2 February 2011	14:32	Semifinals
Wednesday, 2 February 2011	14:48	Finals

== Results ==
=== Heats ===
- Qualification: 1–2 → Semifinals (Q)

==== Heat 1 ====
Rank	Athlete	Time	Notes
1	Cho Ha-ri (KOR)	1:50.875	Q
2	Yui Sakai (JPN)	1:50.975	Q
3	Chung Hsiao-ying (TPE)	1:51.941	

==== Heat 2 ====
Rank	Athlete	Time	Notes
1	Liu Qiuhong (CHN)	1:41.626	Q
2	Wang Xinyue (HKG)	1:41.719	Q
3	Xeniya Motova (KAZ)	1:42.317	

==== Heat 3 ====
Rank	Athlete	Time	Notes
1	Park Seung-hi (KOR)	1:47.191	Q
2	Biba Sakurai (JPN)	1:47.247	Q
3	Ri Won-hyang (PRK)	1:48.853	
4	Otgonbayaryn Amarzayaa (MGL)	1:57.657	

==== Heat 4 ====
Rank	Athlete	Time	Notes
1	Zhou Yang (CHN)	1:41.171	Q
2	Inna Simonova (KAZ)	1:41.643	Q
3	Lin Wei (TPE)	1:41.739	

=== Semifinals ===
- Qualification: 1–2 → Final A (QA), 3–4 → Final B (QB)

==== Heat 1 ====
Rank	Athlete	Time	Notes
1	Liu Qiuhong (CHN)	1:34.684	QA
2	Park Seung-hi (KOR)	1:34.785	QA
3	Wang Xinyue (HKG)	1:35.412	QB
4	Biba Sakurai (JPN)	1:55.992	QB

==== Heat 2 ====
Rank	Athlete	Time	Notes
1	Cho Ha-ri (KOR)	1:34.681	QA
2	Zhou Yang (CHN)	1:34.807	QA
3	Yui Sakai (JPN)	1:34.893	QB
4	Inna Simonova (KAZ)	1:43.883	QB

=== Finals ===
==== Final B ====
Rank	Athlete	Time
1	Yui Sakai (JPN)	1:39.819
2	Biba Sakurai (JPN)	1:40.025
3	Wang Xinyue (HKG)	1:40.365
4	Inna Simonova (KAZ)	1:42.687

==== Final A ====
Rank	Athlete	Time
1st place, gold medalist(s)	Park Seung-hi (KOR)	1:33.343
2nd place, silver medalist(s)	Cho Ha-ri (KOR)	1:33.622
3rd place, bronze medalist(s)	Liu Qiuhong (CHN)	1:33.903
4	Zhou Yang (CHN)	1:34.023
