= Short-track speed skating at the 2011 Asian Winter Games – Women's 500 metres =

Women's 500 metres at the 2011 Asian Winter Games
- Venue: Saryarka Velodrome
- Dates: 1 February 2011
- Competitors: 14 from 8 nations

Medalists
| gold medal | Liu Qiuhong | China |
| silver medal | Fan Kexin | China |
| bronze medal | Yui Sakai | Japan |

The women's 500 metres at the 2011 Asian Winter Games was held on February 1, 2011 in Astana, Kazakhstan.

== Schedule ==
All times are Almaty Time (UTC+06:00)

| Date | Time | Event |
|---|---|---|
| Tuesday, 1 February 2011 | 14:00 | Heats |
| Tuesday, 1 February 2011 | 14:16 | Semifinals |
| Tuesday, 1 February 2011 | 14:32 | Finals |

== Results ==
=== Heats ===
- Qualification: 1–2 → Semifinals (Q)

==== Heat 1 ====
| Rank | Athlete | Time | Notes |
|---|---|---|---|
| 1 | Cho Ha-ri (KOR) | 45.645 | Q |
| 2 | Ayuko Ito (JPN) | 45.805 | Q |
| 3 | Kim Jong-mi (PRK) | 46.151 | |
| 4 | Otgonbayaryn Amarzayaa (MGL) | 56.103 | |

==== Heat 2 ====
| Rank | Athlete | Time | Notes |
|---|---|---|---|
| 1 | Fan Kexin (CHN) | 44.752 | Q |
| 2 | Wang Xinyue (HKG) | 45.139 | Q |
| 3 | Darya Volokitina (KAZ) | 45.972 | |

==== Heat 3 ====
| Rank | Athlete | Time | Notes |
|---|---|---|---|
| 1 | Yang Shin-young (KOR) | 45.221 | Q |
| 2 | Yui Sakai (JPN) | 45.405 | Q |
| 3 | Chung Hsiao-ying (TPE) | 46.912 | |
| 4 | Hwang Hye-jong (PRK) | 47.029 | |

==== Heat 4 ====
| Rank | Athlete | Time | Notes |
|---|---|---|---|
| 1 | Liu Qiuhong (CHN) | 44.843 | Q |
| 2 | Inna Simonova (KAZ) | 47.255 | Q |
| 3 | Lin Wei (TPE) | 47.419 | |

=== Semifinals ===
- Qualification: 1–2 → Final A (QA), 3–4 → Final B (QB)

==== Heat 1 ====
| Rank | Athlete | Time | Notes |
|---|---|---|---|
| 1 | Fan Kexin (CHN) | 44.940 | QA |
| 2 | Cho Ha-ri (KOR) | 45.091 | QA |
| 3 | Wang Xinyue (HKG) | 45.138 | QB |
| 4 | Ayuko Ito (JPN) | 45.152 | QB |

==== Heat 2 ====
| Rank | Athlete | Time | Notes |
|---|---|---|---|
| 1 | Liu Qiuhong (CHN) | 44.373 | QA |
| 2 | Yui Sakai (JPN) | 44.457 | QA |
| 3 | Yang Shin-young (KOR) | 44.488 | QB |
| 4 | Inna Simonova (KAZ) | 50.910 | QB |

=== Finals ===
==== Final B ====
| Rank | Athlete | Time |
|---|---|---|
| 1 | Yang Shin-young (KOR) | 45.732 |
| 2 | Wang Xinyue (HKG) | 45.797 |
| 3 | Ayuko Ito (JPN) | 45.891 |
| 4 | Inna Simonova (KAZ) | 48.614 |

==== Final A ====
| Rank | Athlete | Time |
|---|---|---|
| 1st place, gold medalist(s) | Liu Qiuhong (CHN) | 43.964 |
| 2nd place, silver medalist(s) | Fan Kexin (CHN) | 44.070 |
| 3rd place, bronze medalist(s) | Yui Sakai (JPN) | 44.399 |
| 4 | Cho Ha-ri (KOR) | 44.563 |
