= Short-track speed skating at the 2011 Asian Winter Games – Men's 5000 metre relay =

Men's 5000 metre relay at the 2011 Asian Winter Games
- Venue: Saryarka Velodrome
- Dates: 1–2 February 2011
- Competitors: 23 from 5 nations

Medalists
gold medal	South Korea; Lee Ho-suk, Noh Jin-kyu, Sung Si-bak, Kim Byeong-jun, Um Cheon-ho
silver medal	Japan; Yuzo Takamido, Daisuke Uemura, Ryosuke Sakazume, Takahiro Fujimoto
bronze medal	Kazakhstan; Aidar Bekzhanov, Artur Sultangaliyev, Nurbergen Zhumagaziyev, Abzal Azhgaliyev, Fedor Andreyev

The men's 5000 metre relay at the 2011 Asian Winter Games was held on February 1 and 2, 2011 in Astana, Kazakhstan.

== Schedule ==
All times are Almaty Time (UTC+06:00)

Date	Time	Event
Tuesday, 1 February 2011	15:08	Heats
Wednesday, 2 February 2011	15:14	Final

== Results ==
Legend

- PEN — Penalty

=== Heats ===
- Qualification: 1–2 → Final (Q)

==== Heat 1 ====
Rank	Team	Time	Notes
1	South Korea (KOR); Lee Ho-suk; Um Cheon-ho; Noh Jin-kyu; Sung Si-bak	6:52.551	Q
2	Kazakhstan (KAZ); Artur Sultangaliyev; Nurbergen Zhumagaziyev; Fedor Andreyev; Abzal Azhgaliyev	7:08.289	Q
3	Chinese Taipei (TPE); Yang Shun-fan; Tsai Yu-lun; Yang Bo-kai; Wang Yang-chun	7:22.922	

==== Heat 2 ====
Rank	Team	Time	Notes
1	China (CHN); Liang Wenhao; Liu Xianwei; Song Weilong; Yang Jin	6:51.864	Q
2	Japan (JPN); Yuzo Takamido; Daisuke Uemura; Ryosuke Sakazume; Takahiro Fujimoto	6:57.804	Q

=== Final ===
Rank	Team	Time
1st place, gold medalist(s)	South Korea (KOR); Lee Ho-suk; Noh Jin-kyu; Sung Si-bak; Kim Byeong-jun	6:44.705
2nd place, silver medalist(s)	Japan (JPN); Yuzo Takamido; Daisuke Uemura; Ryosuke Sakazume; Takahiro Fujimoto	6:54.268
3rd place, bronze medalist(s)	Kazakhstan (KAZ); Aidar Bekzhanov; Artur Sultangaliyev; Nurbergen Zhumagaziyev; Abzal Azhgaliyev	7:06.225
—	China (CHN); Han Jialiang; Liang Wenhao; Liu Xianwei; Song Weilong	PEN
