= Cross-country skiing at the 2011 Asian Winter Games – Women's 10 kilometre freestyle =

Women's 10 kilometre freestyle at the 2011 Asian Winter Games
- Venue: Biathlon and Cross-Country Ski Complex
- Dates: 2 February 2011
- Competitors: 10 from 5 nations

Medalists
gold medal	Lee Chae-won	South Korea
silver medal	Masako Ishida	Japan
bronze medal	Yuki Kobayashi	Japan

The women's 10 kilometre freestyle at the 2011 Asian Winter Games was held on February 2, 2011 at Biathlon and Cross-Country Ski Complex, Almaty.

== Schedule ==
All times are Almaty Time (UTC+06:00)

Date	Time	Event
Wednesday, 2 February 2011	13:05	Final

== Results ==
Rank	Athlete	Time
1st place, gold medalist(s)	Lee Chae-won (KOR)	36:34.6
2nd place, silver medalist(s)	Masako Ishida (JPN)	37:15.8
3rd place, bronze medalist(s)	Yuki Kobayashi (JPN)	37:15.9
4	Li Hongxue (CHN)	37:31.0
5	Yelena Kolomina (KAZ)	38:16.2
6	Svetlana Malahova-Shishkina (KAZ)	38:30.5
7	Li Xin (CHN)	41:04.8
8	Lee Eun-kyung (KOR)	45:47.0
9	Bhuwneshwari Thakur (IND)	56:05.6
10	Phuntsog Yangdon (IND)	1:06:01.1
