= Short-track speed skating at the 2011 Asian Winter Games – Women's 1500 metres =

Women's 1500 metres at the 2011 Asian Winter Games
- Venue: Saryarka Velodrome
- Dates: 31 January 2011
- Competitors: 13 from 7 nations

Medalists
gold medal	Cho Ha-ri	South Korea
silver medal	Park Seung-hi	South Korea
bronze medal	Biba Sakurai	Japan

The women's 1500 metres at the 2011 Asian Winter Games was held on January 31, 2011, in Astana, Kazakhstan.

== Schedule ==
All times are Almaty Time (UTC+06:00)

Date	Time	Event
Monday, 31 January 2011	14:00	Heats
Monday, 31 January 2011	14:25	Finals

== Results ==
Legend

- DNS — Did not start
- PEN — Penalty

=== Heats ===
- Qualification: 1–2 → Final A (QA), 3–4 → Final B (QB)

==== Heat 1 ====
Rank	Athlete	Time	Notes
1	Cho Ha-ri (KOR)	2:59.655	QA
2	Fan Kexin (CHN)	2:59.773	QA
3	Wang Xinyue (HKG)	3:00.233	QB
4	Chung Hsiao-ying (TPE)	3:00.281	QB

==== Heat 2 ====
Rank	Athlete	Time	Notes
1	Zhou Yang (CHN)	2:38.313	QA
2	Yasuko Sakashita (JPN)	2:39.742	QA
3	Darya Volokitina (KAZ)	2:39.840	QB
4	Ju Yun-mi (PRK)	2:41.122	QB
5	Tsou Mu-yin (TPE)	2:50.528	

==== Heat 3 ====
Rank	Athlete	Time	Notes
1	Park Seung-hi (KOR)	3:14.934	QA
2	Biba Sakurai (JPN)	3:15.048	QA
3	Xeniya Motova (KAZ)	3:15.725	QB
4	Kim Mi-hyang (PRK)	3:15.862	QB

=== Finals ===
==== Final B ====
Rank	Athlete	Time
1	Darya Volokitina (KAZ)	3:00.443
2	Ju Yun-mi (PRK)	3:00.522
3	Kim Mi-hyang (PRK)	3:00.662
4	Xeniya Motova (KAZ)	3:00.723
—	Wang Xinyue (HKG)	PEN
—	Chung Hsiao-ying (TPE)	DNS

==== Final A ====
Rank	Athlete	Time
1st place, gold medalist(s)	Cho Ha-ri (KOR)	2:38.442
2nd place, silver medalist(s)	Park Seung-hi (KOR)	2:38.621
3rd place, bronze medalist(s)	Biba Sakurai (JPN)	2:38.724
4	Zhou Yang (CHN)	2:38.895
5	Fan Kexin (CHN)	2:39.952
6	Yasuko Sakashita (JPN)	2:40.472
