= Cross-country skiing at the 2011 Asian Winter Games – Women's sprint classical =

Women's sprint classical at the 2011 Asian Winter Games
- Venue: Biathlon and Cross-Country Ski Complex
- Dates: 31 January 2011
- Competitors: 8 from 4 nations

Medalists
gold medal	Madoka Natsumi	Japan
silver medal	Yelena Kolomina	Kazakhstan
bronze medal	Oxana Yatskaya	Kazakhstan

The women's sprint classical at the 2011 Asian Winter Games was held on January 31, 2011 at Biathlon and Cross-Country Ski Complex, Almaty.

== Schedule ==
All times are Almaty Time (UTC+06:00)

Date	Time	Event
Monday, 31 January 2011	10:05	Qualification
Monday, 31 January 2011	11:00	Semifinals
Monday, 31 January 2011	11:33	Final

== Results ==
Legend

- DNS — Did not start

=== Qualification ===
Rank	Athlete	Time
1	Madoka Natsumi (JPN)	3:46.63
2	Oxana Yatskaya (KAZ)	3:48.83
3	Yelena Kolomina (KAZ)	3:52.31
4	Man Dandan (CHN)	3:53.80
5	Naoko Omori (JPN)	4:00.28
6	Song Bo (CHN)	4:04.38
7	Lee Chae-won (KOR)	4:12.28
8	Han Da-som (KOR)	4:36.74

=== Semifinals ===
==== Heat 1 ====
Rank	Athlete	Time
1	Madoka Natsumi (JPN)	3:42.0
2	Man Dandan (CHN)	3:42.7
3	Naoko Omori (JPN)	3:46.6
—	Han Da-som (KOR)	DNS

==== Heat 2 ====
Rank	Athlete	Time
1	Oxana Yatskaya (KAZ)	3:52.0
2	Yelena Kolomina (KAZ)	3:53.0
3	Song Bo (CHN)	3:57.2
—	Lee Chae-won (KOR)	DNS

=== Final ===
Rank	Athlete	Time
1st place, gold medalist(s)	Madoka Natsumi (JPN)	3:35.2
2nd place, silver medalist(s)	Yelena Kolomina (KAZ)	3:39.2
3rd place, bronze medalist(s)	Oxana Yatskaya (KAZ)	3:41.1
4	Man Dandan (CHN)	3:41.2
