= Biathlon at the 2011 Asian Winter Games – Women's individual =

Women's 15 kilometre individual at the 2011 Asian Winter Games
- Venue: Biathlon and Cross-Country Ski Complex
- Dates: 4 February 2011
- Competitors: 8 from 4 nations

Medalists
gold medal	Yelena Khrustaleva	Kazakhstan
silver medal	Fuyuko Suzuki	Japan
bronze medal	Marina Lebedeva	Kazakhstan

The women's 15 kilometre individual at the 2011 Asian Winter Games was held on February 4, 2011 at Biathlon and Cross-Country Ski Complex, Almaty.

== Schedule ==
All times are Almaty Time (UTC+06:00)

Date	Time	Event
Friday, 4 February 2011	11:00	Final

== Results ==
Rank	Athlete	Ski time	Penalties					Time
Rank	Athlete	Ski time	P	S	P	S	Total	Time
1st place, gold medalist(s)	Yelena Khrustaleva (KAZ)	51:16.8	1	1	0	0	2	53:16.8
2nd place, silver medalist(s)	Fuyuko Suzuki (JPN)	51:31.7	1	1	0	1	3	54:31.7
3rd place, bronze medalist(s)	Marina Lebedeva (KAZ)	51:36.3	0	2	0	1	3	54:36.3
4	Mun Ji-hee (KOR)	52:42.1	2	0	1	1	4	56:42.1
5	Wang Chunli (CHN)	51:34.4	0	2	3	2	7	58:34.4
6	Liu Yuanyuan (CHN)	51:35.8	2	3	2	0	7	58:35.8
7	Chu Kyung-mi (KOR)	56:34.5	0	1	0	3	4	1:00:34.5
8	Natsuko Abe (JPN)	54:34.6	3	1	3	5	12	1:06:34.6
