= Cross-country skiing at the 2011 Asian Winter Games – Women's 5 kilometre classical =

Women's 5 kilometre classical at the 2011 Asian Winter Games
- Venue: Biathlon and Cross-Country Ski Complex
- Dates: 3 February 2011
- Competitors: 8 from 4 nations

Medalists
| gold medal | Masako Ishida | Japan |
| silver medal | Madoka Natsumi | Japan |
| bronze medal | Li Hongxue | China |

The women's 5 kilometre classical at the 2011 Asian Winter Games was held on February 3, 2011 at Biathlon and Cross-Country Ski Complex, Almaty.

== Schedule ==
All times are Almaty Time (UTC+06:00)

| Date | Time | Event |
|---|---|---|
| Thursday, 3 February 2011 | 10:05 | Final |

== Results ==
| Rank | Athlete | Time |
|---|---|---|
| 1st place, gold medalist(s) | Masako Ishida (JPN) | 16:10.3 |
| 2nd place, silver medalist(s) | Madoka Natsumi (JPN) | 16:48.6 |
| 3rd place, bronze medalist(s) | Li Hongxue (CHN) | 17:12.1 |
| 4 | Yelena Kolomina (KAZ) | 17:17.0 |
| 5 | Svetlana Malahova-Shishkina (KAZ) | 17:24.1 |
| 6 | Man Dandan (CHN) | 18:00.3 |
| 7 | Nam Seul-gi (KOR) | 19:17.6 |
| 8 | Han Da-som (KOR) | 21:01.0 |
