= Biathlon at the 2011 Asian Winter Games – Women's sprint =

Women's 7.5 kilometre sprint at the 2011 Asian Winter Games
- Venue: Biathlon and Cross-Country Ski Complex
- Dates: 31 January 2011
- Competitors: 8 from 4 nations

Medalists
gold medal	Wang Chunli	China
silver medal	Yelena Khrustaleva	Kazakhstan
bronze medal	Marina Lebedeva	Kazakhstan

The women's 7.5 kilometre sprint at the 2011 Asian Winter Games was held on January 31, 2011, at Biathlon and Cross-Country Ski Complex, Almaty.

== Schedule ==
All times are Almaty Time (UTC+06:00)

Date	Time	Event
Monday, 31 January 2011	13:30	Final

== Results ==
Rank	Athlete	Penalties			Time
Rank	Athlete	P	S	Total	Time
1st place, gold medalist(s)	Wang Chunli (CHN)	0	0	0	23:12.1
2nd place, silver medalist(s)	Yelena Khrustaleva (KAZ)	0	0	0	23:21.6
3rd place, bronze medalist(s)	Marina Lebedeva (KAZ)	0	1	1	24:06.9
4	Fuyuko Suzuki (JPN)	0	0	0	24:26.2
5	Mun Ji-hee (KOR)	3	1	4	25:52.1
6	Itsuka Owada (JPN)	0	1	1	26:12.0
7	Tang Jialin (CHN)	2	3	5	26:30.5
8	Chu Kyung-mi (KOR)	2	3	5	28:12.2
