= Speed skating at the 2011 Asian Winter Games – Women's mass start =

Women's mass start at the 2011 Asian Winter Games
- Venue: Alau Ice Palace
- Dates: 2 February 2011
- Competitors: 12 from 5 nations

Medalists
gold medal	Noh Seon-yeong	South Korea
silver medal	Masako Hozumi	Japan
bronze medal	Lee Ju-yeon	South Korea

The women's Mass start event was held on February 2. 12 athletes participated. The final was held at 15:05.

== Schedule ==
All times are Almaty Time (UTC+06:00)

Date	Time	Event
Wednesday, 2 February 2011	15:05	Final

== Results ==
Legend

- DNF — Did not finish

Rank	Athlete	Time
1st place, gold medalist(s)	Noh Seon-yeong (KOR)	18:07.05
2nd place, silver medalist(s)	Masako Hozumi (JPN)	18:07.35
3rd place, bronze medalist(s)	Lee Ju-yeon (KOR)	18:07.37
4	Park Do-yeong (KOR)	18:07.39
5	Shiho Ishizawa (JPN)	18:07.99
6	Fu Chunyan (CHN)	18:08.09
7	Chang Chao (CHN)	18:08.12
8	Olga Zhigina (KAZ)	18:11.35
9	Yelena Urvantseva (KAZ)	18:12.15
10	Hwang Sung-hui (PRK)	18:12.45
11	Tatyana Sokirko (KAZ)	18:14.52
—	Eriko Ishino (JPN)	DNF
