= South Korea at the 2011 Asian Winter Games =

- IOC code: KOR
- NOC: Korean Olympic Committee

in Astana and Almaty
- Competitors: 108 in 10 sports
- Flag bearer: Park Woo-Sang
- Officials: 44
- Medals Ranked 3rd: Gold 13 Silver 12 Bronze 13 Total 38

Asian Winter Games appearances (overview)
- 1986; 1990; 1996; 1999; 2003; 2007; 2011; 2017; 2025; 2029

South Korea participated in the 2011 Asian Winter Games held in Almaty and Astana, Kazakhstan, from 30 January to 6 February 2011.

== Medal summary ==
=== Medal table ===
Sport	Gold	Silver	Bronze	Total
Speed skating	5	6	3	14
Short track speed skating	4	4	1	9
Alpine skiing	3	1	3	7
Cross-country skiing	1	0	2	3
Ski orienteering	0	1	1	2
Figure skating	0	0	1	1
Ice hockey	0	0	1	1
Ski jumping	0	0	1	1
Totals (8 entries)	13	12	13	38

=== Medalists ===
==== Gold ====
Alpine skiing

- Men's combined – Jung Dong-hyun
- Women's downhill – Kim Sun-joo
- Women's super-G – Kim Sun-joo

Cross-country skiing

- Women's 10 km – Lee Chae-won

Short track speed skating

- Men's 1500 m – Noh Jin-kyu
- Women's 1000 m – Park Seung-hi
- Women's 1500 m – Cho Ha-ri
- Men's 5000 m relay – Lee Ho-suk, Noh Jin-kyu, Sung Si-bak, Kim Byeong-jun, Um Cheon-ho

Speed skating

- Men's 5000 m – Lee Seung-hoon
- Men's 10000 m – Lee Seung-hoon
- Men's mass start – Lee Seung-hoon
- Women's mass start – Noh Seon-yeong
- Women's team pursuit – Lee Ju-yeon, Noh Seon-yeong, Park Do-young

==== Silver ====
Alpine skiing

- Women's combined – Jeong So-ra

Short track speed skating

- Men's 1500 m – Um Cheon-ho
- Women's 1000 m – Cho Ha-ri
- Women's 1500 m – Park Seung-hi
- Women's 3000 m relay – Park Seung-hi, Cho Ha-ri, Yang Shin-young, Hwang Hyun-sun

Ski orienteering

- Women's relay – Kim Ja-Youn, Lee Ha-na, Choi Seul-bi

Speed skating

- Men's 500 m – Lee Kang-seok
- Men's 1500 m – Mo Tae-bum
- Men's team pursuit – Lee Kyou-hyuk, Mo Tae-bum, Lee Seung-hoon
- Women's 1500 m – Noh Seon-yeong
- Women's 3000 m – Kim Bo-reum
- Women's 5000 m – Park Do-young

==== Bronze ====
Alpine skiing

- Men's downhill – Jung Dong-hyun
- Men's combined – Kim Woo-sung
- Women's super-G – Jung Hye-mi

Cross-country skiing

- Men's 4 x 10 km relay – Lee Jun-gil, Im Eui-gyu, Ha Tae-bok, Park Byung-joo
- Men's team sprint – Park Byung-joo, Jung Eui-myung

Figure skating

- Ladies' singles – Kwak Min-jeong

Ice hockey

- Men's top division – Eum Hyun-Seung, Park Sung-Je, Kim Woo-jae, Kim Yoon-hwan, Kim Woo-young, Lee Don-ku, Kim Dong-hwan, Kim Hyun-soo, Kim Sang-wook, Kim Hyeok, Song Dong-hwan, Kim Kyu-hun, Kim Geun-ho, Kim Won-jung, Kim Ki-sung, Park Woo-sang, Kwon Tae-an, Cho Min-ho, Sin Sang-woo, Choi Jung-sik, Lee Yong-jun, Suh Sin-il, Ahn Hyun-min

Short track speed skating

- Men's 1000 m – Sung Si-bak

Ski jumping

- Large hill team – Choi Heung-chul, Kang Chil-ku, Choi Yong-jik, Kim Hyun-ki

Ski orienteering

- Women's long distance – Kim Ja-youn

Speed skating

- Men's 1500 m – Lee Kyou-hyuk
- Women's 500 m – Lee Sang-hwa
- Women's mass start – Lee Ju-youn

== Alpine skiing ==
South Korea sent 5 athletes to compete in the alpine skiing event.

Men

Athlete	Event	Final	
Athlete	Event	Time	Rank
Jung Dong-hyun	Downhill	1:29.78	3rd place, bronze medalist(s)
Jung Dong-hyun	Super-G	Did not finish	
Jung Dong-hyun	Super Combined	1:45.70	1st place, gold medalist(s)
Kim Woo-sung	Downhill	1:31.67	6
Kim Woo-sung	Super-G	Disqualify	
Kim Woo-sung	Super Combined	1:47.74	3rd place, bronze medalist(s)

Women

Athlete	Event	Final	
Athlete	Event	Time	Rank
Kim Sun-joo	Downhill	1:37.61	1st place, gold medalist(s)
Kim Sun-joo	Super-G	1:10.83	1st place, gold medalist(s)
Kim Sun-joo	Super Combined	Disqualify	
Jung Hey-me	Downhill	1:40.34	4
Jung Hey-me	Super-G	1:12.31	3rd place, bronze medalist(s)
Jeong So-ra	Super Combined	2:03.64	2nd place, silver medalist(s)

== Biathlon ==
South Korea sent 10 athletes to compete in the biathlon event.

Men

Athlete	Event	Final	
Athlete	Event	Time	Rank
Lee In-bok	Individual	1:05:53.6	5
Lee In-bok	Sprint	31:35.9	7
Lee In-bok	Pursuit	Did not start	
Jun Je-uk	Individual	1:05:19.7	4
Lee Su-young	Sprint	32:33.5	8
Lee Su-young	Pursuit	44:00.7	7
Jun Je-uk; Lee In-Bok; Lee Su-Young; Lee Jung-Sik	Relay	1:31:13.0	4

Women

Athlete	Event	Final	
Athlete	Event	Time	Rank
Chu Kyoung-mi	Individual	1:00:34.5	7
Chu Kyoung-mi	Sprint	28:12.2	8
Mun Ji-hee	Individual	56:42.1	4
Mun Ji-hee	Sprint	25:52.1	5
Chu Kyoung-mi; Mun Ji-hee; Kim Seo-ra; Kim Kyung-nam	Relay	1:35:19.5	4

== Cross-country skiing ==
South Korea sent 9 athletes to compete in cross -country skiing event.

Men

Athlete	Event	Qualification		Semifinal		Final	
Athlete	Event	Time	Rank	Time	Rank	Time	Rank
Lee Jun-gil	15 kilometre					Did not finish	
Lee Jun-gil	Sprint	4:33.61	6 Q	4:41.90	4	Did not qualify	
Im Eui-gyu	10 kilometre					35:29.9	6
Im Eui-gyu	Sprint	4:33.35	5 Q	4:34.20	3	Did not qualify	
Ha Tae-bok	10 kilometre					33:26.2	5
Jung Eui-myung	15 kilometre					Disqualify	
Im Eui-gyu; Ha Tae-bok; Lee Jun-gil; Park Byung-joo	4 x 10 kilometre					2:08:07.4	3rd place, bronze medalist(s)
Park Byung-joo; Jung Eui-myung	Team sprint					24:34.9	3rd place, bronze medalist(s)

Women

Athlete	Event	Qualification		Semifinal		Final	
Athlete	Event	Time	Rank	Time	Rank	Time	Rank
Lee Chae-won	10 kilometre					36:34.6	1st place, gold medalist(s)
Lee Chae-won	Sprint	4:12.28	7 Q	DNS		Did not qualify	
Han Da-som	5 kilometre					21:01.0	8
Han Da-som	Sprint	4:36.74	8 Q	DNS		Did not qualify	
Lee Eun-kyung	10 kilometre					45:47.0	8
Nam Seul-gi	5 kilometre					19:17.6	7
Nam Seul-gi; Lee Chae-won; Han Da-som; Lee Eun-kyung	4 x 5 kilometre					1:11:51.2	4
Lee Eun-kyung; Nam Seul-gi	Team sprint					23:38.6	4

== Figure skating ==
South Korea sent 3 athletes to compete in the figure skating event.

Men

Athlete(s)	Event	SP/OD		FS/FD		Total	
Athlete(s)	Event	Points	Rank	Points	Rank	Points	Rank
Kim Min-seok	Men's	58.09	5	106.33	9	164.42	9

Women

Athlete(s)	Event	SP/OD		FS/FD		Total	
Athlete(s)	Event	Points	Rank	Points	Rank	Points	Rank
Kwak Min-jeong	Ladies'	52.65	3	95.30	3	147.95	3rd place, bronze medalist(s)
Kim Chae-hwa	Ladies'	45.74	6	81.74	6	127.48	6

== Freestyle skiing ==
Men

Athlete	Event	Qualification		Final	
Athlete	Event	Score	Rank	Score	Rank
Choi Jae-woo	Moguls	18.99	5 Q	18.19	4
Seo Myung-joon	Moguls	14.57	6 Q	16.88	5

Athlete	Event	Qualification		Quarterfinal	Semifinal	Final	
Athlete	Event	Score	Rank	Opposition Score	Opposition Score	Opposition Score	Rank
Choi Jae-woo	Dual Moguls	19.81	4 Q	Reiherd (KAZ); W 18–17	Barmashov (KAZ); L 17–18	Tsukita (JPN); L 17–18	4
Cho Woo-hyun	Dual Moguls	16.56	6 Q	Tsukita (JPN); L 0–35	Did not qualify		

Women

Athlete	Event	Qualification		Final	
Athlete	Event	Score	Rank	Score	Rank
Seo Jung-hwa	Moguls	14.51	4 Q	16.27	6

Athlete	Event	Qualification		Quarterfinal	Semifinal	Final	
Athlete	Event	Score	Rank	Opposition Score	Opposition Score	Opposition Score	Rank
Seo Jung-hwa	Dual Moguls	18.17	5 Q	Satoya (JPN); L 12–23	Did not qualify		

== Ice hockey ==
South Korea will send both a men's and women's team. The men's team will compete in the top division.

=== Men's competition ===
==== Top division ====
Group A

Team	GP	W	OTW	OTL	L	GF	GA	DIF	PTS
Kazakhstan	4	4	0	0	0	62	3	+59	12
Japan	4	3	0	0	1	32	6	+26	9
South Korea	4	2	0	0	2	35	16	+19	6
China	4	1	0	0	3	13	33	−20	3
Chinese Taipei	4	0	0	0	4	1	85	−84	0

All times are local (UTC+6).

January 31, 2011; 14:30	Chinese Taipei	0–22 (0–6, 0–10, 0–6)	South Korea	Kazakhstan Sports Palace (Arena 1); Attendance: 450

Game reference

Ting Pang-Keng
Lin Tsung-Han
Goalies
Eum Hyun-Seung
Park Sung-Je
Referees:
(Slovakia) Juraj Konc
(Canada) Derek Zalaski

0–1	01:19 – Kim W.J. (Kim G.H., Cho M.H.)
0–2	03:34 – Kim K.H. (Cho M.H., Ahn H.M.)
0–3	11:31 – Song D.H. (Kwon T.A., Kim S.W.)
0–4	15:43 – Lee Y.J. (Park W.S., Kim W.J.)
0–5	18:30 – Choi J.S. (Suh S.I., Sin S.W.)
0–6	19:29 – Cho M.H. (Kim D.H.)
0–7	22:43 – Cho M.H. (Kim G.H., Kim W.J.)
0–8	22:55 – Kim Y.H. (Kim W.J.)
0–9	23:56– Song D.H. (Kim S.W., Kwon T.A.)
0–10	30:27 – Kim G.H. (Choi J.S., Sin S.W.)
0–11	33:40 – Suh S.I. (Sin S.W.)
0–12	34:49 – Kim K.S. (Kim D.H.)
0–13	35:22 – Kim K.S. (Lee Y.J., Park W.S.)
0–14	36:58 – Kim W.J. (Ahn H.M., Kim Y.H.)
0–15	37:39 – Kim H.O. (Ahn H.M., Kim Y.H.)
0–16	38:30 – Park W.S. (Kim W.J., Lee Y.J.)
0–17	44:11 – Suh S.I. (Sin S.W., Kim Y.H.)
0–18	46:43 – Park W.S. (Kim K.H., Kim W.J.)
0–19	49:36 – Cho M.H. (PP)
0–20	49:52 – Sin S.W. (Choi J.S.)
0–21	56:02 – Kim K.S. (Kim H.S.) (SH)
0–22	57:55 – Kim K.H. (Park W.S.)

4 min
Penalties
4 min
7
Shots
81

February 3, 2011; 14:30	Japan	6–1 (0–1, 5–0, 1–0)	South Korea	Kazakhstan Sports Palace (Arena 1); Attendance: 2,700

Game reference

Yutaka Fukufuji
Goalies
Eum Hyun-seung
Park Sung-je
Referees:
(Slovakia) Juraj Konc
(Czech Republic) Roman Polak

	0–1	12:09 – Cho M.H. (Kim D.H.) (PP)
M. Domeki (A. Keller, S. Kuji) (PP2) – 21:50	1–1
T. Suzuki (G. Tanaka, H. Osawa) (PP2) – 25:20	2–1
G. Tanaka (T. Suzuki) (SH1) – 32:11	3–1
H. Osawa (G. Tanaka, T. Suzuki) (PP) – 35:17	4–1
T. Yamashita (A. Keller, M. Domeki) (PP) – 36:01	5–1
H. Ueno (M. Nishiwaki, T. Suzuki) – 52:10	6–1

14 min
Penalties
28 min
40
Shots
27

February 4, 2011; 19:00	South Korea	1–9 (0–3, 1–3, 0–3)	Kazakhstan	Kazakhstan Sports Palace (Arena 1)

Game reference

February 6, 2011; 10:00	South Korea	11–1 (6–0, 3–1, 2–0)	China	Kazakhstan Sports Palace (Arena 1)

Game reference

==== Men's roster ====
- Team roster

- Eum Hyun-seung
- Park Sung-je
- Kim Woo-jae
- Kim Yoon-hwan
- Kim Woo-young
- Lee Don-ku
- Kim Dong-hwan
- Kim Hyun-soo
- Kim Sang-wook
- Kim Hyeok
- Song Dong-hwan
- Kim Kyu-hun
- Kim Geun-ho
- Kim Won-jung
- Kim Ki-sung
- Park Woo-sang
- Kwon Tae-an
- Cho Min-ho
- Sin Sang-woo
- Choi Jung-sik
- Lee Yong-jun
- Suh Sin-il
- Ahn Hyun-min

=== Women's competition ===
Group A

Team	GP	W	OTW	OTL	L	GF	GA	DIF	PTS
Kazakhstan	4	3	1	0	0	21	3	+18	11
Japan	4	2	1	1	0	22	6	+16	9
China	4	2	0	1	1	22	9	+13	7
North Korea	4	1	0	0	3	7	18	−11	3
South Korea	4	0	0	0	4	1	37	−36	0

All times are local (UTC+6).

January 28, 2011; 14:30	South Korea	0–10 (0–4, 0–3, 0–3)	Japan	Baluan Sholak Palace of Culture and Sports; Attendance: 1,500

Game reference

Shin So-jung
Goalies
Shizuka Takahashi
Referee:
(Russia) Arina Ustinova

0–1	A. Nakamura (Y. Adachi) – 01:32
0–2	S. Shimozawa (Y. Hirano, K. Aoki) – 16:17 (PP)
0–3	T. Eguchi (H. Yoneyama) – 18:14
0–4	Y. Hirano (T. Sakagami) – 18:46
0–5	M. Fujimoto (H. Yoneyama) – 29:21
0–6	H. Yoneyama (S. Koike, M. Shishiuchi) – 37:15
0–7	T. Sakagami (Y. Hirano, S. Shimozawa) – 39:59
0–8	M. Shishiuchi (M. Fujimoto, H. Yoneyama) – 40:40
0–9	K. Aoki (Y. Hirano) – 43:40 (PP)
0–10	M. Fujimoto (T. Yamane) – 53:59 (PP)

18 min
Penalties
4 min
4
Shots
86

January 29, 2011; 19:00	Kazakhstan	11–0 (2–0, 5–0, 4–0)	South Korea	Baluan Sholak Palace of Culture and Sports; Attendance: 2,400

Game reference

Darya Obydennova
Aizhan Raushanova
Goalies
Shin So-jung
Referee:
(Japan) Kotoe Umemura

N. Yakovchuk (A. Fux) – 03:54	1–0
A. Fux (Y. Shtelmaister, N. Yakovchuk) – 12:11	2–0
A. Fux (N. Yakovchuk, G. Shu) – 22:39	3–0
Z. Tukhtiyeva (Y. Shtelmaister, L. Sviridova) – 30:15	4–0
Z. Tukhtiyeva (L. Sviridova) – 34:53	5–0
N. Yakovchuk (Y. Shtelmaister) – 36:30	6–0
Z. Tukhtiyeva (O. Potapova, G. Shu) – 37:21	7–0
Z. Tukhtiyeva (O. Potapova, Y. Shtelmaister) (PP) – 45:09	8–0
Y. Shtelmaister (V. Mussatayeva) (PP) – 52:23	9–0
Y. Shtelmaister (N. Yakovchuk, A. Fux) – 54:43	10–0
N. Yakovchuk (L. Ibragimova) – 56:19	11–0

8 min
Penalties
8 min
101
Shots
4

January 31, 2011; 14:30	China	10–0 (1–0, 5–0, 4–0)	South Korea	Baluan Sholak Palace of Culture and Sports; Attendance: 700

Game reference

Shi Yao
Goalies
Shin So-jung
Referee:
(Russia) Arina Ustinova

Sun R. (Jin F., Zhang B.) – 16:36	1–0
Sun R. (Huo C.) – 20:55	2–0
Sun R. (Qi X.) – 23:05	3–0
Qi X. (Sun R.) – 23:29	4–0
Sun R. (Jin F.) – 29:42	5–0
Tang L. – 35:22	6–0
Sun R. (Jin F.) – 46:21	7–0
Zhang B. (Jin F.) (PP) – 51:44	8–0
Tang L. (Fang X., Liu Z.) (PP) – 54:38	9–0
Qi X. (Sun R.) (SH) – 58:29	10–0

6 min
Penalties
8 min
78
Shots
2

February 1, 2011; 14:30	North Korea	6–1 (2–1, 2–0, 2–0)	South Korea	Baluan Sholak Palace of Culture and Sports; Attendance: 551

Game reference

Hong Kum Sil
Goalies
Shin So-jung
Referee:
(Japan) Kotoe Umemura

O C.O. (Kim S.H., Kim N.G.) – 08:24	1–0
	1–1	09:57 – Lee K.S. (Hwango Y.) (PP)
Ri Y.S. (Ri S.G.) (PP) – 08:24	2–1
Won C.S. (Kim S.H.) – 27:28	3–1
O C.O. (Ri Y.S.) – 37:10	4–1
Ro S.B. (Kim K.B., Ri S.G.) – 48:11	5–1
Ryu H.M. (Ri S.G.) – 52:17	6–1

6 min
Penalties
2 min
70
Shots
14

==== Women's roster ====
- Team roster

- Lee Young-hwa
- Hwangbo Young
- Kim Eun-Jin
- Choi Bo-Young
- Jo Kyoo-young
- Lee Kyou-sun
- Ko Chea-ryung
- Han Soo-jin
- Han Jae-yeon
- Park Da-yun
- Hong Yong-joo
- Shin So-jung
- Yong Hwa-yeon
- Ahn Kun-young
- Lee Min-ji
- Lee Yeon-jeong
- Han Do-hee
- Ko Hye-in

== Short track speed skating ==
South Korea sent 10 athletes to compete in the short track speed skating event.

Men

Athlete	Event	Heats		Semifinal		Final	
Athlete	Event	Time	Rank	Time	Rank	Time	Rank
Kim Byeong-jun	500 m	1:14.302	4	Did not qualify			
Lee Ho-suk	500 m	42.325	1 Q	42.366	1 QA	Penalty	
Sung Si-bak	1000 m	1:38.890	1 Q	1:27.368 AR	1 QA	2:41.236	3rd place, bronze medalist(s)
Um Cheon-ho	1000 m	1:27.870	3	Did not qualify			
Um Cheon-ho	1500 m	2:20.258	3 QA			2:19.337	2nd place, silver medalist(s)
Noh Jin-kyu	1500 m	2:32.196	2 QA			2:18.998	1st place, gold medalist(s)
Kim Byeong-jun; Lee Ho-suk; Noh Jin-kyu; Sung Si-bak; Um Cheon-ho	5000 m relay	6:52.551	1 Q			6:44.705 AR	1st place, gold medalist(s)

Women

Athlete	Event	Heats		Semifinal		Final	
Athlete	Event	Time	Rank	Time	Rank	Time	Rank
Yang Shin-young	500 m	45.221	1 Q	44.488	3 QB	45.732	5
Cho Ha-ri	500 m	45.645	1 Q	45.091	2 QA	44.563	4
Cho Ha-ri	1000 m	1:50.875	1 Q	1:34.681	1 QA	1:33.622	2nd place, silver medalist(s)
Cho Ha-ri	1500 m	2:59.655	1 QA			2:38.442	1st place, gold medalist(s)
Park Seung-hi	1000 m	1:47.191	1 Q	1:34.785	2 QA	1:33.343	1st place, gold medalist(s)
Park Seung-hi	1500 m	3:14.934	1 QA			2:38.621	2nd place, silver medalist(s)
Cho Ha-ri; Hwang Hyun-sun; Kim Dam-min; Park Seung-hi; Yang Shin-young	3000 m relay	4:17.256	1 Q			4:30.010	2nd place, silver medalist(s)

== Ski jumping ==
South Korea sent 4 athletes to compete in the ski jumping event.

Men

Athlete	Event	Final	
Athlete	Event	Score	Rank
Choi Heung-chul	Normal hill individual	232.5	7
Choi Heung-chul	Large hill individual	197.4	7
Kim Hyun-ki	Large hill individual	212.4	4
Choi Yong-jik	Normal hill individual	235.0	5
Choi Heung-chul; Kim Hyun-ki; Choi Yong-jik; Kang Chil-ku	Normal hill team	770.3	3rd place, bronze medalist(s)

== Ski orienteering ==
South Korea sent 5 athletes to compete in the ski orienteering event.

Men

Athlete	Event	Final	
Athlete	Event	Time	Rank
Jang Kwang-min	Sprint	26:36.9	6
Jang Kwang-min	Middle distance	1:05:57	8
Jang Kwang-min	Long distance	1:48:11	6
Hong Byung-sik	Sprint	27:50.4	8
Hong Byung-sik	Middle distance	1:11:12	9
Hong Byung-sik	Long distance	Did not finish	
Son Youn-sun; Jang Kwang-min; Hong Byung-sik	Relay	1:34:59	5

Women

Athlete	Event	Final	
Athlete	Event	Time	Rank
Kim Ja-youn	Sprint	26:46.8	4
Kim Ja-youn	Middle distance	49:24	4
Kim Ja-youn	Long distance	1:12:56	3rd place, bronze medalist(s)
Lee Ha-na	Sprint	27:50.4	8
Lee Ha-na	Long distance	1:33:26	5
Choi Seul-bi	Middle distance	56:57	5
Kim Ja-youn; Lee Ha-na; Choi Seul-bi	Relay	1:18:00	2nd place, silver medalist(s)

== Speed skating ==
South Korea sent 13 athletes to compete in the speed skating event.

Men

Athlete	Event	Final	
Athlete	Event	Time	Rank
Lee Kang-seok	500 m	70.35	2nd place, silver medalist(s)
Mo Tae-bum	500 m	70.97	5
Mo Tae-bum	1500 m	1:47.71	2nd place, silver medalist(s)
Lee Kyou-hyuk	1500 m	1:48.66	3rd place, bronze medalist(s)
Lee Seung-hoon	5000 m	6:25.56 AR	1st place, gold medalist(s)
Lee Seung-hoon	10000 m	13:09.74 AR	1st place, gold medalist(s)
Lee Seung-hoon	Mass start	20:18.09	1st place, gold medalist(s)
Ko Byung-wook	5000 m	6:36.71	5
Ko Byung-wook	10000 m	13:39.42	4
Ko Tae-hoon	Mass start	20:47.67	11
Park Seok-min	Mass start	20:29.39	8
Lee Kyou-hyuk; Mo Tae-bum; Lee Seung-hoon	Team pursuit	3:49.21	2nd place, silver medalist(s)

Women

Athlete	Event	Final	
Athlete	Event	Time	Rank
Lee Sang-hwa	500 m	76.58	3rd place, bronze medalist(s)
Lee Bo-ra	500 m	78.35	7
No Seon-yeong	1500 m	1:59.27	2nd place, silver medalist(s)
No Seon-yeong	Mass start	18:07.05	1st place, gold medalist(s)
Lee Ju-youn	1500 m	2:02.01	7
Lee Ju-youn	Mass start	18:07.37	3rd place, bronze medalist(s)
Park Do-young	3000 m	4:21.30	5
Park Do-young	5000 m	7:15.63	2nd place, silver medalist(s)
Park Do-young	Mass start	18:07.39	4
Kim Bo-reum	3000 m	4:10.54	2nd place, silver medalist(s)
Kim Bo-reum	5000 m	7:22.92	4
Lee Ju-youn; No Seon-yeong; Park Do-young	Team pursuit	3:04.35 AR	1st place, gold medalist(s)
