= Cross-country skiing at the 2011 Asian Winter Games – Men's sprint classical =

Men's sprint classical at the 2011 Asian Winter Games
- Venue: Biathlon and Cross-Country Ski Complex
- Dates: 31 January 2011
- Competitors: 8 from 4 nations

Medalists
gold medal	Alexey Poltoranin	Kazakhstan
silver medal	Nikolay Chebotko	Kazakhstan
bronze medal	Yuichi Onda	Japan

The men's sprint classical at the 2011 Asian Winter Games was held on January 31, 2011 at Biathlon and Cross-Country Ski Complex, Almaty.

== Schedule ==
All times are Almaty Time (UTC+06:00)

Date	Time	Event
Monday, 31 January 2011	10:15	Qualification
Monday, 31 January 2011	11:16	Semifinals
Monday, 31 January 2011	11:44	Final

== Results ==
=== Qualification ===
Rank	Athlete	Time
1	Kohei Shimizu (JPN)	4:21.27
2	Alexey Poltoranin (KAZ)	4:22.88
3	Nikolay Chebotko (KAZ)	4:24.91
4	Yuichi Onda (JPN)	4:30.04
5	Im Yeui-gyu (KOR)	4:33.35
6	Lee Jun-gil (KOR)	4:33.61
7	Bijan Kangarloo (IRI)	4:35.32
8	Yasin Shemshaki (IRI)	5:00.54

=== Semifinals ===
==== Heat 1 ====
Rank	Athlete	Time
1	Kohei Shimizu (JPN)	4:24.6
2	Yuichi Onda (JPN)	4:27.1
3	Im Yeui-gyu (KOR)	4:34.2
4	Yasin Shemshaki (IRI)	5:06.6

==== Heat 2 ====
Rank	Athlete	Time
1	Alexey Poltoranin (KAZ)	4:23.9
2	Nikolay Chebotko (KAZ)	4:24.8
3	Bijan Kangarloo (IRI)	4:33.2
4	Lee Jun-gil (KOR)	4:41.9

=== Final ===
Rank	Athlete	Time
1st place, gold medalist(s)	Alexey Poltoranin (KAZ)	3:59.9
2nd place, silver medalist(s)	Nikolay Chebotko (KAZ)	4:00.0
3rd place, bronze medalist(s)	Yuichi Onda (JPN)	4:02.5
4	Kohei Shimizu (JPN)	4:11.8
