= Speed skating at the 2011 Asian Winter Games – Women's 1500 metres =

Women's 1500 metres at the 2011 Asian Winter Games
- Venue: Alau Ice Palace
- Dates: 4 February 2011
- Competitors: 11 from 6 nations

Medalists
gold medal	Wang Fei	China
silver medal	Noh Seon-yeong	South Korea
bronze medal	Nao Kodaira	Japan

The women's 1500 metres event was held on February 4. 11 athletes participated. The final was held from 15:05–16:22.

== Schedule ==
All times are Almaty Time (UTC+06:00)

Date	Time	Event
Friday, 4 February 2011	15:05	Final

== Records ==
Prior to this competition, the existing world and Games records were as follows.

World Record	Cindy Klassen (CAN)	1:51.79	Salt Lake City, United States	20 November 2005
Games Record	Wang Fei (CHN)	2:00.49	Changchun, China	31 January 2007

== Results ==
Rank	Pair	Athlete	Time	Notes
1st place, gold medalist(s)	4	Wang Fei (CHN)	1:58.37	GR
2nd place, silver medalist(s)	3	Noh Seon-yeong (KOR)	1:59.27	
3rd place, bronze medalist(s)	4	Nao Kodaira (JPN)	2:01.07	
4	5	Yekaterina Aydova (KAZ)	2:01.10	
5	6	Miho Takagi (JPN)	2:01.83	
6	3	Ji Jia (CHN)	2:01.85	
7	5	Lee Ju-yeon (KOR)	2:02.01	
8	2	Ko Hyon-suk (PRK)	2:02.93	
9	6	Tatyana Sokirko (KAZ)	2:05.99	
10	1	Hwang Sung-hui (PRK)	2:07.15	
11	2	Dalanbayaryn Delgermaa (MGL)	2:17.65	
