= Marina Lebedeva =

Kazakhstani biathlete (born 1985)

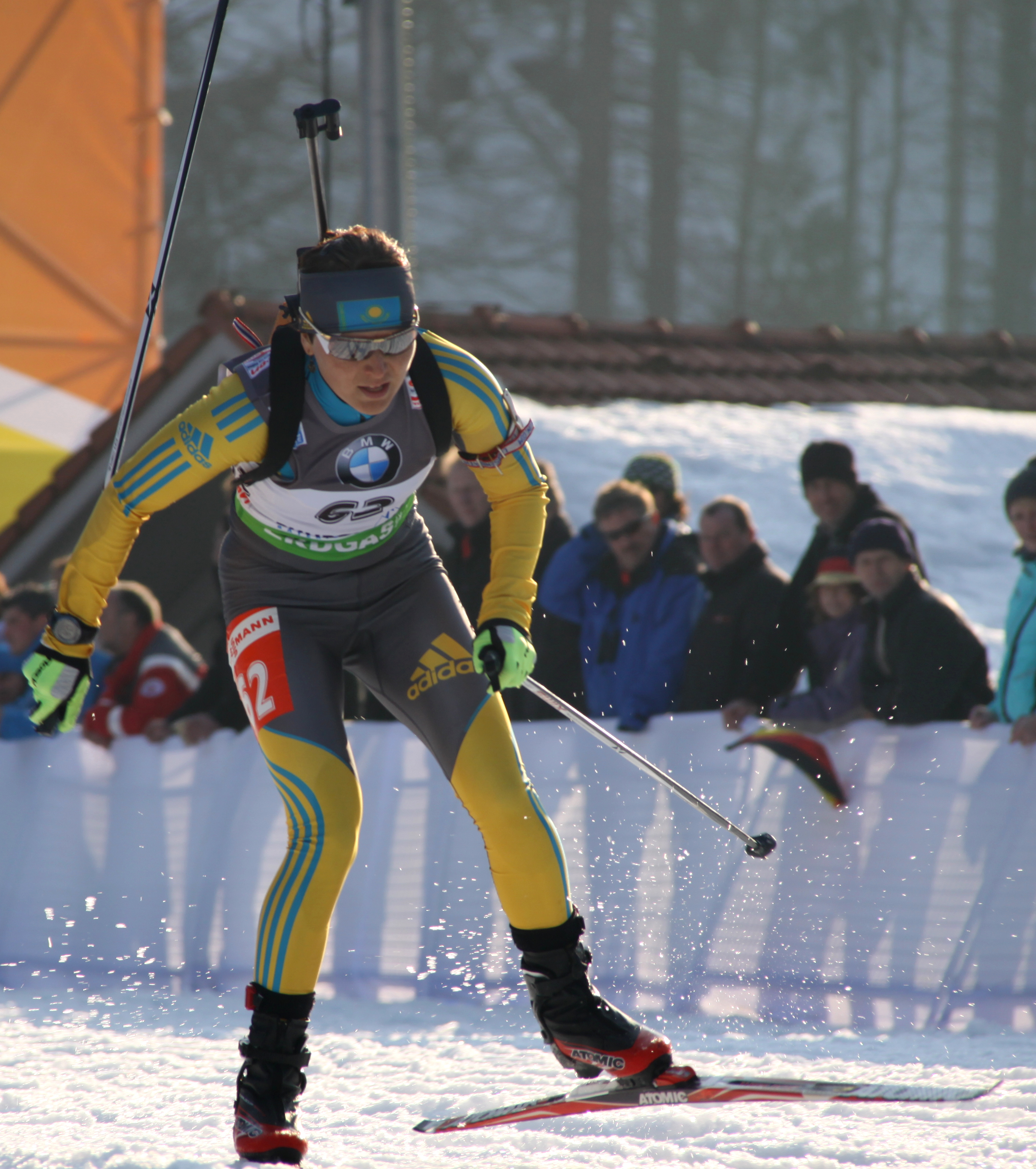

Personal information
- Born: 29 May 1985 (age 41) Aqkol, Kazakh SSR, Soviet Union
- Height: 1.65 m (5 ft 5 in)
- Weight: 54 kg (119 lb)

Sport
- Sport: Skiing
Medal record
Women's biathlon
Representing Kazakhstan
Asian Games
Gold medal – first place	2011 Astana-Almaty	4×6 km relay
Bronze medal – third place	2011 Astana-Almaty	7.5 km sprint
Bronze medal – third place	2011 Astana-Almaty	15 km individual
- Updated on 28 February 2013

Marina Lebedeva (born in Aqkol on 29 May 1985) is a Kazakh biathlete.

Lebedeva competed in the 2010 Winter Olympics for Kazakhstan. Her best performance was 14th as part of the Kazakh relay team. Her best individual finish was 58th, in the sprint She also placed 71st in the individual, and did not finish the pursuit.

As of February 2013, her best performance at the Biathlon World Championships is 11th, as part of the 2011 Kazakh mixed relay team. Her best individual performance is 36th, in the 2011 sprint.

As of February 2013, Lebedeva's best Biathlon World Cup result is 6th, in the individual race at Pokljuka in 2010/11. Her best overall finish in the Biathlon World Cup is 39th, in 2005/06.
