= Zhumagaziyev =

Zhumagaziyev is a surname (Kazakh: Жумагазиев). Notable people with the surname include:

- Dauren Zhumagaziyev (born 1989), Kazakhstani wrestler
- Nurbergen Zhumagaziyev (born 1990), Kazakh short track speed skater
