= Speed skating at the 2011 Asian Winter Games – Women's 3000 metres =

Women's 3000 metres at the 2011 Asian Winter Games
- Venue: Alau Ice Palace
- Dates: 31 January 2011
- Competitors: 9 from 5 nations

Medalists
gold medal	Masako Hozumi	Japan
silver medal	Kim Bo-reum	South Korea
bronze medal	Wang Fei	China

The Women's 3000 metres event was held January 31. 9 athletes participated. The final was held from 15:05–15:32.

== Schedule ==
All times are Almaty Time (UTC+06:00)

Date	Time	Event
Monday, 31 January 2011	15:05	Final

== Records ==
Prior to this competition, the existing world and Games records were as follows.

World Record	Cindy Klassen (CAN)	3:53.34	Calgary, Canada	18 March 2006
Games Record	Wang Fei (CHN)	4:13.08	Changchun, China	29 January 2007

== Results ==
Rank	Pair	Athlete	Time	Notes
1st place, gold medalist(s)	4	Masako Hozumi (JPN)	4:07.82	GR
2nd place, silver medalist(s)	3	Kim Bo-reum (KOR)	4:10.54	
3rd place, bronze medalist(s)	3	Wang Fei (CHN)	4:10.77	
4	2	Eriko Ishino (JPN)	4:13.65	
5	5	Park Do-yeong (KOR)	4:21.30	
6	2	Ji Jia (CHN)	4:21.32	
7	5	Yelena Urvantseva (KAZ)	4:41.82	
8	4	Viktoriya Lugovaya (KAZ)	4:42.60	
9	1	Dalanbayaryn Delgermaa (MGL)	4:58.10	
