= Speed skating at the 2011 Asian Winter Games – Men's mass start =

Men's mass start at the 2011 Asian Winter Games
- Venue: Alau Ice Palace
- Dates: 2 February 2011
- Competitors: 12 from 5 nations

Medalists
gold medal	Lee Seung-hoon	South Korea
silver medal	Hiroki Hirako	Japan
bronze medal	Dmitriy Babenko	Kazakhstan

The Men's Mass start event was held on February 2. 12 athletes participated.

== Schedule ==
All times are Almaty Time (UTC+06:00)

Date	Time	Event
Wednesday, 2 February 2011	15:45	Final

== Results ==
Legend

- DNF — Did not finish

Rank	Athlete	Time
1st place, gold medalist(s)	Lee Seung-hoon (KOR)	20:18.09
2nd place, silver medalist(s)	Hiroki Hirako (JPN)	20:21.45
3rd place, bronze medalist(s)	Dmitriy Babenko (KAZ)	20:21.48
4	Teppei Mori (JPN)	20:21.72
5	Alexandr Zhigin (KAZ)	20:21.83
6	Song Xingyu (CHN)	20:22.07
7	Li Bailin (CHN)	20:25.51
8	Park Seok-min (KOR)	20:29.39
9	Daiki Wakabayashi (JPN)	20:33.25
10	Maxim Baklashkin (KAZ)	20:35.14
11	Ko Tae-hoon (KOR)	20:47.67
—	Galbaataryn Uuganbaatar (MGL)	DNF
