= Speed skating at the 2011 Asian Winter Games – Men's 5000 metres =

Men's 5000 metres at the 2011 Asian Winter Games
- Venue: Alau Ice Palace
- Dates: 31 January 2011
- Competitors: 10 from 5 nations

Medalists
gold medal	Lee Seung-hoon	South Korea
silver medal	Dmitriy Babenko	Kazakhstan
bronze medal	Hiroki Hirako	Japan

The Men's 5000 metres event was held on 31 January. 10 athletes participated.

== Schedule ==
All times are Almaty Time (UTC+06:00)

Date	Time	Event
Monday, 31 January 2011	16:10	Final

== Records ==
Prior to this competition, the existing world and Games records were as follows.

World Record	Sven Kramer (NED)	6:03.32	Calgary, Canada	17 November 2007
Games Record	Hiroki Hirako (JPN)	6:39.71	Changchun, China	29 January 2007

== Results ==
Legend

- DSQ — Disqualified

Rank	Pair	Athlete	Time	Notes
1st place, gold medalist(s)	5	Lee Seung-hoon (KOR)	6:25.56	GR
2nd place, silver medalist(s)	2	Dmitriy Babenko (KAZ)	6:28.40	
3rd place, bronze medalist(s)	3	Hiroki Hirako (JPN)	6:33.66	
4	4	Artem Beloussov (KAZ)	6:35.35	
5	4	Ko Byung-wook (KOR)	6:36.71	
6	3	Sun Longjiang (CHN)	6:41.70	
7	5	Gao Xuefeng (CHN)	6:53.03	
8	2	Shota Nakamura (JPN)	6:55.36	
9	1	Galbaataryn Uuganbaatar (MGL)	7:21.11	
—	1	Galbaataryn Belgutei (MGL)	DSQ	
