= Cross-country skiing at the 2011 Asian Winter Games – Women's team sprint freestyle =

Women's team sprint freestyle at the 2011 Asian Winter Games
- Venue: Biathlon and Cross-Country Ski Complex
- Dates: 1 February 2011
- Competitors: 8 from 4 nations

Medalists
gold medal	Oxana Yatskaya; Yelena Kolomina	Kazakhstan
silver medal	Man Dandan; Li Hongxue	China
bronze medal	Naoko Omori; Yuki Kobayashi	Japan

The women's team sprint freestyle at the 2011 Asian Winter Games was held on February 1, 2011 at Biathlon and Cross-Country Ski Complex, Almaty.

== Schedule ==
All times are Almaty Time (UTC+06:00)

Date	Time	Event
Tuesday, 1 February 2011	10:05	Final

== Results ==
Rank	Team	Round 1/2	Round 3/4	Round 5/6	Time
1st place, gold medalist(s)	Kazakhstan (KAZ)				20:39.9
	Oxana Yatskaya	3:14.0	3:23.0	3:29.4	
	Yelena Kolomina	3:12.3	3:18.8	4:02.4	
2nd place, silver medalist(s)	China (CHN)				21:16.4
	Man Dandan	3:16.0	3:33.4	3:53.0	
	Li Hongxue	3:11.1	3:25.8	3:57.1	
3rd place, bronze medalist(s)	Japan (JPN)				21:34.4
	Naoko Omori	3:17.7	3:43.8	3:47.6	
	Yuki Kobayashi	3:29.1	3:28.2	3:48.0	
4	South Korea (KOR)				23:38.6
	Nam Seul-gi	3:37.3	4:05.3	4:01.6	
	Lee Eun-kyung	3:43.7	3:59.7	4:11.0	
