= Speed skating at the 2011 Asian Winter Games – Men's team pursuit =

Men's team pursuit at the 2011 Asian Winter Games
- Venue: Alau Ice Palace
- Dates: 6 February 2011
- Competitors: 12 from 4 nations

Medalists
| gold medal | Japan; Hiroki Hirako, Teppei Mori, Shota Nakamura |
| silver medal | South Korea; Lee Kyou-hyuk, Lee Seung-hoon, Mo Tae-bum |
| bronze medal | Kazakhstan; Dmitriy Babenko, Artem Beloussov, Alexandr Zhigin |

The men's team pursuit speed skating at the 2011 Asian Winter Games was held on February 6, 2011. 4 nations participated.

== Schedule ==
All times are Almaty Time (UTC+06:00)

| Date | Time | Event |
|---|---|---|
| Sunday, 6 February 2011 | 12:50 | Final |

== Records ==
Prior to this competition, the existing world and Games records were as follows.

| World Record | Netherlands | 3:37.80 | Salt Lake City, United States | 11 March 2007 |
| Games Record | — | — | — | — |

== Results ==
| Rank | Pair | Team | Time | Notes |
|---|---|---|---|---|
| 1st place, gold medalist(s) | 2 | Japan (JPN); Hiroki Hirako; Teppei Mori; Shota Nakamura | 3:49.18 | GR |
| 2nd place, silver medalist(s) | 1 | South Korea (KOR); Lee Kyou-hyuk; Lee Seung-hoon; Mo Tae-bum | 3:49.21 | |
| 3rd place, bronze medalist(s) | 2 | Kazakhstan (KAZ); Dmitriy Babenko; Artem Beloussov; Alexandr Zhigin | 3:49.56 | |
| 4 | 1 | China (CHN); Cheng Yue; Gao Xuefeng; Sun Longjiang | 3:51.13 | |
