= Speed skating at the 2011 Asian Winter Games – Men's 10000 metres =

Men's 10000 metres at the 2011 Asian Winter Games
- Venue: Alau Ice Palace
- Dates: 5 February 2011
- Competitors: 9 from 5 nations

Medalists
gold medal	Lee Seung-hoon	South Korea
silver medal	Dmitriy Babenko	Kazakhstan
bronze medal	Hiroki Hirako	Japan

The Men's 10000 metres event was held on February 5. 9 athletes participated.

== Schedule ==
All times are Almaty Time (UTC+06:00)

Date	Time	Event
Saturday, 5 February 2011	16:12	Final

== Records ==
Prior to this competition, the existing world and Games records were as follows.

World Record	Sven Kramer (NED)	12:41.69	Salt Lake City, United States	10 March 2007
Games Record	Shigekazu Nemoto (JPN)	14:34.72	Harbin, China	9 February 1996

== Results ==
Rank	Pair	Athlete	Time	Notes
1st place, gold medalist(s)	4	Lee Seung-hoon (KOR)	13:09.74	GR
2nd place, silver medalist(s)	5	Dmitriy Babenko (KAZ)	13:30.27	
3rd place, bronze medalist(s)	3	Hiroki Hirako (JPN)	13:34.97	
4	3	Ko Byung-wook (KOR)	13:39.42	
5	2	Artem Beloussov (KAZ)	13:50.86	
6	2	Teppei Mori (JPN)	13:52.56	
7	4	Li Bailin (CHN)	14:15.53	
8	5	Song Xingyu (CHN)	14:22.18	
9	1	Galbaataryn Uuganbaatar (MGL)	15:04.22	
