= Figure skating at the 2011 Asian Winter Games – Men's singles =

Men's singles at the 2011 Asian Winter Games
- Venue: Saryarka Velodrome
- Dates: 3–4 February 2011
- Competitors: 14 from 11 nations

Medalists
gold medal	Denis Ten	Kazakhstan
silver medal	Takahito Mura	Japan
bronze medal	Song Nan	China

The men's singles event was held over two days. On February 3 at 18:00 the short program was held while the free skating took place on February 4 at 17:30.

== Schedule ==
All times are Almaty Time (UTC+06:00)

Date	Time	Event
Thursday, 3 February 2011	18:00	Short program
Friday, 4 February 2011	17:30	Free skating

== Results ==
Rank	Athlete	SP	FS	Total
1st place, gold medalist(s)	Denis Ten (KAZ)	76.22	132.67	208.89
2nd place, silver medalist(s)	Takahito Mura (JPN)	67.78	139.10	206.88
3rd place, bronze medalist(s)	Song Nan (CHN)	66.54	134.56	201.10
4	Tatsuki Machida (JPN)	71.58	116.26	187.84
5	Wu Jialiang (CHN)	54.53	129.29	183.82
6	Misha Ge (UZB)	53.97	123.39	177.36
7	Abzal Rakimgaliev (KAZ)	56.43	114.38	170.81
8	Ri Song-chol (PRK)	56.25	109.17	165.42
9	Kim Min-seok (KOR)	58.09	106.33	164.42
10	Shih Wun-chang (TPE)	44.62	80.98	125.60
11	Lee Hau Yin (HKG)	41.03	83.54	124.57
12	Maverick Eguia (PHI)	33.43	74.89	108.32
13	Ryan Yee (MAS)	37.25	66.31	103.56
14	Karn Luanpreda (THA)	23.22	48.27	71.49
