= 2011 Asian Winter Games medal table =

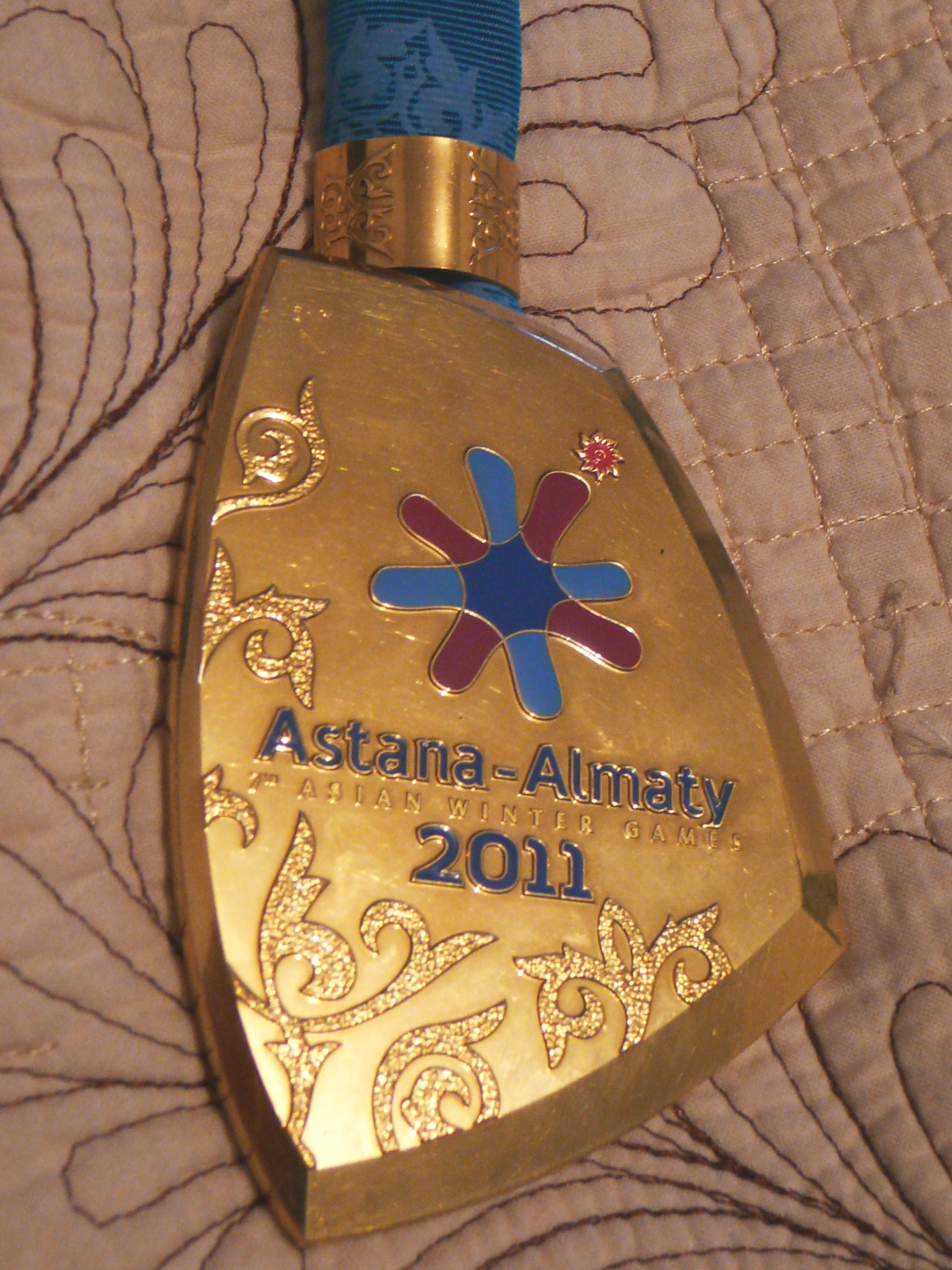
Gold medal.

The 2011 Asian Winter Games, officially known as the 7th Asian Winter Games, was a winter multi-sport event held in Astana and Almaty, Kazakhstan, from January 30 and to February 6, 2011. A total of 991 athletes representing 26 National Olympic Committees (NOCs) participated in these games, competing in 69 events from 11 different sports and disciplines.^{[a]}

Athletes from 8 NOCs won at least one medal, the most ever at any Asian Winter Games and athletes from 4 of these NOCs secured at least one gold. For the first time Kazakhstan led the medal table in its Asian Games history, with 32 golds and overall 70 medals. In doing so, it also broke the record for the most golds won by a NOC at a single Asian Winter Games (the previous was 29, set by the Japan in 1986). Kazakhstan's previous best was second place in 1996 in Harbin, China, with 14 gold medals, only one behind China. Athletes from Iran and Kyrgyzstan won the first Asian Winter Games medals for their nations.

== Medal table ==
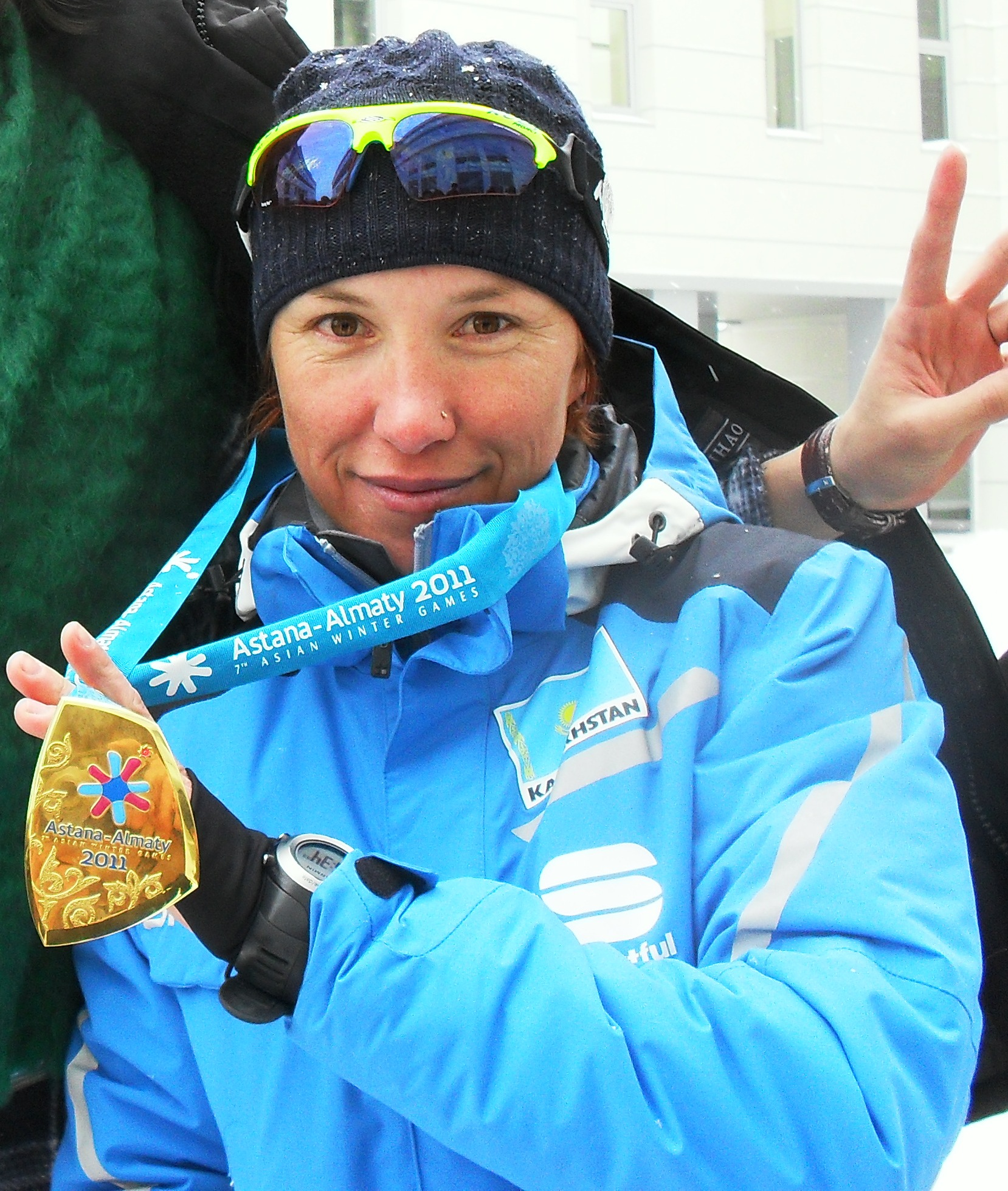
Oxana Yatskaya from Kazakhstan won two golds, one in Team sprint and other in 4×5 km relay.

The ranking in this table is consistent with International Olympic Committee convention in its published medal tables. By default, the table is ordered by the number of gold medals the athletes from a nation have won (in this context, a nation is an entity represented by a National Olympic Committee). The number of silver medals is taken into consideration next and then the number of bronze medals. If nations are still tied, equal ranking is given; they are listed alphabetically by IOC country code.

* Host nation (Kazakhstan)

Rank	Nation	Gold	Silver	Bronze	Total
1	Kazakhstan*	32	21	17	70
2	Japan	13	24	17	54
3	South Korea	13	12	13	38
4	China	11	10	14	35
5	Mongolia	0	1	4	5
6	Iran	0	1	2	3
7	Kyrgyzstan	0	0	1	1
7	North Korea	0	0	1	1
Totals (8 entries)		69	69	69	207

== Medal distribution ==
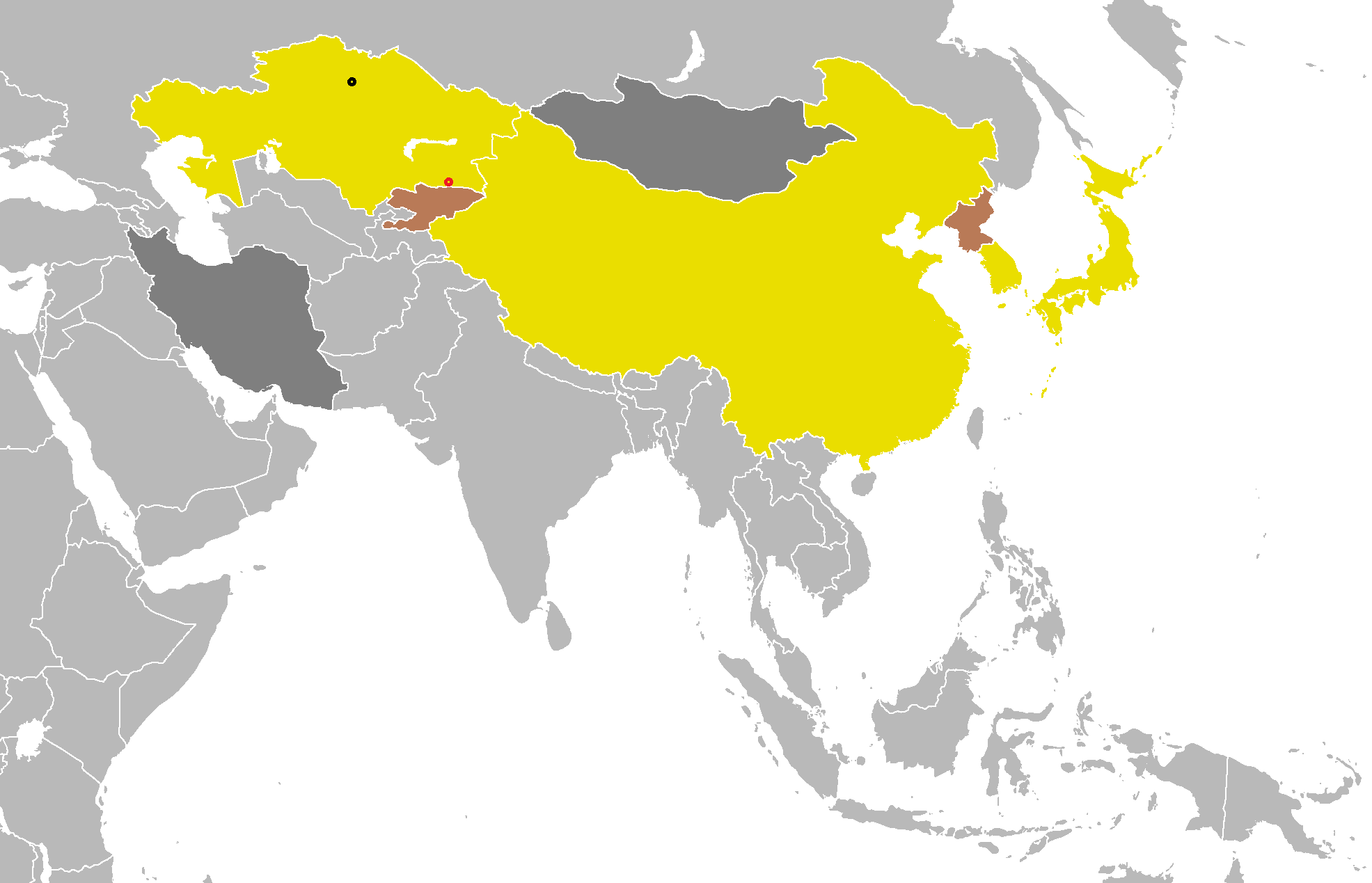
Participating NOCs with: at least one gold medal (*); at least one silver medal (†); at least one bronze medal (^). Red circle: Almaty and Black circle: Astana (Host cities).
1. China
2. North Korea
3. Iran
4. Japan
5. Kazakhstan
6. South Korea
7. Kyrgyzstan
8. Mongolia

== Notes and references ==
Note

^{a} There are sources, that display variations in the number of total participating nations, but Indonesia didn't send any athlete but an official who marched with a flag of Indonesia, so number of NOCs which sent athletes to the Games were 26, not 27.

References
General

"Over all medal standings - Astana–Almaty 2011". Olympic Council of Asia's official website. Archived from the original on October 4, 2022.

Specific
