= Aqkol, Almaty =

Aqkol
- Location in Kazakhstan Aqkol (Asia)
- Coordinates: 45°1′24″N 75°39′56″E
- Country: Kazakhstan
- Region: Almaty Region
- Time zone: UTC+6 (Omsk Time)

Aqkol is a village in Almaty Region of south-eastern parts of Kazakhstan.
