= Madoka Natsumi =

Japanese cross-country skier (born 1978)

Medal record

Women's cross-country skiing

Representing Japan

Asian Games
| Gold medal – first place | 2011 Astana-Almaty | Sprint |
| Silver medal – second place | 2003 Aomori | 4×5 km relay |
| Silver medal – second place | 2011 Astana-Almaty | 5 km |
| Silver medal – second place | 2011 Astana-Almaty | 4×5 km relay |
| Bronze medal – third place | 2007 Changchun | 4×5 km relay |

Madoka Natsumi (夏見 円, Natsumi Madoka; born July 2, 1978) is a Japanese cross-country skier who has competed since 1995. She earned the best individual finish of the host nation Japan at the FIS Nordic World Ski Championships 2007 in Sapporo with a fifth-place finish in the women's sprint event which was also her best individual finish at the FIS Nordic World Ski Championships.

Natsumi's best individual finish at the Winter Olympics was 12th in the individual sprint at Salt Lake City in 2002.

Her best individual World Cup finish was third at a sprint event in Sweden in 2008.
