= Hong Kong at the 2011 Asian Winter Games =

- IOC code: HKG
- NOC: Sports Federation and Olympic Committee of Hong Kong, China

in Astana and Almaty
- Competitors: 3 in 2 sports
- Flag bearer: Wang Xinyue
- Medals: Gold 0 Silver 0 Bronze 0 Total 0

Asian Winter Games appearances
- 1986; 1990; 1996; 1999; 2003; 2007; 2011; 2017; 2025; 2029

Hong Kong will participate in the 2011 Asian Winter Games in Almaty and Astana, Kazakhstan from January 30, 2011 to February 6, 2011. The nation will send 3 athletes Hong Kong sends 23 less athletes than it did in 2007, because the Ice hockey team will not compete.

== Figure skating ==
Men

Athlete(s)	Event	SP/SP		FS/LP		Total	
Athlete(s)	Event	Points	Rank	Points	Rank	Points	Rank
Harry Lee Hau-Yin	Men's	41.03		83.54		124.57	11

== Short track speed skating pictogram ==
Men

Athlete	Event	Heat		Semifinal		Final	
Athlete	Event	Time	Rank	Time	Rank	Time	Rank
Barton Lui Pan-To	500						
Barton Lui Pan-To	1000m						
Barton Lui Pan-To	1500m						

Women

Athlete	Event	Heat		Semifinal		Final	
Athlete	Event	Time	Rank	Time	Rank	Time	Rank
Wang Xinyue	500						
Wang Xinyue	1000m						
Wang Xinyue	1500m						
