= Yuki Kobayashi (skier) =

Japanese cross-country skier (born 1987)

Personal information
- Born: 1 November 1987 (age 38)

Sport
- Country: Japan
- Sport: Skiing
Medal record
Women's cross country skiing
Representing Japan
Asian Winter Games
Gold medal – first place	2017 Sapporo	5 km classical
Gold medal – first place	2017 Sapporo	10 km freestyle
Gold medal – first place	2017 Sapporo	15 km freestyle
Gold medal – first place	2017 Sapporo	4×5 km relay
Silver medal – second place	2011 Astana-Almaty	4×5 km relay
Bronze medal – third place	2011 Astana-Almaty	Team sprint
Bronze medal – third place	2011 Astana-Almaty	10 km freestyle

Yuki Kobayashi (小林 由貴, Kobayashi Yuki; born 1 November 1987) is a Japanese cross-country skier. At the 2011 Asian Winter Games she won a silver medal in the 4 x 5 kilometre relay. She competed at the FIS Nordic World Ski Championships 2011 in Oslo.
