= Yui Sakai =

Japanese short track speed skater

Medal record

Women's short track speed skating

Representing Japan

World Championships
Bronze medal – third place	2013 Debrecen	3000 m Relay

Yui Sakai (酒井 裕唯, Sakai Yui) (born 1987) is a Japanese short track speed skater. She competed at the 2010 Winter Olympics in Vancouver. She won a bronze medal in 500 metres at the 2011 Asian Winter Games.

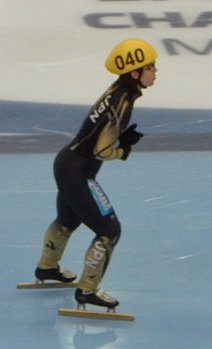
Moscow 2015
