= Biba Sakurai =

Japanese speed skater (born 1989)

Medal record

Women's short track speed skating

Representing Japan

World Championships
Bronze medal – third place	2013 Debrecen	3000 m Relay

Biba Sakurai (桜井 美馬, Sakurai Biba) (born 1989) is a Japanese short track speed skater. She competed at the 2010 Winter Olympics in Vancouver. She won a bronze medal in 1500 metres at the 2011 Asian Winter Games.
