= Li Hongxue =

Chinese cross-country skier

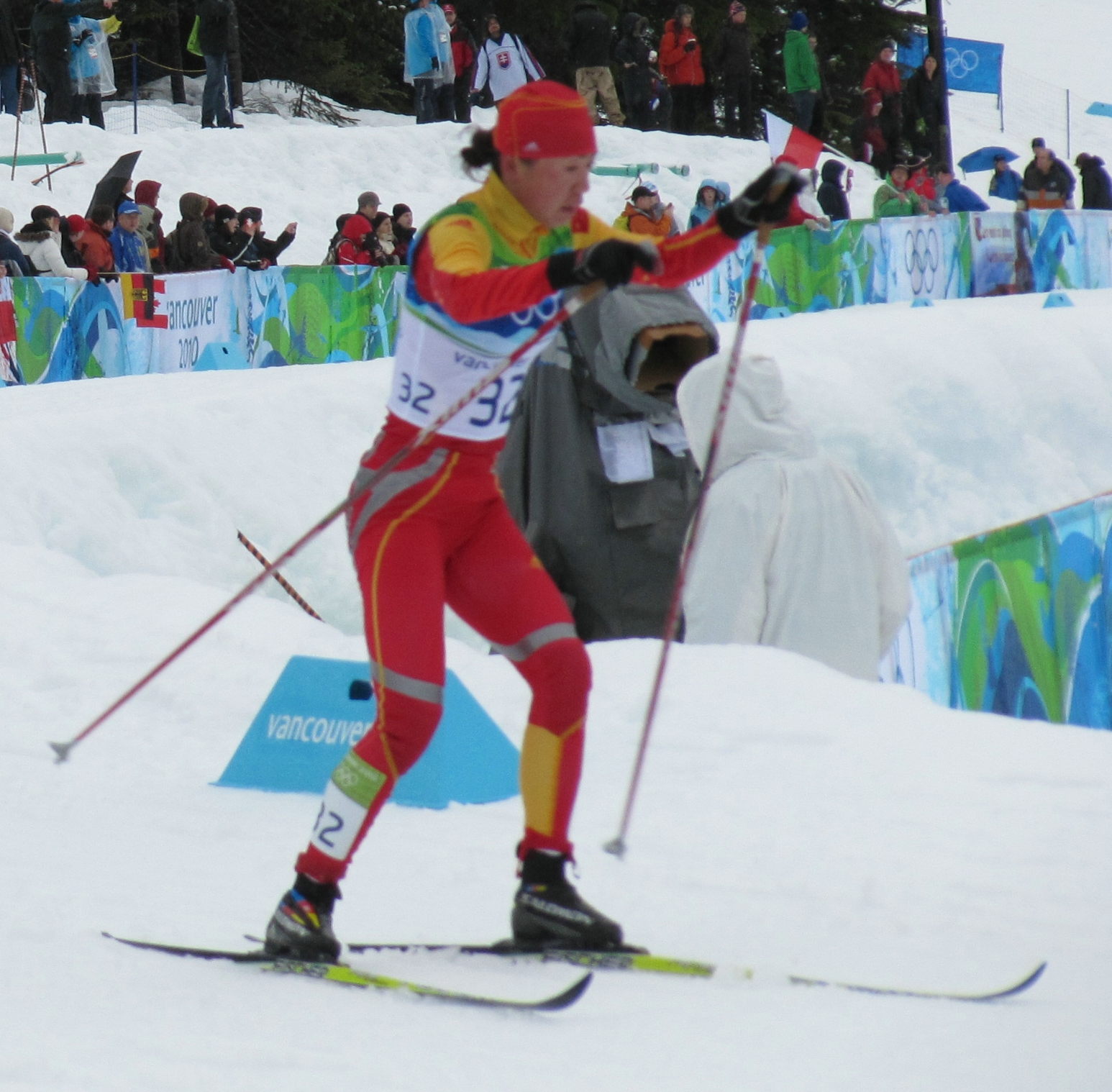

Medal record

Women's cross-country skiing

Representing China

Asian Winter Games
Silver medal – second place	2007 Changchun	4×5 km relay
Silver medal – second place	2011 Astana-Almaty	Team sprint
Silver medal – second place	2017 Sapporo	4×5 km relay
Bronze medal – third place	2003 Aomori	4×5 km relay
Bronze medal – third place	2011 Astana-Almaty	5 km
Bronze medal – third place	2011 Astana-Almaty	4×5 km relay
Bronze medal – third place	2017 Sapporo	5 km classical
Bronze medal – third place	2017 Sapporo	15 km freestyle

Li Hongxue (Chinese: 李宏雪; pinyin: Li Hóngxuě; born March 9, 1984, in Harbin, Heilongjiang) is a Chinese cross-country skier who has competed since 2003. Participating in two Winter Olympics, she earned her best finish of 16th in the 4 x 5 km relay at Turin in 2006. She also earned her best individual finish of 27th in the 7.5 km + 7.5 km double pursuit event at those same games.

Li's best finish at the FIS Nordic World Ski Championships was tenth in the 4 x 5 km relay at Sapporo in 2007 while her best individual finish was 18th in a 30 km event at those same championships.

Her best World Cup was 13th in an individual sprint finish at China in 2007.
