= Sung Si-bak =

Short track speed skater

Sung Si-Bak
Personal information
- Born: February 18, 1987 (age 39) Seoul, South Korea
- Height: 178 cm (5 ft 10 in)
- Weight: 65 kg (143 lb)

Sport
- Country: South Korea
- Sport: Short track speed skating

Achievements and titles
- Personal bests: 500m: 40.651 (2009, Former WR); 1500m: 2:12.978 (2008); 3000m: 4:45.035 (2005)
Medal record
Men's short track speed skating
Representing South Korea
Olympic Games
| Silver medal – second place | 2010 Vancouver | 500 m |
| Silver medal – second place | 2010 Vancouver | 5000 m relay |
World Championships
| Gold medal – first place | 2007 Milan | 5000 m relay |
| Gold medal – first place | 2008 Gangneung | 5000 m relay |
| Silver medal – second place | 2010 Sofia | 1500 m |
World Team Championships
| Gold medal – first place | 2009 Heerenveen | Team |
| Silver medal – second place | 2007 Budapest | Team |
| Bronze medal – third place | 2008 Harbin | Team |
Winter Universiade
| Gold medal – first place | 2005 Innsbruck | 1000 m |
| Gold medal – first place | 2005 Innsbruck | 5000 m relay |
| Gold medal – first place | 2007 Turin | 500 m |
| Gold medal – first place | 2007 Turin | 1000 m |
| Gold medal – first place | 2007 Turin | 1500 m |
| Gold medal – first place | 2007 Turin | 3000 m |
| Gold medal – first place | 2007 Turin | 5000 m relay |
Asian Games
| Gold medal – first place | 2011 Astana-Almaty | 5000 m relay |
| Bronze medal – third place | 2011 Astana-Almaty | 1000 m |
World Junior Championships
| Bronze medal – third place | 2003 Budapest | Overall |

Sung Si-Bak (Korean: 성시백; Hanja: 成始柏, Korean pronunciation: [sʌŋ.ɕi.bɛ̝k̚]; born February 18, 1987, in Seoul, South Korea) is a South Korean short track speed skater. At the 2007 Winter Universiade, he won all five short track speed skating events. Sung has won more than 20 World Cup races and earned two World Cup titles, in addition to skating on the winning World Championship 5000 m relay teams in 2007 and 2008. He qualified for the 2010 Winter Olympics in Vancouver, British Columbia, Canada. Sung was in medal contention leading into the final lap of the 1500 m event there, when a crash between him and a teammate led to his finishing in 5th place.

== Career ==
Sung began speedskating in elementary school at the behest of his parents, who hoped that it would help make him stronger. He nearly gave up the sport in order to continue his schooling, but chose to continue training as a professional speedskater.

Sung's career in the short track speed skating world cup has been a successful one. In the 500 m, he took first place in the 2007/2008 season, second in the 2008/2009 season, and third in the 2009/2010 season. In the 1500 m, he was first in 2008/2009 and third in 2009/2010. In total, he has won more than 20 World Cup races. He has also seen some success in World Championships. In 2007 and 2008, he was a member of the world champion 5000 m relay teams. He and his South Korean teammates also won the World Team Championships in 2009, having earned third place the previous year and second in 2007.

Sung was selected for the South Korean team at the 2010 Winter Olympics to compete in four events, the 500 m, the 1000 m, the 1500 m, and the 5000 m team relay.

In the first of these events, the 1500 m, Sung was among the three leading skaters, all South Koreans, going into the final lap when he was taken out by his teammate Lee Ho-Suk who attempted to pass him and both collided and slid into the wall. The fall allowed Americans Apolo Anton Ohno and J. R. Celski to take silver and bronze. Lee Ho-Suk was disqualified for causing the fall, and Sung who would have gotten silver, finished in 5th place.

In the heat race for the 1000 m competition, he set an Olympic Record with a time of 1:24.245. However, disappointingly he didn't advance to the finals as he finished third in the semi-finals. During the pre-finals of 1000 m, he was disqualified from the event for bumping another skater.

In the 500m Olympic Final, Sung was in the lead but slipped in the final corner before making contact with Charles Hamelin, and ended up crossing the finish line third. However, he was able to take the Silver medal due to a disqualification of Apolo Ohno.

== See also ==
- South Korea at the 2010 Winter Olympics
