= Aydar Bekzhanov =

Kazakhstani speed skater (born 1993)

Personal information
- Born: 20 May 1993 (age 33) Oral, Kazakhstan
- Height: 5 ft 9 in (175 cm)
- Weight: 154 lb (70 kg)

Sport
- Country: Kazakhstan
- Sport: Short track speed skating

Achievements and titles
- Highest world ranking: 20 (500m)
Medal record
Men's short track speed skating
Representing Kazakhstan
Asian Winter Games
Bronze medal – third place	2011 Astana-Almaty	5000 m relay
Universiade
Bronze medal – third place	2017 Almaty	5000 m relay

Aydar Bekzhanov (Айдар Бекжанов, born 20 May 1993 in Oral) is a Kazakhstani short track speed skater.

Bekzhanov competed for Kazakhstan at the 2010 Winter Olympics. In the 500 metres, he was disqualified in his first round heat, failing to advance. In the 1000 metres, he placed 4th in his opening heat, again failing to advance. His best overall finish was in the 1000, where he placed 28th.

As of 2013, his best performance at the World Championships came in 2010, when he placed 17th in the 1500 metres, and he has not finished on the podium on the ISU Short Track Speed Skating World Cup. His top World Cup ranking is 20th, in the 500 metres in 2013–14.

Bekzhanov also represented Kazakhstan at the 2014 Winter Olympics in the 500 metres, 1500 metres, and 5000 metre relay events.
