= Lee Chae-won =

South Korean cross-country skier

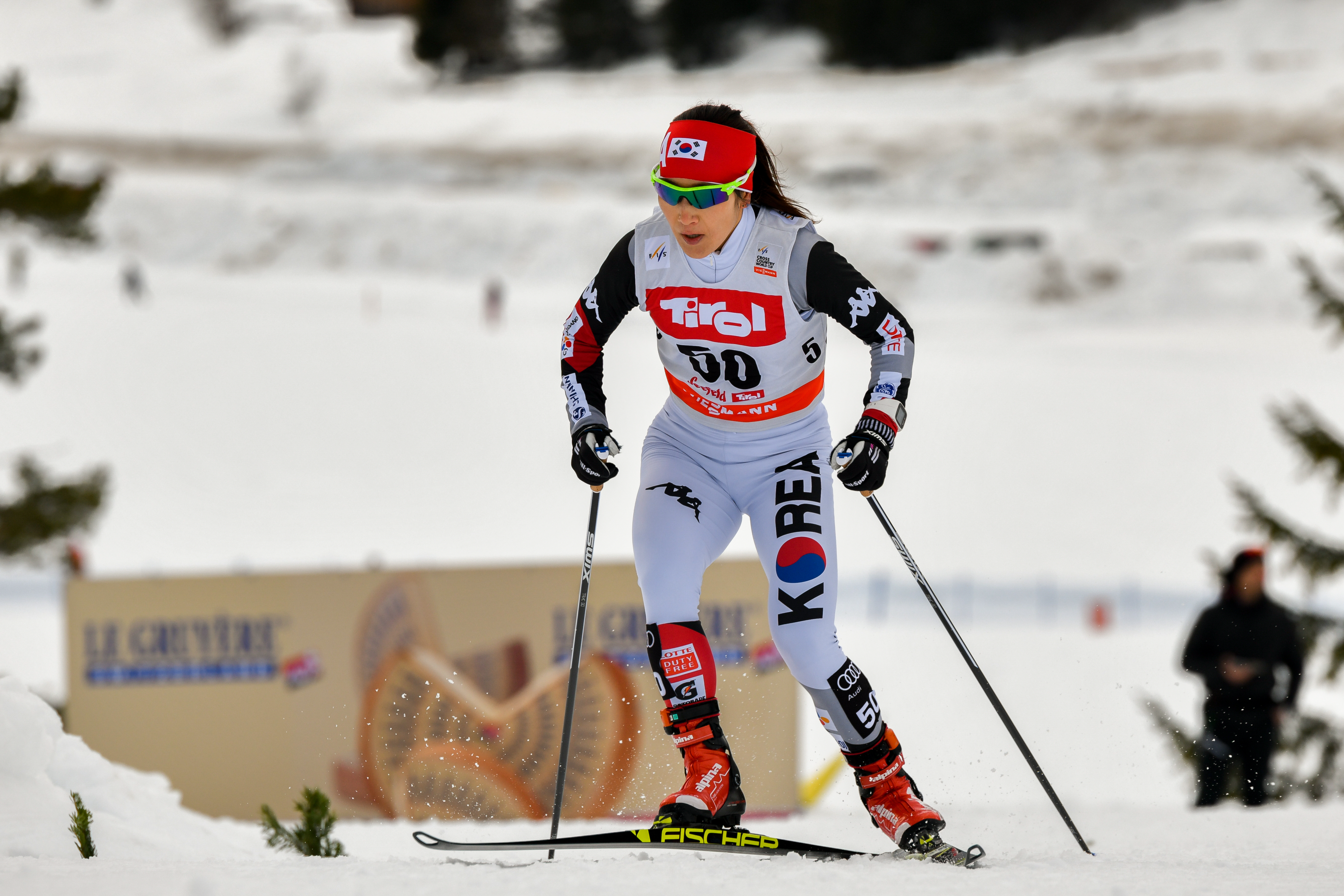

Medal record

Women's cross country skiing

Representing South Korea

Asian Winter Games
Gold medal – first place	2011 Astana–Almaty	10 km free
Silver medal – second place	2017 Sapporo	10 km freestyle
Silver medal – second place	2017 Sapporo	15 km freestyle
Bronze medal – third place	2017 Sapporo	4×5 km relay

- Lee Chae-won
- Hangul: 이채원
- Hanja: 李采洹
- RR: I Chaewon
- MR: I Ch'aewŏn

Lee Chae-won (Korean: 이채원; formerly Lee Chun-ja; born 7 April 1981) is a South Korean cross country skier who has competed since 1999. Competing in six Winter Olympics, she earned her best finish of 21st in the team sprint event at PyeongChang in 2018.

She was born in Pyeongchang County, Gangwon Province, South Korea.

Lee's best finish at the FIS Nordic World Ski Championships was 49th in the 10 km event at Oberstdorf in 2005.

Her best World Cup finish was 15th in a relay event in Sweden in 2008 while her best individual finish was 43rd in a 15 km mass start event at France that same year.
