= Man Dandan =

Chinese cross-country skier

Personal information
- Born: May 5, 1989 (age 37) Harbin, Heilongjiang, China
Medal record
Women's cross-country skiing
Representing China
Asian Winter Games
Gold medal – first place	2017 Sapporo	Sprint
Silver medal – second place	2011 Astana-Almaty	Team sprint
Silver medal – second place	2017 Sapporo	4×5 km relay
Bronze medal – third place	2011 Astana-Almaty	4×5 km relay

Man Dandan (simplified Chinese: 满丹丹; traditional Chinese: 滿丹丹; pinyin: Mǎn Dāndān; born May 5, 1989, in Harbin, Heilongjiang) is a Chinese cross-country skier who has competed since 2006. Competing in two Winter Olympics, she earned her best finish of 17th in the team sprint event at Vancouver in 2010 and earned her best individual finish of 51st in the individual sprint event at the same games.

Man's best finish at the FIS Nordic World Ski Championships was tenth twice (team sprint, 4 x 5 km) at Sapporo in 2007 while her best individual finish was 44th in the individual sprint event at those same championships.

Her best World Cup finish was eighth in an individual sprint event at China in 2007.

Man won gold in individual sprint event at the 2017 Asian Winter Games in Sapporo, Japan.
