= Han Jialiang =

Chinese speed skater (born 1987)

Han Jialing
Personal information
- Born: 22 October 22, 1987 (age 38) China
Medal record
Men's short track speed skating
Representing China
World Championships
Silver medal – second place	2009 Vienna	5000 m relay
World Team Championships
Bronze medal – third place	2010 Bormio	Team

Han Jialiang (simplified Chinese: 韩佳良; traditional Chinese: 韓佳良; pinyin: Hán jiāliáng; born October 22, 1987) is a Chinese short track speed skater. He represented China at the 2010 Winter Olympics in Vancouver.
