= Yuzo Takamido =

Short track speed skater (born 1988)

Personal information
- Born: 11 January 1988 (age 38) Ichinomiya, Aichi Prefecture, Japan

Sport
- Country: Japan
- Sport: Short track speed skating
Medal record
Men's short track speed skating
Representing Japan
World Championships
| Bronze medal – third place | 2009 Vienna | 5000 m Relay |

Yuzo Takamido (高御堂 雄三, Takamidō Yūzō; born 11 January 1988) is a Japanese speed skater. He competed at the 2010 Winter Olympics in Vancouver. He won a silver medal in 5000 metre relay at the 2011 Asian Winter Games.

== Personal life ==
Takamido was born in Ichinomiya, Aichi Prefecture, on 11 January 1988.
