= Nurbergen Zhumagaziyev =

Kazakh short-track speed-skater

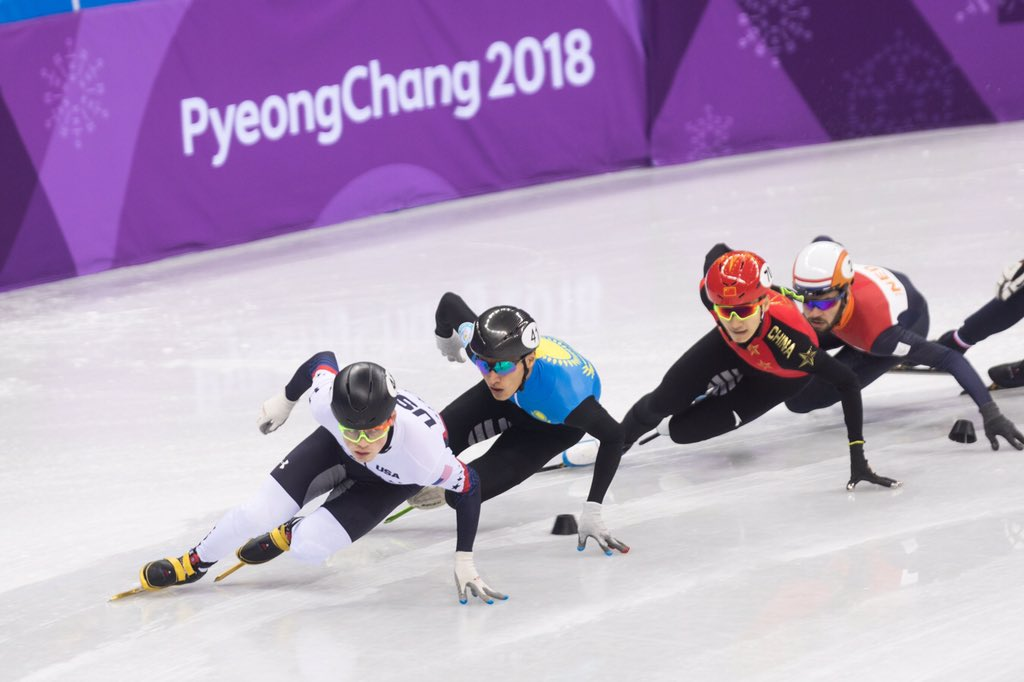
- Zhumagaziyev (second) at the 2018 Winter Olympics

Personal information
- Born: Nurbergen Batyrgalitovich Zhumagaziyev; November 29, 1990 (age 35) Oral, Kazakhstan
- Height: 172 cm (5 ft 8 in)
- Weight: 64 kg (141 lb)

Sport
- Country: Kazakhstan
- Sport: Short track speed skating
- Coached by: Madygali Karsybekov
Medal record
Men's short track speed skating
Representing Kazakhstan
Asian Winter Games
Bronze medal – third place	2011 Astana-Almaty	5000 m relay
Universiade
Bronze medal – third place	2017 Almaty	1500 m
Bronze medal – third place	2017 Almaty	5000 m relay

Nurbergen Batyrgalitovich Zhumagaziyev (Kazakh: Нурберген Батыргалитович Жумагазиев; born 29 November 1990 in Oral, Kazakhstan) is a Kazakh male short track speed skater.

== Biography ==
At the Asian Games in Alma-Ata, he competed in the individual races for 1,000 and 1,500 meters, as well as in the relay for 5,000 meters. In the relay, the team won bronze, at a distance of 1,000 meters came seventh. The fall of an athlete from Mongolia, which led to the fall of Nurbergen, prevented him from making it to the final of performances at 1,500 meters.

At the Olympic Games in Sochi, he competed in the individual 500-meter race and in the 5,000-meter relay. The personal result at 500 meters is 42.680 seconds and 29th place, in the relay together with the team showed a result of 6:54.630, which brought them 5th place.

== Coaching career ==
July 16, 2022 — appointed head coach of the Kazakhstan short track team.
