= North Korea at the 2011 Asian Winter Games =

- IOC code: PRK
- NOC: Olympic Committee of the Democratic People's Republic of Korea

in Astana and Almaty
- Competitors: 32 in 4 sports
- Flag bearer: Ri Song Chol
- Medals Ranked 7th: Gold 0 Silver 0 Bronze 1 Total 1

Asian Winter Games appearances
- 1986; 1990; 1996–1999; 2003; 2007; 2011; 2017; 2025; 2029

North Korea participated in the 2011 Asian Winter Games in Almaty and Astana, Kazakhstan from January 30, 2011, to February 6, 2011. The team is less than half the size that was sent to the 2007 games in Changchun.

== Medal summary ==
Sport	Gold	Silver	Bronze	Total
Figure skating	0	0	1	1
Totals (1 entries)	0	0	1	1

== Figure skating ==
Men

Athlete(s)	Event	SP/SP		FS/LP		Total	
Athlete(s)	Event	Points	Rank	Points	Rank	Points	Rank
Ri Song Chol	Men's	56.25	7	109.17	8	165.42	8

Athlete(s)	Event	SP/SP		FS/FS		Total	
Athlete(s)	Event	Points	Rank	Points	Rank	Points	Rank
Thae Won-hyok & Ri Ji-hyang	Pairs	53.60	3	89.44	3	143.04	3rd place, bronze medalist(s)

Ice dance

Athlete(s)	Event	SP/OD		FS/FD		Total	
Athlete(s)	Event	Points	Rank	Points	Rank	Points	Rank
Hong Ye-gyong & Choe Min	Ice dancing	31.43	5	49.32	5	80.75	5

== Ice hockey ==
Women

North Korea will send a women's team. The team consists of 20 athletes.

=== Group A ===
Rank	Team	Pld	W	OW	OL	L	GF	GA	GD	Pts
1st place, gold medalist(s)	Kazakhstan	4	3	1	0	0	21	3	+18	11
2nd place, silver medalist(s)	Japan	4	2	1	1	0	22	6	+16	9
3rd place, bronze medalist(s)	China	4	2	0	1	1	22	9	+13	7
4	North Korea	4	1	0	0	3	7	18	−11	3
5	South Korea	4	0	0	0	4	1	37	−36	0

All times are local (UTC+6).

January 28; 19:00	North Korea	0–3 (0–1, 0–0, 0–2)	Kazakhstan	Baluan Sholak Palace, Almaty; Attendance: 2,500

Game reference

Hong Kum-Sil (out 52:40)
Ri Hye-Yong (in 52:40)
Goalies
Darya Obydennova
Referee:
Kotoe Umemura (JPN)

0–1	07:56 – Yakovchuk (Sazonova, Shu) (PP)
0–2	42:51 – Konysheva (Sviridova)
0–3	52:40 – Tukhtiyeva (Potapova)

4 min
Penalties
8 min
17
Shots
50

January 29; 14:30	China	8–1 (1–1, 4–0, 3–0)	North Korea	Baluan Sholak Palace, Almaty; Attendance: 500

Game reference

Shi Yao
Goalies
Ri Hye-Yong (out 25:36, in 50:02)
Hong Kum-Sil (in 25:36, out 50:02)
Referee:
Erin Blair (USA)

Ma R. (Tang L.) – 11:07	1–0
	1–1	15:18 – Kim N.G. (Ri S.G.) (PP)
Qi X.T. (Jin F.L.) (PP) – 25:06	2–1
Sun R. (Zhang B.) – 25:18	3–1
Jin F.L. (Qi X.T.) (PP) – 35:24	4–1
Qi X.T. (Sun R., Zhang S.) (PP) – 36:45	5–1
Ma R. – 46:39	6–1
Ma R. – 50:02	7–1
Zhang B. (Jin F.L., Sun R.) – 57:40	8–1

4 min
Penalties
6 min
51
Shots
15

February 1; 14:30	North Korea	6–1 (2–1, 2–0, 2–0)	South Korea	Baluan Sholak Palace, Almaty; Attendance: 551

Game reference

Hong Kum-Sil
Goalies
Shin So-Jung
Referee:
Kotoe Umemura (JPN)

O C.O. (Kim S.H., Kim N.G.) – 08:24	1–0
	1–1	09:57 – Lee K.S. (Hwango Y.) (PP)
Ri Y.S. (Ri S.G.) (PP) – 11:20	2–1
Won C.S. (Kim S.H.) – 27:28	3–1
O C.O. (Ri Y.S.) – 37:10	4–1
Ro S.B. (Kim K.B., Ri S.G.) – 48:11	5–1
Ryu H.M. (Ri S.G.) – 52:17	6–1

6 min
Penalties
2 min
70
Shots
14

February 3; 11:30	Japan	6–0 (2–0, 3–0, 1–0)	North Korea	Baluan Sholak Palace, Almaty; Attendance: 500

Game reference

Azusa Nakaoku (out 40:00)
Shizuka Takahashi (in 40:00)
Goalies
Hong Kum-Sil (out 26:18, in 40:00)
Ri Hye-Yong (in 26:18, out 40:00)
Referee:
Arina Ustinova (RUS)

Hirano (Aoki) (PP) – 08:58	1–0
Shimozawa (Hirano) (PP) – 15:37	2–0
Yoneyama – 20:46	3–0
Kondo (Yoneyama) – 26:18	4–0
Hirano (Adachi) – 26:34	5–0
Sakagami – 55:42	6–0

10 min
Penalties
8 min
39
Shots
21

== Short track speed skating ==
Women

Athlete	Event	Heats		Semifinal		Final	
Athlete	Event	Time	Rank	Time	Rank	Time	Rank
Kim Jong-mi	500m	46.151	3	Did not qualify			
Hwang Hye-jong	500m	47.029	4	Did not qualify			
Ri Won-hyang	1000m	1:48.853	3	Did not qualify			
Ju Yun-Mi	1500m	2:41.122	4 QB			3:00.522	8
Kim Mi-Hyang	1500m	3:15.862	4 QB			3:00.662	9

== Speed skating ==
Women

Athlete	Event	Final	
Athlete	Event	Time	Rank
Ko Hyon-suk	500 m	96.34	10
Ko Hyon-suk	1500 m	2:02.93	8
Hwang Sung-hui	1500 m	2:07.15	10
Hwang Sung-hui	Mass start	18:12.45	10
