= Soldatskoe Valley Cross Country Skiing and Biathlon Stadium =

Sports venue in Kazakhstan

- Interactive map of Soldatskoe Valley Cross Country Skiing and Biathlon Stadium
- Location: Talgar District, Kazakhstan
- Coordinates: 43.27585°N 77.343524°E
- Capacity: 6,200 (1,900 seats, 1,300 standing, 3,000 temporary)
- Surface: 47 ha

Construction
- Groundbreaking: 2008
- Opened: 2010

Tenants
- 2011 Asian Winter Games; 2017 Winter Universiade

Soldatskoe Valley Cross Country Skiing and Biathlon Stadium, also known as "Alatau" Cross Country Skiing and Biathlon Stadium (Kazakh: «Алатау» шаңғы және биатлон стадиондарының кешені, Alataý shańǵy jáne bıatlon stadıondarynyń kesheni; Russian: Комплекс лыжного и биатлонного стадионов "Алатау") is a cross-country skiing and biathlon venue located at the Soldatskoye Valley in the Talgar District of Almaty Region, Kazakhstan.

== Characteristics ==
Situated around 30 kilometers (19 mi) from the town center and at 1,460 meters (4,790 ft) above mean sea level, it has one stadium area, both for cross-country and for biathlon. The venue was built for the 2011 Asian Winter Games and is homologated by International Ski Federation

The stadium buildings are located in the center of the complex, and the tracks are located taking into account the possibility of simultaneous competitions in both stadiums in different disciplines. In May 2021, the public organization "Alma-Qala'21" planted 50 trees on the territory of the complex.

The complex consists of two independent stadiums connected by a hotel and a service complex. The capacity of each stadium is 3,100 people, of which 1,800 seats and 1,300 standing seats.

The maximum length of the ski slopes is 10 km, which consists of two independent circles 5 km (red) + 5 km (blue). The maximum length of the biathlon trails is 4 km. The total length of the trails is 14 km.

== Competitions ==
The ski and biathlon complex regularly hosts biathlon and cross-country skiing competitions at the national level, such as championships and cups of Kazakhstan.

The complex also hosted a number of international competitions:

- 2011 - VII Asian Winter Games
  - biathlon
  - ski racing
  - ski orienteering
- 2014 - Asian Biathlon Championship
- 2017 - 28th Winter Universiade
  - biathlon
  - ski racing
  - Nordic combined (competitions were also held at the ski jumping complex)
