= Chinese Taipei at the 2011 Asian Winter Games =

- IOC code: TPE
- NOC: Chinese Taipei Olympic Committee

in Astana and Almaty
- Competitors: 32 in 5 sports
- Officials: 10
- Medals: Gold 0 Silver 0 Bronze 0 Total 0

Asian Winter Games appearances
- 1990; 1996; 1999; 2003; 2007; 2011; 2017; 2025; 2029

Chinese Taipei will participate in the 2011 Asian Winter Games in Almaty and Astana, Kazakhstan from January 30, 2011, to February 6, 2011. Chinese Taipei will send a higher number of athletes to an Asian Winter Games than have been sent previously.

== Alpine skiing ==
Chinese Taipei will send two alpine skiers.

Men

- Marcus Chen
- Micheal Chen

== Biathlon ==
Men

- Liu Yung-chien
- Wang Yao-yi

== Figure skating ==
Men

Athlete(s)	Event	SP/SP		FS/LP		Total	
Athlete(s)	Event	Points	Rank	Points	Rank	Points	Rank
Shih Wun-chang	Men's	44.62	10th	80.98	11th	125.60	10th

Women

Athlete(s)	Event	SP/SP		FS/LP		Total	
Athlete(s)	Event	Points	Rank	Points	Rank	Points	Rank
Liu Chao-chih	Women's	30.39	13th	61.83	11th	92.22	12th
Amanda Sunyoto-Yang	Women's	28.17	14th	57.80	14th	85.97	13th

== Ice hockey ==
Men

The team is in the top division for these games.

=== Group A ===
Team	GP	W	OTW	OTL	L	GF	GA	DIF	PTS
Kazakhstan	4	4	0	0	0	62	3	+59	12
Japan	4	3	0	0	1	32	6	+26	9
South Korea	4	2	0	0	2	35	16	+19	6
China	4	1	0	0	3	13	33	-20	3
Chinese Taipei	4	0	0	0	4	1	85	-84	0

All times are local (UTC+6).

January 31, 2011; 14:30	Chinese Taipei	v	South Korea	Kazakhstan Sports Palace (Arena 1)

February 1, 2011; 14:30	Japan	v	Chinese Taipei	Kazakhstan Sports Palace (Arena 1)

February 1, 2011; 19:00	Kazakhstan	v	Chinese Taipei	Kazakhstan Sports Palace (Arena 1)

February 4, 2011; 14:30	China	v	Chinese Taipei	Kazakhstan Sports Palace (Arena 1)

== Short track speed skating ==
Men

- Tsai Yu-lun
- Yang Bo-kai
- Yang Shun-fan
- Yang Yang-chun

Women

- Chung Hsiao-ying
- Lin Wei
- Tsou Mu-yin
- Yang Szu-han
