= Saryarka Velodrome =

Sports venue in Astana, Kazakhstan

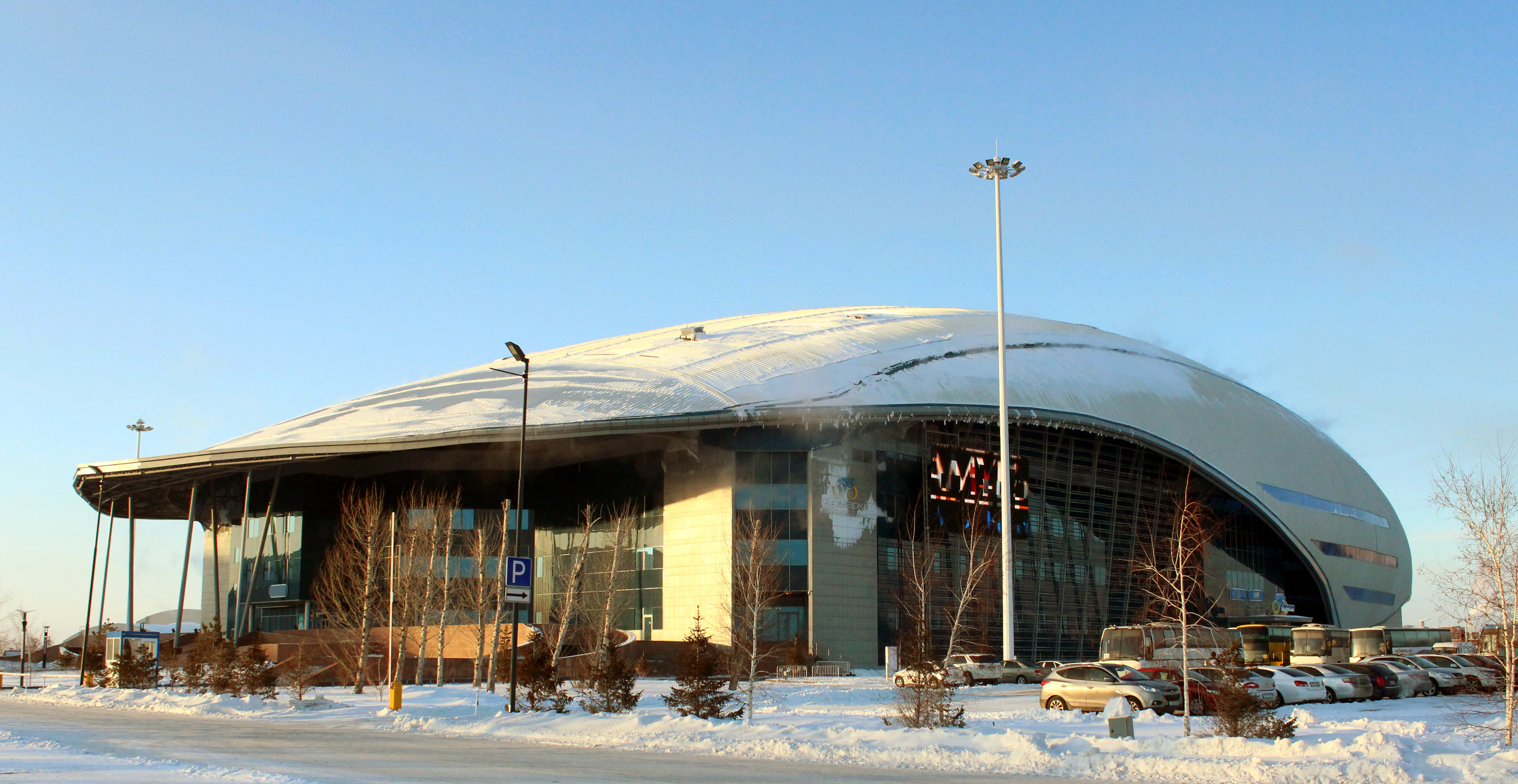
- Interactive map of Saryarka Velodrome
- Location: 45A, Qabanbay Batyr ave. Astana, Kazakhstan
- Coordinates: 51°6′17″N 71°24′18″E
- Capacity: Cycling: 9,270; Basketball: 10,000
- Surface: Siberian Pine

Construction
- Built: 2009–2011
- Opened: 2011
- Architect: Velotrack GmbH

Tenants
- BC Astana (VTB United League) (2012–present); Astana Pro Team (UCI World Tour) (2011–present)

Website
- www.velotrek.kz

The Saryarka Velodrome (Kazakh: Сарыарқа велотрегі, Saryarqa velotregi; Russian: Велотрек Сарыарка, romanized: Velotrek Saryarka) is an indoor cycle-racing track or velodrome that is located in Astana, Kazakhstan.

== Construction ==
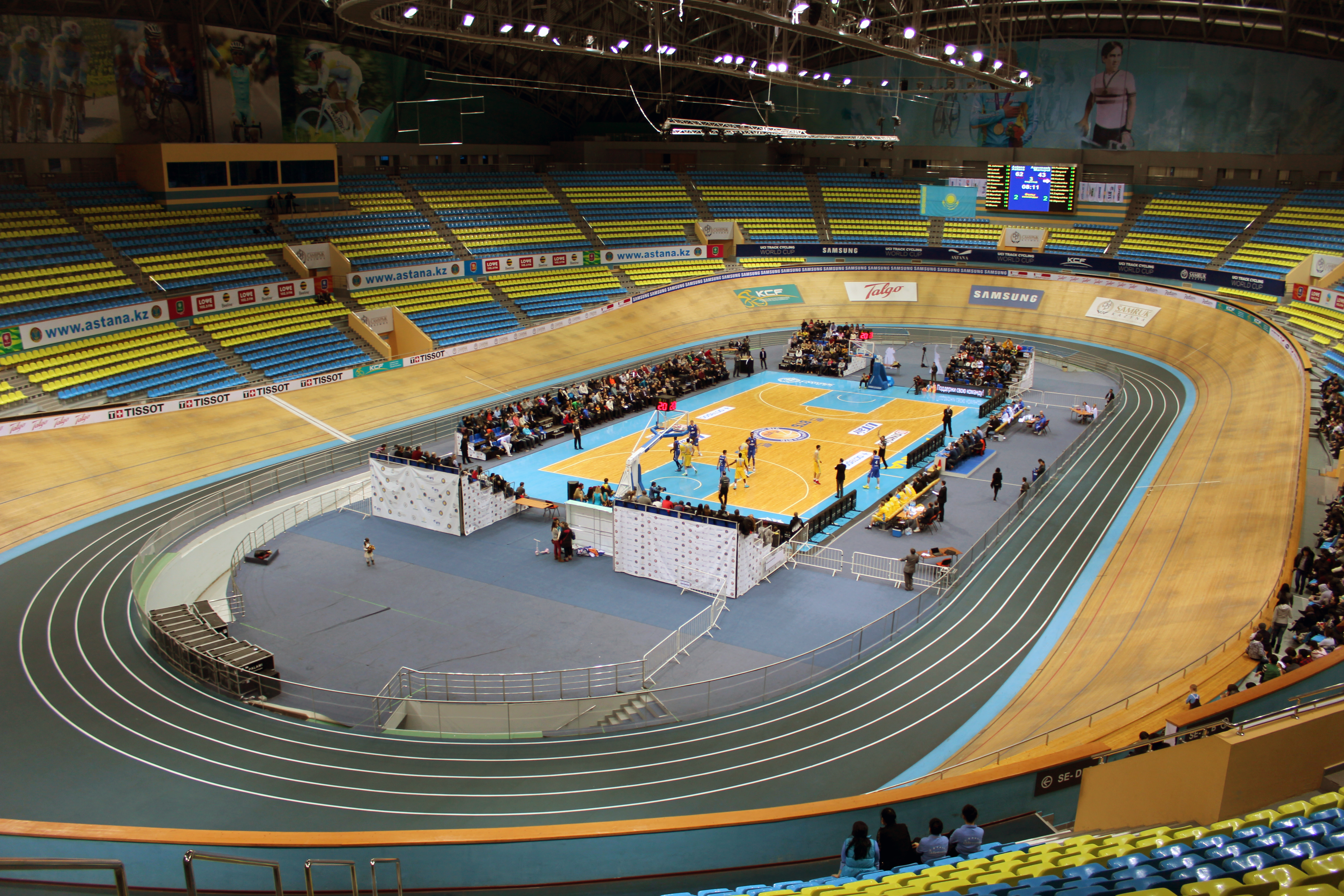
Interior during a basketball game

Constructed in the shape of a racer's helmet, the velodrome is a unique sports complex that not only houses a cycling track, but its 58,000 metre square surface area also contains a sports courts, a fitness centre, a swimming pool, a basketball court, an ice rink, as well as conference halls, a restaurant and a hotel. It is mainly used for cycling and basketball.

The seating capacity of the arena for cycling events is 9,270, being able to use only the permanent tiers of seating. Additional temporary tiers of seating can be added around the court area for basketball games, bringing capacity to 10,000.

== History ==
The track hosted the opening round of the 2011–12 UCI Track Cycling World Cup in November 2011. The arena was used during the 2011 Asian Winter Games for short track speed skating. It is the home arena of the VTB United League professional basketball club BC Astana.

== See also ==
- List of cycling tracks and velodromes
- List of indoor arenas in Kazakhstan
