= Japan at the 2011 Asian Winter Games =

- IOC code: JPN
- NOC: Japanese Olympic Committee

in Astana and Almaty
- Competitors: 102 in 8 sports
- Medals Ranked 2nd: Gold 13 Silver 24 Bronze 17 Total 54

Asian Winter Games appearances
- 1986; 1990; 1996; 1999; 2003; 2007; 2011; 2017; 2025; 2029

Japan participated in the 2011 Asian Winter Games in Almaty and Astana, Kazakhstan from January 30, 2011 to February 6, 2011.

== Figure skating ==
Japan will send 6 figure skaters.

Men

Athlete(s)	Event	SP/SP		FS/LP		Total	
Athlete(s)	Event	Points	Rank	Points	Rank	Points	Rank
Takahito Mura	Men's						
Tatsuki Machida	Men's						

Women

Athlete(s)	Event	SP/SP		FS/LP		Total	
Athlete(s)	Event	Points	Rank	Points	Rank	Points	Rank
Kanako Murakami	Women's						
Haruka Imai	Women's						

Ice dance

Athlete(s)	Event	SP/OD		FS/FD		Total	
Athlete(s)	Event	Points	Rank	Points	Rank	Points	Rank
Chris Reed & Cathy Reed	Ice dancing						
