= Alpine skiing at the 2011 Asian Winter Games =

- Venue: Shymbulak Alpine Sport Resort
- Dates: 31 January – 4 February 2011
- Competitors: 39 from 13 nations

Alpine skiing at the 2011 Asian Winter Games was held at Shymbulak Alpine Sport Resort in Almaty, Kazakhstan. The six events were scheduled for January 31– February 4, 2011.

== Schedule ==
F	Final

Event↓/Date →	31st Mon	1st Tue	2nd Wed	3rd Thu	4th Fri
Men's super-G		F			
Men's downhill	F				
Men's super combined					F
Women's super-G		F			
Women's downhill	F				
Women's super combined					F

== Medalists ==
=== Men ===
Event	Gold	Silver	Bronze
Super-G	Igor Zakurdayev; Kazakhstan	Dmitriy Koshkin; Kazakhstan	Mohammad Kiadarbandsari; Iran
Downhill	Dmitriy Koshkin; Kazakhstan	Igor Zakurdayev; Kazakhstan	Jung Dong-hyun; South Korea
Super combined	Jung Dong-hyun; South Korea	Igor Zakurdayev; Kazakhstan	Kim Woo-sung; South Korea

=== Women ===
Event	Gold	Silver	Bronze
Super-G	Kim Sun-joo; South Korea	Lyudmila Fedotova; Kazakhstan	Jung Hye-me; South Korea
Downhill	Kim Sun-joo; South Korea	Lyudmila Fedotova; Kazakhstan	Xeniya Stroilova; Kazakhstan
Super combined	Lyudmila Fedotova; Kazakhstan	Jeong So-ra; South Korea	Xeniya Stroilova; Kazakhstan

== Medal table ==
Rank	Nation	Gold	Silver	Bronze	Total
1	Kazakhstan (KAZ)	3	5	2	10
2	South Korea (KOR)	3	1	3	7
3	Iran (IRI)	0	0	1	1
Totals (3 entries)		6	6	6	18

== Participating nations ==
A total of 39 athletes from 13 nations competed in alpine skiing at the 2011 Asian Winter Games:

- Chinese Taipei (2)
- India (3)
- Iran (6)
- Jordan (2)
- Kazakhstan (4)
- Kyrgyzstan (2)
- Lebanon (2)
- Mongolia (4)
- Nepal (1)
- Palestine (2)
- South Korea (5)
- Tajikistan (2)
- Uzbekistan (4)
