= Alpine skiing at the Asian Winter Games =

- Governing bodies: FIS (World) / ASF (Asia)
- Events: 2 (men: 1; women: 1)

Games
- 1986; 1990; 1996; 1999; 2003; 2007; 2011; 2017; 2025
- Medalists

Alpine skiing has been featured as a sport in the Asian Winter Games since the first Winter Games in 1986.

== Editions ==
Games	Year	Host city	Best nation
I	1986	Sapporo, Japan	Japan
II	1990	Sapporo, Japan	Japan
III	1996	Harbin, China	Japan
IV	1999	Gangwon, South Korea	South Korea
V	2003	Aomori, Japan	Japan
VI	2007	Changchun, China	Japan
VII	2011	Almaty, Kazakhstan	Kazakhstan
VIII	2017	Sapporo, Japan	Japan
IX	2025	Harbin, China	Japan

== Events ==
Event	86	90	96	99	03	07	11	17	25	Years
Men's slalom	X	X		X	X	X		X	X	7
Men's giant slalom	X	X	X	X	X	X		X		7
Men's super-G			X	X			X			3
Men's downhill							X			1
Men's super combined							X			1
Women's slalom	X	X		X	X	X		X	X	7
Women's giant slalom	X	X	X	X	X	X		X		7
Women's super-G			X	X			X			3
Women's downhill							X			1
Women's super combined							X			1
Total	4	4	4	6	4	4	6	4	2	

== Medal table ==
Rank	Nation	Gold	Silver	Bronze	Total
1	Japan (JPN)	24	17	14	55
2	South Korea (KOR)	8	13	16	37
3	Kazakhstan (KAZ)	5	7	4	16
4	Lebanon (LBN)	1	1	0	2
5	China (CHN)	0	0	2	2
6	Iran (IRI)	0	0	1	1
6	North Korea (PRK)	0	0	1	1
Totals (7 entries)		38	38	38	114
