= List of Asian Games medalists in alpine skiing =

This is the complete list of Asian Winter Games medalists in alpine skiing from 1986 to 2025.

== Men ==
=== Slalom ===
Games	Gold	Silver	Bronze
1986 Sapporo	Naomine Iwaya (JPN)	Park Jae-hyuk (KOR)	Ri Jong-su (PRK)
1990 Sapporo	Keiji Oshigiri (JPN)	Hideto Ito (JPN)	Hur Seung-wook (KOR)
1999 Gangwon	Hur Seung-wook (KOR)	Joji Kawaguchi (JPN)	Choi Moon-sung (KOR)
2003 Aomori	Kiminobu Kimura (JPN)	Niki Fürstauer (LIB)	Tetsuya Otaki (JPN)
2007 Changchun	Yasuhiro Ikuta (JPN)	Kang Min-heuk (KOR)	Masashi Hanada (JPN)
2017 Sapporo	Jung Dong-hyun (KOR)	Kim Hyeon-tae (KOR)	Hideyuki Narita (JPN)
2025 Harbin	Takayuki Koyama (JPN)	Jung Dong-hyun (KOR)	Neo Kamada (JPN)

=== Giant slalom ===
Games	Gold	Silver	Bronze
1986 Sapporo	Tetsuya Okabe (JPN)	Chiaki Ishioka (JPN)	Park Jae-hyuk (KOR)
1990 Sapporo	Kiminobu Kimura (JPN)	Toshinobu Awano (JPN)	Takuji Kamibayashi (JPN)
1996 Harbin	Kenta Uraki (JPN)	Hur Seung-wook (KOR)	Byun Jong-moon (KOR)
1999 Gangwon	Joji Kawaguchi (JPN)	Hur Seung-wook (KOR)	Lee Ki-hyun (KOR)
2003 Aomori	Niki Fürstauer (LIB)	Tetsuya Otaki (JPN)	Masami Kudo (JPN)
2007 Changchun	Yasuhiro Ikuta (JPN)	Kang Min-heuk (KOR)	Kim Woo-sung (KOR)
2017 Sapporo	Yohei Koyama (JPN)	Kim Hyeon-tae (KOR)	Hideyuki Narita (JPN)

=== Super-G ===
Games	Gold	Silver	Bronze
1996 Harbin	Byun Jong-moon (KOR)	Kenta Uraki (JPN)	Azumi Tajima (JPN)
1999 Gangwon	Hur Seung-wook (KOR)	Joji Kawaguchi (JPN)	Choi Moon-sung (KOR)
2011 Astana–Almaty	Igor Zakurdayev (KAZ)	Dmitriy Koshkin (KAZ)	Mohammad Kiadarbandsari (IRI)

=== Downhill ===
Games	Gold	Silver	Bronze
2011 Astana–Almaty	Dmitriy Koshkin (KAZ)	Igor Zakurdayev (KAZ)	Jung Dong-hyun (KOR)

=== Super combined ===
Games	Gold	Silver	Bronze
2011 Astana–Almaty	Jung Dong-hyun (KOR)	Igor Zakurdayev (KAZ)	Kim Woo-sung (KOR)

== Women ==
=== Slalom ===
Games	Gold	Silver	Bronze
1986 Sapporo	Sachie Sato (JPN)	Waka Okazaki (JPN)	Jin Xuefei (CHN)
1990 Sapporo	Waka Okazaki (JPN)	Sachiko Yamamoto (JPN)	Makiko Ito (JPN)
1999 Gangwon	Rina Seki (JPN)	Olga Vediasheva (KAZ)	Yoo Hye-min (KOR)
2003 Aomori	Chika Takeda (JPN)	Hiromi Yumoto (JPN)	Oh Jae-eun (KOR)
2007 Changchun	Chika Kato (JPN)	Moe Hanaoka (JPN)	Oh Jae-eun (KOR)
2017 Sapporo	Emi Hasegawa (JPN)	Asa Ando (JPN)	Kang Young-seo (KOR)
2025 Harbin	Chisaki Maeda (JPN)	Gim So-hui (KOR)	Eren Watanabe (JPN)

=== Giant slalom ===
Games	Gold	Silver	Bronze
1986 Sapporo	Harumi Jin (JPN)	Sachie Sato (JPN)	Jin Xuefei (CHN)
1990 Sapporo	Sachiko Yamamoto (JPN)	Waka Okazaki (JPN)	Sachie Yoshida (JPN)
1996 Harbin	Olga Vediasheva (KAZ)	Fumiyo Uemura (JPN)	Tomomi Sato (JPN)
1999 Gangwon	Olga Vediasheva (KAZ)	Yoo Hye-min (KOR)	Yuliya Krygina (KAZ)
2003 Aomori	Reina Umehara (JPN)	Hiromi Yumoto (JPN)	Noriko Fukushima (JPN)
2007 Changchun	Emiko Kiyosawa (JPN)	Oh Jae-eun (KOR)	Kim Sun-joo (KOR)
2017 Sapporo	Emi Hasegawa (JPN)	Asa Ando (JPN)	Kang Young-seo (KOR)

=== Super-G ===
Games	Gold	Silver	Bronze
1996 Harbin	Fumiyo Uemura (JPN)	Olga Vediasheva (KAZ)	Junko Yamakawa (JPN)
1999 Gangwon	Yoo Hye-min (KOR)	Yang Woo-young (KOR)	Olga Vediasheva (KAZ)
2011 Astana–Almaty	Kim Sun-joo (KOR)	Lyudmila Fedotova (KAZ)	Jung Hye-me (KOR)

=== Downhill ===
Games	Gold	Silver	Bronze
2011 Astana–Almaty	Kim Sun-joo (KOR)	Lyudmila Fedotova (KAZ)	Xeniya Stroilova (KAZ)

=== Super combined ===
Games	Gold	Silver	Bronze
2011 Astana–Almaty	Lyudmila Fedotova (KAZ)	Jeong So-ra (KOR)	Xeniya Stroilova (KAZ)
