= Alpine skiing at the 2011 Asian Winter Games – Men's super-G =

Men's super-G at the 2011 Asian Winter Games
- Venue: Shymbulak Alpine Resort
- Dates: 1 February 2011
- Competitors: 24 from 13 nations

Medalists
gold medal	Igor Zakurdayev	Kazakhstan
silver medal	Dmitriy Koshkin	Kazakhstan
bronze medal	Mohammad Kiadarbandsari	Iran

The men's super-G at the 2011 Asian Winter Games was held on 1 February 2011 at Shymbulak Alpine Sport Resort in Almaty, Kazakhstan.

== Schedule ==
All times are Almaty Time (UTC+06:00)

Date	Time	Event
Tuesday, 1 February 2011	12:05	Final

== Results ==
Legend

- DNF — Did not finish
- DNS — Did not start
- DSQ — Disqualified

Rank	Athlete	Time
1st place, gold medalist(s)	Igor Zakurdayev (KAZ)	1:04.61
2nd place, silver medalist(s)	Dmitriy Koshkin (KAZ)	1:05.27
3rd place, bronze medalist(s)	Mohammad Kiadarbandsari (IRI)	1:07.52
4	Hossein Saveh-Shemshaki (IRI)	1:07.80
5	Artem Voronov (UZB)	1:11.02
6	Dmitry Trelevski (KGZ)	1:11.40
7	Marcus Chen (TPE)	1:12.37
8	Dmitriy Babikov (UZB)	1:13.02
9	Alexander Trelevski (KGZ)	1:13.78
10	Ganzorigiin Sodbayar (MGL)	1:15.36
11	Alisher Qudratov (TJK)	1:15.83
12	Michael Chen (TPE)	1:17.25
13	Jamyang Namgial (IND)	1:18.66
14	Tarek Fenianos (LIB)	1:19.14
15	Abdugafor Sharipov (TJK)	1:20.91
16	Hira Lal (IND)	1:21.75
17	Khaled Badreddin (JOR)	1:28.76
18	Raja Badreddin (JOR)	1:31.03
19	Chagnaagiin Bayarzul (MGL)	1:38.48
20	Prabin Karmacharya (NEP)	2:37.65
—	Jung Dong-hyun (KOR)	DNF
—	Philippe Araman (LIB)	DNF
—	Kim Woo-sung (KOR)	DSQ
—	Mohammed El-Batta (PLE)	DNS
