= 2011 Asian Winter Games opening ceremony =

The opening ceremony of the 2011 Asian Winter Games was held at the Astana Arena, in Astana, Kazakhstan. It began at 6:00 PM (UTC+06:00) on 30 January 2011 and lasted approximately three hours.

An estimated 30,000 were in attendance at the venue. There were an estimated 700 performers.

== Guests ==
- Faisal bin Al Hussein - Prince of Jordan
- Mohammed bin Zayed Al Nahyan - Crown Prince of Abu Dhabi
- Ahmed Al-Fahad Al-Ahmed Al-Sabah - Current IOC member representing Kuwait and president of the Olympic Council of Asia
- Nursultan Nazarbayev - President of Kazakhstan
- Jacques Rogge - President of the International Olympic Committee
- Roza Otunbayeva - President of Kyrgyzstan
- René Fasel - President of the International Ice Hockey Federation
- Imangali Tasmagambetov - Current mayor of Astana
- Alexander Zhukov - Deputy Prime Minister of Russia and President of the Russian Olympic Committee

== Program ==
=== Opening section ===
A dramatised performance based on traditional Kazakh epic poems accompanied by a group of ethnic drummers, which was followed by a volley of red fireworks began the show.

=== National anthem ===
Members of the Kazakhstan army marched the Kazakh flag to the flagpost. The anthem was then sung by Azamat Zheltyrguzov while the flag was risen.

=== Parade of Nations ===
Countries paraded in English alphabetical order, with Kuwait marching second-to-last (due to their suspension by the IOC) and Kazakhstan marching last as the host nation.

Below is list of countries that are confirmed to compete and their national flagbearers during the ceremony. All the countries were given warm receptions by the crowd, however a deafening welcoming roar was given to the home team.

Order	Nation	Kazakh	Flagbearer	Sport
1	Afghanistan (AFG)	Ауғанстан	Unknown	Chef De Mission
2	Bahrain (BRN)	Бахрейн		Ice hockey
3	China (CHN)	Қытай		
4	North Korea (PRK)	Солтүстік Корея	Ri Song Chol	Figure skating
5	Hong Kong (HKG)	Гонконг, Қытай	Wang Xinyue	Short track speed skating
6	India (IND)	Үндістан	Tashi Lundup	Cross country skiing
7	Indonesia (INA)	Индонезия	Unknown	Official
8	Iran (IRI)	Иран	Alidad Saveh-Shemshaki	Alpine skiing coach
9	Japan (JPN)	Жапония		
10	Jordan (JOR)	Иордания	No Flag bearer	-
11	South Korea (KOR)	Оңтүстік Корея	Park Woo-sang	Ice hockey
12	Kyrgyzstan (KGZ)	Қырғыз Республикасы		
13	Lebanon (LIB)	Ливан	No Flag bearer	-
14	Malaysia (MAS)	Малайзия	Haniff Mahmood	Ice hockey
15	Mongolia (MGL)	Моңғолия		
16	Nepal (NEP)	Непал	Unknown	Official
17	Palestine (PLE)	Палестина	Mohammed El Batta	Alpine skiing
18	Philippines (PHI)	Филиппин	Zhaira Costiniano	Figure skating
19	Qatar (QAT)	Катар	Thamer Al-Mohannadi	Speed skating
20	Singapore (SIN)	Сингапур	Lucas Ng	Short track speed skating
21	Chinese Taipei (TPE)	Қытайлық Тайбэй		
22	Tajikistan (TJK)	Тәжікстан		Alpine skiing
23	Thailand (THA)	Таиланд		Ice hockey
24	United Arab Emirates (UAE)	Біріккен Араб Әмірліктері		Ice hockey
25	Uzbekistan (UZB)	Өзбекстан		
26	Athletes from Kuwait (IOC)	Кувейт		Ice hockey
27	Kazakhstan (KAZ)	Қазақстан Республикасы		

==== Notes ====
- A few discrepancies occurred between the placards and announcers:
  - North and South Korea's placards bore their common names Солтүстік Корея ("North Korea") and Оңтүстік Корея ("South Korea") in Kazakh, and the abbreviations "DPR Korea" and "R.O. Korea" in English, though the Kazakh and English announcers both called out the full names "Democratic People's Republic of Korea" (Корей Халық Демократиялық Республикасы) and "Republic of Korea" (Корея Республикасы).
  - Hong Kong's placard bore the name "Hong Kong, China", though the announcers called out the name "Hong Kong" (in both languages).
  - Kyrgyzstan's placard bore the full name Қырғыз Республикасы ("Kyrgyz Republic") in Kazakh, though the English portion of the placard and both announcers used "Kyrgyzstan" (Қырғызстан).
  - Similarly, host Kazakhstan's placard bore the full name Қазақстан Республикасы ("Republic of Kazakhstan") in Kazakh, though the English placard portion and both announcers used "Kazakhstan" (Қазақстан).
  - Kuwait's placard bore the name Кувейт ("Kuwait") in Kazakh and the name "Athletes from Kuwait" in English. Both announcers called out "Kuwait".
- Indonesia had no athletes competing, rather officials participating.
- Jordan and Lebanon were announced to the crowd and had placard bearers, but were followed by no members of the delegation (including no flag bearer or flag). Jordan's placard bearer marched before Lebanon (after Kyrgyzstan), though the announcers used the correct alphabetical order. Thus no placard bearer came out when Jordan was announced, and both Jordan and Lebanon's placard bearers came out (with some distance in between) when Lebanon was announced.

=== Cultural Program ===
Included in the cultural show was the history of Kazakhstan, with a bird's eye view from an eagle swooping over the vast plains. With dance, song and distinctive musical instruments, the props came to life – notably when water cascaded from the top of the set and lighting transformed the stage into a rough sea to rock the boat looking for new lands.

Also, "The gift packs for the visitors inside the 30,000-seat indoor football stadium included a bag of four snowball-size white sponge balls. Taking their lead from a band of tiny-tot performers dressed as flowers towards the end of the cultural show, the audience opened their packet of "snowballs" and proceeded to pelt anyone and everyone in sight"

Notable songs performed during this program, composed by Igor Krutoy include;

- La fantasia - Nurzhamal Usenbaeva
- My Star (Also known as; New Year) - Roza Rymbayeva and Batyrkhan Shukenov
- Ulisse - Talgat Musabayev (not to be confused with the Kazakh cosmonaut of the same name)
- Always - Lara Fabian

=== Entry of the Olympic Council of Asia Flag ===
6 famous athletes and coaches carried the flag. They were:

- Hwan Mai - Coach
- Serik Konakbayev - Former Olympic silver medalist in boxing for the USSR at the 1980 Summer Olympics.
- Kenzhe Sarsekenova - Coach
- Lyudmila Prokasheva - Former Olympic bronze medalist speed skater for Kazakhstan at the 1998 Winter Olympics.
- Vladimir Smirnov - Former multiple Olympic medalist cross-country skier for Kazakhstan and the USSR.
- Aliya Yussupova - Multiple gold medalist rhythmic gymnast at the 2006 Asian Games.

=== Oaths ===
The athletes and jury pronounced solemn oaths before the banner of the Olympic Council of Asia.

=== Opening remarks/Official Opening ===
The mayor of Astana Imangali Tasmagambetov gave a speech. "The Asiad is being held by Kazakhstan due to the initiative of President Nursultan Nazarbayev. The victory of an athlete is the victory of the country".

This was followed by president of the Olympic council of Asia Ahmed Al-Fahad Al-Ahmed Al-Sabah also giving a welcoming speech. "Kazakhstan is a very respectful member of the international sport community. The Olympic Council of Asia congratulates President Nursultan Nazarbayev, the Government of Kazakhstan, mayors and people of Astana and Almaty".

The games were then officially opened by the president of Kazakhstan, Nursultan Nazarbayev.

=== Lighting of the Cauldron ===
The Olympic torch relay, which had criss-crossed the country during January, arrived at its final destination at the Astana Arena, with a group of the country's most decorated sports veterans jointly lighting the Games flame.

This followed by Korean oprea singer Sumi Jo singing "Angels Pass Away".

Finally, another barrage of fireworks that lit up the night sky of the Kazakhstan capital to close the show.
