= Alpine skiing at the 2011 Asian Winter Games – Men's super combined =

Men's super combined at the 2011 Asian Winter Games
- Venue: Shymbulak Alpine Resort
- Dates: 4 February 2011
- Competitors: 21 from 12 nations

Medalists
gold medal	Jung Dong-hyun	South Korea
silver medal	Igor Zakurdayev	Kazakhstan
bronze medal	Kim Woo-sung	South Korea

The men's super combined at the 2011 Asian Winter Games was held on 4 February 2011 at Shymbulak Alpine Sport Resort in Almaty, Kazakhstan.

== Schedule ==
All times are Almaty Time (UTC+06:00)

Date	Time	Event
Friday, 4 February 2011	10:45	Super−G
Friday, 4 February 2011	13:30	Slalom

== Results ==
Legend

- DNF — Did not finish
- DNS — Did not start
- DSQ — Disqualified

Rank	Athlete	Super-G	Slalom	Total
1st place, gold medalist(s)	Jung Dong-hyun (KOR)	1:04.40	41.30	1:45.70
2nd place, silver medalist(s)	Igor Zakurdayev (KAZ)	1:03.52	42.30	1:45.82
3rd place, bronze medalist(s)	Kim Woo-sung (KOR)	1:05.13	42.61	1:47.74
4	Hossein Saveh-Shemshaki (IRI)	1:05.77	42.77	1:48.54
5	Pouria Saveh-Shemshaki (IRI)	1:05.97	42.96	1:48.93
6	Artem Voronov (UZB)	1:08.56	46.41	1:54.97
7	Alexander Trelevski (KGZ)	1:08.49	47.96	1:56.45
8	Dmitriy Babikov (UZB)	1:09.14	49.66	1:58.80
9	Tarek Fenianos (LIB)	1:12.60	49.81	2:02.41
10	Michael Chen (TPE)	1:12.86	50.44	2:03.30
11	Marcus Chen (TPE)	1:09.02	58.17	2:07.19
12	Hira Lal (IND)	1:15.42	59.67	2:15.09
13	Ludar Chand (IND)	1:22.12	57.27	2:19.39
14	Raja Badreddin (JOR)	1:25.84	1:08.52	2:34.36
—	Alisher Qudratov (TJK)	1:13.70	DNF	DNF
—	Abdugafor Sharipov (TJK)	1:13.37	DNF	DNF
—	Chagnaagiin Bayarzul (MGL)	1:28.16	DSQ	DSQ
—	Ganzorigiin Sodbayar (MGL)	DNF		DNF
—	Dmitriy Koshkin (KAZ)	DNF		DNF
—	Dmitry Trelevski (KGZ)	DNS		DNS
—	Mohammed El-Batta (PLE)	DNS		DNS
