= Alpine skiing at the 2011 Asian Winter Games – Men's downhill =

Men's downhill at the 2011 Asian Winter Games
- Venue: Shymbulak Alpine Resort
- Dates: 31 January 2011
- Competitors: 16 from 8 nations

Medalists
| gold medal | Dmitriy Koshkin | Kazakhstan |
| silver medal | Igor Zakurdayev | Kazakhstan |
| bronze medal | Jung Dong-hyun | South Korea |

The men's downhill at the 2011 Asian Winter Games was held on January 31, 2011, at Shymbulak Alpine Sport Resort in Almaty, Kazakhstan.

== Schedule ==
All times are Almaty Time (UTC+06:00)

| Date | Time | Event |
|---|---|---|
| Monday, 31 January 2011 | 11:05 | Final |

== Results ==
Legend

- DNF — Did not finish

| Rank | Athlete | Time |
|---|---|---|
| 1st place, gold medalist(s) | Dmitriy Koshkin (KAZ) | 1:27.52 |
| 2nd place, silver medalist(s) | Igor Zakurdayev (KAZ) | 1:28.11 |
| 3rd place, bronze medalist(s) | Jung Dong-hyun (KOR) | 1:29.78 |
| 4 | Hossein Saveh-Shemshaki (IRI) | 1:30.40 |
| 5 | Mohammad Kiadarbandsari (IRI) | 1:30.94 |
| 6 | Kim Woo-sung (KOR) | 1:31.67 |
| 7 | Artem Voronov (UZB) | 1:34.66 |
| 8 | Dmitry Trelevski (KGZ) | 1:35.44 |
| 9 | Alexander Trelevski (KGZ) | 1:37.21 |
| 10 | Marcus Chen (TPE) | 1:39.66 |
| 11 | Michael Chen (TPE) | 1:42.59 |
| 12 | Ganzorigiin Sodbayar (MGL) | 1:43.50 |
| 13 | Tarek Fenianos (LIB) | 1:45.25 |
| 14 | Philippe Araman (LIB) | 1:49.15 |
| — | Chagnaagiin Bayarzul (MGL) | DNF |
| — | Dmitriy Babikov (UZB) | DNF |
