= Alpine skiing at the 2011 Asian Winter Games – Women's super combined =

Women's super combined at the 2011 Asian Winter Games
- Venue: Shymbulak Alpine Resort
- Dates: 4 February 2011
- Competitors: 11 from 6 nations

Medalists
gold medal	Lyudmila Fedotova	Kazakhstan
silver medal	Jeong So-ra	South Korea
bronze medal	Xeniya Stroilova	Kazakhstan

The women's super combined at the 2011 Asian Winter Games was held on 4 February 2011 at the Shymbulak Alpine Sport Resort in Almaty, Kazakhstan.

== Schedule ==
All times are Almaty Time (UTC+06:00)

Date	Time	Event
Friday, 4 February 2011	10:05	Super−G
Friday, 4 February 2011	13:05	Slalom

== Results ==
Legend

- DNF — Did not finish
- DNS — Did not start
- DSQ — Disqualified

Rank	Athlete	Super-G	Slalom	Total
1st place, gold medalist(s)	Lyudmila Fedotova (KAZ)	1:08.67	52.74	2:01.41
2nd place, silver medalist(s)	Jeong So-ra (KOR)	1:12.77	50.87	2:03.64
3rd place, bronze medalist(s)	Xeniya Stroilova (KAZ)	1:12.22	52.05	2:04.27
4	Marjan Kalhor (IRI)	1:13.52	51.86	2:05.38
5	Ziba Kalhor (IRI)	1:13.81	52.40	2:06.21
6	Kseniya Grigoreva (UZB)	1:12.43	57.47	2:09.90
—	Altanzulyn Ariunzayaa (MGL)	1:33.01	DNF	DNF
—	Svetlana Baranova (UZB)	1:15.85	DNF	DNF
—	Kim Sun-joo (KOR)	1:08.31	DSQ	DSQ
—	Jargalsürengiin Tögszayaa (MGL)	2:34.76	DSQ	DSQ
—	Arwa El-Batta (PLE)	DNS		DNS
