= Alpine skiing at the 2011 Asian Winter Games – Women's super-G =

Women's super-G at the 2011 Asian Winter Games
- Venue: Shymbulak Alpine Resort
- Dates: 1 February 2011
- Competitors: 10 from 6 nations

Medalists
gold medal	Kim Sun-joo	South Korea
silver medal	Lyudmila Fedotova	Kazakhstan
bronze medal	Jung Hye-me	South Korea

The women's super-G at the 2011 Asian Winter Games was held on 1 February 2011 at Shymbulak Alpine Sport Resort in Almaty, Kazakhstan.

== Schedule ==
All times are Almaty Time (UTC+06:00)

Date	Time	Event
Tuesday, 1 February 2011	13:05	Final

== Results ==
Legend

- DNF — Did not finish

Rank	Athlete	Time
1st place, gold medalist(s)	Kim Sun-joo (KOR)	1:10.83
2nd place, silver medalist(s)	Lyudmila Fedotova (KAZ)	1:11.33
3rd place, bronze medalist(s)	Jung Hye-me (KOR)	1:12.31
4	Xeniya Stroilova (KAZ)	1:15.28
5	Marjan Kalhor (IRI)	1:16.41
6	Kseniya Grigoreva (UZB)	1:16.44
7	Mitra Kalhor (IRI)	1:20.94
8	Svetlana Baranova (UZB)	1:21.95
9	Altanzulyn Ariunzayaa (MGL)	1:52.37
—	Arwa El-Batta (PLE)	DNF
