= Big Shymbulak falls =

Kazakhstani waterfall

Coordinates: 43.0861°N 76.4147°E

The waterfall is located in a deep and narrow rock canyon in Kazakhstan, 400 meters from the main gorge. The canyon has a narrow possibility that it is necessary to move along the riverbed. A stream of water escapes from the rock wall at a height of about 20 meters. In terms of its height, water consumption and power, the Big Shymbulak waterfall is comparable to the Medvezhy waterfall in the Turgen gorge. Heavy spring precipitation also helps to increase the power of the waterfall, compared with the summer or autumn period, it is not easy to get close to the waterfall, in a few seconds you get soaked to the skin, and all this thanks to water dust. But if you cross the river, then there is not a large observation deck on the hill, where it is relatively dry. Flowing down, the water dug a deep bath at the bottom of the gorge, up to 2 meters deep. The water in this reservoir is very cold even on the hottest day, as it has a glacial origin. Spruce forests in the gorge are absent throughout its entire length. In the lower belt grows apricot and shrubs, barberry, rose hips, and other Shrubs are very prickly. For multi-day hikes, this is a big minus — the lack of firewood. Shrub vegetation is present on the slopes up to the heights of 2200–2400 m of the confluence with the Maybulak river.

The height above sea level is 1340 meters. The nearest settlement is Kargaly village, 10 km away.

In the extreme Western part of the Trans-Ili Alatau mountains, which are part of the Northern Tian Shan mountain system, the ridge sharply degrades and its height decreases (Kastek gorges). Factory gorge is located 50 km West of Almaty. At the beginning of the gorge is the village of Fabrichny (Kargaly). In order to get to the waterfall you need to go through the village to the water supply zone and then start walking part of the trekking 8 km long

== Protection of objects and visit period ==
The object is not protected by anyone and the gorge is not included in the state national Park. The acoustic environment of the object has a favorable climate (silence, melodic sounds in nature). Recommended visiting periods: April–June; August–October. Viewing the waterfall is spectacular at any time of the day, including at night. Mobile communication is difficult. The territory of the monument has no tourist infrastructure, there is no system of tourist signs, food points, and observation platforms are not equipped.

== Sources of information about the monument ==
- A. P. Gorbunov Mountains Of Central Asia. Explanatory dictionary of geographical names and terms. Almaty, 2006
- T. Januzakov Essay on Kazakh onomastics, ed. «Science» — Almaty, 1982
- G. F. Ufimtsev Waterfalls. — «Earth and the universe», 2014 # 1
