= Alpine skiing at the 2011 Asian Winter Games – Women's downhill =

Women's downhill at the 2011 Asian Winter Games
- Venue: Shymbulak Alpine Resort
- Dates: 31 January 2011
- Competitors: 9 from 5 nations

Medalists
gold medal	Kim Sun-joo	South Korea
silver medal	Lyudmila Fedotova	Kazakhstan
bronze medal	Xeniya Stroilova	Kazakhstan

The women's downhill at the 2011 Asian Winter Games was held on January 31, 2011, at Shymbulak Alpine Sport Resort in Almaty, Kazakhstan.

== Schedule ==
All times are Almaty Time (UTC+06:00)

Date	Time	Event
Monday, 31 January 2011	13:05	Final

== Results ==
Legend

- DNF — Did not finish
- DNS — Did not start

Rank	Athlete	Time
1st place, gold medalist(s)	Kim Sun-joo (KOR)	1:37.61
2nd place, silver medalist(s)	Lyudmila Fedotova (KAZ)	1:37.87
3rd place, bronze medalist(s)	Xeniya Stroilova (KAZ)	1:39.60
4	Jung Hye-me (KOR)	1:40.34
5	Kseniya Grigoreva (UZB)	1:44.86
6	Marjan Kalhor (IRI)	1:46.64
7	Ziba Kalhor (IRI)	1:48.17
—	Svetlana Baranova (UZB)	DNF
—	Altanzulyn Ariunzayaa (MGL)	DNS
