= Singapore at the 2011 Asian Winter Games =

- IOC code: SIN
- NOC: Singapore National Olympic Council
- Website: www.singaporeolympics.com (in English)

in Astana and Almaty
- Competitors: 1 in 1 sport
- Flag bearer: Lucas Ng
- Medals: Gold 0 Silver 0 Bronze 0 Total 0

Asian Winter Games appearances
- 2011; 2017; 2025; 2029

Singapore participated in the 2011 Asian Winter Games in Almaty and Astana, Kazakhstan from January 30, 2011 to February 6, 2011. This marks Singapore's debut at a major winter sporting event. The nation sent only one athlete.

== Short track speed skating ==
Men

Athlete	Event	Heat		Semifinal		Final	
Athlete	Event	Time	Rank	Time	Rank	Time	Rank
Lucas Ng	500	50.124	3	Did not advance			
Lucas Ng	1000m	1:40.220	4	Did not advance			
