= Lyudmila Fedotova =

Kazakhstani alpine skier (born 1986)

Personal information
- Nationality: Kazakhstani
- Born: 23 April 1986 (age 39)
- Height: 179 cm (70 in)
- Weight: 77 kg (170 lb)

Sport
- Country: Kazakhstan
- Sport: Alpine skiing
- Event(s): downhill, super-G, combined

Achievements and titles
- Olympic finals: 2010 Winter Olympics: Downhill–36; Super-G–38

Lyudmila Fedotova
Medal record

Women's alpine skiing

Representing Kazakhstan

Asian Winter Games
Gold medal – first place	2011 Astana-Almaty	Combined
Silver medal – second place	2011 Astana-Almaty	Downhill
Silver medal – second place	2011 Astana-Almaty	Super-G

Lyudmila Fedotova (born 23 April 1986) is a female skier from Kazakhstan. She competed in the alpine skiing events in the 2010 Winter Olympics. She also competed in the FIS Alpine World Ski Championships 2009.

Fedotova competed in the women's downhill, super-G and giant slalom coming 36th and 38th in the first two, but failing to finish in the giant slalom.

Results

FIS Alpine World Ski Championships 2009:
Super-G–50
Giant Slalom–DNF
2010 Winter Olympics:
Downhill–36
Super-G–38
