= Kazakhstan at the 2011 Asian Winter Games =

- IOC code: KAZ
- NOC: National Olympic Committee of the Republic of Kazakhstan

in Astana and Almaty
- Competitors: 169 in 11 sports
- Medals Ranked 1st: Gold 32 Silver 21 Bronze 17 Total 70

Asian Winter Games appearances
- 1996; 1999; 2003; 2007; 2011; 2017; 2025; 2029

Kazakhstan was the host nation of the 2011 Asian Winter Games in Almaty and Astana from January 30, 2011 to February 6, 2011. Kazakhstan hosted the games for the first time.

== Alpine skiing ==
Men

Athlete	Event	Time	Rank
Dmitriy Koshkin	Downhill	1:27.52	2nd place, silver medalist(s)
Dmitriy Koshkin	Super-G	1:04.61	1st place, gold medalist(s)
Dmitriy Koshkin	Combined	DNF	
Igor Zakurdaev	Downhill	1:28.11	2nd place, silver medalist(s)
Igor Zakurdaev	Super-G	1:04.61	1st place, gold medalist(s)
Igor Zakurdaev	Combined	1:45.82	2nd place, silver medalist(s)

Women

Athlete	Event	Time	Rank
Lyudmila Fedotova	Downhill	1:37.87	2nd place, silver medalist(s)
Lyudmila Fedotova	Super-G	1:11.33	2nd place, silver medalist(s)
Lyudmila Fedotova	Combined	2:01.41	1st place, gold medalist(s)
Kseniya Stroilova	Downhill	1:39.60	3rd place, bronze medalist(s)
Kseniya Stroilova	Super-G	1:15.28	4
Kseniya Stroilova	Combined	2:04.27	3rd place, bronze medalist(s)

== Bandy ==
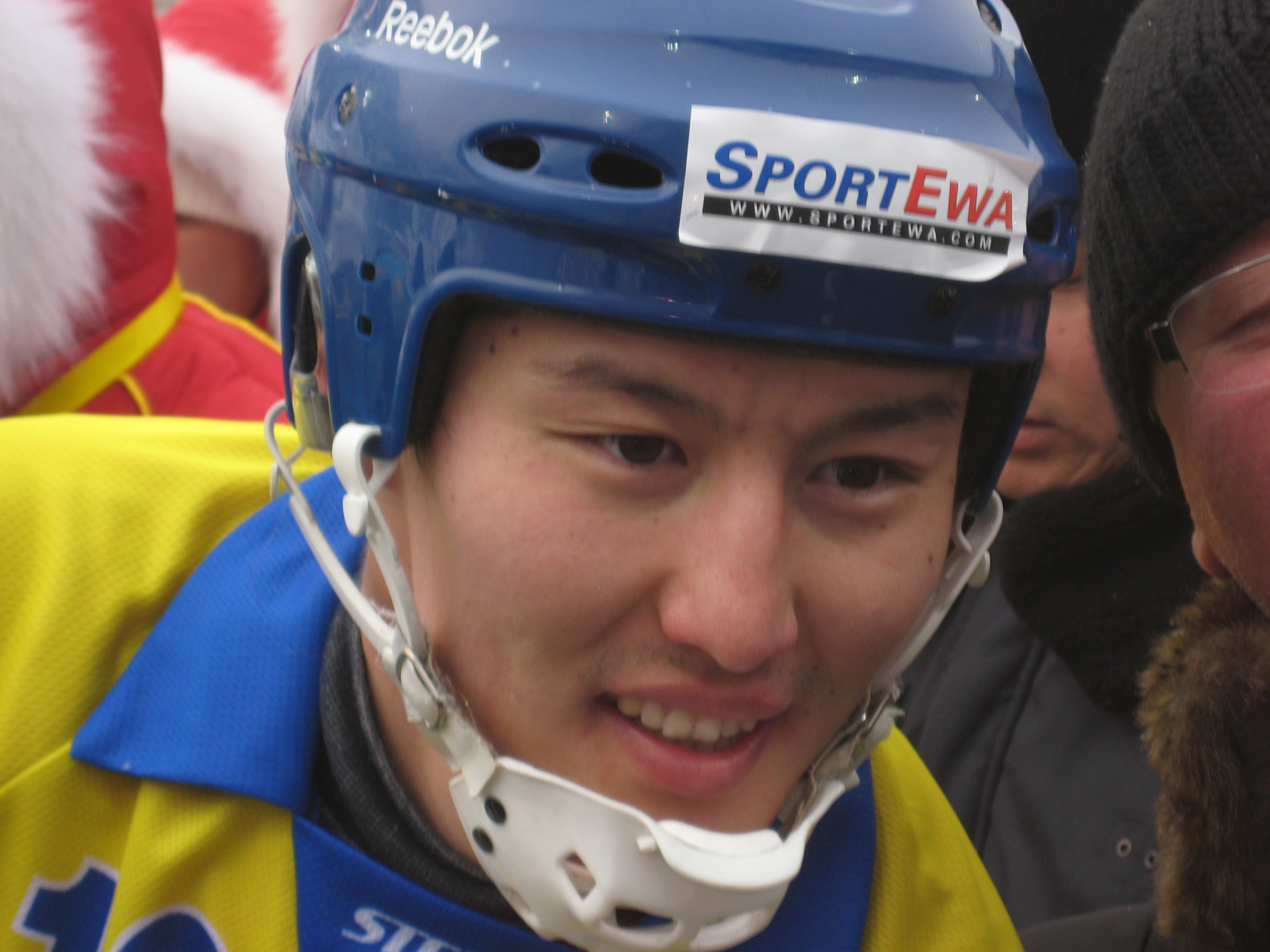
The best goalscorer of the tournament, Rauan Isaliyev

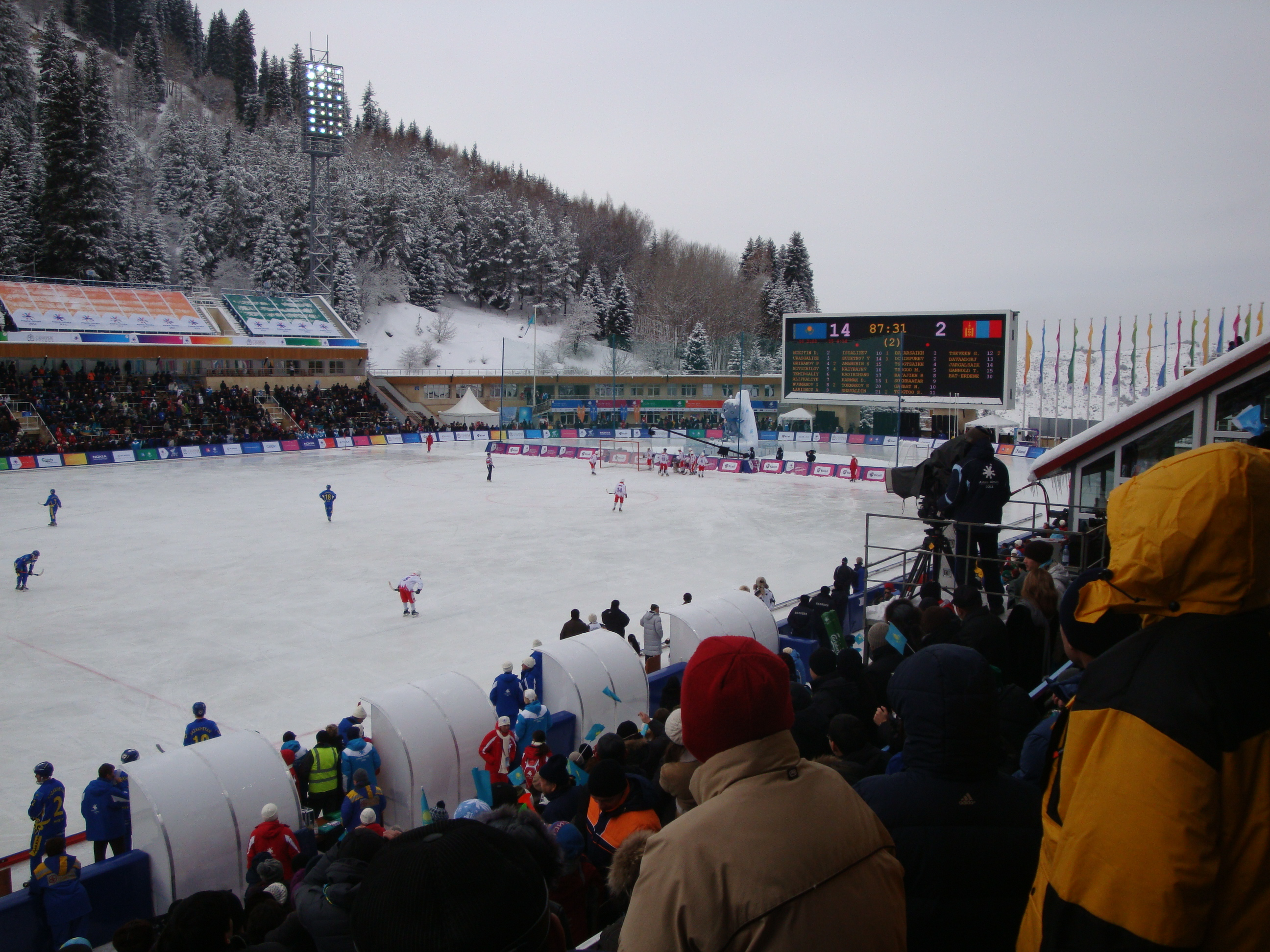
The final between Kazakhstan and Mongolia

Kazakhstan won gold in bandy.

Squad

- Team roster

- Dmitriy Nikitin
- Nurlan Urazgaliyev
- Pyotr Gribanov
- Vladislav Novozhilov
- Askar Temirgaliyev
- Yelaman Alipkaliyev
- Iskander Nugmanov
- Anton Larionov
- Rauan Issaliyev
- Vitaliy Suyetnov
- Samat Amanshin
- Arstan Kazybayev
- Sultan Kadirzhanov
- Dmitriy Karmak
- Sergey Tokmakov
- Nikolay Shavaldin
- Nariman Takirov
- Ilyas Khairekishev

Preliminaries All times are Almaty Time (UTC+06:00)

Team	Pld	W	D	L	GF	GA	GD	Pts
Kazakhstan	2	2	0	0	38	0	+38	6
Mongolia	2	1	0	1	17	19	−2	3
Kyrgyzstan	2	0	0	2	2	38	−36	0

2 February; 11:00	Kyrgyzstan	2–17 (0–13, 2–4)	Mongolia	Medeu, Almaty

Game reference

Elzar Bolotbekov
Goalies
Bayarsaikhany Mönkhbold
Bat-Erdeniin Chinzorig
Referee:
Sergey Gorbachev (RUS)

	0–1	01:01 – Negüün
	0–2	02:56 – Mungunkhuyag (Bayarsaikhan)
	0–3	03:39 – Bayarsaikhan
	0–4	06:02 – Myagmardorj (Bayarsaikhan)
	0–5	08:00 – Myagmardorj
	0–6	10:17 – Bayarsaikhan (Mungunkhuyag)
	0–7	12:06 – Bayarsaikhan
	0–8	17:03 – Negüün
	0–9	23:22 – Shinebayar
	0–10	24:09 – Negüün
	0–11	34:33 – Mungunkhuyag (Shinebayar)
	0–12	37:55 – Bayarsaikhan
	0–13	41:57 – Negüün
Tynymseitov (Zhumataev) – 52:30	1–13
	1–14	53:26 – Bayarsaikhan
	1–15	56:44 – Shinebayar (Bayarsaikhan)
	1–16	63:22 – Shinebayar
	1–17	72:27 – Negüün
Tynymseitov (Zhumataev) – 87:00	2–17

0 min
Penalties
0 min
16
Shots
46

3 February; 11:00	Kazakhstan	21–0 (9–0, 10–0, 2–0)	Kyrgyzstan	Medeu, Almaty

Game reference

Nariman Takirov
Ilyas Khairekishev
Goalies
Elzar Bolotbekov
Referee:
Vyacheslav Kurbanov (RUS)

Issaliyev (Novozhilov) – 00:57	1–0
Nugmanov (Issaliyev) – 03:30	2–0
Issaliyev – 05:18	3–0
Nugmanov – 13:47	4–0
Issaliyev – 14:21	5–0
Larionov – 16:19	6–0
Alipkaliyev – 17:47	7–0
Alipkaliyev – 24:27	8–0
Issaliyev – 25:14	9–0
Issaliyev – 31:32	10–0
Nugmanov – 32:31	11–0
Nugmanov – 33:52	12–0
Tokmakov – 34:46	13–0
Issaliyev – 42:17	14–0
Gribanov – 43:33	15–0
Larionov – 45:59	16–0
Issaliyev – 46:43	17–0
Nugmanov – 47:23	18–0
Alipkaliyev – 48:40	19–0
Kadirzhanov (Issaliyev) – 70:49	20–0
Issaliyev – 89:38	21–0

0 min
Penalties
0 min
66
Shots
0

4 February; 11:00	Mongolia	0–17 (0–9, 0–8)	Kazakhstan	Medeu, Almaty

Game reference

Bayarsaikhany Mönkhbold
Goalies
Ilyas Khairekishev
Referee:
Vyacheslav Kurbanov (RUS)

0–1	04:27 – Issaliyev (Shavaldin)
0–2	06:48 – Nugmanov
0–3	10:13 – Issaliyev (Gribanov)
0–4	14:59 – Temirgaliyev
0–5	21:49 – Issaliyev (Gribanov)
0–6	27:51 – Nugmanov (Issaliyev)
0–7	29:10 – Issaliyev
0–8	36:34 – Issaliyev
0–9	40:15 – Novozhilov (Shavaldin)
0–10	48:22 – Nugmanov
0–11	49:59 – Issaliyev
0–12	58:17 – Nugmanov
0–13	65:43 – Issaliyev
0–14	72:33 – Issaliyev
0–15	76:14 – Issaliyev (Amanshin)
0–16	78:44 – Kazybayev
0–17	+92:01 – Issaliyev

20 min
Penalties
40 min
5
Shots
52

Final

6 February; 11:00	Kazakhstan	16–2 (7–0, 9–2)	Mongolia	Medeu, Almaty

http://info.astana-almaty2011.kz/en/Root.mvc/ViewPdf/BAM400101_C73_1.0.PDF

Ilyas Khairekishev
Goalies
Bayarsaikhany Mönkhbold
Referee:
Sergey Gorbachev (RUS)

Issaliyev (Nugmanov) – 01:56	1–0
Shavaldin – 04:42	2–0
Novozhilov (Shavaldin) – 07:49	3–0
Issaliyev – 11:18	4–0
Issaliyev (Temirgaliyev) – 19:38	5–0
Shavaldin (Issaliyev) – 21:27	6–0
Gribanov – +49:37	7–0
Novozhilov (Nugmanov) – 45:41	8–0
Nugmanov (Issaliyev) – 48:56	9–0
	9–1	57:12 – Gan-Ochir
Suyetnov (Issaliyev) – 61:19	10–1
Novozhilov (Issaliyev) – 62:59	11–1
Novozhilov – 68:16	12–1
Gribanov – 71:42	13–1
	13–2	74:39 – Gan-Ochir
Nugmanov – 83:56	14–2
Issaliyev (Karmak) – 89:13	15–2
Issaliyev (Shavaldin) – +90:18	16–2

90 min
Penalties
95 min
50
Shots
9

== Biathlon ==
Kazakhstan will send a team of 21 athletes. The team includes Olympic silver medalist Elena Khrustaleva.

Men

- Alexsandr Chervyhkov
- Yan Savitskiy
- Alexandr Trifonov
- Dias Keneshev
- Nikolay Braichenko
- Sergey Naumik

Women

- Viktoriya Afanasyeva
- Elena Khrustaleva
- Anna Lebedeva
- Irina Mozhevitina
- Galina Okolzdayeva
- Marina Lebedeva
- Olga Poltoranina

== Cross country skiing ==
Kazakhstan will send a team of 20 athletes.

Men

- Alexey Poltaranin
- Nikolay Chebotko
- Sergey Cherepanov
- Yevgeniy Velichko
- Eugene Koshevoi
- Gennady Matviyenko
- Yerdos Akhmadiyev
- Mark Starostin
- Denis Volotko
- Andrey Golovko

Women

- Svetlana Malahova-Shishkina
- Elena Kolomina
- Tatjana Roshina
- Oxana Jatskaja
- Marina Matrossova
- Anastasiya Slonova
- Yelena Sakhnova
- Yekaterina Semenovikh
- Yelena Antonova
- Tatyana Shchedenko

== Freestyle skiing ==
Kazakhstan will send a team of 12 athletes.

Men

- Dmitry Reiherd - Moguls
- Dmitriy Barmashov - Moguls
- Andrey Sokolov - Moguls
- Ruslan Ablyatifov - Aerials
- Yuriy Khokhlov - Aerials
- Sergey Berestovskiy - Aerials

Women

- Darya Rybalova - Moguls
- Yulia Galysheva - Moguls
- Yuliya Rodionova - Moguls
- Gul'mira Dal'mukhan - Aerials
- Zhibek Arapbayeva - Aerials
- Akmarzhan Kalmurzaeva - Aerials

== Figure skating ==
Kazakhstan will send a team of 8 figure skaters.

Men

Athlete(s)	Event	SP/SP		LP/LP		Total	
Athlete(s)	Event	Points	Rank	Points	Rank	Points	Rank
Denis Ten	Men's	76.22	1	132.67	1	208.89	1st place, gold medalist(s)
Abzal Rakimgaliev	Men's	56.43	7	114.38	7	170.81	7

Women

Athlete(s)	Event	SP/SP		FS/LP		Total	
Athlete(s)	Event	Points	Rank	Points	Rank	Points	Rank
Kristina Prilepko	Women's	36.23	8	72.36	8	108.59	8
Marina Shishkina	Women's	25.61	14	59.06	14	84.67	14
Malyuk Yekaterina	Women's						

Pairs

Athlete(s)	Event	SP/OD		FS/FD		Total	
Athlete(s)	Event	Points	Rank	Points	Rank	Points	Rank
Vladimir Rudi & Lidiya Voblenko	Pairs	—	—	—	—	—	DNS

Ice dance

Athlete(s)	Event	SP/OD		FS/FD		Total	
Athlete(s)	Event	Points	Rank	Points	Rank	Points	Rank
Victor Adonyev & Viktoriya Kucherenko	Ice dancing	36.22	4	66.52	4	102.74	4

== Ice hockey ==
Men

The men's team is in the top division for these games.

Roster

- Vitaliy Yeremeyev
- Vitaly Kolesnik
- Alexei Kuznetsov
- Roman Savchenko
- Alexei Vassilchenko
- Yevgeny Fadeev
- Vitaly Novopashin
- Alexei Litvinenko
- Maxim Semenov
- Alexei Koledayev
- Evgeny Blokhin
- Evgeni Bumagin
- Andrei Gavrilin
- Vadim Krasnoslobodtsev
- Evgeny Rymarev
- Roman Starchenko
- Talgat Zhailauov
- Fedor Polischuk
- Maxim Khudyakov
- Maksim Belyayev
- Dmitry Upper
- Dmitri Dudarev
- Ivan Poloshkov

Group A

Team	GP	W	OTW	OTL	L	GF	GA	DIF	PTS
Kazakhstan	4	4	0	0	0	62	3	+59	12
Japan	4	3	0	0	1	32	6	+26	9
South Korea	4	2	0	0	2	35	16	+19	6
China	4	1	0	0	3	13	33	−20	3
Chinese Taipei	4	0	0	0	4	1	85	−84	0

All times are local (UTC+6).

February 1, 2011; 19:00	Kazakhstan	14-1	China	Kazakhstan Sports Palace (Arena 1)

February 3, 2011; 19:00	Kazakhstan	35-0	Chinese Taipei	Kazakhstan Sports Palace (Arena 1)

February 4, 2011; 19:00	South Korea	1-9	Kazakhstan	Kazakhstan Sports Palace (Arena 1)

February 6, 2011; 16:00	Kazakhstan	4-1	Japan	Kazakhstan Sports Palace (Arena 1)

Women
Roster

- Ayzhan Raushanova
- Dar'ya Obydennova
- Anna Kosenko
- Natal'ya Trunova
- Viktoriya Sazonova
- Galina Shu
- Ol'ga Konysheva
- Yelena Shtel'mayster
- Viktoriya Musataeva
- Al'bina Suprun
- Anastasiya Orlova
- Natal'ya Yakovchuk
- Larisa Sviridova
- Alena Fuks
- Lyubov Ibragimova
- Zarina Tukhtieva
- Ol'ga Potapova
- Ol'ga Kryukova
- Aleksandra Ashikhina
- Mariya Topkaeva
- Galiya Nurgalieva
- Tat'yana Koroleva

=== Group A ===
Team	GP	W	OTW	OTL	L	GF	GA	DIF	PTS
Kazakhstan	4	3	1	0	0	21	3	+18	11
Japan	4	2	1	1	0	22	6	+16	9
China	4	2	0	1	1	22	9	+13	7
North Korea	4	1	0	0	3	7	18	−11	3
South Korea	4	0	0	0	4	1	37	−36	0

All times are local (UTC+6).

January 28, 2011; 19:00	North Korea	0 - 3	Kazakhstan	Baluan Sholak Palace of Culture and Sports

January 29, 2011; 19:00	Kazakhstan	11 - 0	South Korea	Baluan Sholak Palace of Culture and Sports

January 31, 2011; 19:00	Kazakhstan	3-2 PS	Japan	Baluan Sholak Palace of Culture and Sports

February 3, 2011; 16:00	China	1 - 4	Kazakhstan	Baluan Sholak Palace of Culture and Sports

== Ski jumping ==
Kazakhstan will send a team of 5 athletes.

Men

- Nikolay Karpenko
- Alex Korolev
- Evgeni Levkin
- Radik Zhaparov
- Konstantin Sokolenko

== Ski orienteering ==
Kazakhstan will send a team of 12 athletes.

Men

- Aleksandr Babenko
- Aleksey Nemtsev
- Vitaliy Lilichenko
- Mikhail Sorokin
- Denis Vlasov
- Aslan Tokbaev

Women

- Yevgeniya Kuzmina
- Tat'yana Mikhaylova
- Ol'ga Novikova
- Elmira Moldasheva
- Mariya Vlasova
- Meruert Imasheva

== Speed skating ==
Kazakhstan will send a team of 18 speed skaters.

Men

- Dmitry Babenko
- Denis Kuzin
- Aleksandr Zhigin
- Artem Belousov
- Romman Krech
- Aleksey Bondarchuk
- Viktor Glushenko
- Aleksandr Glushchenko
- Maksim Baklashkin

Women

- Yekaterina Aydova
- Tat'yana Sokirko
- Ol'ga Zhigana
- Viktoriya Lugovaya
- Yuliya Gonchar
- Irina Shumikhina
- Yelena Urvantseva
- Yevgeniya Safina
- Natal'ya Rybakova

== Short track speed skating ==
Kazakhstan will send a full team of 10 athletes.

Men

- Aidar Bekzhanov
- Artur Sultangaliev
- Nurbergen Zhumagaziev
- Abzal Azhgaliev
- Fedor Andreev

Women

- Inna Simonova
- Kseniya Motova
- Dar'ya Volokitina
- Anna Samarina
- Anastasiya Kuznetsova

== See also ==
- Kazakhstan at the 2010 Winter Olympics
