= Jung Dong-hyun =

South Korean alpine skier (born 1988)

Personal information
- Native name: 정동현
- Born: 1 June 1988 (age 38) Ganseong, Goseong County, Gangwon, Republic of Korea
- Height: 178 cm (5 ft 10 in) (2025)
- Weight: 82 kg (181 lb) (2025)

Skiing career
- Country: South Korea
- Sport: Alpine skiing
- Disciplines: Giant slalom, slalom
- World Cup debut: 5 December 2010 (age 22)

Olympics
- Teams: 5 – (2010–2026)
- Medals: 0

World Championships
- Teams: 1 – (2015)
- Medals: 0

World Cup
- Seasons: 15 – (2011–2015, 2017–2026)
- Podiums: 0
- Overall titles: 0 – (114th in 2017)
- Discipline titles: 0 – (41st in SL, 2017)
Medal record
Men's alpine skiing
Representing South Korea
Asian Games
Gold medal – first place	2011 Astana-Almaty	Combined
Gold medal – first place	2017 Sapporo	Slalom
Silver medal – second place	2025 Harbin	Slalom
Bronze medal – third place	2011 Astana-Almaty	Downhill

Jung Dong-hyun (Korean: 정동현, born 1 June 1988) is an alpine skier from South Korea. He competed for South Korea at the 2010 Winter Olympics where he failed to finish the first run of the slalom. He has qualified seven times to a World Cup second run in slalom, best result being 14th in Zagreb in 2017.

== World Cup results ==
=== Season standings ===
Season
Season	Age	Overall	Slalom	Giant slalom	Super-G	Downhill	Combined	Parallel
2017	28	114	41	—	—	—	—	—N/a
2018	29	151	55	—	—	—	—	—N/a
2019	30	133	49	—	—	—	—	—N/a
2020	31	143	53	—	—	—	—	—

=== Top twenty finishes ===
- 0 podiums, 2 top twenties

Season
Season	Date	Location	Discipline	Place
2017	5 Jan 2017	Zagreb, Croatia	Slalom	14th
2019	20 Jan 2019	Wengen, Switzerland	Slalom	20th

== World Championship results ==
Year
Year	Age	Slalom	Giant slalom	Super-G	Downhill	Combined	Team event
2015	26	25	40	—	—	—	—

== Olympic results ==
Year
Year	Age	Slalom	Giant slalom	Super-G	Downhill	Combined	Team combined	Team event
2010	21	DNF1	DNF1	—	—	—	—N/a	—N/a
2014	25	DNF1	41	—	—	—	—N/a	—N/a
2018	29	27	DNF1	—	—	—	—N/a	9
2022	33	21	DNF1	—	—	—	—N/a	—
2026	37	—	33	—	—	—N/a	—	—N/a
