= Mohammad Kiyadarbandsari =

Iranian alpine skier (born 1989)

Personal information
- Born: 9 October 1989 (age 36) Tehran, Iran
- Height: 178 cm (5 ft 10 in) (2025)
- Weight: 75 kg (165 lb) (2025)

Skiing career
- Country: Iran
- Sport: Alpine skiing
- Disciplines: Giant slalom, slalom

Olympics
- Teams: 3 – (2014–2018, 2026)
- Medals: 0

World Championships
- Teams: 3 – (2011–2013, 2023)
- Medals: 0
Medal record
Men's alpine skiing
Representing Iran
Asian Winter Games
Bronze medal – third place	2011 Astana-Almaty	Super-G

Mohammad Kiyadarbandsari (Persian: محمد كیادربندسری, born 9 October 1989) is an Iranian alpine skier. He won the first ever Asian Winter Games medal for Iran at 2011 Asian Winter Games. He competed for Iran at the 2014 Winter Olympics, 2017 Asian Winter Games, 2018 Winter Olympics, 2025 Asian Winter Games, and 2026 Winter Olympics.

== World Championship results ==
Year
Year	Age	Slalom	Giant slalom	Super-G	Downhill	Combined	Parallel	Team event
2011	21	DNFQ2	75	—	—	—	—N/a	—
2013	23	DNF1	48	—	—	—	—N/a	—
2023	33	52	47	—	—	—	—	—

== Olympic results ==
Year
Year	Age	Slalom	Giant slalom	Super-G	Downhill	Combined	Team combined	Team event
2014	24	30	51	—	—	—	—N/a	—N/a
2018	28	34	58	—	—	—	—N/a	—
2026	33	—	61	—	—	—N/a	—	—N/a
