= Igor Zakurdayev =

Kazakhstani alpine skier (born 1987)

Medal record

Men's alpine skiing

Representing Kazakhstan

Asian Games
Gold medal – first place	2011 Astana-Almaty	Combined
Gold medal – first place	2011 Astana-Almaty	Super-G
Silver medal – second place	2011 Astana-Almaty	Downhill

Igor Valeryevich Zakurdayev (born January 26, 1987) is a skier who competed in Alpine Skiing in Vancouver 2010 and Sochi 2014. He was born in Ridder, Kazakhstan.
