= Kim Sun-joo =

South Korean alpine skier (born 1985)

Medal record

Women's alpine skiing

Representing South Korea

Asian Games
Gold medal – first place	2011 Astana-Almaty	Downhill
Gold medal – first place	2011 Astana-Almaty	Super-G

Kim Sun-joo (born November 13, 1985) is an alpine skier from South Korea. She competed for South Korea at the 2010 Winter Olympics. Her best result was a 46th place in the slalom.
