= Kim Woo-sung (alpine skier) =

South Korean alpine skier (born 1986)

Medal record

Men's alpine skiing

Representing South Korea

Asian Games
Bronze medal – third place	2007 Changchun	Giant slalom
Bronze medal – third place	2011 Astana-Almaty	Combined

Kim Woo-sung (born April 2, 1986) is an alpine skier from South Korea. He has competed for South Korea at the 2006 Olympics and the 2010 Olympics.
