= Dmitriy Koshkin =

Kazakhstani alpine skier (born 1986)

Personal information
- Born: 20 April 1986 (age 40) Novosibirsk, Russia
- Height: 1.80 m (5 ft 11 in) (5' 11'')
- Weight: 80 kg / 176 lb
Medal record
Alpine skiing
Representing Kazakhstan
Asian Games
Gold medal – first place	2011 Astana-Almaty	Downhill
Silver medal – second place	2011 Astana-Almaty	Super-G

Dmitriy Aleksandrovich Koshkin (Russian: Дми́трий Алекса́ндрович Ко́шкин; born 20 April 1986 in Novosibirsk, Russia) is an alpine skier competing for Kazakhstan. He competed for Kazakhstan at the 2014 Winter Olympics in the alpine skiing events. He previously competed for his native Russia.
