= Kyrgyzstan at the 2011 Asian Winter Games =

- IOC code: KGZ
- NOC: National Olympic Committee of the Republic of Kyrgyzstan

in Astana and Almaty
- Competitors: 52 in 5 sports
- Medals Ranked 7th: Gold 0 Silver 0 Bronze 1 Total 1

Asian Winter Games appearances
- 1996; 1999; 2003; 2007; 2011; 2017; 2025; 2029

Kyrgyzstan participated in the 2011 Asian Winter Games in Almaty and Astana, Kazakhstan from January 30, 2011 to February 6, 2011. The bandy team took the country's first medal at Asian Winter Games.

== Alpine skiing ==
Kyrgyzstan sent two alpine skiers.

Men

- Alexander Trelevski
- Dmitry Trelevski

== Bandy ==
Kyrgyzstan sent a bandy team.

== Results ==
=== Group A ===
Team	GP	W	OTL	L	BP	BC	DIF	PTS
Kazakhstan	2	2	0	0	38	0	+38	6
Mongolia	2	1	0	1	17	19	−2	3
Kyrgyzstan	2	0	0	2	2	38	−36	0

All times are local (UTC+6).

February 2, 2011; 12:30	Kyrgyzstan	v	Mongolia	Medeo

February 3, 2011; 12:30	Kazakhstan	v	Kyrgyzstan	Medeo

== Biathlon ==
Kyrgyzstan will send a biathlon team of 2 athletes.

Men

- Azamat Bozhokoev
- Zafar Shakhmuratov

== Figure skating ==
Karina Uraimova was scheduled to represent Kyrgyzstan, but had to withdraw, because she had accreditation for only one year, and the requirement was two years.

== Ice hockey ==
Men

The team is in the premier division for these games.

=== Premier Division ===
Team	GP	W	OTW	OTL	L	GF	GA	DIF	PTS
United Arab Emirates	0	0	0	0	0	0	0	0	0
Thailand	0	0	0	0	0	0	0	0	0
Malaysia	0	0	0	0	0	0	0	0	0
Mongolia	0	0	0	0	0	0	0	0	0
Kuwait	0	0	0	0	0	0	0	0	0
Kyrgyzstan	0	0	0	0	0	0	0	0	0
Bahrain	0	0	0	0	0	0	0	0	0

All times are local (UTC+6).

January 28, 2011; 13:30	Thailand	v	Kyrgyzstan	Kazakhstan Sports Palace (Arena 2)

January 29, 2011; 13:30	United Arab Emirates	v	Kyrgyzstan	Kazakhstan Sports Palace (Arena 2)

January 31, 2011; 17:00	Mongolia	v	Kyrgyzstan	Kazakhstan Sports Palace (Arena 2)

February 1, 2011; 13:30	Kyrgyzstan	v	Malaysia	Kazakhstan Sports Palace (Arena 2)

February 2, 2011; 13:30	Bahrain	v	Kyrgyzstan	Kazakhstan Sports Palace (Arena 2)

February 4, 2011; 13:30	Kyrgyzstan	v	Kuwait	Kazakhstan Sports Palace (Arena 2)

Roster

- Sergei Osintsev
- Cyril Kudayarov
- Sergey Sorokin
- Sorokin Vladimir
- Artem Kolobov
- Denis Falfudinov
- Igor Kryukov
- Azmat Shiderinov
- Igor Kryukov
- Filippov Ivan
- Ageev Dmitry
- Yuri Zhuravlyov
- Dmitry Kabanov
- Pavel Sazonov
- Ramis Toktaliev
- Anvarbek Omorkanov
- Paul Fitisenko
- Jyrgalbek Bakirov
- Salamat Tynaliev
- Urmat Sheishenaly
- Turdaliev Askarbek
- Amanbek Esen Uulu
- Andrew Musin
- Ismailov Adil

== Ski orienteering ==
Kyrgyzstan will send a ski orienteering team.

Men

- Tamerlan Dzhumabekov
- Igor Gusev
- Andrei Savinykh
- Ruslan Kalpana

Women

- Evgeniia Chernobaeva
- Olga Gorozhanina
- Elena Rybalova
- Anastasia Yusupov
