= Lebanon at the 2011 Asian Winter Games =

- IOC code: LIB
- NOC: Lebanese Olympic Committee

in Astana and Almaty
- Competitors: 2 in 1 sport
- Flag bearer: No Flagbearer
- Medals: Gold 0 Silver 0 Bronze 0 Total 0

Asian Winter Games appearances
- 1996; 1999; 2003; 2007; 2011; 2017; 2025; 2029

Lebanon participated in the 2011 Asian Winter Games in Almaty and Astana, Kazakhstan from January 30, 2011 to February 6, 2011.

== Alpine skiing ==
Men

- Tarek Fenianos
- Philippe Araman
