= Palestine at the 2011 Asian Winter Games =

- IOC code: PLE
- NOC: Palestine Olympic Committee

in Astana and Almaty
- Competitors: 2 in 1 sport
- Flag bearer: Mohammed El Batta
- Medals: Gold 0 Silver 0 Bronze 0 Total 0

Asian Winter Games appearances
- 2003; 2007; 2011; 2017; 2025; 2029

Palestine participated in the 2011 Asian Winter Games in Almaty and Astana, Kazakhstan from January 30, 2011, to February 6, 2011.

== Alpine skiing ==
Palestine will send 2 alpine skiers.

Men

Athlete	Event	Final	
Athlete	Event	Time	Rank
Mohammed El Batta	Super-G	Did not start	
Mohammed El Batta	Super Combined	Did not start	

Women

Athlete	Event	Final	
Athlete	Event	Time	Rank
Arwa El Batta	Super-G	Did not finish	
Arwa El Batta	Super Combined	Did not start	
