= Shymbulak =

Ski resort near Almaty, Kazakhstan

Shymbulak Ski Resort
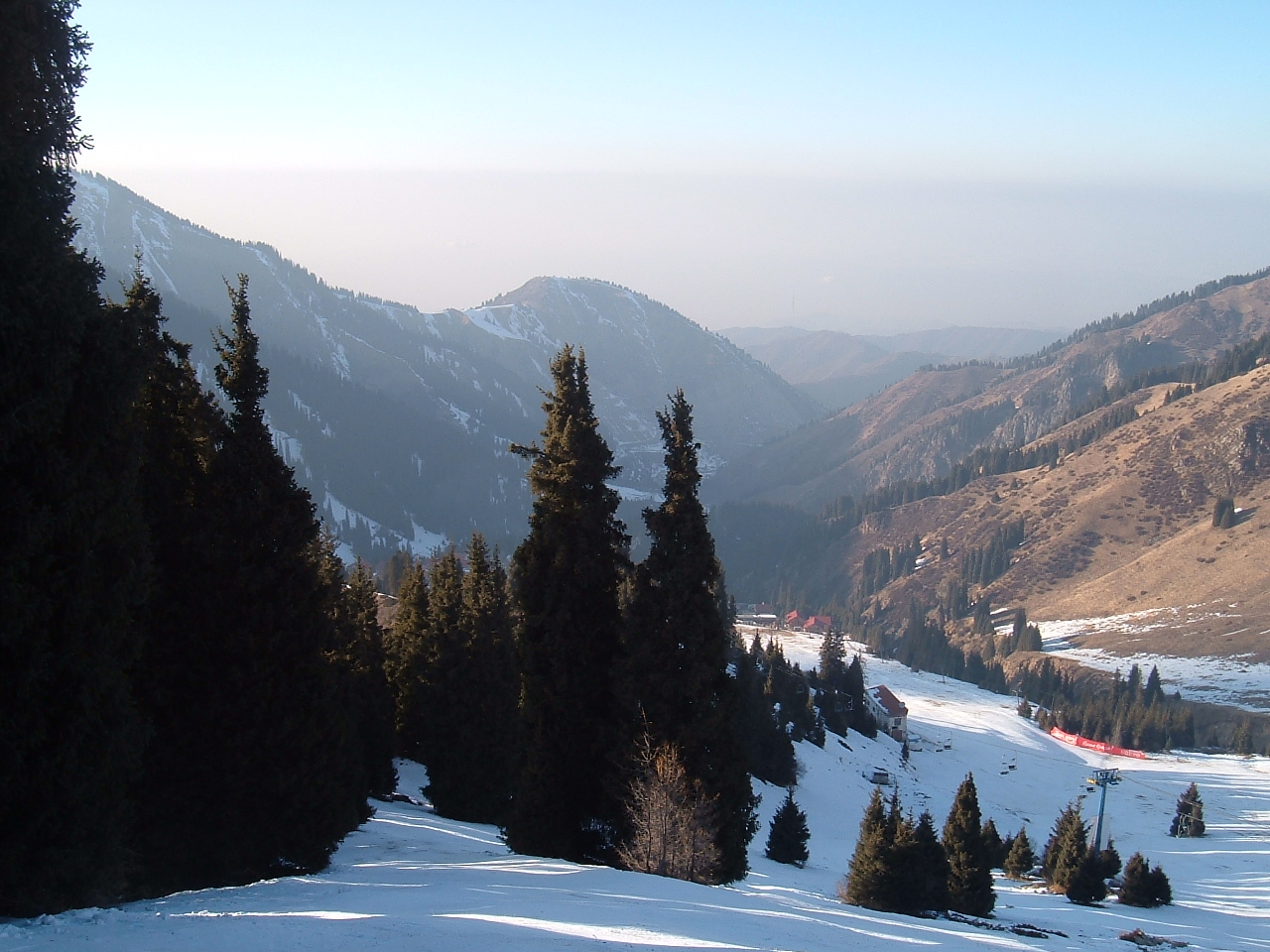
- Shymbulak Ski Area
- Interactive map of Shymbulak Ski Resort
- Location: Kazakhstan
- Nearest city: Almaty
- Coordinates: 43°7′41″N 77°4′51″E
- Vertical: 1,000 metres (3,300 ft)
- Top elevation: 3,200 metres (10,500 ft)
- Base elevation: 2,200 metres (7,200 ft)
- Website: http://www.shymbulak.com/en/

Shymbulak (Kazakh: Шымбұлақ, romanized: Şymbūlaq, pronounced [ʃɯmbʊɫɑ́q]), also known as Chimbulak (Russian: Чимбулак) and Chymbulak (Kyrgyz: Чымбулак), is a ski resort near Almaty, Kazakhstan. It is the largest ski resort in Central Asia. It is located in the upper part of the Medeu Valley in the Zailiisky Alatau mountain range, at an elevation of 2,200 metres (7,200 ft) above sea level. The resort area is about 25 kilometres (16 mi) south of Almaty city centre in the Medeo district.

== History ==
Shymbulak (also known as "Chimbulak") was discovered by amateur skiers in the 1940s. Soon after, it became the first downhill route in the Soviet Union. Skiers originally needed to climb up the mountain tops on foot (which took roughly 3 hours). In 1954 a 1,500 meters ski tow was built.

Starting from 1961, Shymbulak hosted several USSR Championships and the Silver Edelweisse prize skiing competitions.

In 1983 it became the Olympic ski training center for the USSR. During this time, various commodities were built including restaurants and hotels.

In 1985, after a thorough study of the conditions for competitions at Shymbulak, the International Ski Federation (FIS) approved three local tracks: Shymbulak-Talgar for downhill, Shymbulak for slalom and giant slalom.

In 1995 the school of alpine skiing and snowboarding "Shymbulak" was opened. The school is a member of the International Ski Instructors Association (ISIA).

The competition is held in February. Almaty hosted the 2011 Asian Winter Games, bid for 2014 Winter Olympics, considered a bid for 2018 Winter Olympics, but decided to bid for 2022 Winter Olympics instead; Shymbulak was a venue for the alpine skiing events (both speed and technical), and would have been for the latter.

== Ski area information ==
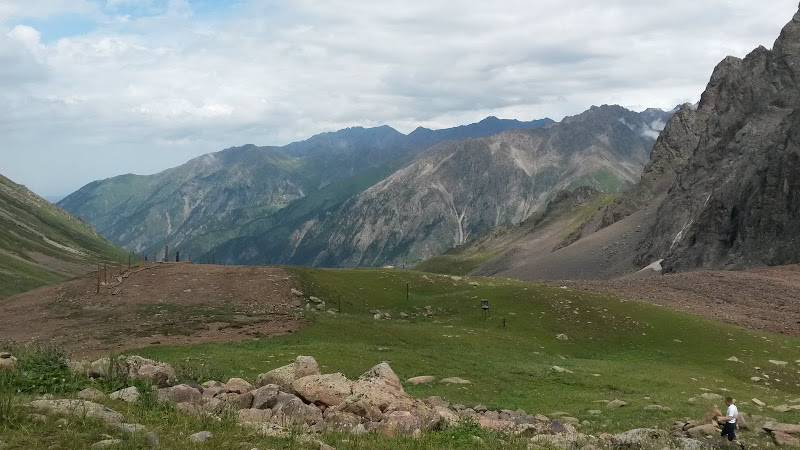
Shymbulak in summer.

The Shymbylak ski resort is located in the upper part of the Medeu Valley in the Zaiilisky Alatau mountain range, 25 km from Almaty. The resort can be reach by Gondola cars from Medeu.

The weather varies from 20 °C (68 °F) in summer to −7 °C (19 °F) in winter and the snow base is about 1.5 to 1.8 metres (60–70 in).The average snowfall is around 1.5 m. The duration of the ski season is from November to April.

The ski areas span over 3000 ft of vertical drop (920m) and nearly 7.5 miles (12 km) of ski runs. There are three ski lifts at the resort with the highest going to 3200 meters above sea level. At that level there is also a hotel located at the Resort.

There are three ski lifts, which cumulatively reach Talgar pass (3,200 metres [10,500 ft] above the sea level), the highest point of the ski resort. The total length of the lifts is 3,620 metres (11,880 ft). There are 3 stations of them; the first one is Intersection Station (2,260 metres [7,410 ft] above the sea level) (9 minute trip), then 20th Prop Station (2,630 metres [8,630 ft] above the sea level) (16.5 minutes) and Talgar pass Station (3,200 metres [10,500 ft] above the sea level). There is also Snow-Park for snowboarding.

In November 2021, the Shymbulak Ski Resort held an opening ceremony for a night skiing course on the Talgar Pass.

== Gallery ==
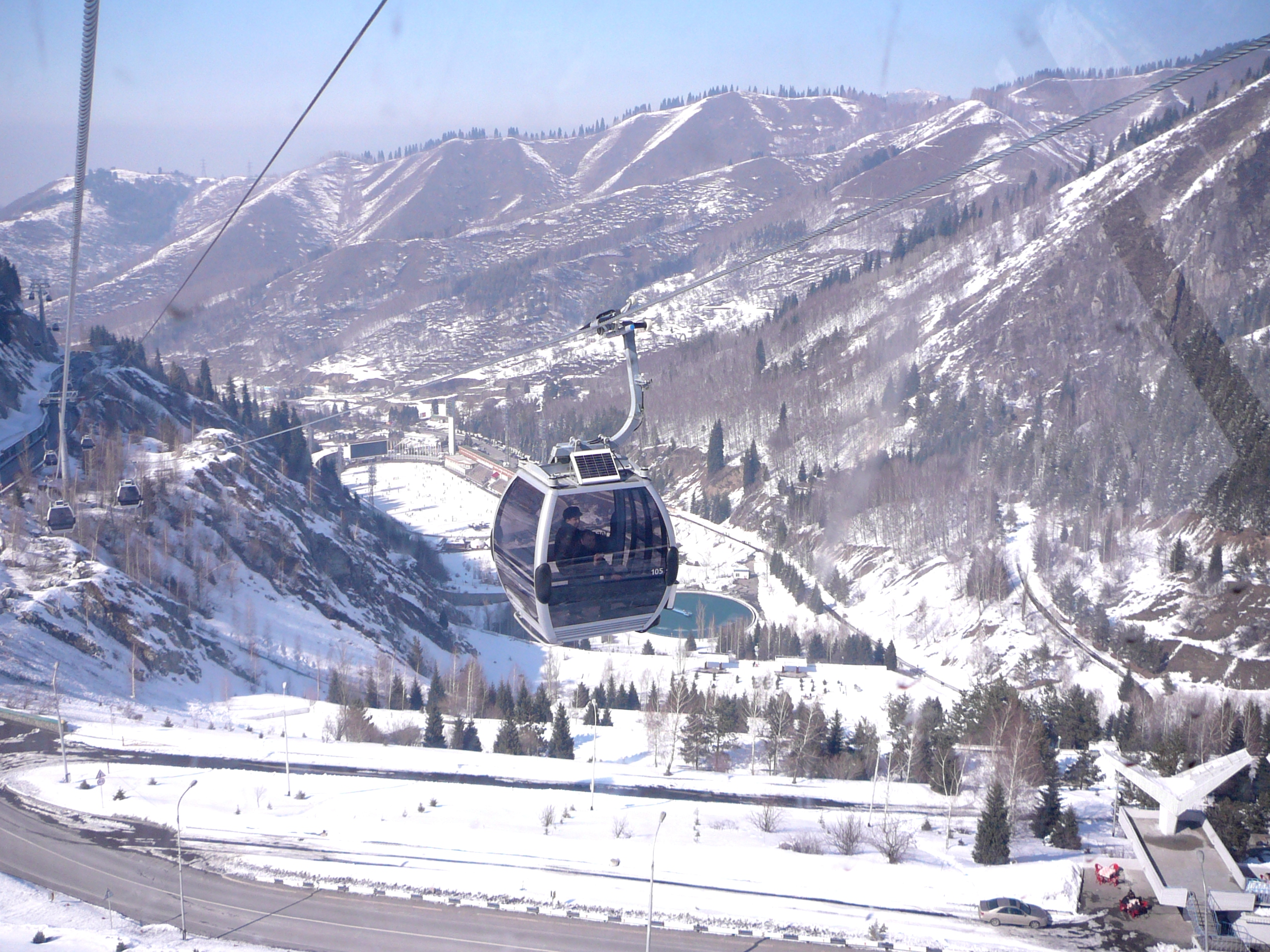
The new Medeu-Shymbulak gondola line. 8-passenger cabin

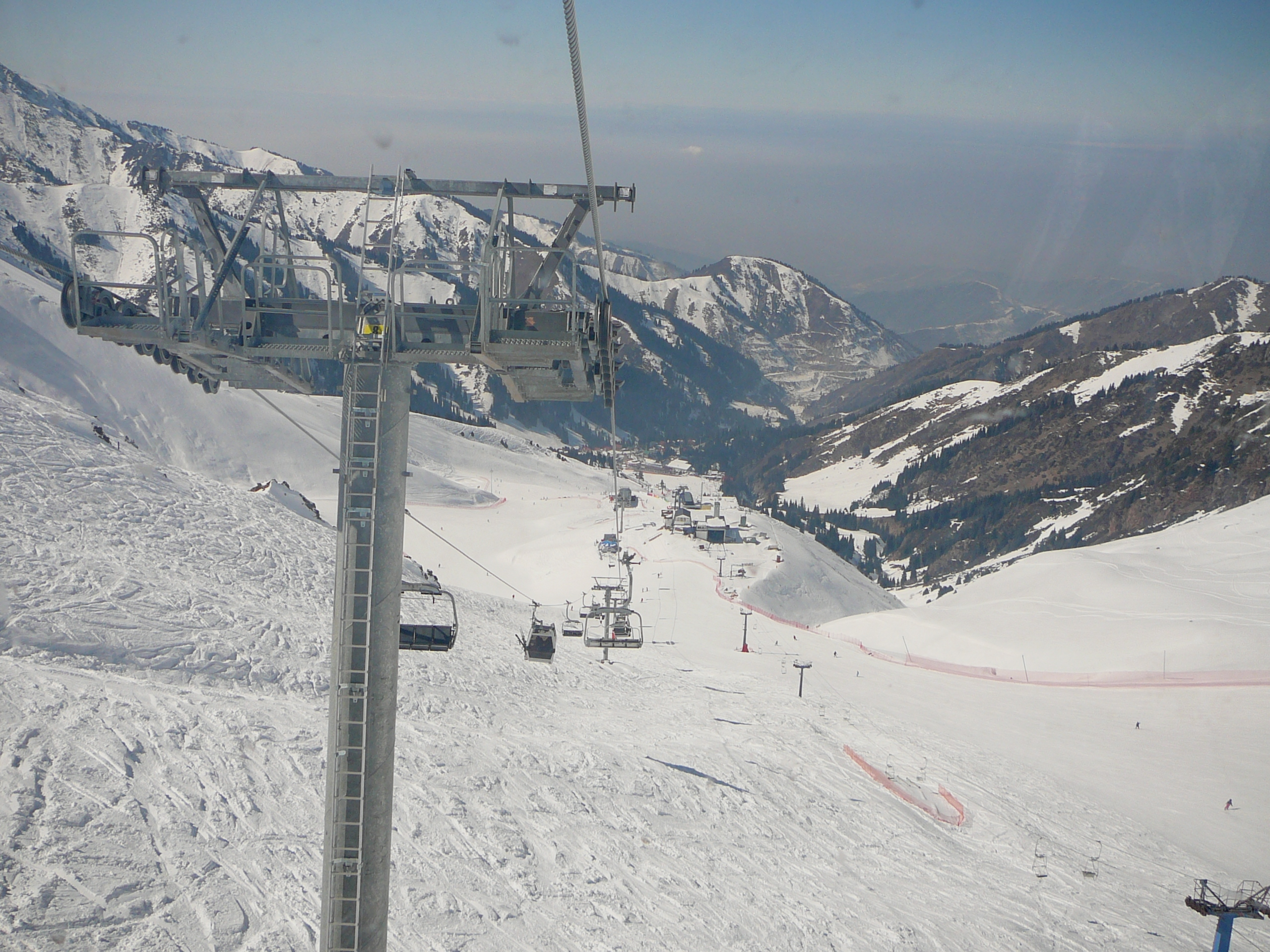
View from the cabin on the Shymbulak resort ski track

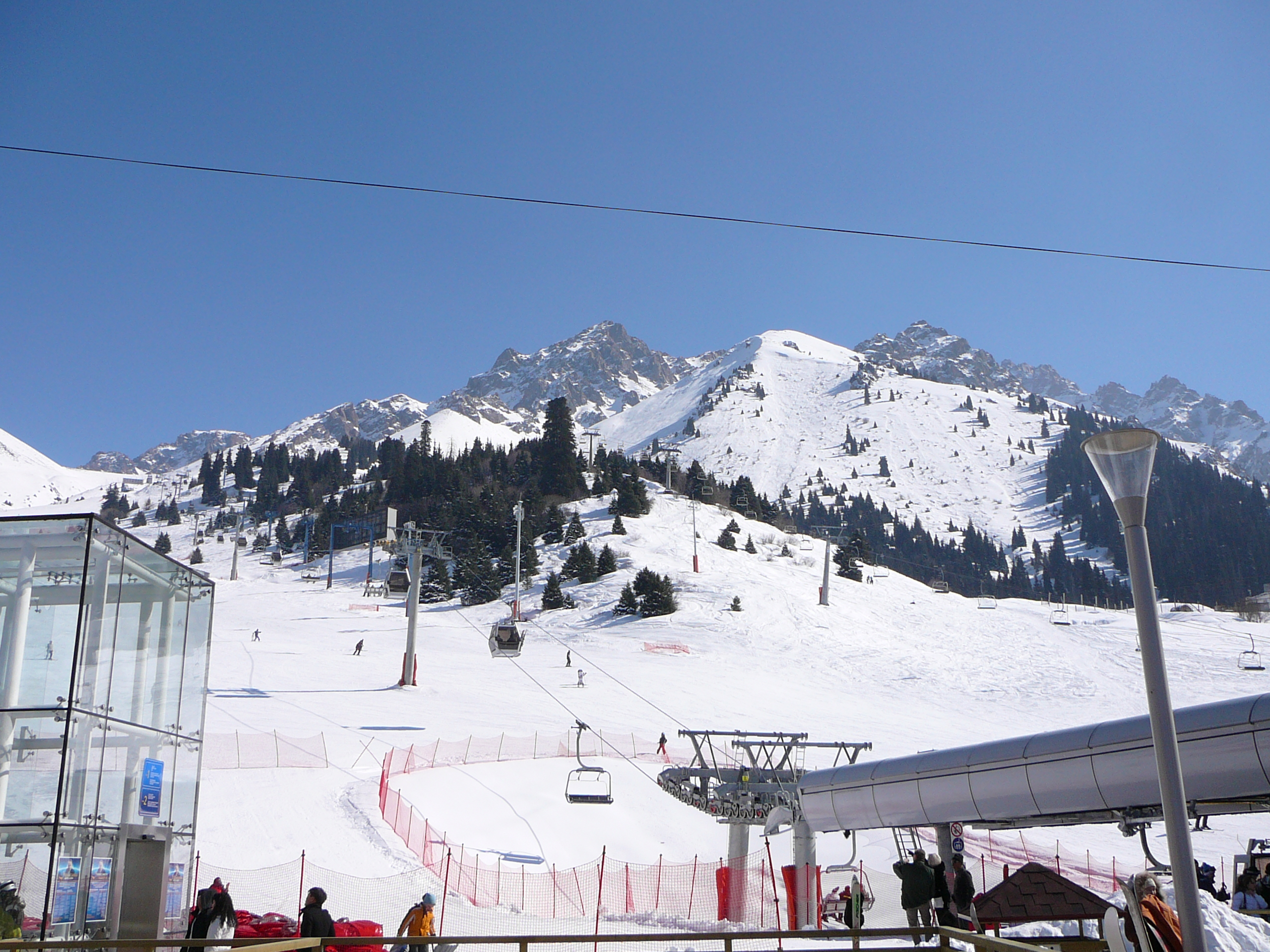
View of the mountains from the cable car station

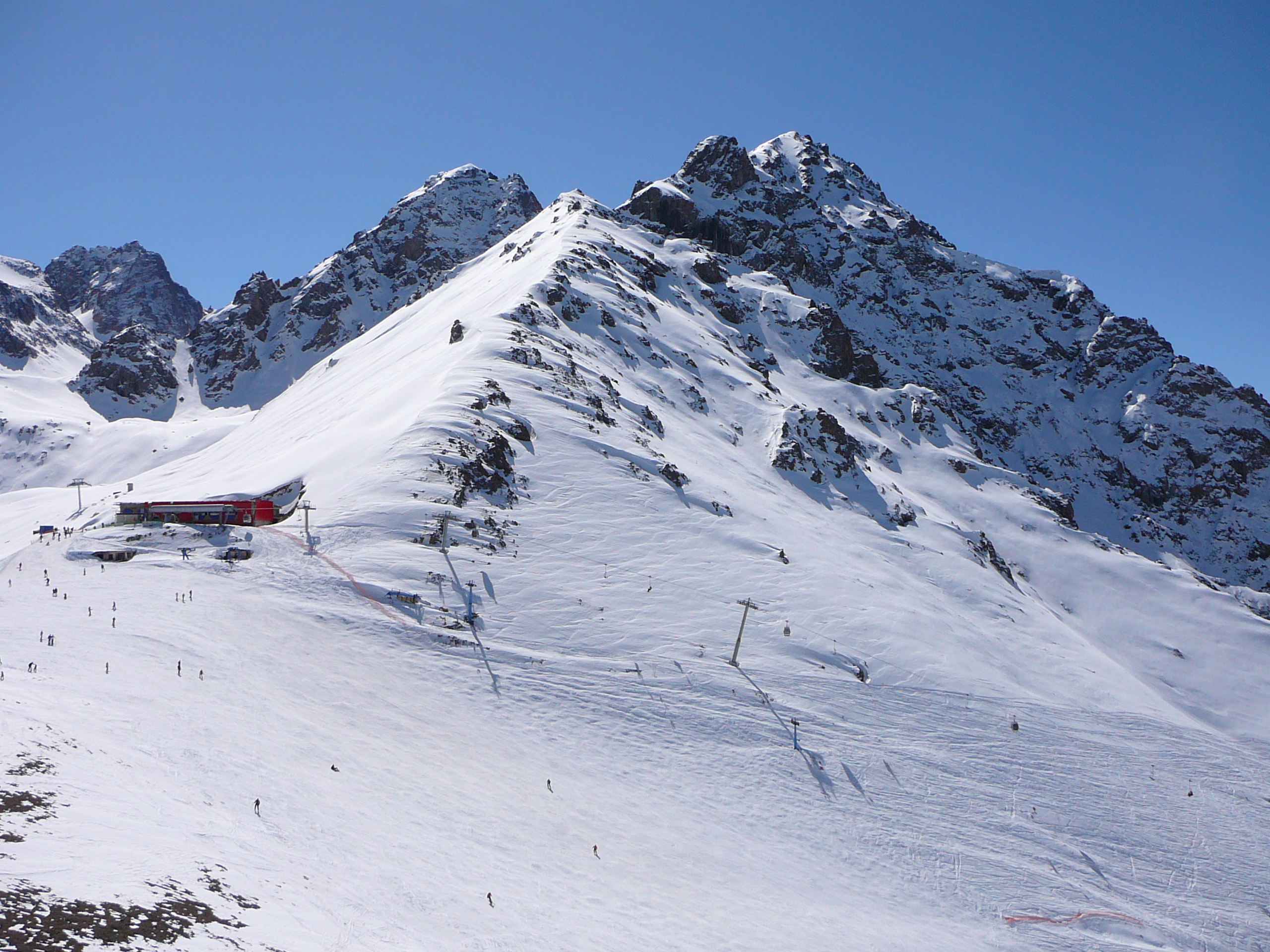
The top point of the ski resort Shymbulak in Talgar Pass

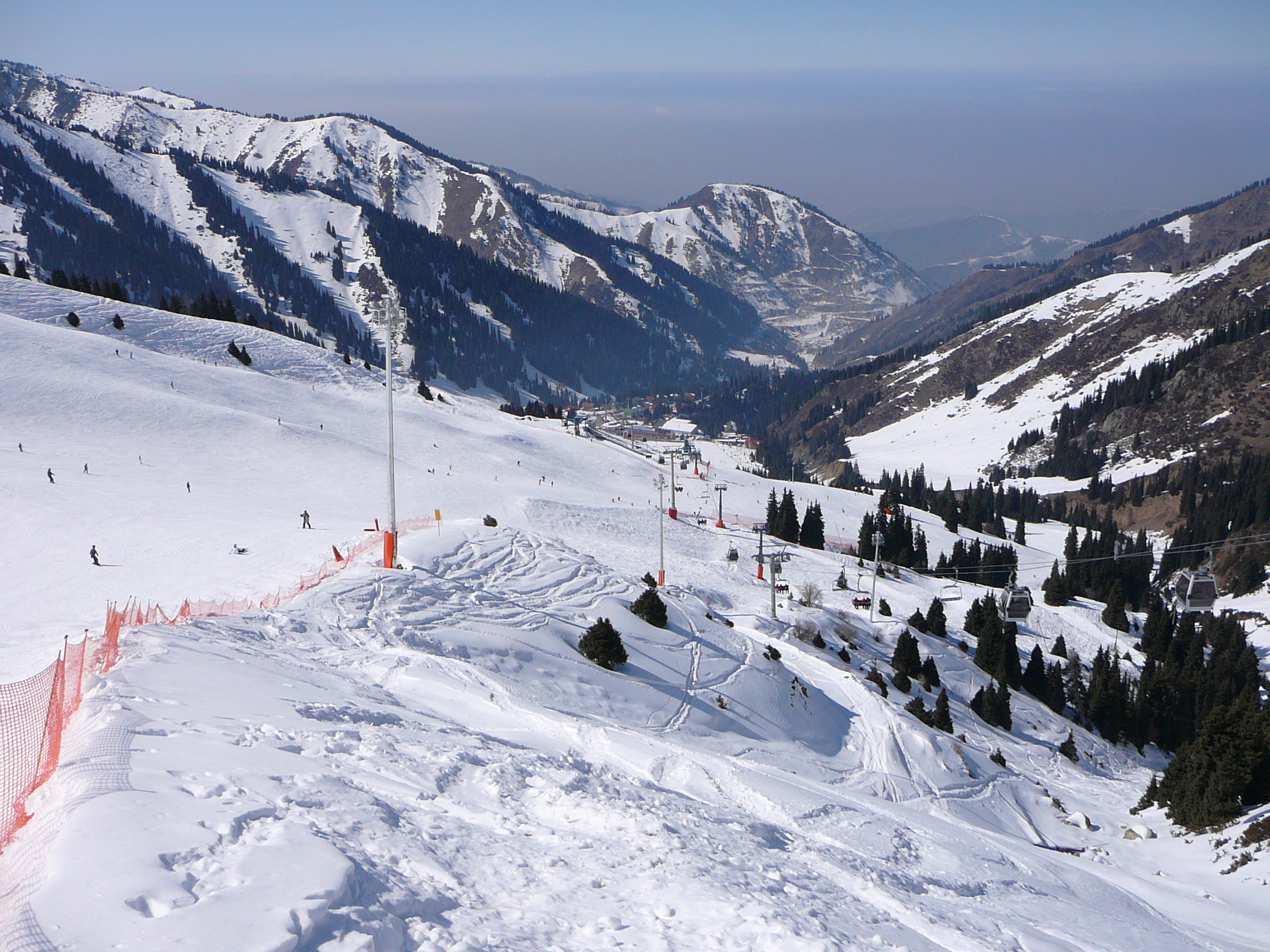
View from the open cabin to the ski slope

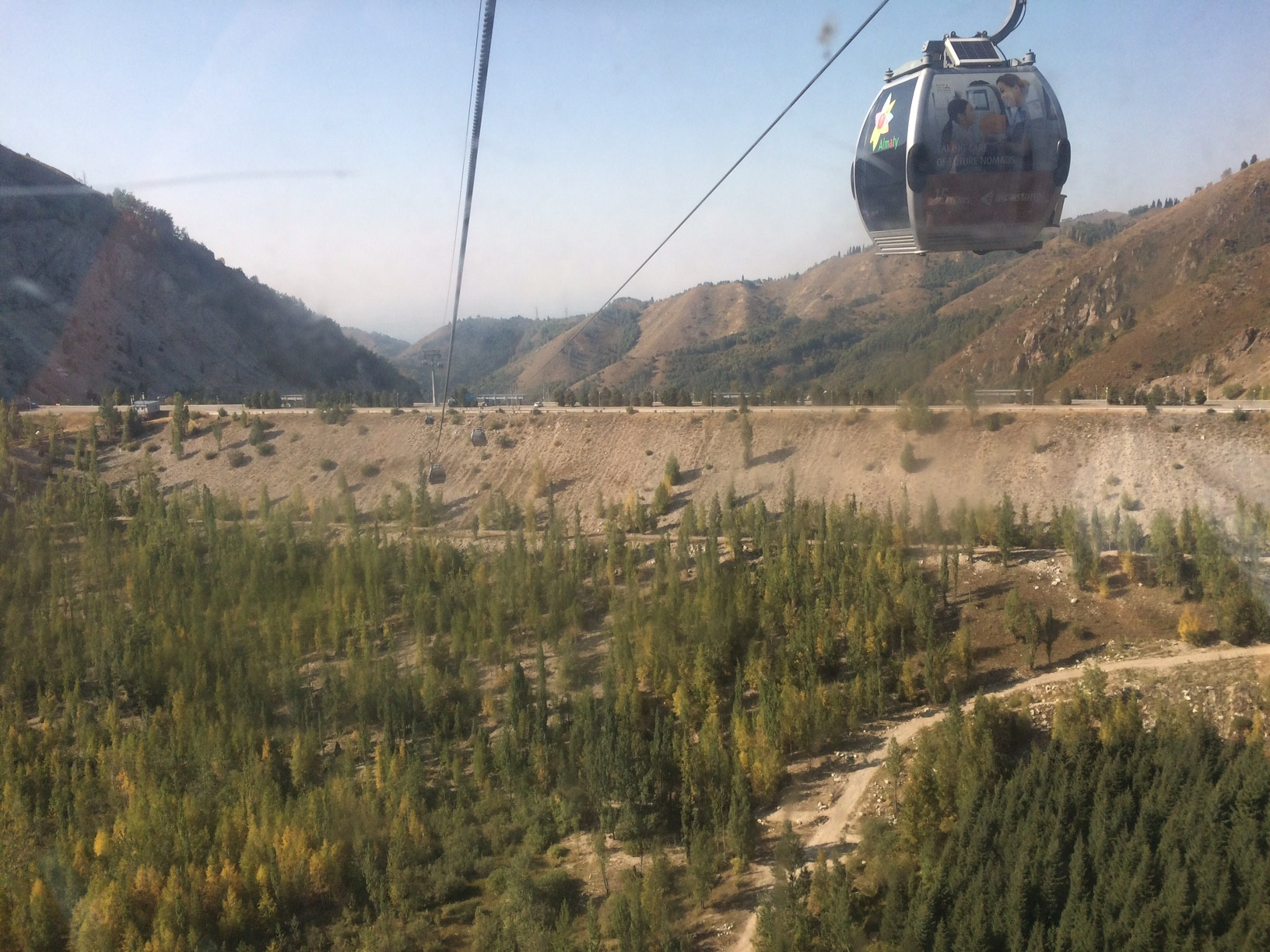
Cableway over the Medeu mudflow protection dam

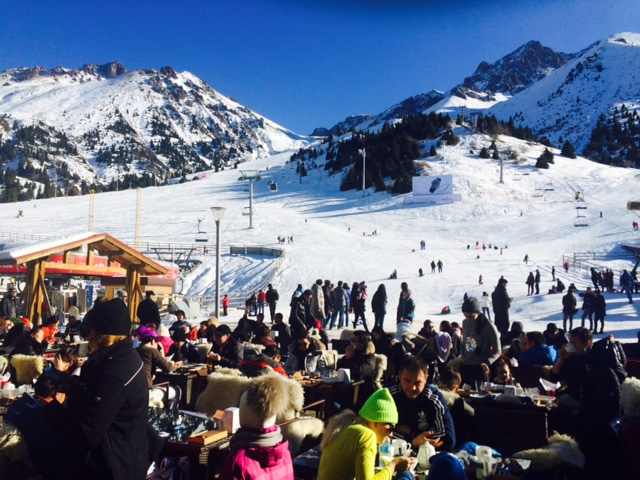
Shymbulak

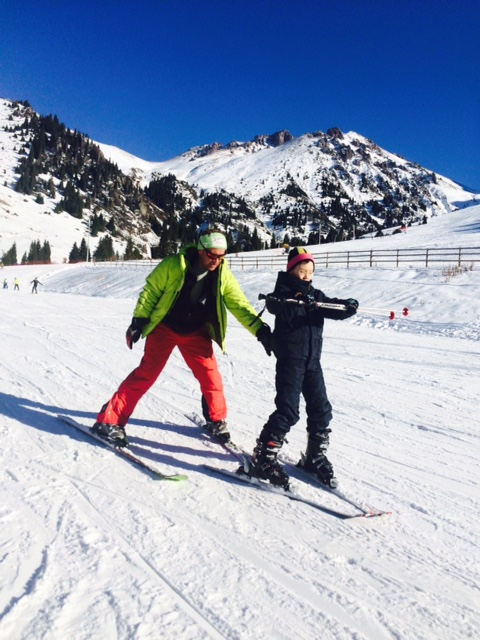
A Shymbulak instructor

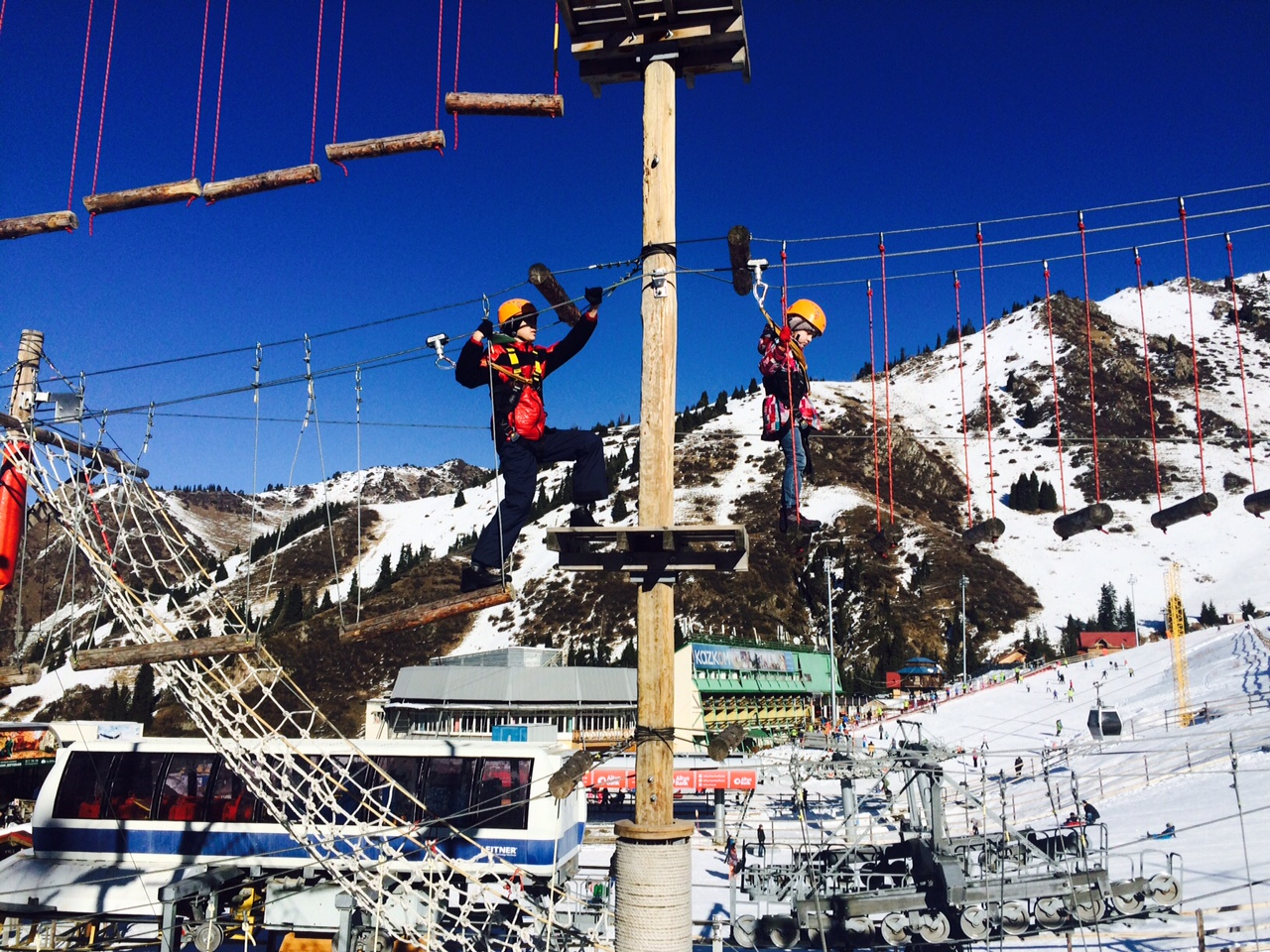
Rope Park

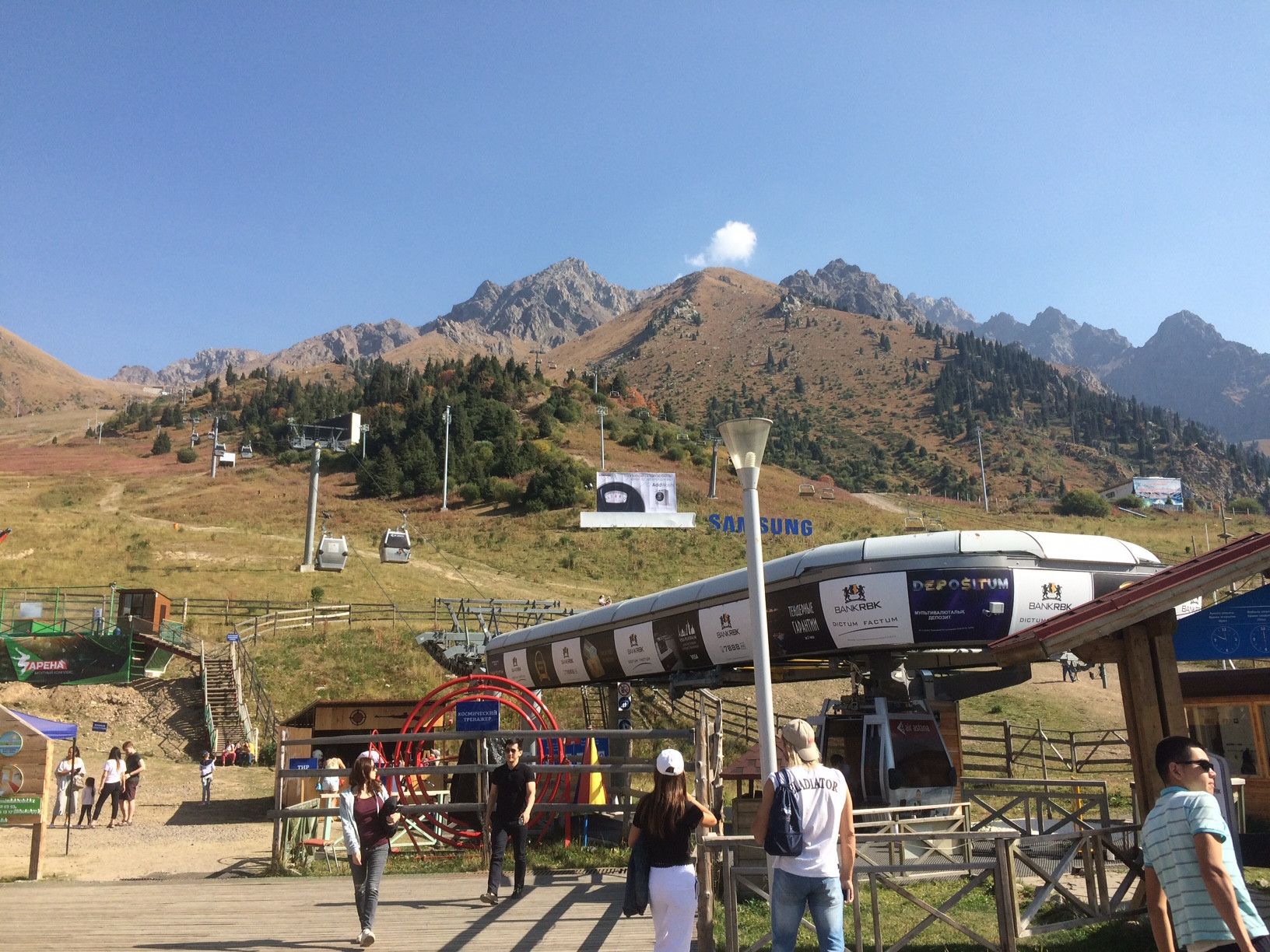
Gondola road from Shymbulak (2260 m) to Talgar pass (3200 m) in summer

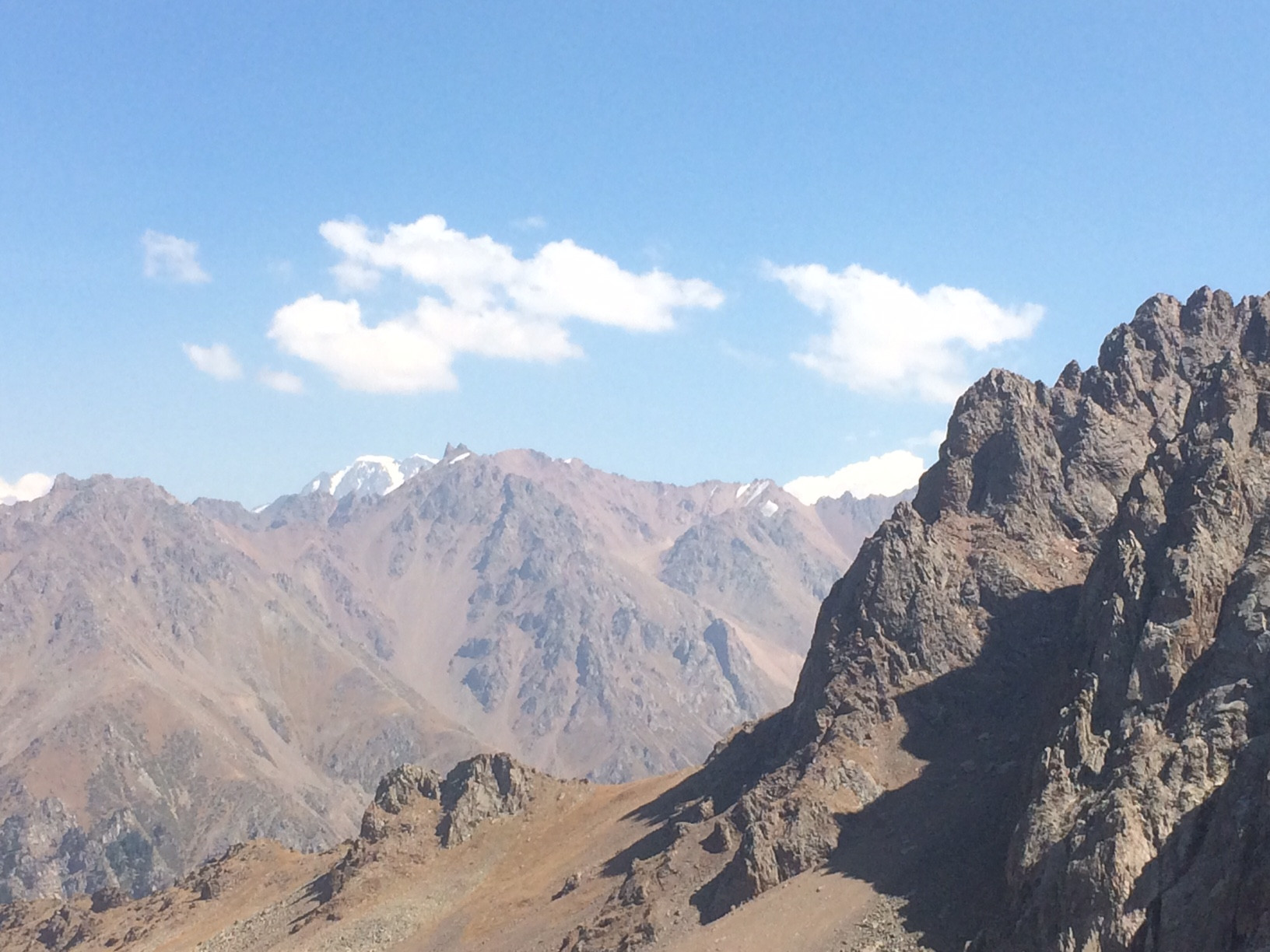
View of Talgar Peak (4979 m) from Talgar Pass in summer

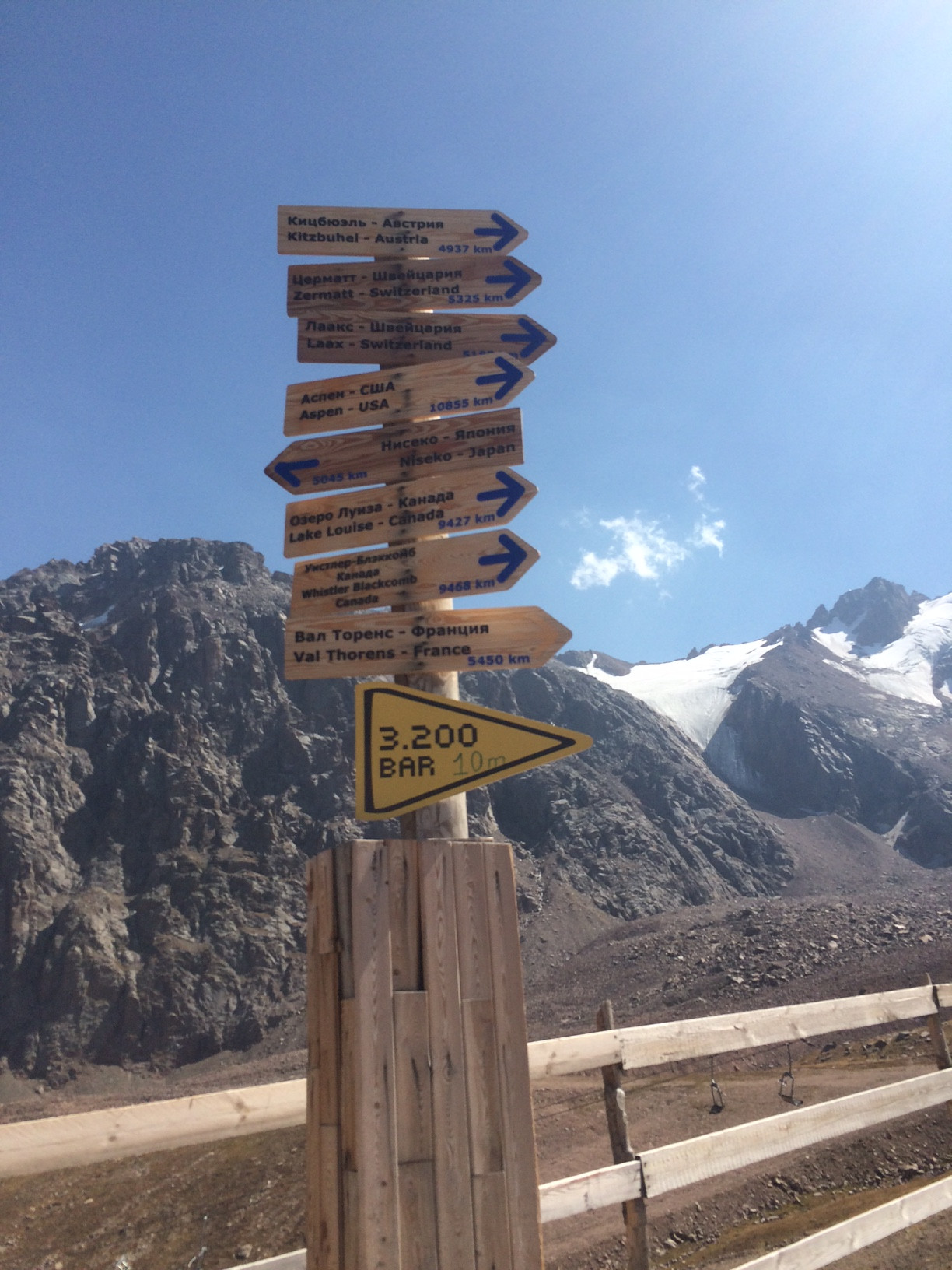
Directional signpost at Talgarsky Pass

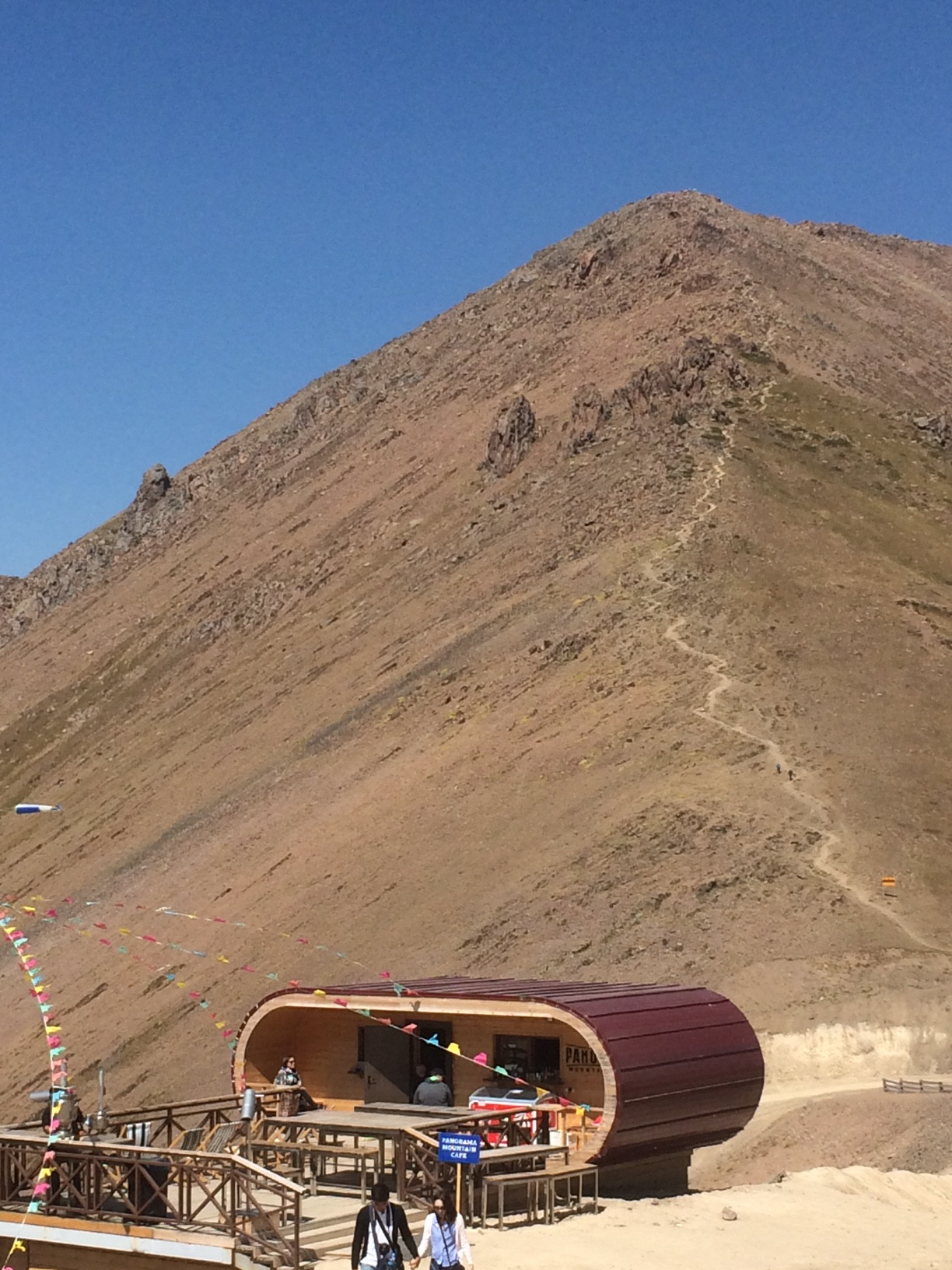
View of Shymbulak Peak in summer from Talgar Pass

== See also ==
- Shymbulak on Wikimapia
- List of ski areas and resorts in Asia
