= 2011 Asian Winter Games =

Multi-sport event in Astana and Almaty, Kazakhstan

VII Asian Winter Games
- Host city: Astana & Almaty, Kazakhstan
- Motto: Unity of purpose ‒ unity of spirit! (Kazakh: Мақсаты бірдің - рухы бір, romanized: Maqsaty bırdıñ - ruhy bır)
- Nations: 26
- Athletes: 843
- Events: 69 events in 5 sports
- Opening: January 30, 2011
- Closing: February 6, 2011
- Opened by: Nursultan Nazarbayev; President of Kazakhstan
- Closed by: Timothy Fok; Vice President of the Olympic Council of Asia
- Athlete's Oath: Nurbegen Zhumagaziyev (short-track ice skating)
- Judge's Oath: Keith Gee Kay Fong
- Torch lighter: 7 Well known Kazakh athletes.
- Main venue: Astana Arena (Opening); Baluan Sholak Sports Palace (Closing)
- Website: astana-almaty2011.kz (archived)

Summer

Winter

The 2011 Asian Winter Games (Kazakh: 2011 жылғы қысқы Азия ойындары, romanized: 2011 jılğı qısqı Azïya oyındarı; Russian: Зимние Азиатские игры 2011 года, romanized: Zimniye Aziatskiye igry 2011 goda), also known as Astana-Almaty 2011 (Kazakh: Астана-Алматы 2011), were a continental winter multi-sport event held from January 30 to February 6, 2011 in Astana and Almaty, Kazakhstan. It was the first time that Kazakhstan hosted such a large event since independence from the Soviet Union. The documents for the hosting city were signed in Kuwait on March 4, 2006.

== Preparation ==
=== Costs ===
Kazakh Minister of Sports Temirkhan Dosmukhambetov notes the US$726 million for construction and renovation comes from the 2008 state budget. The Olympic village, on the other hand, will be financed by private investors. Overall, Kazakhstan is spending over $1.4 billion to get the area ready to host the games.

=== Venues ===
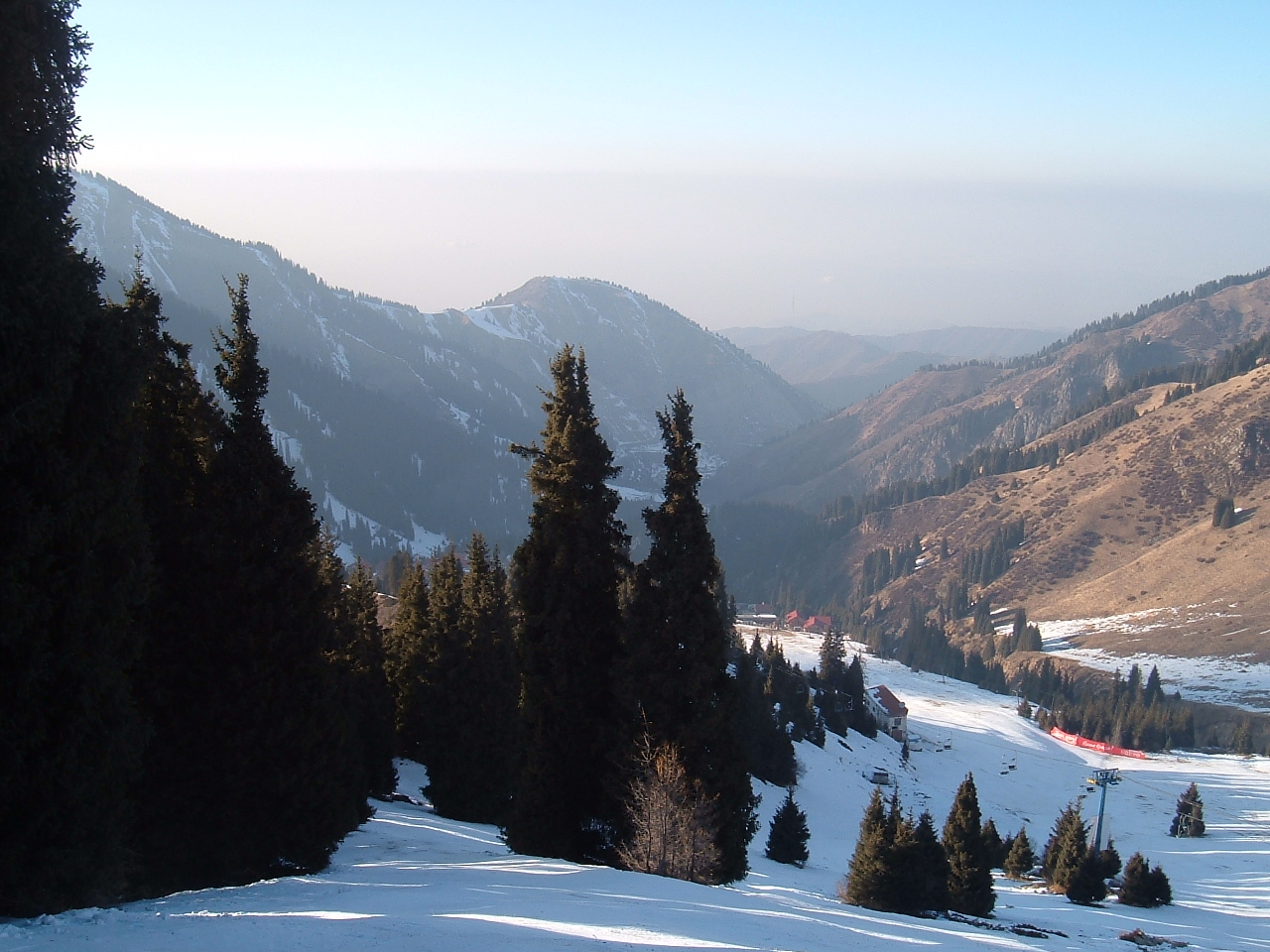
Shymbulak was the site of alpine skiing events

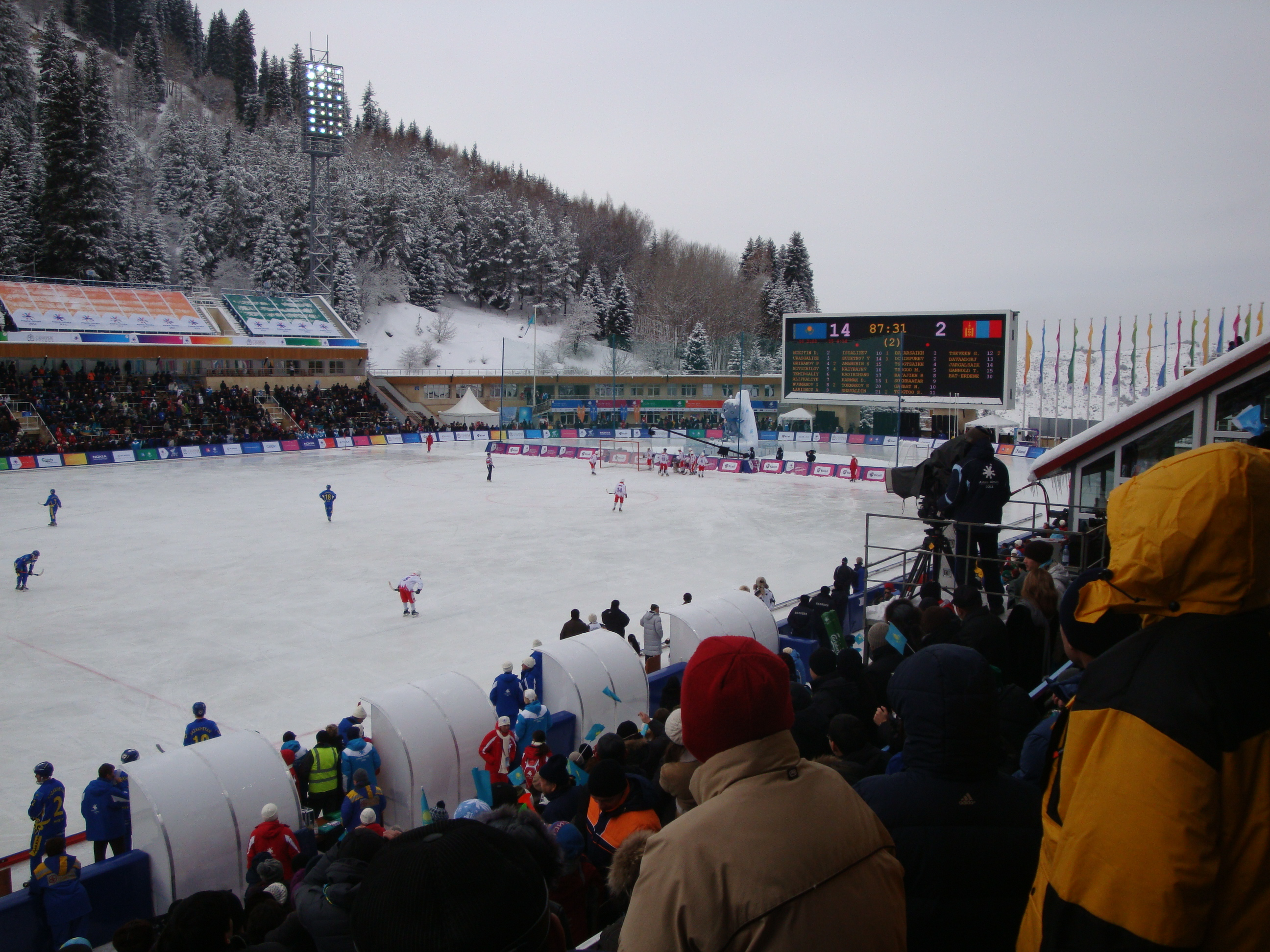
Medeo during the final of the bandy tournament

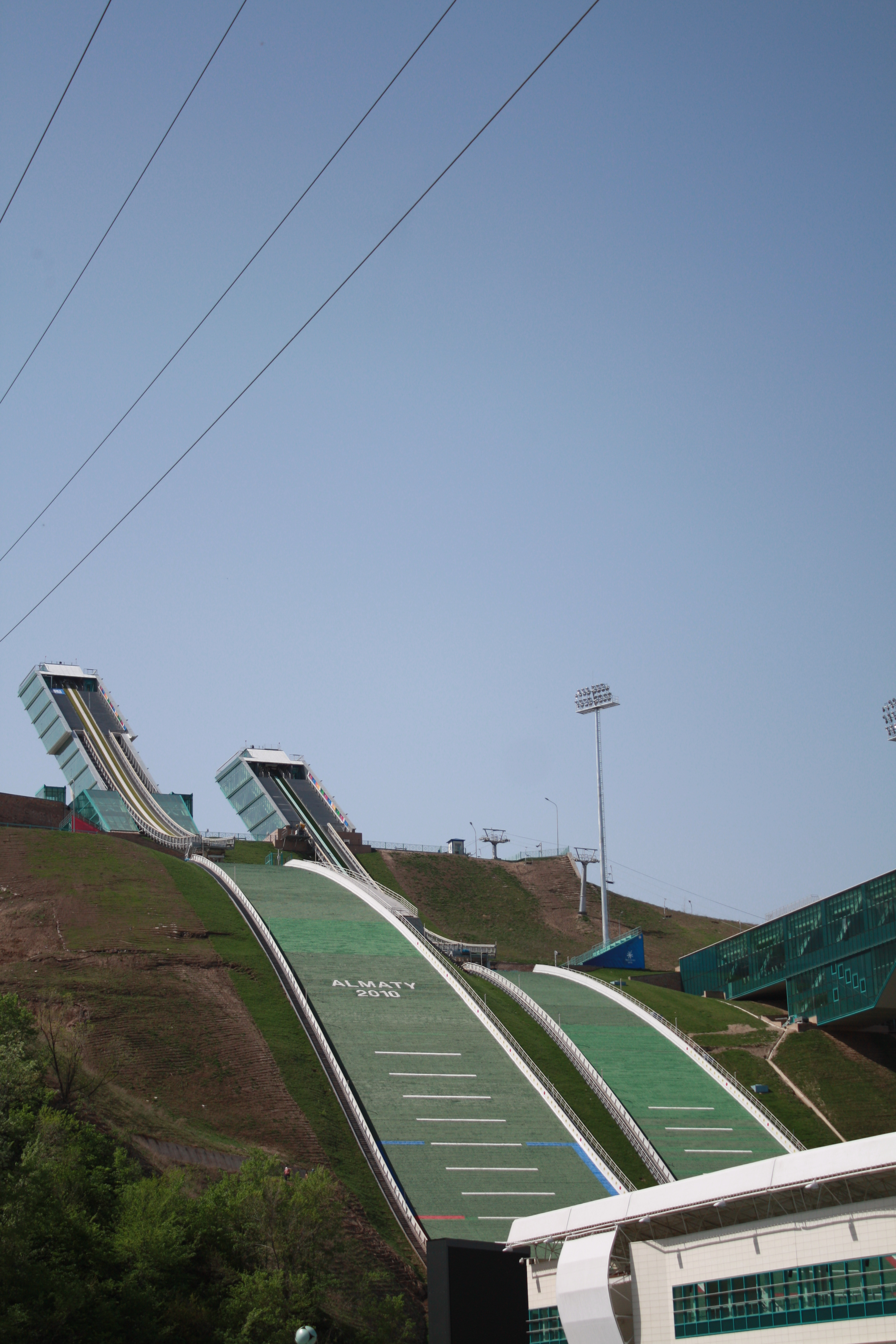
Ski Jump centre in Almaty, built for the Games.

Astana Mayor Imangali Tasmagambetov announced venues being built include a multipurpose Sports Palace which will seat up to 15,000 spectators, a ski jump complex, a biathlon stadium, and an athlete village.

Upgrades to existing venues included modernizing the Central Stadium, the B. Sholak Sports Palace, Medeo Skating Rink, and Shimbulak Ski Resort. The ski area was increased fivefold from the current 5 km to 65 km. In 2008 a gondola lift from Medeo Skating Rink to Shymbulak Ski Resort was planned to be completed, however, only in the summer of 2010 construction really started and was under serious time pressure. The Medeo Skating rink is an outdoor rink located in the Tian Shan Mountains, about a 30-minute drive away.

In 2008, both Medeo and Shymbulak Ski Resort were rebuilt in preparation for the Games. Vladimir Smirnov, deputy head of the national ski federation, said that the resort would soon be one of the largest in the world, which would increase the chances of a successful bid to host the Olympics.

Location	Venue	Sports	Capacity
Astana	Astana Arena	Opening ceremony	30,000
Astana	Alau Ice Palace	Speed skating	8,773
Astana	Kazakhstan Sports Palace (arena 1)	Ice hockey	5,050
Astana	Kazakhstan Sports Palace (arena 2)	Ice hockey	1,200
Astana	Saryarka Velodrome	Short-track speed skating, figure skating	8,000
Almaty	Baluan Sholak Sports Palace	Ice hockey, closing ceremony	5,000
Almaty	Medeo	Bandy	8,500
Almaty	Sunkar International Ski Jumping Complex	Ski jumping	9,500
Almaty	Shymbulak Alpine Sport Resort	Alpine skiing	3,000
Almaty	Soldatskoe Valley Cross Country Skiing and Biathlon Stadium	Biathlon, cross-country skiing, ski orienteering	6,200
Almaty	Tabagan Sport and Recreation Complex	Freestyle skiing	2,250

=== Infrastructures ===
Upgrades to the Almaty airport were finished by December 2008; transport issues are also being reviewed. Millions of KZT are being earmarked for work on main transportation corridors, overpasses, a ring road as well as investment in light rail transit between Talgar, Almaty, and Kaskelen. The plan also included purchases of city passenger buses, taxis, and possibly the construction of a subway.

Almaty also upgraded its power supply network of substations and transmission lines. Expansion and reconstruction of heating systems was also recommended. A portion also got into environmental stabilisation.

=== Torch relay ===
The flame of the Games was officially lit at Kuwait Towers, Kuwait City on January 11, 2011. The relay officially started in Almaty on January 12, 2011, and span around the cities of Kazakhstan for 16 days before arriving at the opening ceremony on January 30, 2011.

Date	City	Length	Number of torchbearers
January 12	Almaty	11.7 km	80
January 13	Taraz	12 km	60
January 14	Shymkent		
January 15	Kyzylorda		
January 16	Aktau		
January 17	Atyrau		
January 18	Oral		
January 19	Aktobe		
January 20	Kostanay		
January 21	Petropavl		
January 22–23	Kokshetau		
January 24	Pavlodar		
January 25–26	Oskemen		
January 27	Taldykorgan		
January 28–29	Karagandy		
January 30	Astana		

== Sports Events ==
Numbers in parentheses indicate the number of medal events contested in each sport.

Olympic sports Bobsleigh, Luge, Skeleton, Snowboarding, Curling and Nordic Combined will not be contested.

Bandy and Ski Orienteering were included for the first time in the Games, while curling and snowboarding was excluded from the list, ski jumping returns to the Games, after not being contested in the last Games in Changchun.

- Alpine skiing (6)
- Bandy (1)
- Biathlon (7)
- Cross-country skiing (12)
- Figure skating (4)
- Freestyle skiing (6)
- Ice hockey (2)
- Short-track speed skating (8)
- Ski jumping (3)
- Ski orienteering (8)
- Speed skating (12)

== Participating NOCs ==
26 countries have registered to take part and they are listed below, this is an increase of 1 from the 2007 games. Bahrain, Qatar and Singapore made their debuts, while Macau and Pakistan did not compete after competing in 2007.

- Afghanistan (1)
- Bahrain (17)
- China (134)
- North Korea (32)
- Hong Kong (3)
- India (11)
- Iran (10)
- Japan (102)
- Jordan (2)
- Kazakhstan (169)
- South Korea (108)
- Athletes from Kuwait (21)
- Kyrgyzstan (53)
- Lebanon (2)
- Malaysia (22)
- Mongolia (52)
- Nepal (1)
- Palestine (2)
- Philippines (3)
- Qatar (4)
- Singapore (1)
- Chinese Taipei (32)
- Tajikistan (2)
- Thailand (25)
- United Arab Emirates (25)
- Uzbekistan (8)

=== Non-Competing nations ===
One country only sent officials.

- Indonesia

== Calendar ==
In the following calendar for the 2011 Asian Winter Games, each blue box represents an event competition, such as a qualification round, on that day. The yellow boxes represent days during which medal-awarding finals for a sport were held.

OC	Opening ceremony	●	Event competitions	1	Event finals	CC	Closing ceremony

January / February 2011	28th Fri	29th Sat	30th Sun	31st Mon	1st Tue	2nd Wed	3rd Thu	4th Fri	5th Sat	6th Sun	Gold medals
Alpine skiing				2	2			2			6
Bandy						●	●	●		1	1
Biathlon				1	1	1		2	1	1	7
Cross-country skiing				2	2	2	2		2	2	12
Figure Skating							●	1	3		4
Freestyle skiing				2	2		2				6
Ice hockey	●	●		●	●	●	1	●	●	1	2
Short-track speed skating				2	2	4					8
Ski jumping				1		1		1			3
Ski orienteering				2		2	2		2		8
Speed skating				2	2	2		2	2	2	12
Total gold medals				14	11	12	7	8	10	7	69
Ceremonies			OC							CC	
January / February 2011	28th Fri	29th Sat	30th Sun	31st Mon	1st Tue	2nd Wed	3rd Thu	4th Fri	5th Sat	6th Sun	Gold medals

Broadcasting

International Games Broadcast Services (IGBS), a joint venture between Host Broadcast Services and IMG Media, served as the host broadcaster of the games. The joint venture previously served as the host broadcaster of the 2006 Asian Games under the name Doha Asian Games Broadcast Services (DAGBS).

== Medal table ==
Kazakhstan won the same number of gold medals on the first day of the competition as it did in the entire 2007 games, topping the medal table for the first time. Iran and Kyrgyzstan won their first ever Asian Winter Games medals, Iran in ski orienteering and alpine skiing and Kyrgyzstan in bandy. Eight countries won medals the most ever at an Asian Winter Games.

Irby, the official mascot of 2011 Asian Winter Games

* Host nation (Kazakhstan)

Rank	Nation	Gold	Silver	Bronze	Total
1	Kazakhstan*	32	21	17	70
2	Japan	13	24	17	54
3	South Korea	13	12	13	38
4	China	11	10	14	35
5	Mongolia	0	1	4	5
6	Iran	0	1	2	3
7	Kyrgyzstan	0	0	1	1
7	North Korea	0	0	1	1
Totals (8 entries)		69	69	69	207

== Stamps ==
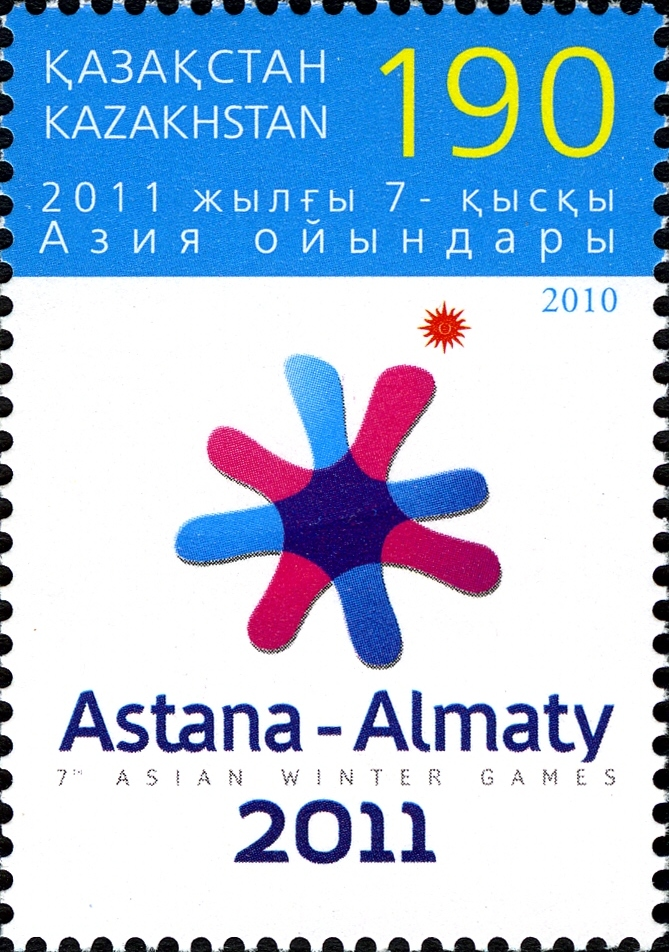
Stamps of Kazakhstan, 2010

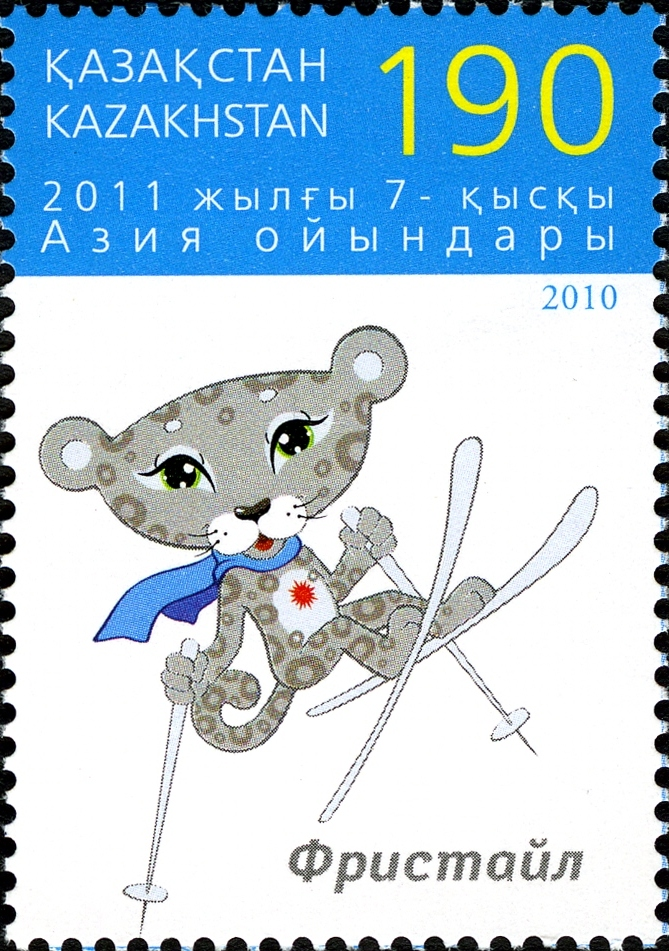
Stamps of Kazakhstan, 2010

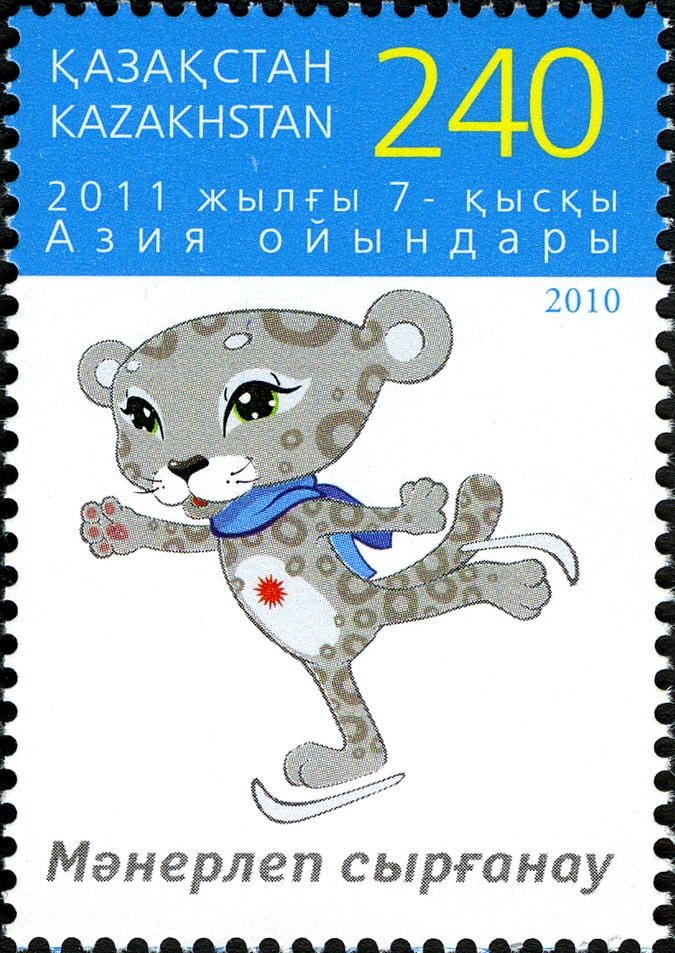
Stamps of Kazakhstan, 2010

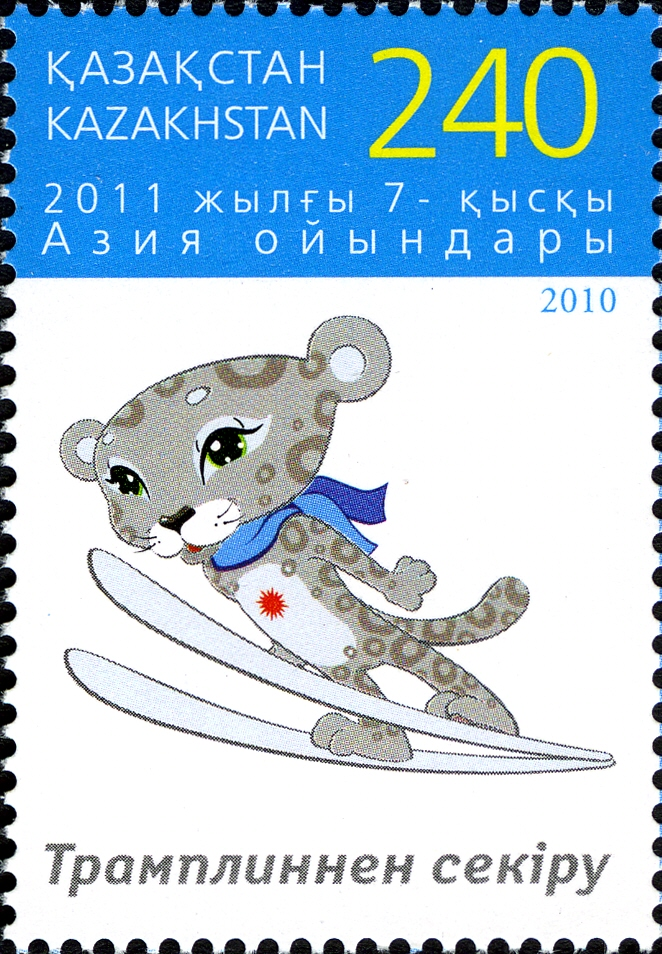
Stamps of Kazakhstan, 2010

Preceded by Changchun	Asian Winter Games; Astana and Almaty; VII Asian Winter Games (2011)	Succeeded by Sapporo
