= Cross-country skiing at the 2015 Winter Universiade – Men's 10 km classic =

The men's 10 km classic competition of the 2015 Winter Universiade was held at the Sporting Centre FIS Štrbské Pleso on January 28.

== Results ==
Rank	Bib	Athlete	Country	Time	Deficit	Note
1st place, gold medalist(s)	89	Andrey Feller	Russia	23:29.2		
2nd place, silver medalist(s)	88	Artem Nikolaev	Russia	23:30	+0.8	
3rd place, bronze medalist(s)	81	Valeriy Gontar	Russia	23:39.3	+10.1	
4	87	Hiroyuki Miyazawa	Japan	23:44.7	+15.5	
5	91	Raul Shakirzianov	Russia	23:47.3	+18.1	
6	84	Yevgeniy Velichko	Kazakhstan	23:53.5	+24.3	
7	92	Andrey Larkov	Russia	24:00.2	+31	
8	90	Ilia Semikov	Russia	24:01.6	+32.4	
9	86	Alexis Jeannerod	France	24:17.6	+48.4	
10	65	Oleksii Krasovskyi	Ukraine	24;23.7	+54.5	
11	83	Takatsugu Uda	Japan	24:24	+54.8	
12	66	Bertrand Hamoumraoui	France	24:30.3	+1:01.1	
13	57	Alexandr Malyshev	Kazakhstan	24:33.5	+1:04.3	
14	75	Luis Stadlober	Austria	24:51.6	+1:22.4	
15	30	Konstantyn Yaremenko	Ukraine	24:52.8	+1:23.6	
16	29	Erik Urgela	Slovakia	25:00.3	+1:31.1	
17	78	Jorgen Grav	Norway	25:04.3	+1:35.1	
18	31	Shang Jincai	China	25:09.3	+1:40.1	
19	80	Aku Nikander	Finland	25:09.4	+1:40.2	
20	54	Yevgeniy Bondarenko	Kazakhstan	25:09.6	+1;40.4	
21	77	Maciej Staręga	Poland	25:11.5	+1:42.3	
22	74	Aurelius Herburger	Austria	25:21.9	+1:52.7	
23	45	Gilberto Panisi	Italy	25:25.8	+1;56.6	
24	69	Jan Antolec	Poland	25:26.1	+1:56.9	
25	73	Kentaro Ishikawa	Japan	25:26.3	+1:57	
26	70	Konrad Motor	Poland	25:27.3	+1:58	
27	50	Andrej Segec	Slovakia	25:27.3	+1:58.1	
28	56	Ruslan Perekhoda	Ukraine	25:29.3	+2:00.1	
29	72	Tomoki Satou	Japan	25:29.6	+2:00.4	
30	47	Lukas Jakeliūnas	Lithuania	25:33.9	+2:04.7	
31	71	Adam Fellner	Czech Republic	25:38.5	+2:09.3	
32	27	Sun Qinghai	China	25:40.2	+2:11	
33	79	Jakub Graf	Czech Republic	25:43.4	+2:14.2	
34	82	Petter Reistad	Norway	25:45.3	+2:16.1	
35	24	Andriy Marchenko	Ukraine	25:48.9	+2:19.7	
35	41	Mateusz Ligocki	Poland	25:48.9	+2:19.7	
37	68	Arnaud du Pasquier	Switzerland	25:49.3	+2:20.1	
38	36	Almas Rakhimbayev	Kazakhstan	25:49.7	+2:20.5	
39	67	Jacob Kordač	Czech Republic	25:50.2	+2:21	
40	64	Max Olex	Germany	25:55.2	+2:26	
41	58	Daniel Maka	Czech Republic	25:55.4	+2;26.2	
42	33	Tautvydas Strolia	Lithuania	25:56.9	+2;27.7	
43	19	Loïc Guigonnet	France	25:57.3	+2:28.1	
44	14	Hamza Dursun	Turkey	25:58.5	+2:29.3	
45	60	Daulet Rakhimbayev	Kazakhstan	25:58.7	+2:29.5	
46	32	Erik Lippestad Thorstensen	Norway	26:01.3	+2:32.1	
47	6	Philipp Bachl	Austria	26:01.9	+2:32.7	
48	62	Phillipp Bellingham	Australia	26:02	+2:32.8	
49	43	Aki Kauppinen	Finland	26:02.3	+2:33.1	
50	55	Reto Hammer	Switzerland	26:03.4	+2:34.2	
51	44	Nikita Tkachenko	Kazakhstan	26:04.7	+2:35.5	
52	35	Pavel Maruha	Belarus	26:08	+2:38.8	
53	40	Rudolf Michalovsky	Slovakia	26:08.6	+2:39.4	
54	85	Imanol Rojo	Spain	26:08.7	+2:39.5	
55	49	Janis Lindegger	Switzerland	26:10.5	+2:41.3	
56	63	Hwang Jun-ho	South Korea	26:13.4	+2:44.2	
57	18	Ivan Marchyshak	Ukraine	26:15.1	+2:45.9	
58	53	Vegard Antonsen	Norway	26:19.1	+2:49.9	
59	51	Johannes Pfab	Germany	26:20	+2:50.8	
60	1	Zhao Dalong	China	26:21.4	+2:52.2	
61	34	David Brunn	Slovakia	26:22.5	+2:53.3	
62	3	Pietro Mosconi	Italy	26:31.6	+3:02.4	
63	52	Lee Jae-bong	South Korea	26:35.7	+3:06.5	
64	59	Philipp Spieß	Switzerland	26:40.9	+3:11.7	
65	23	Michal Polacko	Slovakia	26:45.7	+3:16.5	
66	25	Oleg Yoltukhovskyy	Ukraine	26:46	+3:16.8	
67	21	Andreas Weishaupl	Germany	26:49.6	+3:20.4	
68	61	Callum Watson	Australia	27:00.8	+3:31.6	
69	10	Boldyn Byambadorj	Mongolia	27:01.8	+3:32.6	
70	46	Toni Escher	Germany	27:04.9	+3:35.7	
71	48	Kim Min-uk	South Korea	27:12.5	+3:43.3	
72	26	Jackson Bursill	Australia	27;15.9	+3:46.7	
73	17	Jaunius Drūsys	Lithuania	27:29.8	+4:00.6	
74	28	Mattis Jaama	Estonia	27:39.3	+4:10.1	
75	38	Lee Ho-jin	South Korea	27:41	+4;11.8	
76	42	Kim Hyun-woo	South Korea	27:45.6	+4:16.4	
77	39	Martin Nassar	Estonia	27:49	+4:19.8	
78	20	Savaş Ateş	Turkey	27:58.7	+4:29.5	
79	4	Nathaniel Hough	United States	28:06.2	+4:37	
80	16	William Timmons	United States	28;11	+4:41.8	
81	15	Kyle Bochanski	United States	28:16.6	+4:47.4	
82	5	Achbadrakh Batmunkh	Mongolia	28;19.8	+4:50.6	
83	12	Petter Langård Solberg	Norway	28:27.3	+4:58.1	
84	13	Emmanuele Becchis	Italy	28:46.6	+5:17.4	
85	22	Mart Polluste	Estonia	28:55.4	+5:26.4	
86	9	Patrick Rodgers	United States	29:23.4	+5:54.2	
87	7	Gantulga Otgondavaa	Mongolia	29;27.7	+5:58.5	
88	2	Amarsanaa Baasansuren	Mongolia	29:45.9	+6:16.7	
89	11	Samuel Wiswell	United States	29;47.5	+6:18.3	
90	8	Sindre Solvang	United States	33:51.5	+10:22.3	
	37	Marcel Ott	Switzerland			DNS
	76	Jan Šrail	Czech Republic			DNS
