= Cross-country skiing at the 2015 Winter Universiade – Men's 30 km free mass start =

The men's 30 km free mass start competition of the 2015 Winter Universiade was held at the Sporting Centre FIS Štrbské Pleso on February 1.

== Results ==
Rank	Bib	Athlete	Country	Time	Deficit
1st place, gold medalist(s)	1	Andrey Larkov	Russia	1;16:20.1	
2nd place, silver medalist(s)	2	Raul Shakirzianov	Russia	1;16:20.7	+0.6
3rd place, bronze medalist(s)	4	Artem Nikolaev	Russia	1:16:21.7	+1.6
4	5	Ravil Valiakhmetov	Russia	1:16:21.8	+1.7
5	3	Andrey Feller	Russia	1:16:29.2	+9.1
6	10	Takatsugu Uda	Japan	1:16:33.2	+13.1
7	7	Alexis Jeannerod	France	1:16:36	+15.9
8	28	Yevgeniy Bondarenko	Kazakhstan	1:16:45.4	+25.3
9	12	Valeriy Gontar	Russia	1;16;46	+25.9
10	13	Jakub Gräf	Czech Republic	1;16;58.1	+38
11	17	Tomoki Satou	Japan	1:17:18.7	+58.6
12	9	Yevgeniy Velichko	Kazakhstan	1:18:16.9	+1:56.8
13	8	Imanol Rojo	Spain	1:18:25.8	+2:05.7
14	18	Adam Fellner	Czech Republic	1;18:57.3	+2:37.2
15	55	Loïc Guigonnet	France	1:19:42.6	+3;22.5
16	26	Ruslan Perekhoda	Ukraine	1:20:23.4	+4:03.3
17	19	Arnaud du Pasquier	Switzerland	1:20:24.3	+4:04.2
18	32	Lukas Jakeliūnas	Lithuania	1:20:27.5	+4:07.4
19	34	Toni Escher	Germany	1;20:28.1	+4:08
20	27	Reto Hammer	Switzerland	1:20;44.1	+4:24
21	14	Luis Stadlober	Austria	1:20:45.4	+4:25.3
22	11	Petter Reistad	Norway	1:20:46.2	+4:26.1
23	35	Gilberto Panisi	Italy	1:20:51.5	+4;31.4
24	23	Callum Watson	Australia	1;21:14.6	+4:54.5
25	36	Nikita Tkachenko	Kazakhstan	1;21:24.1	+5:04
26	46	Konstyantyn Yaremenko	Ukraine	1:21:24.7	+5:04.6
27	24	Daulet Rakhimbayev	Kazakhstan	1;21:40.7	+5:20.6
28	30	Johannes Pfab	Germany	1:21:55.1	+5:35
29	50	Oleg Yoltukhovskyy	Ukraine	1:22:17.9	+5:57.8
30	40	Almas Rakhimbayev	Kazakhstan	1:22:51.4	+6:31.3
31	21	Bertrand Hamoumraoui	France	1:23:16.7	+6:56.6
32	47	Erik Urgela	Slovakia	1:23:17.2	+6:57.1
33	53	Andreas Weishäupl	Germany	1:23:21.9	+7:01.8
34	64	Zhao Dalong	China	1:23:23	+7:02.9
35	15	Aurelius Herburger	Austria	1:23:56.9	+7:36.8
36	38	Rudolf Michalovsky	Slovakia	1:24:28.5	+8:08.4
37	57	Hamza Dursun	Turkey	1:24:41.9	+8:21.8
38	51	Andriy Marchenko	Ukraine	1:24:59.8	+8:39.7
39	42	Tautvydas Strolia	Lithuania	1:25:00.7	+8:40.6
40	16	Kentaro Ishikawa	Japan	1:25:07.1	+8:47
41	65	Pietro Mosconi	Italy	1:25:19	+8:58.9
42	20	Jacob Kordač	Czech Republic	1:25:46.6	+9:26.5
43	31	Janis Lindegger	Switzerland	1:26:01.2	+9:41.1
44	41	Pavel Maruha	Belarus	1:26:12.1	+9:52
45	37	Aki Kauppinen	Finland	1:26:40.1	+10:20
46	45	Shang Jincai	China	1:28:16.2	+11:56.1
47	33	Mariusz Dziadkowiec-Michoń	Poland	1:28:24.7	+12:04.6
48	29	Vegard Antonsen	Norway	1:28:43.2	+12:23.1
49	61	Boldyn Byambadorj	Mongolia	1:29;14.9	+12:54.8
50	39	Marcel Ott	Switzerland	1:29:28.7	+13:08.6
51	49	Jackson Bursill	Australia	1:29:46.3	+13;26.2
52	58	Emmanuele Becchis	Italy	1:31:10.5	+14;50.4
53	60	Samuel Wiswell	United States	1:31:55.4	+15;35.4
54	56	William Timmons	United States	1:32:18.6	+15:58.5
55	69	Batmunkh Achbadrakh	Mongolia	1:32:46.7	+16:26.6
56	66	Otgondavaa Gantulga	Mongolia	1:34;45.3	+18:25.2
57	59	Petter Langaard Solberg	Norway	1:35:19.5	+18;59.4
58	68	Baasansuren Amarsanaa	Mongolia	1:38:43.8	+22:23.7
59	67	Evan Girard	Canada	1:41:44.9	+25:24.8
	22	Phillip Bellingham	Australia	DNF	
	43	Wojciech Suchwalko	Poland	DNF	
	44	Erik Lippestad Thorstensen	Norway	DNF	
	52	Michal Polacko	Slovakia	DNF	
	54	Savaș Ateș	Turkey	DNF	
	63	Dario Giovine	Italy	DNF	
	6	Hiroyuki Miyazawa	Japan	DNS	
	25	Daniel Maka	Czech Republic	DNS	
	48	Sun Qinghai	China	DNS	
	62	Philipp Bachl	Austria	DNS	
