= Cross-country skiing at the 2015 Winter Universiade – Men's sprint free =

The men's sprint free competition of the 2015 Winter Universiade was held at the Sporting Centre FIS Štrbské Pleso on January 25.

== Results ==
=== Qualification ===
Rank	Bib	Athlete	Country	Time	Deficit	Note
1	2	Maciej Staręga	Poland	3:16.85		Q
2	1	Anton Gafarov	Russia	3:18.26	+1.41	Q
3	21	Luis Stadlober	Austria	3:18.71	+1.86	Q
4	7	Konrad Motor	Poland	3:20.78	+3.93	Q
5	4	Phillip Bellingham	Australia	3:20.87	+4.02	Q
6	3	Hiroyuki Miyazawa	Japan	3:21.38	+4.53	Q
7	11	Ravil Valiakhmetov	Russia	3:21.52	+4.67	Q
8	6	Andrey Feller	Russia	3:21.53	+4.68	Q
9	9	Raul Shakirzianov	Russia	3:21.55	+4.70	Q
10	80	Lucas Chavanat	France	3:22.54	+5.69	Q
11	23	Yevgeniy Bondarenko	Kazakhstan	3:22.93	+6.08	Q
12	5	Roman Ragozin	Kazakhstan	3:23.27	+6.42	Q
13	18	Ilia Semikov	Russia	3:23.67	+6.82	Q
14	8	Andrey Larkov	Russia	3:23.91	+7.06	Q
15	19	Ruslan Perekhoda	Ukraine	3:24.10	+7.25	Q
16	68	Aurelius Herburger	Austria	3:24.50	+7.65	Q
17	12	Jan Antolec	Poland	3:24.68	+7.83	Q
18	33	Loïc Guigonnet	France	3:24.87	+8.02	Q
19	14	Daniel Maka	Czech Republic	3:25.06	+8.21	Q
20	16	Sun Qinghai	China	3:25.85	+9.00	Q
21	36	Daulet Rakhimbayev	Kazakhstan	3:25.96	+9.11	Q
22	29	Mateusz Ligocki	Poland	3:26.26	+9.41	Q
23	25	Jorgen Grav	Norway	3:26.32	+9.47	Q
24	46	Max Olex	Germany	3:26.37	+9.52	Q
25	42	Tomoki Satou	Japan	3:27.24	+10.39	Q
26	26	Andrej Segec	Slovakia	3:27.27	+10.42	Q
27	44	Takatsugu Uda	Japan	3:27.34	+10.49	Q
28	10	Mark Starostin	Kazakhstan	3:27.45	+10.60	Q
29	43	Oleksii Krasovskyi	Ukraine	3:27.71	+10.86	Q
30	20	Callum Watson	Australia	3:27.83	+10.98	Q
31	47	Oleg Yoltukhovskyy	Ukraine	3:28.24	+11.39	
32	13	Kentaro Ishikawa	Japan	3:28.37	+11.52	
33	30	Philipp Spiess	Switzerland	3:29.25	+12.40	
34	69	Erik Urgela	Slovakia	3:29.31	+12.46	
35	32	Martin Kapso	Slovakia	3:29.40	+12.55	
36	76	Philipp Bachl	Austria	3:29.99	+13.14	
37	15	Petter Reistad	Norway	3:30.24	+13.39	
38	27	Rudolf Michalovsky	Slovakia	3:31.00	+14.15	
39	55	Gilberto Panisi	Italy	3:31.96	+15.11	
40	40	Johannes Pfab	Germany	3:32.16	+15.31	
41	31	Reto Hammer	Switzerland	3:32.41	+15.56	
42	22	Erik Lippestad Thorstensen	Norway	3:32.44	+15.59	
43	37	Arnaud du Pasquier	Switzerland	3:32.79	+15.94	
44	39	Jackson Bursill	Australia	3:33.60	+16.75	
45	53	Kostyantyn Yaremenko	Ukraine	3:33.87	+17.02	
46	45	Lukas Jakeliunas	Lithuania	3:34.15	+17.30	
47	73	Hamza Dursun	Turkey	3:34.33	+17.48	
48	41	Vegard Antonsen	Norway	3:34.59	+17.74	
49	28	David Brunn	Slovakia	3:35.74	+18.89	
50	35	Pavel Maruha	Belarus	3:35.83	+18.98	
51	71	Andreas Weishaupl	Germany	3:35.85	+19.00	
52	38	Milán Szabó	Hungary	3:36.03	+19.18	
53	50	Shang Jincai	China	3:36.41	+19.56	
54	72	Ivan Marchyshak	Ukraine	3:36.61	+19.76	
55	56	Emanuele Becchis	Italy	3:36.93	+20.08	
56	17	Mattis Jaama	Estonia	3:38.70	+21.85	
57	79	Dario Giovine	Italy	3:39.01	+22.16	
58	24	Mart Polluste	Estonia	3:39.15	+22.30	
59	54	Nikita Tkachenko	Kazakhstan	3:39.19	+22.34	
60	49	Tautvydas Strolia	Lithuania	3:39.56	+22.71	
61	51	Aku Nikander	Finland	3:41.23	+24.38	
62	34	Martin Nassar	Estonia	3:43.79	+26.94	
63	78	Zhao Dalong	China	3:45.12	+28.27	
64	52	Hwang Jun-ho	South Korea	3:45.83	+28.98	
65	74	Petter Langård Solberg	Norway	3:46.83	+29.98	
66	75	Boldyn Byambadorj	Mongolia	3:47.91	+31.06	
67	58	Ha Tae-bok	South Korea	3:48.02	+31.17	
68	63	Kim Eun-ho	South Korea	3:49.49	+32.64	
69	48	Jaunius Drūsys	Lithuania	3:49.92	+33.07	
70	60	Savaş Ateş	Turkey	3:52.30	+35.45	
71	61	Kyle Bochanski	United States	3:52.86	+36.01	
72	81	Amarsanaa Baasansuren	Mongolia	3:52.94	+36.09	
73	57	Kim Min-uk	South Korea	3:53.60	+36.75	
74	64	Benjamin Noren	United States	3:54.13	+37.28	
75	82	Pietro Mosconi	Italy	3:54.77	+37.92	
76	70	Andriy Marchenko	Ukraine	3:58.00	+41.15	
77	84	Gantulga Otgondavaa	Mongolia	3:58.40	+41.55	
78	77	Achbadrakh Batmunkh	Mongolia	3:59.45	+42.60	
79	65	Taylor Vignaroli	United States	4:00.86	+44.01	
80	66	Samuel Wiswell	United States	4:01.16	+44.31	
81	62	Lee Ho-jin	South Korea	4:01.22	+44.37	
82	59	Cho Yong-jin	South Korea	4:01.66	+44.81	
83	67	Sindre Solvang	United States	4:24.92	+1:08.07	
	83	Nathaniel Hough	United States	DNS		

=== Finals ===
==== Quarterfinals ====
Quarterfinal 1

Rank	Seed	Athlete	Country	Time	Deficit	Note
1	1	Maciej Staręga	Poland	3:25.87		Q
2	10	Lucas Chanavat	France	3:27.09	+1.22	Q
3	21	Daulet Rakhimbayev	Kazakhstan	3:29.15	+3.28	
4	11	Yevgeniy Bondarenko	Kazakhstan	3:29.21	+3.34	
5	30	Callum Watson	Australia	3:31.67	+5.80	
6	20	Sun Qinghai	China	3:41.69	+15.82	

Quarterfinal 2

Rank	Seed	Athlete	Country	Time	Deficit	Note
1	7	Ravil Valiakhmetov	Russia	3:30.19		Q
2	14	Andrey Larkov	Russia	3:30.23	+0.04	Q
3	24	Max Olex	Germany	3:30.44	+0.25	
4	4	Konrad Motor	Poland	3:30.78	+0.59	
5	27	Takatsugu Uda	Japan	3:31.91	+1.72	
6	17	Jan Antolec	Poland	3:39.35	+9.16	

Quarterfinal 3

Rank	Seed	Athlete	Country	Time	Deficit	Note
1	5	Philipp Bellingham	Australia	3:30.40		Q
2	16	Aurelius Herburger	Austria	3:30.49	+0.09	Q
3	6	Hiroyuki Miyazawa	Japan	3:30.59	+0.19	
4	26	Andrej Segec	Slovakia	3:32.82	+2.42	
5	15	Ruslan Perekhoda	Ukraine	3:36.46	+6.06	
6	25	Tomoki Satou	Japan	3:40.74	+10.34	

Quarterfinal 4

Rank	Seed	Athlete	Country	Time	Deficit	Note
1	9	Raul Shakirzianov	Russia	3:22.17		Q
2	2	Anton Gafarov	Russia	3:24.16	+1.99	Q
3	12	Roman Ragozin	Kazakhstan	3:25.06	+2.89	LL
4	29	Oleksii Krasovskyi	Ukraine	3:27.56	+5.39	
5	19	Daniel Maka	Czech Republic	3:29.72	+7.55	
6	22	Mateusz Ligocki	Poland	3:34.18	+12.01	

Quarterfinal 5

Rank	Seed	Athlete	Country	Time	Deficit	Note
1	3	Luis Stadlober	Austria	3:25.72		Q
2	8	Andrey Feller	Russia	3:25.83	+0.11	Q
3	18	Loïc Guigonnet	France	3:26.32	+0.60	LL
4	23	Jorgen Grav	Norway	3:28.29	+2.57	
5	13	Ilia Semikov	Russia	3:34.01	+8.29	
6	28	Mark Starostin	Kazakhstan	3:35.85	+10.13	

==== Semifinals ====
Semifinal 1

Rank	Seed	Athlete	Country	Time	Deficit	Note
1	14	Andrey Larkov	Russia	3:23.19		Q
2	1	Maciej Staręga	Poland	3:23.32	+0.13	Q
3	10	Lucas Chavanat	France	3:23.91	+0.72	LL
4	5	Phillip Bellingham	Australia	3:26.75	+3.56	
5	7	Ravil Valiakhmetov	Russia	3:29.74	+6.55	
6	18	Loïc Guigonnet	France	3:51.21	+28.02	

Semifinal 2

Rank	Seed	Athlete	Country	Time	Deficit	Note
1	9	Raul Shakirzianov	Russia	3:25.00		Q
2	2	Anton Gafarov	Russia	3:25.24	+0.24	Q
3	16	Aurelius Herburger	Austria	3:25.48	+0.48	LL
4	3	Luis Stadlober	Austria	3:27.98	+2.98	
5	8	Andrey Feller	Russia	3:28.78	+3.78	
6	12	Roman Ragozin	Kazakhstan	3:39.15	+14.15	

==== Final ====
Rank	Seed	Athlete	Country	Time	Deficit	Note
1st place, gold medalist(s)	14	Andrey Larkov	Russia	3:22.41		
2nd place, silver medalist(s)	2	Anton Gafarov	Russia	3:22.59	+0.18	
3rd place, bronze medalist(s)	9	Raul Shakirzianov	Russia	3:23.64	+1.23	
4	1	Maciej Staręga	Poland	3:25.99	+3.58	
5	16	Aurelius Herburger	Austria	3:39.95	+15.54	
6	10	Lucas Chavanat	France	3:56.38	+33.97	
