= Cross-country skiing at the 2011 Asian Winter Games – Men's 15 kilometre freestyle =

Men's 15 kilometre freestyle at the 2011 Asian Winter Games
- Venue: Biathlon and Cross-Country Ski Complex
- Dates: 2 February 2011
- Competitors: 9 from 5 nations

Medalists
gold medal	Keishin Yoshida	Japan
silver medal	Nobu Naruse	Japan
bronze medal	Nikolay Chebotko	Kazakhstan

The men's 15 kilometre freestyle at the 2011 Asian Winter Games was held on February 2, 2011 at Biathlon and Cross-Country Ski Complex, Almaty.

== Schedule ==
All times are Almaty Time (UTC+06:00)

Date	Time	Event
Wednesday, 2 February 2011	14:35	Final

== Results ==
Legend

- DNF — Did not finish
- DSQ — Disqualified

Rank	Athlete	Time
1st place, gold medalist(s)	Keishin Yoshida (JPN)	49:31.0
2nd place, silver medalist(s)	Nobu Naruse (JPN)	49:58.5
3rd place, bronze medalist(s)	Nikolay Chebotko (KAZ)	51:30.1
4	Sergey Cherepanov (KAZ)	52:31.8
5	Tashi Lundup (IND)	1:00:48.3
6	Nadeem Iqbal (IND)	1:05:32.1
7	Omar Rona (AFG)	1:27:32.9
—	Lee Jun-gil (KOR)	DNF
—	Jung Eui-myung (KOR)	DSQ
