= Cross-country skiing at the 2015 Winter Universiade – Men's 4 x 7.5 km relay =

The men's 4×7.5 km classic competition of the 2015 Winter Universiade was held at the Sporting Centre FIS Štrbské Pleso on January 30.

== Results ==
Rank	Bib	Nation	Skiers	Time	Deficit
1st place, gold medalist(s)	2	Russia	Andrey Feller (22:54.8); Artem Nikolaev (22:38.5); Raul Shakirzianov (18:38.3); Andrey Larkov (18:37.4)	1:22:49	
2nd place, silver medalist(s)	1	Kazakhstan	Alexandr Malyshev (23:52.1); Yevgeniy Velichko (22:50.1); Yevgeniy Bondarenko (19:14.8); Mark Starostin (18:45.7)	1:24:42.7	+1:53.7
3rd place, bronze medalist(s)	4	Czech Republic	Jacob Kordač (23:39.5); Adam Fellner (24:04.7); Jakub Gräf (18:51.4); Daniel Maka (19;10.4)	1:25:46	+2:57
4	10	France	Alexis Jeannerod (23:34.9); Bertrand Hamoumraoui (23:44.3); Loïc Guigonnet (19:15.4); Lucas Chanavat (19:11.5)	1:25:46.1	+2:57
5	3	Japan	Kentaro Ishikawa (25:32.7); Hiroyuki Miyazawa (22:57.2); Tomoki Satou (19:25.2); Takatsugu Uda (18:21.5)	1:26:16.6	+3:27.6
6	7	Ukraine	Oleksii Krasovskyi (23:41.7); Konstyantyn Yaremenko (23:58.7); Oleg Yoltukhovskyy (20;26); Ruslan Perekhoda (19:35.1)	1;27:41.5	+4:52.5
7	6	Norway	Jørgen Grav (23:44.7); Erik Lippestad Thorstensen (24:20.2); Vegard Antonsen (20:46.1); Petter Reistad (19:28.5)	1:28:19.5	+5:30.5
8	15	Poland	Jan Antolec (24:47.5); Wojciech Suchwałko (26:17.7); Maciej Staręga (19;06.1); Mateusz Ligocki (19;11)	1:29:22.3	+6:33.3
9	9	Germany	Max Olex (25:04); Johannes Pfab (25:34.7); Andreas Weishaupl (19:31.6); Toni Escher (19;14.3)	1:29:24.6	+6:35.6
10	8	Slovakia	Andrej Segeč (24:51.1); Erik Urgela (24:35.4); Rudolf Michalovsky (19:58.8); David Brunn (20;27.7)	1:29:53	+7:04
11	11	Switzerland	Arnaud du Pasquier (25:43.7); Janis Lindegger (24:34.8); Philipp Spieß (20:23.5); Reto Hammer (19:27.1)	1:30:09.1	+7:20.1
12	5	Italy	Gilberto Panisi (25:03); Pietro Mosconi (24:45.8); Dario Giovine (21:07.2); Emmanuele Becchis (21:09.9)	1:32:05.9	+9:16.9
13	12	South Korea	Ha Tae-bok (26:55.7); Lee Jae-bong (26:22.9); Kim Eun-ho (21:14.7); Cho Yong-jin (20:42.4)	1:35:15.7	+12:26.7
14	13	Mongolia	Otgondavaa Gantulga (28:02.1); Batmunkh Achbadrakh (25:52.2); Boldyn Byambadorj (23:06.3); Baasansuren Amarsanaa (24:28.8)	1:41:29.4	+18:40.4
15	14	United States	Nathaniel Hough (27:55.8); Taylor Vignaroli (29:47.3); Patrick Rodgers; Benjamin Noren	LAP	
