= Alexey Poltoranin =

Kazakhstani cross-country skier

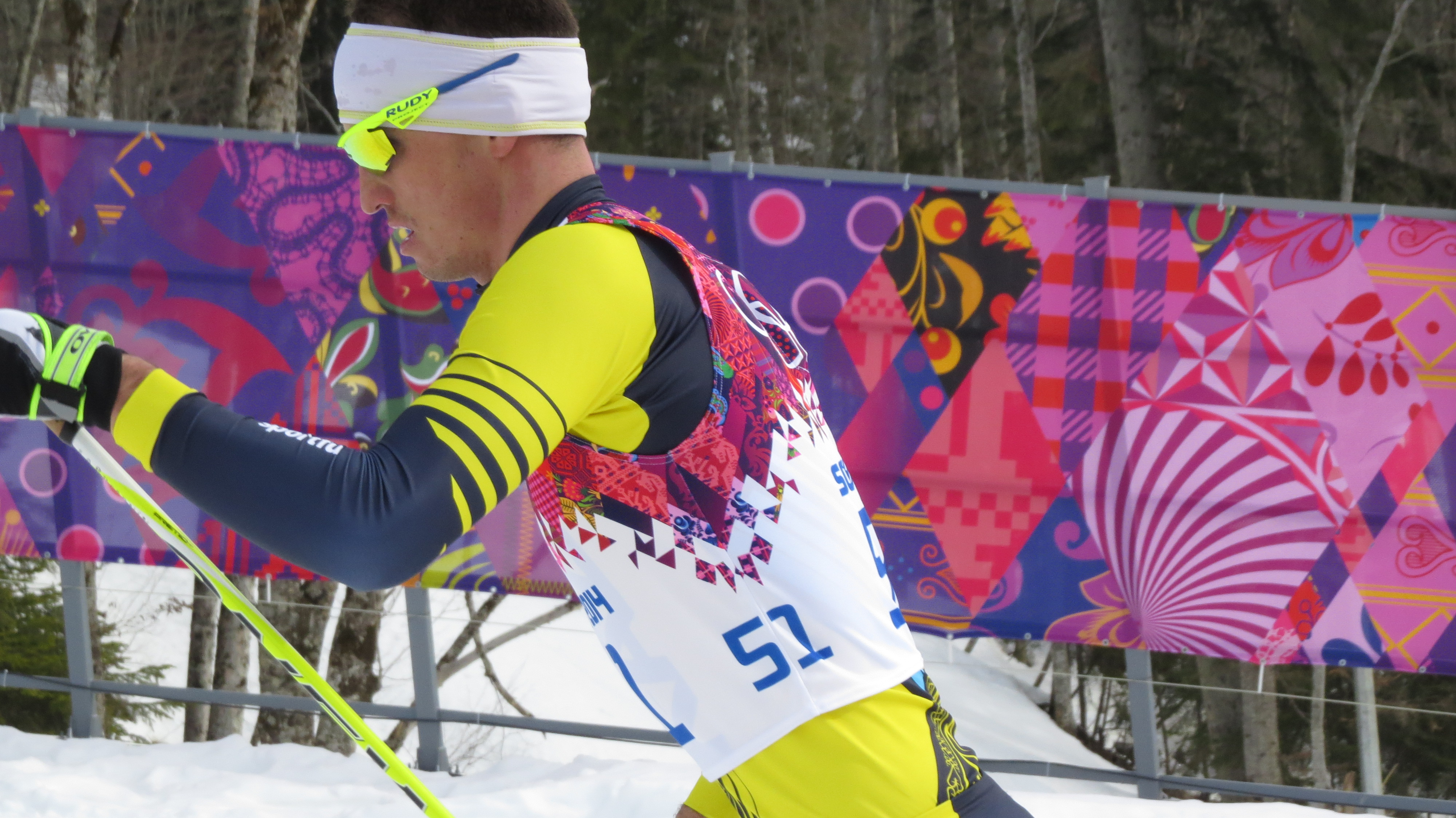
- Poltoranin at the 2014 Winter Olympics

Personal information
- Nationality: Kazakhstan
- Born: 29 April 1987 (age 39) Leninogorsk, Kazakh SSR, Soviet Union
- Height: 1.86 m (6 ft 1 in)

Sport
- Sport: Skiing

World Cup career
- Seasons: 14 – (2005, 2007–2019)
- Indiv. starts: 184
- Indiv. podiums: 27
- Indiv. wins: 11
- Team starts: 20
- Team podiums: 1
- Team wins: 0
- Overall titles: 0 – (4th in 2013)
- Discipline titles: 0
Medal record
Men's cross-country skiing
Representing Kazakhstan
World Championships
Bronze medal – third place	2013 Val di Flemme	Team sprint
Bronze medal – third place	2013 Val di Flemme	50 km classical
U23 World Championships
Silver medal – second place	2008 Mals	15 km classical
Silver medal – second place	2009 Praz de Lys-Sommand	15 km freestyle
Junior World Championships
Gold medal – first place	2004 Stryn	4 × 10 km relay
Silver medal – second place	2007 Tarvisio	10 km freestyle
Asian Winter Games
Gold medal – first place	2011 Astana-Almaty	Individual sprint
Gold medal – first place	2011 Astana-Almaty	Team sprint
Gold medal – first place	2011 Astana-Almaty	30 km pursuit
Gold medal – first place	2011 Astana-Almaty	4 × 10 km relay
Silver medal – second place	2007 Changchun	Individual sprint
Bronze medal – third place	2011 Astana-Almaty	10 km classical
- Updated on 20 November 2021

Alexey Yurevich Poltoranin (Kazakh: Алексей Юрьевич Полтаранин, born 29 April 1987) is a Kazakh cross-country skier who has competed at the international senior level since 2004. He has three World Cup wins, one in 2010 and two in 2013. In the 2013 World Championship in Val di Fiemme he won two bronze medals. Most of his best results are in the classic technique.

At the FIS Nordic World Ski Championships 2019 Poltoranin was one of five athletes caught doping by Bundeskriminalamt in a police raid in Seefeld, Austria. He was arrested before the start of the 15 kilometre classical race. He admitted to using blood doping.

His wife is biathlete Olga Poltoranina.

== Athletic career ==
=== World Championships and Olympics ===
Poltoranin competed at the 2006 and 2010 Winter Olympics, the World Ski Championships in 2007, 2009, 2011 and 2013.

Poltoranin finished fifth in both the individual and team sprint at the 2010 Winter Olympics in Vancouver.

In the 2013 World Championship in Val di Fiemme, Poltoranin won two bronze medals. On the first day, Poltoranin competed in the classic sprint where he qualified to the semifinals, but he broke his ski poles at the start. On the next day, Alexey Poltoranin and Nikolay Chebotko won bronze at the men's team sprint. On the last day of the championship, he took bronze in the men's 50 km classic and finished after Johan Olsson and Dario Cologna. His other World Championship results include sixth in the team sprint in 2011 and seventh places at the 4×10 km relay in 2007 and the team sprint in 2009.

=== World Cup ===
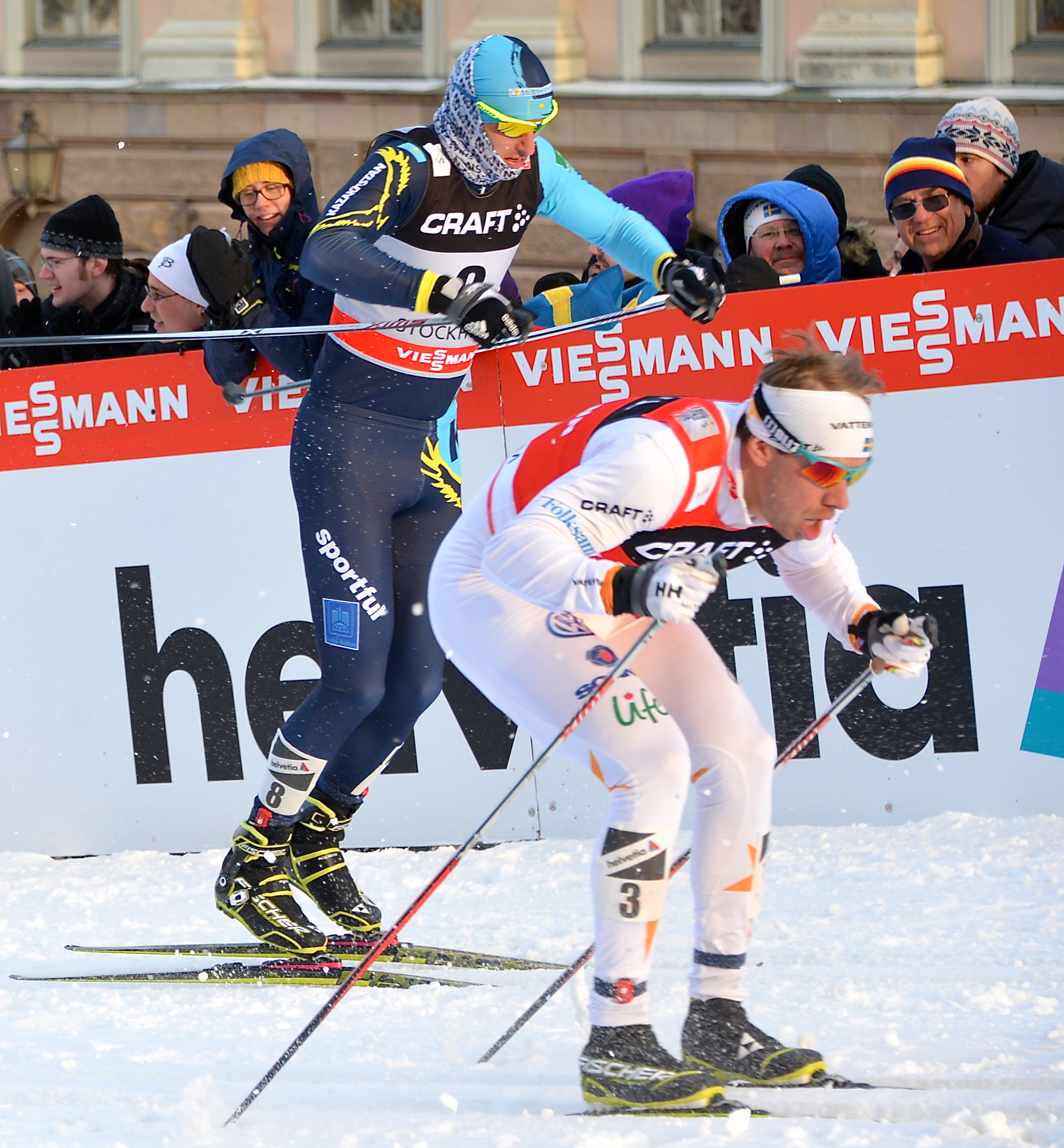
Poltoranin and Emil Jönsson at Royal Palace Sprint in Stockholm. 20 March 2013

The 2004/05 season was Alexey Poltoranin's first in the World Cup. First World Cup stage, where he competed, was 4 × 10 km relay in Gällivare in 2004, however he competed only in two races this season. Poltoranin claimed his first World Cup victory at the 15 kilometer classic race at Davos in 2010 and took that victory ahead of Alexander Legkov and Lukáš Bauer. For Kazakhstan, the victory of Poltoranin was the first win since March 1998 when Vladimir Smirnov won the 30 km in Lahti. In the 2011–12 season, he made only one victory, when he won Nordic Opening's 15 km classical handicap in Kuusamo. On 17 December 2011 he placed third at 15 kilometer classic in Rogla.

The 2013–14 season was more successful for Poltoranin, than previous years. He began his world cup run on 11 November 2012 in Gällivare, where he reached his first season podium, finishing second in 15 km freestyle race. On 2 December 2012 he took third at Nordic Opening's 15 km classical handicap start in Kuusamo crossing the line 3.4 seconds behind Petter Northug. He finished Nordic Opening 3rd overall. Poltoranin won his first ever Tour de Ski stage in the 5 km classic individual in Toblach as Petter Northug finished second to maintain his overall lead. He also won stage 6 in Val di Fiemme and finished 11th overall in general classification. On 19 January 2013 Poltoranin won the men's 15-kilometre classical-style mass start race in a sprint finish, clocking 37 minutes, 11.6 seconds to beat Russia's Alexander Bessmertnykh by .01 seconds. On 6 February 2013 he won the 1.5 k classic sprint in Davos. In the final run in Poltoranin coasted in comfortably with a time of 3:25.7, while Cologna narrowly out-sprinted Pellegrino for a second-place finish to please the home crowd. This was Poltoranin's first sprint victory on the World Cup. He placed second in last two stages of the season in Lahti and Drammen, where in both races was defeated by Petter Northug. Poltoranin finished 2012–13 World Cup season 4th overall with 995 points.

== Cross-country skiing results ==
All results are sourced from the International Ski Federation (FIS).

=== Olympic Games ===
Year	Age	15 km individual	30 km skiathlon	50 km mass start	Sprint	4 × 10 km relay	Team sprint
2006	18	39	—	—	—	—	—
2010	22	14	—	27	5	11	5
2014	26	9	15	—	—	—	8
2018	30	—	—	15	17	8	15

=== World Championships ===
- 2 medals – (2 bronze)

Year	Age	15 km individual	30 km skiathlon	50 km mass start	Sprint	4 × 10 km relay	Team sprint
2007	19	—	32	—	17	7	—
2009	21	16	49	—	45	10	7
2011	23	31	—	—	—	13	6
2013	25	—	—	Bronze	11	13	Bronze
2015	27	—	21	7	35	13	—
2017	29	7	—	—	—	9	17
2019	31	DNS	11	—	—	—	—

=== World Cup ===
==== Season standings ====
Season	Age	Discipline standings			Ski Tour standings			
Season	Age	Overall	Distance	Sprint	Nordic Opening	Tour de Ski	World Cup Final	Ski Tour Canada
2005	17	NC	NC	—	—N/a	—N/a	—N/a	—N/a
2007	19	150	99	—	—N/a	—	—N/a	—N/a
2008	20	107	63	NC	—N/a	45	43	—N/a
2009	21	82	52	109	—N/a	—	—	—N/a
2010	22	69	54	57	—N/a	—	—	—N/a
2011	23	34	31	34	15	—	—	—N/a
2012	24	26	22	42	4	—	39	—N/a
2013	25	4	4	6	3rd place, bronze medalist(s)	11	DNF	—N/a
2014	26	12	6	18	18	DNF	DNF	—N/a
2015	27	8	7	70	11	7	—N/a	—N/a
2016	28	11	16	33	19	5	—N/a	12
2017	29	72	49	74	—	—	—	—N/a
2018	30	7	6	63	11	4	DNF	—N/a
2019	31	54	31	NC	36	DNF	—	—N/a

==== Individual podiums ====
- 11 victories – (4 WC, 7 SWC)
- 27 podiums – (14 WC, 13 SWC)

No.	Season	Date	Location	Race	Level	Place
1	2010–11	26 November 2010	Rukatunturi, Finland	1.4 km Sprint C	Stage World Cup	2nd
2	2010–11	11 December 2010	Davos, Switzerland	15 km Individual C	World Cup	1st
3	2011–12	27 November 2011	Rukatunturi, Finland	15 km Pursuit C	Stage World Cup	1st
4	2011–12	17 December 2011	Rogla, Slovenia	15 km Mass Start C	World Cup	3rd
5	2012–13	24 November 2012	Gällivare, Sweden	15 km Individual F	World Cup	2nd
6	2012–13	30 November – 2 December 2012	(Finland) Nordic Opening	Overall Standings	World Cup	3rd
7	2012–13	4 January 2013	Toblach, Italy	5 km Individual C	Stage World Cup	1st
8	2012–13	5 January 2013	Val di Fiemme, Italy	15 km Mass Start C	Stage World Cup	1st
9	2012–13	19 January 2013	La Clusaz, France	15 km Mass Start C	World Cup	1st
10	2012–13	16 February 2013	Davos, Switzerland	1.5 km Sprint C	World Cup	1st
11	2012–13	10 March 2013	Lahti, Finland	15 km Individual C	World Cup	2nd
12	2012–13	13 March 2013	Drammen, Norway	1.3 km Sprint C	World Cup	2nd
13	2013–14	7 December 2013	Lillehammer, Norway	15 km Individual C	World Cup	2nd
14	2013–14	21 December 2013	Asiago, Italy	1.65 km Sprint C	World Cup	2nd
15	2013–14	1 January 2014	Lenzerheide, Switzerland	15 km Mass Start C	Stage World Cup	1st
16	2013–14	19 January 2014	Szklarska Poręba, Poland	15 km Mass Start C	World Cup	3rd
17	2014–15	7 December 2014	Lillehammer, Norway	15 km Pursuit C	Stage World Cup	2nd
18	2014–15	7 January 2015	Toblach, Italy	10 km Individual C	Stage World Cup	1st
19	2014–15	10 January 2015	Val di Fiemme, Italy	15 km Mass Start C	Stage World Cup	2nd
20	2014–15	8 March 2015	Lahti, Finland	15 km Individual C	World Cup	2nd
21	2015–16	5 January 2016	Oberstdorf, Germany	1.2 km Sprint C	Stage World Cup	3rd
22	2015–16	6 January 2016	Oberstdorf, Germany	15 km Mass Start C	Stage World Cup	1st
23	2015–16	9 January 2016	Val di Fiemme, Italy	15 km Mass Start C	Stage World Cup	3rd
24	2017–18	17 December 2017	Toblach, Italy	15 km Pursuit C	World Cup	3rd
25	2017–18	31 December 2017	Lenzerheide, Switzerland	15 km Individual C	Stage World Cup	2nd
26	2017–18	6 January 2018	Val di Fiemme, Italy	15 km Mass Start C	Stage World Cup	1st
27	2017–18	21 January 2018	Planica, Slovenia	15 km Individual C	World Cup	1st

==== Team podiums ====
- 1 podium – (1 TS)

No.	Season	Date	Location	Race	Level	Place	Teammate
1	2013–14	22 December 2013	Asiago, Italy	6 × 1.65 km Team Sprint C	World Cup	2nd	Chebotko

== Other career highlights ==
Asian Winter Games
2007 – (China) Changchun (silver) 2nd, freestyle sprint
2011 – (Kazakhstan) Almaty (gold) 1st, classical sprint
2011 – (Kazakhstan) Almaty (gold) 1st, team freestyle sprint (with Chebotko)
2011 – (Kazakhstan) Almaty (bronze) 3rd, 10 km classical individual
2011 – (Kazakhstan) Almaty (gold) 1st, 30 km classical mass start
2011 – (Kazakhstan) Almaty (gold) 1st, 4 × 10 km relay (with Cherepanov / Chebotko / Velichko)

== See also ==
- FIS Nordic World Ski Championships 2013
