= FIS Nordic World Ski Championships 2017 – Men's 15 kilometre classical =

Men's 15 kilometre classical at the FIS Nordic World Ski Championships 2017
- Location: Lahti, Finland
- Date: 1 March
- Competitors: 88 from 37 nations
- Winning time: 36:44.0

Medalists
| gold medal | Iivo Niskanen | Finland |
| silver medal | Martin Johnsrud Sundby | Norway |
| bronze medal | Niklas Dyrhaug | Norway |

The Men's 15 kilometre classical event of the FIS Nordic World Ski Championships 2017 was held on 1 March 2017. A 10 kilometre classical qualification competition was held on 22 February 2017 for those participants that do not have enough FIS points to qualify automatically to other distances in the World Ski Championships.

== Results ==
=== Qualification ===
The race was held on 22 February 2017.

| Rank | Bib | Athlete | Country | Time | Deficit | Notes |
|---|---|---|---|---|---|---|
| 1 | 64 | Krešimir Crnković | Croatia | 26:21.5 | | Q |
| 2 | 63 | Deividas Kliševičius | Lithuania | 27:17.1 | +55.6 | Q |
| 3 | 66 | Batmönkhiin Achbadrakh | Mongolia | 27:27.0 | +1:05.5 | Q |
| 4 | 54 | Sattar Seid | Iran | 27:41.5 | +1:20.0 | Q |
| 5 | 49 | Jens Hulgaard | Denmark | 27:41.6 | +1:20.1 | Q |
| 5 | 53 | Thibaut De Marre | Belgium | 27:41.6 | +1:20.1 | Q |
| 7 | 41 | Tue Roemer | Denmark | 27:45.6 | +1:24.1 | Q |
| 8 | 57 | James Clugnet | Great Britain | 27:46.5 | +1:25.0 | Q |
| 9 | 65 | Ömer Ayçiçek | Turkey | 27:57.3 | +1:35.8 | Q |
| 10 | 60 | Apostolos Angelis | Greece | 27:58.5 | +1:37.0 | Q |
| 11 | 61 | Tadevos Poghosyan | Armenia | 28:01.5 | +1:40.0 | |
| 12 | 50 | Ąžuolas Bajoravičius | Lithuania | 28:03.8 | +1:42.3 | |
| 13 | 51 | Sævar Birgisson | Iceland | 28:05.6 | +1:44.1 | |
| 14 | 59 | Simeon Ognyanov | Bulgaria | 28:16.1 | +1:54.6 | |
| 15 | 62 | Amed Oğlağo | Turkey | 28:30.7 | +2:09.2 | |
| 16 | 56 | Nikolay Viyachev | Bulgaria | 28:37.4 | +2:15.9 | |
| 17 | 55 | Marko Skender | Croatia | 28:37.8 | +2:16.3 | |
| 18 | 47 | Albert Jónsson | Iceland | 28:38.8 | +2:17.3 | |
| 19 | 67 | Baasansürengiin Amarsanaa | Mongolia | 28:42.7 | +2:21.2 | |
| 20 | 52 | Nick Montgomery | Australia | 29:00.5 | +2:39.0 | |
| 21 | 43 | Kristóf Lágler | Hungary | 29:11.7 | +2:50.2 | |
| 22 | 27 | Mantas Strolia | Lithuania | 29:18.9 | +2:57.4 | |
| 23 | 48 | Brynjar Kristinsson | Iceland | 29:24.3 | +3:02.8 | |
| 24 | 38 | Deimantas Kliševičius | Lithuania | 29:35.0 | +3:13.5 | |
| 25 | 46 | Georgios Nakas | Greece | 29:43.4 | +3:21.9 | |
| 26 | 58 | Martin Penchev | Bulgaria | 29:49.3 | +3:27.8 | |
| 27 | 5 | Thierry Langer | Belgium | 29:50.1 | +3:28.6 | |
| 28 | 6 | Stephan Langer | Belgium | 29:51.8 | +3:30.3 | |
| 29 | 37 | Lyubomir Paparkov | Bulgaria | 30:07.2 | +3:45.7 | |
| 30 | 40 | Jakov Hladika | Croatia | 30:07.6 | +3:46.1 | |
| 31 | 42 | Jānis Šņoriņš | Latvia | 30:14.4 | +3:52.9 | |
| 32 | 33 | Soma Gyallai | Hungary | 30:15.1 | +3:53.6 | |
| 33 | 13 | Carlos Lannes | Argentina | 30:34.7 | +4:13.2 | |
| 34 | 44 | Ingmārs Briedis | Latvia | 30:38.1 | +4:16.6 | |
| 35 | 17 | Jan Rossiter | Ireland | 31:02.7 | +4:41.2 | |
| 36 | 29 | Alireza Maghdid | Iran | 31:43.8 | +5:22.3 | |
| 37 | 30 | Yasin Shemshaki | Iran | 31:44.9 | +5:23.4 | |
| 38 | 34 | Leandro Lutz | Brazil | 32:53.5 | +6:32.0 | |
| 39 | 3 | Liviu Dubalari | Moldova | 32:57.8 | +6:36.3 | |
| 40 | 8 | Nicolae Gaiduc | Moldova | 33:02.5 | +6:41.0 | |
| 41 | 45 | Yonathan Jesús Fernández | Chile | 33:09.5 | +6:48.0 | |
| 42 | 31 | Ádám Büki | Hungary | 33:15.5 | +6:54.0 | |
| 43 | 28 | Cristian Bocancea | Moldova | 33:18.2 | +6:56.7 | |
| 44 | 24 | Domonkos Kovács | Hungary | 33:56.8 | +7:35.3 | |
| 45 | 32 | Juan Agurto | Chile | 33:58.0 | +7:36.5 | |
| 46 | 39 | Victor Santos | Brazil | 34:19.7 | +7:58.2 | |
| 47 | 4 | Nikolai Matveev | Kyrgyzstan | 35:33.7 | +9:12.2 | |
| 48 | 22 | Klaus Jungbluth | Ecuador | 36:47.0 | +10:25.5 | |
| 49 | 21 | Brian Kennedy | Ireland | 37:44.1 | +11:22.6 | |
| 50 | 12 | Dominic McAleenan | Ireland | 39:21.6 | +13:00.1 | |
| 51 | 25 | Mark Rajack | Trinidad and Tobago | 39:40.8 | +13:19.3 | |
| 52 | 2 | Bernardo Baena | Venezuela | 39:58.6 | +13:37.1 | |
| 53 | 14 | Cesar Baena | Venezuela | 40:06.5 | +13:45.0 | |
| 54 | 18 | Jhon Acevedo | Colombia | 40:28.9 | +14:07.4 | |
| 55 | 20 | Shiva Kumar | India | 41:28.9 | +15:07.4 | |
| 56 | 16 | José Calle | Ecuador | 41:38.7 | +15:17.2 | |
| 57 | 10 | Mansour Bazouni | Lebanon | 42:54.8 | +16:33.3 | |
| 58 | 7 | Anthony Tawk | Lebanon | 45:00.3 | +18:38.8 | |
| 59 | 11 | Paul Bragiel | Colombia | 46:07.8 | +19:46.3 | |
| — | 1 | Adrián Solano | Venezuela | DNF | | |
| — | 9 | Sveatoslav Maliutin | Moldova | DNF | | |
| — | 35 | Yaghoub Kiashemshaki | Iran | DNF | | |
| — | 15 | Veljko Grbović | Montenegro | DNS | | |
| — | 19 | Mirko Bulatović | Montenegro | DNS | | |
| — | 26 | Miljan Radulović | Montenegro | DNS | | |
| — | 36 | Gints Lūsis | Latvia | DNS | | |
| — | 23 | Stephen O'Mara | Ireland | DSQ | | |

=== Final ===
The final was started at 13:45.

| Rank | Bib | Athlete | Country | Time | Deficit |
|---|---|---|---|---|---|
| 1st place, gold medalist(s) | 64 | Iivo Niskanen | Finland | 36:44.0 | |
| 2nd place, silver medalist(s) | 70 | Martin Johnsrud Sundby | Norway | 37:01.9 | +17.9 |
| 3rd place, bronze medalist(s) | 66 | Niklas Dyrhaug | Norway | 37:15.3 | +31.3 |
| 4 | 60 | Alexander Bessmertnykh | Russia | 37:25.8 | +41.8 |
| 5 | 42 | Didrik Tønseth | Norway | 37:37.2 | +53.2 |
| 5 | 46 | Andrey Larkov | Russia | 37:37.2 | +53.2 |
| 7 | 29 | Alexey Poltoranin | Kazakhstan | 37:50.3 | +1:06.3 |
| 8 | 38 | Sami Jauhojärvi | Finland | 37:53.7 | +1:09.7 |
| 9 | 52 | Johan Olsson | Sweden | 37:54.6 | +1:10.6 |
| 10 | 44 | Calle Halfvarsson | Sweden | 37:59.0 | +1:15.0 |
| 11 | 68 | Matti Heikkinen | Finland | 38:00.4 | +1:16.4 |
| 12 | 50 | Andrew Musgrave | Great Britain | 38:11.4 | +1:27.4 |
| 13 | 54 | Daniel Rickardsson | Sweden | 38:13.9 | +1:29.9 |
| 14 | 58 | Jens Burman | Sweden | 38:20.1 | +1:36.1 |
| 15 | 39 | Johannes Høsflot Klæbo | Norway | 38:22.7 | +1:38.7 |
| 16 | 18 | Emil Jönsson | Sweden | 38:27.5 | +1:43.5 |
| 17 | 33 | Jonas Baumann | Switzerland | 38:36.4 | +1:52.4 |
| 18 | 26 | Erik Bjornsen | United States | 38:40.7 | +1:56.7 |
| 19 | 30 | Lukáš Bauer | Czech Republic | 38:47.2 | +2:03.2 |
| 20 | 40 | Sergey Turyshev | Russia | 38:50.3 | +2:06.3 |
| 21 | 27 | Giandomenico Salvadori | Italy | 38:51.1 | +2:07.1 |
| 22 | 28 | Stanislav Volzhentsev | Russia | 39:03.1 | +2:19.1 |
| 23 | 62 | Maurice Manificat | France | 39:03.4 | +2:19.4 |
| 24 | 32 | Dietmar Nöckler | Italy | 39:05.4 | +2:21.4 |
| 24 | 48 | Lari Lehtonen | Finland | 39:05.4 | +2:21.4 |
| 26 | 13 | Algo Kärp | Estonia | 39:15.3 | +2:31.3 |
| 27 | 31 | Jonas Dobler | Germany | 39:15.8 | +2:31.8 |
| 28 | 34 | Martin Jakš | Czech Republic | 39:16.6 | +2:32.6 |
| 29 | 21 | Irineu Esteve Altimiras | Andorra | 39:28.4 | +2:44.4 |
| 30 | 12 | Philipp Haelg | Liechtenstein | 39:34.8 | +2:50.8 |
| 31 | 37 | Lucas Bögl | Germany | 39:36.9 | +2:52.9 |
| 32 | 1 | Aivar Rehemaa | Estonia | 39:54.2 | +3:10.2 |
| 33 | 20 | Kyle Bratrud | United States | 39:55.5 | +3:11.5 |
| 34 | 14 | Raido Ränkel | Estonia | 40:00.5 | +3:16.5 |
| 35 | 36 | Devon Kershaw | Canada | 40:08.8 | +3:24.8 |
| 36 | 5 | Andreas Veerpalu | Estonia | 40:09.7 | +3:25.7 |
| 37 | 63 | Luis Stadlober | Austria | 40:18.3 | +3:34.3 |
| 38 | 8 | Petr Knop | Czech Republic | 40:23.2 | +3:39.2 |
| 39 | 25 | Hiroyuki Miyazawa | Japan | 40:24.0 | +3:40.0 |
| 40 | 56 | Francesco De Fabiani | Italy | 40:24.7 | +3:40.7 |
| 41 | 11 | Denis Volotka | Kazakhstan | 40:26.4 | +3:42.4 |
| 41 | 16 | Dominik Bury | Poland | 40:26.4 | +3:42.4 |
| 43 | 17 | Snorri Einarsson | Iceland | 40:30.2 | +3:46.2 |
| 44 | 22 | Alexis Jeannerod | France | 40:30.9 | +3:46.9 |
| 45 | 35 | Thomas Bing | Germany | 40:36.0 | +3:52.0 |
| 46 | 10 | Andrew Young | Great Britain | 40:44.6 | +4:00.6 |
| 47 | 15 | Vitaliy Pukhkalo | Kazakhstan | 40:50.2 | +4:06.2 |
| 48 | 24 | Veselin Tzinzov | Bulgaria | 41:02.2 | +4:18.2 |
| 49 | 53 | Thomas Hjalmar Westgård | Ireland | 41:03.2 | +4:19.2 |
| 50 | 43 | Andrew Newell | United States | 41:05.7 | +4:21.7 |
| 51 | 9 | Miroslav Rypl | Czech Republic | 41:15.6 | +4:31.6 |
| 52 | 7 | Sergey Mikayelyan | Armenia | 41:20.5 | +4:36.5 |
| 53 | 61 | Niklas Liederer | Austria | 41:33.3 | +4:49.3 |
| 54 | 2 | Ivan Lyuft | Kazakhstan | 41:38.2 | +4:54.2 |
| 55 | 19 | Benjamin Lustgarten | United States | 41:40.9 | +4:56.9 |
| 56 | 65 | Knute Johnsgaard | Canada | 41:44.7 | +5:00.7 |
| 57 | 47 | Callum Smith | Great Britain | 41:47.4 | +5:03.4 |
| 58 | 6 | Oleksiy Krasovsky | Ukraine | 41:50.6 | +5:06.6 |
| 59 | 69 | Andriy Orlyk | Ukraine | 42:07.1 | +5:23.1 |
| 60 | 73 | Phillip Bellingham | Australia | 42:22.3 | +5:38.3 |
| 61 | 72 | Ádám Kónya | Hungary | 42:30.8 | +5:46.8 |
| 62 | 89 | Paul Kovacs | Australia | 42:43.9 | +5:59.9 |
| 63 | 74 | Paweł Klisz | Poland | 42:59.0 | +6:15.0 |
| 64 | 57 | Indulis Bikše | Latvia | 43:03.6 | +6:19.6 |
| 65 | 67 | Jesse Cockney | Canada | 43:04.7 | +6:20.7 |
| 66 | 75 | Andrej Segeč | Slovakia | 43:11.5 | +6:27.5 |
| 67 | 83 | James Clugnet | Great Britain | 43:39.7 | +6:55.7 |
| 68 | 4 | Edi Dadić | Croatia | 44:01.6 | +7:17.6 |
| 69 | 45 | Raul Popa | Romania | 44:04.1 | +7:20.1 |
| 70 | 82 | Lasse Hulgaard | Denmark | 44:18.0 | +7:34.0 |
| 71 | 79 | Deividas Kliševičius | Lithuania | 44:19.3 | +7:35.3 |
| 72 | 86 | Thibaut De Marre | Belgium | 44:36.8 | +7:52.8 |
| 73 | 81 | Yordan Chuchuganov | Bulgaria | 44:38.3 | +7:54.3 |
| 74 | 59 | Alin Cioanca | Romania | 45:08.2 | +8:24.2 |
| 75 | 80 | Tautvydas Strolia | Lithuania | 45:16.3 | +8:32.3 |
| 76 | 88 | Tue Roemer | Denmark | 45:29.7 | +8:45.7 |
| 77 | 55 | Ruslan Perekhoda | Ukraine | 45:32.9 | +8:48.9 |
| 78 | 85 | Sattar Seid | Iran | 45:33.5 | +8:49.5 |
| 79 | 51 | Oleg Yoltukhovskyy | Ukraine | 45:38.2 | +8:54.2 |
| 80 | 71 | Hamza Dursun | Turkey | 45:41.4 | +8:57.4 |
| 81 | 76 | Lukas Jakeliūnas | Lithuania | 46:06.4 | +9:22.4 |
| 82 | 87 | Jens Hulgaard | Denmark | 46:45.8 | +10:01.8 |
| 83 | 84 | Batmönkhiin Achbadrakh | Mongolia | 50:06.4 | +13:22.4 |
| — | 23 | Michail Semenov | Belarus | DNF | |
| — | 41 | Stepan Terentjev | Lithuania | DNF | |
| — | 49 | Maciej Staręga | Poland | DNF | |
| — | 78 | Ömer Ayçiçek | Turkey | DNF | |
| — | 77 | Martin Møller | Denmark | DNS | |
| — | 3 | Jan Antolec | Poland | DSQ | |
