= Stadlober =

Stadlober is a surname. Notable people with the surname include:

- Alois Stadlober (born 1962), Austrian cross-country skier
- Luis Stadlober (born 1991), Austrian cross-country skier
- Robert Stadlober (born 1982), Austrian actor and musician
- Teresa Stadlober (born 1993), Austrian cross-country skier
