= Sergey Cherepanov =

Kazakhstani cross country skier (born 1986)

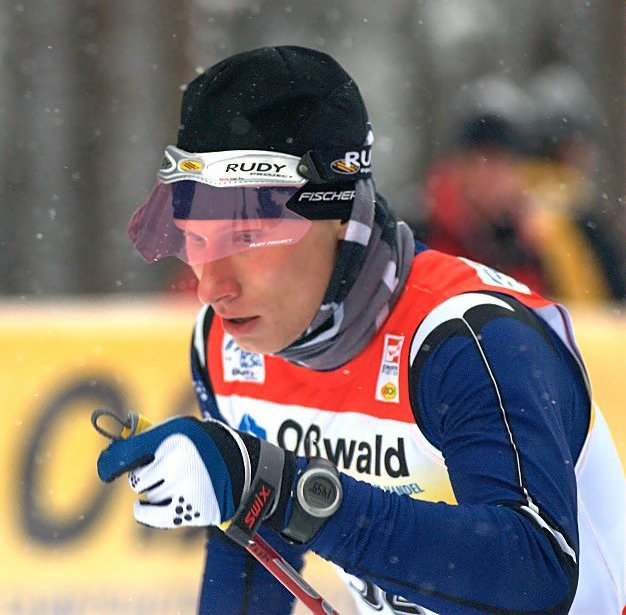
- Sergey Cherepanov at the Tour de Ski 2010

Personal information
- Born: January 25, 1986 (age 40) Ridder, Kazakh SSR, USSR

Sport
- Sport: Skiing

World Cup career
- Seasons: 2004–
Medal record
Men's cross-country skiing
Representing Kazakhstan
Asian Winter Games
Gold medal – first place	2007 Changchun	4×10 km relay
Gold medal – first place	2011 Astana-Almaty	4×10 km relay
Silver medal – second place	2011 Astana-Almaty	30 km
Universiade
Bronze medal – third place	2007 Pragelato	10 km

Sergey Cherepanov (Russian: Серге́й Черепанов) (born January 25, 1986, in Ridder) is a Kazakhstani cross-country skier who has competed since 2001. His best World Cup finish was third in a 15 km event in Finland in 2008.

At the 2006 Winter Olympics in Turin, Cherepanov finished 55th in the sprint event. His best finish at the FIS Nordic World Ski Championships was tenth in the 4 x 10 km relay at Liberec in 2009.

He finished 11th in the 4 x 10 km relay at the 2010 Winter Olympics in Vancouver.

== Career highlights ==
FIS Nordic Under 23 World Ski Championships Medals
2009 – (France) Praz de Lys Sommand (gold) 1st, 15 km freestyle

Universiade
2007 – (Italy) Pragelato (bronze) 3rd, 10 km freestyle

Asian Winter Games
2007 – (China) Changchun (gold) 1st, 4×10 km relay
2011 – (Kazakhstan) Almaty (gold) 1st, 4×10 km relay (with Chebotko / Poltoranin / Velichko)
2011 – (Kazakhstan) Almaty (silver) 2nd, 30 km classical

World Cup podiums
2008 – (Finland) Lahti (bronze) 3rd, 15 km classical
