= Nikolay Chebotko =

Kazakhstani cross country skier (1982–2021)

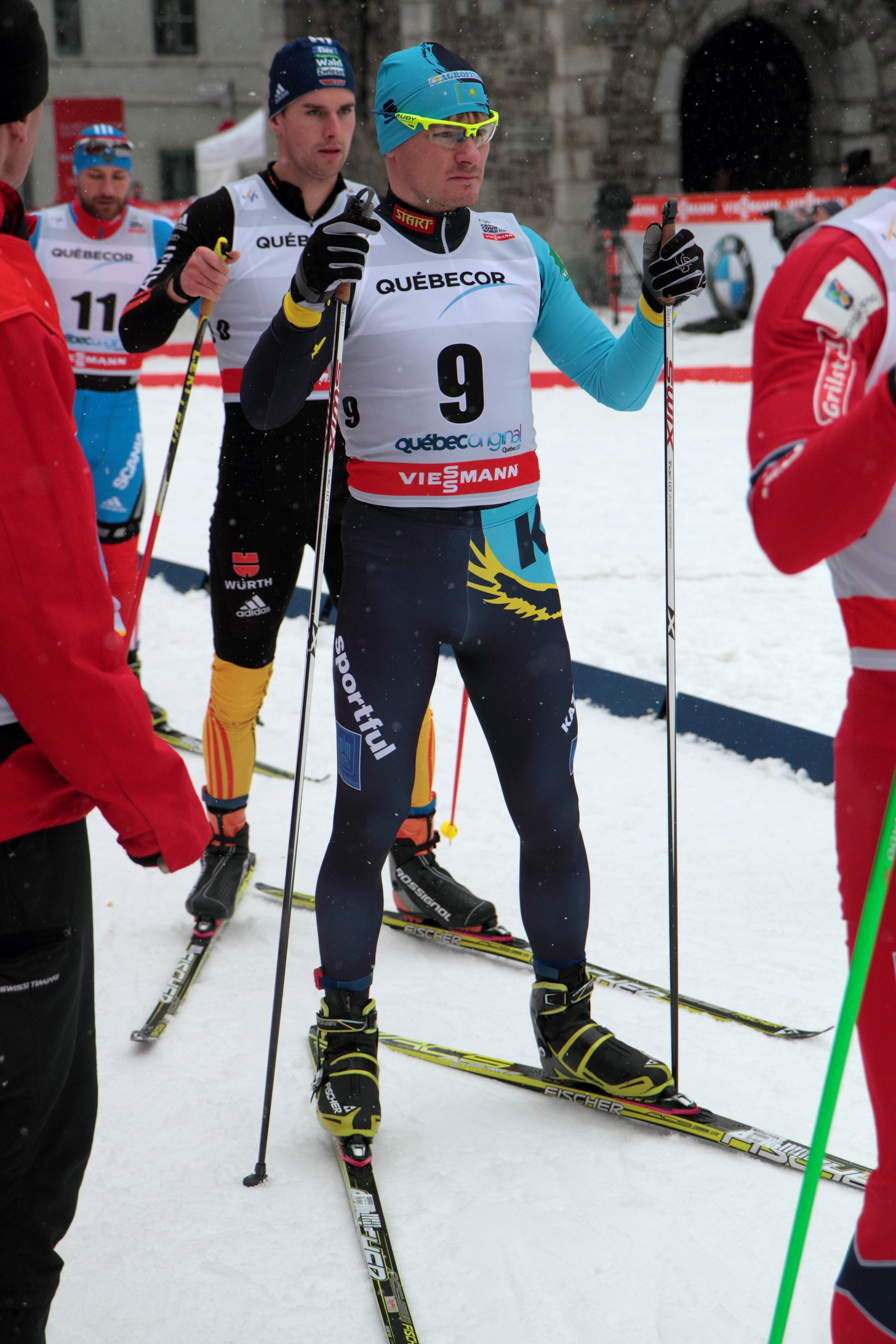

Personal information
- Born: 25 October 1982 Schuchinsk, Kokchetav Oblast, Kazakh SSR, USSR
- Died: 24 January 2021 (aged 38) Burabay District, Kazakhstan

Sport
- Sport: Skiing

World Cup career
- Seasons: 2001–2019
Medal record
Men's cross-country skiing
Representing Kazakhstan
World Championships
Bronze medal – third place	2013 Val di Flemme	Team sprint
Asian Games
Gold medal – first place	2007 Changchun	4×10 km relay
Gold medal – first place	2011 Astana-Almaty	Team sprint
Gold medal – first place	2011 Astana-Almaty	4×10 km relay
Silver medal – second place	2003 Aomori	4×10 km relay
Silver medal – second place	2011 Astana-Almaty	Sprint
Silver medal – second place	2011 Astana-Almaty	10 km
Bronze medal – third place	2011 Astana-Almaty	15 km
Universiade
Gold medal – first place	2003 Tarvisio	Sprint
Gold medal – first place	2007 Pragelato	Sprint
Silver medal – second place	2005 Innsbruck	10 km

Nikolay Sergeyevich Chebotko (Russian: Николай Сергеевич Чеботько, 25 October 1982 – 24 January 2021) was a Kazakhstani cross-country skier who competed from 2000, until his death. His best individual World Cup finish was fourth in a sprint event in Finland in 2013.

Chebotko also competed in four Winter Olympics, earning his best finish of fifth in the team sprint event at Vancouver in 2010. His best finish at the FIS Nordic World Ski Championships is bronze medal at Team sprint 2013.

Chebotko died in a car accident near Borovoye on 24 January 2021.

== Career highlights ==
FIS Nordic World Ski Championships Medals
2013 – (Italy) Val di Fiemme (bronze) 3rd, team freestyle sprint (with Poltoranin)

Universiade
2003 – (Italy) Tarvisio (gold) 1st, freestyle sprint
2005 – (Austria) Innsbruck/Seefeld (silver) 2nd, 10 km freestyle
2007 – (Italy) Pragelato (gold) 1st, freestyle sprint

Asian Winter Games
2003 – (Japan) Aomori (silver) 2nd, 4×10 km relay
2007 – (China) Changchun (gold) 1st, 4×10 km relay
2011 – (Kazakhstan) Almaty (gold) 1st, team freestyle sprint (with Poltoranin)
2011 – (Kazakhstan) Almaty (gold) 1st, 4×10 km relay (with Cherepanov / Poltoranin / Velichko)
2011 – (Kazakhstan) Almaty (silver) 2nd, classical sprint
2011 – (Kazakhstan) Almaty (silver) 2nd, 10 km classical individual
2011 – (Kazakhstan) Almaty (bronze) 3rd, 15 km freestyle

World Cup podiums
2013 – (Canada) Quebec (gold) 1st, team freestyle sprint (with Volotka)
2013 – (Italy) Asiago (silver) 2nd, team classical sprint (with Poltoranin)

Stage World Cup podiums
2008 – (Italy) Asiago (silver) 2nd, freestyle sprint (Tour de Ski)
2008 – (Czech Republic) Nove Mesto (bronze) 3rd, 15 km classical (Tour de Ski)
2009 – (Italy) Val di Fiemme (bronze) 3rd, 20 km classical mass start (Tour de Ski)
