= Cross-country skiing at the 2011 Asian Winter Games – Men's 10 kilometre classical =

Men's 10 kilometre classical at the 2011 Asian Winter Games
- Venue: Biathlon and Cross-Country Ski Complex
- Dates: 3 February 2011
- Competitors: 6 from 3 nations

Medalists
gold medal	Keishin Yoshida	Japan
silver medal	Nikolay Chebotko	Kazakhstan
bronze medal	Alexey Poltoranin	Kazakhstan

The men's 10 kilometre classical at the 2011 Asian Winter Games was held on February 3, 2011 at Biathlon and Cross-Country Ski Complex, Almaty.

== Schedule ==
All times are Almaty Time (UTC+06:00)

Date	Time	Event
Thursday, 3 February 2011	11:05	Final

== Results ==
Rank	Athlete	Time
1st place, gold medalist(s)	Keishin Yoshida (JPN)	29:39.2
2nd place, silver medalist(s)	Nikolay Chebotko (KAZ)	30:22.7
3rd place, bronze medalist(s)	Alexey Poltoranin (KAZ)	30:29.0
4	Kohei Shimizu (JPN)	31:29.5
5	Ha Tae-bok (KOR)	33:26.2
6	Im Yeui-gyu (KOR)	35:29.9
