= Keishin Yoshida =

Japanese cross-country skier (born 1987)

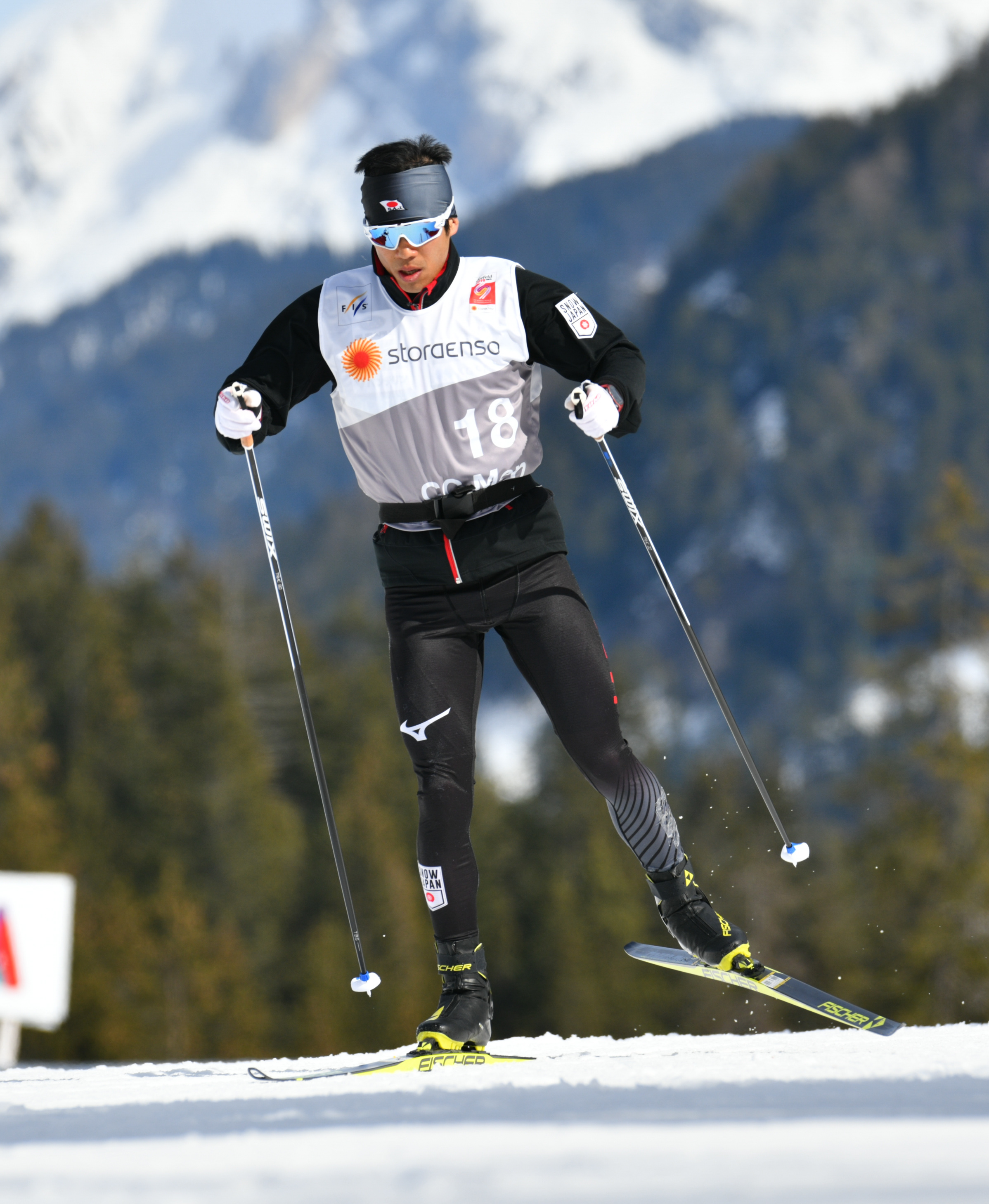
- Yoshida in 2019

Medal record

Men's cross country skiing

Representing Japan

Asian Winter Games
Gold medal – first place	2011; Astana-Almaty	10 km classical
Gold medal – first place	2011; Astana-Almaty	15 km freestyle
Silver medal – second place	2011; Astana-Almaty	4 × 10 km relay
Bronze medal – third place	2011; Astana-Almaty	30 km classical

Junior World Championships
Silver medal – second place	2005 Rovaniemi	10 km freestyle

Keishin Yoshida (吉田 圭伸, Yoshida Keishin, born 12 January 1987) is a Japanese cross-country skier.

He competed at the FIS Nordic World Ski Championships 2011 in Oslo, and placed 12th in 15 kilometre classical.

At the 2011 Asian Winter Games he won gold medals in the 10 kilometre classical event and in the 15 kilometre freestyle event.
