= Masaya Kimura =

Japanese cross-country skier (born 1986)

Medal record

Men's cross country skiing

Representing Japan

Asian Winter Games
Silver medal – second place	2011 Astana-Almaty	Team sprint
Silver medal – second place	2011 Astana-Almaty	4×10 km relay

Masaya Kimura (木村 正哉, Kimura Masaya; born 27 July 1986) is a Japanese cross-country skier.

At the 2011 Asian Winter Games he won silver medals in both the 4 x 10 kilometre relay and team sprint events.

He participated at the FIS Nordic World Ski Championships 2011 in Oslo.
