= Roman Ragozin =

Kazakhstani cross-country skier (born 1993)

Personal information
- Born: January 4, 1993 (age 33) Ridder, Kazakhstan

Sport
- Sport: Skiing

Roman Ragozin (born January 4, 1993, in Ridder) is a Kazakhstani cross-country skier.

Ragozin competed at the 2014 Winter Olympics for Kazakhstan. He placed 33rd in the qualifying round in the sprint, failing to advance to the knockout stages.

Ragozin made his World Cup debut in December 2013. As of April 2014, his best finish is a 22nd, in a freestyle sprint event at Szklarska Poreba in 2013–14. His best World Cup overall finish is 140th, in 2013–14. His best World Cup finish in a discipline is 87th, in the 2013–14 sprint.
