= Cross-country skiing at the 2011 Asian Winter Games – Men's team sprint freestyle =

Men's team sprint freestyle at the 2011 Asian Winter Games
- Venue: Biathlon and Cross-Country Ski Complex
- Dates: 1 February 2011
- Competitors: 8 from 4 nations

Medalists
gold medal	Alexey Poltoranin; Nikolay Chebotko	Kazakhstan
silver medal	Masaya Kimura; Nobu Naruse	Japan
bronze medal	Park Byung-joo; Jung Eui-myung	South Korea

The men's team sprint freestyle at the 2011 Asian Winter Games was held on February 1, 2011 at Biathlon and Cross-Country Ski Complex, Almaty.

== Schedule ==
All times are Almaty Time (UTC+06:00)

Date	Time	Event
Tuesday, 1 February 2011	11:05	Final

== Results ==
Rank	Team	Round 1/2	Round 3/4	Round 5/6	Time
1st place, gold medalist(s)	Kazakhstan (KAZ)				22:46.2
	Alexey Poltoranin	3:53.7	3:33.4	3:39.5	
	Nikolay Chebotko	3:42.0	3:34.5	4:23.1	
2nd place, silver medalist(s)	Japan (JPN)				22:59.2
	Masaya Kimura	3:53.7	3:37.3	3:54.5	
	Nobu Naruse	3:41.6	3:37.3	4:14.8	
3rd place, bronze medalist(s)	South Korea (KOR)				24:34.9
	Park Byung-joo	3:54.1	3:54.2	4:06.4	
	Jung Eui-myung	3:50.8	4:12.9	4:36.5	
4	Iran (IRI)				25:30.2
	Sattar Seid	4:00.5	4:14.3	4:28.0	
	Bijan Kangarloo	3:51.8	4:15.7	4:39.9	
