= Cross-country skiing at the 2011 Asian Winter Games – Men's 30 kilometre classical =

Men's 30 kilometre classical at the 2011 Asian Winter Games
- Venue: Biathlon and Cross-Country Ski Complex
- Dates: 6 February 2011
- Competitors: 4 from 2 nations

Medalists
gold medal	Alexey Poltoranin	Kazakhstan
silver medal	Sergey Cherepanov	Kazakhstan
bronze medal	Keishin Yoshida	Japan

The men's 30 kilometre mass start classical at the 2011 Asian Winter Games was held on February 6, 2011 at Biathlon and Cross-Country Ski Complex, Almaty.

== Schedule ==
All times are Almaty Time (UTC+06:00)

Date	Time	Event
Sunday, 6 February 2011	14:05	Final

== Results ==
Legend

- DNS — Did not start

Rank	Athlete	Time
1st place, gold medalist(s)	Alexey Poltoranin (KAZ)	1:24:49.0
2nd place, silver medalist(s)	Sergey Cherepanov (KAZ)	1:24:49.5
3rd place, bronze medalist(s)	Keishin Yoshida (JPN)	1:25:14.0
—	Kohei Shimizu (JPN)	DNS
