= Filipp Ridder =

Russian explorer (1759–1838)

Filipp Filippovich Ridder (Russian: Филипп Филиппович Риддер; 1759 in Saint Petersburg – 1838 in Riga) was a Russian explorer and mining engineer of Baltic German descent.

Ridder discovered polymetallic ores in what is now north-eastern Kazakhstan in 1784.

A town in that region, Ridder, bore Philip Ridder's name from 1786 to 1941, when it was changed to Leninogorsk; however, in 2002, the name was reverted to Ridder. The town is notable as the eastern terminus of European route E40.
