= Cross-country skiing at the 2011 Asian Winter Games – Men's 4 × 10 kilometre relay =

Men's 4 × 10 kilometre relay at the 2011 Asian Winter Games
- Venue: Biathlon and Cross-Country Ski Complex
- Dates: 5 February 2011
- Competitors: 16 from 4 nations

Medalists
gold medal	Kazakhstan; Sergey Cherepanov, Alexey Poltoranin, Nikolay Chebotko, Yevgeniy Velichko
silver medal	Japan; Kohei Shimizu, Keishin Yoshida, Masaya Kimura, Nobu Naruse
bronze medal	South Korea; Im Yeui-gyu, Ha Tae-bok, Lee Jun-gil, Park Byung-joo

The men's 4 × 10 kilometre relay at the 2011 Asian Winter Games was held on February 5, 2011, at Biathlon and Cross-Country Ski Complex, Almaty.

== Schedule ==
All times are Almaty Time (UTC+06:00)

Date	Time	Event
Saturday, 5 February 2011	14:15	Final

== Results ==
Rank	Team	Time
1st place, gold medalist(s)	Kazakhstan (KAZ)	1:54:40.9
	Sergey Cherepanov	28:15.8
	Alexey Poltoranin	25:39.0
	Nikolay Chebotko	30:10.8
	Yevgeniy Velichko	30:35.3
2nd place, silver medalist(s)	Japan (JPN)	1:57:45.6
	Kohei Shimizu	28:55.7
	Keishin Yoshida	26:29.0
	Masaya Kimura	30:37.9
	Nobu Naruse	31:43.0
3rd place, bronze medalist(s)	South Korea (KOR)	2:08:07.4
	Im Yeui-gyu	30:07.8
	Ha Tae-bok	29:08.6
	Lee Jun-gil	34:06.5
	Park Byung-joo	34:44.5
4	India (IND)	2:34:53.2
	Tashi Lundup	37:18.7
	Nadeem Iqbal	36:02.6
	Hemant Kumar	40:24.4
	Bilal Ahmed	41:07.5
