= Mark Starostin =

Kazakhstani cross-country skier (born 1990)

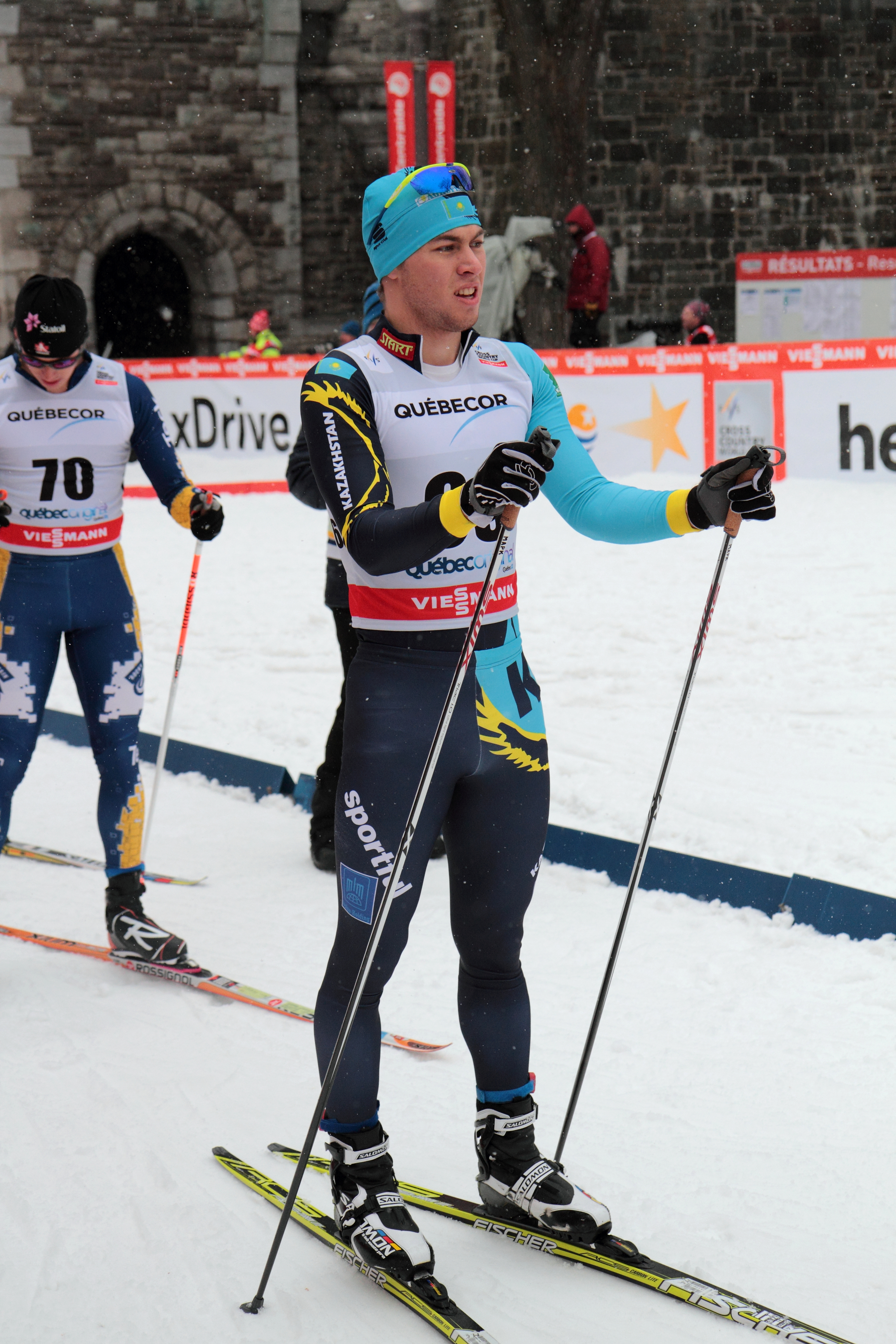

Personal information
- Full name: Mark Yurevich Starostin
- Born: December 23, 1990 (age 35) Tselinograd, Kazakh SSR, Soviet Union

Sport
- Sport: Skiing

World Cup career
- Seasons: 2012–2016
Medal record
Men's cross-country skiing
Representing Kazakhstan
U23 World Championships
Bronze medal – third place	2013 Liberec	30 km skiathlon
Junior World Championships
Bronze medal – third place	2008 Mals	4 × 5 km relay
Winter Universiade
Gold medal – first place	2013 Trentino	4 × 10 km relay
Silver medal – second place	2013 Trentino	15 km skiathlon
Silver medal – second place	2015 Štrbské Pleso	4 × 7.5 km relay

Mark Yurevich Starostin (Russian: Марк Юрьевич Старостин, born December 23, 1990) is a Kazakhstani cross-country skier who has competed since 2012 till 2016.

== Early years ==
Starostin was 3–4 years old when he tried to ski for the first time, and the first competition he took part in was opening of the winter season of Akmola Province. He studied in the 4th grade then. Starostin trained at the Specialized school of perfect sport mastery of Astana. He became a professional under coaching his father, Yuri, who is honored sportsmen of the Soviet Union.
