= Lee Jun-gil =

South Korean cross-country skier

Medal record

Men's cross country skiing

Representing South Korea

Asian Games
Bronze medal – third place	2011 Astana-Almaty	4×10 km relay

Lee Jun Gil (born September 18, 1985) is a South Korean cross-country skier who has competed since 2002. He finished 79th in the 15 km event at the 2010 Winter Olympics in Vancouver, British Columbia, Canada.

Lee finished 80th in the individual sprint event at the FIS Nordic World Ski Championships 2009 in Liberec.

His best World Cup finish was 81st in an individual sprint event at Finland in 2008.
