= Andrey Larkov =

Russian cross-country skier

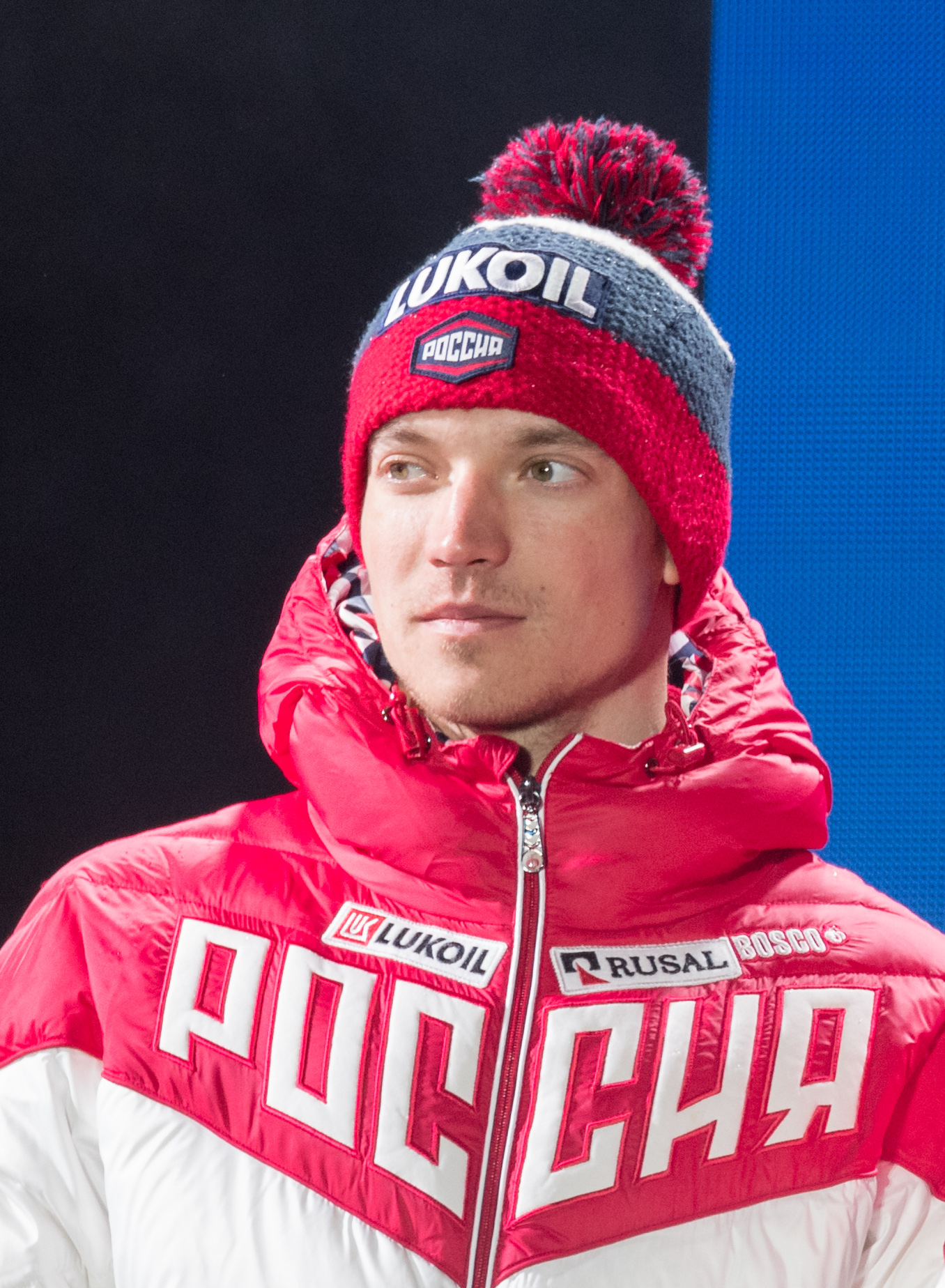

Personal information
- Full name: Andrey Vitalyevich Larkov
- Nationality: Russia
- Born: 25 November 1989 (age 36) Zelenodolsk, Tatar ASSR, Soviet Union
- Height: 1.83 m (6 ft 0 in)

Sport
- Sport: Skiing
- Club: Dynamo

World Cup career
- Seasons: 10 – (2013–2022)
- Indiv. starts: 137
- Indiv. podiums: 2
- Indiv. wins: 0
- Team starts: 4
- Team podiums: 2
- Team wins: 0
- Overall titles: 0 – (12th in 2019)
- Discipline titles: 0
Medal record
Men's cross-country skiing
Representing Olympic Athletes from Russia
Olympic Games
Silver medal – second place	2018 Pyeongchang	4 × 10 km relay
Bronze medal – third place	2018 Pyeongchang	50 km classical
Representing Russia
World Championships
Silver medal – second place	2017 Lahti	4 × 10 km relay
Silver medal – second place	2019 Seefeld	4 × 10 km relay
Universiade
Gold medal – first place	2015 Štrbské Pleso	Individual sprint
Gold medal – first place	2015 Štrbské Pleso	30 km freestyle
Gold medal – first place	2015 Štrbské Pleso	4 × 7.5 km relay
- Updated on 23 March 2023

Andrey Vitalyevich Larkov (Russian: Андрей Витальевич Ларьков; born 25 November 1989) is a Russian cross-country skier.

== Career ==
He competed in the World Cup 2015 season. He represented Russia at the FIS Nordic World Ski Championships 2015 in Falun.

== Cross-country skiing results ==
All results are sourced from the International Ski Federation (FIS).

=== Olympic Games ===
- 2 medals – (1 silver, 1 bronze)

Year	Age	15 km individual	30 km skiathlon	50 km mass start	Sprint	4 × 10 km relay	Team sprint
2018	28	20	30	Bronze	—	Silver	—

=== World Championships ===
- 2 medals – (2 silver)

Year	Age	15 km individual	30 km skiathlon	50 km mass start	Sprint	4 × 10 km relay	Team sprint
2015	25	26	—		—	—	—
2017	27	5	8	—	—	Silver	—
2019	29	4	—	—	—	Silver	—

=== World Cup ===
==== Season standings ====
Season	Age	Discipline standings			Ski Tour standings				
Season	Age	Overall	Distance	Sprint	Nordic Opening	Tour de Ski	Ski Tour 2020	World Cup Final	Ski Tour Canada
2013	23	52	38	NC	—	32	—N/a	—	—N/a
2014	24	128	106	70	—	34	—N/a	—	—N/a
2015	25	38	36	57	69	23	—N/a	—N/a	—N/a
2016	26	21	22	47	—	26	—N/a	—N/a	11
2017	27	19	16	33	16	22	—N/a	8	—N/a
2018	28	18	20	62	25	10	—N/a	11	—N/a
2019	29	12	7	68	6	10	—N/a	11	—N/a
2020	30	13	14	55	11	13	17	—N/a	—N/a
2021	31	108	68	—	—	—	—N/a	—N/a	—N/a
2022 (Note: On 1 March 2022, following the 2022 Russian invasion of Ukraine, FIS decided to not allow athletes from Russian and Belarus to take part in FIS competitions, with an immediate effect.)	32	85	49	NC	—N/a	—	—N/a	—N/a	—N/a

==== Individual podiums ====
- 2 podiums – (1 WC, 1 SWC)

No.	Season	Date	Location	Race	Level	Place
1	2017–18	6 January 2018	Val di Fiemme, Italy	15 km Mass Start C	Stage World Cup	2nd
2	2018–19	9 March 2019	Oslo, Norway	50 km Mass Start C	World Cup	3rd

==== Team podiums ====
- 2 podiums – (2 RL)

No.	Season	Date	Location	Race	Level	Place	Teammates
1	2018–19	27 January 2019	Ulricehamn, Sweden	4 × 7.5 km Relay C/F	World Cup	2nd	Bolshunov / Melnichenko / Ustiugov
2	2019–20	8 December 2019	Lillehammer, Norway	4 × 7.5 km Relay C/F	World Cup	2nd	Semikov / Spitsov / Melnichenko
