= Sun Qinghai =

Chinese cross-country skier

- Simplified Chinese: 孙清海
- Traditional Chinese: 孫清海
Transcriptions
Standard Mandarin
- Hanyu Pinyin: Sūn Qīnghǎi
- IPA: [swə́n tɕʰíŋ xàɪ]

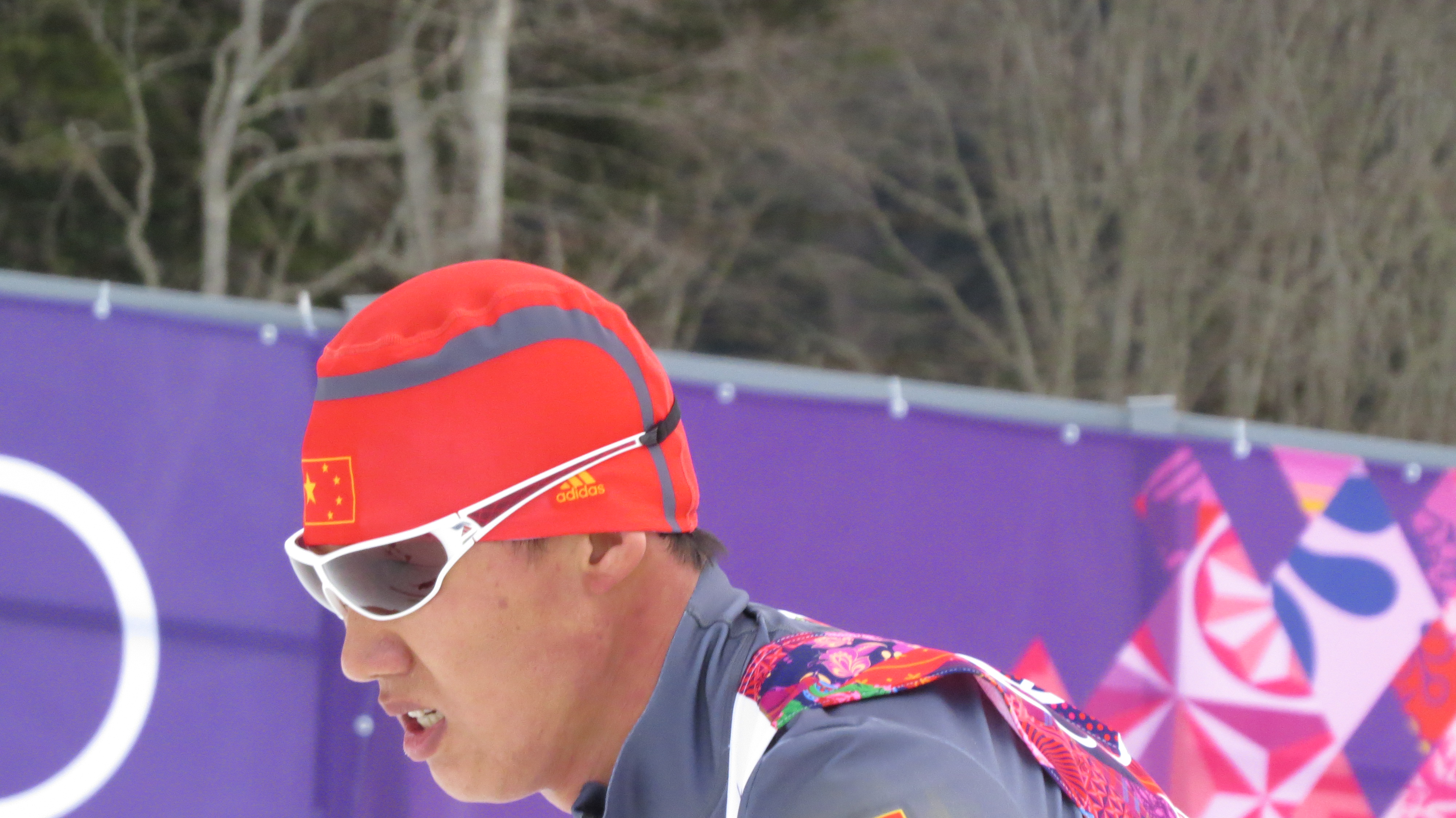
Cross-country skiing at the 2014 Winter Olympics - 15 km in classic style (men)

Sun Qinghai (Chinese: 孙清海; pinyin: Sūn Qīnghǎi; Mandarin pronunciation: [swə́n tɕʰíŋ xàɪ]; born January 18, 1988, in Harbin, Heilongjiang) is a Chinese cross-country skier who has competed since 2006. He competed for China at the 2010 Winter Olympics in the team sprint and individual sprint events where he finished 19th and 21st, respectively.

At the FIS Nordic World Ski Championships 2007, Sun finished 48th in the sprint event while not finishing in the 30 km event.

His best World Cup finish was 25th in a sprint event in China
