= Adam Fellner =

Czech cross-country skier

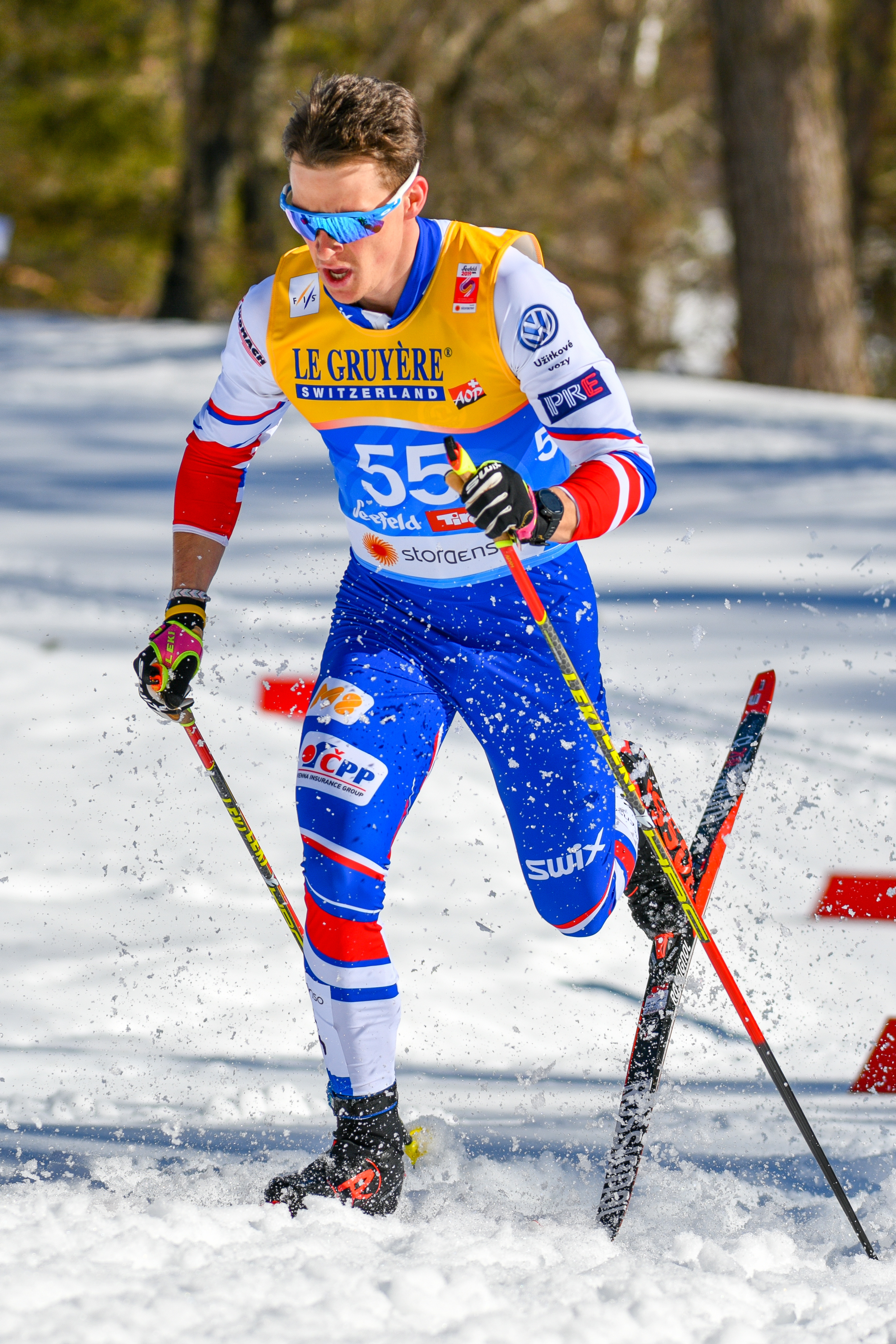
- Adam Fellner in 2019

Personal information
- Nationality: Czech Republic
- Born: 10 August 1993 (age 32) Jeseník, Czech Republic

Sport
- Sport: Skiing
- Club: Fenix Ski Team Jeseník

World Cup career
- Seasons: 7 – (2016, 2018–present)
- Indiv. starts: 72
- Indiv. podiums: 0
- Team starts: 6
- Team podiums: 0
- Overall titles: 0 – (117th in 2022)
- Discipline titles: 0
- Updated on 29 March 2023

Adam Fellner (born 10 August 1993) is a Czech cross-country skier who competes internationally.

He represented his country at the 2022 Winter Olympics.

== Cross-country skiing results ==
All results are sourced from the International Ski Federation (FIS).

=== Olympic Games ===
| Year | Age | 15 km individual | 30 km skiathlon | 50 km mass start | Sprint | 4 × 10 km relay | Team sprint |
|---|---|---|---|---|---|---|---|
| 2022 | 28 | 31 | 46 | 42^{[a]} | — | 12 | — |

^{a} Distance reduced to 30 km due to weather conditions.

=== World Championships ===
| Year | Age | 15 km individual | 30 km skiathlon | 50 km mass start | Sprint | 4 × 10 km relay | Team sprint |
|---|---|---|---|---|---|---|---|
| 2019 | 25 | 49 | 51 | — | — | 11 | — |
| 2021 | 27 | 46 | 26 | 48 | — | 11 | — |
| 2023 | 29 | 36 | 21 | — | — | — | — |

=== World Cup ===
==== Season standings ====
| Season | Age | Discipline standings | | | | Ski Tour standings | | | | |
| Season | Age | Overall | Distance | Sprint | U23 | Nordic Opening | Tour de Ski | Ski Tour 2020 | World Cup Final | Ski Tour Canada |
|---|---|---|---|---|---|---|---|---|---|---|
| 2016 | 22 | NC | NC | — | NC | — | — | —N/a | —N/a | — |
| 2018 | 24 | NC | NC | NC | —N/a | — | — | —N/a | — | —N/a |
| 2019 | 25 | NC | NC | NC | —N/a | 72 | 40 | —N/a | — | —N/a |
| 2020 | 26 | 140 | NC | NC | —N/a | — | 47 | — | —N/a | —N/a |
| 2021 | 27 | 136 | NC | NC | —N/a | — | 47 | —N/a | —N/a | —N/a |
| 2022 | 28 | 117 | 84 | NC | —N/a | —N/a | 35 | —N/a | —N/a | —N/a |
| 2023 | 29 | 132 | 98 | 115 | —N/a | —N/a | 41 | —N/a | —N/a | —N/a |
