= Ridder, Kazakhstan =

Ridder Риддер
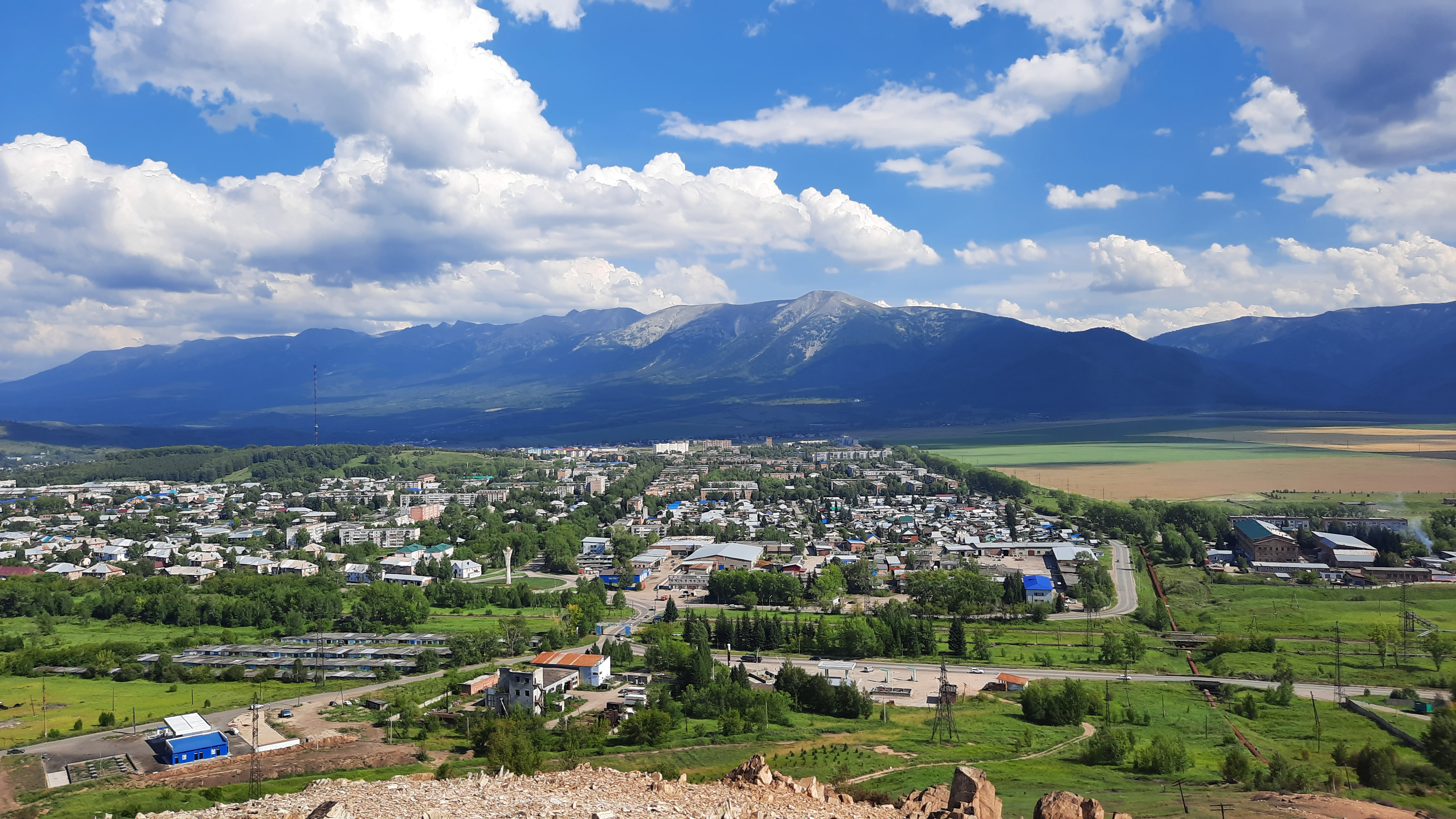

- Seal

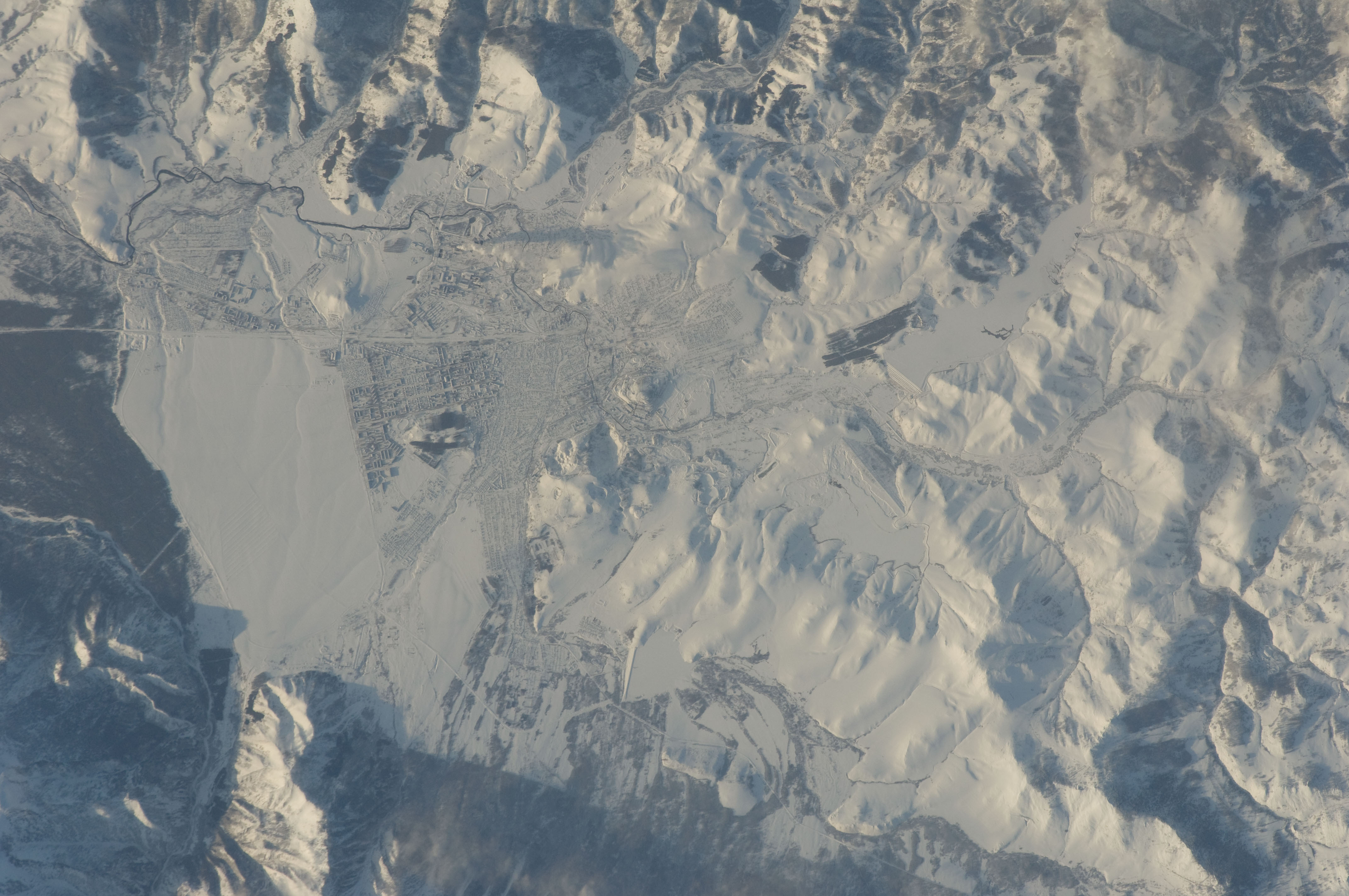
- Image of Ridder taken from the International Space Station

- Location in Kazakhstan
- Coordinates: 50°21′N 83°31′E
- Country: Kazakhstan
- Region: East Kazakhstan Region
- Founded: May 31, 1786
- Incorporated (city): February 10, 1934

Government
  - Akim (mayor): Duman Rakhmetkaliev
- Elevation: 730 m (2,400 ft)

Population (2025)
  - Total: 50,874
- Time zone: UTC+5
- Postal code: 071300-071303
- Area code: +7 72336

Ridder (Kazakh: Риддер, romanized: Ridder; formerly known as Leninogorsk; Russian: Лениногорск) is a city in the East Kazakhstan Region in northeastern Kazakhstan. Its population is approximately 50,500 (2009 census results). The city is in the south-western Altai Mountains and northeast of the region's capital, Oskemen, along the Ulba River, at an elevation higher than 700 metres. Ridder marks the eastern end of European Route E40.

== History ==
The fact that Altai Krai is rich in natural deposits was discovered during Empress Catherine the Great's reign. Ridder was founded in 1786 when 9 troops of men were sent to the Altai region to search for natural resource deposits. On May 31, 1786 an officer, Philip Ridder, found a rich deposit containing gold, silver and other metals.

During the early 20th century Ridder experienced a number of foreign concessions, revolution and Civil war. On February 10, 1934, Ridder was designated a town. In 1941 Ridder was renamed to Leninogorsk (for Lenin).

During World War II Leninogorsk produced about 50% of the high-quality lead in the whole Soviet Union. In 2002 the city returned to its original name, Ridder.

== Climate ==
Ridder has a warm-summer humid continental climate (Köppen climate classification Dfb) with mild summers and very cold winters.

Climate data for Ridder (1991–2020, extremes 1951–present)
| Month | Jan | Feb | Mar | Apr | May | Jun | Jul | Aug | Sep | Oct | Nov | Dec | Year |
|---|---|---|---|---|---|---|---|---|---|---|---|---|---|
| Record high °C (°F) | 12.6 (54.7) | 12.3 (54.1) | 21.1 (70.0) | 28.4 (83.1) | 34.2 (93.6) | 34.6 (94.3) | 37.0 (98.6) | 35.7 (96.3) | 34.3 (93.7) | 26.2 (79.2) | 20.7 (69.3) | 12.0 (53.6) | 37.0 (98.6) |
| Mean daily maximum °C (°F) | −6.6 (20.1) | −3.8 (25.2) | 2.5 (36.5) | 11.2 (52.2) | 18.1 (64.6) | 22.8 (73.0) | 24.2 (75.6) | 23.1 (73.6) | 17.2 (63.0) | 9.9 (49.8) | 0.1 (32.2) | −5.3 (22.5) | 9.5 (49.0) |
| Daily mean °C (°F) | −12.8 (9.0) | −10.7 (12.7) | −4.3 (24.3) | 4.6 (40.3) | 11.1 (52.0) | 15.9 (60.6) | 17.5 (63.5) | 15.7 (60.3) | 9.9 (49.8) | 3.4 (38.1) | −5.7 (21.7) | −10.7 (12.7) | 2.8 (37.1) |
| Mean daily minimum °C (°F) | −18.1 (−0.6) | −16.9 (1.6) | −10.6 (12.9) | −2.0 (28.4) | 3.9 (39.0) | 9.0 (48.2) | 11.1 (52.0) | 8.7 (47.7) | 3.0 (37.4) | −2.0 (28.4) | −10.6 (12.9) | −15.6 (3.9) | −3.3 (26.0) |
| Record low °C (°F) | −45.4 (−49.7) | −41.0 (−41.8) | −37.2 (−35.0) | −24.0 (−11.2) | −12.2 (10.0) | −2.8 (27.0) | 2.1 (35.8) | −2.0 (28.4) | −11.7 (10.9) | −23.3 (−9.9) | −47 (−53) | −40.9 (−41.6) | −47.0 (−52.6) |
| Average precipitation mm (inches) | 18.6 (0.73) | 21.7 (0.85) | 35.1 (1.38) | 59.6 (2.35) | 74.7 (2.94) | 77.7 (3.06) | 84.9 (3.34) | 63.0 (2.48) | 56.0 (2.20) | 61.9 (2.44) | 50.6 (1.99) | 32.9 (1.30) | 636.7 (25.06) |
| Average precipitation days (≥ 1.0 mm) | 5.7 | 5.9 | 7.4 | 8.9 | 9.9 | 10.2 | 11.4 | 8.6 | 8.3 | 10.0 | 9.1 | 8.6 | 104.0 |
| Average relative humidity (%) | 73 | 68 | 70 | 67 | 63 | 62 | 68 | 67 | 67 | 69 | 74 | 75 | 69 |
| Mean monthly sunshine hours | 100 | 135 | 201 | 232 | 278 | 300 | 313 | 283 | 222 | 140 | 105 | 89 | 2,398 |
| Mean daily sunshine hours | 3.2 | 4.8 | 6.5 | 7.7 | 9.0 | 10.0 | 10.1 | 9.1 | 7.4 | 4.5 | 3.5 | 2.9 | 6.6 |
Source 1: Pogoda.ru.net
Source 2: NOAA (sun, 1961–1990), Deutscher Wetterdienst (humidity 1991-2001, daily sun 1961-1990)

== Ethnic Composition ==
At the beginning of 2025, the population of the city within the territory of the city akimat was 50,874 people

- Russians — 37,395 (73.51%)
- Kazakhs — 10,606 (20.85%)
- Germans — 821 (1.61%)
- Tatars — 506 (0.99%)
- Ukrainians — 482 (0.95%)

== Sports ==
In March 2013, Ridder hosted the World Ski Orienteering Championships.

== Notable person ==
- Oleg Boltin, professional wrestler
