= Hamza Dursun =

Turkish cross-country skier (born 1994)

Personal information
- Nationality: Turkish
- Born: 11 February 1994 (age 31)

Sport
- Sport: Cross-country skiing

Hamza Dursun (born 11 February 1994) is a Turkish cross-country skier. He competed in the 2018 Winter Olympics.

Hamza was born in the Ağrı province of Turkey. His hobbies include fishing, swimming and basketball.
