= Luis Stadlober =

Austrian cross-country skier

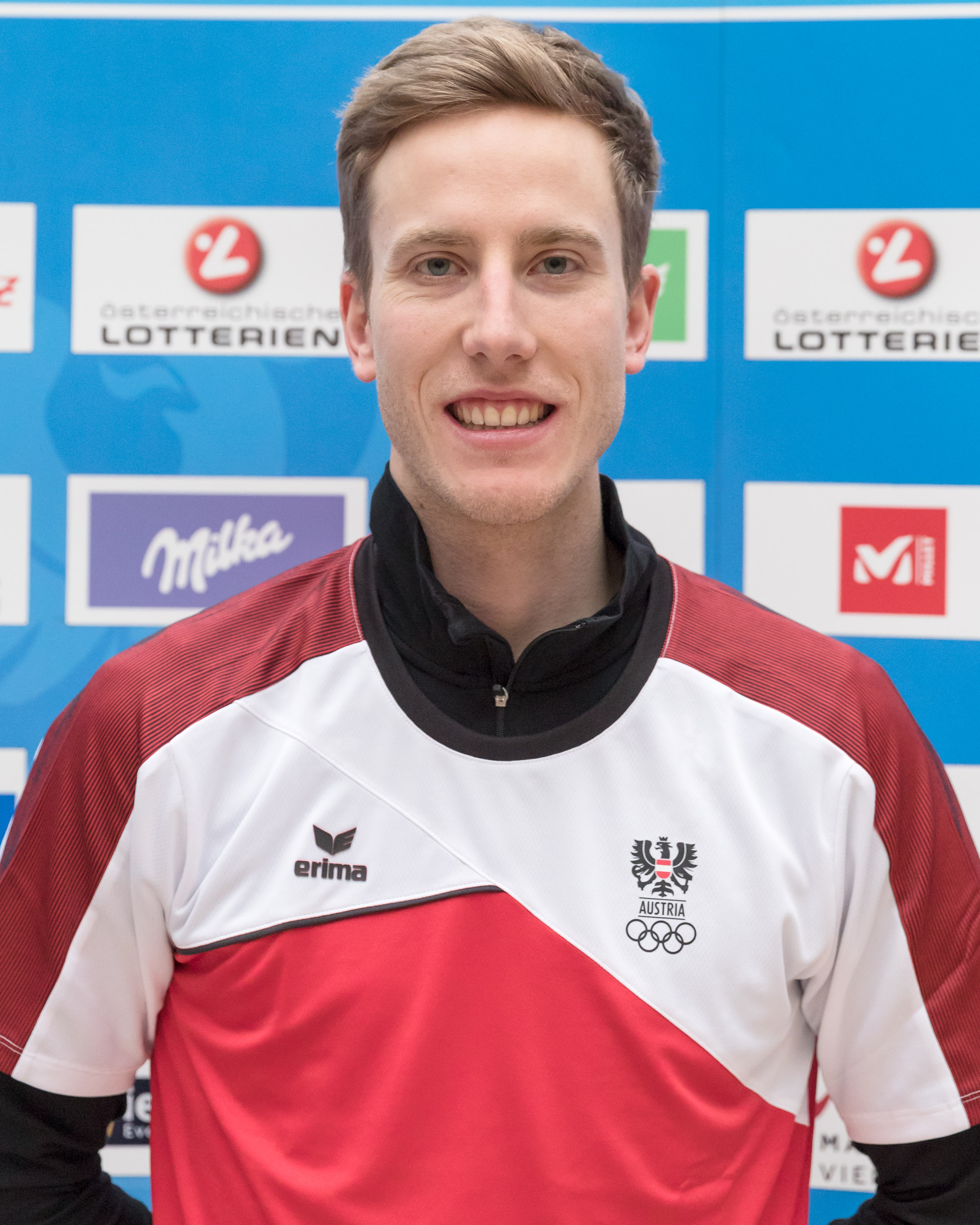
- Stadlober in 2018

Personal information
- Nationality: Austria
- Born: 23 July 1991 (age 34) Schladming, Austria
- Height: 1.89 m (6 ft 2 in)

Sport
- Sport: Skiing
- Club: SC Sparkasse Radstadt-Salzburg

World Cup career
- Seasons: 2016–2019
- Indiv. starts: 32
- Indiv. podiums: 0
- Team starts: 2
- Team podiums: 0
- Overall titles: 0 – (134th in 2016)
- Discipline titles: 0
- Updated on 13 April 2019

Luis Stadlober (born 23 July 1991) is a former cross-country skier from Austria. He competed in the 2018 Winter Olympics. He announced his retirement from cross-country skiing in April 2019.

He is the son of Austrian cross-country skier Alois Stadlober and Austrian alpine skier Roswitha Steiner, and older brother of cross-country skier Teresa Stadlober.

== Cross-country skiing results ==
All results are sourced from the International Ski Federation (FIS).

=== Olympic Games ===
Year	Age	15 km individual	30 km skiathlon	50 km mass start	Sprint	4 × 10 km relay	Team sprint
2018	26	—	—	—	54	13	—

=== World Championships ===
Year	Age	15 km individual	30 km skiathlon	50 km mass start	Sprint	4 × 10 km relay	Team sprint
2017	25	37	—	—	45	—	18
2019	27	56	—	—	49	—	—

=== World Cup ===
==== Season standings ====
Season	Age	Discipline standings			Ski Tour standings			
Season	Age	Overall	Distance	Sprint	Nordic Opening	Tour de Ski	World Cup Final	Ski Tour Canada
2016	24	134	NC	86	—	DNF	—N/a	48
2017	25	171	NC	100	—	—	—	—N/a
2018	26	NC	NC	NC	DNF	DNF	—	—N/a
2019	27	NC	NC	NC	—	DNF	—	—N/a
