= Yevgeniy Velichko =

Kazakhstani cross-country skier (born 1987)

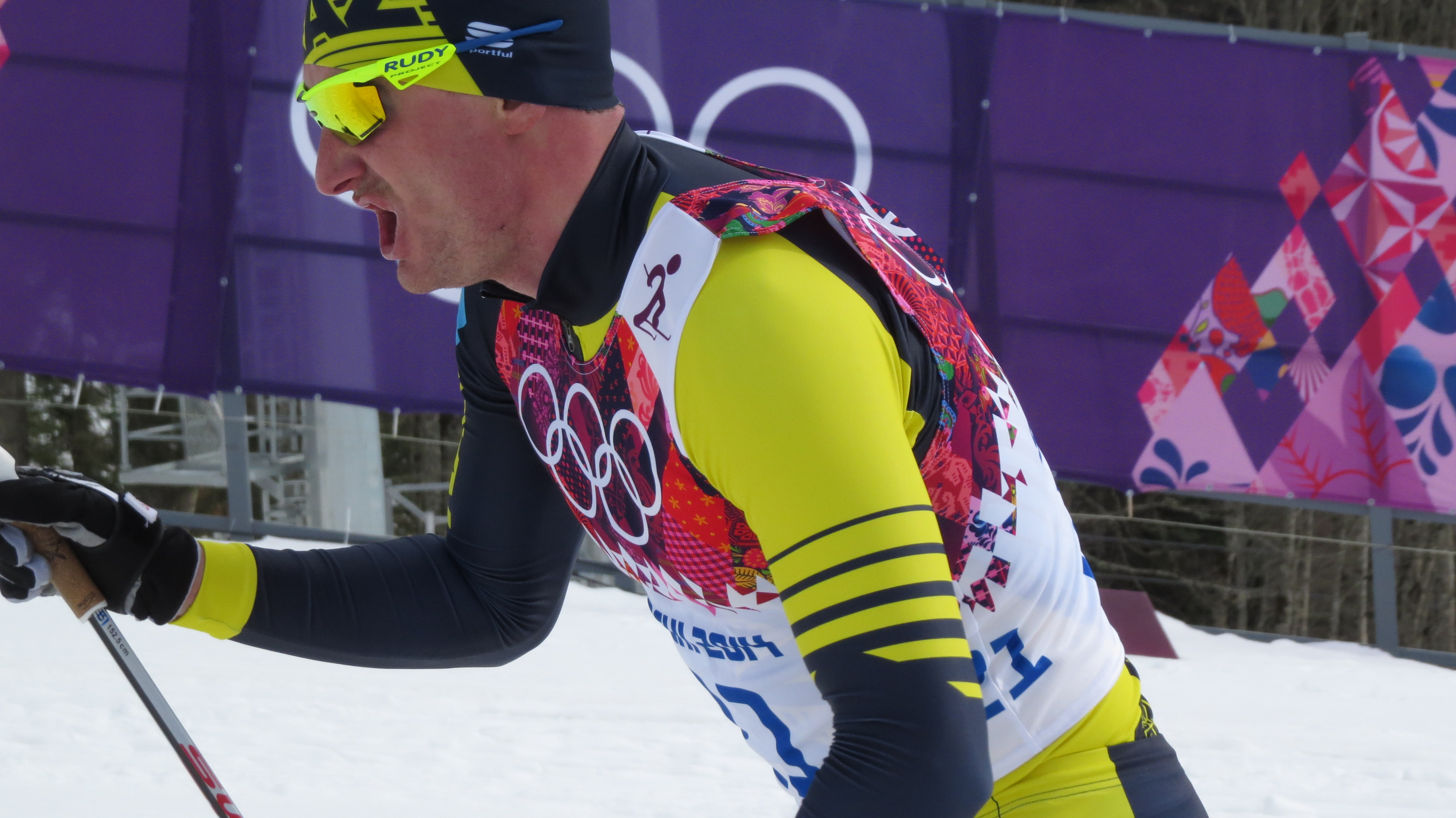
- Velichko in 2014

Personal information
- Full name: Yevgeniy Aleksandrovich Velichko
- Born: 2 April 1987 (age 39) Shchuchinsk, Kokchetav Oblast, Kazakh SSR, Soviet Union

Sport
- Sport: Skiing
Medal record
Men's cross-country skiing
Representing Kazakhstan
Asian Games
Gold medal – first place	2011 Astana-Almaty	4×10 km relay
Winter Universiade
Silver medal – second place	2015 Štrbské Pleso	4×7.5 km relay

Yevgeniy Aleksandrovich Velichko (Russian: Евгений Александрович Величко, born 2 April 1987) is a Kazakh cross-country skier. He represented Kazakhstan at the 2010 Winter Olympics in Vancouver.

At the 2010 Games, Velichko earned his best finish of 11th in the 4 x 10 km relay.
