= Hiroyuki Miyazawa =

Japanese cross-country skier (born 1991)

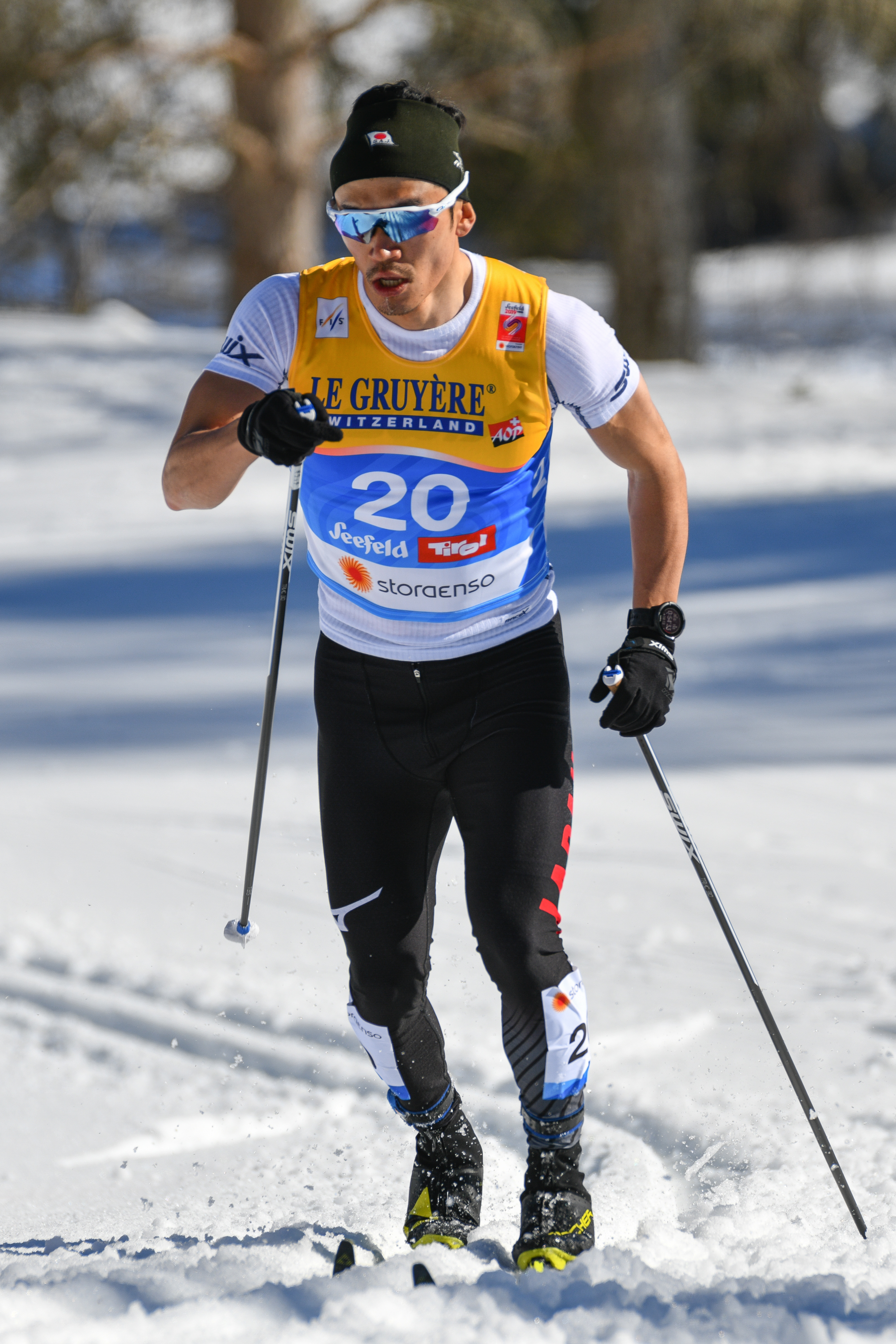
- Hiroyuki Miyazawa in 2019

Personal information
- Born: October 12, 1991 (age 34) Tōkamachi, Niigata, Japan
- Height: 1.72 m (5 ft 8 in)
- Weight: 74 kg (163 lb)

Sport
- Country: Japan
- Sport: Cross-country skiing

Hiroyuki Miyazawa (Japanese: 宮沢 大志, born 12 October 1991) is a Japanese cross-country skier who participated in the 2014 Winter Olympics.

He competed at the 2022 Winter Olympics.
