= Biathlon at the 2011 Asian Winter Games =

- Venue: Biathlon and Cross-Country Ski Complex
- Dates: 31 January – 6 February 2011
- Competitors: 38 from 7 nations

Biathlon at the 2011 Asian Winter Games was held at Biathlon/Cross-Country Ski Complex in Almaty, Kazakhstan. The seven events were scheduled for January 31 – February 6, 2011.

== Schedule ==
F	Final

Event↓/Date →	31st Mon	1st Tue	2nd Wed	3rd Thu	4th Fri	5th Sat	6th Sun
Men's 10 km sprint		F					
Men's 12.5 km pursuit			F				
Men's 20 km individual					F		
Men's 4 × 7.5 km relay							F
Women's 7.5 km sprint	F						
Women's 15 km individual					F		
Women's 4 × 6 km relay						F	

== Medalists ==
=== Men ===
Event	Gold	Silver	Bronze
10 km sprint	Alexandr Chervyakov; Kazakhstan	Ren Long; China	Junji Nagai; Japan
12.5 km pursuit	Alexandr Chervyakov; Kazakhstan	Junji Nagai; Japan	Ren Long; China
20 km individual	Junji Nagai; Japan	Ren Long; China	Li Zhonghai; China
4 × 7.5 km relay	Kazakhstan; Alexandr Chervyakov; Nikolay Braichenko; Yan Savitskiy; Dias Keneshev	Japan; Junji Nagai; Hidenori Isa; Kazuya Inomata; Satoru Abo	China; Ren Long; Zhang Chengye; Chen Haibin; Li Zhonghai

=== Women ===
Event	Gold	Silver	Bronze
7.5 km sprint	Wang Chunli; China	Yelena Khrustaleva; Kazakhstan	Marina Lebedeva; Kazakhstan
15 km individual	Yelena Khrustaleva; Kazakhstan	Fuyuko Suzuki; Japan	Marina Lebedeva; Kazakhstan
4 × 6 km relay	Kazakhstan; Marina Lebedeva; Olga Poltoranina; Inna Mozhevitina; Yelena Khrustaleva	China; Wang Chunli; Tang Jialin; Xu Yinghui; Liu Yuanyuan	Japan; Fuyuko Suzuki; Itsuka Owada; Ayako Mukai; Natsuko Abe

== Medal table ==
Rank	Nation	Gold	Silver	Bronze	Total
1	Kazakhstan (KAZ)	5	1	2	8
2	China (CHN)	1	3	3	7
3	Japan (JPN)	1	3	2	6
Totals (3 entries)		7	7	7	21

== Participating nations ==
A total of 38 athletes from 7 nations competed in biathlon at the 2011 Asian Winter Games:

- China (8)
- Chinese Taipei (2)
- Japan (8)
- Kazakhstan (8)
- Kyrgyzstan (2)
- South Korea (8)
- Uzbekistan (2)
