= Freestyle skiing at the 2011 Asian Winter Games =

- Venue: Tabagan Sport and Recreation Complex
- Dates: 31 January – 3 February 2011
- Competitors: 32 from 5 nations

Freestyle skiing at the 2011 Asian Winter Games was held at Tabagan Sport and Recreation Complex in the Almaty region, Kazakhstan. The six events were scheduled for January 31– February 3, 2011.

== Schedule ==
| Q | Qualification | F | Final |

| Event↓/Date → | 31st Mon | | 1st Tue | 2nd Wed | 3rd Thu | |
|---|---|---|---|---|---|---|
| Men's aerials | | | F | | | |
| Men's moguls | Q | F | | | | |
| Men's dual moguls | | | | | Q | F |
| Women's aerials | | | F | | | |
| Women's moguls | Q | F | | | | |
| Women's dual moguls | | | | | Q | F |

== Medalists ==
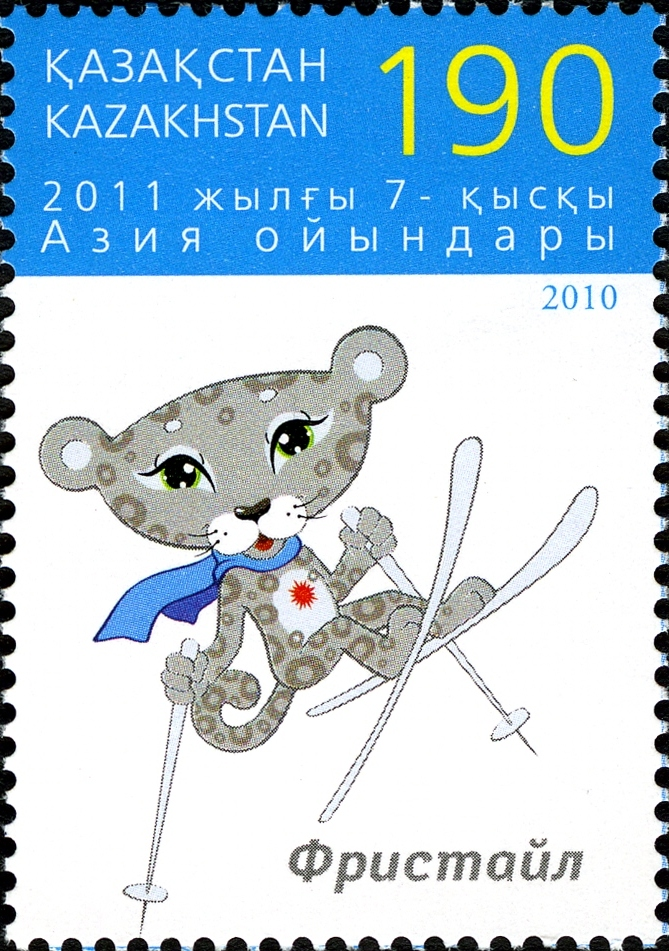
Stamps of Kazakhstan, 2010

=== Men ===
| Event | Gold | Silver | Bronze |
|---|---|---|---|
| Aerials | Jia Zongyang; China | Liu Zhongqing; China | Ruslan Ablyatifov; Kazakhstan |
| Moguls | Dmitriy Reiherd; Kazakhstan | Osamu Ueno; Japan | Dmitriy Barmashov; Kazakhstan |
| Dual moguls | Dmitriy Barmashov; Kazakhstan | Osamu Ueno; Japan | Yugo Tsukita; Japan |

=== Women ===
| Event | Gold | Silver | Bronze |
|---|---|---|---|
| Aerials | Zhang Xin; China | Zhibek Arapbayeva; Kazakhstan | Yang Yu; China |
| Moguls | Yuliya Galysheva; Kazakhstan | Miki Ito; Japan | Ning Qin; China |
| Dual moguls | Yuliya Galysheva; Kazakhstan | Yuliya Rodionova; Kazakhstan | Miki Ito; Japan |

== Medal table ==
| Rank | Nation | Gold | Silver | Bronze | Total |
|---|---|---|---|---|---|
| 1 | Kazakhstan (KAZ) | 4 | 2 | 2 | 8 |
| 2 | China (CHN) | 2 | 1 | 2 | 5 |
| 3 | Japan (JPN) | 0 | 3 | 2 | 5 |
| Totals (3 entries) | | 6 | 6 | 6 | 18 |

== Participating nations ==
A total of 32 athletes from 5 nations competed in freestyle skiing at the 2011 Asian Winter Games:

- China (10)
- Japan (5)
- Kazakhstan (8)
- Mongolia (5)
- South Korea (4)
