= Freestyle skiing at the 2011 Asian Winter Games – Women's moguls =

Women's moguls at the 2011 Asian Winter Games
- Venue: Tabagan Sport and Recreation Complex
- Dates: 31 January 2011
- Competitors: 9 from 5 nations

Medalists
| gold medal | Yuliya Galysheva | Kazakhstan |
| silver medal | Miki Ito | Japan |
| bronze medal | Ning Qin | China |

The women's moguls at the 2011 Asian Winter Games was held on 31 January 2011 at Tabagan Sport and Recreation Complex in Almaty, Kazakhstan.

== Schedule ==
All times are Almaty Time (UTC+06:00)

| Date | Time | Event |
|---|---|---|
| Monday, 31 January 2011 | 10:05 | Qualification |
| Monday, 31 January 2011 | 11:00 | Final |

== Results ==
Legend

- DNS — Did not start

=== Qualification ===
| Rank | Athlete | Score |
|---|---|---|
| 1 | Yuliya Galysheva (KAZ) | 20.64 |
| 2 | Miki Ito (JPN) | 16.51 |
| 3 | Tae Satoya (JPN) | 15.73 |
| 4 | Seo Jung-hwa (KOR) | 14.51 |
| 5 | Yuliya Rodionova (KAZ) | 14.45 |
| 6 | Li Nan (CHN) | 14.05 |
| 7 | Ning Qin (CHN) | 3.49 |
| — | Jargalsürengiin Tögszayaa (MGL) | DNS |
| — | Altanzulyn Ariunzayaa (MGL) | DNS |

=== Final ===
| Rank | Athlete | Score |
|---|---|---|
| 1st place, gold medalist(s) | Yuliya Galysheva (KAZ) | 22.09 |
| 2nd place, silver medalist(s) | Miki Ito (JPN) | 17.48 |
| 3rd place, bronze medalist(s) | Ning Qin (CHN) | 17.11 |
| 4 | Tae Satoya (JPN) | 16.80 |
| 5 | Li Nan (CHN) | 16.28 |
| 6 | Seo Jung-hwa (KOR) | 16.27 |
| 7 | Yuliya Rodionova (KAZ) | 15.29 |
