= Biathlon World Championships 2013 – Men's individual =

Men's individual at the Biathlon World Championships 2013
- Date: 14 February 2013
- Competitors: 135 from 40 nations
- Winning time: 49:43.0

Medalists
gold medal	Martin Fourcade	France
silver medal	Tim Burke	United States
bronze medal	Fredrik Lindström	Sweden

The Men's individual event of the Biathlon World Championships 2013 was held on 14 February 2013. 135 athletes participated over a course of 20 km.

== Results ==
The race was started at 17:15.

Rank	Bib	Name	Nationality	Time	Penalties (P+S+P+S)	Deficit
1st place, gold medalist(s)	29	Martin Fourcade	France	49:43.0	1 (0+0+0+1)	
2nd place, silver medalist(s)	65	Tim Burke	United States	50:06.5	1 (0+0+0+1)	+25.3
3rd place, bronze medalist(s)	27	Fredrik Lindström	Sweden	50:16.7	1 (0+0+0+1)	+33.7
4	42	Ondřej Moravec	Czech Republic	50:31.6	2 (1+0+0+1)	+48.6
5	4	Björn Ferry	Sweden	50:54.8	1 (1+0+0+0)	+1:11.8
6	107	Simon Fourcade	France	51:01.4	1 (0+0+1+0)	+1:18.4
7	10	Lukas Hofer	Italy	51:02.0	2 (0+0+0+2)	+1:19.0
8	26	Andreas Birnbacher	Germany	51:19.6	2 (1+0+0+1)	+1:36.6
9	40	Henrik L'Abée-Lund	Norway	51:20.3	2 (0+0+0+2)	+1:37.3
10	15	Jean-Philippe Leguellec	Canada	51:31.4	1 (0+0+0+1)	+1:48.4
11	45	Yan Savitskiy	Kazakhstan	51:36.8	1 (1+0+0+0)	+1:53.8
12	57	Tarjei Bø	Norway	51:40.7	2 (0+0+0+2)	+1:57.7
13	63	Jean-Guillaume Béatrix	France	51:50.6	2 (0+2+0+0)	+2:07.6
14	11	Dominik Landertinger	Austria	52:00.0	2 (0+1+0+1)	+2:07.6
15	47	Alexey Volkov	Russia	52:01.9	2 (0+0+1+1)	+2:07.6
16	18	Sergey Novikov	Belarus	52:07.3	1 (0+0+1+0)	+2:24.3
17	33	Andriy Deryzemlya	Ukraine	52:17.1	1 (0+1+0+0)	+2:34.1
18	53	Dominik Windisch	Italy	52:31.2	3 (0+2+1+0)	+2:48.2
19	5	Benjamin Weger	Switzerland	52:32.1	1 (0+1+0+0)	+2:49.1
20	6	Jakov Fak	Slovenia	52:33.4	3 (1+0+0+2)	+2:50.4
21	70	Peter Dokl	Slovenia	52:36.2	0 (0+0+0+0)	+2:53.2
22	101	Leif Nordgren	United States	52:49.8	2 (1+0+1+0)	+3:06.8
23	32	Tomas Kaukėnas	Lithuania	52:50.5	2 (0+1+0+1)	+3:07.5
24	129	Ivan Joller	Switzerland	52:52.1	0 (0+0+0+0)	+3:09.1
25	14	Ole Einar Bjørndalen	Norway	53:02.1	3 (0+0+1+2)	+3:19.1
26	58	Scott Perras	Canada	53:03.2	2 (0+0+1+1)	+3:20.2
27	17	Alexis Bœuf	France	53:07.2	2 (1+0+0+1)	+3:24.2
28	73	Arnd Peiffer	Germany	53:07.5	3 (1+1+1+0)	+3:24.5
29	13	Lowell Bailey	United States	53:09.3	3 (0+2+0+1)	+3:26.3
30	108	Michal Šlesingr	Czech Republic	53:17.3	2 (1+0+0+1)	+3:34.3
31	94	Scott Gow	Canada	53:19.3	1 (0+0+0+1)	+3:36.3
32	48	Miroslav Matiaško	Slovakia	53:28.8	1 (0+1+0+0)	+3:45.8
33	25	Anton Shipulin	Russia	53:29.5	4 (1+1+1+1)	+3:46.5
34	1	Erik Lesser	Germany	53:32.6	3 (1+2+0+0)	+3:49.6
35	72	Carl Johan Bergman	Sweden	53:43.9	3 (0+2+1+0)	+4:00.9
36	62	Kauri Kõiv	Estonia	53:49.9	3 (2+0+0+1)	+4:06.9
37	20	Krasimir Anev	Bulgaria	53:53.2	4 (1+1+1+1)	+4:10.2
38	85	Claudio Böckli	Switzerland	53:56.7	1 (1+0+0+0)	+4:13.7
39	52	Jaroslav Soukup	Czech Republic	54:00.6	4 (1+0+1+2)	+4:17.6
40	81	Florian Graf	Germany	54:06.0	4 (1+1+0+2)	+4:23.0
41	55	Łukasz Szczurek	Poland	54:12.1	1 (0+0+0+1)	+4:29.1
42	69	Simon Eder	Austria	54:16.1	4 (0+2+1+1)	+4:33.1
43	59	Stefan Gavrila	Romania	54:29.2	4 (1+2+0+1)	+4:46.2
44	80	Lars Helge Birkeland	Norway	54:33.9	2 (0+2+0+0)	+4:50.9
45	119	Daniel Mesotitsch	Austria	54:38.7	3 (1+1+1+0)	+4:55.7
46	103	Vladimir Chepelin	Belarus	54:38.8	2 (1+0+0+1)	+4:55.8
47	99	Artem Pryma	Ukraine	54:39.7	2 (0+0+0+2)	+4:56.7
48	8	Evgeny Ustyugov	Russia	54:39.8	5 (0+3+0+2)	+4:56.8
49	43	Serguei Sednev	Ukraine	54:48.7	3 (1+0+0+2)	+5:05.7
50	66	Andrejs Rastorgujevs	Latvia	54:49.2	4 (1+1+1+1)	+5:06.2
51	28	Joel Sloof	Netherlands	54:51.9	2 (1+0+1+0)	+5:08.9
52	36	Krzysztof Plywaczyk	Poland	55:10.3	3 (1+0+0+2)	+5:27.3
53	84	Matej Kazár	Slovakia	55:18.6	4 (1+0+2+1)	+5:35.6
54	19	Jarkko Kauppinen	Finland	55:26.8	2 (0+0+0+2)	+5:43.8
55	96	Christian De Lorenzi	Italy	55:33.2	3 (1+1+1+0)	+5:50.2
56	89	Andrei Makoveev	Russia	55:44.8	5 (1+0+2+2)	+6:01.8
57	31	Indrek Tobreluts	Estonia	55:52.4	5 (1+2+1+1)	+6:09.4
58	44	Mario Dolder	Switzerland	55:54.4	4 (0+0+2+2)	+6:11.4
59	104	Roland Lessing	Estonia	55:56.6	4 (2+0+0+2)	+6:13.6
60	127	Russell Currier	United States	56:13.1	5 (1+1+1+2)	+6:30.1
61	34	Chen Haibin	China	56:16.3	2 (0+1+0+1)	+6:33.3
62	2	Pavol Hurajt	Slovakia	56:17.6	3 (0+0+2+1)	+6:34.6
63	116	Nathan Smith	Canada	56:24.4	3 (0+1+1+1)	+6:41.4
64	87	Sergey Naumik	Kazakhstan	56:40.3	3 (0+1+1+1)	+6:57.3
65	86	Adam Kwak	Poland	56:41.5	3 (1+1+0+1)	+6:58.5
66	111	Christoffer Eriksson	Sweden	56:45.3	4 (0+1+1+2)	+7:02.3
67	114	Zdeněk Vítek	Czech Republic	56:51.4	5 (0+2+2+1)	+7:08.4
68	95	Friedrich Pinter	Austria	56:58.1	5 (1+1+0+3)	+7:15.1
69	71	Ren Long	China	57:03.0	5 (0+2+2+1)	+7:20.0
70	93	Li Zhonghai	China	57:03.1	3 (0+1+1+1)	+7:20.1
71	120	Yuryi Liadov	Belarus	57:06.2	4 (0+2+1+1)	+7:23.2
72	22	Lee In-bok	South Korea	57:30.5	3 (0+1+0+2)	+7:47.5
73	121	Olexander Bilanenko	Ukraine	57:30.7	2 (1+1+0+0)	+7:47.7
74	123	Roland Gerbacea	Romania	57:36.7	4 (1+2+1+0)	+7:53.7
75	98	Jun Je-uk	South Korea	57:38.1	3 (0+0+1+2)	+7:55.1
76	88	Cornel Puchianu	Romania	57:39.1	6 (2+1+2+1)	+7:56.1
77	54	Evgeny Abramenko	Belarus	57:49.8	6 (0+1+2+3)	+8:06.9
78	130	Miroslav Kenanov	Bulgaria	57:57.1	3 (0+2+0+2)	+8:14.1
79	68	Damir Rastić	Serbia	57:57.7	3 (1+2+0+0)	+8:14.7
80	83	Michail Kletcherov	Bulgaria	57:59.0	4 (1+2+0+1)	+8:16.0
81	79	Karol Dombrovski	Lithuania	58:02.1	5 (0+1+2+2)	+8:19.1
82	76	Ahti Toivanen	Finland	58:05.3	5 (0+1+2+2)	+8:22.3
83	21	Dias Keneshev	Kazakhstan	58:07.6	2 (0+1+0+1)	+8:24.6
84	12	Alexei Almoukov	Australia	58:18.9	3 (0+0+0+3)	+8:35.9
85	49	Samuel Pulido Serrano	Spain	58:34.9	3 (1+1+0+1)	+8:51.9
86	24	Edgars Piksons	Latvia	58:39.3	2 (0+1+0+1)	+8:56.3
87	16	Lee-Steve Jackson	Great Britain	58:39.9	5 (0+1+2+2)	+8:56.9
88	38	Milanko Petrović	Serbia	58:49.5	6 (2+2+1+1)	+9:06.5
89	136	Alexsandr Trifonov	Kazakhstan	58:58.7	4 (1+1+1+1)	+9:15.7
90	56	Thorsten Langer	Belgium	59:22.0	1 (0+1+0+0)	+9:39.0
91	7	Remus Faur	Romania	59.23.2	5 (2+1+2+0)	+9:40.2
92	135	Simon Kočevar	Slovenia	59:23.3	3 (0+1+1+1)	+9:40.3
93	117	Dušan Šimočko	Slovakia	59:27.4	4 (1+1+1+1)	+9:44.4
94	23	Victor Lobo Escolar	Spain	59:36.4	3 (1+1+0+1)	+9:53.4
95	126	Mika Kaljunen	Finland	59:38.3	4 (1+1+1+1)	+9:55.3
96	30	Ahmet Üstüntaş	Turkey	59:44.1	2 (1+1+0+0)	+10:01.1
97	100	Emir Hrkalović	Serbia	59:54.0	5 (2+1+1+1)	+10:11.0
98	128	Pietro Dutto	Italy	59:55.4	5 (1+2+1+1)	+10:12.4
99	131	Li Xuezhi	China	1:00:18.8	8 (2+2+1+3)	+10:35.8
100	9	Junji Nagai	Japan	1:00:20.3	6 (0+2+1+2)	+10:37.3
101	110	Janez Marič	Slovenia	1:00:53.3	7 (3+0+2+2)	+11:10.3
102	82	Pete Beyer	Great Britain	1:01:03.0	4 (1+3+0+0)	+11:20.0
103	46	Károly Gombos	Hungary	1:01:16.5	5 (1+1+1+2)	+11:33.5
104	60	Lee Su-young	South Korea	1:01:22.5	6 (1+2+1+2)	+11:39.5
105	51	Kevin Kane	Great Britain	1:01:44.1	8 (2+2+1+3)	+12:01.1
106	78	Nemanja Košarac	Bosnia and Herzegovina	1:01:46.4	7 (0+2+2+3)	+12:03.4
107	77	Hidenori Isa	Japan	1:02:24.0	6 (2+1+2+1)	+12:41.0
108	97	Karolis Zlatkauskas	Lithuania	1:02:53.3	8 (1+3+1+3)	+13:10.3
109	122	Kim Yong-gyu	South Korea	1:02:59.0	7 (4+0+1+2)	+13:16.0
110	134	Danil Steptsenko	Estonia	1:03:10.6	10 (1+3+2+4)	+13:27.6
111	125	Edin Hodžić	Serbia	1:03:36.0	5 (0+0+3+2)	+13:53.0
112	3	Thierry Langer	Belgium	1:03:36.6	3 (0+1+0+2)	+13:53.6
113	35	Darko Damjanovski	Macedonia	1:03:50.7	7 (1+4+0+2)	+14:07.7
114	124	Grzegorz Guzik	Poland	1:04:01.0	9 (1+2+2+4)	+14:18.0
115	118	Marcel Laponder	Great Britain	1:04:23.3	6 (3+1+1+1)	+14:40.3
116	61	Orhangazi Civil	Turkey	1:04:44.9	6 (0+3+2+1)	+15:01.9
117	75	Dino Butković	Croatia	1:04:45.1	8 (2+1+3+2)	+15:02.1
118	115	Rokas Suslavičius	Lithuania	1:04:48.0	6 (0+2+2+2)	+15:05.0
119	39	Victor Pinzaru	Moldova	1:04:55.3	6 (2+0+3+1)	+15:12.3
120	112	Pascal Langer	Belgium	1:05:18.2	6 (1+1+2+2)	+15:35.2
121	102	Rolands Pužulis	Latvia	1:05:22.8	5 (0+1+3+1)	+15:39.8
122	74	Gjorgji Icoski	Macedonia	1:05:26.2	4 (1+1+0+2)	+15:43.2
123	91	Jurica Veverec	Croatia	1:05:31.1	6 (0+2+1+3)	+15:48.1
124	90	Dyllan Harmer	Australia	1:06:08.0	5 (1+0+1+3)	+16:25.0
125	64	Cameron Morton	Australia	1:06:34.1	8 (1+3+1+3)	+16:51.1
126	92	Ryo Maeda	Japan	1:07:15.5	9 (2+2+4+1)	+17:32.5
127	50	Kleanthis Karamichas	Greece	1:07:57.4	7 (2+2+1+2)	+18:14.4
128	132	Sho Wakamatsu	Japan	1:08:24.5	12 (4+3+2+3)	+18:41.5
129	37	Milán Szabó	Hungary	1:08:30.8	11 (2+2+3+4)	+18:47.8
130	109	István Muskatal	Hungary	1:12:17.7	10 (2+3+3+2)	+22:34.7
	41	Klemen Bauer	Slovenia	DNF	(2+4)	
	67	Vladimir Iliev	Bulgaria	DNF	(2+0+2)	
	105	Ville Simola	Finland	DNF	(3)	
	106	Manuel Fernández Musso	Spain	DNF	(1)	
	133	Oskars Muižnieks	Latvia	DNF	(2+1+3)	
	113	Pedro Quintana Arias	Spain	DNS		
