= Freestyle skiing at the 2011 Asian Winter Games – Women's dual moguls =

Women's dual moguls at the 2011 Asian Winter Games
- Venue: Tabagan Sport and Recreation Complex
- Dates: 3 February 2011
- Competitors: 7 from 4 nations

Medalists
| gold medal | Yuliya Galysheva | Kazakhstan |
| silver medal | Yuliya Rodionova | Kazakhstan |
| bronze medal | Miki Ito | Japan |

The women's dual moguls at the 2011 Asian Winter Games was held on 3 February 2011 at Tabagan Sport and Recreation Complex in Almaty, Kazakhstan.

== Schedule ==
All times are Almaty Time (UTC+06:00)

| Date | Time | Event |
|---|---|---|
| Thursday, 3 February 2011 | 10:05 | Qualification |
| Thursday, 3 February 2011 | 11:05 | Quarterfinals |
| Thursday, 3 February 2011 | 11:05 | Semifinals |
| Thursday, 3 February 2011 | 11:05 | Finals |

== Results ==
=== Qualification ===
| Rank | Athlete | Score |
|---|---|---|
| 1 | Yuliya Rodionova (KAZ) | 21.61 |
| 2 | Yuliya Galysheva (KAZ) | 21.40 |
| 3 | Miki Ito (JPN) | 19.50 |
| 4 | Tae Satoya (JPN) | 18.25 |
| 5 | Seo Jung-hwa (KOR) | 18.17 |
| 6 | Ning Qin (CHN) | 17.72 |
| 7 | Li Nan (CHN) | 15.97 |

=== Knockout round ===
Quarterfinals
5 | Seo Jung-hwa (KOR) | 12
4 | Tae Satoya (JPN) | 23
3 | Miki Ito (JPN) | 30
6 | Ning Qin (CHN) | 5
7 | Li Nan (CHN) | 8
2 | Yuliya Galysheva (KAZ) | 27

Semifinals
1 | Yuliya Rodionova (KAZ) | 26
4 | Tae Satoya (JPN) | 9
3 | Miki Ito (JPN) | 12
2 | Yuliya Galysheva (KAZ) | 23

Final
1 | Yuliya Rodionova (KAZ) | 2
2 | Yuliya Galysheva (KAZ) | 33
Small final
4 | Tae Satoya (JPN) | 14
3 | Miki Ito (JPN) | 21
