= 2010–11 Biathlon World Cup – Sprint Men =

The 2010–11 Biathlon World Cup – Sprint Men will start on Saturday December 4, 2010 in Östersund and will finish on Thursday March 17, 2011 in Oslo. Defending titlist is Emil Hegle Svendsen of Norway.

== Competition format ==
The 10 kilometres (6,23 mi) sprint race is the third oldest biathlon event; the distance is skied over three laps. The biathlete shoots two times at any shooting lane, first prone, then standing, totalling 10 targets. For each missed target the biathlete has to complete a penalty lap of around 150 metres. Competitors' starts are staggered, normally by 30 seconds.

== 2009–10 Top 3 Standings ==
Medal	Athlete	Points
Gold:	(Norway) Emil Hegle Svendsen	354
Silver:	(Russia) Ivan Tcherezov	344
Bronze:	(Austria) Christoph Sumann	292

== Medal winners ==
Event:	Gold:	Time	Silver:	Time	Bronze:	Time
Östersund details	Emil Hegle Svendsen; Norway	25:01.9 (1+0)	Ole Einar Bjørndalen; Norway	25:05.8 (0+0)	Martin Fourcade; France	25:16.2 (0+0)
Hochfilzen details	Tarjei Bø; Norway	28:17.6 (0+0)	Serguei Sednev; Ukraine	28:45.1 (0+1)	Alexis Bœuf; France	28:50.9 (0+1)
Pokljuka details	Björn Ferry; Sweden	27:25.9 (0+0)	Tarjei Bø; Norway	27:31.0 (1+0)	Michael Greis; Germany	27:34.6 (0+0)
Oberhof details	Tarjei Bø; Norway	25:49.7 (0+1)	Arnd Peiffer; Germany	26:06.4 (0+1)	Michal Šlesingr; Czech Republic	26:10.4 (0+0)
Ruhpolding details	Lars Berger; Norway	23:55.1 (0+0)	Martin Fourcade; France	24:16.8 (0+0)	Ivan Tcherezov; Russia	24:18.9 (0+0)
Antholz details	Anton Shipulin; Russia	23:36.2 (0+0)	Michael Greis; Germany	23:46.2 (0+0)	Lars Berger; Norway	23:56.7 (0+1)
Presque Isle details	Arnd Peiffer; Germany	25:28.8 (0+0)	Martin Fourcade; France	25:44.7 (0+1)	Ivan Tcherezov; Russia	26:05.2 (0+0)
Fort Kent details	Emil Hegle Svendsen; Norway	24:51.4 (0+1)	Michal Šlesingr; Czech Republic	24:58.6 (0+0)	Tarjei Bø; Norway	25:00.7 (0+0)
World Championships 2011 details	Arnd Peiffer; Germany	24:34.0 (0+1)	Martin Fourcade; France	24:47.0 (2+0)	Tarjei Bø; Norway	24:59.2 (1+0)
Oslo details	Andreas Birnbacher; Germany	26:14.6 (0+0)	Björn Ferry; Sweden	26:24.8 (0+0)	Alexander Wolf; Germany	26:58.6 (0+0)

== Standings ==
#	Name	ÖST	HOC	POK	OBE	RUH	ANT	PRI	FRK	WCH	OSL	Total
1	Tarjei Bø (NOR)	40	60	54	60	40	0	43	48	48	0	393
2	Emil Hegle Svendsen (NOR)	60	43	24	34	43	27	—	60	40	38	369
3	Arnd Peiffer (GER)	28	10	23	54	28	36	60	—	60	34	333
4	Martin Fourcade (FRA)	48	3	25	0	54	20	54	43	54	6	307
5	Michael Greis (GER)	32	22	48	30	36	54	—	32	32	7	293
6	Ivan Tcherezov (RUS)	0	34	3	43	48	32	48	36	22	22	288
7	Lukas Hofer (ITA)	31	36	38	29	23	23	34	18	25	0	257
8	Lars Berger (NOR)	19	0	36	17	60	48	—	—	27	31	238
9	Andreas Birnbacher (GER)	36	0	29	0	—	—	28	28	38	60	219
10	Christoph Sumann (AUT)	0	26	22	26	38	31	—	22	14	36	215
11	Michal Šlesingr (CZE)	12	0	5	48	2	0	30	54	29	29	209
12	Simon Eder (AUT)	5	38	27	0	21	43	—	21	24	30	209
13	Björn Ferry (SWE)	0	30	60	11	34	0	0	—	18	54	207
14	Ole Einar Bjørndalen (NOR)	54	31	30	19	24	—	—	—	19	28	205
15	Carl Johan Bergman (SWE)	—	24	15	32	16	38	40	15	0	23	203
16	Serguei Sednev (UKR)	13	54	34	0	0	19	31	34	8	0	193
17	Andrei Makoveev (RUS)	—	—	32	40	19	0	22	24	43	0	180
18	Jakov Fak (SLO)	43	0	43	22	—	12	20	38	—	—	178
19	Evgeny Ustyugov (RUS)	25	32	40	28	25	—	—	—	12	15	177
20	Christoph Stephan (GER)	2	13	16	6	17	26	36	14	36	0	166
21	Anton Shipulin (RUS)	34	28	0	20	0	60	—	—	4	11	157
22	Alexis Bœuf (FRA)	26	48	0	0	13	0	32	29	0	0	148
23	Fredrik Lindström (SWE)	—	0	26	—	0	34	14	3	30	40	147
24	Christian De Lorenzi (ITA)	20	0	2	0	20	40	19	26	20	0	147
25	Markus Windisch (ITA)	6	0	—	23	0	25	38	25	23	3	143
26	Serhiy Semenov (UKR)	21	17	28	5	—	0	—	—	13	43	127
27	Klemen Bauer (SLO)	27	15	0	4	0	3	18	30	26	0	123
28	Maxim Tchoudov (RUS)	15	23	0	15	4	30	29	0	—	—	116
29	Vincent Jay (FRA)	0	19	21	0	30	17	27	0	0	0	114
30	Alexander Os (NOR)	38	0	0	24	8	0	4	27	—	9	110
31	Dominik Landertinger (AUT)	—	40	31	38	—	—	—	—	0	—	109
32	Simon Hallenbarter (SUI)	—	—	—	—	32	24	26	9	17	0	108
33	Tobias Eberhard (AUT)	0	7	17	8	27	22	0	0	—	24	105
34	Krasimir Anev (BUL)	17	29	14	—	0	16	—	—	—	18	94
35	Tim Burke (USA)	23	18	6	10	0	7	—	0	10	20	94
36	Lois Habert (FRA)	24	0	0	31	14	5	0	17	0	0	91
37	Alexander Wolf (GER)	16	8	4	0	0	0	0	9	—	48	85
38	Daniel Böhm (GER)	—	—	—	—	29	14	0	40	—	0	83
39	Simon Fourcade (FRA)	0	0	—	0	26	8	12	4	28	0	78
40	Benjamin Weger (SUI)	1	0	0	36	0	0	17	20	0	0	74
41	Daniel Mesotitsch (AUT)	9	27	0	0	—	0	—	—	3	32	71
42	Andriy Deryzemlya (UKR)	31	0	0	0	9	0	—	—	31	0	71
43	Julian Eberhard (AUT)	—	—	—	—	—	—	21	31	—	19	71
44	Lowell Bailey (USA)	3	0	0	0	0	29	16	10	9	0	67
45	Jean-Philippe Leguellec (CAN)	22	14	0	25	0	—	1	5	0	—	67
46	Tomasz Sikora (POL)	11	9	20	—	—	0	23	0	—	—	63
47	Matthias Simmen (SUI)	0	25	0	16	2	9	2	0	6	0	60
48	Ondřej Moravec (CZE)	0	0	8	0	22	15	—	—	0	12	57
49	Jaroslav Soukup (CZE)	0	2	0	3	15	11	9	13	0	0	53
50	Brendan Green (CAN)	0	6	12	27	0	—	7	0	0	0	52
51	Ilmārs Bricis (LAT)	18	—	0	—	0	0	—	—	21	13	52
52	Maxim Maksimov (RUS)	7	0	0	—	—	—	25	19	—	0	51
53	Mattias Nilsson (SWE)	29	0	0	21	0	—	—	—	—	—	50
54	Jean-Guillaume Béatrix (FRA)	—	11	0	—	—	4	11	23	—	0	49
55	Edgars Piksons (LAT)	0	0	—	0	7	—	—	—	34	0	41
56	Andrejs Rastorgujevs (LAT)	0	0	—	1	18	21	—	—	0	0	40
57	Pavol Hurajt (SVK)	0	12	0	0	0	0	—	—	0	26	38
58	Evgeny Abramenko (BLR)	14	0	13	0	0	1	—	—	0	10	38
59	Rune Brattsveen (NOR)	—	—	0	0	—	—	0	16	—	21	37
60	Roland Lessing (EST)	0	16	9	12	—	0	—	—	—	—	37
61	Tomáš Holubec (CZE)	4	0	—	—	31	0	0	0	—	—	35
62	Olexander Bilanenko (UKR)	0	—	0	2	—	0	—	—	16	17	35
63	Janez Marič (SLO)	0	0	0	14	—	0	0	7	0	14	35
64	Scott Perras (CAN)	—	0	10	7	0	—	0	11	7	0	35
65	Michail Kletcherov (BUL)	—	0	7	0	3	18	0	6	0	0	34
66	Timo Antila (FIN)	—	0	18	0	0	10	—	—	2	—	30
67	Evgeniy Garanichev (RUS)	—	—	—	—	—	28	—	—	—	—	28
68	Matej Kazar (SVK)	8	20	—	—	—	0	—	—	0	0	28
69	Florian Graf (GER)	—	—	0	—	—	—	—	—	—	27	27
70	Artem Pryma (UKR)	—	—	—	—	0	—	—	—	—	26	26
71	Henrik L'Abée-Lund (NOR)	—	—	—	—	—	—	24	0	—	0	24
72	Jarkko Kauppinen (FIN)	—	0	11	0	12	0	0	0	0	0	23
73	Zdeněk Vítek (CZE)	0	21	0	0	—	—	—	—	1	0	22
74	Roman Pryma (UKR)	—	0	—	0	0	—	10	12	—	—	22
75	Thomas Frei (SUI)	0	0	—	—	—	13	8	0	—	—	21
76	Christian Stebler (SUI)	0	0	0	0	5	—	15	0	0	0	20
77	Yan Savitskiy (KAZ)	0	0	19	—	—	0	—	—	—	—	19
78	Alexey Churine (RUS)	—	—	—	18	0	—	0	0	—	—	18
79	Sergey Novikov (BLR)	0	0	0	0	—	0	0	0	—	16	16
80	Leif Nordgren (USA)	0	0	0	0	0	0	0	0	15	0	15
81	Friedrich Pinter (AUT)	0	0	—	13	0	2	0	0	—	—	15
82	Alexey Volkov (RUS)	10	0	—	—	—	—	—	—	—	4	14
83	Vasja Rupnik (SLO)	0	0	0	0	0	6	—	—	0	8	14
84	Jay Hakkinen (USA)	—	—	—	—	—	0	13	0	0	0	13
85	Junji Nagai (JPN)	—	0	1	0	11	0	—	—	0	0	12
86	Alexsandr Chervyhkov (KAZ)	0	0	—	—	0	0	—	—	11	—	11
87	Toni Lang (GER)	—	—	—	—	11	0	—	—	—	—	11
88	Paavo Puurunen (FIN)	—	5	—	—	0	0	—	—	5	—	10
89	Magnús Jónsson (SWE)	0	0	0	9	0	0	0	—	0	0	9
90	Oleksandr Batiuk (UKR)	0	4	—	—	0	—	5	0	—	—	9
91	Indrek Tobreluts (EST)	0	0	—	0	6	0	—	—	0	0	6
92	Sven Grossegger (AUT)	—	—	—	—	—	—	6	0	—	—	6
93	Rene Laurent Vuillermoz (ITA)	—	0	—	0	0	—	4	2	0	—	6
94	Vladimir Chepelin (BLR)	—	—	0	0	0	—	—	—	0	5	5
95	Ren Long (CHN)	—	—	0	0	0	—	—	—	0	2	2
96	Vitaliy Kilchytskyy (UKR)	—	—	—	—	—	—	0	1	—	—	2
97	Zhang Chengye (CHN)	0	1	—	—	—	—	—	—	—	—	1
98	Erik Lesser (GER)	—	—	—	—	—	—	—	—	—	1	1
