= Biathlon at the 2011 Asian Winter Games – Men's sprint =

Men's 10 kilometre sprint at the 2011 Asian Winter Games
- Venue: Biathlon and Cross-Country Ski Complex
- Dates: 1 February 2011
- Competitors: 14 from 7 nations

Medalists
gold medal	Alexandr Chervyakov	Kazakhstan
silver medal	Ren Long	China
bronze medal	Junji Nagai	Japan

The men's 10 kilometre sprint at the 2011 Asian Winter Games was held on February 1, 2011 at Biathlon and Cross-Country Ski Complex, Almaty.

== Schedule ==
All times are Almaty Time (UTC+06:00)

Date	Time	Event
Tuesday, 1 February 2011	13:30	Final

== Results ==
Rank	Athlete	Penalties			Time
Rank	Athlete	P	S	Total	Time
1st place, gold medalist(s)	Alexandr Chervyakov (KAZ)	0	2	2	29:01.6
2nd place, silver medalist(s)	Ren Long (CHN)	0	0	0	29:07.9
3rd place, bronze medalist(s)	Junji Nagai (JPN)	0	1	1	29:35.1
4	Zhang Chengye (CHN)	1	2	3	30:00.7
5	Kazuya Inomata (JPN)	2	2	4	30:15.6
6	Dias Keneshev (KAZ)	1	3	4	30:57.4
7	Lee In-bok (KOR)	2	2	4	31:35.9
8	Lee Su-young (KOR)	1	2	3	32:33.5
9	Murod Hodjibayev (UZB)	2	2	4	35:21.3
10	Anuzar Yunusov (UZB)	1	2	3	35:52.4
11	Zafar Shakhmuratov (KGZ)	3	1	4	41:53.6
12	Azamat Bojokoev (KGZ)	5	5	10	48:23.4
13	Wang Yao-yi (TPE)	1	2	3	50:18.1
14	Liu Yung-chien (TPE)	1	3	4	1:08:07.0
