= Biathlon at the 2011 Asian Winter Games – Men's individual =

Men's 20 kilometre individual at the 2011 Asian Winter Games
- Venue: Biathlon and Cross-Country Ski Complex
- Dates: 4 February 2011
- Competitors: 13 from 7 nations

Medalists
gold medal	Junji Nagai	Japan
silver medal	Ren Long	China
bronze medal	Li Zhonghai	China

The men's 20 kilometre individual at the 2011 Asian Winter Games was held on February 4, 2011 at Biathlon and Cross-Country Ski Complex, Almaty.

== Schedule ==
All times are Almaty Time (UTC+06:00)

Date	Time	Event
Friday, 4 February 2011	13:00	Final

== Results ==
Legend

- DNS — Did not start

Rank	Athlete	Ski time	Penalties					Time
Rank	Athlete	Ski time	P	S	P	S	Total	Time
1st place, gold medalist(s)	Junji Nagai (JPN)	58:41.2	0	1	0	1	2	1:00:41.2
2nd place, silver medalist(s)	Ren Long (CHN)	1:00:54.0	0	0	0	1	1	1:01:54.0
3rd place, bronze medalist(s)	Li Zhonghai (CHN)	59:54.3	1	1	1	0	3	1:02:54.3
4	Jun Je-uk (KOR)	1:03:19.7	1	1	0	0	2	1:05:19.7
5	Lee In-bok (KOR)	1:02:53.6	1	0	1	1	3	1:05:53.6
6	Nikolay Braichenko (KAZ)	59:55.1	2	1	1	2	6	1:05:55.1
7	Alexandr Chervyakov (KAZ)	59:04.7	1	2	1	3	7	1:06:04.7
8	Hidenori Isa (JPN)	1:00:37.5	0	3	0	3	6	1:06:37.5
9	Murod Hodjibayev (UZB)	1:07:43.2	2	0	1	3	6	1:13:43.2
10	Anuzar Yunusov (UZB)	1:11:42.6	3	2	1	4	10	1:21:42.6
11	Zafar Shakhmuratov (KGZ)	1:18:26.0	3	2	3	4	12	1:30:26.0
—	Wang Yao-yi (TPE)							DNS
—	Liu Yung-chien (TPE)							DNS
