= Li Nan =

Li Nan may refer to:

- Li Nan (actor), Chinese actor in the 1998 TV series My Fair Princess
- Li Nan (basketball) (born 1974), Chinese basketball coach and former player
- Li Nan (footballer), Chinese female footballer in 2005 AFC U-17 Women's Championship
- Li Nan (freestyle skier), Chinese freestyle skier participated in the freestyle skiing at the 2011 Asian Winter Games
- Li Nan (table tennis) (born 1982), Chinese female table tennis player

== See also ==
- Linan, Fujian (鲤南镇), a town in Xianyou County, Fujian Province
