= Biathlon at the 2011 Asian Winter Games – Men's pursuit =

Men's 12.5 kilometre pursuit at the 2011 Asian Winter Games
- Venue: Biathlon and Cross-Country Ski Complex
- Dates: 2 February 2011
- Competitors: 14 from 7 nations

Medalists
gold medal	Alexandr Chervyakov	Kazakhstan
silver medal	Junji Nagai	Japan
bronze medal	Ren Long	China

The men's 12.5 kilometre pursuit at the 2011 Asian Winter Games was held on February 2, 2011 at Biathlon and Cross-Country Ski Complex, Almaty.

== Schedule ==
All times are Almaty Time (UTC+06:00)

Date	Time	Event
Wednesday, 2 February 2011	10:00	Final

== Results ==
Legend

- DNS — Did not start

Rank	Athlete	Start	Penalties					Time
Rank	Athlete	Start	P	P	S	S	Total	Time
1st place, gold medalist(s)	Alexandr Chervyakov (KAZ)	0:00	1	0	3	1	5	35:42.8
2nd place, silver medalist(s)	Junji Nagai (JPN)	0:34	0	0	3	1	4	36:17.2
3rd place, bronze medalist(s)	Ren Long (CHN)	0:06	1	2	1	0	4	36:41.5
4	Kazuya Inomata (JPN)	1:14	1	0	1	2	4	37:09.2
5	Zhang Chengye (CHN)	0:59	0	0	4	2	6	37:58.8
6	Dias Keneshev (KAZ)	1:56	0	0	2	1	3	38:14.0
7	Lee Su-young (KOR)	3:32	0	1	4	4	9	44:00.7
—	Murod Hodjibayev (UZB)	6:20	4	2	2	3	11	Lapped
—	Anuzar Yunusov (UZB)	6:51	4	3	2	2	11	Lapped
—	Zafar Shakhmuratov (KGZ)	12:52	4	3	1			Lapped
—	Azamat Bojokoev (KGZ)	19:22	2	3	4			Lapped
—	Wang Yao-yi (TPE)	21:17	2	3	3			Lapped
—	Lee In-bok (KOR)	2:34						DNS
—	Liu Yung-chien (TPE)	39:05						DNS
