= Biathlon at the 2014 Winter Olympics – Men's individual =

Men's individual at the XXII Olympic Winter Games
- Pictogram for biathlon
- Venue: Laura Biathlon & Ski Complex
- Date: 13 February 2014
- Competitors: 89 from 31 nations
- Winning time: 49:31.7

Medalists
1st place, gold medalist(s)		Martin Fourcade	France
2nd place, silver medalist(s)		Erik Lesser	Germany
3rd place, bronze medalist(s)		Evgeniy Garanichev	Russia

The men's individual competition of the Sochi 2014 Olympics was held at Laura Biathlon & Ski Complex on 13 February 2014. The gold medal was won by Martin Fourcade, France, the silver medal by Erik Lesser, Germany and the bronze medal was won by Evgeniy Garanichev, Russia.

== Qualification ==
Countries were assigned quotas using a combination of the Nation Cup scores of their top three athletes in the individual, sprint, and relay competitions at the 2012 World Championships in Ruhpolding, Germany, and the 2013 World Championships in Nové Město na Moravě, Czech Republic. The top 20 nations would be able to start four athletes in the individual competition, while nations 21 through 28 could start one each. Nations below 28 could only start if any nation decided to vacate a quota spot.

During the 2012–13 or 2013–14 Biathlon World Cup season the athlete needed two results at IBU Cup, Open European Championships, World Championships or World Cup in the Sprint or Individual that at a maximum 20% behind the average time of the top three athletes. Or, two placings in the top half at the Junior World Championships. They could also have a combination of both criteria (one of each).

== Schedule ==
All times are (UTC+4).

Date	Time	Round
13 February	18:00–19:40	Final

== Results ==
The race was started at 18:00.

Rank	Bib	Name	Country	Time	Penalties (P+S+P+S)	Deficit
1st place, gold medalist(s)	31	Martin Fourcade	France	49:31.7	1 ( 0+1+0+0 )	—
2nd place, silver medalist(s)	41	Erik Lesser	Germany	49:43.9	0 ( 0+0+0+0 )	+12.2
3rd place, bronze medalist(s)	1	Evgeniy Garanichev	Russia	50:06.2	1 ( 0+1+0+0 )	+34.5
4	16	Simon Eder	Austria	50:09.5	1 ( 0+1+0+0 )	+37.8
5	19	Dominik Landertinger	Austria	50:14.2	0 ( 0+0+0+0 )	+42.5
6	21	Jean-Guillaume Béatrix	France	50:15.5	1 ( 0+0+0+1 )	+43.8
7	9	Emil Hegle Svendsen	Norway	50:30.3	1 ( 0+0+1+0 )	+58.6
8	58	Lowell Bailey	United States	50:57.4	1 ( 0+1+0+0 )	+1:25.7
9	26	Serhiy Semenov	Ukraine	51:07.9	1 ( 1+0+0+0 )	+1:36.2
10	60	Daniel Böhm	Germany	51:09.4	1 ( 0+1+0+0 )	+1:37.7
11	52	Johannes Thingnes Bø	Norway	51:16.5	1 ( 0+1+0+0 )	+1:44.8
12	38	Björn Ferry	Sweden	51:18.3	1 ( 0+0+1+0 )	+1:46.6
13	35	Simon Fourcade	France	51:29.9	2 ( 0+2+0+0 )	+1:58.2
14	12	Lukas Hofer	Italy	51:34.6	2 ( 0+1+0+1 )	+2:02.9
15	20	Fredrik Lindström	Sweden	51:50.2	2 ( 0+1+0+1 )	+2:18.5
16	24	Simon Schempp	Germany	51:50.3	1 ( 0+1+0+0 )	+2:18.6
17	8	Jaroslav Soukup	Czech Republic	51:55.1	1 ( 1+0+0+0 )	+2:23.4
18	25	Ondřej Moravec	Czech Republic	51:55.8	2 ( 1+0+0+1 )	+2:24.1
19	40	Matej Kazár	Slovakia	51:56.9	2 ( 1+0+1+0 )	+2:25.2
20	23	Yan Savitskiy	Kazakhstan	52:00.0	1 ( 0+1+0+0 )	+2:28.3
21	69	Brendan Green	Canada	52:05.3	2 ( 0+1+1+0 )	+2:33.6
22	7	Andreas Birnbacher	Germany	52:17.9	2 ( 1+0+0+1 )	+2:46.2
23	10	Tomas Kaukėnas	Lithuania	52:38.9	3 ( 0+0+0+3 )	+3:07.2
24	46	Christoph Sumann	Austria	52:39.1	1 ( 0+1+0+0 )	+3:07.4
25	14	Nathan Smith	Canada	52:41.3	3 ( 0+2+0+1 )	+3:09.6
26	36	Tarjei Bø	Norway	52:41.5	2 ( 0+2+0+0 )	+3:09.8
27	45	Anton Pantov	Kazakhstan	52:51.5	0 ( 0+0+0+0 )	+3:19.8
28	22	Pavol Hurajt	Slovakia	52:53.3	1 ( 0+1+0+0 )	+3:21.6
29	11	Indrek Tobreluts	Estonia	53:02.5	2 ( 0+1+0+1 )	+3:30.8
30	63	Christian De Lorenzi	Italy	53:13.1	2 ( 1+0+0+1 )	+3:41.4
31	4	Jakov Fak	Slovenia	53:17.6	4 ( 1+0+1+2 )	+3:45.9
32	27	Andrejs Rastorgujevs	Latvia	53:18.9	3 ( 0+1+0+2 )	+3:47.2
33	15	Ole Einar Bjørndalen	Norway	53:21.9	4 ( 1+1+1+1 )	+3:50.2
34	56	Jean-Philippe Leguellec	Canada	53:25.5	2 ( 0+1+0+1 )	+3:53.8
35	32	Krasimir Anev	Bulgaria	53:30.3	2 ( 0+0+2+0 )	+3:58.6
36	72	Carl Johan Bergman	Sweden	53:37.5	3 ( 1+0+0+2 )	+4:05.8
37	48	Evgeny Ustyugov	Russia	~~53:47.8~~ DSQ	3 ( 2+0+0+1 )	+4:16.1
38	49	Vladimir Iliev	Bulgaria	53:52.6	3 ( 2+0+0+1 )	+4:20.9
39	75	Daniel Mesotitsch	Austria	53:53.3	3 ( 2+0+1+0 )	+4:21.6
40	80	Tobias Arwidson	Sweden	54:03.0	1 ( 1+0+0+0 )	+4:31.3
41	28	Lee-Steve Jackson	Great Britain	54:11.3	1 ( 0+0+0+1 )	+4:39.6
42	82	Tomáš Hasilla	Slovakia	54:16.9	2 ( 1+1+0+0 )	+4:45.2
43	29	Tim Burke	United States	54:21.2	4 ( 0+2+0+2 )	+4:49.5
44	6	Alexei Almoukov	Australia	54:35.4	2 ( 0+0+0+2 )	+5:03.7
45	53	Andriy Deryzemlya	Ukraine	54:40.0	3 ( 0+2+1+0 )	+5:08.3
46	83	Simon Hallenbarter	Switzerland	54:52.2	1 ( 1+0+0+0 )	+5:20.5
47	13	Benjamin Weger	Switzerland	54:54.5	4 ( 1+1+1+1 )	+5:22.8
48	5	Vladimir Chepelin	Belarus	54:59.2	3 ( 1+1+0+1 )	+5:27.5
49	79	Russell Currier	United States	55:07.5	4 ( 2+2+0+0 )	+5:35.8
50	3	Łukasz Szczurek	Poland	55:18.6	1 ( 0+0+1+0 )	+5:46.9
51	42	Klemen Bauer	Slovenia	55:29.1	5 ( 2+0+1+2 )	+5:57.4
52	68	Evgeny Abramenko	Belarus	55:38.8	3 ( 1+1+1+0 )	+6:07.1
53	44	Sergey Novikov	Belarus	55:41.7	2 ( 0+1+1+0 )	+6:10.0
54	77	Dmytro Pidruchnyi	Ukraine	55:53.4	3 ( 1+0+1+1 )	+6:21.7
55	37	Ahti Toivanen	Finland	55:55.4	3 ( 1+0+1+1 )	+6:23.7
56	55	Michal Šlesingr	Czech Republic	55:57.9	2 ( 1+0+0+1 )	+6:26.2
57	66	Miroslav Matiaško	Slovakia	55:58.7	4 ( 1+1+0+2 )	+6:27.0
58	81	Scott Perras	Canada	56:04.3	4 ( 0+3+1+0 )	+6:32.6
59	47	Cornel Puchianu	Romania	56:10.4	4 ( 0+0+1+3 )	+6:38.7
60	61	Michal Krčmář	Czech Republic	56:14.1	3 ( 1+1+1+0 )	+6:42.4
61	64	Daniil Steptšenko	Estonia	56:14.4	3 ( 1+2+0+0 )	+6:42.7
62	65	Janez Marič	Slovenia	56:22.4	3 ( 1+1+0+1 )	+6:50.7
63	71	Alexey Volkov	Russia	56:30.3	4 ( 1+1+1+1 )	+6:58.6
64	57	Dominik Windisch	Italy	56:31.4	6 ( 1+1+1+3 )	+6:59.7
65	34	Ren Long	China	56:35.8	4 ( 1+2+0+1 )	+7:04.1
66	59	Ivan Joller	Switzerland	56:40.6	3 ( 0+1+1+1 )	+7:08.9
67	70	Michail Kletcherov	Bulgaria	56:41.8	2 ( 0+0+1+1 )	+7:10.1
68	18	Milanko Petrović	Serbia	56:45.4	6 ( 1+2+0+3 )	+7:13.7
69	85	Kalev Ermits	Estonia	57:04.5	2 ( 1+1+0+0 )	+7:32.8
70	78	Markus Windisch	Italy	57:18.5	4 ( 0+2+1+1 )	+7:46.8
71	17	Victor Lobo Escolar	Spain	57:22.8	3 ( 0+2+0+1 )	+7:51.1
72	33	Lee In-Bok	South Korea	57:29.0	1 ( 0+1+0+0 )	+7:57.3
73	88	Peter Dokl	Slovenia	57:51.5	3 ( 0+2+0+1 )	+8:19.8
74	87	Miroslav Kenanov	Bulgaria	58:01.1	1 ( 0+0+1+0 )	+8:29.4
75	76	Sergey Naumik	Kazakhstan	58:03.2	5 ( 0+1+2+2 )	+8:31.5
76	39	Krzysztof Pływaczyk	Poland	58:12.5	5 ( 3+0+1+1 )	+8:40.8
77	51	Kauri Kõiv	Estonia	58:17.3	7 ( 1+2+2+2 )	+8:45.6
78	54	Claudio Böckli	Switzerland	58:19.2	4 ( 1+1+0+2 )	+8:47.5
79	89	Aliaksandr Darozhka	Belarus	58:27.7	5 ( 2+0+2+1 )	+8:56.0
80	74	Artem Pryma	Ukraine	58:35.2	7 ( 3+1+0+3 )	+9:03.5
81	67	Alexis Bœuf	France	58:39.0	4 ( 1+1+1+1 )	+9:07.3
82	62	Leif Nordgren	United States	58:47.6	6 ( 1+0+5+0 )	+9:15.9
83	30	Hidenori Isa	Japan	58:56.1	6 ( 2+1+1+2 )	+9:24.4
84	84	Alexandr Trifonov	Kazakhstan	1:00:08.9	5 ( 1+1+2+1 )	+10:37.2
85	86	Grzegorz Guzik	Poland	1:00:20.7	4 ( 1+2+0+1 )	+10:49.0
86	73	Łukasz Słonina	Poland	1:00:29.5	3 ( 0+2+0+1 )	+10:57.8
87	43	Károly Gombos	Hungary	1:05:16.7	8 ( 0+4+1+3 )	+15:45.0
	2	Jarkko Kauppinen	Finland	DNF	5 ( 3+2 )	
DSQ	50	Alexander Loginov	Russia	53:04.3	2 ( 0+1+1+0 )	+3:32.6
