= Biathlon at the 2011 Asian Winter Games – Men's relay =

Men's 4 × 7.5 kilometre relay at the 2011 Asian Winter Games
- Venue: Biathlon and Cross-Country Ski Complex
- Dates: 6 February 2011
- Competitors: 16 from 4 nations

Medalists
gold medal	Kazakhstan; Alexandr Chervyakov, Nikolay Braichenko, Yan Savitskiy, Dias Keneshev
silver medal	Japan; Junji Nagai, Hidenori Isa, Kazuya Inomata, Satoru Abo
bronze medal	China; Ren Long, Zhang Chengye, Chen Haibin, Li Zhonghai

The men's 4×7.5 kilometre relay at the 2011 Asian Winter Games was held on February 6, 2011, at Biathlon and Cross-Country Ski Complex, Almaty.

== Schedule ==
All times are Almaty Time (UTC+06:00)

Date	Time	Event
Sunday, 6 February 2011	10:00	Final

== Results ==
Rank	Team	Penalties			Time
Rank	Team	P	S	Total	Time
1st place, gold medalist(s)	Kazakhstan (KAZ)	0+4	0+3	0+7	1:21:03.5
	Alexandr Chervyakov	0+0	0+0	0+0	19:37.2
	Nikolay Braichenko	0+1	0+0	0+1	20:04.2
	Yan Savitskiy	0+1	0+3	0+4	20:11.6
	Dias Keneshev	0+2	0+0	0+2	21:10.5
2nd place, silver medalist(s)	Japan (JPN)	0+4	1+6	1+10	1:23:22.0
	Junji Nagai	0+0	1+3	1+3	20:29.7
	Hidenori Isa	0+0	0+1	0+1	20:21.1
	Kazuya Inomata	0+3	0+1	0+4	20:50.2
	Satoru Abo	0+1	0+1	0+2	21:41.0
3rd place, bronze medalist(s)	China (CHN)	0+6	1+10	1+16	1:26:12.1
	Ren Long	0+1	0+2	0+3	20:56.2
	Zhang Chengye	0+1	0+3	0+4	20:57.3
	Chen Haibin	0+2	1+3	1+5	21:56.2
	Li Zhonghai	0+2	0+2	0+4	22:22.4
4	South Korea (KOR)	1+8	6+7	7+15	1:31:13.0
	Jun Je-uk	0+2	0+0	0+2	20:48.1
	Lee In-bok	0+3	0+1	0+4	21:18.3
	Lee Su-young	1+3	3+3	4+6	24:27.1
	Lee Jung-sik	0+0	3+3	3+3	24:39.5
