= Figure skating at the 2011 Asian Winter Games – Ice dance =

Ice dance at the 2011 Asian Winter Games
- Venue: Saryarka Velodrome
- Dates: 3–5 February 2011
- Competitors: 10 from 4 nations

Medalists
gold medal	Zheng Xun; Huang Xintong	China
silver medal	Chris Reed; Cathy Reed	Japan
bronze medal	Wang Chen; Yu Xiaoyang	China

The Pair Ice dancing event was held over two days. On February 3 at 16:00 the short program was held while the free skating took place on February 5 at 19:00.

== Schedule ==
All times are Almaty Time (UTC+06:00)

Date	Time	Event
Thursday, 3 February 2011	16:00	Short dance
Saturday, 5 February 2011	19:00	Free dance

== Results ==
Rank	Team	SD	FD	Total
1st place, gold medalist(s)	China (CHN); Zheng Xun; Huang Xintong	53.11	76.64	129.75
2nd place, silver medalist(s)	Japan (JPN); Chris Reed; Cathy Reed	50.97	77.31	128.28
3rd place, bronze medalist(s)	China (CHN); Wang Chen; Yu Xiaoyang	50.70	76.80	127.50
4	Kazakhstan (KAZ); Viktor Adoniev; Viktoriya Kucherenko	36.22	66.52	102.74
5	North Korea (PRK); Choe Min; Hong Ye-gyong	31.43	49.32	80.75
