= Figure skating at the 2011 Asian Winter Games – Women's singles =

Women's singles at the 2011 Asian Winter Games
- Venue: Saryarka Velodrome
- Dates: 4–5 February 2011
- Competitors: 17 from 10 nations

Medalists
gold medal	Kanako Murakami	Japan
silver medal	Haruka Imai	Japan
bronze medal	Kwak Min-jeong	South Korea

The women's singles event was held over two days. On February 4 at 15:00 the short program was held while the free skating took place on February 5 at 15:00.

== Schedule ==
All times are Almaty Time (UTC+06:00)

Date	Time	Event
Friday, 4 February 2011	15:00	Short program
Saturday, 5 February 2011	15:00	Free skating

== Results ==
Legend

- WD — Withdrawn

Rank	Athlete	SP	FS	Total
1st place, gold medalist(s)	Kanako Murakami (JPN)	54.48	122.56	177.04
2nd place, silver medalist(s)	Haruka Imai (JPN)	54.02	112.98	167.00
3rd place, bronze medalist(s)	Kwak Min-jeong (KOR)	52.65	95.30	147.95
4	Zhang Kexin (CHN)	47.74	94.28	142.02
5	Geng Bingwa (CHN)	47.18	93.86	141.04
6	Kim Chae-hwa (KOR)	45.74	81.74	127.48
7	Zhaira Costiniano (PHI)	41.27	80.83	122.10
8	Kristina Prilepko (KAZ)	36.23	72.36	108.59
9	Mimi Tanasorn Chindasook (THA)	40.55	66.47	107.02
10	Sandra Khopon (THA)	34.46	62.90	97.36
11	Mericien Venzon (PHI)	31.95	61.69	93.64
12	Liu Chao-chih (TPE)	30.39	61.83	92.22
13	Amanda Sunyoto-Yang (TPE)	28.17	57.80	85.97
14	Marina Shishkina (KAZ)	25.61	59.06	84.67
15	Ching Siau Chian (MAS)	22.33	45.66	67.99
16	Gansükhiin Maral-Erdene (MGL)	19.09	41.25	60.34
—	Anastasia Gimazetdinova (UZB)	40.59		WD
