= Biathlon World Championships 2012 – Men's mass start =

Men's mass start at the Biathlon World Championships 2012
- Date: 11 March 2012
- Competitors: 30 from 13 nations
- Winning time: 38:25.4

Medalists
gold medal	Martin Fourcade	France
silver medal	Björn Ferry	Sweden
bronze medal	Fredrik Lindström	Sweden

The men's mass start competition of the Biathlon World Championships 2012 was held on March 11, 2012 at 13:30 local time.

== Results ==
The race started at 13:30.

Rank	Bib	Name	Country	Penalties (P+P+S+S)	Time	Deficit
1st place, gold medalist(s)	1	Martin Fourcade	France	2 (0+1+1+0)	38:25.4	
2nd place, silver medalist(s)	20	Björn Ferry	Sweden	0 (0+0+0+0)	38:28.4	+3.0
3rd place, bronze medalist(s)	17	Fredrik Lindström	Sweden	2 (0+1+1+0)	38:28.8	+3.4
4	7	Andreas Birnbacher	Germany	1 (0+0+0+1)	38:30.0	+4.6
5	4	Simon Fourcade	France	2 (1+0+1+0)	38:35.2	+9.8
6	3	Carl Johan Bergman	Sweden	1 (0+0+1+0)	38:39.0	+13.6
7	9	Arnd Peiffer	Germany	2 (0+0+1+1)	38:45.7	+20.3
8	12	Ole Einar Bjørndalen	Norway	2 (0+0+1+1)	38:49.4	+24.0
9	15	Evgeniy Garanichev	Russia	1 (0+0+0+1)	38:52.2	+26.8
10	13	Evgeny Ustyugov	Russia	2 (2+0+0+0)	38:59.8	+34.4
11	6	Jaroslav Soukup	Czech Republic	2 (0+1+0+1)	39:02.9	+37.5
12	19	Michal Šlesingr	Czech Republic	2 (1+0+1+0)	39:08.3	+42.9
13	18	Ondřej Moravec	Czech Republic	3 (0+1+1+1)	39:18.7	+53.3
14	16	Daniel Mesotitsch	Austria	2 (1+0+1+0)	39:26.9	+1:01.5
15	25	Alexis Bœuf	France	3 (1+0+0+2)	39:30.8	+1:05.4
16	24	Lukas Hofer	Italy	3 (0+0+1+2)	39:37.8	+1:12.4
17	8	Tarjei Bø	Norway	3 (0+0+2+1)	39:40.8	+1:15.4
18	2	Emil Hegle Svendsen	Norway	5 (2+0+1+2)	39:41.0	1:15.6
19	30	Andriy Deryzemlya	Ukraine	3 (0+0+3+0)	39:42.3	+1:16.9
20	22	Markus Windisch	Italy	4 (0+1+2+1)	39:44.0	+1:18.6
21	27	Klemen Bauer	Slovenia	4 (1+1+1+1)	40:02.7	+1:37.3
22	23	Michael Greis	Germany	4 (0+0+2+2)	40:04.8	+1:39.4
23	29	Tim Burke	United States	4 (2+1+1+0)	40:07.9	+1:42.5
24	28	Dominik Landertinger	Austria	3 (1+0+2+0)	40:09.2	+1:43.8
25	14	Lowell Bailey	United States	5 (0+1+3+1)	40:17.6	+1:52.2
26	26	Simon Schempp	Germany	5 (1+0+3+1	40:22.0	+1:56.6
27	21	Sergey Novikov	Belarus	5 (1+0+1+3)	40:46.3	+2:20.9
28	11	Andrei Makoveev	Russia	5 (2+2+1+0)	41:10.8	+2:45.4
29	5	Anton Shipulin	Russia	3 (0+0+1+2)	41:33.5	+3:08.1
30	10	Benjamin Weger	Switzerland	1 (1+ + +)	DNF	
