= Thailand at the 2007 Asian Winter Games =

- IOC code: THA
- NOC: National Olympic Committee of Thailand
- Website: www.olympicthai.or.th/eng (in English and Thai)

in Changchun
- Competitors: 23

Asian Winter Games appearances
- 1996; 1999; 2003; 2007; 2011; 2017; 2025; 2029

Thailand participated in the 2007 Asian Winter Games which were held in Changchun, China from January 28, 2007, to February 4, 2007.
