= Freestyle skiing at the 2011 Asian Winter Games – Women's aerials =

Women's aerials at the 2011 Asian Winter Games
- Venue: Tabagan Sport and Recreation Complex
- Dates: 1 February 2011
- Competitors: 6 from 3 nations

Medalists
gold medal	Zhang Xin	China
silver medal	Zhibek Arapbayeva	Kazakhstan
bronze medal	Yang Yu	China

The women's aerials at the 2011 Asian Winter Games was held on 1 February 2011 at Tabagan Sport and Recreation Complex in Almaty, Kazakhstan.

== Schedule ==
All times are Almaty Time (UTC+06:00)

Date	Time	Event
Tuesday, 1 February 2011	10:05	Final

== Results ==
Legend

- DNS — Did not start

Rank	Athlete	Jump 1	Jump 2	Total
1st place, gold medalist(s)	Zhang Xin (CHN)	77.43	74.02	151.45
2nd place, silver medalist(s)	Zhibek Arapbayeva (KAZ)	54.94	54.99	109.93
3rd place, bronze medalist(s)	Yang Yu (CHN)	44.95	64.61	109.56
4	Akhmarzhan Kalmurzayeva (KAZ)	53.50	0.00	53.50
—	Jargalsürengiin Tögszayaa (MGL)			DNS
—	Altanzulyn Ariunzayaa (MGL)			DNS
