= Thailand at the 2011 Asian Winter Games =

- IOC code: THA
- NOC: National Olympic Committee of Thailand
- Website: www.olympicthai.or.th/eng (in English and Thai)

in Astana and Almaty
- Competitors: 25 in 2 sports
- Medals Ranked 9th: Gold 0 Silver 0 Bronze 0 Total 0

Asian Winter Games appearances
- 1996; 1999; 2003; 2007; 2011; 2017; 2025; 2029

Thailand will participate in the 2011 Asian Winter Games in Almaty and Astana, Kazakhstan from January 30, 2011 to February 6, 2011.

== Figure skating ==
Men

Athlete(s)	Event	SP/SP		FS/LP		Total	
Athlete(s)	Event	Points	Rank	Points	Rank	Points	Rank
Karn Luanpreda	Men's	23.22	14	48.27	14	71.49	14

Women

Athlete(s)	Event	SP/SP		FS/LP		Total	
Athlete(s)	Event	Points	Rank	Points	Rank	Points	Rank
Tanasorn Chindasook	Women's	40.55	9	66.47	9	107.02	9
Sandra Khopon	Women's	34.46	11	62.90	10	97.36	10

== Ice hockey ==
Men

The team is in the premier division for these games.

=== Premier Division ===
Rank	Team	Pld	W	OW	OL	L	GF	GA	GD	Pts
6	Kyrgyzstan	6	6	0	0	0	95	23	+72	18
7	Thailand	6	5	0	0	1	70	22	+48	15
8	United Arab Emirates	6	4	0	0	2	48	27	+21	12
9	Mongolia	6	3	0	0	3	35	37	−2	9
10	Malaysia	6	2	0	0	4	46	59	−13	6
11	Athletes from Kuwait	6	1	0	0	5	41	40	+1	3
12	Bahrain	6	0	0	0	6	11	138	−127	0

All times are local (UTC+6).

January 28; 13:30	Thailand	4 – 15 (2–8, 1–2, 1–5)	Kyrgyzstan	Kazakhstan Sports Palace 2, Astana; Attendance: 350

Game reference

Pongsak Phiewklam (out 13:17, in 19:51)
Jason Cotsmire (in 13:17, out 19:51)
Goalies
Sergey Ossintsev
Referee:
Choi Yoon-Young (KOR)

	0–1	06:05 – Fitisenko (Zhuravlyov)
	0–2	06:18 – Shiderinov (Falfudinov, Kolobov)
	0–3	07:15 – Shiderinov (Falfudinov, Kolobov)
	0–4	07:50 – Sazonov (V. Sorokin, Kudayarov)
	0–5	11:09 – Kolobov (SH)
	0–6	13:17 – Kolobov (Zhuravlyov, Falfudinov) (PP)
Thamwongsin (Rodprasert) (SH) – 15:06	1–6
	1–7	16:17 – Kryukov (PP)
Rattanachot (Ct. Supadilokluk) – 19:34	2–7
	2–8	19:51 – Sazonov (Zhuravlyov)
	2–9	24:52 – Kryukov
	2–10	35:55 – Shiderinov (Kryukov)
Neimwan (Ce. Supadilokluk, Rattanachot) – 37:56	3–10
	3–11	45:02 – Kolobov (Falfudinov, Fillippov)
	3–12	49:21 – Alexeyev (Kudayarov, Zhuravlyov)
	3–13	54:32 – Kryukov (Falfudinov, Shiderinov)
	3–14	57:38 – Falfudinov (Shiderinov, Kryukov)
	3–15	59:42 – Shiderinov (Kolobov, Fillippov)
Thamwongsin (Ct. Supadilokluk) – 59:59	4–15

6 min
Penalties
8 min
27
Shots
56

January 29; 17:00	Bahrain	0 – 29 (0–11, 0–10, 0–8)	Thailand	Kazakhstan Sports Palace 2, Astana; Attendance: 200

Game reference

Abdulla Al-Adhab
Goalies
Jason Cotsmire
Referee:
Keith Fong (CAN)

0–1	03:00 – Aarola (Thamwongsin)
0–2	03:52 – Neimwan (Chartsuwan)
0–3	05:20 – Jirachai (Tengsakul)
0–4	07:03 – Thongaram (Neimwan) (PP)
0–5	09:01 – Jirachai (Tengsakul)
0–6	09:45 – Pivekumt (Aarola) (PP2)
0–7	10:10 – Aarola (Pivekumt) (PP)
0–8	10:34 – Thammasit (Thongaram) (PP)
0–9	11:51 – Rattanachot (Ct. Supadilokluk, Chartsuwan) (PP)
0–10	12:20 – Rattanachot (Neimwan, Chartsuwan) (PP)
0–11	19:06 – Kullugin (Aarola, Pivekumt)
0–12	20:14 – Chartsuwan (Neimwan) (SH)
0–13	23:15 – Aarola (Pivekumt)
0–14	24:56 – Chartsuwan
0–15	27:26 – Thamwongsin (Pivekumt, Kullugin)
0–16	29:07 – Rattanachot (Chartsuwan) (PP)
0–17	30:18 – Tengsakul (Thammasit)
0–18	30:29 – Kasemsunt (Thammasit)
0–19	30:38 – Aarola (Thamwongsin)
0–20	31:12 – Aarola (Thamwongsin)
0–21	35:12 – Thamwongsin (Kullugin)
0–22	42:45 – Pivekumt (Harnnarujchai, Thamwongsin) (PP)
0–23	50:00 – Rattanachot (Ce. Supadilokluk)
0–24	50:14 – Chartsuwan (Rattanachot)
0–25	53:02 – Thamwongsin (Pivekumt, Aarola)
0–26	54:09 – Thammasit (Jittranont)
0–27	56:02 – Rattanachot (Neimwan)
0–28	58:11 – Aarola
0–29	59:21 – Chartsuwan (Ce. Supadilokluk, Neimwan)

39 min
Penalties
4 min
2
Shots
70

January 31; 20:30	Thailand	5 – 3 (2–0, 0–2, 3–1)	Athletes from Kuwait	Kazakhstan Sports Palace 2, Astana; Attendance: 100

Game reference

Pongsak Phiewklam (out 40:00)
Jason Cotsmire (in 40:00)
Goalies
Jasem Al-Sarraf
Referee:
Choi Yoon-Young (KOR)

Thamwongsin – 01:55	1–0
Tengsakul (Jittranont) – 10:23	2–0
	2–1	27:01 – Me. Al-Ajmi (A. Al-Ajmi) (SH)
	2–2	39:18 – Mo. Al-Ajmi (A. Al-Maragi)
Neimwan (Rattanachot) (PP) – 53:04	3–2
	3–3	57:42 – A. Al-Maragi (Shetail) (PP)
Neimwan (Chartsuwan) – 58:16	4–3
Neimwan (PS) – 59:19	5–3

35 min
Penalties
14 min
47
Shots
26

February 2; 20:30	Thailand	16 – 1 (7–0, 7–0, 2–1)	Malaysia	Kazakhstan Sports Palace 2, Astana; Attendance: 300

Game reference

Jason Cotsmire
Goalies
Tengku Mohd Azlly (out 36:10)
Abdul Hakim Ismail (in 36:10)
Referee:
Liu Wubin (CHN)

Ct. Supadilokluk (Chartsuwan) (PP) – 02:09	1–0
Chartsuwan (Neimwan) – 05:33	2–0
Rattanachot (Aarola) (PP) – 10:09	3–0
Chartsuwan (Aarola) (PP) – 11:29	4–0
Aarola – 13:24	5–0
Chartsuwan (Aarola) – 16:43	6–0
Aarola (Rattanachot) (SH) – 18:56	7–0
Thamwongsin (Tengsakul) – 27:47	8–0
Aarola (Rattanachot) – 30:20	9–0
Chartsuwan (Rattanachot) – 30:35	10–0
Chartsuwan (Aarola, Neimwan) – 34:53	11–0
Aarola (Chartsuwan, Rattanachot) – 35:47	12–0
Kullugin (Tengsakul) – 36:10	13–0
Harnnarujchai (Pivekumt) – 38:16	14–0
	14–1	48:50 – Yap E.J. (David)
Neimwan (Rodprasert) – 53:14	15–1
Jittranont – 56:25	16–1

8 min
Penalties
24 min
55
Shots
15

February 4; 17:00	Mongolia	1 – 7 (1–1, 0–4, 0–2)	Thailand	Kazakhstan Sports Palace 2, Astana; Attendance: 100

Game reference

Bazarvaani Baatarkhuu
Goalies
Pongsak Phiewklam
Referee:
Andrey Sachuk (KAZ)

	0–1	01:04 – Kasemsunt (Chartsuwan)
Bayarjargal (Bolor-Erdene) – 13:53	1–1
	1–2	27:12 – Neimwan (Chartsuwan)
	1–3	32:35 – Neimwan (Chartsuwan)
	1–4	35:01 – Chartsuwan (Aarola, Neimwan)
	1–5	35:59 – Aarola (Chartsuwan) (PP)
	1–6	41:15 – Thamwongsin (Kullugin, Tengsakul)
	1–7	43:20 – Ongvisagepaiboon (SH)

10 min
Penalties
12 min
19
Shots
42

February 5; 20:30	United Arab Emirates	2 – 9 (0–1, 2–5, 0–3)	Thailand	Kazakhstan Sports Palace 2, Astana; Attendance: 300

Game reference

Ahmed Al-Dhaheri (out 33:38)
Khaled Al-Suwaidi (in 33:38)
Goalies
Jason Cotsmire
Referee:
Andrey Sachuk (KAZ)

	0–1	13:27 – Chartsuwan (PS)
Al. Al-Mazrouei (J. Al-Dhaheri) – 24:01	1–1
	1–2	24:34 – Chartsuwan (Aarola)
Al-Darmaki (Al-Nuaimi, T. Al-Shamisi) – 25:11	2–2
	2–3	25:45 – Chartsuwan (Aarola)
	2–4	26:29 – Chartsuwan (Aarola)
	2–5	33:38 – Aarola (Ct. Supadilokluk)
	2–6	38:21 – Kasemsunt (Aarola) (PP)
	2–7	44:06 – Rattanachot (Aarola, Neimwan)
	2–8	48:38 – Tengsakul (Thamwongsin)
	2–9	57:41 – Rattanachot (Ongvisagepaiboon)

18 min
Penalties
12 min
18
Shots
31
