= Uzbekistan at the 2011 Asian Winter Games =

- IOC code: UZB
- NOC: National Olympic Committee of the Republic of Uzbekistan

in Astana and Almaty
- Competitors: 8 in 3 sports
- Medals: Gold 0 Silver 0 Bronze 0 Total 0

Asian Winter Games appearances
- 1996; 1999; 2003; 2007; 2011; 2017; 2025; 2029

Uzbekistan participated in the 2011 Asian Winter Games in Almaty and Astana, Kazakhstan from January 30, 2011 to February 6, 2011.

== Alpine skiing ==
Uzbekistan sent 4 alpine skiers.

Men

Athlete	Event	Final	
Athlete	Event	Time	Rank
Dmitriy Babikov	Downhill	Did not finish	
Dmitriy Babikov	Super-G	1:13.02	8
Dmitriy Babikov	Super Combined	1:58.80	8
Artem Voronov	Downhill	1:34.66	7
Artem Voronov	Super-G	1:11.02	5
Artem Voronov	Super Combined	1:54.97	6

Women

Athlete	Event	Final	
Athlete	Event	Time	Rank
Svetlana Baranova	Downhill	Did not finish	
Svetlana Baranova	Super-G	1:21.95	8
Svetlana Baranova	Super Combined	Did not finish	
Kseniya Grigoreva	Downhill	1:44.86	5
Kseniya Grigoreva	Super-G	1:16.44	6
Kseniya Grigoreva	Super Combined	2:09.90	6

== Biathlon ==
Uzbekistan sent 2 Biathletes.

Men

Athlete	Event	Final	
Athlete	Event	Time	Rank
Murod Hodjibayev	Individual	1:13:43.2	9
Murod Hodjibayev	Sprint	35:21.3	9
Murod Hodjibayev	Pursuit	Lapped	
Anuzar Yunusov	Individual	1:21:42.6	10
Anuzar Yunusov	Sprint	35:52.4	10
Anuzar Yunusov	Pursuit	Lapped	

== Figure skating ==
Men

Athlete(s)	Event	SP/SP		FS/LP		Total	
Athlete(s)	Event	Points	Rank	Points	Rank	Points	Rank
Misha Ge	Men's	53.97	9	123.39	5	177.36	6

Women

Athlete(s)	Event	SP/SP		FS/LP		Total	
Athlete(s)	Event	Points	Rank	Points	Rank	Points	Rank
Anastasia Gimazetdinova	Women's	40.59	8	WD	WD	WD	WD
