= Victor Lobo Escolar =

Spanish biathlete (born 1979)

Victor Lobo
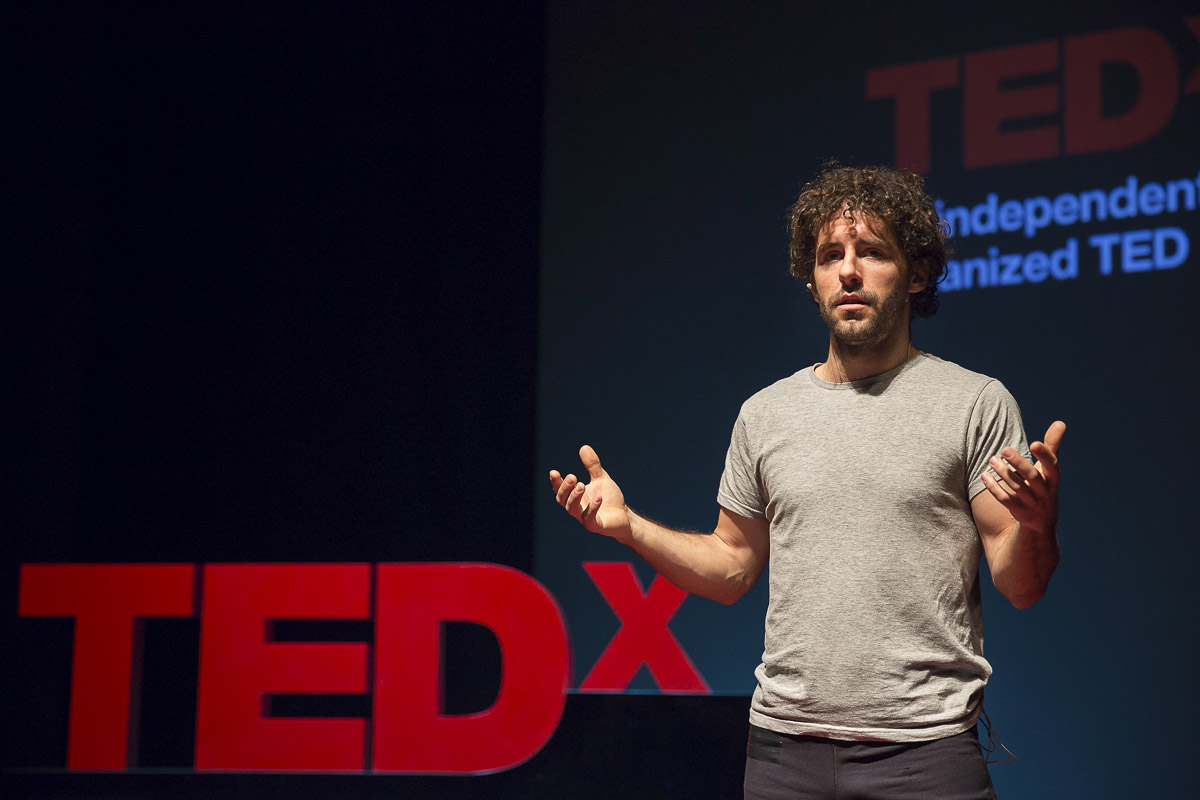
- Lobo speaking at TedX

Personal information
- Full name: Victor Lobo Escolar
- Born: 19 November 1979 Zaragoza, Spain
- Height: 5 ft 7 in (170 cm)

Sport
- Sport: Skiing

Victor Lobo Escolar (Note: In this Spanish name, the first or paternal surname is Lobo and the second or maternal family name is Escolar.) (born 19 November 1979) is a Spanish biathlete. He competed at the 2014 Winter Olympic Games in Sochi, in sprint and individual.

== Olympic results ==
Season	Date	Location	Discipline	Place
2014	8 February 2014	Sochi, Russia	Sprint	84th
2014	13 February 2014	Sochi, Russia	Individual	72nd
