= Miki Itō (skier) =

Japanese freestyle skier (born 1987)

Personal information
- Born: July 20, 1987 (age 38) Hino, Shiga, Japan
- Height: 5 ft 4 in (163 cm)
- Weight: 112 lb (51 kg)

Sport
- Country: Japan
- Sport: Freestyle skiing
Medal record
Women's freestyle skiing
Representing Japan
World Championships
Silver medal – second place	2009 Inawashiro	Dual Moguls
Silver medal – second place	2013 Voss	Moguls
Silver medal – second place	2013 Voss	Dual moguls
Asian Games
Silver medal – second place	2011 Astana-Almaty	Moguls
Bronze medal – third place	2011 Astana-Almaty	Dual moguls

Miki Itō (伊藤 みき, Itō Miki) (born in Hino, Shiga on July 20, 1987) is a Japanese freestyle skier active since 2004. She competed in the 2006 Winter Olympics and competed for Japan at the 2010 Winter Olympics in Ladies' Moguls.
