= Fredrik Lindström (biathlete) =

Swedish biathlete

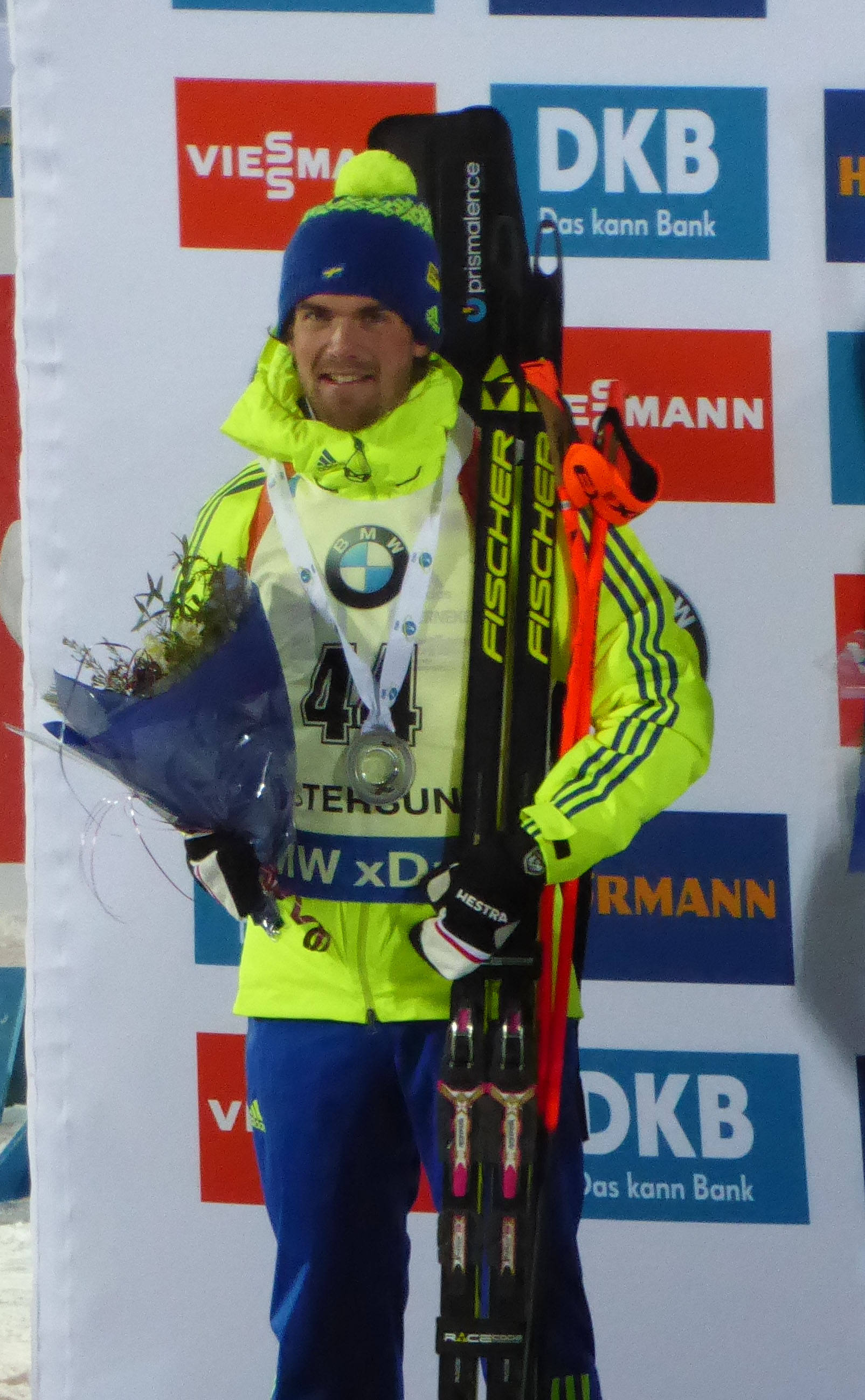
- Lindström during World Cup competitions in Östersund in December 2016

Personal information
- Born: 24 July 1989 (age 37) Örnsköldsvik, Sweden
- Height: 1.80 m (5 ft 11 in)

Sport
- Sport: Skiing

World Cup career
- Seasons: 2008/09–2018/19
- Indiv. podiums: 7
- Indiv. wins: 1
Medal record
Men's biathlon
Representing Sweden
International biathlon competitions
Event	1st	2nd	3rd
Olympic Games	1	0	1
World Championships	0	0	3
Total	1	0	4
Olympic Games
Bronze medal – third place	2010 Vancouver	4 × 7.5 km relay
Gold medal – first place	2018 Pyeongchang	4 × 7.5 km relay
World Championships
Bronze medal – third place	2011 Khanty-Mansiysk	4 × 7.5 km relay
Bronze medal – third place	2012 Rupholding	15 km mass start
Bronze medal – third place	2013 Nové Město	20 km individual
- Updated on 23 February 2018

Fredrik Lindström (born 24 July 1989) is a Swedish former biathlete from Bredbyn. He made his World Cup debut on 12 December 2008 in Hochfilzen, where he ended up in 47th place.

He represented Sweden at three Winter Olympics; 2010, 2014 and 2018. His best result is a victory in the men's relay in 2018. Lindström also won 2 medals individually in the World Championships: bronze in mass start in 2012 and bronze in the individual in 2013.

On 17 March 2019, he announced his retirement from biathlon following the 2018–2019 season.

== Biathlon results ==
All results are sourced from the International Biathlon Union.

=== Olympic Games ===
2 medals (1 gold)

Event	Individual	Sprint	Pursuit	Mass start	Relay	Mixed relay
(Canada) 2010 Vancouver	77th	38th	33rd	–	Bronze	—N/a
(Russia) 2014 Sochi	15th	18th	13th	6th	10th	–
(South Korea) 2018 Pyeongchang	8th	39th	29th	15th	Gold	11th

=== World Championships ===
3 medals (3 bronze)

Event	Individual	Sprint	Pursuit	Mass start	Relay	Mixed relay
(Russia) 2011 Khanty-Mansiysk	61st	11th	25th	11th	3rd	–
(Germany) 2012 Rupholding	10th	6th	10th	3rd	16th	4th
(Czech Republic) 2013 Nové Město	3rd	8th	7th	12th	11th	14th
(Finland) 2015 Kontiolahti	38th	20th	24th	12th	—	16th
(Norway) 2016 Oslo	29th	30th	34th	—	7th	12th
(Austria) 2017 Hochfilzen	38th	30th	17th	8th	11th	6th

=== Individual victories ===
Date	Event	Competition	Level
20 January 2012	(Italy) Antholz	10 km Sprint	Biathlon World Cup

*Results are from IBU races which include the Biathlon World Cup, Biathlon World Championships and the Winter Olympic Games.
