= Nikolay Braichenko =

Kazakh biathlete (born 1986)

Personal information
- Born: 15 October 1986 (age 39) Shchuchinsk, Kazakh SSR, Soviet Union

Sport
- Sport: Skiing
Medal record
Men's biathlon
Representing Kazakhstan
Asian Games
Gold medal – first place	2011 Astana-Almaty	4×7.5 km relay
- Updated on 28 February 2013

Nikolay Braichenko (born in Shchuchinsk on 15 October 1986) is a Kazakh biathlete.

Braichenko competed in the 2010 Winter Olympics for Kazakhstan. He finished 84th in the Biathlon sprint.

As of February 2013, his only result at the Biathlon World Championships is a 22nd-place finish, as part of the 2011 Kazakh men's relay team.

As of February 2013, his best Biathlon World Cup finish is 14th, as part of the Kazakh men's relay team at Antholz in 2010/11. His best individual finish is 45th, in the individual at Pokljuka in 2010/11.
