= Yuliya Rodionova =

Kazakhstani freestyle skier (born 1990)

Personal information
- Born: January 11, 1990 (age 36) Oskemen, Kazakh SSR

Sport
- Sport: Skiing
- Updated on July 24, 2013

Yuliya Rodionova (born January 11, 1990, in Oskemen) is a Kazakh freestyle skier, specializing in Moguls .

Rodionova competed at the 2006 and 2010 Winter Olympics for Kazakhstan. Her best finish came in 2010, when she placed 22nd in the qualifying round of the moguls, failing to advance. In 2006, she finished 28th in the preliminary round, and did not advance.

As of April 2013, her best showing at the World Championships is 8th, in the 2009 dual moguls event.

Rodionova made her World Cup debut in December 2004. As of April 2013, her best World Cup event finish is 8th place, in the dual moguls event at Meribel in 2010/11. Her best World Cup overall finish in moguls is 25th, in 2008/09 and 2009/10.
