= China at the 2011 Asian Winter Games =

- IOC code: CHN
- NOC: Chinese Olympic Committee external link (in Chinese and English)

in Astana and Almaty
- Competitors: 134 in 9 sports
- Officials: 87
- Medals Ranked 4th: Gold 11 Silver 10 Bronze 14 Total 35

Asian Winter Games appearances
- 1986; 1990; 1996; 1999; 2003; 2007; 2011; 2017; 2025; 2029

China participated in the 2011 Asian Winter Games in Almaty and Astana, Kazakhstan from January 30, 2011, to February 6, 2011.

== Medal summary ==
Sport	Gold	Silver	Bronze	Total
Short track speed skating	4	1	2	7
Speed skating	2	2	1	5
Figure skating	2	1	2	5
Freestyle skiing	2	1	2	5
Biathlon	1	3	3	7
Cross-country skiing	0	1	2	3
Ski orienteering	0	1	1	2
Ice hockey	0	0	1	1
Totals (8 entries)	11	10	14	35

== Biathlon ==
China will send 13 biathletes.

Men

- Chen Haibin
- Li Huanjie
- Li Zhiguang
- Li Zhonghai
- Ren Long
- Zhang Chengye

Women

- Dong Xue
- Liu Yuanyuan
- Song Chaoqing
- Tang Jialin
- Wang Chunli
- Wang Yue
- Xu Yue

== Cross country skiing ==
China will send 8 cross country skiers.

Men

- Li Jingdong
- Sun Qinghai
- Zhou Hu

Women

- Li Hongxue
- Li Xin
- Liu Hongxue
- Man Dandan
- Tang Jialin

== Figure skating ==
China will send a team of 13 figure skaters, the most of any country.

Men

Athlete(s)	Event	SP/SP		FS/LP		Total	
Athlete(s)	Event	Points	Rank	Points	Rank	Points	Rank
Song Nan	Men's	66.54		134.56		201.10	3rd place, bronze medalist(s)
Wu Jialiang	Men's	129.29		129.29		183.82	5

Women

Athlete(s)	Event	SP/SP		FS/LP		Total	
Athlete(s)	Event	Points	Rank	Points	Rank	Points	Rank
Geng Bingwa	Women's						
Li Zijun	Women's						
Zhang Kexin	Women's						

Pairs

Athlete(s)	Event	SP/SP		FS/FS		Total	
Athlete(s)	Event	Points	Rank	Points	Rank	Points	Rank
Han Cong & Sui Wenjing	Pairs						
Tong Jian & Pang Qing	Pairs						

Ice dance

Athlete(s)	Event	SP/OD		FS/FD		Total	
Athlete(s)	Event	Points	Rank	Points	Rank	Points	Rank
Zheng Xun & Huang Xintong	Ice dancing						
Wang Chen & Yu Xiaoyang	Ice dancing						

== Freestyle skiing ==
China will send a team of 10 freestyle skiers.

Men

- Guo Xiangru
- Jia Zongyang
- Liu Zhongqing
- Ning Suning
- Wang Yusen
- Zhao Yang

Women

- Li Nan
- Ning Qin
- Yang Yu
- Zhang Xin

== Ice hockey ==
China will send both a men's and women's team. The men's team will play in the top division.

Men

The roster consists of 24 athletes.

=== Top Division ===
Team	GP	W	OTW	OTL	L	GF	GA	DIF	PTS
Kazakhstan	0	0	0	0	0	0	0	0	0
Japan	0	0	0	0	0	0	0	0	0
South Korea	0	0	0	0	0	0	0	0	0
China	0	0	0	0	0	0	0	0	0
Chinese Taipei	0	0	0	0	0	0	0	0	0

All times are local (UTC+6).

January 31, 2011; 19:00	China	v	Japan	Kazakhstan Sports Palace (Arena 1)

February 1, 2011; 19:00	Kazakhstan	v	China	Kazakhstan Sports Palace (Arena 1)

February 4, 2011; 14:30	China	v	Chinese Taipei	Kazakhstan Sports Palace (Arena 1)

February 6, 2011; 10:00	South Korea	v	China	Kazakhstan Sports Palace (Arena 1)

February 6, 2011; 14:00	Kazakhstan	v	Japan	Kazakhstan Sports Palace (Arena 1)

Women

The roster consists of 17 athletes.

=== Group A ===
Team	GP	W	OTW	OTL	L	GF	GA	DIF	PTS
China	0	0	0	0	0	0	0	0	0
Kazakhstan	0	0	0	0	0	0	0	0	0
Japan	0	0	0	0	0	0	0	0	0
North Korea	0	0	0	0	0	0	0	0	0
South Korea	0	0	0	0	0	0	0	0	0

All times are local (UTC+6).

January 29, 2011; 14:30	China	v	North Korea	Baluan Sholak Palace of Culture and Sports

January 31, 2011; 14:30	China	v	South Korea	Baluan Sholak Palace of Culture and Sports

February 1, 2011; 19:00	Japan	v	China	Baluan Sholak Palace of Culture and Sports

February 3, 2011; 16:00	China	v	Kazakhstan	Baluan Sholak Palace of Culture and Sports

== Short track speed skating ==
China will send a team of 11 short track speed skaters.

Men

- Gong Qiuwen
- Han Jialiang
- Liang Wenhao
- Liu Xianwei
- Song Weilong
- Yang Yin

Women

- Fan Kexin
- Liu Qiuhong
- Zhang Hui
- Zhao Nannan
- Zhou Yang

== Ski jumping ==
China will send a team of 4 ski jumpers.

- Li Yang
- Sun Jianping
- Xing Chenhui
- Yang Guang

== Ski orienteering ==
China will send 2 athletes.

Men

- Dong Wenqiang

Women

- Liu Xiaoting

== Speed skating ==
China will send a team of 16 speed skaters.

Men

- Cheng Yue
- Gao Xuefeng
- Li Bailin
- Song Xingyu
- Sun Longjiang
- Wang Nan
- Zhang Yaolin
- Zhang Zhongqi

Women

- Chang Chao
- Fu Chunyan
- Ji Jia
- Qi Shuai
- Wang Beixing
- Wang Fei
- Wang Jianlu
- Yu Jing
