= Ning Qin =

Chinese freestyle skier

Personal information
- Born: January 7, 1992 (age 33); Jiangsu, China

Sport
- Country: China
- Sport: freestyle skiing

Ning Qin (born 7 January 1992) is a Chinese freestyle skier. She was born in Jiangsu. She competed at the 2014 Winter Olympics in Sochi, where she qualified for the moguls finals.
