= Dias Keneshev =

Kazakhstani biathlete (born 1985)

Medal record

Men's biathlon

Representing Kazakhstan

Asian Games
Gold medal – first place	2011 Astana-Almaty	4×7.5 km relay

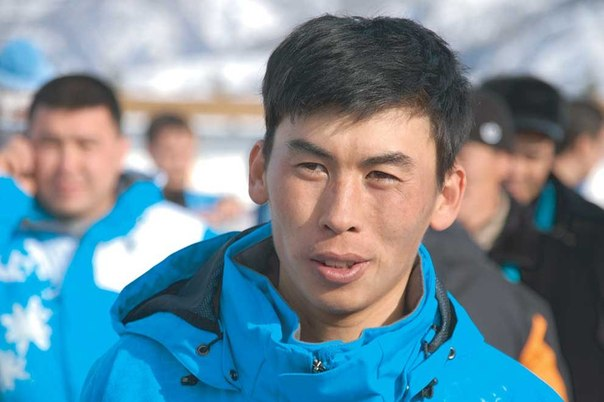
Dias Keneshev

Dias Keneshev (born 31 March 1985 in Urzhar) is a biathlete from Kazakhstan. He competed for Kazakhstan at the 2010 Winter Olympics. Keneshev was Kazakhstan's flag bearer during the 2010 Winter Olympics opening ceremony.

Olympic Games
Preceded by Bakhyt Akhmetov	Flagbearer for Kazakhstan; Vancouver 2010	Succeeded by Nurmakhan Tinaliyev
