= Li Nan (freestyle skier) =

Chinese freestyle skier

Personal information
- Nationality: Chinese
- Born: 3 March 1992 (age 33); Changchun, China

Sport
- Sport: Freestyle skiing

Li Nan (born 3 March 1992) is a Chinese freestyle skier. She competed in the 2022 Winter Olympics.

== Career ==
Li began skiing in 2000 but didn't begin mogul skiing until 2008. She placed 26th in moguls and 29th in dual moguls at the 2009 Ski World Championships. She finished 19th out of 30 competitors in the first qualifying round in the women's moguls event at the 2022 Winter Olympics before finishing 15th in the second qualifying round, failing to advance to the finals.
