= Ren Long =

Chinese biathlete (born 1988)

Medal record

Men's biathlon

Representing China

Asian Games
| Silver medal – second place | 2011 Astana-Almaty | 10 km sprint |
| Silver medal – second place | 2011 Astana-Almaty | 20 km individual |
| Bronze medal – third place | 2011 Astana-Almaty | 12.5 km pursuit |
| Bronze medal – third place | 2011 Astana-Almaty | 4×7.5 km relay |

Ren Long (Chinese: 任龙; born 21 December 1988) is a Chinese biathlete. He competed at the Biathlon World Championships 2011, 2012 and 2013. He competed at the 2014 Winter Olympics in Sochi, in the sprint and individual contests.
