= Alexandr Chervyakov =

Kazakhstani biathlete (born 1980)

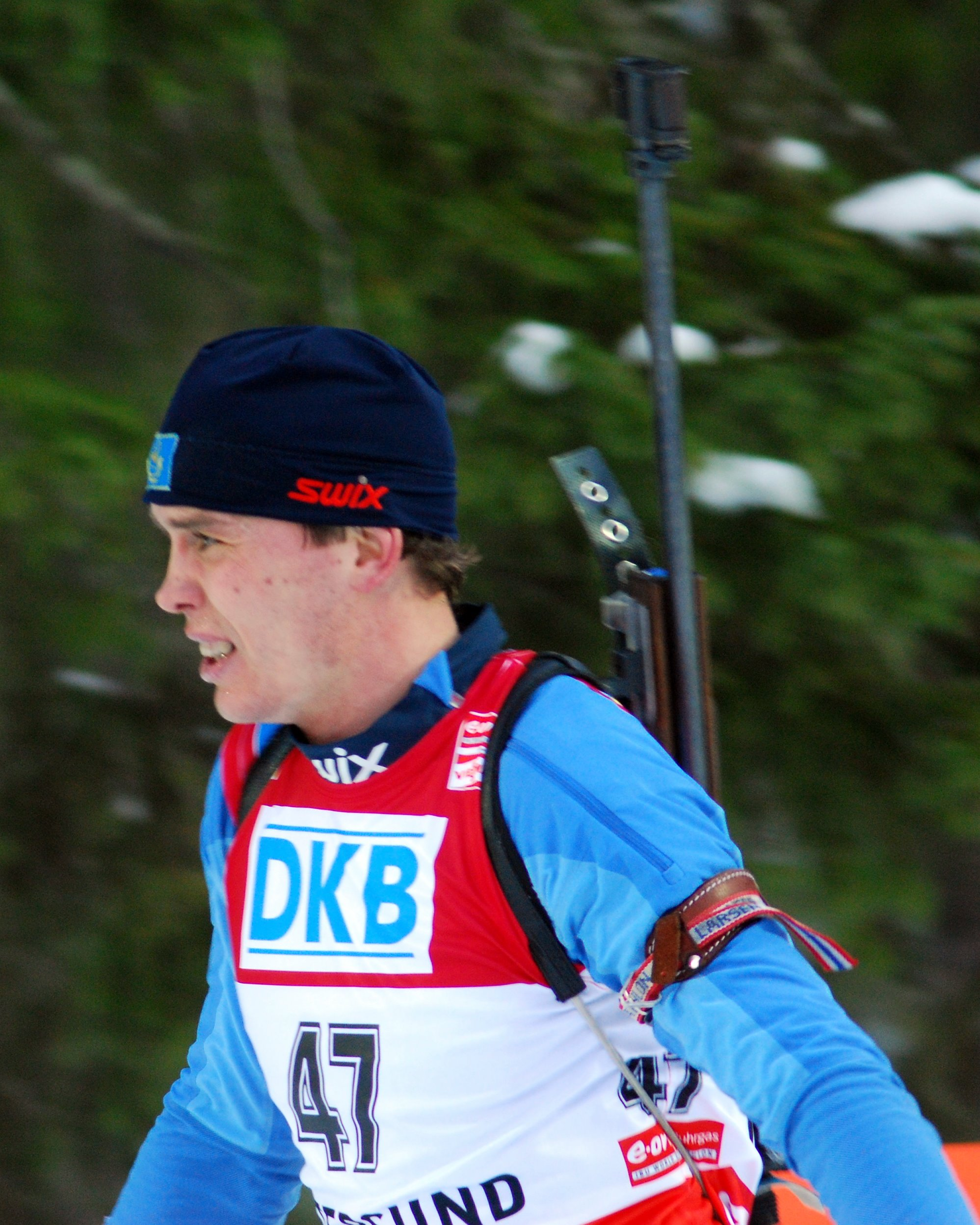

Personal information
- Born: 18 June 1980 (age 46) Kokshetau, Kazakh SSR, Soviet Union
- Height: 180 cm (5 ft 11 in)

Sport
- Sport: Skiing
- Updated on 28 February 2013

Alexandr Chervyakov (Kazakh: Александр Червяков; born 18 June 1980) is a Kazakhstani biathlete.

He competed in the 2006 and 2010 Winter Olympics for Kazakhstan. His best finish was 18th, as a member of the Kazakh relay team in 2010. His best individual performance was 49th, in the 2010 pursuit.

As of February 2013, his best performance at the Biathlon World Championships is 15th, in the 2009 mixed relay and the 2012 men's relay. His best individual performance in a World Championships is 28th, in the 2008 individual.

As of February 2013, his best finish in a Biathlon World Cup is 11th, again in a mixed relay, at Pyeongchang in 2007–08. His best individual finish is 27th, in an individual race at Turin in 2004–05. His best overall finish is from 2009–10, placing 61st.
